= Road Warrior Hawk =

American professional wrestler (1957–2003)

- Hawk in 1997

Personal information
- Born: Michael James Hegstrand; January 26, 1957 Saint Paul, Minnesota, U.S.
- Died: October 19, 2003 (aged 46) Indian Rocks Beach, Florida, U.S.
- Cause of death: Heart attack
- Spouses: Judy Pendzimas (m. 1986; div. 1991) Dale Watts (m. 1998)

Professional wrestling career
- Ring name(s): Crusher Von Haig; Hawk; Hawk Warrior; Road Warrior Hawk
- Billed height: 6 ft 3 in (191 cm)
- Billed weight: 275 lb (125 kg)
- Billed from: Chicago, Illinois
- Trained by: Eddie Sharkey
- Debut: 1983

Michael James "Mike" Hegstrand (January 26, 1957 – October 19, 2003) was an American professional wrestler. He was best known as Road Warrior Hawk, one half of the tag team known as the Road Warriors (or the "Legion of Doom"), with Road Warrior Animal. Outside of the Road Warriors, Hawk was a sporadic challenger for world heavyweight championships on pay-per-view from the late 1980s to the mid-1990s. He headlined the inaugural 1993 edition of Extreme Championship Wrestling's premier annual event, November to Remember.

As a member of the Road Warriors Hawk and Animal were voted the Wrestling Observer Newsletter Rookies of the Year in 1983, and were voted Pro Wrestling Illustrated Tag Team of the Year five times (1983, 1984, 1985, 1988). During their tenure the pair were two time WWF Tag Team Champions, one time AWA World Tag Team Championships and the NWA International Tag Team Championships. They also were two time NWA World Six-Man Tag Team Championship with Dusty Rhodes. He also was a two time IWGP Tag Team Champion with Power Warrior. Individually he was a one time CWA World Heavyweight Championship.

He was inducted into the Wrestling Observer Newsletter Hall of Fame in 1996. In 2011 he and Animal were inducted into both the WWE Hall of Fame and the Professional Wrestling Hall of Fame and Museum.

== Early life ==
Michael Hegstrand was born on January 26, 1957, to Marge and Art Hegstrand. He grew up in North, Minneapolis alongside his four brothers and sister. Hegstrand attended Patrick Henry High School where he graduated in 1976. After high school, he had various odd jobs to make ends meet such as a butcher. It was while working as a bouncer at Gramma B's in the Twin Cities that he caught the eye of Eddie Sharkey, a well-known wrestling trainer. Sharkey thought that Hegstrand, along with Joe Laurinaitis, Rick Rood and Barry Darsow could make it big in professional wrestling.

== Professional wrestling career ==
=== Early career (1983–1986) ===
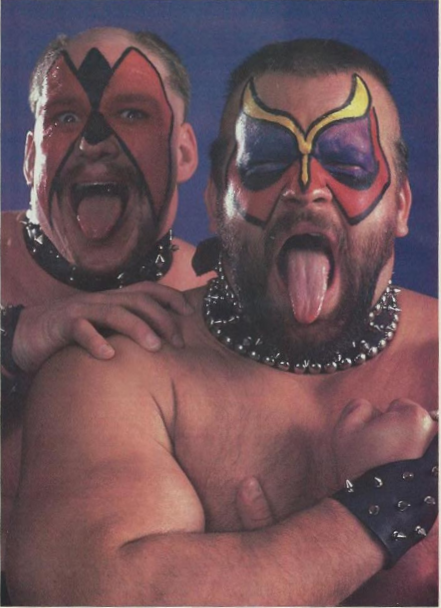
Hawk (left), with tag team partner Road Warrior Animal c. 1986

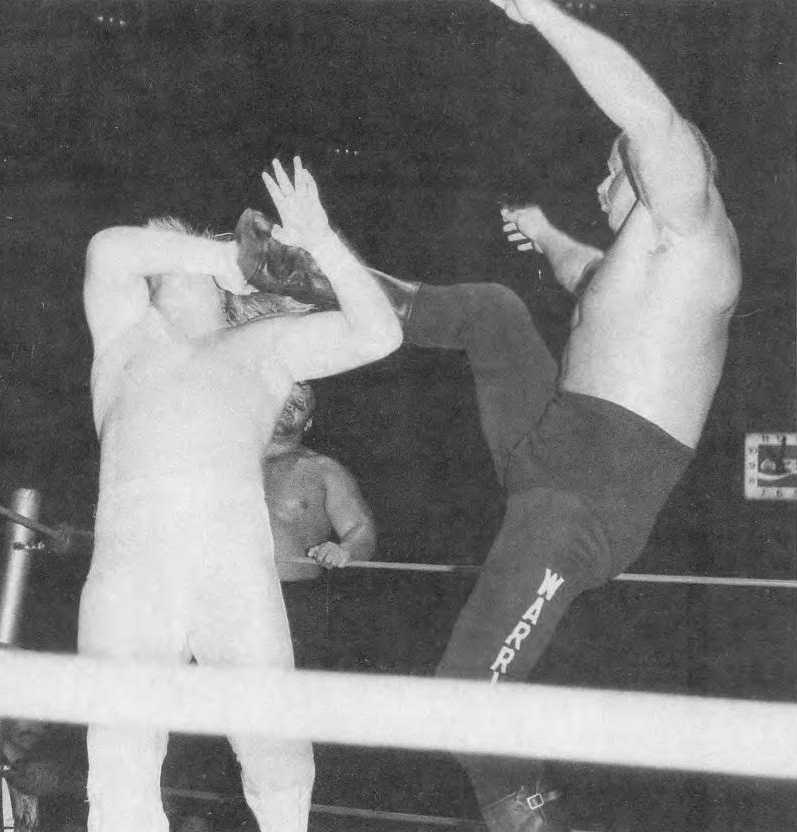
Hawk (right) kicking Bobby Eaton (left), circa 1987.

Hegstrand started his career as part of the Traveling All-Stars. He was billed as "Crusher Von Haig" and wrestled in Vancouver. Soon growing weary of the road and becoming homesick. Hegstrand traveled back home with Rood. Later in 1983, fate struck again when Laurinaitis's partner for the night found himself in legal trouble. Needing a quick replacement, Ole Anderson gave Hegstrand a call, and he accepted the booking to team with Laurinaitis. Neither man knew at the time that they would make wrestling history that day. When Paul Ellering was looking to put together a stable of heels in Georgia Championship Wrestling called The Legion of Doom it was decided to pair Laurinaitis with Hegstrand and change their names to "Animal" and "Hawk" respectively; thus, the Road Warriors were born. To look more intimidating the two shaved their heads into Mohawks and started wearing studded dog collars, leather chaps, and face paint. The look and name was taken from Mad Max 2: the Road Warrior, helping to paint the two as no-mercy monsters. Their interview style was vicious, yet charismatic and a bit humorous. Hawk was known for often beginning his promos with his trademark yell of "Wellllllllllllll!..." and ending with his catch phrase of "Oooooooooh, what a ruuuuuuuuuuuush!" The team was an instant hit, revolutionizing the tag-team scene with their power moves, no mercy attitudes, and innovative face paint that would spawn many future imitators in wrestling. In Georgia, they won the NWA National Tag Team Championship four times before moving on to bigger promotions such as the American Wrestling Association in the US and All Japan Pro Wrestling in Japan, winning tag-team titles wherever they went.

=== National Wrestling Alliance / World Championship Wrestling (1986–1990) ===
Their hard hitting style, no nonsense attitude, and winning ways made the Road Warriors fan favorites wherever they went; even when they were booked as heels, the fans refused to boo them. They were so in demand that they started to split their time between the AWA and the National Wrestling Alliance until finally leaving the AWA for big money contracts with the NWA and a huge push for the monster duo. The move paid off instantly as they won the inaugural Jim Crockett, Sr. Memorial Cup Tag Team Tournament and feuded with the top stars of the NWA such as The Four Horsemen and The Russian Team (which included the Road Warriors’ old training buddy Barry Darsow, then wrestling as Krusher Khrushchev). During their initial run in the Mid-Atlantic region of the NWA, they helped popularize the WarGames match, the Scaffold match, and their trademark Chicago Street Fight.

In 1988, the Road Warriors engaged in a violent feud with the Powers of Pain (The Barbarian and The Warlord), the first team that could truly match the Road Warriors in power (and who were one of the most well known Road Warrior clones). The Powers of Pain even went so far as to injure Animal's eye (kayfabe) during a weightlifting competition. When Animal returned, he initially wore a hockey goalie mask to protect his eye. The angle abruptly ended when the Powers of Pain left the NWA after finding out they were booked against the Road Warriors in a series of Scaffold Matches and they did not want to get hurt by falling off the scaffold. Near the end of 1988, the Road Warriors captured the NWA World Tag Team Championship from The Midnight Express whom they mauled in short order to win the titles in New Orleans. Despite being heels at the time and using brutal tactics against Stan Lane and "Beautiful" Bobby Eaton, once again they were cheered by the crowd. After being the "Uncrowned champions" for a long time, the Road Warriors’ run with the tag-team titles was short-lived. Crooked referee Teddy Long used a fast count to cheat the Road Warriors out of their titles. In their last year with the NWA, the Warriors feuded mainly with The Varsity Club, The Samoan Swat Team, and The Skyscrapers before leaving the NWA in the summer of 1990.

=== World Wrestling Federation (1990–1992) ===
The Road Warriors immediately signed with the World Wrestling Federation and were pushed into a feud with Demolition (which once again included their old training partner Barry Darsow). Due to his health, Ax was replaced by a new member of Demolition, Crush. (Popular rumor at the time cited a heart condition on Bill Eadie's part, but this has been discredited in recent years. An allergic reaction to shellfish while in Japan after WrestleMania VI was the real cause of Eadie's temporary health problem. He confirmed this in a shoot interview in 2007.) However, fans did not react as strongly to this new Demolition team as they had to the original configuration, and the feud was considered a disappointment. During the early part of the feud, Legion of Doom often teamed with WWF World Heavyweight Champion Ultimate Warrior in six-man tag matches against all three members of Demolition. Just over a year after signing with the WWF, the Legion of Doom won the WWF World Tag Team Titles from The Nasty Boys at SummerSlam 1991 and held them for about six months. When they lost the titles in February 1992 they were briefly taken off television, only to return with long-time manager Paul Ellering by their side, as well as a wooden dummy called "Rocco". Both members of the Legion of Doom thought the gimmick was stupid, as did most of the fans and it led to Hawk quitting the WWF, leaving Animal on his own for the first time in nine years. When Animal suffered a severe back injury a short while later, everyone thought it was the end of the legendary team.

=== Japan, ECW and Independents (1992–1995) ===
Hawk competed as a singles wrestler in Europe, Australia, and Japan and although he won nearly every singles match he competed in, he was usually seen (by North American and Japanese fans at least) as a tag team wrestler. Thus, he always fought either mid-card opponents or made teams with better-known singles stars. When he joined New Japan Pro-Wrestling, he was immediately paired with Kensuke Sasaki, then simply known as a good mid-carder, as the Hell Raisers (Sasaki adopting the face paint and gimmick Power Warrior). The two dominated NJPW's tag team ranks for a while through their two wins of the IWGP Tag Team Championship, but no North American promoter thought about bringing them as a team, due to Sasaki's affiliation with NJPW. As a singles wrestler, Hawk found success in Europe, winning the CWA World Heavyweight Championship. Hawk also competed in NWA Eastern Championship Wrestling, the progenitor of Extreme Championship Wrestling, in 1993. Hawk left ECW in 1994. Hawk competed in the independent circuit for Pro Wrestling America, Mid Eastern Wrestling Federation, Smokey Mountain Wrestling and Midwest Territorial Wrestling.

=== World Championship Wrestling (1993, 1995–1996) ===
In August 1993 Hawk made sporadic appearances in World Championship Wrestling as a mystery partner of Dustin Rhodes and later as a replacement partner when Davey Boy Smith left the promotion and wrestling Rude for the WCW International Championship at Clash of the Champions XXV, and later appeared as a replacement partner for Sting at Starrcade 1993 when Davey Boy Smith left the promotion but nothing permanent ever came of it, and Hawk left after Starrcade in December 1993. In May 1995, he reappeared in WCW. In July 1995, he helped Sting in a feud against Meng and Kurasawa, but a proposed singles feud with Kurasawa fell through due to an arm injury (in kayfabe Kurasawa broke Hawk's arm using a cross armbreaker, to let Hawk rest). Hawk returned in January 1996, but this time, he also brought Animal back with him as his back had finally recovered enough for him to return to active competition. During that time, Sting and Lex Luger had won the WCW World Tag Team Championship and the Warriors challenged them, to no success. The rise of the New World Order precluded further challenges, and they headed back to the WWF.

=== Return to WWF (1997–1999) ===
After leaving WCW they returned to the WWF where the Legion of Doom took part in the feud between "Stone Cold" Steve Austin and the Hart Foundation, siding with Austin. The Legion of Doom also became two-time tag-team champions on October 7, 1997, when they defeated The Godwinns. In November 1997 the Legion of Doom faced the newly formed New Age Outlaws (Road Dogg and Billy Gunn) and shockingly lost the titles to the upstart team. On an episode of Monday Night Raw, L.O.D. challenged D-Generation X (DX) in a Tag Match. During the match, The New Age Outlaws attacked L.O.D. and shaved off one of Hawk's mohawks, and threw Animal through the announcers table. After several unsuccessful challenges the L.O.D. were repackaged as "Legion of Doom 2000" with manager Sunny, although she did not stay with the team for long.

During the Attitude Era, in which the WWF moved towards a more "adult" product, the Legion of Doom was placed into a storyline incorporating Hegstrand's real-life drug addiction and alcoholism, against the wishes of both Hegstrand and Laurinaitis. The storyline found the Legion of Doom crumbling as Hawk repeatedly showed up to matches apparently drunk or under the influence of drugs, and began demonstrating suicidal tendencies. In order to stabilize the team, a third member, Puke, was introduced later known as Droz. This led to the conclusion of the storyline, in which a suicidal Hawk climbed to the top of the TitanTron, the giant television monitor erected during episodes of WWF's Raw Is War to show match highlights to fans in attendance. Puke, supposedly attempting to rescue Hawk, climbed after him, only to apparently throw Hawk over the side (with a special effect being used to make it appear as though fans could see Hegstrand's body plunging a fatal distance behind the screen); Puke then revealed that he had been enabling Hawk's drug addiction in order to kill him and take his place in the Legion of Doom. Being forced to act out Hegstrand's personal demons onscreen eventually proved too much for both Hegstrand and Laurinaitis, and both men quit the company shortly after the "Puke killed Hawk" incident.

=== Late career (1999–2003) ===
While the Road Warriors never officially broke up, Animal started making an increasing number of solo appearances after they left the WWF as Hegstrand struggled with drug and alcohol addiction and generally did not appear at many wrestling shows during this time. In 2000, during a tour in Australia, Hegstrand was diagnosed with cardiomyopathy, a heart condition that stopped him from wrestling for a short while. He was able to overcome its effects and returned to a regular working schedule later on. Laurinaitis and Hegstrand became born-again Christians in 2001 and appeared at a number of Christian wrestling events run by Ted DiBiase and Nikita Koloff hoping to reignite their tag-team career. On June 22, 2002, International Wrestling Superstars, Road Warriors Animal & Hawk defeated the Headshrinkers for the World Tag-Team Championship. That victory also led to Team USA winning the International Tournament held in Atlantic City, New Jersey.

They also appeared in Total Nonstop Action Wrestling (TNA) in late 2002 and early 2003 as part of a group that opposed Vince Russo’s faction Sports Entertainment Xtreme but only wrestled one actual match for the company. Animal and Hawk made a surprise appearance on Raw on May 12, 2003, when they took on Kane and Rob Van Dam for the World Tag Team Championship. Although Hawk and Animal came up short in their attempt to become three-time champions, it was clear that Hawk had defeated the demons that had once kept him from competing, and the Road Warriors had hopes of returning to WWE. Later in 2003, Hawk made an appearance with the All World Wrestling League, a take-off of the 'original' Big Time Wrestling that was owned by The Original Sheik who died earlier that year; it was run by the sons of The Sheik, Eddie and Tom Farhat. They decided to book Hawk for an event in Holt, Michigan; that event was the second to last time Hawk wrestled. Two weeks before he died, he wrestled his final match with Animal in Oshawa, Ontario, defeating Greg "The Hammer" Valentine and Buff Bagwell.

== Video game appearances ==
WCW video games
Year	Title	Notes
1990	WCW Wrestling	Video game debut Cover athlete

WWE video games
Year	Title	Notes
1991	WWF WrestleFest	Cover athlete
1992	WWF European Rampage Tour	
1992	WWF Super WrestleMania	Cover athlete
2003	WWE SmackDown! Here Comes the Pain	
2004	WWE SmackDown! vs. Raw	
2009	WWE Legends of WrestleMania	
2011	WWE All Stars	
2011	WWE '12	
2012	WWE '13	

Other wrestling video games
Year	Title	Notes
2001	Legends of Wrestling	Cover athlete
2002	Legends of Wrestling II	
2004	Showdown: Legends of Wrestling	

== Personal life ==
Hegstrand married his first wife Judy in 1986, the couple later divorced in 1991. He then married his second wife Dale in 2002 and the two settled in the Tampa Bay area.

Hegstrand and his tag team partner Lauriniatis owned two gyms in Minneapolis in the late 1980s. The pair, alongside gym employees Bob Truax and Dan Stock, conceptualized the Zubaz workout pants and helped popularize the brand globally. Hegstrand owned 25% of the company until its closure in 1996.

=== Death and legacy ===
Hegstrand died on October 19, 2003, in the early morning in his home in Indian Rocks Beach, Florida. He was 46 years old. His friends said that he and his wife Dale had recently bought a condominium near their current home and were packing their boxes the night before. Hegstrand said that he felt tired and went to take a nap. When his wife checked on him at about 1:00AM, he had died of a sudden heart attack. At the time of his death, Hawk and Animal were working on a book about their careers; Animal released the book (alongside co-writer Andrew Wright) as "The Road Warriors: Danger, Death and the Rush of Wrestling" (ISBN 978-1605425788) in 2014. Animal returned to WWE in mid-2005 and decided to dedicate his entire run to Hegstrand, including his tag team title victory with Heidenreich at The Great American Bash.

In 2003 the Road Warriors were ranked number 1 of the 100 best tag teams of the "PWI Years". In 2010 Bleacher Report dubbed The Road Warriors the greatest tag team of all time. Stating "There is only one team that I can think of that truly changed the face of pro wrestling, and that team is the Road Warriors."

On the March 28, 2011 episode of Raw, it was announced that the Road Warriors would be inducted into the WWE Hall of Fame Class of 2011. On April 2, 2011, the night before WrestleMania XXVII they, along with Paul Ellering, were inducted into the WWE Hall of Fame by Dusty Rhodes.

== Championships and accomplishments ==
- All Japan Pro Wrestling
  - NWA International Tag Team Championship (1 time) – with Road Warrior Animal
- Cauliflower Alley Club
  - Tag Team Award (2020)
- International Wrestling Superstars
  - IWS World Tag Team Championship (1 time) – with Road Warrior Animal
- American Wrestling Association
  - AWA World Tag Team Championship (1 time) – with Road Warrior Animal
- Catch Wrestling Association
  - CWA World Heavyweight Championship (1 time)
- Fighting World of Japan Pro Wrestling
  - World Japan Tag Team Championship (1 time) – with Road Warrior Animal
- Georgia Championship Wrestling
  - NWA National Tag Team Championship (4 times) – with Road Warrior Animal
- i-Generation Superstars of Wrestling
  - i-Generation Tag Team Championship (2 times) – with Road Warrior Animal
- Independent Pro Wrestling
  - IPW Tag Team Championship (1 time) – with Road Warrior Animal
- Jim Crockett Promotions / World Championship Wrestling
  - NWA World Six-Man Tag Team Championship (3 times) – with Road Warrior Animal and Dusty Rhodes (2) and Road Warrior Animal and Genichiro Tenryu (1)^{[a]}
  - NWA World Tag Team Championship (Mid-Atlantic version) (1 time) – with Road Warrior Animal^{[b]}
  - Iron Team Tournament (1989) – with Road Warrior Animal
  - Jim Crockett, Sr. Memorial Cup (1986) – with Road Warrior Animal
- Memphis Wrestling Hall of Fame
  - Class of 2022 – with Road Warrior Animal
- Mid-Atlantic Wrestling Alliance
  - MAWA Tag Team Championship (2 times) – with Doug Gibson and Tim Horner
- Mid-Eastern Wrestling Federation
  - MEWF Tag Team Championship (1 time) – with Ultimate Comet
- Midwest Territorial Wrestling
  - MTW Tag Team Championship (1 time) – with Bobo Brazil, Jr.
- National Wrestling Alliance
  - NWA Hall of Fame (Class of 2012)
  - NWA Legends Hall of Heroes (2016)
- New Japan Pro-Wrestling
  - IWGP Tag Team Championship (2 times) – with Power Warrior
- Professional Championship Wrestling (Texas)
  - PWC Tag Team Championship (1 time) – with Road Warrior Animal
- Professional Wrestling Hall of Fame and Museum
  - (Class of 2011) (As a member of the Road Warriors)
- Pro Wrestling Illustrated
  - Tag Team of the Year (1983, 1984, 1985, 1988) with Road Warrior Animal
  - Feud of the Year (1987) with Road Warrior Animal and The Super Powers (Dusty Rhodes and Nikita Koloff) vs. The Four Horsemen (Ric Flair, Arn Anderson, Tully Blanchard, and Lex Luger)
  - Ranked No. 25 of the top 500 singles wrestlers in the PWI 500 in 1995
  - Ranked No. 1 of the 100 best tag teams of the "PWI Years" with Road Warrior Animal as the Road Warriors in 2003
  - Ranked No. 47 of the top 500 singles wrestlers of the "PWI Years" in 2003
- Quebec Wrestling Hall of Fame
  - Class of 2015
- Super World of Sports
  - One Night Tag Team Tournament (1990) – with Road Warrior Animal
- Tokyo Sports
  - Best Foreigner Award (1985) with Road Warrior Animal
- World Wrestling Federation / WWE
  - WWF Tag Team Championship (2 times) – with Road Warrior Animal
  - WWE Hall of Fame (Class of 2011) as a member of the Road Warriors
- Wrestling Observer Newsletter
  - Rookies of the Year award (1983) with Road Warrior Animal
  - Tag Team of the Year (1984) with Road Warrior Animal
  - Wrestling Observer Newsletter Hall of Fame (Class of 1996)

^{a} The Road Warriors reign with the NWA World Six-Man Tag Team Championship, with Genichiro Tenryu, began December 7, 1988, after Ted Turner's purchase of Mid-Atlantic Championship Wrestling from Jim Crockett, Jr. and having it renamed World Championship Wrestling.

^{b} Hawk and Animal's reign with this championship also happened after Ted Turner bought and renamed the promotion. However, it took place before the title was renamed the WCW World Tag Team Championship.

== See also ==
- List of premature professional wrestling deaths
