= Road Warrior Animal =

American professional wrestler (1960–2020)

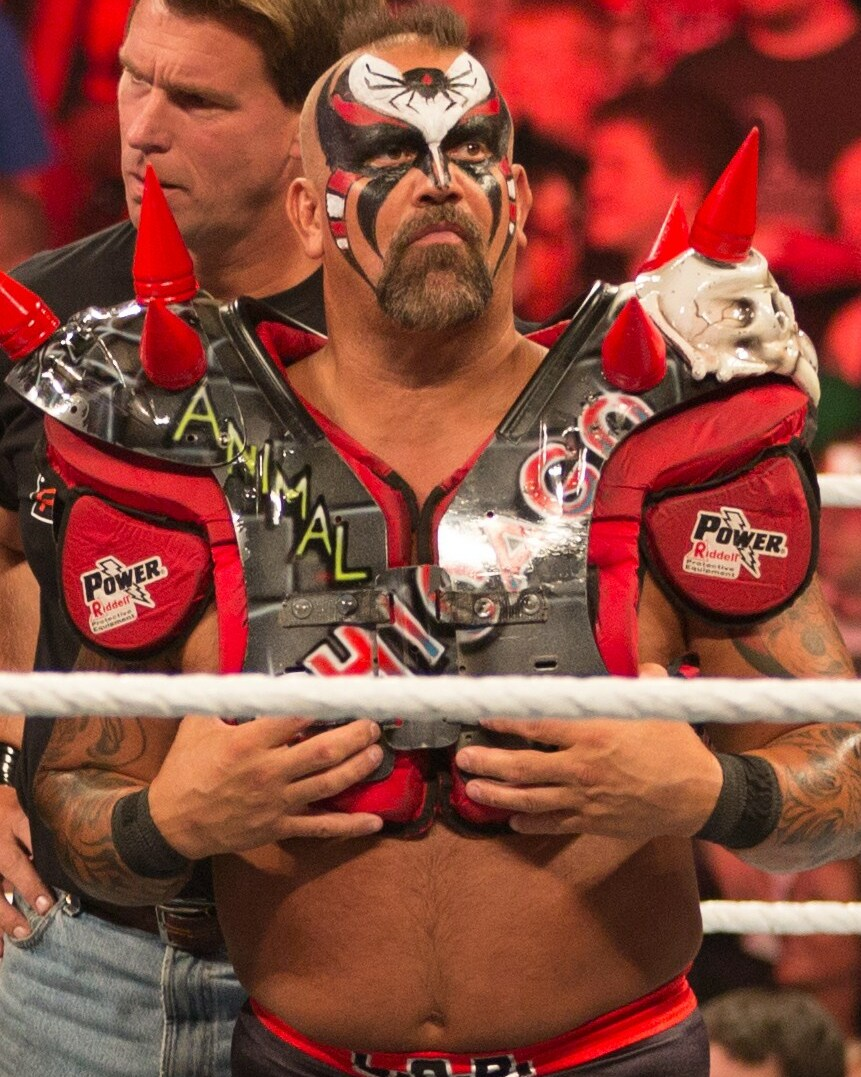
- Animal at Raw 1000 in 2012

Personal information
- Born: Joseph Michael Laurinaitis; September 12, 1960 Philadelphia, Pennsylvania, U.S.
- Died: September 22, 2020 (aged 60) Osage Beach, Missouri, U.S.
- Spouses: Julie Laurinaitis (divorced); Kim Laurinaitis
- Children: 3; including James Laurinaitis
- Family: John Laurinaitis (brother); The Terminator (brother)

Professional wrestling career
- Ring name(s): Animal; Animal Warrior; Road Warrior Animal; The Road Warrior
- Billed height: 6 ft 1 in (185 cm)
- Billed weight: 285 lb (129 kg)
- Billed from: Chicago, Illinois
- Trained by: Eddie Sharkey
- Debut: November 1982
- Retired: July 23, 2012

Joseph Michael Laurinaitis (September 12, 1960 – September 22, 2020), better known by his ring name Road Warrior Animal (or simply Animal), was an American professional wrestler. Along with Road Warrior Hawk, he was one-half of the tag team the Road Warriors (also known as the Legion of Doom).

Over the course of his career, Animal appeared with professional wrestling promotions including Georgia Championship Wrestling, Jim Crockett Promotions / World Championship Wrestling, the American Wrestling Association (AWA), All Japan Pro Wrestling, and the World Wrestling Federation (WWF) / World Wrestling Entertainment (WWE). He held multiple championships, including the AWA World Tag Team Championship, NWA National Tag Team Championship, NWA World Six-Man Tag Team Championship, NWA World Tag Team Championship, WWE Tag Team Championship, and WWF Tag Team Championship, and headlined multiple pay-per-view events, including competing for the WCW World Heavyweight Championship at WCW Sin.

Animal was inducted into the Wrestling Observer Newsletter Hall of Fame in 1996, the Professional Wrestling Hall of Fame and Museum in 2011, the WWE Hall of Fame in 2011, and the NWA Hall of Fame in 2012. The Road Warriors were named Tag Team of the Year by the Wrestling Observer Newsletter in 1984, and the number one tag team of the "PWI years" by Pro Wrestling Illustrated in 2003.

== Early life ==
Laurinaitis was born in Philadelphia on September 12, 1960, to his parents Joseph Anthony and Lorna Ann. He is of Lithuanian ancestry. Laurinaitis grew up in Minnesota, having to work for a living from a very early age; he also participated in a wide variety of sports such football, baseball and hockey. He attended Irondale High School. Because of his size and love of power lifting, Laurinaitis was an imposing figure and thus a very effective bouncer. He worked as a bouncer at Gramma B's in the Twin Cities where he caught the eye of Eddie Sharkey, a well-known wrestling trainer. Sharkey thought that Laurinaitis and Mike Hegstrand, Richard Rood, and Barry Darsow could make it big in professional wrestling, and trained all four of them.

== Professional wrestling career ==
=== Early career (1982–1983) ===
Laurinaitis made his debut in November 1982, competing as The Road Warrior using a biker gimmick. After only a few matches as a singles competitor, his career and life would change thanks to an idea by Paul Ellering.

=== Georgia Championship Wrestling (1983–1984) ===
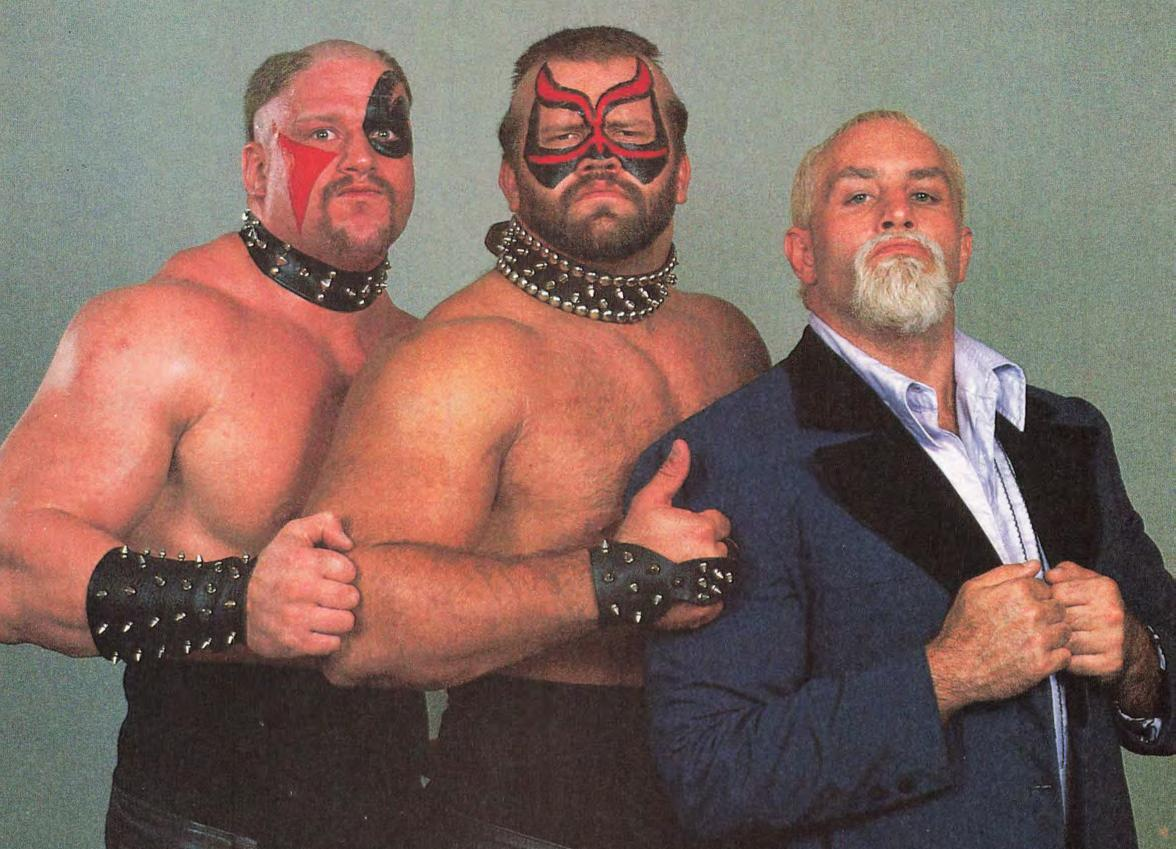
Animal (center) with tag team partner Road Warrior Hawk (left) and manager Paul Ellering (right), c. 1985

When Paul Ellering was looking to put together a stable of heels in Georgia Championship Wrestling (GCW) called the "Legion of Doom", it was decided to put Laurinaitis together with his good friend Mike Hegstrand and change their names to "Animal" and "Hawk" respectively. Thus, the Road Warriors were born. They first started out as biker gimmicks; on The Road Warriors DVD, Animal said he felt like one of the Village People. To look more intimidating, the two shaved their heads into Mohawks and started wearing studded dog collars, spiked shoulder pads, and face paint. The look and name were taken from The Road Warrior, helping to paint the two as no-mercy monsters. Their interview style was vicious, yet charismatic and a bit humorous. They wrestled their first match together in June 1983.

The team was an instant hit, revolutionizing the tag-team scene with their power moves, no mercy attitudes, and innovative face paint that would spawn many future imitators in wrestling. In Georgia, they won the NWA National Tag Team Championship four times.

=== Jim Crockett Promotions / World Championship Wrestling (1983–1990) ===
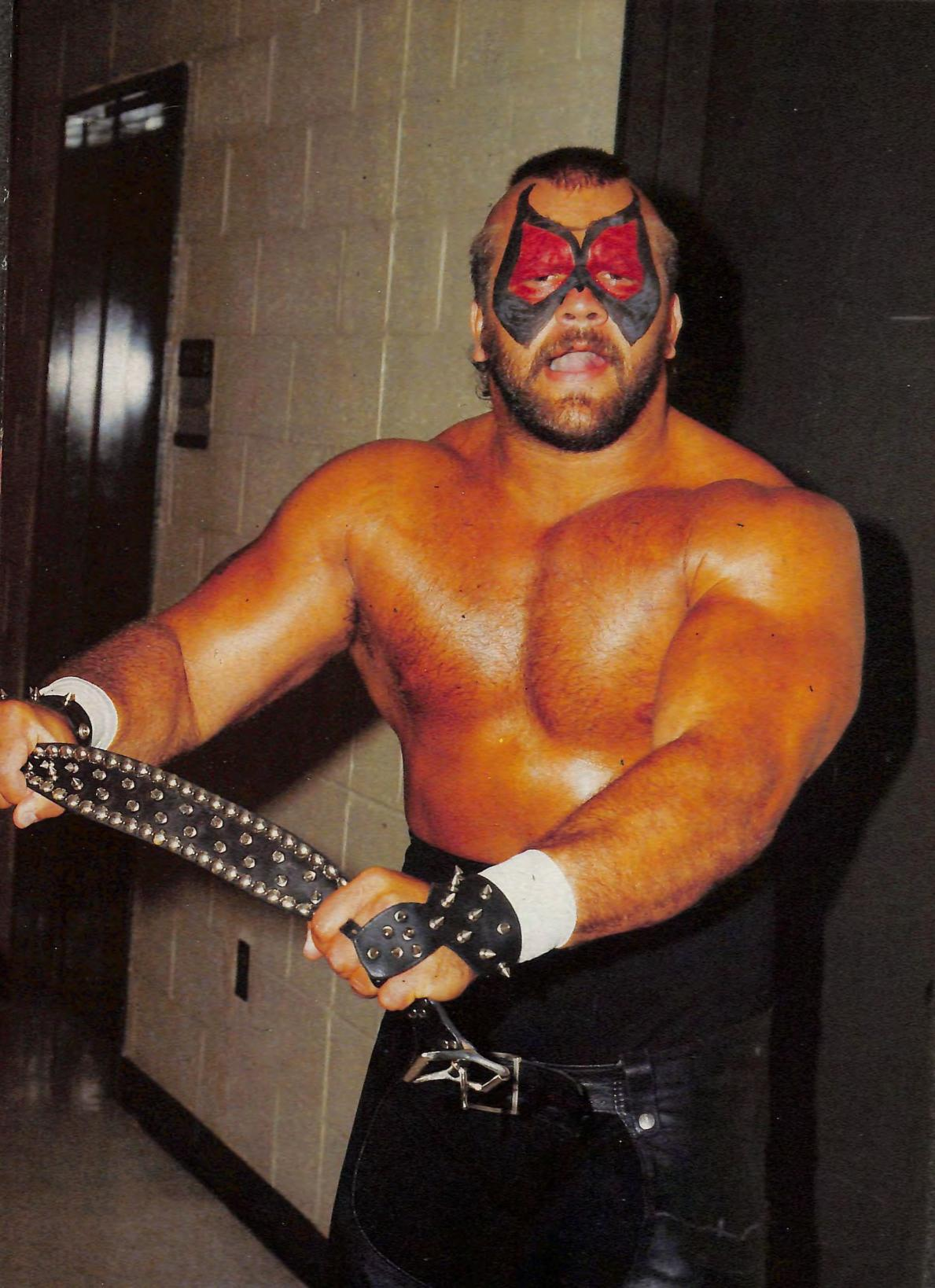
Animal in 1987

Their hard hitting style, no nonsense attitude, and winning ways made the Road Warriors fan favorites. Even when they were booked as heels, the fans refused to boo them. They started to split their time between the AWA and the National Wrestling Alliance (NWA) until finally leaving the AWA for big money contracts with the NWA and a huge push for the monster duo. The move paid off instantly as they won the inaugural Jim Crockett Sr. Memorial Cup Tag Team Tournament and feuded with the top stars of the NWA such as The Four Horsemen and The Russian Team (which included the Road Warriors' old training buddy Barry Darsow). During their initial run in the NWA, they helped popularize the WarGames match, the Scaffold match, and their trademark Chicago Street Fight.

In 1988, the Road Warriors engaged in a violent feud with The Powers of Pain (The Barbarian and The Warlord) the first team that could truly match the Road Warriors in power (and who were one of the most well known Road Warrior clones). The Powers of Pain even went so far as to injure Animal's eye, (kayfabe) as his eye injury actually occurred days earlier during a match, during a weightlifting competition. When Animal returned, he initially wore a hockey goalie mask to protect his eye. The angle abruptly ended when the Powers of Pain left the NWA after finding out they were booked against the Road Warriors in a series of Scaffold Matches and they did not want to get hurt by falling off the scaffold.

Near the end of 1988, the Road Warriors captured the NWA World Tag Team Championship from The Midnight Express whom they mauled in short order to win the titles. After being the "Uncrowned champions" for a long time the Road Warriors' run with the tag team titles was short-lived. Teddy Long used a fast count to cheat the Road Warriors out of their titles. In their last year with the NWA, the Warriors feuded mainly with The Varsity Club, The Samoan Swat Team, and The Skyscrapers before leaving the NWA in the summer of 1990, due to conflicts with Jim Herd.

=== American Wrestling Association (1984–1985) ===
From 1984 to 1985, Animal wrestled for the American Wrestling Association.

=== All Japan Pro Wrestling (1985–1989) ===
From 1985 to 1989, Animal wrestled for All Japan Pro Wrestling.

=== World Wrestling Federation (1990–1992) ===
The Road Warriors signed with the World Wrestling Federation (WWF) in 1990 and were pushed into a feud with the most famous of all "Road Warrior Clones", Demolition, a group which included their old training partner Barry Darsow. Due to the ailing health of one of Demolition (Ax) he was replaced by Crush, but the magic of the original Demolition was gone and the feud did not live up to the high hopes of the fans.

Just over a year after signing with the WWF, the Legion of Doom won the WWF Tag Team Championship and held it for over five months. When they lost the titles, they briefly left the WWF, only to return with longtime manager Paul Ellering by their side, as well as a wooden ventriloquist dummy called "Rocco". Both members of the L.O.D. thought the Rocco gimmick was stupid, and it led to Hegstrand walking out of the WWF immediately following SummerSlam 1992, leaving Laurinaitis on his own for the first time in nine years. Animal went ahead and finished his contractual obligations with the WWF, as a singles wrestler and occasionally teaming with former rival Crush, formerly of Demolition. During a handicap match in Japan against the Beverly Brothers in September 1992, Laurinaitis legitimately injured his back from a botched double suplex and had to take a lengthy hiatus. His last match was a victory over Papa Shango in San Francisco, California on October 16. After this his back was too injured to allow him to wrestle.

=== World Championship Wrestling (1993, 1996) ===
Laurinaitis made some non-wrestling appearances in WCW in 1993. On August 18, at the Clash of the Champions XXIV, Animal made his appearance, getting out of a black Camaro Z28 indicating his partner Hawk was Dustin Rhodes' mystery partner against Rick Rude and The Equalizer. On September 19, at Fall Brawl, Animal was the advisor for Sting's team, consisting of Sting, Davey Boy Smith, Dustin Rhodes, and The Shockmaster for WarGames, defeating Big Van Vader, Sid Vicious, and Harlem Heat.

For the next couple of years, Laurinaitis stayed out of the wrestling ring, collecting on an insurance policy from Lloyd's of London while Hegstrand competed all over the world. Near the end of 1995, Laurinaitis' back had finally recovered enough for him to return to active competition. Three years after everyone thought the Road Warriors had ended, they reunited and signed a contract with World Championship Wrestling. On January 4, 1996, Animal seconded Hawk in his match against Scott Norton in New Japan Pro-Wrestling's annual Tokyo Dome show. Upon their return in January 1996, they immediately started a feud with the Steiner Brothers, who returned in March, and Harlem Heat, before moving on to challenge the WCW Tag Team Champions Sting and Lex Luger. The Road Warriors had several shots at the champions but never won the title in the six months they were with the company. The Steiner Brothers also arrived shortly after the Warriors did, and feuded with them to try to prove who the best team of all time was. The Steiners got the better of the feud and the Warriors left WCW in June 1996.

=== Return to WWF (1997–1999) ===
After leaving WCW, they returned to the WWF where the Legion of Doom took part in the Stone Cold Steve Austin vs. the Hart Foundation feud, siding with Austin against the Harts. The Legion of Doom also became two-time tag team champions on October 7, 1997, when they defeated The Godwinns. In November 1997, the Legion of Doom faced the newly formed New Age Outlaws (Road Dogg and Billy Gunn) and lost the titles to the upstart team.

After several unsuccessful challenges, the L.O.D. were repackaged as "Legion of Doom 2000" with manager Sunny, although she did not stay with the team for long. At the same time, Paul Ellering returned, but sided with D.O.A., whom L.O.D. were feuding with at the time; Ellering and Animal explained on the Road Warriors DVD that it was hard for Ellering to work with another team against the Road Warriors and difficult to rip on his former team on promos.

In 1998, the Legion of Doom became involved in their most controversial angle; playing off Hegstrand's real life drug and alcohol problems. Hawk started to show up drunk or "unable to perform" on TV. As Hawk proved more and more erratic and unreliable, a third L.O.D. member, Puke, was introduced to team with Animal while Hawk dealt with his personal issues. The storyline ended with accusations that Puke had been the "enabler" of Hawk's problems, exploiting them to take Hawk's place in the team. During the controversial segment, Hawk was shown to have fallen off the Titan Tron. Neither Hegstrand nor Laurinaitis approved of the WWF exploiting Hegstrand's personal problems, which caused them to subsequently leave the WWF.

While the Road Warriors never officially broke up, Animal started making an increasing number of solo appearances after they left the WWF as Hegstrand struggled with drug and alcohol addiction.

=== Return to Japan, Australia and independent circuit (1999–2000) ===
After his release from WWF, the Road Warriors wrestled at the AJPW Giant Baba Memorial Show defeating Jun Akiyama and Kenta Kobashi in Tokyo, Japan on May 2, 1999. In 2000, the Road Warriors worked for i-Generation Superstars of Wrestling in Australia feuding with The Public Enemy over the i-Generation Tag Titles. They also worked in the independent circuit.

Later that year, Animal wrestled for Battlearts in Japan as Animal Warrior teaming with Alexander Otsuka.

=== Return to WCW (2001) ===
In January 2001, Animal returned with a prominent position in WCW as the "enforcer" of the stable known as The Magnificent Seven with the objective to protect WCW World Champion Scott Steiner. He appeared on the main event of Sin for the WCW World Heavyweight Championship against champion Scott Steiner, Jeff Jarrett and Sid Vicious in a four corners match. Steiner retained the title. The Magnificent Seven split up shortly before Vince McMahon purchased WCW in March 2001; Animal's contract was not one of the contracts the WWF picked up.

=== Later career (2001–2010) ===
After WCW folded, Animal reunited with Hawk at Jersey Championship Wrestling defeating the Moondogs 2000 in Lodi, New Jersey on September 8, 2001. The Road Warriors mainly continued working in the independent circuit.

On June 22, 2002, Animal returned with Hawk at International Wrestling Superstars defeating the Headshrinkers in Atlantic City, New Jersey. That win not only won the team USA tournament it would also become the last World Tag-Team Championship for Animal and Hawk as the Road Warriors.

On October 4, 2003, Animal won the IWS International Championship by defeating "Mr. Irresistible" Matt Hendrickson by pin at the Armory in Philadelphia, Pennsylvania. It was the first and only time that Animal held a singles championship title.

In 2002, Animal once again returned to All Japan Pro Wrestling as Animal Warrior teaming with Keiji Muto. In 2003, The Road Warriors last stint was for Fighting of World Japan Pro Wrestling feuding with the Shane Twins.

After Hawk's death, Animal returned to the ring nearly a year later focusing on his singles career. On May 11, 2008, Animal teamed with Power Warrior to defeat Damián 666 and El Terrible to win the UWA Tag titles for Toryumon Mexico Dragonmania III in Mexico City, Mexico. Animal would then retire from wrestling.

He returned for another match on April 17, 2010, teaming with Demolition (Ax and Smash), winning a 4-on-3 handicap match for Great Lakes Championship Wrestling in Waukesha, Wisconsin.

=== Total Nonstop Action Wrestling (2002–2003, 2007, 2016) ===
The Road Warriors appeared in Total Nonstop Action Wrestling in late 2002 to early 2003 as part of a group that opposed Vince Russo's faction Sports Entertainment Xtreme, but would only wrestle one actual match for the promotion.

On June 17, 2007, Road Warrior Animal returned to Total Nonstop Action Wrestling on the pay-per-view, Slammiversary, with Rick Steiner; he replaced Scott Steiner, who was out with an injury. They ended up losing to Team 3D.

On December 15, 2016, Animal returned to TNA for a guest appearance on the Impact Wrestling special, "Total Nonstop Deletion".

=== Second return to WWE (2003, 2005–2006, 2011–2012) ===
Animal and Hawk made a surprise appearance on Raw on May 12, 2003, when they took on Kane and Rob Van Dam for the World Tag Team Championship. This would be the last time the two would pair together as Hawk died later that year, on October 19, 2003.

Animal made a return to WWE on the July 14 episode of SmackDown! in 2005, where he was challenged by the then-WWE Tag Team Champions MNM to a title match at The Great American Bash. Finding a new tag team partner in Heidenreich, Animal went on to defeat MNM for the titles, dedicating the win to Hawk by saying, "Hawk, this one was for you, brother!" The two would team up for a few months in a new chapter of the Legion of Doom, with Heidenreich adopting the L.O.D.'s shoulder pads, face paint, and mohawk haircut. However, this came to an end with Heidenreich's release from WWE on January 17, 2006.

On the March 3, 2006, episode of SmackDown!, Animal teamed up with Matt Hardy to face MNM. After he and Hardy lost the match, Animal turned heel for the second time in his career by attacking and injuring Hardy's knee. Animal reasoned that he had realized that Hardy and Heidenreich were screw-ups and that Road Warrior Hawk was the only tag team legend and partner for him. After the heel turn, Animal, once again known simply as "The Road Warrior", would drop many aspects of the well-known Road Warrior gimmick, losing the face paint, and shoulder pads. Animal's look at this time was similar to his old Road Warrior gimmick in the early 1980s he had prior to teaming up with Hawk. On the March 17 episode of SmackDown!, Animal lost to Hardy in a Money in the Bank qualifying match. Animal was defeated by United States Champion Chris Benoit on the March 31 episode of SmackDown!.

Then Animal defeated Paul Burchill on the May 6, 2006, episode of Velocity. On June 26, 2006, Animal was released from his WWE contract.

WWE announced on March 28, 2011, on Raw that the Road Warriors would be inducted into the 2011 Hall of Fame. Animal also spoke openly about his future induction on Right After Wrestling just minutes after the announcement on WWE Raw. Animal told hosts, Arda Ocal and Jim Korderas that the WWE was going to create a physical Hall of Fame in Tampa and he was going to donate his trademarked 'spiked-shoulder pads' to that Hall.

On the July 20, 2012, episode of SmackDown on Syfy, Animal returned to face Heath Slater in honor of Raw's 1,000th episode. He went on to squash Slater. He then reappeared on the actual 1,000th episode on July 23 with other WWE Legends to help Lita take down Slater, in what would be Animal's final WWE appearance and the last match that he wrestled.

=== All In (2018) ===
On September 1, 2018, Animal made a surprise appearance at All In to open the event.

=== SWE FURY (2020) ===
On the June 12, 2020, episode of SWE Fury, a Plano, Texas–based nationally televised wrestling promotion, Teddy Long was named the new SWE General Manager alongside Road Warrior Animal, who served as his enforcer.

== Other media ==
=== Television ===
Year	Title	Role	Notes
2020	Dark Side of the Ring	Himself	"The Last Ride of The Road Warriors"

=== Video games ===
WCW video games
Year	Title	Notes
1990	WCW Wrestling	Video game debut Cover athlete

WWE video games
Year	Title	Notes
1991	WWF WrestleFest	Cover athlete
1992	WWF European Rampage Tour	
1992	WWF Super WrestleMania	Cover athlete
2003	WWE SmackDown! Here Comes the Pain	
2004	WWE SmackDown! vs. Raw	
2009	WWE Legends of WrestleMania	
2011	WWE All Stars	
2011	WWE '12	
2012	WWE '13	

Other wrestling video games
Year	Title	Notes
2001	Legends of Wrestling	Cover athlete
2002	Legends of Wrestling II	
2004	Showdown: Legends of Wrestling	

== Writing ==
Laurinaitis released an autobiography with William Andrew Wright titled The Road Warriors: Danger, Death, and the Rush of Wrestling on March 1, 2011, published by Medallion Press, Inc. The book talks about the rise of The Road Warriors, shares funny stories of life on the road, and offers behind-the-scenes accounts of professional wrestling.

== Personal life ==
Laurinaitis and his ex-wife Julie, a former powerlifter and bodybuilder, had two children, son James (born 1986) and daughter Jessica (born 1989). Laurinaitis also had a son named Joseph (born 1981) from a previous marriage. He coached youth football for Wayzata, the school his son played for.

Laurinaitis's brothers have both been involved in professional wrestling over the years. John Laurinaitis (Johnny Ace) is the former executive vice president of Talent Relations for World Wrestling Entertainment and a former wrestler. Marcus Laurinaitis is a former wrestler, mainly known as one half of the tag team The Wrecking Crew (Terminator / Fury).

Laurinaitis and his tag team partner Hegstrand owned two gyms in Minneapolis in the late 1980s. The pair, alongside gym employees Bob Truax and Dan Stock, conceptualized the Zubaz workout pants and helped popularize the brand globally. Laurinaitis owned 25% of the company until its closure in 1996.

Laurinaitis became a born again Christian in 2001.

Laurinaitis's son, James Laurinaitis, played linebacker for Ohio State University. As a sophomore, James won the Bronko Nagurski Trophy, given to the best defensive player in the country, and was a finalist for the Butkus Award, which is awarded to the best linebacker in the country. In 2007, James won the Butkus Award. In fact, Sports Illustrated made a joke about borrowing his father's shoulder pads and later did an interview with him that included a picture of him wearing them. He was drafted by the St. Louis Rams in the second round as the 35th overall pick in the 2009 NFL draft, and played with the Rams through the team's final season in St. Louis in 2015, after which he moved to the New Orleans Saints.

In July 2016, Laurinaitis was named part of a class action lawsuit filed against WWE which alleged that wrestlers incurred traumatic brain injuries during their tenure and that the company concealed the risks of injury. The suit was litigated by attorney Konstantine Kyros, who had been involved in a number of other lawsuits against WWE. US District Judge Vanessa Lynne Bryant dismissed the lawsuit in September 2018. An appeal was filed but the United States Court of Appeals for the Second Circuit dismissed it two weeks before Laurinaitis's death.

=== Death and legacy ===
Laurinaitis died of a heart attack on September 22, 2020, ten days after his 60th birthday, at the Margaritaville Resort (formerly known as the Tan-Tar-A Resort) in Osage Beach, Missouri. WWE released a statement regarding his death. Former Road Warriors manager Paul Ellering along with numerous others also paid tribute. It was later confirmed that Laurinaitis died from a sudden heart attack shortly after his and his wife's wedding anniversary celebrations. He had collapsed on the bed when he and his wife went back to their room.

In 2003 the Road Warriors were ranked number 1 of the 100 best tag teams of the "PWI Years". In 2010 Bleacher Report dubbed The Road Warriors the greatest tag team of all time. Stating "There is only one team that I can think of that truly changed the face of pro wrestling, and that team is the Road Warriors."

== Championships and accomplishments ==
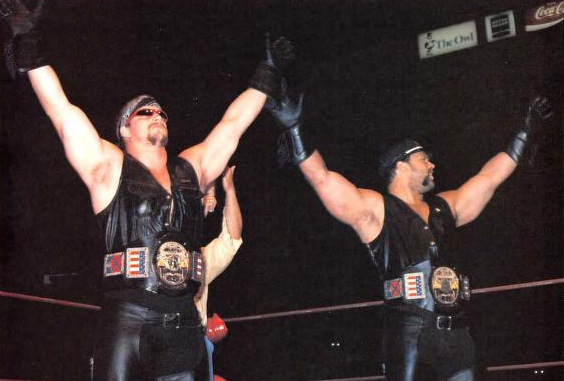
Animal (left) and Road Warrior Hawk as NWA National Tag Team Champions in 1983

- All Japan Pro Wrestling
  - NWA International Tag Team Championship (1 time) – with Road Warrior Hawk
- American Wrestling Association
  - AWA World Tag Team Championship (1 time) – with Road Warrior Hawk
- Cauliflower Alley Club
  - Tag Team Award (2020)
- George Tragos/Lou Thesz Professional Wrestling Hall of Fame
  - Frank Gotch Award (2012)
- Georgia Championship Wrestling
  - NWA National Tag Team Championship (4 times) – with Road Warrior Hawk
- i-Generation Superstars of Wrestling
  - i-Generation Tag Team Championship (3 times) – with Road Warrior Hawk
- Independent Pro Wrestling
  - IPW Tag Team Championship (1 time) – with Road Warrior Hawk
- International Wrestling Superstars
  - IWS World Tag Team Championship (1 time) – with Road Warrior Hawk
- Jim Crockett Promotions / World Championship Wrestling
  - NWA World Six-Man Tag Team Championship (3 times) – with Road Warrior Hawk and Dusty Rhodes (2) and Road Warrior Hawk and Genichiro Tenryu (1)^{1}
  - NWA World Tag Team Championship (Mid-Atlantic version) (1 time) – with Road Warrior Hawk
  - Iron Team Tournament (1989) – with Road Warrior Hawk
  - Jim Crockett, Sr. Memorial Cup (1986) – with Road Warrior Hawk
- Memphis Wrestling Hall of Fame
  - Class of 2022 – with Road Warrior Hawk
- Minnesota Wrestling Hall of Fame
  - Class of 2019
- National Wrestling Alliance
  - NWA Hall of Fame (Class of 2012)
  - NWA Legends Hall of Heroes (2016)
- Professional Championship Wrestling (Texas)
  - PCW Tag Team Championship (1 time) – with Road Warrior Hawk
- Professional Wrestling Hall of Fame and Museum
  - (Class of 2011) (As a member of The Road Warriors)
- Pro Wrestling Illustrated
  - PWI Comeback of the Year (2005)
  - PWI Feud of the Year (1987) with Road Warrior Hawk and The Super Powers (Dusty Rhodes and Nikita Koloff) vs. The Four Horsemen (Ric Flair, Arn Anderson, Tully Blanchard, and Lex Luger)
  - PWI Tag Team of the Year (1983–1985, 1988) with Road Warrior Hawk
  - PWI ranked him #64 of the 500 best singles wrestlers of the "PWI Years" in 2003
  - PWI ranked him #1 of the 100 best tag teams of the "PWI Years" with Road Warrior Hawk in 2003
- Quebec Wrestling Hall of Fame
  - Class of 2015 - with Road Warrior Hawk
- Super World of Sports
  - One Night Tag Team Tournament (1991) – with Hawk
- Toryumon Mexico
  - UWA World Tag Team Championship (1 time) – with Power Warrior
- Tokyo Sports
  - Best Foreigner Award (1985) with Road Warrior Hawk
- World Wrestling Federation / World Wrestling Entertainment / WWE
  - WWF Tag Team Championship (2 times) – with Road Warrior Hawk
  - WWE Tag Team Championship (1 time) – with Heidenreich
  - WWE Hall of Fame (Class of 2011) as a member of The Road Warriors
- Wrestling Observer Newsletter
  - Rookies of the Year (1983) with Road Warrior Hawk
  - Tag Team of the Year (1984) with Road Warrior Hawk
  - Strongest Wrestler (1985, 1986)
  - Wrestling Observer Newsletter Hall of Fame (Class of 1996)

^{1}The Road Warriors reign with the NWA World Six-Man Tag Team Championship, with Genichiro Tenryu, began December 7, 1988, after Ted Turner's purchase of Mid-Atlantic Championship Wrestling from Jim Crockett Jr. and having it renamed World Championship Wrestling.

^{2}Hawk and Animal's reign with this championship also happened after Ted Turner bought and renamed the promotion. However, it took place before the title was renamed the WCW World Tag Team Championship.

== See also ==
- List of premature professional wrestling deaths
