= Mat Mania =

1985 video game

- North American arcade flyer
- Developer: Technōs Japan
- Publishers: JP: Taito; NA: Memetron; NA: Atari Corporation
- Platforms: Arcade, Atari 7800, X68000
- Release: Arcade: JP: September 1985; NA: December 1985; Atari 7800; 1990
- Genres: Sports (professional wrestling)
- Mode: Multiplayer

Mat Mania, known in Japan as Exciting Hour: The ProWrestling Network (Note: Japanese: エキサイティング アワー ザ プロレスリング ネットワーク) or simply Exciting Hour, (Note: Japanese: エキサイティング アワー) is a 1985 wrestling video game developed by Technōs Japan and published by Taito for arcades. It is a spiritual successor to the 1983 arcade game Tag Team Wrestling, also developed by Technōs Japan, but published by Data East. The arcade game was a commercial success in Japan and North America, becoming the highest-grossing arcade conversion kit of 1986 in the United States.

An updated arcade version with a two-player competitive mode was released in 1986 as Mania Challenge. Atari Corporation released an Atari 7800 port in 1990, Mat Mania Challenge, which includes features of both games and lacks others. It was ported to the X68000 by Denpa with Shusse Ōzumō (1984). Mat Mania was re-released by Hamster Corporation for the PlayStation 4 as part of their Arcade Archives series in 2015 and the Nintendo Switch in 2019.

== Gameplay ==
Arcade version, showing the player (left) vs Insane Warrior (right)

The game is presented in the guise of a televised pro-wrestling broadcast, the Taito Wrestling Association (TWA) (Technos Wrestling Association in the Japanese version). The intro sequence and subsequent intermissions portray a disheveled pro-wrestling host, Cory (Nari in the Japanese version). His hair is unkempt and his sleeves rolled up as he manically announces the particulars of the upcoming bout.

The player controls a wrestler who makes his way through the ranks of the TWA, challenging various thematically colorful opponents, before finally challenging the champion in the fifth match. Upon ascending to the championship, the player is presented with a championship belt in a presentation ceremony. The player must then defend his title against the previous five opponents, drawn at random.

== Characters ==
=== The Player/Dynamite Tommy ===
The player-controlled wrestler was possibly modeled after The Dynamite Kid. Called simply "You" in Exciting Hour and Mat Mania, he is dubbed Dynamite Tommy (the Dynamite Kid's real name is Tom Billington) in Mania Challenge. However, there are signs held up in the crowd which read Fight Tommy and Tommy great, and since all the challengers have a name, the name Tommy could only refer to the unnamed player's character. He sports shaggy brown hair and wears blue trunks and white boots. His assortment of manoeuvres include: a punch and a high kick, and a shoulder block from a standing position; from a headlock, an Irish whip, a body slam, a piledriver, and a vertical suplex; upon a running opponent, a back body drop, an elbow smash, a clothesline or a jumping back kick; upon a downed opponent, a running body splash, or, from a turnbuckle, a sunset flip or a knee drop. The player-controlled wrestler is fashioned after common "babyface" performers of the era.

=== Insane Warrior ===
Misspelt "Insane Worrier" in Exciting Hour. He is fashioned after fanciful, dystopian punk/barbarian themed performers popular during the 80s (most notably Road Warrior Animal). Characteristically, he sports a Mohawk hairstyle, loose-fitting black trousers and heavy make-up. Accordingly, his maneuvers are limited to unskilled clubbing blows and a Gorilla Press body slam as his ultimate move. Also, unique from other opponents in that he pins the player-controlled wrestler using only one hand. He has the Player's Elbow Smash and Clothesline.

=== Karate Fighter ===
A martial arts themed wrestler. His silken, Manchu style trousers and slippers indicates something of a misnomer - Kung Fu Fighter seems more appropriate. Typically his maneuvers include fast, kicking strikes, jump kicks, and karate chops (used as a normal grasp and also as his finishing move). His hair is shaggy and covers his face, suggesting possible inspiration by The Great Kabuki, Chopsocky, or well-known martial artists such as Bruce Lee and Bolo Yeung. In the introductory sequence he is depicted with what would appear to be a set of nunchaku, but this weapon is not used during actual game-play. He is the only opponent who does not possess any of the Player's moves. Karate Fighter's character concept was later adapted by Technos for the Chin Taimei character featured in the NES version of Double Dragon.

=== Coco Savage ===
Named "Coco Savege" in the game. He is a "Wild Man" themed wrestler, clearly inspired by Bobo Brazil. Depicted wearing a Leopard skin and barefoot, he is unique from other opponents in that his attacking style is especially swift. He neither punches nor kicks; rather, he is the only opponent to use the shoulder block, the same used by the Player. His unorthodox and unpredictable fighting style includes shoulder blocks, coconuts (punches to the head while in a headlock), a Mongolian chop and giant swing throw as his finishing move, as well as a body splash on a downed opponent. He is quite possibly the most difficult opponent to beat in the game.

=== The Pirania ===
A masked "rúdo" themed wrestler fashioned after Mil Mascaras, who often used a mask with a shark teeth design. Pirania uses illegal tactics, like choking, and cheating to win his matches. He possesses the Player's back body drop. He also uses a Clawhold, performed after whipping the Player off the ropes, which drops the Player to his knees almost immediately. Perhaps his most effective, and most humiliating, move involves suspending the Player above the mat by grabbing his hair with one hand, and illegally gouging him square in the eyes with the other. He also uses an elbow drop as his ultimate move.

=== Golden Hulk ===
Named "Blues Bloody" in Exciting Hour. The TWA World Champion, who uses his strength and skill to overpower his opponent, clearly inspired by famed All Japan Pro Wrestling star, Bruiser Brody. In some versions of the game, the world champion changed to more closely resemble Hulk Hogan to reflect the rise of Hogan's popularity, although the character's furry boots (a la Brody) remained intact. He was named as Golden Hulk in Mat Mania for the purposes of U.S. licensing, likely to exploit the popular appeal of Hulk Hogan in that market. He uses Hogan's "Legdrop of Doom" as a finisher, which Brody also used. He also has the Player's body slam (performed one-armed - another homage to Brody) and Elbow Smash, plus a dropkick, which the player's character later gained in Mania Challenge.

== Ports ==
Atari Corporation released an Atari 7800 version in 1990 as Mat Mania Challenge. The company described it as a cross between Mat Mania and Mania Challenge, as the game includes both Dynamite Tommy and Hurricane Joe from the latter game, but it also omits all of the villain characters. A port to Atari 8-bit computers was planned but never released. A prototype was sold for a limited time by B&C ComputerVisions.

== Reception ==
In Japan, Exciting Hour was the highest-grossing table arcade unit of October 1985. In the United States, Mat Mania was the highest-grossing arcade conversion kit of 1986, and the year's third highest-grossing overall arcade game.

== Legacy ==
Mania Challenge is an updated version of Mat Mania released in 1986, a year after the original. It adds a two-player competitive mode, where the first player takes control of the main character from the original game, now named Dynamite Tommy, while the second player controls a new character named Hurricane Joe, who plays identically to Tommy. Mania Challenge also adds several countering techniques to the player's move set from Mat Mania such as countering a headlock with an atomic drop or a suplex, or throwing drop kicks. However, the character roster was reduced to only three opponents in the single player mode: the Insane Warrior, the Golden Hulk and the other player character controlled by the computer (Dynamite Tommy or Hurricane Joe), repeating those three opponents in subsequent loops.

Mat Mania was released for the PlayStation 4 in March 2015 and Nintendo Switch in December 2019 by Hamster Corporation under their Arcade Archives label under the name of Mat Mania Exciting Hour.
