= Zubaz =

Apparel brand

- Industry: Apparel
- Founded: 1988; 38 years ago
- Founders: Bob Truax; Dan Stock; Michael Hegstrand; Joseph Laurinaitis

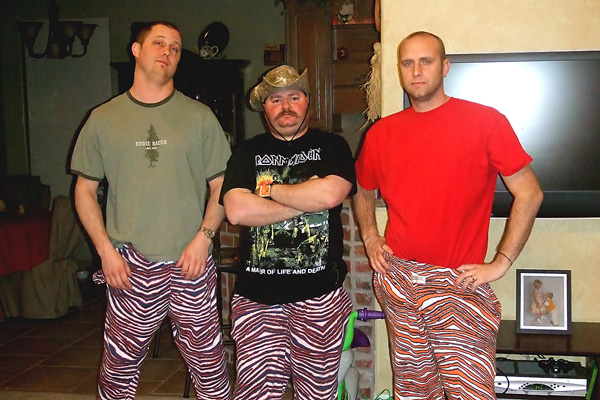
Enthusiasts wearing Zubaz brand pants at the 2008 Zubaz fan club barbecue in Choctaw, Oklahoma

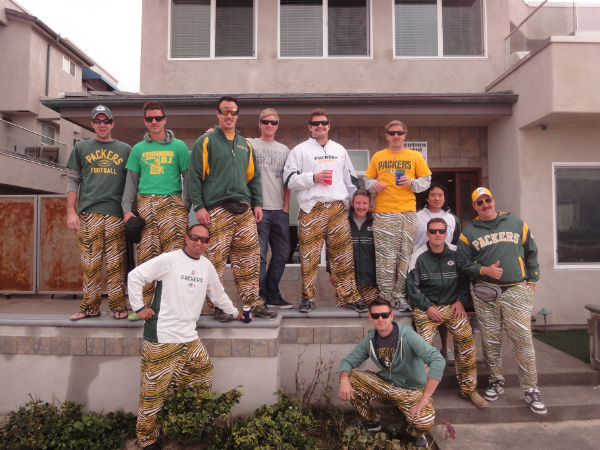
Green Bay Packer and Zubaz enthusiasts at the San Diego Boardwalk before the Green Bay Packers and San Diego Chargers game on November 6, 2011

Zubaz (/ˈzuːbæz/) is a brand of shorts and pants, distinctively patterned with colorful stripes, that became popular during the early 1990s. It was primarily marketed as athletic wear for weightlifting and wrestling but found wider success.

== History and description ==
In 1988, professional wrestlers Michael Hegstrand & Joseph Laurinaitis brainstormed ideas with Bob Truax and Don Stock, managers at gyms the pair owned, for better quality workout pants. Laurinaitis said, “We need to come up with an idea for pants that we can make for big guys for leisure, sporting events, working out or whatever.” Truax and Stock developed a comfortably baggy pair of shorts with an elastic waistband. Zubaz was registered as a trademark in 1989. Initially, they were marketed as a comfortable, functional pair of shorts for weightlifting.

Hegstrand and Laurinaitis, who owned half the company, helped popularize the pants, wearing them while teaming as the Road Warriors on the NWA on TBS. Soon after, distribution with JCPenney and high-profile marketing deals with NFL players such as Dan Marino helped the pants become wildly popular in the United States. The Zubaz company sold $100 million worth of products in 1991 alone. The company slogan is "Dare to be Different." The company is named after a nonsensical phrase of excitement that Laurinaitis heard on playgrounds growing up in St. Paul.

Although Zubaz began as a line of shorts, the brand was extended into long pants, caps, shirts, and even diapers. The pants are tapered at the ankle, with the outer part of the leg being longer than the inner part. They have an elastic waistband to allow for greater flexibility and movement. The pants were originally created in a zebra print but were later sold in many other prints.

Regardless of the specific design, Zubaz are almost always bright and flashy and are often ostentatious. Zubaz designed the uniforms of several Arena Football League teams in the early 1990s, including the Tampa Bay Storm and the now-defunct New Orleans Night. However, these designs were considered outlandish and were soon replaced.

In a 1993 survey in Inside Sports magazine, Zubaz finished third in the voting for "Worst Thing to Happen in Sports" that year. Ahead of it were the retirement of Michael Jordan and the death of wrestler Dino Bravo.

The long pants were the most popular item in the product line. Despite the decline in popularity, fans still sometimes wear Zubaz pants in team colors at professional football games.

Zubaz manufactured "slider shorts". These shorts had the famous wild patterns at the bottom of the garment while the rest of the garment displayed the name and logo of a sport team and the Zubaz name.

The original business went bankrupt in 1996, and Truax and Stock bought back the trademark rights. In 2007, Zubaz resurfaced, offering a limited production release of the original classic Zubaz patterns. In 2014 the brand fully resurfaced with a wider selection on its Internet storefront. The revived brand opened its first storefront in Fashion Outlets of Niagara Falls, a mall in Niagara Falls, New York, in November 2016; Zubaz chose Western New York as its first brick-and-mortar location because of the brand's particular association with the Buffalo Bills, as fans of the franchise have consistently been one of the brand's most loyal customer bases.

On July 16, 2008, the Saint Paul Saints independent professional baseball team wore Zubaz pants during their game against the Sioux City Explorers. The bases were also painted in a recognizable Zubaz tiger-striped pattern. On the December 6 edition of professional wrestling TV show TNA Impact, Christopher Daniels and Kazarian wrestled the main event in pink and black Zubaz pants. The Russian curling team wore Zubaz pants in the 2014 Winter Olympics. The Detroit Tigers also wore Zubaz pants in 2017.

Minnesota Vikings mascot Viktor the Viking usually wears team-colored Zubaz pants.
