= Road Warriors =

Professional wrestling tag team

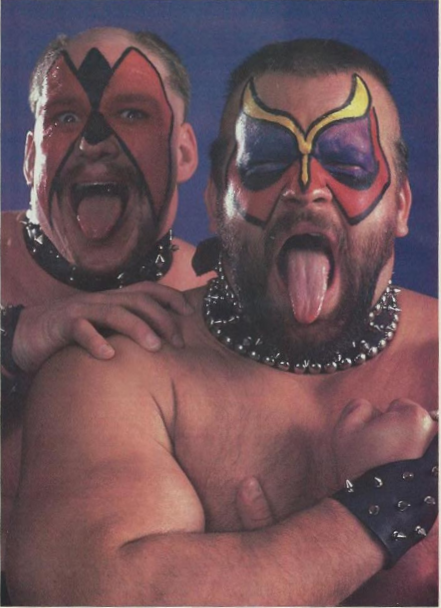
- The Road Warriors, c. 1986

Stable
- Name(s): Road Warriors; Legion of Doom; Hell Raisers; Triple Warriors; LOD 2000; LOD 2005; Hell Warriors
- Members: Road Warrior Hawk; Road Warrior Animal; Power Warrior; Droz; Heidenreich
- Manager(s): Paul Ellering; Sunny; Christy Hemme
- Combined billed weight: 575 lb (261 kg; 41.1 st)
- Billed from: Chicago, Illinois
- Debut: 1983
- Disbanded: 2014
- Years active: 1983–2014

The Road Warriors, also known as the Legion of Doom, were a professional wrestling tag team originally composed of Road Warrior Hawk (Michael Hegstrand) and Road Warrior Animal (Joseph Laurinaitis). They performed under the name "The Road Warriors" in the American Wrestling Association (AWA), the National Wrestling Alliance (NWA), and World Championship Wrestling (WCW), and the name "Legion of Doom" (LOD) in the World Wrestling Federation (WWF). Under either name, their gimmick was the same – two imposing wrestlers in face paint. For brief periods, other wrestlers were added as stand-in partners for both men. In Japan in the 1990s, "Power Warrior" Kensuke Sasaki often teamed with Hawk and Animal, separately and together, while in WWE were joined by Droz in the 1990s and Heidenreich in the 2000s. The team also had three managers: Sunny in the 1990s, Christy Hemme in the 2000s, and Paul Ellering, the manager associated with the original team.

Hawk and Animal were known for their impressive physiques, as their physical size was larger than most wrestlers of the era. Their face paint and spiked armor were inspired by the Mad Max film The Road Warrior; they were one of the first wrestlers to bring a theme from a movie into the wrestling world. They also introduced a tandem maneuver known as the Doomsday Device. Both men used the move as a team finisher throughout their careers, even when teaming with other partners.

The duo headlined multiple events including Survivor Series in 1991 and In Your House 16: Canadian Stampede, and are regarded by many as the greatest tag team in professional wrestling history.

== History ==
=== Georgia Championship Wrestling (1983–1984) ===
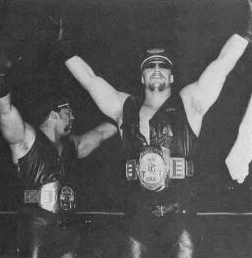
The Road Warriors with the NWA National Tag Team Championship, c. 1983

Joe Laurinaitis had briefly competed as the Road Warrior before Ole Anderson paired him up with Mike Hegstrand to form the Road Warriors in 1983. They were initially brought into "Precious" Paul Ellering's stable as a replacement for his team of Matt Borne and Arn Anderson after Borne was fired from the company. After a few months of rapid success, the Road Warriors dumped Ellering as manager, claiming that they did not need a manager. This was short-lived, as in early 1984, they and "Precious" Paul Ellering formed a stable called the Legion of Doom in the National Wrestling Alliance (NWA)'s Georgia Championship Wrestling (GCW) territory. The group was managed by Ellering and consisted of the Road Warriors, King Kong Bundy, Jake "The Snake" Roberts, and The Spoiler. The stable was short-lived and the name "Legion of Doom" soon referred only to the Road Warriors and Ellering with either name used interchangeably throughout their career. Animal reveals in the Road Warriors: The Life and Death of the Most Dominant Tag-Team in Wrestling History DVD set that the name "Legion of Doom" was taken from the Super Friends cartoon.

The Road Warriors' high-impact powerhouse style and unique attire quickly got them noticed by fans and dreaded by opponents, so much so that some wrestlers would grab their bag and leave the arena when they saw they were scheduled to face the Road Warriors. In GCW, the team quickly rose to the top despite being very young and having not undergone the traditional "paying dues" period simply because they were so believable in their role. They gained a reputation for being very stiff and not selling simply because they could, and most of their matches ended quickly as a result. They won the NWA National Tag Team Championship upon their debut, a title they would win two more times while in Georgia.

=== The Road Warrior look ===
The original look for the Road Warriors was a pair of bikers in leather vests and biker hats and sunglasses, according to Animal he felt uncomfortable with the biker gimmick because it made him look like the biker from the Village People. However, Ole Anderson suggested that they needed face paint and mohawks.

Originally their face paint design was random, but later Hawk's well-known look was the double mohawk with a joker look style make up. Animal's well-known look was a Mr. T style mohawk with a long thin mullet in the back and his makeup design was a black spider on his forehead. When the team signed with the World Wrestling Federation in 1990. Hawk sported a small rat tail on the back of his head, but shaved it off shortly before SummerSlam 91.

=== American Wrestling Association (1984–1986) ===
In 1984, the Road Warriors moved on to Verne Gagne's American Wrestling Association (AWA) along with their manager Paul Ellering. On August 25, 1984, they defeated The Crusher and Baron von Raschke for the AWA World Tag Team Championship. The Road Warriors were brought in by Gagne to work as heels, but their squash matches soon won over fans. They became the AWA's top draw throughout 1984 and 1985, feuding primarily with The Fabulous Ones and later The Fabulous Freebirds. The Warriors then began splitting their time between the AWA and Jim Crockett Promotions (JCP) where they started feuding with NWA World tag team champions The Russians, all while still holding the AWA belts (the AWA and various NWA members were co-promoting cards at the time, in an effort to compete with the World Wrestling Federation). Hawk and Animal eventually lost the AWA title to Jimmy Garvin and "Mr. Electricity" Steve Regal on September 29, 1985, due to the interference of the Freebirds. The Road Warriors' last appearance in the AWA was on April 20, 1986, at WrestleRock where they defeated the team of Garvin and Michael Hayes in a steel cage match.

During their AWA stint the team became well known for using a re-arranged version of Black Sabbath's "Iron Man" titled "We are Iron Men" as their entrance theme.

=== Japanese promotions (1985–1990) ===
In March 1985, the Road Warriors began touring Japan, mainly with All Japan Pro Wrestling (AJPW) where they made an immediate impact squashing the monster team of Killer Khan and Animal Hamaguchi in under 4 minutes. This and subsequent dominant victories garnered the Road Warriors a lot of Japanese wrestling media headlines and front-page stories. Their tours with AJPW in 1985 and 1986 made the Road Warriors such legends in Japan that they toured the country whenever they were "between contracts" of the big three.

The Road Warriors won the NWA International Tag Team Championship on March 12, 1987, from Jumbo Tsuruta and Genichiro Tenryu and would hold them for 15 months before losing them to PWF World Tag Team champions Jumbo Tsuruta and Yoshiaki Yatsu to unify the titles as the AJPW World Tag Team titles, making the Road Warriors the last defending champions of the NWA International Tag Team titles. Their last match in Japan during this period was on July 22, 1990, for New Japan Pro-Wrestling (NJPW), losing to Masahiro Chono and Keiji Mutoh by disqualification.

=== Jim Crockett Promotions/World Championship Wrestling (1986–1990) ===
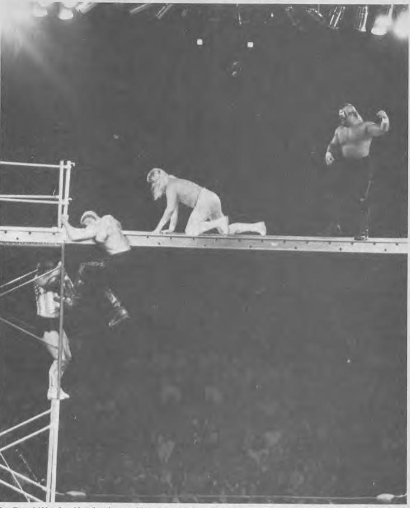
Scaffold match between the Road Warriors and the Midnight Express at Starrcade '86: The Skywalkers

On April 19, 1986, The Road Warriors won the inaugural Jim Crockett, Sr. Memorial Cup Tag Team Tournament by beating Ron Garvin and Magnum T. A. in the finals. Building upon their rapid push, Hawk and Animal were featured attractions of The Great American Bash 1986 tour where they were matched against Ivan and Nikita Koloff as well as the Midnight Express. At Starrcade '86: The Skywalkers, the Road Warriors were featured in a Scaffold Match, defeating the Midnight Express.

The Warriors joined forces with Dusty Rhodes and Nikita Koloff in a bloody feud with The Four Horsemen. During the 1987 Great American Bash, the rival sides faced off in the first ever WarGames match. The Road Warriors were on the winning side of War Games both matches that summer taking their feud with the Horsemen to Starrcade 1987, where they lost by disqualification to Tully Blanchard and Arn Anderson. The Road Warriors also picked up the NWA World Six-Man Tag Team Championship twice alongside Dusty Rhodes. The Warriors engaged in a violent feud with The Powers of Pain (The Barbarian and The Warlord) where the Road Warriors finally met their equal physically, but the angle ended when the Powers of Pain left JCP after finding out they were booked against the Road Warriors in a series of Scaffold Matches that they were supposed to lose.

In 1988, Hawk and Animal turned heel, attacking substitute partner Sting during a defense of the Six-Man championship. They finally won the NWA World Tag Team Championship on October 29, 1988, in New Orleans, Louisiana, at a house show against the Midnight Express. In November of that year the Road Warriors played a role in ending Dusty Rhodes' tenure as head booker for the promotion. During the November 26 episode of World Championship Wrestling, which was under strict instructions from TBS television executives prohibiting blading, the Road Warriors attacked Rhodes, removed a spike from their shoulder pads, and attempted to gouge his eye out. Rhodes was fired for that episode shortly after Starrcade 1988. Before Rhodes was fired, Animal beat him at the Clash of the Champions, so the Road Warriors were allowed to pick a new partner to hold the NWA World Six-Man Tag Team titles; they picked AJPW superstar Genichiro Tenryu, but the titles were quickly abandoned.

The Road Warriors quickly turned face yet again due to overwhelming fan support no matter how brutal or violent they were. Their World Tag Team title reign came to an end when they faced The Varsity Club (Mike Rotunda and Steve Williams) on April 2, 1989. The title change was a controversial one as referee Teddy Long performed an excessively fast count. Long would be fired from his job due to the count but the titles were not returned to the Road Warriors. Hawk and Animal would spend the rest of their tenure in World Championship Wrestling (WCW) (as JCP became known after being purchased by Turner Broadcasting System in 1988) feuding with teams like The Samoan Swat Team and The Skyscrapers. Their last big wins in WCW came when they defeated three other teams (including the red hot Steiner Brothers) to win the Ironman Tag Team Tournament at Starrcade 1989 "Future Shock" (The Steiners actually defeated the Warriors by pinfall in their match, but the Warriors won the round robin style tournament on a point system basis.) and over The Skyscrapers in a Chicago Street Fight at WrestleWar '90: Wild Thing.

The Road Warriors made their last WCW pay-per-view appearance on May 19, 1990, at Capital Combat where they teamed with Norman "The Lunatic" against Kevin Sullivan, Cactus Jack and Bam Bam Bigelow in a match that was cut from the commercial tape of the event. They left WCW in June 1990 due to heat with then-WCW head Jim Herd according to Animal on their WWE produced DVD.

=== World Wrestling Federation (1990–1992) ===
When Hawk and Animal signed with the World Wrestling Federation (WWF) in June 1990, Vince McMahon retired the Road Warriors moniker, since at the time there were other wrestlers with "warrior" in their names, such as Ultimate Warrior and Kerry Von Erich "The Modern Day Warrior". They both made their TV debuts on the July 15, 1990, episode of Wrestling Challenge. In the WWF the team would be known only as the "Legion of Doom". As Legion of Doom, their detractors such as Bobby Heenan would mock them by referring to them as "Legion of Dummies". Ellering also signed with the WWF because he was still their agent but wasn't assigned to be the on-screen manager for the team and was put in a backstage role.

Hawk and Animal immediately entered into a feud with Demolition, the team McMahon had created in their likeness three years earlier, which led into a televised six-man tag-team match where Hawk and Animal teamed up with WWF World Heavyweight Champion Ultimate Warrior against the three members of Demolition. Bill Eadie (Ax) was having health issues and an agreement was made to phase him out and eventually replace him with Crush (Brian Adams), while Barry Darsow continued in his role of Smash. Ax was moved into a role as manager for the team with the hope of taking a front office position, which eventually fell through. The Legion of Doom / Demolition feud did not have the expected intensity because of the change and LOD soon set their sights on the tag team titles. At SummerSlam 1991 in Madison Square Garden, the Legion of Doom defeated The Nasty Boys in a no DQ street fight to win the World Tag Team Championship, becoming the only team to win world tag titles in all three of the top promotions of the 1980s. Hawk and Animal would eventually lose the titles to Money Inc. (IRS (Mike Rotunda) and Ted DiBiase) on February 7, 1992, after which they briefly left the promotion.

At WrestleMania VIII, the team returned to the company during an interview with Gene Okerlund and Ellering returned to be the team's on-screen manager. The team later incorporated a ventriloquist dummy called "Rocco" (Originally introduced as "Freckles" in front of a live crowd at a WWF TV Taping, the segment bombed so badly that it never aired) which served as their "inspiration", but this gimmick was short-lived. Hegstrand left the company in disgust with the Rocco gimmick immediately after SummerSlam 1992 at the Wembley Stadium where LOD rode to the ring on motorbikes in front of over 80,000 fans. He then went AWOL in London after the event with John Nord (The Berzerker) and missed the flight back to the U.S., while Laurinaitis stuck around and finished the team's contractual obligations with former Demolition member Crush (now repackaged from his Demolition character to being a face, becoming a tanned muscle guy from the beaches of his native Hawaii) replacing Hawk on house shows in Europe in mid September 1992, after Hawk left the WWF. Crush and Animal teamed to defeat The Beverly Brothers five times and Kato and Skinner once. Paul Ellering also joined Crush and Animal in some six man tag team matches. When the newly formed team returned to North America, Animal and Crush both started wrestling singles matches and the team was no more. Shortly after Animal then left the WWF, because an injury to his back forced him into a lengthy hiatus.

=== New Japan Pro-Wrestling- Hell Raisers (1992–1996) ===
The Hell Raisers

Tag team
- Members: Hawk Warrior; Power Warrior
- Billed heights: 6 ft 3 in (1.91 m) – Hawk Warrior; 5 ft 11 in (1.80 m) – Power Warrior
- Combined billed weight: 518 lb (235 kg)
- Debut: 1992
- Disbanded: 1996
- Years active: 1992–1995; 1996

When Hawk left the WWF after SummerSlam 1992 he traveled to Japan and started working for New Japan Pro-Wrestling (NJPW) where he quickly teamed up with young mid-carder Kensuke Sasaki who was soon dubbed "Power Warrior" as he adopted the trademark Road Warrior face paint and spiked shoulder pads. The duo was dubbed "The Hell Raisers" and carried on the legacy of the Road Warriors in NJPW winning the IWGP Tag Team Championship from Tony Halme and Scott Norton in December 1992 and then again from the team of Scott Norton and Hercules (known as the Jurassic Powers) in January 1994. They also competed in both the 1993 and 1994 versions of the Super Grade Tag league making it to the semi-finals of the 1994 tournament before losing to Masahiro Chono and Super Strong Machine.

Teaming with Hawk (dubbed "Hawk Warrior") helped elevate Kensuke Sasaki in the eyes of the fans, so much so that when the Hell Raisers broke up in September 1995, Sasaki shed the Power Warrior gimmick and became a main eventer on the singles scene. On special occasions, Sasaki would break out the "Power Warrior" persona, similar to Keiji Mutoh and his "Great Muta" persona. During this stint, they used the theme song "Hellraiser" by Ozzy Osbourne.

When Animal came back from his back injury, he joined the duo in Japan in April 1996. The three were announced collectively as the Road Warriors, using "Iron Man" as their theme music. They continued as a trio while Animal and Hawk were under contract with World Championship Wrestling. Hawk and Sasaki had one last match together on September 19, 1996, when they defeated Keiji Mutoh and Junji Hirata. The trio continued working together until their last match on December 8, 1996, when they lost to Mutoh, Manabu Nakanishi and Satoshi Kojima. Animal and Hawk returned to the World Wrestling Federation.

=== Return to WCW (1996) ===
When Laurinaitis' back was finally healed enough for him to return to wrestling, the Road Warriors signed a contract with WCW in late 1995 and debuted in January 1996. They returned as tweeners and immediately started a feud with the returning Steiner Brothers, The Nasty Boys and Harlem Heat before moving on to challenging the WCW Tag Team Champions Sting and Lex Luger. The Road Warriors had several shots at the champions but failed to win the titles.

Hegstrand and Laurinaitis stayed with WCW for about four months, before leaving over a dispute with Eric Bischoff. The pair made claims that Bischoff promised them a second-highest paid contract, as well as a separate contract from Japan, something which he denies remembering.

=== Return to the WWF (1997–1999) ===
==== Early feuds (1997–1998) ====
After leaving WCW, the duo took various independent bookings both in the U.S. and Japan before signing with the WWF, making their surprise return on the February 24, 1997, edition of Monday Night Raw where they destroyed the Headbangers, despite both teams being counted out. Even though the "Road Warrior" name wasn't used or mentioned during their original WWF run, Hawk and Animal were referred to as "Road Warrior Hawk" and "Road Warrior Animal" and "The Road Warriors" name was used as a nickname for the team. The Legion of Doom then went on to team with Ahmed Johnson to face Faarooq, Crush, and Savio Vega of the Nation of Domination in a Street Fight at Wrestlemania 13 in their home town of Chicago. After defeating The Nation, they went on to perform the Doomsday Device on the team of PG 13. Before the match, Ahmed was given special shoulder pads like the LOD wear, however they were never returned due to Hawk giving them to Johnson. The Legion of Doom would be heavily involved in the feud with the Hart Foundation siding with Stone Cold Steve Austin, Ken Shamrock and Goldust at In Your House: Canadian Stampede. The Legion of Doom also became 2-time WWF tag team champions on October 13, 1997, when they defeated The Godwinns. In November 1997, the Legion of Doom faced the newly formed New Age Outlaws (Road Dogg and Billy Gunn) and lost the titles to the upstart team.

The Legion of Doom would challenge the Outlaws several times in the next couple of months but could not win the gold. On one episode of Raw, the Outlaws shaved the head of Road Warrior Hawk and were beaten down further by DX. On February 23, 1998, on Raw, the Legion of Doom seemed to have won the Tag Team titles back when they hit the Doomsday Device, but as Animal went for the pin, the referee was distracted by Hawk's celebration, allowing the Outlaws to take advantage and win the match. After the match, the Legion of Doom brawled with one another out of frustration and weren't seen on WWE television after that, indicating that the team was disbanded for good.

==== LOD 2000 (1998–1999) ====
Hawk and Animal next appeared as Legion of Doom 2000, billed as an updated version of the Road Warriors "for the new millennium", at WrestleMania XIV during a tag team Battle Royal. The duo sported a new look, including new shoulder pads and helmets (the helmets wouldn't last long, as Hawk got rid of his by throwing it to the crowd) and a new manager in Sunny. LOD 2000 won the battle royal and earned a shot at the tag team titles, but did not manage to win the gold.

Sunny soon left the team and Droz, then known as Puke (Darren Drozdov, a former defensive end for the Denver Broncos who earned the name Puke when caught vomiting on Monday Night Football), started to accompany them to the ring. At the same time, Paul Ellering returned, but sided with the Disciples of Apocalypse (DOA), whom LOD were feuding with at the time; Ellering and Animal explained on the DVD it was hard for them to rip on each other on promos. For the second time in the history of the Road Warriors they participated in a storyline where tension arose between the members, teasing a break up. In this storyline, Hawk was seen by his partner Animal as unfit to wrestle and Puke was tapped to take Hawk's place in the tag team as an official member. The angle played off Hegstrand's real life alcohol and drug issues, going so far as to faking a suicide jump off the top of the TitanTron on the November 16, 1998 episode of Raw. After the angle bombed and both Hegstrand and Laurinaitis voiced their objections to it, the angle was dropped.

The Legion of Doom made a very brief return, first on the March 22, 1999 Raw is War by attacking Pat Patterson and Gerald Brisco in a backstage skit after the two impersonated LOD in a handicap match against Shane McMahon, on the March 15, 1999 Raw is War. Both LOD entered the pre-WrestleMania battle royal with the last two participants getting a tag team title shot later at WrestleMania XV but both came up short. They would make one final appearance on the March 29, 1999 Raw challenging Owen Hart and Jeff Jarrett for the tag team titles but failed; they left the WWF afterwards.

=== Japan and the independent circuit (1999–2003) ===
After leaving the WWF, the Road Warriors would appear for various independent federations

On May 2, 1999, they returned to All Japan Pro Wrestling to team with Johnny Ace as they defeated Jun Akiyama, Kenta Kobashi, and Hakushi at the Giant Baba Memorial Show. Then they went to Australia winning the iGW Tag Team Titles against Public Enemy for i-Generation pay-per-view on June 30, 2000. They performed both as a team and individually.

Animal would return to World Championship Wrestling and competed solo in WCW in early 2001 before WWF bought the company in March 2001. Hegstrand dealt with his personal issues.

In 2001 they feuded with The Nasty Boys for the Xcitement Wrestling Federation. On June 22, 2002, performing for International Wrestling Superstars (IWS), Road Warriors Animal and Hawk defeated the Headshrinkers for the World Tag-Team Championship. That victory also led to Team USA winning the international tournament held in Atlantic City, New Jersey.

The Road Warriors also appeared very briefly in Total Nonstop Action Wrestling (TNA) during the early days of the promotion, saving America's Most Wanted, and debuting to what Jeremy Borash quoted as "A 1985 Road Warrior Pop".

Hegstrand and Laurinaitis became born-again Christians in 2001, and would later appear on Ted DiBiase's religion and wrestling shows in 2003. It was during this time that Hegstrand overcame his drug and alcohol addictions.

=== Second return to WWE and Hawk's death (2003) ===
The Road Warriors' last US TV appearance as a team occurred on the May 12, 2003 Raw episode in a tag team match against the World Tag Team Champions, Rob Van Dam and Kane. The Road Warriors had hoped to get a full-time contract with WWE but nothing ever came of it.

Once again they returned to Japan competing in Fighting Of World Japan Pro-Wrestling defeating The Shane Twins for the Tag Team titles on March 1, 2003. They dropped the titles to the Twins three months later in their last televised appearance on June 29, 2003. Their last match was on October 3, 2003, in Oshawa, Ontario, at a local church, defeating Greg "The Hammer" Valentine and Buff Bagwell.

The Road Warriors last autograph appearance took place in Burton, MI on October 4, 2003, with LWA Owner and Promoter, Steve Rau of Mid-Michigan. This event took place at Sharky's Sports Bar in Burton, MI. This event was to promote Steve Rau's show called the Legends of Wrestling. The show took place on November 1, 2003, at the Birch Run Expo Center. Steve Rau re-arranged the Main Event of the night, that was to feature the Road Warriors versus the Powers of Pain, Barbarian and Warlord managed by Mouth of the South Jimmy Hart. Steve Rau received a phone call from Heath Santo, a wrestling writer from Ohio. Heath Santo told Steve Rau the news of Hawk's passing on October 19, 2003. Steve Rau went back to the WJRT ABC 12 TV studio in Flint, MI where they edited the television commercial. Steve Rau then announced that the Legends of Wrestling show was going to be a Hawk Tribute Show, the first of many that were to take place. Animal still came to the event, as the special guest referee. The Main Event was changed to The Powers of Pain versus Greg the Hammer Valentine and Brutus the Barber Beefcake. Animal was a special guest referee. At one point in the evening, Animal along with the other star studded roster came to the ring where Animal addressed the crowd and where a 10 bell salute was given.

=== Animal's later years ===
==== LOD 2005 (2005–2006) ====
Animal would later return to WWE in July 2005, teaming with Heidenreich in a feud against the tag team MNM. At The Great American Bash on July 24, 2005, Animal and Heidenreich defeated MNM to win the WWE Tag Team Championship in a match personally dedicated by Animal to Hawk. After winning the titles Heidenreich changed his appearance, to a look that better suited the Legion of Doom image by shaving his hair into a mohawk and wearing face paint. On August 18, 2005, Heidenreich was officially made part of LOD and was presented with his own "Road Warrior spikes". Shortly after winning the tag team titles, Animal paid tribute to his late partner and friend by looking up to the heavens above and saying, "Hawk, this one's for you, brother!". During their feud with MNM, LOD were joined by Christy Hemme, who acted as a valet/manager for a short while. On the October 28, 2005, edition of SmackDown!, LOD lost the tag team titles to MNM in a Fatal Four-Way tag match that also featured Paul Burchill and William Regal and The Mexicools (Super Crazy and Psicosis). A few months later, on January 17, 2006, Heidenreich was released from WWE. Animal continued to perform for WWE under his old persona, The Road Warrior, for a few months before he was also released.

The Hell Warriors

Tag team
- Members: Animal Warrior; Power Warrior
- Billed heights: 6 ft 1 in (1.85 m) – Animal Warrior; 5 ft 11 in (1.80 m) – Power Warrior
- Combined billed weight: 528 lb (239 kg)
- Debut: September 1, 2007
- Disbanded: February 13, 2014

==== The Hell Warriors and Animal's death (2007–2020) ====
On September 1, 2007, Road Warrior Animal appeared for All Japan Pro Wrestling (AJPW) and teamed with Sasaki to form the Hell Warriors, with Animal being billed as "Animal Warrior" to match up with Sasaki's "Power Warrior" and Hawk's "Hawk Warrior" gimmick. The newly formed Hell Warriors defeated the team of "brother" YASSHI and Shuji Kondo. Their theme music was a megamix of "Iron Man" by Black Sabbath and "Hellraiser" by Ozzy Osbourne.

On May 11, 2008, The Hell Warriors wrestled in Toryumon Mexico's Dragon-Mania show. They defeated Damián el Terrible and Damián 666 to win the UWA World Tag Team Championship (not the same championship revived by El Dorado Wrestling).

On April 2, 2011, The Road Warriors, along with Paul Ellering, were inducted into the WWE Hall of Fame by Dusty Rhodes. On February 13, 2014, Power Warrior announced his retirement from professional wrestling, ending The Hell Warriors' run.

Road Warrior Animal died after suffering a heart attack on September 22, 2020.

== Incarnations ==
- The Road Warriors / Legion of Doom
  - Road Warrior Hawk
  - Road Warrior Animal
  - Power Warrior (when in six-man tag team matches in Japan)
  - "Precious" Paul Ellering (manager)
- The Hell Raisers
  - Hawk Warrior
  - Power Warrior
- Triple Warriors
  - Hawk Warrior
  - Animal Warrior
  - Power Warrior
- LOD 2000
  - Road Warrior Hawk
  - Road Warrior Animal
  - Puke/Droz
  - Sunny (valet)
- LOD 2005
  - Road Warrior Animal
  - Heidenreich
  - Christy Hemme (valet)
- The Hell Warriors
  - Animal Warrior
  - Power Warrior

== Video games appearances ==
WCW video games
Year	Title	Notes
1990	WCW Wrestling	Video game debut Cover athletes

WWE video games
Year	Title	Notes
1991	WWF WrestleFest	Cover athletes
1992	WWF European Rampage Tour	
1992	WWF Super WrestleMania	Cover athletes
2003	WWE SmackDown! Here Comes the Pain	
2004	WWE SmackDown! vs. Raw	
2009	WWE Legends of WrestleMania	
2011	WWE All Stars	
2011	WWE '12	
2012	WWE '13	

Other wrestling video games
Year	Title	Notes
2001	Legends of Wrestling	Cover athletes
2002	Legends of Wrestling II	
2004	Showdown: Legends of Wrestling	

== Championships and accomplishments ==
=== Road Warriors / Legion of Doom / LOD 2000 ===
- All Japan Pro Wrestling
  - NWA International Tag Team Championship (1 time)
- American Wrestling Association
  - AWA World Tag Team Championship (1 time)
- Cauliflower Alley Club
  - Tag Team Award (2020)
- Fighting World of Japan Pro Wrestling
  - World Japan Tag Team Championship (1 time)
- Georgia Championship Wrestling
  - NWA National Tag Team Championship (3 times)
  - NWA National Tag Team Championship Tournament (1984)
- Hardcore Hall of Fame
  - Class of 2021
- International Wrestling Superstars
  - IWS World Tag Team Championship (1 time)
- i-Generation Superstars of Wrestling
  - i-Generation Tag Team Championship (3 times)
- Independent Pro Wrestling
  - IPW Tag Team Championship (1 time)
- Jim Crockett Promotions/World Championship Wrestling
  - NWA World Six-Man Tag Team Championship (3 times) – with Dusty Rhodes (2) and Genichiro Tenryu (1)
  - NWA World Tag Team Championship (1 time)
  - Iron Team Tournament (1989)
  - Jim Crockett, Sr. Memorial Cup (1986)
- Memphis Wrestling Hall of Fame
  - Class of 2022
- National Wrestling Alliance
  - NWA Hall of Fame (Class of 2012)
  - NWA Wrestling Legends Hall of Heroes (2016)
- Professional Wrestling Hall of Fame and Museum
  - Class of 2011 (Inducted Members: Road Warrior Animal, Road Warrior Hawk, and Paul Ellering)
- Pro Wrestling Illustrated
  - PWI Tag Team of the Year (1983–1985, 1988)
  - PWI Feud of the Year (1987) with Dusty Rhodes and Nikita Koloff vs. Four Horsemen
  - PWI ranked them #1 of the 100 best tag teams during the "PWI Years" in 2003
- Quebec Wrestling Hall of Fame
  - Class of 2015
- Super World of Sports
  - One Night Tag Team Tournament (1991)
- Tokyo Sports
  - Best Foreigner Award (1985)
- World Wrestling Federation/WWE
  - WWF Tag Team Championship (2 times)
  - WWE Hall of Fame (Class of 2011)
- Wrestling Observer Newsletter awards
  - Rookies of the Year (1983)
  - Tag Team of the Year (1984)
  - Wrestling Observer Newsletter Hall of Fame (Class of 1996)

=== Hell Raisers ===
- New Japan Pro-Wrestling
  - IWGP Tag Team Championship (2 times)
- Pro Wrestling Illustrated
  - PWI ranked them #58 of the 100 best tag teams of the "PWI Years" in 2003

=== LOD 2005 ===
- World Wrestling Entertainment
  - WWE Tag Team Championship (1 time)

=== Hell Warriors ===
- Toryumon Mexico
  - UWA World Tag Team Championship (1 time)
