= Shusse Ōzumō =

1984 video game

- Arcade flyer
- Developer: Technōs Japan
- Publisher: SNK
- Platforms: Arcade, X68000
- Release: JP: June 1984
- Genre: Sumo
- Mode: Single-player

Shusse Ōzumō (Note: Japanese: 出世大相撲, Hepburn: Shusse Ōzumō) is a 1984 sumo video game developed by Technōs Japan and published by SNK for arcades. It was only released in Japan. It was also released for the X68000 with Mat Mania. It is the first video game to be based on sumo, leading the way for other similar titles. Hamster Corporation released the game as part of their Arcade Archives series for the PlayStation 4 in 2015 and Nintendo Switch in 2019.

== Gameplay ==
Players control a rikishi as he battles numerous other wrestlers with quirky personalities in order to become a Yokozuna. Players attack the computer-controlled enemy wrestler by hitting them, with the aim of pushing him out of the dohyo; to achieve this, players can grab the enemy to push or throw them out of the dohyo. This requires a meter to be filled by quickly pressing the action button, which when full for a period of time will guarantee success in using the move. A kiai system allows the meter to be filled much easier and requiring less intensive button presses for a short period of time; it can be refilled by attacking opponents.
