= I-Generation Superstars of Wrestling =

Superstars of Wrestling
- Promotion: i-Generation
- Date: July 30, 2000 aired in US December 1, 2000
- City: Sydney, New South Wales, Australia
- Venue: Sydney SuperDome
- Attendance: 10,000

Pay-per-view chronology
| ← Previous; First | Next → N/A |

i-Generation Wrestling Superstars of Wrestling was a small series of professional wrestling shows in 2000. The roster consisted of wrestlers who had previously achieved fame in other promotions. The tour promoted a World Championship, an Australasian Championship and a Tag Team Championship. i-Generation performed one tour of Australia. One event was filmed and broadcast as a pay-per-view event, later released on video. The show featured Dennis Rodman in the main event, and was advertised as Rodman Down Under. In 2011, the Bleacher Report ranked i-Generation Superstars of Wrestling at No.19 on its list of the 25 worst professional wrestling promotions in history.

== Superstars of Wrestling ==
Superstars of Wrestling was a pay-per-view event held by i-Generation. It took place on July 30, 2000 (and aired in the United States on December 1, 2000) from the Sydney SuperDome in Sydney, Australia. With the subtitle "Rodman Down Under", it was promoted largely for its main event which pitted the scientific veteran Curt Hennig against the controversial NBA star Dennis Rodman.

Vince Mancini and Ted DiBiase provided commentating for the event. Between each match, a female dance team known as the i-Generettes (similar to the Nitro Girls) performed at the entry way.

== Results ==
| No. | Results | Stipulations | Times |
|---|---|---|---|
| 1 | The Road Warriors (Hawk and Animal) defeated The Public Enemy (Rocco Rock and Johnny Grunge) (c) | Tables match for the i-Generation Tag Team Championship | 08:59 |
| 2 | The Barbarian defeated Brute Force | Hardcore match | 11:13 |
| 3 | Sweet Destiny (with Aussie Joe) defeated Brandi Wine (with Sugar Daddy) | Singles match | 10:27 |
| 4 | One Man Gang defeated Tatanka (c) | Singles match for the i-Generation Australasian Championship | 16:12 |
| 5 | Curt Hennig (c) defeated Dennis Rodman by disqualification. | Australian Outback match for the i-Generation World Heavyweight Championship | 08:46 |
(c) / – the champion(s) heading into the match

== Championships ==
=== i-Generation World Heavyweight Championship ===
| Wrestler: | Times: | Date: | Location: | Notes: |
|---|---|---|---|---|
| Curt Hennig | 1 | July 28, 2000 | Wollongong, New South Wales | Defeated Brute Force. |
| The Barbarian | 1 | August 2, 2000 | Newcastle, New South Wales | |
| Curt Hennig | 2 | August 3, 2000 | Perth, Western Australia | |

=== i-Generation Australasian Championship ===
| Wrestler: | Times: | Date: | Location: | Notes: |
|---|---|---|---|---|
| Tatanka | 1 | July 28, 2000 | Wollongong, New South Wales | Defeated One Man Gang. |
| One Man Gang | 1 | July 30, 2000 | Sydney, New South Wales | |
| Tatanka | 2 | August 3, 2000 | Perth, Western Australia | |
| One Man Gang | 2 | December 2, 2000 | Sydney, New South Wales | |

=== i-Generation Tag Team Championship ===
| Wrestler: | Times: | Date: | Location: | Notes: |
|---|---|---|---|---|
| The Road Warriors (Animal and Hawk) | 1 | July 28, 2000 | Wollongong, New South Wales | Defeated The Public Enemy. |
| The Public Enemy (Johnny Grunge and Rocco Rock) | 1 | July 29, 2000 | Brisbane, Queensland | |
| The Road Warriors | 2 | July 30, 2000 | Sydney, New South Wales | |
| The Public Enemy | 2 | August 3, 2000 | Perth, Western Australia | |
| The Road Warriors | 3 | December 2, 2000 | Sydney, New South Wales | |

== See also ==
- Professional wrestling in Australia
- List of professional wrestling organisations in Australia
  - World Championship Wrestling
  - World Wrestling All-Stars
