= WWF Royal Rumble (1993 video game) =

Professional wrestling game

- North American SNES cover art featuring Bret Hart, The Undertaker, Mr. Perfect, Yokozuna, Razor Ramon and Shawn Michaels.
- Developer: Sculptured Software
- Publisher: Acclaim Entertainment (Note: Released under the LJN brand on the SNES, and the Flying Edge brand on the Genesis.)
- Platforms: Sega Genesis; Super Nintendo Entertainment System
- Release: Super NES: NA: June 1993; EU: 1993; Genesis: NA/EU: November 1993
- Genre: Sports-based fighting
- Modes: Single-player, multiplayer

WWF Royal Rumble is a professional wrestling video game released in 1993 for the Super NES and Sega Genesis. Like its predecessor, WWF Super WrestleMania, it is based on the World Wrestling Federation (WWF). It features a variety of match types, including the newly added Royal Rumble match. The game's roster consists of wrestlers who were top stars in the WWF at the time, and each version of the game has five exclusive playable characters.

The game boasts several new features, including an on-screen meter grappling meter and steel chairs that can be used as weapons. Royal Rumble also adds a variety of new moves, including illegal tactics such as choking and each wrestler's signature finishing moves.

The game was followed up with the Sega CD release WWF Rage in the Cage and a direct sequel, WWF Raw.

== Gameplay ==
WWF Royal Rumble carries over the "tug-of-war" style grappling system from the previous game, this time adding an on-screen meter to show who has the advantage in a grapple and how close they are to executing a move. Players may strike their opponent with steel chairs found outside the ring. After knocking the referee temporarily unconscious, one may use illegal tactics such as choking and eye raking. To better avoid losing via count out, wrestlers may also roll into the ring from the bottom side; ring entry was previously only possible through the left and right sides. In addition adding more moves to the basic moveset (including the body splash, knee drop, backbreaker, and atomic drop), WWF Royal Rumble includes signature finishing moves for each wrestler.

=== Match types ===
Royal Rumble match (SNES version)

In a One-on-One match, two wrestlers (one player versus the computer or two players) square off for a face-to-face bout. One Fall, Brawl, and Tournament variations are available. One Fall matches feature an in-ring referee and are contested under standard rules. Victory is achieved by a 3-count pinfall or a count-out if a wrestler stays outside of the ring for a full 10 count. In a Brawl, however, the referee is absent. This allows unlimited time outside the ring and illegal moves such as eye raking and choking are allowed at all times. The Brawl match does not require a pinfall to win; instead, the first player to be entirely drained of his stamina submits in defeat. In a Tournament, a player must battle through the entire roster in a series of One Fall matches to win the championship belt.

A Tag Team match is made up of two teams of two wrestlers (if two players are involved, they can choose to either control opposite teams or be on the same team against the computer). Whenever one wrestler gets tired, they can tag in their partner. A wrestler on the apron can grab an opponent if they get close to the ropes, allowing their partner to attack them. One Fall, Brawl, and Tournament configurations are available. The same rules for the singles One Fall and Brawl matches apply to tag team matches. In the tag team Tournament mode, either one player or two cooperative players will choose two wrestlers to form a team and then must defeat the remaining wrestlers in a series of One Fall tag team matches to win the tag team championship.

A Triple Tag Team match is similar to a Tag Team match, except instead of two wrestlers to a team, there are three wrestlers on each team. Only one partner for each team appears on the apron at a time. The player can switch outside partners by pressing a button. One Fall and Brawl options are available (with one player or two players head-to-head), with the same rules as singles and tag team matches.

The Royal Rumble begins with two wrestlers, and more adversaries enter until six wrestlers are in the ring. Additional wrestlers enter as others are eliminated. There are no holds barred, and elimination occurs when a wrestler is thrown out of the ring. A wrestler must be worn down before they can be thrown out, unless they're caught running with a hip toss or knocked off of the top turnbuckle. The last wrestler remaining in the ring after all twelve have entered wins the match. At the end of a Royal Rumble, score rankings are shown giving a wrestler's total time in the ring along with a list of opponents they eliminated.

== Roster differences ==
The SNES and Genesis versions were released three months apart, with each version having several exclusive wrestlers. The two versions share seven wrestlers: Bret Hart, The Undertaker, Shawn Michaels, Razor Ramon, Randy Savage, Crush, and "The Narcissist" Lex Luger. The five remaining members of the roster differ between versions. The SNES version features Ric Flair (who had left the WWF back in February to return to World Championship Wrestling (WCW)), Mr. Perfect, Ted DiBiase, Yokozuna, and Tatanka. The Genesis version replaces them with Hulk Hogan, IRS, "Hacksaw" Jim Duggan, "The Model" Rick Martel and Papa Shango.

== Reception ==
Reception

Review scores
Publication	Score	
Publication	Sega Genesis	SNES
GameFan		86% (Note: In GameFan's review, two critics scored the SNES version 85%, one 84%, and another 89%.)
Hyper	84%	84%
Official Nintendo Magazine		82/100
Nintendo Magazine Magazine (Australia)		82/100
Super Control		70%

In North America, the Genesis version sold 330,018 units and grossed $20,181,870 while the SNES version sold 325,008 units and grossed $24,875,612, for a total of 655,026 units sold and $45,057,482 revenue.

The game received generally favorable reviews from critics. Official Nintendo Magazine gave the game a score of 82 out of 100. Hyper gave both the Super Nintendo Entertainment System and Sega Genesis versions an 84% score. Mega placed the game at #40 in their Top Mega Drive Games of All Time.

== See also ==
- List of licensed wrestling video games
- List of fighting games
