= Legends of Wrestling =

2001 video game

- North American and PAL cover art for PlayStation 2. Clockwise, from top left: Rob Van Dam, Bret Hart, Hulk Hogan, Terry Funk, Jimmy Snuka, Jerry Lawler, The Road Warriors, and Jimmy Hart.
- Developer: Acclaim Studios Salt Lake City
- Publisher: Acclaim Entertainment
- Composer: Nelson Everhart
- Series: Legends of Wrestling
- Platforms: PlayStation 2; GameCube; Xbox
- Release: PlayStation 2: NA: December 3, 2001; PAL: February 15, 2002; GameCube & Xbox: NA: May 28, 2002; PAL: June 7, 2002
- Genre: Sports
- Modes: Single-player, multiplayer

Legends of Wrestling is a professional wrestling video game developed and published by Acclaim. It was released in 2001 for the PlayStation 2, then in 2002 for the GameCube and Xbox.

== Reception ==
Reception

Aggregate score
Aggregator	Score		
Aggregator	GameCube	PS2	Xbox
Metacritic	50/100	55/100	65/100

Review scores
Publication	Score		
Publication	GameCube	PS2	Xbox
AllGame	N/A	2/5	N/A
Electronic Gaming Monthly	N/A	7.17/10	N/A
Game Informer	7/10	6.25/10	7/10
GamePro	N/A	2/5	N/A
GameRevolution	N/A	C	N/A
GameSpot	5.3/10	5.3/10	5.3/10
GameSpy	2.5/5 (62%)	70%	72%
GameZone	7/10	7/10	7.5/10
IGN	5.4/10	4.9/10	7/10
Nintendo Power	2.6/5	N/A	N/A
Official U.S. PlayStation Magazine	N/A	2.5/5	N/A
BBC Sport	N/A	56%	N/A
The Cincinnati Enquirer	N/A	4/5	N/A

The game was met with "mixed or average" reviews, according to review aggregator Metacritic.

The Cincinnati Enquirer gave the PS2 version a score of four stars out of five and said that its characters "have an exaggerated action-figure look, but they move smoothly and have a robust collection of moves." However, Playboy gave the same version a score of 60% and said, "Unless you're desperate to see Captain Lou Albano in action again (and who isn't?), scant reason for a purchase presents itself. Casual wrestling fans can pass." BBC Sport gave said version a score of 56%, stating: "When you press a button to pull off a move there's far too long a wait for any action, and the game actually builds up a queue which can mean you are waiting for moves to happen before you can continue."

== Sequels ==
A sequel to the game, titled Legends of Wrestling II, was released in 2002 for the Game Boy Advance, PlayStation 2, GameCube and Xbox. The series was followed by a third sequel, titled Showdown: Legends of Wrestling, was released in 2004, for the PlayStation 2 and Xbox.

== See also ==
- List of licensed wrestling video games
- List of fighting games
- Legends of Wrestling (series)
- Legends of Wrestling II
- Showdown: Legends of Wrestling
