= Jon Heidenreich =

American professional wrestler and football player

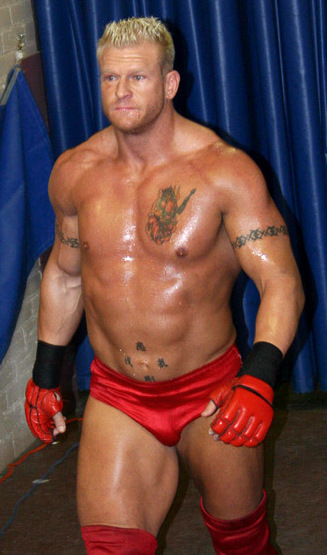
- Heidenreich in 2005

Personal information
- Born: June 28, 1969 (age 57) New Orleans, Louisiana, U.S.
- Children: 2

Professional wrestling career
- Ring names: Big Bad Jon; Heidenreich; Jon Heidenreich
- Billed height: 6 ft 7 in (201 cm)
- Billed weight: 285 lb (129 kg)
- Billed from: New Orleans, Louisiana
- Trained by: Ultimate Pro Wrestling; Tom Howard; Nightmare Danny Davis; Nick Dinsmore
- Debut: 2001
- Retired: February 24, 2018
- Football career

No. 65, 74
- Position: Offensive lineman

Personal information
- Listed height: 6 ft 5 in (1.96 m)
- Listed weight: 285 lb (129 kg)

Career information
- High school: Brother Martin (New Orleans, Louisiana)
- College: Mississippi State; Northeast Louisiana
- NFL draft: 1992: undrafted

Career history
- Washington Redskins (1992)*; New Orleans Saints (1993)*; Atlanta Falcons (1994)*; Shreveport Pirates (1994–1995); Texas Terror (1996); Frankfurt Galaxy (1997)
- * Offseason or practice squad member only

Jon Heidenreich (born June 28, 1969) is an American retired professional wrestler, better known mononymously as Heidenreich. He is best known for his tenure in World Wrestling Entertainment (WWE) on its SmackDown brand where he was a one time WWE Tag Team Champion with Road Warrior Animal as a part of the 2005 version of the Legion of Doom.

== American football career ==
Prior to professional wrestling, Heidenreich played American football and was invited to training camp prior to the 1992 season by the defending Super Bowl XXVI Champion Washington Redskins (Washington Commanders) as an undrafted rookie offensive tackle out of Northeast Louisiana University, which later became University of Louisiana at Monroe in 1999. Heidenreich was among the first round of roster cuts by head coach Joe Gibbs on July 27, 1992.

One week before training camp began in July 1993, Heidenreich signed with the New Orleans Saints and outspoken head coach Jim E. Mora. Mora had liked what he saw in Heidenreich during a late-June tryout to fill a training camp roster spot while standout offensive lineman Jim Dombrowski held out until signing a five-year contract worth $11.25 million on August 13, one week before training camp ended. On the first day of camp, Heidenreich (wearing jersey #65) was involved in a fight with teammate and Saints defensive lineman Rick Dolly in the morning session. In the afternoon session, Heidenreich was involved in another skirmish when he grabbed Saints outside linebacker and 1990 first-round draft pick Renaldo Turnbull from behind and threw him to the ground after Turnbull had just beaten him on a move to the outside. Heidenreich was cut on August 24, 1993, the final day of roster cuts to meet the mandatory 60-player requirement.

In July 1994, Heidenreich was invited to training camp by first-year Atlanta Falcons head coach June Jones. This time Heidenreich wore jersey #74 and was often tasked with blocking fellow WWE wrestler Bill Goldberg, who played defensive tackle for the Falcons from 1992 to 1994. Heidenreich was again denied a final roster spot when the Falcons cut him on the final day of roster cuts on August 23, 1994.

He played as an offensive lineman for two seasons (1994 and 1995) in the Canadian Football League for the Shreveport Pirates before playing for the Texas Terror of the Arena Football League (AFL) in 1996 and the Frankfurt Galaxy of NFL Europa in 1997.

== Professional wrestling career ==
=== Early career (2001–2003) ===
Heidenreich began training at California-based Ultimate Pro Wrestling before he was first signed to a World Wrestling Federation developmental contract in 2001 after he impressed Bruce Prichard. He lost to Perry Saturn in a dark match on December 18, 2001 for Sunday Night Heat. Worked in WWF's developmental territory Ohio Valley Wrestling. After being released from the WWF, he wrestled in Japan's Pro Wrestling ZERO1-MAX promotion, where he won the NWA Intercontinental Tag Team Championship with Nathan Jones and impressed WWE scouts, who re-signed him in 2003.

=== World Wrestling Entertainment (2003–2006) ===
==== Early years (2003–2004) ====
Heidenreich made his return to the now-renamed World Wrestling Entertainment (WWE) on the September 29, 2003, episode of Raw, making his formal debut with a gimmick being "controlled" by an entity known as "Little Johnny". After weeks of trying to secure a tryout match, he was finally granted one on the October 27 episode of Raw, teaming with The Hurricane to defeat La Resistance. On the November 3 episode of Raw, he teamed with Trish Stratus to defeat Victoria and Stevie Richards. Over the next month, Heidenreich remained undefeated, before his streak was snapped by Rico on the December 14 edition of Sunday Night Heat before Armageddon. On the February 8, 2004, episode of Heat, Heidenreich was defeated by Rob Van Dam. After wrestling a few more times, Heidenreich disappeared from WWE television around May 2004.

In an interview with ThePainClinic.net in 2007, Heidenreich revealed that "Little Johnny" was actually meant to be a small doll that represented his inner child who was still angry at being born in a charity hospital. He stated that he used the character in OVW and brought the doll out to the ring with him in the same vein as Al Snow used to bring out the styrofoam head. According to Heidenreich, the angle was supposedly inspired by his own childhood where he spoke to a doll himself at one point.

In 2008, former WWE writer Dan Madigan revealed that in 2004 he had pitched directly to Vince McMahon an idea to have Heidenreich return as a Nazi stormtrooper named Baron Von Bava, who had been cryogenically frozen before being revived by Paul Heyman (a Jewish son of a Holocaust survivor), complete with Heidenreich wearing the red armband with the swastika and even goose-stepping to the ring. While WWE would eventually have Heyman manage Heidenreich, the pitch was considered so shocking that McMahon left the board room speechless and did not return for the rest of the day. The pitch led to Madigan leaving WWE later that year.

==== Feud with The Undertaker (2004–2005) ====
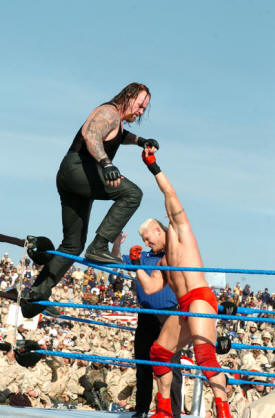
Heidenreich and Undertaker competing at Tribute to the Troops in 2004

He returned on the August 26, 2004, episode of SmackDown! as a heel under the management of Paul Heyman. His new gimmick was as a psychopath: running in during random matches, attacking fans, and reciting hateful poetry, which he referred to as "Disasterpieces." On the September 16 episode of SmackDown!, he attacked commentator Michael Cole and dragged him backstage and "raped" him. In a 2008 interview, Heidenreich explained that the Cole rape angle was McMahon's idea, and that Pulp Fiction came to mind when Stephanie McMahon approached him with the idea.

His first feud came against The Undertaker, and began after Heidenreich ran in during The Undertaker's WWE Championship match against John "Bradshaw" Layfield (JBL) at No Mercy. The Undertaker beat Heidenreich at the next month's Survivor Series, but again Heidenreich cost him a WWE Championship match at December's Armageddon when he interfered in the main event fatal four-way match. At WWE Tribute to the Troops on December 23, Heidenreich lost to The Undertaker via countout. On the January 6, 2005, episode of SmackDown!, Heidenreich and Heyman lost to The Undertaker in a 2-on-1 handicap match, after Heyman was pinned. After the match, Heyman was placed in a casket by The Undertaker, writing him off television. At Royal Rumble on January 30, he faced The Undertaker in a casket match. Midway through the match, Snitsky from the Raw brand interfered on Heidenreich's behalf. However, after opening the casket, it was revealed that Kane was hidden in the casket, who pounced on both Snitsky and Heidenreich; they continued their fight in the crowd, while Heidenreich lost the match. This started a chain reaction of feuds, originally planned to lead to a match at WrestleMania 21 in which The Undertaker would partner with Kane to take on Snitsky and Heidenreich. This idea was later nixed; The Undertaker instead fought Randy Orton and Kane was placed into the Money in the Bank ladder match. In 2026, Heidenreich claimed his Survivor Series match against Undertaker was his favourite match of his career.

==== Teaming with Animal (2005–2006) ====
At No Way Out, Heidenreich lost to Booker T by disqualification after hitting Booker T with a steel chair. After a series of matches against Booker, Heidenreich turned face. His "disasterpieces" became more light-hearted and began receiving cheers from the crowd. Heidenreich was then given a segment on SmackDown! in which he "made friends" with audience members, read them a piece of his poetry, and had them stand in his corner during his match. During this time he had a brief feud with Orlando Jordan, unsuccessfully challenging him for the United States Championship at Judgment Day.

In July 2005, Heidenreich was paired with the returning Road Warrior Animal, reviving the Legion of Doom and defeated MNM at Great American Bash, winning the WWE Tag Team Championship. As part of the reformed Legion of Doom, Heidenreich shaved his hair into a mohawk and began to wear face paint and the Road Warrior spikes. On the October 28 episode of SmackDown!, the Road Warriors lost the WWE Tag Team Championship back to MNM in a Fatal 4-Way also involving Paul Burchill and William Regal and The Mexicools (Super Crazy and Psicosis). Heidenreich wrestled his final match, teaming up with Animal to defeat Nunzio and Vito, on the December 30 edition of Velocity and was released on January 17, 2006.

=== World Wrestling Council (2006–2007) ===
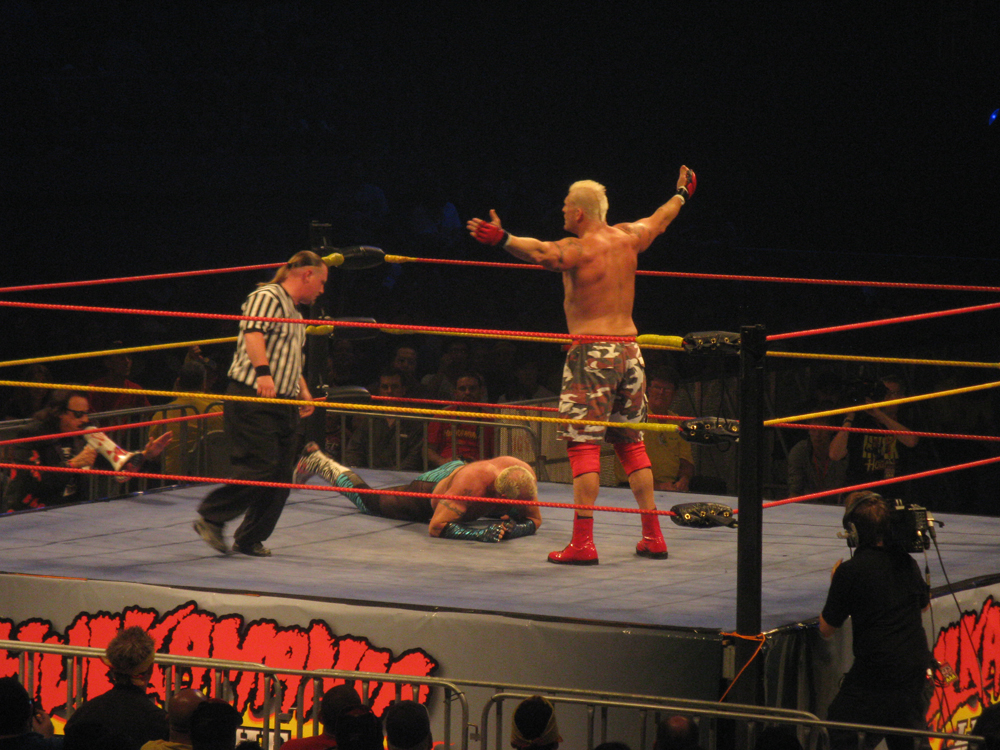
Heidenreich after defeating Brutus Beefcake during the Hulkamania Tour in 2009.

After his run in the WWE, Heidenreich moved on to World Wrestling Council, where he defeated Abbad on October 28, 2006, to win the WWC Universal Heavyweight Championship, the top title in the Puerto Rico based promotion. Two months later he lost the title to Carlito at the Lockout event. However, he was given the title back when Carlito was stripped of the title due to Carlito's contractual compromises with World Wrestling Entertainment. He lost the title a second time to Eddie Colón, Carlito's brother, on January 6, 2007.

=== Independent circuit (2007–2009, 2016–2018) ===
After leaving the WWE, Heidenreich made his debut in All-American Wrestling, a Louisiana-based promotion on May 19, 2007, where he defeated J.T. Lamotta. On May 18, 2008, he teamed with Rodney Mack to defeat Latinos Locos for the promotion's Tag Team Championship. However, the title was vacated soon afterwards due to interference in the original title match. On December 14, Heidenreich won the promotion's Heavyweight Championship in a three way Loser Leaves AAW match involving then-champion The Angel of Sinn and Haniel, in which he pinned Angel to win the title. He retired from professional wrestling soon after.

Heidenreich wrestled several matches in 2016, including for New York-based promotion Warriors of Wrestling on June 11, 2016, against Juba. The match ended in a double disqualification. He faced off against a Doink the Clown impersonator at an event in a Golden Corral parking lot in May 2016, with the bizarre encounter gaining the attention of WrestleCrap.

On November 12, 2017, Heidenreich won the 302 Wrestling Heavyweight Championship; however the title was immediately retired after his win.

== Other media ==
Heidenreich participated in the wrestling film, Bloodstained Memoirs. He also appears as a playable character in WWE Day of Reckoning 2 and WWE SmackDown! vs. Raw 2006.

== Personal life ==
Heidenreich is married and has two children. In 2005, his home was damaged by Hurricane Katrina.

In July 2016, Heidenreich was named part of a class action lawsuit filed against WWE which alleged that wrestlers incurred traumatic brain injuries during their tenure and that the company concealed the risks of injury. The suit was litigated by attorney Konstantine Kyros, who has been involved in a number of other lawsuits against WWE. The lawsuit was dismissed by US District Judge Vanessa Lynne Bryant in September 2018.

Since leaving WWE, Heidenreich has resided in New Orleans and in February 2026 was reported to be working at a Wal-Mart store.

== Championships and accomplishments ==
=== Professional wrestling ===
- 302 Wrestling
  - 302 Heavyweight Championship (1 time)
- All American Wrestling (Louisiana)
  - AAW Heavyweight Championship (1 time)
  - AAW Tag Team Championship (1 time) – with Rodney Mack
- American Wrestling Rampage
  - AWR No Limits Championship (1 time)
- Bluegrass Championship Wrestling
  - BCW World Heavyweight Championship (1 time)
- No Limit Wrestling
  - NLW Heavyweight Championship (1 time)
- Over The Top Wrestling
  - OTT No Limits Championship (1 time)
- Pro Wrestling ZERO1-MAX
  - NWA Intercontinental Tag Team Championship (1 time) – with Nathan Jones
- Texas Wrestling Alliance
  - TWA Tag Team Championship (1 time) – with Busta
- World Wrestling Council
  - WWC Universal Heavyweight Championship (2 times)
- World Wrestling Entertainment
  - WWE Tag Team Championship (1 time) – with Road Warrior Animal

== See also ==
- List of gridiron football players who became professional wrestlers
