= WWF Super WrestleMania =

1992 video game

- North American SNES box art featuring (clockwise from top left): The Legion of Doom, Sid Justice, Hulk Hogan, Jake "The Snake" Roberts and "Macho Man" Randy Savage.
- Developer: Sculptured Software
- Publisher: Acclaim Entertainment (Note: Released under the LJN brand name on the SNES, and the Flying Edge brand name on the Genesis.)
- Platforms: Sega Genesis, Super NES
- Release: Genesis: NA: November 1992; EU: November 26, 1992; Super NES: NA: March 1992; EU: November 22, 1992
- Genres: Sports-based fighting
- Modes: Single-player, multiplayer

WWF Super WrestleMania is a multiplatform wrestling video game based on the World Wrestling Federation (WWF), released in 1992 for the Super Nintendo Entertainment System and the Sega Genesis.

Two other 16-bit WWF games, WWF Royal Rumble and WWF Raw, were released which retained the "tug-of-war" style grappling system, where moves are performed by locking up and out-tapping the other player or the computer to execute a move.

== Gameplay ==
All wrestlers share the same set of standard professional wrestling moves like scoop slams, suplexes, dropkicks, clotheslines, hip tosses, and elbow drops. The Genesis version also has signature moves for each wrestler which can be performed at any time in the match. Gameplay modes consist of one-on-one, tag team, and four-on-four Survivor Series elimination matches. The Genesis version also contains a WWF Championship mode where the player selects one wrestler and must defeat the rest in a series of one-on-one matches to be crowned WWF Champion.

While the Super NES version does not contain signature moves, its roster is a bit larger, with ten wrestlers compared to eight in the Genesis version. The only wrestlers shared between versions are Hulk Hogan, Randy Savage and Ted DiBiase. Wrestlers exclusive to the Super NES version are Jake Roberts, The Undertaker, Sid Justice, The Legion of Doom and The Natural Disasters. Wrestlers exclusive to the Genesis version are Ultimate Warrior, Papa Shango, Irwin R. Schyster, The British Bulldog, and Shawn Michaels.

== Reception ==
Reception

Review scores
Publication	Score	
Publication	Sega Genesis	SNES
Aktueller Software Markt	8/12	9/12
Computer and Video Games		90/100
Game Players		7/10
GameFan	160/200	
GamePro	13.5/20	17/25
GameZone		90/100
Joystick		90%
Mean Machines Sega	80/100	
Nintendo Power		14.2/20
Player One	80%	
Video Games (DE)	70%	78%
VideoGames & Computer Entertainment		8/10
Zero		90/100
N-Force		90%
Super Pro		76/100

In North America, the SNES version sold 322,176 units and grossed $24,658,855 while the Genesis version sold 244,752 units and grossed $12,331,735, for a total of 566,928 units sold and $36,990,590 revenue.

The game received generally favorable reviews from critics. Germany's Aktueller Software Markt magazine awarded a "satisfactory" rating to the Mega Drive/Genesis version and a "good" rating to the SNES version. Computer and Video Games magazine called it "the best two-player game anywhere" and particularly praised its multiplayer capabilities. The Game Players Nintendo Guide described it as "a solid wrestling game that could have been one of the best ever if not for some substantial drawbacks. You'll have the most fun playing against a friend; re-creating those famous WWF rivalries definitely makes you anxious to fight just one more match". GameFan had a mostly positive opinion of the Genesis version, praising the gameplay, controls and graphics. The French Joystick magazine called it the best simulation of this sport on both consoles. Mean Machines Sega called it "a fun wrestle game (the best on the Megadrive so far) which could have been supported with a bit more front end". GamePro gave the Sega Genesis version a 13.5 out of 20, while they gave the Super Nintendo Entertainment System version a 17 out of 25.

== See also ==
- List of licensed wrestling video games
- List of fighting games
