= Legends of Wrestling (series) =

- Genre: Sports
- Developers: Acclaim Studios Salt Lake City; Acclaim Studios Austin; Powerhead Games (GBA)
- Publisher: Acclaim Entertainment
- Creator: Acclaim Entertainment
- Platforms: PlayStation 2; GameCube; Xbox; Game Boy Advance
- First release: Legends of Wrestling; December 3, 2001
- Latest release: Showdown: Legends of Wrestling; June 24, 2004

Legends of Wrestling is a series of professional wrestling video games developed and published by Acclaim. The first title in the series was released in 2001 for the PlayStation 2, then in 2002 for the GameCube and Xbox. In 2006, Canadian game publisher Throwback Entertainment acquired the license and publishing rights to Legends of Wrestling.

== Legends of Wrestling ==
Legends of Wrestling was released on the PlayStation 2 on December 3, 2001, and on the Xbox and GameCube on May 27, 2002. It contains over 40 of the biggest names in pro wrestling.

== Legends of Wrestling II ==
Legends of Wrestling II is the sequel to the professional wrestling video game Legends of Wrestling. It was published by Acclaim Entertainment and released on November 26, 2002 for both the PlayStation 2 and GameCube. It was later released for the Xbox on December 5, 2002. Legends II contains 25 new wrestlers, though also excludes Rob Van Dam, presumably because he had recently been signed to a WWF contract following the recent end and buyout of ECW. However, the game did contain Eddie Guerrero, who, although unemployed at the time he signed a likeness deal, re-signed with WWF when the game was released.

The PlayStation 2 and Xbox versions included video interviews with many of the legends featured in the game while the European version of the game included four additional exclusive legends from the United Kingdom: Kendo Nagasaki, Big Daddy, Mick McManus, and Giant Haystacks.

== Showdown: Legends of Wrestling ==
Showdown: Legends of Wrestling is the third installment of the Legends of Wrestling video game series. It was published by Acclaim Entertainment for the PlayStation 2 and Xbox. It was released in June 2004. The game features nine new legends. A version of the game for the GameCube, as well as a PC port of the game, was also planned but was cancelled.

== Rosters ==
All Legends of Wrestling games feature character rosters filled with wrestlers of the past. Several characters appear in all three games so far produced, whereas others only make an appearance in one or two. Legends of Wrestling II also features fictional characters that the player can compete against but not use themselves.

== Reception ==
| Game | Platform | MC |
|---|---|---|
| Legends of Wrestling | PlayStation 2; GameCube; Xbox | 55/100 (PS2); 50/100 (NGC); 65/100 (Xbox) |
| Legends of Wrestling II | PlayStation 2; GameCube; Xbox; Game Boy Advance | 59/100 (PS2); 59/100 (NGC); 62/100 (Xbox); 24/100 (GBA) |
| Showdown: Legends of Wrestling | PlayStation 2; Xbox | 55/100 (PS2); 57/100 (Xbox) |

The Legends of Wrestling series has received mixed to average reviews from critics ever since the release of the first game.

== See also ==
- List of licensed wrestling video games
- List of fighting games
- WWE Legends of Wrestlemania
