= Professional wrestling moves =

Professional wrestling moves can refer to several types of moves used against opponents in professional wrestling, including:

- Professional wrestling aerial techniques
- Professional wrestling double-team maneuvers
- Professional wrestling holds
- Professional wrestling strikes
- Professional wrestling throws
- Pin (professional wrestling)
