= Legends of Wrestling II =

2002 video game

- North American PlayStation 2 cover art featuring (clockwise from left) Hulk Hogan, Bruno Sammartino, André the Giant, Rowdy Roddy Piper, Sid Vicious, Scott Steiner, Bret "Hitman" Hart, and Jerry "The King" Lawler
- Developers: Acclaim Studios Salt Lake City; Powerhead Games (GBA)
- Publisher: Acclaim Entertainment
- Series: Legends of Wrestling
- Platforms: Game Boy Advance; PlayStation 2; GameCube; Xbox
- Release: Game Boy Advance: NA: November 26, 2002; PAL: December 6, 2002; PlayStation 2 & GameCube: NA: November 26, 2002; PAL: February 7, 2003; Xbox: NA: December 5, 2002; PAL: February 7, 2003
- Genre: Sports
- Modes: Single-player, multiplayer

Legends of Wrestling II is a professional wrestling video game developed by Acclaim Studios Salt Lake City, published by Acclaim Entertainment, and released on November 26, 2002, for both the PlayStation 2 and GameCube. It was later released for the Xbox on December 5, 2002. It is the sequel to the 2001 professional wrestling video game Legends of Wrestling. Legends II contains 25 wrestlers that were not in the first game, though also excludes Rob Van Dam, presumably because he had recently been signed to a WWE contract. The game does contain Eddie Guerrero who, although unemployed at the time, re-signed with WWE by the time the game was released. A Game Boy Advance version of the game was released on November 25, 2002. It was the last game developed by Acclaim's Salt Lake City studio before its closure in December 2002.

The PlayStation 2 and Xbox versions included video interviews with many of the legends featured in the game while the European version of the game includes four exclusive additional legends from the United Kingdom: Kendo Nagasaki, Big Daddy, Mick McManus, and Giant Haystacks.

Whilst the console version received generally mixed reviews, the Game Boy Advance version of the game received universally negative reviews, being noted as one of the worst games to release on the system.

== Gameplay ==
Within Career Mode, a wrestler will be working for a specific promoter in each area. By winning the belt for that division and successfully defending it, said promoter will become available for purchase in Shop Mode. Note that the world region is only available after completion of all the American territories. Each territory has 8–12 storylines chosen at random. Certain storylines may not be available based on the wrestler used by the player. For example, if the player uses Jerry Lawler, the only storyline he can play in the Southeast region is based on the famous feud Lawler had with comedian Andy Kaufman.

The game also features a Create-a-Legend mode (CAL). Players can create their own custom made characters which can be used for storyline mode as well as exhibition play.

== Reception ==
Reception

Aggregate score
Aggregator	Score			
Aggregator	GBA	GameCube	PS2	Xbox
Metacritic	24/100	59/100	59/100	62/100

Review scores
Publication	Score			
Publication	GBA	GameCube	PS2	Xbox
AllGame	1/5	N/A	N/A	N/A
Electronic Gaming Monthly	N/A	6/10	N/A	N/A
Eurogamer	N/A	N/A	5/10	N/A
Game Informer	0.75/10	6.75/10	7/10	6.75/10
GameSpot	2.4/10	6/10	6/10	6.2/10
GameSpy	1/5	2/5	2/5	2/5
GameZone	3.5/10	6.9/10	6.7/10	6.5/10
IGN	2/10	6.9/10	6.9/10	6.8/10
Nintendo Power	2.6/5	2.9/5	N/A	N/A
Official U.S. PlayStation Magazine	N/A	N/A	3/5	N/A
Official Xbox Magazine (US)	N/A	N/A	N/A	6.5/10

The console versions of the game received "mixed or average" reviews, while the Game Boy Advance version received "generally unfavorable" reviews, according to review aggregator Metacritic. Notably, it is the lowest rated Game Boy Advance game on the website.

GameSpot nominated Legends of Wrestling II for its 2002 "Worst Game on Game Boy Advance" award, which went to Mortal Kombat Advance.

== Sequel ==
A sequel to the game, titled Showdown: Legends of Wrestling, was released two years later in 2004, for the PlayStation 2 and Xbox.

== See also ==
- List of licensed wrestling video games
- List of fighting games
- Legends of Wrestling (series)
- Legends of Wrestling
- Showdown: Legends of Wrestling
