= WWE Legends of WrestleMania =

2009 video game

- Cover art featuring various wrestlers.
- Developer: Yuke's
- Publisher: THQ
- Directors: Taku Chihaya; George K Ito
- Producer: Hiromi Furuta
- Designers: Naoto Ueno; Jonny Suzuki
- Artists: Yoshio Togiya; Makio Yamanaka
- Platforms: PlayStation 3; Xbox 360; iOS
- Release: PlayStation 3 & Xbox 360: AU: 19 March 2009; EU: 20 March 2009; NA: 24 March 2009; JP: 9 July 2009; iOS: WW: 21 September 2009
- Genre: Sports
- Modes: Single-player, multiplayer

WWE Legends of WrestleMania is a professional wrestling video game featuring legends of the professional wrestling promotion, World Wrestling Entertainment (WWE), who have appeared at WrestleManias 1 to XV in the 1980s and 1990s; during that time, WWE was known as the World Wrestling Federation (WWF). The game was released for the PlayStation 3 and Xbox 360 in March 2009 to coincide with WrestleMania 25. The game was developed by Yuke's and published by THQ, the same developer and publisher for the WWE SmackDown vs. Raw video game series. The retro WWE logo featured in the game was a slight modification of the 1980s and early 1990s WWF logo to match the letter design of the current logo. Unlike all other WWE Smackdown vs. Raw games released, this game was not ported over to the PlayStation 2 or Wii.

== Gameplay ==
=== Match gameplay ===
A recreation of the main event at WrestleMania 3 featuring Andre (left) and Hogan (right).

The game features a new grapple-based combo fighting system. To differentiate itself from the SmackDown series, Legends of WrestleMania focuses more on arcade-style gameplay (similar to WWF WrestleFest) with only the D-pad (or left analog stick) and the four face buttons needed on the gamepad. During play, the player's HUD features a health bar and a number between one and three. After successful chains of attacks, the number increases with more devastating moves now available. After completing the third level of moves, the wrestler's finishing move can then be performed. Continuous chains of moves are performed by pressing a button allocated by the screen before the player's opponent can. If the opponent beats the player at this, then the move is blocked and the chain is broken. Each wrestler has five taunts, which will either increase his health meter or his speed, among others. In addition, when a wrestler is being pinned, a meter displays that determines how likely it is for the opponent to kick out of the pin. Unlike the WWE SmackDown games, a submission meter is the only indication to specific damaged body parts, as opposed to a body model located in the HUD.

Managers play a significant part of the game, and interfere on behalf of their clients. Four such managers appear in the game: Bobby Heenan, Jimmy Hart, Mr. Fuji, and Paul Bearer. Features similar to the SmackDown series such as create-a-legend mode and online gameplay are also featured in the game. There are many new moves created for this game, along with most moves that appeared in Smackdown vs. Raw 2009. Most moves were used for SvR 2010. A new mode featured is the WrestleMania Tour where classic WrestleMania matches can be recreated with classic WWE footage included to introduce the bout. The game also includes a feature to import the full playable roster from SvR 09 (excluding Big Daddy V, Chuck Palumbo, Elijah Burke, Lance Cade, Paul London, Trevor Murdoch, the Masked Man, Tony, and Divas).

=== Game modes ===
The game features a WrestleMania Tour mode consisting of three options: Relive, Rewrite, and Redefine. In Relive, the player can play as a legend that won a match over a certain wrestler to recreate WrestleMania moments. Rewrite allows the player to play as the loser of a certain historic match in order to "rewrite" history as an alternate fictional "what-if" scenario. The player in this mode can watch a recap of the history of certain wrestlers, a recap of their feud, and a recap of their match at WrestleMania. In this mode, the player must complete certain objectives, besides winning the match. In Redefine, the player chooses any wrestler to play and the ability to change the match type to create alternate fictional "what-if" scenarios. A Movie Theater is available to watch all unlocked match clips. The match types are Single, Tag Team, Triple Threat, Steel Cage, Ladder, Submission, Iron Man, Handicap, Hell in a Cell, and Royal Rumble. Another game mode is the Legend Killer mode. The mode features six tiers, with four tiers having ten legends waiting to challenge the player, and the two others will have all the Legends from the game and a tier list for the Superstars from SvR 09 respectively. This mode is used to enhance the player's Create-a-Legend attributes. Also featured is a Hall of Fame Mode, allowing players to view what they have unlocked.

== Roster ==
The game features 38 playable characters by default, and 4 non-playable managers, while match commentary is provided by Jim Ross and Jerry Lawler. Players could extend the roster by choosing the "Import WWE SmackDown vs. Raw 2009" option on the main menu. This would import most of the male characters from SvR 09 into the game. Unlockable characters would only be available if they had been previously unlocked in SvR 09, but female and downloadable content characters could not be imported. Each imported character had a unique moves set designed specifically for the WWE Legends of WrestleMania game. These moves sets became available automatically in "Create-A-Moves-Set" mode. This function required SvR 09 to be loaded onto the console's internal memory, but once imported, the characters remained permanently unlocked in WWE Legends of WrestleMania. Players did not need to retain the SvR 09 game files on the internal memory in order to retain the characters. Big Daddy V, Chuck Palumbo, Elijah Burke, Hornswoggle, Lance Cade, Masked Man, Paul London, Tony, Trevor Murdoch, Divas, and all the DLC characters could not be imported.

Players could also create their own custom characters in "Create-A-WWE-Legend" mode. Alternatively, they could also import user-created characters from SvR 09 save files. If the "Import WWE SmackDown vs. Raw 2009" function had been used, it made most entrance animations, videos and theme music from this edition available in the "Create-An-Entrance" modes.

== Arenas ==
The game features the arenas used from WrestleMania I to XV, as well as a Royal Rumble arena based on the 1995 Royal Rumble.

== Reception ==
Reception

Aggregate score
Aggregator	Score	
Aggregator	PS3	Xbox 360
Metacritic	70/100	71/100

Review scores
Publication	Score	
Publication	PS3	Xbox 360
Eurogamer	N/A	6/10
Game Informer	8.5/10	8.5/10
GamePro	4/5	4/5
GameRevolution	B	B
GameSpot	5/10	5/10
GameSpy	2.5/5	2.5/5
GameZone	8.2/10	7/10
Giant Bomb	3/5	3/5
IGN	6.5/10	6.5/10
Official Xbox Magazine (US)	N/A	8.5/10
PlayStation: The Official Magazine	3.5/5	N/A

WWE Legends of WrestleMania received "mixed or average" reviews according to video game review aggregator Metacritic.

Some critics praised the game's focus on nostalgia from the earlier days of the event. Other reviewers, such as GameSpot and IGN, criticized the game for being repetitive, lacking in replay value, being overly simplistic, and how wrestler models were beefed up to look too "action figure" like.

== See also ==
- Legends of Wrestling - wrestling game series exclusively featuring professional wrestling legends
- WWE 2K14 - an entry in the WWE 2K series that also allows players to reenact various WrestleMania moments
