= Showdown: Legends of Wrestling =

2004 video game

- Cover art featuring Hulk Hogan, "Macho Man" Randy Savage, André the Giant, Ultimate Warrior, Sting, and Jake "The Snake" Roberts
- Developer: Acclaim Studios Austin
- Publisher: Acclaim Entertainment
- Series: Legends of Wrestling
- Platforms: PlayStation 2, Xbox
- Release: NA: June 24, 2004; PAL: July 2, 2004
- Genre: Sports
- Modes: Single-player, multiplayer

Showdown: Legends of Wrestling is a professional wrestling video game developed by Acclaim Studios Austin and published by Acclaim Entertainment for the PlayStation 2 and Xbox in 2004. It is the sequel to the 2002 video game Legends of Wrestling II. A GameCube version of the game was also planned, but was cancelled. Showdown is the third and final game in the Legends of Wrestling video game series. It was the last game developed by the Austin studio prior to its closure later that year, and the last game released by Acclaim Entertainment in North America.

== Roster ==
The game features a variety of legendary professional wrestlers featured in previous games, including André the Giant, Hulk Hogan and Eddie Guerrero. Wrestlers such as Rob Van Dam depart the series, and are replaced with the likes of Sting, Diamond Dallas Page, Randy Savage and more.

A significant addition for Showdown: Legends of Wrestling was the inclusion of Ultimate Warrior who had been in legal disputes with WWE and successfully had his likeness excluded from WWE SmackDown! Here Comes the Pain the previous year. Also noteworthy is the absence of two Von Erich brothers, Mike and David, who were in both previous Legends of Wrestling games.

Some minor new features included a tribute to deceased legendary wrestlers as well as a tutorial fully narrated by Bret Hart.

=== New Legends ===
- "Mr. Perfect" Curt Hennig
- Diamond Dallas Page
- "The American Dream" Dusty Rhodes
- Jake "The Snake" Roberts
- Nikita Koloff
- "The Macho Man" Randy Savage
- "Ravishing" Rick Rude
- Sting
- Ultimate Warrior

=== Returning Legends ===
- Hulk Hogan
- Jimmy "Superfly" Snuka
- The Road Warriors
- Bret "Hitman" Hart
- Owen Hart
- "British Bulldog" Davey Boy Smith
- The Iron Sheik
- Mr. Fuji
- Terry Funk
- Don Muraco
- Jerry "The King" Lawler
- George "The Animal" Steele
- "Mr. USA" Tony Atlas
- Ricky "The Dragon" Steamboat
- Nikolai Volkoff
- The Nasty Boys
- Ted DiBiase
- Tito Santana
- King Kong Bundy
- Koko B. Ware
- One Man Gang
- Greg "The Hammer" Valentine
- Harley Race
- "Soulman" Rocky Johnson
- The Steiner Brothers
- Eddie Guerrero
- Dynamite Kid
- Ricky Morton
- Robert Gibson
- "Flyin'" Brian Pillman
- "Superstar" Billy Graham
- "Hot Stuff" Eddie Gilbert
- Rick Martel
- Ivan Koloff
- Ivan Putski
- "Cowboy" Bob Orton
- The Sheik
- Kerry Von Erich
- Fritz Von Erich
- Kevin Von Erich
- Dory Funk, Jr.
- Sabu
- "Captain" Lou Albano
- "The Mouth of the South" Jimmy Hart

== Music ==
The theme music in the last two games was composed by "The Mouth of The South" Jimmy Hart. Hart appears as a playable character in all three games. He also composed some of the theme music for World Championship Wrestling and World Wrestling Federation/Entertainment. The 1983 song "Metal Health" by Quiet Riot is used in promo videos for the game and is played at the main menu and Create-a-Legend screens.

== Reception ==
Reception

Aggregate score
| Aggregator | Score | |
| Aggregator | PS2 | Xbox |
|---|---|---|
| Metacritic | 55/100 | 57/100 |

Review scores
| Publication | Score | |
| Publication | PS2 | Xbox |
|---|---|---|
| Electronic Gaming Monthly | 3/10 | 3/10 |
| Game Informer | 6/10 | 6/10 |
| GamePro | 4/5 | 4/5 |
| GameSpot | 6.5/10 | 6.5/10 |
| GameSpy | 2/5 | 2/5 |
| GameZone | 5/10 | 6.5/10 |
| IGN | 5.9/10 | 5.9/10 |
| Official U.S. PlayStation Magazine | 1.5/5 | N/A |
| Official Xbox Magazine (US) | N/A | 5.9/10 |
| X-Play | 2/5 | N/A |

Showdown: Legends of Wrestling received "mixed or average" reviews, according to review aggregator Metacritic.

Xbox Nation called it "a steaming doodie. With extra stank on it." Consumer reaction was negative too, though not excessively so, primarily tempered by the stellar roster available in the game. The inclusion of former WCW commentary team of Bobby "The Brain" Heenan, Tony Schiavone, "The Living Legend" Larry Zbyszko and ring announcer Gary Michael Cappetta was welcomed. The commentary system turned out to be a failure, however, being unsophisticated and repetitive. It has arguably the best roster of popular 1970s, 1980s, and 1990s pro-wrestlers, including many 'legends' who didn't appear in the first two games.

The game was riddled with many serious bugs, glitches, crashes, and lock-ups. This suggested that Showdown: LoW was a rushed product with little attention to quality assurance on Acclaim's part. Other major negative aspects of the game are terribly lacking opponent AI, sluggish character movement, and clumsy game controls. Errors and omissions in the accompanying instruction booklet compounded this. The game's box also advertised commentary from Jerry "The King" Lawler which also was omitted from the game.

== See also ==
- List of licensed wrestling video games
- List of fighting games
