= Millennium Final =

2000 World Championship Wrestling pay-per-view event

- Promotional poster featuring Sting and Kevin Nash
- Promotion: World Championship Wrestling
- Date: November 16, 2000
- City: Oberhausen, North Rhine-Westphalia, Germany
- Venue: Arena Oberhausen
- Attendance: 9,000

Pay-per-view chronology
| ← Previous; Halloween Havoc | Next → Mayhem |

Millennium Final was a Germany-only professional wrestling pay-per-view (PPV) event from World Championship Wrestling (WCW). It took place on November 16, 2000 from Arena Oberhausen in Oberhausen, Germany, marking the finale of WCW's "Millennium Tour". The rights to Millennium Final now belong to WWE after their purchase of WCW in 2001.

== Storylines ==
The event featured wrestlers from pre-existing scripted feuds and storylines. Wrestlers portrayed villains, heroes, or less distinguishable characters in the scripted events that built tension and culminated in a wrestling match or series of matches.

== Event ==
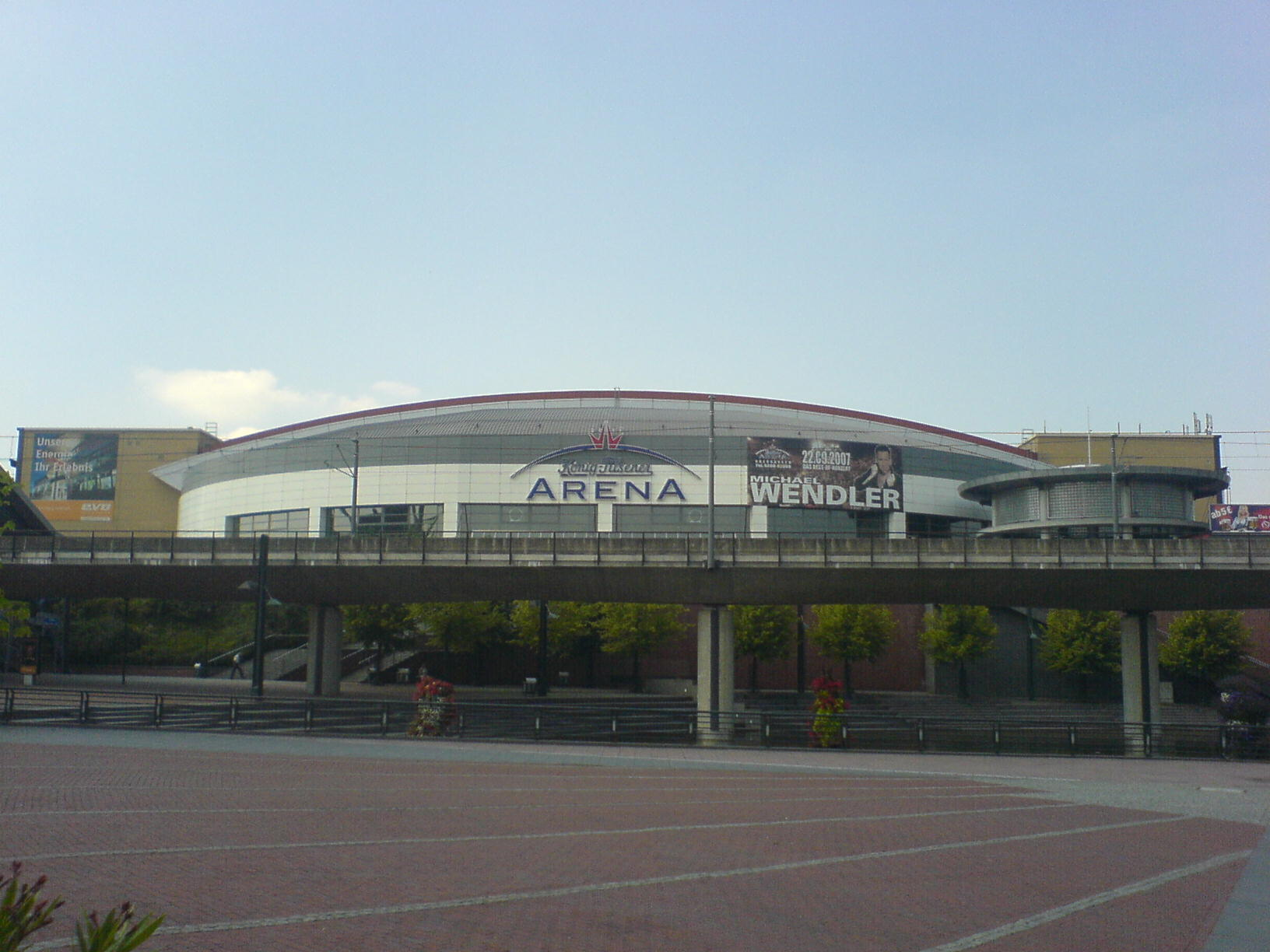
The Arena Oberhausen.

Other on-screen personnel
| Role: | Name: |
|---|---|
| Commentator | Mike Ritter |
| Commentator | Lenz Retzer |
| Interviewer | David Kemp |
| Referee | Mark Johnson |
| Referee | Mickie Jay |
| Referee | Charles Robinson |
| Ring announcer | David Penzer |

The opening bout was a tag team match pitting The Filthy Animals (Billy Kidman and Rey Mysterio Jr.) against KroniK (Brian Adams and Bryan Clark). The bout was won by Kronik, with Kidman being pinned after receiving High Times from Kronik.

The second bout was an 18-man Royal Rumble-style battle royal with the stipulation that the winner would take part in a triple threat match to determine who would face Sting for the WCW European Cup. The battle royal was won by Mike Awesome, who last eliminated Alex Wright.

The third bout was a singles match between Elix Skipper and Kwee Wee. Kwee Wee won the bout by pinfall using a roll-up.

The fourth bout was a singles match between Ernest Miller and Mike Sanders with the stipulation that the winner would be named Commissioner of WCW. Miller won the bout by pinfall following a spin kick.

The fifth bout saw WCW United States Heavyweight Champion Lance Storm defend his title against General Rection. Rection won the bout by disqualification, meaning Storm retained his title.

The sixth bout was an "Octoberfest hardcore match" between Fit Finlay and Norman Smiley. Smiley won the bout by pinfall after driving Finlay through a table.

The seventh bout saw WCW World Tag Team Champions The Natural Born Thrillers (Mark Jindrak and Sean O'Haire) defend their titles against Alex Wright and General Rection (substituting for Disco Inferno). Wright won the bout by pinning Jindrak following a missile dropkick, winning the WCW World Tag Team Championship for himself and Disco Inferno.

The eighth bout was a triple threat match between Alex Wright, Kevin Nash, and Mike Awesome, with the winner facing Sting for the WCW European Cup. Nash won the match by pinning both other men.

The ninth bout saw WCW World Heavyweight Champion Booker T defend his title against Scott Steiner. Booker T won the match by pinfall following a scissor kick.

The main event saw Kevin Nash and Sting face one another for the WCW European Cup, with the German boxer Axel Schulz as special guest referee. Sting won the match by submission.

== Reception ==
In 2011, Thomas Hall of KB's Wrestling Reviews gave the event a rating of D+, stating, "This was just not that good. To be fair though, most European shows aren’t. The fans were kind of there but this had nothing on an English crowd. The guys on the lower half of the card worked very hard and the guys on the main event didn’t, so it fits very well. There’s a lot of house show stuff in here and it’s just not that interesting. If you can actually find this, don’t bother watching it unless you speak German or just REALLY like WCW."

== Results ==
| No. | Results | Stipulations | Times |
|---|---|---|---|
| 1 | KroniK (Brian Adams and Bryan Clark) defeated The Filthy Animals (Billy Kidman and Rey Mysterio Jr.) (with Tygress) by pinfall | Tag team match | 10:15 |
| 2 | Mike Awesome won by last eliminating Alex Wright (Note: Other contestants: Bryan Clark, Disqo, Fit Finlay, Mark Jindrak, Billy Kidman, Konnan, Kwee Wee, Ernest Miller, Rey Mysterio Jr., Sean O'Haire, Gen. Rection, Mike Sanders, Elix Skipper, Norman Smiley, Lance Storm and Brian Adams.) | Battle Royal | 19:07 |
| 3 | Kwee Wee (with Paisley) defeated Elix Skipper by pinfall | Singles match | 10:28 |
| 4 | Ernest Miller defeated Mike Sanders (with Ms. Jones) by pinfall | Singles match for the WCW Commissionership | 05:32 |
| 5 | Gen. Rection defeated Lance Storm (c) (with Major Gunns) by disqualification | Singles match for the WCW United States Heavyweight Championship | 07:34 |
| 6 | Norman Smiley defeated Fit Finlay by pinfall | Octoberfest Hardcore match | 10:27 |
| 7 | Alex Wright and Gen. Rection defeated The Natural Born Thrillers (Mark Jindrak and Sean O'Haire) (c) by pinfall | Tag team match for the WCW World Tag Team Championship | 11:26 |
| 8 | Kevin Nash defeated Alex Wright and Mike Awesome by pinfall | Three-way WCW European Cup qualifying match | 07:24 |
| 9 | Booker T (c) defeated Scott Steiner (with Midajah) by pinfall | Singles match for the WCW World Heavyweight Championship | 11:34 |
| 10 | Sting defeated Kevin Nash by submission | Singles match for the WCW European Cup with Axel Schulz as special guest referee | 05:45 |
(c) / – the champion(s) heading into the match

General Rection replaced Disqo (who was injured) as Alex Wright's tag team partner in the WCW World Tag Team Championship match against The Natural Born Thrillers (Mark Jindrak and Sean O'Haire) who were the WCW World Tag Team Champions at the time, Disqo is recognized by WWE as one-half of the WCW World Tag Team Champions with Alex Wright.
