= Bam Bam Bigelow =

American professional wrestler (1961–2007)

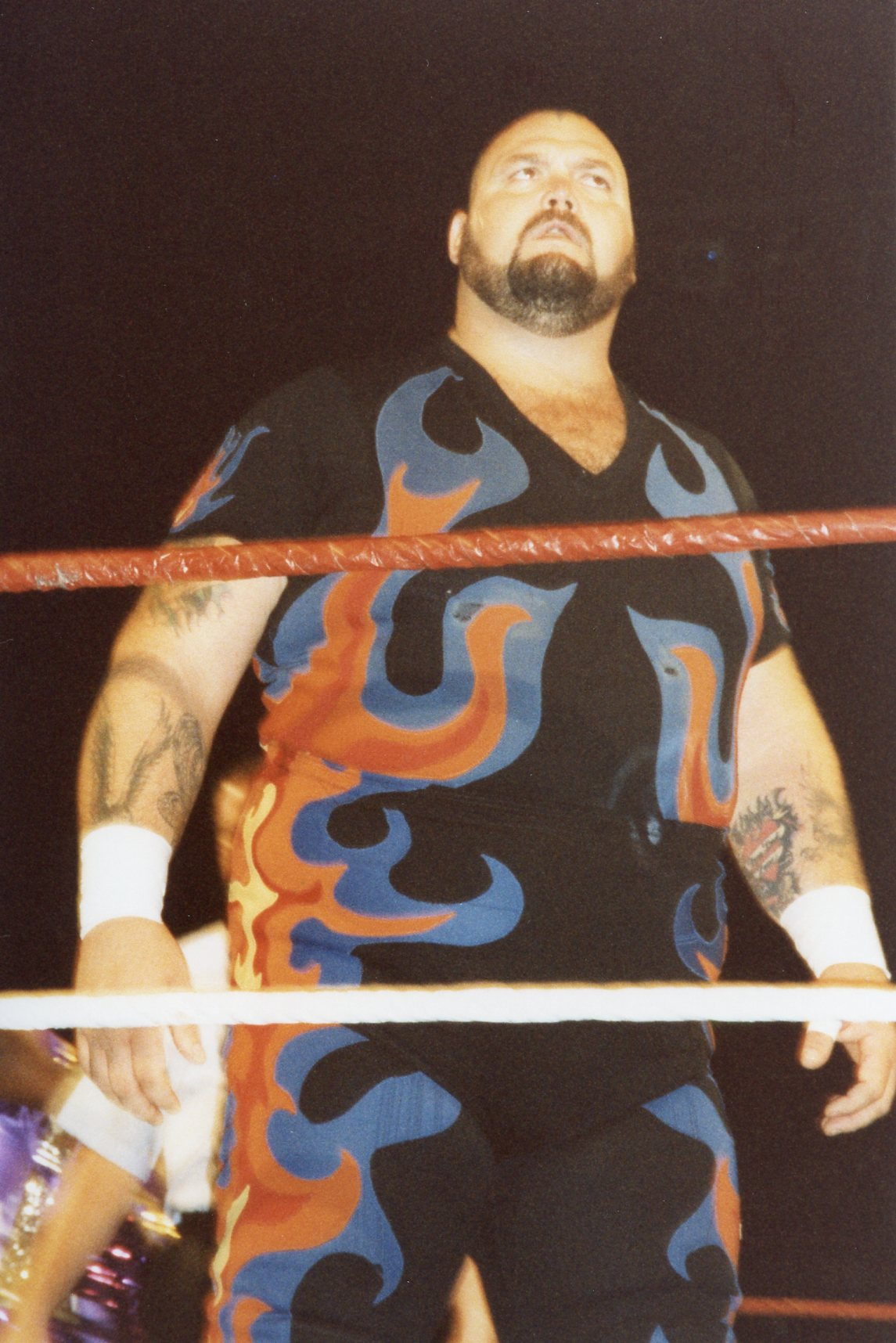
- Bigelow in 1994

Personal information
- Born: Scott Charles Bigelow; September 1, 1961 Mount Laurel, New Jersey, U.S.
- Died: January 19, 2007 (aged 45) Hudson, Florida, U.S.
- Spouse: Dana Fisher (m. 1987; div. 2000)
- Children: 3

Professional wrestling career
- Ring names: Bam Bam Bigelow; Crusher Bam Bam Bigelow; Crusher Yurkov
- Billed height: 6 ft 4 in (193 cm)
- Billed weight: 390 lb (177 kg)
- Billed from: Asbury Park, New Jersey (as Bam Bam Bigelow); Russia (as Crusher Yurkov)
- Trained by: Larry Sharpe
- Debut: August 23, 1985

Scott Charles Bigelow (September 1, 1961 – January 19, 2007) was an American professional wrestler, better known by the ring name Bam Bam Bigelow. Recognizable by his close-to-400-pound frame and the distinctive flame tattoo that spanned most of his bald head, Bigelow was hailed by Ryan Murphy (a writer for Bigelow's former employer WWE) as "the most natural, agile and physically remarkable big man of the past quarter century", while former co-worker Bret Hart described him as "possibly the best working big man in the business."

Bigelow is best known for his appearances with promotions New Japan Pro-Wrestling, the World Wrestling Federation (WWF), World Championship Wrestling (WCW), and Extreme Championship Wrestling (ECW) between 1987 and 2001. Over the course of his career, he held championships including the ECW World Heavyweight Championship, the ECW World Television Championship, the IWGP Tag Team Championship, the WAR World Six-Man Tag Team Championship, and the WCW World Tag Team Championship. Bigelow headlined seven pay-per-views: the first Survivor Series in 1987, Beach Brawl in 1991, King of the Ring in 1993 and 1995, WrestleMania XI in 1995, and November to Remember in 1997 and 1998.

== Early life ==
Bigelow was born on September 1, 1961, in Mount Laurel, New Jersey, United States. He attended Neptune High School in Neptune Township, New Jersey. While he did not graduate, he earned varsity letters in football and wrestling. He placed third in the 1979 New Jersey state wrestling tournament in his sophomore year, but missed his senior season due to a cyst in his lower back. In his late teens, Bigelow competed in arm wrestling tournaments. After dropping out of high school, Bigelow held various jobs including a bodyguard, a bouncer, and a bounty hunter. Bigelow stated that while working as a bounty hunter in Mexico, he was shot in the back by a fugitive and imprisoned for six months in Mexico City.

== Professional wrestling career ==
=== Early career (1985–1987) ===
After being released from prison in Mexico, Bigelow decided to train as a professional wrestler, reasoning "there wasn't much else I was qualified for." In May 1985, he began training at Larry Sharpe's Monster Factory wrestling school in Clementon, New Jersey, with Sharpe regarding him as his prize student. He made his professional wrestling debut on August 23, 1985, at a show held at the Studio 54 nightclub that was promoted by Paul Heyman.

In mid-1986, Bigelow began wrestling for the Memphis, Tennessee-based Continental Wrestling Association under the ring name "Bam Bam Bigelow", with Sharpe acting as his manager. He was quickly established as a monster, competing in multiple handicap matches and regularly being disqualified for illegally jumping off the top rope. Bigelow won his first championship on July 28, 1986, being crowned the new AWA Southern Heavyweight Champion after winning a battle royal. He lost the championship to Jerry Lawler on September 8, 1986, in a Texas Death Match. Following the loss, Bigelow departed the CWA for several months before returning to form a tag team with Lawler and feud with Austin Idol and Tommy Rich. Bigelow continued regularly appearing with the CWA until March 1987. He made brief returns to the CWA and its successor, the United States Wrestling Association, in 1989, 1990, 1991, and 1994.

In late 1986, Bigelow wrestled for the Texas-based World Class Championship Wrestling promotion using the ring name "Crusher Yurkov", portraying a Russian. During his run, he won the WCWA Television Championship. Readers of the Wrestling Observer Newsletter voted Bigelow "Rookie of the Year" for 1986.

=== New Japan Pro-Wrestling (1987–1992) ===
Beginning in January 1987, Bigelow began making lengthy tours of Japan with New Japan Pro-Wrestling (NJPW) under the ring name "Crusher Bam Bam Bigelow", with Larry Sharpe again serving as his manager, reuniting the trainer with Bigelow. During NJPW's "New Year Dash", "Blazing Cherry Blossoms", and "Summer Big Fight Series" events in 1987, Bigelow repeatedly faced Antonio Inoki in a series of matches, including unsuccessfully challenging him for the IWGP Heavyweight Championship in the Ryōgoku Kokugikan in Tokyo in August 1987.

In January 1989, Bigelow formed a tag team with Big Van Vader known as "Big, Bad, and Dangerous" which lasted until May 1989. He unsuccessfully challenged for the IWGP Heavyweight Championship on several occasions, including a bout against incumbent champion Vader in September 1989 billed as the "Super Power Battle In Osaka". Bigelow and Vader reformed their tag team in 1990. In June 1990, Bigelow also appeared with All Japan Pro Wrestling, competing in its Super Power Series against opponents such as "Dr. Death" Steve Williams, Terry Gordy, Toshiaki Kawada, and Kenta Kobashi.

In March 1991, Bigelow and Vader defeated Doom in the Tokyo Dome as part of the WCW/New Japan Supershow I. In March 1992, Bigelow and Vader defeated Hiroshi Hase and Keiji Muto for the IWGP Tag Team Championship. Their reign lasted until June 1992, when they were defeated by the Steiner Brothers. Bigelow made his final appearances with NJPW in October 1992, participating in the Super Grade Tag League with Keiji Muto, before leaving Japan to return to the WWF. Bigelow was unable to return to NJPW later in his career due to an exclusivity agreement signed between NJPW and World Championship Wrestling (WCW).

=== World Wrestling Federation (1987–1988) ===
Bigelow debuted in the World Wrestling Federation (WWF) in May 1987 as "Bam Bam Bigelow". He spent several months wrestling exclusively in dark matches and on house shows before making his televised debut. Upon his debut, Bigelow featured in a storyline in which various heel managers such as Jimmy Hart, Johnny Valiant, Mr. Fuji, Bobby Heenan, and Slick vied to have him as their client in what was dubbed "the Battle for Bam Bam", only for Jesse Ventura to tell them that they were out of the running for Bam Bam. The storyline culminated in September 1987 when Bigelow denounced the last manager in the running, Slick and announced that his manager would be Oliver Humperdink, establishing him as a face.

In September and October 1987, Bigelow won a series of battle royals. He made his pay-per-view debut at the inaugural Survivor Series, teaming with Don Muraco, Hulk Hogan, Ken Patera, and Paul Orndorff in a loss to André the Giant, King Kong Bundy, Butch Reed, One Man Gang, and Rick Rude; Bigelow was the last man eliminated for his team. Following the bout, he faced One Man Gang in a series of matches. At the 1987 Slammy Awards in December, he received an award for "Best Head"; later in the evening, he joined the rest of the WWF roster to sing "If You Only Knew". He began feuding with Ted DiBiase in January 1988 (at one point, facing him in a match where DiBiase was announced as the WWF Champion), on several occasions teaming with Hogan to face DiBiase and André the Giant. At WrestleMania IV in March 1988, Bigelow took part in the tournament for the vacant WWF World Heavyweight Championship, losing to One Man Gang in the first round. Bigelow went on to face One Man Gang in a further series of matches throughout mid-1988.

In June 1988, Bigelow lost to André the Giant in a Madison Square Garden bout airing on WWF on MSG Network in which Bret Hart stated that André "practically killed him" by working stiff due to tension between them; immediately following the match, Bigelow returned to the locker room, collected his bag, and left the Garden. Bigelow left the WWF in July 1988 due to a combination of knee injuries (tears to both anterior cruciate ligaments) and heat from other members of the roster resentful of the push he had received despite being a rookie.

=== World Championship Wrestling (1988–1989, 1990) ===
Bigelow debuted in Jim Crockett Promotions in September 1988, shortly before its rebranding as World Championship Wrestling (WCW). He was managed by Oliver Humperdink who had also joined the promotion. Bigelow quickly began feuding with The Four Horsemen. In November 1988, he unsuccessfully challenged Ric Flair, the leader of The Four Horsemen, for the NWA World Heavyweight Championship in a dark match in the Charlotte Coliseum. In late 1988, he began challenging Horseman Barry Windham over the NWA United States Heavyweight Championship; he lost to Windham by count-out at Starrcade '88: True Gritt in December 1988 after being attacked by the Horsemen's manager, J. J. Dillon. Bigelow was unwilling to sign an exclusive contract with WCW due to his touring commitments with New Japan Pro-Wrestling, and he left the company in January 1989.

Bigelow returned to WCW in April 1990, once again reuniting with Oliver Humperdink. During this stint he wrestled primarily on house shows and occasionally on NWA Power Hour and NWA Main Event. He joined the villainous "Sullivan's Slaughterhouse" stable with Kevin Sullivan and Cactus Jack. At the Capital Combat pay-per-view in May 1990, Bigelow teamed with Sullivan and Cactus Jack in a loss to Norman the Lunatic and the Road Warriors. At Clash of the Champions XI: Coastal Crush, he lost to Tommy Rich via disqualification after refusing to break a choke. Bigelow's second stint with WCW lasted until August 1990 when he once again returned to New Japan Pro-Wrestling.

=== Universal Wrestling Federation (1991) ===
Bigelow joined the fledgling Universal Wrestling Federation in March 1991, making several appearances on UWF Fury Hour. During his time in the promotion, he had a short feud with "Cowboy" Bob Orton. His final appearance with the UWF was in June 1991 at the Beach Brawl pay-per-view, where he lost to Steve Williams in a main event bout to determine the inaugural UWF SportsChannel Television Champion.

=== Universal Wrestling Association (1992) ===
In February 1992, Bigelow began wrestling in Mexico for the Universal Wrestling Association, appearing on its UWA TV program. He primarily wrestled in six-man tag team matches, with his regular allies including André the Giant (with who he reconciled following their altercation in 1988), the Samoan SWAT Team, and Rambo and his opponents including El Canek, Fishman, and Villanos III, IV, and V. He was one of a series of foreign challengers to face El Canek. Bigelow did not enjoy working in Mexico, and he left the UWA in May 1992.

=== World Wrestling Federation (1992–1995) ===
==== Alliance with Luna Vachon (1992–1994) ====
Bigelow returned to the World Wrestling Federation in October 1992, scoring a series of wins on WWF Superstars and WWF Wrestling Challenge. He made his pay-per-view return in January 1993, decisively defeating Big Boss Man at the Royal Rumble. Throughout early 1993, Bigelow wrestled primarily on house shows, including tours of Europe in February and April. He repeatedly unsuccessfully challenged Bret Hart for the WWF World Heavyweight Championship. A scheduled match between Bigelow and Kamala at WrestleMania IX in April was cancelled due to time constraints. In June 1993, Luna Vachon was introduced as Bigelow's valet and "main squeeze" (love interest). Bigelow defeated Typhoon on the May 10 episode of Monday Night Raw to qualify for the first-ever televised King of the Ring tournament; at the King of the Ring pay-per-view on June 13, Bigelow defeated Jim Duggan in the quarter-finals and received a bye in the semi-finals, but lost to Bret Hart in the tournament final in what was his third pay-per-view main event.

Following King of the Ring, Bigelow began feuding with Tatanka. In July and August, Bigelow toured Europe with the WWF Later in August, Bigelow teamed with Yokozuna to unsuccessfully challenge the Steiner Brothers for the WWF World Tag Team Championship. At SummerSlam on August 30, Bigelow and the Headshrinkers lost to Tatanka and the Smoking Gunns. In October 1993, Bigelow and Luna Vachon began feuding with Doink the Clown; the Brooklyn Brawler substituted for Bigelow in some matches after he took a brief leave of absence in early November to care for his pregnant wife. A match was scheduled for Survivor Series pitting Bigelow, Bastion Booger, and the Headshrinkers against four Doinks; at Survivor Series the four Doinks were revealed as being the Bushwhackers and Men on a Mission. Bigelow was defeated by Mabel. The match was poorly critically received, being named "Worst Worked Match of the Year" by the Wrestling Observer Newsletter.

In January 1994, Bigelow had a short feud with Bastion Booger after Booger kissed Vachon. At the 1994 Royal Rumble on January 22, Bigelow lost to Tatanka, substituting for Ludvig Borga. During the Royal Rumble match itself, Bigelow eliminated Tatanka, Doink, and several other wrestlers before being eliminated by Lex Luger. Bigelow was also one of multiple villainous wrestlers to interfere in WWF World Heavyweight Champion Yokozuna's title defense against The Undertaker, helping Yokozuna retain the Championship. Following the Royal Rumble, Bigelow continued his feud with Doink, culminating in a tag team match at WrestleMania X where Bigelow and Vachon defeated Doink and his ally Dink to end their rivalry. Following WrestleMania X, Bigelow took part in the WWF's tour of Europe and Israel. An April 24, 1993, bout between Bigelow and Bret Hart in Barcelona, Spain was included on the 2005 DVD documentary film Bret "Hit Man" Hart: The Best There Is, the Best There Was, the Best There Ever Will Be at Hart's request. On the May 16, 1994, episode of Monday Night Raw, Bigelow defeated Sparky Plugg to qualify for that year's King of the Ring tournament. The following month, he lost to Razor Ramon in the quarter-final of the 1994 King of the Ring.

==== Million Dollar Corporation (1994–1995) ====
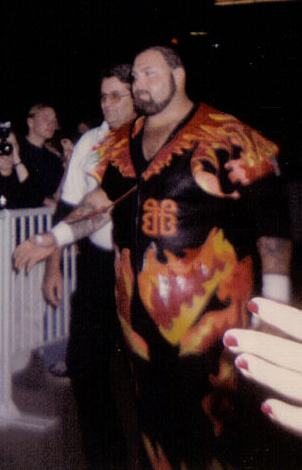
Bigelow in the WWF in 1995

On the June 27, 1994, episode of Monday Night Raw, Bigelow broke ties with Luna Vachon, with Ted DiBiase subsequently announcing that he had bought Bigelow's contract. Bigelow became a member of DiBiase's new stable, the Million Dollar Corporation. Throughout the summer, Bigelow had a series of matches with Mabel; the two faced each other during the "Summer Fest" and "Hart Attack" tours of Europe. In July 1994, while under WWF contract, Bigelow returned to Japan to work for Genichiro Tenryu's Wrestle Association R as "Crusher Bam Bam Bigelow". Teaming with Tenryu and Atsushi Onita, he won the "Super Battle of 6 Men" tournament. At SummerSlam on August 29, Bigelow and fellow Million Dollar Corporation member Irwin R. Schyster defeated the Headshrinkers by disqualification. At Survivor Series on November 23, the "Million Dollar Team" (Bigelow, King Kong Bundy, Tatanka, and the Heavenly Bodies) defeated "Guts and Glory" (Adam Bomb, Lex Luger, Mabel, and The Smoking Gunns).

In November 1994, Bigelow and fellow Million Dollar Corporation member Tatanka entered a tournament for the vacant WWF World Tag Team Championship. They defeated Men on a Mission in the quarter-finals and The Headshrinkers in the semi-finals. Bigelow made another appearance with Wrestle Association R in Japan in December 1994, winning a round robin challenge match at the WAR MEGA-POWER event. On January 22, 1995, at the Royal Rumble, Bigelow and Tatanka lost to the underdog team of The 1-2-3 Kid and Bob Holly in the finals of the tournament for the vacant WWF Tag Team Championship in an upset.

The World Wrestling Federation had approached former New York Giants All-Pro linebacker Lawrence Taylor about performing at WrestleMania XI in an attempt to generate interest. After Taylor agreed to wrestle a match, Bigelow was selected as his opponent. The storyline saw Taylor introduced at the Royal Rumble, where he was sitting in the audience at ringside. After Bigelow was pinned by The 1-2-3 Kid, Bigelow took umbrage after noticing Taylor laughing. Upon Bigelow confronting Taylor at ringside, he offered Bigelow a handshake, but Bigelow instead shoved him to the ground. On the following episode of Monday Night Raw, it was announced that Bigelow had been temporarily suspended. During an interview segment with Vince McMahon, Bigelow declined to apologize to Taylor, instead challenging him to a match "any time, anyplace." Taylor initially declined the match, but after repeated insults from Bigelow, he accepted the challenge on February 27, 1995, at the WrestleMania XI press conference. The buildup to the match included Taylor staging a public workout in a ring that had been erected in Times Square in New York City at which he was confronted by Bigelow, resulting in a brawl. On April 2, 1995, Taylor defeated Bigelow in the main event of WrestleMania XI. The storyline garnered significant media coverage, with outlets such as Sports Illustrated, SportsCenter, and USA Today featuring it. Bigelow was credited as having carried the inexperienced Taylor.

Following WrestleMania, Bigelow participated in the "WWF in High Gear" tour of Europe. Upon his return to the United States, he challenged Diesel for the WWF Championship on the April 24, 1995, episode of Monday Night Raw. After Diesel defeated Bigelow, Ted DiBiase announced that he was firing Bigelow. After Bigelow retaliated, the other members of the Million Dollar Corporation attacked him until he was saved by Diesel, thus turning Bigelow face. In the main event of King of the Ring on June 25, 1995, Bigelow and Diesel teamed together to defeat Million Dollar Corporation members Sid and Tatanka. Following King of the Ring, Bigelow faced Million Dollar Corporation members Sid, Tatanka, King Kong Bundy, and Kama in a series of matches. At In Your House 2, he defeated Henry Godwinn, who was auditioning to join the Million Dollar Corporation. At In Your House 3, he lost to British Bulldog. In October 1995, he took part in the "Full Metal" tour, marking his final tour of Europe with the WWF. In late 1995, Bigelow negotiated an early release from his contract with WWF chairman Vince McMahon after becoming disillusioned by the creative influence of The Kliq. He made his final appearance with the WWF on November 19, 1995, at Survivor Series, losing to the recently debuted Goldust.

=== United States independent circuit; Japanese tours (1995–1998) ===
After leaving the World Wrestling Federation in late 1995, Bigelow began working on the United States independent circuit. In March 1996, Bigelow became the inaugural NWA Northeast Heavyweight Champion of the newly founded NWA Northeast promotion, defeating Jim Neidhart in a tournament final. Although Bigelow only made a handful of appearances with the promotion, his reign officially lasted until October 1998 when the title was vacated. In May 1996, Bigelow defeated Typhoon to win the vacant Universal Superstars of America Heavyweight Championship. In July 1996, he defeated King Kong Bundy at NWA New Jersey. Bigelow returned to Wrestle Association R in August 1996 for a tour that lasted until the end of the year. He briefly held the WAR World Six-Man Tag Team Championship with Hiromichi Fuyuki and Yoji Anjo in October 1996. In 1997, Bigelow was named as the inaugural Heavyweight Champion of the newly founded World Star Wrestling Federation. In June 1997, Bigelow appeared at the World Wrestling Peace Festival, an inter-promotional supercard staged at the Los Angeles Memorial Sports Arena by Antonio Inoki, where he faced Chris Jericho and Konnan in a three way dance. In April 1998, Bigelow wrestled two bouts for the Japanese promotion Frontier Martial-Arts Wrestling, participating in the "Fighting Creation" event.

=== Extreme Championship Wrestling (1996, 1997–1998) ===
==== Initial appearances (1996) ====
Bigelow debuted in the Philadelphia, Pennsylvania-based Extreme Championship Wrestling promotion in February 1996 at Big Apple Blizzard Blast, confronting Taz. Later that month at Just Another Night he defeated Cactus Jack in an impromptu match after Jack mocked him for his loss to Lawrence Taylor. In March 1996 at Big Ass Extreme Bash he again confronted Taz. Bigelow made a further appearance in October 1996, defeating Terry "Bam Bam" Gordy at Ultimate Jeopardy in what was dubbed the "Battle of the Bam Bams".

==== The Triple Threat (1997–1998) ====
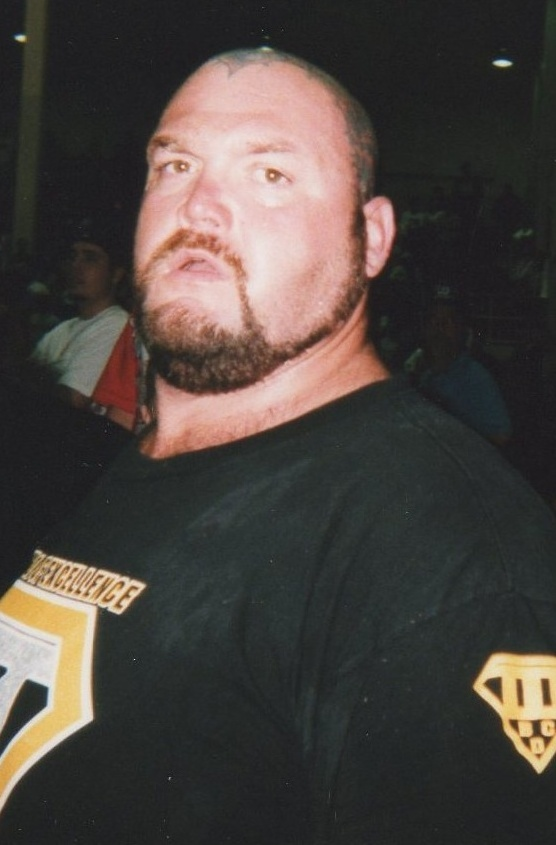
Bigelow in Extreme Championship Wrestling in 1998

Bigelow began appearing regularly with ECW in May 1997. He was reintroduced at Chapter 2, being named the new member of The Triple Threat alongside Shane Douglas, Chris Candido, and Francine. He was undefeated until August 1997, when he suffered an upset loss to the diminutive Spike Dudley at Born to be Wired. Bigelow made his ECW pay-per-view debut at Hardcore Heaven later that month, decisively defeating Dudley in a rematch. During the match, Bigelow pressed Dudley above his head and hurled him into the ECW Arena audience. Bigelow went on to defeat Dudley in a series of further matches over the following months.

On the October 20, 1997, episode of ECW Hardcore TV, Rick Rude selected Bigelow as the challenger for Shane Douglas' ECW World Heavyweight Championship. Bigelow accepted the match and went on to win the Championship, renouncing his membership in The Triple Threat as a result. Over the course of his reign, Bigelow successfully retained the Championship in bouts with challengers including Al Snow, Chris Candido, Mikey Whipwreck, and Paul Diamond. He began feuding with Douglas, on one occasion accidentally breaking the pelvis of Douglas' valet Francine while performing a gorilla press slam on her. In the main event of November to Remember on November 30, 1997, Douglas defeated Bigelow to regain the Championship.

Bigelow continued feuding with Douglas and the rest of The Triple Threat, allying with Taz. At Hostile City Showdown in January 1998, Bigelow and Taz faced The Triple Threat in a handicap match; during the match, Bigelow betrayed Taz, rejoining The Triple Threat. At Living Dangerously on March 1, 1998, Bigelow defeated Taz for the ECW World Television Championship in the Asbury Park Convention Hall in his adopted hometown. During the match, Bigelow collapsed backwards while Taz was applying his Tazmission hold, driving both men through the ring canvas. Bigelow's reign lasted until the April 4, 1998, episode of ECW Hardcore TV where he lost the Championship to Rob Van Dam.

After defeating New Jack at Wrestlepalooza, Axl Rotten at It Ain't Seinfeld, and Al Snow at A Matter of Respect, Bigelow unsuccessfully challenged Taz for the ECW FTW Heavyweight Championship in a falls count anywhere match at Heat Wave after both men fell through the entrance ramp. Bigelow subsequently teamed with Candido and then Douglas to unsuccessfully challenge Rob Van Dam and Sabu for the ECW World Tag Team Championship. The feud between The Triple Threat and Taz, Van Dam, and Sabu culminated in a six-man tag team match in the main event of November to Remember, in which Sabu pinned Douglas. This marked Bigelow's final appearance with ECW as he left the promotion to rejoin World Championship Wrestling immediately thereafter.

=== World Championship Wrestling (1998–2001) ===
==== Early appearances (1998–1999) ====
In November 1998, Bigelow abruptly left ECW after experiencing bounced checks, signing what Brian Fitz and Christopher Murray described as a "lucrative" two-year contract with World Championship Wrestling. He made his return to WCW on the November 16, 1998, episode of Monday Nitro, interrupting a match between Chavo Guerrero Jr. and Scott Putski. After attacking both competitors, Bigelow called out WCW World Heavyweight Champion Goldberg and brawled with him in the ring. At World War 3 on November 22, Bigelow interfered in the titular match, attacking Goldberg. In his first match back with the company, he wrestled Goldberg to a no contest on the December 7 episode of Monday Nitro. At Starrcade on December 27, Bigelow was one of several wrestlers to interfere in the main event bout between Goldberg and Kevin Nash, helping Nash pin Goldberg for the first time in his career and win the WCW World Heavyweight Championship. After defeating Wrath at Souled Out in January 1999, Bigelow lost to Goldberg at SuperBrawl IX the following month.

In March 1999, Bigelow lost to Rey Mysterio Jr., helping establish him as a "giant killer". Later that month, he entered a tournament for the vacant WCW United States Heavyweight Championship, losing to Meng in the first round. He began competing in WCW's nascent hardcore division, including a triple threat falls count anywhere match against fellow ECW alumni Raven and Hardcore Hak at Uncensored, a hardcore match against Hak at Spring Stampede, a kendo stick match against Hugh Morrus on Monday Nitro, and a hardcore match against Brian Knobbs at Slamboree.

==== Jersey Triad (1999) ====
On the May 31, 1999, episode of Monday Nitro, Bigelow and Diamond Dallas Page challenged Raven and Perry Saturn for the WCW World Tag Team Championship. After Bigelow and Page attacked Raven prior to the match, Saturn faced them alone until Chris Kanyon joined the match as a substitute for Raven; however, Bigelow and Page pinned Kanyon to win the Championship. The following week on Nitro, Kanyon joined Page and Bigelow to form a stable, the Jersey Triad. Page and Bigelow lost the WCW World Tag Team Championship to Saturn and Chris Benoit on the June 10 episode of Thunder. At The Great American Bash later that month, Page and Kanyon defeated Benoit and Saturn for the Championship following interference from Bigelow; subsequently, they enacted the "Freebird Rule", meaning Bigelow was also recognized as champion and any two members of the Jersey Triad could defend the Championship. At Bash at the Beach, The Jersey Triad successfully defended the Championship against Saturn and Benoit in a handicap match. Their reign lasted until Road Wild in August 1999, when they lost to Harlem Heat. The Jersey Triad disbanded the following month.

==== Hardcore division; final appearances (1999–2001) ====
After a short absence, Bigelow returned to WCW television on the October 25 episode of Monday Nitro, losing to Norman Smiley in the first round of a tournament for the WCW World Heavyweight Championship. He then returned to the hardcore division. On the February 7, 2000, episode of Monday Nitro, Bigelow defeated Brian Knobbs for the WCW Hardcore Championship. He lost the championship back to Knobbs later that month at SuperBrawl X. In March 2000, Bigelow participated in WCW's "Millennium Tour" of the United Kingdom. Later that month, he began feuding with The Wall after he developed a sadistic streak and attacked various younger wrestlers, including David Flair and Crowbar. The feud culminated in a bout at Uncensored which Bigelow won by disqualification. In June 2000, Bigelow briefly reunited with his former Triple Threat stablemates Shane Douglas and Chris Candido, after which he was inactive for several months due to severe burns he had sustained in a fire.

Bigelow returned to WCW television once more in October 2000. In November, he was paired with Mike Awesome in a "Lethal Lottery" tournament to determine the number one contender to the WCW World Heavyweight Championship. After Bigelow and Awesome lost to Scott Steiner and Sting, they began feuding. After Bigelow attacked Awesome prior to a scheduled match between them at Mayhem in November, Bigelow defeated Awesome's substitute, Sgt. A.W.O.L. The feud culminated in an ambulance match at Starrcade in December which was won by Awesome after Bigelow fell through the roof of the ambulance. Over the following months, Bigelow primarily wrestled on Thunder. In early 2001, Bigelow began feuding with Shawn Stasiak, losing to him at WCW's final pay-per-view, Greed. The feud culminated in a match on the final episode of Monday Nitro on March 26 in which Stasiak defeated Bigelow.

=== Late career (2001–2006) ===
After World Championship Wrestling was purchased by the World Wrestling Federation in March 2001, Bigelow opted not to accept a buy-out on his contract with Time Warner (the parent company of WCW). He was one of the performers considered by the newly-formed NWA Total Nonstop Action promotion in early 2002 but was unavailable due to his contract. After his contract expired in June 2002, Bigelow returned to the independent circuit. He wrestled sporadically, mainly appearing with promotions in the Northeastern United States. In September 2002, Bigelow wrestled in Germany for the European Wrestling Promotion. He made several appearances for USA Pro Wrestling, winning the USA Pro Heavyweight Championship twice during 2002. In 2004, Bigelow announced he would no longer take major bumps or chair shots for fear of exacerbating his health problems. He wrestled his final match on November 7, 2006 (10 weeks before his death) for the Florida-based American Combat Wrestling promotion, teaming with Ralph Mosca as "The Syndicate" to defeat Overkill (Legion Cage and Marcus Hall) for the ACW Tag Team Championship; the titles were vacated later that month.

== Professional wrestling style and persona ==
Bigelow was noted for what Michael McAvennie described as "uncanny nimbleness" given his height and weight. Capable of executing cartwheels, forward rolls, and dropkicks, he was described by Jake Black as "a powerful giant who could move like a cruiserweight". Journalist Dave Meltzer commented "Bigelow was something of a phenomenon when he came into pro wrestling in 1986." He was nicknamed "the Beast from the East". His character was described by Michael Ball as a "punk".

Bigelow had a distinctive appearance, with a large frame, shaved head, 19 tattoos (including various animals and mythical creatures on his arms and a fireball on the top of his head), goatee, missing front tooth, and what journalist Jon Gelberg described as "perpetually narrowed" eyes. Initially wrestling in black cut-off shorts and a cut-off t-shirt with "I Am Monster" written on the back, after joining the World Wrestling Federation in 1987 he began wearing clothes illustrated with flames, a theme he continued throughout the remainder of his career.

At the outset of his career, Bigelow used the Nuclear Splash (a diving splash) as his finisher. He later used a slingshot splash and an over-the-shoulder reverse piledriver that he named Greetings From Asbury Park in reference to his adopted hometown and the Bruce Springsteen album. Deceptively agile, Bigelow also used aerial maneuvers such as moonsaults and diving headbutts.

== Mixed martial arts career ==
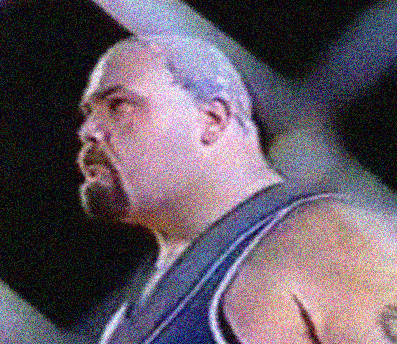
Bigelow before his sole mixed martial arts match at a U-Japan MMA event in 1996

On November 17, 1996, Bigelow faced Kimo Leopoldo in a mixed martial arts bout promoted by U-Japan in Tokyo. Bigelow was dominated through the bout, submitting to a rear naked choke in the first round. In a 1998 interview, Bigelow claimed that he had been asked to throw the fight and that he had been paid $100,000 (equivalent to $205,283 in 2025) for the fight.

=== Mixed martial arts record ===
Professional record breakdown
1 match	0 wins	1 loss
By knockout	0	0
By submission	0	1
By decision	0	0

Res.	Record	Opponent	Method	Event	Date	Round	Time	Location	Notes
Loss	0-1	(United States) Kimo Leopoldo	Submission (rear naked choke)	U-Japan	November 17, 1996	1	2:15	Tokyo, Japan	

== Acting career ==
During his professional wrestling career, Bigelow took on a number of acting roles, generally playing menacing villainous characters. He also appeared in a commercial for Slim Jim. He was a member of the Screen Actors Guild.

Filmography
Year	Title	Role
1992	Snake Eater III: His Law	Goose
1995	Major Payne	Huge Biker
1996	Joe's Apartment	Boss Construction
2000	Icebreaker	SWAT Team
2000	Ready to Rumble	Himself

== Personal life ==
As a young man, Bigelow was repeatedly arrested on charges including aggravated assault, attempted kidnapping, criminal restraint, drug possession, robbery, and sexual assault. He spent nine months in the Albert C. Wagner Youth Correctional Facility as a teenager, and was later imprisoned for six months in Mexico City for illegally acting as a bounty hunter in Mexico.

Bigelow married Asbury Park native Dana Fisher in 1987. The couple had three children before divorcing in 2000. Following the divorce, Fisher sued Bigelow for non-payment of child support.

On July 4, 2000, Bigelow received second degree burns on 40% of his body while rescuing three children from a fire in Wayside, New Jersey. He spent 10 days in a hospital after the incident.

In 2004, Bigelow opened a deli in Hamlin, Wayne County, Pennsylvania, that sold a two pound "Beast Burger". The restaurant later folded. Bigelow later relocated to Florida in hope that the warm weather would help with his chronic pain.

In May 2004, Bigelow was charged with endangering the welfare of a child through reckless driving. He attributed the incident to a seizure he had suffered, and the charges were dropped two months later. In August 2004, Bigelow was convicted of possession of marijuana.

On October 2, 2005, Bigelow was hospitalized with a broken nose and several lacerations after crashing his Harley-Davidson motorcycle on Florida State Road 50 in Hernando County, Florida. Bigelow's girlfriend was his passenger at the time of the crash; she suffered severe injuries, but eventually made a complete recovery and remained with Bigelow until his death.

For much of his professional wrestling career, Bigelow suffered from an addiction to OxyContin. By the end of his life, Bigelow was suffering from multiple health issues and receiving Social Security Disability Benefits. He had atherosclerosis, diabetes, and a persistent infection. He also had severe back problems; back surgeries had reduced his height by 2 inches (5.1 cm).

== Death ==
Bigelow's girlfriend found him dead in his home in Hudson, Florida, at approximately 10 a.m. EST on the morning of January 19, 2007. He was 45 years old. An autopsy found that Bigelow's death was due to multiple drugs found in his system, including toxic levels of cocaine and benzodiazepines. A contributing factor to Bigelow's death was atherosclerosis. His death was ruled an accident by the Pasco-Pinellas Medical Examiner.

== Championships and accomplishments ==
- American Combat Wrestling
  - ACW Tag Team Championship (1 time) - with Ralph Mosca
- Continental Wrestling Association
  - AWA Southern Heavyweight Championship (1 time)
- Extreme Championship Wrestling
  - ECW World Heavyweight Championship (1 time)
  - ECW World Television Championship (1 time)
- NWA Northeast
  - NWA Northeast Heavyweight Championship (1 time, first)
- New Japan Pro-Wrestling
  - IWGP Tag Team Championship (1 time) – with Big Van Vader
- Pro Wrestling Illustrated
  - Ranked No. 24 of the top 500 singles wrestlers in the PWI 500 in 1994
- Universal Superstars of America
  - USA Heavyweight Championship (1 time)
- USA Pro Wrestling
  - USA Pro Heavyweight Championship (2 times)
- World Championship Wrestling
  - WCW Hardcore Championship (1 time)
  - WCW World Tag Team Championship (2 times) – with Diamond Dallas Page (1 time) and Diamond Dallas Page and Chris Kanyon (1 time) (Note: Bigelow defended the Championship with either Page or Kanyon under the "Freebird Rule" for this reign.)
- World Class Wrestling Association
  - WCWA Television Championship (1 time)
- World Star Wrestling Federation
  - WSWF Heavyweight Championship (1 time, first)
- World Wrestling Federation
  - Slammy Award for Best Head (1987) with Gene Okerlund
- Wrestle Association R
  - WAR World Six-Man Tag Team Championship (1 time) – with Hiromichi Fuyuki and Yoji Anjo
  - Six Man Tag Team Tournament (1994) – with Atsushi Onita and Genichiro Tenryu
- Wrestling Observer Newsletter
  - Rookie of the Year (1986)
  - Most Unimproved (1988)

== See also ==
- List of premature professional wrestling deaths
- Jersey Triad
- Million Dollar Corporation
- The Triple Threat
