= World War 3 (1998) =

1998 World Championship Wrestling pay-per-view event

- Promotional poster featuring various wrestlers
- Promotion: World Championship Wrestling
- Brand(s): WCW nWo
- Date: November 22, 1998
- City: Auburn Hills, Michigan
- Venue: The Palace of Auburn Hills
- Attendance: 17,670
- Buy rate: 250,000
- Tagline: 60 Men. 3 Rings. 1 Survivor.

Pay-per-view chronology
| ← Previous; Halloween Havoc | Next → Starrcade |

World War 3 chronology
| ← Previous; 1997 | Next → Final |

The 1998 World War 3 was the fourth and final World War 3 professional wrestling pay-per-view (PPV) event produced by World Championship Wrestling (WCW). The event took place on November 22, 1998 from The Palace of Auburn Hills in Auburn Hills, Michigan, the same location as the previous year's event. This event marked the only instance where the traditional World War 3 battle royal did not headline the event.

Eight matches were contested at the event. The main event was a standard wrestling match between Diamond Dallas Page and Bret Hart for the WCW United States Heavyweight Championship, in which Page pinned Hart to retain the title. The World War 3 match, where the winner would receive a WCW World Heavyweight Championship match at Starrcade, was won by Kevin Nash. Billy Kidman defeated Juventud Guerrera to become the new WCW Cruiserweight Champion, marking the only time ever that a title changed hands at a World War 3 event.

== Storylines ==
The event featured wrestlers from pre-existing scripted feuds and storylines. Wrestlers portrayed villains, heroes, or less distinguishable characters in the scripted events that built tension and culminated in a wrestling match or series of matches.

== Event ==
Other on-screen personnel
| Role: | Name: |
|---|---|
| Commentators | Tony Schiavone |
| Commentators | Bobby Heenan |
| Commentators | Mike Tenay |
| Interviewer | Gene Okerlund |
| Ring announcers | David Penzer |
| Ring announcers | Michael Buffer |
| Referees | Scott Dickinson |
| Referees | Mickie Jay |
| Referees | Charles Robinson |
| Referees | Billy Silverman |

The match between Kevin Nash and Scott Hall was cancelled after Eric Bischoff came out and ordered Vincent, Scott Norton, The Giant, Stevie Ray and Brian Adams to attack Hall. Nash then came out and saved Hall from the beatdown. In the "World War 3" World War 3 battle royal, Nash last eliminated Luger to earn a shot at the WCW World Heavyweight Championship at Starrcade.

== Reception ==
In 2017, Kevin Pantoja of 411Mania gave the event a rating of 3.0 [Bad], stating, "Exactly what you can expect from WCW in 1998. Lots of bad matches, one or two good ones and a lot of questionable booking decisions. How do you not book your top champion? He was the most over thing in any segment he was involved in. They scheduled some matches and didn’t deliver. The show gets off to one of the worst starts ever until the Cruiserweight Title went on. Jericho’s match was heatless, World War 3 itself was kind of a mess and the main event got ruined by the booking nonsense."

In 2021, Lance Augustine of TJR Wrestling gave the event a rating of 5.75/10, stating, "So, this show didn’t embarrass itself with any offense [sic] matches as Halloween Havoc did, but I also wouldn’t say it was a step up. This show was full of underwhelming matches to start the show and a bunch of rematches. I thought the show was average, but I had to get it a higher rating than Halloween Havoc on principal [sic]. It did have some standouts like Guerrera vs. Kidman and Hart vs. Page, which was a good thing. The one question I have every time I watch a WCW show in 1998 is why The World Title never seems to be defended on the show. Goldberg had a really good match with Diamond Dallas Page at Halloween Havoc, and on this show, he was involved in a forgettable segment between The Steiner Brothers. You could tell the wheels were starting to fall off a bit with the booking, and we are in for a wild ride as we get into the dreaded years of 1999 and 2000 era WCW."

In 2022, Paul Matthews of Classic Wrestling Review described the event as "lackluster," stating, "Welcome to Bait & Switch: The PPV Part 2! Two of their biggest matches ended in a no-contest. Then they nixed one of the more anticipated encounters a week before the event. Most of the action on this show was lackluster or downright bad. It wasn’t an impressive card, to begin with. This isn’t the worst show of the year, but it’s in the bottom three. 1998 started with such promise for WCW. It’s been downhill since Road Wild."

The event generated 250,000 ppv buys.

== Results ==
| No. | Results | Stipulations | Times |
|---|---|---|---|
| 1 | Wrath defeated Glacier | Singles match | 8:22 |
| 2 | Stevie Ray (with Vincent) defeated Konnan by disqualification | Singles match | 6:55 |
| 3 | Ernest Miller and Sonny Onoo defeated Perry Saturn and Kaz Hayashi | Tag team match | 8:04 |
| 4 | Billy Kidman defeated Juventud Guerrera (c) | Singles match for the WCW Cruiserweight Championship | 15:27 |
| 5 | Rick Steiner vs. Scott Steiner (with Buff Bagwell) ended in a no contest | Singles match | — |
| 6 | Chris Jericho (c) (with Ralphus) defeated Bobby Duncum Jr. | Singles match for the WCW World Television Championship | 13:22 |
| 7 | Kevin Nash won by last eliminating Lex Luger | 60-Man World War 3 match for a WCW World Heavyweight Championship match at Starrcade^{1} | 23:28 |
| 8 | Diamond Dallas Page (c) defeated Bret Hart | Singles match for the WCW United States Heavyweight Championship | 18:31 |
(c) / – the champion(s) heading into the match

^1Other participants were Chris Adams, Chris Benoit, Bobby Blaze, Ciclope, Damien, El Dandy, Barry Darsow, The Disciple, Disco Inferno, Bobby Duncum Jr., Bobby Eaton, Mike Enos, Scott Hall, Héctor Garza, The Giant, Glacier, Juventud Guerrera, Chavo Guerrero Jr., Eddy Guerrero, Hammer, Kenny Kaos, Kaz Hayashi, Horace Hogan, Barry Horowitz, Prince Iaukea, Chris Jericho, Kanyon, Billy Kidman, Konnan, Lenny Lane, Lex Luger, Lizmark Jr., Lodi, Dean Malenko, Steve McMichael, Ernest Miller, Chip Minton, Rey Misterio Jr., Scott Norton, La Parka, Sgt. Buddy Lee Parker, Psychosis, Scott Putski, Stevie Ray, The Renegade, Scotty Riggs, Perry Saturn, Silver King, Norman Smiley, Scott Steiner, Super Caló, Johnny Swinger, Booker T, Tokyo Magnum, Villano V, Vincent, Kendall Windham, Wrath and Alex Wright
