= The Magnificent Seven (professional wrestling) =

Professional wrestling stable

Stable
- Members: See below
- Name(s): The Elite; The Magnificent Seven
- Debut: January 14, 2001
- Disbanded: March 21, 2001

The Magnificent Seven was a villainous professional wrestling stable in World Championship Wrestling (WCW). It debuted on January 14, 2001, and disbanded on March 21, 2001.

The group was formed and led by the on-screen CEO of WCW Ric Flair. The group included WCW World Heavyweight Champion Scott Steiner and his valet, Midajah, his brother WCW United States Heavyweight Champion Rick Steiner, Jeff Jarrett, Lex Luger, Buff Bagwell and Road Warrior Animal.

== History ==
Flair and Luger had previously been stablemates in the Four Horsemen in 1987 and partners in a tag team called Team Package the previous year, while Jarrett was a former member of the Horsemen with Flair in 1997 and a former nWo 2000 member with Scott Steiner.

The group formed at the Sin pay-per-view on January 14, 2001. WCW World Heavyweight Champion Scott Steiner was defending his title in a four-way match that included Sid Vicious, Jarrett and an unnamed wrestler who didn't appear at the start of the match. Mid-way through the match, Flair revealed Road Warrior Animal as the mystery man and recruited Jarrett so Steiner could keep his title. The next night on Nitro, Flair revealed all of this as a plan, announcing the creation of the stable which he initially named "The Elite". That prompted The Insiders (Kevin Nash and Diamond Dallas Page) and Rick Steiner to come out and confront the group as Nash challenged Scott Steiner to a title match. WCW's Commissioner, Ernest Miller, came out and booked the title match, which ended in a disqualification as both sides interfered. On the following episode of Thunder, Miller booked Totally Buff (Lex Luger and Buff Bagwell) in a match against KroniK (Brian Adams and Bryan Clark), which the former won after Jarrett interfered. DDP came to help and Flair booked him and Jarrett to fight in the main event. That match ended in no contest as Nash, KroniK, Miller, Scott Steiner, Luger, Bagwell and Animal interfered. On a special Tuesday Nitro, Nash demanded a title shot against Steiner at SuperBrawl Revenge, which Flair agreed to if Nash defeated Bagwell that night. Miller booked a match between Luger and DDP, where the winner would ref the Nash-Bagwell match, and banned Bagwell and Nash from interfering in that match. Luger won the match after Jarrett hit DDP with a guitar. Nash won his match after DDP knocked Luger out and counted the pin with Luger's hand, prompting a big brawl in the ring. The next edition of Thunder, KroniK fought against Steiner and Animal and won. A brawl ensued after the match, while Nash and DDP were knocked out in their locker room after an attack earlier that night.

On the following episode of Nitro, Flair stripped Nash of his title shot due to him "laying down" at Thunder. Flair agreed to let Nash one more chance to get his title shot if he would have defeat Totally Buffed that night. That same night, Flair had Animal team with WCW Cruiserweight Champion Chavo Guerrero Jr. for his matches against other cruiserweights. Flair also signed Dustin Rhodes to a contract, and after he had Animal attacking Rhodes, until Dusty Rhodes came to his son's rescue. Jarrett and DDP fought and Jarrett won by a count out, and Nash defeated Totally Buff to get his title shot. The next edition of Thunder, Rick Steiner defeated Jarrett and Totally Buff defeated KroniK. On the next episode of Nitro, Nash choked Flair in order to make him put Miller in charge that night. Miller booked Steiner in a cruiserweight 4-on-1 handicap match (which Steiner won), against DDP (which DDP won) and against Nash and a mystery partner in a handicap match for the title. The Cat then added a stipulation where if Steiner lost his title, Flair would have to resign his post. Nash choose the new United States Heavyweight Champion Rick Steiner as his partner, only for Steiner to turn on him and join his brother. The next Thunder, Flair named his stable "The Magnificent Seven" for the first time. Brian Adams defeated Lex Luger, and the Insiders defeated the Steiner Brothers. On the February 12 episode of Nitro, Ric Flair suspended Dustin Rhodes and booked Miller against Lance Storm for the Commissionership where Storm won. However, Nash held David Flair hostage and blackmailed Ric into booking a rematch between Miller and Storm at SuperBrawl Revenge, and booking a match between Dustin Rhodes and Rick Steiner, where if Dustin would win, he would get reinstated and Nash would get a title shot against Steiner. Flair relented. Dustin won his match and Nash got his title shot. However, Steiner got disqualified after the Magnificent Seven interfered and attacked Nash with a lead pipe. This prompted DDP, Brian Adams, Hugh Morrus and Dustin Rhodes to attack the Steiners and Jarrett on Thunder, but it ended with Scott Steiner attacking a security man. At SuperBrawl Revenge, Rick Steiner defended his United States Heavyweight Championship against Dustin Rhodes, Totally Buff defeated KroniK to get a tag titles shot, Ernest Miller won his commissioner job back from Lance Storm, and DDP defeated Jarrett after he lost an impromptu match to Chris Kanyon before the match. Before the main event, Flair declared that the loser of the match would retire. Nash came in a wheelchair as Steiner taunted him, Nash revealed he wasn't really injured, hit Steiner with the belt and pinned him, seemingly winning the title. Flair turned the match into a two-out-of-three-falls match. Later, Steiner hit Nash with the lead pipe outside the ring as Flair made the match a falls count anywhere match and Steiner pinned Nash to tie the score. During the final fall, Midajah and Flair interfered, allowing Steiner to hit Nash with a steel chair, and winning the match with the Steiner Recliner, thus retiring Nash.

The next night on Nitro, the group did a funeral for Nash, and DDP challenged Steiner to a match at Greed. On the same night, Jarrett and Flair started a feud with the Rhodes Family with Jarrett imitating Dusty. DDP defeated Kanyon in order to get a title shot at Greed. The following week, Booker T made his return after being injured by Steiner to save DDP from the Steiner Brothers. During the next episode of Thunder, Booker T got Scott in a non-title match, only for Rick Steiner to interfere. On the March 5 episode of Nitro, Booker T challenged Rick to a United States Championship match, that was ended with an interference from both DDP and Scott; leading to a tag team main event match that ended with a beat-down by Scott on DDP. That same night, Jarrett defeated Dusty Rhodes and after a post-match beatdown, Flair and Jarrett challenged the Rhodes family to a tag match at Greed. On the March 12 episode of Nitro, Midajah was found knocked out in the backstage, and it was implied that Bagwell did it. During the next episode of Thunder, Bagwell found Animal knocked out in the backstage with a writing on the wall that said "It wasn't him". At Greed, Booker won the WCW United States Heavyweight Championship from Rick Steiner, Dusty Rhodes pinned Ric Flair in the tag match (and per match's stipulation, Flair had to kiss Rhodes' buttocks), and Steiner defeated DDP in a falls count anywhere match to retain his title. During that same night, Bagwell was found laid out backstage.

The next night on Nitro, Booker T confronted Scott Steiner, and by orders of Eric Bischoff, it was booked that the two would face each other next week in a title vs. title match. The same night, Luger was found laid out as well. At the end of that night, the Rhodes family managed to make Flair kiss a donkey's ass, which read "Dusty's ass". On the next episode of Thunder, Flair booked Dustin against both Scott and Jarrett, where Steiner won with his lead pipe only for Booker T to make the save. Before the match, Flair was found laid out in his locker room. However, the storyline was aborted after Vince McMahon purchased WCW.

The group broke up before the final episode of Nitro, where Booker T won the WCW World Heavyweight Championship from Steiner.

== Members ==
- Ric Flair (leader)
- Jeff Jarrett
- Scott Steiner
- Rick Steiner
- Lex Luger
- Buff Bagwell
- Road Warrior Animal
- Midajah (valet)

== Championships and accomplishments ==
- WCW World Heavyweight Championship (1 time) – Scott Steiner
- WCW United States Heavyweight Championship (1 time) – Rick Steiner

== See also ==
- The Four Horsemen
