= World War 3 (1997) =

1997 World Championship Wrestling pay-per-view event

- Promotional poster featuring various wrestlers
- Promotion: World Championship Wrestling
- Date: November 23, 1997
- City: Auburn Hills, Michigan
- Venue: The Palace of Auburn Hills
- Attendance: 17,128
- Buy rate: 205,000
- Tagline: 60 Warriors. 3 Rings. 1 Survivor. You Do The Math.

Pay-per-view chronology
← Previous; Halloween Havoc	Next → Starrcade

World War 3 chronology
← Previous; 1996	Next → 1998

The 1997 World War 3 was the third World War 3 professional wrestling pay-per-view (PPV) event produced by World Championship Wrestling (WCW). The event took place on November 23, 1997 from The Palace of Auburn Hills in Auburn Hills, Michigan.

Nine matches were contested at the event. The main event was the traditional World War 3 battle royal, in which the winner would receive a future title shot at the WCW World Heavyweight Championship. Scott Hall won by last eliminating The Giant. WCW World Heavyweight Champion Hollywood Hogan was also a participant in the match, who joined the match for himself to prevent anyone from getting the title shot. Hall won after Kevin Nash, in a Sting disguise, attacked Giant with a baseball bat and eliminated him and after Hogan eliminated himself by running away from "Sting". Hall was entitled to receive his title shot at SuperBrawl VIII, but Hogan controversially lost the title to Sting at Starrcade. This resulted in the title being vacated and the two competing in a rematch at SuperBrawl VIII, where Sting won the title. Hall received his title shot at Uncensored in March, where Sting defeated him.

Another important match on the card was Curt Hennig versus Ric Flair in a no disqualification match for the WCW United States Heavyweight Championship. Hennig won the match to retain the title.

== Storylines ==
The event featured wrestlers from pre-existing scripted feuds and storylines. Wrestlers portrayed villains, heroes, or less distinguishable characters in the scripted events that built tension and culminated in a wrestling match or series of matches.

Besides the main event, there were several other unresolved storylines entering this edition of World War 3. One involved the continued feud between Steve McMichael and his estranged wife Debra, which had originally involved Jeff Jarrett but had abruptly shifted after Jarrett left WCW the previous month. In a match pitting McMichael against Debra's new charge in Alex Wright, McMichael lost after Debra enlisted recent WCW debutee Goldberg to assist Wright, after which he was awarded the former Chicago Bear's Super Bowl XX championship ring. The two were signed for World War 3, with the winner receiving possession of the ring.

Raven had been feuding with former American Males member Scotty Riggs for several weeks, trying to get him to join with his Flock. Raven had even gone as far as to injure Riggs during a match where he executed a drop toehold on Riggs, causing him to fall face first into an open steel chair and injure his eye, forcing him to wear an eye patch to cover the injury.

Ric Flair and Curt Hennig's rivalry began due to Hennig's actions at Fall Brawl during the WarGames match, where Hennig betrayed the Four Horsemen and joined up with the New World Order. In the climax of the match, Hennig placed Flair's head in between the cage door and the structure itself and slammed the door, causing Flair to miss several weeks. At Halloween Havoc, Flair returned to challenge Hennig for the WCW United States Championship, which Hennig had taken from McMichael the night after Fall Brawl; Flair lost by disqualification after attacking the champion using the title belt.

== Event ==
=== Preliminary matches ===
Other on-screen personnel
Role:	Name:
Commentators	Tony Schiavone
Commentators	Bobby Heenan
Commentators	Mike Tenay
Interviewer	Gene Okerlund
Ring announcers	Michael Buffer
Ring announcers	David Penzer
Referees	Mark Curtis
Referees	Mickie Jay
Referees	Nick Patrick
Referees	Charles Robinson

If Último Dragón had won his match against Yuji Nagata, he would have gotten 5 minutes alone in the ring with Sonny Onoo.

In the match between Raven and Scotty Riggs, he performed three Evenflow DDTs on Riggs and won after Riggs could not answer a ten count. After the match Riggs was carried out of the ring by members of The Flock, marking his entry into the group.

The match between Goldberg and McMichael never took place. Instead, McMichael struck Goldberg with a lead pipe backstage, knocking him unconscious, and took back his Super Bowl ring. He then came to the ring and demanded a new opponent. Debra brought Alex Wright, who protested the whole way, out to the ring to take Goldberg's place.

=== Main event match ===
The main event was the World War 3 battle royal, which started with 59 out of 60 wrestlers in the ring. After every wrestler except Scott Hall, Diamond Dallas Page, and The Giant had been eliminated, Hollywood Hogan revealed that he was the final entrant in Word War 3; he did this to ensure that, as the reigning WCW World Champion, that nobody else would receive a shot at the title if he won.

Shortly after Hogan came to the ring, Kevin Nash wearing a Sting mask entered the scene, causing Hogan to flee and eliminate himself. Nash then struck Giant with a baseball bat, all while still wearing the mask, and Hall eliminated him to win the match and the title shot while the ruse was revealed.

== Aftermath ==
As the prematch stipulation of the World War 3 dictated, Hall was to receive his championship match at SuperBrawl VIII; due to a chain of events that followed World War 3, Hall did not receive this shot until Uncensored in March 1998.

== Reception ==
In 2016, Kevin Pantoja of 411Mania gave the event a rating of 4.5 [Poor], stating, "Honestly, I expected a lot worse. The World War 3 match itself is the usual lackluster event, the TV Title was lame and the Mongo stuff completely sucked ass. However, I think that Eddie and Rey had a pretty good match, while Hennig and Flair surprised me with a good old fashioned fight. Even the opener was surprising fun. The rest of the card ranged from decent to solid, meaning I wouldn’t call this a bad show, but I wouldn’t consider it a recommendation either. See the US and Cruiserweight Title matches if you have to see anything."

== Results ==
No.	Results	Stipulations	Times
1	The Faces of Fear (Meng and The Barbarian) (with Jimmy Hart) defeated Glacier and Ernest Miller	Tag team match	09:09
2	Saturn (c) defeated Disco Inferno	Singles match for the WCW World Television Championship	08:19
3	Yuji Nagata (with Sonny Onoo) defeated Último Dragón	Singles match	12:45
4	The Steiner Brothers (Rick and Scott) (c) (with Ted DiBiase) defeated The Blue Bloods (Lord Steven Regal and Squire David Taylor)	Tag team match for the WCW World Tag Team Championship	09:45
5	Raven (with Lodi, Kidman, Saturn, and Hammer) defeated Scotty Riggs	Raven's Rules match	09:43
6	Steve McMichael defeated Alex Wright	Singles match	03:36
7	Eddie Guerrero (c) defeated Rey Misterio Jr.	Singles match for the WCW Cruiserweight Championship	12:42
8	Curt Hennig (c) defeated Ric Flair	No Disqualification match for the WCW United States Heavyweight Championship	17:57
9	Scott Hall won by last eliminating The Giant	60-Man World War 3 for a future WCW World Heavyweight Championship match^{1}	30:48
(c) / – the champion(s) heading into the match

^1The other competitors were Chris Adams, Brad Armstrong, Buff Bagwell, The Barbarian, Chris Benoit, Bobby Blaze, Booker T, Ciclope, Damien, El Dandy, Barry Darsow, Disco Inferno, Jim Duggan, Fit Finlay, Héctor Garza, Glacier, Johnny Grunge, Juventud Guerrera, Chavo Guerrero Jr., Eddie Guerrero, Curt Hennig, Prince Iaukea, Chris Jericho, Lizmark Jr., Lex Luger, Dean Malenko, Steve McMichael, Meng, Ernest Miller, Rey Misterio Jr., Hugh Morrus, Mortis, Yuji Nagata, John Nord, Diamond Dallas Page, La Parka, Lord Steven Regal, The Renegade, Rocco Rock, Randy Savage, Silver King, Norman Smiley, Louie Spicolli, Rick Steiner, Scott Steiner, Stevie Ray, Super Caló, Squire David Taylor, Ray Traylor, Último Dragón, Greg Valentine, Villano IV, Villano V, Vincent, Kendall Windham, Wrath, Alex Wright and Hollywood Hogan^{2}
^2Hogan was the reigning WCW World Heavyweight Champion at the time but entered the match to prevent anyone from getting a shot at his title.
