= Tom Fleming (artist) =

American comic book artist (born 1966)

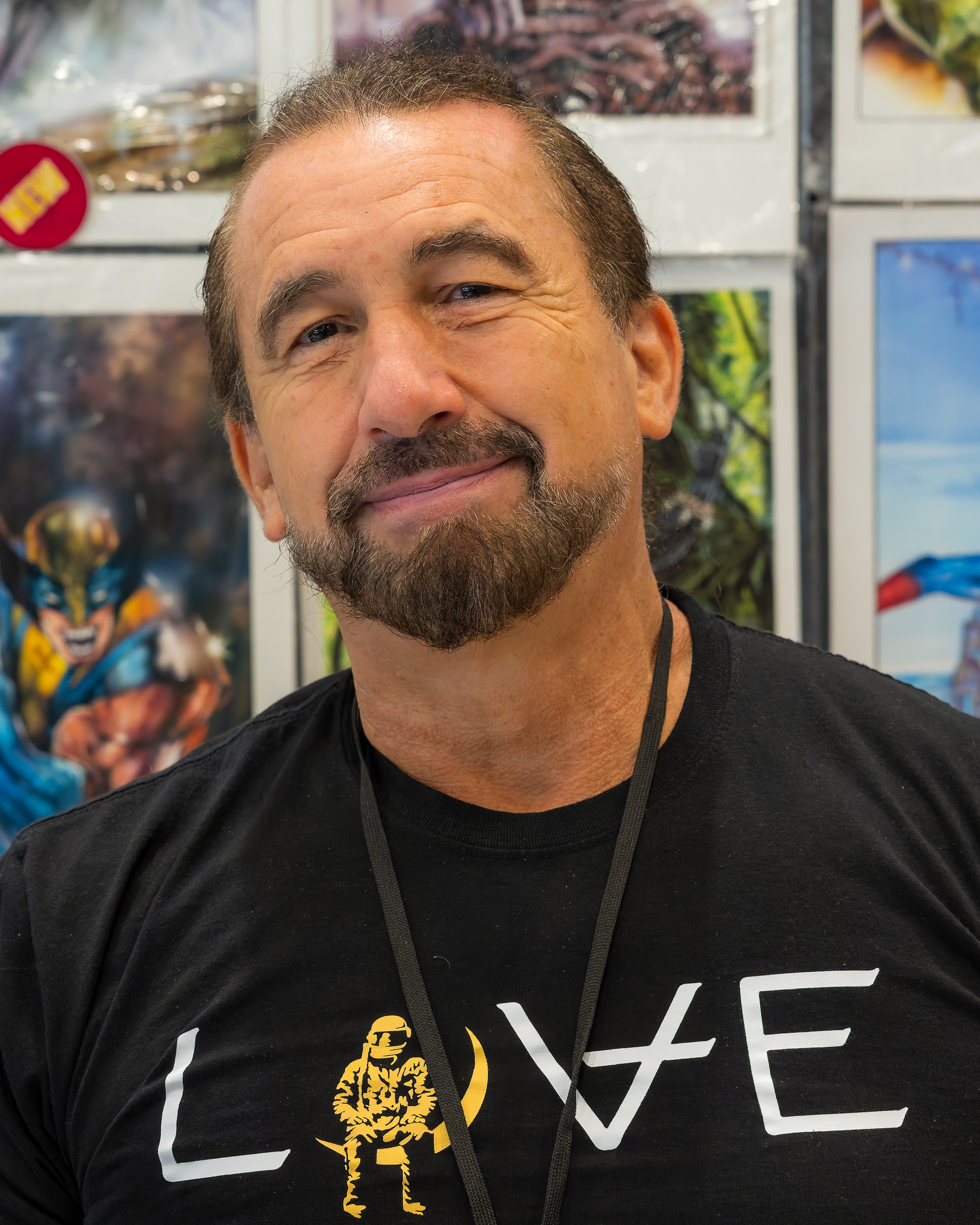
- Fleming in 2026
- Born: June 11, 1966 (age 60); Mount Kisco, New York
- Education: Syracuse University (BFA)
- Occupation: Artist

Thomas Fleming (born June 11, 1966) is an artist who has worked on comic books, the fantasy/science fiction genre, and gaming. Fleming has been recognized with multiple awards throughout his career including four nominations for the Chesley Award. In 2012, a federal court awarded him damages due by HomeGoods, which sold unauthorized reproductions of two of his paintings.

== Early life ==
Born and raised in Putnam Valley, New York, Fleming knew he wanted to be an artist at a young age. Fleming's high school art teacher Jay Palefsky played a crucial role in his early development as an artist, introducing him to more advanced and unconventional artistic concepts. He is a graduate of Syracuse University. There, he earned a BFA and graduated at the top of his class in 1988.

== Career ==
Fleming's professional career began with freelance work from Alfred Hitchcock's Mystery Magazine upon graduation doing black and white illustrations.

In 1991 Fleming landed a full-time position at WWE (known at the time as the WWF) as a costume designer, logo designer, prop creator, and Illustrator. Fleming's artwork for WWE appeared on Wrestlemania T-shirts, VHS covers, and other merchandise items. Fleming made his first impact on pop culture by creating and designing characters for the WWE including Papa Shango, Crush, Adam Bomb, 1-2-3 Kid, and Hall of Famer Razor Ramon. Fleming also designed and created the scepter for the first pay-per-view King of the Ring event in 1993.

Fleming returned to freelance in the mid-1990s and has painted trading cards, comic book covers, paperback covers, magazine covers, and posters for companies such as Marvel Comics, DC Comics, Heavy Metal Magazine, Image Comics, Dark Horse Comics, World of Warcraft, Magic the Gathering, White Wolf Publishing, Cracked magazine, and others.

Fleming was chosen by Skybox/DC Comics to paint the "Doomsday" and "Funeral for a Friend" trading card during the legendary "Death of Superman" story line in the 1990s. He produced covers for Marvel featuring Elektra.

Fleming is known for Art Nouveau drawings and paintings that have won awards and Chesley Award nominations.

Fleming is the author of Draw & Paint Fantasy Females, published by Impact, an imprint of F+W. It has been translated in three languages (Chinese, Spanish, and German).

Fleming also has done artwork for the film and television industry including: "Stay Alive" starring Frankie Muniz, "Stateside (film)" starring Val Kilmer, "Surface", and "Life". Fleming was also official artist for the 2002 film The Dangerous Lives of Altar Boys.

=== HomeGoods lawsuit ===
In 2010, Fleming, who lives in North Carolina, discovered that HomeGoods stores in California were selling unauthorized full-size reproductions of two of his six-foot tall pieces. HomeGoods had paid ATI Industries, a painting reproductions wholesaler, $45 each for 120 pieces, which it then sold for $99 each in its stores. In 2012, in the outcome of a non-jury trial, a federal judge found HomeGoods and co-defendant ATI Industries liable for copyright infringement, with an award set at $10,800. Fleming later settled for an undisclosed amount.

== Awards and recognition ==
- 2006 DragonCon Art Show:
  - Artist Choice Award: "Golden Moon"
  - Best 2-D: "Spring"
- 2007 Chesley Awards: Nomination for Monochrome Work, Unpublished: "Spring"
- 2007 DragonCon Art Show: Best 2-D Piece: "Eve"
- 2008 Chesley Awards:
  - Nomination for Monochrome Work, Unpublished: "Summer" (pencil)
  - Nomination for Color Work, Unpublished: "Spirit & Life" (watercolor)
- 2008 DragonCon Art Show: Second Place: "Summer"
- 2009 Chesley Awards: Nomination for Gaming-related Illustration: "Firestorm"
- 2009 DragonCon Art Show:
  - Artist Choice Award: "Reverie"
  - Best Black & White: "Summer"
- 2010 Artexpo Artist Challenge: Top 10 Finalist: "Spirit & Life"
- 2014 Infected by Art Season 2 competition
  - 1st Place - Grand Prize Winner (Internet voting prize): "Ophelia"
  - 2nd Place - Grand Prize Winner (Internet voting prize): "Soul Harvest"
- Spectrum 5: The Best in Contemporary Fantastic Art Annual, 1998 Spectrum Design, Underwood Books pg. 151 #4
- Spectrum 20: The Best in Contemporary Fantastic Art Annual, 2013 Spectrum Design, Underwood Books pg. 183
