= WCW World War 3 =

World Championship Wrestling pay-per-view event series

World War 3
- Promotions: World Championship Wrestling
- First event: World War 3 (1995)
- Last event: World War 3 (1998)
- Signature matches: World War 3 match

World War 3 was an annual professional wrestling pay-per-view event produced by World Championship Wrestling (WCW). The pay-per-view's title was also the name of its signature match, a three-ring, sixty-man battle royal. The event took place every November from 1995 until 1998. Like the Royal Rumble, the World War 3 match was held at the event that shared its name. The first two World War 3 events were held at the Norfolk Scope and the last two were held at the Palace of Auburn Hills. In 1999, it was replaced by Mayhem.

WWE owns the rights to World War 3 since the sale of WCW and its trademarks in 2001. In February 2021, all WCW pay-per-views were made available on the WWE Network.

== Rules ==
The rules for a World War 3 match were similar to the rules for a traditional battle royal match:

- All sixty men were randomly assigned a specific ring before the match began.
- The match began with all sixty men, in three rings, when the bell rings. Each ring was assigned a number. From left to right on the TV screen ring #1 was on the left, ring #2 was the center ring and ring #3 was on the right.
  - Originally, to be eliminated from the match, a wrestler had to be thrown over the top rope and have both feet touch the floor. This rule was amended in 1997 to allow for eliminations if a person leaves the ring in any way. In 1998, the rule was amended again to allow the counting of pinfalls and submissions for eliminations.
- When 10 men remained in ring #1 or ring #3 they moved to ring #2 and the match continued.
  - This rule was amended in 1997 so that the competitors had to move to the central ring once forty men had been eliminated.
- The last man standing in the ring was declared the winner.

The inaugural World War 3 match was contested for the WCW World Heavyweight Championship, which had been stripped from The Giant due to the outcome of his match with Hulk Hogan at Halloween Havoc in October 1995. In subsequent years the winner of the match became the #1 contender to the World Heavyweight Championship. Initially the winner got to pick which pay-per-view he would face the champion at, but this changed for the 1997 and 1998 matches to a set pay-per-view.

== Dates, venues, winners, and main events ==
WCW/nWo co-branded event

Event	Date	City	Venue	Winner	Prize	Main event(s)
World War 3 (1995)	November 26, 1995	Norfolk, Virginia	Norfolk Scope	Randy Savage	Vacant WCW World Heavyweight Championship	60-Man World War 3 match for the vacant WCW World Heavyweight Championship
World War 3 (1996)	November 24, 1996	Norfolk, Virginia	Norfolk Scope	The Giant	WCW World Heavyweight Championship match at Souled Out 1997	60-man World War 3 match
World War 3 (1997)	November 23, 1997	Auburn Hills, Michigan	The Palace of Auburn Hills	Scott Hall	WCW World Heavyweight Championship match at Uncensored 1998*	60-man World War 3 match
World War 3 (1998)	November 22, 1998	Auburn Hills, Michigan	The Palace of Auburn Hills	Kevin Nash	WCW World Heavyweight Championship match at Starrcade 1998	Diamond Dallas Page (c) vs. Bret Hart for the WCW United States Heavyweight Championship
(c) – refers to the champion(s) heading into the match

*The winner of World War 3 in 1997 was supposed to receive his title shot at SuperBrawl in February of 1998, but due to circumstances surrounding the finish of the main event of Starrcade the following month, the title was vacated and a match to fill the vacancy was contested at SuperBrawl with Hall to face the winner at Uncensored.

=== Championship match for winner ===
– Championship victory
– Championship match loss

#	Winner	Event	Year	Championship match
1	The Giant	Souled Out (1997)	1996	Giant received his title shot against Hollywood Hogan at Souled Out, where Hogan retained the WCW World Heavyweight Championship after the match ended in a no contest.
2	Scott Hall	Uncensored (1998)	1997	Hall lost to Sting for the WCW World Heavyweight Championship.
3	Kevin Nash	Starrcade (1998)	1998	Nash defeated Goldberg for the WCW World Heavyweight Championship.

== Offshoots ==
On the July 1, 2022 episode of AEW Rampage, All Elite Wrestling held its first Royal Rampage match, which would include a battle royal involving more than one ring, in this case two rings, and 20 competitors, with the winner becoming number one contender for the AEW World Heavyweight Championship.
