= Starrcade (1998) =

1998 World Championship Wrestling pay-per-view event

- Promotional poster featuring Goldberg
- Promotion: World Championship Wrestling
- Brand(s): WCW nWo
- Date: December 27, 1998
- City: Washington, D.C.
- Venue: MCI Center
- Attendance: 16,066
- Buy rate: 460,000
- Tagline: Who's Next? The Challenge Has Been Issued.

Pay-per-view chronology
← Previous; World War 3	Next → Souled Out

Starrcade chronology
← Previous; 1997	Next → 1999

The 1998 Starrcade was the 16th annual Starrcade professional wrestling pay-per-view (PPV) event produced by World Championship Wrestling (WCW). It took place on December 27, 1998, from the MCI Center in Washington, D.C.

The main event was a no-disqualification match between Goldberg and Kevin Nash for the WCW World Heavyweight Championship. Their feud began when Nash won a battle royal at World War 3, and earned a title match. Other matches included Diamond Dallas Page against The Giant, Eric Bischoff against Ric Flair, and Konnan against Chris Jericho for the WCW World Television Championship. The event generated 460,000 ppv buys.

== Storylines ==
The event featured wrestlers from pre-existing feuds and storylines. Wrestlers portrayed villains, heroes, or less distinguishable characters in the scripted events that built tension and culminated in a wrestling match or series of matches.

The main feud heading into Starrcade was between Goldberg and Kevin Nash over the WCW World Heavyweight Championship. Since his debut, Goldberg started an undefeated streak, and won the title from Hollywood Hogan on the July 6 edition of Nitro. At World War 3, Nash won a battle royal to earn a title match with Goldberg at Starrcade, and their feud began. Heading into Starrcade, Goldberg had an undefeated streak of 173 matches.

The feud between Ric Flair and Eric Bischoff began on September 14, when Flair returned to reform the Four Horsemen. The Four Horsemen feuded with the New World Order, but it soon reduced to a feud between Flair and Bischoff. The feud between Diamond Dallas Page and The Giant began when Bret Hart defeated Page with the help of The Giant to win the WCW United States Heavyweight Championship on the November 30 edition of Nitro.

== Event ==
Goldberg, the WCW World Heavyweight Champion, before his match at Starrcade

The first match was a triangle match between Juventud Guerrera, Rey Mysterio, Jr., and Billy Kidman for the WCW Cruiserweight Championship. The match went back and forth between all three. It ended when Mysterio sent Guerrera outside the ring with a headscissors takedown, and Kidman performed a shooting star press to both. Eddy Guerrero came out as Kidman fought Guerrera in the ring. Kidman had Guerrera in a roll-up, and Guerrero reversed it into a sunset flip on Kidman. Mysterio dropkicked Guerrera, and Kidman pinned Guerrera with a roll-up to win the match, and retain the title.

After the match, Guerrero lectured Mysterio and Guerrera, and challenged Kidman for the title. Kidman accepted, and the match started with Guerrero having the advantage. Kidman fought back with a headscissors takedown, and they went back and forth. After Kidman countered a powerbomb into a sitout facebuster, he attempted a Frankensteiner, but Guerrero held on. After interference from Guerrera and Mysterio, who helped Guerrero and Kidman respectively, Kidman pinned Guerrero after a shooting star press to win the match, and retain the title.

The third match was between Norman Smiley and Prince Iaukea. The match started back and forth until Smiley dropped Iaukea across the ropes. Smiley dominated Iaukea with the use of many holds. Iaukea attempted to fight back with a springboard crossbody, but Smiley rolled through, and forced Iaukea to submit with the Norman Conquest. Smiley won the match.

The fourth match was between Ernest Miller (accompanied by Sonny Onoo) and Perry Saturn. The match started back and forth. Saturn had the early advantage until Miller performed an eye rake, and choked Saturn. Miller performed a superkick, but Saturn fought back with suplexes. After Saturn missed an axe handle, Miller fought back with kicks, and held Saturn for Onoo to attack him. Onoo accidentally kicked Miller, and Miller kicked Onoo. Saturn then pinned Miller after a Death Valley driver to win the match.

Other on-screen personnel
Role:	Name:
Commentators	Tony Schiavone
Commentators	Bobby Heenan
Commentators	Mike Tenay
Interviewer	Gene Okerlund
Referees	Scott Dickinson
Referees	Mickie Jay
Referees	Charles Robinson
Referees	Billy Silverman
Ring announcer	Michael Buffer
Ring announcer	David Penzer

The fifth match was between the team of Brian Adams and Scott Norton and the team of Fit Finlay and Jerry Flynn. The match went back and forth until Adams performed a piledriver to Finlay. Adams and Norton dominated Finlay with a DDT and a hangman's neckbreaker from Norton. Finlay performed a jawbreaker to Adams, but Adams fought back with a gorilla press gutbuster. Flynn tagged in after Finlay blocked a seated senton from Adams. Norton pinned Flynn after a clothesline and a powerbomb to win the match.

The sixth match was between Chris Jericho and Konnan for the WCW World Television Championship. Jericho gained the advantage after sending Konnan into the ringpost. Konnan fought back with a rolling thunder lariat, and they went back and forth. Jericho performed a Lionsault, but sent himself into the ringsteps. After Konnan kicked him in the corner, Jericho hit Konnan with the belt. Konnan fought back with a Facejam, and forced Jericho to submit with the Tequila Sunrise. Konnan won the match, and retained the title.

The seventh match was between Eric Bischoff and Ric Flair. The match started with Flair dominating Bischoff with knife edge chops, punches, and kicks. Flair performed a knee drop, and targeted Bischoff's right leg. Bischoff fought back briefly with kicks. Flair performed repeated low blows and knife edge chops. Flair knocked down the referee, and performed suplexes before applying the figure four leglock. Curt Hennig came down and handed Bischoff a weapon. Bischoff punched Flair with it, and pinned him to win the match.

The eighth match was between The Giant and Diamond Dallas Page. The Giant dominated Page after sending him into the ringsteps and ringposts. After delivering several attacks, The Giant applied the bear hug. Page fought out, and bit The Giant's forehead, but The Giant performed a chokeslam backbreaker. Page performed a tornado DDT, and both were down. Bret Hart came out, and accidentally hit The Giant with a steel chair. Page performed flying clotheslines until The Giant caught him, and attempted a chokeslam from the top turnbuckle. Page countered it into a Diamond Cutter, and pinned The Giant to win the match.

Kevin Nash, after winning the WCW World Heavyweight Championship at Starrcade

The main event was a No Disqualification match between Kevin Nash and Goldberg for the WCW World Heavyweight Championship. Michael Buffer did the introductions for the bout and incorrectly announced Goldberg as having a 174–0 record despite it being 173–0. The match started back and forth. Nash attacked Goldberg in the corner, but Goldberg pushed him down, and applied the ankle lock. Goldberg attacked Nash in the corner, but Nash sent him into the turnbuckle. Nash performed a corner foot choke, and attempted a big boot. Goldberg ducked, and performed a spear. As Goldberg was about to perform a Jackhammer, Nash performed a low blow. Nash performed a sidewalk slam, and attacked Goldberg's back. Goldberg fought back with a swinging neckbreaker and a superkick. After Goldberg performed a front powerslam and a spinning heel kick, Disco Inferno and Bam Bam Bigelow came out to attack Goldberg. Goldberg performed a spear to Inferno, and sent Bigelow out of the ring with a clothesline. As Goldberg was about to perform a spear to Nash, Scott Hall shocked Goldberg with a stun gun. Nash performed a Jackknife Powerbomb to Goldberg, and pinned him to win the match and the title, and thus ending Goldberg's streak 173–1.

== Aftermath ==
Goldberg's defeat at Starrcade marked the end of his undefeated streak. On the January 4 episode of Nitro, Kevin Nash was scheduled to face Goldberg in a rematch for the WCW World Heavyweight Championship. Goldberg was arrested, however, when he was falsely accused of stalking Miss Elizabeth. Instead, Nash faced Hollywood Hogan, who had returned after a hiatus, purportedly to announce his retirement in the wake of his run for President of the United States, and offered to face Nash in place of Goldberg. Nash would lie down and allow Hogan to pin him, effectively handing the title to Hogan, in an incident infamously known as the "Fingerpoke of Doom". The match was followed by a reunion of the New World Order (nWo), revealing that Nash's victories at World War 3 and Starrcade had been part of a conspiracy to get the title back on Hogan.

After Starrcade, Goldberg feuded with Scott Hall due to his interference in the match. They faced each other in a ladder match involving a stun gun at Souled Out. After Goldberg won the match, Bam Bam Bigelow came out and attacked Goldberg, and a feud started between them. It led to their match at SuperBrawl IX, where Goldberg defeated Bigelow to end their feud. The feud between Ric Flair and Eric Bischoff continued, with Hogan eventually becoming a part of the rivalry as well. The entire feud, which led to Flair gaining control of WCW for ninety days following a win the night after Starrcade, culminated with Flair's defeat of Hogan at Uncensored in March to take Hogan's championship and the presidency of WCW from Bischoff permanently. Flair would eventually lose both the World Heavyweight Championship (at Spring Stampede) and the WCW Presidency, the latter thanks to a returning Bischoff who had disappeared from television shortly after the Hogan-Flair match at Uncensored.

== Reception ==
The event has received generally negative or mixed reviews from critics.

In 2013, Dylan Diot of 411Mania gave the event a rating of "5.0 [Not So Good]," stating, "This did not feel like the biggest show of the year for WCW. Too many pointless matches and a mostly dead crowd made for a dull show. There was also the lack of major star power, with no Sting, Luger, Hogan, or Savage competing. This was a sign of the times for WCW, with horrible booking and too much interference preventing the show from producing memorable moments and satisfying conclusions for the fans. The only things I can recommend are the opening three way and the main event for historical purposes but otherwise you can skip this."

In 2021, Lance Augustine of TJR Wrestling gave the event a rating of "5 out of 10," stating, "I might be a little generous with that rating, but the opening matches with Kidman were both solid, and Goldberg suffering his first loss is a big deal. The rest of the show was so average with guys that weren’t normally featured in big spots. This was WrestleMania for WCW, and most of the matches fell really flat. I didn’t even think Page and The Giant had an outstanding match but both were capable of doing so. The fans were so dead throughout the whole show and only came up when the main event was going on."

In 2023, Michael Fitzgerald of Scott's Blog of Doom! gave the event a review of "Not a recommended show," stating, "The two Cruiserweight matches and the Main Event were strong ways to bookend the show, and I found most of the actual wrestling in the under card to be decent for the most part, so I think I’d give Starrcade 1998 at worst a thumbs in the middle, and possibly even a mild thumbs up. I wouldn’t really recommend you going out of your way to watch anything on it past the first two matches, but those first two matches are great and definitely worth checking out. I can’t recommend the show as a whole though."

== Results ==
No.	Results	Stipulations	Times
1	Billy Kidman (c) defeated Rey Mysterio Jr. and Juventud Guerrera	Triangle match for the WCW Cruiserweight Championship	14:56
2	Billy Kidman (c) defeated Eddie Guerrero	Singles match for the WCW Cruiserweight Championship	10:48
3	Norman Smiley defeated Prince Iaukea	Singles match	11:31
4	Perry Saturn defeated Ernest Miller (with Sonny Onoo)	Singles match	7:07
5	Brian Adams and Scott Norton (with Vincent) defeated Fit Finlay and Jerry Flynn	Tag team match	8:56
6	Konnan (c) defeated Chris Jericho (with Ralphus)	Singles match for the WCW World Television Championship	7:28
7	Eric Bischoff defeated Ric Flair	Singles match	7:08
8	Diamond Dallas Page defeated The Giant	Singles match	12:45
9	Kevin Nash defeated Goldberg (c)	No Disqualification match for the WCW World Heavyweight Championship	11:20
(c) / – the champion(s) heading into the match
