= Brian Adams (wrestler) =

American professional wrestler (1964–2007)

- Adams in 2002

Personal information
- Born: Brian Keith Adams; April 14, 1964 Kona, Hawaii, U.S.
- Died: August 13, 2007 (aged 43) Tampa, Florida, U.S.

Professional wrestling career
- Ring name(s): The American Ninja; Brian Adams; Crush; The Demon; Kona Crush; The Midnight Soldier
- Billed height: 6 ft 6 in (198 cm)
- Billed weight: 315 lb (143 kg)
- Billed from: Kona, Hawaii
- Trained by: Antonio Inoki; Tatsumi Fujinami
- Debut: 1986
- Retired: January 2003
- Military service
- Allegiance: United States
- Branch: United States Air Force

Brian Keith Adams (April 14, 1964 – August 13, 2007) was an American professional wrestler. Adams is known for his time with the World Wrestling Federation (WWF), under the name Crush, and for World Championship Wrestling (WCW) under his real name Brian Adams. Trained in Japan by Antonio Inoki, he was a two-time WCW World Tag Team Champion, a one-time WWF Tag Team Champion and a one-time AJPW World Tag Team Champion, among other accomplishments. He was a challenger for various singles titles in the WWF and WCW, including the WWF Championship. In 2002, he briefly tried a career in boxing until retiring due to back and shoulder injuries.

== Early life ==
Brian Adams was born in Kona, Hawaii, and was raised in Kealakekua, Hawaii. He attended Konawaena High School. After graduating from high school, Adams joined the US Air Force, where he began boxing. It was during his time in the USAF, while stationed in Japan, that he was also exposed to wrestling. Adams was trained in wrestling by famed Japanese wrestler and mixed martial artist Antonio Inoki.

== Professional wrestling career ==
=== New Japan Pro-Wrestling (1986–1987) ===
Brian Adams made his debut for New Japan Pro-Wrestling in 1986. However, his work visa expired after a tour in September 1987, forcing him to return to the United States.

=== Pacific Northwest Wrestling and return to NJPW (1987–1988) ===
In November 1987, Adams joined the NWA Pacific Northwest Wrestling (PNW) promotion, where he was given the nickname "the American Ninja". Upon arrival, he feuded with Super Ninja, which culminated in a loser-leaves-town match, which Adams won. Adams left PNW in February 1988 to return to NJPW for a tour, this time under the masked persona, The Midnight Soldier. The NJPW tour lasted from February 29 to March 19.

=== Continental Wrestling Association and All Japan Pro Wrestling (1988–1989) ===
Upon returning to Portland, he did not return to PNW, but instead joined Billy Jack Haynes' short-lived Oregon Wrestling Federation. After OWF quickly folded, Adams wrestled throughout the independent circuit in Portland, until November 1988, when he joined Mike Miller in Memphis, to wrestle for Continental Wrestling Association. Later that same month, he wrestled a match for World Championship Wrestling teaming with Jerry Price losing to Lex Luger and Sting. In January 1989, Adams and Miller went to wrestle a tour for All Japan Pro Wrestling. The AJPW tour lasted from January 2 to 28.

=== Return to PNW (1989–1990) ===
In March 1989, Adams finally returned to PNW, where he aligned with Lord Jonathan Boyd and Carl Styles, feuding with The Grappler, The Barbarian, and Buddy Rose. In April 1989, Adams revived the masked Midnight Soldier persona, which led to The Grappler to offer a $5000 bounty for the mask. In September 1989, Adams unmasked and turned heel, and joined forces with The Grappler in a tag team called "The Wrecking Crew". Adams and Grappler were the Pacific Northwest Tag Team Champions for a time and worked a feud with the Southern Rockers, Steve Doll and Rex King. In May 1988, he took part in Billy Jack Haynes' short-lived Oregon Wrestling Federation. In 1990, he won the Pacific Northwest Heavyweight Championship after winning a tournament final match against Larry Oliver in Portland on April 21, 1990, for the vacant title. He lost the title to Scott Norton on May 12, 1990, in Portland.

=== World Wrestling Federation (1989, 1990–1991) ===
Adams appeared in a dark match on August 9, 1989, defeating Barry Horowitz on WWF Wrestling Challenge.

In June 1990, while still working for the PNW, Adams debuted in the World Wrestling Federation (WWF) as "Crush", the third member of the Tag Team Champions Demolition. With Adams joining Demolition, the trio exercised the Freebird Rule allowing any combination of the three to defend the tag team title, which allowed Crush to become a Tag Team Champion. He was brought in as a substitute for Ax to defend the titles with Smash. Crush debuted at a live event on June 5, where he and Smash successfully defended the titles against The Rockers. Crush made his televised debut with Demolition on the June 23 episode of Superstars, teaming with Smash in a quick victory over Paul Diamond and Joe Champ. On the July 28 episode of Saturday Night's Main Event XXVII, Crush and Smash retained the titles against The Rockers, after Ax (who was the illegal man) clotheslined and pinned Shawn Michaels. At the SummerSlam pay-per-view, Demolition lost the titles to The Hart Foundation in a two out of three falls match with Crush getting pinned for the final fall to lose the titles. After SummerSlam, Demolition shifted focus from the belts to their already incipient feud with The Legion of Doom, which had intensified after the latter team interfered in the title change match. Adams continued to perform as part of Demolition until after WrestleMania VII where he and Smash lost to Genichiro Tenryu and Koji Kitao. After that WrestleMania, in March 1991, the WWF decided to disband Demolition as a team, although Demolition continue to team until September of that year.

=== Second return to PNW (1991–1992) ===
Upon his departure from the WWF, Adams, who continued to use the Crush gimmick, returned to PNW. He quickly turned fan favorite upon his return and was portrayed as a dominant wrestler, winning both the Pacific Northwest Tag Team Championship and the Pacific Northwest Heavyweight Championship. Adams received the first of these two championships during this stint in the PNW while teaming with previous rival Steve Doll and defeating The Bruise Brothers for the Tag Team Championship on July 27, 1991, in Portland, Oregon. They remained the champions until September 1, 1991, when they lost the title to The Grappler and Don Harris. A little more than a month later, Adams received his second Pacific Northwest Heavyweight title, on October 12, 1991, in Portland after he defeated Rip Oliver via submission to the Full Nelson hold. Adams was the champion for just over three months, losing the title to Ron Harris at a show in Portland, on January 18, 1992.

=== Return to WWF ===
==== Kona Crush (1992–1993) ====
On the back of his success in PNW, Adams went back to work for the WWF in 1992, retaining the Crush name and still a fan favorite, but using a new character of an easygoing surfing Hawaiian who wore bright neon tights and utilized a new two-handed skull vice finisher called the Cranium Crunch. Crush made his televised debut in WWF as his new character on the May 9, 1992, episode of Superstars, defeating Kato. The two would continue to work at house shows that month. Crush made his first pay-per-view appearance under the gimmick with a win over Repo Man (Barry Darsow, who also played Crush's former Demolition partner, Smash) at SummerSlam. Crush then engaged in a feud with Doink the Clown, after he was attacked with a loaded prosthetic arm while confronting the clown about his cruel pranks on children at ringside, which caused Crush to miss the 1993 Royal Rumble. The feud culminated at WrestleMania IX, where Crush lost after a second, identical Doink appeared from underneath the ring and struck Crush with the prosthetic arm. At the first King of the Ring pay-per-view, Crush challenged Shawn Michaels for the Intercontinental Championship, but lost the match after a distraction by Doink.

On July 4, Crush injured his back in the Stars and Stripes Challenge trying to bodyslam the WWF Champion Yokozuna, who at the time had a billed weight of 580 lb (260 kg). The bodyslam challenge took place on the US Navy Aircraft carrier USS Intrepid. Crush, generally considered to have the best chance of those present, was the first wrestler to actually get Yokozuna off his feet, but his back gave out, forcing him to stop. Lex Luger won the challenge. On the July 12 episode of Monday Night Raw, Crush unsuccessfully challenged Yokozuna for the WWF Championship. After the match, Yokozuna sent a message to Luger by performing several Banzai Drops to Crush. This angle was used to write Crush off television to recover from his back injury; he returned that following October.

==== Alliance with Mr. Fuji and Tribal Crush (1993–1995) ====
Crush returned to WWF on the October 18, 1993 episode of Monday Night Raw and attacked his on-screen friend Randy Savage because Savage had encouraged him to enter the Body Slam Challenge and had failed to contact him during his recuperation. He lacerated Randy’s tongue by dropping him face first onto a guardrail. Crush then allied himself with Yokozuna and Mr. Fuji, becoming a villain. Gorilla Monsoon called the gimmick the 'Native Hawaiian'. The new Native Chief/Polynesian Warrior gimmick included: growing a goatee, using a new face paint design different from his Demolition character, and utilizing a darker color scheme with a mix of Polynesian Blood for his ring attire. He also was billed as being from Kona, Hawaii (Hometown), Polynesia, and sometimes Japan. At Survivor Series, Crush headlined the event as part of Foreign Fanatics (Yokozuna, Ludvig Borga and Quebecer Jacques) against All-Americans (Lex Luger, The Undertaker and The Steiner Brothers). This rivalry led to a falls count anywhere match against Savage at WrestleMania X, which he lost.

Crush would become a hired gun for his manager Mr. Fuji, helping Jeff Jarrett win a King of the Ring qualifying match against Lex Luger on the May 21 episode of Superstars by attacking Luger outside the ring, causing him to lose by count-out. In retaliation, Luger cost Crush a King of the Ring qualifying lumberjack match against Tatanka on the June 6 episode of Raw. As a result, the pair began a short program. During the rivalry, Crush formed a tag team with Fuji's client Yokozuna, challenging The Headshrinkers for the Tag Team Championship at King of the Ring. They lost the match after Luger distracted Crush. In mid-July 1994, Crush parted ways with Yokozuna and Mr. Fuji but continued his feud with Luger. Their rivalry culminated in a match on the August 21 episode of Sunday Night Slam, which Luger won after Ted DiBiase distracted Crush. Afterwards, Crush lost a series of non-televised matches to The Undertaker in Europe in early September, and then subsequently left the WWF.

In 1995, Crush returned to the WWF at Royal Rumble and took part in the Royal Rumble match as the 30th entrant. He played a large role near the end of the match by eliminating Billy Gunn, Bart Gunn, Adam Bomb, and Headshrinker Fatu. Crush was one of the final four wrestlers in the ring alongside Lex Luger, Shawn Michaels and British Bulldog. After eliminating Luger via Michaels' aid, he tried to hit his body press slam on Shawn. However, Michaels raked his eyes and the Bulldog clotheslined him out of the ring. The Royal Rumble was the only wrestling appearance for Adams in 1995 for the WWF. On March 13, while home in Hawaii, he was arrested and subsequently jailed for purchasing steroids and possessing an illegal hand gun. Following this, Todd Pettengill announced on the March 25, 1995, episode of WWF Mania that Crush was arrested and fired (a public termination from WWF)

==== Nation of Domination and Disciples of Apocalypse (1996–1997) ====
After a brief stint in jail, Adams was brought back to the WWF in July 1996 with a new biker look with denim clothing and a nose piercing chain at the beginning of the Monday Night War, with his real-life incarceration being referenced as part of a storyline on Raw. To play along with the storyline, the fans would chant "jailbird" during his matches. He made his surprise return to WWF on the August 12, 1996, episode of Monday Night Raw, with Clarence Mason, his (kayfabe) lawyer as his manager. He defeated Savio Vega with a full nelson and began using the heart punch as his new finishing move. At Survivor Series, Crush was paired with Goldust, Jerry Lawler and Hunter Hearst Helmsley against Marc Mero, Jake Roberts, Rocky Maivia and Barry Windham in a Survivor Series match. Crush's team was on the losing end. In the fall of 1996, Crush began a rivalry with Vega, during which, he and Clarence Mason joined Nation of Domination (NOD) under the leadership of Faarooq, another client of Mason.

Crush's rivalry with Vega ended when he joined the Nation in early 1997. Crush aided Faarooq in his feud with Ahmed Johnson. After his loss to Goldust at King of the Ring, Crush argued with Savio Vega, during Faarooq's WWF Championship title shot, which distracted Faarooq, causing him to lose the match. The following night on Raw is War, Crush and Vega, along with the rest of Nation were fired by Faarooq, turning Crush face for the first time since 1993. As a result, Crush began feuding with Faarooq and formed his own biker faction called Disciples of Apocalypse, which was introduced on the June 23 episode of Raw is War.

Crush led the DOA into a gang war against Faarooq's Nation of Domination and Savio Vega's Los Boricuas throughout the late 1997, thus turning into a fan favorite. The three leaders fought in a triple threat match at Ground Zero, which Vega won. The DOA traded wins with Los Boricuas at SummerSlam, Badd Blood: In Your House and the November 22 episode of Shotgun Saturday Night. DOA had their next rivalry with The Truth Commission, which culminated in a Survivor Series match between the two teams at Survivor Series, which Truth Commission won.

Adams left the WWF in the fall of 1997, partially in protest to the Montreal Screwjob. His absence was explained by a storyline injury sustained during a brawl with Kane on the November 24 episode of Raw is War. Crush's last appearance was on the November 29 episode of Shotgun Saturday Night, where DOA defeated enhancement talents Steve Corino, Marty Garner, Jason Ahrndt, and Mike Hollow.

=== World Championship Wrestling ===
==== New World Order (1998–1999) ====
Adams signed with World Championship Wrestling (WCW) and made his debut on the February 16, 1998 episode of Nitro as a heel by attacking Bret Hart, revealing himself as the newest member of the New World Order (nWo). Adams made his in-ring debut on the February 19 episode of Thunder in a tag team match with nWo teammate Curt Hennig against Davey Boy Smith and Jim Neidhart, with the match resulting in a double disqualification. The nWo split in April 1998 and Adams chose to join Hollywood Hogan's nWo Hollywood faction. Adams made his pay-per-view (PPV) debut at Slamboree against Lex Luger in a losing effort.

Adams received a shot for the World Heavyweight Championship against Goldberg on the July 27 episode of Nitro, but failed to win the title. He lost to Steve McMichael at Road Wild and pulled out an upset win over Eddie Guerrero on the August 30 episode of Monday Nitro, only after Guerrero laid down for Adams on purpose due to his protest with WCW management.

Adams became a lower card performer, he often tag-teamed with the likes of Scott Norton and Stevie Ray, occasionally losing matches against smaller and lesser known wrestlers. However, he also gained quick victories over enhancement talents in singles competition. He was usually used by the nWo as a henchman due to his big size. Adams and Norton defeated Fit Finlay and Jerry Flynn in Adams' debut at Starrcade.

In 1999, Adams was put into nWo Black and White or nWo B-Team, a group of mid-card nWo wrestlers of the nWo Reunion after both nWo factions united. Adams was put into a partnership with Horace Hogan and the two participated in a tournament to crown the new World Tag Team Champions. They ousted Billy Kidman and Chavo Guerrero Jr. and Faces of Fear before losing to Curt Henning and Barry Windham and Chris Benoit and Dean Malenko in semi-final matches.

==== The Demon and KroniK (1999–2001) ====
Afterwards, he was chosen to portray the Kiss-themed wrestler "The Demon" after walking out on the New World Order and entering a limo that supposedly had the band inside. He played the character for its debut on the August 23 episode of Nitro in which Kiss also played a live concert. He would play it one more time to come out and have a staredown with Vampiro and abandoned it afterwards without wrestling. The Demon mantle was subsequently passed to Dale Torborg with no explanation given. Adams switched back to competing under his given name and returned for a title shot for the United States Heavyweight Championship against Sid Vicious on the October 4 episode of Nitro, where he lost. After defeating Horace Hogan on the October 13 episode of Thunder, Adams took a hiatus.

In the spring of 2000, Adams received the biggest push of his WCW career when he was put into a tag team with Bryan Clark called KroniK. The team debuted at Spring Stampede as Vince Russo's mercenaries in the New Blood stable, helping Shane Douglas and Buff Bagwell to beat Ric Flair and Lex Luger to win the World Tag Team Championship by delivering a High Times to Luger.

However, KroniK switched allegiances to The Millionaire's Club after Russo betrayed them and they defeated Douglas and The Wall to win the World Tag Team Championship for the first time on the May 15 episode of Nitro, thus turning faces. KroniK dropped the belts to New Blood members Perfect Event on the May 31 episode of Thunder. At The Great American Bash, KroniK defeated The Mamalukes to earn a title shot at the tag team titles and began their second reign by beating Perfect Event at Bash at the Beach. KroniK then entered a rivalry with the entire Natural Born Thrillers faction, and retained the tag team titles against the Thrillers and Misfits in Action in a Four Corners match before losing them to Vampiro and The Great Muta at New Blood Rising.

Following the title loss, KroniK lost a first blood chain match to The Harris Brothers at Fall Brawl. In the fall of 2000, KroniK began working as "hired muscles", similar to WWF's tag team Acolytes Protection Agency. On the October 2 episode of Nitro, KroniK turned heels after Vince Russo managed to bribe them in order to have them attack Goldberg, resulting in a handicap elimination match at Halloween Havoc, which Goldberg won.

KroniK helped The Boogie Knights battle The Filthy Animals in subsequent matches at Mayhem and Millennium Final. As the year ended, KroniK were hired by their former enemies, the Natural Born Thrillers, during which they helped them at the Starrcade event, by facing Reno and Big Vito in a tag team match, during which Reno turned on Vito and had been revealed as the one who had paid KroniK to assault Vito in the previous weeks. A month later, at Sin, KroniK turned faces by ending their association with Thrillers, as they turned on Thrillers leader Mike Sanders by helping Ernest Miller beat Sanders to become the WCW Commissioner. The following month, at SuperBrawl Revenge, KroniK made their final pay-per-view appearance, where they were scheduled to face Totally Buffed (Lex Luger and Buff Bagwell), in a #1 contender's match for the tag team titles. Clark was injured by Mike Awesome before the match, leaving Adams to face them in a handicap match, which he lost. KroniK remained with WCW until the company was purchased by WWF on March 23, 2001.

=== Third return to WWF (2001) ===
After the WWF's purchase of WCW, KroniK appeared in WWF as part of the Alliance storyline. During their time in WWF, they were managed by Steven Richards and were placed in a short feud with The Brothers of Destruction (The Undertaker and Kane). Adams and Clark faced, and lost to, the duo at the 2001 Unforgiven pay-per-view. Adams was sent down to Heartland Wrestling Association, a development territory of WWF, however he was released in November 2001 when his contract was bought out.

=== World Wrestling All-Stars and Japan (2001–2003) ===
Adams and Clark briefly worked for World Wrestling All-Stars (WWA) in early 2002. They then traveled to Japan to work for All Japan Pro Wrestling (AJPW). On July 17, 2002, at an AJPW pay-per-view, Adams and Clark defeated Keiji Mutoh and Taiyō Kea for the World Tag Team Championship. Adams and Clark remained champions until October 2002 when AJPW declared the title vacant, because Adams had left the promotion to pursue a boxing career.

After recovering from his shoulder injury that occurred during his boxing training, Adams returned to wrestling for "Wrestle 1", a pay-per-view for the Japanese promotion W-1, which was a promotion with close ties to AJPW and held at the Tokyo Dome. In January 2003, he made his last in-ring appearance, teaming with Bryan Clark, and facing Bill Goldberg and Keiji Mutoh in a losing effort. He suffered a spinal injury in this match that forced him into retirement.

== Boxing career ==
Adams, who had success as an amateur boxer in the United States Air Force, was scheduled to have his first professional boxing match against Rick Zufall on November 16, 2002, at the Mandalay Bay Resort and Casino in Las Vegas, Nevada with professional wrestler Randy Savage in his corner. This bout was to air on the Never Surrender boxing pay-per-view, but while training, Adams sustained a shoulder injury which forced him to pull out of the bout.

== Personal life and death ==
Brian Adams had surgery to attempt to correct his spinal injury, but it left him unfit to continue to wrestle. Following his retirement, Adams became a bodyguard for his longtime friend, wrestler-turned-rapper Randy Savage, who was touring to promote his CD, Be a Man. It was reported that Adams was living on income from a Lloyd's of London insurance policy. Adams expressed interest in opening a health club in Tampa, Florida, which was to be a franchise of fellow wrestler Marc Mero's "Body Slam" training center. Adams and his wife had two children together.

Adams was friends with Mark Calaway, The Undertaker. Calaway mentioned Adams in his WWE Hall of Fame speech.

=== Legal issues ===
On March 13, 1995, Adams was arrested at his home in Kona, Hawaii, after narcotics officers searched his home and discovered 500 units of anabolic steroids without prescriptions and several unregistered automatic firearms. He was released on $10,275 bail. On October 28, 1995, he was sentenced to five years probation after pleading no-contest to 11 counts of drug and weapons charges.

=== Death ===
On August 13, 2007, Adams was found dead by his wife at their Tampa, Florida home. The medical examiner concluded that the cause of death was a result of mixing the painkiller buprenorphine with the muscle relaxant carisoprodol and the sedatives chlordiazepoxide and alprazolam. The coroner determined the drugs in his system were individually at therapeutic levels, but their combination impeded his respiratory system enough to kill him. He was 43 years old.

== In media ==
In 1996, Brian Adams had an uncredited role in the Bollywood movie Khiladiyon Ka Khiladi. In the movie, he played "Crush" and was killed by "The Undertaker" (played by Brian Lee) in a wrestling match.

In 2025, Adams' estate signed a Legends contract with WWE and he was included in WWE 2K26 as Demolition Crush.

== Championships and accomplishments ==
- All Japan Pro Wrestling
  - World Tag Team Championship (1 time) – with Bryan Clark
- Oregon Wrestling Federation
  - OWF Tag Team Championship (1 time) - with Mike Miller
- Pacific Northwest Wrestling
  - NWA Pacific Northwest Heavyweight Championship (2 times)
  - NWA Pacific Northwest Tag Team Championship (2 times) – with The Grappler (1) and Steve Doll (1)
  - Salem City Tournament (1988)
- Pro Wrestling Illustrated
  - Ranked No. 35 of the 500 best singles wrestlers of the year in the PWI 500 in 1993
  - Ranked No. 289 of the top 500 singles wrestlers of the "PWI Years" in 2003
  - Ranked No. 59 of the 100 best tag teams during the PWI Years with Smash and Ax in 2003
- World Championship Wrestling
  - WCW World Tag Team Championship (2 times) – with Bryan Clark
- World Wrestling Federation/WWF
  - WWF World Tag Team Championship (1 time) – with Smash and Ax (Note: Demolition, after Crush became a member, defended the titles via the Freebird Rule.)
- Wrestling Observer Newsletter
  - Worst Worked Match of the Year (2001) with Bryan Clark vs. The Undertaker and Kane at Unforgiven
  - Worst Feud of the Year (1997) vs. Los Boricuas
  - Worst Tag Team (2000, 2001) with Bryan Clark

== See also ==
- List of premature professional wrestling deaths
