= Bryan Clark =

American professional wrestler (born 1964)

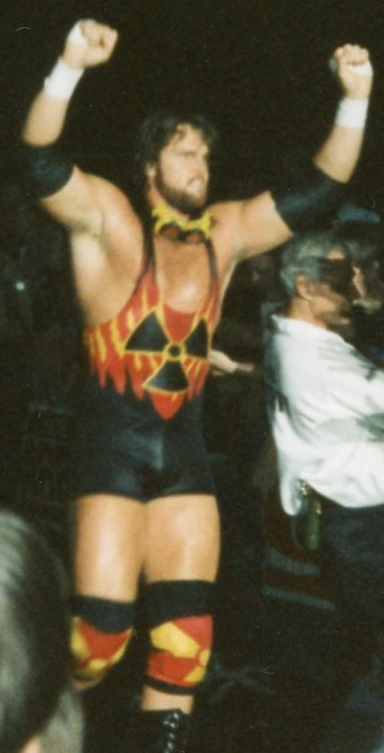
- Clark in 1995

Personal information
- Born: Bryan Emmett Clark; March 14, 1964 (age 62) Tallahassee, Florida, U.S.

Professional wrestling career
- Ring name(s): Adam Bomb; Bryan Clark; The Nightstalker; Wrath
- Billed height: 6 ft 6 in (198 cm)
- Billed weight: 290 lb (132 kg)
- Billed from: Three Mile Island; Devil's Island
- Trained by: Jody Hamilton; DeWayne Bruce
- Debut: 1989
- Retired: 2003

Bryan Emmett Clark (born March 14, 1964) is an American retired professional wrestler. He is best known for his appearances with World Championship Wrestling (WCW), the World Wrestling Federation (WWF), and All Japan Pro Wrestling (AJPW) under the ring names The Nightstalker, Adam Bomb, Wrath and his real name. He is a former two-time WCW World Tag Team Champion and one-time AJPW World Tag Team Champion with his KroniK teammate, Brian Adams.

== Professional wrestling career ==
=== American Wrestling Association (1989–1990) ===
Clark made his wrestling debut in 1989 under the ring name The Nightstalker, after completing training under Jody Hamilton and DeWayne Bruce in Atlanta, Georgia. After working matches on the independent circuit, Clark joined the Minnesota-based American Wrestling Association (AWA). He appeared at live AWA house shows and television events, mainly in the midwestern United States, with some of these matches being broadcast on ESPN's AWA Championship Wrestling show (ESPN Classic continues to air re-runs of the show). Wrestling legend Ox Baker began to manage Clark during this time, providing for some classic promotional segments with Baker on the microphone. The Nightstalker had a feud with The Trooper (Del Wilkes, later to be known as The Patriot). This began as The Nightstalker appeared during a Trooper match versus W.T. Jones on April 13, 1990, at an ESPN televised show in Rochester, Minnesota. Ox Baker began to challenge any and all wrestlers to include Larry Zbyszko, even telling The Trooper that he "couldn't even join the boy scouts". Clark's in-ring look included black and white face paint, while gripping an over-sized hatchet.

=== World Championship Wrestling (1990–1991) ===
As the AWA went into dormancy in the fall of 1990, Clark made the jump to World Championship Wrestling (WCW). He made his first appearance on the November 10 edition of WCW Saturday Night and defeated enhancement talent Gary Jackson. Ten days later, Clark was defeated by Sid Vicious at Clash of the Champions XIII: Thanksgiving Thunder. He then formed an alliance with The Big Cat and was scheduled to team with him against Vicious and Dan Spivey at Starrcade. Clark would miss the pay-per-view and be replaced by The Motor City Madman.

Clark would be absent from WCW until October 1991, when he made an appearance as a masked "ghoul" at Halloween Havoc. Two months later he replaced an injured Diamond Studd at Starrcade to team with Rick Steiner in a losing effort to Vader and Mr. Hughes. He would depart WCW shortly thereafter.

=== Universal Wrestling Federation (1992) ===
Clark moved onto Herb Abrams' Universal Wrestling Federation (UWF), making his first appearance on June 19, 1992, at a TV taping in Spartanburg, South Carolina. He had three matches, defeating Johnny Kid and Jake Steele while losing by disqualification to Death Row 3260.

=== Smoky Mountain Wrestling (1992–1993) ===
Clark joined Smoky Mountain Wrestling (SMW) in October 1992 after being suggested to booker Jim Cornette by Paul Orndorff, making his debut on a show in Knoxville, Tennessee, losing to SMW Heavyweight Champion Brian Lee by countout. He later defeated Tracy Smothers to become the promotion's second-ever SMW Beat the Champ Television Champion on February 2, 1993. Clark lost the title to Tim Horner six days later, and left the promotion soon thereafter when he was offered a contract by the World Wrestling Federation.

=== World Wrestling Federation (1993–1995) ===
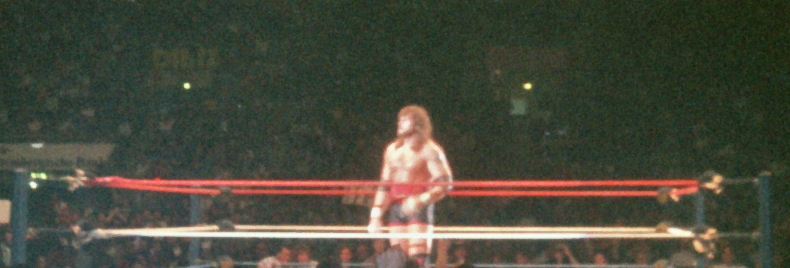
Bomb in May 1994

On March 8, 1993, Clark received a tryout match for the World Wrestling Federation (WWF), wrestling Reno Riggins at a WWF Superstars taping in North Charleston, South Carolina as The Nightstalker. He had another tryout match the following night at a WWF Wrestling Challenge taping, defeating Ricky Nelson. In May 1993, Clark debuted as Adam Bomb, the newest client of Johnny Polo. Wearing luminous green contact lenses and sporting a red tongue, Bomb's gimmick was that of a survivor of the infamous Three Mile Island nuclear meltdown accident that took place in Pennsylvania in 1979, which was further emphasized by his ring name being a pun on the "atom bomb". Furthermore, the Adam Bomb character was actually billed from Three Mile Island. Seven months after his debut, Harvey Wippleman replaced Polo as Bomb's manager because Polo wanted to focus on managing WWF Tag Team Champions The Quebecers. The Adam Bomb concept and costume was designed and created by Tom Fleming.

Bomb made his pay-per-view debut at Survivor Series, where he teamed up with Irwin R. Schyster, Diesel and "The Model" Rick Martel against Razor Ramon, The 1-2-3 Kid, Marty Jannetty and "The Macho Man" Randy Savage in an elimination match. His team went on to lose the match, though he was the last remaining wrestler for his team before being pinned by Jannetty after a roll-up.

Following this, he participated in the 1994 Royal Rumble, where he was the final entrant in the match. However, he lasted less than five minutes before being eliminated by Lex Luger. He also was one of nine wrestlers who helped Yokozuna beat Undertaker during a Casket match. Following the Rumble and a feud with Earthquake, at WrestleMania X, Bomb was defeated by Earthquake in 35 seconds. The two had a more competitive rematch the following night on Raw, which Bomb also lost. Bomb would soon turn face after his manager Harvey Wippleman turned on him in favor of his new client, Kwang, leading Kwang in attacking Bomb. As a face, Adam Bomb would throw rubber nuclear missiles into the audience as he walked to the ring and after he won a match. After briefly feuding with Kwang and Bam Bam Bigelow, Bomb was moved down the card and began competing exclusively on WWF Superstars before abruptly quitting the promotion in August 1995. Clark cited unhappiness with pay and the rigorous WWF travel schedule as his reasons for leaving. Clark also claimed that a promised run with the WWF Intercontinental Championship, which would have resulted in higher pay, was not fulfilled and a significant factor in his decision to leave.

=== Independent Circuit and England (1995–1996) ===
After leaving WWF, Clark continued using the Adam Bomb name in the independent circuit and England in 1996 where he worked for Hammerlock Bomb Alert Tour with Andre Baker.

=== Return to WCW (1997–2001) ===
==== Blood Runs Cold (1997–1999) ====
At Uncensored on March 16, 1997, Clark rejoined WCW as Wrath, a helmeted martial artist, who joined Mortis to attack Glacier after Glacier defeated Mortis. Wrath would then team with Mortis as the two were managed by James Vanderberg to feud with Glacier. Wrath's first televised match occurred on the May 12 episode of Nitro, in which he defeated Scotty Riggs. At Slamboree, Wrath attacked Glacier during a rematch between Glacier and Mortis, and then Wrath and Mortis double-teamed Glacier until the debuting Ernest Miller made the save. Miller began teaming with Glacier to feud with Wrath and Mortis. The four characters, collectively known as "Blood Runs Cold", was WCW's attempt to tap into the popularity of the Mortal Kombat video games. Wrath would then compete in his first pay-per-view match at The Great American Bash against Glacier, which Wrath lost. At Bash at the Beach, Wrath and Mortis defeated Glacier and Miller to hand Glacier his first pinfall loss in WCW.

Wrath and Mortis would then feud with The Faces of Fear (Meng and The Barbarian), defeating them in a match at Fall Brawl. The following night, on Nitro, Wrath and Mortis unsuccessfully challenged The Outsiders (Kevin Nash and Scott Hall) for the World Tag Team Championship. At World War 3, Wrath participated in the namesake match to earn a future World Heavyweight Championship opportunity. Scott Hall won the match. The Blood Runs Cold angle continued until 1998 when Clark suffered an injury.

After recovery, he returned to singles action later in the year as a face, debuting both a new attire and finishing move called the Meltdown while all Blood Runs Cold references were phased out. Wrath had a lengthy undefeated streak on WCW television, defeating various wrestlers including Meng at Halloween Havoc and Glacier at World War 3. Due to the impressive win record, Clark was rumored to be slated to become a future challenger to Bill Goldberg but had his win streak was broken on the November 23 episode of Nitro with a loss to Kevin Nash. Wrath would continue to gain many victories into 1999 and entered a feud with Bam Bam Bigelow, leading to a match between the two at Souled Out, which Wrath lost. Clark tore his ACL in a match against Jerry Flynn on April 15, 1999, and spent a year recuperating.

==== KroniK (2000–2001) ====
Clark returned to the ring in April 2000, now using his real name. He formed a tag team with Brian Adams known as KroniK, and both became members of the New Blood. However, KroniK switched allegiances to the Millionaires Club after Vince Russo betrayed them and, on May 15, 2000, they defeated Shane Douglas and The Wall to win the vacant World Tag Team Championship. They later lost the title on May 30 to New Blood members Shawn Stasiak and Chuck Palumbo. KroniK was granted a rematch for the title at Bash at the Beach on July 9, and was successful in reclaiming World Tag Team Championship. KroniK then entered a feud with the entire Natural Born Thrillers stable, but retained the title against the Thrillers before losing it to Vampiro and The Great Muta at New Blood Rising on August 13. Following the title loss, KroniK turned heel after Vince Russo managed to bribe them in order to have them attack Bill Goldberg, who would be fired if he lost a single match. However, Goldberg managed to overcome the odds and pinned both Clark and Adams in a handicap match at Halloween Havoc. KroniK continued working as "hired muscle" by helping The Boogie Knights battle The Filthy Animals, and eventually helped their former enemies the Natural Born Thrillers before turning face once again in January 2001 by siding with Ernest Miller.

KroniK was sidelined when Clark needed stitches for a wound from a chair shot while Adams was hospitalized with appendicitis. While they were injured, WCW was purchased by the World Wrestling Federation in March 2001.

=== Return to WWF (2001) ===
Clark and Adams returned to the WWF on the September 4, 2001, episode of SmackDown! by attacking and double chokeslamming The Undertaker, and aligning themselves with Stevie Richards as their manager. KroniK would go on to face The Brothers of Destruction at Unforgiven in a match for the WCW Tag Team Championship, which Clark and Adams lost. After two dark matches and a pay-per-view appearance that WWF officials were unhappy with, Clark and Adams were reportedly asked to go to developmental. Clark allegedly left the meeting on the spot and was released from his contract shortly thereafter, while Adams made appearances for the Heartland Wrestling Association in Cincinnati, Ohio, which served as one of WWF's developmental territories, before ultimately being released as well.

=== Late career and retirement (2001–2003) ===
After Adams & Clark were released from the WWF in November 2001, as KroniK they made a number of appearances on the independent circuit, as well as the start-up promotion World Wrestling All-Stars (WWA) and prominent Japanese promotion All Japan Pro Wrestling (AJPW). During their time in AJPW, they defeated Keiji Mutoh and Taiyō Kea for the AJPW World Tag Team Championship on July 17, 2002. KroniK were later stripped of the title due to contract problems, and they wrestled their last match together in January 2003, losing to Goldberg and Keiji Mutoh. Shortly afterwards, both Adams and Clark retired from wrestling due to injuries.

== Personal life ==
In February 2006, Clark had surgery on his lower back for injuries sustained during his in-ring career. He owns the trademarks to the KroniK, Adam Bomb and Wrath gimmicks from his time in WCW and the WWF. Following the death of his partner Brian Adams, Clark considered their time together as part of KroniK to be the highlight of his career. He occasionally trains other wrestlers and appears at conventions.

In July 2016, Clark was named part of a class action lawsuit filed against WWE which alleged that wrestlers incurred traumatic brain injuries during their tenure and that the company concealed the risks of injury. The suit was litigated by attorney Konstantine Kyros, who has been involved in a number of other lawsuits against WWE. The lawsuit was dismissed by US District Judge Vanessa Lynne Bryant in September 2018. The lawsuit is now being heard by the Supreme Court in the fall of 2021.

In February 2020, Clark was indicted in Maricopa County, Arizona on five felony charges relating to alleged acts between January and April 2019. Charges included conspiracy, drug possession, illegal control of enterprise, transporting or selling narcotics, and possessing a weapon during a drug offense. He pleaded not guilty to all charges. On June 18, 2021, all charges were "dismissed by prosecution motion" in the Superior Court of Maricopa County. thus causing Clark's entire case to be thrown out.

Clark is a United States Air Force veteran.

== Championships and accomplishments ==
- All Japan Pro Wrestling
  - World Tag Team Championship (1 time) – with Brian Adams
- Pro Wrestling Illustrated
  - Ranked No. 47 of the top 500 singles wrestlers of the year in the PWI 500 in 1995
  - Ranked No. 466 of the top 500 singles wrestlers of the "PWI Years" in 2003
- Smoky Mountain Wrestling
  - SMW Beat the Champ Television Championship (1 time)
- World Championship Wrestling
  - WCW World Tag Team Championship (2 times) – with Brian Adams
- Wrestling Observer Newsletter
  - Worst Tag Team (2000, 2001) with Brian Adams
  - Worst Worked Match of the Year (2001) with Brian Adams vs. The Undertaker and Kane at Unforgiven
