= Mickie Henson =

American professional wrestling referee (1963–2022)

Personal information
- Born: Mickie Jay Henson; January 2nd, 1963 Rock Island, IL, U.S.
- Died: February 14, 2022 (aged 59) Miami, Florida, U.S.

Professional wrestling career
- Ring name(s): Mickey Jay; Mickie Henson
- Debut: 1987
- Retired: 2009

Mickie Jay Henson (January 2, 1963 – February 14, 2022) was an American professional wrestling referee. He was best known for his time with World Championship Wrestling from 1992 to 2001 and World Wrestling Entertainment (WWE) from 2005 to 2009.

== Professional wrestling career ==
=== Championship Wrestling from Florida (1987–1991) ===
Henson broke into the business with the help of Steve Keirn, Mike Graham and Gordon Solie. In 1987, he refereed his first match for Championship Wrestling from Florida (CWF). Henson later stated:

My first match was in Orlando, Fla., at the Eddie Graham Sports Complex. I think it's been turned into apartment buildings now. The match was between Bob Cook and a young Mike Awesome. I wasn't really all that nervous. I had watched it on television forever. I paid attention to the referees, and when I got out there I kind of just fell into it. I was lucky enough to learn from some of the best workers of the time like Dick Slater and Mike Graham so it was pretty easy to catch on.

=== World Wrestling Federation (1992–1993) ===
In 1992, Henson was a jobber in the World Wrestling Federation (WWF) appearing on Superstars and Wrestling Challenge. He faced The Undertaker, Rick Martel, Sid Vicious, Skinner and The Nasty Boys.

=== World Championship Wrestling (1992–2001) ===
Jim Crockett Promotions eventually took over the area and Henson began refereeing in World Championship Wrestling (WCW) in 1992. Henson refereed the main event at Starrcade in 1998 between WCW World Heavyweight Champion Goldberg and Kevin Nash, which Nash won. He also refereed the Bret Hart–Chris Benoit match in honor of Owen Hart.

On February 15, 2000 episode of Thunder, Henson wrestled against Mark Johnson, which Johnson won.

When Vince McMahon and the World Wrestling Federation (WWF) bought WCW in March 2001, Henson was out of the job.

=== World Wrestling Entertainment (2005–2009) ===
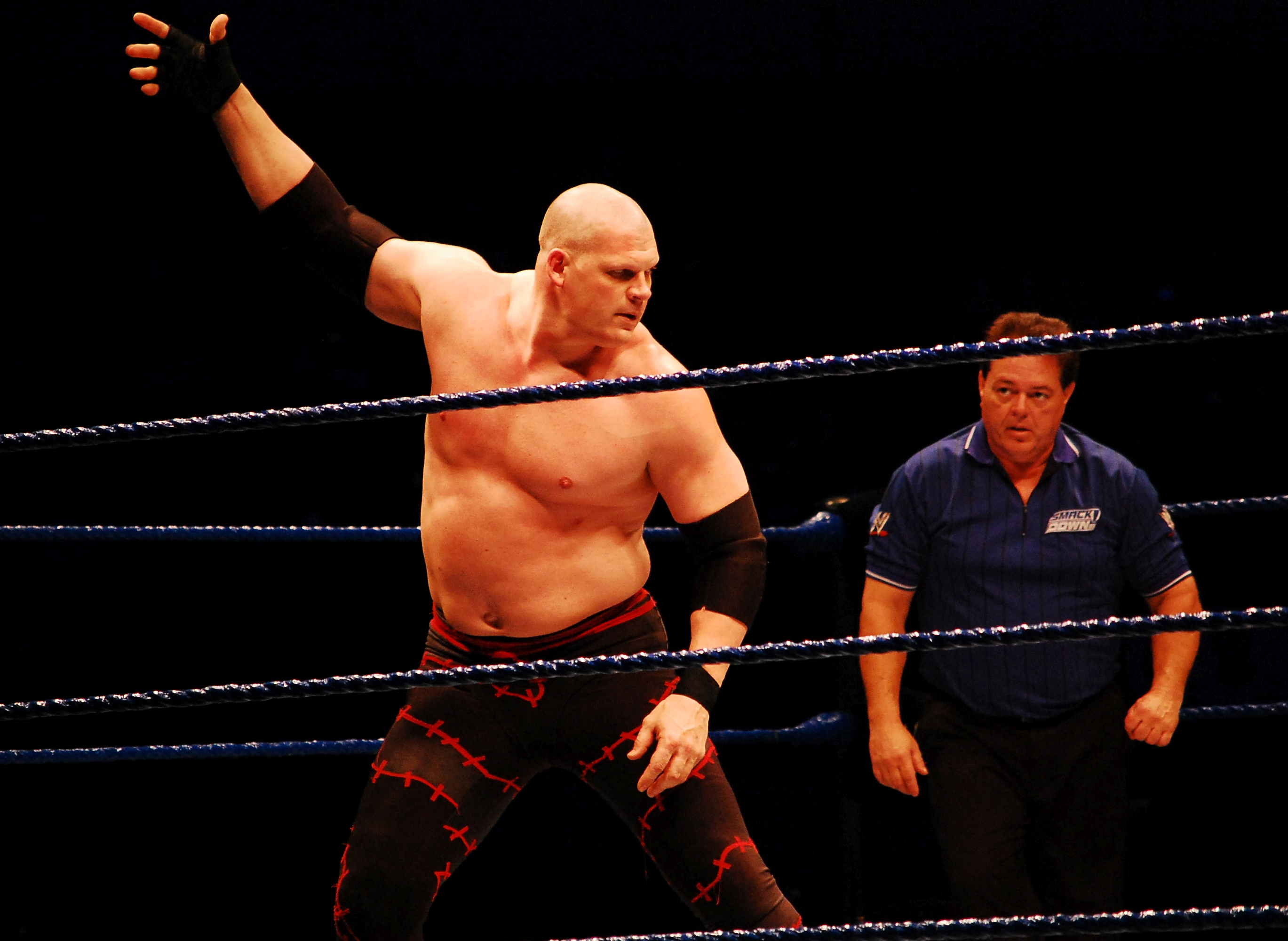
Henson (right) refereeing a house show match, involving Kane, 2008

After he was signed by World Wrestling Entertainment (WWE) in 2005 he was placed on the Raw brand officiating matches, such as the John Cena–Kurt Angle WWE Championship match at Survivor Series in 2005 and the Hardcore match between Edge and Mick Foley at WrestleMania 22.

He continued to officiate matches on Raw for nine months until 2006, when he was moved over to the newly established ECW brand. He made his debut for the brand on the July 18 episode, officiating a match between Mike Knox and The Sandman, as well as the main event ECW World Championship match between Big Show and The Undertaker. He was named the ECW brand head official shortly after. Despite moving to SmackDown in February 2007, he was featured as the only ECW brand referee in WWE SmackDown vs. Raw 2008.

In February 2007, Henson was moved to the SmackDown brand and later became its head official. In late 2008, WWE made the decision to have universal referees, in which referees were to appear on every brand, which included Henson. He was then pulled off the road in 2008 due to health issues. On January 14, 2009, Henson was released from his contract with WWE.

== Personal life and death ==
Henson stated that he liked to go fishing. He lived in Key West, Florida, for about 16 years. He was diagnosed with Mantle cell lymphoma in 2008, and given months to live. However, he was able to beat the cancer. Henson died from Pulmonary Fibrosis on February 14, 2022, at age 59.

== Accomplishments ==
- Cauliflower Alley Club
  - Charlie Smith Referee’s Award (2018)

Sporting positions
Preceded by First	ECW Senior Referee; 2006–2007	Succeeded by Scott Armstrong
Preceded by Nick Patrick	SmackDown Senior Referee; 2007–2008	Succeeded by Scott Armstrong
