= Ernest Miller =

American professional wrestler and actor (born 1964)

Personal information
- Born: Ernest Clifford Miller; January 14, 1964 (age 62) Atlanta, Georgia, U.S.

Professional wrestling career
- Ring name: Ernest "The Cat" Miller
- Billed height: 6 ft 2 in (1.88 m)
- Billed weight: 235 lb (107 kg)
- Billed from: Atlanta, Georgia
- Trained by: DeWayne Bruce; WCW Power Plant
- Debut: February 1997
- Retired: 2024

Ernest Clifford Miller (born January 14, 1964), known by his ring name Ernest "The Cat" Miller, is an American actor, martial artist, and former professional wrestler, known for his work with World Championship Wrestling (WCW) and World Wrestling Entertainment (WWE).

== Early life ==
Born in Atlanta, Miller graduated from Gordon High School in Decatur, Georgia, playing on the football team as a linebacker. He then went to Savannah State University in Savannah, Georgia studying electrical engineering and playing football as an All-American linebacker. He was drafted by the Winnipeg Blue Bombers of the CFL, but ultimately didn't play any games.

A lifelong karateka, Miller won several titles in point sparring and also competed in ISKA kickboxing. During the 1990s, he was an instructor at Joe Corley's American Karate School.

== Wrestling career ==
=== World Championship Wrestling (1997–2001) ===
==== Early years (1997–1999) ====
Miller was brought to professional wrestling after being asked by WCW executive Eric Bischoff, at the time Miller was Bischoff's son Garett's karate instructor. Miller was initially reluctant, but was convinced to take the offer after a meeting with Booker T and Stevie Ray.

He made his World Championship Wrestling (WCW) debut on February 12, 1997, where he worked 3 matches that night for TV tapings. The first two matches were victories over Sgt. Buddy Lee Parker and Johnny Swinger. The last match was a loss to Glacier on WCW Worldwide which aired on April 13. He saved Glacier from a two-on-one attack by Wrath and Mortis at the 1997 Slamboree pay-per-view. Initially thought as just a fan who had jumped the railing, the WCW commentators then realized that this was no ordinary man and he was in fact the three-time karate champion Ernest Miller. Glacier and Ernest Miller quickly became tag team partners in their feud with Mortis and Wrath. After Glacier turned on Miller, Ernest left him and became a villain with Sonny Onoo as his manager. It was during this time that Miller's popularity heightened.

Miller's initial wrestling gimmick emphasized his real-life martial arts background, often emphasizing karate strikes and kicks in his moveset. As a villain, Miller adopted an arrogant, Muhammad Ali-like trash-talking personality, calling himself "The Greatest" and gloating that he could beat anybody within two minutes, which he often did using his signature kicks. It was also around this time that Ernest began wearing ruby slippers in the ring and dancing in a James Brown-esque fashion to celebrate his victories. He would claim on Nitro that he knew the actual James Brown, leading to a pay-per-view "dance-off" between Miller and Brown, who had been brought in specially. Miller even went as far promoting his own instructional, karate home video with a pseudo infomercial. This served as a comedic parody to Billy Blanks' Tae Bo exercise videos which were quite popular at the time. Miller and Onoo also did comedy duo routines similar to Chris Tucker and Jackie Chan's characters from the film Rush Hour.

Miller then began a minor feud with Kaz Hayashi, as Onoo has been previously Hayashi's manager and had left him to manage Miller. Ernest won several matches over Hayashi with Onoo's help, and also enlisted Perry Saturn as his ally. However, Saturn suffered many losses against inferior opponents due to Miller's botched interference, so the two faced off at Starrcade, where Saturn won. Miller continued coming out and challenging the fans, the wrestlers, and anyone else to try and take him out, feuding with Scott Norton. For a time, he started coming out with the snow machine and music of Glacier, which Onoo had "purchased", but it was short-lived, and he soon returned to his James Brown music. In March 1999, Miller and Onoo attacked fellow martial artist Jerry Flynn, with Ernest cutting off Flynn's ponytail as a sign of disrespect. They all faced off in Uncensored in a handicap match, but Flyinn defeated them both. Miller bounced back after some time, getting a win over Scott Norton after hitting him with a crowbar. He and Norton were scheduled to wrestle in The Great American Bash, but Norton was pulled out for health problems and replaced with Horace Hogan, who Miller defeated after kicking him with a steel-tipped red dancing shoe.

In June 1999, Miller had a dancing contest with Disco Inferno, who he attacked in jealously over the fans's attention. They fought in Bash at the Beach in a "dance match" with the stipulation that the loser could not dance anymore (though this stipulation was removed at Bash at the Beach), with Miller winning thanks to Onoo. The Cat's next opponent would be Buff Bagwell, who became famous by doing an impersonation of Miller with a bald cap and black face paint. The two met at Road Wild, but this time Onoo's help backfired when he accidentally hit the wrong man with a briefcase, making Miller lose the match. After that, the two broke up and Onoo left WCW.

==== Commissioner (2000–2001) ====
Miller became a jobber for a long time, until he was chosen as Eric Bischoff's assistant. His role initially was composed of following Bischoff wherever he went and repeating whatever Bischoff said for comedic effect, but he was eventually appointed WCW Commissioner in 2000. As a commissioner, his motivations were the ratings and impressing the people in charge, and he often booked super matches for the main events. During this time, he got in a storyline where the Jung Dragons stalked him and tried to attack him, but Miller usually fended them off. In July 2000, Miller outlawed WCW United States Heavyweight Champion Scott Steiner's finisher, the Steiner Recliner, with the pretext of being too dangerous. Miller continued interfering in Steiner's reign, helping Mike Awesome during their fight in Bash at the Beach by disqualifying Steiner and stripping him of the title. Miller then feuded with yet another Japanese wrestler, The Great Muta, leading to a match at New Blood Rising. Although Muta used his Asian mist to blind Miller at one point, Ernest's ally Tygress interfered to hit Muta with a chair, which allowed Miller to land his finishing move for the victory.

After this match, he started to slowly turn into a fan favorite due to the high fan reaction he was getting whenever he entered an arena, coming to a rivalry with Mike Sanders from the Natural Born Thrillers stable, who sought to be the new commissioner. Miller offered Sanders a kickboxing match for the role, something which naturally had Mike afraid, but he agreed. During the match, Miller dominated three rounds, but at the last one he was attacked by Sanders's partner Shane Douglas, who pulled him out of the ring and made him being counted out. Angry at losing the commissionership, Miller kept chasing Douglas for the next months, enlisting Miss Jones as his valet to counter Douglas' Torrie Wilson. Ernest and Douglas fought at Mayhem, where Miller won after Jones overpowered Wilson and gave Miller his old loaded red shoe, which he used to knock Shane out.

Miller then became an enemy of Lance Storm, the leader of Team Canada, wrestling at Starrcade. The former karate champion had to endure many interferences from Major Gunns and Elix Skipper, but although he and Miss Jones kept them at bay, she accidentally knocked the referee out with a misguided kick, which allowed a reluctant Hacksaw Jim Duggan to attack Miller, making him lose. Right after, Team Canada turned on Duggan and beat him down, until Miller saved him. Ernest turned again to get the commissioner's spot and challenged Sanders for it, but Mike wanted none of it, bringing KroniK as mercenaries to take him down and putting the role on the line only if Miller accepted to give him Miss Jones's services. Miller and Sanders fought at Sin, where Sanders tried to hit The Cat with a chair, but Miss Jones impeded it. KroniK and Natural Born Thrillers came to finally put Ernest away, but then it was revealed that KroniK had been secretly hired by Miller, which turned them against Sanders and made Miller win the match, regaining his place as the WCW commissioner.

Miller's victory was short-lived, as Lance Storm came to reclaim the commissioner role with Ric Flair and his Magnificent Seven's help. Storm managed to defeat Ernest for the job and used the commissionership to aid his Team Canada, but Miller chased him and got a match for the role at SuperBrawl Revenge, where he won with Miss Jones's aid, gaining it back. The karate champion then started a feud with Chris Kanyon, who attacked Miss Jones to the point to put her in the hospital. Miller even gave up his role as commissioner in order to get a shot at Kanyon, chasing him for months and even having a street fight in Jones's hospital room. Kanyon then attacked Miller's limo driver M.I. Smooth by using a forklift to flip over his limo with Smooth inside, and later attacking him with several steel chair shots to the head. At Greed, Miller and Kanyon faced, with The Cat having to protect Miss Jones during the match, but he was victorious with Jones's help, later being attacked by Kanyon after the bell until Smooth made the save with the same chair he was attacked with. Miller and his drive feuded with Kanyon and his ally, Road Warrior Animal, but the feud never had a conclusion due to the purchase of WCW by Vince McMahon in March 2001.

Miller had two years on his WCW contract; as a result, he decided to stay at home for the two years to take care of his children. Miller also appeared at some World Wrestling All-Stars shows in early 2002 and independent shows before going to the WWE where he would have a somewhat brief career.

=== World Wrestling Entertainment (2002–2004) ===
After WCW, he kept his Ernest "The Cat" Miller ring name and gimmick, he made his dark match debut for World Wrestling Entertainment on October 28, 2002. He then served as an announcer for Velocity from December 2002 until August 2003. After his run on Velocity, he became an active wrestler on the main roster, competing for the SmackDown brand.

Miller appeared in the 2004 Royal Rumble match, making his entrance (along with manager Lamont) while the other two people in the ring, Chris Benoit and Randy Orton, were knocked down. Miller and Lamont proceeded to dance to his theme music, not bothering to capitalize on the advantage he'd been given. When Benoit and Orton got back up, both men quickly tossed him from the ring. During his time, his catchphrase, "somebody call my momma" (which was also used in WCW), started to be used in WWE. This phrase also appeared in the lyrics to his theme song, which he would dance to. Miller then competed in a 15-man Royal Rumble on SmackDown! to earn a shot at the WWE Championship against then Champion Brock Lesnar at No Way Out, but was once again thrown out during his theme song, this time by Kurt Angle. Following this, he started a short-lived feud with Tajiri after Tajiri attacked Lamont with his trademark Buzzsaw Kick. After the feud ended, Miller was released from WWE on February 10, 2004.

From 2012 to 2014, Miller's old theme song was then recycled for the entrance of Brodus Clay's "Funkasaurus" gimmick, where Clay portrayed a fun-loving, funk dancer accompanied by The Funkadactyls (Naomi and Cameron). Clay also started to use Miller's phrase, saying 'Somebody better call my momma'. In November 2013, Clay started a storyline with the debuting Xavier Woods, whom he became angry and jealous towards for "borrowing" Miller's theme song and The Funkadactyls for his own entrance, eventually leading to his heel turn the following month.

=== Later career (2006, 2015–2019) ===
Two years after his release from WWE, Miller worked a tag match on March 17, 2006, with his team losing. The event was held at Pro Wrestling Evolution in Canton, Georgia.

Miller came out of retirement on November 28, 2015, at WrestleCade competing in a battle royal won by Ethan Carter III in Winston-Salem, North Carolina. He continued working in the independent circuit. On October 13, 2018, Miller teamed with fellow WCW alumnus Glacier and 79 year old Bob Armstrong in a 6 tag match in which they won for Georgia Premier Wrestling in Rome, Georgia. On December 13, 2019, Miller teamed with former WCW wrestlers; Glacier, Haku and Luther Biggs as they won an 8 tag match for Sunray Pro Wrestling in Orlando, Florida. Afterwards Miller stopped wrestling due to COVID-19.

=== Return to wrestling (2022–present) ===
Miller returned to wrestling at 58 years old. He lost to Joey Janela at Game Charger Wrestling/Black Pro Label 4 Cups Stuffed in Hoffman Estates, Illinois on September 2, 2022.

Miller made an appearance on the January 19, 2023 episode of Impact! to help the new Director of Authority Santino Marella make a six-person tag match to open that show.

On July 12, 2025, Miller accompanied Goldberg to the ring during his retirement match at Saturday Night's Main Event XL.

== Acting work ==
Miller had a significant role in the Academy Award-nominated film The Wrestler as The Ayatollah, in-ring nemesis of Randy "The Ram" Robinson (Mickey Rourke). He played Earnie Shavers opposite Michael Jai White in the 2008 Chinese television series The Legend of Bruce Lee and appeared in the 2009 film Blood and Bone. He also appeared in Jackson Galaxy's 2011 American reality series My Cat from Hell.

In a January 2009 interview, Miller announced he was cast as George Foreman in an HBO biopic that, however the film was ultimately never produced. In 2025, he participated in the movie The Unbreakable Bunch.

== Championships and accomplishments ==
- Pro Wrestling Illustrated
  - Pro Wrestling Illustrated (PWI) ranked him No. 479 of the 500 best singles wrestlers during the PWI Years in 2003
