= WWA Revolution =

2002 World Wrestling All-Stars pay-per-view event

The Revolution
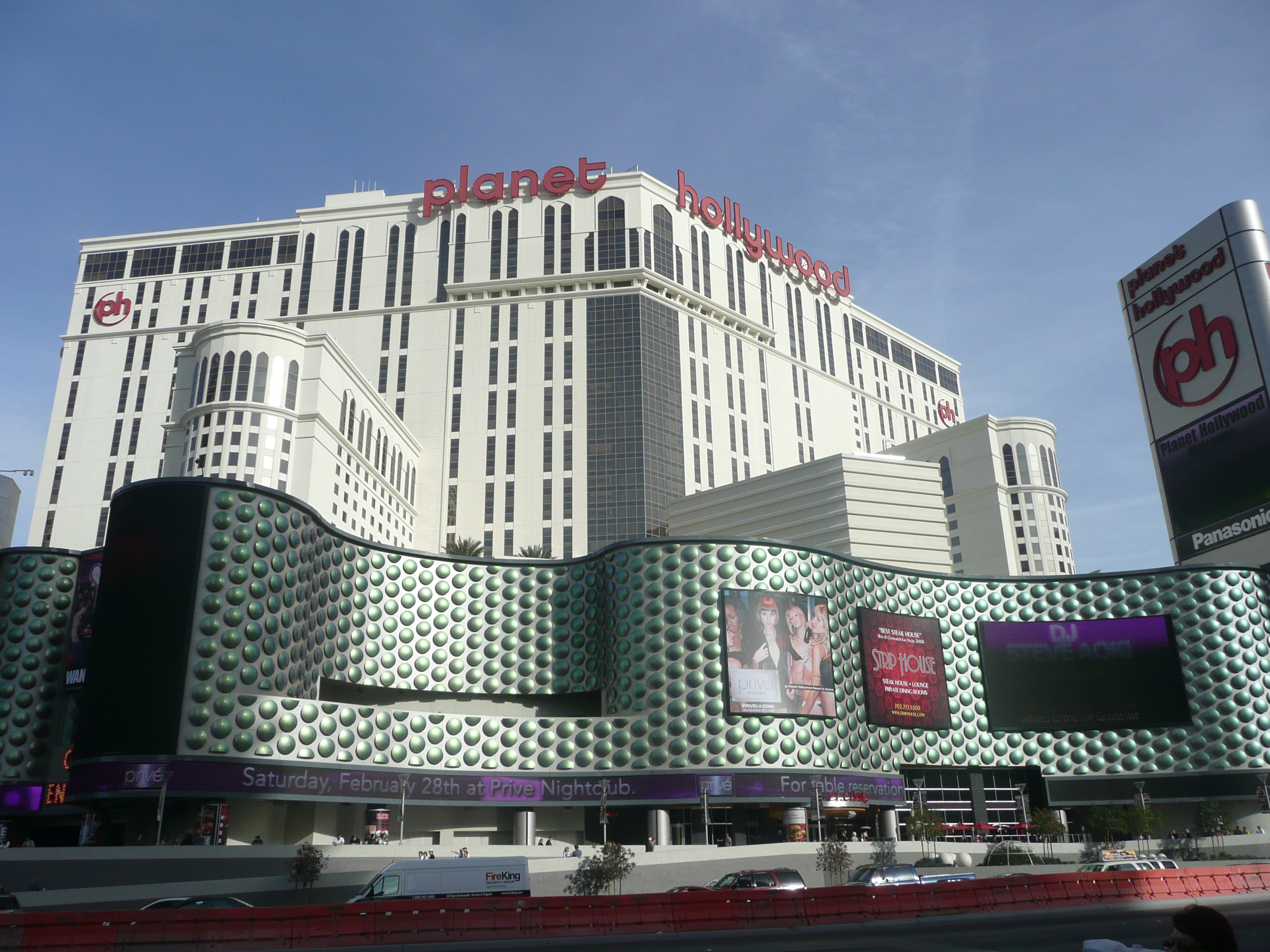
- The Aladdin Casino Center
- Promotion: World Wrestling All-Stars
- Date: February 24, 2002
- City: Paradise, Nevada, United States
- Venue: The Aladdin Casino Center
- Attendance: 2,800

Pay-per-view chronology
← Previous; The Inception	Next → The Eruption

The Revolution was the second professional wrestling pay-per-view event produced by World Wrestling All-Stars (WWA), which took place on February 24, 2002 from the Aladdin Casino Center in Paradise, Nevada, United States. The theme song was 'Revillusion', performed live at the event by American rock band Tantric, from their self-titled debut album.

Eight professional wrestling matches were contested on the card. Jeff Jarrett defended the World Heavyweight Championship against Brian Christopher in the main event. Jarrett was originally scheduled to defend the title against Randy Savage, but Savage no-showed the event and was replaced by Christopher. Jarrett retained the title. Also at the event, Eddie Guerrero defeated defending champion Psicosis and Juventud Guerrera in a triple threat match to capture the International Cruiserweight Championship.

== Production ==
=== Background ===
WWA was established in 2001 and held five pay-per-view events between 2001 and 2003.

=== Storylines ===
Revolution featured professional wrestling matches that involved wrestlers from pre-existing scripted feuds, plots, and storylines that played out on WWA shows. Wrestlers portrayed heroes or villains as they followed a series of events that built tension and culminated in a wrestling match or series of matches.

Jeff Jarrett defeated Road Dogg in the finals of the Seven Deadly Sins tournament at Inception pay-per-view in October 2001 to win the vacant WWA World Heavyweight Championship. He continued his feud with Road Dogg during the United Kingdom tour during the next two months, where Jarrett continued to retain the title against Dogg in subsequent title defenses. Brian Christopher and Road Dogg defeated Jarrett and Scott Steiner in tag team matches during the event with Christopher pinning Jarrett. Randy Savage was originally scheduled to be Jarrett's challenger at Revolution but he backed out of the event and Christopher replaced Savage in the main event on account of his pinfall victories over Jarrett.

At Inception, Juventud Guerrera defeated Psicosis in a Ladder match to win the vacant WWA International Cruiserweight Championship. Guerrera successfully defended the title against Psicosis in subsequent rematches until Psicosis defeated Guerrera to win the title on December 8, 2001. A title match was scheduled between the two at Revolution and Eddie Guerrero was added into their title match, making it a three-way match.

== Event ==
Other on-screen personnel
Role	Name
Commentators	Jeremy Borash
Commentators	Mark Madden
Commentators	Disco Inferno
Commissioner	Bret Hart
Referee	Mark "Slick" Johnson
Interviewer	Terry Taylor

=== Preliminary matches ===
The opening match was a six-way elimination match between Nova, Low Ki, Shark Boy, A.J. Styles, Tony Mamaluke and Christopher Daniels. Low Ki nailed a springboard mule kick to Shark Boy for the first elimination of the match. Styles then eliminated Mamaluke by nailing a Styles Clash. Daniels then eliminated Low Ki by hitting a side slam. Daniels was next eliminated when he tried to deliver a hurricanrana to Styles from the top rope but Styles countered it with a Styles Clash. Nova then eliminated Styles by performing a superplex for the win. After the match, Commissioner Bret Hart announced that Jeff Jarrett's originally scheduled opponent Randy Savage would not be able to compete so he would be replaced by Brian Christopher, who was originally scheduled to take on Disco Inferno.

Next, The Funkster took on Reno, with Funkster impersonating Hulk Hogan in the match. Near the end of the match, Reno delivered a Roll of the Dice to Funkster but climbed the top rope instead of pinning him and Funkster took advantage by hitting a big boot and he followed that with a piledriver and a leg drop for the win. After the match, Disco Inferno joined the commentary team to provide color commentary and issued an open challenge to anyone.

Next, KroniK (Brian Adams and Bryan Clark) took on Native Blood (The Navajo Warrior and Ghost Walker). Native Blood attacked KroniK from behind but KroniK quickly countered their attack and dominated them throughout the match. KroniK delivered a High Times to Walker for the win.

Next, Puppet the Midget Killer took on Teo in a falls count anywhere match. Puppet got a bag of thumbtacks and opened it and dropped all the thumbtacks on the ramp and then delivered a fireman's carry facebuster to Teo onto the thumbtacks for the win. Immediately, after the match, Scott Steiner came and attacked both men and then he grabbed Disco Inferno from the commentary table and attacked him. Steiner then tossed Inferno into the ring and attacked him and applied a Steiner Recliner on Inferno.

Next, Psicosis defended the International Cruiserweight Championship against Eddie Guerrero and Juventud Guerrera in a triple threat match. Psicosis tried to execute a hurricanrana to Guerrero from the top rope but Guerrero avoided it and Psicosis fell down on the mat and Guerrero hit a frog splash on Psicosis to win the title. Jerry Lynn confronted and attacked Guerrero after the match, which led to a brawl outside the ring, resulting in Lynn hitting a piledriver to Guerrero onto the title belt.

Later, Sabu took on Devon Storm in a no disqualification match. Near the end of the match, Sabu's manager Bill Alfonso attempted to hit Storm with a chair but Storm avoided it and Sabu was hit with it and then Storm pinned him for the win. Sabu attacked Storm after the match by throwing a chair at him outside the ring and placed him on a table and then dived off from the video screen onto Storm through the table. After the match, Larry Zbyszko made an appearance and challenged Vince McMahon to a match and also made fun of Chris Jericho on his "Living Legend" moniker.

In the penultimate match, Rick Steiner and The Cat took on The West Hollywood Blondes (Lenny Lane and Lodi). Rick attacked Lane and then tagged in Cat, who nailed a Feliner to Lane for the win.

=== Main event match ===
In the main event, Jeff Jarrett defended the World Heavyweight Championship against Brian Christopher. Jarrett was distracted when he tried to attack Christopher with a chair but the referee took it away. Christopher tried to nail a superkick on Jarrett but Jarrett avoided it and Christopher accidentally superkicked the referee. Christopher then nailed Jarrett with the chair and delivered a Hip Hop Drop and covered Jarrett for the pinfall and then a second referee came to count the pinfall but the original referee woke up and pulled him out of the ring. Both referees fought each other allowing Jarrett to try to hit Christopher with the title belt but Christopher avoided it and tried to nail a piledriver. Jarrett then countered with a low blow and a Stroke on Christopher to retain the title.

== Reception ==
Revolution received mixed reviews from critics. Crazy Max staff wrote "The two cruiserweight matches were good as was the Sabu/Storm match. The midget match I also liked but the commentators really killed it. A really stupid finish to the main event ruined what was otherwise a decent enough match. Overall a much better show than the first one."

Adam Nedeff of 411Mania wrote "Compliment to start; as start-up promotions go, the production was mostly slick, with a good set and a technical crew that had their act together." He criticized WWA on copying each and every thing just like World Championship Wrestling.

== Aftermath ==
WWA held its next tour in April in its native country Australia which culminated with The Eruption pay-per-view on April 12. Bret Hart left WWA during this time and Andrew McManus replaced him with Sid Vicious as the new Commissioner. Jeff Jarrett lost the WWA World Heavyweight Championship to Nathan Jones in a four-way match, also involving Brian Christopher and Scott Steiner on April 7. Jones then lost the title to Steiner at Eruption in a match in which Vicious served as the special outside enforcer and banned Jarrett from entering the arena.

Eddie Guerrero did not wrestle any other match for the company and did not join the Australian tour in April as he left WWA to join World Wrestling Federation, resulting in Guerrero being stripped off the International Cruiserweight Championship. The title was determined in a four-man tournament between A.J. Styles, Nova, Jerry Lynn and Chuckie Chaos at Eruption. Styles won the tournament to win the vacant title.

Sabu and Devon Storm continued their feud as the two competed in a steel cage match at Eruption, which Sabu won to end the feud.

== Results ==
No.	Results	Stipulations	Times
1	Nova defeated Low Ki, Shark Boy, A.J. Styles, Tony Mamaluke, and Christopher Daniels	Six-Way Elimination match	19:42
2	The Funkster defeated Reno	Singles match	07:34
3	KroniK (Brian Adams and Bryan Clark) defeated Native Blood (The Navajo Warrior and Ghost Walker)	Tag team match	04:51
4	Puppet the Midget Killer defeated Teo	Falls Count Anywhere match	07:38
5	Eddie Guerrero defeated Psicosis (c) and Juventud Guerrera	Triple Threat match for the WWA International Cruiserweight Championship	12:40
6	Devon Storm defeated Sabu (with Bill Alfonso)	No Disqualification match	20:39
7	Rick Steiner and The Cat defeated The West Hollywood Blondes (Lenny Lane and Lodi)	Tag team match	00:58
8	Jeff Jarrett (c) defeated Brian Christopher	Singles match for the WWA World Heavyweight Championship	13:17
(c) / – the champion(s) heading into the match

== See also ==
- List of WWA pay-per-view events
