= WWA Inception =

2002 World Wrestling All-Stars pay-per-view event

The Inception
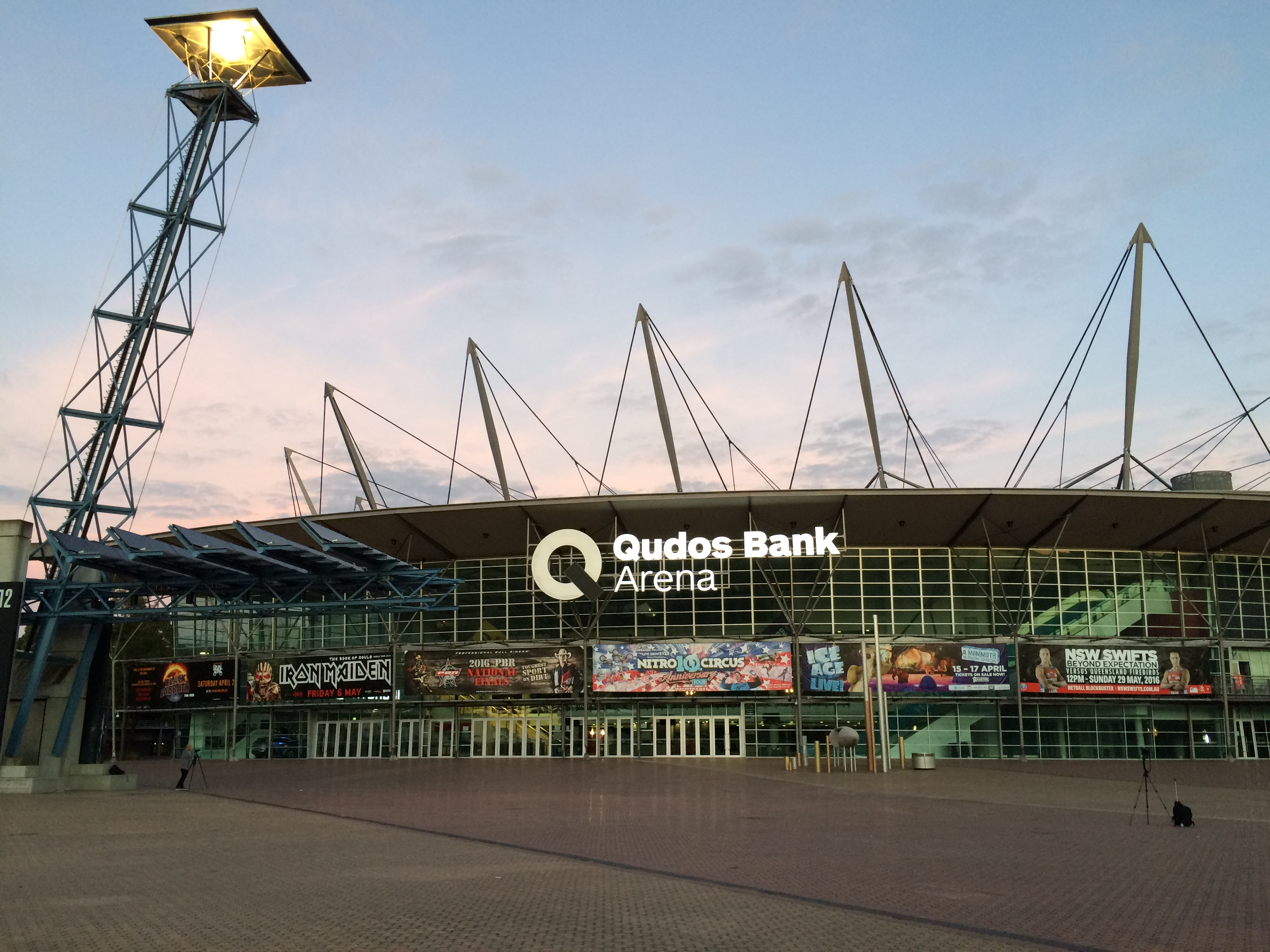
- Sydney Super Dome
- Promotion: World Wrestling All-Stars
- Date: October 26, 2001 (aired in US on January 6, 2002)
- City: Sydney, Australia
- Venue: Sydney Super Dome
- Attendance: 8,500

Pay-per-view chronology
← Previous; First	Next → The Revolution

The Inception was the first professional wrestling pay-per-view event produced by World Wrestling All-Stars (WWA). The event took place at the Sydney Super Dome in Sydney, Australia on October 26, 2001. The event was broadcast live on pay-per-view in Australia and via tape delay in the United States on January 6, 2002.

The event featured a Seven Deadly Sins tournament to crown a new World Heavyweight Champion after previous champion Road Dogg was stripped of the title, so a new champion could be crowned. Jeff Jarrett defeated Road Dogg in a Steel Cage match in the tournament final to win the vacant title. The event also featured a ladder match in the first round of the Seven Deadly Sins, in which Juventud Guerrera defeated Psicosis to win the vacant International Cruiserweight Championship.

Other featured matches on the card were Norman Smiley versus Crowbar in a Hardcore match and Gangrel versus Luna Vachon in a Black Wedding match.

== Production ==
=== Background ===
WWA was established in 2001 and the first tour of WWA was held in its native country Australia in October 2001 beginning from October 19 to October 27. The tour also included the company's first pay-per-view event Inception which took place on October 26.

=== Storylines ===
Inception featured professional wrestling matches that involved wrestlers from pre-existing scripted feuds, plots, and storylines that played out on WWA shows. Wrestlers portrayed heroes or villains as they followed a series of events that built tension and culminated in a wrestling match or series of matches.

On October 23, Road Dogg defeated Jeff Jarrett to become the inaugural WWA World Heavyweight Champion. On October 26, the title was vacated by the Commissioner Bret Hart and put for grabs to be defended in the Seven Deadly Sins tournament at Inception.

On October 19, Juventud Guerrera defeated Psicosis at WWA's first-ever show to become the inaugural WWA International Cruiserweight Champion. The title was vacated on October 23, so the title could be determined in a Ladder match at Inception. The ladder match was added in the quarter-final round of the Seven Deadly Sins tournament.

== Event ==
Other on-screen personnel
Role	Name
Commentators	Jerry Lawler
Commentators	Jeremy Borash
Commissioner	Bret Hart
Referee	Mark "Slick" Johnson
Interviewer	Stevie Ray

=== Quarterfinals ===
The opening match of the event was a ladder match, in which Juventud Guerrera took on Psicosis for the vacant International Cruiserweight Championship. The match was a part of the quarter-final round of the Seven Deadly Sins tournament for the vacant World Heavyweight Championship. Near the end of the match, Guerrera dropped Psicosis from the top of the ladder by powerbombing him on the mat and then nailed a 450° splash on Psicosis and then retrieved the title belt by climbing the ladder to win the title and advance to the semi-final round of the tournament.

Next, Road Dogg competed against Konnan in a Dog Collar match. Konnan nailed Dogg with a crowbar but Dogg countered it and hit Konnan with it and then grabbed him and touched all the four corners to win the match and advance to the next round.

Next, Norman Smiley took on Crowbar in a non-tournament hardcore match. The two brawled with each other throughout the ringside area. Near the end of the match, Crowbar placed Smiley on a pair of tables on the stage and then climbed the video screen and dived onto Smiley driving him through the tables. Smiley then rolled over Crowbar for the win.

Next, an open invitational battle royal took place in the quarter-final of the World Heavyweight Championship tournament, where Commissioner Bret Hart allowed all the employees of WWA to participate which included wrestlers and non-wrestlers. Buff Bagwell, Disco Inferno, Norman Smiley and Crowbar participated while non-wrestlers including interviewer Stevie Ray, commentators Jerry Lawler and Jeremy Borash, referees Mark "Slick" Johnson and Graham Young, announcer Sidney Ann, and a cameraman also participated in the match. Two people dressed as the Bananas in Pyjamas also interfered. Bagwell last eliminated Inferno after Inferno's security guards Lenny Lane and Lodi turned on him. As a result, Bagwell qualified for the semi-final round.

The last match in the quarter-final round was a Guitar on a Pole match between Nathan Jones and Jeff Jarrett. Jones was managed by Rove McManus for the match. Near the end of the match, Jones tried to retrieve the guitar but Jarrett hit a low blow to Jones and retrieved the guitar and then hit McManus with the guitar who tried to interfere. Jarrett then delivered a Stroke to Jones for the win.

=== Semifinals ===
The first semi-final match was scheduled to take place between Juventud Guerrera and Road Dogg but Guerrera sustained injuries during the ladder match and was thus unable to compete. Bret Hart then replaced Guerrera with Lenny Lane and Lodi, making it a three-way match. Dogg delivered a Shaky Knee Drop to both men for the win.

The next semi-final featured Buff Bagwell against Jeff Jarrett, where Bagwell was allowed to pick the match stipulation. He chose Tits, Whips, and Buff match featuring several women present at ringside acting as his lumberjills. Near the end of the match, Bagwell nailed a Buff Blockbuster to Jarrett and one of the lumberjills counted the pinfall but the referee who had left the ring to engage himself with the lumberjills did not allow the pinfall. This allowed Jarrett to hit a Stroke to Bagwell for the win.

Later, Luna Vachon took on Vampire Warrior in a Black Wedding match. Warrior avoided fighting Vachon but she continued to attack him which led to Warrior nailing an Impaler to Vachon for the win.

The penultimate match was a non-televised Skin to Win match, which Adara James won. The match also featured Danny Dominion competing in drag as Sharon A. Wad.

=== Final ===
The tournament final for the World Heavyweight Championship was a steel cage match between Road Dogg and Jeff Jarrett. Two referees were knocked out during the course of the match. Near the end of the match, Dogg snatched the title belt away from Bret Hart and attempted to hit Jarrett with it but Jarrett avoided it and hit a Stroke and Hart counted the pinfall, resulting in Jarrett winning the title. After the match, Jarrett tried to hit Hart with the title belt but Hart countered by applying a Sharpshooter on Jarrett.

== Reception ==
Scott Keith of 411Mania praised the event, considering it a positive effort by WWA to produce a good pay-per-view event. He considered Inception to be "a solid first effort from someone other than the WWF featuring a totally different style of wrestling with guys who are well above the green indy worker level and well below the age of hasbeens." He further added "this is a breath of fresh air in a stale PPV market with three really good matches justifying the price and solid entertainment all around."

Crazy Max staff criticized the event citing "insane booking and whacky finishes" but praised the International Cruiserweight Championship ladder match and the open invitational battle royal.

== Aftermath ==
WWA held its next tour in the United Kingdom starting from November 27 to December 11 and several matches from Inception evolved into rivalries that continued into the live events in the United Kingdom tour. Jeff Jarrett continued to defend the WWA World Heavyweight Championship against Road Dogg in the house show circuit. Brian Christopher and Road Dogg defeated Jarrett and Scott Steiner in tag team matches on December 3 and December 5 due to Christopher pinning Jarrett. Randy Savage was originally scheduled to be Jarrett's challenger at the next pay-per-view The Revolution but backed out of the event and Christopher was announced as his replacement on the account of his pinfall victories over Jarrett.

Juventud Guerrera and Psicosis continued their feud for the International Cruiserweight Championship. Guerrera successfully defended the title against Psicosis in rematches until Psicosis beat Guerrera for the title on December 8. At The Revolution, Psicosis defended the title against Guerrera and Eddie Guerrero in a three-way match, which Guerrero won to become the champion.

Gangrel defeated Luna Vachon in several Black Wedding rematches throughout the United Kingdom tour.

Norman Smiley and Crowbar continued their feud as the two exchanged wins in Tables matches throughout the United Kingdom tour.

== Results ==
No.	Results	Stipulations	Times
1	Juventud Guerrera defeated Psicosis	Ladder match for the vacant WWA International Cruiserweight Championship; WWA World Heavyweight Championship tournament quarter-final	08:11
2	Road Dogg defeated Konnan	Dog Collar match WWA World Heavyweight Championship tournament quarter-final	03:39
3	Norman Smiley defeated Crowbar	Hardcore match	09:54
4	Buff Bagwell won by last eliminating Disco Inferno (Note: Order of elimination: Jeremy Borash, Crowbar, Sidney Ann, Mark "Slick" Johnson, Graham Young, Stevie Ray, Jerry Lawler, Norman Smiley and Disco Inferno.)	Open Invitational Battle Royal; WWA World Heavyweight Championship tournament quarter-final	06:15
5	Jeff Jarrett defeated Nathan Jones (with Rove McManus)	Guitar on a Pole match WWA World Heavyweight Championship tournament quarter-final	04:07
6	Road Dogg defeated Lenny Lane and Lodi	Three-way match WWA World Heavyweight Championship tournament semi-final	03:56
7	Jeff Jarrett defeated Buff Bagwell	Tits, Whips, and Buff match WWA World Heavyweight Championship tournament semi-final	04:05
8	Gangrel defeated Luna Vachon	Black Wedding match	05:16
9	Adara James defeated Sharon A. Wad, Queen Bea, and Violet Terossi	4-Way Skin to Win match (Note: This match was removed from the American airing of the show.)	05:09
10	Jeff Jarrett defeated Road Dogg	Steel Cage match Tournament final for the vacant WWA World Heavyweight Championship	10:26

=== Seven Deadly Sins tournament bracket ===
Quarterfinals
Juventud Guerrera	N/A
Psicosis	8:11
Konnan	3:39
Road Dogg	N/A
(multiple)	6:15
Buff Bagwell	N/A
Jeff Jarrett	Pin
Nathan Jones	4:07

Semifinals
Lenny Lane and Lodi	3:56
Road Dogg	Pin
Buff Bagwell	4:05
Jeff Jarrett	Pin

Final
Road Dogg	10:26
Jeff Jarrett	Pin

- Juventud Guerrera was unable to compete after his Ladder match. The team of Lenny Lane and Lodi (The West Hollywood Blondes) were chosen to replace him.

== See also ==
- Professional wrestling in Australia
- List of professional wrestling organisations in Australia
- List of WWA pay-per-view events
