= WWA Reckoning =

The Reckoning
- Promotion: World Wrestling All-Stars
- Date: May 25, 2003
- City: Auckland, New Zealand
- Venue: North Shore Events Centre
- Attendance: 3,000

Pay-per-view chronology
| ← Previous; The Retribution | Next → Final |

The Reckoning was the fifth and final professional wrestling pay-per-view event produced by World Wrestling All-Stars (WWA). The event took place on May 25, 2003 at the North Shore Events Centre in Auckland, New Zealand. The event aired via tape delay in the United States on June 8, 2003.

Six professional wrestling matches were contested at the event. The main event was a title unification match between the WWA World Heavyweight Champion Sting and the NWA World Heavyweight Champion Jeff Jarrett, in which Jarrett defeated Sting to unify the WWA title into the NWA title. The WWA International Cruiserweight Championship was also unified into the TNA X Division Championship in a four-way match, with the X Division Champion Chris Sabin defeating International Cruiserweight Champion Jerry Lynn, Frankie Kazarian and Johnny Swinger to unify the titles.

== Event ==
=== Preliminary matches ===
The event kicked off with a match between Rick Steiner and Mark Mercedes. Mercedes cut a promo before the match in which he insulted New Zealand to gain heel heat. Steiner performed a diving bulldog on Mercedes for the win.

Next, Puppet took on Teo and Meatball in a three-way midget match. Near the end of the match, Puppet was sent out of the ring after Puppet and Meatball missed a double team move on Teo and Teo followed by hitting a tiger feint kick and a senton bomb for the win.

Next, Konnan took on Devon Storm in a hardcore match. Near the end of the match, Storm set up the guard rail and placed Konnan on it and then Storm hit a diving splash on Konnan for the win.

Later, a four-way title unification match took place in which the WWA International Cruiserweight Championship would be unified into the TNA X Division Championship, with the International Cruiserweight Champion Jerry Lynn competing against the X Division Champion Chris Sabin, Johnny Swinger and Frankie Kazarian. Near the end of the match, Lynn hit a cradle piledriver to Kazarian and covered him for the pinfall but Sabin broke up the pinfall and then Lynn and Swinger continued to brawl on the floor, allowing Sabin to hit a Future Shock on Kazarian to win the match and unify the International Cruiserweight Championship into the X Division Championship.

Next, Shane Douglas made his WWA debut and insulted the crowd and Sabu on the question if Extreme Championship Wrestling was built around Sabu or himself. He then claimed that he would beat Sabu but Joe E. Legend appeared and stopped Douglas from competing against Sabu and volunteered to take his place against Sabu and Douglas then provided color commentary for the match while Legend competed against Sabu in the predominant match. Near the end of the match, Sabu hit an Arabian Facebuster to Legend for the win. Douglas attacked Sabu with his cast after the match.

Former WWA Commissioner Bret Hart returned to WWA and cut an emotional promo discussing several aspects of his life and career including his stroke and paid tribute to the deceased Owen Hart, Davey Boy Smith, Curt Hennig, and Miss Elizabeth.

=== Main event match ===
The main event was a title unification match, in which the WWA World Heavyweight Champion Sting took on the NWA World Heavyweight Champion Jeff Jarrett. Joe E. Legend interfered in the match and tried to hit Sting with Jarrett's guitar but Rick Steiner snatched the guitar from Legend allowing Sting to hit three Stinger Splashes on Jarrett and Sting applied a Scorpion Deathlock. Steiner then turned on Sting by hitting him with the guitar, allowing Jarrett to win the match and unify the WWA World Heavyweight Championship into the NWA World Heavyweight Championship.

== Reception ==
Reckoning received mixed reviews from critics. Crazy Max staff wrote "Well the title unification matches were both good with the four way being more exciting. Other than that though nothing worth noting at all. Again another show that is good enough to sit through but not good enough to recommend."

Peter Kent of 411Mania gave mixed reviews on the event, praising the four-way title unification match and stating "if I were to make a 3 hour “Best of 2003” tape, I think this four way would be a great pick as the first match of the tape." He also praised the production quality and the great crowd reaction.

== Results ==
| No. | Results | Stipulations | Times |
|---|---|---|---|
| 1 | Rick Steiner defeated Mark Mercedes | Singles match | 3:49 |
| 2 | Teo defeated Meatball and Puppet | Triangle match | 3:14 |
| 3 | Devon Storm defeated Konnan | Hardcore match | 10:07 |
| 4 | Chris Sabin (TNA X Division) defeated Jerry Lynn (WWA International Cruiserweight), Johnny Swinger and Frankie Kazarian | Four-Way match to unify the TNA X Division and the WWA International Cruiserweight Championships | 14:16 |
| 5 | Sabu defeated Joe E. Legend | Singles match | 17:23 |
| 6 | Jeff Jarrett (NWA) defeated Sting (WWA) | Title Unification match to unify the NWA and the WWA World Heavyweight Championships | 13:41 |

== See also ==
- Professional wrestling in New Zealand
- List of WWA pay-per-view events
