= WWA World Heavyweight Championship (disambiguation) =

The WWA World Heavyweight Championship was a 2001–2003 wrestling promotion of the World Wrestling All-Stars. It may also refer to one of the following wrestling events run by other organizations called WWA:

- WWA World Heavyweight Championship (Indianapolis), a 1964–1980s promotion of the Indianapolis-based World Wrestling Association
- WWA World Heavyweight Championship (Los Angeles), a 1957–1968 promotion of the Worldwide Wrestling Associates
- WWA World Heavyweight Championship (Mexico), a 1986–2003 Lucha Libre promotion of the Tijuana-based World Wrestling Association
