= WWA Eruption =

Wrestling event

The Eruption
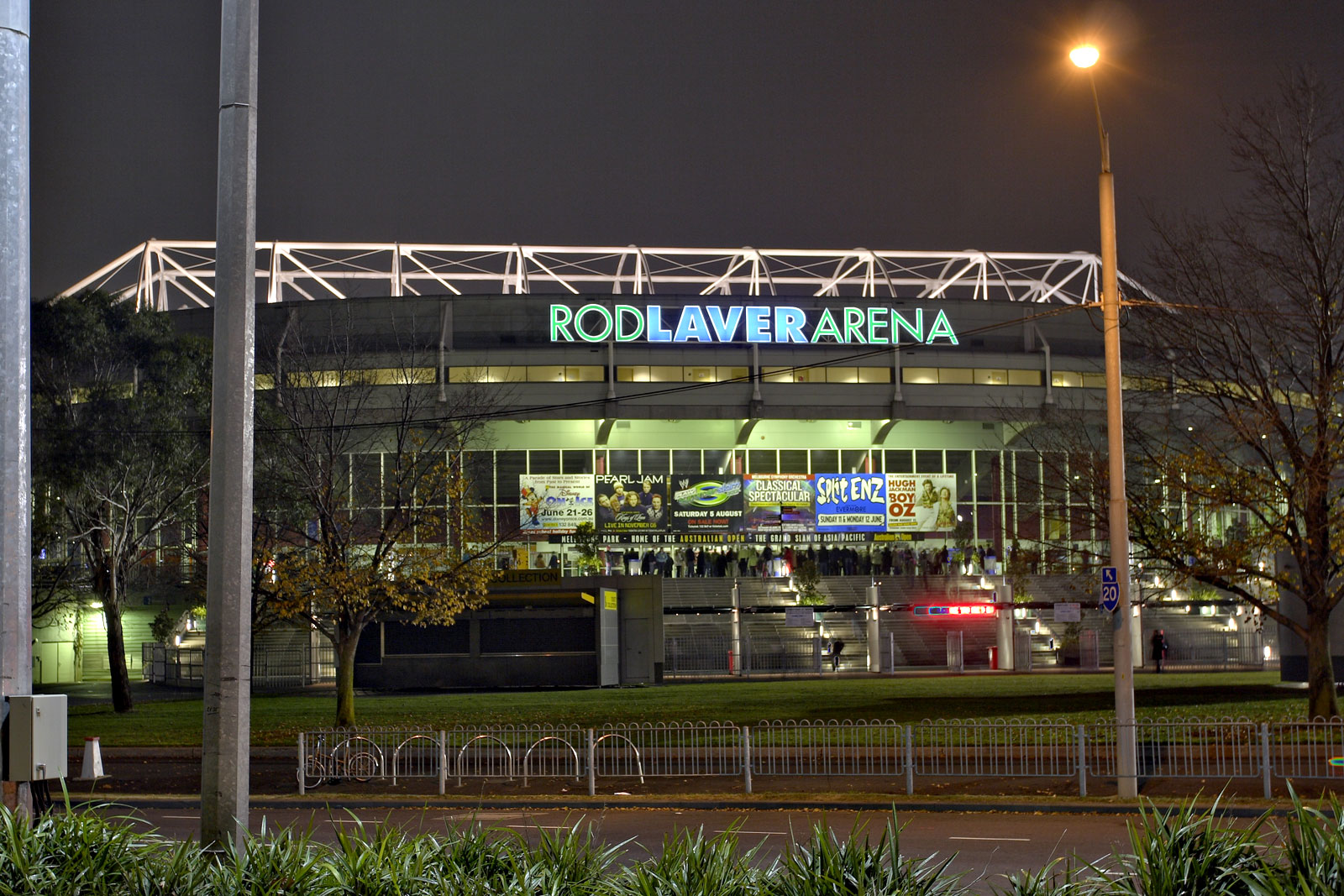
- Rod Laver Arena
- Promotion: World Wrestling All-Stars
- Date: April 13, 2002
- City: Melbourne, Victoria, Australia
- Venue: Rod Laver Arena

Pay-per-view chronology
← Previous; The Revolution	Next → The Retribution

The Eruption was the third professional wrestling pay-per-view event produced by World Wrestling All-Stars (WWA). The event took place on April 13, 2002 at the Rod Laver Arena in Melbourne, Victoria, Australia. The event aired in the United States via tape delay on April 14, 2002.

Nine professional wrestling matches were contested at the event. Nathan Jones defended the World Heavyweight Championship against Scott Steiner in the main event, with Sid Vicious serving as the special outside enforcer. Steiner defeated Jones to win the title. In other prominent matches on the event, Sabu defeated Crowbar in a steel cage match and A.J. Styles defeated Jerry Lynn in the finals of a tournament to win the vacant International Cruiserweight Championship, which had been vacated when previous champion Eddie Guerrero left WWA to join World Wrestling Federation.

== Event ==
Other on-screen personnel
Role	Name
Commentators	Jeremy Borash
Commentators	Disco Inferno
Commissioner	Sid Vicious

=== Preliminary matches ===
The event kicked off live with a two-round tournament for the vacant International Cruiserweight Championship. In the first tournament match, Nova took on A.J. Styles. Near the end of the match, Nova attempted to perform a Kryptonite Krunch on Styles but Styles countered it into a Styles Clash for the win.

In the next tournament match, Jerry Lynn took on Chuck E. Chaos. Chaos threw Lynn out of the ring with a bodyscissors and then dived onto him. Lynn then went to the ring and nailed a cradle piledriver for the win.

Next, Puppet the Psycho Dwarf took on Teo in a midget hardcore match. Near the end of the match, Teo put a garbage can on Puppet and hit a chair on the can. Teo then climbed a ladder and performed a splash from the top off the ladder onto Puppet for the win.

Next, Brian Christopher teamed with Ernest Miller to take on Buff Bagwell and Stevie Ray in a tag team match. Near the end of the match, Christopher and Miller took Ray out of the ring with a clothesline and hit a double chokeslam to Bagwell and Christopher nailed a Hip Hop Drop to Miller for the win.

Next, Allan Funk took on Pierre Ouellet. Near the end of the match, Ouellet hit a Cannonball and gained a near-fall. Funk mimicked Hulk Hogan's moves and mannerisms and hit a big boot, a piledriver and a leg drop to Ouellet for the win.

Next, A.J. Styles took on Jerry Lynn in the final of the tournament for the vacant International Cruiserweight Championship. Near the end of the match, Styles prevented Lynn from hitting a superplex and tossed him down on the mat and nailed a Spiral Tap on Lynn to win the vacant title.

Later, Sabu took on Devon Storm in a steel cage match. Near the end of the match, Sabu threw a chair at Storm and put him on a table. Sabu climbed the top of the cage and delivered a moonsault but the table did not break, so he climbed the top of the cage again and hit a diving leg drop to drive Storm through the table for the win.

The penultimate match of the event was an evening gown match between Midajah and Queen Bea. Midajah hit a scoop slam to Bea and removed her gown for the win. After the match, Puppet and Teo removed Midajah's gown and she chased them away.

=== Main event match ===
Nathan Jones defended the WWA World Heavyweight Championship against Scott Steiner in the main event and Commissioner Sid Vicious served as the special outside enforcer. Near the end of the match, Jones hit a chokeslam on Steiner and covered him for the pinfall but Midajah jumped on the referee to prevent the pinfall. Vicious then tried to hit a powerbomb on Midajah but several referees came to stop him from doing so. Steiner then hit Jones with the title belt and applied a Steiner Recliner on Jones to make him pass out to the hold and win the title.

== Reception ==
Greg of DDT Digest praised A.J. Styles' matches against Nova and Jerry Lynn in the International Cruiserweight Championship tournament and Sabu's match against Devon Storm but criticized WWA's production of the pay-per-view event with weak storylines and weak performances.

Crazy Max staff wrote "A pretty decent show here. The Styles/Nova match was a little to short to really get going but was good for what it was. The tag match was just awful with all four guys just totally sucking in the ring. I liked the three matches before the main event. The cage match being my favorite of those. The main event was ok. Obviously we weren’t going to get anything great from these guys but it was watchable yet again though we get a total clusterfuck of a finish."

== Results ==
No.	Results	Stipulations	Times
1	A.J. Styles defeated Nova	WWA International Cruiserweight Championship tournament semi-final	04:11
2	Jerry Lynn defeated Chuckie Chaos	WWA International Cruiserweight Championship tournament semi-final	01:10
3	Teo defeated Puppet the Psycho Dwarf	Hardcore match	05:22
4	Brian Christopher and Ernest Miller defeated Buff Bagwell and Stevie Ray	Tag team match	08:06
5	Allan Funk defeated Pierre Ouellet	Singles match	06:15
6	A.J. Styles defeated Jerry Lynn	Tournament final for the vacant WWA International Cruiserweight Championship	11:30
7	Sabu defeated Devon Storm	Steel Cage match	17:02
8	Midajah defeated Queen Bea	Evening Gown match	02:20
9	Scott Steiner (with Midajah) defeated Nathan Jones (c) via submission	Singles match for the WWA World Heavyweight Championship with Sid Vicious as special outside enforcer	14:40
(c) / – the champion(s) heading into the match

=== Tournament brackets ===
Semifinals
A.J. Styles	Pin
Nova	04:11
Jerry Lynn	Pin
Chuckie Chaos	01:10

Final
A.J. Styles	Pin
Jerry Lynn	11:30

== See also ==
- Professional wrestling in Australia
- List of professional wrestling organisations in Australia
- List of WWA pay-per-view events
