= List of WWA pay-per-view events =

This is a chronological list of the five pay-per-views promoted by World Wrestling All-Stars (WWA) between 2001 and 2003.

== Event dates and venues ==
Event	Date	City	Venue	Main Event	Ref.
The Inception	October 26, 2001	Sydney, New South Wales	Sydney Superdome	Jeff Jarrett vs. Road Dogg in a Steel Cage match for the new WWA World Heavyweight Championship	
The Revolution	February 24, 2002	Las Vegas, Nevada	The Aladdin Casino Center	Jeff Jarrett (c) vs. Grandmaster Sexay for the WWA World Heavyweight Championship	
The Eruption	April 14, 2002	Melbourne, Victoria	Rod Laver Arena	Scott Steiner vs. Nathan Jones (with Sid Vicious as special enforcer) for the vacant WWA World Heavyweight Championship	
The Retribution	December 6, 2002	Glasgow, Scotland	Scottish Exhibition and Conference Centre	Lex Luger vs. Sting for the vacant WWA World Heavyweight Championship	
The Reckoning	May 25, 2003	Auckland, New Zealand	North Shore Events Centre	NWA World Heavyweight Champion Jeff Jarrett vs. WWA World Heavyweight Champion Sting in a Title Unification match	
(c) – refers to the champion(s) heading into the match

== History ==
=== The Inception ===
The Inception was the first pay-per-view event by WWA, which took place at the Sydney Super Dome in Sydney, Australia on October 26, 2001. The event was broadcast live on pay-per-view in Australia and via tape delay in the United States on January 6, 2002.

The event featured a Seven Deadly Sins tournament to crown a new World Heavyweight Champion after previous champion Road Dogg was stripped of the title, so a new champion could be crowned. Jeff Jarrett defeated Road Dogg in a Steel Cage match in the tournament final to win the vacant title. The event also featured a ladder match in the first round of the Seven Deadly Sins, in which Juventud Guerrera defeated Psicosis to win the vacant International Cruiserweight Championship.

=== The Revolution ===
The Revolution was the second pay-per-view event by WWA, which took place on February 24, 2002, from the Aladdin Casino Center in Las Vegas, Nevada, United States.

Jeff Jarrett defended the World Heavyweight Championship against Brian Christopher in the main event. Jarrett was originally scheduled to defend the title against Randy Savage, but Savage no-showed the event and was replaced by Christopher. Jarrett retained the title. Also at the event, Eddie Guerrero defeated defending champion Psicosis and Juventud Guerrera in a triple threat match to capture the International Cruiserweight Championship.

=== The Eruption ===
The Eruption was the third pay-per-view event by WWA. The event took place on April 13, 2002, at the Rod Laver Arena in Melbourne, Australia. The event aired in the United States via tape delay on April 14, 2002.

Nathan Jones defended the World Heavyweight Championship against Scott Steiner in the main event, with Sid Vicious serving as the special outside enforcer. Steiner defeated Jones to win the title. In other prominent matches on the event, Sabu defeated Crowbar in a steel cage match and A.J. Styles defeated Jerry Lynn in the finals of a tournament to win the vacant International Cruiserweight Championship.

=== The Retribution ===
The Retribution was the fourth pay-per-view event by WWA. The event took place on December 6, 2002, at the Scottish Exhibition and Conference Centre in Glasgow, Scotland. The event aired in the United States on February 9, 2003, via tape delay.

Lex Luger defeated Sting in the main event to win the vacant WWA World Heavyweight Championship. Predominant matches on the undercard were a three-way match between Sabu, Simon Diamond and Perry Saturn and a title defense of the NWA World Heavyweight Championship by Jeff Jarrett against Nathan Jones.

=== The Reckoning ===
The Reckoning was the fifth and final pay-per-view by WWA. The event took place on May 25, 2003, at the North Shore Events Centre in Auckland, New Zealand. The event aired via tape delay in the United States on June 8, 2003.

The main event was a title unification match between the WWA World Heavyweight Champion Sting and the NWA World Heavyweight Champion Jeff Jarrett, in which Jarrett defeated Sting to unify the WWA title into the NWA title. The WWA International Cruiserweight Championship was also unified into the TNA X Division Championship in a four-way match, with the X Division Champion Chris Sabin defeating International Cruiserweight Champion Jerry Lynn, Frankie Kazarian and Johnny Swinger to unify the titles.

== See also ==
- List of All Elite Wrestling pay-per-view events
- List of ECW supercards and pay-per-view events
- List of FMW supercards and pay-per-view events
- List of Global Force Wrestling events and specials
- List of Impact Wrestling pay-per-view events
- List of Major League Wrestling events
- List of National Wrestling Alliance pay-per-view events
- List of NWA/WCW closed-circuit events and pay-per-view events
- List of NJPW pay-per-view events
- List of Smokey Mountain Wrestling supercard events
- List of WCW Clash of the Champions shows
- List of World Class Championship Wrestling Supercard events
- List of WWE pay-per-view and WWE Network events
- List of WWE Saturday Night Main Event shows
- List of WWE Tribute to the Troops shows
