= West Hollywood Blondes =

Professional wrestling tag team

Tag team
- Members: Lenny Lane; Lodi
- Name(s): Standards and Practices; West Hollywood Blondes; Lenny and Lodi; Lenny and Rave; Lane and Idol; XS
- Billed heights: 5 ft 10 in (1.78 m) - Lenny; 6 ft 2 in (1.88 m) - Lodi
- Combined billed weight: 444 lb (201 kg)
- Debut: June 1999
- Disbanded: 2002

The West Hollywood Blondes was a professional wrestling tag team consisting of Lenny Lane and Lodi. During their later careers in World Championship Wrestling, they were billed as "brothers". The team formed in 1999 as a parody of the original Hollywood Blonds. Their gimmick saw them entering the ring wearing glitter and licking Blow Pops. In the ring, they also devised a unique stalling vertical suplex, flying crossbody combination. After being removed from television by Turner Broadcasting System Standards and Practices, the team briefly reformed as Standards and Practices, a satirical reference to the S&P of Turner, before disbanding in 2000.

== History ==
=== World Championship Wrestling ===
In June 1999 Lenny approached Lodi and stated "They're not doing much with me and they're not doing much with you. Why don't we form a tag team?" Lane had been inspired by a Saturday Night Live vignette featuring "The Ambiguously Gay Duo". WCW management were initially reluctant, but booker Kevin Nash approved the idea, and Lane and Lodi were renamed The West Hollywood Blondes (as opposed to the more famous Hollywood Blonds, "Stunning" Steve Austin and Brian Pillman). The West Hollywood Blondes were implied to be homosexuals, wearing pink trunks emblazoned with large pink triangles (a symbol of the gay community) and with Lane sporting pigtails, facial glitter and a lollipop. Controversially, the West Hollywood Blondes were later revealed to be brothers. The West Hollywood Blondes were an effective heel tag team, though they rarely won matches.

In an upset victory, Lane defeated Rey Mysterio, Jr. on the August 19 episode of WCW Thunder in Lubbock, Texas to win the WCW World Cruiserweight Championship. With the assistance of Lodi, he defended the title successfully throughout the next six weeks. On the October 4 episode of WCW Monday Nitro, Psychosis was announced as having defeated Lane for the World Cruiserweight Championship at an unspecified house show. Lane had already been set to lose the title to Disco Inferno that night, but WCW management was worried about a possible incident. Lane didn't appear that night and Psychosis defended and lost the title to Disco instead.

The West Hollywood Blondes were taken off television in the same month following protests from the Gay and Lesbian Alliance Against Defamation, who threatened to organize a boycott of WCW, claiming that "The character of Lenny is presented with the intention to incite the crowd to the most base homophobic behavior" and "the audience's reaction [to Lenny Lane and Lodi being physically attacked by other wrestlers] gives permission to viewers to do harm to gay people in a very literal way."

They returned as "Standards and Practices", a censorious duo who opposed the "adult themes" present in WCW. In a drastic departure from their previous appearance, they wore designer suits, carried briefcases and were accompanied by a secretary, Miss Hancock. She would often stand in the ring or on the announcers table and do a sultry dance. This would distract not only their opponents but Lenny and Lodi as well. Miss Hancock later left Lenny and Lodi, and Standards and Practices became simply XS until their departure from WCW in 2000. Lane briefly reappeared for a short feud with The Wall, but was released once more.

=== Reformation ===
They were set to reunite for the debut of NWA Total Nonstop Action under their West Hollywood Blondes gimmick as the "Rainbow Express" with manager Joel Gertner, but Lodi suffered a neck injury and was replaced by Bruce.

Lenny and Lodi both made appearances for World Wrestling Allstars later on in their careers. They reunited in TNT Pro Wrestling in 2005 and 2006.

== Championships and accomplishments ==
- World Championship Wrestling
  - WCW Cruiserweight Championship (1 time) - Lenny Lane
