= WWA Retribution =

The Retribution
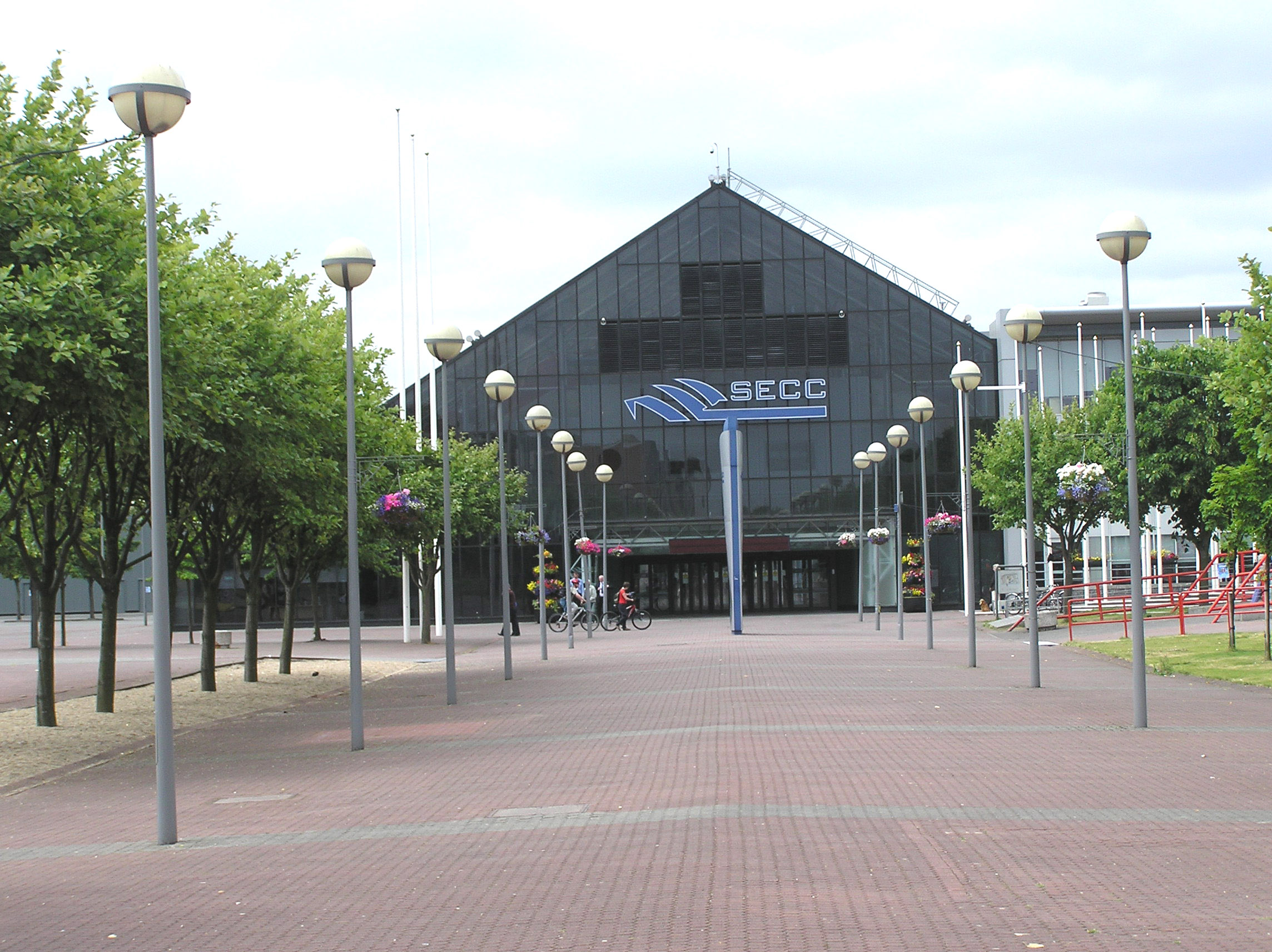
- Scottish Exhibition and Conference Centre
- Promotion: World Wrestling All-Stars
- Date: December 6, 2002
- City: Glasgow, Scotland
- Venue: Scottish Exhibition and Conference Centre
- Attendance: 3,000

Pay-per-view chronology
← Previous; The Eruption	Next → The Reckoning

The Retribution was the fourth professional wrestling pay-per-view event produced by World Wrestling All-Stars (WWA). The event took place on December 6, 2002 at the Scottish Exhibition and Conference Centre in Glasgow, Scotland. The event aired in the United States on February 9, 2003 via tape delay.

Eight professional wrestling matches were contested at the event. Lex Luger defeated Sting in the main event to win the vacant WWA World Heavyweight Championship after previous champion Scott Steiner vacated the title due to leaving WWA to join World Wrestling Entertainment. Predominant matches on the undercard were a three-way match between Sabu, Simon Diamond and Perry Saturn and a title defense of the NWA World Heavyweight Championship by Jeff Jarrett against Nathan Jones.

== Event ==
Other on-screen personnel
Role	Name
Commentators	Jeremy Borash
Commentators	Disco Inferno
Commissioner	Mike Sanders
Ring announcer	Jeremy Borash
Interviewer	Scott D'Amore

=== Preliminary matches ===
In the opening match, Shark Boy defeated Frankie Kazarian after performing a Dead Sea Drop.

Next, Nate Webb was scheduled to compete against Konnan in a match but Perry Saturn attacked him from behind by hitting a Northern Lights suplex, a powerbomb and a Death Valley driver and then applied a Rings of Saturn on Webb. Konnan then came and covered Webb for the pinfall and referee rang the bell and counted the pinfall to award the quick victory to Konnan.

Next, Norman Smiley and Malice took on Buff Bagwell and Johnny Swinger in a tag team match. Bagwell and Swinger attacked Smiley before even Malice made his entrance. Malice then joined the match to even the odds. Near the end of the match, Smiley tried to hit a Big Wiggle to Swinger but Swinger hit a low blow to Smiley and Bagwell performed a Buff Blockbuster on Smiley for the win.

Next, Teo took on Puppet in a hardcore match, with Midajah as the special guest referee. Teo hit a missile dropkick from the second rope and a senton bomb for the win. After the match, Perry Saturn attacked both men and kidnapped Midajah taking her away to the backstage.

Later, new Commissioner Mike Sanders took on Joe E. Legend. Near the end of the match, Legend tried to hit a Stone Cutter but Sanders pushed him off and hit a superkick for the win.

This was followed by Jeff Jarrett defending the NWA World Heavyweight Championship against Nathan Jones. Jones tried to hit a chokeslam to Jarrett but Jarrett pushed the referee in Jones' way, so Jones picked him up and threw him to the mat, which allowed Jarrett to hit Jones with a guitar for the win to retain the title.

In the penultimate match, Sabu took on Simon Diamond and Perry Saturn in a triple threat match. Teo and Puppet interfered in the match and hit Saturn with Singapore canes but Midajah stopped them, allowing Saturn to attack them. They ripped off Midajah's dress and ran off while Saturn covered Midajah and the two left the match and went to the backstage. Diamond then dived off the top rope but Sabu threw a chair at him and hit a triple jump moonsault for the win.

=== Main event match ===
Sting took on Lex Luger in the main event for the vacant World Heavyweight Championship. Near the end of the match, Luger pulled the referee in the way of a Stinger Splash attempt by Sting. Jeff Jarrett then interfered by hitting Sting with a guitar. Luger then applied a Torture Rack but Sting's foot hit the referee knocking him down again and then Sting countered the Torture Rack into a Scorpion Death Drop. Jarrett then hit Sting with a second guitar, allowing Luger to win the title.

== Reception ==
Retribution received mostly negative reviews from critics. Crazy Max staff gave negative reviews on the event and panned the event for Sting's first televised match in eighteen months ending in a loss.

Arnold Furious of 411Mania gave negative reviews to the event, rating it 4 out of 10 as he wrote "Some of it was alright and main event aside it didn't leave the "WCW" bad taste in the mouth. Some of the one night booking was pretty nonsensical. Like the Midajah situation. It's like a different person booked each one of her segments. I think they were probably expecting Sabu-Diamond-Saturn to be a show stealer but it would have worked better having a triple threat if it was entirely high fliers. Diamond's presence didn't really add to the match. It was one of the more spotty efforts on the night. The other being the opener. Jarrett & Jones did nothing. Sting & Luger did nothing. The formula tag was very bland. It seems like the entire company had no direction. You can understand them struggling a little as their champion got signed by the WWE but hey, it happens. Moving someone up the card was probably the answer rather than drafting in an out of shape Lex Luger to run a match that scraped over seven minutes and still blew up both participants. Thumbs down for this PPV. WWA was only ever really entertaining when it was copying successful achievements from elsewhere and even then it just came off as a second rate rip off."

== Results ==
No.	Results	Stipulations	Times
1	Shark Boy defeated Frankie Kazarian	Singles match	10:03
2	Konnan defeated Nate Webb	Singles match	00:03
3	Buff Bagwell and Johnny Swinger defeated Norman Smiley and Malice	Tag team match	10:00
4	Teo defeated Puppet	Hardcore match with Midajah as the special guest referee	03:20
5	Mike Sanders defeated Joe E. Legend	Singles match	09:12
6	Jeff Jarrett (c) defeated Nathan Jones	Singles match for the NWA World Heavyweight Championship	05:42
7	Sabu defeated Simon Diamond and Perry Saturn (with Midajah)	Triple Threat match	16:20
8	Lex Luger defeated Sting	Singles match for the vacant WWA World Heavyweight Championship	07:09
(c) / – the champion(s) heading into the match

== See also ==
- Professional wrestling in the United Kingdom
- List of WWA pay-per-view events
