= WWA International Cruiserweight Championship =

Professional wrestling championship

Details
- Promotion: World Wrestling All-Stars
- Date established: October 19, 2001
- Date retired: May 25, 2003
Statistics
- First champion(s): Juventud Guerrera
- Final champion(s): Chris Sabin
- Most reigns: Juventud Guerrera (2 reigns)
- Longest reign: Psicosis (78 days)
- Shortest reign: Chris Sabin (<1 day)
- Oldest champion: Jerry Lynn (39 years, 344 days)
- Youngest champion: Chris Sabin (21 years, 111 days)
- Heaviest champion: Eddie Guerrero (220lb (100kg))
- Lightest champion: Juventud Guerrera(165lb (75kg))

The World Wrestling All-Stars (WWA) International Cruiserweight Championship was the cruiserweight championship for the Australian based wrestling promotion World Wrestling All-Stars.

== History ==
The WWA International Cruiserweight Championship was first won by Juventud Geurrera by defeating Psicosis on October 19, 2001 in Perth, Australia. The title was vacated to be up for grabs on the company's first PPV, The Inception. The title was then won again by Juventud Guerrera. The title was unified with the TNA X Division Championship on May 25, 2003.

== Title history ==
Key
No.	Overall reign number
Reign	Reign number for the specific champion
Days	Number of days held

No.	Champion	Championship change			Reign statistics		Notes	Ref.
No.	Champion	Date	Event	Location	Reign	Days	Notes	Ref.
1	Juventud Guerrera	October 19, 2001	Live event	Perth, Australia	1	4	Defeated Psicosis to become the inaugural champion.	
—	Vacated	October 23, 2001	—	—	—	—	Championship became vacant to be defended in the Seven Deadly Sins tournament.	
2	Juventud Guerrera	October 26, 2001	Inception	Sydney, Australia	2	43	Defeated Psicosis in a Ladder match to win the vacant title. The match was a part of the Seven Deadly Sins tournament for the vacant WWA World Heavyweight Championship.	
3	Psicosis	December 8, 2001	Live event	Glasgow, Scotland	1	78		
4	Eddie Guerrero	February 24, 2002	Revolution	Las Vegas, Nevada	1	48	This was a triple threat match also involving Juventud Guerrera.	
—	Vacated	April 13, 2002	—	—	—	—	Championship became vacant when Eddie Guerrero left WWA for the World Wrestling Federation.	
5	A.J. Styles	April 13, 2002	Eruption	Melbourne, Australia	1	67	Defeated Jerry Lynn in a tournament final.	
—	Vacated	June 19, 2002	—	—	—	—	Championship became vacant when A.J. Styles left WWA for Total Nonstop Action Wrestling.	
6	Jerry Lynn	May 21, 2003	Live event	Sydney, Australia	1	4	Defeated Chris Sabin in a tournament final.	
7	Chris Sabin	May 25, 2003	Reckoning	Auckland, New Zealand	1	<1	This was a four-way title unification match, in which Sabin's TNA X Division Championship was also on the line. The match also involved Johnny Swinger and Frankie Kazarian.	
—	Unified	May 25, 2003	Reckoning	Auckland, New Zealand	—	—	The WWA International Cruiserweight Championship was unified into the TNA X Division Championship and retired as WWA closed after the event.	

== Combined reigns ==
Rank	Wrestler	No. of reigns	Combined days
1	Psicosis	1	78
2	AJ Styles	1	67
3	Eddie Guerrero	1	48
4	Juventud Guerrera	2	47
5	Jerry Lynn	1	4
6	Chris Sabin	1	<1

== See also ==
- Professional wrestling in Australia
- Championship unification
- TNA X Division Championship
