= Lenny Lane =

American professional wrestler

Personal information
- Born: Leonard Carlson; October 16, 1970 (age 55) Duluth, Minnesota, U.S.

Professional wrestling career
- Ring name(s): Lane Carlson; Lenni; Lenny Lane; Luscious Lenny
- Billed height: 6 ft 2 in (1.88 m)
- Billed weight: 220 lb (100 kg)
- Billed from: West Hollywood, California; Minneapolis, Minnesota
- Trained by: Eddie Sharkey
- Debut: January 28, 1995
- Retired: 2019

Leonard Carlson (born October 16, 1970) is an American former professional wrestler, better known by the ring name Lenny Lane. He is best known for his time with World Championship Wrestling (WCW) from 1997 to 2000, where he held the Cruiserweight Championship once.

== Professional wrestling career ==
=== Early career (1995–1997) ===
Carlson was trained by Eddie Sharkey and debuted in 1995. He worked in independent Minnesota promotions and Michinoku Pro Wrestling in Japan in late 1996.

=== World Championship Wrestling (1997–2000) ===
==== Early years (1997–1999) ====
He first appeared in World Championship Wrestling (WCW) as Lane Carlson, a jobber. He made his WCW debut on the April 14, 1997 episode of Monday Nitro by losing to the World Television Champion Ultimo Dragon. He later changed his ring name to Lenny Lane on the May 24 episode of Saturday Night during a match against Buff Bagwell, which Carlson lost. He began to wear boots marked "LL", possibly due to his resemblance to Lex Luger in his early days despite his smaller size. He made his pay-per-view debut at the 1998 Slamboree event as a participant in a battle royal to determine the number one contender for the World Cruiserweight Championship. He was eliminated by Juventud Guerrera. His first storyline saw him as Chris Jericho's lackey. He later began advertising a (fictional) product known as "Ab Solution Plus". It was a health drug that supposedly benefited the abdominal muscles. Lane picked up his first victory in WCW on the October 3 episode of Saturday Night against Lash LeRoux. He appeared in the World War 3 battle royal at the eponymous pay-per-view on November 22 for a future shot at the World Heavyweight Championship and Kevin Nash won the match.

==== West Hollywood Blondes and Standards and Practices (1999–2000) ====
In June 1999 he approached Lodi and stated "They're not doing much with me and they're not doing much with you. Why don't we form a tag team?" Lane had been inspired by a Saturday Night Live vignette featuring "The Ambiguously Gay Duo". WCW management were initially reluctant, but booker Kevin Nash approved the idea, and Lane and Lodi were renamed The West Hollywood Blondes (as opposed to the Hollywood Blonds, "Stunning" Steve Austin and Brian Pillman). The Blondes were implied to be homosexuals, wearing pink trunks emblazoned with large pink triangles (a symbol of the gay community) and with Lane sporting pigtails, facial glitter and a lollipop. Controversially, the Blondes were later revealed to be brothers. The Blondes were an effective villainous tag team, though they rarely won matches.

In an upset victory, Lane defeated Rey Mysterio, Jr. on the August 19 episode of WCW Thunder in Lubbock, Texas, to win the World Cruiserweight Championship. With the assistance of Lodi, he defended the title successfully including notably against Shaggy 2 Dope of the Insane Clown Posse over the next six weeks. On the October 3 episode of WCW Monday Nitro, Psychosis was announced as having defeated Lane for the World Cruiserweight Championship at an unspecified live event. Lane had already been set to drop the title to Disco Inferno that night, but WCW management was worried about a possible incident. Lane did not appear that night and Psychosis defended and lost the title to Disco instead.

The Blondes were taken off television in the same month following protests from the Gay and Lesbian Alliance Against Defamation, who threatened to organize a boycott of WCW, claiming that "the character of Lenny is presented with the intention to incite the crowd to the most base homophobic behavior" and "the audience's reaction [to Lenny Lane and Lodi being physically attacked by other wrestlers] gives permission to viewers to do harm to gay people in a very literal way."

Lane and Lodi returned as "Standards and Practices", a censorious duo who opposed the "adult themes" present in WCW. In a drastic departure from their previous appearance, they wore designer suits, carried briefcases and were accompanied by a secretary, Miss Hancock. Standards and Practices was supposedly an attempt to mock the conservative views of WCW management, and was not unlike the Right to Censor faction the WWF would have shortly afterwards due to complaints from the Parents Television Council over their programming. Miss Hancock eventually abandoned the team. Soon the gimmick of Standards and Practices were dropped on an edition of WCW Nitro when both Lane and Lodi stripped off their suit and tie. In the following weeks, they competed under the tag team name 2XS, a gimmick more resembling two hard rock party goers who wore just jeans to the ring and came out to theme music resembling something from Van Halen. Announcers also began calling Lodi "Idol" (his name backwards) during the matches. This gimmick too was short lived as they failed to get over, even in a tag team title match and were soon pulled off TV a few weeks later. Lane briefly reappeared for a short feud with The Wall, but was released once more. Both Lane and Lodi were released from WCW in August 2000.

=== Independent circuit (2000–2013, 2019) ===
After WCW, Lane returned to Minnesota in the summer of 2000. Then, Lane moved on to Texas Championship Wrestling, in April 2001, where he formed a tag team with Shane Helms, winning the TCW Tag Team Championships. The team was split when Helms was signed by the World Wrestling Federation. He also appeared on The AWA Stars Tour wrestling in the upper Midwest with Jim Brunzell, Buck "Rock n' Roll" Zumhofe, Sheik Adnan Al-Kaissy, Mantaur, and others. The Blondes reunited in the now defunct World Wrestling All-Stars promotion in late 2001.

Lane competed for Steel Domain Wrestling throughout 2003, and for the New Age Wrestling Alliance in 2004 and early 2005. He also works for the American Wrestling League, which is in the same TV slot and wrestles in the same venues as Steel Domain Wrestling did.

Lenny Lane currently owns and wrestles for Prime Time Wrestling, an independent wrestling promotion out of Bloomington, Minnesota. He main evented the first show in September defeating Mitch Paradise. In January 2012, Lenny Lane defeated Chiropractor DC to become the first PTW Champion. He would later lose it to him in May. In September, Lenny Lane would defeat Renny D to become the only two-time PTW champion but would lose it to Black Stallion on the same night. In May 2013, Lane defeated Ariya Daivari to become the only three-time PTW Champion. In December of that year a match would take place between John Johnson and Renny D which Renny D would win. Lenny Lane would then award the PTW Championship to Renny D making him a two-time champion.

On November 30, 2019, Lane returned for a one-night appearance at WrestleCade in a battle royal won by Jax Dane.

=== Total Nonstop Action Wrestling (2002) ===
Lane was signed by Total Nonstop Action Wrestling (Lodi would have been signed too, but he was injured) and debuted on June 19, 2002. Lane formed a short-lived tag team with Bruce known as The Rainbow Express and competed on the second-ever TNA pay-per-view on June 26. Lane sustained an injury, however, and the team split on November 20, 2002, after Bruce turned on Lane. He left TNA soon after.

=== World Wrestling Entertainment (2004, 2008) ===
Lane appeared on the October 31, 2004 edition of WWE Heat teaming with Ken Anderson against Rob Conway and Sylvain Grenier.

On September 30, 2008, Lane appeared on the edition of WWE ECW losing to Jack Swagger.

== Championships and accomplishments ==
- French Lakes Wrestling Association
  - FLWA South Haven Championship (1 time)
  - FLWA Tag Team Championship (1 time)
- Minnesota Independent Wrestling
  - MIW Heavyweight Championship (1 time)
- New Age Wrestling Alliance
  - Dallas/Fort Worth Championship (1 time)
- Northern Premier Wrestling
  - NPW Heavyweight Championship (2 times)
- Prime Time Wrestling
  - PTW Heavyweight Championship (3 times)
- Pro Wrestling Illustrated
  - Ranked No. 188 of the top 500 singles wrestlers in the PWI 500 in 1999.
- Steel Domain Wrestling
  - SDW World Heavyweight Championship (1 time)
- Texas Championship Wrestling
  - TCW Texas Tag Team Championship (1 time) – with Shane Helms
- World Championship Wrestling
  - WCW Cruiserweight Championship (1 time)
- XJAM Pro Wrestling
  - XJAM Heavyweight Championship (1 time)
  - XJAM X Championship (1 time)
