= Mark Mercedes =

Australian professional wrestler and promoter

Personal information
- Born: Manly, New South Wales

Professional wrestling career
- Ring name(s): Mark Mercedes; Mark the Bushranger; Mark the Hunter; Mark McKay
- Billed from: Rose Bay, New South Wales
- Trained by: Larry Malenko; Dean Malenko; Joe Malenko
- Debut: 1992
- Retired: 2016

Mark Mercedes is an Australian professional wrestler and promoter, currently owning and promoting the International Wrestling Australia he was one of the few Australians to wrestle for World Championship Wrestling and World Wrestling All-Stars.

== Professional wrestling career ==
=== Early years and training ===
He became an amateur wrestler when he was 18 and shortly won the City of Sydney, New South Wales State and Australian Championships and competed in Olympic game trials then gained his initial professional wrestling training at the Malenko's Wrestling School in Florida in 1992.

=== International exploits ===
==== World Championship Wrestling ====
In 1993 he worked on WCW Saturday Night and WCW WorldWide and wrestled Rick Rude on WCW Television Programs he also performed on WCW Monday Nitro and wrestled Rick Martel in front of 30,000 fans at the Georgia Dome in Atlanta. Mercedes performed in dark matches on the 2000 WCW Australian Tour.

==== Europe ====
Mercedes wrestled for Catch Wrestling Association on a seven-month tour in 1997

==== New Zealand and World Wrestling All-Stars ====
In 1993 Mercedes was on the New Zealand Grand Prix National Wrestling Tour and he appeared on a worldwide pay-per-view event WWA: The Reckoning and lost to Rick Steiner.

==== Japan ====
He went on tour with Muga World Pro Wrestling now known as Dradition Pro-Wrestling in 2006 and 2007

== Championships and accomplishments ==
- Australian Championship Wrestling
  - ACW Australian Heavyweight Championship (1 time)
- International Wrestling Australia
  - IWA Heavyweight Championship (12 times)
  - IWA Tag Team Championship (1 time)
  - IWA Trans Tasman Championship (2 times)
  - IWA South Pacific Heavyweight Championship (1 time)
- Pro Wrestling Illustrated
  - Ranked No. 396 of the top 500 singles wrestlers in the PWI 500 in 2002
