= World Wrestling All-Stars =

Australian professional wrestling promotion

- Trade name: World Wrestling All-Stars
- Type: Private
- Industry: Professional wrestling
- Founded: October 2001; 24 years ago in Brisbane, Queensland, Australia
- Defunct: May 2003; 23 years ago
- Headquarters: Brisbane, Queensland, Australia
- Key people: Andrew McManus (World Manager and Director); Jeremy Borash (Director of Talent)
- Products: Live events; Merchandise; Home video
- Owner: Andrew McManus

World Wrestling All-Stars (WWA) was a professional wrestling promotion founded by Australian concert promoter Andrew McManus in 2001. The promotion was operated by McManus' International Touring Company. WWA was one of several promotions to come into existence shortly after the closings of Extreme Championship Wrestling (ECW) and World Championship Wrestling (WCW). The company was in existence from October 2001 to May 2003.

== History ==
WWA recruited former WCW ring announcer Jeremy Borash as booker and head of talent for its shows. He also acted as ring announcer and commentator for their shows. Borash was recommended to the WWA by Vince Russo, who was not able to work with the company as originally planned. WWA focused on signing the wrestlers that did not get signed by the World Wrestling Federation (WWF) after the WWF-WCW merger. They aimed to fill the gap left by the demise of World Championship Wrestling and Extreme Championship Wrestling and provide an alternative to the WWF.

Many popular former WWF and WCW wrestlers wrestled for the company during its nearly two-year existence. These included Jeff Jarrett, Road Dogg, Scott Steiner, Sting, Psicosis, Devon Storm, Juventud Guerrera, Rick Steiner, Jerry Lynn, Shane Douglas, Buff Bagwell, Lex Luger, Stevie Ray, Sabu and Disco Inferno.

They also brought in relatively unknown wrestlers, many of whom went on to make names for themselves for other promotions like TNA. These included Low Ki, A.J. Styles, Christopher Daniels, Frankie Kazarian, Shark Boy, and Nathan Jones (known as "the Colossus of Boggo Road). Further big names like Kevin Nash, Scott Hall, and Randy Savage were scheduled to appear for WWA at some point but their appearances did not happen. The promotion had three in ring commissioners during its time, namely Bret Hart, Sid Vicious and Mike Sanders.

=== First tour and the Inception PPV ===
The WWA held its first tour in October 2001, covering dates across Australia. During this time the Road Dogg defeated Jeff Jarrett to become the first WWA World Champion. However, the title was then vacated to allow for it to be competed for during a title tournament at their first PPV, Inception. This tournament involved 4 quarterfinals matches (one of which was a battle royal), 2 semi-finals and a final held inside a steel cage.

This debut PPV was held inside a full-sized arena in Sydney and production values were of a decent standard. However, the event was universally panned by the critics for being short at 2 hours overall and various matches being too short to be able to run to their full potential. The use of 2000 era WCW style comic story lines also did little to endear themselves to the viewing public as a serious alternative to the WWF.

Some such comic storylines involved Australian kids TV performers, The Fruits in Suits (who were a parody of The Bananas in Pyjamas), interfering in matches and former WCW joke team Lenny Lane and Lodi being allowed to compete in the semi-final after an injury forced Juventud Guerrera to withdraw. The final of the title tournament saw the Road Dogg face Jeff Jarrett. Commissioner Bret Hart was at ringside for the match and interfered on a number of occasions to prevent anyone winning the match using his sharpshooter move. In the end Jarrett won the match with his trademark guitar shot and became the champion.

=== UK and Ireland tour ===
Next the WWA toured the UK and Ireland in December 2001. This tour largely included the same line up as the Inception PPV tour. Additions to the card were former WCW World Heavyweight Champion Scott Steiner and former WWF tag team competitor Brian Christopher. Although the events drew several thousand fans at times the WWA failed to consistently draw large crowds. The main event on this tour was usually Jeff Jarrett versus Road Dogg versus Scott Steiner for the title in a three-way dance. Jarrett successfully defended his title each time.

=== Revolution PPV ===
On 24 February 2002, the WWA held its second PPV, Revolution. It was the promotion's first and only event to take place in the USA.

This event took place in the Aladdin Casino in Las Vegas, Nevada. This was a smaller venue, which reflected upon the look and style of the show.

Months before the event, initial advertisements plugged the reunion of Scott Hall and Kevin Nash. However, this did not happen due to both men signing contracts to return to the WWF. Then Randy Savage was advertised to be appearing in the main event against Jeff Jarrett for the WWA Heavyweight Championship. Savage backed out of the event during the weekend and this wasn't announced until the pre-show where a big red "X" and the text "NOT APPEARING" was overlaid on all images of Savage. Road Dogg, also heavily advertised for this show, did not appear either although this was not told to the fans during the pre-show. Andrew McManus opened the show with a prepared statement in his office, confirming that Savage would not be appearing. Bret Hart appeared after the opening match as the WWA Commissioner. He announced to the live crowd that Randy Savage was not at the show and was being replaced in the main event by Brian Christopher.

An amount of significant talent was arguably underutilized on the show. Former WCW World Tag Team Champions KroniK wrestled an unknown Native-American gimmick tag team called Native Blood and defeated them in less than five minutes. Former WCW World Heavyweight Champion Scott Steiner showed up, only to cut a quick promo and beat Disco Inferno in a two-minute match. Eddie Guerrero became the WWA International Cruiserweight Champion by defeating Juventud Guerrera and Psicosis. After the match, former ECW World Heavyweight Champion Jerry Lynn made an appearance to confront Guerrero. This was a genuine surprise, as few knew he had been released from his WWF contract before his appearance on this show. Rick Steiner and Ernest Miller defeated Lenny and Lodi in a match that only lasted 58 seconds. Larry Zbyszko showed up to cut a promo on Vince McMahon challenging him to a fight and talking about Chris Jericho, who was WWF Champion at the time, saying that he stole Zbyszko's "Living Legend" moniker. He mocked Jericho by accusing him of "being too short to be a world champion", despite Zbyszko actually being shorter in height than Jericho himself.

Jarrett defeated Christopher in the main event to retain the title.

=== Eruption PPV and Australian tour ===
In April the WWA returned to Australia for a tour and to film its third PPV, Eruption. During this tour Nathan Jones won the WWA title after winning a 4 corners match against Jeff Jarrett, Scott Steiner and Brian Christopher.

The Eruption PPV was held at the Rod Laver Arena in Melbourne, Australia. The show started with Jeff Jarrett being escorted away from the building proclaiming he would be back (Jarrett never appeared after this). It presumed this was prerecorded earlier in the week. A new Cruiserweight Champion was crowned at the show after Eddie Guerrero had returned to the WWF; A.J. Styles defeated Jerry Lynn in the tournament final to win the title. Another match of note was a cage match between Sabu and Devon Storm. Sabu won the match after leaping from the top of the cage onto Devon Storm, who was laid on top of a double deck of tables. In the main event Scott Steiner defeated Nathan Jones to win the title. He would later give up the title to sign with the WWF.

A further UK and European tour was planned for after this event. The WWA postponed the tour from May 2002 to November 2002, citing injuries to its major stars as the reason. However, it is believed that poor ticket sales may be the true reason.

=== Retribution PPV and European tour ===
The WWA toured the UK in December 2002, filming Retribution PPV in Glasgow Scotland. The WWA title remained vacant for the first half of the tour, with it being held up to be decided at the PPV. Mike Sanders took over as commissioner for this tour and fought Joe E. Legend each night. Memorable matches on this tour included a three-way hardcore match including Sabu, Perry Saturn and Simon Diamond.

Retribution was broadcast in February 2003. The card included nine matches and two title matches (WWA and TNA), but only ran for 1 hour 45 minutes. This was fifteen minutes shorter than the house show in Newcastle the night before, which only included six matches and no title matches.

This tour included an infamous dispute with a seemingly badly out of shape Lex Luger. He reportedly missed shows due to illness and refused to wrestle for more than five minutes in matches, despite being in the main events. He faced Sting for the vacant WWA title at the PPV. This match was poorly received and only lasted about 7 minutes, which largely involved Luger pacing around and avoiding wrestling. Luger won this match and became WWA Champion after an interference from Jeff Jarrett with his guitar. He lost this title to Sting a few days later at a house show in Zurich, Switzerland.

=== Final tour and Reckoning PPV ===
In May 2003, the WWA embarked on its final tour. This visited Australia and New Zealand. The Reckoning PPV was held in Auckland in front of a vocal crowd. It was the first to include replays and split screen shots. Before the PPV the decision had been made to fold the WWA, hence the titles were to be unified with the NWA and TNA titles. Chris Sabin won a four corners cruiserweight match to unify the TNA X Division and WWA Cruiserweight titles. In the main event, Sting was defeated by NWA World Heavyweight Champion Jeff Jarrett to unify the NWA and WWA World titles.

== Championships ==
- WWA World Heavyweight Championship – last held by Jeff Jarrett; unified with Jarrett's NWA Worlds Heavyweight Championship
- WWA International Cruiserweight Championship – last held by Chris Sabin; unified with Sabin's TNA X Division Championship
- WWA Hardcore Championship – Devon Storm defeated Danny Dominion in a tables match to win the title on October 25, 2001 in Wollongong, Australia. Title was then abandoned.

== Alumni ==
=== Male ===
- A.J. Styles
- Brian Adams
- Brian Christopher
- Bryan Clark
- Buff Bagwell
- Chris Sabin
- Christopher Daniels
- Chuckie Chaos
- Crowbar
- Danny Dominion
- Disco Inferno
- Eddie Guerrero
- Ernest Miller
- The Funkster
- Gangrel
- Ghost Walker
- Jeff Jarrett
- Jerry Lynn
- Joey Legend
- Johnny Swinger
- Juventud Guerrera
- Kazarian
- Konnan
- Lenny Lane
- Lex Luger
- Lodi
- Low Ki
- Malice
- Mark Mercedes
- Mike Sanders
- Nate Webb
- Nathan Jones
- The Navajo Warrior
- Norman Smiley
- Nova
- PCO
- Psicosis
- Reno
- Rick Steiner
- Road Dogg
- Sabu
- Saturn
- Scott D'Amore
- Scott Steiner
- Shane Douglas
- Shark Boy
- Simon Diamond
- Stevie Ray
- Sting
- Tony Mamaluke

=== Female ===
- Adara James
- Luna Vachon
- Midajah
- Queen Bea
- The Nitro Girls
- Violet Terossi

=== Others ===
- Bret Hart - First WWA Commissioner
- Sid Vicious - Second WWA Commissioner
- David Penzer - Ring announcer
- Mark Johnson - Referee
- Bill Alfonso - Manager of Sabu
- Hiroyoshi Tenzan - Sat ringside at the WWA The Revolution pay-per-view, later attacking Disco Inferno.
- Larry Zbyszko - Made an appearance at the WWA The Revolution pay-per-view, challenging Vince McMahon to a street fight.

=== Broadcast team ===
- Jeremy Borash - Play-by-Play commentator (also booker)
- Mark Madden - Color commentator
- Jerry Lawler - Color commentator (also occasional wrestler)
- Rove McManus - Backstage interviewer

== See also ==
- List of WWA pay-per-view events
- List of professional wrestling organisations in Australia
- Professional wrestling in Australia
  - I-Generation Superstars of Wrestling
  - World Championship Wrestling
