= Disco Inferno (wrestler) =

American professional wrestler (born 1967)

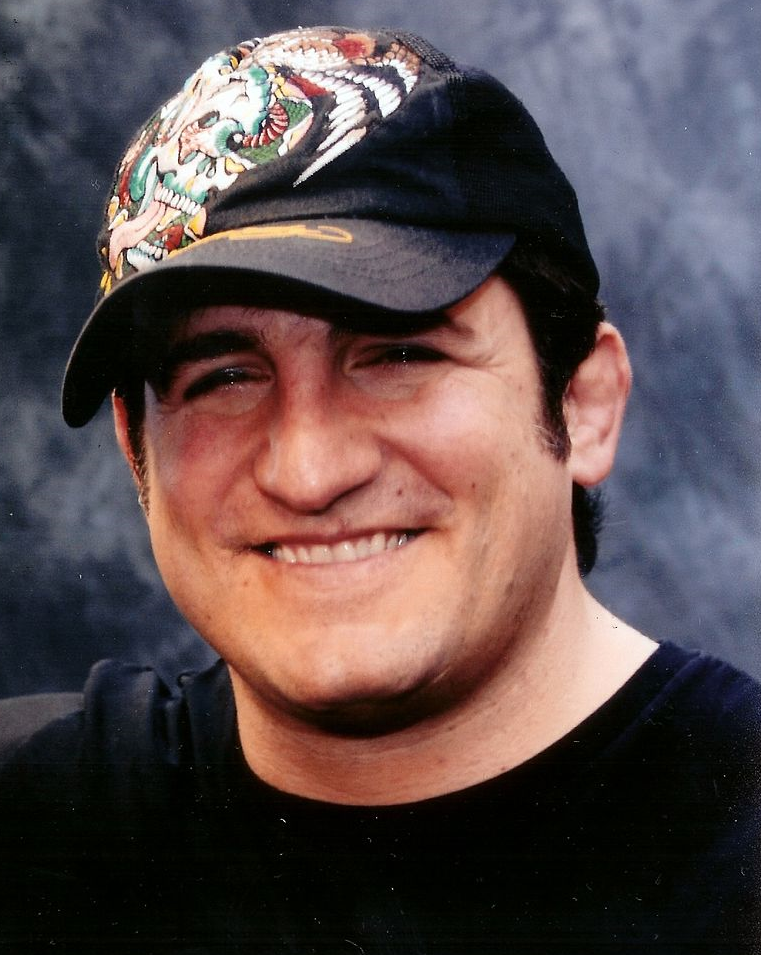
- Disco Inferno in 2008

Personal information
- Born: Glenn Gilbertti; November 12, 1967 (age 58) New York City, U.S.
- Education: University of Georgia

Professional wrestling career
- Ring name(s): Disco Inferno; Disqo; Glenn Gilberti; Glenn Gilbertti; Hip Hop Inferno; La Cucaracha
- Billed height: 6 ft 1 in (185 cm)
- Billed weight: 240 lb (109 kg)
- Billed from: Atlanta, Georgia; Brooklyn, New York
- Trained by: Steve Lawler
- Debut: 1991
- Retired: 2021

Glenn Gilbertti (born November 12, 1967) is an American professional wrestler, writer and booker, best known for his appearances with World Championship Wrestling as Disco Inferno (briefly changed to Disqo) from 1995 to 2001.

During his six-year tenure with WCW, Gilbertti became a one-time Cruiserweight Champion, a two-time Television Champion and a one-time Tag Team Champion with Alex Wright.

In addition to his in-ring professional wrestling career, Gilbertti has also been a writer and booker for WCW and Total Nonstop Action Wrestling.

== Early life and education ==
Gilbertti was born in Brooklyn, New York City, and grew up in Marietta, Georgia, from the age of three. He is of Italian descent. He was a star youth soccer player before briefly attending college at Georgia Tech, eventually earning degrees in business and communications from the University of Georgia. The week after graduation, he tried out as a wrestler and "never looked back."

== Professional wrestling career ==
=== Early career (1991–1995) ===
Gilbertti started wrestling in 1991 wrestling his first match on November 20, 1991. He wrestled on the Georgia independent circuit, where he was best known for his time with Great Championship Wrestling (GCW) where he won several titles. He also had a short stint with the United States Wrestling Association (USWA) in 1993.

=== World Championship Wrestling (1995–2001) ===
==== Mid-card (1995–1996) ====
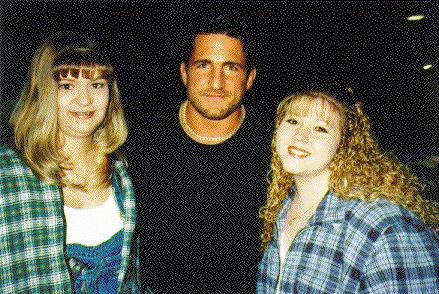
Disco Inferno with two fans during his time in WCW

Gilbertti made his name in World Championship Wrestling (WCW) as Disco Inferno, named after The Trammps' song and inspired by John Travolta's character Tony Manero in Saturday Night Fever. Gilbertti credits Raven for the birth of the "Disco Inferno" character. He annoyed the audience with his disco dancer character, which included dancing on the way to the ring and during his matches, the punchline being that fans would chant "Disco sucks!". He would come out and dance to his entrance music called "Disco Fever", written by Jimmy Hart.

Gilbertti signed a contract with WCW in 1995 and debuted later that same year. He gradually rose to mid-card status as a tweener, with his gimmick being that he would forget how to apply his finishing hold, a standing figure four leglock. Often, he would bring a cheat sheet with a diagram on how to apply the hold to the ring. He mostly competed in the WCW's shows Saturday Night, Main Event and WorldWide that mainly featured mid-card wrestlers . Inferno wrestled on many editions of Main Event before pay-per-view events against superstars such as Joey Maggs and Eddie Guerrero. He also competed on January 23, 1996 Clash of the Champions XXXII in a losing effort to Kevin Sullivan. Inferno made his pay-per-view debut at Slamboree 1996: Lord of the Ring in a tag team contest where he teamed up with Alex Wright against Dick Slater and Earl Robert Eaton.

==== Face push (1996–1997) ====
Although primarily used as a mid-card level talent, Disco started getting over with the fans, some of whom instead of chanting "Disco Sucks", would dance as Disco Inferno made his way to the ring. As such he received a push in the cruiserweight division by mid-1996. He began a feud with Cruiserweight Champion Dean Malenko and unsuccessfully challenged him for the title at Bash at the Beach. At World War 3, he participated in the three ring, 60 man battle royal with the winner receiving a shot at the World Heavyweight Championship. Inferno was injured in early 1997 and he took some time off before returning in September. His injury was mentioned after Disco refused to lose to Jacqueline because she was a woman.

Disco then feuded with Alex Wright, who began dancing before his entrance to mock Disco. Disco was booked to win the WCW World Television Championship from Wright on September 22 edition of Monday Nitro. Disco lost to Jacqueline at Halloween Havoc. He engaged in a feud with Perry Saturn after losing the Television title to Saturn on November 3 episode of Nitro. Disco lost to Saturn in a rematch at World War 3, before regaining the title from Saturn in a rematch on the December 8 episode of Nitro. Four weeks later, he dropped the title to Booker T.

==== The Dancing Fools ====
After having two reigns as Television Champion, Disco once again became an enhancement talent and a mid-carder in the cruiserweight division. He defeated La Parka at SuperBrawl VIII. He patched up things with former rival Alex Wright, thus turning into a villain in the process and the duo formed a tag team of dancers known as Dancing Fools. The team was used for comedy relief and often danced before their entrance. They were also joined by fellow dancer Tokyo Magnum. At Bash at the Beach, Inferno lost a match to Konnan. Inferno and Wright feuded with teams such as The Public Enemy (Johnny Grunge and Rocco Rock), and The British Bulldog and Jim Neidhart.

==== nWo Wolfpac ====
After not getting any success, Inferno and Wright split and began focusing on their singles careers again. Inferno started a feud with Juventud Guerrera and defeated him at Halloween Havoc to become the number one contender to the Cruiserweight Championship. He earned his title shot later that night against champion Billy Kidman but lost the match. At World War 3, he participated in the three ring, 60-man battle royal with the winner getting a shot at the World Heavyweight Championship at Starrcade, but the battle royal was won by Kevin Nash. Later at Starrcade, Disco along with Bam Bam Bigelow and Scott Hall assisted Nash in ending Goldberg's 173 match winning streak in the main event of Starrcade. Inferno became allied with, although he never joined the nWo Wolfpac until after the reunion. Around that time, Disco feuded with the likes of Booker T, Konnan, Buff Bagwell and Ernest Miller.

Gilbertti later said that the nWo storyline and working with Hall was the highlight of his career.

==== The Mamalukes enforcer ====
Inferno won the Cruiserweight Championship from Psychosis on October 4, 1999, edition of Nitro. He entered a program with Lash LeRoux and had a successful title defense against LeRoux at Halloween Havoc. He was joined by a new ally Tony Marinara. Inferno dropped the Cruiserweight title to Evan Karagias at Mayhem after Inferno accidentally attacked Marinara. Marinara joined The Mamalukes, while Disco was joined by LeRoux. At Starrcade, Disco and LeRoux lost to Mamalukes after Disco accidentally attacked LeRoux. Disco aligned with Mamalukes and became an enforcer for the duo.

==== The Filthy Animals and heel incarnation ====
In spring 2000, Eric Bischoff and Vince Russo "rebooted" WCW and the New Blood was formed. Disco joined The Mamalukes, then the Filthy Animals, renaming himself Hip Hop Inferno and then Disqo (a pun on R&B singer Sisqó, whose single "Thong Song" was a major hit at the time). The Filthy Animals feuded with Misfits in Action and Disqo unsuccessfully challenged Lieutenant Loco for the Cruiserweight Championship at The Great American Bash.

In June 2000, Gilbertti assisted in the booking of the WCW shows. During that time, the booking committee consisted of Gilbertti, Vince Russo, Bill Banks, Ed Ferrara, and Terry Taylor.

At New Blood Rising, Disqo refereed a fatal four-way match for the World Tag Team Championship, which KroniK won. At Fall Brawl 2000, Filthy Animals fought Natural Born Thrillers to a no contest in an elimination match. During the match, Disco turned on Konnan by hitting him with a Chart Buster and began feuding with both the Animals and the Thrillers.

==== The Boogie Knights ====
Disco reunited with both former rival and tag team partner, Alex Wright as The Boogie Knights, both becoming face. At Halloween Havoc, they challenged for the World Tag Team Championship in a triangle match but ended up losing the match. They were scheduled to win the World Tag Team Championship at Millennium Final on November 16, but Disco was legitimately injured. General Rection substituted for Disqo and then won the tag titles for Disqo and Wright. They dropped the title afterward. He ended up splitting from Wright and forming a brief partnership with Mike Sanders. Disco's last appearance with WCW came on the March 19, 2001 (second to last) edition of Nitro where he spoke about his new partnership with Sanders and lost a match to Jason Jett. WCW was purchased by World Wrestling Federation (WWF) later that week.

=== World Wrestling All-Stars (2001–2003) ===
After WCW's folding, he worked for World Wrestling All-Stars (WWA) as a commentator and wrestler (still using the Disco Inferno name). At Inception, he participated in a battle royal which was won by Buff Bagwell. It was a quarter-final match of the tournament for the vacant WWA World Heavyweight Championship. He was eliminated by the 'Fruits in Suits', Australian children's TV performers, in a WCW style joke story line. He later threw one of the Fruits off the top of a steel cage before the main event. Following the Inception pay-per-view he toured the UK with WWA, squaring off with Brian Christopher most nights on the tour, mostly ending in defeat. During these shows he introduced a new finishing move, the Village People's Elbow. A mockery of The Rock's People's Elbow the move saw Disco wear a hardhat while performing the YMCA dance before dropping the elbow. As well as wrestle, he would also join Jeremy Borash on commentary for the second half of these shows, and would claim to be there as the crowd had not shown him proper respect earlier in the evening.

In 2002 Disco continued with WWA, appearing at the Revolution pay-per-view in February. During this show he issued an open challenge for anyone to face him, as he had no opponent to face. He sat at ringside commentating in his usual style until he was beaten down by the returning Scott Steiner. The next PPV, Eruption, saw Disco commentating on the full event and not competing. He tried to intervene on a celebration dance off by Brian Christopher and Ernest Miller.

Later in the year he toured further with WWA in the UK in December. During this tour, which included the Retribution PPV, he mostly worked on commentary and ring announcing duties. He also credited as being the script writer/creative consultant for this tour. In 2003, he returned to WWA under his "Disco Inferno" gimmick. On May 23 in a house show in Australia, Disco faced WWA World Heavyweight Champion Sting for the title but lost the match. He returned to commentary duties for WWA final PPV, the Reckoning, broadcast from Auckland, New Zealand.

=== Total Nonstop Action Wrestling/Impact Wrestling (2002–2004, 2007–present) ===
==== Early years (2002–2004) ====
Gilbertti then went on to join Total Nonstop Action Wrestling (TNA), changing his alias to his real name. His name was often spelled incorrectly using "Glen Gilberti" or "Glenn Gilberti". On the July 31, 2002, weekly TNA pay-per-view, Disco Inferno debuted his weekly talk segment entitled Jive Talkin' after announcing that he would be hosting a talk show the previous week. The talk segment lasted three weeks ending on August 14, 2002, with the weekly guests being Goldy Locks, The Dupps, and "Dean Baldwin".

Gilbertti became a member of Sports Entertainment Xtreme (SEX) and even became their leader near the end of that angle. On May 7, 2003, pay-per-view, he won an Anarchy Battle Royal to become the number one contender to the NWA World Heavyweight Championship. The next month, he earned his title shot against the champion Jeff Jarrett but lost the match after Vince Russo hit him with a baseball bat.

After SEX disbanded, Gilbertti managed the tag team Simon Diamond and Johnny Swinger prior to forming the New York Connection (NYC) which consisted of Vito, Simon Diamond, David Young, Johnny Swinger and Trinity. On the November 26 pay-per-view, Gilbertti teamed up with Diamond and Swinger in a 6-man tag team match to face 3Live Kru (Konnan, Ron Killings and B.G. James) for the vacant NWA World Tag Team Championship. When their stable fell apart, Gilbertti began teaming with Young while Simon and Swinger formed a separate team. In late 2004, Gilbertti reunited with Swinger and the duo teamed up together at Turning Point in a losing effort to Pat Kenney (formerly Simon Diamond) and Johnny B. Badd. Gilbertti left TNA and returned to independent circuit.

==== Sporadic appearances (2007–present) ====
On October 18, 2007, edition of Impact!, Gilbertti appeared in a taped interview segment with Mike Tenay as Disco Inferno. He returned later in the show, losing in a squash match to Abyss.

In late 2007, Gilbertti worked for TNA as a road agent and also contributed to the creative team with Vince Russo. He also attended TNA's Lockdown fan interaction in Lowell, Massachusetts on April 12, 2008, and later appeared as a guest on the October 8, 2008 edition of Spin Cycle, TNA's online-exclusive show. On November 2, 2008, Gilbertti was released from his contract with TNA, with them citing budgetary cuts as the reason.

On the May 26, 2011 edition of Impact Wrestling, Disco Inferno made an appearance on Mr. Anderson's Scorpion Sitdown interview segment, where he was asked by Anderson to bury Sting. He refused and got beat down by Anderson until Sting came to his aid.

Disco Inferno made a brief appearance on the December 15 edition of Impact Wrestling titled "Total Nonstop Deletion." Appearing "backstage," Inferno commented on his relief in not having to face Matt Hardy's son King Maxel in his debut match after being pinned by him on another occasion.

Gilbertti appeared on the Thanksgiving 2018 episode of Impact Wrestling. Gilbertti had a plan to impress Scarlett Bordeaux. He participated in Eli Drake's 2nd annual "Gravy Train Turkey Trot", a 5-on-5 mixed tag team match where he teamed with Ohio Versus Everything member Jake Crist, Katarina, Desi Hit Squad member Rohit Raju, and their captain Eli Drake. They faced the team of Alisha Edwards, Dezmond Xavier, Kikutaro, KM (Kevin Matthews) and team captain Fallah Bahh. Gilbertti was pinned by Fallah Bahh after a Bonzai Drop. Since Gilbertti was pinned in the match, he was forced to wear the Turkey suit.

Gilbertti made his return on February 22, 2019, where he was shown backstage trying to find the management office. On the March 1 episode, Gilbertti showed up to start his new job with management role with Impact, while Tommy Dreamer told him to find the Anthem owl. On the March 8 episode, while searching for Don Callis ringside to discuss his Impact management role, Gilbertti had a confrontation with Scarlett Bordeaux. A match is booked between the two. On March 15, Gilbertti beat Kikutaro as he prepared for Bordeaux. On the March 22 episode, Gilbertti was shown at a bar "preparing" for his match with Bordeaux. On March 29, Scarlett Bordeaux beat Gilbertti in an intergender match. Later in the night, he was shown backstage being made fun of by Alisha Edwards and Kiera Hogan for losing to Bordeaux.

Gilbertti returned on the May 17 episode and spoke negatively about women's wrestling. While serving as a guest commentator for a women's battle royal, Gilbertti entered the match and won by eliminating Tessa Blanchard. On the May 24 episode, Gilbertti held an "exhibition" with Ashley Vox. He was confronted by Blanchard after badmouthing women's wrestling. On May 31, Blanchard beat Gilbertti in an inter-gender match.

Gilbertti returned on February 25, 2020, and formed a partnership with Johnny Swinger after Willie Mack said he would no longer be a tag team with Swinger. The following week, Gilbertti and Swinger lost to the Deaners. On the March 10 episode, Gilbertti and Swinger lost to Mack and Ace Austin. Gilbertti quit the team with Swinger after the match.

=== Independent appearances (2005–present) ===
In 2005, Gilbertti went back to working the independent circuit in Georgia and Minnesota. He also wrestled for the Southern Wrestling Alliance and Vince Russo's Ring of Glory.

Since 2009 he has worked as a trainer for Future Stars of Wrestling in Las Vegas and sometimes appears on the company's independent shows.

He appeared at the WrestleCon Supershow during Wrestlemania 31 weekend in San Jose, California. He defeated Mr. T.A.

Disco teamed with Eli Drake on March 11, 2018, at Future Stars of Wrestling in Las Vegas. The two lost to Raven and Tommy Dreamer.

== Podcasting ==
In 2014, Gilbertti began appearing as a guest on Major League Wrestling Radio's podcasts and in early 2015 briefly had his own podcast 'Hot News' alongside Mike Sanders on Vince Russo's now defunct Pyro and Ballyhoo website.

Gilbertti is currently one of the hosts of a podcast called Keepin it 100 with Konnan. He has been with the show since it debuted on Podcast One in 2016. He also does a podcast with Vince Russo called "Time Out".

== Personal life ==
Since 2009, Gilbertti started working as a host at the Sapphire Gentlemen's Club, a strip club in Las Vegas.

== Championships and accomplishments ==
- Great Championship Wrestling
  - GCW Heavyweight Championship (1 time)
  - GCW Tag Team Championship (1 time) – with Johnny Swinger
  - GCW Television Championship (3 times)
  - GCW United States Junior Heavyweight Championship (1 time)
- Impact Pro Wrestling (New Zealand)
  - Armageddon Cup (2008)
- Mid-Eastern Wrestling Federation
  - MEWF Heavyweight Championship (1 time)
- North Georgia Wrestling Association
  - NGWA Tag Championship (1 time) – with Ashley Clark
- Okanagan All Pro Wrestling
  - OAPW Championship (1 time)
- Palmetto Pride Championship Wrestling
  - PPCW Heavyweight Championship (1 time)
- Pro Wrestling Illustrated
  - Ranked No. 85 of the top 500 wrestlers in the PWI 500 in 1999
  - Ranked No. 374 of the top 500 singles wrestlers in the "PWI Years" in 2003
- Swiss Wrestling Federation
  - SWF Heavyweight Championship (1 time)
- Thrash Wrestling
  - Thrash Wrestling Championship (2 times)
- World Championship Wrestling
  - WCW Cruiserweight Championship (1 time)
  - WCW World Tag Team Championship (1 time) – with Alex Wright
  - WCW World Television Championship (2 times)
- Wrestling Observer Newsletter
  - Best Gimmick (1995)
