= Andrew McManus =

Australian concert promoter

- Born: August 1961 (age 65); Sydney, New South Wales
- Occupation: Music Promoter

Andrew McManus is an Australian live music promoter, and founder of several music promotion companies. In 1998 he established his first music promotion company, International Touring Company (ITC), in Brisbane. His companies promoted notable and high-profile tours of Australia by international acts include Fleetwood Mac, Mötley Crüe and Aerosmith.

McManus has also promoted comedians at the Melbourne International Comedy Festival with acts including Pauly Shore and Joan Rivers.

McManus is the former owner and promoter of the short lived World Wrestling All-Stars promotion, formed in October 2001 with its final tour in May 2003. The WWA toured Australia, Europe and New Zealand, airing their shows on USA pay-per-view. McManus appeared on air a few times to make some announcements, but mainly ran things from behind the scenes.

In 2009, McManus organised the Impact Fighting Championships tournament, featuring Ken Shamrock, Big John and others.

== Music career ==
McManus' career arguably started with his managing a band room in Coogee Bay Hotel in Sydney.

McManus was the manager of the Australian rock band Divinyls from 1987 to 1994.

McManus Entertainment was the promoter of reggae festival Raggamuffin since its launch in 2008. In 2014, McManus Entertainment partnered with Dawn Raid Entertainment to move Raggamuffin from Rotorua to Auckland.

In 2019, American rock band Live were to headline a music festival Under the Southern Stars run by McManus' enterprise, One World Entertainment. The festival was disrupted by the COVID-19 pandemic, and Live pulled out. Customers were only offered a rescheduled ticket to an entirely different concert set for March 2022. One World Entertainment denied refunds and told those who did not attend in 2022 that they must attend a concert in 2023 as compensation instead, resulting in dozens of ticket holders lodging complaints with consumer affairs. McManus had assumed nearly a quarter million dollars in debt, and blamed state governments and cited the Live Performance Code of Practice as reason to refuse refunds. NSW Fair Trading suggested this refusal to provide refunds and instead offer a "like for like" replacement breached the Australian Consumer Law.

In August 2022, One World Entertainment in partnership with TEG Live presented the Australian End of the Road World Tour by rock band Kiss to sold-out shows throughout the country. Founding Kiss member and bass player, Gene Simmons said of promoter Andrew McManus, 'He's family, and the best promoter in the world. We wouldn't be here without him.'

As of 2024, McManus is the promoter organizing the Pandemonium Rocks Festival, which is to be held across Sydney, Melbourne, the Gold Coast, and Brisbane in April. The Sydney show was originally scheduled to be held in The Domain on ANZAC Day but forced to relocate to Olympic Park due to NSW Govt being forced by the RSL Branch of NSW to block the Domain concert and forced the event our to Sydney Olympic Park. On 8 April 2024, Pandemonium Rock music festival announced on Facebook that 6 of the original 13 bands advertised as performing had pulled out, including major headliners Placebo and Deep Purple, with only partial refunds offered in the form of merchandise and drink credits. On 19 April, it was revealed that a massive data breach had occurred when the festival organisers asked patrons who were seeking refunds to fill out a form containing names, email addresses, phone numbers, and banking details. In an Instagram post, the festival acknowledged they caused the breach by leaving the admin settings on the form on, allowing normal users to see the results of the form.

=== ITC ===
On 11 May 1998, McManus registered his International Touring Company Pty Ltd (ITC) also known as the Ultimate Rock Symphony with the Australian Securities and Investments Commission (ASIC). McManus is purported to have sold this company to the public company Abigroup Limited in 2000. However, according to ASIC registers, no direct transfer of the business name took place at any time.

Instead, Abigroup Limited registered a new company under the temporary name of Mitchwil Pty. Limited on 22 August 2000. By 3 October 2001, McManus' company owed almost $270,000 to creditors, and a liquidator had been appointed. Mere weeks after the appointment of a liquidator on McManus' company, on 26 October 2000, Abigroup's Mitchwil Pty. Limited changed its name to the almost identical name of International Touring Company Pty Limited, while McManus changed his company's name to its more obfuscated ACN ("A.C.N. 082 577 526 PTY LTD"). Less than a month after that, on 16 November 2000, McManus became Director of Abigroup's new company of the almost identical name, which ran the entertainment at Sydney SuperDome.

McManus claims to have officially left this company in 2001 to start his company Andrew McManus Presents Pty Ltd (AMP). ASIC lists 9 November 2001 as a date of "Change to Alternate Director" for the new company. Abigroup's new company was voluntarily deregistered by September 2006. In response to the suggestion that McManus has engaged with phoenix activities, McManus' lawyer strenuously denied the allegations and stated that "at all times he has acted honourably in relation to his commercial dealings" "Mr McManus is a victim of the Australian tall poppy syndrome"

=== AMP International / Miz ===
On 4 July 2011, the day before liquidation proceedings began, Andrew McManus Presents (International) Pty Ltd, also known as AMP International, was renamed to Miz Pty Ltd. The company held only $15,251 in the bank, while it had debts exceeding $4.2 million. The company was promoting tours of Stevie Nicks, Mötley Crüe and Joan Collins, when the company was liquidated on 25 August 2011, McManus Entertainment, which was already lobbying for a Sydney New Year's Eve concert, soon took over these promotions.

== Legal issues ==
=== Fines for the Melbourne Storm breach ===
In 2010, McManus was involved in the Melbourne Storm salary cap breach by billing Melbourne Storm for "promotional" events through his company Andrew McManus Presents International to facilitate $800,000 in extra payments to players Greg Inglis, Cameron Smith and Billy Slater.

=== Conviction regarding the $702,000 cash found at Sydney's Hilton Hotel ===
On 11 August 2011, a black suitcase containing AUD $702,000 was seized by police from room 3026 at Sydney's 5-star Hilton Hotel. Former cage-fighter Sean Carolan claimed that he was minding the money for Owen "O-Dog" Hanson who allegedly didn't want to lose more money at Sydney's Star City Casino. Owen Hanson has been described as a Californian "cocaine kingpin", believed to have trafficked a tonne of cocaine onto Australia's streets. Incongruously, Hanson claimed that the money was given to Sean Carolan to invest in Carolan's weight loss clinic. The day that the cash was seized, the two were witnessed in a heated conversation with well-known American high roller "Robin Hood 702", Robert Cipriani, who phoned Hotel security and left later that day for Los Angeles. It is suggested the professional gambler was to launder the money through these casinos, but instead lost most of it on the tables.

During interviews with police on 4 April 2012, Andrew McManus lied that he was the Australian source of the money, that it was the profits from a Lenny Kravitz tour, to be used to repay Owen Hanson Jr a deposit for an Australian tour of the Texan rock trio ZZ Top. McManus was accompanied to the interview by his former business partner and then-practicing-solicitor Michael Anthony Croke. The purported business relationship between Andrew McManus and Owen Hanson was fictitious, Michael Croke and McManus had fabricated their story together via an email exchange, and produced fabricated evidence in support of these false claims. McManus has subsequently claimed that at the time of talking to police, he was under the influence of cocaine, alcohol, and prescription medication including morphine. McManus' purpose for his perverting the course of justice was to gain a $200,000 loan from the syndicate, hoping this would fund his next project.

In November 2014, police raided McManus' business in Richmond and his home in the Mornington Peninsula. On 10 September 2015, McManus was arrested at Melbourne Airport, charged with perverting the course of justice, two counts of intention to defraud by false or misleading statement, and knowingly participating in a criminal group, for his part in a money laundering scheme to cover the syndicate's importing of 300 kilograms of cocaine into Australia from Mexico.

In July 2016 at the New South Wales District Court, McManus plead guilty of attempting to pervert the course of justice. In March 2017, McManus was sentenced to a 20 months intensive corrections order, with Judge Williams finding that he was unlikely to re-offend and had shown remorse.
