= Jerry Tuite =

American professional wrestler (1966–2003)

Personal information
- Born: Michael Jerome Tuite; December 27, 1966 Newark, New Jersey, U.S.
- Died: December 6, 2003 (aged 36) Tokyo, Japan
- Cause of death: Myocardial infarction
- Spouse: Julia Scheel

Professional wrestling career
- Ring name(s): Big John; Gigantes; Hellraiser; Sgt. A.W.O.L./Sgt. A-Wall; Malice; Snuff; The Wall
- Billed height: 6 ft 8 in (203 cm)
- Billed weight: 320 lb (145 kg)
- Billed from: Ocean Grove, New Jersey
- Trained by: Mike Sharpe
- Debut: 1994

Michael Jerome Tuite (December 27, 1966 – December 6, 2003) was an American professional wrestler. He was best known for his appearances with World Championship Wrestling (WCW) from 1999 to 2001 under the ring names The Wall and Sgt. A.W.O.L., as well as his appearances with Total Nonstop Action Wrestling (TNA) in 2002 and 2003 as Malice.

== Early life ==
Michael Jerome Tuite was born in Newark, New Jersey on December 27, 1966, to Nancy and Jerome Tuite. He had a sister, Barbara Tuite-Hacht. He was a fan of professional wrestling growing up, citing the Powers of Pain, Road Warriors, Bruiser Brody and Buzz Sawyer as his favorite wrestlers. Tuite attended Christian Brothers Academy, where he played basketball. He later played basketball at Trenton State College and tried out for the Dallas Cowboys football team.

== Professional wrestling career ==
=== Early career (1994–1999) ===
Tuite made his debut in 1994 after training at Mike Sharpe's wrestling school in New Jersey, where he befriended Bam Bam Bigelow. He adopted the gimmick of a lumberjack under the ring name Big John. Early in his career, he wrestled at events held in high schools for charity. In 1996, he began wrestling as Hellraiser for New Jack City Wrestling (NJCW). On January 19, 1997, he defeated Primo Carnera III to win the vacant NJCW United States Championship, but lost it exactly four months later to Super Nova. For the next two years, Hellraiser wrestled for several promotions including Extreme Championship Wrestling (ECW) and NWA New Jersey.

=== World Championship Wrestling ===
==== The Wall (1999–2000) ====
In 1999, Tuite was discovered by World Championship Wrestling (WCW) booker Kevin Nash while training at the WCW Power Plant. He was repackaged as The Wall (a reference to the Berlin Wall) and debuted in April as the heel bodyguard for Berlyn. As The Wall, he utilized a chokeslam as his finishing move and regularly put his opponents through tables, earning him the nickname "Master of Table Matches." On November 21, at the Mayhem pay-per-view, he walked out on Berlyn during his chain match against Vampiro, causing him to lose and ending their alliance.

At Souled Out on January 16, 2000, The Wall appeared as the mystery opponent for Billy Kidman in a cage match, defeating him. He also defeated The Demon on February 20 at SuperBrawl. The Wall developed a sadistic streak and attacked younger wrestlers such as Crowbar and David Flair, which drew the ire of Bam Bam Bigelow. This led to a match between the two at Uncensored on March 19, which The Wall lost by disqualification after putting Bigelow through a table. Crowbar and Flair interfered in the match by attacking The Wall, but he chokeslammed Crowbar off a 20-foot-high platform, sending him through the stage.

In the main event of Nitro on March 27, The Wall faced Hulk Hogan, but the match ended in a no contest after interference from Vampiro. Following the match, he chokeslammed Hogan through a table. At Spring Stampede on April 6, The Wall faced Scott Steiner in a tournament for the vacant WCW United States Championship, but lost his quarterfinal match by disqualification after accidentally chokeslamming the referee through a table. He then feuded with and lost to Shane Douglas in a tables match on June 11 at The Great American Bash.

==== Misfits in Action (2000–2001) ====
Following the event, The Wall turned face by joining the military-based stable Misfits in Action, led by General Hugh G. Rection, Lieutenant Loco, Corporal Cajun, Major Stash and Major Gunns. He began sporting a mohawk and was renamed Sgt. A.W.O.L. (occasionally spelled "Sgt. A-Wall"). The group had various stable feuds with 3 Count, the Natural Born Thrillers and Team Canada. At Halloween Havoc on October 29, he unsuccessfully challenged Reno for the WCW Hardcore Championship. After the Misfits in Action split in January 2001, Sgt. A.W.O.L. reverted to back to his old character, The Wall. On February 18, at SuperBrawl Revenge, The Wall lost to former stablemate Hugh Morrus in his final appearance for WCW.

=== World Wrestling Federation (2001) ===
After WCW was bought out by Vince McMahon in March 2001, Tuite signed a developmental contract with the World Wrestling Federation (WWF). In August, he was given his release by WWF talent commissioner Jim Ross to deal with personal issues, including an addiction to painkillers.

=== Independent circuit (2001–2003) ===
Tuite continued to wrestle as The Wall on the independent circuit following his WWF departure. He returned to NWA New Jersey on July 12, 2001, defeating Simon Diamond in a tournament final to win the NWA New Jersey Hardcore Championship. He is recognized as the final champion. On April 2, 2002, he lost to D-Von Dudley in a dark match taped for WWF Jakked/Metal.

He made appearances for USA Pro Wrestling and Phoenix Championship Wrestling (PCW), where he defeated Harley Lewis on May 17, 2002, in a tables, ladders and doors match to win the PCW Heavyweight Championship. On June 15, The Wall took part in the inaugural show for Major League Wrestling (MLW), Genesis, as a replacement for Bam Bam Bigelow, where he lost to Taiyō Kea in the MLW World Heavyweight Championship tournament. On July 20, he appeared for Xtreme Pro Wrestling (XPW) under the name Snuff, defeating Vic Grimes. However, as Malice, he lost to Grimes in a rematch on October 5, which aired on television two weeks later. On November 2, The Wall defeated Devon Storm in an anything goes match to retain the PCW Heavyweight Championship.

On November 10, Malice took part in the All Access Wrestling (AAW) Heavyweight Championship tournament, defeating Norman Smiley, Kevin Northcutt and Joe Kane to win the title. Following this, he embarked on an international tour for World Wrestling All-Stars (WWA). At WWA Retribution on December 6, he teamed with Smiley in a loss to Buff Bagwell and Johnny Swinger. On December 13, he faced Lex Luger and Sting in a triple threat match for the WWA World Heavyweight Championship, but lost after being pinned by Sting. He was stripped of the PCW Heavyweight Championship on March 22, 2003. He then lost the AAW Heavyweight Championship to AJ Styles on April 19, after being hit with a low blow by referee Bob Armstrong.

=== Total Nonstop Action Wrestling (2002–2003) ===
On June 19, 2002, Tuite, under the name Malice, made his debut for Total Nonstop Action Wrestling (TNA) in a Gauntlet for the Gold match for the vacant NWA World Heavyweight Championship, lasting until the end before he was defeated by Ken Shamrock. He aligned himself with James Mitchell to form the Disciples of the New Church. On July 3, Malice unsuccessfully challenged Shamrock for the title. He faced Sabu in a ladder match on July 17 to determine the number one contender for the title, but lost. Malice subsequently feuded with TNA head of security Don Harris, who prevented him from chokeslamming Apolo after their match. He defeated Harris in a first blood match on August 7, before losing to him in a Last Man Standing match the following week. His last TNA appearance was on November 20, when he defeated Kory Williams.

He made a one-night return on March 19, 2003, to help Brian Lee and Slash during their match against Elix Skipper and Low Ki by preventing them from cheating. However, Slash and Lee were disqualified.

=== All Japan Pro Wrestling (2003) ===
Tuite made his debut for All Japan Pro Wrestling (AJPW) on February 8, 2003, as Gigantes, teaming with Arashi and The Gladiator to defeat Keiji Muto, Masanobu Fuchi and Jimmy Wang Yang. On February 16, Gigantes and John Tenta challenged Arashi and Nobutaka Araya for the All Asia Tag Team Championship, but lost the match by disqualification. The following month, Gigantes entered the Champion Carnival, defeating Yoji Anjo in the first round on March 22, but lost in the second round to eventual winner Satoshi Kojima on March 25. On June 8, Gigantes teamed with The Gladiator in a four-man tournament for the vacant World Tag Team Championship, but lost in the semifinals against eventual winners Arashi and Muto. On September 6, Gigantes and Taka Michinoku unsuccessfully challenged Arashi and Muto for the titles. From November to December, he teamed with Buchanan in the 2003 World's Strongest Tag Determination League, finishing in sixth place with six points. Tuite wrestled his final match on December 5, teaming with Buchanan and Justin Credible to defeat Araya, Kazushi Miyamoto and Tomoaki Honma.

== Other media ==
Tuite, as Sgt. A-Wall, appears as a playable character in the 2000 video game WCW Backstage Assault. He is also a playable character, as Gigantes, in the 2004 video game King of Colosseum II.

== Death ==
On December 6, 2003, Tuite, aged 36, was found unconscious in his hotel room by All Japan Pro Wrestling management and several wrestlers, including La Parka and NOSAWA. He was taken to a hospital, where he was pronounced dead on arrival. His cause of death was listed as an acute heart attack.

Four days after his death, TNA aired a memorial graphic for Tuite during their weekly pay-per-view. In January 2005, the National Wrestling Syndicate (NWS) held the "Jerry Tuite Memorial Show" in his memory.

== Championships and accomplishments ==
- All Access Wrestling
  - AAW Heavyweight Championship (1 time)
- NWA New Jersey
  - NWA New Jersey Hardcore Championship (1 time)
- New Jack City Wrestling
  - NJCW United States Championship (1 time)
- Phoenix Championship Wrestling
  - PCW Heavyweight Championship (1 time)
- Pro Wrestling Illustrated
  - PWI ranked him #126 of the 500 singles wrestlers in the PWI 500 in 2000

== See also ==
- List of premature professional wrestling deaths
