= Nathan Jones (wrestler) =

Australian professional wrestler, actor, and powerlifter (born 1970)

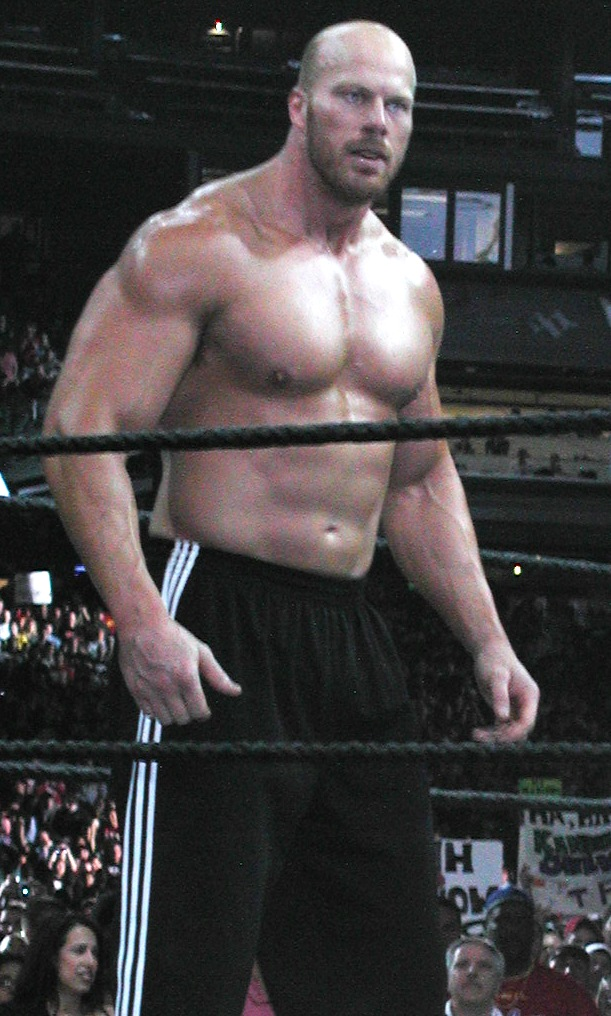
- Jones at WrestleMania XIX in 2003

Personal information
- Born: 21 August 1970 (age 56) Gold Coast, Queensland, Australia
- Spouse: Fawn Tran (m. 2016)
- Children: 1

Professional wrestling career
- Ring name(s): Nathan Jones; Nathaniel Stathom
- Billed height: 6 ft 11 in (211 cm)
- Billed weight: 345 lb (156 kg)
- Trained by: Ultimate Pro Wrestling; Mike Bell; Tom Howard
- Debut: 1998
- Retired: 2005
- Martial arts career
- Height: 6 ft 11 in (211 cm)
- Weight: 345 lb (156 kg; 24 st 9 lb)
- Style: MMA; Kickboxing, Muay thai

Other information
- Strongman career
- Weight: 207 kg (456 lb)
Medal record
Strongman
Representing Australia
World's Strongest Man
Qualified	1995 World's Strongest Man
Qualified	1996 World's Strongest Man
World Strongman Challenge
1st	1996
World Strength Championship
1st	1995
World Muscle Power Classic
5th	1995
Australia's Strongest Man
1st	1995
Callender Grand Prix
1st	1994

Nathan Jones (born 21 August 1970) is an Australian actor, strongman, powerlifter, and former professional wrestler. He is best known for his time in World Wrestling Entertainment (WWE) and World Wrestling All-Stars (WWA). A delinquent in his youth who served a prison sentence for armed robbery, Jones began his athletic career as a powerlifter and strongman, representing Australia in the World's Strongest Man competitions of 1995 and 1996. He made his acting career debut that same year in Police Story IV: First Strike (1996), opposite Jackie Chan. He began his wrestling career for Australian promotion WWA, followed by a stint in WWE, where he was billed as "The Colossus of Boggo Road" in reference to his criminal convictions.

Jones retired from wrestling in the late 2000s, and has since focused on acting. He portrayed supporting villain Rictus Erectus in Mad Max: Fury Road (2015) and its 2024 prequel Furiosa: A Mad Max Saga. He also appeared in films such as Troy (2004), Tom-Yum-Goong (2005), Fearless (2006), Conan the Barbarian (2011), Hobbs & Shaw (2019), and Mortal Kombat (2021), usually playing antagonists.

== Early life ==
Jones was born in Gold Coast, Queensland in 1970.

=== Legal issues ===
Before his career as a wrestler, Jones was sentenced to 16 years in 1987 at the age of 17 to Boggo Road Gaol for eight armed robberies between 1985 and 1987, two of which occurred in Tasmania. During the robberies, he became one of Australia's most wanted and ended up serving seven years in a maximum-security prison. In 1994, Jones was given one-year work release before being discharged at the age of 24. While in prison, he was introduced to the sport of powerlifting. He is also alleged to have begun taking steroids during this time. Within a short space of time, he became the National Powerlifting Champion of Australia.

== Strongman career ==
Upon his release, Jones also began competing in strongman contests, and during this time, he was dubbed "Megaman". As the reigning Australian Strongest Man, he entered the World Strength Championship at Callander, Scotland, on 29–30 July 1995. He took first place, topping a field that included 1993 World's Strongest Man Gary Taylor. The following weekend, he competed in the World Muscle Power Classic held at Mintlaw, Aberdeenshire, Scotland. That contest was won by Magnús Ver Magnússon, with Nathan finishing fifth in a field of twelve competitors.

Jones next took part in the 1995 World's Strongest Man contest. After quickly defeating Phil Martin twice in the arm wrestling event in the qualifying heat, Jones was then matched against Magnus Samuelsson, who had been Europe's arm wrestling champion for several years and who would become the World's Strongest Man in 1998. Samuelsson won the first round. In the second round, Jones refused to go down and pulled with his opposite arm, twisting his body. This resulted in breaking the arm he was using to wrestle (a spiral fracture of the humerus), and he subsequently was out of the competition. Jones returned to Strongman competition in 1996, winning the World Strongman Challenge, and placed third in a World's Strongest Man qualifying heat behind Magnús Ver Magnússon and Jorma Ojanaho. During the heat, Jones opted to retire from the penultimate event, confidently assuming he would win the last event to get the necessary points to get through to the final; however he placed fourth in the last event and angrily left the playing area, refusing to speak to any competitors or media.

== Mixed martial arts career ==
He also participated in a mixed martial arts match at Pride Fighting Championships's debut event Pride 1 in October 1997, facing Japanese professional wrestler and former grand sumo champion Koji Kitao. Jones was submitted after being caught in an armlock.

== Professional wrestling career ==
=== World Wrestling All-Stars (2001–2002) ===
After working as a bodyguard for multimillionaire Rene Rivkin, Jones began a career in wrestling during this time, working for Ultimate Pro Wrestling. Jones first gained fame working in World Wrestling All-Stars, making a large impression at the first WWA pay-per-view "Inception", where he was accompanied to the ring by Rove McManus. However, he was defeated after Rove was smashed with Jeff Jarrett's guitar and Jones was hit with the Stroke. During his time in the WWA, Nathan won the WWA World Heavyweight Championship on 7 April 2002 before losing the belt to Scott Steiner only 5 days later.

=== Pro Wrestling Zero1-Max (2002) ===
After the title loss, Jones began performing for Pro Wrestling Zero1-Max in June. On 20 October, Jones and Jon Heidenreich defeated Masato Tanaka and Shinjiro Otani to win the NWA Intercontinental Tag Team Championship. On 25 October, Jones and Heidenreich successfully retained the title against Jimmy Snuka Jr. For the 2nd time. and The Predator before losing the title the next day to Naoya Ogawa and Shinya Hashimoto.

=== World Wrestling Entertainment (2002–2003) ===
After Jones initially signed his contract with World Wrestling Entertainment (WWE), he was unable to work in the United States because of visa issues stemming from his criminal history. In late 2002 and early 2003, Jones began performing in dark matches for World Wrestling Entertainment. He was originally promoted as a "Hannibal Lecter" type character. On 10 April 2003 episode of SmackDown!, Jones made his televised WWE in-ring debut and defeated Bill DeMott.

Upon debuting, Jones' original character was mixed, and he was put into a storyline with The Undertaker as his protégé and helper during The Undertaker's feud with A-Train and Big Show. At WrestleMania XIX, Jones and The Undertaker were scheduled to face Big Show and A-Train in a tag team match, but at the last minute, the match was made a handicap match instead. On screen, Jones was attacked pre-match and left injured. Near the closing moments of the match, Jones reappeared and attacked Big Show, enabling The Undertaker to pin A-Train for the victory. Jones was then sent to Ohio Valley Wrestling (OVW) to improve his skills.

Jones was then absent from television for several months until returning in the fall of 2003 as a villain known by the nickname "The Colossus of Boggo Road", a title referring to his time spent in Boggo Road Gaol. He was paired with Paul Heyman on-screen, with Heyman taking on the role of SmackDown! General Manager. He was also immediately placed into Brock Lesnar's Survivor Series team, which also included A-Train, Big Show, and Matt Morgan to compete against Lesnar's rival Kurt Angle and his team. At Survivor Series, Jones was eliminated by Angle after he submitted to the ankle lock. Team Lesnar was defeated by Team Angle, and Jones was then relegated to interfere in Lesnar's matches along with the other members of Team Lesnar. He was also placed in matches by either Lesnar or Heyman to aid them. On 6 December 2003, Jones quit the company due to the rigor of WWE's heavy travel schedules while on tour in Perth, Australia.

=== Post-WWE and retirement ===
After leaving WWE, Jones was scheduled to make his pro wrestling return in 2004 at the Australian Wrestling Supershow III, booked against Mark Mercedes. Jones did not appear as advertised and a battle royal was held following an angry shoot promo on Jones by Mercedes and promoter Andy Raymond.

In 2005, he wrestled three matches for World Series Wrestling. On 5 October, he defeated Lee Star, and on 7 and 8 October, he defeated Mark Hilton. After his last match with Hilton, Jones immediately retired from wrestling.

In 2008, Jones signed with Total Nonstop Action Wrestling, but nerve damage caused by a cement truck hitting his left arm kept him sidelined for the first three months. He never wrestled for the promotion.

== Acting career ==
Following a segment on Good Morning Australia in which he lifted and pushed a Ute down a street, Jones was contacted by Jackie Chan to be in the film First Strike. Eight years later, Jones featured alongside Brad Pitt in the 2004 film Troy.

Although he had acted in movies as early as 1996, Jones pursued acting full time following his retirement from wrestling in 2005. In 2015, Jones had a featured role in the film Mad Max: Fury Road as Rictus Erectus. He portrayed the character of Reiko in the 2021 film adaptation of the video game Mortal Kombat. In 2016, he portrayed a negative role in a Bollywood film, A Flying Jatt. In 2024, Jones would reprise the role of Rictus Erectus in the prequel film Furiosa: A Mad Max Saga.

== Personal life ==
Jones has been married to his wife Fawn Tran since 2016; together, they have a son.

== Championships and accomplishments ==
- Pro Wrestling Illustrated
  - PWI ranked him #137 of the Top 500 singles wrestlers in the PWI 500 in 2003
- Pro Wrestling ZERO1-MAX
  - NWA Intercontinental Tag Team Championship (1 time) – with Jon Heidenreich
- World Wrestling All-Stars
  - WWA World Heavyweight Championship (1 time)
- Wrestling Observer Newsletter
  - Most Embarrassing Wrestler (2003)
  - Worst Wrestler (2003)

== Mixed martial arts record ==
Professional record breakdown
1 match	0 wins	1 loss
By knockout	0	0
By submission	0	1

Res.	Record	Opponent	Method	Event	Date	Round	Time	Location	Notes
Loss	0–1	Koji Kitao	Submission (keylock)	PRIDE 1	11 October 1997	1	2:14	Tokyo, Japan	

== Filmography ==
=== Film ===
Year	Title	Role	Notes
1996	First Strike	Hitman	
2004	Troy	Boagrius	
2005	Tom-Yum-Goong	T.K.	
2006	Fearless	Hercules O'Brien	
2007	The Condemned	Petr	
2008	Somtum (Muay Thai Giant)	Barney Emerald	
2008	Asterix at the Olympic Games	Humungus	
2011	Conan the Barbarian	Akhun	
2014	Charlie's Farm	Charlie Wilson	
2015	Mad Max: Fury Road	Rictus Erectus	
2015	Bhooloham	Steven George	
2016	Never Back Down: No Surrender	Caesar Braga	Direct-to-video
2016	A Flying Jatt	Raka	
2017	Boar	Bernie	
2018	In Like Flynn	The Mountain	
2018	The Scorpion King: Book of Souls	Enkidu	Direct-to-video
2019	Hobbs & Shaw	Russian Fighter Pilot	
2021	Mortal Kombat	Reiko	
2022	Spiderhead	Rogan	
2024	Rippy	Reuben Williams	
2024	Ricky Stanicky	Big Ben	
2024	Furiosa: A Mad Max Saga	Rictus Erectus	
2024	Martin	Jail fighter	
2027	Voltron †	TBA	Post-production

=== Television ===
Year	Title	Role	Notes
1997	Doom Runners	Vike	Television film

Preceded by Bill Lyndon	Australia's Strongest Man; 1995	Succeeded by Bill Lyndon
