= Crowbar (wrestler) =

American professional wrestler (born 1974)

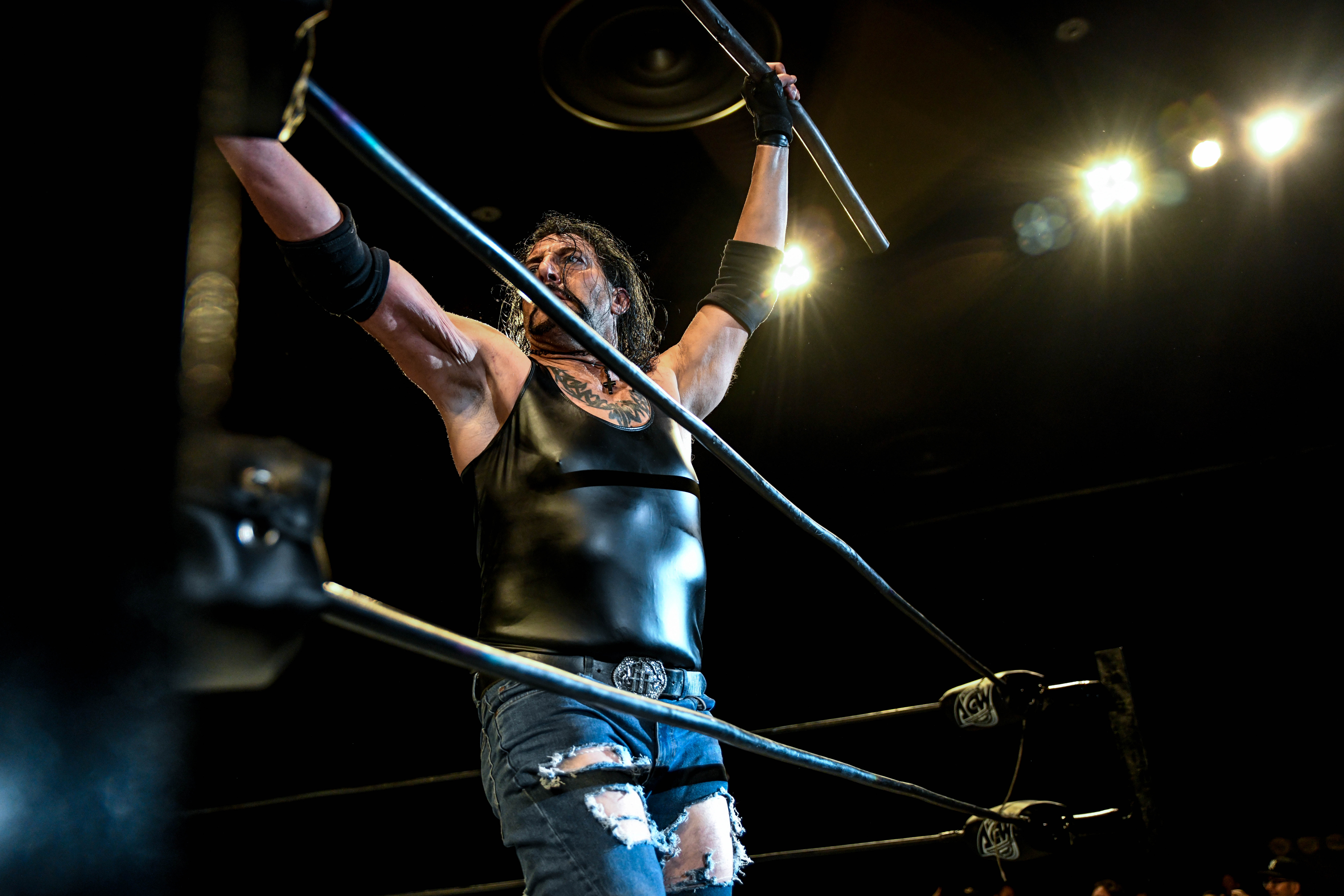
- Crowbar in May 2025

Personal information
- Born: Christopher Ford; March 4, 1974 (age 52) Rutherford, New Jersey, U.S.
- Education: Kean University

Professional wrestling career
- Ring name(s): Crowbar; Devon Storm; Judas; Salem; Storm; Tempest
- Billed height: 6 ft 1 in (1.85 m)
- Billed weight: 242 lb (110 kg)
- Billed from: Rutherford, New Jersey "The other side of sanity"
- Trained by: Mike Sharpe
- Debut: 1992

Christopher Ford (born March 4, 1974), better known by the ring name Crowbar, is an American professional wrestler performing on the independent circuit. He is best known for his tenure in World Championship Wrestling (WCW), where he was a one-time Hardcore Champion, a one-time World Tag Team Champion with David Flair, and a one-time Cruiserweight Champion, which he held jointly with Daffney. He and Christopher Daniels are the only wrestlers in history to have wrestled for World Wrestling Federation (WWF), World Championship Wrestling (WCW), Extreme Championship Wrestling (ECW), Total Nonstop Action Wrestling (TNA), Ring Of Honor (ROH), and All Elite Wrestling (AEW).

== Professional wrestling career ==
=== Early career (1992–1997) ===
While attending college, Ford began training under "Iron" Mike Sharpe. After completing his training, he began wrestling on the independent circuit under the ring name Devon Storm and formed a successful tag team known as The Extreme with Ace Darling. In November 1994, Storm took part in a tournament for the NWA World Heavyweight Championship, vacated by Shane Douglas; he lost to Tracy Smothers in the first round. After a few years on the indies, Storm wrestled in about 30 matches in Extreme Championship Wrestling in 1996, including losing to Taz via countout at Hostile City Showdown, 2 Cold Scorpio at November to Remember in a loser leaves town match, and Balls Mahoney at Holiday Hell. In 1996, he had four matches in WCW as Dangerous Devon Storm, including a match against Konnan for the United States Championship.

=== World Wrestling Federation (1997–1999) ===
In 1997, Ford, while using his Devon Storm name, took part in a tournament in the World Wrestling Federation to determine the first-ever Light Heavyweight Champion. He wrestled against and lost to Taka Michinoku, who later went on to win the tournament and the title. From 1998 to 1999, he would later appear on editions of Shotgun Saturday Night, losing to the likes of Droz and D'Lo Brown. He and Ace Darling briefly reunited as a tag team (but not using the name The Extreme) in a losing effort against the then newly formed team of Brian Christopher and Scott Taylor.

=== World Championship Wrestling (1999–2001) ===
After leaving the WWF, Storm signed a developmental deal with World Championship Wrestling. After signing with WCW he reformed The Extreme with Darling, but the team saw little success. Following the disbanding of The Extreme, he was placed in a faction with David Flair and Daffney, where he debuted under the name Crowbar. The gimmick of the faction saw all three members act mentally insane, with Daffney becoming known for screaming in her matches and Crowbar being prone to using high risk moves. On the January 3, 2000 edition of Monday Nitro, Crowbar won the World Tag Team Championship alongside Flair after winning a tournament against the teams of Lash LeRoux and Midnight, Buff Bagwell and Vampiro, and finally Kevin Nash and Scott Steiner. They later dropped the title to The Mamalukes (Big Vito and Johnny the Bull) on the January 19 edition of Thunder. After losing a rematch at SuperBrawl 2000, Crowbar teamed up with Daffney to defeat then Cruiserweight Champion Chris Candido and Tammy Lynn Sytch after Daffney pinned Sytch on the May 15 edition of Nitro, thus making them co-champions. Crowbar soon faced Daffney to determine the undisputed Cruiserweight Champion. Crowbar held back during the match, but still dominated the smaller Daffney. However, Candido entered the ring and hit Crowbar with a reverse piledriver and Daffney inadvertently pinned him while trying to revive him and thus became the second woman to hold the Cruiserweight Championship. Crowbar soon began feuding with former tag partner David Flair as well, in which both men traded wins on Thunder. Crowbar soon began chasing after the Hardcore Championship, which he won from Reno on the November 6 edition of Thunder. He later retained the title at Mayhem after defeating Reno and former rival Big Vito. During his reign as Hardcore Champion, he began a feud with Terry Funk that culminated at the final Starrcade pay-per-view, which saw Funk defeat Crowbar to claim his third and final Hardcore Championship.

Ford was later released from WCW in March 2001, right before the company was bought out by the World Wrestling Federation. During his time in WCW, Ford continued to work in the physical therapy field when he was not on the road and returned full-time to physical therapy after his release from WCW.

=== Return to World Wrestling Federation/Entertainment (2001, 2003) ===
After the closure of WCW, Ford, returning to his Devon Storm ring name, defeated fellow WCW alumnus Rick Fuller in a dark match on the April 10, 2001 edition of SmackDown!.

Ford later wrestled in several dark matches for World Wrestling Entertainment from mid to late 2003. Ford, alternating between his Devon Storm and Crowbar ring names, wrestled against the likes of Joey Matthews and former WCW alumni Scott Steiner and Sean O'Haire in dark matches before SmackDown! as well as on Sunday Night Heat and Velocity.

=== Independent circuit (2001–present) ===
He then spent some time in the now defunct World Wrestling All-Stars promotion, where he feuded with Sabu. During his tenure with the company, Storm became the WWA's first and only Hardcore Champion on October 24 when he defeated Danny Dominion in a tables match.

In early 2003, Ford wrestled briefly for Xtreme Pro Wrestling under the names Judas and Salem, losing his first match to former New Church ally Malice and winning the second against Vic Grimes.

On June 4, 2004, Ford began working for HealthSouth as a site coordinator and as an outpatient physical therapist. In addition to working in physical therapy, he returned to wrestling on the independent circuit under his Devon Storm and Crowbar ring names and began competing for various National Wrestling Alliance territories as well as other northeast independent promotions, such as the East Coast Wrestling Association, Jersey All Pro Wrestling, Bodyslam Wrestling Organization, and the Pro Wrestling Syndicate.

On October 6, 2012, Storm was defeated by Shawn Daivari in the House of Hardcore's first show.

Storm entered the Extreme Rising World Championship tournament which was eventually won by Stevie Richards. He defeated Sabu in the opening round but was defeated by Rhino in the semi-finals.

Crowbar, returning as The Timeless One, made his debut for Wrestling Open in Late 2022, Wrestling matches against the likes of Jhonny Santos, Alec Price and Ryan Clancy.

=== NWA Total Nonstop Action (2002–2003; 2013) ===
In 2002, Ford, under the new name Tempest, joined NWA Total Nonstop Action and became a part of Father James Mitchell's stable, The New Church. During his stint in TNA, Tempest took part in TNA's first and only Hard 10 Tournament, losing in the first round to The Sandman, who later went on to win the tournament. He returned in 2013 at the One Night Only show, Hardcore Justice 2 in a Hardcore Battle Royale that was won by Shark Boy.

=== All Elite Wrestling (2021) ===
Crowbar appeared with All Elite Wrestling on October 11, 2021, on an episode of AEW Dark: Elevation in Philadelphia, losing to Joey Janela. The match featured a cameo appearance by The Blue Meanie, with the two ECW alumni giving a "shoot" promo afterwards.

== Professional wrestling style and persona ==
Ford's style of wrestling is hardcore, that of his idol Terry Funk. He will occasionally jump from elevated locations and use weapons, most notably the crowbar. His finishing moves are the Sitout Front Suplex, which he calls the "Mindbender", and the inverted DDT, which he calls "The Eye of the Storm". Other moves he uses frequently are the Northern Lights Suplex, Catapult Splash, Catapult Leg Drop, La Quebrada, the Pescado, and the use of a crowbar as a signature weapon.

== Personal life ==
On August 7, 2004, Ford married ECW ring announcer Dina Caravella. They have two children who were born in 2007 and 2009.

Ford studied at Kean University for six years and graduated with a degree in physical therapy. Chris and Dina currently work at their own health care facility in northern New Jersey where Chris is a physical therapist and Dina is a registered dietitian.

== Championships and accomplishments ==
- American Championship Entertainment
  - ACE Fight or Flight Championship (1 time)
- Cauliflower Alley Club
  - Other honoree (1997)
- Battleground Championship Wrestling
  - BCW Championship (1 time, current)
- Century Wrestling Alliance
  - CWA Tag Team Championship (1 time) – with Ace Darling
- East Coast Pro Wrestling
  - ECPW Heavyweight Championship (1 time)
  - ECPW Tag Team Championship (2 times) – with Ace Darling(1) and Timothy Plazma (1)
  - ECPW Hall of Fame (Class of 2010)
- East Coast Wrestling Association
  - ECWA Tag Team Championship (1 time) – with Ace Darling
- Eternity Wrestling Association
  - EWA Tag Team Championship (1 time) – with Ace Darling
- Game Changer Wrestling
  - Indie Wrestling Hall of Fame (2026)
- Independent Superstars of Professional Wrestling
  - ISPW Heavyweight Championship (3 times)
- International Fighting Network
  - IFN Heavyweight Championship (1 time)
- Jersey Championship Wrestling
  - JCW World Championship (1 time)
- Jersey Shore Wrestling
  - JSW Heavyweight Championship (1 time)
  - Tidal Wave Rumble (2008)
- Mid-Eastern Wrestling Federation
  - MEWF Mid-Atlantic Championship (1 time)
  - MEWF Tag Team Championship (1 time) – with Mark Schrader
- NWA 2000
  - NWA 2000 Tag Team Championship (1 time) – with Ace Darling
- NWA New Jersey
  - NWA New Jersey Hardcore Championship (1 time)
  - NWA New Jersey State Heavyweight Championship (1 time, current)
  - NWA United States Tag Team Championship (New Jersey version) (1 time) – with Ace Darling
  - NWA World Light Heavyweight Championship (New Jersey version) (1 time)
- NWA New York
  - NWA New York Tag Team Championship (1 time) – with Ace Darling
  - NWA New York Television Championship (1 time)
- New Jack City Wrestling
  - NJCW Light Heavyweight Championship (1 time)
- RescueMania
  - RescueMania Championship (1 time, current)
- Richmond Championship Wrestling
  - RCW Tag Team Championship (1 time) – with Ace Darling
- Outlaw Wrestling
  - Outlaw Wrestling Championship (1 time)
- Pro Wrestling Illustrated
  - PWI ranked him #72 of the top 500 singles wrestlers in the PWI 500 in 2002
- World Championship Wrestling
  - WCW Cruiserweight Championship (1 time)^{1}
  - WCW Hardcore Championship (1 time)
  - WCW World Tag Team Championship (1 time) – with David Flair
  - WCW World Tag Team Championship Tournament (January 2000) - with David Flair
- World Wrestling All-Stars
  - WWA Hardcore Championship (1 time)

^{1}Crowbar held the title jointly with Daffney during his reign.
