= WWA World Heavyweight Championship =

Shortlived professional wrestling championship

- The WWA Championship belt (October 23, 2001 – May 25, 2003)

Details
- Promotion: World Wrestling All-Stars
- Date established: October 23, 2001
- Date retired: May 25, 2003
Statistics
- First champion: Road Dogg
- Final champion: Jeff Jarrett
- Most reigns: Jeff Jarrett (2 reigns)
- Longest reign: Scott Steiner (190 days)
- Shortest reign: Jeff Jarrett (<1 day)
- Oldest champion: Lex Luger (44 years, 188 days)
- Youngest champion: Nathan Jones (31 years, 220 days)
- Heaviest champion: Nathan Jones 350 lb (159 kg/25.0 st)
- Lightest champion: Jeff Jarrett 230 lb (100 kg/16 st)

The World Wrestling All-Stars (WWA) World Heavyweight Championship was a professional wrestling world heavyweight championship in World Wrestling All-Stars. It was the primary championship in the WWA. The title was sanctioned by WWA as their world championship and defended in multiple countries. It was unified with the NWA Worlds Heavyweight Championship on May 25, 2003.

== History ==
The WWA World Heavyweight Championship was unveiled in 2001 and first won by Road Dogg on October 23, 2001 by defeating Jeff Jarrett in Australia. Shortly after, however, the title was vacated for WWA's first pay-per-view, The Inception, on October 26, 2001. There, the title was contested in a tournament won by Jeff Jarrett. The title was contested in the WWA as its primary title until May 25, 2003, where the title was unified with the National Wrestling Alliance Worlds Heavyweight Championship in Auckland, New Zealand by Jeff Jarrett, the NWA Worlds Heavyweight Champion, who defeated Sting, the WWA World Heavyweight Champion.

== Title history ==
Key
No.	Overall reign number
Reign	Reign number for the specific champion
Days	Number of days held

No.	Champion	Championship change			Reign statistics		Notes	Ref.
No.	Champion	Date	Event	Location	Reign	Days	Notes	Ref.
1	Road Dogg	October 23, 2001	Live event	Perth, Australia	1	3	Defeated Jeff Jarrett to become the inaugural champion.	
—	Vacated	October 26, 2001	Inception	Sydney, Australia	—	—	Title vacated by Commissioner Bret Hart to be made available for the Seven Deadly Sins tournament.	
2	Jeff Jarrett	October 26, 2001	Inception	Sydney, Australia	1	163		
3	Nathan Jones	April 7, 2002	Live event	Sydney, Australia	1	6	This was a four-way match also involving Brian Christopher and Scott Steiner.	
4	Scott Steiner	April 13, 2002	Eruption	Melbourne, Australia	1	190	Sid Vicious was the special outside enforcer.	
—	Vacated	October 20, 2002	—	—	—	—	Steiner was stripped of the title after signing with World Wrestling Entertainment.	
5	Lex Luger	December 6, 2002	Retribution	Glasgow, Scotland	1	7	Defeated Sting to win the vacant title	
6	Sting	December 13, 2002	Live event	Zurich, Switzerland	1	163	This was a four-way match also involving Malice.	
7	Jeff Jarrett	May 25, 2003	Reckoning	Auckland, New Zealand	2	<1	This was a title unification match, where Jarrett also defended his NWA World Heavyweight Championship.	
—	Unified	May 25, 2003	Reckoning	Auckland, New Zealand	—	—	The WWA World Heavyweight Championship was unified into the NWA World Heavyweight Championship and retired as WWA closed after the event.	

== List of combined reigns ==
Rank	Wrestler	No. of reigns	Combined days
1	Scott Steiner	1	190
2	Jeff Jarrett	2	163
2	Sting	1	163
4	Lex Luger	1	7
4	Road Dogg	1	7
6	Nathan Jones	1	6
