= Bash at the Beach (1998) =

1998 World Championship Wrestling pay-per-view event

- Promotion: World Championship Wrestling
- Brand(s): WCW nWo
- Date: July 12, 1998
- City: San Diego, California
- Venue: Cox Arena
- Attendance: 10,095
- Buy rate: 580,000
- Tagline(s): Like Skinny Dippin' In The Shark Tank. Somebody's Goin' Down.

Pay-per-view chronology
| ← Previous; The Great American Bash | Next → Road Wild |

Bash at the Beach chronology
| ← Previous; 1997 | Next → 1999 |

The 1998 Bash at the Beach was the fifth Bash at the Beach professional wrestling pay-per-view (PPV) event produced by World Championship Wrestling (WCW). It took place on July 12, 1998, from Cox Arena in San Diego, California. The main event of the evening was the tag team match between Hollywood Hulk Hogan & Chicago Bulls star Dennis Rodman taking on Diamond Dallas Page & Utah Jazz star Karl Malone, less than a month after Rodman and Malone clashed in the 1998 NBA Finals. As a result of the participation of the two NBA stars, this event received significant mainstream attention, being covered by non-wrestling news organizations such as USA Today and CNN.

== Storylines ==
The event featured professional wrestling matches that involved different wrestlers from pre-existing scripted feuds and storylines. Professional wrestlers portray villains, heroes, or less distinguishable characters in the scripted events that build tension and culminate in a wrestling match or series of matches.

== Event ==
Other on-screen personnel
| Role: | Name: |
|---|---|
| Commentators | Tony Schiavone |
| Commentators | Bobby Heenan |
| Commentators | Mike Tenay |
| Interviewer | Gene Okerlund |
| Ring announcers | David Penzer |
| Ring announcers | Michael Buffer |
| Referees | Mark Curtis |
| Referees | Scott Dickinson |
| Referees | Mickie Jay |
| Referees | Nick Patrick |
| Referees | Charles Robinson |
| Referees | Billy Silverman |

Prior to the start of the pay-per-view, Villano IV and Villano V defeated Damien and Ciclope in a dark match.

The first match of the pay-per-view was a no disqualification match, billed as a Raven's rules match, between Raven and Saturn. Toward the end of the match, as Saturn went to jump off the ring onto Raven, who was on a table, Kanyon came out and pulled Raven out of the way. Kanyon then threw Raven back into the ring and attacked him with the Flatliner onto a chair. Riggs however attempted to interfere and attack Saturn, who hit Riggs with the Death Valley Driver. This enabled Raven to hit a DDT on Saturn and pick up the victory.

The second match saw Juventud Guerrera defeat Kidman, after he successfully avoided the Shooting Star Press, followed by hitting a 450 splash.

The next match was scheduled to be Stevie Ray against Chavo Guerrero Jr. However, prior to the match, Eddie Guerrero came out with a pair of scissors. As Ray and Chavo shook hands prior to their match, Chavo tapped out and stated he was ready for his Hair vs. Hair match against Eddie. When referee Charles Robinson saw Chavo with the scissors, he attempted to take them away, which Eddie used as the opportunity to roll up Chavo with an inside cradle, for the victory. After the match, Chavo attacked Eddie, chasing him to the back, and then proceeded to shave his own head.

The next match, which had not been previously advertised, saw Konnan take on Disco Inferno. During the match, Alex Wright attempted to interfere on Inferno's behalf, however Lex Luger attacked him and put Wright in the Torture Rack. As the referee attempted to break up Luger and Wright, and get them out of the ring, Kevin Nash used the opportunity to Jacknife powerbomb Inferno, and enabled Konnan to pick up the submission victory with the Tequila Sunrise.

The Giant next defeated Kevin Greene, after hitting Greene with a chokeslam.

Next was an unplanned match for the WCW Cruiserweight Championship. Champion Chris Jericho was told by J. J. Dillon that he would like him to defend his title against a local competitor. Jericho agreed under the condition it was a no disqualification match. Dillion then revealed the mystery opponent to be Rey Misterio Jr. Dean Malenko came to the ring during the match, which distracted Jericho as he attempted to put Mysterio in the Lion Tamer. Mysterio used this opportunity to roll up Jericho and pick up the victory.

The next match saw WCW World Television Champion Booker T defend his title against Bret Hart. Hart, however, was eventually disqualified after he used a chair on Booker T while they were fighting outside the ring. After the match, Hart continued to beat on Booker T and eventually applied a figure-4 leglock on him around the ring post. Stevie Ray came out to help Booker T and chased Hart from ring side.

The penultimate match was for the WCW World Heavyweight Championship. The challenger Curt Hennig hit the Hennig Plex on Goldberg, but Goldberg kicked out. Goldberg followed this up with a spear and a jackhammer to retain the title.

The final match of the night saw Hollywood Hogan and Dennis Rodman take on Diamond Dallas Page and Karl Malone. The match ended after The Disciple came out and hit the Apocalypse on Page, followed by The Disciple pulling Hogan onto Page and thus Hogan covering Page. Following the match, the event ended while other New World Order members came out to celebrate.

== Aftermath ==
The following night on Monday Nitro, the World Cruiserweight Championship was returned to Jericho, due to the interference from Dean Malenko during the match due to an infraction of the WCW rulebook stating that, if a suspended competitor interferes in a championship match, the title change is null & void.

== Reception ==
The event has received mixed reviews from critics.

In 2014, Kevin Pantoja of 411Mania gave the event a rating of 2.5 [Very Bad], stating, "Another WCW show where nearly every match is bad. The main event is abysmal and the World Title match is poor. The Cruiserweight Title match and the Hair vs. Hair match both disappoint while the only match that is worth a look is Kidman vs. Juventud. WCW continues to be the worst shows I review."

In 2018, Chris of Retro Pro Wrestling gave the event a rating of Recommendation: Avoid, stating, "And that, ladies and gentlemen, ends one of WCW's worst shows of 1998, if not of all time. Top and tailed by two truly appalling matches, everything in between that wasn't Eddie/Chavo or Kidman/Guerrera ranged from disappointing to dreadfully boring. Given how good WCW has been a year or two prior, it's sad to see the company in such a poor state. Recommendation: Avoid Bash at the Beach 1998 at all costs unless you're having trouble sleeping, in which case it makes for a good anaesthetic."

In 2021, Lance Augustine of TJRWrestling gave the event a rating of 6.75/10, stating, "This show was lacking from a quality match standpoint, with some solid matches, but a lot of misses. Goldberg winning the title the week prior was a huge moment for WCW, which a lot of people would argue should have been saved for this Pay-Per-View. I can see why they did it because of the main event we got, but giving away a title change on Nitro like that was a straight rating ploy. The Cruiserweight matches were very good and I thought Booker vs Hart was solid, although it could have been better. WCW as a whole had a complete stranglehold on the business at this time, but it isn't because of the main event programs they had been having throughout the year. I didn't hate this show, but there were some parts, especially the main event, that was tough to get through."

The PPV generated a buy rate of 1.50 which is equivalent to 580,000 total buys. The PPV was the second most bought PPV in WCW history behind 1997's Starrcade.

== Results ==
| No. | Results | Stipulations | Times |
|---|---|---|---|
| 1^{D} | Villano IV and Villano V defeated Damien and Ciclope | Tag team match | 07:51 |
| 2 | Raven (with Riggs and Lodi) defeated Saturn | Raven's Rules match | 10:40 |
| 3 | Juventud Guerrera defeated Kidman | Singles match | 09:55 |
| 4 | Stevie Ray defeated Chavo Guerrero Jr. | Singles match | 01:35 |
| 5 | Eddie Guerrero defeated Chavo Guerrero Jr. | Hair vs. Hair match | 11:54 |
| 6 | Konnan (with Lex Luger and Kevin Nash) defeated Disco Inferno (with Alex Wright) | Singles match | 02:16 |
| 7 | The Giant defeated Kevin Greene | Singles match | 06:58 |
| 8 | Rey Misterio Jr. defeated Chris Jericho (c) | No Disqualification match for the WCW Cruiserweight Championship | 06:00 |
| 9 | Booker T (c) defeated Bret Hart by disqualification | Singles match for the WCW World Television Championship | 08:28 |
| 10 | Goldberg (c) defeated Curt Hennig | Singles match for the WCW World Heavyweight Championship | 03:50 |
| 11 | Hollywood Hogan and Dennis Rodman (with The Disciple) defeated Diamond Dallas Page and Karl Malone | Tag team match | 23:47 |
(c) / – the champion(s) heading into the match; D / – this was a dark match
