= Bash at the Beach (1996) =

1996 World Championship Wrestling pay-per-view event

- VHS cover featuring Lex Luger and Macho Man Randy Savage
- Promotion: World Championship Wrestling
- Date: July 7, 1996
- City: Daytona Beach, Florida
- Venue: Ocean Center
- Attendance: 8,300
- Buy rate: 250,000
- Tagline(s): This is no Day at the Beach; Catch the Big One!

Pay-per-view chronology
← Previous; The Great American Bash	Next → Hog Wild

Bash at the Beach chronology
← Previous; 1995	Next → 1997

The 1996 Bash at the Beach was a professional wrestling pay-per-view event produced by World Championship Wrestling (WCW). It was the third annual Bash at the Beach and took place on July 7, 1996 from the Ocean Center in Daytona Beach, Florida. The event is best remembered for Hulk Hogan's heel turn and the formation of the New World Order (nWo), which contributed greatly to the success of WCW in the mid-to-late 1990s.

The main event was a six-man tag team match between The Outsiders (Kevin Nash and Scott Hall) and their mystery partner (revealed to be Hulk Hogan), and Macho Man Randy Savage, Sting and Lex Luger. Matches on the undercard included Ric Flair against Konnan for the WCW United States Heavyweight Championship, and Dean Malenko against Disco Inferno for the WCW Cruiserweight Championship.

== Storylines ==
The event featured wrestlers from feuds and storylines, portraying villains, heroes, or less distinguishable characters in matches designed to resolve their conflicts.

Scott Hall and Kevin Nash posed as invaders seeking to take over WCW.

The main storyline heading into the event involved The Outsiders (Scott Hall and Kevin Nash). On the May 27, 1996, episode of WCW Monday Nitro, Hall made his first WCW appearance — unnamed and unannounced — declaring his intention to invade the company and challenging Executive Vice President Eric Bischoff to select three of WCW’s best to face him and two partners to be named later. Nash debuted on the June 10 episode of Nitro, after which the two became known as The Outsiders.

At The Great American Bash, Bischoff accepted their challenge but refused to reveal WCW’s team, prompting Nash to deliver a powerbomb to him through a table. The next night on Nitro, a random drawing selected Randy Savage, Sting, and Lex Luger to face The Outsiders, who still refused to reveal their third man and continued disrupting WCW events.

== Preliminary matches ==
Other on-screen personnel
Role:	Name:
Commentators	Tony Schiavone
Commentators	Bobby Heenan
Commentators	Dusty Rhodes
Commentators	Mike Tenay
Interviewers	"Mean" Gene Okerlund
Interviewers	Lee Marshall
Ring announcers	Michael Buffer
Ring announcers	David Penzer
Referees	Randy Anderson
Referees	Randy Eller
Referees	Jimmy Jett
Referees	Nick Patrick

Before the event officially began, Jim Powers defeated Hugh Morrus in a dark match. In matches taped for WCW Main Event, The Steiner Brothers (Rick Steiner and Scott Steiner) defeated WCW World Tag Team Champions Harlem Heat (Booker T and Stevie Ray) by disqualification, Bobby Walker defeated Billy Kidman, The Rock 'n' Roll Express (Ricky Morton and Robert Gibson) defeated Fire and Ice (Scott Norton and Ice Train), and Eddie Guerrero defeated Lord Steven Regal.

The first match was between Psychosis and Rey Misterio, Jr. After starting back and forth with both applying and countering holds, Psychosis performed a spinning heel kick, followed by a suicide dive to the outside. Psychosis dominated after, performing a diving leg drop across Misterio's throat. As Psychosis ran at Misterio on the apron, Misterio performed a monkey flip, sending Psychosis' head into the ringpost. Misterio gained the advantage, performing a headscissors takedown on the outside. Psychosis came back after a drop toe-hold, performing a senton from the top rope to the outside. Psychosis then applied the hammerlock, which Misterio countered with a snapmare, and kept the advantage by performing several aerial moves. Psychosis countered a headscissors takedown attempt into a powerbomb, and attempted a Splash Mountain. Misterio countered the attempt into a hurricanrana from the top rope and pinned Psychosis for the victory.

The second match was a Carson City Silver Dollar match between John Tenta and Big Bubba, who was accompanied by Jimmy Hart. Attached to one of the ringposts by straps was a tall steel pole, with a sock of silver coins hanging from the top. At the start of the match, both attempted to get the sock but were stopped by the other. Bubba climbed the turnbuckles but Tenta forced him to drop onto the top turnbuckle. After performing an atomic drop onto the turnbuckle, Tenta tossed Bubba to the outside. Tenta attempted to remove the straps. Bubba came back and uses a belt to choke Tenta. He then used athletic tape to tape Tenta's left wrist to the middle rope and continued attacking Tenta with the belt. As Bubba cut Tenta's hair with scissors, Tenta performed a low blow. Using the scissors, he cut his hand free and attempted to cut the straps. Bubba stopped him, and performed a spinebuster. Bubba then told Hart to climb the pole. As Hart got the sock, Tenta performed a scoop slam. Tenta grabbed the sock from Hart, hit Bubba with it, and pinned Bubba for the victory.

The third match was a Taped Fist match between Diamond Dallas Page and Jim Duggan for Page's "Lord of the Ring" ring. At the start of the match, Duggan knocked Page out of the ring with a shoulder block. After hanging Duggan on the top rope, Page pulled Duggan's legs around the ringpost and taped them together. As the referee was releasing Duggan, Page cut the tape around Duggan's hands. Duggan then struck Page with punches to the outside, where Duggan dropped Page onto the guard rail and sent his back into the ringpost. Back in the ring, Page countered a suplex attempt into a bulldog. Page climbed the turnbuckles but Duggan hit the top rope, causing Page to fall onto the top turnbuckle. After knocking Page's head repeatedly on the top turnbuckle, Duggan performed a clothesline, sending Page to the outside. Duggan then sent Page back in the ring. As he climbed through the ropes, Page kicked the middle rope, which hit Duggan's groin. Page then performed a Diamond Cutter, and he pinned Duggan to win and retain his ring. After the match, Duggan taped his right fist and punched Page.

The fourth match was a Double Dog Collar match between The Nasty Boys (Brian Knobs and Jerry Sags) and Public Enemy (Rocco Rock and Johnny Grunge). Rock was connected to Sags, and Grunge was connected to Knobs. All four fought to the outside, and used several weapons on each other. Grunge performed a bulldog on Knobs on a steel chair. Rock performed a somersault legdrop on Sags and performed an axe handle to him through a table. All four eventually return to the ring, where The Public Enemy had the advantage. Rock went to the top turnbuckle, but Sags pulled the chain, and Rock fell onto the table. Knobs repeatedly attacked Grunge with the chain. Sags then hit an axe handle with the chain on Rock, who was on a table. Knobs hanged Grunge with the chain over the top rope as The Nasty Boys delivered a clothesline to Rock with the chain. Sags hit Rock with the chain, and pinned him for The Nasty Boys to win.

The fifth match was between Dean Malenko and Disco Inferno for the WCW Cruiserweight Championship. Malenko dominated early in the match. He performed a brainbuster and worked on Inferno's left leg using a leglock and the STF, but failed to defeat Inferno. Inferno fought back with punches, a flapjack onto the top rope, and a forward Russian legsweep. Malenko came back with a crucifix armbar. Inferno came back with elbow strikes and blocked an axe handle attempt into a neckbreaker. Malenko performed a springboard dropkick and attempted the Texas Cloverleaf, but Inferno reversed it into an inside cradle. Malenko finally performed a double underhook powerbomb and applied the Texas Cloverleaf to win by submission and retain his title.

The sixth match was between Steve McMichael and Joe Gomez. The match started with McMichael attacking Gomez in the corner. Gomez came back with punches and performed a crossbody. The match then went back and forth until McMichael used a mule kick to Gomez's groin. McMichael then targeted Gomez's back, performing a pendulum backbreaker and applying the camel clutch. Gomez then applied the sleeper hold, which Gomez countered with a sitout jawbreaker. McMichael performed a shoulder neckbreaker and attempted the Figure four leglock. Gomez countered it into an inside cradle and followed with several attacks to the head. As Gomez bounced off the ropes, McMichael caught him and performed a Tombstone Piledriver. McMichael pinned Gomez for the victory.

The seventh match was between Ric Flair, accompanied by Miss Elizabeth and Woman, and Konnan for the WCW United States Heavyweight Championship. The match started at a slow pace. Konnan had a slight advantage, applying a side headlock and, later, the surfboard. After a gorilla press slam, Konnan sent Flair to the outside with a clothesline. As Konnan was on the top turnbuckle, Woman shook the ropes, causing him to fall. Flair gained the advantage afterwards. After using an illegal eye poke, Flair distracted the referee, allowing Woman to perform a low blow on Konnan. Konnan came back with punches and backhand chops. Konnan countered a figure four leglock attempt into an inside cradle. Konnan then performed a drop toe-hold and applied the figure four leglock himself, but Flair got to the ropes. After a one-handed bulldog and a rolling thunder lariat, Konnan attempted a pin, but Elizabeth distracted the referee, and Woman hit Konnan with her shoe. Flair then pinned Konnan with both feet on the top rope for leverage to win the match and the title.

The eighth match was between The Giant and The Taskmaster, and Arn Anderson and Chris Benoit. The Giant and The Taskmaster attacked Anderson and Benoit during their entrance into the arena. McMichael hit The Giant with a briefcase and The Giant chased him backstage. This allowed Benoit and Anderson to double-team The Taskmaster. The match officially started as The Giant returned to the ring. Benoit and Anderson continued to attack The Taskmaster for the first half of the match and prevented The Giant from tagging in. The Giant finally tagged in after The Taskmaster delivered a belly to back suplex. As The Giant dominated Anderson in the ring, Benoit fought The Taskmaster outside. The Giant performed a chokeslam, pinned Anderson for the win, and returned backstage. After the match, Benoit continued to attack The Taskmaster. Woman came down but failed to stop Benoit. Benoit finally stopped when The Giant came back out.

== Hostile Takeover Match ==
The formation of the New World Order occurred at Bash at the Beach.

The main event, labeled "Hostile Takeover Match" by commentators, was The Outsiders (Kevin Nash and Scott Hall) and their mystery partner, against Randy Savage, Sting and Lex Luger. The Outsiders came down without their mystery partner, saying he was in the building, but they were capable by themselves. Luger and Hall started the match. As Nash held Luger onto the top turnbuckle, Sting hit a Stinger Splash on Nash, and Savage hit an axe handle on Hall. Luger, however, was unable to get out of the way and was knocked out cold. The match stopped to take Luger backstage. After the match resumed, Sting dominated Hall and tagged in Savage. Hall hit Savage coming off the top turnbuckle and Nash tagged in. Nash dominated Savage, then Sting. The Outsiders continued to beat down Sting. Sting came back with punches and finally tagged in Savage. Savage performed several diving axe handle smashes on Hall and Nash, but the rally was short lived as Hall distracted the referee long enough for Nash to hit a low blow on Savage.

Hulk Hogan then made his way to the ring as Nash and Hall retreated to the outside. In a surprise turn, the longtime fan favorite delivered two Atomic Legdrops to Savage, revealing himself as The Outsiders’ partner. The match ended in a no-contest after Hogan threw the referee out and hit Savage with a third Atomic Legdrop.

The stunned audience erupted in boos and began pelting the ring with trash. One fan attempted to attack Hogan but was subdued by Hall and Nash before being escorted out by security. Amid the chaos, "Mean" Gene Okerlund entered the ring to interview Hogan, who proclaimed that he, Hall, and Nash were "the new world order of wrestling," thus naming the group – the New World Order.

Gene Okerlund: Hulk Hogan, excuse me! Excuse me. What in the world are you thinking?
Hulk Hogan: Mean Gene, the first thing you need to do is to tell these people to shut up if you wanna hear what I gotta say!
Okerlund: I have been with you for so many years, for you to join up with the likes of these two men absolutely makes me sick to my stomach! And I think that these people here (points to the crowd) and a lot of other people around the world have had just about enough of this man (pointing at Nash), this man (pointing at Hall), and you want to put yourself in this group? You've gotta be kidding me!
Hogan: Well, the first thing you gotta realize, brother, is this right here is the future of wrestling! You can call this (pointing at Hall, Nash and himself) the new world order of wrestling, brother!

Hogan continued, reminding everybody of the "great big organization up north" where Hall and Nash had come from and that he too had been there and how he had made that company a household name. Hogan followed by bringing up his signing with WCW in 1994.

Hogan: And then Billionaire Ted, amigo, he wanted to talk turkey with Hulk Hogan. Well, Billionaire Ted promised me movies, brother. Billionaire Ted promised me millions of dollars. And Billionaire Ted promised me world-caliber matches. And as far as Billionaire Ted goes, Eric Bischoff, and the whole WCW goes, I'm bored, brother!

He then declared that Hall and Nash were the kind of people he really wanted as his friends and that together, the three of them were going to take over WCW and destroy everything in their path. At this point, Okerlund directed Hogan to look at the debris strewn around the ring and told him that he could expect more of this if he chose to associate with Hall and Nash (subtly suggesting that Hogan should reconsider one more time). Hogan disregarded Okerlund and went into a tirade against the fans while taking another shot at Bischoff and some of the newer talent the fans were cheering.

Okerlund (pointing at the debris on the mat): Look at all of this crap in this ring! This is what's in the future for you, if you wanna hang around the likes of this man Hall and this man Nash.
Hogan: As far as I'm concerned, all this crap in the ring represents these fans out here! For two years, brother! For two years, I held my head high! I did everything for the charities! I did everything for the kids! And the reception I got when I came out here, you fans can stick it, brother! Because, if it wasn't for Hulk Hogan, you people wouldn't be here! If it wasn't for Hulk Hogan, Eric Bischoff would be still selling meat from a truck in Minneapolis! And, if it wasn't for Hulk Hogan, all these johnny-come-latelies that you see out here wrestling wouldn't be here! I was selling out the world, brother, while they were pumping gas to put in their car to get to high school! So the way it is now, brother, with Hulk Hogan, and the new world organization of wrestling, brother, me and the new blood by my side... whatcha gonna do, brother, when the new world organization [sic]runs wild on you?

Hogan then grabbed Okerlund by the collar moments later but quickly let him go after Okerlund threatened to sue him if he didn't. The show closed with the three wrestlers continuing to taunt the fans, who booed and pelted them with garbage. Wrapping up the event on pay-per-view, a still-stunned Tony Schiavone said: "Hulk Hogan, you can go to hell... straight to hell".

== Reception and aftermath ==
Following the event, Scott Hall, Kevin Nash, and Hulk Hogan—now calling himself Hollywood Hogan—formed the New World Order (nWo) and continued their campaign to take over WCW. On the July 15, 1996, episode of WCW Monday Nitro, the group attacked Lex Luger and Big Bubba after their match. Two weeks later, on July 29, The Outsiders assaulted Arn Anderson, the American Males (Marcus Bagwell and Scotty Riggs), and Rey Misterio, Jr., with Nash throwing Misterio into a dressing room trailer before the group fled in a limousine.

At Hog Wild, the following pay-per-view, Hogan defeated The Giant to win the WCW World Heavyweight Championship. Afterwards, the nWo spray-painted “NWO” on the belt, declaring it the faction’s official championship.

The nWo became a defining element of WCW and professional wrestling at large, ushering in a shift toward more realistic, adult-oriented storylines. While the original incarnation ended in 1998, the nWo persisted in WCW until 2000 through multiple versions. The angle was central to WCW’s dominance over the World Wrestling Federation (WWF), with Nitro surpassing Monday Night Raw in television ratings for 83 consecutive weeks.

During the original pay-per-view broadcast, Bobby "The Brain" Heenan famously asked “Whose side is he on?!” as Hogan approached the ring. This line was removed from the Hulk Hogan anthology DVD but has been retained in later versions, including on WWE Classics On Demand and the WWE Network.

== Results ==
No.	Results	Stipulations	Times
1^{D}	Jim Powers defeated Hugh Morrus	Singles match	04:23
2^{ME}	The Steiner Brothers (Rick and Scott) defeated Harlem Heat (Booker T and Stevie Ray) (c) (with Sister Sherri and Col. Robert Parker) by disqualification	Tag team match for the WCW World Tag Team Championship	05:01
3^{ME}	Bobby Walker defeated Billy Kidman	Singles match	02:00
4^{ME}	The Rock 'n' Roll Express (Ricky Morton and Robert Gibson) defeated Fire and Ice (Scott Norton and Ice Train)	Tag team match	02:08
5^{ME}	Eddie Guerrero defeated Lord Steven Regal	Singles match	03:38
6	Rey Misterio Jr. defeated Psychosis	Singles match	15:18
7	John Tenta defeated Big Bubba (with Jimmy Hart)	Carson City Silver Dollar match	08:53
8	Diamond Dallas Page defeated Jim Duggan	Taped Fist match	05:39
9	The Nasty Boys (Brian Knobbs and Jerry Sags) defeated Public Enemy (Rocco Rock and Johnny Grunge)	Double Dog Collar match	11:25
10	Dean Malenko (c) defeated Disco Inferno by submission	Singles match for the WCW Cruiserweight Championship	12:04
11	Steve McMichael (with Queen Debra) defeated Joe Gomez	Singles match	06:44
12	Ric Flair (with Miss Elizabeth and Woman) defeated Konnan (c)	Singles match for the WCW United States Heavyweight Championship	15:39
13	The Giant and The Taskmaster defeated Arn Anderson and Chris Benoit	Tag team match	07:59
14	The Outsiders (Kevin Nash and Scott Hall) and Hulk Hogan vs. Randy Savage, Sting and Lex Luger ended in a no contest	Six-man tag team match	16:55
(c) / – the champion(s) heading into the match; D / – this was a dark match; ME / – the match was broadcast prior to the pay-per-view on Main Event
