= List of WCW World Heavyweight Champions =

Listing of professional wrestling champions for the WCW World Heavyweight Championship

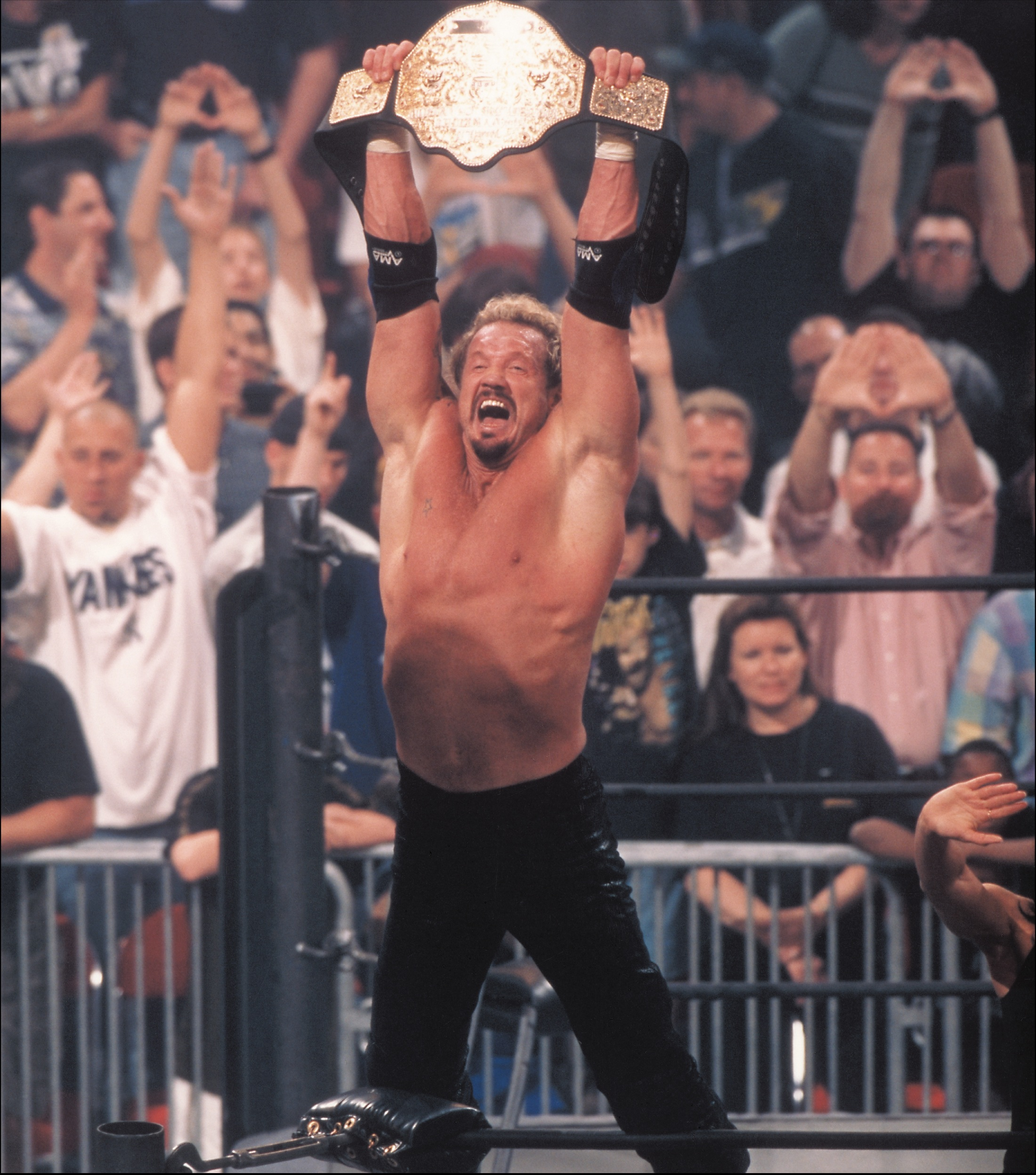
Three-time champion Diamond Dallas Page holding the "Big Gold Belt" (upside down), which represented the WCW World Heavyweight Championship in 1991 and 1994–2001

The list of WCW World Heavyweight Champions is a chronological list of wrestlers that have held the WCW World Heavyweight Championship by ring name.

The WCW World Heavyweight Championship was a professional wrestling world heavyweight championship and its lineage began when Ted Turner purchased Jim Crockett Promotions (JCP), which used the National Wrestling Alliance (NWA) alliance name. Turner's organization was renamed World Championship Wrestling (WCW) and split from the NWA in 1991.

The WCW World Heavyweight Championship is the original world title of WCW and it remained as such until March 2001, when WCW was purchased by the World Wrestling Federation (WWF, now known as WWE) and the championship was defended as the WCW Championship as part of the Invasion storyline, with the WCW initials being dropped from the title's name in November 2001. In December 2001, the renamed World Championship was unified with the WWF Championship to create the Undisputed WWF Championship.

The championship was generally contested in professional wrestling matches, in which participants execute scripted finishes rather than contend in direct competition. There have been a total of 22 recognized champions who have had a combined 62 official reigns, with Ric Flair holding the most at eight (but WWE does not recognize the title being vacated after the 1994 Spring Stampede match, although WCW did recognize this). At 51, Flair was also the oldest champion when he won it in May 2000, while The Giant was the youngest when he won it in October 1995 at 23. The longest reigning champion was Hulk Hogan, who held the title for 469 days, which is the only reign to exceed one year. The shortest reigning champion was Chris Jericho, who held the title for approximately 13 1/2 minutes, since he unified the title with the WWF Championship at Vengeance.

== Title history ==
=== Names ===
| Name | Years |
|---|---|
| WCW World Heavyweight Championship | January 11, 1991 – March 26, 2001 |
| WCW Championship | June 24, 2001 – November 18, 2001 |
| World Championship | November 19, 2001 – December 9, 2001 |

=== Reigns ===
Key
| No. | Overall reign number |
| Reign | Reign number for the specific champion |
| Days | Number of days held |

| No. | Champion | Championship change | | | Reign statistics | | Notes | Ref. |
| No. | Champion | Date | Event | Location | Reign | Days | Notes | Ref. |
|---|---|---|---|---|---|---|---|---|
National Wrestling Alliance (NWA): World Championship Wrestling (WCW)
| 1 | Ric Flair | January 11, 1991 | House show | East Rutherford, New Jersey | 1 | 171 | Defeated Sting for the NWA World Heavyweight Championship. WCW began recognizing Flair as WCW World Heavyweight Champion. WWE recognizes this reign as an NWA world title reign for Flair's 16 world championships and not a WCW one. | |
| — | Vacated | July 1, 1991 | — | — | — | — | Ric Flair was stripped of the title when his contract was terminated by WCW Executive Vice President Jim Herd following a contract dispute, and Flair subsequently signed with the World Wrestling Federation (WWF). News of Flair's departure and the vacancy of the WCW World Heavyweight title were announced on the July 6, 1991 edition of WCW Saturday Night. | |
| 2 | Lex Luger | July 14, 1991 | The Great American Bash | Baltimore, Maryland | 1 | 230 | Luger was originally the number one contender to face Ric Flair, but following Flair's WCW departure, Luger defeated Barry Windham in a steel cage match to win the vacant title. | |
| 3 | Sting | February 29, 1992 | SuperBrawl II | Milwaukee, Wisconsin | 1 | 134 | | |
| 4 | Big Van Vader | July 12, 1992 | The Great American Bash | Albany, Georgia | 1 | 21 | | |
| 5 | Ron Simmons | August 2, 1992 | Main Event | Baltimore, Maryland | 1 | 150 | Due to injury, Sting was unable to have a rematch with Vader, so a raffle was done to take Sting's place as the number one contender. Ron Simmons won the raffle and with this win, WWE recognizes him as the first African-American to win a professional wrestling world championship. Aired on tape delay on August 16, 1992. | |
| 6 | Big Van Vader | December 30, 1992 | House show | Baltimore, Maryland | 2 | 71 | | |
| 7 | Sting | March 11, 1993 | House show | London, England | 2 | 6 | | |
| 8 | Big Van Vader | March 17, 1993 | House show | Dublin, Ireland | 3 | 285 | During this reign in September 1993, WCW conclusively left the NWA and created a subsidiary called WCW International. Ric Flair, who had returned to WCW and won the NWA World Heavyweight Championship, was recognized as the inaugural WCW International World Heavyweight Champion. | |
World Championship Wrestling (WCW)
| 9 | Ric Flair | December 27, 1993 | Starrcade: 10th Anniversary | Charlotte, North Carolina | 2 | 111 | This was a title vs. career match. | |
| — | Vacated | April 17, 1994 | Spring Stampede | Chicago, Illinois | — | — | A title match between Ric Flair and Ricky Steamboat ended in a double pin, which resulted in the title being vacated. This vacancy was recognized by WCW, but is not recognized by WWE. | |
| 10 | Ric Flair | April 21, 1994 | Saturday Night | Atlanta, Georgia | 3 | 87 | Flair defeated Ricky Steamboat in a rematch for the vacant title. Aired on tape delay on May 14, 1994. During this reign on June 23, 1994, Flair unified the title with the WCW International World Heavyweight Championship. | |
| 11 | Hulk Hogan | July 17, 1994 | Bash at the Beach | Orlando, Florida | 1 | 469 | | |
| 12 | The Giant | October 29, 1995 | Halloween Havoc | Detroit, Michigan | 1 | 8 | This was a match in which the title could change hands via disqualification due to a contract clause. The Giant was declared winner by disqualification after Hulk Hogan's manager, Jimmy Hart, interfered, followed by attacks on Hogan from members of The Dungeon of Doom. | |
| — | Vacated | November 6, 1995 | Nitro | Jacksonville, Florida | — | — | The Giant was stripped of the title due to the controversial finish of the Halloween Havoc match. | |
| 13 | Randy Savage | November 26, 1995 | World War 3 | Norfolk, Virginia | 1 | 31 | This was the first-ever World War 3 match. Savage last eliminated One Man Gang to win the vacant title. | |
| 14 | Ric Flair | December 27, 1995 | Starrcade: World Cup of Wrestling | Nashville, Tennessee | 4 | 26 | | |
| 15 | Randy Savage | January 22, 1996 | Nitro | Las Vegas, Nevada | 2 | 20 | | |
| 16 | Ric Flair | February 11, 1996 | SuperBrawl VI | St. Petersburg, Florida | 5 | 71 | This was a steel cage match. | |
| 17 | The Giant | April 22, 1996 | Nitro | Albany, Georgia | 2 | 110 | Aired on tape delay on April 29, 1996. | |
| 18 | "Hollywood" Hulk Hogan | August 10, 1996 | Hog Wild | Sturgis, South Dakota | 2 | 359 | First held title as Hulk Hogan. It was often announced as the nWo/WCW World Heavyweight Championship during title defenses, though never officially renamed, while nWo members only referred to it as the nWo World Heavyweight Championship. | |
| 19 | Lex Luger | August 4, 1997 | Nitro | Auburn Hills, Michigan | 2 | 5 | | |
| 20 | Hollywood Hogan | August 9, 1997 | Road Wild | Sturgis, South Dakota | 3 | 141 | | |
| 21 | Sting | December 28, 1997 | Starrcade | Washington, D.C. | 3 | 11 | Hogan first pinned Sting, but guest referee Bret Hart accused the first referee, Nick Patrick, of making a fast count and restarted the match. Sting then won by submission. | |
| — | Vacated | January 8, 1998 | Thunder | Daytona Beach, Florida | — | — | Sting was stripped of the title due to the controversy over the finishes of the Starrcade match and the rematch which took place the following night. | |
| 22 | Sting | February 22, 1998 | SuperBrawl VIII | Daly City, California | 4 | 56 | Defeated Hollywood Hogan in a rematch for the vacant title. | |
| 23 | Randy Savage | April 19, 1998 | Spring Stampede | Denver, Colorado | 3 | 1 | This was a no disqualification match. | |
| 24 | Hollywood Hogan | April 20, 1998 | Nitro | Colorado Springs, Colorado | 4 | 77 | This was a no disqualification match. | |
| 25 | Goldberg | July 6, 1998 | Nitro | Atlanta, Georgia | 1 | 174 | | |
| 26 | Kevin Nash | December 27, 1998 | Starrcade | Washington, D.C. | 1 | 8 | This was a no disqualification match. | |
| 27 | Hollywood Hogan | January 4, 1999 | Nitro | Atlanta, Georgia | 5 | 69 | Nash laid down for Hogan in a match that would later be known as the "Fingerpoke of Doom". | |
| 28 | Ric Flair | March 14, 1999 | Uncensored | Louisville, Kentucky | 6 | 28 | This was a First Blood barbed wire steel cage match. | |
| 29 | Diamond Dallas Page | April 11, 1999 | Spring Stampede | Tacoma, Washington | 1 | 15 | This was a four corners match, also involving Sting and Hollywood Hulk Hogan. Randy Savage was the special guest referee. | |
| 30 | Sting | April 26, 1999 | Nitro | Fargo, North Dakota | 5 | <1 | WWE.com mistakenly lists Sting's reign as lasting from April 26, 1999 to April 29, 1999, despite this and the following match's descriptions stating that this reign began and ended on the same night. | |
| 31 | Diamond Dallas Page | April 26, 1999 | Nitro | Fargo, North Dakota | 2 | 13 | This was a four corners match, also involving Goldberg and Kevin Nash who Page pinned. WWE recognizes DDP's reign as lasting 14 days. | |
| 32 | Kevin Nash | May 9, 1999 | Slamboree | St. Louis, Missouri | 2 | 63 | | |
| 33 | Randy Savage | July 11, 1999 | Bash at the Beach | Fort Lauderdale, Florida | 4 | 1 | This was a tag team match pitting Savage and Sid Vicious against Kevin Nash and Sting. Savage pinned Nash to win the title. | |
| 34 | Hollywood Hogan | July 12, 1999 | Nitro | Jacksonville, Florida | 6 | 62 | | |
| 35 | Sting | September 12, 1999 | Fall Brawl | Winston-Salem, North Carolina | 6 | 43 | | |
| — | Vacated | October 25, 1999 | Nitro | Phoenix, Arizona | — | — | Sting was stripped of the title after losing an unsanctioned match against Goldberg and attacking referee Charles Robinson at Halloween Havoc. | |
| 36 | Bret Hart | November 21, 1999 | Mayhem | Toronto, Ontario | 1 | 29 | Defeated Chris Benoit in a tournament final for the vacant title. | |
| — | Vacated | December 20, 1999 | Nitro | Baltimore, Maryland | — | — | Bret Hart vacated the title due to the controversial end to a match with Goldberg at Starrcade. | |
| 37 | Bret Hart | December 20, 1999 | Nitro | Baltimore, Maryland | 2 | 27 | Defeated Goldberg in a rematch for the vacant title. | |
| — | Vacated | January 16, 2000 | Souled Out | Cincinnati, Ohio | — | — | Bret Hart vacated the title due to a legitimate injury. | |
| 38 | Chris Benoit | January 16, 2000 | Souled Out | Cincinnati, Ohio | 1 | 1 | Defeated Sid Vicious for the vacant title. The following day, after a dispute with management, he left WCW for the WWF. The company withdrew recognition of Benoit's reign, which was not listed in the title lineage at WCW.com. However, WWE (who assumed the title upon purchasing WCW in March 2001) recognizes Benoit's reign at WWE.com. | |
| — | Vacated | January 17, 2000 | Nitro | Columbus, Ohio | — | — | In storyline, Chris Benoit was stripped of the title because he won the match although Sid Vicious' foot was under the rope during the submission. In reality, Benoit forfeited the title and left for the WWF after dispute with management. | |
| 39 | Sid Vicious | January 24, 2000 | Nitro | Los Angeles, California | 1 | 1 | Defeated The Harris Brothers for the right to face Kevin Nash. Sid then defeated Nash for the vacant title. WWE recognizes Sid's reign as lasting 2 days, ending on January 26, 2000, when the following episode aired on tape delay. | |
| — | Vacated | January 26, 2000 | Thunder | Las Vegas, Nevada | — | — | Sid Vicious was stripped of the title by Commissioner Kevin Nash, as Sid did not pin the legal man to win the championship. Aired on tape delay on January 26, 2000. | |
| † | Kevin Nash | January 26, 2000 | Thunder | Las Vegas, Nevada | 3 | 0 | As Commissioner, Nash awarded himself the vacant title; this reign was not recognised by WCW, and is not recognised by WWE. Aired on tape delay on January 26, 2000. | |
| 40 | Sid Vicious | January 26, 2000 | Thunder | Las Vegas, Nevada | 2 | 76 | This was a triangle steel cage match, also involving Kevin Nash and Ron Harris. Sid made Nash submit to win the title. WWE recognizes Sid's reign as lasting 75 days, beginning on January 26, 2000, when the episode aired on tape delay. | |
| — | Vacated | April 10, 2000 | Nitro | Denver, Colorado | — | — | All WCW titles were declared vacant by Vince Russo and Eric Bischoff after WCW was rebooted. | |
| 41 | Jeff Jarrett | April 16, 2000 | Spring Stampede | Chicago, Illinois | 1 | 8 | Defeated Diamond Dallas Page in a tournament final for the vacant title. | |
| 42 | Diamond Dallas Page | April 24, 2000 | Nitro | Rochester, New York | 3 | 1 | This was a steel cage match. | |
| 43 | David Arquette | April 26, 2000 | Thunder | Syracuse, New York | 1 | 12 | This was a tag team match pitting Arquette and Diamond Dallas Page against Eric Bischoff and Jeff Jarrett, in which whoever scored the fall would become champion. Arquette pinned Bischoff to win Page's title. Aired on tape delay on April 26, 2000. | |
| 44 | Jeff Jarrett | May 7, 2000 | Slamboree | Kansas City, Missouri | 2 | 8 | This was a Triple Cage match, also involving Diamond Dallas Page. | |
| 45 | Ric Flair | May 15, 2000 | Nitro | Biloxi, Mississippi | 7 | 7 | Despite being listed as Flair's sixth reign on WWE.com, the match description says that this was Flair's seventh reign. | |
| — | Vacated | May 22, 2000 | Nitro | Grand Rapids, Michigan | — | — | Vince Russo stripped Ric Flair of the title. | |
| 46 | Jeff Jarrett | May 22, 2000 | Nitro | Grand Rapids, Michigan | 3 | 1 | Vince Russo awarded the vacant title to Jarrett, but Kevin Nash stole the title belt. Nash was then forced to face Jarrett in a No Holds Barred match, which Jarrett won. WWE recognizes Jarrett's reign as lasting 2 days, ending on May 24, 2000, when the following episode aired on tape delay. | |
| 47 | Kevin Nash | May 24, 2000 | Thunder | Saginaw, Michigan | 4 | 6 | This was a triangle match, also involving Scott Steiner. | |
| 48 | Ric Flair | May 29, 2000 | Nitro | Salt Lake City, Utah | 8 | <1 | Kevin Nash gave the title to Flair. | |
| 49 | Jeff Jarrett | May 29, 2000 | Nitro | Salt Lake City, Utah | 4 | 41 | David Flair was the special guest referee. | |
| 50 | Booker T | July 9, 2000 | Bash at the Beach | Daytona Beach, Florida | 1 | 50 | Earlier that night, Hollywood Hulk Hogan faced Jeff Jarrett for the title in a controversial match that ended in a shoot. In reality, Vince Russo wanted Hogan to lose to Jarrett, who would then lose to Booker T. However, Hogan refused to job to Jarrett, so Russo told Jarrett to just lie down and let Hogan win. Jarrett lay down and Russo threw the belt in the ring at a confused Hogan, telling Hogan to take the belt. After Hogan pinned Jarrett and was declared new champion, he called out Russo for his poor booking decisions before walking out of WCW. Russo reversed the decision, declaring that Jarrett was still champion. Jarrett then lost the title to Booker T in an impromptu match. | |
| 51 | Kevin Nash | August 28, 2000 | Nitro | Las Cruces, New Mexico | 5 | 20 | Jeff Jarrett was the special guest referee. | |
| 52 | Booker T | September 17, 2000 | Fall Brawl | Buffalo, New York | 2 | 8 | This was a Caged Heat match. | |
| 53 | Vince Russo | September 25, 2000 | Nitro | Uniondale, New York | 1 | 7 | This was a steel cage match. | |
| — | Vacated | October 2, 2000 | Nitro | Daly City, California | — | — | Vince Russo decided he was not a wrestler and he did not want the title. | |
| 54 | Booker T | October 2, 2000 | Nitro | Daly City, California | 3 | 55 | Defeated Jeff Jarrett in a San Francisco 49ers match for the vacant title. | |
| 55 | Scott Steiner | November 26, 2000 | Mayhem | Milwaukee, Wisconsin | 1 | 120 | This was a straitjacket steel cage match. | |
| 56 | Booker T | March 26, 2001 | Nitro | Panama City Beach, Florida | 4 | 120 | This was a winner-take-all match for both the World Heavyweight and Booker's United States Heavyweight championships. This was also the final episode of Nitro, as WCW had been purchased by the WWF on March 23, 2001. The title was then defended on WWF programming, where it was referred to as the WCW Championship. | |
World Wrestling Federation (WWF)
| 57 | Kurt Angle | July 24, 2001 | SmackDown! | Pittsburgh, Pennsylvania | 1 | 6 | Aired on tape delay on July 26, 2001. | |
| 58 | Booker T | July 30, 2001 | Raw Is War | Philadelphia, Pennsylvania | 5 | 20 | | |
| 59 | The Rock | August 19, 2001 | SummerSlam | San Jose, California | 1 | 63 | | |
| 60 | Chris Jericho | October 21, 2001 | No Mercy | St. Louis, Missouri | 1 | 15 | | |
| 61 | The Rock | November 5, 2001 | Raw | Uniondale, New York | 2 | 34 | The title was referred to as the World Championship from November 19, 2001 after the demise of The Alliance. | |
| 62 | Chris Jericho | December 9, 2001 | Vengeance | San Diego, California | 2 | <1 | | |
| — | Unified | December 9, 2001 | Vengeance | San Diego, California | — | — | After defeating The Rock for the World Championship, Chris Jericho defeated Stone Cold Steve Austin to unify the World Championship with the WWF Championship. The World Championship was retired and the WWF Championship became the Undisputed WWF Championship. | |

== Combined reigns ==
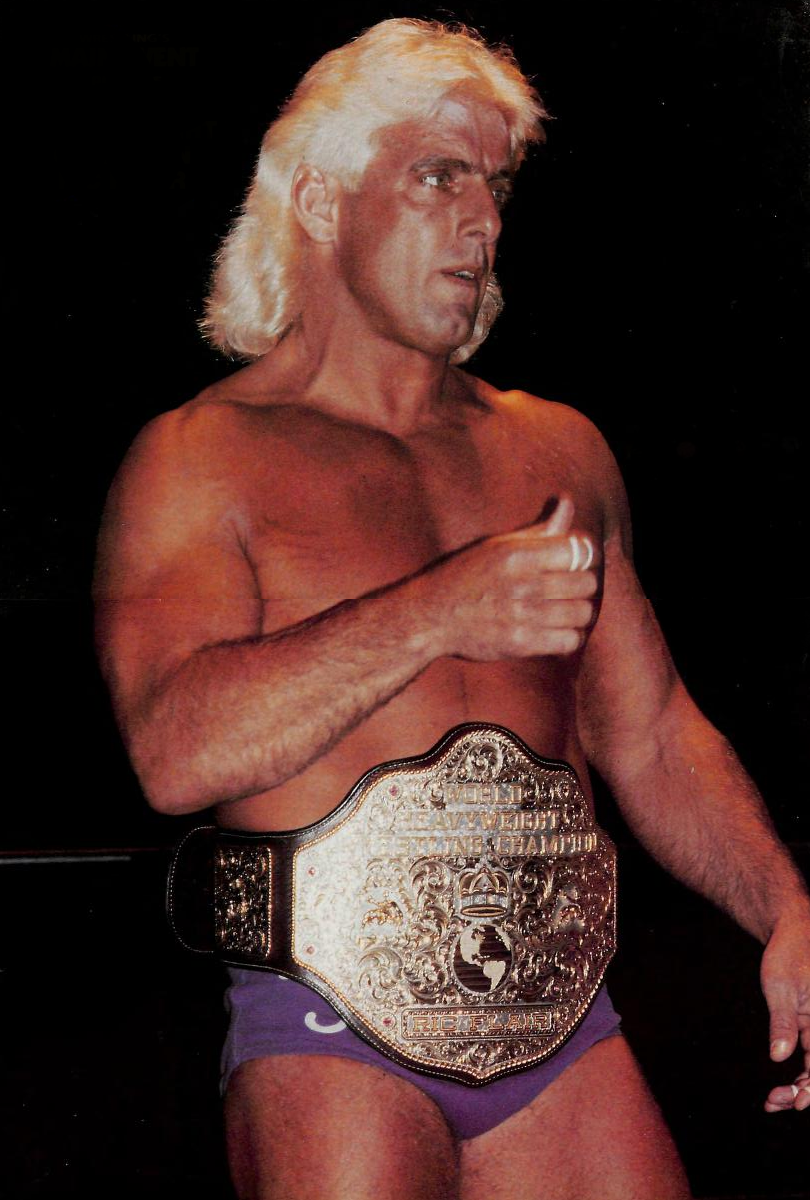
Record eight-time WCW World Heavyweight Champion Ric Flair

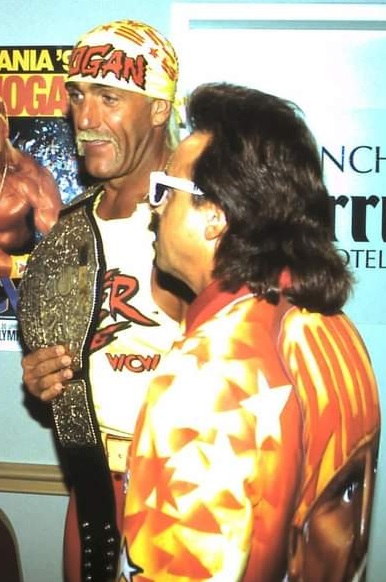
Hulk Hogan, who reigned for a combined 1,177 days as champion. His first reign at 469 days is the longest single reign in the title's history.

| Rank | Wrestler | No. of reigns | Combined days | Combined days recognized by WWE |
|---|---|---|---|---|
| 1 | Hulk Hogan/Hollywood Hogan | 6 | 1,177 | |
| 2 | Ric Flair | 8 (Note: In WCW, Ric Flair was recognized as an eight-time champion, while WWE does not recognize Flair's third reign (they consider it a continuation of his second reign) and first reign (they consider it a continuation of his seventh NWA reign), and thus only recognizes him as a six-time champion.) | 501 | 505 |
| 3 | Big Van Vader | 3 | 377 | |
| 4 | Booker T | 5 | 253 | |
| 5 | Sting | 6 | 250 | |
| 6 | Lex Luger | 2 | 235 | |
| 7 | Goldberg | 1 | 174 | |
| 8 | Ron Simmons | 1 | 150 | |
| 9 | Scott Steiner | 1 | 120 | |
| 10 | The Giant | 2 | 118 | |
| 11 | Kevin Nash | 5 | 97 | 96 |
| 11 | The Rock | 2 | 97 | |
| 13 | Sid Vicious | 2 | 77 | |
| 14 | Jeff Jarrett | 4 | 58 | 59 |
| 15 | Bret Hart | 2 | 56 | |
| 16 | Randy Savage | 4 | 53 | |
| 17 | Diamond Dallas Page | 3 | 29 | 30 |
| 18 | Chris Jericho | 2 | 15 | |
| 19 | David Arquette | 1 | 12 | |
| 20 | Vince Russo | 1 | 7 | |
| 21 | Kurt Angle | 1 | 6 | |
| 22 | Chris Benoit | 1 | 1 | |
