= Bash at the Beach (1995) =

1995 World Championship Wrestling pay-per-view event

- Promotional poster featuring Hulk Hogan, Ric Flair, Randy Savage and Big Van Vader.
- Promotion: World Championship Wrestling
- Date: July 16, 1995
- City: Huntington Beach, California
- Venue: The Beach
- Attendance: 9,500
- Buy rate: 160,000
- Tagline: An Event So Hot, They Had To Put It On The Beach!

Pay-per-view chronology
← Previous; The Great American Bash	Next → Collision in Korea

Bash at the Beach chronology
← Previous; 1994	Next → 1996

The 1995 Bash at the Beach was a professional wrestling pay-per-view (PPV) event produced by World Championship Wrestling (WCW). It was the second Bash at the Beach and took place on July 16, 1995 on the beach in Huntington Beach, California.

Ten professional wrestling matches took place at the event, nine of which were broadcast live on pay-per-view. In the main event, Hulk Hogan defeated Big Van Vader to retain the WCW World Heavyweight Championship, marking Vader's final WCW pay-per-view match. Also featured was Sting defeating Meng to retain the WCW United States Heavyweight Championship, and Harlem Heat defeating The Nasty Boys and The Blue Bloods to retain the WCW World Tag Team Championship.

Scenes featuring Hulk Hogan, Big Van Vader, Randy Savage, Ric Flair and Kevin Sullivan filmed at the event formed part of season 6 episode 17 of Baywatch, also titled "Bash at the Beach", broadcast in February of the following year.

Bash at the Beach (1995) was the last WCW PPV to take place before the Monday Night War era of September 4, 1995 to March 26, 2001, during which WWF Monday Night Raw/WWF Raw Is War and WCW Monday Nitro competed for ratings in a weekly Monday night time slot, which is now widely seen in retrospect as having been a "golden age" of pro wrestling.

== Storylines ==
The event featured professional wrestling matches that involve different wrestlers from pre-existing scripted feuds and storylines. Professional wrestlers portray villains, heroes, or less distinguishable characters in the scripted events that build tension and culminate in a wrestling match or series of matches.

== Event ==
Other on-screen personnel
Role:	Name:
Commentators	Tony Schiavone
Commentators	Bobby Heenan
Interviewer	Gene Okerlund
Ring announcer	David Penzer
Ring announcer	Michael Buffer
Referees	Randy Anderson
Referees	Nick Patrick

=== Pre-show ===
Prior to the pay-per-view, WCW had three matches which aired on Main Event. The first match saw Johnny B. Badd defeat Chris Kanyon followed by Road Warrior Hawk defeating Mark Starr.

During the last match on Main Event, Dick Slater and Bunkhouse Buck defeated Marcus Bagwell and Alex Wright. Following the match Big Van Vader came out and hit the Vaderbomb on both Bagwell and Wright. As three additional wrestlers came out to attempt to stop Vader, they too were hit with a Vaderbomb.

=== Preliminary matches ===
The opening match saw WCW United States Heavyweight Champion Sting retain his title by defeating Meng. Toward the end of the match, Meng went to kick Sting, however Sting was able to step out of the way and used the opening to roll up Meng for the victory. Following the match, Meng attacked Sting, however Hawk came out to save Sting.

The second match saw The Renegade successfully defend his WCW World Television Championship against Paul Orndorff. The Renegade hit a suplex on Orndorff, as Nick Patrick counted two, Orndorff got his shoulder up, however it was out of view from Patrick, who counted three.

During the next match Kamala pinned Jim Duggan after The Zodiac hit Duggan with Kamala's mask.

The following match saw Diamond Dallas Page defeated Dave Sullivan. As Sullivan attempted an inverted bearhug Max Muscle jumped on the ring apron to distract Sullivan. This enabled Page to hit the Diamond Cutter and pick up the victory.

The next match was a triple threat for the WCW World Tag Team Championship. During this match Harlem Heat (Booker T and Stevie Ray) defended their titles against The Nasty Boys (Brian Knobbs and Jerry Sags) and The Blue Bloods (Lord Steven Regal and Robert Eaton). As Saggs covered Booker T, Booker T was on top of Regal, allowing Harlem Heat to pick up the victory, despite the confusion on the part of The Nasty Boys.

=== Main event matches ===
The second to last match was a lumberjack match called a lifeguard match, to go along with the beach theme. Several women in red bathing suits were also around the ring for the match, as this would be included as part of an episode of ‘’Baywatch’’. The match which saw Randy Savage defeat Ric Flair, had the following life guards: Diamond Dallas Page, Booker T, Stevie Ray, Max Muscle, Dave Sullivan, Arn Anderson, Johnny B. Badd, Dick Slater, Bunkhouse Buck, Chris Kanyon, Jim Duggan, Brian Knobbs, Jerry Sags, and Mark Starr.

The main event of the event was a steel cage match for the WCW World Heavyweight Championship between the champion Hulk Hogan and Big Van Vader. During the match The Zodiac and Kevin Sullivan attempted to get involved in the match however Dennis Rodman attacked them with a chair. Ultimately as Vader was on the top rope, Hogan knocked him off, allowing him to climb the cage and escape. Following the match, Ric Flair and Arn Anderson came out to confront Vader for not getting the job done, resulting in Vader challenging both of them.

== Results ==
No.	Results	Stipulations	Times
1^{ME}	Johnny B. Badd defeated Chris Kanyon	Singles match	02:03
2^{ME}	Road Warrior Hawk defeated Mark Starr	Singles match	01:25
3^{ME}	Dick Slater and Bunkhouse Buck (with Col. Robert Parker) defeated Marcus Bagwell and Alex Wright	Tag team match	03:27
4	Sting (c) defeated Meng (with Col. Robert Parker)	Singles match for the WCW United States Heavyweight Championship	15:28
5	The Renegade (c) (with Jimmy Hart) defeated Paul Orndorff	Singles match for the WCW World Television Championship	06:12
6	Kamala (with The Taskmaster) defeated Jim Duggan	Singles match	06:06
7	Diamond Dallas Page (with The Diamond Doll and Max Muscle) defeated Dave Sullivan	Singles match	04:23
8	Harlem Heat (Booker T and Stevie Ray) (c) (with Sister Sherri) defeated The Nasty Boys (Brian Knobbs and Jerry Sags) and The Blue Bloods (Lord Steven Regal and Robert Eaton)	Triangle match for the WCW World Tag Team Championship	13:08
9	Randy Savage defeated Ric Flair	Lifeguard match	13:56
10	Hulk Hogan (c) (with Jimmy Hart) defeated Big Van Vader by escaping the cage	Steel Cage match for the WCW World Heavyweight Championship	13:23
(c) / – the champion(s) heading into the match; ME / – the match was broadcast prior to the pay-per-view on Main Event
