= WCW Bash at the Beach =

Professional wrestling event series

Bash at the Beach
- WCW Bash at the Beach 1997 logo
- Created by: Dusty Rhodes
- Promotions: World Championship Wrestling (1994–2000)
- First event: 1994
- Last event: 2000

Bash at the Beach was a yearly professional wrestling pay-per-view (PPV) event produced by World Championship Wrestling (WCW). It was the company's PPV for the month of July, held from 1994 to 2000. As the title implied, the show centered on a beach theme.

Due to its beach theme, the stage where wrestlers made their entrances was decorated with beach related items, such as surfboards and sand. The beach theme lent to its summer scheduling of July. The theme was also reflected in the places where WCW chose to hold the event; all of the shows emanated from cities in either Florida or California, two U.S. states renowned for their warm weather. It was WCW's response to the World Wrestling Federation's SummerSlam.

== History ==
In 1992 and 1993, World Championship Wrestling (WCW) held a beach-themed pay-per-view show known as Beach Blast, which was the forerunner to Bash at the Beach. The 1992 show was held in June, however, as the company elected instead to reserve July for its flagship summertime extravaganza, The Great American Bash. Along with Slamboree, Starrcade, SuperBrawl, The Great American Bash, and Halloween Havoc, Bash at the Beach was booked to be one of WCW's flagship events.

Bash at the Beach marked three major turning points during Hulk Hogan's career. During 1994 Hogan made his WCW in-ring debut defeating Ric Flair to win his first WCW World Heavyweight Championship. During the 1996 event, Hogan turned heel, as he was revealed to be the third member for the New World Order, leading to WCW overtaking the World Wrestling Federation (WWF) for nearly two years as the top professional wrestling company in the world. The 2000 event was Hogan's final appearance for the company, wherein he defeated Jeff Jarrett for the WCW Championship, but was soon thereafter stripped of the title and was fired on-air by Vince Russo in events which led to litigation between Hogan and WCW, and a series of events whose authenticity are to this day under question.

To promote the 1995 event, Hogan, Randy Savage, Ric Flair, Big Van Vader, and Kevin Sullivan guest starred on season 6 episode 15 of Baywatch, also titled "Bash at the Beach".

== Legacy ==
In March 2001, the WWF acquired WCW and the majority of its assets, which included all of its championships and the intellectual properties for all of their PPVs; the following year, the WWF was renamed to World Wrestling Entertainment (WWE). Although WWE revived some of WCW's old PPVs over the years, such as The Great American Bash, Bash at the Beach was never one that was reused by WWE. However, in 2014, all of WCW's Bash at the Beach pay-per-views were made available on the WWE Network streaming service.

WWE left the Bash at the Beach trademark to expire in 2004/2005 after their purchase of WCW. Cody Rhodes, executive vice president for All Elite Wrestling (AEW), a promotion that was founded in January 2019, trademarked the name in early 2019 for use in the company as it was created by his father, Dusty Rhodes. AEW Bash at the Beach, which was held as a two-part special of AEW's flagship program, Dynamite, took place on January 15, 2020, and continued with Chris Jericho's Rock 'N' Wrestling Rager at Sea on January 22. In August of that year, Cody's trademark was officially denied by the United States Patent and Trademark Office. By November of that year, a settlement was reached between Cody Rhodes and WWE in which Cody gained the "Cody Rhodes" trademark, which WWE had held onto after his run in that company, in exchange for WWE gaining the WCW event name trademarks that Cody had claimed, including Bash at the Beach.

== Events ==
WCW/nWo co-branded event

#	Event	Date	City	Venue	Main event	Ref
1	Bash at the Beach (1994)	July 17, 1994	Orlando, Florida	Amway Arena	Ric Flair (c) vs. Hulk Hogan for the WCW World Heavyweight Championship	
2	Bash at the Beach (1995)	July 16, 1995	Huntington Beach, California	The Beach	Hulk Hogan (c) vs. Vader in a Steel Cage match for the WCW World Heavyweight Championship	
3	Bash at the Beach (1996)	July 7, 1996	Daytona Beach, Florida	Ocean Center	The Outsiders (Kevin Nash and Scott Hall) and Hulk Hogan vs. Sting, Lex Luger and Randy Savage	
4	Bash at the Beach (1997)	July 13, 1997	Daytona Beach, Florida	Ocean Center	Lex Luger and The Giant vs. Dennis Rodman and Hollywood Hogan	
5	Bash at the Beach (1998)	July 12, 1998	San Diego, California	Cox Arena	Dennis Rodman and Hollywood Hogan vs. Diamond Dallas Page and Karl Malone	
6	Bash at the Beach (1999)	July 11, 1999	Fort Lauderdale, Florida	National Car Rental Center	Kevin Nash (c) and Sting vs. Randy Savage and Sid Vicious for the WCW World Heavyweight Championship	
7	Bash at the Beach (2000)	July 9, 2000	Daytona Beach, Florida	Ocean Center	Jeff Jarrett (c) vs. Booker T for the WCW World Heavyweight Championship	
