= Bash at the Beach (1994) =

1994 World Championship Wrestling pay-per-view event

- VHS cover featuring Hulk Hogan and Ric Flair.
- Promotion: World Championship Wrestling
- Date: July 17, 1994
- City: Orlando, Florida
- Venue: Orlando Arena
- Attendance: 14,000
- Buy rate: 225,000
- Tagline: Hulk's WCW Debut!

Pay-per-view chronology
← Previous; Slamboree	Next → Fall Brawl

Bash at the Beach chronology
← Previous; First	Next → 1995

The 1994 Bash at the Beach was a professional wrestling pay-per-view (PPV) event produced by World Championship Wrestling (WCW). It was the inaugural Bash at the Beach and took place on July 17, 1994, from the Orlando Arena in Orlando, Florida.

In 1992 and 1993, WCW held a beach-themed pay-per-view show known as Beach Blast, which was the forerunner to Bash at the Beach. The 1992 show was held in June, however, as the company elected instead to reserve July for its flagship summertime extravaganza, The Great American Bash. Along with Slamboree, Starrcade, SuperBrawl, The Great American Bash, and Halloween Havoc, Bash at the Beach was booked to be one of WCW's flagship events.

This event marked Hulk Hogan's in ring debut for WCW. Tony Schiavone did the play-by-play, while color commentary was split between Bobby Heenan and Jesse Ventura. Ventura was on the outs with WCW management at this time, and he was notably missing from the main event.

== Storylines ==
The event featured professional wrestling matches that involve different wrestlers from pre-existing scripted feuds and storylines. Professional wrestlers portray villains, heroes, or less distinguishable characters in the scripted events that build tension and culminate in a wrestling match or series of matches.

== Event ==
Other on-screen personnel
Role:	Name:
Commentator	Tony Schiavone
Commentator	Bobby Heenan
Commentator	Jesse Ventura
Interviewer	Gene Okerlund
Ring announcer	Gary Michael Cappetta
Ring announcer	Michael Buffer

Prior to the pay-per-view Brian Armstrong and Brad Armstrong defeated Steve Keirn and Bobby Eaton in a dark match.

The pay-per-view opened with Lord Steven Regal retaining the WCW World Television Championship against Johnny B. Badd. This match was originally scheduled to have Sting as the challenger, however Badd substituted due to Sting's eye injury.

The second match was Big Van Vader facing The Guardian Angel. After Angel saw Harley Race with his nightstick, Angel grabbed it back, leading to the referee disqualifying him.

The next match saw Terry Funk and Bunkhouse Buck defeat Dustin Rhodes and Arn Anderson. After Rhodes tagged Anderson, Anderson turned on his partner and attacked him with a DDT. Anderson tagged himself back out and put Funk on top of Rhodes for the win. After the match all three men continued to attack Rhodes.

During the WCW United States Heavyweight Championship match Steve Austin defeated Ricky Steamboat to retain his title. After Steamboat hit a crossbody on Austin, Austin used the momentum to flip Steamboat over and pick up the victory via pinfall.

Pretty Wonderful (Paul Roma and Paul Orndorff) next captured the WCW World Tag Team Championship by defeating Cactus Jack and Kevin Sullivan. While Orndorff covered Jack, Roma held Jack's foot down, outside the referee's view, from the floor.

During the main event, Hulk Hogan made his WCW in-ring debut, and captured the WCW World Heavyweight Championship against Ric Flair. Sensuous Sherri attempted to interfere and help Flair, however she was stopped by Mr. T. This gave Hogan the opportunity to take control of the match and pick up the victory following a legdrop. After the match, Hogan celebrated his victory with Mr. T, Muhammad Ali, Jimmy Hart and Shaquille O'Neal.

== Results ==
No.	Results	Stipulations	Times
1^{D}	Molly McShane (with Ron Diaz) defeated Sassy Boys (Fez Whatley and Fast Eddie) (with Ron Bennington)	Intergender Handicap match with Jimmy Hart as special guest referee	—
2^{D}	Brian Armstrong and Brad Armstrong defeated Steve Keirn and Bobby Eaton	Tag team match	—
3	Lord Steven Regal (c) (with Sir William) defeated Johnny B. Badd	Singles match for the WCW World Television Championship	10:40
4	Big Van Vader (with Harley Race) defeated The Guardian Angel by disqualification	Singles match	07:58
5	Terry Funk and Bunkhouse Buck (with Col. Robert Parker and Meng) defeated Dustin Rhodes and Arn Anderson	Tag team match	11:15
6	Steve Austin (c) defeated Ricky Steamboat	Singles match for the WCW United States Heavyweight Championship	20:06
7	Pretty Wonderful (Paul Roma & Paul Orndorff) defeated Cactus Jack and Kevin Sullivan (c)	Tag team match for the WCW World Tag Team Championship	20:11
8	Hulk Hogan (with Shaquille O'Neal, Mr. T and Jimmy Hart) defeated Ric Flair (c) (with Sensuous Sherri)	Singles match for the WCW World Heavyweight Championship	21:50
(c) / – the champion(s) heading into the match; D / – this was a dark match
