= Bash at the Beach (1997) =

1997 World Championship Wrestling pay-per-view event

- Promotional poster featuring Hollywood Hogan and Dennis Rodman
- Promotion: World Championship Wrestling
- Date: July 13, 1997
- City: Daytona Beach, Florida
- Venue: Ocean Center
- Attendance: 7,851
- Buy rate: 325,000
- Tagline: Hollywood Hogan And Dennis Rodman Crash The Bash!

Pay-per-view chronology
← Previous; The Great American Bash	Next → Road Wild

Bash at the Beach chronology
← Previous; 1996	Next → 1998

The 1997 Bash at the Beach was a professional wrestling pay-per-view (PPV) event produced by World Championship Wrestling (WCW). It was the fourth Bash at the Beach and took place on July 13, 1997 from the Ocean Center in Daytona Beach, Florida.

== Storylines ==
The event featured professional wrestling matches that involve different wrestlers from pre-existing scripted feuds and storylines. Professional wrestlers portray villains, heroes, or less distinguishable characters in the scripted events that build tension and culminate in a wrestling match or series of matches.

== Event ==
Other on-screen personnel
Role:	Name:
Commentators	Tony Schiavone
Commentators	Bobby Heenan
Commentators	Dusty Rhodes
Commentators	Mike Tenay
Interviewer	Gene Okerlund
Ring announcer	Michael Buffer
Ring announcer	David Penzer
Referees	Randy Anderson
Referees	Mark Curtis
Referees	Scott Dickinson
Referees	Mickie Jay
Referees	Jimmy Jett
Referees	Nick Patrick

The first match of the pay-per-view saw Mortis and Wrath defeat Glacier and Ernest Miller. Following Glacier kicking Mortis and Wrath’s manager James Vandenberg off the apron, Mortis hit Glacier with the Cryonic Kick to pick up the victory

The second match was for the WCW Cruiserweight Championship. Chris Jericho retained the championship over Ultimate Dragon after he reversed a hurricanrana into a rollup.

In the following match The Steiner Brothers (Rick Steiner and Scott Steiner) defeated The Great Muta and Masahiro Chono, to earn a shot at the WCW World Tag Team Championship. Scott hit the Frankensteiner on Muta followed by Rick hitting a DDT off the top rope for the pinfall victory.

In a six-man tag match, Juventud Guerrera, Héctor Garza, and Lizmark Jr. next defeated La Parka, Psychosis, and Villano IV. Villano V attempted to switch places with Villano IV during the match, however he was immediately hit with a springboard dropkick into a standing moonsault by Garza, who pinned Villano V for the victory.

The following match was a no disqualification retirement match between Chris Benoit and The Taskmaster. Jacqueline, who came out with the Taskmaster, got into a fight with him during the match, causing her to break a wooden chair over his head. Benoit used this opportunity to hit a headbutt from the corner, to pick up the victory.

The next match saw Jeff Jarrett defending his WCW United States Heavyweight Championship against Steve McMichael. During the match however, Steve’s wife Queen Debra McMichael turned on him, handing a metal briefcase to Jarrett. She then distracted the referee while Jarrett used the briefcase as a weapon on Steve. Jarrett picked up the victory over Steve, which was followed by a celebration by Debra in the ring.

The next match was scheduled to be New World Order members Randy Savage and Scott Hall facing off against Diamond Dallas Page and his mystery partner. Prior to the match, Page announced his mystery partner to be Curt Hennig who was making his WCW debut. Toward the end of the match, as Hennig was running toward the ropes, Page accidentally held down the ropes, causing Hennig to fall outside the ring, hitting the ring apron on his way to the floor. Hennig then got up and hit Page in the back of the head, before leaving ringside for the remainder of the match. This enabled Hall to hit the Outsider’s Edge followed by Savage’s elbow off the top rope, for the pinfall victory.

In the second to last match, Roddy Piper defeated Ric Flair by submission. During the match both Benoit and McMichael attempted to interfere in the match before referee Mark Curtis ejected both of them. Piper ultimately picked up the victory when the referee rang the bell to end the match when Flair's arm went down three times while in the sleeper hold.

The final match of the event saw Lex Luger and The Giant taking on nWo members Hollywood Hogan and Dennis Rodman. Luger and Giant picked up the victory when Hogan tapped out to Luger’s Torture Rack.

== Results ==
No.	Results	Stipulations	Times
1	Mortis and Wrath (with James Vandenberg) defeated Glacier and Ernest Miller	Tag team match	09:47
2	Chris Jericho (c) defeated Último Dragón	Singles match for the WCW Cruiserweight Championship	12:55
3	The Steiner Brothers (Rick Steiner and Scott Steiner) defeated The Great Muta and Masahiro Chono	Tag team match	11:37
4	Juventud Guerrera, Héctor Garza, and Lizmark Jr. defeated La Parka, Psychosis, and Villano IV	Six-man tag team match	10:08
5	Chris Benoit defeated The Taskmaster (with Jacqueline and Jimmy Hart)	Retirement match	13:11
6	Jeff Jarrett (c) defeated Steve McMichael (with Queen Debra McMichael)	Singles match for the WCW United States Heavyweight Championship	06:56
7	nWo (Randy Savage and Scott Hall) (with Miss Elizabeth) defeated Curt Hennig and Diamond Dallas Page (with Kimberly Page)	Tag team match	09:35
8	Roddy Piper defeated Ric Flair by technical submission	Singles match	13:26
9	Lex Luger and The Giant defeated Hollywood Hogan and Dennis Rodman (with Randy Savage) by submission	Tag team match	22:19
(c) / – the champion(s) heading into the match
