= Bash at the Beach (2000) =

2000 World Championship Wrestling pay-per-view event

- Promotional poster featuring Goldberg.
- Promotion: World Championship Wrestling
- Date: July 9, 2000
- City: Daytona Beach, Florida
- Venue: Ocean Center
- Attendance: 6,572
- Buy rate: 110,000
- Tagline: It Ain't No Picnic!

Pay-per-view chronology
← Previous; The Great American Bash	Next → New Blood Rising

Bash at the Beach chronology
← Previous; 1999	Next → Final

The 2000 Bash at the Beach was the seventh and final Bash at the Beach professional wrestling pay-per-view (PPV) event produced by World Championship Wrestling (WCW). It took place on July 9, 2000 from the Ocean Center in Daytona Beach, Florida.

== Event ==
Other on-screen personnel
Role:	Name:
Commentators	Tony Schiavone
Commentators	Scott Hudson
Commentators	Mark Madden
Interviewers	Gene Okerlund
Interviewers	Pamela Paulshock
Referees	Mickie Jay
Referees	Mark Johnson
Referees	Charles Robinson
Referees	Billy Silverman
Referees	Jamie Tucker
Ring announcers	Michael Buffer
Ring announcers	David Penzer

Scott Steiner was disqualified when he used the Steiner Recliner, which had previously been banned. WCW Commissioner Ernest Miller stripped Steiner of the WCW United States Championship following the match. Vampiro won the Graveyard match when the Demon did not show up to the ring; most of this match was pre-taped before the show at an outdoor location.

Kevin Nash faced Goldberg in the tenth match, in which Scott Hall's WCW contract was on the line (though Hall actually left WCW earlier in the year). After attempting to use the Jackknife Powerbomb on Goldberg, Scott Steiner betrayed Nash by attacking him from behind, turning heel and costing Nash the match. As a result, Scott Hall's contract was terminated after being torn up by Goldberg.

=== Controversy ===
Prior to the event going on the air, there was a backstage dispute between Hollywood Hogan and head of WCW creative, Vince Russo. Hogan wanted to win the WCW World Heavyweight Championship in his match against Jeff Jarrett and leave the pay-per-view as champion, but Russo wanted to have Jarrett retain it and later lose it to Booker T that same night. Russo told Hogan that he was going to have Jarrett lie down for him to work a real conflict, although Jarrett was not told it was a work. When the bell rang, Jarrett lay down in the middle of the ring while Russo threw the WCW World title belt into the ring and yelled to Hogan from ringside to pin Jarrett. A visibly confused Hogan complied, placing a foot on Jarrett's chest after getting on the microphone and telling Russo, "Is this your idea, Russo? That's why this company is in the damn shape it's in, because of bullshit like this!" After winning and being announced as the new WCW World Heavyweight Champion, Hogan immediately took the WCW World Heavyweight Championship belt.

Moments later, Russo returned to the ring, angrily proclaiming this would be the last time fans would ever see "that piece of shit" in a WCW arena ever again. Hogan claims the shoot promo from Russo was cut without his permission (something Russo would have needed, as Hogan had a creative control clause in his contract), and that Hogan became legitimately angry with Russo and had left WCW following the incident. This led to Hogan filing a defamation of character lawsuit against Russo and WCW's parent company, Turner/Time Warner. The incident surrounding Bash at the Beach became subject to a season 4 episode of Dark Side of the Ring.

== Results ==
No.	Results	Stipulations	Times
1	Lieutenant Loco (c) defeated Juventud Guerrera by pinfall	Singles match for the WCW Cruiserweight Championship	12:07
2	Big Vito (c) defeated Norman Smiley and Ralphus by pinfall	Hardcore match for the WCW Hardcore Championship	05:56
3	Daffney (with Crowbar) defeated Ms. Hancock (with David Flair)	Wedding Gown match	04:14
4	KroniK (Brian Adams and Bryan Clark) defeated The Perfect Event (Shawn Stasiak and Chuck Palumbo) (c) by pinfall	Tag team match for the WCW World Tag Team Championship	13:34
5	Chris Kanyon defeated Booker T by pinfall	Singles match	10:04
6	Mike Awesome defeated Scott Steiner (c) (with Midajah) by disqualification	Singles match for the WCW United States Heavyweight Championship	09:09
7	Vampiro defeated The Demon	Graveyard match	08:07
8	Shane Douglas defeated Buff Bagwell by pinfall	Singles match	07:52
9	Hollywood Hogan defeated Jeff Jarrett (c) by pinfall (Note: Vince Russo later reversed the decision, returning the WCW World Heavyweight Championship to Jarrett following a shoot incident.)	Singles match for the WCW World Heavyweight Championship	01:19
10	Goldberg defeated Kevin Nash by pinfall	Singles match for Scott Hall's WCW contract (Note: Since Nash lost the match, Scott Hall's contract was terminated.)	05:27
11	Booker T defeated Jeff Jarrett (c) by pinfall	Singles match for the WCW World Heavyweight Championship	13:41
(c) / – the champion(s) heading into the match
