= Vince Russo =

American professional wrestling writer (born 1961)

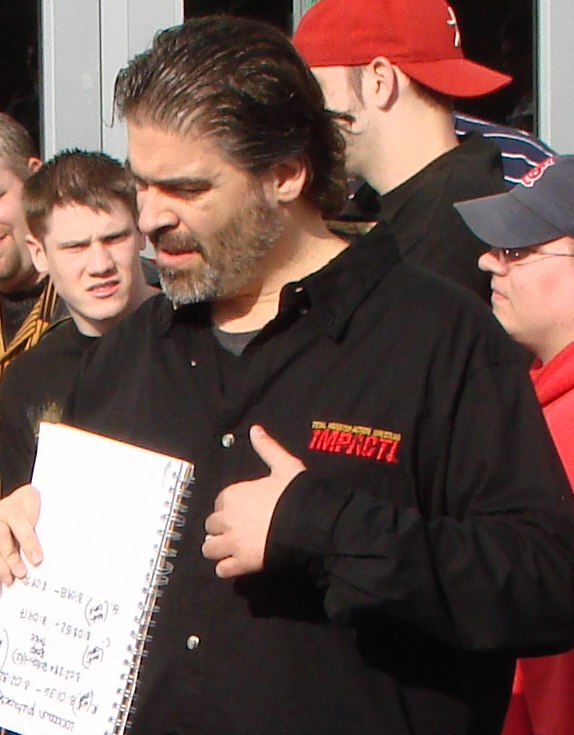
- Russo in 2007

Personal information
- Born: Vincent James Russo; January 24, 1961 (age 65) Long Island, New York, U.S.
- Spouse: Amy Russo (m. 1983)
- Children: 3
- Website: russosbrand.com

Professional wrestling career
- Ring name(s): Vic Venom; Vicious Vincent; Vince Russo; Mr. Wrestling III; The Powers That Be
- Billed height: 6 ft 2 in (188 cm)
- Billed weight: 220 lb (100 kg)

Vincent James Russo (born January 24, 1961) is an American professional wrestling writer, booker, and pundit. He is working for Juggalo Championship Wrestling where he serves as an authority figure and co-owner. He is notable for his tenures in creative roles with the World Wrestling Federation (WWF, now WWE), World Championship Wrestling (WCW), and Total Nonstop Action Wrestling (TNA). He also occasionally made appearances as an on-screen authority figure, and professional wrestler, in WCW and TNA. During a self-booked in-ring career in WCW, Russo became a one-time WCW World Heavyweight Champion.

Russo's writing style often blurs the line between reality and fiction, while also favoring elements such as shock twists, grand moments, and larger-than-life characters over in-ring action, which made him a controversial figure among some wrestling fans. Russo was part of the WWF's creative department during the widely acclaimed Attitude Era, during which the company achieved record high television ratings.

== Early life ==
Vincent James Russo is of Italian descent, grew up in Farmingville, New York, and graduated from the University of Southern Indiana (then known as Indiana State University Evansville) in 1983 with a degree in journalism. He worked for the school newspaper The Shield as an assistant sports editor and later editor-in-chief.

Russo got his start in professional wrestling when he began training with Johnny Rodz at Gleason's Gym in Brooklyn. He owned two video stores on Long Island. Russo also hosted his own local radio show from 1992 to 1993 called Vicious Vincent's World of Wrestling, which aired Sunday nights on WGBB in Freeport. The program ran for exactly one year, the final show being the one-year anniversary.

== Professional wrestling career ==
=== World Wrestling Federation (1992–1999) ===
In 1992, Russo was hired as a freelance writer for WWF Magazine after writing Linda McMahon a letter, and he became an editor in 1994 under the pseudonym Vic Venom. He was promoted to the WWF Creative Team in 1996. That year, Monday Night Raw hit a ratings low of 1.8, as Monday Nitro (Raw's chief competition), was in the midst of an 83-week winning streak against Raw head-to-head (see Monday Night War). With World Championship Wrestling (WCW) eclipsing the WWF, WWF chairman Vince McMahon asked Russo to make changes to the televised product. Russo contributed edgy, controversial storylines involving sexual content, profanity, swerves or unexpected heel turns, and worked shoots, as well as short matches, backstage vignettes, and shocking angles and levels of depicted violence. Russo's style of writing came to be known as "Crash TV" and was heavily inspired by The Jerry Springer Show. "Crash TV" centered on Russo's philosophy that every character on WWF television should be involved in a storyline (feud). This contrasted conventional wrestling booking, which typically saw a number of matches between wrestlers who were not necessarily in feuds. Russo believed that if storyline material were constantly on screen, the audience would be more reluctant to change the channel for fear of missing something.

In 1997, Russo became head writer for the WWF and wrote its flagship show Raw Is War as well as its monthly pay-per-views. With the angles he created, Russo had a big part in putting WWF ahead of WCW in the Monday night rating war during the Attitude Era. In a 2015 interview with Jeff Lane, Russo said the first thing he wrote as WWF head writer was the episode of Raw that aired on December 15, 1997. At the King of the Ring pay-per-view in 1998, Ed Ferrara joined the WWF creative team and was paired with Russo. Some of the more controversial characters during this time, often cited by Russo's critics, include Sable, Val Venis, and The Godfather. Russo devised the Brawl for All tournament, and contributed to the formation of D-Generation X (DX), The Undertaker vs. Kane feud, the Stone Cold Steve Austin vs. Mr. McMahon feud, the rise of The Rock, and Mick Foley's three-face pushes. In the two years after Russo's promotion to head writer, Raw surpassed WCW's Nitro in head-to-head ratings. In October 1999, Russo was replaced by Chris Kreski as WWF head writer, after Russo departed the company.

=== World Championship Wrestling (1999–2000) ===
==== Hiring and arrival ====
On October 3, 1999, Russo and Ed Ferrara signed with WCW; Russo contends that his reason for leaving the WWF was a dispute with Vince McMahon over the increased workload caused by the introduction of the new SmackDown! broadcast and McMahon's disregard of Russo's family. Russo and Ferrara attempted to use the same "Crash TV" style on Monday Nitro, which was similar to Raw Is War but at an accelerated pace, including soapier storylines, lengthier non-wrestling segments, constant heel/face turns, more female representation, fake retirements, more backstage vignettes, expanded storyline depth, constant title changes, and using midcard talent more effectively. Russo and Ferrara often poked fun at the WWF.

Russo's writing style created a large turnover in title changes, reflecting his "crash TV" philosophy. His booking of Jushin Thunder Liger losing and regaining the IWGP Junior Heavyweight Championship on Nitro in late 1999 was not recognized by New Japan Pro-Wrestling (NJPW) in the title lineage until 2007; Liger lost the title to Juventud Guerrera, a luchador, after being hit on the head with a tequila bottle. Swerves and scenarios treated as "shoots" were heavily emphasized, as wrestlers supposedly gave unscripted interviews using "insider" terms recognized only by the Internet smarks; chaotic broadcasts became the norm.

==== Walkout and return ====
In January 2000, Russo received two phone calls, one from Bret Hart (then WCW World Heavyweight Champion) and one from Jeff Jarrett (then WCW United States Heavyweight Champion), both saying they were injured, could not wrestle, and had to vacate their championships. This required Russo to alter his plans for Hart and the New World Order. Russo and his booking committee sat down to determine what would now happen at Souled Out. One of the ideas included putting the now-vacated WCW Title on the shoot fighter Tank Abbott, a former UFC fighter. In an attempt to do something believable, the idea was originally to have a "rumble match" in which Sid Vicious would be an early entrant in the match and would last all the way to the end, when Abbott would come into the match and eliminate him with one punch. Russo said that Abbott might not have held the belt for more than 24 hours if this title change had actually occurred. But the day after he and his committee came up with the idea, he was asked to work in a committee and no longer be head writer. Russo declined the offer and left the company, with his immediate replacement being Kevin Sullivan, who along with other bookers chose Chris Benoit to win the title from Vicious in a singles bout with Arn Anderson as referee.

Sullivan was relieved of his duties in March 2000 and Russo returned as lead writer, alongside the returning Eric Bischoff. The idea was that Russo and Bischoff would reboot WCW into a more modern, streamlined company that would allow younger talent to work with established stars. On the April 10, 2000, WCW Monday Nitro episode, Russo was introduced as an on-screen antagonist authority figure. Notable storyline points for his character include "The New Blood vs. The Millionaire's Club"; his feud with Ric Flair, in which he and David Flair shaved Ric's hair and Reid Flair's hair; his feud with Goldberg; and his short reign as world champion. On May 8, 2000, Russo booked Miss Elizabeth in her first official wrestling match against Daffney. Elizabeth left the company shortly thereafter.

==== Bash at the Beach 2000 incident ====
At Bash at the Beach 2000, Russo was involved in an incident with Hollywood Hogan where Hogan was booked to lose a match against reigning WCW World Heavyweight Champion Jeff Jarrett. Hogan refused to lose the match (invoking his contract's "creative control" clause to override Russo), due to Russo's apparent lack of direction for Hogan's character following the planned loss. In the end, Russo booked Jarrett to literally lie down for Hogan, which resulted in Hogan doing a worked shoot on Russo saying, "That's why this company is in the damn shape it's in; because of bullshit like this" and scoring the pinfall victory by placing his foot on Jarrett's chest. Russo came out later in the broadcast to nullify the match's result, as he publicly fired Hogan. This action restored the title to Jarrett, which set up a new title match between Jarrett and Booker T, with Booker T winning the match and the title.

As Russo promised, Hogan never resurfaced in WCW and even sued Russo for defamation. The suit was dismissed in 2003 as "groundless". Hogan claims in his autobiography Hollywood Hulk Hogan that Russo turned the angle into a shoot, and that he was double-crossed by Turner executive Brad Siegel, who did not want to use him anymore due to his costs per appearance. Bischoff wrote in his autobiography, Controversy Creates Ca$h, that Hogan winning and leaving with the title was a work that would result in his return several months later and that the plan was to crown a new champion at Halloween Havoc, where Hogan would come out at the end of the show and win a champion vs. champion match—but that Russo coming out to fire him was in fact a shoot which led to Hogan's lawsuit. Bischoff says he and Hogan celebrated after the event over the angle, but were distraught to hear of Russo's in-ring shoot after Hogan left the arena. Mike Awesome, cousin to Hogan's nephew Horace Hogan (who also left WCW after the incident) also alleged in a shoot interview published by Highspots that the disputes and the incident affected his WCW run, as Russo allegedly took out his problems with Hulk Hogan on Awesome, saying he was "too close of kin" to Hogan, by portraying several poorly received gimmicks.

==== World Heavyweight Champion, injury, and departure ====
In mid-2000, Russo entered into an angle with Ric Flair. The angle notably included Russo sending cops to the ring to arrest Flair during the wedding of Stacy Keibler and Flair's son David. In August 2000 at New Blood Rising, Russo entered into a feud with Goldberg after confronting Goldberg when the wrestler left a match and "refused to follow the script." The next PPV, Fall Brawl, saw Russo interfere in Goldberg's match against Scott Steiner, costing Goldberg the match. On the September 18, 2000, episode of Nitro, Russo was in a tag match alongside Sting and Booker T versus Scott Steiner and Jeff Jarrett, with the wrestler getting the pin receiving a shot at Booker T's WCW World Heavyweight Championship. Russo won after Booker T dragged an unconscious Russo onto Steiner for the three count. The following week, Russo faced Booker T in a steel cage match for the WCW World Heavyweight Championship. The match did not appear to have a clear winner as Russo was speared by Goldberg through the side of the cage at the same time Booker T exited the cage. Two days later on Thunder, Russo was announced as the winner and new champion.

Russo's reign was short lived, and Russo announced he was vacating the title immediately after, as he was not a wrestler. Russo suffered a severe concussion from the spear spot, and took time off because of post-concussion syndrome. Russo's run as head writer and fledgling in-ring career came to a halt after the concussion and other injuries. AOL Time Warner bought out Russo's contract shortly after the WCW buyout in May 2001.

=== Return to WWE (2002) ===
Russo later returned to WWE in June 2002 as a consultant to oversee creative direction of both Raw and SmackDown!, but quickly left after two weeks, after stating that there was "no way in the world that this thing would work out". The major storyline idea he proposed was an entire restart of the WCW Invasion, featuring previously unsigned talent such as Bill Goldberg, Scott Steiner, Eric Bischoff and Bret Hart. After feeling disrespected during a phone call with Stephanie McMahon, Russo then left of his own accord (turning down a $125,000 per year stay-at-home 'advisory' role with WWE in favor of a $100,000 per year full-time position with TNA).

=== Total Nonstop Action Wrestling (2002–2014) ===
==== Writing and on-screen character ====
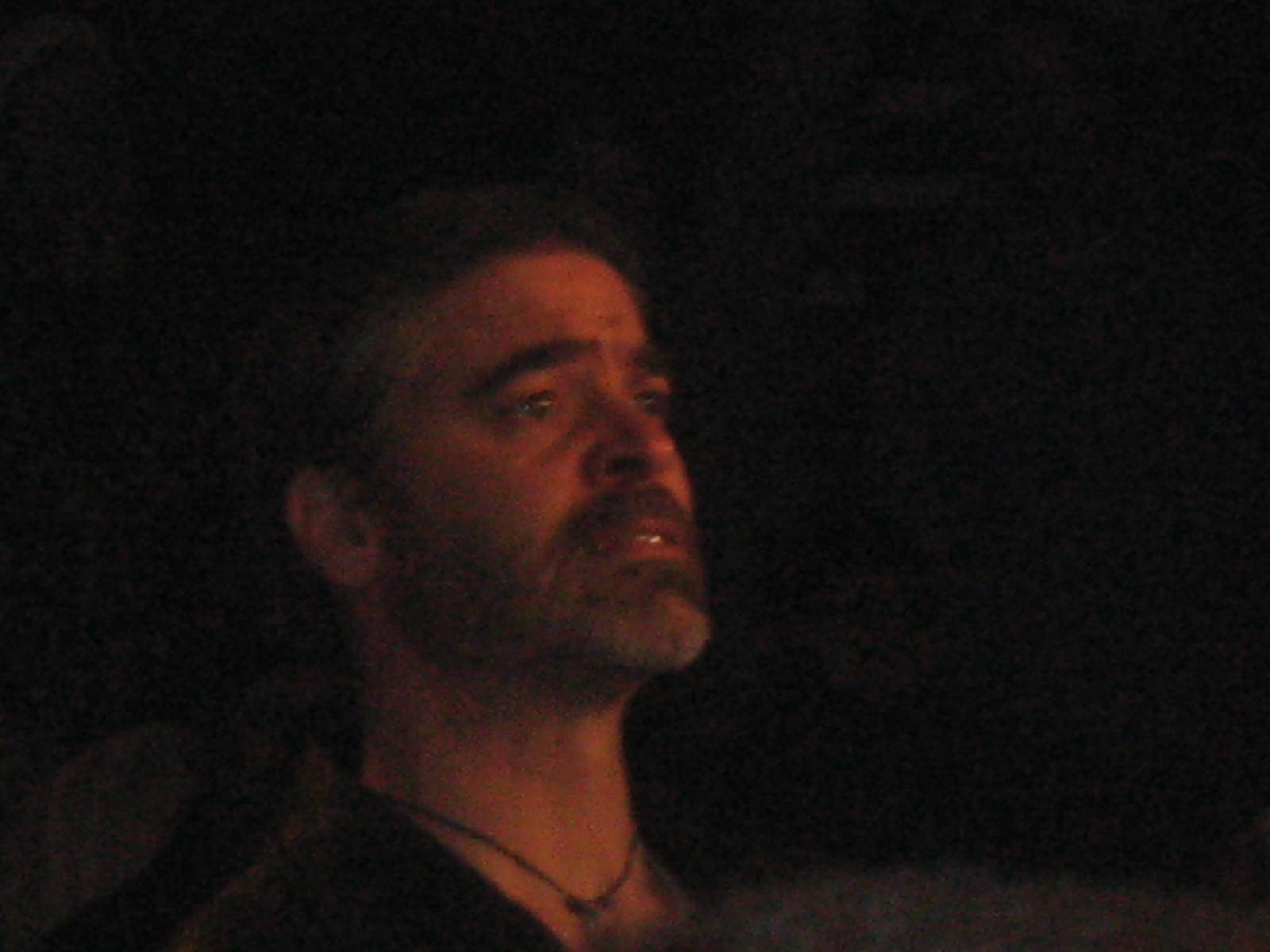
Russo at a TNA event

In July 2002, Russo joined Jeff and Jerry Jarrett's NWA-TNA promotion as a creative writer and would assist in the writing and production of the shows. Russo claims that the name "Total Nonstop Action" came from him and that the original concept was, as they were exclusive to pay-per-view, to be an edgier product than WWE; the initials of the company "TNA" being a play on "T&A", short for "Tits and Ass". Throughout the first few years, there were numerous reports of a creative power struggle over the direction of the programming.

During the time when these rumors circulated, Russo eventually debuted as an on-screen character when the mysterious masked wrestler "Mr. Wrestling III" helped Jeff Jarrett win the NWA World Heavyweight Championship and was eventually unveiled as him. In the on-screen story, Jarrett did not want Russo's help which led to the two become involved in a feud. Russo created his own faction of wrestlers he dubbed Sports Entertainment Xtreme (S.E.X.), recruiting the likes of Glenn Gilbertti, Sonny Siaki, B.G. James, Raven, Trinity, and others. S.E.X. faced the more traditional TNA wrestlers led by Jeff Jarrett. Eventually, Russo would leave his on-screen role and Gilbertti would become the leader of S.E.X. instead. After leaving for a brief period, Russo returned as an on-screen character on the May 28, 2003, pay-per-view where he would hit Raven with a baseball bat helping Gilbertti become the number one contender for the world championship. The next week on June 4, 2003, when Gilbertti fought Jarrett for the world championship, Russo would hit Gilbertti with a baseball bat which in turn helped Jarrett retain his belt. On the following week's pay-per-view (June 11, 2003), when A.J. Styles and Raven fought Jarrett for the world title in a triple threat match, Russo teased hitting Styles with Jarrett's trademark guitar, but eventually hit Jarrett leading Styles to win the world championship belt.

Russo would then manage NWA World Heavyweight Champion A.J. Styles for the remainder of his 2003 run and S.E.X. was quietly written out of the storylines. On October 1, 2003, Russo suffered the first loss of his in-ring career in a tag team match against Dusty Rhodes and Jeff Jarrett, although his partner, Styles, yielded the pin. On the October 15, 2003, pay-per-view, Russo made his final appearance of that year in a street-fight with Jarrett. It was reported that Russo was written out of the company as a result of Hulk Hogan's signing and because Hogan reportedly said that he would not work for TNA as long as Russo was involved with the company. In February 2004, shortly after Hogan was not able to commit with TNA, Russo would eventually return but strictly as an on-air character, becoming the "Director of Authority" in the storylines. This time, he was a face, claiming to have changed his ways (which was likely inspired by Russo's real-life conversion to Christianity). However, he would disappear again in late 2004 when Dusty Rhodes was "voted" the new D.O.A. over himself at the three-hour November 2004 pay-per-view Victory Road in an interactive "election" on TNA's website. Russo left the company after the 2004 Victory Road pay-per-view. In a November 2005 interview, Russo states that he never wrote a single show on his own during this period at TNA and described his time there as a "total nightmare."

==== Return as a creative writer ====
On September 21, 2006, TNA president Dixie Carter re-signed Russo as a writer on the TNA creative team. Russo was paired with Dutch Mantell and Jeff Jarrett on the TNA creative team. During the March 2007 TNA pay-per-view Destination X on the "Last Rites" match with Abyss and Sting, "Fire Russo!" chants erupted from the crowd in the arena at Orlando indicating the fans' frustration with the incidents that occurred during the match.

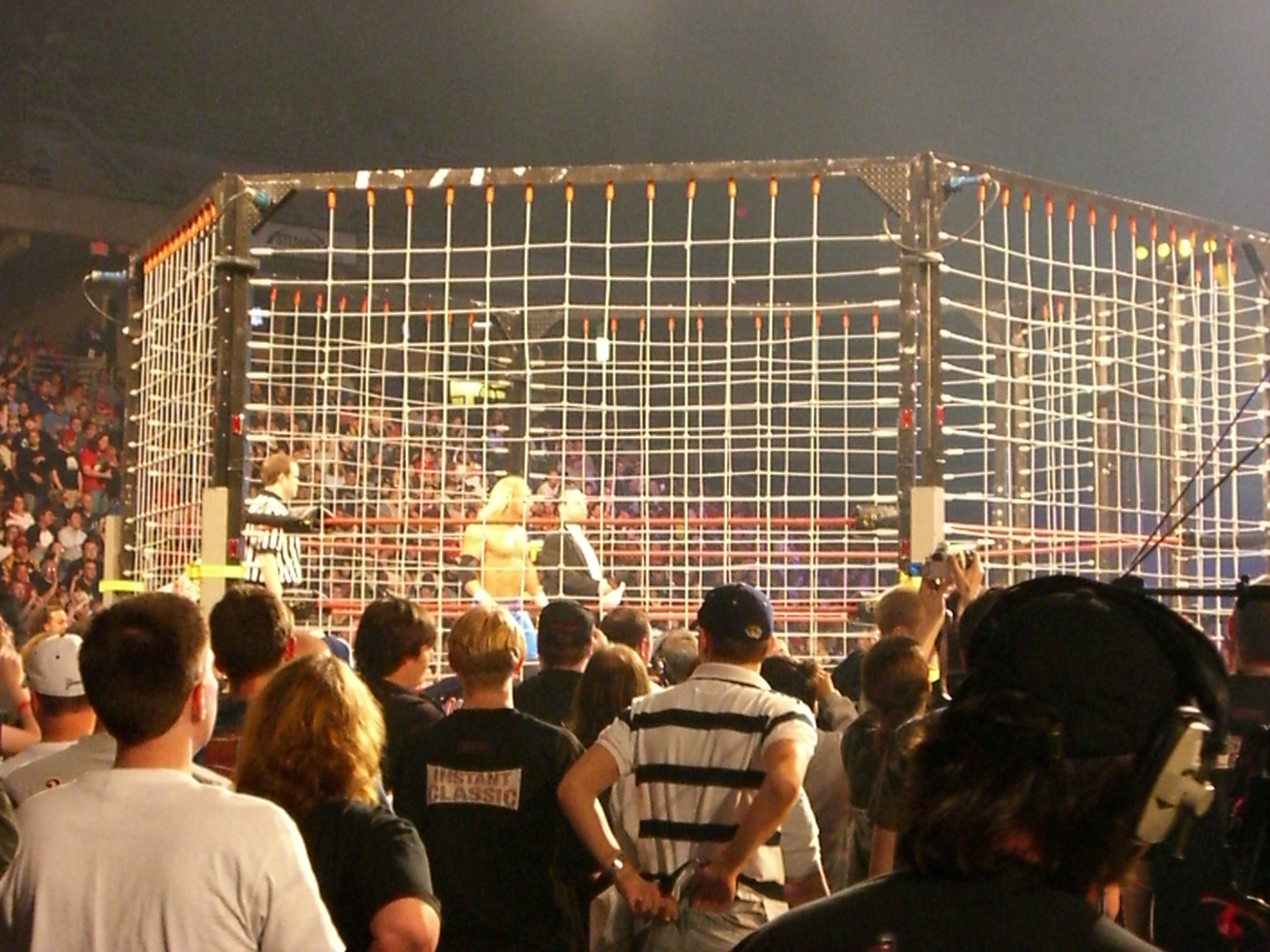
TNA's "electrified" steel cage match, as seen at Lockdown in 2007

Another time the "Fire Russo!" chants were heard was at the following month's pay-per-view Lockdown that was held in St. Louis on April 15, 2007. The chants were heard during the electrified steel cage match with Team 3D and The LAX where the lights would flicker on-and-off whenever a wrestler touched the cage giving the impression of electrocution. Dixie Carter has since noted that gimmick was created by writer Dutch Mantell. In a 2011 interview, Mantell denied this and the two proceeded to argue over Twitter for several months after this. Russo became head of creative for TNA sometime during July 2009. On addressing the "Fire Russo!" chants, Russo said he was not head of creative during that time, and when the idea of the electrified steel cage was presented to him, he said that there was no way that the concept could have been done in a believable manner and that he was often blamed for ideas that he never even came up with. At the September 2009 No Surrender pay-per-view, Ed Ferrara joined TNA and began working on the creative team with Vince Russo and junior contributor Matt Conway.

On October 27, 2009, Hulk Hogan and Eric Bischoff signed with TNA and were paired with Russo, whom they had conflicted with in WCW and had not worked with since they departed the company after Bash at the Beach 2000. In 2010, when asked about his relationship with Russo at TNA, Hogan said he came to TNA in peace, that the writing staff of Russo, Ed Ferrara, Matt Conway, and Jeremy Borash have really "stepped it up", and that Hogan loved Russo "from a distance". According to Russo, the three met together and worked out their differences. While working with Russo, Bischoff also stated in a February 2010 interview that it was a "very positive experience" and that their collaborations were productive. By October 6, 2011, Russo had stepped down to the role of a contributing writer, with Bruce Prichard taking over the head writer's role. On February 14, 2012, TNA president Dixie Carter explained that TNA and Russo had mutually parted ways during the week.

==== Secret return ====
In April 2014, the PWInsider website claimed that Russo was working as a consultant for TNA Wrestling. Russo denied the reports. On July 15, PWInsider reported that Russo had accidentally sent an email to them with instructions on how TNA's commentators work. As a result, and after trying to state that he was not involved with TNA, Russo admitted on his website that he was already working as a consultant for TNA Wrestling to work with TNA's commentators and that one of TNA's conditions was that Russo was to keep his involvement confidential. In less than two days, Russo's statement was removed from his website. On July 30, 2014, Russo claimed that he was "officially done" with TNA. Not long after, Russo revealed that he had been working for TNA since October 24, 2013, claiming that he had been involved in creative meetings and also critiqued the weekly episodes of Impact Wrestling. Russo stated that he was getting paid about $3,000 a month, averaging to $36,000 a year, to be a consultant with TNA.

=== Aro Lucha (2017–2018) ===
On December 8, 2017, Russo signed with the Nashville, Tennessee-based Aro Lucha promotion as a script consultant. On April 5, 2018, Aro Lucha's CEO, Jason Brown, explained via a question and answer session on WeFunder (a crowd-funding website), that Russo had been hired as an independent contractor, not as an employee. As of April 2018, Russo is no longer with the promotion.

=== Juggalo Championship Wrestling (2025–2026) ===
On October 26, 2025, it was announced that Russo was an investor for Juggalo Championship Wrestling, an independent wrestling promotion owned by the Michigan-based hip hop duo Insane Clown Posse. He has since made regular appearances as an on-screen authority figure on JCW's weekly show Lunacy.

On September 22, 2026, Russo announced his departure from JCW on his social media, after receiving questions about his status within the promotion. Russo claimed that he was "unhappy for a while," and spoke to Violent J, as the two agreed to end their working relationship.

== Other media ==
=== Online work ===
In 2014, Russo wrote a series of pro wrestling columns for What Culture, a UK-based website. He wrote a weekly column for Chris Jericho's website Web Is Jericho until 2023. Since 2015, Russo has hosted numerous daily podcasts for his podcast network Vince Russo's The Brand, formerly The RELM Network. He also briefly hosted a podcast on the website Fightful Wrestling in 2016.

Russo discusses professional wrestling, entertainment, and more on his podcasting network "Channel Attitude", and also does podcasts reviewing Raw and discussing wrestling news on Sportskeeda. His podcast featured wrestling personalities including the "Disco Inferno" Glenn Gilbertti, Justin Credible, EC3, Stevie Richards, Al Snow, and Stevie Ray.

=== Books ===
Russo has written three autobiographies, including Forgiven: One Man's Journey from Self-Glorification to Sanctification (2005). Documenting his early life, his WWF run, and becoming a born-again Christian, the book was perceived by some as critical of the wrestling business. It was originally titled Welcome To Bizarroland, but the title and content were revised to reflect Russo's newfound faith. Russo's second book, Rope Opera: How WCW Killed Vince Russo (2010), chronicles his tenure with WCW and TNA Wrestling. The title stems from the title of a TV series idea Russo pitched to networks during his WWF tenure. ''Total Nonstop Agony'' tells of Russo's time in TNA.

== Personal life ==
Russo is an American of Italian descent. His maternal grandfather was Sicilian. He has been married to his wife Amy since 1983. They have three children. In October 2003, Russo became a Born Again Christian. In 2004, he formed a short-lived online Christian ministry titled Forgiven. In late 2005, he produced two shows for his Christian Ring of Glory independent promotion. Russo was close friends with Joanie Laurer, professionally known as Chyna before her death in 2016.

Russo worked with Jim Cornette in the WWF during the 1990s and in TNA Wrestling during the early 2000s. They regularly conflicted over their opposing views on the wrestling business. In 2010, a law firm accused Cornette of making a "terroristic threat" after writing a letter saying, "I want Vince Russo to die. If I could figure out a way to murder him without going to prison, I would consider it the greatest accomplishment of my life." In 2017, Russo filed a restraining order against Cornette after repeated verbal threats of physical harm to him and his family. Cornette, in return, has sold copies of the order to raise money for charity. Their real-life rivalry featured in two episodes of Vice TV's Dark Side of the Ring documentary series covering the Montreal Screwjob and the WWF Brawl for All, which aired in 2019 and 2020, including a promise by Cornette to urinate on Russo's gravestone.

== Legacy in professional wrestling ==
Russo is among the most controversial figures in wrestling. He often says the show's story and character elements are what draw viewers, and thus emphasizes entertainment over the in-ring aspect. Newsday wrote, "Despite scripting some of the most successful WWF television programs in history, and later doing the same for WCW and TNA, Russo remains one of wrestling's most reviled personalities for his sometimes unconventional take on the wrestling business." According to Russo, one reason he is reviled is his take on the WWE product; he believes there is too much actual wrestling and not enough storylines. In Rope Opera, he writes that he has been called both "the savior of the WWF" and "the man who destroyed WCW". WWE credits Russo with many of the Attitude Era's storylines. Likewise, Bob Kapur of Slam! Wrestling gives Russo credit for the company turning away from the cartoonish style of the early-mid 1990s and bringing more mature storylines and characters to the promotion. WWF's The Rock spoke fondly of working with Russo, praising his "crazy out of box ideas".

Gene Okerlund claimed in 2004 that Russo's ideas were successful in the WWF because Vince McMahon was able to control them, while Ric Flair doubted Russo's WWF influence during their time together in WCW, later blaming Russo for the disorganization of WCW. Eric Bischoff has said that Russo was hired at WCW by overstating his influence in WWF, which Bischoff called "fraudulent." Wrestling promoters Tony Khan and Jody Hamilton have criticized Russo's role in the downfall of WCW, and TNA co-founder Jerry Jarrett expressed regret at the decision of bringing Russo in.

Russo's decision to have David Arquette win the WCW World Heavyweight Championship was viewed as highly controversial, though Russo defended his decision, citing that mainstream American newspapers covered the story. WrestleCrap named Arquette the worst wrestling champion of all time and called Russo's decision a "monumentally damaging blow to a company that was already at death's door." WWE's Rise and Fall of WCW documentary also largely blamed Russo for the decline of WCW, prompting DVD Talk critic Nick Hartel to write that "while Russo deserves a lot of blame, he was not the only one in charge." R. D. Reynolds was also critical of many of Russo's booking decisions but stated that Turner Broadcasting executive Jamie Kellner's decision to cancel WCW programs from Turner Networks was ultimately responsible for WCW's death. Regarding his time in WCW, Russo personally said, "WCW and I were never on the same page; it was just that simple".

Booker T credits Russo for his rise to main event status, saying, "if it weren't for Vince Russo, perhaps I would have never been the world champion... at all, ever!" Russo thanked Booker for the compliment and has since called Booker's coronation as WCW Champion at Bash at the Beach 2000 "the proudest moment of my career, and the greatest contribution I was able to make to the business." Former TNA President Dixie Carter called Russo "incredibly talented" in 2014 but said his presence "proved to be too distracting to continue a working relationship"; when asked if Russo could return to the promotion she said "never say never". Various wrestlers who worked with Russo in TNA have spoken fondly of him, including Hernandez, Kurt Angle, and AJ Styles. Velvet Sky and Angelina Love credit Russo for being supportive of TNA's Knockouts division.

== Championships and accomplishments ==
- World Championship Wrestling
  - WCW World Heavyweight Championship (1 time)
- Wrestling Observer Newsletter
  - Worst Gimmick (1999) as The Powers That Be
  - Worst On Interviews (2000)
  - Worst Non-Wrestling Personality (2000)
