= Todd Okerlund =

American ice hockey player (born 1964)

- Born: September 6, 1964 (age 61) Burnsville, Minnesota, U.S.
- Height: 5 ft 11 in (180 cm)
- Weight: 200 lb (91 kg; 14 st 4 lb)
- Position: Right wing
- Shot: Right
- Played for: New York Islanders
- National team: United States
- NHL draft: 168th overall, 1982; New York Islanders
- Playing career: 1987–1988

Todd Eugene Okerlund (born September 6, 1964) is an American former professional ice hockey right winger.

== Playing career ==
Okerlund was drafted 168th overall by the New York Islanders in the 1982 NHL entry draft and then spent four seasons playing for the University of Minnesota. However, his pro career was cut short due to a chronic knee injury. He played one professional season, playing 13 games for the Springfield Indians of the American Hockey League and 4 games for the New York Islanders and also played on the 1988 United States Olympic ice hockey team before retiring.

== Personal life ==
Okerlund is the son of "Mean" Gene Okerlund, a longtime pro wrestling announcer for the AWA, WWF (now WWE) and WCW.

Okerlund ran the professional wrestling media company Classic Wrestling from 2000 to 2018, packaging vintage wrestling footage into shows that aired on both pay per view and online streaming services.

As of 2012, Okerlund lived in the Minneapolis–Saint Paul, Minnesota area and worked in advertising.

== Career statistics ==
=== Regular season and playoffs ===
			Regular season					Playoffs
Season	Team	League	GP	G	A	Pts	PIM	GP	G	A	Pts	PIM
1981–82	Burnsville High School	HS-MN	25	12	20	32	8	—	—	—	—	—
1982–83	Burnsville High School	HS-MN	—	24	37	61	—	—	—	—	—	—
1983–84	University of Minnesota	WCHA	34	11	20	31	18	—	—	—	—	—
1984–85	University of Minnesota	WCHA	47	16	27	43	80	—	—	—	—	—
1985–86	University of Minnesota	WCHA	48	17	32	49	58	—	—	—	—	—
1986–87	University of Minnesota	WCHA	4	0	7	7	0	—	—	—	—	—
1987–88	United States National Team	Intl	40	9	16	25	34	—	—	—	—	—
1987–88	New York Islanders	NHL	4	0	0	0	2	—	—	—	—	—
1987–88	Springfield Indians	AHL	13	2	1	3	9	—	—	—	—	—
NHL totals			4	0	0	0	2	—	—	—	—	—

=== International ===
Year	Team	Event	GP	G	A	Pts	PIM
1984	United States	WJC	7	2	3	5	4
1988	United States	OLY	3	1	0	1	4
Junior totals			7	2	3	5	4
Senior totals			3	1	0	1	4
