= WCW World Heavyweight Championship =

Former men's professional wrestling championship

- The Big Gold Belt represented the WCW World Heavyweight Championship in 1991 and then from 1994 to 2001

Details
- Promotion: National Wrestling Alliance; World Championship Wrestling (January 11, 1991 – March 23, 2001); World Wrestling Federation (March 23, 2001 – December 9, 2001)
- Date established: January 11, 1991
- Date retired: December 9, 2001 (unified with the WWF Championship and became Undisputed WWF Championship)

Other names
- WCW World Heavyweight Championship (January 11, 1991 – March 26, 2001); WCW Championship (June 24, 2001 – November 19, 2001); World Championship (November 19, 2001 – December 9, 2001); WCW World Championship (official name listed on WWE's website); Undisputed WWF Championship (December 9, 2001)
Statistics
- First champion: Ric Flair
- Final champion: Chris Jericho
- Most reigns: Ric Flair (8 reigns)
- Longest reign: Hulk Hogan (1st reign, 469 days)
- Shortest reign: Chris Jericho (2nd reign, 24 minutes)
- Oldest champion: Ric Flair (51 years, 94 days)
- Youngest champion: The Giant (23 years, 263 days)
- Heaviest champion: The Giant (500 lb)
- Lightest champion: David Arquette (150 lb)

The WCW World Heavyweight Championship was a men's professional wrestling world heavyweight championship originally used in World Championship Wrestling (WCW) and later, the World Wrestling Federation (WWF, now WWE). Established on January 11, 1991, it was the original world title of WCW, spun off from the NWA World Heavyweight Championship after WCW seceded from the National Wrestling Alliance (NWA). It existed in WCW from 1991 to 2001, and was the most prestigious and prized title in the promotion during the time period.

Following the acquisition of WCW by the WWF in March 2001, it became one of two world titles in the WWF, and was the second world championship utilized by the company, after their original title, the WWF Championship. Upon its acquisition, its name was immediately abbreviated to the WCW Championship and finally, the World Championship in November. It continued to complement the WWF Championship until the following month, when both titles were unified to create the Undisputed WWF Championship on December 9, 2001, at Vengeance; the undisputed title followed the lineage of the WWF Championship while the WCW title was immediately retired.

Ric Flair was the first holder of the WCW World Heavyweight Championship, with Chris Jericho being the last. The title was the second to be represented by the historic Big Gold Belt, first introduced in 1986.

== History ==
=== Formation ===
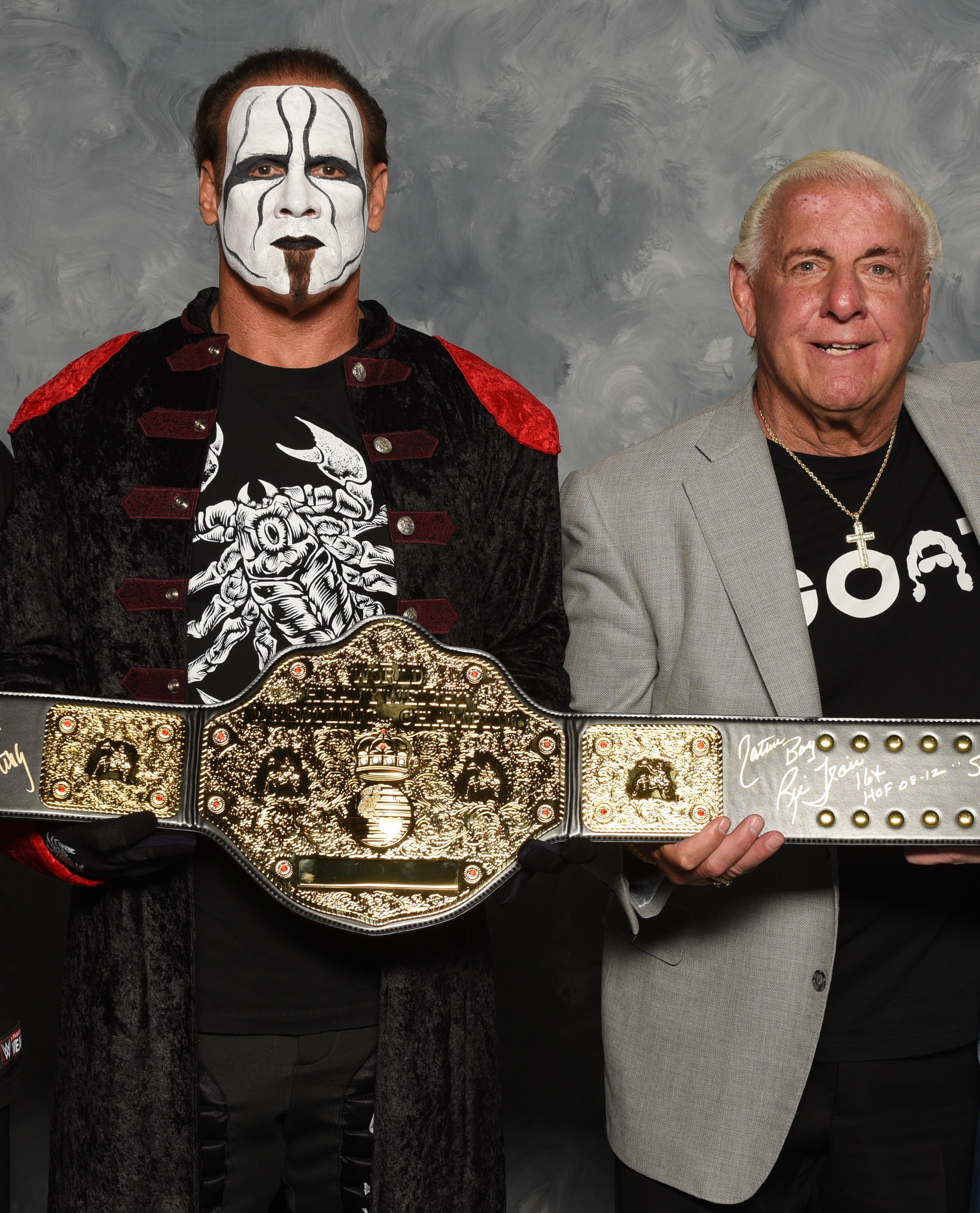
Sting (left) and Ric Flair (right) holding a replica of the Big Gold Belt which represented both the WCW World Heavyweight championship and NWA World Championship at different points

In November 1988, Turner Broadcasting purchased Jim Crockett Promotions, which had promoted under the name "NWA World Championship Wrestling". While the promotion remained a member of the National Wrestling Alliance (NWA), the use of the NWA name was gradually reduced on televised programming, in favor of the name "World Championship Wrestling", or "WCW". On January 11, 1991, Ric Flair defeated Sting to win the NWA World Heavyweight Championship and was recognized as the WCW World Heavyweight Champion. The new championship was not initially represented by its own title belt, and WCW continued to use the NWA World Heavyweight Championship title belt. Because of this, WCW regularly claimed the NWA World Heavyweight Championship lineage for its own championship.

=== Separate championship ===
On July 1, 1991, creative disagreements and a contractual dispute between Ric Flair and WCW Executive Vice President Jim Herd led to Flair's WCW contract being terminated, the WCW World title being vacated, and Flair subsequently signing with Vince McMahon's World Wrestling Federation. When Herd refused to return Flair's $25,000 deposit (all prior NWA World champions paid a deposit that would be returned when the wrestler dropped it to the next champion), Flair kept the "Big Gold Belt" that had represented the NWA/WCW World Heavyweight Championship and wore it on WWF television. A new WCW World Heavyweight title belt was ordered, but was not ready in time for The Great American Bash on July 14. WCW was forced to use a belt owned by Dusty Rhodes from the defunct Professional Wrestling Federation in Florida with a gold-colored plate tacked on with the words "WCW World Heavyweight Champion", which was awarded to Lex Luger after he defeated Barry Windham in a cage match for the vacant championship. The new belt appeared shortly after the event. WCW and its parent company, Turner Broadcasting System, filed a lawsuit against the WWF for using WCW's intellectual property on WWF programming; Flair and the WWF argued that since Flair was not paid back his deposit, Flair owned the belt and had every right to display the championship on WWF television if he and the WWF chose. The lawsuit would eventually be settled and by 1992, Flair had stopped using the "Big Gold Belt" on WWF television. In 1992, the Big Gold Belt was used for the revived NWA World Heavyweight Championship, a co-promotional gimmick between WCW and New Japan Pro-Wrestling. Masahiro Chono won the G1 Climax in 1992 defeating Rick Rude. Then in 1993 On January 4, The Great Muta won the NWA World Heavyweight title defeating Masahiro Chono, but eventually dropped it to Barry Windham at SuperBrawl III. Then at the "WCW Disney tapings", it was revealed that WCW had been changing titles around without the NWA agreeing on it, making it a breach of contract. In September 1993, WCW left the NWA for good over a dispute regarding the other NWA members demanding that NWA world champion be available for booking, and due to the use of the NWA World Heavyweight Championship on syndicated programming recorded months in advance. By fall 1993, Rick Rude was appearing at the "Disney tapings" as the NWA World Heavyweight Champion, despite the fact that in regards to the storyline, Flair, who had returned to WCW and regained the NWA title, was still champion. After leaving the NWA, WCW kept the Big Gold Belt, and it was renamed the WCW International World Heavyweight Championship.

=== Unification ===
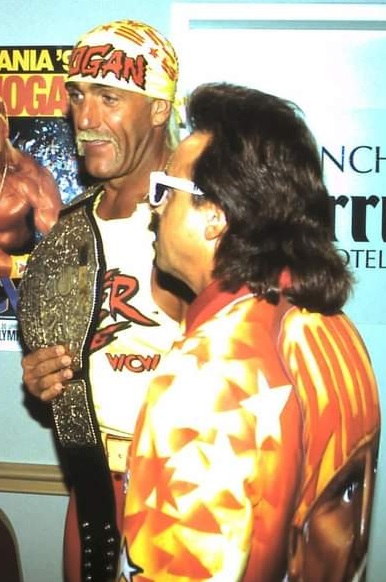
Six-time champion Hulk Hogan shown here holding the title in 1994.

At Starrcade in December 1993, Flair won the WCW World Heavyweight Championship, by defeating Vader. WCW decided to unify the WCW World Heavyweight Championship (represented by the new belt) and International Championship (represented by the "Big Gold Belt"), by having Flair wrestle Sting in June 1994. Flair won and unified the WCW World Heavyweight Championship with the WCW International World Heavyweight Championship. The unified championship retained the lineage of the WCW World Heavyweight Championship, while the International Championship was retired. The belt design used from mid-1991 to mid-1994 to represent the WCW World Heavyweight Championship was dropped in favor of keeping the "Big Gold Belt", which had originally represented the title when it was established in January 1991.

During Hollywood Hogan's runs as champion in 1996–1997 and again in 1998–1999 (ie from his second to his fifth reign as champion), as part of the New World Order (nWo) storyline, the title was spray painted each time with the "nWo" initials in black and often announced during Hogan's title defenses as the nWo/WCW World Heavyweight Championship, while referred to by nWo members only as the nWo World Heavyweight Championship. Similarly, red paint was used for the nWo Wolfpack.

=== WCW's final years (1999–2001) ===
During Vince Russo's run as the head writer, which lasted from October 3, 1999 until October 2000, the turnover rate of the title increased dramatically. In 2000, the championship changed hands 25 times and was vacated six times. In comparison, in 1998 the title changed hands only five times and was vacated once. No reign lasted longer than 76 days; five reigns lasted for 24 hours or less, and further six reigns lasted no more than eight days. (Note: as recognized by the WWE) A total of 11 people held the title at some point in 2000. Among them were actor David Arquette and Russo himself; neither was an actual wrestler at time. Following Russo's departure, Scott Steiner won the belt at Mayhem and remained champion until the final episode of Monday Nitro when he dropped it to Booker T in a winner-takes-all match. (Note: Booker T's WCW United States Heavyweight Championship was also on the line)

=== Acquisition by the WWF ===
A diagram showing the evolution of various world heavyweight championships.

In March 2001, the World Wrestling Federation (WWF, now WWE) purchased the assets of WCW. Soon after, "The Invasion" took place and four of WCW's championships were defended on WWF programming including the WCW World Heavyweight Championship, which became known as the "WCW Championship". The WWF also utilized the WCW United States Heavyweight Championship, WCW Cruiserweight Championship, and the WCW Tag Team Championship.

After the "Invasion" concluded at Survivor Series in 2001, the title was rebranded as the "World Championship", making The Rock the last person to hold the title while it was named as the WCW Championship. The title was then unified with the WWF Championship at Vengeance, where Chris Jericho defeated The Rock and Stone Cold Steve Austin to win the World Championship and the WWF Championship, respectively. As a result, Jericho was the last holder of the championship title, and he became the first Undisputed WWF Champion. The Big Gold belt itself would be used in tandem with the WWF Championship belt to represent the WWF Championship until a single belt was presented to then champion Triple H by Ric Flair in April 2002.

== Reigns ==
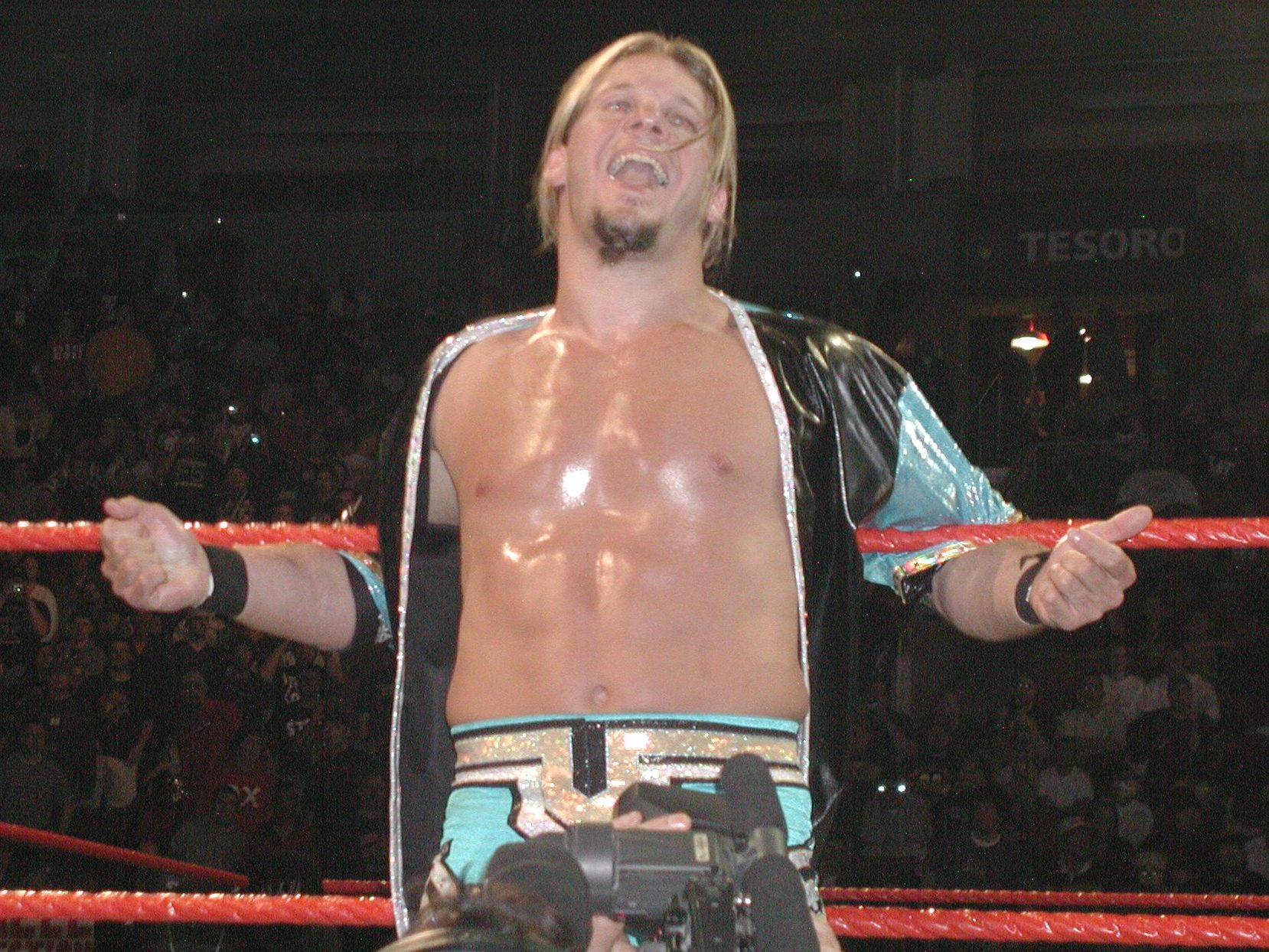
Chris Jericho, seen in 2003, was the final WCW World Heavyweight Champion under the WWF umbrella when he unified with Stone Cold Steve Austin's WWF Championship at Vengeance in 2001.

The inaugural champion was Ric Flair, and there were 63 different champions overall. The longest reigning champion was Hulk Hogan during his first reign who held the title from July 17, 1994, to October 29, 1995, for a total of 469 days. Hogan holds the record for longest combined reigns at 1,177 days. Ric Flair has the shortest title reign, having won it and lost it on the same night on May 29, 2000. The Giant was the youngest champion, at the age of 23. The oldest champion was Ric Flair who won at the age of 51. Flair held the title the most times with eight championship reigns, though only six have been recognized by WWE. There were twelve vacancies throughout the title's history.

Chris Jericho was the final champion in his second reign. He defeated Stone Cold Steve Austin at Vengeance in San Diego, California on December 9, 2001 to unify the WWF and World Championships; thus becoming the first Undisputed WWF Champion. Jericho would lose the undisputed title to Triple H at WrestleMania X8 and the Big Gold Belt continued to appear until the April 1, 2002 episode of Raw when the big gold belt and the "Big Eagle"/"Attitude Era" WWF championship belt used from 1998 to 2002 was replaced by the "Undisputed Championship Belt".

== See also ==
- World championships in WWE

== Notes ==
Sporting positions
Preceded by NWA World Heavyweight Championship	WCW's top world championship 1991–2001	Succeeded by World Heavyweight Championship
