= Gene Okerlund =

American wrestling interviewer and announcer (1942–2019)

"Mean Gene" Okerlund
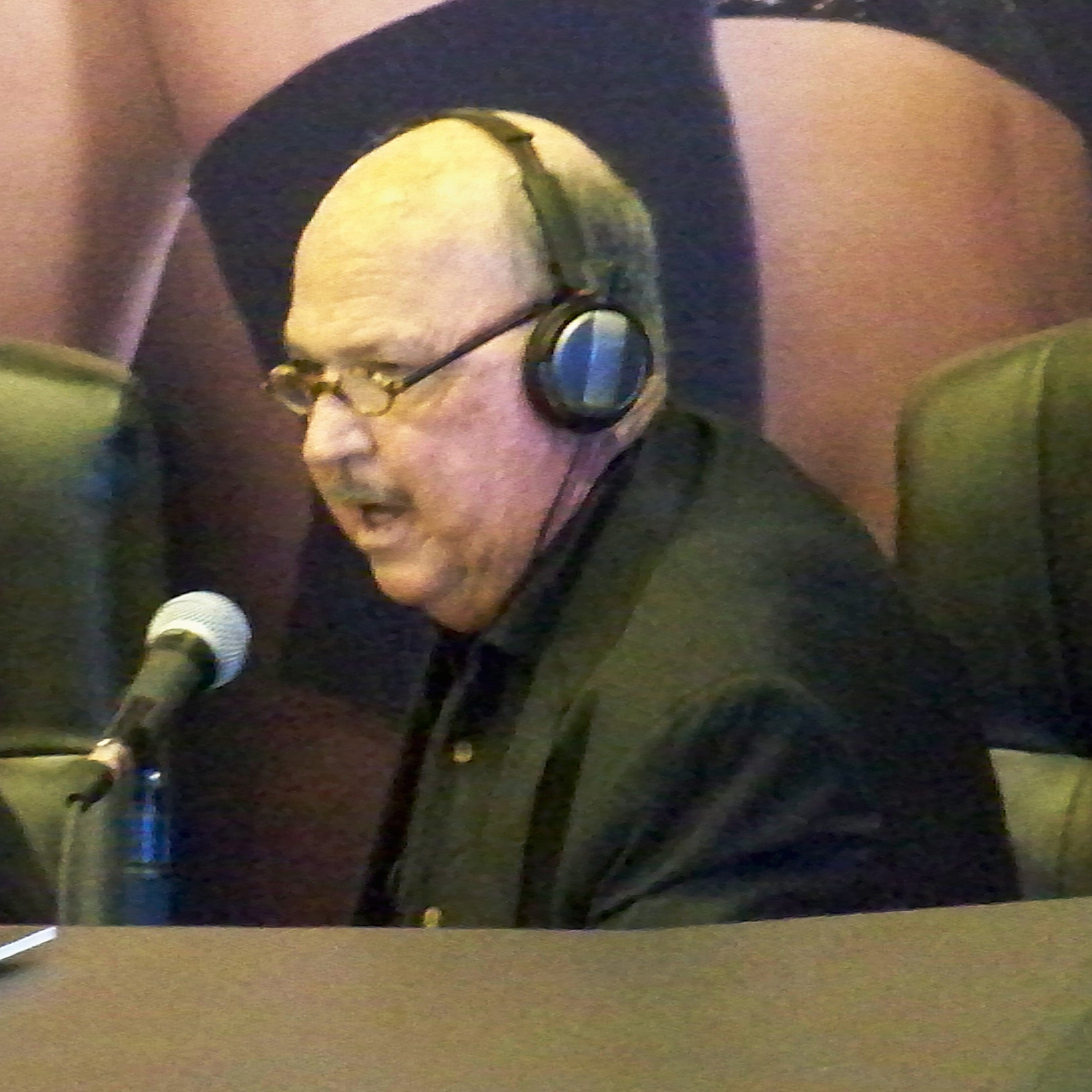
- Okerlund in 2009

Personal information
- Born: Eugene Arthur Okerlund; December 19, 1942 Brookings, South Dakota, U.S.
- Died: January 2, 2019 (aged 76) Sarasota, Florida, U.S.
- Education: University of Nebraska
- Spouse: Jeanne Okerlund (m. 1964)
- Children: 2; including Todd Okerlund

Professional wrestling career
- Ring name: Gene Okerlund
- Billed height: 5 ft 9 in (1.75 m)
- Billed weight: 212 lb (96 kg)
- Billed from: Robbinsdale, Minnesota
- Debut: 1970
- Retired: 2018

Eugene Arthur Okerlund (December 19, 1942 – January 2, 2019) was an American professional wrestling interviewer, announcer and television host. He was best known for his work in the World Wrestling Federation (WWF, now WWE) and World Championship Wrestling (WCW). Okerlund was inducted into the WWE Hall of Fame in 2006 by Hulk Hogan. He was signed to a lifetime contract with WWE and later worked for promotional programs. He has been described by some journalists as the greatest interviewer in the history of professional wrestling.

== Early life; radio career ==
Eugene Arthur Okerlund was born on December 19, 1942, in Brookings, South Dakota to Arthur and Helen Okerlund. He grew up in Sisseton and was raised on an Indian reservation. He graduated from Sisseton High School in 1960. He was an all-around athlete, participating in basketball, baseball, football and track.

After studying broadcast journalism at the University of Nebraska, Okerlund landed a job as a disc jockey at KOIL, a radio station in Omaha, Nebraska. During the late 1960s, Okerlund frequently relocated across the country for various disc jockey positions in radio markets such as Flint, Michigan and Winston-Salem, North Carolina. By 1967, Okerlund settled in Minneapolis, Minnesota where he worked for WDGY as a radio host under the alias of "Gene Leader". He later left that position to become Program Director at KDWB.

Okerlund also worked in Golden Valley, Minnesota for WTCN-TV, a local television station, where he sold advertising in the station's sales department. Later, Okerlund became a business partner in a Minneapolis-based advertising firm, Cohen Okerlund Smith Advertising.

Okerlund played with the Harold Johnson Orchestra and fronted the band Gene Carroll and the Shades. The band released "Is It Ever Gonna Happen" on the album In This Corner, on Norton Records in 1962.

== Professional wrestling career ==
=== American Wrestling Association (1970–1983) ===
In 1970, Okerlund left the radio industry for a position at the American Wrestling Association (AWA), where he occasionally filled in for ailing ring announcer and interviewer Marty O'Neill, eventually becoming O'Neill's permanent replacement by the end of the decade. While there, Jesse "The Body" Ventura gave him the moniker "Mean Gene". According to Ventura, "In an interview, I laughingly called him 'the Mean Gene Hot Air Machine,' and the 'Mean Gene' stuck, I'm proud that I gave him a nickname that will stick with him forever." His first interview was with Nick Bockwinkel and Bobby Heenan, acting terrified when both were jumped from behind.

Okerlund stayed with the AWA until the end of 1983, when he was one of many AWA personnel to join the expanding World Wrestling Federation (WWF).

=== World Wrestling Federation (1984–1993) ===
Okerlund debuted in the World Wrestling Federation in 1984. He stayed with the WWF for nine years as their top interviewer and was a host of such WWF shows as All-American Wrestling. He sang the national anthem at the inaugural WrestleMania and "Tutti Frutti" on The Wrestling Album. Okerlund's interviews were memorable, most notably those involving Hulk Hogan, who began his interviews with "Well, you know, Mean Gene …". He also notably teamed up with Hogan to face the duo of George Steele and Mr. Fuji in a winning effort. At SummerSlam 1989, during an interview with Intercontinental Champion Rick Rude, a sign in the background suddenly fell down, causing an outburst by Okerlund. At Survivor Series 1990, Okerlund hosted the hatching of the Gobbledy Gooker (played by Héctor Guerrero). As fans in attendance started to boo, a rock and roll rendition of "Turkey in the Straw" began to play and Okerlund and the Gooker danced in the ring.

Okerlund appeared at SummerSlam 1993 and made his final WWF appearance of the 1990s on the September 18, 1993, edition of Superstars. He then left the WWF entirely when his contract expired. He stated in an RF Video shoot interview, that although he probably could have re-negotiated a new contract, he was never actually offered one, thus opting to become an interviewer for World Championship Wrestling (WCW). He claimed at the time of his hiring with WCW that he had not been on speaking terms with McMahon for the past few years he was working in the WWF.

=== World Championship Wrestling (1993–2001) ===
Okerlund debuted in World Championship Wrestling (WCW) on the November 6, 1993, edition of WCW Saturday Night. He was mostly used in a mentor role mostly plugging the WCW Hotline in which he would talk about wrestling news from WCW, WWF and independent organizations from all over the world. After Fall Brawl '96: War Games, Okerlund's contract expired and decided to take a leave of absence from television, although it was rumored that he was going back to the WWF or left in protest over Hulk Hogan's heel turn and joining the NWO. While he was away, Tony Schiavone, Mike Tenay and Lee Marshall replaced him by doing the interviews and plugging the WCW Hotline.

In early November 1996, Okerlund signed a new deal with WCW after fans were requesting him to come back and returned on the Veterans Day edition of WCW Monday Nitro after Schiavone welcomed him back.

Okerlund wrestled twice in WCW; the first was in mid-2000 when he and Buff Bagwell faced Chris Kanyon and fellow announcer Mark Madden, with Bagwell and Okerlund winning. However, Madden wanted Okerlund back in the ring the next week in a one on one match-up. The two did wrestle again and Okerlund won the match with the assistance of Pamela Paulshock. After that, he was with WCW until March 2001 when the company was purchased by the WWF.

=== Late career (2001–2018) ===
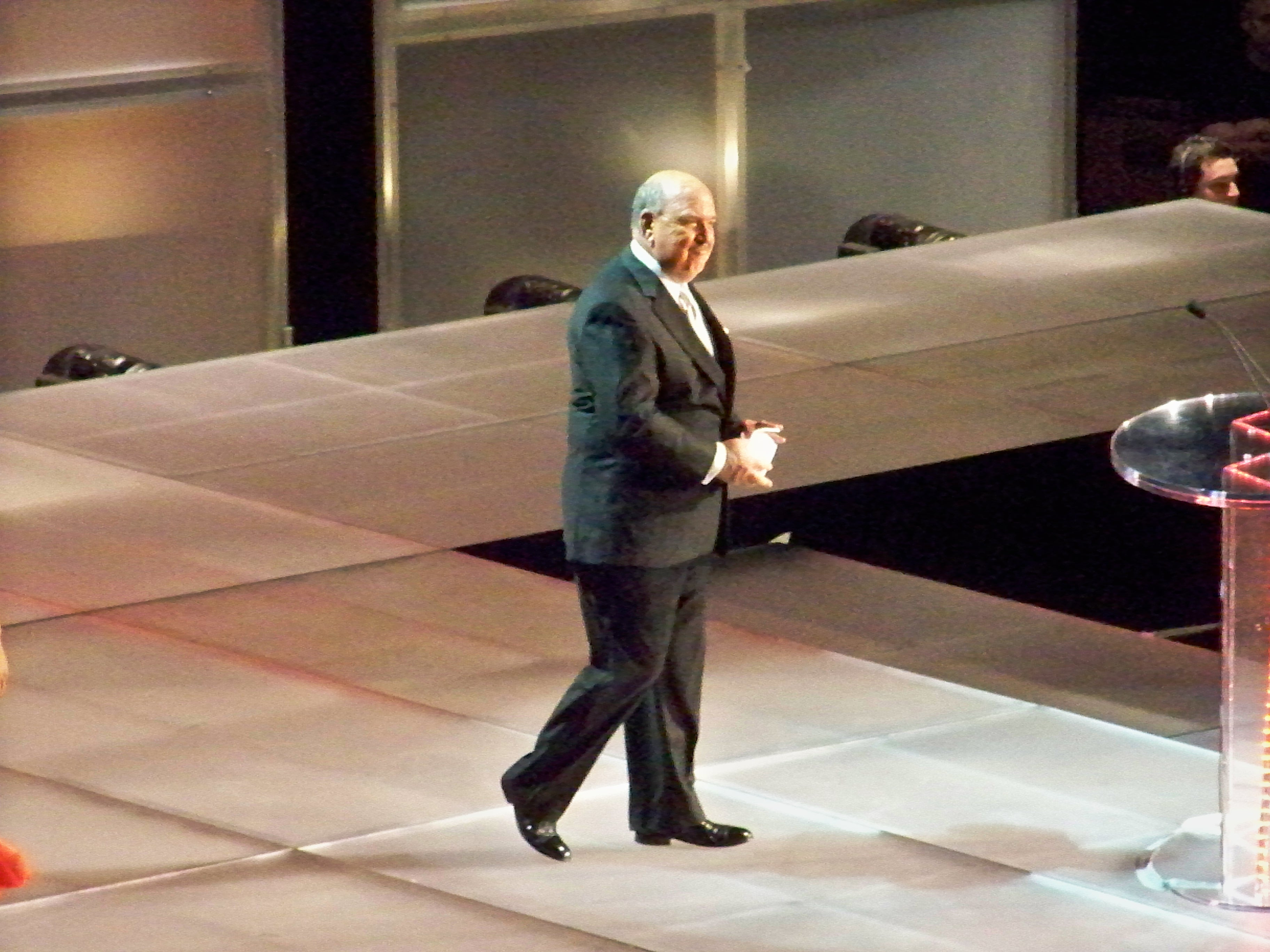
Okerlund at the 2009 WWE Hall of Fame

Shortly before WWF's purchase of WCW in 2001, Okerlund rejoined his old promotion (renamed WWE in 2002). His first assignment back with the WWF was the Gimmick Battle Royal during WrestleMania X-Seven on April 1, 2001, along with Bobby "The Brain" Heenan. He hosted WWE Confidential in 2002, which lasted for two years. Okerlund would also host WWE Madison Square Garden Classics, a weekly series, airing on the MSG Network, featuring classic WWE matches that took place at Madison Square Garden from the last four decades and the WWE Classics On Demand Hall of Fame section, which takes a look at a different WWE Hall of Famer each month.

Okerlund was inducted into the WWE Hall of Fame on April 1, 2006, by Hulk Hogan. In June 2008, Okerlund began hosting WWE Vintage Collection, a program which showcases archive footage from the extensive WWE video library.

Okerlund conducted the interviews on the three-hour "Old School" episode of Raw on November 15, 2010, where he interviewed John Cena, Randy Orton, members of The Nexus and Mae Young in similar fashion as to how interviews were done in the 1980s. In November 2016, Okerlund became the narrator for the WWE Network original animated series WWE Story Time, keeping that spot until his death with Jerry Lawler taking over the voiceover work for the show.

On January 22, 2018, at WWE Raw 25 Years, Okerlund made his final WWE appearance where he interviewed the then WWE Champion, AJ Styles.

== Other media ==
On November 12, 1985, Okerlund, along with Hulk Hogan, Bobby Heenan, Ricky Steamboat, Davey Boy Smith, Corporal Kirchner, Dynamite Kid and Big John Studd, appeared on The A-Team. That same year, Okerlund even interviewed Liberace (one of the highest paid entertainers at the time) at his penthouse at Trump Tower.

He appeared as himself, along with Jesse Ventura in the 1989 action movie No Holds Barred, as well as in the comedy films Repossessed in 1990, as the commentators for the exorcism, and Ready to Rumble in 2000.

Okerlund appears in WCW's video games WCW Nitro, WCW/nWo Thunder and WCW Mayhem.

Okerlund lent his voice to the 2000 snowboarding game SSX as the announcer for the in-game level "Merqury City Meltdown".

Okerlund was one of the professional wrestling legends on the WWE Network's show Legends' House.

Okerlund appeared as a "Celebrity Prognosticator" on ESPN Radio's The Dan Le Batard Show with Stugotz on November 27, 2013.

In 2018, Okerlund appeared in a Mountain Dew Kickstart commercial featuring Kevin Hart who during the commercial semi-impersonated Randy Savage.

He made an appearance at the WrestleCade 2018 weekend event that took place November 23–25, 2018 in Winston-Salem, North Carolina.

== Personal life ==
While in high school in Sisseton, South Dakota, he formed a band, "Gene Carroll & The Shades," recording a single in 1959, "Red Devil / Do You Remember" (M&L 1001). As "Gene Carroll," he had a second single in 1962, "Is It Ever Gonna Happen / Holly" (Wausau C-1100). The band played parties throughout the Midwest and the Dakotas, and in 2009 were inducted into the South Dakota Rock and Roll Music Association's Hall of Fame.

In contrast to his nickname "Mean Gene", Okerlund throughout the years was considered the friendliest person in the game by many wrestlers and promotion staff. Okerlund was close friends with Hulk Hogan, The Iron Sheik and Bobby Heenan.

Okerlund had been married to his wife Jeanne since March 27, 1964, and had two sons, Todd and Tor, along with three grandsons. Todd starred on the University of Minnesota ice hockey team from 1983 to 1987, and played on the 1988 United States Olympics team that competed in Calgary, playing four games with the NHL's New York Islanders.

In 2004, Okerlund had a kidney transplant. In his later years, Okerlund suffered from polycystic kidney disease. He also enjoyed boating, golfing, and spending time at his cabin in Big Sandy Lake during the summer.

== Death ==
Okerlund died on the morning of January 2, 2019, at the age of 76 in a Sarasota, Florida hospital. It was revealed by his son, Todd Okerlund, that he had received three kidney transplants and had suffered a fall which caused his health to deteriorate in the weeks leading up to his death. Later that day, condolences were sent by some fellow WWE superstars and wrestling alumni on various social media sites, including: Ric Flair, Hulk Hogan, Iron Sheik (who often referred to him as "Gene Mean"), Stone Cold Steve Austin and Dwayne "The Rock" Johnson, among many others.

== Awards and accomplishments ==
- Nebraska Pro Wrestling Hall of Fame
- Class of 2019
- New England Pro Wrestling Hall of Fame
  - Class of 2005
- Professional Wrestling Hall of Fame
  - Class of 2016
- World Wrestling Federation/Entertainment
  - WWE Hall of Fame (Class of 2006)
  - Slammy Award (2 times)
    - Best Commentator (1986)
    - Best Head (1987) with Bam Bam Bigelow
- Wrestling Observer Newsletter
  - Most Disgusting Promotional Tactic (1995) 900 hotline advertisements promo
  - Wrestling Observer Newsletter Hall of Fame (Class of 2016)
