= Starrcade (2000) =

2000 World Championship Wrestling pay-per-view event

- Promotion: World Championship Wrestling
- Date: December 17, 2000
- City: Washington, D.C.
- Venue: MCI Center
- Attendance: 6,596
- Buy rate: 50,000
- Tagline: Unedited! Unpredictable! Unreal!

Pay-per-view chronology
← Previous; Mayhem	Next → Sin

Starrcade chronology
← Previous; 1999	Next → 2017

The 2000 Starrcade was the 18th annual Starrcade professional wrestling pay-per-view (PPV) event produced by World Championship Wrestling (WCW). It took place on December 17, 2000, at the MCI Center in Washington, D.C. This was the final Starrcade event produced by WCW, as it was purchased by the World Wrestling Federation (WWF) in March 2001. Another Starrcade event would not be produced for another seventeen years, when WWE used the name for a special live event in 2017.

The main event was between Scott Steiner and Sid Vicious for the WCW World Heavyweight Championship. Shortly after Steiner won the title at Mayhem, the previous pay-per-view event, Vicious was scheduled to face Steiner for the title at Starrcade. Their feud continued after the event until Sin, the following event, when a severe injury forced Vicious to leave professional wrestling. The event also included a tag team match between The Perfect Event and The Insiders for the WCW World Tag Team Championship and a match between Lex Luger and Goldberg.

== Storylines ==
Sid Vicious before his match for the WCW World Heavyweight Championship at Starrcade

The main feud heading into Starrcade was between Scott Steiner and Sid Vicious over the WCW World Heavyweight Championship. Steiner won the title from Booker T at Mayhem, the previous pay-per-view event. The following night on WCW Monday Nitro, Vicious was announced as Steiner's opponent in the title match at Starrcade following Steiner defeating Stevie Ray in a retirement match. Vicious and Steiner brawled on the shows leading up to Starrcade.

Another feud was between the Perfect Event and the Insiders (Diamond Dallas Page and Kevin Nash) over the WCW World Tag Team Championship. The Perfect Event was a part of The Natural Born Thrillers group, and Nash was their mentor. However, on the November 6 edition of Nitro, the Natural Born Thrillers turned on Nash, and Nash teamed with Page to feud with the group. At Mayhem, the Insiders won the title, but were stripped of it on the December 4 edition of Nitro due to a technicality concerning the ending of the match. The Perfect Event was awarded the title, and a rematch was made for Starrcade.

On the October 2 edition of Nitro, Vince Russo made Goldberg begin an undefeated streak. If Goldberg exceeded his previous streak of over 170 matches, he would be awarded a shot at the WCW World Heavyweight Championship. If he failed to do so, he would have to leave WCW. Goldberg continued his streak, and Lex Luger challenged him on the October 30 edition of Nitro, starting their feud. Goldberg defeated Luger in a match at Mayhem. A rematch was made between them at Starrcade, and Luger attacked Goldberg on the following shows with a steel chair. The Sarge, who was credited for training Goldberg, also joined the feud, and aligned with Goldberg. Luger attacked The Sarge several times to taunt Goldberg.

== Event ==
=== Preliminary matches ===
Other on-screen personnel
Role:	Name:
Commentators	Tony Schiavone
Commentators	Scott Hudson
Commentators	Mark Madden
Interviewer	Buff Bagwell
Interviewer	Gene Okerlund
Referees	Scott Armstrong
Referees	Mark Johnson
Referees	Charles Robinson
Referees	Billy Silverman
Ring announcers	Michael Buffer
Ring announcers	David Penzer

The first match was a ladder match between the members of the tag teams 3 Count (Shane Helms and Shannon Moore), The Jung Dragons (Yun Yang and Kaz Hayashi) and the team of Jamie Knoble and Evan Karagias. The match began with them all fighting in their tag teams, and using the ladders. They then fought individually, and performed aerial techniques. A scaffold was constructed with the ladders under the contract suspended above the ring. At the end of the match, the Jung Dragons, Knoble and Karagias were sent off the scaffold, leaving 3 Count. They retrieved the contract at the same time to become the winners of the match.

The second match was between Lance Storm and The Cat. The match started back and forth until Storm gained the advantage with punches and lariats. The Cat fought back, but Elix Skipper, who accompanied Storm, pulled The Cat out of the ring, and attacked him. Storm sent The Cat into the guard rail, and performed a missile dropkick. The Cat fought back briefly until Jim Duggan came down, and hit him. Storm forced The Cat to submit with the Canadian Maple Leaf, and won the match. After the match, Skipper and Storm beat down Duggan until The Cat fought them off.

The third match was between Crowbar and Terry Funk for the WCW Hardcore Championship. The match started when Funk ambushed Crowbar backstage. They fought inside a truck, and Funk sent Crowbar through a table with a hip toss. Crowbar attacked Funk with a car door, and slammed a door into Funk's head. Funk performed a low blow, and slammed the door into Crowbar's head repeatedly. Funk handcuffed Crowbar, and attacked him with the car door and a steel chair. Crowbar fought back with the chair, and performed a slingshot splash to Funk through a table. Funk fought back with chair shots, and pinned Crowbar after a piledriver on the car door to win the match and the title.

The fourth match was between KroniK (Brian Adams and Bryan Clark) and the team of Big Vito and Reno. Big Vito and Reno had the early advantage, and double-teamed Clark. Clark fought back with a senton off the apron to Big Vito. KroniK dominated Big Vito until Clark and Big Vito collided, and both were knocked down. Adams and Reno tagged in, and Reno turned on Big Vito by performing a Roll of the Dice on him. The match ended in a no-contest.

The fifth match was an Ambulance match between Bam Bam Bigelow and Mike Awesome. The match started back and forth with both using the guard rail and a steel chair. They sent each other into the side of the ambulance, and Bigelow punched through a window after missing Awesome. Bigelow attacked with a chair, and performed a DDT. Awesome sent Bigelow into the ringsteps, and Bigelow sent Awesome through a table with a back body drop. They fought on the hood of the ambulance, and Awesome attacked Bigelow with the safety lights. Bigelow fell through the roof into the ambulance, and Awesome won the match.

The sixth match was between Shane Douglas and General Rection for the WCW United States Heavyweight Championship. The match started back and forth. Rection sent Douglas into the guard rail and ringpost, but then missed a moonsault. Douglas missed a punch with a chain he hid in his tights, and Rection performed a belly to back suplex, causing Douglas to drop the chain. Chavo Guerrero Jr. came out, distracted the referee, and threw Douglas the chain. As Douglas was about to use the chain, Guerrero notified the referee of the chain, and Douglas was disqualified. Rection won the match, and Douglas beat down Rection and Guerrero.

The seventh match was a Bunkhouse Street Fight between The Filthy Animals (Konnan, Rey Mysterio and Billy Kidman) (accompanied by Tygress) and the team of Jeff Jarrett and the Harris Brothers. All men fought, and the Filthy Animals had the early advantage with the use of the weapons. This ended when Mysterio was thrown into a dumpster. The match was changed to requiring the teams to tag, and Jarrett and the Harris Brothers had the advantage. They dominated Kidman, and the Harris Brothers performed an H-Bomb on Konnan and Mysterio. Kidman fought back, and had the advantage over Jarrett until the Harris Brothers attacked Kidman with a liquor bottle. Jarrett then pinned Kidman after a Stroke.

The eighth match was between the Insiders (Diamond Dallas Page and Kevin Nash) and the Perfect Event (Chuck Palumbo and Shawn Stasiak) for the WCW World Tag Team Championship. Nash and Page had the early advantage until Palumbo performed a superkick to Page, and gained the advantage over him. Page fought back, and tagged in Nash. Nash attacked both Palumbo and Stasiak until Stasiak hit him with the title belt. Stasiak went after Page outside the ring, but Page performed a Diamond Cutter. Mark Jindrak and Sean O'Haire attempted to interfere, but Page fought them off. Nash performed a big boot to Palumbo, and pinned him after a Jackknife Powerbomb to win the match and the title.

The ninth match was between Lex Luger and Goldberg. Goldberg dominated Luger from the start of the match. As Goldberg attacked Luger outside, Luger pushed Goldberg's shoulder into the ringpost. They went back and forth as Buff Bagwell and The Sarge came down to be in Goldberg's corner. Luger hit Goldberg with brass knuckles, and Bagwell performed a Buff Blockbuster to Goldberg, seemingly by accident. Luger attempted to apply the Torture Rack, but Goldberg blocked it. Bagwell attacked Bruce outside as Goldberg pinned Luger after a spear and a Jackhammer to win the match. After the match, Bagwell attacked Goldberg with a steel chair, and revealed his alliance with Luger.

=== Main event match ===
Scott Steiner after retaining the WCW World Heavyweight Championship at Starrcade

The main event was between Sid Vicious and Scott Steiner for the WCW World Heavyweight Championship. The match started back and forth until they went outside the ring, and Midajah, who accompanied Steiner, attacked Vicious with a lead pipe. Steiner attacked Vicious with a steel chair, and gained the advantage, applying the Steiner Recliner. Vicious fought back after Midajah accidentally performed a diving crossbody to Steiner. Vicious performed a chokeslam, and applied the cobra clutch. Midajah distracted Vicious, and allowed Steiner to attack him with the lead pipe. Jarrett came out, and accidentally hit Steiner with his guitar. Steiner fought back with a low blow and a T-Bone suplex. Steiner made Vicious pass out with the Steiner Recliner to win the match, and retain the title.

== Aftermath ==
The feud between Scott Steiner and Sid Vicious continued after the event. The following night, Ric Flair, the on-screen president of WCW, announced that Steiner would defend the WCW World Heavyweight Championship in a Three Way match at Sin. Jeff Jarrett won a four-man tournament to become one of the challengers in the match as Flair kept the identity of the other challenger a mystery. As Jarrett and Steiner planned to work together in the match, Flair added Vicious to the match. Road Warrior Animal was revealed to be the mystery challenger, and Steiner retained the title. The feud, however, came to an end immediately after Sin as Sid suffered a severe compound fracture of his left leg during the match after performing a move off the middle rope; the injury led to his retirement from full-time competition and he did not wrestle again for three years. Steiner was placed into feuds with Diamond Dallas Page and Kevin Nash over the next two months, defeating Nash at SuperBrawl Revenge and Page at Greed before WCW was purchased by the World Wrestling Federation (WWF). He lost his title to Booker T on the last edition of WCW Monday Nitro held eight days after his match with Page.

Since the WWF purchased WCW in March 2001, the 2000 edition of Starrcade went down as the final edition. By 2000, WCW had fallen from its peak and had largely become an afterthought, having lost $62 million in 2000 alone. WCW was put up for sale, and was purchased by the WWF on March 23. Not all of its wrestlers' contracts were purchased in the deal, however, and Steiner's was one of those that were not (hence Booker T defeated him). Soon after, the WWF began the "Invasion" storyline, where WCW became a group of wrestlers led by Shane McMahon with the intention of taking over the WWF. Steiner did eventually join what is now WWE in 2002, and many other WCW stars would eventually become part of the company like Nash, Scott Hall, Hulk Hogan, and Goldberg. Most, however, did not stay; Nash left the company in 2003 after an injury-filled campaign, with Steiner leaving in early 2004 after failing to sustain his WCW success and Goldberg only spending one largely uneventful year in WWE despite winning the World Heavyweight Championship (until his return to WWE in 2016). Hall was fired shortly after signing with the company due to an incident involving public drunkenness on an airplane, and Hogan made sporadic appearances after 2003 before departing altogether in 2009 for Total Nonstop Action Wrestling (TNA). While not all of the former WCW stars enjoyed success, some did; Page was a tag team champion and European Champion while with the company while Booker T eventually won the WWE Triple Crown and the King of the Ring tournament. Hogan would also win the Undisputed WWF Championship shortly following his return to the company in 2002.

== Reception ==
In 2007, Arnold Furious of 411Mania gave the event a rating of 6.0 [Average], stating:

I'm actually quite shocked. It's not so much that this is a good show but just the fact that it isn't a bad show that’s so impressive. Considering the cavalcade of crap that [led] into Starrcade it was almost certainly going to be a disaster. Of course all the booking is horrible but at least some of the wrestlers were caring again at this point.

The event had a buyrate of 0.11 equivalent to 50,000 buys.

== Results ==
No.	Results	Stipulations	Times
1	3 Count (Shane Helms and Shannon Moore) defeated The Jung Dragons (Kaz Hayashi and Yun Yang) (with Leia Meow) and Evan Karagias and Jamie Knoble	Ladder match to determine the #1 contender for the WCW Cruiserweight Championship	13:49
2	Lance Storm (with Elix Skipper and Major Gunns) defeated Ernest Miller (with Ms. Jones) by submission	Singles match	07:25
3	Terry Funk defeated Crowbar (c) (with Daffney) by pinfall	Hardcore match for the WCW Hardcore Championship	10:21
4	Big Vito and Reno (with Marie) vs. KroniK (Brian Adams and Bryan Clark) ended in a no contest	Tag team match	08:18
5	Mike Awesome defeated Bam Bam Bigelow	Ambulance match	07:56
6	Gen. Rection (c) defeated Shane Douglas by disqualification	Singles match for the WCW United States Heavyweight Championship	09:46
7	The Harris Brothers (Don Harris and Ron Harris) and Jeff Jarrett defeated The Filthy Animals (Billy Kidman, Konnan and Rey Mysterio Jr.) (with Tygress)	Six-man tag team Bunkhouse Brawl	12:31
8	The Insiders (Diamond Dallas Page and Kevin Nash) defeated The Perfect Event (Chuck Palumbo and Shawn Stasiak) (c) by pinfall	Tag team match for the WCW World Tag Team Championship	12:04
9	Goldberg defeated Lex Luger by pinfall	No Holds Barred match Had Goldberg lost, he would have been forced to leave WCW.	07:17
10	Scott Steiner (c) (with Midajah) defeated Sid Vicious by technical submission	Singles match for the WCW World Heavyweight Championship	10:12
(c) / – the champion(s) heading into the match
