= Halloween Havoc (2000) =

World Championship Wrestling pay-per-view event

- Promotional poster featuring Sting
- Promotion: World Championship Wrestling
- Date: October 29, 2000
- City: Paradise, Nevada
- Venue: MGM Grand Garden Arena
- Attendance: 7,582
- Buy rate: 70,000
- Tagline: The future of professional wrestling is here and now...

Pay-per-view chronology
← Previous; Fall Brawl	Next → Millennium Final

Halloween Havoc chronology
← Previous; 1999	Next → 2020

The 2000 Halloween Havoc was a professional wrestling pay-per-view (PPV) event produced by World Championship Wrestling (WCW). It was the 12th annual Halloween Havoc and took place on October 29, 2000, from the MGM Grand Garden Arena in Paradise, Nevada.

This was the last Halloween Havoc produced by WCW, as in March 2001, the World Wrestling Federation (WWF, now WWE) acquired WCW; the WWF was then renamed to WWE the following year. In 2020, 19 years after the acquisition of WCW, WWE revived Halloween Havoc as an annual event for their developmental territory, NXT.

== Production ==
=== Background ===
Halloween Havoc was an annual professional wrestling pay-per-view event produced by World Championship Wrestling (WCW) since 1989. As the name implies, it was a Halloween-themed show held in October. The 2000 event was the 12th event in the Halloween Havoc chronology and it took place on October 29, 2000, from the MGM Grand Garden Arena in the Las Vegas, Nevada for the fifth consecutive year.

=== Storylines ===
The event featured professional wrestling matches that involved different wrestlers from pre-existing scripted feuds and storylines. The professional wrestlers portrayed heroes, villains, or less distinguishable characters in scripted events to build tension and culminate in a wrestling match or series of matches. Storylines were produced on WCW's weekly television shows, Monday Nitro and Thunder.

== Event ==
Other on-screen personnel
Role:	Name:
Commentators	Tony Schiavone
Commentators	Mark Madden
Commentators	Stevie Ray
Interviewers	Gene Okerlund
Interviewers	Pamela Paulshock
Referees	Scott Armstrong
Referees	Mickie Jay
Referees	Mark Johnson
Referees	Charles Robinson
Referees	Billy Silverman
Ring announcers	Michael Buffer
Ring announcers	David Penzer

The opening match of the show was a three-way dance for the WCW World Tag Team Championship. This match saw the champions The Natural Born Thrillers (Mark Jindrak and Sean O'Haire) defeated The Filthy Animals (Billy Kidman and Rey Misterio Jr.) (with Konnan) and The Boogie Knights (Disqo and Alex Wright). Mysterio hit the springboard legdrop on Inferno, which enabled O’Haire to hit a Swanton on Inferno and pick up the pinfall victory.

The second match was for the WCW Hardcore Championship. This match saw Reno defeat Sgt. AWOL to retain the title. Reno hit the Roll of the Dice onto the announce table to pick up the victory. Following the match, Reno continued his assault. As the fighting moved to the backstage area, The Misfits In Action (Lt. Loco and Cpl. Cajun) and The Perfect Event (Shawn Stasiak and Chuck Palumbo) both got involved. This led to an impromptu match that saw The Misfits In Action defeat The Perfect Event after Loco hit a Tornado DDT on Palumbo.

The next match was scheduled to be a mixed tag-team match between The Filthy Animals (Konnan and Tygress) and Shane Douglas and Torrie Wilson. Torrie dressed as Wonder Woman for the match. Before the match, Douglas came out and challenged Tygress to come out alone due to the shape Konnan would be in following his match earlier in the evening. Although she first did come out alone, Konnan eventually came out and hit a double facebuster on Douglas to pick up the victory.

The following match was a First Blood DNA match between David Flair and Buff Bagwell. Flair, on his way to the ring, brought a DNA testing kit with him which he left on the announcer's table. Bagwell picked up the victory after hitting a Buff Blockbuster followed by a chair shot on Flair. After the match, Lex Luger made his surprise return after 5 months away. Luger appeared to be coming out to help Bagwell, however he then turned his back on him by pushing him into the ring post, causing him to bleed from the mouth. Flair grabbed his DNA kit and used it to collect blood from Bagwell.

The next match saw the WCW Cruiserweight Champion Mike Sanders face off against WCW Commissioner Ernest Miller in a non-title kickboxing match. Following the second round, Shane Douglas appeared at ringside which led to Miller fighting with him. While the two fought on the outside of the ring, Miller lost the match via countout. Sanders thus became the new commissioner of WCW.

Prior to the next match, Vampiro came to the ring and challenged Mike Awesome to put his WCW World Heavyweight Championship title match the next night on Nitro on the line during the match. Their match became a "falls count anywhere" match, despite the stipulation never being announced. Awesome picked up the victory following a powerbomb to Vampiro to retain his title shot the next night.

During the next match, Lance Storm defended his WCW United States Heavyweight Championship in a handicap match, which saw him team with Jim Duggan to take on Gen. Rection. Major Gunns, who came to the ring with Storm, distracted Storm while Rection hit the No Laughing Matter on Duggan to pick up the victory and the title, while reuniting with his former manager Gunns, as she gained her freedom from Team Canada.

In the next match Jeff Jarrett defeated Sting. While Sting made his way to the ring, a man dressed as Sting from early in his career attacked him, however Sting was able to hit the Scorpion Death Drop on him. Following this, another Sting dressed in his early 1990s look attacked him, followed by one dressed the way he did as part of the nWo Wolfpac. Toward the end of the match, while Sting had Jarrett in the Scorpion Deathlock, a Crow-era Sting came through the ring mat and pulled Sting back under with him. After Sting was able to escape, he went for the Scorpion Death Drop on Jarrett, however before he could the lights went out and another Crow Sting came from the rafters, who the real Sting hit a Scorpion Death Drop on through the announce table. Following this, another fake Sting broke a guitar over Sting's head, followed by Jarrett breaking one over Sting's head, enabling Jarrett to pick up the pinfall victory.

The second-to-last match of the evening was for the WCW World Heavyweight Championship. The champion Booker T retained his title against Scott Steiner, after Steiner was disqualified for attacking Booker T with a lead pipe.

The final match of the evening was a no disqualification handicap elimination match between Goldberg and KroniK (Brian Adams and Bryan Clark), under the stipulation that if Goldberg lost, he would be forced to leave WCW for good. Adams came to the ring and claimed that Goldberg had not been cleared to wrestle and that the match would not take place. However, footage was then shown of Goldberg backstage receiving confirmation that he was cleared to wrestle against KroniK. Goldberg first eliminated Clark following a spear through a table which was propped upward in the corner of the ring. Goldberg then eliminated Adams after hitting a spear and a jackhammer to pick up the victory.

== Reception ==
In 2016, Kevin Pantoja of 411Mania gave the event a rating of 1.5 [Extremely Horrendous], stating, "Oh my goodness. WCW 2000 again brings me one of the worst Pay-Per-Views of all time. Seriously, this is abysmal. It’s like WCW was purposely putting on the worst possible shows. Think about this. The first two matches combined for five and a half stars. The next nine managed two and a half and I might have been generous. Never watch this show. It is absolutely dire."

The event was voted by the Wrestling Observer Newsletter as the worst major wrestling show of 2000.

== Aftermath ==
Booker T continued to feud with Scott Steiner during the entire month of November, and successfully defended the WCW World Heavyweight Championship against Steiner at Millennium Final. Steiner defeated Booker T to win the championship in a straitjacket steel cage match at Mayhem, and would remain champion until the final episode of WCW Monday Nitro on March 26, 2001, when he lost the championship to Booker T (who held the United States Heavyweight Championship) in a winner-take-all match.

The 2000 Halloween Havoc was the final Halloween Havoc event produced by WCW, as in March 2001, WCW was acquired by the World Wrestling Federation (WWF); the WWF was renamed to WWE in 2002. After 19 years since WWE's acquisition of WCW, the company revived the event in 2020 for their developmental brand, NXT, to be held as a television special episode of NXT. It has since been held as an annual event for NXT.

== Results ==
No.	Results	Stipulations	Times
1	The Natural Born Thrillers (Mark Jindrak and Sean O'Haire) (c) defeated The Filthy Animals (Billy Kidman and Rey Misterio, Jr.) (with Konnan) and The Boogie Knights (Disqo and Alex Wright) by pinfall	Three-Way Dance for the WCW World Tag Team Championship	10:04
2	Reno (c) defeated Sgt. AWOL by pinfall	Hardcore match for the WCW Hardcore Championship	10:55
3	The Misfits In Action (Lt. Loco and Cpl. Cajun) defeated The Perfect Event (Shawn Stasiak and Chuck Palumbo) by pinfall	Tag team match	09:21
4	The Filthy Animals (Konnan and Tygress) defeated Shane Douglas and Torrie Wilson by pinfall	Intergender tag team match	08:38
5	Buff Bagwell defeated David Flair	First Blood DNA match	05:40
6	Mike Sanders (with Shawn Stasiak and Chuck Palumbo) defeated Ernest Miller (with Ms. Jones) by countout	Kickboxing match	08:32
7	Mike Awesome defeated Vampiro by pinfall	Singles match	09:50
8	Gen. Rection defeated Lance Storm (c) and Jim Duggan (with Major Gunns) by pinfall	Handicap match for the WCW United States Heavyweight Championship	10:07
9	Jeff Jarrett defeated Sting by pinfall	Singles match	14:30
10	Booker T (c) defeated Scott Steiner (with Midajah) by disqualification	Singles match for the WCW World Heavyweight Championship	13:00
11	Goldberg defeated KroniK (Brian Adams and Bryan Clark)	Handicap Elimination match Had Goldberg lost, he would have been forced to leave WCW.	03:43
(c) / – the champion(s) heading into the match
