= Fall Brawl (2000) =

2000 World Championship Wrestling pay-per-view event

- VHS cover featuring Goldberg and Scott Steiner.
- Promotion: World Championship Wrestling
- Date: September 17, 2000
- City: Buffalo, New York
- Venue: HSBC Arena
- Attendance: 8,638
- Buy rate: 75,000
- Tagline: Unedited. Unpredictable. Unbelievable.

Pay-per-view chronology
← Previous; New Blood Rising	Next → Halloween Havoc

Fall Brawl chronology
← Previous; 1999	Next → Final

The 2000 Fall Brawl was the eighth and final Fall Brawl professional wrestling pay-per-view (PPV) event produced by World Championship Wrestling (WCW). The event took place on September 17, 2000 from the HSBC Arena in Buffalo, New York. It would be the final Fall Brawl event before the company folded and was purchased by rival promotion World Wrestling Federation (WWF; now WWE) in March 2001.

== Storylines ==
The event featured wrestlers from pre-existing scripted feuds and storylines. Wrestlers portrayed villains, heroes, or less distinguishable characters in the scripted events that built tension and culminated in a wrestling match or series of matches.

== Event ==
Other on-screen personnel
Role:	Name:
Commentators	Tony Schiavone
Commentators	Scott Hudson
Commentators	Mark Madden
Interviewers	Gene Okerlund
Interviewers	Pamela Paulshock
Referees	Mickie Jay
Referees	Mark Johnson
Referees	Charles Robinson
Referees	Billy Silverman
Ring announcers	Michael Buffer
Ring announcers	David Penzer

The main event was a Caged Heat match, in which Kevin Nash defended the title against Booker T. Booker defeated Nash to win the title. Notable matches on the undercard were Scott Steiner versus Goldberg in a no disqualification match, Mike Awesome versus Jeff Jarrett in a Bunkhouse Brawl and Sting versus The Great Muta and Vampiro in a Triangle match and a ten-person elimination match between Filthy Animals and Natural Born Thrillers, which was stopped when Animals' teammate Paul Orndorff was injured during the match. The next night on Nitro, the elimination match was resumed with the remaining competitors, Rey Misterio, Jr. and Tygress of The Filthy Animals and Mike Sanders, Chuck Palumbo, Sean O'Haire, Mark Jindrak and Shawn Stasiak of The Natural Born Thrillers in which the Filthy Animals won by pinfall after Tygress hit a facebuster on Mike Sanders.

== Reception ==
In 2019, Thomas Hall of Wrestling Rumors gave the event a rating of C−, stating, "Overall, this is the best pay per view they’ve done in a long time because they’re getting closer to having a balance between the insanity and an actual show. The show is still far from actually good, but at least they’re not making me spend an hour going on about how horrible the show was or how it broke the rules of wrestling. Somehow, that’s a major step forward for them, which is really sad to think about."

== Results ==
No.	Results	Stipulations	Times
1	Elix Skipper (c) (with Major Gunns) defeated Kwee Wee (with Paisley)	Singles match for the WCW Cruiserweight Championship	11:03
2	The Misfits In Action (Cpl. Cajun, Lt. Loco and Sgt. AWOL) defeated 3 Count (Shannon Moore, Evan Karagias, and Shane Helms)	Six-man tag team match	10:25
3	The Harris Brothers (Ron Harris and Don Harris) defeated KroniK (Brian Adams and Bryan Clark)	First Blood Chain match	06:37
4	Lance Storm (c) (with Major Gunns) defeated Gen. Rection	Singles match for the WCW United States Heavyweight Championship with Jim Duggan as special guest enforcer	06:46
5	The Filthy Animals (Disqo, Rey Misterio Jr., Juventud Guerrera, Konnan, and Tygress), Big Vito and Paul Orndorff vs. The Natural Born Thrillers (Mark Jindrak, Sean O'Haire, Mike Sanders, Chuck Palumbo, Shawn Stasiak, Reno and Johnny the Bull) ended in a no contest	Elimination match	16:34
6	Shane Douglas and Torrie Wilson defeated Billy Kidman and Madusa	Scaffold match	05:01
7	Sting defeated The Great Muta and Vampiro (with Violent J and Shaggy 2 Dope)	Three-way match	05:12
8	Mike Awesome defeated Jeff Jarrett	Bunkhouse Brawl	09:04
9	Scott Steiner defeated Goldberg by technical submission	No Disqualification match	13:50
10	Booker T defeated Kevin Nash (c)	Caged Heat match for the WCW World Heavyweight Championship	09:02
(c) / – the champion(s) heading into the match

=== Filthy Animals vs. Natural Born Thrillers eliminations ===
Elimination no.	Wrestler	Team	Eliminated by	Elimination move	Time
1	Konnan	Filthy Animals	Sean O'Haire	Chartbuster by Disqo	06:00
2	Disqo	Filthy Animals	Reno	Snake Eyes	06:53
3	Big Vito	Filthy Animals	Reno	Snake Eyes	08:43
4	Reno	Natural Born Thrillers	Rey Misterio, Jr.	Diving leg drop low blow with Guerrera	10:45
5	Juventud Guerrera	Filthy Animals	Sean O'Haire	Seanton Bomb	12:08
6	Johnny the Bull	Natural Born Thrillers	Paul Orndorff	Spike piledriver	13:28
7	Paul Orndorff	Filthy Animals	Sean O'Haire	Pinned after Orndorff suffered a stinger while piledriving Jindrak	16:34
8	Rey Mysterio, Jr., Tygress	Filthy Animals and Natural Born Thrillers	N/A	The match was cancelled due to Orndorff's injury	N/A
8	Mike Sanders, Chuck Palumbo, Sean O'Haire, Mark Jindrak, Shawn Stasiak	Filthy Animals and Natural Born Thrillers	N/A	The match was cancelled due to Orndorff's injury	N/A
Survivor:	None				

== Aftermath ==
Scott Steiner's high-profile win over Goldberg at Fall Brawl catapulted him into main event status and he became a top contender for the WCW World Heavyweight Championship. Steiner faced the champion Booker T for the title at the following month's pay-per-view Halloween Havoc, where he lost by disqualification.
