= Mayhem (2000) =

2000 World Championship Wrestling pay-per-view event

- Promotional poster featuring Midajah and Scott Steiner
- Promotion: World Championship Wrestling
- Date: November 26, 2000
- City: Milwaukee, Wisconsin
- Venue: U.S. Cellular Arena
- Attendance: 3,800
- Buy rate: 55,000
- Tagline: The Genetic Freak Of Sports Entertainment UNLEASHED

Pay-per-view chronology
← Previous; Millennium Final	Next → Starrcade

Mayhem chronology
← Previous; 1999	Next → Final

The 2000 Mayhem was the second and final Mayhem professional wrestling pay-per-view (PPV) event produced by World Championship Wrestling (WCW). The event took place on November 26, 2000 from the U.S. Cellular Arena in Milwaukee, Wisconsin.

== Storylines ==
The event featured wrestlers from pre-existing scripted feuds and storylines. Wrestlers portrayed villains, heroes, or less distinguishable characters in the scripted events that built tension and culminated in a wrestling match or series of matches.

== Event ==
Other on-screen personnel
Role:	Name:
Commentators	Tony Schiavone
Commentators	Mark Madden
Commentators	Stevie Ray
Interviewers	Gene Okerlund
Interviewers	Pamela Paulshock
Referees	Scott Armstrong
Referees	Mickie Jay
Referees	Mark Johnson
Referees	Charles Robinson
Referees	Billy Silverman
Referees	Jamie Tucker
Ring announcers	Michael Buffer
Ring announcers	David Penzer

Twelve matches were contested at the event. The main event was a straitjacket Caged Heat match between Booker T and Scott Steiner for the WCW World Heavyweight Championship. Steiner won the title by knocking Booker T out with a Steiner Recliner after hitting him with a steel chair. Other prominent match on the card was Goldberg versus Lex Luger, with the stipulation that Goldberg would be forced to leave WCW if he lost. The event featured many title matches including a WCW World Tag Team Championship match, in which Perfect Event defended the titles against The Insiders in a rivalry stemming from the New Blood versus Millionaire's Club angle from earlier in the year.

== Reception ==
In 2015, Kevin Pantoja of 411Mania gave the event a rating of 2.5 [Very Bad], stating, "I’ve seen worse from WCW around this time but not by much. Nothing on the entire card cracked three stars, with the three way tag match and WCW World Title being the best. The Tag Titles aren’t bad, but they aren’t really good either. Too many people just seemed to not care and it hurt the quality of most of the matches. You can kind of tell that this was a company ready to close their doors soon."

== Results ==
No.	Results	Stipulations	Times
1	Mike Sanders (c) defeated Kwee Wee (with Paisley)	Singles match for the WCW Cruiserweight Championship	07:50
2	3 Count (Shane Helms and Shannon Moore) defeated Evan Karagias and Jamie Knoble, and The Jung Dragons (Kaz Hayashi and Yun Yang) (with Leia Meow)	Triple threat tag team match	10:53
3	Mancow (with Al Roker Jr., Freak, Jim Jesus and Turd, the Bartender) defeated Jimmy Hart	Singles match	01:38
4	Crowbar (c) defeated Big Vito and Reno	Hardcore match for the WCW Hardcore Championship	07:50
5	The Filthy Animals (Billy Kidman and Rey Misterio Jr.) (with Tygress) defeated KroniK (Brian Adams and Bryan Clark) and Alex Wright (with Disqo)	Handicap match	07:46
6	Ernest Miller (with Ms. Jones) defeated Shane Douglas (with Torrie Wilson)	Singles match	08:00
7	Bam Bam Bigelow defeated Sgt. A.W.O.L.	Singles match	05:41
8	Gen. Rection defeated Lance Storm (c) (with Major Gunns)	Singles match for the WCW United States Heavyweight Championship	06:25
9	Jeff Jarrett defeated Buff Bagwell	Singles match	11:10
10	The Insiders (Diamond Dallas Page and Kevin Nash) defeated The Perfect Event (Chuck Palumbo and Shawn Stasiak) (c)	Tag team match for the WCW World Tag Team Championship	14:55
11	Goldberg defeated Lex Luger	Singles match Had Goldberg lost, he would have been forced to leave WCW.	05:53
12	Scott Steiner (with Midajah) defeated Booker T (c) by technical submission	Straitjacket Caged Heat match for the WCW World Heavyweight Championship	13:10
(c) / – the champion(s) heading into the match
