= Starrcade (1999) =

1999 World Championship Wrestling pay-per-view event

- Promotional poster featuring Goldberg and several other wrestlers
- Promotion: World Championship Wrestling
- Date: December 19, 1999
- City: Washington, D.C.
- Venue: MCI Center
- Attendance: 8,582
- Buy rate: 145,000
- Tagline: The Battle to End the Millennium.

Pay-per-view chronology
← Previous; Mayhem	Next → Souled Out

Starrcade chronology
← Previous; 1998	Next → 2000

The 1999 Starrcade was the 17th annual Starrcade professional wrestling pay-per-view (PPV) event produced by World Championship Wrestling (WCW). It took place on December 19, 1999, from the MCI Center in Washington, D.C.

The main event was between Bret Hart and Goldberg for the WCW World Heavyweight Championship. The match was notable for a concussion Hart sustained, which ultimately led to his retirement in 2000. After Hart won the title at the Mayhem event, Goldberg challenged Hart to a match for the title. The match ended in a screwjob, with Goldberg losing unfairly. Soon after the event, Hart formed and led a new incarnation of the New World Order group. Other matches included a ladder match between Chris Benoit and Jeff Jarrett for the WCW United States Heavyweight Championship, a Powerbomb match between Sid Vicious and Kevin Nash, and Sting against The Total Package. The PPV generated 145,000 buys.

== Storylines ==
The event featured wrestlers from pre-existing scripted feuds and storylines. Wrestlers portrayed villains, heroes, or less distinguishable characters in the scripted events that built tension and culminated in a wrestling match or series of matches.

The main match of Starrcade was between Bret Hart and Goldberg. At Mayhem, the previous pay-per-view event, Hart won a tournament to become the new WCW World Heavyweight Champion. Afterwards, Goldberg challenged Hart to a match at Starrcade for the title. They showed respect for each other, and won the WCW World Tag Team Championship together. They lost the title one week later to The Outsiders.

In September, Eric Bischoff was relieved of his position as the president of WCW. Vince Russo, who previously worked for the World Wrestling Federation, was hired as a writer, and made many changes to the programming. He was portrayed on-screen as "The Powers That Be", a mysterious, unseen power source that controlled the promotion. The programming was changed in style, with more time devoted to non-wrestling segments, and more coherent storylines. Russo received criticism for some of his contributions, and Bischoff described Russo's storylines as dark and unsophisticated.

== Event ==
The first match was between The Mamalukes (Big Vito and Johnny the Bull) and the team of Disco Inferno and Lash LeRoux. The match started with Big Vito and Johnny the Bull dominating LeRoux and Inferno by double-teaming. This continued until Big Vito missed a splash. Inferno and LeRoux fought back until Inferno accidentally performed a Last Dance on LeRoux. Big Vito performed a spinning lifting DDT on LeRoux, and pinned him to win the match.

The second match was between Madusa and Evan Karagias (accompanied by Spice) for the WCW Cruiserweight Championship. The match started back and forth until Karagias performed a hangman and a flying clothesline to the outside. Spice distracted Karagias, and performed a low blow. Madusa then pinned Karagias with a bridging German suplex to win the match and the title.

The third match was between Meng and Norman Smiley for the WCW Hardcore Championship. The match started with Meng dominating Smiley as they fought backstage. Fit Finlay and Brian Knobs then attacked Meng. Finlay hit Meng with a lead pipe, and Smiley pinned him to win the match, and retain the title.

The fourth match was between The Revolution (Shane Douglas, Dean Malenko, Perry Saturn and Asya) and the team of Jim Duggan and The Varsity Club. Saturn and Malenko had the advantage over Duggan for most of the match. This continued until the Varsity Club came in, and fought off The Revolution. However, they then turned on Duggan, and beat him down. They performed a low blow to Duggan, and Douglas pinned him to win the match. As a result of losing, Duggan had to renounce his United States citizenship.

The fifth match was between Vampiro (accompanied by The Misfits) and Steve Williams. The match started back and forth until Williams sent Vampiro off the top turnbuckle. The Misfits came in, and Williams fought them off. Williams continued to attack Vampiro, and the referee disqualified him after Williams refused to stop. Vampiro won the match, and earned a match with Oklahoma, which started immediately after. Oklahoma had the advantage after Williams' attacks. Vampiro fought back with an ura-nage, and beat him down with The Misfits. Vampiro pinned him after a Nail in the Coffin to win the match.

Other on-screen personnel
Role:	Name:
Commentator	Tony Schiavone
Commentator	Bobby Heenan
Commentator	Scott Hudson
Interviewer	Gene Okerlund
Interviewer	Mike Tenay
Referees	Johnny Boone
Referees	Mickie Jay
Referees	Mark Johnson
Referees	Nick Patrick
Referees	Charles Robinson
Referees	Billy Silverman
Ring announcer	Michael Buffer
Ring announcer	David Penzer

The seventh match featured the Creative Control tag team and Curt Hennig against Harlem Heat (Booker T and Stevie Ray) and Midnight. Stevie Ray chose to not wrestle in the match. The match went back and forth until Booker T was attacked outside the ring. Creative Control and Hennig had the advantage. After Creative Control missed a diving elbow drop, Booker T fought back with a Harlem Sidekick and a spinebuster. Hennig came in, and hit Booker T with brass knuckles. Creative Control then pinned Booker T to win the match.

The eighth match was a Bunkhouse Brawl between Dustin Rhodes and Jeff Jarrett. The match started backstage, and went back and forth with the use of a wheelbarrow. They fought to the ring, and Rhodes gained the advantage with the use of a cow bell, and threw powder at Jarrett. Jarrett fought back with a low blow, and applied the sleeper hold. Rhodes fought out with a belly to back suplex, and they fought up the entrance ramp. Curt Hennig attempted to interfere, but Rhodes beat him down. The distraction allowed Jarrett to perform a guitar shot, and pin Rhodes to win the match.

The ninth match was a Crowbar on a Pole match between Diamond Dallas Page and David Flair. Before the match, Flair attacked Page from behind with his own crowbar, and Page was knocked down outside the ring. Page returned, and the match started with Flair having the advantage. Flair performed several attacks, and applied the figure four leglock. Flair retrieved the crowbar, and attempted to use it. Page avoided it, and pinned Flair after a Diamond Cutter to win the match.

The tenth match was between The Total Package and Sting (accompanied by Elizabeth). Prior to the match, Sting was shown handing Elizabeth a can of what he said was spray, and told her to use it if she had to. The Total Package attacked Sting as he entered the ring, and continued to have the advantage. Elizabeth climbed onto the apron, and this allowed Sting to fight back. After they knocked down each other with a clothesline, Elizabeth came into the ring, and revealed her alliance with The Total Package by attempting to use the spray on Sting. Unfortunately for her, it was actually a can of silly string, revealing that Sting anticipated being betrayed by his confidante (a common occurrence in Sting's career). Sting performed a Stinger splash to The Total Package, and attempted to apply the Scorpion Deathlock. Elizabeth hit Sting with a baseball bat, and Sting won the match by disqualification. After the match, The Total Package attacked Sting's right arm with a steel chair and the bat.

The eleventh match was a Powerbomb match between Sid Vicious and Kevin Nash. Vicious gained the advantage after attacking Nash outside the ring with the use of a steel chair and the guard rail. Vicious continued with a leg drop and a scoop slam. Vicious sent Nash into the referee, knocking him down, and performed a powerbomb on Nash. Jeff Jarrett came down, and hit Vicious with a guitar. Nash attempted a powerbomb, but failed due to the pain in his back. The referee revived, and Nash told him he performed a powerbomb on Vicious. The referee believed Nash, and awarded him the victory.

The twelfth match was a ladder match between Chris Benoit and Jeff Jarrett for the WCW United States Heavyweight Championship. Benoit was awarded the title earlier at the event due to his scheduled opponent, Scott Hall, suffered an injury and was unable to compete, and issued an open challenge. The match started back and forth. They sent each other into the ladder, and stopped each other from climbing the ladder by tipping it. As Benoit climbed the ladder, Jarrett sent him down with a missile dropkick to the ladder. Benoit then sent the ladder into Jarrett with a dropkick, and performed a diving headbutt from the top of the ladder. Benoit climbed the ladder, and retrieved the belt to win the match, and retain the title.

The main event was a No Disqualification match between Bret Hart and Goldberg for the WCW World Heavyweight Championship. They knocked down several referees throughout the match. The match started with Goldberg having the advantage after a gorilla press powerslam. Goldberg attacked Hart outside the ring using the guard rail. Back in the ring, Goldberg missed a spear, and hit the turnbuckle. Hart fought back, and applied the ringpost figure four leglock. Hart then targeted the left leg of Goldberg, and applied the figure four leglock. Hart accidentally knocked down the referee, and Goldberg fought back with a mule kick and a spear. With the referee down, Roddy Piper came down to officiate. Hart attacked the leg of Goldberg, and applied the Sharpshooter. Piper ended the match without Goldberg submitting and awarded Hart the victory. Hart retained the title and appeared confused about the situation. The ending resembled the Montreal Screwjob.

== Aftermath ==
Due to the controversial ending to the match between Bret Hart and Goldberg at Starrcade, the WCW World Heavyweight Championship was vacated the following night on WCW Monday Nitro. Hart and Goldberg faced each other later on the show, where Hart regained the title with the help of Scott Hall and Kevin Nash. Hart, Hall, Nash, and Jeff Jarrett formed a new incarnation of the New World Order (nWo) group, named nWo 2000. The mule kick Goldberg performed to Hart during their match at Starrcade gave Hart a severe concussion. Unaware of the severity of the injury, Hart continued to compete in matches in the days following. Hart was diagnosed with post-concussion syndrome, and relinquished the title on January 16, 2000. nWo 2000 disbanded soon after, and was the last incarnation of the nWo in WCW. Later that year, Hart retired from professional wrestling.

In April, Eric Bischoff returned to WCW in a position that involved the managing and overseeing of the creative process. Bischoff worked with Vince Russo, and two new groups were created to feud with each other: the Millionaire's Club, which included older wrestlers, and the New Blood, with younger wrestlers. The value of the WCW World Heavyweight Championship had decreased over the past years, thanks in part to the hotshot booking of Bischoff and Russo, and Bischoff devised a storyline that began at the Bash at the Beach event to restore its value. At Bash at the Beach, according to Bischoff, Russo acted on his own and ruined Bischoff's plan by cutting a worked shoot promo on Hulk Hogan. Russo contends that Bischoff and Hogan were aware of the plan and agreed to it ahead of time. Bischoff left WCW soon after due to problems he had with Russo.

== Reception ==
In 2020, Eric Bischoff called Starrcade 1999 "the absolute worst pay-per-view from opening bell to closing bell that I’ve ever seen in my life."

== Results ==
No.	Results	Stipulations	Times
1	The Mamalukes (Big Vito and Johnny the Bull) (with Tony Marinara) defeated Disco Inferno and Lash LeRoux by pinfall	Tag team match	9:40
2	Madusa defeated Evan Karagias (c) (with Spice) by pinfall	Singles match for the WCW Cruiserweight Championship	3:32
3	Norman Smiley (c) defeated Meng by pinfall	Hardcore match for the WCW Hardcore Championship	4:29
4	The Revolution (Shane Douglas, Dean Malenko, Perry Saturn and Asya) defeated Jim Duggan and The Varsity Club (Kevin Sullivan, Mike Rotunda and Rick Steiner) (with Leia Meow) by pinfall	Eight-person tag team match	4:53
5	Vampiro (with Misfits) defeated Steve Williams by disqualification	Singles match	5:02
6	Vampiro (with Misfits) defeated Oklahoma by pinfall	Singles match	2:52
7	Creative Control (Gerald and Patrick) and Curt Hennig (with Shane) defeated Harlem Heat (Booker T and Stevie Ray) and Midnight by pinfall	Six-man tag team match	7:52
8	Jeff Jarrett defeated Dustin Rhodes by pinfall	Bunkhouse Brawl	11:18
9	Diamond Dallas Page defeated David Flair by pinfall	Crowbar on a Pole match	3:53
10	Sting (with Elizabeth) defeated The Total Package by disqualification	Singles match	5:31
11	Kevin Nash defeated Sid Vicious	Powerbomb match	6:58
12	Chris Benoit (c) defeated Jeff Jarrett	Ladder match for the WCW United States Heavyweight Championship	10:15
13	Bret Hart (c) defeated Goldberg by submission	No Disqualification match for the WCW World Heavyweight Championship	12:07
(c) / – the champion(s) heading into the match
