= Reno (wrestler) =

American professional wrestler (born 1969)

Personal information
- Born: Richard Cornell; January 4, 1969 (age 57) Buffalo, New York, U.S.

Professional wrestling career
- Ring name(s): Reno; Rick Cornell
- Billed height: 6 ft 0 in (1.83 m)
- Billed weight: 240 lb (110 kg)
- Billed from: Las Vegas, Nevada
- Trained by: DeWayne Bruce; Mike Graham; Jody Hamilton; Paul Orndorff; WCW Power Plant
- Debut: 1998
- Retired: 2003

Richard Cornell (born January 4, 1969) is an American retired professional wrestler, better known by the ring name Reno. He is best known for his appearances with World Championship Wrestling from 1999 to 2001, where he held the WCW Hardcore Championship.

== Early life ==
Prior to professional wrestling, Cornell was an amateur wrestler throughout high school before becoming a professional kickboxer.

== Professional wrestling career ==
=== World Championship Wrestling (1999–2001) ===
After completing his training at World Championship Wrestling's Power Plant wrestling school in 1999, Cornell made his WCW television debut On the October 26 edition of WorldWide under his real name in a losing effort to Kid Romeo.

On the August 16 edition of Thunder, Reno helped form The Natural Born Thrillers with Chuck Palumbo, Shawn Stasiak, Sean O'Haire, Mark Jindrak and Mike Sanders by attacking The Filthy Animals. Upon joining the Thrillers, Reno's character was expanded to a shootfighting martial artist who fought in Las Vegas's "underground fighting leagues" complete with a queue ponytail, all of which was based on his legitimate training as a kickboxer.

The Thrillers soon became the new enforcers for Vince Russo and Eric Bischoff by replacing their original enforcers, the Filthy Animals. Soon afterwards, the Thrillers and the Animals began feuding with each other. The tension between the two teams quickly grew as the Thrillers attacked their former trainer, Paul Orndorff, who was subsequently saved by the Animals. At Fall Brawl, the Thrillers and the Animals faced off in an elimination match. The Thrillers eliminated all but two members of the Animals, with the match ending in a no-contest after Orndoff legitimately injured himself after botching his signature piledriver. The following night on Nitro, the Thrillers wrestled against the two survivors from their elimination match, Rey Misterio Jr. and Tygress, but lost.

After this, the Thrillers began chasing the World Tag Team Championship while Reno took a more reserved role. On October 2, 2000, Reno began pursuing the Hardcore Championship, losing to Sgt. AWOL in a tournament final for the belt. Fellow Thriller member Mike Sanders, who was WCW's Commissioner at the time, reversed the decision, however, and gave the win and the title to Reno instead. He then defeated AWOL at Halloween Havoc to retain the title.

On November 8, Reno lost the belt to Crowbar. He soon began a brief feud with both Crowbar and former Hardcore Champion Big Vito, with all three men competing for the title at Mayhem. At the event, Crowbar pinned Reno after hitting him with a chair to retain the title.

Reno then began feuding solely with Vito, which was intensified when it was revealed that Reno was, in storyline, dating Vito's sister, but that was a swerve, it was also revealed that Reno and Vito were, in storyline, brothers. Both men subsequently became allies on the December 4 edition of Nitro when Vito saved Reno from being attacked by KroniK. They formed a tag team soon after, but the team came to an end quickly at Starrcade when Reno turned on Vito during their match with KroniK. He then revealed that he was the one who paid off KroniK to attack him in the previous weeks. Their feud culminated at Sin, which saw Reno pin Vito.

Reno continued his alliance with Mike Sanders and working with the Natural Born Thrillers until the group's dissolution in February 2001, after Johnny The Bull reformed The Mamalukes with Big Vito and members Shawn Stasiak and Mark Jindrak began feuding with Sean O'Haire and Chuck Palumbo over the World Tag Team Title.

Reno wrestled his last match in WCW on the March 14, 2001 edition of Thunder, where he was defeated by former Natural Born Thrillers partner Shawn Stasiak. In late March 2001, the World Wrestling Federation bought out WCW. Cornell's contract was among those acquired in the buyout.

=== World Wrestling Federation and Later Career (2001–2003) ===
Cornell was signed to a developmental deal with the World Wrestling Federation after wrestling a dark match before the August 6 episode of Raw Is War, defeating Mike Sanders despite both being members of The Alliance. From there, he was sent to the Heartland Wrestling Association for more training, where he was a member of Team WCW along with fellow WCW alumni Sanders, Johnny The Bull, Mark Jindrak, Jason Jett, Lash LeRoux, Shannon Moore, Evan Karagias, Kwee Wee, Elix Skipper, and Jamie Knoble before he was released from his developmental contract on December 5, 2001.

Upon being released, Cornell began wrestling for the Australia-based World Wrestling All-Stars under his Reno ring name, where he competed against a number of fellow WCW alumni. He remained with the promotion until its closure in 2003, and subsequently retired from wrestling soon after.

== Championships and accomplishments ==
- World Championship Wrestling
  - WCW Hardcore Championship (1 time)
  - WCW Hardcore Championship Tournament (2001)
