= Marie (wrestling) =

American wrestling manager (1963–2006)

Personal information
- Born: Dina DeStefano

Professional wrestling career
- Ring name: Marie
- Billed height: 5 ft 4 in (1.63 m)
- Trained by: WCW Power Plant
- Debut: 2000
- Retired: 2001

Dina DeStefano is an American retired professional wrestling manager, better known as Marie or Marie Lograsso. She is best known for her run in World Championship Wrestling as the sister of Big Vito.

== Professional wrestling career ==
=== World Championship Wrestling (2000–2001) ===
After completing training at the WCW Power Plant, Marie made her debut on the September 25, 2000 episode of WCW Nitro, as the little sister of Big Vito who watched him at ringside. She usually appeared at ringside for various matches, where the camera would pan to her at different times. It would later be revealed that Marie was dating Reno, who at the time, was a member of The Natural Born Thrillers faction.

As this was revealed, Reno then began feuding solely with Vito, which was intensified when it was revealed that Reno was, in storyline, dating Vito's sister, Marie. It was also revealed that Reno and Vito were, in storyline, brothers. Both men subsequently became allies on the December 4 edition of Nitro when Vito saved Reno from being attacked by KroniK.

With Marie working as their valet, both of the brothers formed a tag team soon after, but the team came to an end quickly at Starrcade when Reno turned on Vito during their match with KroniK. He then revealed that he was the one who paid off KroniK to attack him in the previous weeks. Their feud culminated at Sin, which saw Reno pin Vito. As WCW went out of business and was sold to WWE in 2001, Marie's wrestling career came to an end.

During her run in WCW, many people speculated that she was portrayed by independent wrestler/valet Noel Harlow (Vito's real life wife), but this was false. She confirmed it was false in a Twitter post, and both Reno and Vito didn't know who she was. Harlow's wrestling career didn't start until 2002.

== Personal life ==
Rumours emerged that she died on March 14, 2006, aged 43 from a drug overdose, after a woman of the same name’s obituary was found online, however, this has been questioned by Ryan Byers of 411Mania.com and Brian Damage of Ring the Damn Bell. Her current whereabouts are unknown.
