= Natural Born Thrillers =

Professional wrestling stable

Stable
- Members: Chuck Palumbo; Johnny the Bull; Mark Jindrak; Mike Sanders; Reno; Sean O'Haire; Shawn Stasiak
- Hometown: Mean Streets of Bronx, New York
- Debut: 2000
- Disbanded: August 2001
- Trained by: WCW Power Plant

The Natural Born Thrillers were a professional wrestling stable in World Championship Wrestling from 2000 to 2001. Sean O'Haire and Chuck Palumbo later worked for the World Wrestling Federation in the summer of 2001 as a team. The name is a play on the 1994 film Natural Born Killers.

== History ==
The Natural Born Thrillers were made up of seven young wrestlers, all graduates of the WCW Power Plant. They were trained by Paul Orndorff and WCW management decided to push them immediately.

The Thrillers were Mike Sanders who was the leader of the group, Chuck Palumbo, Sean O'Haire, Shawn Stasiak, Reno, Mark Jindrak and Johnny the Bull. They became the enforcer group for Vince Russo and Eric Bischoff, replacing The Filthy Animals, who they quickly began feuding with. Tension between the two teams quickly grew as the Thrillers attacked their former trainer, Orndorff, and the Animals saved him. At Fall Brawl, the Thrillers and the Animals had an elimination match. After the Thrillers eliminated all but two members of the Animals, the match ended in a no-contest after Orndorff legitimately injured himself attempting a piledriver. The next night on Nitro, the Thrillers faced off against the two survivors, Rey Mysterio Jr. and Tygress, and lost.

The following week, Jindrak and O'Haire won a battle royal to win the WCW World Tag Team Championship. Sanders became the new WCW commissioner by defeating Ernest Miller, and he declared the WCW Hardcore Championship vacant. He set up a tournament to crown the new champion, which was won by Sgt. AWOL. Sanders, however, reversed the decision and the title was awarded to Reno. In October, Jindrak and O'Haire lost the tag titles to Lt. Loco and Cpl. Cajun, but won them back the same night, when Sanders made an immediate rematch.

They were later "coached" by Kevin Nash, who helped Sanders win the WCW Cruiserweight Championship in a Powerbomb match, after he powerbombed Elix Skipper. The Thrillers later turned on Nash, however, and a handicap match with O'Haire, Palumbo, and Stasiak, against Nash went to a no-contest. Jindrak and O'Haire lost the Tag Team Championship to Boogie Knights on the November 20 edition of WCW Monday Nitro, but the following week, Stasiak and Palumbo, as The Perfect Event, won the tag team titles from the Boogie Knights. The Perfect Event feuded with Nash and his new partner, Diamond Dallas Page, who called themselves The Insiders. At Mayhem, The Insiders won the Tag team Championships, but Sanders later stripped them of the titles.

Sanders lost the Cruiserweight Championship to Chavo Guerrero Jr. on the December 6 edition of WCW Thunder. The following week, Sanders set up a handicap match between Guerrero and the Perfect Event, which the Perfect Event won. Sanders also set up a three-way dance between the Insiders, O'Haire and Jindrak, and the Perfect Event, which the Perfect Event won. At Starrcade, the Insiders beat the Perfect Event for the tag team Championships, despite O'Haire and Jindrak's interference.

Sanders then announced a tag team Battle Royal for the number one contendership to the tag team Championships. The final two teams in the battle royal were O'Haire and Jindrak, and the Perfect Event. Sanders declared both teams the winner, and announced that one member from each team would compete for the titles. Palumbo and O'Haire later won them in early January 2001, at Sin. Sanders permanently lost the Commissioner position back to Miller.

By February 2001, the Thrillers had broken up as tensions grew between Stasiak and Jindrak, and Palumbo and O'Haire. Stasiak and Jindrak demanded a tag title shot, and got it at SuperBrawl Revenge, but O'Haire and Palumbo retained. At Greed on March 18, Palumbo and O'Haire pinned Buff Bagwell and Lex Luger in a 54-second squash, and on the final episode of Nitro on March 26, retained the belts over Lance Storm and Mike Awesome to finish as the last tag team champions in WCW history. They moved on to the WWE after it had bought out WCW, while Stasiak and Jindrak moved into singles competition and Johnny the Bull reunited with Big Vito to reform The Mamalukes, but neither Jindrak nor Reno rose to much prominence after the Thrillers.

== Championships and accomplishments ==
- World Championship Wrestling

- WCW World Tag Team Championship (6 times) – Stasiak and Palumbo (3), O'Haire and Jindrak (2), Palumbo and O'Haire (1)
- WCW Cruiserweight Championship (1 time) – Sanders
- WCW Hardcore Championship (1 time) – Reno

== See also ==
- The Mamalukes
- The New Blood
- Perfect Event
