= Perfect Event =

Professional wrestling tag team

The Perfect Event

Tag team
- Members: Shawn Stasiak; Chuck Palumbo
- Billed heights: Stasiak: 6 ft 4 in (1.93 m); Palumbo: 6 ft 7 in (2.01 m)
- Combined billed weight: 522 lb (237 kg)
- Debut: May 2000
- Years active: 2000–2001

The Perfect Event was a tag team in World Championship Wrestling (WCW) and the World Wrestling Federation (WWF) from 2000–2001. The team consisted of Shawn Stasiak and Chuck Palumbo. They are former WCW World Tag Team Champions. Stasiak feuded with Curt Hennig and "stole" his "Perfect" gimmick while Palumbo feuded with Lex Luger and "stole" his "Total Package" gimmick. Although initially solo players, within a month of active duty on the WCW roster, they paired together, their team name being an amalgam of their then-nicknames 'Perfect Shawn' and 'The Main Event', respectively. The team was also part of The Alliance stable months after WCW's closure in 2001.

== History ==
=== World Championship Wrestling ===
==== Formation (2000) ====
Perfect Event formed in late May 2000 feuding with KroniK and defeated them in June 2000 for the WCW Tag Team Titles. Despite being very green in the ring, they were booked over established stars, won titles and enjoyed a constant push by way of Dusty Finishes. They feuded with Tony Marinara, M.I.A., KroniK and The Filthy Animals.

The duo became known for using a Lex Flexer, Lex Luger's own custom dumbbell taken by Palumbo, as an illegal weapon in their matches. The Perfect Event grew a notoriety for hijacking the WCW production truck (similar to the nWo and D-Generation X) and blatantly messing with opponent's entrances.

In August, Stasiak and Palumbo helped form The Natural Born Thrillers with Mike Sanders, Sean O'Haire, Mark Jindrak, and Reno. They were briefly "coached" by Kevin Nash. Johnny the Bull, a tag team partner of Palumbo later on in WWE, would also join the group following the formation.

==== Split and feud (2001) ====
Palumbo and Stasiak won the WCW Tag Team Championship two more times before splitting in early January 2001 when they won a tag team battle royal with Sean O'Haire and Mark Jindrak for a future tag team title shot. After the conclusion of the match Mike Sanders declared both teams victorious and that any combination of the four would face The Insiders (Diamond Dallas Page and Kevin Nash). The Perfect Event split up when Palumbo and Sean O'Haire would be the two chosen members of the Natural Born Thrillers who would face and defeat Page and Nash for the tag titles at Sin on January 14, 2001. Palumbo and O'Haire continued to team together while Stasiak and Mark Jindrak also started teaming together.

Following Palumbo and O'Haire's title victory, the Natural Born Thrillers broke up when the team of Shawn Stasiak and Mark Jindrak would become jealous of Palumbo and O'Haire. The teams would face each other at SuperBrawl Revenge on February 18, 2001, for the tag team titles, which Palumbo and O'Haire retained.

=== World Wrestling Federation ===
Following the acquisition of WCW's intellectual unit by the World Wrestling Federation in 2001, the duo of Palumbo and Stasiak were reunited on July 9, 2001 edition of Raw is War as part of Shane McMahon's The Alliance stable feuding with the WWF wrestlers until Palumbo defected to the WWF near the end of the storyline.

== Championships and accomplishments ==
- World Championship Wrestling
  - WCW World Tag Team Championship (3 times)

== See also ==
- The Natural Born Thrillers
- The New Blood
- The Alliance
