= Evan Karagias =

American professional wrestler and actor (born 1973)

Personal information
- Born: November 27, 1973 (age 52) Gastonia, North Carolina, U.S.
- Education: North Carolina State University

Professional wrestling career
- Ring name(s): Evan Courageous; Evan Karagias
- Billed height: 5 ft 7 in (1.70 m)
- Billed weight: 221 lb (100 kg)
- Billed from: Gastonia, North Carolina
- Trained by: DeWayne Bruce; WCW Power Plant
- Debut: 1997
- Retired: 2010

Evan Karagias (born November 27, 1973) is an American retired professional wrestler and actor.

== Acting career ==
Karagias moved to New York City to pursue an acting and modeling career. He also became the spokesmodel for the 1996 Calvin Klein and US Olympic Committee advertising campaigns. In 1995 he was a recurring guest star on the soap opera All My Children called Jason.

WCW licensed his voice and body scan images to support the Electronic Arts and THQ pro-wrestling videogame series, first appearing in WCW/nWo Thunder and then WCW Mayhem.

Since leaving WWF, Karagias returned to acting and his first acting role for seven years was playing a wrestler on the soap opera Passions. He has made several TV appearances. More recently he has been in several smaller independent films such as Metal Gear, Crazy Eyes and Shotgun Kiss.

== Professional wrestling career ==
=== World Championship Wrestling (1997–2001) ===
Karagias was recruited to join World Championship Wrestling, and entered training at the WCW's "Power Plant" facility in Atlanta, Georgia, where he soon reached stunt instructor status. In 1997 he began his appearances on WCW's weekly wrestling shows as "The Outrageous Karagias" being used as a jobber, and has the dubious distinction of having more defeats to his record as a solo wrestler in WCW as a proportion of all his matches than anyone else. Of almost 50 televised solo matches wrestled with WCW, he won eight. While performing as a jobber, Karagias had a few high points which included his first appearance at a pay-per-view, a battle royal at Slamboree 1998, and several shots at WCW championships such as the WCW Cruiserweight Championship and WCW World Television Championship.

In October 1999, Karagias was seen more and more with female wrestler Madusa. He was allowed to compete in the World Title tournament, but quickly allowed Madusa to pin him after a kiss. After her elimination, Madusa put all her focus on managing Karagias. He then became the number one contender to the Cruiserweight Championship, which was held by Disco Inferno. At Mayhem, Karagias challenged Disco Inferno for the WCW Cruiserweight Championship and won after Inferno was attacked by Creative Control. This was also Karagias's first major championship. Karagias began to have problems with Madusa, since Karagias appeared to have a wandering eye towards the Nitro Girls, specifically Spice. This led to a catfight between the two ladies, with Karagias in the middle. Afterwards, Madusa challenged Karagias to a Cruiserweight Championship match at Starrcade. During the match Spice gave Karagias a low blow allowing Madusa to pin him and become the first female ever to win the WCW World Cruiserweight Championship.

In December 1999, Karagias returned to the ring alongside Shane Helms and Shannon Moore to form 3 Count, the boy band of WCW. They immediately claimed to have a musical hit, coming out before their matches and lip-synching to "Can't Get You Out Of My Heart" while dancing on green circles. Usually, they were interrupted by their opposition. They started out by feuding with The Jung Dragons and would appear in 6-man tag team action frequently.

3 Count soon focused their attention on Norman Smiley, who showed his dislike for their music. Their first pay-per-view match was at Superbrawl 2000, where Smiley, due to his injured ribs, was beaten in a handicap match and 3 Count got the win. The 3 Count team then declared that they were hardcore, leading to numerous fights with the Hardcore Champion, "Nasty Boy" Brian Knobbs. At the end of February 2000, they managed an upset, taking out the champion and getting the WCW Hardcore Championship for themselves. Sharing it as a team, they went into Uncensored 2000 to battle Knobbs once again, this time in a Gauntlet match. After Helms was eliminated, Karagias came out. Without his teammates to aid him, however, Karagias was crushed by Knobbs, who then defeated Moore, getting his Hardcore Championship back.

In late summer, the 3 Count returned to television, singing a new song, "Dance With 3 Count". This earned them the favor of Tank Abbott, who loved listening to them sing, and would attack anyone who tried to stop them. Abbott soon became 3 Count's manager/security guard/back-up dancer, sometimes bringing out a green square for himself to dance on. Abbott & 3 Count soon began a running feud with the trio's old adversaries, the Jung Dragons. Their repeated encounters led to a Ladder match at New Blood Rising, with a recording contract & a gold record hanging from the ceiling. The match was won after interference by Abbott clearing the way for Karagias to climb the ladder and get the contract, winning the match and apparently getting 3 Count a record deal. After the match, Abbott took the contract & the gold record and left. Later on, Abbott announced that he should be the lead singer, with 3 Count as his back-up band. This proved to be too much for 3 Count, who told Abbott that they were through. A minor feud with Abbott soon erupted, which went nowhere because Abbott soon after left WCW.

Karagias became more egotistical, taking over the center circle during 3 Count matches. In November, it all came to a head, when 3 Count was once again wrestling the Jung Dragons. After Karagias took the pinfall away from Helms & Moore, the duo turned on him, taking out their former leader. Karagias soon joined up with Jamie Knoble (formerly known as Jamie-san), who had been unmasked and kicked out of the Jung Dragons by Leia Meow, their manager. They formed a third tag team, intent on battling it out with 3 Count and the Dragons. The three teams' wars with each other soon culminated in a Triangle Tag Team match at Mayhem 2000 which was won by 3 Count. The three groups continued to feud into the next month, when it was announced that there was going to be a three-way ladder match at Starrcade 2000 and once again, Karagias' old partners, 3 Count, won the match.

At Superbrawl Revenge, the three tag teams that had fought so much were brought together once again for a four corners elimination match. 3 Count would once again cost Karagias the match by eliminating him. Later in the match, Moore surprisingly turned on Helms, attacking him and shortly after Karagias turned on Knoble rejoined Moore, returning to 3 Count. Karagias and Moore would remain a tag team for the final months of WCW. They competed in the first WCW Cruiserweight Tag Team Championship tournament, taking out Jason Jett and Scotty O in the first round. They were then bested by the veterans, Rey Mysterio and Billy Kidman, and thus did not appear at WCW Greed, watching instead from the sidelines. They did make an appearance on the final WCW show in March, wrestling for a shot at the Cruiserweight Tag Team Champions, Kid Romeo and Elix Skipper. But they were bested, once again, by Mysterio and Kidman and watched as The Filthy Animals went on to defeat Romeo and Skipper for the belts.

=== World Wrestling Federation (2001) ===
When WCW folded in March 2001 and was purchased by the World Wrestling Federation (which changed its name to World Wrestling Entertainment in 2002), Evan's contract was among the 24 immediately purchased by the WWF as well. He was sent to the WWF's "farm territory", Heartland Wrestling Association. He made his debut for WWF during the Invasion as a member of The Alliance. After a severe concussion in the ring, he was rarely seen and was released in December 2001 after around 8–9 months without ever being used as a wrestler.

=== Independent circuit (2002–2010) ===
On March 22, 2002, Karagias would join AWA Superstars of Wrestling and on that very night challenged the then champion, "The Underwear Model" Eric Priest, to a championship match and won the AWA Superstars of Wrestling World Heavyweight Championship. Karagias would lose the championship to Danny Dominion and two days later regained the title. After holding the championship for over five months he would finally lose the championship to Horshu on October 19. Horshu was then stripped of the title due to missing mandatory title defences and on July 6, 2003, Karagias would defeat Eric Priest to win the vacant championship for a third time. Karagias would hold the title for over one and a half years before being fired in January 2005 by Dale Gagne for misconduct and refusal of defending the title as scheduled.

At the Ultimate Pro Wrestling 5th Anniversary Show on February 20, 2004, Frankie Kazarian defeated Jerry Lynn and Evan Karagias to retain his UPW Lightweight Championship.

Since then, Karagias has been inactive from wrestling. However, on October 28, 2006, Karagias returned to wrestling and appeared at a TNT Pro Wrestling show to face off with X-Pac (who had Scott Hall in his corner) in a charity benefit match.

In 2009 and 2010, he worked for the New York-based Fight The World wrestling promotion, Karagias was the number 1 contender for the FTW heavyweight title and had a match with the champion Balls Mahoney.

== Filmography ==
Film and Television
Year	Film	Role	Notes
1995	All My Children	Jason	Recurring character
2002	Passions	Wrestler	Episode 757
2003	ER	Multiple Characters	
2003	Kingpin	Stunts	
2004	Undercover Kids	Michael	
2004	Live Like a Star	Himself	Episode "Honeymoon They Never Had"
2010	The Cursed	Ed Brasser	Stunt rigger
2010	Sinners and Saints	Lynch	
2010	Shattered Glory	Henry Hitchcock	Unreleased
2010	Shotgun Kiss	Case	Unreleased
2011	Metal Gear	Grey Fox	Fight coordinator
2012	Crazy Eyes	Himself	

== Championships and accomplishments ==
- AWA Superstars of Wrestling
  - AWA Superstars of Wrestling Heavyweight Championship (3 times)
- Heartland Wrestling Association
  - HWA Tag Team Championship (1 time) - with Shannon Moore
- Pro Wrestling Illustrated
  - PWI ranked him #123 of the 500 best singles wrestlers of the PWI 500" in 2000
- World Championship Wrestling
  - WCW Cruiserweight Championship (1 time)
  - WCW Hardcore Championship (1 time)
