= SuperBrawl Revenge =

2001 World Championship Wrestling pay-per-view event

- Promotional poster featuring Sid Vicious, Goldberg, Booker T, Scott Steiner, and Sting.
- Promotion: World Championship Wrestling
- Date: February 18, 2001
- City: Nashville, Tennessee
- Venue: Nashville Municipal Auditorium
- Attendance: 4,395
- Buy rate: 70,000
- Tagline: A Path Of Destruction...A Night Of Vengeance.

Pay-per-view chronology
← Previous; Sin	Next → Greed

SuperBrawl chronology
← Previous; 2000	Next → Final

SuperBrawl Revenge was the eleventh and final SuperBrawl professional wrestling pay-per-view (PPV) event and the penultimate pay-per-view event produced by World Championship Wrestling (WCW). It took place on February 18, 2001, from the Nashville Municipal Auditorium in Nashville, Tennessee.

This was the last SuperBrawl event and the penultimate WCW pay-per-view before the World Wrestling Federation (now WWE) purchased WCW in March 2001. Along with SuperBrawl IV, it was one of only two SuperBrawls never released on home video. The event generated 70,000 ppv buys.

The main event was a two out of three falls count anywhere loser leaves WCW match between Scott Steiner and Kevin Nash for the WCW World Heavyweight Championship. Steiner retained the title, forcing Nash to leave WCW. Featured matches on the undercard were Diamond Dallas Page versus Jeff Jarrett, Ernest Miller versus Lance Storm for the position of WCW Commissioner, title defenses of the World Tag Team, United States Heavyweight and Cruiserweight Championships and matches to determine the #1 contenders for the Cruiserweight and the World Tag Team titles.

== Storylines ==
The professional wrestling matches at SuperBrawl Revenge involved professional wrestlers performing as characters in scripted events pre-determined by the hosting promotion, WCW. Storylines between the characters played out on WCW's television programs, Nitro, Thunder and WorldWide.

The main rivalry heading into the event was between Scott Steiner and Kevin Nash for the WCW World Heavyweight Championship. Steiner retained the title against Road Warrior Animal, Sid Vicious and Jeff Jarrett in a four corners match at Sin. The following night, on Nitro, Steiner cut a promo on injuring Vicious' leg and forcing Goldberg out of WCW. His boasting led to Commissioner Ernest Miller booking a match between Steiner and Kevin Nash later in the night, which ended in a disqualification after the Magnificent Seven attacked Nash. On the January 17 episode of Thunder, the Magnificent Seven interfered in a match between Jarrett and Diamond Dallas Page, prompting Nash, Miller and KroniK to come to the rescue. On the special Tuesday Nitro edition of Nitro on January 23, a match was made between Nash and Buff Bagwell to determine Steiner's opponent for the title at SuperBrawl Revenge. On that same night, Lex Luger defeated Diamond Dallas Page to become the special guest referee for the main event match between Bagwell and Nash. Nash defeated Bagwell to become the #1 contender for the title. On the February 5 episode of Nitro, Nash and Rick Steiner took on Scott Steiner in a handicap match, where Rick turned on Nash, allowing Scott to pick up the win and join the Magnificent Seven. On the February 7 episode of Thunder, The Insiders (Kevin Nash and Diamond Dallas Page) defeated Jeff Jarrett and Rick Steiner.

== Event ==
Other on-screen personnel
Role:	Name:
Commentators	Tony Schiavone
Commentators	Scott Hudson
Referees	Scott Armstrong
Referees	Mark Johnson
Referees	Charles Robinson
Referees	Billy Silverman
Ring announcers	Michael Buffer (Main event)
Ring announcers	David Penzer

=== Pre-Show ===
Before the event aired live on pay-per-view, Chris Harris defeated Kid Romeo in a non-televised match.

=== Preliminary matches ===
The first match at the event was a six-man elimination match to determine the #1 contender for the WCW Cruiserweight Championship for the following month's pay-per-view Greed. The match was originally scheduled to be between Billy Kidman, Shannon Moore, Kaz Hayashi, Yun Yang, Jamie Knoble and Evan Karagias. However, Kidman was attacked by Road Warrior Animal before the match and was replaced by Shane Helms. Karagias was the first to be eliminated when Yang pinned him after a neckbreaker. Shortly after, Knoble eliminated Yang with a jumping reverse piledriver. Moore then eliminated Knoble with a Bottoms Up. Helms followed it up by eliminating Moore with a Nightmare on Helms Street and then pinned Hayashi after a Vertebreaker to win the match and earn the title shot for Greed.

The next match was a singles match between Hugh Morrus and The Wall, stemming from Wall's betrayal of Morrus, resulting in the breakup of Misfits in Action. Both men traded moves until Morrus delivered a German suplex and a No Laughing Matter to win the match. Morrus delivered the move again after the match.

The third match was a tag team match for the WCW World Tag Team Championship. Chuck Palumbo and Sean O'Haire defended the titles against Mark Jindrak and Shawn Stasiak. Both teams were former members of the Natural Born Thrillers. After a back and forth action, Palumbo and O'Haire finished Stasiak when Palumbo delivered a Jungle Kick and O’Haire delivered a Seanton Bomb to win the match and retain the titles.

Chavo Guerrero Jr. defended the Cruiserweight Championship against Rey Mysterio Jr. in the fourth match. Mysterio started the action with high paced quick and high-flying action. Both men traded moves until Guerrero brought a steel chair into the ring and placed it in the corner. He tried to toss Mysterio into the cornered chair but Mysterio avoided the move and gained the momentum. Mysterio tried to close the match by hitting Guerrero with the chair following a Tornado DDT but the referee took it away. Guerrero took advantage of the referee's distraction and grabbed another chair, hitting Mysterio with it and delivering a Brainbuster to win the match and retain his title.

In the next match, Rick Steiner defended the WCW United States Heavyweight Championship against Dustin Rhodes. Steiner won the match by exposing a turnbuckle and slamming Rhodes face-first into the exposed turnbuckle and pinning him by putting his feet on ropes to gain leverage. As a result, Steiner retained his title. After the match, Steiner delivered a Steiner Driver and cut a promo before going for another post-match assault on Rhodes but Rhodes countered with a Shattered Dreams.

Totally Buffed (Lex Luger and Buff Bagwell) were scheduled to take on KroniK (Brian Adams and Bryan Clark) in a tag team match to determine the #1 contenders for the World Tag Team Championship at Greed. However, Clark was injured before the match but appeared alongside Adams but Bagwell hit him with a steel chair to take him out of the match. Adams was left alone to fend off Totally Buffed, making it a handicap match. Adams tried to control the early portion of the match but was dominated by his opponents due to number disadvantage. Adams made a comeback by powerslamming Luger until Mike Awesome showed up and was disguised as Clark. He attacked Adams until Clark came to the ringside to brawl with Awesome in the aisle. Luger applied a Torture Rack on Adams and Bagwell delivered a Buff Blockbuster to Adams to win the match and earn the title shot for the tag team titles.

Lance Storm put his newly won position of WCW Commissioner against Ernest Miller. Miller started the match with his signature kicks until Storm began targeting his leg to slow the momentum. Miller attempted at a Feliner but Storm countered with a single leg takedown and applied a Maple Leaf which Miller reversed and delivered an enzuigiri. Mike Sanders appeared ringside to distract Miller, but Miller's valet Miss Jones kicked him. Miller took advantage of the situation and hit a Feliner for the win and won the position of WCW Commissioner, which would be effective by mid-night. After the match, Miller was ejected by the arena as the position had not been effective yet.

The final match on the undercard was Diamond Dallas Page versus Jeff Jarrett. However, Jarrett goaded Page into fighting Chris Kanyon into a match after a brawl between Page and Kanyon on that week's Nitro. Kanyon launched a sneak attack on Page from behind but Page soon countered Kanyon's offensive. Both men exchanged moves until Kanyon tried to win by delivering a Kanyon Kutter but got a near-fall. Kanyon called Jarrett to hit Page with an Acoustic Equalizer but Jarrett missed it and Page took advantage with a roll-up but Kanyon kicked out at 2. The referee was knocked out and Jarrett entered the ring to hit Page with a Stroke. Kanyon followed it with a Flatliner to win the match. After the match, Jarrett and Page began their match. Jarrett took advantage of Page's condition but Page managed to counter with a brawl at ringside. Page tried his Diamond Cutter on Jarrett on the announce table but Jarrett shoved him into Tony Schiavone. Jarrett controlled the match until Page made a comeback near the closing moments of the match. Kanyon returned to the ring to pull Page out of the ring, allowing Jarrett to nail Page with a chair shot and got a near-fall. Jarrett went for his Acoustic Equalizer on Page but he ducked and Kanyon was hit with it, allowing Page to deliver a Diamond Cutter to Jarrett to get the win.

=== Main event match ===
The main event was a loser leaves WCW match between Scott Steiner and Kevin Nash for the WCW World Heavyweight Championship. Nash won the title in just seventeen seconds by pinning Steiner after hitting him with a title belt. After the match, Ric Flair announced that the match was a two out of three falls match contested under no disqualification rules, thus continuing the match. Diamond Dallas Page appeared at the ringside to help Nash in the situation but Totally Buffed came to the ringside to take him out of the equation. Steiner's bodyguard Midajah interfered in the match and Steiner hit Nash with a steel pipe outside the ring. Steiner was unable to pick Nash and toss him into the ring, so Flair made it a falls count anywhere match and Steiner pinned Nash to win the second fall and even the score. The two men continued the action in the third fall. Flair handed a steel chair to Steiner and he hit Nash with it while Midajah held him. Steiner applied a Steiner Recliner on Nash but Nash escaped it. He tossed Steiner into the corner with a Snake Eyes and a big boot, followed by a Jackknife Powerbomb. Nash attempted a pinfall but the pinfall was broken up by Midajah. Nash delivered a side slam to Midajah. Flair tossed another chair to Steiner, allowing Steiner to hit Nash with the chair and he applied a Steiner Recliner to knock out Nash to get the win and retain the title, thus forcing Nash to leave WCW.

== Aftermath ==
Shane Helms got his title shot at the WCW Cruiserweight Championship at Chavo Guerrero Jr. at the Greed pay-per-view, where he defeated Guerrero to win the title. Totally Buffed received their title shot at the WCW World Tag Team Championship against Chuck Palumbo and Sean O'Haire at the event but failed to win the titles. Diamond Dallas Page got a title shot for the WCW World Heavyweight Championship against Scott Steiner due to interfering in Steiner's title match against Nash at SuperBrawl Revenge. Steiner defeated Page to retain the title in a falls count anywhere match at Greed, but lost the title to Booker T (who held the United States Championship) in a winner-take-all match on the final episode of WCW Monday Nitro on March 26, 2001.

== Reception ==
In 2007, Arnold Furious of 411Mania gave the event a rating of 5.0 [Not So Good], stating, "Hey, the cruiserweights tried really hard and got nowhere for it. The main eventers dogged it in a badly booked title match and the show left a bad taste in the mouth. Without the main event this isn’t such a bad show but the vibe it gave off was just unpleasant. And the crowd was awesome. They just didn’t deserve that. They were so optimistic. I guess you get shit on by WCW when you go into a show expecting something good. Basically I feel the main event went beyond the good will the crowd had for a WCW revival and they probably went home thinking “there goes that company”. Actually recommended as long as you stop before the last match but WCW's very final show Greed is more entertaining than this. Kinda weird that the shows would get progressively better when the company was dying."

== Results ==
No.	Results	Stipulations	Times
1^{D}	Chris Harris defeated Kid Romeo	Singles match	—
2	Shane Helms defeated Evan Karagias, Kaz Hayashi, Jamie Knoble, Shannon Moore and Yun Yang	Six-way Elimination match	17:30
3	Hugh Morrus defeated The Wall	Singles match	09:43
4	Sean O'Haire and Chuck Palumbo (c) defeated Mark Jindrak and Shawn Stasiak	Tag team match for the WCW World Tag Team Championship	11:37
5	Chavo Guerrero Jr. (c) defeated Rey Misterio Jr.	Singles match for the WCW Cruiserweight Championship	15:54
6	Rick Steiner (c) defeated Dustin Rhodes	Singles match for the WCW United States Heavyweight Championship	09:11
7	Totally Buffed (Lex Luger and Buff Bagwell) defeated Brian Adams	Handicap match	06:25
8	Ernest Miller (with Ms. Jones) defeated Lance Storm	Singles match for the position of WCW Commissioner	08:07
9	Chris Kanyon defeated Diamond Dallas Page	Singles match	08:15
10	Diamond Dallas Page defeated Jeff Jarrett	Singles match	08:30
11	Scott Steiner (c) (with Midajah and Ric Flair) defeated Kevin Nash 2–1	Two-out-of-three falls loser leaves WCW match for the WCW World Heavyweight Championship; Since Nash lost, he was forced to leave WCW.	11:04
(c) / – the champion(s) heading into the match; D / – this was a dark match

=== No. 1 Contender's match eliminations ===
Elimination no.	Wrestler	Eliminated by	Elimination move	Time
1	Evan Karagias	Yun Yang	Neckbreaker	10:21
2	Yun Yang	Jamie Knoble	Jumping reverse piledriver	10:51
3	Jamie Knoble	Shannon Moore	Bottoms Up	11:58
4	Shannon Moore	Shane Helms	Nightmare on Helms Street	15:11
5	Kaz Hayashi	Shane Helms	Vertebreaker	17:30
Winner:	Shane Helms			

=== Two out of three falls match results ===
Fall no.	Fall scoring move	Time
1	Nash pinned Steiner after hitting him with the title belt	00:17
2	Steiner pinned Nash after hitting him with a steel pipe	02:47
3	Steiner hit Nash with a steel chair and won via knockout with a Steiner Recliner	11:04
Winner:	Scott Steiner	
