= Jung Dragons =

Professional wrestling tag team

The Jung Dragons

Tag team
- Members: Kaz Hayashi; Yang; Jamie-San; Leia Meow (valet)
- Billed heights: 5 ft 9 in (1.75 m) each
- Debut: 2000
- Disbanded: 2005

The Jung Dragons were a professional wrestling faction and tag team. Originally formed in World Championship Wrestling, the Dragons consisted of Kaz Hayashi, Yang and Jamie-San, and their manager Leia Meow. The Jung Dragons were notable for their high-flying, cruiserweight wrestling style and somewhat humorous Asian theme. However, Jamie-San, the only Caucasian in the group, was given the Japanese title of "San" and wore a black mask in order to conceal the fact that he was not Asian.

== History ==
The group was put together in early 2000 by Jimmy Hart. He wanted to give the young talents a chance to tighten their skills in a feud with 3 Count, another young group formed by Hart, on WCW's lower rate program Saturday Night. According to Hart, he also bought the Jung Dragon ring attire and worked with WCW's seamstress to give them their logo. Booker Kevin Sullivan was so impressed with the group that he immediately put them on WCW's prime program, Nitro.

The Jung Dragons made their pay-per-view debut at New Blood Rising, losing a ladder match against 3 Count. From there, they participated in various tag team match types at Mayhem, Starrcade, Sin, and SuperBrawl Revenge and added a manager in Leia Meow. While the Dragons only scored one victory throughout these major events, the stable remained relatively popular up until the closure of WCW in 2001.

=== Split ===
By late 2000, both the Jung Dragons and 3 Count had begun falling apart. Jamie-San departed from the Jung Dragons, during which he unmasked and was renamed to Jamie Knoble, and formed a tag team with ex-3 Count member Evan Karagias. The two competed with the remaining members of 3 Count and the Jung Dragons. Finally, in early 2001, WCW was purchased by top competitor World Wrestling Federation, ultimately ending the Jung Dragons.

Following the closure of WCW, Jamie-San and Yang went on to work for World Wrestling Entertainment (the former World Wrestling Federation) as Jamie Noble and Akio, respectively. Noble won the Cruiserweight Championship shortly after his WWE debut and Akio found partial success as an ally of Tajiri before both were released in 2004 and 2005, respectively. After being released, Noble competed in Ring of Honor before being rehired in 2005, while Yang and Hayashi reformed the Jung Dragons before Yang was rehired in 2006 under the ring name Jimmy Wang Yang. Hayashi returned to Japan and has since become a staple of All Japan Pro Wrestling's junior heavyweight division while Leia retired from wrestling in 2002.
