= Teri Byrne =

American model and dancer

Personal information
- Born: April 11, 1972 (age 54) Pensacola, Florida

Professional wrestling career
- Ring name: Fyre
- Billed height: 5 ft 3 in (1.60 m)
- Billed weight: 109 lb (49 kg)
- Debut: ca. 1997
- Retired: ca. 2000

Teri Byrne (born April 11, 1972) is a former member of WCW's Nitro Girls and is a former fitness competitor. She is from Atlanta, Georgia and graduated from Arizona State University and the University of Phoenix.

== Career ==
Byrne attended Arizona State University in Tempe, Arizona and was a fitness enthusiast. She entered in numerous fitness competitions, including the Ujena calendar swimwear contest and Miss Fiesta Bowl for the Arizona State Sun Devils. After she completed her bachelor's degree, she moved to Atlanta and began attending Main Event Fitness in Marietta, Ga, which was owned by WCW wrestlers Sting and Lex Luger

== Professional wrestling career ==
Byrne met Kimberly Page and joined WCW's original Nitro Girls as Fyre on July 14, 1997, and stayed with them until 1999. She was a guest star on The Dating Game, Dinner and a Movie, Live with Regis and Kathie Lee, performed in Las Vegas on Halloween Havoc and starred in the movie Ready to Rumble with David Arquette, Sean Caan and Oliver Platt. She then opened a website as a model, made personal appearances across the country at various independent shows and radio appearances. She appeared in a non-nude Nitro Girls pictorial in the September 1998 issue of Penthouse, along with Melissa Bellin, Chae An, and Kimberly Page. She stayed with the company until January 2000, when she decided to leave after a change in creative direction regarding the Nitro Girls.

== Diversity 5 ==
Several former Nitro Girls members formed a pop music group called Diversity 5. The lineup initially included Teri Byrne (Fyre), Melissa Bellin (Spice), Sharmell Sullivan (Storm), Chae An (Chae), and Vanessa Sanchez (Tygress). Following Sullivan's departure to the WWF, Chiquita Anderson (Chiquita) joined the group as her replacement.

In 2001, Diversity 5 released a CD single featuring the tracks I Promise and Shake Me Up. The group also appeared on the Fox television reality program 30 Seconds to Fame on October 31, 2002, where they were eliminated from the competition.

== Later career ==
After her television career, Teri started a new career in higher education as an admissions counselor at the University of Phoenix. She was promoted to an admissions manager and then Director of Admissions in Augusta, Georgia. The campus achieved high performance for three consecutive years which led to her promotion to the Regional Director of Admissions for the Southeast region with the University of Phoenix. Teri relocated from Augusta, Georgia to Charlotte, NC in 2009 to travel as the Regional Director. Over the next ten years, Teri earned her MBA and worked as a Regional Director, corporate trainer and Campus President.

== Other media ==
In 2001 Byrne was actively involved with the development of a comic book entitled Stiletto about a bounty hunter portrayed by Teri. The book, originally to be titled Nytro, published by Gypsy Press Comics, was originally to be titled Nytro, but Turner Broadcasting would not allow them to use anything associated with their WCW franchise. Issue #1 of Stiletto formally debuted at the 2001 Wizard World Chicago convention on August 17, 2001.

== Personal life ==
Byrne grew up in Atlanta and spent a lot of time in the stables in which her father raised Arabian horses. She devoted much of her time to speaking out against cruelty to animals and the inhumane treatment of greyhounds and saddlebred horses. Byrne later graduated from Arizona State University with Honors in Communication.

Byrne lives in Charlotte, North Carolina where she works at a college as the Campus President.

== See also ==
- The Nitro Girls
