= 3 Count =

Professional wrestling stable

Stable
- Members: Shane Helms; Shannon Moore; Evan Karagias; Tank Abbott
- Name(s): 3 Count; Three Count
- Hometown: North Carolina
- Debut: December 1999
- Disbanded: 2000

3 Count was a professional wrestling stable in World Championship Wrestling (WCW) which formed in 1999. The group consisted of Shane Helms, Shannon Moore and Evan Karagias and they were given a boy band gimmick. For a brief time, Tank Abbott was added to the group as a manager and enforcer.

== History ==
=== Creation ===
Shane Helms and Shannon Moore both signed contracts in May 1999. In December 1999, Jimmy Hart put them together with Evan Karagias as a group to both capitalize on and make fun of the success of boy bands at the time.

Their gimmick was first introduced to the public with vignettes disguised as music videos for their (Hart penned) pop song "Can't Get You Outta My Heart". From there they progressed to performing live on WCW Monday Nitro, dancing on green circles in the ring and lip syncing their song before their matches. Later on they recorded a new song, "Dance With 3 Count", which replaced "Can't Get You Outta My Heart" as their theme music. They had a long-standing feud with another cruiserweight trio known as The Jung Dragons.

Helms and Moore squared off in the first round of the WCW Cruiserweight title tournament, with Moore advancing at the expense of his partner. The group were received as heels, and after three months captured (together) the WCW Hardcore Championship by pinning Brian Knobbs on February 28, 2000. They lost the title to Knobbs a month later, when he pinned all three members consecutively. In the process, however, Moore became the youngest champion in WCW history.

=== Tank Abbott ===
After losing the Hardcore Championship, Helms was legitimately taken out of action with a broken nose. Upon his return, 3 Count was joined by Tank Abbott, a storyline huge fan. Abbott hung around ringside when 3 Count performed and began protecting them from other wrestlers, and eventually started inserting himself as an (uninvited) back-up dancer during performances. 3 Count's feud with the Jung Dragons continued as the Dragons tried to steal 3 Count's Gold album and recording contract. This led to a ladder match at New Blood Rising. Abbott helped 3 Count to win, and afterwards left with both the album and the contract. Abbott claimed that he should be the lead singer of 3 Count, with which Helms, Moore and Karagias disagreed, leading to a feud between 3 Count and Abbott. It ended when Abbott left WCW soon after.

=== Break up ===
After feuding with the Misfits in Action, 3 Count began to have problems, as Moore and Helms accused Karagias of attempting to hog the limelight. Eventually, Moore and Helms kicked Karagias out of the group, and he joined forces with Jamie Knoble of the Jung Dragons, on whom the other Jung Dragons members had turned. Moore and Helms continued together to feud with the remaining Dragons (Kaz Hayashi and Yang) and the new team of Karagias and Knoble. The three teams met in a Triangle match at Mayhem in November 2000, which 3 Count won. They also met in a ladder match to decide the number one contender for the WCW Cruiserweight Championship at Starrcade, in which both Moore and Helms grabbed the contract at the same moment. As a result, Moore and Helms had match to determine who would challenge for the title, which Helms won. He lost the subsequent Cruiserweight Championship match, however, against Chavo Guerrero Jr. at Sin in January 2001. Helms and Moore split when, during a number one contenders match for the Cruiserweight title at SuperBrawl Revenge, Moore attacked Helms instead of Hayashi of the Jung Dragons. Helms, however, later eliminated Moore, and went on to win the match.

=== Aftermath ===
As WCW was slowly dying, Moore and Karagias put aside their differences and formed a tag team which vied for the short lived WCW Cruiserweight Tag Team Championship, but never got their hands on them before the company closed. Helms, however, won the WCW Cruiserweight Championship. Moore, Helms, and Karagias would go on to the then World Wrestling Federation. The 3 Count trademark was owned by Turner Broadcasting System Inc. until June 6, 2008.

=== Reunion ===
As announced by Shane Helms on Twitter, 3 Count would be reuniting in November 2014. The trio appeared at WrestleCade in Winston-Salem, North Carolina on November 29 at the Benton Convention Center. Helms, along with his proteges Trevor Lee and Andrew Everett, performed a 3 Count song during TNA's Total Nonstop Deletion.

== Championships and accomplishments ==
- NWA Wildside
  - NWA Wildside Tag Team Championship (1 time) – Helms and Moore
- World Championship Wrestling
  - WCW Hardcore Championship^{1} (1 time)

^{1}The WCW Hardcore Championship was held jointly among Helms, Moore, and Karagias using the Freebird Rule.
