= Insiders (professional wrestling) =

Professional wrestling tag team

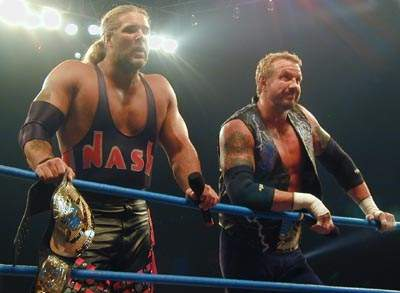
- Kevin Nash (left) and Diamond Dallas Page (right)

Tag team
- Members: Kevin Nash/Vinnie Vegas; Diamond Dallas Page
- Name(s): The Insiders; The Vegas Connection
- Billed heights: Nash: 7 ft 0 in (2.13 m); Page: 6 ft 5 in (1.96 m)
- Combined billed weight: 550 lb (250 kg; 39 st)
- Debut: 1992
- Disbanded: February 2001

The Insiders were a professional wrestling tag team in World Championship Wrestling (WCW) composed of Diamond Dallas Page and Kevin Nash. Together, the two wrestlers won the WCW World Tag Team Championship twice; the reigns were Nash's eighth and ninth and Page's third and fourth. Nash had previously been tag team champion six times with Scott Hall and once with Sting while Page's two other reigns were as part of the Jersey Triad with Kanyon and Bam Bam Bigelow.

== History ==
=== The Vegas Connection (1992) ===
Nash and Page's connection began while both were performing for WCW in 1991. Nash, who at the time was known as Vinnie Vegas, joined Page's continuation of his American Wrestling Association stable, the Diamond Exchange (known in WCW as the "Diamond Mine"). Nash's stablemates were Scott Hall, who was wrestling as the Diamond Studd at the time, and Scott Levy, who was known as Scotty Flamingo. After Hall left for the World Wrestling Federation at the end of the year, the remaining members of the group became known as the Vegas Connection as Page and Vegas would team and accompany Flamingo to the ring. This incarnation was short-lived, as Page suffered a torn rotator cuff in a match against Tex Slazenger and Shanghai Pierce in late 1992. Following the injury Nash and Levy left for the WWF, while Page was fired. While the three men would later wrestle in WCW at the same time once Levy— under his more popular name, Raven— rejoined WCW in 1997, there was no further effort made to team the three (although Nash had tried several times to recruit Page into the nWo once he made his return to the company in 1996).

=== The Insiders (2000–2001) ===
In late 2000, after The Natural Born Thrillers turned on Kevin Nash, DDP and Nash reformed their team and called themselves The Insiders, a play on Nash's team with Scott Hall, The Outsiders, and the reportedly close friendships each man had with WCW officials, particularly Eric Bischoff. They feuded with the Perfect Event (Shawn Stasiak and Chuck Palumbo) and won the WCW World Tag Team Championship at WCW Mayhem on November 26, 2000. Shortly after, they were stripped of the titles by Commissioner Mike Sanders in mid-December. Weeks later, they won the titles back at WCW Starrcade. By February 2001, the team had split up again, and the company was purchased by the World Wrestling Federation the following month.

== Championships and accomplishments ==
- World Championship Wrestling
  - WCW World Tag Team Championship (2 times)
