= Kristina Laum =

American professional wrestler, wrestling valet, and manager

Personal information
- Born: November 23, 1976 (age 49) Seoul, South Korea

Professional wrestling career
- Ring name(s): Kimona Wanalaya; Kimona Wanaleia; Kris; Leia Meow
- Billed height: 5 ft 1 in (1.55 m)
- Billed weight: 101 lb (46 kg)
- Debut: 1996
- Retired: 2001

Kristina Laum (born November 23, 1976) is a Korean retired professional wrestler, professional wrestling valet, and manager in Extreme Championship Wrestling and World Championship Wrestling. She used the names Kimona Wanalaya in ECW and Leia Meow in WCW.

== Professional wrestling career ==
=== Extreme Championship Wrestling (1996) ===
Laum was asked by her friend Raven to go into professional wrestling while she was working as a go-go dancer at a club. She made her debut in Extreme Championship Wrestling (ECW) on January 27, 1996, as Raven's new valet under the name Kimona Wanalaya (a play-on-words for "Come on, I wanna lay ya") and she managed Raven to win the ECW World Heavyweight Championship on the same night. According to the storyline, Raven used her to replace Beulah McGillicutty, his former girlfriend and valet, who had announced that she was pregnant with Tommy Dreamer's child on January 7 at ECW's House Party event.

Wanalaya left Raven at Massacre on Queens Boulevard on April 13 after he slapped her for remonstrating with him, causing her to vow revenge. On April 20, 1996, at Hostile City Showdown, Shane Douglas, with Kimona by his side, called out Dreamer to inform him that Beulah had been cheating on him. While Dreamer was wondering who the person could be, to which Douglas replied “it's not a he”, Kimona snatched the microphone from Douglas's hand and shouted "It's me!" Moments later, Beulah made her way to the ring and she and Kimona shared a racy kiss and fell to the mat together before Dreamer decided to date both women. The segment is widely believed to be the first sapphic angle in a major wrestling promotion.

=== Jersey All Pro Wrestling ===
Laum later left ECW and worked for Jersey All Pro Wrestling (JAPW) for a while as Kimona. While in JAPW, she wrestled Missy Hyatt in a series of mixed tag team matches and a steel cage match.

=== World Championship Wrestling (1999–2001) ===
She was signed by World Championship Wrestling (WCW) in 1999, and she eventually debuted alongside Varsity Club (Kevin Sullivan, Mike Rotunda and Rick Steiner) as the cheerleader, Leia Meow.

This angle soon ended and she became the manager for the Jung Dragons (Jamie-San, Yun Yang, and Kaz Hayashi), thus turning heel. She would interfere in matches with a flying bodypress off of the top rope onto their opponents. She also had a dominatrix gimmick and carried a riding crop. She used it to attack Pamela Paulshock after Paulshock had won the "Miss WCW" contest that Meow participated in on September 25, 2000. She was then attacked by Midajah and had a brief rivalry with her leading to a fight on the following Thunder during Mike Awesome's Lava Lamp Lounge segment. She also had a short feud with Tygress and threatened to cut her hair off. By the time WCW was sold to Vince McMahon in March 2001, she had been fired from WCW along with the majority of the other female talent due to roster cuts.

=== Independent circuit (2001, 2022) ===
She went to the X Wrestling Federation (XWF) where she was known as Kris, a member of the X-Girls, a dance team that included Gorgeous George and Chiquita Anderson of the Nitro Girls. When XWF ended, Kristina Laum retired from wrestling.

On April 1, 2022, she made an appearance at ICW No Holds Barred 24 in Newark, New Jersey.

== Championships and accomplishments ==
- Women's Wrestling Hall of Fame
  - Class of 2025
