= Midajah =

American personal trainer and professional wrestling manager (born 1970)

Personal information
- Born: Melinda Midajah McCullum; March 23, 1970 (age 56) Seattle, Washington, U.S.

Professional wrestling career
- Ring name(s): Midajah; Midajah O' Hearn
- Billed height: 5 ft 2 in (1.57 m)
- Billed weight: 118 lb (54 kg)
- Trained by: WCW Power Plant
- Debut: December 1999
- Retired: 2003

Melinda Midajah Flores (née McCullum; born March 23, 1970) is an American personal trainer, fitness model, beautician, former professional wrestling manager and actress, better known by her ring name, Midajah (/mɪdˈeɪʒə/ mi-DAY-zhə). She is best known for her appearances with World Championship Wrestling from 1999 to 2001.

== Nutrition and personal training ==
McCullum received a certification in personal training and nutrition in 1994. She then worked as a personal fitness trainer with several companies. Subsequently, she worked with a bodybuilding supplement company, in trade shows, and made personal appearances.

Between 1997 and 2000, McCullum was the cover model for fitness magazines such as Iron Man, MuscleMag and Muscular Development.

== Professional wrestling career ==
=== World Championship Wrestling (1999–2001) ===
In 1999, McCullum's agent, Rich Minzer, introduced her to Terry Taylor, an agent with the professional wrestling promotion World Championship Wrestling, who was recruiting fitness models. Taylor subsequently hired McCullum to serve as a valet for the New World Order stable.

McCullum joined World Championship Wrestling in December 1999. After training in the company's Power Plant wrestling school, McCullum made her professional wrestling debut in 2000 under the ring name Midajah (her middle name) as part of a group of fitness models (April Hunter, Major Gunns, Pamela Paulshock and Shakira) known as the nWo Girls. Midajah and Shakira soon transitioned into being the valets of Scott Steiner, who subsequently nicknamed them his "Freaks". After Shakira left WCW, McCullum then became the main valet for Steiner and became part of the Magnificent Seven. She had a brief feud with Leia Meow. She appeared on the final episode of Nitro in Steiner's corner as he was defeated by Booker T.

After WCW was acquired by the World Wrestling Federation (WWF) in March 2001, Midajah went on to participate in fitness competitions and model for fitness magazines such as Muscle & Fitness.

=== World Wrestling All-Stars and Ultimate Pro Wrestling (2002–2003) ===
In 2002, McCullum joined World Wrestling All-Stars and resumed managing Scott Steiner and also began managing Perry Saturn. While in WWA, Midajah made her in-ring debut on April 7, 2002, where she defeated Queen Bee in a singles match. On April 10, Midajah defeated Chantelle in a bra and panties match. On April 12, Midajah won her final match as she defeated Queen Bee in an evening gown match. After WWA folded, McCullum spent some time in Ultimate Pro Wrestling, where she trained at their wrestling school before leaving the profession altogether.

== Personal life ==
McCullum was formerly married to the American bodybuilder Michael O'Hearn. She is currently married to Kevin Flores.

McCullum is the eldest of four children and is of Norwegian, Irish, Spanish, and French descent. She attended school in both America and Mexico. While growing up, she participated in beauty pageants and worked as a child actress.

McCullum speaks Spanish fluently and has worked as an interpreter.

== Filmography ==
=== Film ===
Film roles
Year	Title	Role	Notes
1988	Don't Panic	Cristy	
2001	Bubble Boy	Red Hot	
2006	Date Movie	Sales Girl (uncredited)	

=== Television ===
Television roles
Year	Title	Role	Notes
1999	Love Boat: The Next Wave (1999)		Episode: "About Face"
2001	Days of Our Lives	Spanish Waitress	Episode 1.9065
2001	Days of our Lives' Christmas	Santa's Helper	
