= WCW Monday Nitro =

Professional wrestling television program

- Nitro logo from 1995 to 1999
- Genre: Professional wrestling
- Created by: Ted Turner; Eric Bischoff
- Directed by: Craig Leathers (1995–1999, January–March 2001); Rick Fansher (1999–April 2000); Mike Miller (April–December 2000)
- Starring: World Championship Wrestling roster
- Opening theme: "Monday Night Nitro Theme/Mean Streets" by Jonathan Elias (September 4, 1995 – March 29, 1999); "Adrenaline V.1" by Purity (April 5, 1999 – March 26, 2001)
- Country of origin: United States
- No. of seasons: 6
- No. of episodes: 288

Production
- Producers: Eric Bischoff; Craig Leathers; Vince Russo; Tony Schiavone
- Production location: Various locations in North America
- Camera setup: Multi-camera setup
- Running time: 1 hour (September 4, 1995 – May 20, 1996, April 28 – May 19, 1997, April 27, May 4, May 18, 1998, April 3, 2000); 2 hours (May 27, 1996 – April 21, 1997, May 26 – July 28, 1997, August 11–25, 1997, September 8 – December 15, 1997, December 29, 1997 – January 19, 1998, April 28, 1998, January 3 – March 27, 2000, April 10, 2000 – March 26, 2001); 3 hours (August 4, September 1, December 22, 1997, January 26 – April 20, May 11, May 25, 1998 – May 3, 1999, May 17 – December 27, 1999)

Original release
- Network: TNT
- Release: September 4, 1995 – March 26, 2001

Related
- WCW Thunder; WCW Saturday Night; WCW WorldWide; WCW Clash of the Champions; WCW Pro

WCW Monday Nitro, also known as WCW Nitro or simply Nitro, is an American professional wrestling television program that was produced by World Championship Wrestling (WCW) and broadcast weekly every Monday night on TNT in the United States from September 4, 1995 to March 26, 2001. Created by then WCW owner Ted Turner and Vice President Eric Bischoff, it was the flagship weekly show produced by the company.

Nitro featured wrestlers contracted to WCW. Besides broadcasting from various arenas and locations across the United States and Canada, such as Mall of America in Bloomington, Minnesota (from which the first episode was broadcast), Nitro also organized special broadcasts from the Disney-MGM Studios in Orlando in 1996; aired annual Spring Break-Out episodes from Panama City Beach, Florida or South Padre Island, Texas starting in March 1997; and filmed some episodes in Australia and the United Kingdom during the Fall of 2000.

At its peak, Nitro was the highest-rated show on primetime cable TV. Its premiere was notable for sparking a period of television known as the "Monday Night War": for the entirety of the show's run, Nitro went head-to-head in the ratings with the World Wrestling Federation's (WWF; now WWE) Monday Night Raw. Nitro began to dominate in ratings in 1996, based largely on the strength of the WCW's New World Order (nWo) kayfabe rebellious group. Raw began to overtake Nitro in the ratings in 1998 due to the WWF's revamped Attitude Era programming. In March 2001, TNT canceled the show.

The rights to WCW Monday Nitro now belong to WWE, who purchased WCW properties in 2001. The WWE has released three Best of WCW Monday Nitro DVD sets and all episodes are available for streaming on the WWE Network. In 2025, WWE started uploading episodes to a WCW YouTube channel.

== History ==
=== Premiere ===
The first episode of Nitro was broadcast from the Mall of America in Bloomington, Minnesota on September 4, 1995. The featured matches on the one-hour broadcast were Brian Pillman versus Jushin Thunder Liger, Ric Flair versus WCW United States Heavyweight Champion Sting, and WCW World Heavyweight Champion Hulk Hogan taking on Big Bubba Rogers. The show was also highlighted by the return of Lex Luger to WCW after having spent the previous two plus years wrestling for the WWF, where he had been one of the promotion's top stars. Luger had just wrestled a match for the WWF the previous evening; the match was his final contractual obligation with the WWF, and Luger signed with WCW the morning of his appearance. The event prefigured the similar defections of WWF wrestlers Scott Hall and Kevin Nash the following year.

The title video for the debut episode of Nitro featured multiple shots of Big Van Vader (one of four wrestlers featured, along with Hulk Hogan, Sting and Macho Man Randy Savage), who parted ways with WCW following a backstage altercation with Paul Orndorff. Absent from the first episode, he had been scheduled to face Hogan for the WCW World Heavyweight Championship on the September 11 edition, but was replaced by Lex Luger, who issued a challenge to Hogan on the debut show. Vader would never perform on Nitro, and embarked on a WWF career in January 1996.

=== Monday Night War ===
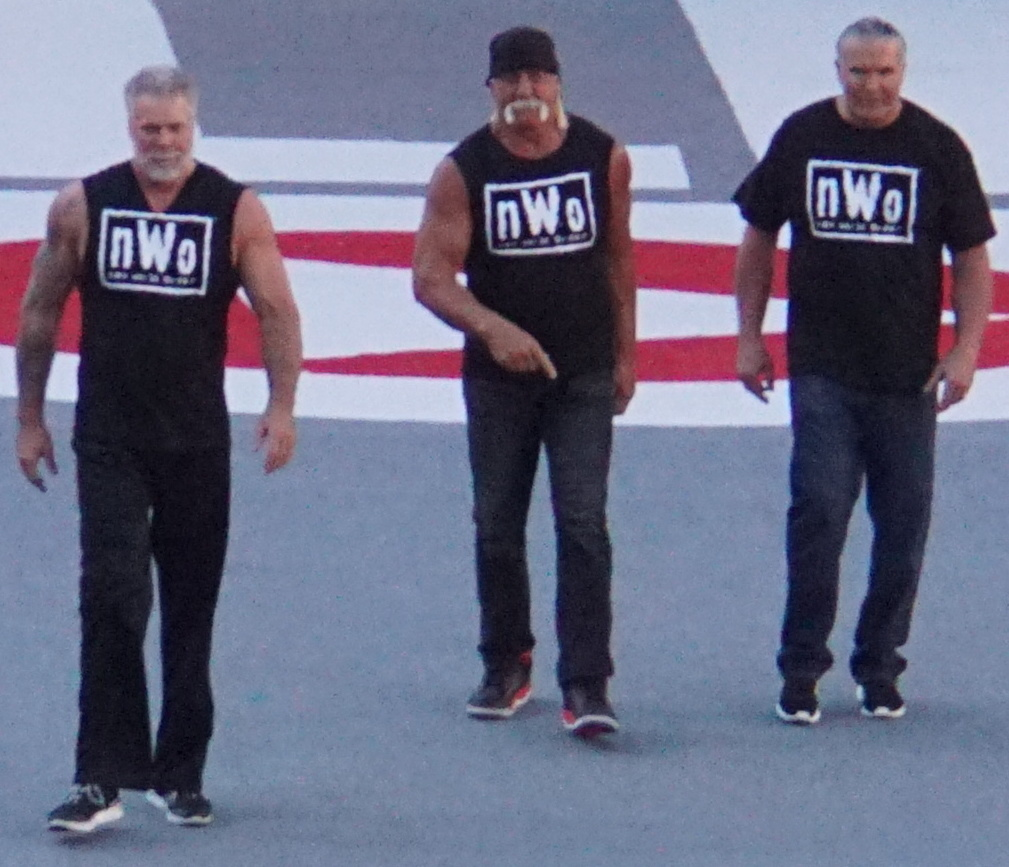
The nWo (Kevin Nash, Hollywood Hogan and Scott Hall) were major contributors to ratings success

The advent of Nitro brought with it a television ratings rivalry with the WWF's Monday Night Raw, known to wrestling fans as the "Monday Night War". Throughout this period, Nitro would grow in popularity and eventually surpass Raw in the ratings for 83 consecutive weeks, beginning in June 1996.

Since Nitro was live, the show was seen as far less predictable than its WWF counterpart. Initially only sixty minutes in length (as was Raw at the time), Nitro was expanded to two hours following the 1996 NBA Playoffs (Raw would later extend to two hours in February 1997). In January 1998, the show was extended to three hours. At its peak, the rivalry resulted in performers on either show trading verbal insults and challenges. In retaliation for a segment of Raw in which D-Generation X (DX) travelled to the Norfolk Scope arena in Norfolk where Nitro was being broadcast (WWF was nearby in Hampton, Virginia the same night), Eric Bischoff challenged Vince McMahon to face him in a match to be held at Slamboree 1998; McMahon never formally recognized the challenge and did not appear.

The July 6, 1998, episode of Nitro from the Georgia Dome in Atlanta saw Goldberg defeat Hollywood Hogan for the WCW World Heavyweight Championship.

Nitro is best remembered for the New World Order (nWo), with former WWF wrestlers Scott Hall, Kevin Nash and "Hollywood" Hulk Hogan as rebellious heels plotting to take over WCW. Despite ratings success, both the angle and stable would later be criticized for the heel wrestlers almost never losing, and for what was seen as overexposure. As the nWo expanded, the stable would ultimately split into several warring factions within itself, while most WCW-branded wrestlers would eventually become neutral.

=== Changes ===
Nitro's success forced WWF owner Vince McMahon to usher in the more adult-oriented "Attitude Era". In April 1998, Raw beat Nitro in the ratings for the first time in almost two years. The shows would continue to trade ratings wins back and forth until November 1998 when Raw pulled ahead of Nitro for good. WCW was frequently criticized for several faults, including an inability to create new stars while over-relying on established stars to support ratings.

On January 4, 1999 Mick Foley, who had wrestled for WCW during the early 1990s as Cactus Jack, won the WWF Championship as Mankind on a pre-taped episode of Raw. Nitro announcer Tony Schiavone sarcastically commented on the match, which unexpectedly resulted in Nitro losing in the ratings battle when several hundred thousand viewers switched over to Raw to see the title change. That night's episode of Nitro would be notorious for the "Fingerpoke of Doom", in which a WCW World Heavyweight Championship match between Kevin Nash and Hollywood Hogan was quickly revealed to be a ruse that reunited the core members of the nWo as the "nWo Elite". The match was universally panned and was considered to have damaged WCW's credibility and begin their decline.

In October 1999, former WWF writers Vince Russo and Ed Ferrara were hired by WCW. Both men attempted to bring their WWF-style writing to Nitro, including edgier storylines, lengthier non-wrestling segments, and an increased amount of sexuality. Many WCW fans greatly resented Russo and Ferrara for changing their programming to be like the WWF, as they preferred the traditional method of wrestling over long skits, screwjobs, and risque innuendo that were widely popular among WWF audiences.

Nitro would be reduced to two hours in January 2000, returning the program to an 8-10 p.m. timeslot, with the first hour running unopposed and the second hour competing with the first hour of Raw. Eric Bischoff would be brought back to Nitro and was paired with Russo to "reboot" WCW on April 10, 2000. None of these changes were able to help recover Nitro's ratings and Bischoff eventually left WCW in July 2000 after an incident involving Hogan and Russo at the Bash at the Beach event. Russo would later suffer a severe concussion after being speared through a cage by Goldberg, later leaving WCW on extended leave to recover. Further declines from late 2000 would see WCW search for new ownership beginning in early 2001.

== Notable episodes ==
Episode Title	Date	Venue	Location	Rating	Note
WCW Monday Nitro	September 4, 1995	Mall of America	Bloomington, Minnesota	2.5	First episode of Nitro. See above for more information.
Tuesday Nitro	July 22, 1997	Jacksonville Coliseum	Jacksonville, Florida	4.1	
nWo Monday Nitro	December 22, 1997	Macon Coliseum	Macon, Georgia	3.5	The nWo take over the last 2 hours of Nitro.
Spring Break	March 16, 1998	Club La Vela	Panama City Beach, Florida	5.6	Free event held in the Boardwalk Beach Resort's Club La Vela.
WCW Monday Nitro	July 6, 1998	Georgia Dome	Atlanta, Georgia	4.9	Event held at the Georgia Dome, 41,412 attended the event making it the highest WCW Nitro attendance. Main Event: Goldberg wins first World Heavyweight title by defeating Hollywood Hogan. The second hour had a tv rating of 5.6.
WCW Monday Nitro	August 31, 1998	Miami Arena	Miami, Florida	6.0	Nitro reaches its highest rated episode. The Wolfpac's Lex Luger and Sting battled nWo Hollywood's Hulk Hogan and Bret Hart in the main event.
"Fingerpoke of Doom"	January 4, 1999	Georgia Dome	Atlanta, Georgia	5.0	Goldberg was arrested before his title match for the WCW World Heavyweight Championship. Later, Tony Schiavone, on orders from Eric Bischoff, gave away Mankind's pre-taped WWF title victory on Raw, which resulted in over 600,000 viewers switching to Raw.
New Year's Evil	December 27, 1999	Houston Astrodome	Houston, Texas	2.8	Special New Year's edition of Nitro. The name was later revived in 2021 as a yearly New Year's-themed special episode of WWE NXT.
Spring Breakout 2000	March 27, 2000	Sheraton South Padre	South Padre Island, Texas	2.6	Free event held on the beachfront of the Sheraton Beach Resort Hotel.
WCW Monday Nitro	April 3, 2000			1.8	Before the official "reboot", the most memorable moments of Nitro are revisited.
WCW Monday Nitro	April 10, 2000	Pepsi Center	Denver, Colorado	3.1	WCW is "rebooted" by Eric Bischoff and Vince Russo and all WCW titles are vacated.
WarGames 2000	September 4, 2000	Reunion Arena	Dallas, Texas	3.6	On the fifth anniversary of the premiere, a WarGames match took place in a three-tiered cage between two teams for the world championship. Kevin Nash retained the title.
The Night of Champions	March 26, 2001	Boardwalk Beach Resort	Panama City Beach, Florida	3.0	Final episode of Nitro. WCW is purchased by the WWF. See below for more information.

=== The Night of Champions – Final broadcast ===
The Night of Champions
- Promotion: World Championship Wrestling
- Date: March 26, 2001
- City: Panama City Beach, Florida
- Venue: Boardwalk Beach Resort

Night of Champions chronology
← Previous; First	Next → Vengeance: Night of Champions

In an attempt to save WCW and Nitro, Bischoff attempted to purchase WCW with a group of investors. However, although Bischoff's offer had been accepted, recently appointed Turner Broadcasting executive Jamie Kellner announced shortly after his arrival that Nitro and all WCW programming was immediately canceled on both TNT and TBS. Bischoff's group then withdrew their deal, as it was contingent on keeping WCW programming on some outlet. Instead, WCW's trademarks and certain assets (such as its video library and the contracts of 24 wrestlers), though not the promotion itself (which continued to exist as a Time Warner-owned legal entity under the name Universal Wrestling Corporation until late 2017), were bought by Vince McMahon's WWF, its long-time competitor.

Around the time of the cancellation, WCW was preparing to make its yearly trip to Panama City, Florida for spring break. Since the premiere of Nitro, WCW had gone to Club La Vela or South Padre Island every March to try to gain favor with adolescent and young adult viewers who might not otherwise be tuning into the program. It was announced that the upcoming March 26, 2001, episode of Nitro from Panama City (which was actually held at the nearby Boardwalk Beach Resort) was to be the finale and the show was dubbed "The Night of Champions." The show began with McMahon appearing via satellite from Gund Arena in Cleveland, Ohio, the site of that Monday's Raw is War broadcast on TNN. McMahon announced his purchase of WCW to the crowd and appeared in vignettes throughout the show, including one where he terminated WCW's Jeff Jarrett on air due to bad blood the two had in the past.

The show was unique in that all five of WCW's major championships (excluding the WCW Hardcore Championship) were defended that night and in six of the seven matches contested on the show, the faces won. (Traditionally WCW was seen as the promotion where heels were often the top stars as opposed to the WWF, where faces were often the top stars. Shawn Stasiak was the only heel to emerge victorious on the final episode of Nitro.) In addition, various WCW wrestlers were interviewed giving their honest, out-of-character responses to the sale of WCW. The co-main event of the evening was WCW World Heavyweight Champion Scott Steiner taking on WCW United States Heavyweight Champion Booker T in a match with both belts on the line; Booker T defeated Steiner for his fourth WCW World Heavyweight Championship while retaining the WCW United States Heavyweight Championship.

Just as it had been on the initial Nitro, the final match of the final Nitro and the final match in WCW as a whole was between long-time WCW rivals Ric Flair and Sting, a match that was more informal than their usual encounters (Sting and Flair were seen smiling and nodding respectfully towards each other throughout the match). Sting won using his finishing move, the Scorpion Deathlock. After the match, the two competitors stood in the middle of the ring and embraced to show respect for one another.

Shane McMahon revealing he kayfabe 'bought' WCW on the simulcast.

In a closing segment, simulcast between both Nitro and Raw, Vince addressed the audience in Cleveland and gloated about the purchase, stating that he wanted Turner to personally deliver the sale contract to him so he could sign it at WrestleMania X-Seven that weekend. However, the speech was interrupted by Vince's son Shane McMahon, who announced (in kayfabe) from Nitro that he had already signed the sale contract himself, and that WCW would continue to compete against the WWF. The twist came as part of the setup of their match at WrestleMania X-Seven, and of what would later become the WWF's "Invasion" storyline.

In addition to the tape library and other intellectual properties, the WWF also purchased several contracts of WCW talent, keeping many of the younger stars. Four of WCW's championships found their way into the WWF; in addition to Booker T carrying both the WCW Championship (as it was renamed) and United States Championship with him into the WWF, McMahon also signed then-WCW Cruiserweight Champion Shane Helms and then-WCW Tag Team Champions Chuck Palumbo and Sean O'Haire to contracts. Palumbo and O'Haire would defeat Team Canada (Mike Awesome and Lance Storm) on the final episode of Nitro. (The WWF scrapped the WCW Hardcore Championship, as it was officially retired immediately following the final Nitro despite no one holding it since Meng departed for the WWF in early 2001, and the WCW Cruiserweight Tag Team Championship for undisclosed reasons; Billy Kidman and Rey Mysterio were the last champions and McMahon was only able to sign Kidman to a contract at the time.)

"The Night of Champions" was the penultimate WCW broadcast, prior to the final episode of WorldWide on the weekend of March 31–April 1, 2001. WCW Monday Nitro was the last professional wrestling program to air on TNT until the first episode of AEW Dynamite on October 2, 2019.

==== Results ====
No.	Results	Stipulations	Times
1	Booker T (US) defeated Scott Steiner (World) (with Midajah)	Singles match for the WCW World Heavyweight and United States Heavyweight Championships	5:08
2	The Filthy Animals (Rey Mysterio and Billy Kidman) defeated 3 Count (Evan Karagias and Shannon Moore) and The Jung Dragons (Kaz Hayashi and Yun Yang)	Triple threat match to determine the #1 contenders for the WCW Cruiserweight Tag Team Championship	3:37
3	Shane Helms (c) defeated Chavo Guerrero Jr.	Singles match for the WCW Cruiserweight Championship	4:38
4	The Natural Born Thrillers (Sean O'Haire and Chuck Palumbo) (c) defeated Team Canada (Mike Awesome and Lance Storm)	Tag team match for the WCW World Tag Team Championship	3:20
5	Shawn Stasiak (with Stacy Keibler) defeated Bam Bam Bigelow	Singles match	1:24
6	The Filthy Animals (Rey Mysterio and Billy Kidman) defeated Elix Skipper and Kid Romeo (c)	Tag team match for the WCW Cruiserweight Tag Team Championship	4:43
7	Sting defeated Ric Flair by submission	Singles match	7:19
(c) / – the champion(s) heading into the match

== Other notable moments ==
When then-WWF Women's Champion Alundra Blayze signed with WCW in 1995 (going back to her old name of "Madusa"), she brought the WWF Women's title belt with her and threw it in a trash can on the December 18, 1995 episode of Nitro (the third week that Nitro started before the top of the hour), and the title itself would become inactive for the next three years. Many cite this incident as one of the causes of the infamous Montreal Screwjob. This infamous event would be parodied by WCW on a 2000 episode of Nitro, when Scott Hall threw the WCW World Television Championship in the trash and "Hacksaw" Jim Duggan found and claimed the belt weeks later on an episode of Saturday Night.

The only wrestler to appear on both Nitro and Raw on the same night was Rick Rude. Rude was able to appear on both shows because he was not under contract with the WWF at the time, appearing on a handshake deal with McMahon on Raw – which was still pre-recorded at the time while Nitro was broadcast live. To emphasize that only Nitro was live, Rude had a full beard on the Raw broadcast but only a mustache on Nitro.

The January 13, 1997 episode of Nitro ended with the first two minutes of the Hollywood Hogan vs. The Giant main event. Before the show went off the air, commentator Tony Schiavone announced the match was to continue during the commercial breaks of The New Adventures of Robin Hood, which premiered that night after Nitro. This resulted in the premiere episode of Robin Hood receiving high ratings due to WCW fans being lured in to watch the show for the Hogan/Giant match.

The rock band Kiss appeared in August 1999, and debuted a wrestler named The Demon while performing "God of Thunder". According to Dean Malenko, it was the lowest rated Nitro ever.

Throughout the late summer and early fall of 1999, in an attempt to boost the show's declining ratings, WCW organized a competition to find a new member of the Nitro Girls. Over the course of eight weeks, 300 women took part in the competition; two women who successfully passed the regional auditions were subject to Internet voting by home viewers. Eight women were selected to participate in the final round of the competition, which was held on the November 8, 1999 episode of Nitro. Stacy Keibler was declared the winner of the competition after receiving the most internet votes among the eight finalists, and received a spot on the dance troupe along with a cash prize of $10,000.

== International broadcasts ==
In Canada, WCW Monday Nitro began airing by local stations in 1996 on Saturday afternoons in a condensed one hour format. In 1997, The Sports Network (TSN) began broadcasting Nitro on Wednesday evenings, two days after the airing in the United States.

Nitro also aired in other regions. In Germany, it aired on DSF. In France, Nitro aired in a condensed form on Canal+'s Les Superstars du catch programme from 1997 to 2000, after that on RTL9. In Britain, it aired beginning in 1996 on TNT. In Russia the programme aired on TNT from 1998 (no relation to the American TNT).

== Home media and streaming ==
=== DVD and Blu-ray releases ===
Since buying the WCW video library, WWE Home Video has included many Nitro matches and segments on some of their Superstar biography DVD sets. A 3-disc DVD entitled The Very Best of WCW Monday Nitro was produced and released by WWE on June 7, 2011. The set is narrated by former three time WCW champion Diamond Dallas Page and highlights some of the biggest matches and moments in the history of WCW Monday Nitro. The sequel, The Best of WCW Monday Nitro Vol. 2 was released on DVD and Blu-ray February 12, 2013. Followed by the final set titled, The Very best of WCW Monday Nitro Vol. 3, which was released on August 11, 2015.

=== Video streaming ===
Episodes were also streamed on WWE Classics on Demand, as part of The Monday Night War feature. While the service did show episodes of Nitro, they are often edited. Some WCW entrance theme music tracks are replaced with stock WWE music. A lot of the crowd noise is also removed on most episodes and pay-per-views. Beginning in July 2007, WWE Classics on Demand began deleting content from episodes of Nitro, as matches and some references to Chris Benoit are removed. Benoit is sometimes shown in segments where he is not the main issue of the segment. This was in light of the controversy surrounding the deaths of Benoit and his family on June 24 of that year.

In April 2009, WWE Classics went back to the first episodes that aired in September 1995. These shows alternate with the current Nitro airings (December 1997 and onwards).

Sucribers to the WWE Network had access to all 288 episodes to stream. With the closure of the WWE Network in 2026, it is no longer possible to find the entire back catalogue to stream. Instead, WWE have made select episodes available for free streaming on their WCW YouTube channel.

== See also ==
- 1995 in American television
