= The Nitro Girls =

Professional wrestling dance troupe

Stable
- Members: See below
- Debut: July 14, 1997
- Disbanded: March 26, 2001

The Nitro Girls were a dance team in World Championship Wrestling introduced in July 1997. Centered around Kimberly Page, the group generally consisted of a roster of seven members, all of whom had some degree of professional dance experience. Their initial function was to dance and entertain the live crowds during commercial breaks of WCW Monday Nitro as well as engage in promotional work for the company, however, beginning in late 1999, many of the members began to become involved in wrestling storylines and acted as valets and managers to the wrestlers. The group was de facto disbanded by early 2000, with a number of the former members having adopted entirely new personas.

== History ==
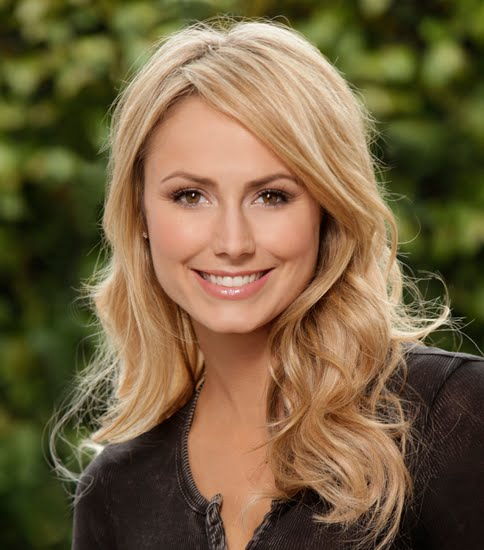
Stacy Keibler earned her way into the group by winning a contest held in late 1999.

The Nitro Girls were formed in 1997 by Kimberly Page at Eric Bischoff's request and made their debut on July 14 in Orlando, Florida. Their main focus was to entertain the live fans during the commercials of Monday Nitro. They also regularly performed in short segments on the show.

The Nitro Girls filmed their own pay-per-view, dubbed "The Nitro Girls Swimsuit Calendar Special" which aired on August 3, 1999 and was later released on home video.

In late 1999, the group held a competition to find a new member. 300 women took part in the contest; the results were decided by a series of polls on WCW's website, which narrowed down the field to eight finalists. On the November 8, 1999, edition of Nitro, Stacy Keibler was declared the winner of the contest after receiving the most votes out of the eight finalists; she received a spot on the dance troupe, along with a $10,000 prize. Her winning routine was watched by 4.4 million viewers.

The Nitro Girls also made appearances at WCW promotional events and the WCW-produced film Ready to Rumble. As the group became more and more involved in storylines, it slowly dissolved, but never officially broke up until 2001 when WCW was sold to Vince McMahon's World Wrestling Federation.

=== Involvement in storylines ===
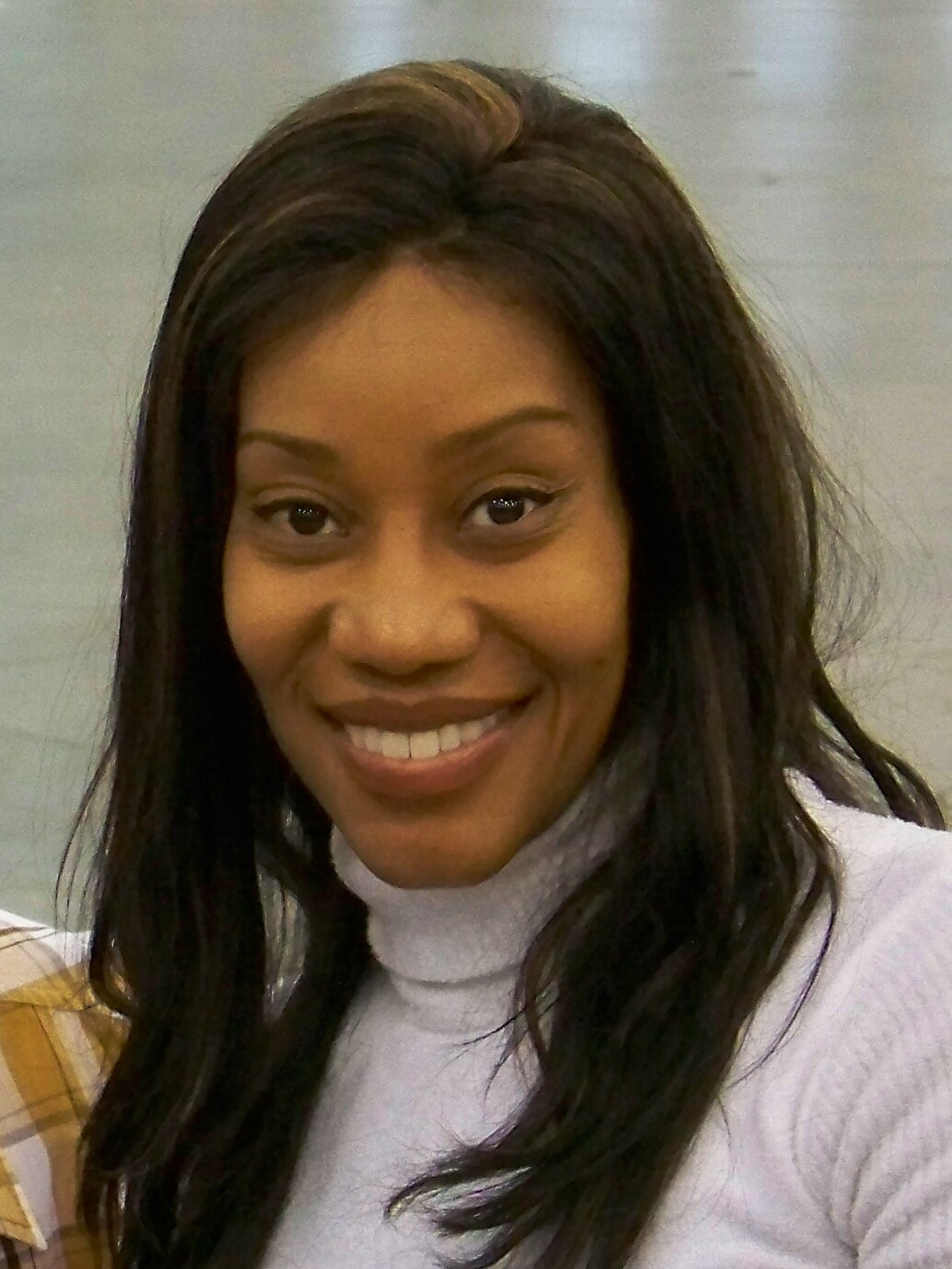
As part of the Nitro Girls transforming roles, Sharmell Sullivan transitioned from the character of Nitro Girl Storm to Paisley.

In October 1999, Kimberly Page began to appear with husband and wrestler Diamond Dallas Page. At Halloween Havoc, she claimed that Ric Flair spanked her 14 times after she was going to drug his son David Flair in a hotel room. Diamond Dallas Page wrestled Ric Flair in a strap match. On the November 1, 1999, episode of Nitro, Kimberly quit the group as a result of her husband being injured by David Flair; she then ran him over with her car.

After Kimberly left, the Nitro Girls began to feud with each other; Spice feuded with A.C. Jazz over the new leadership position and won. After Jazz left the group, Tygress attempted to gain control.

On the November 22, 1999, episode of Nitro, Spice and Tygress competed in the first professional wrestling match involving any of the group's members; Tygress defeated Spice after the latter suffered an injury to her eye.

By early 2000, the Nitro Girls broke up and began to go their own way within WCW. Kimberly Page joined The New Blood. Sharmell Sullivan became Paisley, a valet for The Artist (Prince Iaukea), and later went to the WWE. Stacy Keibler began appearing as Miss Hancock (the manager for the tag team Standards and Practices) before going to the WWE.

== Diversity 5 ==
Several former Nitro Girls formed a pop music group called Diversity 5: Teri Byrne (Fyre), Melissa Bellin (Spice), Sharmell Sullivan (Storm), Chae An (Chae) and Vanessa Sanchez (Tygress). When Sharmell went to the WWF, Chiquita Anderson (Chiquita) replaced her. The D5 group released one CD single "I Promise/Shake Me Up" in 2001. The group appeared on the Fox reality show 30 Seconds to Fame on October 31, 2002, and were promptly voted off.

== Members ==
Nitro Girl name	Real name	Years	Notes
AC Jazz	Amy Crawford	1997–1999	Born on April 1, 1971, in Douglasville, Georgia, Crawford was a graduate of Jacksonville State University and was a cheerleader for the Atlanta Falcons for two years before joining. One of the original members, she initially handled the dance team's choreography and costume design. Crawford left the company in November 1999 due to disagreements with WCW management. On air, she feuded with Spice. She runs a cheerleading company.
Baby	Shannon McNeill	2000	Born on September 15, 1976 in Wilkesboro, North Carolina, McNeill graduated from the University of North Carolina with a degree in special education and was a cheerleader for the Charlotte Hornets before joining the Nitro Girls in early 2000. During her time in WCW, she and Chameleon were valets for "Champagne" Chris Kanyon. She eventually left WCW and returned to college before the end of the year.
Beef	Rhonda Sing	1999–2000	Sing competed in the women's division in WCW from 1999 to 2000 and made a couple appearances with the Nitro Girls as Beef for comic relief. Died in 2001 at 40 from a heart attack. She was the oldest Nitro Girl.
Chae	Chae An	1997–2000	Born on March 11, 1973 in Seoul, South Korea graduated from Armstrong State University in Savannah, Georgia, with a General Studies degree. She was a cheerleader for the Atlanta Falcons and became an original in 1997. She was a member of the troupe until 2000 and appeared in a non-nude Nitro Girls pictorial in the September 1998 issue of Penthouse, along with Melissa Bellin, Teri Byrne, and Kimberly Page. She got married on October 27, 2007. Today, she's the founder and creator of Ring Along.
Chameleon	Carmel Macklin	1999-2000	Born on March 2, 1976, in Pittsburgh, Pennsylvania, Macklin graduated from Temple University with a degree in psychology. She debuted in 1999 and occasionally accompanied Chris Kanyon (during his "Champagne" Chris Kanyon gimmick) to the ring as his valet with Baby. In 2000, she left the Nitro Girls and became the valet for Ernest Miller as Ms. Jones. Macklin danced along with Miller in his post-match dance routine and later also acted as Miller's assistant when he was WCW Commissioner. She and Miller defeated Major Gunns and Lance Storm in her only wrestling match (a mixed tag team match) on the December 18, 2000, edition of Nitro. After World Championship Wrestling was sold to the World Wrestling Federation, Macklin became an actress and appeared in her first film, Love & Orgasms, in 2003.
Chiquita	Chiquita Anderson	2000–2001	Born Chiquita Adams on November 22, 1974, Anderson graduated from Philadelphia University of the Arts with an associate's degree in dance. After the Nitro Girls were disbanded, Anderson then became part of the pop music group Diversity 5 with other former Nitro Girls when Sharmell Sullivan left the group. She was part of the short-lived Xtreme Wrestling Federation's X-Girls in 2001 with Stephanie Bellars and Kristina Laum.
Fyre	Teri Byrne	1997–1999	Born in Pensacola, Florida on April 11, 1972. Byrne last worked at the University of Phoenix.
Gold; Silver	Diane (Gold) and Elaine (Silver) Klimaszewski	2000	The sisters were later cast as the Coors Light Twins in 2002. The sisters have appeared on the game show Steve Harvey's Big Time Challenge, as the Big Time Twins. They appeared as alien strippers in the first episode of Star Trek: Enterprise episode "Broken Bow".
Kimberly	Kimberly Page (Note: Kimberly's real name is Kimberly Lynne Bacon, but goes by Kimberly Page for all non-Nitro Girl appearances.)	1997–1999	Founder and leader of the Nitro Girls. Was married to Diamond Dallas Page at the time.
Naughty-A	Jamie Cragwall	2000–2001	Born in Nashville, Tennessee, on June 1, 1978, Cragwall joined WCW in October 2000, and was one of the last members of the Nitro Girls before the promotion's demise.
Skye	Stacy Keibler	1999	The winner of the 1999 Nitro Girl Search, Keibler later joined WWE. She left the company in 2006 after appearing on Dancing with the Stars, placing third in the show's second season. And was inducted into the WWE Hall of Fame class of 2023 in Los Angeles.
Spice	Melissa Bellin	1997–2000	Born Melissa Grill on May 29, 1973, she was one of the original Nitro Girls. She is married and has a son. She works as a life coach.
Starr (Sapphire)	Jennifer Bancale	2000–2001	Born on April 28, 1970, joined the group in May 2000 under the name "Sapphire", before her name was changed to "Starr".
Storm	Sharmell Sullivan	1998–1999	After leaving the Nitro Girls, Sullivan managed The Artist under the name Paisley. Sullivan would later marry Booker T. She regularly appeared on WWE television in 2003 as a backstage interviewer and from 2005 to 2007 as the valet of Booker T. In 2022, she was inducted into the WWE Hall of Fame.
Syren	Allison Pfau	2000–2001	Born May 4, 1976, she was involved in a storyline romance with Billy Kidman and Reno, her "boyfriend" after he broke up with Torrie Wilson and she sided with Shane Douglas.
Tayo	Tayo Reed	1997–1998	Born on February 28, 1971, after leaving the group, she began a career as a country singer. Reed started entertaining as a singer at Six Flags Over Georgia, performing in the Shake, Rattle, & Soul Show. She was then chosen to be a cheerleader for the Atlanta Falcons and a dancer for the Atlanta Hawks. Tayo also opened Tayo Reed's International Academy of Dance in Riverdale, Georgia.
Tygress	Vanessa Sanchez	1998–2000	Born Vanessa Bozman on January 21, 1971, in Syosset, New York, she graduated from Oglethorpe University with a degree in accounting. She later became a certified public accountant. She joined the Nitro Girls in 1998, but left them in 2000 to become a wrestler and valet for The Filthy Animals stable. She feuded with Misfits in Action's valet Major Gunns and Torrie Wilson. At Halloween Havoc, she and Konnan defeated Wilson and Shane Douglas.
Whisper	Rebecca Curci	1997–1999	Born on June 16, 1973, Curci joined the Nitro Girls as Whisper in October 1997. Her signature move was to put a finger to her lips at the end of each routine, in keeping with the name "Whisper". She left WCW in 1999 to marry wrestler Shawn Michaels. She and Michaels have two children, one son, Cameron Kade, born January 5, 2000, and a daughter, Cheyenne Michelle, born on August 19, 2004. Rebecca has appeared various times on WWE programming such as WrestleMania 22 and later appeared at the WWE Hall of Fame induction ceremony in 2011.

== See also ==
- WWF Divas
- TNA Knockouts
