= WCW Hardcore Championship =

Former professional wrestling title

- The Hardcore belt

Details
- Promotion: World Championship Wrestling
- Date established: July 11, 1999
- Date retired: January 21, 2001

Other names
- WCW World Hardcore Championship (1999); Saskatchewan Hardcore International Title (2000)
Statistics
- First champion: Norman Smiley
- Final champion: Meng
- Most reigns: Brian Knobbs and Terry Funk (3 reigns)
- Longest reign: Norman Smiley (51 days)
- Shortest reign: Carl Ouellet (38 minutes)
- Oldest champion: Terry Funk (56 years)
- Youngest champion: Shannon Moore (with 3 Count) (20 years)
- Heaviest champion: Bam Bam Bigelow (360 lb (160 kg))
- Lightest champion: Shannon Moore (with 3 Count) (181 lb (82 kg))

The World Championship Wrestling (WCW) Hardcore Championship was a title in World Championship Wrestling (WCW) that was active from July 11, 1999 to January 21, 2001. The title was defended in Hardcore matches, in which there were few rules and restrictions and weapons were allowed. Eventually, the rules were changed so that matches began in the backstage area but would only end by pinfall in the ring, but later were changed back to 'Falls Count Anywhere' rules. The belt was created in response to the growing popularity of hardcore wrestling in North America.

The WCW Hardcore Title was a continuation from the WCW Hardcore Trophy that Fit Finlay won in the Junkyard Battle Royal that took place at the 1999 Bash at the Beach pay-per-view. Shortly after the PPV, the trophy was seized by Eric Bischoff and removed from television. Afterwards Norman Smiley was crowned first official WCW hardcore champion.

== History ==
The title lasted from 1999 to 2001. During Bash at the Beach (1999), Fit Finlay won a "junkyard invitational" to be crowned "WCW Hardcore Champion". However, this would end up being a trophy and thus unrecognized in the lineage of the championship. The first recognized WCW Hardcore champion was Norman Smiley, who defeated Brian Knobs in Toronto, Ontario, at the WCW pay-per-view Mayhem on November 21, 1999. Other notable champions are: 3 Count, who won and defended the belt as a trio; Brian Knobbs, who held the belt a record three times and was the one to defeat 3 Count at Uncensored 2000; and Terry Funk, a three-time champion who also held the title for a period of almost two months, from April to June 2000, when he was defeated by Eric Bischoff at a WCW Monday Nitro in Atlanta, Georgia. Bischoff later awarded the title to Big Vito as a reward for helping him take it from Funk. In 2000, as part of a storyline where he renamed singles titles that he had won, Lance Storm won the Hardcore Championship and, as he had done with the Cruiserweight and U.S. titles (renaming them the 100 Kilos and Under and Canadian championships), changed the name of the title to the Saskatchewan Hardcore International Title (or S.H.I.T for short).

The final hardcore champion in WCW was Meng, who defeated Crowbar and reigning champ Terry Funk at WCW Sin on January 14, 2001. It was largely abandoned after Meng left the company to return to the WWF. Meng presented the championship to Barbarian as a gift at an independent wrestling event on January 21, 2001. The belt was not defended again nor was it featured on the final episode of Nitro which was also known as "Night of Champions". The title belt was handed over formally to the WWF upon the purchase of WCW. The title is now displayed in WWE headquarters in Stamford, Connecticut.

== Reigns ==
Norman Smiley held the record for the longest official reign at 51 days. The shortest reign was that of Carl Ouellet, who was awarded the title after Lance Storm gave it up but lost it 38 minutes later to Norman Smiley. Brian Knobbs and Funk hold the record for most reigns with three each and Smiley holds the record for most cumulative days as champion.

== See also ==
- WWE Hardcore Championship
- WWE 24/7 Championship
