= Filthy Animals =

Professional wrestling stable

Stable
- Members: Konnan; Rey Mysterio Jr. Billy Kidman; Eddie Guerrero; Juventud Guerrera; Disqo; Torrie Wilson; Tygress
- Name: The Filthy Animals
- Debut: August 16, 1999
- Disbanded: March 26, 2001
- Years active: 1999–2001

The Filthy Animals were a professional wrestling faction in World Championship Wrestling from August 16, 1999 until March 26, 2001.

== Concept ==
The plan for the stable was to be WCW's version of the World Wrestling Federation's D-Generation X. Instead of being strictly villains (heels) or heroes (faces), they were in between (tweeners). They pulled pranks and hijinks on both villains and fan favorites alike. They would steal wallets and mock older wrestlers. They broke into Ric Flair's locker room and stole one of his famous entrance robes, which they took turns wearing and imitating Flair's signature strut and "Wooo!".

== History ==
During a promo on the May 27, 1999 edition of WCW Thunder, Konnan specifically thanked Rey Mysterio Jr., Billy Kidman, and Kevin Nash for watching his back. Mentioning that some people thought the young WCW stars weren't "good enough," Konnan stated they were "filthy animals" and were out for new and old blood.

The Filthy Animals were officially named so on the August 16, 1999 edition of WCW Monday Nitro, as Mean Gene Okerlund interviewed Billy Kidman in the ring, with Kidman stating a new group of friends (Kidman, Rey Mysterio Jr., Eddie Guerrero, and Konnan) were "just a bunch of filthy animals" who hung out both on and off camera. In the weeks prior, the group had started teaming to combat the Dead Pool stable of Vampiro, Raven, and the Insane Clown Posse. They later mainly feuded with The Revolution, which was composed of Chris Benoit, Dean Malenko, Shane Douglas and Perry Saturn.

Eddie Guerrero invented some of his more memorable shticks while with the Filthy Animals, including his famous fake chair knock out (he would knock his opponent out with a chair while the referee was distracted, then drape the chair on their unconscious body, and pretend to be knocked out himself, usually with the referee turning around just in time to see his opponent waking up wondering why they were holding a chair and getting disqualified. Eddie would, from time to time, open one eye to peek or wink to the crowd and gesture them to "shhhh!").

== Members ==
- First incarnation:
  - Active: 1999
  - Members: Konnan, Rey Mysterio Jr., Billy Kidman, Eddie Guerrero, and Torrie Wilson (valet)
- Second incarnation:
  - Active: 1999–2000
  - Members: Konnan and Rey Mysterio Jr.
- Third incarnation:
  - Active: 2000
  - Members: Konnan, Rey Mysterio Jr., Juventud Guerrera and Disco Inferno/Hip Hop Inferno/Disqo
- Fourth incarnation:
  - Active: 2000
  - Members: Konnan, Rey Mysterio Jr., Juventud Guerrera, Disco Inferno/Hip Hop Inferno/Disqo and Tygress (valet)
- Fifth incarnation:
  - Members: Konnan, Rey Mysterio Jr., Juventud Guerrera, Billy Kidman and Tygress (valet)
- Sixth incarnation:
  - Active: 2000–2001
  - Members: Konnan, Rey Mysterio Jr., Billy Kidman, and Tygress (valet)
- Seventh incarnation:
  - Active: 2001
  - Members: Konnan, Rey Mysterio Jr. and Billy Kidman

== Championships and accomplishments ==
- World Championship Wrestling
  - WCW Cruiserweight Championship (3 times) – Mysterio (2), Kidman (1)
  - WCW World Tag Team Championship (4 times) – Mysterio and Kidman (1), Mysterio and Konnan (1), Mysterio and Juventud Guerrera (1), Konnan and Kidman (1)
  - WCW Cruiserweight Tag Team Championship (1 time) – Mysterio and Kidman

== See also ==
- The No Limit Soldiers
- The Mexicools
