= KroniK =

Professional wrestling tag team

Tag team
- Name(s): Kronic; KroniK
- Members: Brian Adams; Bryan Clark
- Billed heights: 6 ft 6 in (1.98 m) - Adams; 6 ft 6 in (1.98 m) - Clark
- Combined billed weight: 573 lb (260 kg)
- Debut: April 16, 2000
- Disbanded: January 19, 2003
- Years active: 2000–2003

KroniK was an American professional wrestling tag team in World Championship Wrestling (WCW), the World Wrestling Federation (WWF) and All Japan Pro Wrestling (AJPW), composed of Brian Adams and Bryan Clark in the early 2000s.

== History ==
=== World Championship Wrestling (2000–2001) ===
Adams and Clark first joined together as a duo in April 2000 in World Championship Wrestling (WCW). Upon joining together as a tag team, KroniK (originally spelled Kronic) assisted Vince Russo in his vision of a clean sweep for his New Blood alliance at the 2000 Spring Stampede pay-per-view. Adams and Clark interfered in the WCW World Tag Team Championship match, allowing the team of Buff Bagwell and Shane Douglas to win the title.

While in WCW, KroniK moved between babyface and heel roles several times - holding the WCW World Tag Team Championship twice. In the final months of WCW, KroniK became hired muscle, adopting the catchphrase "breakin' necks and cashin' checks", similar to the WWF's popular APA tag team. Their contracts were not picked up by the WWF when WCW was sold by AOL Time Warner.

=== World Wrestling Federation (2001) ===
On September 4, 2001, Brian Adams and Bryan Clark each made their re-debut as a World Wrestling Federation (WWF) tag team. Recruited by Stevie Richards, KroniK was called in to settle past differences Richards had with The Undertaker, stemming from the disbanding of Richards' stable, "Right to Censor" earlier that year. KroniK wrestled their first tag team match defeating Kaientai on the September 20, 2001 episode of SmackDown! and their last tag team match for the WWF a few days later at Unforgiven, losing to then WCW Tag Team Champions The Brothers of Destruction (Kane and The Undertaker).

After two dark matches, four appearances on Raw and SmackDown! and a pay-per-view appearance, Clark was released from his contract for being unconditioned and unsafe during their PPV match, while Adams began working for the Heartland Wrestling Association, which served as WWF's developmental territory, for conditioning. Adams requested his release from the WWF in November 2001.

=== WWA, All Japan Pro Wrestling, and retirement (2002–2003) ===
Following their WWF departure, KroniK made appearances for World Wrestling All-Stars, their debut match with promotion taking place at Revolution, defeating the Navajo Warrior and Ghost Walker in less than five minutes.

KroniK then joined All Japan Pro Wrestling in the summer of 2002 during the Pro Wrestling Love era, making an immediate impact by defeating Keiji Mutoh and Taiyo Kea for the AJPW World Tag Team Championship on July 17, 2002.

On the July 20, 2002 edition of AJPW TV, KroniK participated in the Stan Hansen Cup Four Way initiative. KroniK would eliminate the team of George Hines and Johnny Smith, before being eliminated by "Dr. Death" Steve Williams and Mike Rotunda after Williams pinned Adams after delivering the Doctor Bomb. Mike Barton and Jim Steele would go onto win the tournament. Despite KroniK's failure in winning the Stan Hansen Cup, after the match they would cut a confident and rather cocky promo talking about how they were still the AJPW World Tag Team Champions, calling everyone in the initiative "losers", "stupid" and "not smart enough" to be the champions.

KroniK would only make one successful title defense against Barton and Steele on August 30, 2002 as part of a two day pay-per-view. On the second day of the pay-per-view on August 31, KroniK defeated Tomoaki Honma and Yuto Aijima in a non-title match. KroniK was later stripped of the titles in October as they canceled the rest of their appearances in 2002, as Adams suffered a shoulder injury while training for a boxing career.

They returned for the WRESTLE-1 show on January 19, 2003 in what would be KroniK's last match, losing to Keiji Muto and Goldberg. Along with Goldberg, Steve Williams and Mike Rotunda, KroniK left AJPW during a gaijin exodus, which occurred after Mrs. Baba's last appearance behind the scenes in AJPW. In that match, Adams suffered a spinal injury that forced him into retirement, and Clark decided to leave during the exodus. This was also when AJPW's sale finalized, the company having been in the process of being sold in late 2002.

Adams died on August 13, 2007, after mixing the painkiller buprenorphine with the muscle relaxant carisoprodol, as well as the sedatives chlordiazepoxide and alprazolam. Though the Hillsborough County medical examiners determined that each drug was found to be at therapeutic levels, the combination of the drugs together were enough to impede Adams' respiratory system and cause his death.

== Championships and accomplishments ==
- All Japan Pro Wrestling
  - World Tag Team Championship (1 time)
- World Championship Wrestling
  - WCW World Tag Team Championship (2 times)
- Wrestling Observer Newsletter
  - Worst Worked Match of the Year (2001) vs. The Brothers of Destruction at Unforgiven
  - Worst Tag Team (2000, 2001)
