= Lash LeRoux =

American cartoonist and professional wrestler (born 1976)

Personal information
- Born: Mark LeRoux; November 22, 1976 (age 49) Anniston, Alabama, U.S.

Professional wrestling career
- Ring name(s): Corporal Cajun; Lash LeRoux; Mark LeRoux
- Billed height: 5 ft 10 in (178 cm)
- Billed weight: 213 lb (97 kg)
- Billed from: New Orleans, Louisiana
- Trained by: WCW Power Plant
- Debut: July 25, 1998
- Retired: September 1, 2023

Mark LeRoux (born November 22, 1976) is an American cartoonist, caricature artist and retired professional wrestler, better known by his ring name Lash LeRoux. He is best known for his appearances with World Championship Wrestling from the late-1990s to early-2000s.

== Early life ==
LeRoux grew up in Oxford, Alabama. He attended Oxford High School, where he was a junior high state finalist in amateur wrestling in two successive years. In his junior year he came third in the varsity state tournament. LeRoux also played football for the Oxford High Yellow Jackets, and in 1993 his team won the Alabama State Football Championship. After graduating from high school, LeRoux attended Jacksonville State University, studying towards a pre-med degree. He later decided to take a year out in order to focus on his burgeoning career as a cartoonist.

== Professional wrestling career ==
=== World Championship Wrestling (1997–2001) ===
==== Training and early appearances (1997–1999) ====
In 1997 LeRoux saw an advertisement for the WCW Power Plant (the professional wrestling school owned and operated by World Championship Wrestling) on an episode of WCW Monday Nitro. LeRoux qualified to train in the Power Plant, meeting the arduous physical qualifications, and trained throughout 1998, with his first match being a loss to Perry Saturn in mid-1998. He was promoted to the main roster in July 1998, and wrestled on WCW Saturday Night, WCW WorldWide and WCW Thunder as "Mark LeRoux" for several months, often losing squash matches.

==== Cruiserweight Championship pursuits (1999–2000) ====
LeRoux debuted on Nitro on February 1, 1999, as "Lash LeRoux", a take off of Cajun western movie star Lash LaRue, losing to then-Cruiserweight Champion Billy Kidman. It was this match that caught the eyes of WCW officials, and he was signed to an official contract with World Championship Wrestling. LeRoux's character spoke with a broad Cajun accent.

LeRoux competed primarily in the cruiserweight division. He feuded with Disco Inferno over the Cruiserweight Championship, and lost to Disco in a title match at Halloween Havoc 1999. Shortly afterwards, LeRoux and Disco joined forces against the New York gangster Tony Marinara and his henchmen, The Mamalukes, who were owed money by the compulsive gambler Disco. They faced Big Vito and Johnny The Bull in a tag team match at Starrcade 1999, but lost following a miscommunication between the partners. After the match, the unconscious Disco Inferno was carried from the arena inside a body bag and locked in the trunk of a car.

He appeared sporadically on television, teaming with Midnight and pursuing the Cruiserweight Championship once more. He was fired in storyline by WCW President Eric Bischoff in April 2000 for not helping to protect him from Diamond Dallas Page, whose wife Kimberly had betrayed him in order to align herself with Bischoff.

==== Misfits in Action (2000–2001) ====
LeRoux and several other wrestlers who had been fired by the disgruntled President returned several weeks later as the Misfits In Action (M.I.A.), a military-themed stable who were unwilling to align themselves with either the heel New Blood or the face Millionaire's Club. All of the Misfits were given ranks, with LeRoux known as "Corporal Cajun".

The M.I.A. feuded with the New Blood, with LeRoux helping Lieutenant Loco retain his Cruiserweight Championship. LeRoux and Loco won the WCW World Tag Team Championship on October 9, 2000, in Sydney, Australia, defeating New Blood members Mark Jindrak and Sean O'Haire, but lost the belts just minutes later in an instant rematch ordered by commissioner Mike Sanders (also a New Blood member). The M.I.A. also feuded with Team Canada, who had taken possession of the United States Heavyweight Championship and renamed it the "Canadian Heavyweight Championship", during which time M.I.A.'s valet, Major Gunns turned on them and joined Team Canada.

The M.I.A. gradually disbanded in late 2000 and early 2001, with the departure of Loco and Sergeant A.W.O.L. precipitating the end of the stable. On January 23, 2001, the leader of the M.I.A., General Rection, requested LeRoux's M.I.A. shirt, informing him that he had been "honorably discharged". LeRoux began wrestling as Lash LeRoux once more, and returned to the cruiserweight division. His last appearance on WCW television was on the February 19 episode of Nitro, where he challenged United States Champion Rick Steiner and was easily defeated.

=== World Wrestling Federation (2001–2002) ===
Following the purchase of WCW by the World Wrestling Federation in March 2001, LeRoux was signed to a three-year developmental contract by the WWF in April 2001. Along with several other former WCW wrestlers, he was sent to the Heartland Wrestling Association to further his training. LeRoux was released in December 2001, later stating he preferred to pursue other options after it became apparent the WWF had no plans for him in the immediate future.

=== Late career (2002–2006) ===
LeRoux appeared on the inaugural Total Nonstop Action Wrestling pay-per-view on June 19, 2002, competing in the Gauntlet for the Gold where he was eliminated by Jeff Jarrett. The following week, LeRoux suffered a neck injury while working on the independent circuit, and was initially told that he needed surgery. He consulted a second doctor, however, and underwent seven months of physical rehabilitation without surgery until his neck healed. From April to July 2004, LeRoux travelled south to Orlando, Florida and appeared occasionally on TNA's secondary television show Xplosion.

LeRoux also competed for a number of independent promotions, including Georgia Championship Wrestling and NWA Wrestle Birmingham and made a number of appearances in Deep South Wrestling. He retired from wrestling in 2006.

=== Retirement (2006–present) ===
LeRoux has also worked as a cartoonist, and his work has been featured in multiple publications and websites including Pro Wrestling Illustrated and The Wrestler. During his tenure in WCW, he drew a series of single-panel comics for WCW Magazine called Lashing Out.

After retiring from professional wrestling, LeRoux became a pastor.

LeRoux returned for a match on September 1, 2023 losing to Joey Janela at Game Changer Wrestling.

== Personal life ==
LeRoux has two brothers, older brother Joseph and younger brother James, and younger twin sisters, Terri and Sherri Creswell. LeRoux married his high school sweetheart, Elizabeth, on December 22, 1997.

LeRoux is close friends with fellow WCW alumni and Misfits In Action stablemates Bill DeMott and Chavo Guerrero Jr., and Jerry Tuite (until Tuite's death). Growing up, LeRoux was a fan of Ric Flair, Hulk Hogan, Bob Armstrong, Arn Anderson, and the Four Horsemen.

LeRoux is Christian.

== Championships and accomplishments ==
- Pro Wrestling Illustrated
  - PWI ranked him #111 of the top 500 best singles wrestlers in the PWI 500 in 2000
- World Championship Wrestling
  - WCW World Tag Team Championship (1 time) - with Lieutenant Loco

== See also ==
- The Misfits in Action
