= Misfits in Action =

Professional wrestling stable

The Misfits in Action

Stable
- Members: See below
- Debut: 2000
- Disbanded: 2001

The Misfits in Action (MIA) were a stable in World Championship Wrestling (WCW) formed in 2000. They had the shortest reign for the now-retired WCW World Tag Team Championship, which was held by Corporal Cajun and Lieutenant Loco.

== History ==
The original Misfits stable was started on the April 17, 2000, episode of WCW Monday Nitro when Eric Bischoff berated a crew of wrestlers including Hugh Morrus, Lash LeRoux, Chavo Guerrero Jr., and Booker T along with Bam Bam Bigelow (who remained heel) and Jerry Flynn (on his last appearance on WCW TV) for not helping the New Blood dispatch the Millionaire's Club.

On the April 26, 2000, episode of WCW Thunder, LeRoux, Guerrero, Morrus, and Van Hammer saved Booker T after his match against Mike Awesome during a beatdown by Awesome and Scott Steiner. The following week, Leroux, Hammer, and Guerrero made the save for Morrus on the May 1, 2000, episode of WCW Monday Nitro to solidify their alliance. Immediately after the match, an enraged Bischoff fired Morrus and the three men who made the save.

Shortly after, the "released" wrestlers reappeared in WCW under their new M.I.A. names. Despite the obvious fraud, they signed new contracts with their new names, allowing themselves to evade Bischoff's firings.

The returning group initially consisted of Morrus as Captain/General Hugh G. Rection, Guerrero as Lt. Loco, LeRoux as Cpl. Cajun, and Van Hammer as Major Stash. They were given a valet in former fitness model Tylene Buck, who went under the name Major Gunns. The group mainly feuded with The Filthy Animals, Team Canada, and The Natural Born Thrillers. Gunns feuded with the Filthy Animals' valet Tygress. Other members were added as the group's popularity rose over the final years of the company. In July 2000, Hammer was released from WCW. On the July 26, 2000, episode of WCW Thunder, The Wall would be added as Sgt. AWOL. On the November 13, 2000, episode of WCW Monday Nitro, Gunns eventually betrayed the group in favor of turning heel by joining Team Canada, when she threw in the towel on the behalf of Rection, costing him the WCW United States Heavyweight Championship against Lance Storm. The group disbanded in January 2001.

== Members ==
- Captain/General Hugh G. Rection – Hugh Morrus (leader)
- G.I. Bro – Booker T (former leader) (joined on May 24, 2000 and leaves group on June 19, 2000, and promotes Captain Rection to General Rection)
- Private/Major Stash – Van Hammer (released from WCW in July 2000)
- Major Gunns – nWo Girl Tylene (leaves group on November 13, 2000, when she threw in the towel on behalf of Rection during the WCW United States Heavyweight Championship match between General Rection and Lance Storm and joined Team Canada)
- Lt. Loco – Chavo Guerrero Jr. (leaves group in November 2000)
- Sgt. AWOL – The Wall
- Cpl. Cajun – Lash LeRoux

== Championships and accomplishments ==
- World Championship Wrestling
  - WCW Cruiserweight Championship (1 time) – Lt. Loco
  - WCW United States Heavyweight Championship (2 times) – General Rection
  - WCW World Tag Team Championship (1 time) – Cpl. Cajun and Lt. Loco

== See also ==
- The First Family (professional wrestling)
