= Canada national football team =

Canada national football team may refer to:

== Association football ==
- Canada men's national soccer team, which represents Canada in association football
- Canada women's national soccer team, which represents Canada in association football

== Gridiron football ==
- Canada men's national football team, which represents Canada in international gridiron football competitions
- Canada women's national American football team, which represents Canada in international gridiron football competitions

== Rugby ==
- Canada national rugby league team, which represents Canada in rugby league football, nicknamed the Wolverines
- Canada national rugby union team, which represents Canada at rugby union football

== Australian rules football ==
- Canada national Australian rules football team, which represents Canada at Australian rules football team

== See also ==
- Canada national soccer team (disambiguation)
- Canada national beach soccer team
- Canada national team (disambiguation)
