= WCW Sin =

2001 World Championship Wrestling pay-per-view event

Sin
- Promotional poster featuring Sting, Scott Steiner, Goldberg, and Diamond Dallas Page
- Promotion: World Championship Wrestling
- Date: January 14, 2001
- City: Indianapolis, Indiana
- Venue: Conseco Fieldhouse
- Attendance: 6,617
- Buy rate: 80,000

Pay-per-view chronology
← Previous; Starrcade	Next → SuperBrawl Revenge

Sin was a professional wrestling pay-per-view (PPV) event produced by World Championship Wrestling (WCW). It took place on January 14, 2001, from the Conseco Fieldhouse in Indianapolis, Indiana. Sin replaced WCW's January PPV event, Souled Out, which was held from 1997 to 2000.

The main event was for the WCW World Heavyweight Championship between Scott Steiner, Sid Vicious, Jeff Jarrett, and a mystery man that turned out to be Animal in a Four Corners match. The WCW champion heading into Sin was Scott Steiner, who retained the title after pinning Sid Vicious, who had fractured his leg after attempting an aerial attack. The main match on the undercard was between Totally Buff (Lex Luger and Buff Bagwell) and Goldberg and DeWayne Bruce, in a match where if Goldberg lost, he would be (kayfabe) forced to leave WCW. Totally Buff won the match when Lex Luger pinned Goldberg after a Buff Blockbuster from Bagwell with Goldberg on Luger's shoulders. As a result, Goldberg was forced to leave WCW. The rights to WCW Sin have belonged to the World Wrestling Federation (WWF; now WWE) since March 2001.

== Storylines ==
The event featured wrestlers from pre-existing scripted feuds and storylines. Wrestlers portrayed villains, heroes, or less distinguishable characters in the scripted events that built tension and culminated in a wrestling match or series of matches.

The main feud heading into Sin, was between Scott Steiner and Sid Vicious. This feud began in November, when Vicious made his return to WCW after a 5-month absence. The feud began the weeks prior to Starrcade, when Vicious was announced as the number one contender for Steiner's WCW World Heavyweight Championship. In the main event at Starrcade, Steiner would retain his WCW World title against Vicious. However, Vicious managed to earn another championship match against Steiner at Sin, in a Four Corners match pitting himself against Steiner, Jeff Jarrett, and a mystery fourth man. On the edition of January 10 of Thunder Vicious defeated Steiner by disqualification, in a match contested for the WCW World title, thus Steiner retaining.

The secondary feud heading in to Sin, was between Goldberg and the team of Totally Buffed (Lex Luger and Buff Bagwell), and was intertwined with a feud between Goldberg and Vince Russo, who was no longer working for the company at this point. On the September 25, 2000 edition of Nitro, Goldberg inadvertently allowed Russo to become WCW World Heavyweight Champion when he speared Russo through a steel cage during his match with then-champion Booker T. Russo, as punishment, issued an ultimatum to Goldberg. In order to keep his job with WCW, he would have to duplicate his legendary undefeated streak from when he first joined the company back in 1997. If he was able to do so he would receive a shot at the world title, but any loss would result in his immediate termination. At Mayhem in November 2000, Goldberg faced and defeated Luger with his Jackhammer finisher despite Luger shoving the referee into the path of a Goldberg spear to try and get him disqualified. The two men had a rematch at Starrcade in December, where Goldberg won again despite interference from Bagwell on Luger's behalf. Bagwell then attacked Goldberg postmatch, turning on the fans and joining up with the villainous Luger with whom he had just recently been feuding. Shortly after forming the team, Totally Buffed made another effort to force Goldberg into retirement. DeWayne Bruce, a lower-card wrestler who became one of the trainers at WCW's Power Plant wrestling school, stepped up to assist his student Goldberg and both sides agreed to a tag team match at Sin.

== Event ==
Other on-screen personnel
Role:	Name:
Commentators	Tony Schiavone
Commentators	Scott Hudson
Interviewers	Gene Okerlund
Interviewers	Mike Tenay
Referees	Mark Johnson
Referees	Scott James
Referees	Jamie Dugger
Referees	Charles Robinson
Referees	Billy Silverman
Referees	Mickie Jay
Referees	Jim Duggan
Ring announcers	Michael Buffer (Main event)
Ring announcers	David Penzer

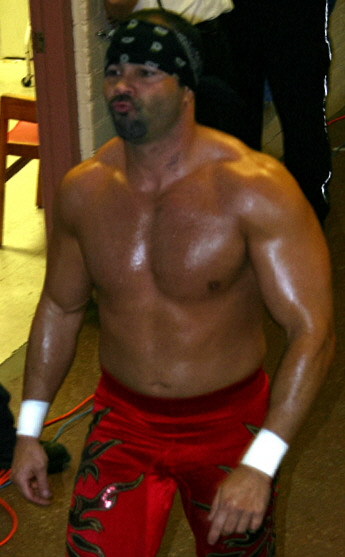
Chavo Guerrero Jr., who defended the WCW Cruiserweight Championship at Sin

The first match that aired was between Chavo Guerrero Jr. and Shane Helms for the WCW Cruiserweight Championship. A back and forth match between the two, as Helms would try to execute the "Nightmare on Helms Street" on Guerrero, while Guerrero would try to execute his brainbuster. After two consecutive reversals, Guerrero would successfully execute the brainbuster on Helms then covering him for the successful pinfall, thus retaining the WCW Cruiserweight Championship.

A video aired from earlier in the day, where Mike Tenay asked then-WCW CEO, Ric Flair, who was getting out of his limo, on who the "mystery opponent" is in the four corners match later in the event. Flair responded by saying the identity of the "mystery opponent" had to be kept confidential and "will rock Scott Steiner's world". Then Gene Okerlund interviewed The Mamalukes, followed by Reno and Big Vito discussing their match and how everything would be "finished once and for all". The second match was between Reno and Big Vito. The match began in a brawl, leading to Big Vito in control. Reno attempted to hit his "Roll the Dice" on Vito, but was countered, leading to a successful second attempt where then after, Reno covered Big Vito for the victory.

The third match was a cruiserweight tag team match between The Jung Dragons and Jamie Knoble with Evan Karagias. The match started out fast with chops and Irish whips from both teams. However the Jung Dragons took control of the match, until the climax of the match, where Karagias gave Yang a hangman's neckbreaker. After Knoble delivered a piledriver to Kaz, Yang unsuccessfully attempted a corkscrew moonsault on Knoble, but ended up pinning Knoble with an inside cradle for the win. After the match, Knoble and Karagias assault the Jung Dragons.

The fourth match was between Ernest Miller and WCW Commissioner Mike Sanders, in a match where the WCW Commissionership and Ms. Jones' managing services were on the line. Both Miller and Sanders gained control in the course of the match. In the climax, the Thrillers came to interfere on Sanders behalf, but as they came to the ring, KroniK came after them interfering on Miller's behalf. Miller then performed a Feliner on Sanders followed by the pin, winning the match, Ms. Jones, and the WCW Commissioner job title.

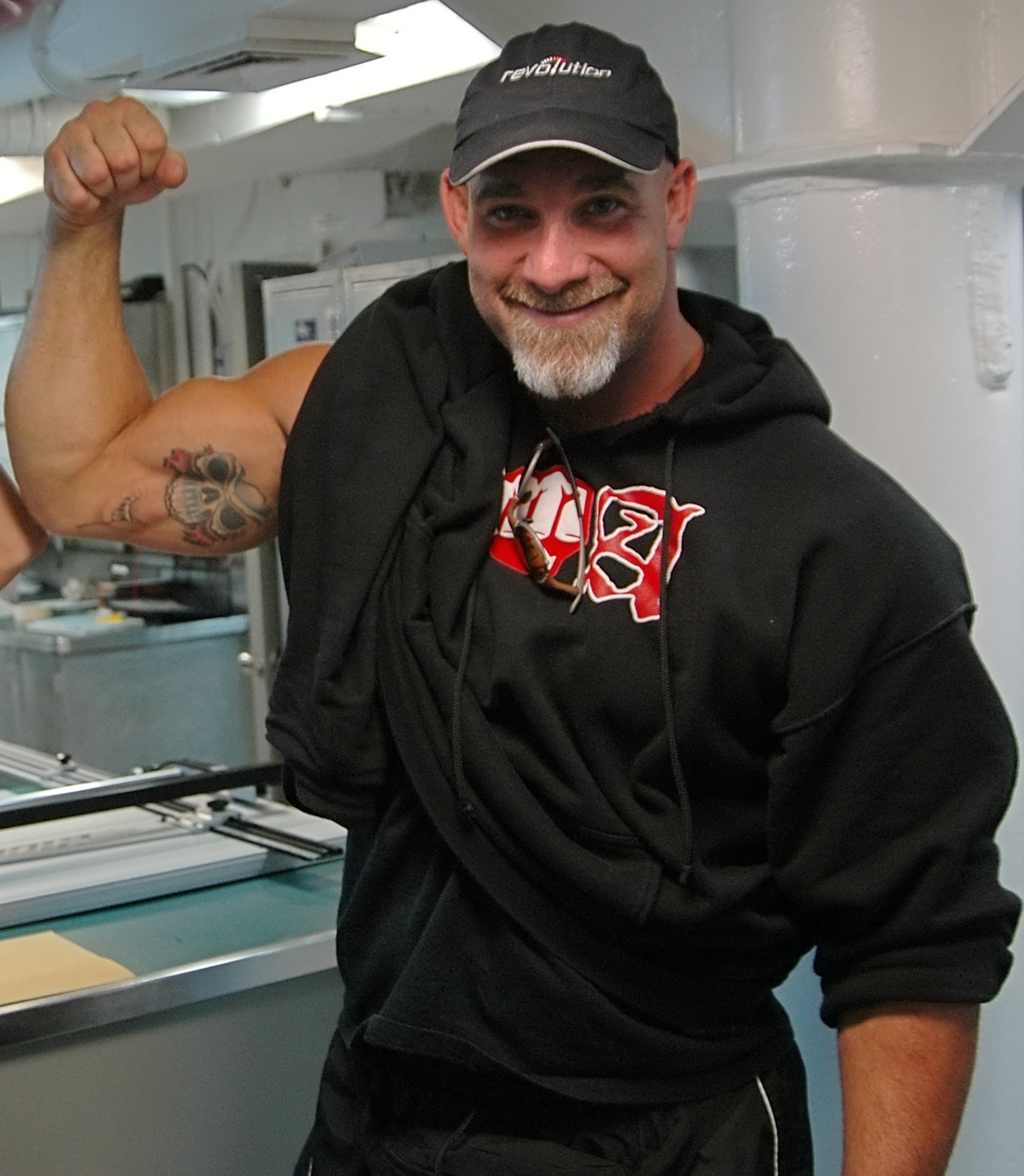
Goldberg, who was (kayfabe) forced to leave WCW after losing a tag team match to Totally Buffed at Sin

Backstage, Goldberg and then-WCW CEO Ric Flair watched Totally Buffed's arrival followed by "Mean" Gene Okerlund interviewing Jeff Jarrett. The fifth match then got underway between Team Canada (Lance Storm, Mike Awesome and Elix Skipper) defeating The Filthy Animals (Konnan, Rey Mysterio Jr. and Billy Kidman) with Jim Duggan as Special Guest Referee in a Penalty Box match, where if one broke a rule they were sent into the Penalty Box for one minute. The match started off with Rey Misterio Jr. in control as Elix Skipper and Mike Awesome were sent into the Penalty Box after breaking the rules of the match. Midway though the match, Awesome and Lance Storm were sent into the penalty box after performing a double-team move. But then after, Team Canada was in control of the match after Misterio and Kidman were sent into the Penalty Box, after Duggan thought they were about to perform a low blow on Awesome. After Konnan, Awesome, and Skipper were sent into the Penalty box, Storm applied the Maple Leaf on Kidman forcing him to submit, thus winning for Team Canada.

The sixth match was between Meng, Crowbar and WCW Hardcore Champion Terry Funk in a Triple Threat match for the WCW Hardcore Championship. The match started out with Crowbar hitting Funk with a steel chair, and then dragging him backstage, where Meng joined the two men in the brawl using a variety of weapons. In the climax of the match, Crowbar applied a figure four leglock on Funk which was broken up by Meng who was then attacked by Funk and Meng with steel chairs. Meng then superkicked a chair into Crowbar's face followed by making Funk submit to the Tongan Death Grip to win the WCW Hardcore Championship.

The seventh match was contested between Sean O'Haire, Chuck Palumbo and The Insiders (Kevin Nash and Diamond Dallas Page) in a WCW World Tag Team Championship match, with the stipulation of the Insiders able to make substitutions. The match began with then-WCW CEO Ric Flair sending The Natural Born Thrillers backstage, banning substitutions in the match, upsetting Palumbo and O' Haire. In the climax of the match, Shawn Stasiak interfered, keeping DDP busy on the outside. Buff Bagwell and Lex Luger then interfered in the match by hitting Nash with a wrench, leading to O'Haire hitting a Seanton Bomb on Nash and covering him for the win and the WCW World Tag Team Championship.

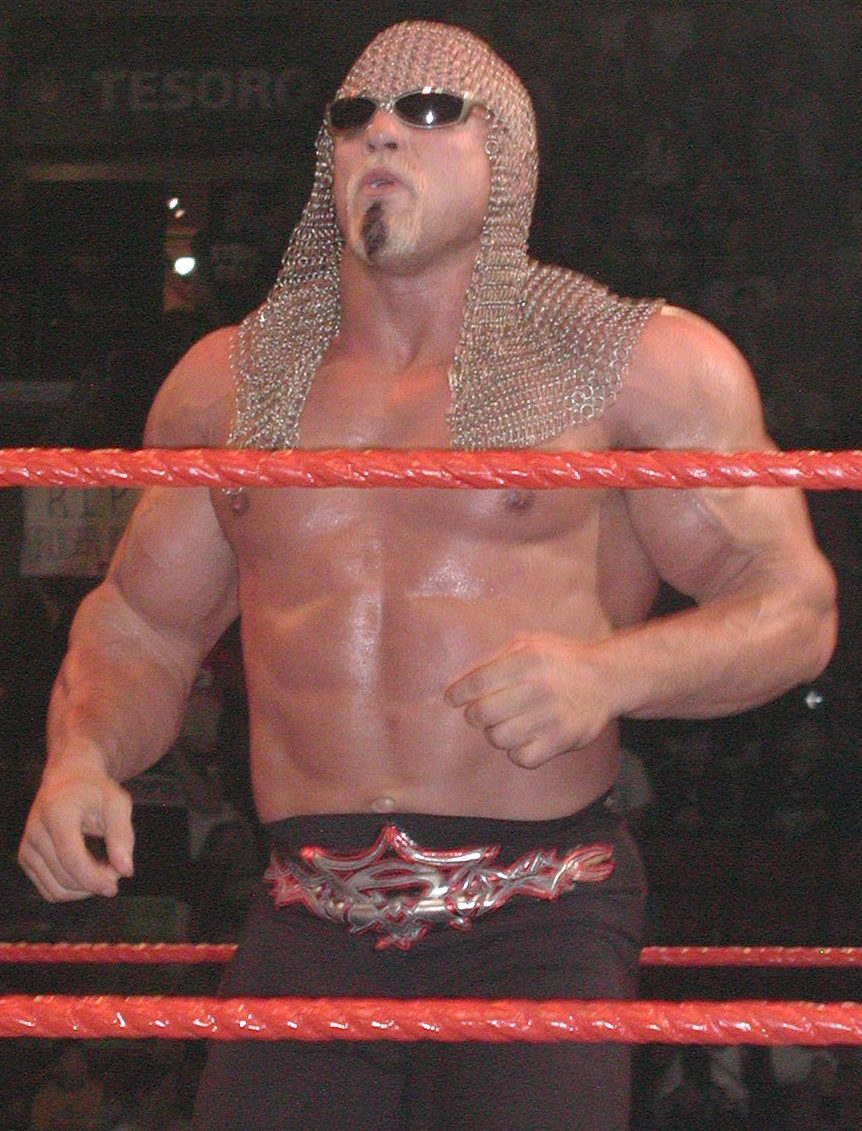
Scott Steiner, the WCW World Heavyweight Champion entering Sin

The eight match was between Shane Douglas and General Rection in a First Blood Chain match for the WCW United States Heavyweight Championship. The match began with Rection in control, as he and Douglas attempted to retrieve the chain. Afterwards, Douglas worked on the legs of Rection for a period of time until Rection recovered and gained control. In a turn of events, Rection was pushed off a ladder by Douglas, which knocked down the referee, and he pulled out a chain from his boots and attacked Rection with it. As the referee recovered, Rection began to bleed and was seen by the referee who called for the bell, declaring Shane Douglas the winner and new WCW United States Champion.

The ninth match, and the main match on the undercard, was between Totally Buffed (Lex Luger and Buff Bagwell) and Goldberg with DeWayne Bruce in a No Disqualification tag-team match, where if Goldberg lost, he would be (kayfabe) forced to leave WCW. The match started out with Goldberg against Bagwell, where Goldberg had full control of the match. Bruce was then tagged in by Goldberg where he gained an early advantage over Bagwell for a short time, but was then double teamed by Totally Buffed. Goldberg was then tagged in, where Bagwell gained the upper-hand. Luger then exited the ring and walked up to a fan, who asked for Goldberg's autograph earlier in the event. This distracted and lured Goldberg near the fan, who sprayed mace into Goldberg's eyes. Luger then lifted Goldberg on his shoulders and Bagwell hit a Super Blockbuster. Luger covered him for the victory, thus ending Goldberg's undefeated streak of thirty-five victories and forcing him to leave WCW.

The main event was between Sid Vicious, Jeff Jarrett, Scott Steiner, and a "mystery opponent" for the WCW World Heavyweight Championship in a Four Corners match. The match began with only three competitors, without the mystery opponent. Vicious gained the advantage over Jarrett and Steiner in the start of the match, but was then double-teamed by Jarrett and Steiner. As Vicious was making a comeback, he attempted a jumping big boot from the second turnbuckle; he suffered a compound fracture of his lower left leg upon landing on the ring mat and collapsed to the ground, unable to move. The footage of the injury was edited out of the WWE Network version of the event. Towards the end of the match, then-WCW CEO Flair announced the arrival of the "mystery opponent", who came out wearing a mask, hiding his identity. He entered the ring delivering a couple of kicks to Vicious. Steiner then covered Vicious for the victory, thus successfully retaining the WCW World Heavyweight Championship. After the match ended, the "mystery man" unmasked and revealed himself to be Road Warrior Animal, making his return to WCW after leaving with his longtime tag team partner Road Warrior Hawk in 1996.

== Aftermath ==
Because of the injury to Sid Vicious, the broadcast ended early shortly after Road Warrior Animal was revealed as the mystery man and a crucial angle was not shown until the following night's edition of Nitro. After the main event, Ric Flair celebrated the events of the night with the other participants in the main event, along with Totally Buffed and the Natural Born Thrillers, and revealed that every single one of the events in their matches were part of a conspiracy. On Nitro, Flair revealed an alliance involving himself, Bagwell, Luger, Jarrett, and Steiner. The group immediately began feuding with The Insiders and Rick Steiner, only to have Rick join the group when he betrayed Kevin Nash.

Almost immediately after winning the WCW Hardcore Championship, Meng left WCW after being with the company for six years. He would make an unexpected appearance at the Royal Rumble a week later, thus returning to the WWF under his former ring name Haku.

Sin would be the final WCW pay-per-view to be held outside of the southern United States. Starting in February 2001, all WCW events were held in the southern states only until it was sold to WWE in March 2001.

== Reception ==
In 2007, Arnold Furious of 411Mania gave the event a rating of 4.5 [Poor], stating, "The undercard has so much hard work in it. Two great cruiserweight matches in the first half and a solid hardcore match. Basically everyone who had the chance to move up the card tried really hard. Then the main event guys strolled out there and dogged it in matches riddled with stupid booking. Sid broke his leg, Goldberg is out of WCW forever. Earlier on Steiner had taken out most of the WCW’s babyfaces. There’s really only Nash and DDP left and they just jobbed to a couple of rookie midcarders."

== Results ==
No.	Results	Stipulations	Times
1	Chavo Guerrero Jr. (c) defeated Shane Helms by pinfall	Singles match for the WCW Cruiserweight Championship	11:14
2	Reno defeated Big Vito by pinfall	Singles match	08:41
3	The Jung Dragons (Kaz Hayashi and Yun Yang) (with Leia Meow) defeated Evan Karagias and Jamie Knoble by pinfall	Tag team match	09:21
4	Ernest Miller (with Ms. Jones) defeated Mike Sanders by pinfall	Singles match	05:44
5	Team Canada (Elix Skipper, Lance Storm and Mike Awesome) (with Major Gunns) defeated The Filthy Animals (Billy Kidman, Konnan and Rey Mysterio Jr.) (with Tygress) by submission	Penalty Box match with Jim Duggan as special guest referee	13:07
6	Meng defeated Crowbar (with Daffney) and Terry Funk (c) by submission	Triple Threat Hardcore match for the WCW Hardcore Championship	11:41
7	The Natural Born Thrillers (Chuck Palumbo and Sean O'Haire) (with Mike Sanders) defeated The Insiders (Diamond Dallas Page and Kevin Nash) (c) by pinfall	Tag team match for the WCW World Tag Team Championship	11:16
8	Shane Douglas defeated Gen. Rection (c)	First Blood Chain match for the WCW United States Heavyweight Championship	11:36
9	Totally Buffed (Lex Luger and Buff Bagwell) defeated Goldberg and DeWayne Bruce by pinfall	No Disqualification match Since he lost, Goldberg was forced to leave WCW.	11:53
10	Scott Steiner (c) (with Midajah) defeated Jeff Jarrett, Sid Vicious and Road Warrior Animal by pinfall	Four corners match for the WCW World Heavyweight Championship	07:53
(c) / – the champion(s) heading into the match
