= Canada national soccer team =

Canada national soccer team may refer to:

- Canada men's national soccer team
  - Canada men's national under-23 soccer team, Canada's Olympic men's soccer team
  - Canada men's national under-20 soccer team
  - Canada men's national under-17 soccer team
- Canada women's national soccer team
  - Canada women's national under-20 soccer team
  - Canada women's national under-17 soccer team

== See also ==
- Canada national beach soccer team
- Canada national football team (disambiguation)
- Canadian national team (disambiguation)
