= New Blood Rising =

2000 World Championship Wrestling pay-per-view event

- Promotional poster featuring Vampiro
- Promotion: World Championship Wrestling
- Date: August 13, 2000
- City: Vancouver, British Columbia
- Venue: Pacific Coliseum
- Attendance: 6,614
- Buy rate: 85,000
- Tagline: Our Time is Now

Pay-per-view chronology
← Previous; Bash at the Beach	Next → Fall Brawl

New Blood Rising was a professional wrestling pay-per-view (PPV) event produced by World Championship Wrestling (WCW). It took place on August 13, 2000 from the Pacific Coliseum in Vancouver, British Columbia. The name is a reference to the New Blood faction within WCW. The event replaced WCW's August PPV event Road Wild held from 1996 to 1999 and was held on a Sunday instead of a Saturday. Despite never being announced before or during the show, every match on the card was contested under no disqualification rules.

== Storylines ==
The event featured wrestlers from pre-existing scripted feuds and storylines. Wrestlers portrayed villains, heroes, or less distinguishable characters in the scripted events that built tension and culminated in a wrestling match or series of matches.

== Event ==
Other on-screen personnel
Role:	Name:
Commentators	Tony Schiavone
Commentators	Scott Hudson
Commentators	Mark Madden
Interviewer	Pamela Paulshock
Referees	Mickie Jay
Referees	Mark Johnson
Referees	Charles Robinson
Referees	Billy Silverman
Referees	Jamie Tucker
Ring announcers	Michael Buffer
Ring announcers	David Penzer

The match between Buff Bagwell and Chris Kanyon was originally slated to have Bagwell's real-life mother Judy suspended above the ring on a pole. However, she was placed on a forklift, as Kanyon claimed there was not a pole big enough to hold her as a joke about her weight. During the match, David Arquette made a one-night return to WCW, aligning himself with Kanyon and attacking Bagwell.

The match between Miss Hancock and Major Gunns ended when Hancock began clutching her stomach, in an implied miscarriage, allowing Gunns to pin her. Hancock's storyline boyfriend David Flair came to her aid and she was helped to the back in a worked shoot (an event in professional wrestling which is scripted but designed to appear unscripted).

The match between Kevin Nash, Goldberg, and Scott Steiner was marked by another worked shoot incident. Goldberg did not enter the match until it was partially completed, which the commentators stated was the result of a motorcycle accident. After Goldberg arrived, Nash attempted to perform the Jackknife Powerbomb on him, but Goldberg pushed himself off. This was treated as a break from the script and an unprofessional act by Goldberg, and Goldberg was involved in a televised argument with Vince Russo, who had been acknowledged on-screen as the company's booker. In storyline, Nash and Steiner improvised an ending to the match in which Steiner would take Nash's finishing move; the commentators lauded Steiner for his professionalism.

== Reception ==
In 2007, Arnold Furious of 411Mania gave the event a rating of 2.5 [Very Bad], stating, "One good spotfest, nothing else doing. Fire Russo *clap clap clapclapclap*. It’s now gotten to the point where I can’t watch any more shows Russo has booked. So this is my final WCW flashback. I was planning on going all the way through but it’s such a waste of my time and energy and it’s so depressing I think I’ll do something else instead. Anything else. Thanks for the memories WCW…rot in hell."

== Results ==
No.	Results	Stipulations	Times
1	3 Count (Evan Karagias, Shannon Moore, and Shane Helms) (with Tank Abbott) defeated The Jung Dragons (Kaz Hayashi, Jamie-San, and Yun Yang)	Gold Record Ladder match	11:32
2	Ernest Miller defeated The Great Muta	Singles match	06:47
3	Buff Bagwell defeated Chris Kanyon	Judy Bagwell on a Forklift match	06:45
4	KroniK (Brian Adams and Bryan Clark) (c) defeated The Perfect Event (Shawn Stasiak and Chuck Palumbo), Sean O'Haire and Mark Jindrak, and The Misfits In Action (Gen. Rection and Corporal Cajun)	Four Corners match for the WCW World Tag Team Championship with The Filthy Animals as special guest referees	12:22
5	Billy Kidman defeated Shane Douglas (with Torrie Wilson)	Strap match	08:22
6	Major Gunns defeated Ms. Hancock	Mud Rip off the Clothes match	06:43
7	Sting defeated The Demon	Singles match	00:52
8	Lance Storm (c) defeated Mike Awesome	Canadian Rules match for the WCW United States Heavyweight Championship with Jacques Rougeau as special guest enforcer Rules were arbitrarily changed by Storm during the match.	11:28
9	The Dark Carnival (Vampiro and The Great Muta) defeated KroniK (Brian Adams and Bryan Clark) (c)	Tag team match for the WCW World Tag Team Championship	09:06
10	Kevin Nash defeated Goldberg and Scott Steiner	Three-way match	10:48
11	Booker T (c) defeated Jeff Jarrett	Singles match for the WCW World Heavyweight Championship	14:54
(c) / – the champion(s) heading into the match

*The altered rules were as follows: instead of a traditional three-count, the referee must administer a five-count. Following the five-count, the competitor has to stay down for ten seconds. If both men are down for a ten-count for any reason, the first man who gets to his feet wins the match. In addition, there are no submissions and no count-outs.

== See also ==
- Professional wrestling in Canada
