= Vengeance (2003) =

World Wrestling Entertainment pay-per-view event

- Promotional poster featuring The Undertaker
- Promotion: World Wrestling Entertainment
- Brand: SmackDown!
- Date: July 27, 2003
- City: Denver, Colorado
- Venue: Pepsi Center
- Attendance: 9,500
- Buy rate: 365,000

Pay-per-view chronology
← Previous; Bad Blood	Next → SummerSlam

Vengeance chronology
← Previous; 2002	Next → 2004

The 2003 Vengeance was a professional wrestling pay-per-view (PPV) event produced by World Wrestling Entertainment (WWE). It was the third annual Vengeance and took place on July 27, 2003, at the Pepsi Center in Denver, Colorado. It was held exclusively for wrestlers from the promotion's SmackDown! brand division, which made it the first brand-exclusive Vengeance after the previous year's event also featured wrestlers from Raw.

Eight professional wrestling matches were scheduled on the event's card. The main event was a Triple Threat match for the WWE Championship, in which Kurt Angle defeated reigning champion Brock Lesnar and Big Show to win the championship. Two featured bouts were scheduled on the undercard where WWE Chairman Vince McMahon defeated Zach Gowen and The Undertaker defeated John Cena. The event also saw the reintroduction of the United States Championship—a former title of the defunct World Championship Wrestling (WCW) which came under WWE's ownership after the acquisition of WCW in March 2001 with the title later deactivated that November—reinstated as a WWE title; Eddie Guerrero defeated Chris Benoit in a tournament to win the vacant title.

Vengeance had an attendance of approximately 9,500 and received about 322,000 pay-per-view buys. This event helped WWE increase its pay-per-view revenue by $6.2 million from the previous year.

== Production ==
=== Background ===
Vengeance was an annual professional wrestling pay-per-view (PPV) event produced by World Wrestling Entertainment (WWE) since 2001. The first event was held in December before it moved up to July in 2002. The third Vengeance event was scheduled for July 27, 2003, at the Pepsi Center in Denver, Colorado, thus establishing Vengeance as the promotion's annual July PPV. While the previous year's event featured wrestlers from both the Raw and SmackDown! brands, the 2003 event was held exclusively for SmackDown!, which made it the first brand-exclusive Vengeance.

=== Storylines ===
The event featured nine professional wrestling matches with outcomes predetermined by WWE script writers. The matches featured wrestlers portraying their characters in planned storylines that took place before, during and after the event. All wrestlers were from the SmackDown! brand - a storyline division in which WWE assigned its employees, with storylines produced on the brand's weekly television show, SmackDown!.

The main event at Vengeance featured WWE Champion Brock Lesnar defending the title against Big Show and Kurt Angle in a Triple Threat match. The buildup to the match began four months prior at WrestleMania XIX, where Lesnar defeated Angle and won the WWE Championship, as Angle underwent neck surgery afterwards. Two months later at Judgment Day, Lesnar defeated Big Show in a stretcher match to retain the title. On the May 29 episode of SmackDown!, Big Show teamed up with Chuck Palumbo and Johnny Stamboli and defeated The Undertaker and Brock Lesnar. On the June 5 episode of SmackDown!, Angle returned and Big Show attacked him, but Lesnar came to save him and challenge Big Show to a title match. On the June 12 episode of SmackDown!, during the match between Lesnar and Big Show, the ring collapsed, causing the match to end in a no contest. On the June 19 episode of SmackDown!, the two had a rematch but The World's Greatest Tag Team (Shelton Benjamin and Charlie Haas) attacked Lesnar, making Angle and Mr. America to run for the save, only for Big Show to chokeslam all of them. On the June 26 episode of SmackDown!, the six men fought in a tag match where Big Show pinned Mr. America to win the match for his team. On the July 3 episode of SmackDown!, Lesnar and Angle cost Big Show a handicap match against Stephanie McMahon and Zach Gowen. On the July 10 episode of SmackDown!, Big Show chokeslammed Angle and teamed up with The World's Greatest Tag Team to defeat Lesnar. On the July 17 episode of SmackDown!, Angle defeated The World's Greatest Tag Team and Big Show by help from Zach Gowen. On the July 24 episode of SmackDown!, Gowen teamed with both Lesnar and Angle against Big Show and The World's Greatest Tag Team, and Big Show won for his team by chokeslamming both Lesnar and Angle.

One of the featured preliminary matches was Zach Gowen versus Vince McMahon in a singles match. The hype to this match began on the May 22 episode of SmackDown!, where Gowen, whose left leg was amputated when he was eight years old due to cancer, said that he wanted to wrestle for WWE. McMahon, however, ordered police to arrest him. On the June 5 episode of SmackDown!, McMahon challenged Gowen to get a WWE contract by beating him in an Arm Wrestling contest. On the June 12 episode of SmackDown!, McMahon kicked Gowen's leg in order to win the contest. On the June 26 episode of SmackDown!, McMahon agreed to give Gowen a contract, but only if Gowen joined McMahon's "Kiss My Ass" club. Gowen low blowed McMahon. McMahon attacked Gowen and booked him and Stephanie McMahon against Big Show, with Gowen getting a WWE contract if they won. On the July 3 episode of SmackDown!, Brock Lesnar and Kurt Angle helped Gowen and Stephanie win the match and earn his contract. On the July 10 episode of SmackDown!, while Gowen signed his contract, McMahon made a match between Gowen and himself for Vengeance. On the July 24 episode of SmackDown!, McMahon attacked Gowen during his match with Lesnar and Angle against Big Show and The World's Greatest Tag Team.

The other featured preliminary match was The Undertaker versus John Cena in a singles match. The buildup to the match began on the June 26 episode of SmackDown!, where Cena celebrated a year in WWE. He fought Orlando Jordan and defeated him, but attacked him after the match, making The Undertaker run down for the save. On the July 3 episode of SmackDown!, The Undertaker cost Cena his match against Billy Gunn in a tournament for the reinstated United States Championship (a former title of World Championship Wrestling that was acquired in March 2001 and deactivated that November). On the July 17 episode of SmackDown!, Cena and The Undertaker brawled in the ring. On the July 24 episode of SmackDown!, Cena taunted The Undertaker, rapping about him in a cemetery.

Another preliminary match featured SmackDown! General Manager Stephanie McMahon versus Sable in a singles match. The build up to the match begin on the June 5 episode of SmackDown!, when Stephanie's father Vince McMahon appointed Sable as Stephanie's assistant against her will. Before the Arm Wrestling Contest between Gowen and McMahon on the June 12 episode of SmackDown!, Mr America challenged McMahon to Arm Wrestling Contest instead. Sable flashed her breasts at Mr America causing him to lose against McMahon. Two weeks later on the June 19 episode of SmackDown!, Sable seduced Gowen while in Stephanie's office but dropped her act and berated him claiming he will never get with a real woman like her. McMahon stormed into the office and chased away Gowen and it was revealed to be a set up by McMahon and Sable to fool Gowen. On the July 3 episode of SmackDown!, Sable taunted Stephanie for being in the handicap match with Gowen against Big Show telling Stephanie not to worry as she can handle being General Manager instead of her. Stephanie and Gowen later won the match. On the July 10 episode of SmackDown!, as Gowen was signing his contract to officially become a WWE wrestler, McMahon and Sable interrupted and Sable took the clipboard that had Gowen's contract and hit Stephanie in the head with it. Stephanie attacked Sable backstage and her father ordered the road agents to pull her out of the room. As she was pulled out, McMahon made a match between Stephanie and Sable for Vengeance. The following weeks would see Sable and Stephanie getting into brawls before their match. Once involving a food fight and later a parking lot brawl in which Stephanie ripped Sable's top off exposing her breasts.

Another match featured was Jamie Noble versus Billy Gunn in a singles match. Gunn made his return to WWE on the June 12 episode of SmackDown! defeating A-Train in a singles match. After the match, Torrie Wilson who was the special guest ring announcer begin an on-screen relationship with Gunn and became his valet. The two begin feuding with Noble and his girlfriend Nidia. On the July 10 episode of SmackDown!, they defeated Nidia and Noble in a mixed tag team match. On the July 17 episode of SmackDown!, Noble tried to pay Wilson to spend the night with him causing Nidia to walk out on her boyfriend. This led to Noble losing his match that night to Ultimo Dragon after Torrie and Gunn distracted him. On the July 24 episode of SmackDown!, Gunn defeated Noble after using a swinging Rock Bottom like finisher. After the match, Noble demanded a rematch at Vengeance. Torrie accepted on behalf of Gunn and stipulated if Noble won she would sleep with him the following week on SmackDown!, which Noble agreed with much to Gunn's dismay.

On the July 10 episode of SmackDown!, Billy Kidman and Rey Mysterio defeated the APA, The Basham Brothers and the Full Blooded Italians in a fatal four-way match to become the #1 contenders for the WWE Tag Team Championship at Vengeance.

== Event ==
Other on-screen personnel
Role:	Name:
Commentators	Michael Cole
Commentators	Tazz
Interviewer	Josh Mathews
Ring announcer	Tony Chimel
Referees	Mike Chioda
Referees	Brian Hebner
Referees	Jim Korderas
Referees	Mike Sparks

=== Sunday Night Heat ===
Before the event aired live on pay-per-view, Último Dragón faced Kanyon on Sunday Night Heat, one of WWE's secondary television programs. Dragon won after a standing shiranui on Kanyon.

=== Preliminary matches ===
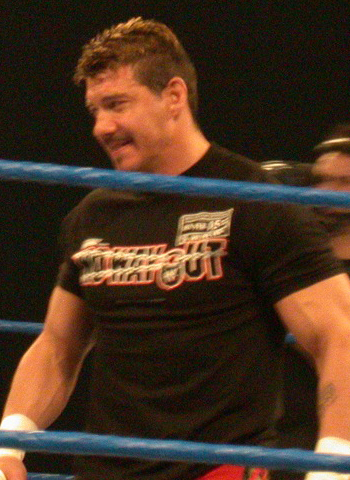
Eddie Guerrero faced Chris Benoit for the vacant WWE United States Championship, which was formerly a World Championship Wrestling title that was reinstated as a WWE title prior to the event.

As the pay-per-view event began, Eddie Guerrero faced Chris Benoit for the vacant WWE United States Championship. The match was contested evenly between both men, with both of them performing a variety of offensive maneuvers. Guerrero eventually gained the upper hand when Rhyno interfered in the match while the referee was unconscious, performing a Gore on Benoit. After this, Guerrero performed a Frog splash on Benoit to win the title.

In the next match, Billy Gunn (with Torrie Wilson) faced Jamie Noble (with Nidia). If Noble won, he'd get to sleep with Torrie. During the match, Noble performed a DDT from the top turnbuckle on Gunn and went for a cover, but Nidia interfered and placed Gunn's foot on the rope. Noble then angrily confronted Nidia. Torrie attempted to slap him, but he instead kissed her. After this, Nidia and Torrie both slapped Noble. Noble returned to the inside of the ring, only to be tripped by Torrie. While confronting her, Gunn attempted a Gunnslinger but Noble pushed him into Torrie. Noble then rolled-up on Gunn to win.

In the third match, Bradshaw, Faarooq, Shannon Moore, Doink the Clown, Brother Love, Nunzio, Matt Hardy, Kanyon, Danny Basham, Doug Basham, the Easter Bunny, Sean O'Haire, John Hennigan, Orlando Jordan, Funaki, Los Conquistadores (Rob Conway and Johnny Jeter), the Brooklyn Brawler, Johnny Stamboli, Chuck Palumbo, Matt Cappotelli, and Spanky fought in the APA Invitational Bar Room Brawl. During the match, Spanky was put through a table, Sean O'Haire used a pool cue and Brother Love threw Shannon Moore through a mirror. After knocking down Brother Love, Bradshaw won the match.

In the next match, The World's Greatest Tag Team (Shelton Benjamin and Charlie Haas) faced Rey Mysterio and Billy Kidman for the WWE Tag Team Championship. Throughout the match, both teams performed many offensive maneuvers. The World's Greatest Tag Team won after a combination of a powerbomb by Haas and a diving lariat to retain the titles.

=== Main event matches ===
In the fifth match Sable faced SmackDown! General Manager Stephanie McMahon in a No Countout Match. Stephanie attacked Sable while she was on the way to the ring, while Sable utilized kicks to take the advantage. Stephanie beat on Sable on the outside before trying to hit her with a steel chair, but the referee stopped her. The match ended when Stephanie tore away at Sable's top, and while Sable was attempting to get referee Brian Hebner to help her, A-Train attacked Stephanie. Hebner then gave Sable his shirt to cover her, and she covered Stephanie for the win.

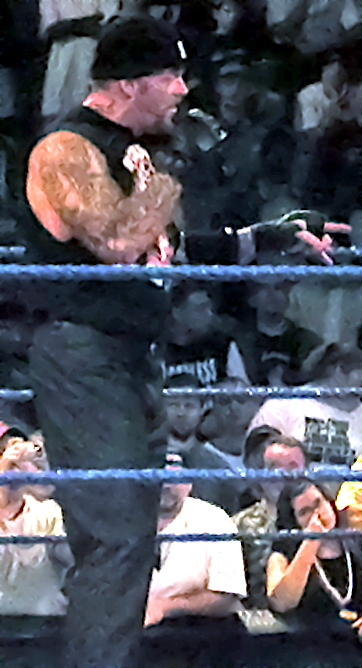
The Undertaker, who faced John Cena at Vengeance.

In the next match, The Undertaker faced John Cena. The Undertaker controlled the start of the match, but Cena took advantage by drinking water and spraying it in the Undertaker's face. The Undertaker regained control by chokeslamming Cena, before an attempt at a Last Ride. Cena reversed into a DDT, however. The Undertaker was thrown into an exposed turnbuckle and Cena attacked his midsection, bloodying him from the mouth, selling internal injuries, or making them appear realistic. The Undertaker later attempted to perform a Tombstone Piledriver but couldn't due to the (kayfabe) injuries he had received. Cena punched him with a chain wrapped around his fist and delivered an FU. Cena then covered the Undertaker, but he kicked out of the attempt. Cena then scaled the turnbuckle to attack the Undertaker in the corner, but the Undertaker performed the Last Ride on him and pinned Cena for the win.

In the next match, WWE Chairman Mr. McMahon faced Zach Gowen. McMahon controlled much of the match, attacking Gowen's leg primarily, as Gowen only has one leg. However, Gowen retaliated with such offensive maneuvers as one-legged dropkicks and springboard backflips. Late in the match, McMahon held a steel chair with the intent of hitting Gowen with it. Gowen, however, countered by using a spinning heel kick to kick the chair into McMahon's face, bloodying him. Gowen then went for a Corkscrew Moonsault, but missed and landed on the mat. McMahon then covered Gowen for the win, but after the match, the crowd gave Gowen a standing ovation for his performance.

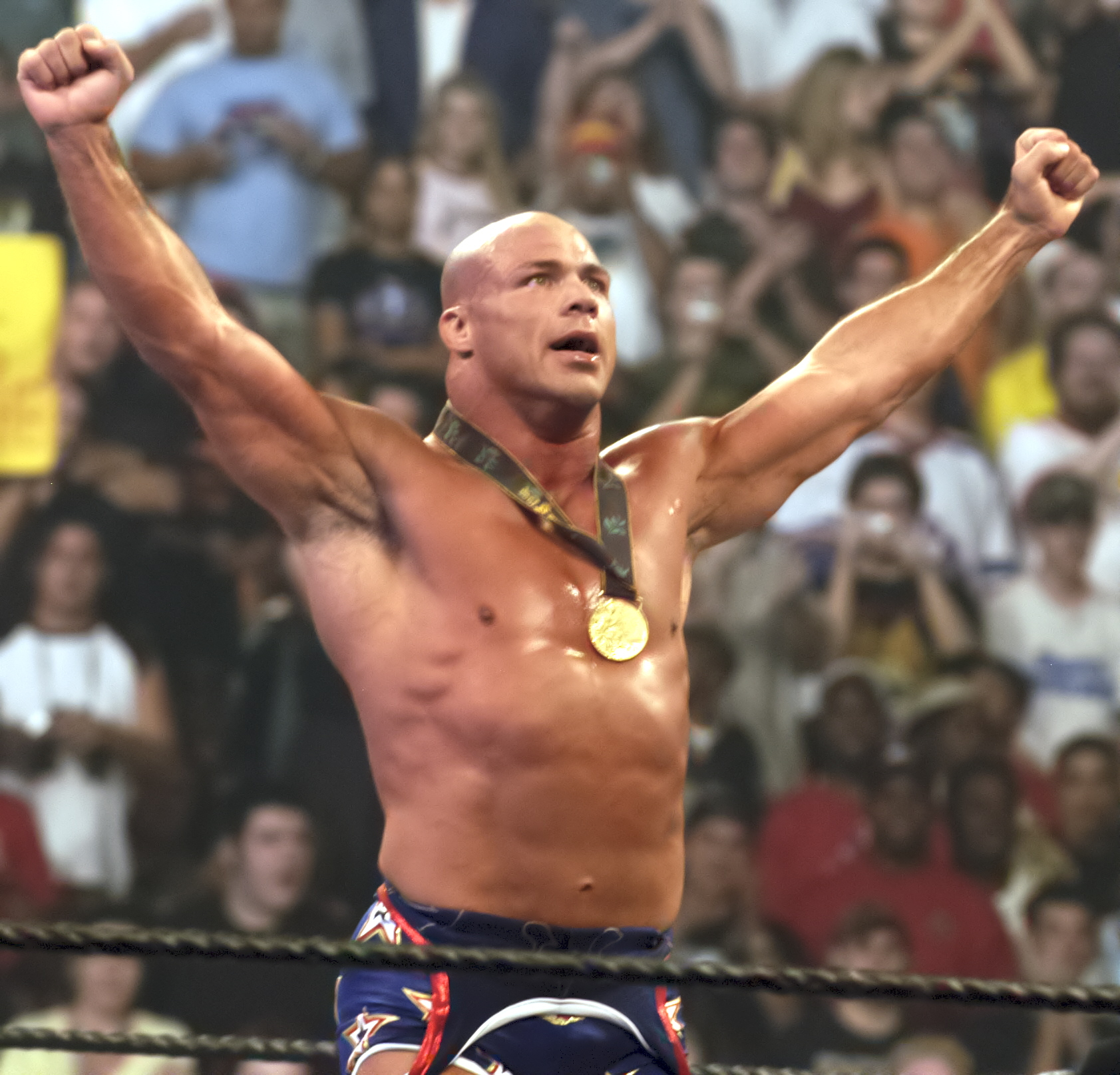
Kurt Angle faced the Big Show and Brock Lesnar for the WWE Championship.

In the main event, Brock Lesnar, Kurt Angle and Big Show fought in a Triple Threat Match for the WWE Championship. The match began with Angle and Lesnar facing each other, before attacking Big Show. Big Show threw Angle outside the ring and chokeslammed Lesnar. He covered Lesnar but didn't score a pinfall. Big Show controlled the match early on before Lesnar shoulder blocked and went for an F5 but Big Show countered. Angle returned to the ring with trash can lids and both he and Lesnar used them against Big Show. Big Show tried to chokeslam both men simultaneously, but Angle and Lesnar teamed up to chokeslam Big Show. Later in the match, Angle began to bleed. Big Show placed Lesnar on the top turnbuckle and climbed up to punch Lesnar, but Angle distracted both men and went down to the mat, with Big Show still above him, allowing Lesnar to powerbomb and cover Big Show. Angle broke the cover by hitting Lesnar with a chair to the back, following with a chair shot to the head, bloodying Lesnar, too. Angle and Big Show proceeded to fight outside the ring, and Angle Angle Slammed Big Show on the Spanish announcers' table. Afterward, Lesnar and Angle fought each other back inside the ring, and Lesnar threw Angle to the outside again. Big Show returned to the ring and chokeslammed Lesnar and Angle simultaneously, and covered both men but couldn't score a pinfall. Angle then placed Lesnar in an ankle lock, but Big Show broke the hold. Angle performed an Angle Slam on Big Show again, and then delivered an Angle Slam to Lesnar, covering him for a pinfall and winning the WWE Championship.

== Reception ==
The Pepsi Center has a maximum capacity of 19,000, but that was reduced for Vengeance 2003. The event had an attendance of 9,500. The event resulted in 322,000 pay-per-view buys. The promotion's pay-per-view revenue was $24.7 million. Canadian Online Explorers professional wrestling section rated the entire event an 8.5 out of 10 stars. The No Disqualification Triple Threat main event match was rated a 10 out of 10 stars. The event was released on DVD on August 26, 2003 by Sony Music Entertainment.

== Aftermath ==
While the 2003 Vengeance was a SmackDown!-exclusive PPV, the event became Raw-exclusive the following year. It continued to be promoted as a Raw-exclusive event in 2005 and 2006.

== Results ==
No.	Results	Stipulations	Times
1^{H}	Último Dragón defeated Chris Kanyon	Singles match	4:04
2	Eddie Guerrero defeated Chris Benoit	Singles match for the vacant WWE United States Championship	21:54
3	Jamie Noble (with Nidia) defeated Billy Gunn (with Torrie Wilson)	Singles match	4:59
4	Bradshaw won by last eliminating Brother Love (Note: Other participants in the bar room brawl: The Brooklyn Brawler, Chuck Palumbo, Chris Kanyon, Conquistadore Dos, Conquistador Uno, Danny Basham, Doink the Clown, Doug Basham, Easter Bunny, Faarooq, Funaki, John Hennigan, Johnny Stamboli, Shannon Moore, Nunzio, Matt Cappotelli, Matt Hardy, Orlando Jordan, Sean O'Haire and Spanky.)	The APA Invitational Bar Room Brawl	4:31
5	The World's Greatest Tag Team (Charlie Haas and Shelton Benjamin) (c) defeated Billy Kidman and Rey Mysterio	Tag team match for the WWE Tag Team Championship	15:01
6	Sable defeated Stephanie McMahon	No Countout match	6:25
7	The Undertaker defeated John Cena	Singles match	16:06
8	Mr. McMahon defeated Zach Gowen	Singles match	14:22
9	Kurt Angle defeated Brock Lesnar (c) and Big Show	Triple threat match for the WWE Championship	17:38
(c) / – the champion(s) heading into the match; H / – the match was broadcast prior to the pay-per-view on Sunday Night Heat

=== United States Championship Tournament bracket ===
1st Round; SmackDown; June 17 – July 8, 2003 (Aired: June 19 – July 10)
Chris Benoit	Submission
Rhyno	16:22
Matt Hardy	Pinfall
Rikishi	4:05
Billy Gunn	Pinfall
John Cena	5:53
Eddie Guerrero	Pinfall
Último Dragón	3:22

Semifinals; SmackDown; July 13, 2003 (Aired: July 17)
Chris Benoit	Submission
Matt Hardy	7:27
Billy Gunn	8:28
Eddie Guerrero	Pinfall

Final; Vengeance; July 27, 2003
Chris Benoit	21:54
Eddie Guerrero	Pinfall
