= New Blood (professional wrestling) =

Professional wrestling stable

- The logo of the New Blood

Stable
- Members: See below
- Name: New Blood
- Debut: April 10, 2000
- Disbanded: July 9, 2000

The New Blood was a professional wrestling stable in World Championship Wrestling (WCW) in 2000.

== History ==
In early 2000, WCW decided that Kevin Sullivan's booking style was not as successful as they had hoped. So, they decided to bring back former WCW president Eric Bischoff and former World Wrestling Federation (WWF) head of creative Vince Russo, putting them together to run WCW, with the thought that they could keep each other in check.

On-screen, Bischoff and Russo took over and declared all WCW titles vacant on April 10, 2000. They also declared a new stable with both of them at the head called The New Blood, which consisted of most of the younger wrestlers in WCW as well as longtime talent that had been largely in the background for years, feuding with "The Millionaire's Club", the older stars of WCW, who they claimed held them all back.

On April 16, at Spring Stampede in Chicago, Illinois, all of the titles were filled with matches between the New Blood and the Millionaire's Club. The New Blood won all of the vacant WCW titles, with the exception of the WCW Hardcore Championship, which was won by Terry Funk.

Following Spring Stampede, Hulk Hogan feuded with the New Blood, during which time he would occasionally wear a black denim vest, with the initials "F.U.N.B." on the back in white. During a televised promo, Hogan explained what the initials stood for, saying "The N.B. stands for New Blood, and you can guess what the F.U. means, brother!".

The idea was to get the younger talent over and generate more interest among the younger fans that watched the WWF instead of WCW, although it later evolved into a New World Order (nWo) rehash, especially as it followed up to the recent nWo 2000 group. The feuds continued for another month or so before the New Blood disbanded due to WCW management making the decision that it was not working, as the Millionaire's Club got most of the positive fan reaction.

The true end of the angle occurred on July 9 at Bash at the Beach in Daytona Beach, Florida, after the infamous Russo shoot promo, which caused Hogan and Bischoff to leave the promotion. However, the New Blood theme continued in WCW coinciding with the New Blood Rising pay-per-view in August 2000.

== Impact ==
Diamond Dallas Page quit WCW (in storyline), citing his feud with Eric Bischoff and the New Blood cost him his health, the WCW World Heavyweight Championship, his wife Kimberly, half of his possessions via divorce, and his best friend Chris Kanyon.

Ric Flair's wrestling career was ended (in storyline) by Vince Russo and David Flair in a handicap match, with Flair's daughter Meghan throwing the towel in; Ric and son Reid had their heads shaved after the loss. In reality, Flair needed to have rotator cuff surgery.

Sting suffered major injuries (storyline) after being set on fire and tossed off the TurnerVision scaffolding by Vampiro.

Hollywood Hulk Hogan suffered injuries (storyline) after being put through a table by Goldberg. Hogan was later publicly fired from WCW by Vince Russo during an in-ring promo.

Jim Duggan suffered internal bleeding (storyline) and was stretchered out of the ring following Goldberg targeting his kidney.

== Members ==
The New Blood was composed of 7 different "stables" within itself: 3 Count, KroniK, The Filthy Animals, The Mamalukes, The Natural Born Thrillers, R&B Security (which stands for Russo and Bischoff Security), and the New Blood itself. The New Blood members were the ones who mostly feuded with The Millionaire's Club, while the other two were more of supporting casts. The Natural Born Thrillers were all rookies (with the exception of Shawn Stasiak), while the rest of the New Blood had already had TV time.

Leaders

- Eric Bischoff
- Vince Russo
- Jeff Jarrett

Members

- Tank Abbott
- Brian Adams
- David Arquette
- The Artist
- Mike Awesome
- Buff Bagwell
- Bam Bam Bigelow
- Chris Candido
- Bryan Clark
- Crowbar
- Disco Inferno/Hip Hop Inferno/Disqo
- Shane Douglas
- David Flair
- Goldberg
- Juventud Guerrera
- Ron and Don Harris
- Bret Hart
- Shane Helms
- Horace Hogan
- Mark Jindrak

- Johnny the Bull
- Chris Kanyon
- Evan Karagias
- Billy Kidman
- Konnan
- Ernest Miller
- Rey Misterio, Jr.
- Shannon Moore
- Sean O'Haire
- Chuck Palumbo
- Mike Rapada
- Reno
- Mike Sanders
- Elix Skipper
- Norman Smiley
- M.I. Smooth
- Shawn Stasiak
- Scott Steiner
- Lance Storm
- Vampiro
- Big Vito
- The Wall

Valets

- Tygress
- Daffney
- Miss Hancock
- Kimberly Page
- Madusa
- Midajah
- Paisley
- Shakira
- Tammy Lynn Sytch
- Torrie Wilson

== Championships and accomplishments ==
- World Championship Wrestling
  - WCW World Heavyweight Championship (5 times) – Jeff Jarrett (4), David Arquette (1)
  - WCW United States Heavyweight Championship (1 time) – Scott Steiner
  - WCW Cruiserweight Championship (3 times) – Chris Candido (1), Crowbar (1), Daffney (1)
  - WCW Hardcore Championship (5 times) – Shane Douglas (1), Eric Bischoff (1), Johnny the Bull (1), Big Vito (2)
  - WCW World Tag Team Championship (2 times) – Shane Douglas and Buff Bagwell (1), Chuck Palumbo and Shawn Stasiak (1)
