= Canada national team =

Canadian National Team or Team Canada may refer to:

== Canada at multi-sport events ==
- Canada at the Olympics
  - Canadian Olympic Committee
- Canada at the Paralympics
  - Canadian Paralympic Committee
- Canada at the Commonwealth Games
- Canada at the Pan American Games

== Canada's national sport teams ==
- Canada men's national field hockey team
- Canada men's national floorball team
- Canada men's national ice hockey team
- Canada men's national ice sledge hockey team
- Canada men's national junior ice hockey team
- Canada men's national soccer team
- Canada men's national volleyball team
- Canada men's national water polo team
- Canada men's national youth soccer teams
- Canada men's national basketball team
- Canada national ringette team
- Canada national quidditch team
- Canada women's national basketball team
- Canada women's national ice hockey team
- Canada women's national softball team
- Canada women's national soccer team
- Team Canada (roller derby)

=== Summit series hockey teams ===
- Team Canada, 1972 Summit Series
- Team Canada, 1974 Summit Series
- Team Canada, on five occasions between 1976 and 1991 for the Canada Cup

== Professional wrestling ==
- Team Canada (TNA) (2004–2006), Total Nonstop Action Wrestling
- Team Canada (WCW) (2000–2001), World Championship Wrestling
- The Un-Americans or Team Canada, World Wrestling Entertainment

== Other sports ==
- Team Canada (baseball), a franchise of the Arizona Winter League

== Other ==
- Team Canada (politics)
