= Vengeance (2002) =

World Wrestling Entertainment pay-per-view event

- Promotional poster featuring The Rock, Kurt Angle, and The Undertaker
- Promotion: World Wrestling Entertainment
- Brand(s): Raw; SmackDown!
- Date: July 21, 2002
- City: Detroit, Michigan
- Venue: Joe Louis Arena
- Attendance: 12,000
- Buy rate: 375,000
- Tagline: Quick & Merciless

Pay-per-view chronology
← Previous; King of the Ring	Next → SummerSlam

Vengeance chronology
← Previous; 2001	Next → 2003

The 2002 Vengeance was a professional wrestling pay-per-view (PPV) event produced by World Wrestling Entertainment (WWE). It was the second annual Vengeance and took place on July 21, 2002, at the Joe Louis Arena in Detroit, Michigan, held for wrestlers from the promotion's Raw and SmackDown! brand divisions.

This was the first Vengeance held following the introduction of the brand extension in March and was subsequently the last Vengeance to feature multiple brands until 2007, as beginning with Bad Blood in June 2003, all monthly PPVs outside of the "Big Four" (WrestleMania, SummerSlam, Survivor Series, and Royal Rumble) became brand-exclusive until brand-exclusive PPVs were discontinued after WrestleMania 23 in April 2007. It was also the first Vengeance event held under the WWE name, after the company had been renamed from World Wrestling Federation (WWF) to WWE in May that year.

The main event from SmackDown! saw The Rock win the WWE Undisputed Championship in a Triple Threat match also involving Kurt Angle and the defending champion The Undertaker. The main event from Raw was between the champion Rob Van Dam and challenger Brock Lesnar for the WWE Intercontinental Championship, in which Van Dam retained his championship by disqualification. The undercard featured The Un-Americans (Lance Storm and Christian) versus Hollywood Hulk Hogan and Edge for Raw's WWE Tag Team Championship, Booker T versus Big Show in a No Disqualification match, and John Cena versus Chris Jericho in Cena's first PPV match.

== Production ==
=== Background ===
In December 2001, World Wrestling Entertainment (WWE), at the time known as the World Wrestling Federation (WWF), held a professional wrestling pay-per-view (PPV) event titled Vengeance to replace Armageddon that year as the Armageddon name was considered potentially offensive to the victims of the September 11 attacks. After the company was renamed from WWF to WWE in May 2002, the promotion announced that Vengeance would return that year, but in the July slot of their PPV calendar—as Armageddon was reinstated for that December—thus establishing Vengeance as an annual event for the promotion, with the 2002 event also being the first Vengeance promoted under the WWE name. The 2002 event would also be the first Vengeance held under the first brand extension that was introduced in March, in which the promotion divided its roster into two distinct brands, Raw and SmackDown!, where wrestlers were exclusively assigned to perform. The second Vengeance thus featured wrestlers from both brands and was held on July 21, 2002, at the Joe Louis Arena in Detroit, Michigan.

"Stone Cold" Steve Austin was featured on early promotional posters for the event, despite not wrestling or appearing at the event due to him walking out from the company the previous month.

=== Storylines ===
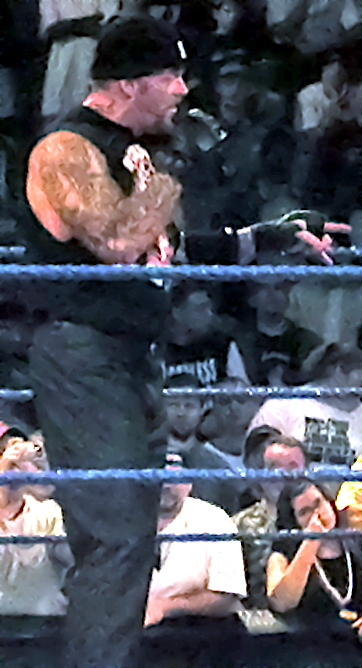
The Undertaker, the WWE Undisputed Champion

Vengeance featured professional wrestling matches that involved different wrestlers from pre-existing feuds, plots, and storylines that were played out on Raw and SmackDown! – WWE's television programs. All wrestlers were from WWE's Raw and SmackDown! brands – a storyline division in which WWE employees are assigned to a television program of the same name.

The main feud from SmackDown! heading into Vengeance was between The Rock, Kurt Angle, and The Undertaker fighting for the WWE Undisputed Championship. At King of the Ring, The Undertaker defeated Triple H to retain the title. During the match, The Rock interfered hitting The Undertaker with a Rock Bottom. The Undertaker, angry because of The Rock's interference, asked Mr. McMahon for a match with The Rock. McMahon booked the match for Vengeance and told The Undertaker that it was for the championship. On the July 4 episode of SmackDown!, however, The Undertaker wrestled Angle to a draw in a WWE Undisputed Championship match, when The Undertaker pinned Angle and tapped out to Angle's submission hold at the same time. On the July 8 episode of Raw, McMahon announced that Angle would be added to the match, making it a triple threat match. On the July 11 episode of SmackDown!, The Rock made his return to confront Angle, who challenged him to a match the next week, only for The Undertaker to attack both The Rock and Angle. Later that night, as Angle teamed up with Chris Jericho against John Cena and The Undertaker, The Rock hit the Rock Bottom on both Angle and The Undertaker. On the July 18 episode of SmackDown!, The Rock defeated Angle by disqualification due to interference from The Undertaker. Angle then nailed The Undertaker with a chair.

The main feud from Raw heading into Vengeance was between Rob Van Dam and Brock Lesnar for the Intercontinental Championship. The previous month at King of the Ring, Van Dam defeated Chris Jericho in the first semifinal match while Lesnar defeated Test in the second semifinal match. Later that night, Lesnar defeated Van Dam in the finals become King of the Ring and earn the right to face the WWE Undisputed Champion at SummerSlam. Van Dam had held the Intercontinental Championship since the May 27 episode of Raw when he defeated Eddie Guerrero in a ladder match. On the June 24 episode of Raw, Van Dam interrupted Lesnar's King of the Ring coronation by attacking him from behind and knocking him down with the Van Daminator and a diving superkick. Later that night, Lesnar faced Van Dam for the Intercontinental Championship in a match that Lesnar lost by disqualification when Lesnar's agent, Paul Heyman, interfered. Afterward, Lesnar nailed Van Dam with two powerbombs, including one through the announce table. On the July 1 episode of Raw, Lesnar and Heyman issued a challenge to Van Dam at Vengeance for the Intercontinental Championship, which Van Dam accepted. On the July 8 episode of Raw, Van Dam brawled with Lesnar and Heyman, with Van Dam nailing Heyman in the face with a Van Terminator with a steel chair. Later that night, Van Dam chased Shawn Michaels to the back while being distracted, allowing Lesnar to perform an F-5 on Van Dam onto the steel ramp. On the July 15 episode of Raw, Lesnar and The Undertaker defeated Van Dam and Ric Flair in a tag team match. After the match, Lesnar attacked The Undertaker.

Another storyline heading into Vengeance was Triple H determining what brand he would permanently join. He could either stay on SmackDown! with the new General manager Stephanie McMahon or move to Raw with General Manager Eric Bischoff. Originally the New World Order (nWo) was planning to threaten Triple H to join the nWo if he joined Raw, but due to backstage circumstances, the nWo was written off television a week before Vengeance. Shawn Michaels, however, would still promise to bring Triple H to Raw.

John Cena made his WWE debut a month before Vengeance on the June 27 episode of SmackDown! and had entered a minor feud with Kurt Angle and Chris Jericho. Jericho and Edge were also feuding at that time. Their feud began on the June 6 episode of SmackDown! when Edge and Jericho were scheduled to compete in the King of the Ring first round tournament, but Edge forfeited his match to Jericho due to a legitimate shoulder injury that he suffered on the May 30 episode of SmackDown! in a steel cage match hitting Angle with a spear. Jericho then forced Edge to raise his hand in victory, but Edge refused and tried to assault Jericho, who retaliated by targeting Edge's shoulder, including nailing his shoulder onto the steel ring steps with the steel chair. Edge and Jericho were booked for a match at Vengeance, until Hollywood Hulk Hogan and Edge defeated Billy and Chuck for the WWE Tag Team Championship on the July 4 episode of SmackDown!. Later that night, Jericho had a match with Cena, which Jericho won after he pinned Cena with his own feet on the ropes. On the July 11 episode of SmackDown!, Cena teamed with The Undertaker to take on Angle and Jericho in a tag match, which Cena and The Undertaker won after Cena pinned Jericho.

Chris Jericho then asked Mr. McMahon to let The Un-Americans (Lance Storm and Christian) to wrestle Hollywood Hulk Hogan and Edge for the WWE Tag Team Championship at Vengeance, to which McMahon agreed.

On the July 8 episode of Raw, Jeff Hardy defeated William Regal to win the European Championship. Regal, upset after his loss, used his rematch clause at Vengeance. On the July 15 episode of Raw, Hardy teamed with Bubba Ray and Spike Dudley to take on Regal, Chris Benoit and Eddie Guerrero in a six-man tag team elimination match. Benoit last eliminated Hardy by forcing him to submit to the Crippler Crossface following a brass knuckles shot by Regal, who had already been eliminated.

Booker T had been feuding with the nWo at the time of their demise after being kicked out of the group on the June 10 episode of Raw. On the June 17 episode of Raw, Booker T competed in the King of the Ring quarter final round against Brock Lesnar, who won following the interference from the nWo. On the July 15 episode of Raw, Booker T defeated former nWo member Big Show by disqualification after Big Show hit Booker T with a chair. After the match, Big Show asked Raw General Manager Eric Bischoff if he could fight Booker T in a no disqualification match at Vengeance, which Bischoff granted.

On the June 6 episode of SmackDown!, Jamie Noble debuted by attacking The Hurricane and was joined by Nidia. On the June 20 episode of SmackDown!, Noble defeated Billy Kidman after he nailed him with a DDT off the top rope. Afterward, Hurricane got his mask back (that Noble and Nidia had taken from him the previous week) after nailing Noble with a chokeslam. Then at King of the Ring, Noble defeated Hurricane for the Cruiserweight Championship. The following three weeks on SmackDown!, Kidman and Hurricane defeated Noble and Tajiri in two tag team matches and Kidman then challenged Noble to a Cruiserweight Championship match at Vengeance.

== Event ==
Other on-screen personnel
Role:	Name:
English commentators	Michael Cole (First half)
English commentators	Tazz (First Half)
English commentators	Jim Ross (Second Half)
English commentators	Jerry Lawler (Second Half)
Spanish commentators	Carlos Cabrera
Spanish commentators	Hugo Savinovich
Interviewers	Jonathan Coachman
Interviewers	Marc Lloyd
Interviewers	Terri
Ring announcer	Howard Finkel
Referees	Mike Chioda
Referees	Charles Robinson
Referees	Nick Patrick
Referees	Jack Doan
Referees	Jim Korderas
Referees	Mike Sparks
Referees	Brian Hebner
Referees	Chad Patton
Referees	Earl Hebner
General managers	Eric Bischoff (Raw)
General managers	Stephanie McMahon (SmackDown!)

Before the event went live on pay-per-view, Goldust defeated Stevie Richards in a match aired live on Sunday Night Heat.

The show began with Jim Ross and Jerry Lawler until Tazz and Michael Cole said they deserved to call Vengeance just as much as Ross and Lawler should. Ross agreed and let Tazz and Cole call the first half of the show.

=== Preliminary matches ===
The first match saw The Dudley Boyz (Bubba Ray Dudley and Spike Dudley) face Eddie Guerrero and Chris Benoit in an Elimination tag team tables match. Guerrero was eliminated by Spike after a Dudley Dog through a table. Spike was eliminated by Benoit after a Military Press Slam through a table. Benoit was eliminated by Bubba Ray after a Bubba Bomb through a table, winning the match for the Dudley Boyz.

The second match was for the WWE Cruiserweight Championship between Jamie Noble and Billy Kidman. Noble pinned Kidman after a Gibson Driver to retain the title.

The third match was for the WWE European Championship between Jeff Hardy and William Regal. Hardy pinned Regal with a roll-up to retain the title.

The fourth match was between John Cena and Chris Jericho. Jericho attempted to apply the Walls of Jericho on Cena, but Cena countered with a roll-up to win the match, ending their feud.

The fifth match was for the WWE Intercontinental Championship between Rob Van Dam and Brock Lesnar. In the end, Lesnar attempted an F5 on Van Dam but Van Dam countered with a DDT and executed a Five Star Frog Splash on Lesnar. Van Dam attempted to pin Lesnar, but Paul Heyman pulled Charles Robinson out of the ring, meaning Van Dam retained the title by disqualification. After the match, Van Dam performed a Baseball Slide on Heyman and Robinson attacked Heyman. Van Dam attempted a Van Terminator on Lesnar, but Heyman stopped Van Dam and Lesnar performed an F5 onto a steel chair on Van Dam.

The sixth match was a No Disqualification match between Booker T and Big Show. Booker T performed a Scissors Kick on Big Show through a broadcast table, another Scissors Kick and a Houston Hangover to win the match.

A segment occurred involving SmackDown! General Manager Stephanie McMahon and Raw General Manager Eric Bischoff trying to sign Triple H to Raw or SmackDown!. After Shawn Michaels told Triple H he had an idea (referencing reforming D-Generation X), Triple H decided to sign with the Raw brand.

The seventh match was for the WWE Tag Team Championship between Hollywood Hulk Hogan and Edge and The Un-Americans (Lance Storm and Christian). During the match, Edge attempted a Spear on Storm, but Edge accidentally speared the referee. Test interfered, executing a Big Boot on Edge. Storm pinned Edge for a near-fall. Edge performed a Spear on Storm, but Christian distracted the referee, allowing Chris Jericho to interfere and hit Edge with a title belt. Storm pinned Edge to win the match and the title for The Un-Americans.

=== Main event match ===
The main event was a Triple threat match for the WWE Undisputed Championship between The Undertaker, The Rock and Kurt Angle. During the match, The Rock performed a Chokeslam on The Undertaker and applied an Ankle Lock on Angle, but Angle countered with a Rock Bottom on The Rock. Angle attempted an Angle Slam on The Undertaker, but The Undertaker countered with an Angle Slam on Angle. The Rock performed a People's Elbow on The Undertaker, but Angle pulled The Rock out of the ring and nearly pinned The Undertaker for a near-fall. Angle hit The Undertaker with a steel chair and performed an Angle Slam on The Rock, getting near-falls on both competitors. The Undertaker performed a Last Ride on The Rock, but Angle broke up the pinfall by applying an Ankle Lock on The Undertaker, The Undertaker escaped the hold. The Undertaker performed a Chokeslam on Angle and The Rock performed a Rock Bottom on The Undertaker for a near-fall. Angle performed an Angle Slam on The Undertaker and The Rock performed a Rock Bottom on Angle to win the title for a record seventh time.

== Aftermath ==
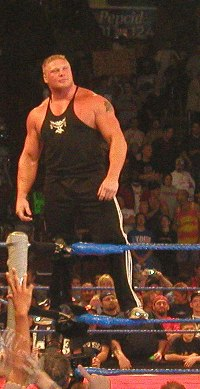
Brock Lesnar went on to win the WWE Undisputed Championship at Summerslam

After winning the WWE Undisputed Championship, The Rock then entered a feud with the number one contender Brock Lesnar for the upcoming SummerSlam event. Lesnar went on to win the match and become the youngest champion in the title's history. It was also the last match for The Rock as an active WWE wrestler, and his final reign as WWE Champion until winning the title at the Royal Rumble in 2013, prior to being a full-time actor in Hollywood.

Triple H and Shawn Michaels came out the night after Vengeance and what appeared to be a reunion for D-Generation X was instead Triple H turning heel and nailing a Pedigree on Michaels. This caused Michaels to retaliate and challenge Triple H to an Unsanctioned Street Fight at SummerSlam, marking his first official match since WrestleMania XIV. Michaels won the match, and Triple H attacked him after the match.

The following night on Raw, Eric Bischoff decided to merge the Intercontinental Championship and the European Championship into one, putting Rob Van Dam and Jeff Hardy against each other in a ladder match. Van Dam won the match, and the European Championship was retired. On the next Raw, Van Dam lost the Intercontinental Championship to Chris Benoit, who would then jump to the SmackDown! brand. Van Dam used his rematch clause for SummerSlam and brought the Intercontinental Championship back to Raw.

After losing to John Cena, Chris Jericho had to face Edge in a steel cage match on the July 25 episode of SmackDown!. Edge won the match, and Jericho, along with The Un-Americans, moved to the Raw brand. Jericho then went on to feud with Ric Flair. Lance Storm and Christian began to feud with Booker T and Goldust, while Test had a one-month feud with The Undertaker. After his steel cage match win over Jericho, Edge began a two-month-long feud with Eddie Guerrero.

After losing the triple threat match to The Rock, Kurt Angle was pinned by Rey Mysterio in a six-man tag team match on the August 8 episode of SmackDown!. As a result, on the following episode of SmackDown!, he challenged Mysterio to a match at SummerSlam to which Mysterio agreed.

Although the 2002 Vengeance featured wrestlers from both brands, the following year, Vengeance was promoted as a SmackDown!-exclusive PPV.

== Results ==
No.	Results	Stipulations	Times
1^{H}	Goldust defeated Steven Richards	Singles match	3:49
2	The Dudley Boyz (Bubba Ray and Spike) defeated Eddie Guerrero and Chris Benoit	Elimination Tables match	15:01
3	Jamie Noble (c) (with Nidia) defeated Billy Kidman	Singles match for the WWE Cruiserweight Championship	7:27
4	Jeff Hardy (c) defeated William Regal	Singles match for the WWE European Championship	4:16
5	John Cena defeated Chris Jericho	Singles match	6:16
6	Rob Van Dam (c) defeated Brock Lesnar (with Paul Heyman) by disqualification	Singles match for the WWE Intercontinental Championship	9:21
7	Booker T defeated Big Show	No Disqualification match	6:12
8	The Un-Americans (Christian and Lance Storm) defeated Edge and Hollywood Hulk Hogan (c)	Tag team match for the WWE Tag Team Championship	10:02
9	The Rock defeated Kurt Angle and The Undertaker (c)	Triple Threat match for the WWE Undisputed Championship	19:47
(c) / – the champion(s) heading into the match; H / – the match was broadcast prior to the pay-per-view on Sunday Night Heat
