= Team Canada (WCW) =

Professional wrestling stable

Statistics
- Members: (United States) Mike Awesome (United States) Jim Duggan (United States) Major Gunns (Canada) Bret Hart (Canada) Carl Oulette (Canada) Jacques Rougeau (United States) Elix Skipper (Canada) Lance Storm
- Billed from: Canada
- Debut: August 13, 2000
- Disbanded: March 26, 2001
- Years active: 2000–2001

Team Canada was a professional wrestling stable, active in World Championship Wrestling (WCW) from August 13, 2000 to March 26, 2001. The team was composed of Canadian and American wrestlers who portrayed characters who believed that Canada was superior to the United States of America.

== History ==
Team Canada came into existence in Vancouver, British Columbia, Canada, at New Blood Rising on August 13, 2000, where the Canadian Lance Storm was defending the WCW United States Heavyweight Championship in a match with Mike Awesome. The match was refereed by the Canadian Jacques Rougeau, who enabled Storm to defeat Awesome and retain his title by constantly changing the rules. Following the match, the semi-retired Canadian wrestler Bret Hart came to the ring and hugged Storm and Rougeau.

On the August 14, 2000 episode of WCW Monday Nitro in Kelowna, British Columbia, Canada, Storm was forced to face Awesome in another title defense. He managed to defeat Awesome following interference from Rougeau, Carl Ouellet (also a Canadian) and Elix Skipper (who was billed as being a former Canadian Football League player). Following the match, Storm announced that the four were to be collectively known as Team Canada.

At the time, Storm held three championships - the WCW United States Heavyweight Championship, the WCW Cruiserweight Championship and the WCW Hardcore Championship. Storm had renamed the championships the "Canadian Heavyweight Championship", "100 Kilos and Under Championship", and "Saskatchewan Hardcore International Title", respectively, placing large stickers featuring the Canadian flag on each title belt. Storm then gave the 100 Kilos and Under Championship to Skipper and the Saskatchewan Hardcore International Title to Oulette to reward them for assisting him in his match with Mike Awesome earlier that evening. Oulette lost his title to Norman Smiley later that night, while Skipper retained his title until October 2, 2000, when he lost to Mike Sanders. Storm continued to defend the Canadian Heavyweight Championship himself. Rougeau and Oulette left WCW soon thereafter, reducing the stable to Storm and Skipper.

Team Canada quickly began a feud with the face Misfits In Action stable, with Storm and General Hugh G. Rection, the leader of the Misfits, trading the Canadian Heavyweight Championship (which Rection renamed the "WCW United States Heavyweight Championship" as soon as he won it). Storm was assisted in a title defence on September 17, 2000 at Fall Brawl 2000 when the guest referee of a title match between Storm and Rection, the patriotic American Jim Duggan, turned heel by helping Storm defeat Rection, thus joining Team Canada. Duggan shaved off his beard and chopped off his hair. Rection eventually won the title on October 29, 2000 by defeating Storm and Duggan in a handicap match. Storm, however, would win the title for a third time on November 13, 2000 when the American Major Gunns defected from the Misfits and joined Team Canada by throwing a towel in on behalf of Rection, costing him a title defence against Storm.

Team Canada feuded with The Filthy Animals throughout late 2000. On January 3, 2001, the American Mike Awesome joined Team Canada (Awesome was part of the original Team Canada stable in FMW), in the process evicting Duggan from the stable. After Skipper and Gunns also left the stable, Storm and Awesome began challenging for the WCW World Tag Team Championship. On the final episode of WCW Monday Nitro on March 26, 2001, Chuck Palumbo and Sean O'Haire defeated Storm and Awesome to retain the WCW World Tag Team Championship. The stable disbanded immediately thereafter as WCW was purchased by the World Wrestling Federation (although Storm and Awesome continued to team upon joining the WWF).

== Members ==
- Mike Awesome
- Jim Duggan
- Major Gunns
- Bret Hart^{1}
- Carl Oulette
- Jacques Rougeau
- Elix Skipper
- Lance Storm

== Championships ==
- World Championship Wrestling

- WCW Hardcore Championship (2 times) – Lance Storm (1 time), Carl Oulette (1 time)
- WCW United States Heavyweight Championship (3 times) – Lance Storm
- WCW Cruiserweight Championship (2 times) – Lance Storm (1 time), Elix Skipper (1 time)

== See also ==
- The Quebecers
- The Hart Foundation
- The Un-Americans
- Team Canada (TNA)
- The Green Regime

== Notes ==
1 For one night, on August 13, 2000, at New Blood Rising.
