= List of WCW Hardcore Champions =

Listing of professional wrestling champions for the WCW Hardcore Championship

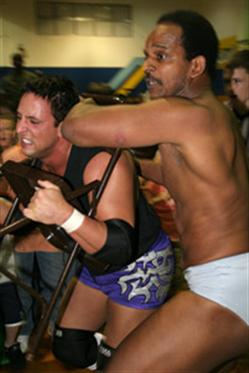
Norman Smiley (right) was the first WCW Hardcore Champion.

The WCW Hardcore Championship was a professional wrestling Hardcore Championship contested for in World Championship Wrestling (WCW). During late 1999, WCW promoted various hardcore matches, bouts where there were no disqualifications or countouts, that mainly involved Norman Smiley and Brian Knobbs. The developing rivalry between the two wrestlers led WCW to announce the creation of the WCW Hardcore Championship in November 1999. In January 2001, the champion Meng signed a contract with the World Wrestling Federation (WWF) after his WCW contract expired. The WCW Hardcore Championship was vacated; a few months later, WCW was purchased by the WWF, and while the WWF used WCW's World Heavyweight, United States, Cruiserweight, and Tag Team Championships in the subsequent Invasion storyline, the WCW Hardcore Championship was not re-introduced.

Title reigns were determined by professional wrestling hardcore match types with wrestlers involved in pre-existing scripts feuds, plots and storylines or were awarded the title due to scripted circumstances. Wrestlers were portrayed as either villains or fan favorites as they followed a series of tension-building events, which culminated in a hardcore wrestling type match or series of matches for the championship. The inaugural champion was Norman Smiley, who defeated Brian Knobbs at Mayhem. Before the promotion's purchase, the title was vacant, though, Meng was the final wrestler to hold the championship. The title was won in Canadian municipalities and in American states. Smiley held the title the longest at 51 days, and at less than one day, Carl Ouellet has the shortest title reign. Brian Knobbs and Terry Funk both won the title on three occasions, the most in the championship's history; this also ties with the number of times the title was vacated. Overall, there were 18 reigns.

== Reigns ==
Key
No.	Overall reign number
Reign	Reign number for the specific champion
Days	Number of days held
†	Championship change is unrecognized by the promotion

No.	Champion	Championship change			Reign statistics		Notes	Ref.
No.	Champion	Date	Event	Location	Reign	Days	Notes	Ref.
1	Fit Finlay	July 11, 1999	Bash at the Beach	Fort Lauderdale, FL	1	29	Won the Junkyard Invitational to win the WCW Hardcore Championship, represented by a trophy. Unrecognized by WCW, however WWE recognizes the trophy as a reign.	
—	Vacated	August 9, 1999	Nitro	Boise, ID	—	—	WCW President Eric Bischoff vacated the title due to a leg injury sustained by Fit Finlay. Finlay’s reign would not be recognized in the title's history.	
2	Norman Smiley	November 21, 1999	Mayhem	Toronto, ON	1	51	Smiley defeated Brian Knobs in the finals of a tournament to retain the title in his first defense of his inaugural championship.	
3	Brian Knobbs	January 12, 2000	Thunder	Erie, PA	1	27	This title change aired on tape delay.	
4	Bam Bam Bigelow	February 7, 2000	Nitro	Tulsa, OK	1	13		
5	Brian Knobbs	February 20, 2000	SuperBrawl	San Francisco, CA	2	8		
6	3 Count	February 28, 2000	Nitro	Minneapolis, MN	1	20	Helms, Karagias, and Moore, known as the 3 Count stable, defeated Brian Knobs simultaneously in a match, and as a result, WCW allowed the Freebird Rule in which all three wrestlers were able to defend the championship.	
7	Brian Knobbs	March 19, 2000	Uncensored	Miami, FL	3	22		
—	Vacated	April 10, 2000	Nitro	Denver, CO	—	—	WCW Presidents Vince Russo and Eric Bischoff vacated every WCW championship during WCW's reboot.	
8	Terry Funk	April 16, 2000	Spring Stampede	Chicago, IL	1	36	Funk defeated Norman Smiley to win the vacant championship.	
9	Shane Douglas	May 22, 2000	Nitro	Grand Rapids, MI	1	1	Chris Candido was the special guest referee.	
10	Terry Funk	May 23, 2000	Thunder	Saginaw, MI	2	13	This was a 2-on-1 Handicap match where Funk, disguised as Ralphus in a gorilla suit, teamed with Norman Smiley. After the match, Funk revealed himself under the mask.	
11	Eric Bischoff	June 5, 2000	Nitro	Atlanta, GA	1	1		
12	Big Vito and Johnny the Bull	June 6, 2000	Thunder	Knoxville, TN	1	13	WCW President Eric Bischoff awarded Vito and Johnny the championship, and he announced that the Freebird Rule was in effect for this title reign, allowing both wrestlers to defend the title. This title reign aired on tape delay.	
13	Big Vito	June 19, 2000	Nitro	Billings, MT	2	35	Vito defeated Johnny the Bull to be named the sole champion.	
14	Lance Storm	July 24, 2000	Nitro	Cleveland, OH	1	21	Storm renames championship "Saskatchewan Hardcore International Title" shortly after winning it.	
15	Carl Ouellet	August 14, 2000	Nitro	Kelowna, BC	1	<1	Lance Storm awarded Ouellet the championship.	
16	Norman Smiley	August 14, 2000	Nitro	Kelowna, BC	2	42		
—	Vacated	September 27, 2000	Thunder	Wilkes-Barre, PA	—	—	The championship was vacated by WCW Commissioner Mike Sanders and a tournament announced to begin that night. The episode aired on tape delay.	
17	Reno	October 2, 2000	Nitro	San Francisco, CA	1	37	Sgt. AWOL originally defeated Reno to win the vacant championship in a tournament final. However, Mike Sanders reversed the decision and awarded Reno the title.	
18	Crowbar	November 8, 2000	Thunder	Chicago, IL	1	39	This title change aired on tape delay.	
19	Terry Funk	December 17, 2000	Starrcade	Washington, D.C.	3	28		
20	Meng	January 14, 2001	Sin	Indianapolis, IN	1	7	This was a triple threat hardcore match, also involving Crowbar.	
—	Deactivated	January 21, 2001	—	—	—	—	Meng left WCW for WWF a week after winning the title to compete as Haku in the 2001 Royal Rumble and the championship was abandoned.	

== Combined reigns ==
Rank	Wrestler	No. of reigns	Combined days
1	Norman Smiley	2	93
2	Terry Funk	3	77
3	Brian Knobbs	3	57
4	Big Vito	2	48
5	Reno	1	35
6	Crowbar	1	31
-	Fit Finlay	-	29
7	Lance Storm	1	21
8	Evan Karagias	1	20
8	Shane Helms	1	20
8	Shannon Moore	1	20
11	Bam Bam Bigelow	1	13
11	Johnny the Bull	1	13
13	Meng	1	7
14	Eric Bischoff	1	1
14	Shane Douglas	1	1
16	Carl Ouellet	1	<1
