= The Millionaire's Club =

Professional wrestling stable

Stable
- Members: See below
- Debut: April 10, 2000
- Disbanded: July 9, 2000

The Millionaire's Club was a professional wrestling stable in World Championship Wrestling (WCW) in 2000.

== History ==
In early 2000, WCW decided that Kevin Sullivan's booking style was not as successful as they had hoped. So, they decided to bring back former WCW president Eric Bischoff and former head of creativity Vince Russo, putting them together to run WCW with the thought that they could keep each other in check.

On-screen, Bischoff and Russo took over and declared all WCW championships vacant on April 10, 2000. They also declared a new stable with both of them at the helm called The New Blood, which consisted of most of the younger, up-and-coming wrestlers in WCW along with longtime talent that had never been pushed for years. Their main enemies became known as the Millionaire's Club, the older veteran stars of the company who they claimed held back the younger talent.

On April 16, 2000, at Spring Stampede in Chicago, Illinois, all of the titles were filled with matches between the New Blood and the Millionaire's Club. The New Blood won all of the vacant WCW titles, with the exception of the WCW Hardcore Championship, which was won by Terry Funk.

The idea was to get the younger talent over and generate more interest among the younger fans that watched the World Wrestling Federation (WWF) instead of WCW, although it later evolved into a New World Order (nWo) rehash, especially as it followed up to the recent nWo 2000 group. Many argue that a primary reason the WWF defeated WCW in the Monday Night War is because they greatly put over new talent rather than relying so heavily on long-established veterans. As such, this was seen as an overly extreme and late attempt at that strategy.

The feuds continued for another month or so before both factions disbanded due to WCW management deciding the angle was not working due to it backfiring, as the Millionaire's Club got most of the positive fan reaction.

The true end of the angle occurred on July 9 at Bash at the Beach, after Russo's infamous worked shoot promo, which caused Hulk Hogan and Bischoff to leave the promotion. However, the New Blood theme continued in WCW coinciding with the New Blood Rising pay-per-view in August 2000.

== Members ==
| * | Founding member |
| I-II | Leader(s) |

| Member | | Joined | Left |
|---|---|---|---|
| Jim Duggan | * | April 10, 2000 | June 2000 |
| Ric Flair (co-leader) | *I | April 10, 2000 | June 12, 2000 |
| Hulk Hogan (co-leader) | *II | April 10, 2000 | July 9, 2000 |
| Kevin Nash | * | April 10, 2000 | July 9, 2000 |
| Diamond Dallas Page | * | April 10, 2000 | June 12, 2000 |
| Kimberly Page | * | April 10, 2000 | April 16, 2000 |
| Sting | * | April 10, 2000 | July 9, 2000 |
| Sid Vicious | * | April 10, 2000 | July 9, 2000 |
| Curt Hennig | * | April 10, 2000 | May 7, 2000 |
| Lex Luger | * | April 10, 2000 | May 29, 2000 |
| Elizabeth | * | April 10, 2000 | May 29, 2000 |
| Brian Adams | | May 1, 2000 | July 9, 2000 |
| Bryan Clark | | May 1, 2000 | July 9, 2000 |
| Randy Savage | | May 3, 2000 | May 3, 2000 |
| Scott Steiner | | May 15, 2000 | June 11, 2000 |
| Goldberg | | May 29, 2000 | June 11, 2000 |

== Championships and accomplishments ==
- World Championship Wrestling
  - WCW World Heavyweight Championship (4 times) – Ric Flair (2), Kevin Nash (1), Diamond Dallas Page (1)
  - WCW United States Heavyweight Championship (1 time) – Scott Steiner
  - WCW World Tag Team Championship (1 time) – KroniK
