= Lance Storm =

Canadian professional wrestler and trainer (born 1969)

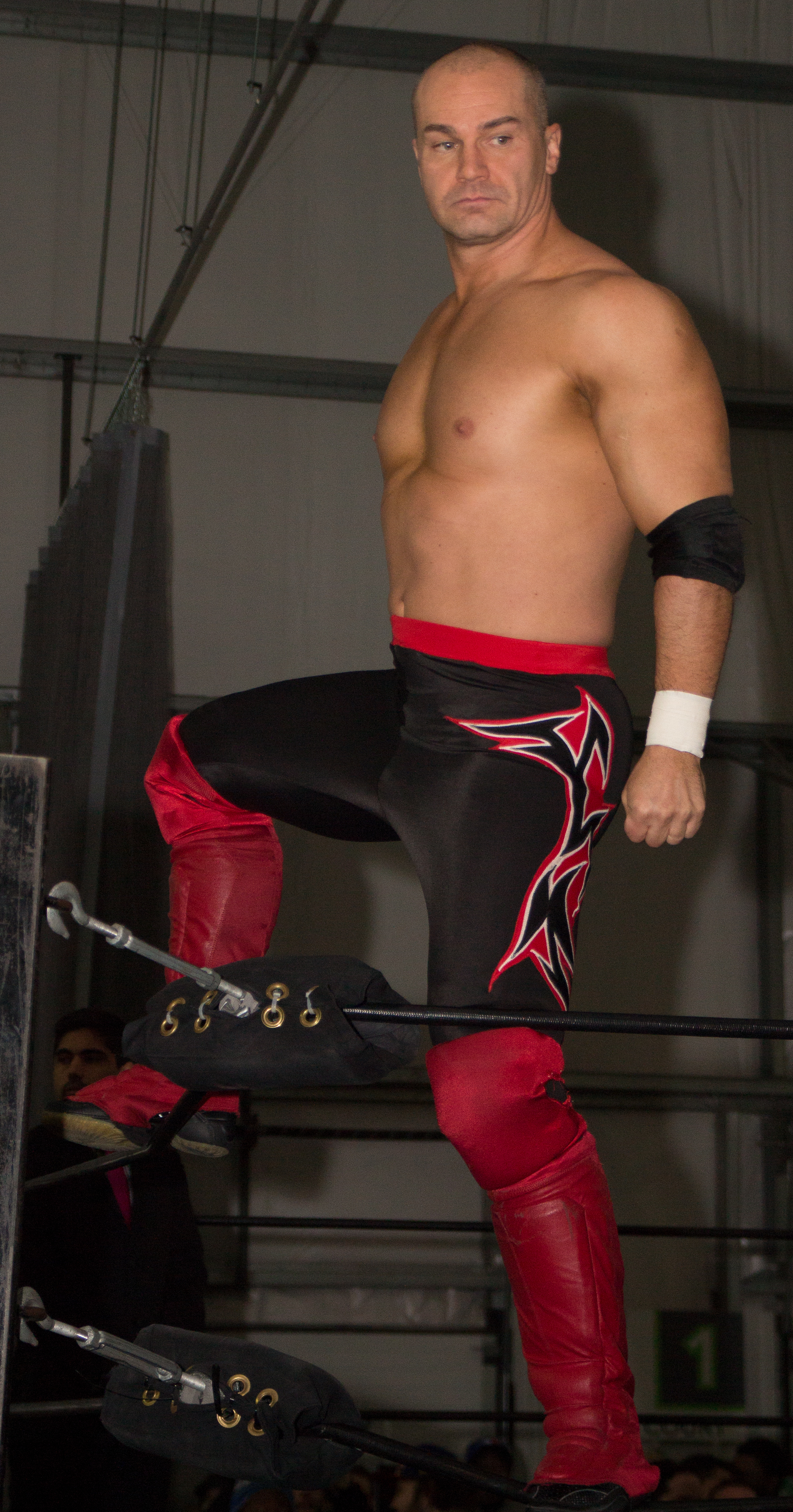
- Storm in 2013

Personal information
- Born: Lance Timothy Evers; April 3, 1969 (age 57) Sarnia, Ontario, Canada
- Education: Wilfrid Laurier University
- Spouse: Tina Evers (m. 1994)
- Children: 2
- Website: stormwrestling.com

Professional wrestling career
- Ring name(s): The Ideal Canadian; Lance Storm; Lance T. Storm; The SWA Kid
- Billed height: 5 ft 11 in (180 cm)
- Billed weight: 231 lb (105 kg)
- Billed from: Calgary, Alberta, Canada
- Trained by: Ed Langley; Stu Hart
- Debut: October 2, 1990
- Retired: April 2, 2016

Lance Timothy Evers (/ˈɛvərs/; born April 3, 1969), known professionally by his ring name Lance Storm, is a Canadian retired professional wrestler. He is signed to Total Nonstop Action Wrestling (TNA), where he works as a producer. Storm is best known for his tenures in Extreme Championship Wrestling (ECW), World Championship Wrestling (WCW), and the World Wrestling Federation (WWF)/World Wrestling Entertainment (WWE), where he held a combined 14 total championships.

Storm began his career in 1990, training with Chris Jericho. They worked together in Frontier Martial-Arts Wrestling and Smoky Mountain Wrestling, forming a tag team known as "Sudden Impact" or "the Thrillseekers". From 1995 to 1998, Storm wrestled in Japan for WAR. In 1997, he joined ECW, where he teamed with Chris Candido and Justin Credible, holding the ECW World Tag Team Championship twice. In 2000, he signed with WCW, where he held the WCW United States Championship, WCW Cruiserweight Championship, and WCW Hardcore Championship simultaneously and helmed the Team Canada faction. Upon the acquisition of WCW by the WWF in 2001, Storm's contract was acquired by the WWF (later WWE); he went on to be a member of the Alliance and the Un-Americans, and held the WWF Intercontinental Championship and World Tag Team Championship. After leaving the WWF in 2005, Storm wrestled sporadically on the independent circuit until retiring in 2016, as well as operating a professional wrestling school, the Storm Wrestling Academy. He joined TNA in 2022.

== Early life ==
Lance Timothy Evers was born in Sarnia, Ontario, Canada, on April 3, 1969. Evers graduated from West Ferris Secondary School in North Bay, Ontario, and attended Wilfrid Laurier University School of Business and Economics in Waterloo, playing volleyball throughout.

== Professional wrestling career ==
=== Early career (1990–1994) ===
Lance Storm was trained by Ed Langley and Brad Young of the Hart Brothers Wrestling Camp at the Silver Dollar Action Centre in Calgary, where he became friends with fellow student Chris Jericho. Jericho has stated that despite the name of the school, the only involvement any of the Hart brothers had in their training was a "thirty-minute cameo" by Keith Hart to collect the student's fees.

Storm wrestled his debut match on October 2, 1990 in Ponoka, Alberta for the Canadian Wrestling Connection; wrestling "Lance T. Storm", he went to a time limit draw with Jericho. He spent the next year wrestling on the independent circuit in Canada, appearing with promotions such as Canadian Rocky Mountain Wrestling. In October 1991, Storm and Jericho toured Japan with Atsushi Onita's Frontier Martial-Arts Wrestling promotion; teaming as "Sudden Impact".

=== Catch Wrestling Association (1993, 1995) ===
From June to October 1993, Storm wrestled in Austria and Germany for Otto Wanz's Catch Wrestling Association (CWA), holding the CWA World Junior Heavyweight Championship on two occasions.

He returned in September 1995 when he feuded with Fit Finlay and Danny Boy Collins. He left in October 1995.

=== Smoky Mountain Wrestling (1994) ===
In March 1994, Storm and Chris Jericho began wrestling for Jim Cornette's Appalachia-based Smoky Mountain Wrestling (SMW) promotion as the Thrillseekers, a "pretty boy" babyface tag team. Over the following months, they faced teams such as the Masked Infernos, Well Dunn, and the Batten Twins. In August 1994 at "The Night of the Legends", the Thrillseekers defeated the Heavenly Bodies in a street fight. Prior to the match, Jericho had suffered a broken arm while practicing a shooting star press in the ring; following the match, he left SMW.

After Jericho's departure, Storm remained in SMW as a singles wrestler. In August 1994, he defeated Chris Candido for the vacant SMW Beat the Champ Television Championship. He lost the title to Boo Bradley the following month. In November 1994, he formed a short-lived tag team with Brian Lee. He left SMW later that month.

=== WAR (1995–1998) ===
In November 1995, Storm began wrestling in Japan for Genichiro Tenryu's WAR promotion. Upon his debut, he formed a tag team with Yuji Yasuraoka. In January 1996, he unsuccessfully challenged Último Dragón for the WAR International Junior Heavyweight Championship in Tokyo's Korakuen Hall. In February 1996, Storm and Yasuraoka lost to Gedo and Lion Do in a bout for the vacant WAR International Junior Heavyweight Tag Team Championship. The following month, Storm and Yasuraoka defeated Gedo and Lion Do to win the titles. In June 1996, Storm and Yasuraoka defended the titles against El Samurai and Norio Honaga at New Japan Pro-Wrestling's The Skydiving-J event (a showcase of junior heavyweight wrestlers from various different promotions). They held the titles until July 1996, when they lost to El Samurai and Jushin Liger at the WAR 4th Anniversary Show in Tokyo's Ryōgoku Kokugikan. In November 1996, they defeated Liger and Samurai to regain the titles; their second reign ended in March 1997 when they lost to Choden Senshi Battle Ranger and Masaaki Mochizuki.

In June 1997 at the WAR 5th Anniversary Show in the Ryōgoku Kokugikan, Storm teamed with Koki Kitahara and Nobutaka Araya to defeat Mitsuharu Kitao, Nobukazu Hirai, and Tommy Dreamer for the vacant WAR World Six-Man Tag Team Championship. They held the titles until October 1997, when they lost to Hirai, Kitao, and Masaaki Mochizuki. Storm made his final appearance with WAR in January 1998.

=== Extreme Championship Wrestling (1997–2000) ===
==== Teaming and feuding with Chris Candido (1997–1998) ====
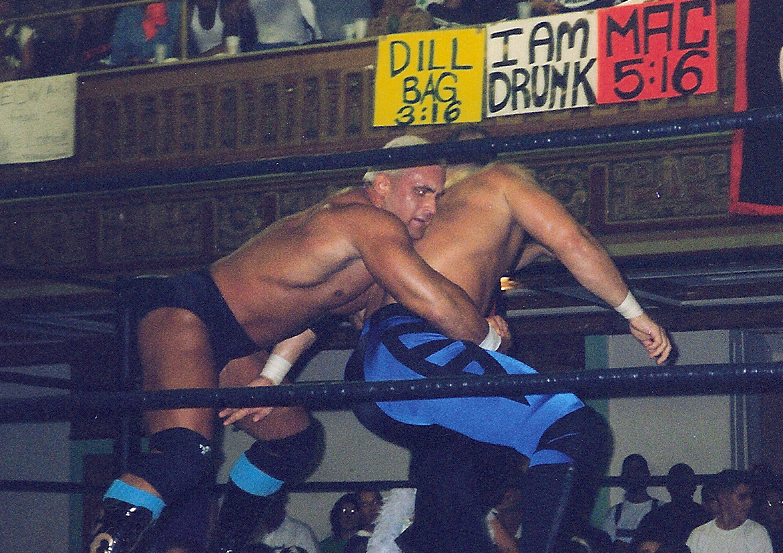
Storm (right) wrestling Chris Candido

In February 1997, Storm joined Extreme Championship Wrestling (ECW), making his debut at Crossing the Line Again against Balls Mahoney. Early in his ECW career, he took part in a match against Rob Van Dam at Barely Legal where he was booed by the crowd for two visibly "weak" chair shots to Van Dam. At Heat Wave, Storm faced Taz for the ECW World Television Championship but failed to win the title.

At November to Remember in November 1997, Storm and Chris Candido defeated Tommy Rogers and Jerry Lynn. The following month, at Better Than Ever, Storm and Candido won the ECW World Tag Team Championship from the Can-Am Express. Despite being the champions, the duo retained a rivalry and at CyberSlam in February 1998, Storm defeated Candido. At Living Dangerously in March 1998, Storm and Al Snow defeated Shane Douglas and Candido. At Wrestlepalooza in May 1998, Storm and Candido defeated Axl Rotten and Balls Mahoney to retain the ECW World Tag Team Championship. In June 1998, Storm and Candido lost the ECW World Tag Team Championship to Sabu and Rob Van Dam.

On the July 22, 1998 episode of ECW Hardcore TV, Storm walked out on Candido during a title match against Sabu and Van Dam, thus ending their team and beginning a feud between the two men. On the September 5, 1998 episode of Hardcore TV, Storm introduced his valet Tammy Lynn Bytch, a parody of Candido's girlfriend Tammy Lynn Sytch, who appeared in ECW to side with Candido and feuded with Bytch. Storm and Candido feuded until late 1998. At November to Remember, Storm defeated Jerry Lynn with Mikey Whipwreck as special guest referee.

==== Impact Players (1999–2000) ====
Following his feud with Candido, Storm joined forces with his trainee Justin Credible in February 1999 at Crossing the Line '99. The duo formed a tag team named The Impact Players. At Living Dangerously, The Impact Players faced Tommy Dreamer and Shane Douglas in a losing effort. The stable joined Storm and his valet (now renamed Dawn Marie) with Credible and his manager Jason. They first feuded with Jerry Lynn and Sabu in singles matches and by late 1999, they had begun a violent feud with Tommy Dreamer and The Sandman. The team brutalized many singles stars during this period as well. At Hardcore Heaven, Storm defeated Tommy Dreamer. At Heat Wave, The Impact Players faced Rob Van Dam and Jerry Lynn in a losing effort. At Anarchy Rulz, Storm defeated Jerry Lynn. At November to Remember, The Impact Players and Rhino defeated Raven, Tommy Dreamer and The Sandman in the night's main event.

At Guilty as Charged, The Impact Players defeated Tommy Dreamer and Raven for their first of two ECW World Tag Team Championship reigns. After losing the titles to Tommy Dreamer and Masato Tanaka they won them back at Living Dangerously where The Impact Players defeated Raven and Mike Awesome and Tommy Dreamer and Masato Tanaka in a Three-Way Dance. However they lost the titles to Tommy Dreamer and Masato Tanaka on February 26, 2000. During this time, Storm also gained a position as a booker in ECW and had a hand in much of the product content on television and pay-per-view. At Hardcore Heaven, Storm challenged his former tag team partner Justin Credible for the ECW World Heavyweight Championship but failed to win the title. After the company began to suffer financial hardships, Storm left ECW for World Championship Wrestling (WCW) in order to support his family.

=== World Championship Wrestling (2000–2001) ===
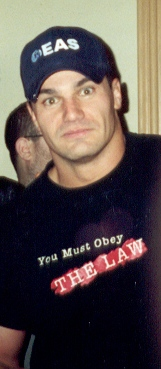
Storm in 2001

Storm left ECW in May 2000 to join WCW, where he became a singles wrestler. He made his first appearance on the June 19, 2000 episode of Nitro and quickly became one of WCW's most prominent stars, winning the WCW United States Heavyweight Championship, the Cruiserweight Championship, and the WCW Hardcore Championship in rapid succession, resulting in Storm becoming the first and only wrestler in WCW history to hold three titles simultaneously. As an affront to the fans, he renamed the titles to the Canadian Heavyweight Championship, 100 kg and Under Championship, and Saskatchewan Hardcore International Title (S.H.I.T.), respectively, complete with large Canadian flag stickers that covered the belts' faceplates. Storm then formed the group called Team Canada in Vancouver, British Columbia, Canada during New Blood Rising on August 13, where he defended the WCW United States Heavyweight Championship in a match with Mike Awesome. The match was refereed by the Canadian Jacques Rougeau, who enabled Storm to defeat Awesome and retain his title by constantly changing the rules. Following the match, the semi-retired Canadian wrestler Bret Hart came to the ring and hugged Storm and Rougeau. At Fall Brawl on September 17, Storm defeated General Rection with Jim Duggan as the referee, with Duggan turning on M.I.A and joining Team Canada. He also attempted to win the World Heavyweight Championship, but was defeated by champion Booker T on each occasion. Storm eventually awarded the Cruiserweight and Hardcore titles by presenting them to his Team Canada stablemates Elix Skipper and Carl Ouellet, respectively. At Halloween Havoc on October 29, Storm and Jim Duggan lost to General Rection in a Handicap match losing the WCW United States Heavyweight Championship and to free Major Gunns from Team Canada. On the November 13 edition of Nitro, Storm defeated General Rection to win the WCW United States Heavyweight Championship back. At Mayhem on November 26, General Rection defeated Storm for the title. At Starrcade on December 17, Storm defeated Ernest Miller.

Storm's stable Team Canada feuded with General Rection's stable, the Misfits In Action, for several months. At Sin on January 14, 2001, Team Canada (Lance Storm, Mike Awesome and Elix Skipper) (with Major Gunns) defeated The Filthy Animals (Konnan, Rey Mysterio, Jr. and Billy Kidman) (with Tygress) in a Penalty Box match with Jim Duggan as special guest referee. In particular, Storm and Rection feuded with each other over Storm's "Canadian" Heavyweight Title, which Rection finally won and promptly returned to the United States Heavyweight Title name. At SuperBrawl Revenge on February 18, Storm faced The Cat where he lost and The Cat became the new Commissioner of WCW. At WCW's final PPV Greed on March 18, Team Canada (Lance Storm and Mike Awesome) defeated Konnan and Hugh Morrus. The pay-per-view event took place eight days before the final episode of Nitro and three days before the final episode of Thunder. On the final episode of Nitro, Team Canada (Lance Storm and Mike Awesome) challenged for the WCW World Tag Team Championship against Sean O'Haire and Chuck Palumbo but failed to win the titles.

=== World Wrestling Federation / World Wrestling Entertainment (2001–2005) ===
==== The Alliance (2001–2002) ====
When WCW was purchased by the World Wrestling Federation (WWF) in 2001, Storm's contract was kept and he became a WWF employee. Storm, portrayed as a serious, humourless heel, was in The Alliance and was the first WCW superstar to ever invade a WWF program, where he debuted on the May 28, 2001 episode of WWF Raw is War. At Invasion on July 22, Storm and Mike Awesome faced Edge and Christian in a losing effort. Storm received a modest push during the Invasion angle, as he would go on to win the WWF Intercontinental Championship from Albert on the July 23 episode of Raw is War. He lost the title a month later to Edge at SummerSlam on August 19. Storm formed a tag team with The Hurricane and feuded with the Hardy Boyz (Jeff and Matt) over the WWF and WCW Tag Team Titles for the next few months; at Unforgiven on September 23, Storm and The Hurricane competed in a Fatal Four-Way Elimination match for the WWF Tag Team Championship but failed to win, this later included a match for the WCW Tag Team Championship against the Hardy Boyz at No Mercy on October 21, which Storm and The Hurricane lost. Eventually, at Rebellion on November 3, Storm and Justin Credible faced Billy and Chuck in a losing effort. At Survivor Series on November 18, Storm competed in an Immunity Battle Royal that was won by Test, where the winner could not be fired for a year. However, Team Alliance lost in the main event and Storm was fired (in storyline) along with the rest of the Alliance roster by Vince McMahon. Storm eventually got his job back officially on the December 17 edition of Raw when he defeated The Rock with help from Test in a match that earned him a WWF contract. On the December 27 episode of SmackDown!, Storm and Kurt Angle lost to The Rock and Rob Van Dam.

Storm remained a heel and on the January 17, 2002 edition of SmackDown!, Storm and Christian faced Rikishi in a 2 on 1 Over The Top Rope Challenge which Rikishi won. At the Royal Rumble on January 20, Storm competed in the Royal Rumble match where he was eliminated by Al Snow. At No Way Out on February 17, Storm and Christian competed in a Tag Team Turmoil match which was won by The APA.

==== The Un-Americans (2002) ====
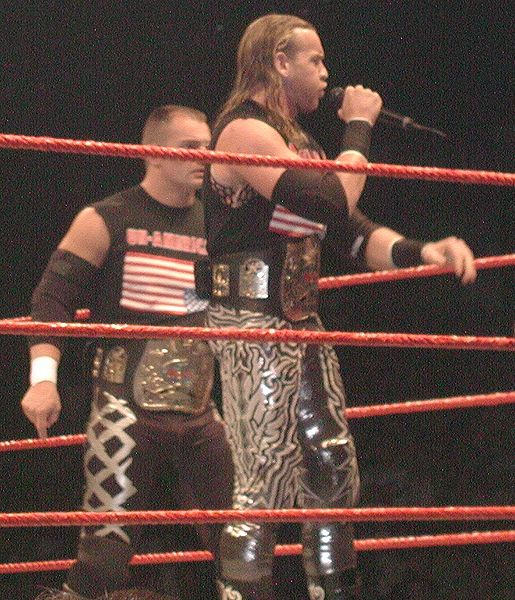
Storm and Christian during their WWE Tag Team Championship reign as The Un-Americans

On the March 25, 2002 episode of Raw, Storm was drafted to the SmackDown! brand as part of the 2002 WWF draft lottery.

In June, Storm formed The Un-Americans with Christian and Test. On July 21 at Vengeance, Storm and Christian won the WWE Tag Team Championship by defeating Hollywood Hulk Hogan and Edge. On the July 29 episode of Raw, The Un-Americans joined the Raw brand, bringing the WWE Tag Team Championship to Raw in the process. On the August 5 edition of Raw, Storm and Christian retained the WWE Tag Team Championship against The Hardy Boyz by disqualification. On the August 12 edition of Raw, The Un-Americans and Triple H defeated Booker T, The Undertaker, Goldust and The Rock in an 8-man tag team match. At SummerSlam on August 25, Storm and Christian defeated Booker T and Goldust to retain the WWE Tag Team Championship. On the September 9 edition of Raw, Storm and Christian defeated Kane and Bradshaw to retain the WWE Tag Team Championship when Regal hit Bradshaw with a pair of brass knuckles and joined the group. At Unforgiven on September 22, The Un-Americans (Storm, Christian, Regal, and Test) faced Kane, Goldust, Booker T, and Bubba Ray Dudley in a losing effort. Storm and Christian lost the WWE Tag Team Championship to Kane and The Hurricane on the September 23 episode of Raw.

The Un-Americans broke apart on the September 30 episode of Raw after they each lost their respective matches, leading to a brawl involving all the members of the group.

==== Various feuds (2002–2005) ====
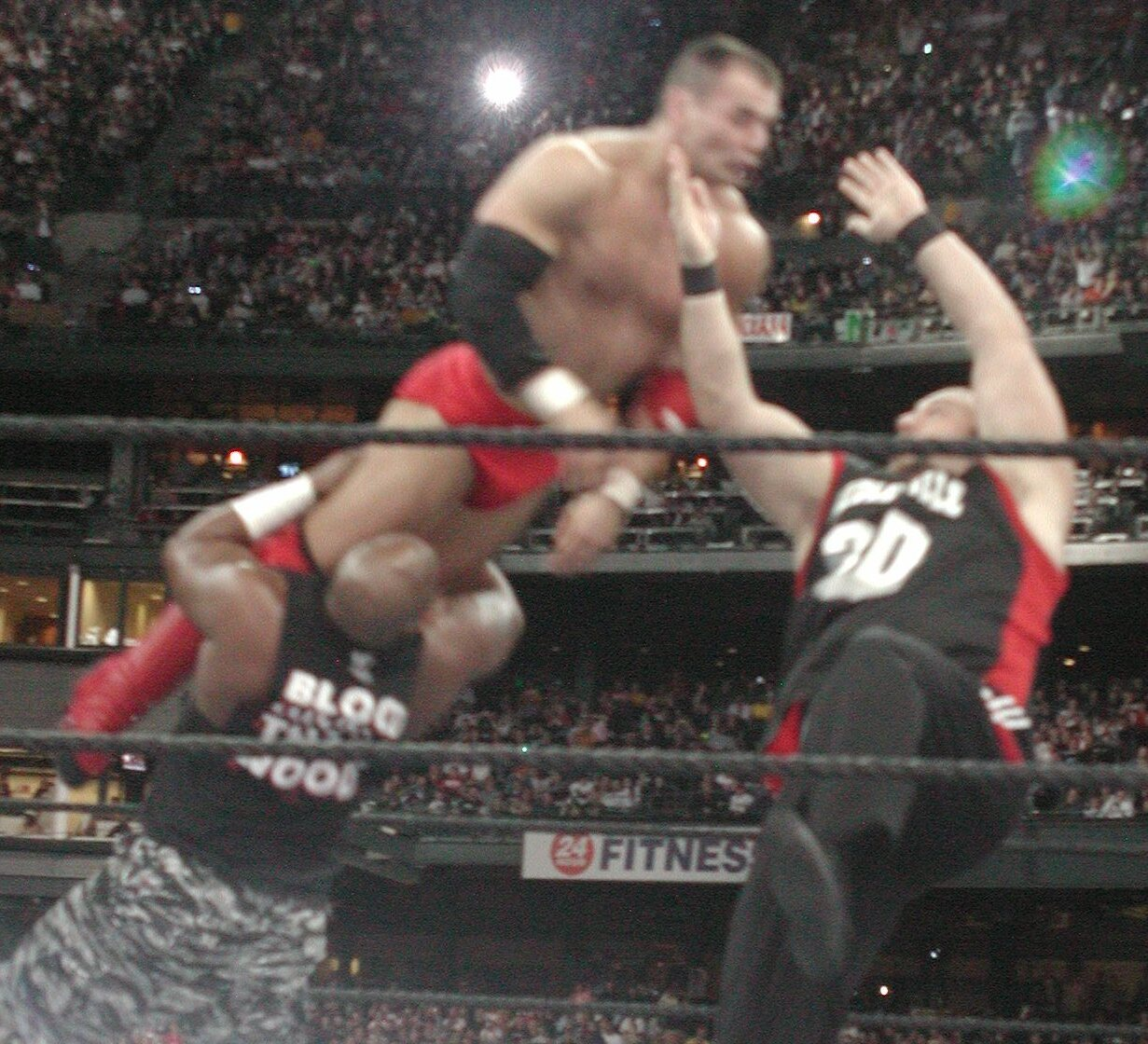
Storm receiving a 3D from the Dudley Boyz in March 2003

Storm continued teaming with Regal as a regular tag team with the same anti-American gimmick; Storm would represent Canada and Regal represented England. At Armageddon on December 15, Storm and Regal competed in a fatal-four-way tag team elimination match for the World Tag Team Championship but failed to win the titles. The next month, the duo won the World Tag Team Championship on two separate occasions. The first was by defeating Booker T and Goldust on the January 6, 2003 episode of Raw with help from Chief Morley, who was appointed "Raw Chief of Staff", but they lost the title at the Royal Rumble on January 19 to The Dudley Boyz. Storm and Regal began their second reign as World Tag Team Champions the next night on Raw by defeating the Dudley Boyz with help from Morley again. At No Way Out on February 23, Storm and Regal defeated Kane and Rob Van Dam to retain the titles. On the March 24 episode of Raw, Morley announced that since the belts had not been defended in 30 days due to Regal's legitimate health problems, the duo would be stripped of the title. Morley immediately named himself and Lance Storm the new World Tag Team Champions starting Storm's fourth tag team title reign. The following week on the March 31 episode of Raw, Storm and Morley faced Kane and Rob Van Dam and The Dudley Boyz in a 3-Way Elimination match, dropping the titles to Kane and Van Dam. At Judgment Day on May 18, Storm competed in a Battle Royal for the vacant WWE Intercontinental Championship which was won by Christian.

From there, Storm was briefly involved in a storyline in which Stone Cold Steve Austin, an authority figure, encouraged the fans to chant "boring" during Storm's matches including one with Storm losing to newcomer Garrison Cade on the June 16 episode of Raw thanks to Austin bringing out a pillow and blanket and snoring loudly into the microphone, and other distracting antics. Storm eventually found help from Goldust who helped improve Storm's charisma, which eventually turned Storm into a face and Storm started dancing. He soon rejoined Morley, who had also become a face and reverted to his Val Venis character. Their reformed team began entering the ring with very attractive women but this time their tag team never got a push. Storm and Goldust then began teaming together for a short period of time. At Armageddon on December 14, Storm and Val Venis competed in a Tag Team Turmoil match for the World Tag Team Championship which was won by Ric Flair and Batista. From December 2003 to March 2004, Storm mainly competed on Sunday Night Heat.

Storm eventually turned heel once again by betraying the fans. This happened when he told them of how he was sick and tired of pleasing them with his dancing and how it was just a waste of his time on an episode of Raw following the 2004 WWE draft lottery, only to be squashed by Rhyno immediately thereafter. This would turn out to be Storm's last appearance on Raw.

In April 2004, Storm chose to retire from in-ring action. His last match was on April 19, 2004, and he defeated Steven Richards at the Calgary Saddledome. He then accepted a position backstage with WWE, working as a wrestling trainer in Ohio Valley Wrestling, WWE's main developmental territory.

On March 23, 2005, Storm came out of retirement to participate in a six-man tag team match with Joey Mercury and Johnny Nitro against fellow ECW alumni Tommy Dreamer and the Dudley Boyz. On April 9, 2005, in Cloverport, Kentucky, Storm teamed with Matt Cappotelli to face Mercury and Nitro.

Storm resigned from WWE in May 2005 and announced that he intended to open his own training school in his hometown of Calgary, the Storm Wrestling Academy, with the first semester beginning in September 2005. He returned to WWE for one night on May 30, 2005, and faced Maven on Sunday Night Heat. Storm wrestled one last time on a WWE-promoted show at ECW One Night Stand on June 12, 2005, where he defeated his close friend and former tag team partner Chris Jericho with the help of Justin Credible.

=== Late career (2005–2016) ===
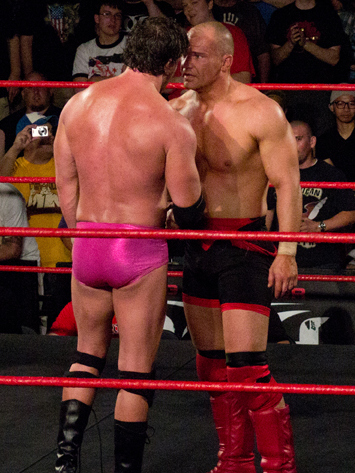
Storm (right) facing off against Mike Bennett at Showdown in the Sun in 2012

At Hardcore Homecoming on November 4, 2005, in Philadelphia, Pennsylvania, Storm interfered in a steel cage match between Justin Credible and Jerry Lynn, helping Credible defeat Lynn. At the December 3, 2005 Ring of Honor show Steel Cage Warfare in New York, New York, Storm congratulated World Champion Bryan Danielson following a successful title defense against Rocky Romero. On April 1, 2006, at Better Than Our Best, Storm returned to Ring of Honor to face Danielson for the World Championship in Chicago, Illinois. Prior to the event, Storm commended Bryan Danielson and said that he is the one person to make him come out of retirement. Danielson defeated Storm by submission to retain the championship. ROH fans were appreciative of Storm's efforts and chanted "You've still got it" as a tribute.

May 26 and 27 saw Storm work for the United Kingdom-based wrestling promotion One Pro Wrestling (1PW). On May 26, he teamed with Andy Boy Simmonz, who substituted for Justin Credible due to Credible missing a flight, in a first round match of the Tag Team Championship tournament. Storm and Simmonz lost to eventual finalists A.J. Styles and Christopher Daniels. The next night, Storm lost to Doug Williams in a singles match.

Storm has made rare indy appearances for Northern Ontario-based promotion Blood, Sweat & Ears. On December 3, 2006, in Mississauga, Ontario, he lost to Christian Cage and suffered a throat injury due to a stiff clothesline. On July 21, 2007, he defeated Christopher Daniels before defeating Robert Roode on August 11, 2007.

On July 3, 2009, it was announced that Storm would be coming out of retirement to perform at two Ring of Honor shows on July 24 and 25, Death Before Dishonor VII: Nights 1 and 2 respectively. On July 24, Storm and fellow Canadian Kevin Steen defeated Chris Hero and Davey Richards and on July 25, Storm was defeated by Hero in a one-on-one grudge match. Following the match, Storm cut an emotional promo, and later announced his belief that this would be his last match, saying "I shared this match with people who share my love and respect for this business, and I am now home being Lance Evers with the family I will share the rest of my life with. I still have my school, and I will always be a part of this business, but I truly believe I am now done as a performer. They say, never say never in this business, and because of that I won’t, but I think I left it all in the ring that night and I believe I wrote the final page in the 19-year long book that was the career of Lance Storm."

In November 2009, Lance Storm announced he had accepted the position as the head booker of the Prairie Wrestling Alliance, a promotion that operates out of Edmonton. PWA and the Storm Wrestling Academy had also begun working together very closely.

On April 3, 2010, Storm came out of retirement to wrestle his friend Bryan Alvarez at a Tulalip Championship Wrestling event. Storm was defeated in the match, which he wrestled under a mask as The Ideal Canadian. On March 19, 2011, Storm made a return to the ring at PWA's 10th anniversary show, teaming with Brother Devon in a tag team match, where they defeated Bully Ray and Dylan Knight. On August 27, 2011, Storm came out of retirement to work a short match with Tommy Dreamer. Storm returned to ROH again on March 30, 2012, for the Showdown in the Sun pay-per-view, losing to Mike Bennett when Maria Kanellis interfered. He wrestled Bennett again at the following ROH PPV, Border Wars, this time coming out victorious. At the June 29 tapings of Ring of Honor Wrestling, Bennett defeated Storm following interference from "Brutal" Bob and Maria in the final match of their trilogy.

On January 18, 2013, Storm worked for the Hart Legacy promotion in Calgary, taking part in a six-man tag team match, where Storm and the Killer Elite Squad (Davey Boy Smith, Jr. and Lance Archer) defeated Bobby Lashley, Chris Masters and Johnny Devine. On June 22, Storm worked for the House of Hardcore promotion, losing to its founder Tommy Dreamer in a main event singles match. On November 9, 2013, Storm and Sean Waltman were defeated by Dreamer and Terry Funk at House of Hardcore 3. On June 14, 2014, Storm faced Mike Bennett in a losing effort at House of Hardcore 6.

On December 15, 2013, Storm was defeated by Chris Hero at a Smash Wrestling event. On December 21, 2013, Storm defeated Dan Collins at an EWP Wrestling event. on September 20, 2014, Storm and Justin Credible faced Alex and Kyle Reynolds for the PWS tag team championship but failed to win the titles. On October 3, 2015, at WWE's Live from MSG special event, Storm was acknowledged in the crowd by Chris Jericho, thus making his first WWE appearance since 2005.

On March 16, 2016, Storm challenged Jay Lethal for the ROH World Championship in a losing effort for the Prairie Wrestling Alliance (PWA) 15th Anniversary Show.

On April 2, 2016, Storm, managed by Missy Hyatt, challenged Matt Hardy for the OMEGA Heavyweight Championship in a losing effort, in what would be his final match.

=== Impact Wrestling (2019) ===
In March 2019, Storm revealed he was working with Impact Wrestling as a producer. He was the special guest referee for the World Championship match involving Johnny Impact and Brian Cage, with Cage winning to become the new champion.

=== Return to WWE (2019–2020) ===
On November 2, 2019, Storm announced that he was returning to WWE to work as a producer. On the February 7, 2020 episode of SmackDown he appeared in a prerecorded video shown during "The Dirt Sheet".

Storm was furloughed from the company on April 15, 2020, due to COVID-19 cutbacks.

=== Return to Impact / Total Nonstop Action Wrestling (2022–present) ===
In February 2022, it was announced that Storm would be returning to Impact Wrestling as a producer.

== Other media ==
Storm wrote a monthly column for British wrestling and MMA publication Fighting Spirit magazine. Since 2005, Lance has been a regular guest on podcasts available through the Figure Four Weekly / Wrestling Observer web site, as well as a frequent guest on the nationally airing Wrestling Observer Live radio show. In 2011, Storm and ten of his Storm Wrestling Academy students were featured in a ten-part reality television show, World of Hurt, which premiered on The Cave on May 1. In 2011, Storm published an E-book for the Amazon Kindle, titled Storm Warning, which is a collection of columns from his website. He later released a second volume, titled Storm Front which covers stories from his WWE career from 2001 to 2004.

Storm has made appearances on the WWE Network original The Edge and Christian Show, first playing the role of representative of WWE's PG department, then appearing briefly on the season finale. Storm has appeared two WWE video games in WWE SmackDown! Shut Your Mouth and WWE SmackDown! Here Comes The Pain during the final and second run with WWE.

On October 18, 2016, Storm debuted a new podcast with longtime friend Don Callis called Killing the Town with Storm and Cyrus. The show is part of The Jericho Network on PodcastOne. The podcast ended in 2019

== Filmography ==
Film
Year	Title	Role	Notes
2012	Bending the Rules	Dojo Student	Uncredited
2016	Chokeslam	Pit Stank	
2019	Damnation		

Television
Year	Title	Role	Notes
2014	The Gym	Himself	Episode 8: "The Marketing Storm"
2016	The Edge and Christian Show That Totally Reeks of Awesomeness	Himself	3 episodes
2020	Corner Gas Animated	Lance Fury	Voice; Season 3 episode 4: "Sound and Fury

== Video games ==
ECW Video games
Year	Title	Notes
2000	ECW Hardcore Revolution	Video game debut
2000	ECW Anarchy Rulz	

WCW video games
Year	Title	Notes
2000	WCW Backstage Assault	Video game debut

WWE video games
Year	Title	Notes
2001	WWF With Authority!	Video game debut
2002	WWE WrestleMania X8	
2002	WWE SmackDown! Shut Your Mouth	
2003	WWE WrestleMania XIX	
2003	WWE Raw 2	
2003	WWE SmackDown! Here Comes the Pain	
2004	WWE Day of Reckoning	

== Personal life ==
He married his wife Tina in 1994, and they have two daughters.

== Championships and accomplishments ==
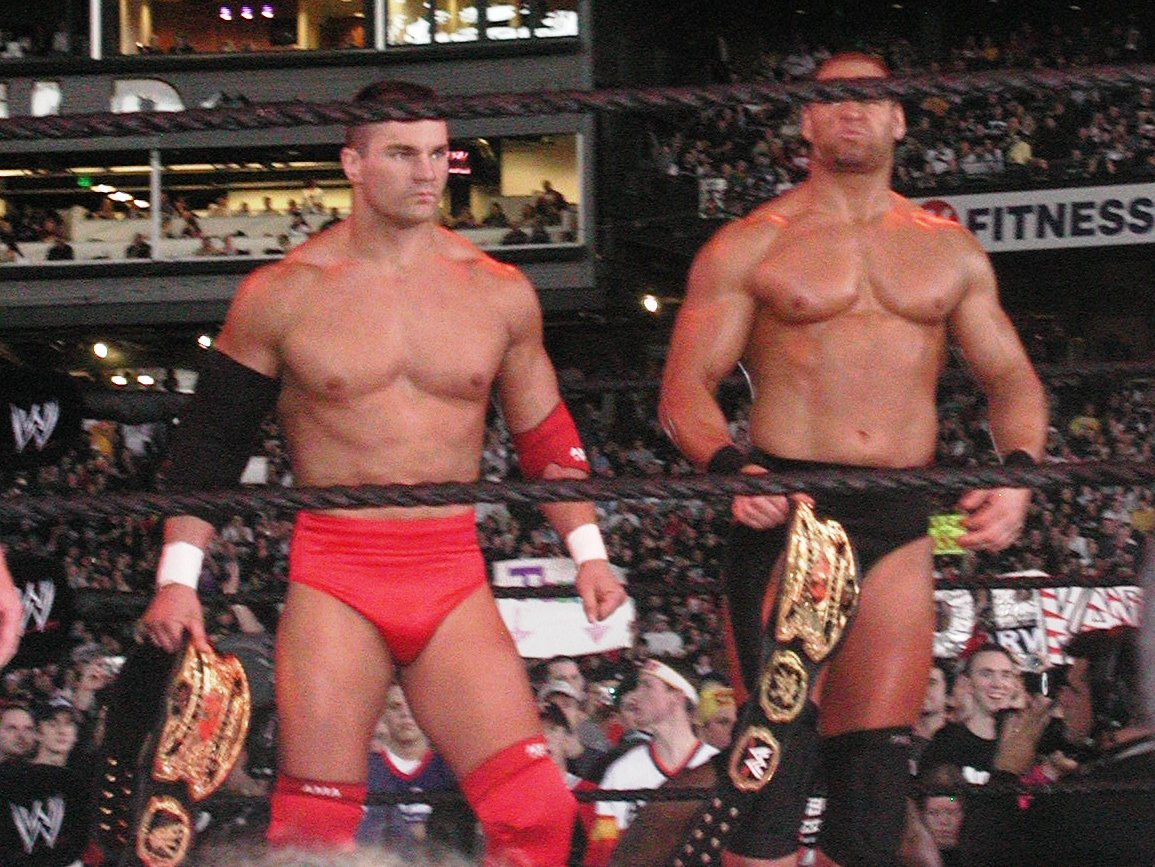
Storm (left) and Chief Morley (right) as the World Tag Team Champions

- Canadian Rocky Mountain Wrestling
  - CRMW Commonwealth Mid-Heavyweight Championship (5 times)
  - CRMW North American Championship (1 time)
  - CRMW North American Tag Team Championship (2 times) – with Chris Jericho
- Canadian Wrestling Connection
  - CWC Heavyweight Championship (1 time)
  - CWC Tag Team Championship (1 time) – with Chris Jericho
  - Royal Rumble (1990)
- Catch Wrestling Association
  - CWA World Junior Heavyweight Championship (2 times)
- Extreme Championship Wrestling
  - ECW World Tag Team Championship (3 times) – with Chris Candido (1) and Justin Credible (2)
- Pro Wrestling Illustrated
  - Ranked No. 13 of the top 500 singles wrestlers in the PWI 500 in 2001
  - Ranked No. 322 of the top 500 singles wrestlers of the PWI Years in 2003
- Smoky Mountain Wrestling
  - SMW Beat the Champ Television Championship (1 time)
- Wrestle Association "R"
  - WAR International Junior Heavyweight Tag Team Championship (2 times) – with Yuji Yasuraoka
  - WAR World Six-Man Tag Team Championship (1 time) – with Kouki Kitahara and Nobutaka Araya
- World Championship Wrestling
  - WCW Hardcore Championship (1 time)
  - WCW Cruiserweight Championship (1 time)
  - WCW United States Heavyweight Championship (3 times)
  - WCW United States Championship Tournament (July 2000)
- World Wrestling Federation / World Wrestling Entertainment
  - WWF Intercontinental Championship (1 time)
  - WWE/World Tag Team Championship (4 times) – with Christian (1), William Regal (2), and Chief Morley (1)
- Wrestling Observer Newsletter
  - Most Underrated (2001)
