= The Un-Americans =

Professional wrestling stable

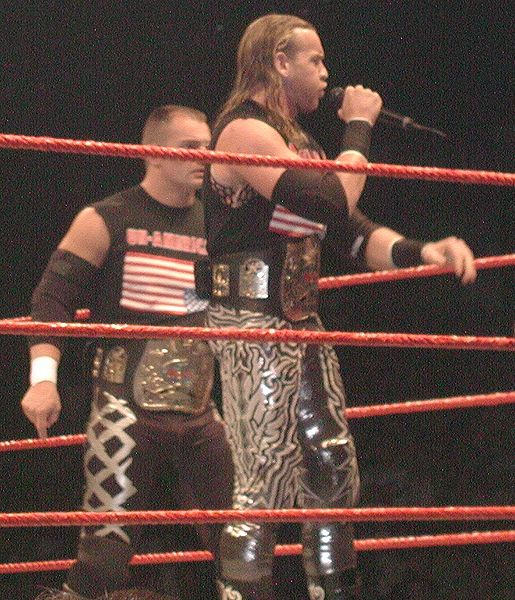
- Lance Storm (left) and Christian (right) as WWE Tag Team Champions

Stable
- Members: (Canada) Christian (Canada) Lance Storm (Canada) Test (United Kingdom) William Regal
- Name(s): The Un-Americans; The Anti-American Mob; The Anti-Americans; C-4
- Debut: June 20, 2002
- Disbanded: September 30, 2002
- Years active: 2002-2003

The Un-Americans (originally known as The Anti-Americans) were a villainous professional wrestling stable in World Wrestling Entertainment (WWE) who were active from 2002 to 2003. The stable was originally composed of three Canadian wrestlers: Lance Storm, Christian and Test. Towards the end of the Un-Americans' existence, the trio was joined by British wrestler William Regal. The group won the World Tag Team Championship three times.

As indicated by the name, the Anti-Americans differed from previous incarnations of Team Canada, a stable that Storm was part of, in that they were anti-American rather than pro-Canadian. As a result of this, the emblem of the stable was not the Canadian flag, but an American flag flown upside down.

== History ==
The Un-Americans were formed on SmackDown! in June 2002 by the Canadian Lance Storm, who had led a similar stable known as Team Canada in World Championship Wrestling (WCW). Storm claimed that World Wrestling Entertainment (WWE) had discriminated against Canadians for years, citing the Montreal Screwjob as an example. Christian (who had teamed with Storm regularly since the fall of the WCW/ECW Alliance) and Test, also Canadian, joined the burgeoning stable later that month. The stable was named "The Anti-Americans" shortly thereafter.

In the lead-up to the formation of the group, each member had suffered a televised loss, decided by the ineptitude of the referee calling the match. Storm lost a tag team match when he used a Bridging German Suplex to pin his opponent Billy Kidman. Storm inadvertently put his own shoulders on the mat, forcing the referee to count a pinfall on both men. Storm managed to raise his shoulder off the mat before Kidman did, but the referee did not see this, and awarded the victory to Kidman's team. In the following weeks, Christian and Test were pinned by their opponents in matches, and the referee failed to see that they were touching the ring-ropes (thus invalidating the pin attempt).

In July, The Anti-Americans began feuding with wrestlers such as Rikishi, fellow Canadian Edge and Hollywood Hulk Hogan. At Vengeance on July 21, Storm and Christian defeated Edge and Hogan to win the WWE Tag Team Championship. They were assisted by Chris Jericho, another Canadian, who both proposed the match to Mr. McMahon, and helped them win it after striking Edge with one of the belts. However, Jericho did not formally join the stable and had only helped due to an ongoing feud with Edge. Original plans, according to Storm, were to have the four Canadians form a group called "C-4", but plans were scrapped before many details could be worked out. In fact, Jericho had jumped to Raw on the same day as the stable, but still did not join them, though he was sometimes regarded as an associate (especially with Christian).

The Anti-Americans then jumped from SmackDown! to Raw on July 29, and immediately began a feud with The Undertaker. Up until this night, the WWE Tag Team Championship was only active on the SmackDown! brand. But when the stable moved to Raw, the titles moved too, forcing the creation of a second tag team championship. This was when Jim Ross started referring to the group as "The Un-Americans". They went on to feud with Booker T and Goldust, who Storm and Christian defeated to retain the WWE Tag Team Championship at SummerSlam on August 25. Later that night, The Undertaker defeated Test in a singles match.

In late August and early September, The Un-Americans attempted on several occasions to burn the American flag, but were thwarted on each occasion by Booker T, Goldust, Kane and Bradshaw. In mid-September, the English William Regal joined the stable. At Unforgiven on September 22, The Un-Americans lost to Booker T, Goldust, Kane and Bubba Ray Dudley in an eight-man tag team match.

The Un-Americans used an upside-down American flag, like the one seen here, as a logo

Storm and Christian lost the WWE Tag Team Championship on the September 23 episode of Raw to Kane and The Hurricane. Following the match, both Storm and Christian blamed one another for the loss. One week later, Storm and Christian were both defeated in singles matches (by the same man, Randy Orton), and Test and Regal lost a tag team match to Rob Van Dam and Tommy Dreamer. The series of losses divided The Un-Americans, and the stable split in brawling fashion.

=== Post-split ===
The stable continued as a tag team featuring Regal and Storm, retaining their anti-American sentiments, although with an emphasis on their respective English and Canadian heritage, regaining the (renamed) World Tag Team Championship on two occasions.

Both Regal and Storm split up in March 2003 after Regal got a heart parasite in India while WWE was on tour (thus permanently disbanding the team). They were still champions when Regal got sick and the titles were vacated. He was replaced by Chief Morley who declared himself and Storm the new World Tag Team Champions. They dropped the titles to Kane and Rob Van Dam on the March 31 episode of Raw. Morley was never a member of the Un-Americans, even though Morley is Canadian.

Meanwhile, Test took on Stacy Keibler as a manager, and turned face. Christian went on to team with Jericho and serve as Jericho's side-kick and partner. On the June 23, 2003 episode of Raw, The Un-Americans (Christian and Test) reunited for one night only to take on Booker T and Scott Steiner in a winning effort.

It was commented by Michael Hayes during a segment of "The Legends of Wrestling" - Patriotism, that everyone in the Un-Americans were afraid of the "heat" brought on by the angle. Regal was remarked to be the only one who was not and due to that, the angle was short-lived. Storm later denied this claim.

Storm worked for the company until retiring from professional wrestling in April 2004 and became a trainer for a wrestling school in Calgary. He returned to WWE for two appearances in May 2005 and fought against Chris Jericho at ECW One Night Stand. Storm once again retired in 2007 and returned to the sport in 2009 until his last match in 2016. In 2019 he returned to WWE as a producer and was released by WWE on April 15, 2020, due to budget cuts from the COVID-19 pandemic.

Test would stay with WWE until November 2004. He went to wrestle for other promotions in the United States, Nu-Wrestling in Italy, and World Series Wrestling in Australia. He returned to WWE in March 2006 and was released less than a year later in February 2007. He would afterwards continue to wrestle for other wrestling promotions. He died on March 13, 2009, of a drug overdose.

Christian became a four-time Intercontinental Champion winning his second (he won his first at Unforgiven in September 2001, nine months before the stable's formation) at Judgment Day in May 2003. He stayed with the company until November 2005 when he went to Total Nonstop Action Wrestling (TNA) and became a main eventer winning the NWA World Heavyweight Championship on two occasions in 2006 and 2007. He left TNA in January 2009 after his contract expired and returned to WWE a month later. He won the ECW Championship and the World Heavyweight Championship on two occasions each in 2009 and 2011 respectively. He retired from professional wrestling in 2014 after years of concussions. However, he signed with All Elite Wrestling (AEW) in 2021.

Regal returned to professional wrestling in April 2004 and was the general manager of Raw from August 2007 until May 2008. He retired from professional wrestling in December 2013 then he took up the role in NXT from July 2014 until his departure in January 2022. He would sign with AEW soon afterwards before returning to the WWE a year later.

== Championships and accomplishments ==
- World Wrestling Entertainment
  - World Tag Team Championship (3 times) - Christian and Lance Storm (1), William Regal and Lance Storm (2)
