= Tylene Buck =

American professional wrestler, valet and pornographic actress (born 1972)

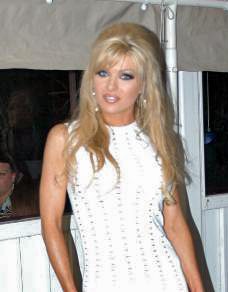
- Buck in 2006
- Born: Tylene Dawn Buck; March 7, 1972 (age 54); Sacramento, California, U.S.
- Occupations: Bikini Modeling; fitness modeling; pornography; camgirl; tradeshow spokesmodel; pro wrestler; promotional model
- Years active: 1999–2001
- Professional wrestling career
- Ring name(s): Major Gunns
- Billed height: 5 ft 6 in (168 cm)
- Billed weight: 135 lb (61 kg)

Tylene Dawn Buck (born March 7, 1972) is an American pornographic actress, model, camgirl, former professional wrestler and valet. She is perhaps best known for her stint in World Championship Wrestling under the ring name Major Gunns.

== Professional wrestling career ==
=== World Championship Wrestling (1999-2001) ===
She had a brief wrestling career that started in late-1999 in World Championship Wrestling as one of the nWo Girls. She was among several other fitness models who came to ringside with the nWo. She soon left the nWo to become a backstage interviewer, but that was also short lived. She then became "Major Gunns" and joined the Misfits In Action stable led by General Rection. Her most notable feuds were with The Filthy Animals' manager Tygress and Miss Hancock. Gunns defeated Hancock at New Blood Rising in a R.O.T.C. or Rip Off The Camo mud match.

On the November 13, 2000 edition of WCW Monday Nitro, Major Gunns turned heel and betrayed the Misfits by throwing a towel in on behalf of Rection, costing him the WCW United States Championship against Team Canada leader Lance Storm. She spent some time in Lance Storm's Team Canada, where Storm would not allow her to show off her body like the Misfits did. Eventually, the evil Major Gunns remained with Team Canada instead of returning to The Misfits. Storm and Gunns went on to feud with Ernest "The Cat" Miller and his valet Miss Jones.

She was released by WCW in February 2001 before it was sold to the World Wrestling Federation.

=== Xtreme Pro Wrestling (2001) ===
She subsequently joined Xtreme Pro Wrestling in California soon thereafter. While in XPW, she became the valet for Sandman and feuded heavily with Lizzy Borden.

=== Double Trouble Wrestling ===
She currently wrestles for the erotic wrestling promotion Double Trouble Wrestling in California. Fans can act as a wrestling booker and order custom matches to have her wrestle in a bikini, topless, nude, etc., against a chosen opponent under various stipulations.

== Other media ==
In 2004, Buck was featured in the controversial wrestling documentary 101 Reasons Not To Be A Pro-Wrestler. As of December 2005 she has left professional wrestling and is now performing in adult films for Seymore Butts' Lighthouse Talent Agency under the name Brandi Wylde. Buck is also a cam girl on the site MyFreeCams.com.

Buck has appeared as a playable character in the video games WCW Backstage Assault, Backyard Wrestling: Don't Try This at Home and Backyard Wrestling 2: There Goes the Neighborhood.
