= List of Lucha Libre USA events =

This is a list of Lucha Libre USA events, detailing all professional wrestling cards promoted, co-promoted by Lucha Libre USA.

== Live events ==
=== 2010 ===
Date	Event	Venue	Location	Main event
August 28	Lucha Libre USA Live!	Bojangles Coliseum	Charlotte, North Carolina	Marco Corleone vs. RJ Brewer
September 9	Lucha Libre USA Live!	Whataburger Field	Corpus Christi, Texas	Blue Demon Jr. vs. RJ Brewer
October 24	Lucha Libre USA Live!	Amarillo Civic Center	Amarillo, Texas	Marco Corleone vs. RJ Brewer vs. Rocky Romero
(c) – refers to the champion(s) heading into the match

=== 2012 ===
Date	Event	Venue	Location	Main event
March 23	Masked Warriors Live!	Reno Events Center	Reno, Nevada	Lizmark Jr. (c) vs. LA Park vs. Chavo Guerrero Jr. for the Lucha Libre USA Heavyweight Championship
March 25	Masked Warriors Live!	Stockton Arena	Stockton, California	Lizmark Jr. (c) vs. Marco Corleone for the Lucha Libre USA Heavyweight Championship
March 30	Masked Warriors Live!	HP Pavilion	San Jose, California	Blue Demon Jr. vs. RJ Brewer
April 13	Masked Warriors Live!	Pico Rivera Sports Arena	Pico Rivera, California	Blue Demon Jr. vs. RJ Brewer
April 14	Masked Warriors Live!	Selland Arena	Fresno, California	Lizmark Jr. (c) vs. Super Nova for the Lucha Libre USA Heavyweight Championship
April 20	Masked Warriors Live!	Bayou Music Center	Houston, Texas	Lizmark Jr. (c) vs. El Nuevo Macho vs. Chavo Guerrero Jr. vs. Marco Corleone for the Lucha Libre USA Heavyweight Championship
April 29	Masked Warriors Live!	Celebrity Theater	Phoenix, Arizona	Lizmark Jr. (c) vs. El Nuevo Macho for the Lucha Libre USA Heavyweight Championship
May 11	Masked Warriors Live!	Illusions Theater	San Antonio, Texas	Blue Demon Jr. vs. RJ Brewer - Career vs. Mask Match (If RJ Brewer Lost he would be forced to wear a luchador mask)
May 12	Masked Warriors Live!	Dell Diamond	Round Rock, Texas	RJ Brewer vs. Magno
(c) – refers to the champion(s) heading into the match

=== 2013 ===
Date	Event	Venue	Location	Main event
April 14	United We Stand Tour	Citizens Business Bank Arena	Ontario, California	Blue Demon Jr. and Solar vs. RJ Brewer and Jon Rekon
April 19	United We Stand Tour	Funplex Entertainment Center	Houston, Texas	Blue Demon Jr. and Solar vs. RJ Brewer and Robbie Gilmore
April 21	United We Stand Tour	GCU Arena	Phoenix, Arizona	Marco Corleone vs. Hawaiian Lion
October 20	Great American Nightmare	Fairplex	Pomona, California	RJ Brewer (c) vs. Solar for the Lucha Libre USA Heavyweight Championship
(c) – refers to the champion(s) heading into the match

== Results ==
=== Lucha Libre USA Live! (2010) ===
==== Charlotte ====
Lucha Libre USA Live!
- Promotion: Lucha Libre USA
- Date: August 28, 2010
- City: Charlotte, North Carolina
- Venue: Bojangles Coliseum
- Attendance: 1,000

This event was produced by Lucha Libre USA held on August 28, 2010, in Charlotte, North Carolina at the Bojangles Coliseum.

No.	Results	Stipulations
1	Chi Chi and Tigresa Caliente defeated Azteko and Mini Park	Tag team match
2	Medianoche, Novillerito and Pequeño Halloween defeated Mascarita Dorada, Octagoncito and Petey Williams	six-man tag team match
3	Súper Nova defeated Rellik	Singles match
4	Lizmark Jr. defeated Charly Malice	Singles match
5	Reid Flair and The Puerto Rican Powers (PR Flyer and San Juan Kid) defeated Rudisimo (El Oriental and Tinieblas Jr.) and Neutronic	six-man tag team match
6	Marco Corleone defeated RJ Brewer	Singles match

==== Corpus Christi ====
Lucha Libre USA Live!
- Promotion: Lucha Libre USA
- Date: September 9, 2010
- City: Corpus Christi, Texas
- Venue: Whataburger Field

This event was produced by Lucha Libre USA held on September 9, 2010, in Corpus Christi, Texas at the Whataburger Field.

No.	Results	Stipulations
1	Chi Chi and Tigresa Caliente defeated Azteko and Mini Park	Tag team match
2	Súper Nova defeated Magno	Singles match
3	Charly Malice defeated El Oriental	Singles match
4	Pequeño Halloween and Torerito defeated Mascarita Dorada and Octagoncito	Tag Team match
5	Marco Corleone (with Súper Nova) defeated Lizmark Jr. (with Sydistiko)	Two out of Three Falls match
6	Blue Demon Jr. defeated RJ Brewer	Singles match

==== Amarillo ====
Lucha Libre USA Live!
- Promotion: Lucha Libre USA
- Date: October 24, 2010
- City: Amarillo, Texas
- Venue: Amarillo Civic Center

This event was produced by Lucha Libre USA held on October 24, 2010, in Amarillo, Texas at the Amarillo Civic Center.

No.	Results	Stipulations
1	Charly Malice and Octagoncito defeated Pequeño Halloween and Torerito	Tag team match
2	Magno defeated Mascarita Dorada	Singles match
3	El Oriental defeated Súper Nova	Singles match
4	Cassandro and Mini Park defeated Chi Chi and Tigresa Caliente	Tag Team match
5	Lizmark Jr. defeated Tinieblas Jr.	Singles match
6	RJ Brewer defeated Marco Corleone and Rocky Romero	Three Way match

=== Masked Warriors Live! (2012) ===
==== Reno ====
Masked Warriors Live!
- Promotion: Lucha Libre USA
- Date: March 23, 2012
- City: Reno, Nevada
- Venue: Reno Events Center

This event was produced by Lucha Libre USA held on March 23, 2012, in Reno, Nevada at the Reno Events Center.

No.	Results	Stipulations
1	Shane Helms and Melina defeated Jillian Hall and Rocky Romero	Mixed tag team match
2	Tinieblas Jr. defeated Súper Nova	Singles match
3	Pequeño Halloween and Vladimiro defeated Octagoncito and Mini Park	Tag Team match
4	Blue Demon Jr. defeated RJ Brewer	Singles match if Blue Demon Jr. loses he must retire
5	Lizmark Jr. (c) defeated LA Park and Chavo Guerrero Jr.	Three Way Match for the Lucha Libre USA Heavyweight Championship
(c) / – the champion(s) heading into the match

==== Stockton ====
Masked Warriors Live!
- Promotion: Lucha Libre USA
- Date: March 25, 2012
- City: Stockton, California
- Venue: Stockton Arena

This event was produced by Lucha Libre USA held on March 25, 2012, in Stockton, California at the Stockton Arena.

No.	Results	Stipulations
1	Shane Helms and Alissa Flash defeated Chavo Guerrero Jr. and Jillian Hall	Mixed tag team match
2	Marco Corleone won	Battle Royal for a shot at the Lucha Libre USA Heavyweight Championship
3	Tinieblas Jr. defeated Súper Nova	Singles match
4	Pequeño Halloween and Vladimiro defeated Octagoncito and Mini Park	Tag Team match
5	Blue Demon Jr. defeated RJ Brewer	No disqualification match
6	Latin Lover defeated Rocky Romero	Singles match
7	Lizmark Jr. (c) defeated Marco Corleone	Singles match for the Lucha Libre USA Heavyweight Championship
(c) / – the champion(s) heading into the match

==== San Jose ====
Masked Warriors Live!
- Promotion: Lucha Libre USA
- Date: March 30, 2012
- City: San Jose, California
- Venue: HP Pavilion
- Attendance: 1,200

This event was produced by Lucha Libre USA held on March 30, 2012, in San Jose, California at the HP Pavilion.

No.	Results	Stipulations
1	Hurricane Helms and Melina defeated Jillian Hall and Rocky Romero	Mixed tag team match
2	Jon Rekon defeated El Oriental	Singles match
3	Latin Lover defeated Marco Corleone	Singles match
4	Magno won	Battle Royal for a shot at the Lucha Libre USA Heavyweight Championship
5	Octagoncito and Mini Park defeated Pequeño Halloween and Vladimiro	Tag Team match
6	Lizmark Jr. (c) defeated Magno	Singles match for the Lucha Libre USA Heavyweight Championship
7	Blue Demon Jr. defeated RJ Brewer	Singles match
(c) / – the champion(s) heading into the match

==== Pico Rivera ====
Masked Warriors Live!
- Promotion: Lucha Libre USA
- Date: April 13, 2012
- City: Pico Rivera, California
- Venue: Pico Rivera Sports Arena

This event was produced by Lucha Libre USA held on April 13, 2012, in Pico Rivera, California at the Pico Rivera Sports Arena.

No.	Results	Stipulations
1	Mini Park defeated Octagoncito and Pequeño Halloween	Three Way match
2	El Nuevo Macho defeated El Boriqua	Singles match
3	Jon Rekon defeated Lizmark Jr. by Count Out	Singles match
4	Rocky Romero won	Battle Royal
5	Melina and Shane Helms defeated Alex Koslov and Rebecca Reyes	Mixed tag team match
6	Latin Lover defeated Marco Corleone	Singles match
7	Blue Demon Jr. defeated RJ Brewer	Anything Goes Match

==== Fresno ====
Masked Warriors Live!
- Promotion: Lucha Libre USA
- Date: April 14, 2012
- City: Fresno, California
- Venue: Selland Arena

This event was produced by Lucha Libre USA held on April 14, 2012, in Fresno, California at the Selland Arena.

No.	Results	Stipulations
1	Shane Helms and Rebecca Reyes defeated Chavo Guerrero Jr. and Melina	Tag Team match
2	El Oriental defeated El Nuevo Macho	Singles match
3	Octagoncito and Mini Park defeated Pequeño Halloween and Vladimiro	Tag Team match
4	Blue Demon Jr. defeated RJ Brewer	Grudge match
5	Marco Corleone defeated Latin Lover	Singles match
6	Lizmark Jr. (c) defeated Súper Nova	Singles match for the Lucha Libre USA Heavyweight Championship
(c) / – the champion(s) heading into the match

==== Houston ====
Masked Warriors Live!
- Promotion: Lucha Libre USA
- Date: April 20, 2012
- City: Houston, Texas
- Venue: Bayou Music Center

This event was produced by Lucha Libre USA held on April 20, 2012, in Houston, Texas at the Bayou Music Center.

No.	Results	Stipulations
1	Marco Corleone defeated Chaz Taylor and Hambone and Jack Jameson and Nemesis and Octagoncito and Pequeño Halloween and Wallace Gordon	Battle Royal for a shot at the Lucha Libre USA Heavyweight Championship
2	Melina and Shane Helms defeated Chavo Guerrero Jr. and Jillian Hall	Mixed tag team match
3	El Nuevo Macho defeated Magno	Singles match
4	Octagoncito defeated Mini Park and Pequeño Halloween	Three Way match
5	Lizmark Jr. (c) defeated Marco Corleone	Singles match for the Lucha Libre USA Heavyweight Championship
6	Blue Demon Jr. defeated RJ Brewer	Singles match
(c) / – the champion(s) heading into the match

==== Phoenix ====
Masked Warriors Live!
- Promotion: Lucha Libre USA
- Date: April 29, 2012
- City: Phoenix, Arizona
- Venue: Celebrity Theater

This event was produced by Lucha Libre USA held on April 29, 2012, in Phoenix, Arizona at the Celebrity Theater.

No.	Results	Stipulations
1	Octagoncito defeated Mini Park and Pequeño Halloween	Three Way match
2	El Oriental defeated El Mariachi	Singles match
3	El Nuevo Macho defeated Magno	Singles match
4	Rebecca Reyes and Shane Helms defeated Hawaiian Lion and Jillian Hall	Mixed tag team match
5	Lizmark Jr. defeated Chavo Guerrero Jr.	Singles match
6	Blue Demon Jr. defeated RJ Brewer	Singles match

==== San Antonio ====
Masked Warriors Live!
- Promotion: Lucha Libre USA
- Date: May 11, 2012
- City: San Antonio, Texas
- Venue: Illusions Theater

This event was produced by Lucha Libre USA held on May 11, 2012, in San Antonio, Texas at the Illusions Theater.

No.	Results	Stipulations
1	Jon Rekon defeated AJ Summers, Big Dogg, Galvan, Honkey Kong and Joey Spector	Battle Royal
2	Octagoncito defeated Mini Park	Singles match
3	Chavo Guerrero Jr. defeated El Oriental	Singles match
4	Magno defeated El Nuevo Macho	Singles match
5	Latin Lover defeated Lizmark Jr. (c) by DQ	Singles match for the Lucha Libre USA Heavyweight Championship
6	Blue Demon Jr. defeated RJ Brewer	Singles match
(c) / – the champion(s) heading into the match

==== Round Rock ====
Masked Warriors Live!
- Promotion: Lucha Libre USA
- Date: May 12, 2012
- City: Round Rock, Texas
- Venue: Dell Diamond

This event was produced by Lucha Libre USA held on May 12, 2012, in Round Rock, Texas at the Dell Diamond.

No.	Results	Stipulations
1	Jon Rekon won	Battle Royal
2	Octagoncito defeated Mini Park and Pequeño Halloween	Three Way match
3	Chavo Guerrero Jr. defeated Jon Rekon by DQ	Singles match
4	Mascarita Dorada defeated Sydistiko	Singles match
5	Rebecca Reyes and Shane Helms defeated Jillian Hall and Rocky Romero	Mixed tag team match
6	Lizmark Jr. (c) defeated Latin Lover	Singles match for the Lucha Libre USA Heavyweight Championship
7	Magno defeated RJ Brewer	Singles match
(c) / – the champion(s) heading into the match

=== United We Stand Tour (2013) ===
==== Ontario ====
United We Stand Tour
- Promotion: Lucha Libre USA
- Date: April 13, 2013
- City: Ontario, California
- Venue: Citizens Business Bank Arena

This event was produced by Lucha Libre USA held on April 13, 2013, in Ontario, California at the Citizens Business Bank Arena.

No.	Results	Stipulations
1	Mini Park and Vladimiro defeated Celestial and Pequeño Halloween	Tag Team match
2	El Nuevo Macho defeated Psicosis II	Singles match
3	Súper Nova defeated Super Crazy	Singles match
4	La Mascara defeated Mr. Aguila	Singles match
5	Hurricane Helms defeated Lizmark Jr. by DQ	Singles match
6	Blue Demon Jr. and Solar defeated Jon Rekon and RJ Brewer	Tag Team match

==== Houston II ====
United We Stand Tour
- Promotion: Lucha Libre USA
- Date: April 19, 2013
- City: Houston, Texas
- Venue: Funplex Entertainment Center

This event was produced by Lucha Libre USA held on April 19, 2013, in Houston, Texas at the Funplex Entertainment Center.

No.	Results	Stipulations
1	Mitch Baxter defeated Erik Lockhart	Singles match
2	El Nuevo Macho defeated Abel Andrew Jackson	Singles match
3	Andrew Lockhart defeated Cedric Pain	Singles match
4	Lizmark Jr. defeated Mini Park	Singles match
5	Psicosis II defeated Súper Nova	Singles match
6	Blue Demon Jr. and Solar defeated RJ Brewer and Robbie Gilmore	Tag Team match

==== Phoenix II ====
United We Stand Tour
- Promotion: Lucha Libre USA
- Date: April 21, 2013
- City: Phoenix, Arizona
- Venue: GCU Arena

This event was produced by Lucha Libre USA held on April 21, 2013, in Phoenix, Arizona at the GCU Arena.

No.	Results	Stipulations
1	Pequeño Halloween defeated Blue Demoncito Jr. and Mini Park	Three Way match
2	Hurricane Helms defeated Mr. Águila	Singles match
3	Súper Nova defeated Jon Rekon	Singles match
4	Super Crazy defeated Psicosis	Singles match
5	Marco Corleone defeated Hawaiian Lion	Singles match
6	RJ Brewer (c) defeated Solar and La Mascara	Three Way match for the Lucha Libre USA Heavyweight Championship
(c) / – the champion(s) heading into the match

=== Great American Nightmare (2013) ===
==== Pomona ====
Great American Nightmare
- Promotion: Lucha Libre USA
- Date: October 20, 2013
- City: Pomona, California
- Venue: Fairplex

This event was produced by Lucha Libre USA held on October 20, 2013, in Pomona, California at the Fairplex. This event was an attraction as part of Rob Zombie's Great American Nightmare Festival.

No.	Results	Stipulations
1	Solar defeated RJ Brewer (c)	Singles match for the Lucha Libre USA Heavyweight Championship
2	RJ Brewer defeated Solar (c)	Singles match for the Lucha Libre USA Heavyweight Championship
(c) / – the champion(s) heading into the match

== See also ==
- List of Lucha Libre USA: Masked Warriors episodes
