= List of Lucha Libre USA: Masked Warriors episodes =

Lucha Libre USA: Masked Warriors premiered on MTV2 on July 16, 2010. It focused on professional wrestling matches, with commentary from multiple commentators including Todd Romero, Kevin Kelly and Stevie Richards. Video packages highlighting wrestlers or storylines, air throughout each broadcast as well as several interactions between either the wrestlers themselves or with storyline involved characters. In 2012 the series was aired on the streaming service Hulu.

As of 2012, 20 episodes of Lucha Libre USA: Masked Warriors have aired as well as one special episode.

== Series overview ==
Season	Episodes	Originally released		
Season	Episodes	First released	Last released	Network
Special		July 6, 2010		MTV2
1	7	July 16, 2010	August 27, 2010	MTV2
2	13	October 1, 2011	October 3, 2012	MTV2 / Hulu

=== Special ===
No.	Title	Location	Original release date	U.S. viewers (million)
1	"Behind The Mask"	Mexico / United States	July 6, 2010	N/A
Get a behind the scenes look at the Mexican wrestling phenomenon Lucha Libre as it gets ready to invade the US for the first time in English.

=== Season 1 (2010) ===
No.	Title	Location	Venue	Original release date	U.S. viewers (million)
1.1	"Lucha Libre USA: Masked Warriors Premieres"	Palm Springs, California	Agua Caliente Casino	July 16, 2010	0.16
El Limon, El Oriental and Neutronic defeated Mascara Púrpura and The Puerto Rican Powers (PR Flyer & San Juan Kid); Chi Chi and Pequeño Halloween (w/ Tigresa Caliente) defeated Mascarita Dorada & Mini Park; Marco Corleone (w/ Solid) defeated Tinieblas Jr. (w/ Neutronic) – LLUSA Heavyweight Championship Tournament First Round Match
1.2	"Arizona's Favorite Son"	Palm Springs, California	Agua Caliente Casino	July 23, 2010	0.09
Lujo Esquire and Octagoncito defeated Misteriosito and Rellik; Lizmark Jr. and Sydistiko defeated Charly Malice and Super Nova – LLUSA Tag Team Championship Tournament First Round Match; Magno defeated R. J. Brewer via DQ
1.3	"The Awesome Surprise"	Springfield, Massachusetts	The Hippodrome	July 30, 2010	0.10
Lizmark Jr., Pequeño Halloween and Sydistiko defeated Mascara Purpura, Octagoncito and Super Nova; Charly Malice defeated Rellik; Amazing Kong and Mini Park defeated Chi Chi and Tigresa Caliente
1.4	"Bad Blood Brewing"	Springfield, Massachusetts	The Hippodrome	August 6, 2010	0.12
Magno defeated R. J. Brewer; Mascarita Dorada and The Puerto Rican Powers (PR Flyer and San Juan Kid) defeated Neutronic, Pequeño Halloween and Saber Claw; Rudisimo (El Oriental and Tinieblas Jr.) defeated Lujo Esquire and Marco Corleone (w/ Solid) – LLUSA Tag Team Championship Tournament First Round Match
1.5	"Cat and Mouse Games"	Las Vegas, Nevada	Thomas & Mack Center	August 13, 2010	0.06
Marco Corleone, Octagoncito and Super Nova defeated Medianoche, Neutronic and Pequeño Halloween; Lizmark Jr. defeated Solid – LLUSA Heavyweight Championship Tournament First Round Match; Amazing Kong and Mini Park defeated Chi Chi and Tigresa Caliente
1.6	"Here Comes the Bride"	Las Vegas, Nevada	Thomas & Mack Center	August 20, 2010	0.09
R. J. Brewer defeated Mascarita Dorada; The Puerto Rican Powers (PR Flyer and San Juan Kid) defeated Magno and Mascara Purpura; Charly Malice defeated Rellik – Hardcore Match
1.7	"Now That's Cool"	Las Vegas, Nevada	Thomas & Mack Center	August 27, 2010	0.05
Mentallo defeated Azteko; R. J. Brewer (w/ Brooke Carter) defeated Mascara Purpura – LLUSA Heavyweight Championship Tournament First Round Match; Carlitos and The Puerto Rican Powers (PR Flyer and San Juan Kid) defeated Rudisimo (El Oriental and Tinieblas Jr.) and Neutronic

=== Season 2 (2011–12) ===
No.	Title	Location	Venue	Original release date	U.S. viewers (million)
2.1	"Crowning The Champion"	Albuquerque, New Mexico	Hard Rock Hotel & Casino Albuquerque	October 1, 2011	0.08
Treachery (Rellik and Sydistiko) defeated Rudisimo (El Oriental and Tinieblas Jr.); Mini Park defeats Rosetta Park – Lumberjack Match; Lizmark Jr. (w/ Rellik and Sydistiko) defeated Charly Malice, Marco Corleone and R. J. Brewer – Tournament Final Four Way Elimination Match for the inaugural LLUSA Heavyweight Championship
2.2	"The Emperor"	Albuquerque, New Mexico	Hard Rock Hotel & Casino Albuquerque	October 8, 2011	0.10
Magno and Rocky Romero defeated Treachery (Rellik and Sydistiko); Mascarita Dorada and Octagoncito defeated Pequeño Halloween and Tigresa Caliente; Petey Williams (w/ R. J. Brewer) defeated Super Nova
2.3	"The Wager Match"	Albuquerque, New Mexico	Hard Rock Hotel & Casino Albuquerque	October 15, 2011	N/A
Rudisimo (El Oriental and Tinieblas Jr.) defeated The Puerto Rican Powers (PR Flyer and San Juan Kid); Marco Corleone defeated Sydistiko via DQ; Magno defeated R. J. Brewer (w/ Lizzy Valentine Carter) – Mask vs. Hair Match
2.4	"Tag Team Champions Are Crowned"	Albuquerque, New Mexico	Hard Rock Hotel & Casino Albuquerque	October 22, 2011	N/A
Petey Williams defeated Charly Malice; Jon Rekon defeated Magno; Rudisimo (El Oriental and Tinieblas Jr.) defeated Treachery (Rellik and Sydistiko) and The Puerto Rican Powers (PR Flyer and San Juan Kid) – Tournament Final Three Way Tag Team Match for the inaugural LLUSA Tag Team Championship
2.5	"Pure Choas"	Albuquerque, New Mexico	Hard Rock Hotel & Casino Albuquerque	October 29, 2011	N/A
Rudisimo (El Oriental and Tinieblas Jr.) (c) defeated Charly Malice and Rocky Romero via DQ – LLUSA Tag Team Championship; Marco Corleone and Shane Helms defeated Treachery (Lizmark Jr. and Sydistiko); Magno and Super Nova defeated The Right (Petey Williams and R. J. Brewer) (w/ Lizzy Valentine Carter) – Tag Team Ladder Match
2.6	"Treachery Gets Treacherous"	Albuquerque, New Mexico	Hard Rock Hotel & Casino Albuquerque	November 5, 2011	N/A
LA Park defeated Chi Chi, Mascarita Dorada, Mini Park, Mini Super Raton, Octagoncito, ODB, Pequeno Halloween, Tigresa Caliente and Dragoncito – Mystery Mini Rumble; Shane Helms defeated Sydistiko via DQ
2.7	"Lucha Roulette"	Albuquerque, New Mexico	Hard Rock Hotel & Casino Albuquerque	November 12, 2011	N/A
The Latin Liberators (Magno and Super Nova) defeated Rudisimo (El Oriental and Tinieblas Jr.); Nurse Krissy Sealice and Valdimiro defeated ODB and Mini Park; Lucha Roulette Match –; 1. Rellik - Eliminated (1) by Marco Corleone; 2. Sydistiko - Eliminated (6) by R. J. Brewer; 3. Rocky Romero - Eliminated (2) by Petey Williams; 4. Charly Malice - Winner; 5. R. J. Brewer - Eliminated (7) by Charly Malice; 6. Petey Williams - Eliminated (4) by Charly Malice; 7. Marco Corleone - Eliminated (5) by Sydistiko; 8. Shane Helms - Eliminated (3) by Sydistiko
2.8	"Treachery and Malice"	Albuquerque, New Mexico	Hard Rock Hotel & Casino Albuquerque	November 19, 2011	N/A
Marco Corleone and Shane Helms defeated Treachery (Rellik and Sydistiko); The Right (R. J. Brewer, Petey Williams and Jon Rekon) defeated The Latin Liberators (Magno, Rocky Romero and Super Nova); Lizmark Jr. (c) defeated Charly Malice – Singles Match for the LLUSA Heavyweight Championship
2.9	"Sol Arises"	Albuquerque, New Mexico	Hard Rock Hotel & Casino Albuquerque	September 5, 2012	N/A
Marco Corleone vs. Sydistiko - Double Count Out; Vladimiro defeated Mascarita Dorada; Sol I (Tinieblas Jr.) and Sol II defeated El Oriental (c) – Two on One Handicap Match for the LLUSA Tag Team Championship
2.10	"Ooh Yeah!"	Albuquerque, New Mexico	Hard Rock Hotel & Casino Albuquerque	September 12, 2012	N/A
The Latin Liberators (Rocky Romero and Super Nova) defeated The Puerto Rican Powers (PR Flyer and San Juan Kid); The Right (Jon Rekon and Petey Williams) defeated Jay Lethal and Magno; R. J. Brewer defeated Psicosis – #1 Contenders Match for the LLUSA Heavyweight Championship
2.11	"Marco and the Odds"	Albuquerque, New Mexico	Hard Rock Hotel & Casino Albuquerque	September 19, 2012	N/A
Rocky Romero defeated Petey Williams; El Oriental defeated Tinieblas Jr.; Marco Corleone defeated The Headhunters (Headhunter A and Headhunter B) – #1 Contenders Two on One Handicap Match for the LLUSA Heavyweight Championship
2.12	"Just When You Think You Have The Answer..."	Albuquerque, New Mexico	Hard Rock Hotel & Casino Albuquerque	September 26, 2012	N/A
Super Nova defeated Jon Rekon via Count Out; Agulia defeated El Oriental; Jay Lethal (w/ Pequeño Halloween) defeated Medianoche (w/ Mini Park)
2.13	"Masked Warfare"	Albuquerque, New Mexico	Hard Rock Hotel & Casino Albuquerque	October 3, 2012	N/A
The Right (Petey Williams and Jon Rekon) defeated The Latin Liberators (Rocky Romero and Super Nova) – Tag Team Match for the Vacant LLUSA Tag Team Championship; Mini Park, Octagoncito and Pequeño Halloween defeated Nurse Krissy Sealice, Rebecca Reyes and Valdimiro; R. J. Brewer defeated Lizmark Jr. (c) and Marco Corleone – Three Way Match for the LLUSA Heavyweight Championship

== See also ==
- List of Lucha Libre USA events
