= Patrocinio =

Patrocinio may refer to:

== In people ==
=== Given name ===
- José Patrocinio Jiménez (born 1953), Colombian former professional racing cyclist
- Laerte Patrocínio Orpinelli (1952-2013), Brazilian serial killer
- Patrocinio de Biedma (1858-1927), Spanish writer
- Patrocinio Díaz (1905-1969), Argentine singer
- Patrocinio Gamboa (1865-1953), Filipino revolutionary
- Patrocinio González Garrido (1934-2021), Mexican politician
- Patrocinio Samudio (1975-2017), Paraguayan professional footballer
- Sor Patrocinio (1811-1891), Spanish nun
- Don Patrocinio (1940-2021), Mexican former equestrian athlete

=== Surname ===
- Adriano Meireles Patrocínio, Angolan politician
- André Patrocínio (born 1990), Brazilian field hockey player
- José do Patrocínio (1854-1905), Brazilian writer, journalist, activist, orator and pharmacist
- José do Patrocínio Oliveira (1904-1987), Brazilian musician and voice actor

== In places ==
- Patrocínio, municipality in the state of Minas Gerais in Brazil
- Patrocínio do Muriaé, municipality located in the state of Minas Gerais, Brazil
- Patrocínio Paulista, municipality in the state of São Paulo in Brazil
