= Temastián =

Locality in Totatiche, Jalisco, Mexico

- Locality
- Temastián de Julián Hernández
- Interactive map of Temastián
- Coordinates: 21°58′38″N 103°31′35″W
- Country: Mexico
- State: Jalisco
- Municipality: Totatiche
- Elevation: 1,751 m (5,745 ft)

Population (2020)
  - Total: 1,005
- Time zone: UTC−6 (CST)
  - Summer (DST): UTC−5 (CDT)
- Postal code: 46180

Temastián (officially known as Temastián de Julián Hernández) is a historic locality situated within the municipality of Totatiche, located in the northern region of the Mexican state of Jalisco.

The name Temastián originates from the Nahuatl word temachtiani, which translates directly to "educator" or "teacher." The town is regionally famous for its distinctive architecture made from pink cantera stone and its prominent status as a major center for religious tourism and equestrian tradition.

== Culture and Religious Pilgrimage ==
Temastián is recognized as one of the most important centers for religious pilgrimage in western Mexico, drawing tens of thousands of visitors annually. The culture of the town centers around the Santuario del Señor de los Rayos (Sanctuary of the Lord of the Lightning), which houses a highly revered 16th-century crucifix originally brought to the region by Franciscan missionaries.

Local historical chronicles detail that during an intense storm in the colonial era, a lightning bolt struck the crucifix assembly but left the central image completely unharmed, giving the icon its distinct name. The town's major religious and cultural festivities take place annually from January 3 to January 12, as well as during the Feast of the Ascension, culminating in traditional indigenous dances, regional music, and massive foot pilgrimages arriving from Zacatecas and Aguascalientes.

== Architecture ==
The locality is known for its traditional architectural profile, which relies heavily on locally quarried pink cantera stone (cantera rosa). The Sanctuary itself features detailed filigree carvings in stone, a sprawling open-air stone atrium designed to hold overflow crowds during festivals, and prominent twin baroque-style spires flanking a central dome arranged in a Latin Cross layout.

== Notable people ==
- Father Juan Navarro: Prominent local clergyman who directed the monumental construction phase of the modern sanctuary complex and expanded the regional pilgrimage infrastructure.
- Mauro Castañeda C.: Master stonemason whose intricate work with local pink cantera stone defined the physical facade and internal carvings of the historic sanctuary temple.
- Don Patrocinio: Equestrian athlete and historical figure from the region. Despite having no legs, he achieved status within the traditional Mexican riding community of horse riding and equestrian sports in Jalisco.
