= Patrocinio Loera Loera =

Mexican charro performer and public figure

- Born: November 16, 1940; Temastián, Jalisco
- Died: January 11, 2021 (aged 80)
- Occupation: Former equestrian

Patrocinio Loera Loera (November 16, 1940 – January 11, 2021), widely known as Don Patrocinio, was a Mexican charro performer and public figure from Temastián, Jalisco. Born without lower limbs, Loera achieved recognition for his mobility, equestrian skills, and public performances in both Mexico and the United States.

In 2017, he was officially recognized by the State Government of Jalisco as an exemplary citizen.

== Biography ==
Loera was born on November 16, 1940, and raised in Temastián, a community in the municipality of Totatiche, located in the northern region of the Mexican state of Jalisco. Born without both legs, he developed high physical agility from childhood, participating alongside his peers at the local school.

He later pursued equestrian activities and became a public figure, known for his ability to ride horses despite his physical disability. He was married to Luz Morales, with whom he had a son named Pablo.

== Performances ==
Loera performed as a charro figure in various arenas and massive event venues across Mexico and the United States. In the United States, his tours primarily focused on Mexican-American cultural and equestrian centers in California. Notable venues where he performed included the Pico Rivera Sports Arena in Pico Rivera and Los Alazanes in El Monte.

== Awards and honors ==
In August 2017, the State Government of Jalisco, through the Sistema para el Desarrollo Integral de la Familia (DIF), honored Loera during the annual Adulto Mayor Distinguido (Distinguished Senior Citizen) awards. Representing the Region 1 Norte (Northern Zone) of Jalisco, Loera was awarded first place for his trajectory of overcoming adversity and community inspiration. The honorary award, which included a recognition bonus of $20,000 MXN, was presented to him on August 22, 2017, by the Governor of Jalisco, Jorge Aristóteles Sandoval, and the president of DIF Jalisco, Lorena Jassibe Sandoval, during a formal ceremony in the state capital of Guadalajara.

== Death ==
Loera died on January 11, 2021, at the age of 80.
