= Adriano Meireles Patrocínio =

Angolan politician

Adriano Meireles Patrocínio is an Angolan politician for the MPLA and a member of the National Assembly of Angola.
