= Johnny Stamboli =

American professional wrestler

Personal information
- Born: Jonathan Hugger; April 20, 1977 (age 49) Atlanta, Georgia, U.S.

Professional wrestling career
- Ring name(s): Jon Hugger; Johnny Hugger; Johnny the Bull; Johnny Stamboli; Redrum; Rellik; The Great Muta; The Unknown Wrestler
- Billed height: 6 ft 2 in (188 cm)
- Billed weight: 240 lb (109 kg)
- Billed from: Little Italy, Manhattan "The Depths of Hell"
- Trained by: Paul Orndorff; WCW Power Plant
- Debut: 1999

Jonathan Hugger (born April 20, 1977) is an American professional wrestler. He is best known for his appearances with World Championship Wrestling under the ring name Johnny the Bull, for World Wrestling Entertainment under the ring name Johnny Stamboli, and for Total Nonstop Action Wrestling, Lucha Libre AAA World Wide and Lucha Libre USA under the ring name Rellik.

== Professional wrestling career ==
=== World Championship Wrestling (1999–2001) ===
While attending college in Atlanta, Georgia, and working as a doorman at the Club Oxygen nightclub, Hugger exercised at the Main Event Fitness gym, which was owned by World Championship Wrestling (WCW) employees Lex Luger and Sting. During one of his visits to the gym, WCW employee Diamond Dallas Page met with Hugger and encouraged him to train as a wrestler. Hugger subsequently participated alongside 19 other prospective wrestlers in a $240 tryout at the WCW's Power Plant training center. The tryout featured press ups, sprinting, squats and freestyle wrestling in temperatures of over 100 degrees. Hugger passed the tryout, but did not immediately begin training as a wrestler. Six months later, he was attacked and stabbed six times. Hugger resolved to change his lifestyle, which he believed had resulted in his assault, and enlisted in the Power Plant, where he was finally trained to wrestle in earnest.

After training, Hugger debuted for WCW as "Johnny Hugger" on the September 28, 1999 episode of WCW WorldWide, losing to Chuck Palumbo. Hugger's WCW Pay-Per-View debut came at their December 19, 1999 Starrcade. He adopted the ring name "Johnny the Bull" and formed a Mafia-themed tag team called the Mamalukes with Big Vito, which was managed by Tony Marinara.

On January 18, 2000, in Evansville, Indiana, Hugger and Big Vito defeated Crowbar and David Flair for the WCW World Tag Team Championship. The match was broadcast on the January 19 episode of Thunder. They held the championship until February 12, when they were defeated by Creative Control in Oberhausen during a tour of Germany. The Mamalukes regained the championship on the following day in Leipzig, and held it until March 19, when they lost to Creative Control in a no disqualification match at the pay-per-view Uncensored, which took place in the AmericanAirlines Arena in Miami, Florida.

On June 5, 2000, The Mamalukes attacked Hardcore Champion Terry Funk during a title defense against WCW President Eric Bischoff, enabling Bischoff to defeat Funk. On the June 7 episode of Thunder, Bischoff awarded the Hardcore Championship to The Mamalukes, making them co-champions. On June 19, Big Vito defeated Hugger to become the undisputed Hardcore Champion. On the July 3 episode of Nitro, while wrestling Funk in a hardcore match, Hugger tore his urethra while executing a diving leg drop and was sidelined for two months while recuperating.

On the September 11, 2000 edition of Nitro, Hugger returned to betray Vito and join several other Power Plant graduates in a stable known as the Natural Born Thrillers, a collection of young wrestlers who sought to challenge more established wrestlers. Hugger eventually reconciled with Vito and reformed the Mamalukes, and the two continued teaming until WCW's closure in March 2001. Their final match in WCW was a loss to the team of Lance Storm and Mike Awesome on the March 12 edition of Nitro.

=== World Wrestling Federation / World Wrestling Entertainment (2001–2004) ===
In March 2001, WCW was purchased by its Stamford, Connecticut-based rival, the World Wrestling Federation (WWF). Hugger's contract was bought out by the WWF. Johnny the Bull wrestled one dark match before the July 12, 2001 edition of SmackDown!, losing to Rob Van Dam. Johnny the Bull was introduced to the promotion as a member of The Alliance but after a single appearance on WWF television, Hugger was sent to the Heartland Wrestling Association, an Ohio-based WWF developmental territory, in late July 2001, to further his training. While in the HWA, he won the promotion's Heavyweight Championship on two occasions in 2002.

After the WWF was renamed to World Wrestling Entertainment in May 2002, Hugger returned to WWE television on the June 30, 2002 episode of Sunday Night Heat under the ring name Johnny "The Bull" Stamboli, losing via disqualification to Tommy Dreamer. On the July 15 episode of Raw, Stamboli won the Hardcore Championship, his first title in WWE, from Bradshaw. Bradshaw would, however, regain the title from Hugger later that night. On the July 29 episode of Raw, Stamboli won the Hardcore Championship once again after pinning Jeff Hardy, but lost the title a few seconds later to Tommy Dreamer. Following this, he became a mainstay on Heat and would later turn face due to fan reaction in late September 2002.

On February 13, 2003, Stamboli was moved to the SmackDown! brand and became a heel again when he allied with Nunzio and Chuck Palumbo to attack Rikishi. Together, the trio became the Full Blooded Italians. The FBI would go on to wrestle throughout 2003 and early 2004 before disbanding on March 22, 2004, when Palumbo was moved to the Raw brand. Stamboli and Nunzio continued to team together until he was released from his WWE contract on November 4.

=== All Japan Pro Wrestling (2004–2005) ===
Following his release from WWE, Hugger began wrestling for the Japanese All Japan Pro Wrestling promotion after his friend Troy Endres, who was portraying a fake Great Muta, retired after tearing both of his anterior cruciate ligaments and nominated Hugger as his replacement. Hugger donned a mask and adopted the character of GREAT MUTA, losing to the real Great Muta at The Unchained World on December 5, 2004, in the Ryōgoku Kokugikan in Tokyo.

On January 2, 2005, in the Korakuen Hall in Tokyo, Hugger dropped his Great Muta character and formed a stable with Taru known as the Voodoo Murders. The Voodoo Murders, who declared that they wished to destroy AJPW, eventually expanded to include several other WCW and WWE alumni, including Chuck Palumbo.

=== Independent circuit (2005–2007) ===
In 2005, Hugger and Chuck Palumbo reformed the Full Blooded Italians in the Italy-based Nu-Wrestling Evolution promotion. In 2006, Hugger toured Mexico, teaming with Marco Corleone in the Consejo Mundial de Lucha Libre promotion. In late 2006, Hugger began working for the Arizona-based Impact Zone Wrestling promotion, where he created a character named REDRUM, a reference to the 1980 film The Shining. Hugger based Redrum on the Great Muta character he had portrayed in AJPW.

=== Return to World Wrestling Entertainment (2007) ===
In the summer of 2007, Hugger wrestled two dark matches for World Wrestling Entertainment, using the ring name The Unknown Wrestler defeating Chavo Guerrero Jr.

=== Total Nonstop Action Wrestling (2007–2008) ===
In late 2007, Hugger exhibited his REDRUM character for Jeff Jarrett, Vince Russo and Terry Taylor, members of the creative team of the Orlando, Florida–based Total Nonstop Action Wrestling (TNA) promotion, and was subsequently hired. He debuted in TNA on November 11, 2007 at the pay-per-view Genesis. In his next appearance, his ring name was changed to Rellik (killer spelt backwards). He then aligned himself with Black Reign and James Mitchell, with he and Reign forming a tag team. In their debut match as a team, they lost to Abyss and Raven at Turning Point in a Match of 10,000 Tacks. After losing several matches, the team picked up its first and only victory after defeating The Motor City Machineguns on the March 10, 2008 episode of Impact!. On the April 16 episode of Impact!, Rellik and Black Reign made their final appearance as a team in a losing effort to Team 3D in the first round of the Deuces Wild tournament. After losing three dark matches in mid-May, Hugger left TNA. After TNA, Hugger returned to the independent circuit until the end of the year. For 2009 he was inactive from wrestling.

=== Lucha Libre USA (2010–2011) ===
Hugger returned to wrestling on June 6, 2010 Lucha Libre USA debut match saw him, as Rellik, team with Misteriosito in a losing effort against Lujo Esquire and Octagoncito. Rellik took part in a tournament to crown number one contenders for the LLUSA Heavyweight Championship but was defeated by Charly Malice in the first round of the tournament. Hugger Joined Lizmark, Jr.'s stable Treachery along with Sydistiko. On December 12, 2010, Treachery (Rellik and Sydistiko) defeated Dinastia (El Oriental and Tinieblas, Jr.) in a tag match to advance into the 3-way tag team title match, Rellik helped Lizmark, Jr. to win the LLUSA Heavyweight Championship by blinding Marco Corleone with powder. On January 22, 2011, Rudisimo (El Oriental and Tinieblas, Jr.) defeated Puerto Rican Power (P.R. Flyer and San Juan Kid) and Treachery (Rellik and Sydistiko) in a three-way tag match to become the inaugural Lucha Libre USA Tag Team Champions. On March 19, Marco Corleone and Shane Helms defeated Treachery (Rellik and Sydistiko) in a tag team match, and later on in the main event, Rellik took part in a lucha roulette elimination number one contenders match for the LLUSA Championship, which was won by Charly Malice.

=== Later career (2011–2014) ===
Hugger wrestled as Johnny Stamboli for the Phoenix, Arizona based IWF promotion. He teamed with Tyson Tyler as "G.F.Y.". Hugger also appeared in IWF as "REDRUM", a character similar to Rellik. As REDRUM, Hugger lost via disqualification to The Hurricane on May 15, 2014. This was Hugger's last wrestling match.

== Personal life ==
In July 2016, Hugger was named part of a class action lawsuit filed against WWE which alleged that wrestlers incurred traumatic brain injuries during their tenure and that the company concealed the risks of injury. The suit is litigated by attorney Konstantine Kyros, who has been involved in a number of other lawsuits against WWE. In September 2018, The lawsuit was dismissed by US District Judge Vanessa Lynne Bryant.

== Championships and accomplishments ==
- Heartland Wrestling Association
  - HWA Heavyweight Championship (2 times)
- Impact Zone Wrestling
  - IZW Heavyweight Championship (1 time)
- Toryumon
  - Yamaha Cup (2006) – with Chuck Palumbo
- World Championship Wrestling
  - WCW Hardcore Championship (1 time)^{1}
  - WCW World Tag Team Championship (2 times) – with Big Vito
- World Wrestling Entertainment
  - WWE Hardcore Championship (2 times)

^{1}Johnny the Bull held the title jointly with Big Vito during his reign.
