= Allan Funk =

American professional wrestler

Personal information
- Born: Allan Eric Funk; July 7, 1971 (age 55) Alliance, Ohio, U.S.

Professional wrestling career
- Ring name(s): Alan Funk; Allan Funk; Bruce; Chi Chi; Kwee Wee; Queen Herod; The Funkster; Triple A
- Billed height: 5 ft 10 in (1.78 m)
- Billed weight: 220 lb (100 kg)
- Billed from: Alliance, Ohio
- Trained by: WCW Power Plant
- Debut: 1996
- Retired: 2011

Allan Eric Funk (born July 7, 1971) is a former American professional wrestler who has previously worked in promotions such as World Championship Wrestling and Total Nonstop Action Wrestling, often with comedic personas. He also competed in Lucha Libre USA as Chi Chi.

== Professional wrestling career ==
=== Early career (1996–1998) ===
Funk made his professional wrestling debut in 1996 in independent promotions based in Ohio.

=== World Championship Wrestling (1998–2001) ===
Funk first appeared in World Championship Wrestling (WCW) under his real name, wrestling on Saturday Night and WorldWide against opponents such as Sonny Siaki. Soon after his debut, Funk had a brief feud with Barry Horowitz, he then teamed with "Above Average" Mike Sanders, as the Re-Enforcers. The team dissolved after both men got brought to WCW Monday Nitro.

Upon his graduation from the WCW Power Plant in 1998, Funk was moved up to the main roster and given the gimmick of an eccentric homosexual dressed in pink, and given the ring name Kwee Wee, accompanied by his manager Paisley. Near the end of WCW's existence, Kwee Wee developed an aggressive alter-ego named "Angry Allan", whom Kwee Wee would suddenly "turn into" during a match, a gimmick similar to Dr. Jekyll and Mr. Hyde or The Incredible Hulk. He feuded with Prince Iaukea, Elix Skipper and The Natural Born Thrillers.

Kwee Wee appeared in the final WCW pay-per-view Greed on March 18, 2001, in a losing effort against Jason Jett. After this, WCW was bought by the World Wrestling Federation (WWF) in March 2001.

=== World Wrestling Federation (2001) ===
Kwee Wee was signed by the WWF after the 2001 WCW buyout, but was never featured on WWF television. He worked for their development territory Heartland Wrestling Association in Ohio and was released in December.

=== World Wrestling All-Stars (2002) ===
Funk briefly appeared in World Wrestling All-Stars as Alan Funk, before rebranding as "The Funkster", an impression of "The Hulkster" Hulk Hogan. He wrestled four matches, three of them against Pierre Ouellet, before the promotion folded the following year.

=== Total Nonstop Action Wrestling (2002) ===
Funk joined Total Nonstop Action Wrestling (TNA) on June 19, 2002, as Bruce, once again working a homosexual gimmick and forming a short-lived tag team with Lenny Lane known as The Rainbow Express. The team split on November 20, 2002. Bruce also won the Miss TNA Championship on July 31, 2002.

=== Independent circuit (2002–2005, 2009) ===
On September 27, 2003, at the Baltic Brawl event in Helsinki, Finland, Funk wrestled a tag team match with Mike Sanders against Elix Skipper and Sonny Siaki. During that match, Siaki botched a split-legged moonsault and landed on Funk's face knee-first. Funk was badly injured, breaking his eardrum, nose and jaw, also cracking his orbital bone. He has had four surgeries to repair the damage and is still 100% deaf in his left ear, but made an otherwise full recovery.

In 2005, Funk made an appearance in Vince Russo's Ring of Glory promotion as Queen Herod. At the end of 2005, Funk took a hiatus from wrestling.

In early 2009, Funk returned to wrestling, working four matches in NWA Wildside in Cornelia, Georgia.

=== All Japan Pro Wrestling (2003–2004) ===
Funk made his debut in All Japan Pro Wrestling on August 19, 2003, on Night 1 of the Summer Action Series II tour under the name Funkster, tagging with Kendo Kashin and Misterio Red, defeating the team of Masanobu Fuchi, Hi69 and Taichi Ishikari. He primarily featured in tag matches, entering the Autumn Festival Tag Tournament alongside his tag team partner Jamal. They advanced to the final round, where they were defeated by Toshiaki Kawada and Taichi Ishikari.

Funkster's final match with All Japan took place on September 25, 2004, and was a losing effort, tagging with Gran Hamada and Jeremy Lopez against Akira Raijin, Masanobu Fuchi and Nobukazu Hirai.

=== Lucha Libre USA: Masked Warriors (2010–2011) ===
In July 2010, Funk began working under the name Chi Chi of the Exótico division for MTV2's wrestling TV project Lucha Libre USA: Masked Warriors, playing a parody of Lady Gaga. He made his debut on the first episode on July 16 along with his best friend Tigresa Caliente. Funk retired in August 2011.

== Championships and accomplishments ==
- Total Nonstop Action Wrestling
  - Miss TNA Crown Championship (1 time)
- Other titles
  - BTW Ohio Tag Team Championship (1 time)

== See also ==
- List of exóticos
