= El Oriental =

Mexican professional wrestler

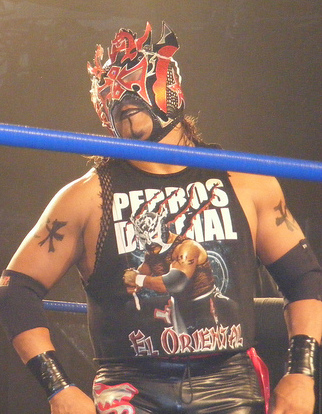
- El Oriental in April 2010

Personal information
- Born: Noé Astro Moreno León; December 6, 1972 (age 53) Deportivo Sexenal, Mexico City, Mexico

Professional wrestling career
- Ring name: El Oriental
- Billed height: 1.68 m (5 ft 6 in)
- Billed weight: 80 kg (176 lb)
- Billed from: Nezahualcoyotl, Mexico State, Mexico
- Trained by: Blue Panther; Dr. Wagner; Alfonso "Acorazado" Moreno
- Debut: October 23, 1992

Noé Astro Moreno León (born December 6, 1972) is a Mexican professional wrestler known under the ring name El Oriental, currently works for Consejo Mundial de Lucha Libre (CMLL) but is mainly known for his almost 10-year-long stint in Asistencia Asesoría y Administración (AAA) along with his sisters Cynthia, Rossy and Esther Moreno. He is the son of wrestler and promoter Alfonso "Acorazado" Moreno and has worked over 70 tours of Japan.

== Professional wrestling career ==
The person who would later become known as El Oriental was born on December 6, 1972, son of Mexican professional wrestler and wrestling promoter Alfonso Moreno. Later on Moreno along with Dr. Wagner and Blue Panther trained El Oriental for his professional wrestling career. He made his debut on October 23, 1992, in Arena Azteca Budokan, the arena his father operated at the time. El Oriental adopted the ring name upon making his debut and has competed exclusively under that name since then. Early in his career he worked mainly in or around his home state of Ciudad Nezahualcóyotl, Mexico State, often working with his sisters Cynthia, Rossy and Esther Moreno.

=== Touring in Japan ===
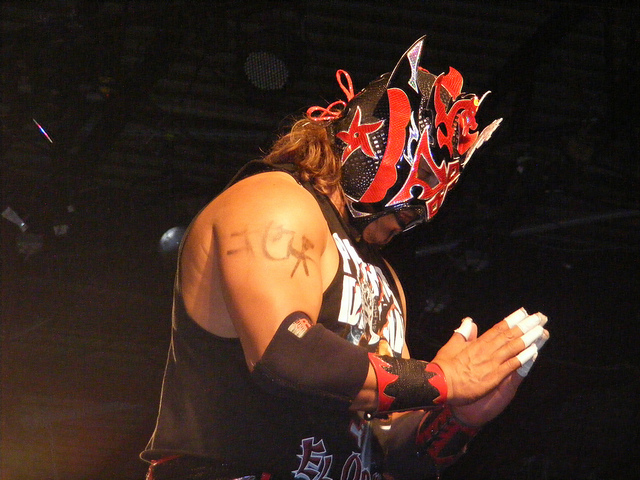
El Oriental showing respect for his opponent

El Oriental has made frequent tours of Japan, over 70 tours so far. He made his first tour of Japan early in his career as he worked for W*ING in 1995. Over the years El Oriental has learned to speak Japanese, which means that he was later used as a translator for other Mexican wrestlers touring Japan. In the late 1990s he began working for Consejo Mundial de Lucha Libre's (CMLL) Japanese affiliate CMLL Japan, which co-promoted shows with Japanese-based Osaka Pro Wrestling. In Japan he became the frequent tag team partner of Tsubasa, with the duo winning the CMLL Japan Tag Team Championship in 1999. The team lost the belts to Masato Yakushiji and Naohiro Hoshikawa on July 2, 1999, shortly before CMLL Japan folded. El Oriental continued to work tours for Osaka Pro even after his association with CMLL ended. On April 4, 2000, El Oriental wrestled and lost to Abismo Negro during the second day of the Michinoku Pro promoted Super J-Cup. On December 24, 2000, El Oriental won Osaka Pro's Hirapar Cup, when he won a 13-man battle royal. During his time with Osaka Pro, he won the Osaka Pro Middleweight Championship on one occasion and also brought the MWF World Welterweight Championship into the promotion, when he lost it to Osaka Pro regular Kabuto Beetle on his last appearance for the promotion.

In 2005 El Oriental began working for Pro Wrestling NOAH as a result of a developing working relationship between NOAH and Asistencia Asesoría y Administración which resulted in several extended tours of Japan. In August 2008 El Oriental, along with Laredo Kid, Histeria and Antifaz travelled to Japan to compete on Pro Wrestling NOAH's 2007 "Shiny Navigation" tour that ran over ten events from August 19, 2007, until September 2, 2009. On most nights El Oriental teamed with Laredo Kid against Histeria and Antifaz, sometimes in six man matches teaming with Ricky Marvin while Histeria and Antifaz teamed with Rocky Romero. On September 3, 2009, on the last night in Japan Laredo Kid teamed with Super Fly to defeat Atsushi Aoki and Ippei Ota on a joint AAA/NOAH show called TripleSEM. On September 3, 2007, he took part in the tour ending, joint AAA/NOAH event called TripleSEM. He teamed up with Pimpinela Escarlata and Chikayo Nagashima to defeat Cassandro, Takashi Sugiura and Faby Apache. He has not worked in Japan since September, 2007.

=== Consejo Mundial de Lucha Libre ===
In the late 1990s El Oriental began working regularly for CMLL, the world's oldest wrestling promotion. During his time in CMLL El Oriental won the Distrito Federal Lightweight Championship and worked a storyline feud with Virus that started in a tournament to crown a new Mexican National Lightweight Champion. Damiancito defeated El Oriental in the finals and the two worked a rivalry centering about both guy's titles although neither changed hands during the feud. On September 18, 1998, El Oriental wrestled on CMLL's biggest show of the year, the CMLL 65th Anniversary Show where he teamed up with Sendero only to lose to the team of Virus and Halcon Negro Jr. The following year he wrestled on CMLL's 1999 Ruleta de la Muerte show, where he and his teammates Starman, Astro Rey Jr., Tigre Blanco and Mr. Águila lost to El Satánico, Zumbido, Valentin Mayo, Virus and Rencor Latino in an elimination match. El Oriental left CMLL not long after the Ruleta de la Muerte show, seeking better opportunities elsewhere.

=== Asistencia Asesoría y Administración ===
After leaving CMLL El Oriental quickly ended up working for CMLL's biggest rival Asistencia Asesoría y Administración (AAA). He made his first appearance at a major AAA event when he teamed up with La Parka, Héctor Garza and Máscara Sagrada to defeat the team of El Hijo del Solitario, Abismo Negro, Electroshock, Blue Demon Jr. at AAA's 1999 Guerra de Titanes show. Following that event El Oriental became involved in a storyline feud against Pentagón which saw El Oriental's sister Esther join him in the fight against Pentagón and his wife Xóchitl Hamada. The two met at the 2000 Rey de Reyes where Pentagón defeated El Oriental. In June 2000 Oriental teamed with his sister Esther for Triplemanía VIII, which took place in Tokyo, Japan. The team wrestled to a draw against Pentagón and Xóchitl Hamada as both teams were counted out.

On October 13, 2000, El Oriental defeated Super Crazy to win the UWA World Welterweight Championship, his first AAA promoted championship ever. He held the title until early 2001 when he was forced to vacate the title after being injured during a match. After recovering from his injury El Oriental participated in the 2002 Rey de Reyes tournament, but was eliminated by Cibernético in the opening round. At Triplemania X he was one of six wrestlers who participated in the main event. Each of the six wrestlers bet the hair of a referee on the outcome of the match. El Oriental represented referee Hijo del Tirantes in the match, but was not involved in the finish of the match as Heavy Metal pinned Sangre Chicana. Between late 2002 and mid-2003 El Oriental suffered various injuries that kept him out of the ring for long stretches of time. At the 2003 Guerra de Titanes Cynthia Moreno, El Oriental, Mascarita Sagrada and Pimpinela Escarlata defeated Faby Apache, Gran Apache, Mini Abismo Negro and Polvo de Estrellas in a Relevos Atómicos de locura match (Spanish for "Eight-man madness match"), a match that featured two teams of four, each composed of a male wrestler, a female wrestler, an Exótico wrestler and a Mini-Estrella In the mid-2004 El Oriental's sister Cynthia started a storyline feud with the Apache family, primarily Faby Apache and Gran Apache that would last until 2009. On August 1, 2004, Cynthia and El Oriéntal unsuccessfully challenged for the AAA World Mixed Tag Team Championship, losing to Gran Apache and Faby Apache. The teams would subsequently clash on several occasions, with the Apaches managing to retain the mixed titles each time. In 2005 the Apaches were forced to vacate the Mixed tag team titles, after which AAA held a tournament to crown new champions. Cynthia and El Oriéntal defeated Gran Apache and Tiffany in the semi-final and then defeated Chessman and La Diabólica in a one night tournament at Verano de Escandalo to become the new AAA World Mixed Tag Team Champions. Over the next 779 days Cynthia and El Oriéntal would repeatedly defend the Mixed tag team titles, including defending them on various independent shows. Their reign would come to an end in November, 2007 when they were forced to vacate the championship when Cynthia suffered an injury and was unable to defend the titles. While Cynthia was recuperating from an injury Gran Apache and Mari Apache won the vacant title as well as turning técnicos (good guys) in the process. When Cynthia returned to the ring she and her brother turned rudo (bad guy) when they attacked Gran and Mari Apache after a successful title defense. At the 2008 Verano de Escandalo Oriental and Cynthia Apache regained the AAA World Mix Tag Team Championship from the Apaches, making them the only team to have held the title twice. The Dinastia Moreno's second reign with the tag team titles turned out to be as active as their first, in fact El Oriental once claimed they defended the titles around 150 times, although records do not support such a claim. In mid-2009 Cynthia began appearing less and less on AAA shows, leaving El Oriental free to team up with Kenzo Suzuki and Sugi San to form a trio called La Yakuza, after the Japanese Mafia. The team started out with a series of victories, but were defeated by Los Psycho Circus at the 2009 Verano de Escandalo."AAA Verano de Escándalo 2009 (Resultados 21 agosto) – Dr. Wagner Jr. retiene el Megacampeonato – Aparece Gron XXX – Roxxi se presenta con AAA". Súper Luchas (in Spanish). August 21, 2009. Following the event Sugi San left AAA and La Yakuza disbanded. In the fall of 2009 both Cynthia and El Oriéntal left AAA, losing the Mixed Tag Team title to Faby Apache and Aero Star as their last match for AAA.

=== Independent circuit ===
After losing the Mixed Tag Team Championship El Oriental left AAA and began wrestling on the Mexican independent circuit, including making regular appearances for the Los Perros del Mal wrestling promotion. In Perros del Mal he often teamed with other wrestlers who had left AAA such as Charly Manson or Gran Alebrije. In the fall of 2009 Oriental and Rossy Moreno won the IVP Mixed Tag Team Championship, defeating longtime rivals Pentagón Black and Xochitl Hamada as well as La Diabólica and Zumbido to win the vacant championship. The brother / sister duo later won another Mixed Tag Team Championship called the VIP Mixed Tag Team Championship, again from Hamada and Pentagón Black, although it may have been the same physical belts used to represent the championships.

=== Wrestling in the United States ===
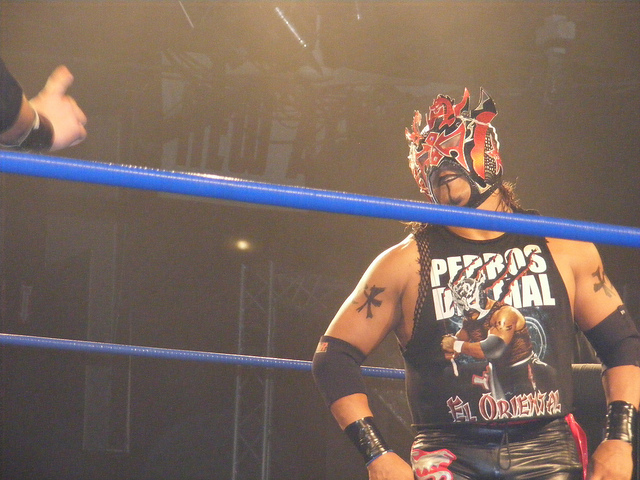
El Oriental representing Los Perros del Mal in Chikara

El Oriental had toured the United States on more than one occasion. His first tour of the US took place in 2004 where the Pennsylvania based Chikara booked him to work on four of their shows in November and December, 2004. During his first appearance he defeated Mike Quackenbush to win the IPW Mexican Lightweight Championship, a championship Chikara created for the occasion. He would later successfully defend the title against Skayde before returning to Mexico, never mentioning the title again. In 2010 Chikara invited El Oriental back for another tour. This time he was booked as part of their 2010 King of Trios tournament, where he formed "Team Perros del Mal" along with El Alebrije and Cuije. The trio defeated Team Delicioso (Curry Man, El Hijo del Ice Cream and Ice Cream Jr.) in the first round but were defeated by tournament winners Bruderschaft des Kreuzes (Ares, Claudio Castagnoli and Tursas). During the third day of the "King of Trios" event El Oriental lost to Chuck Taylor in a singles match.

During mid-2010 El Oriental began working for a newly created wrestling promotion, backed by MTV2 called Lucha Libre USA, wrestling on their first television taping on June 19, 2010. On January 22, 2011, El Oriental and Tinieblas Jr. became the first ever LLUSA Tag Team Champions by defeating the Puerto Rican Power (PR Flyer and San Juan Kid) and Treachery (Rellik and Sydistiko) in a three-way tag team match.

=== Los Invasores ===
In the spring of 2010 El Oriental began working for Promociones Gutierez in Nuevo Laredo and through this association began working with various CMLL wrestlers who made regular appearances in Nuevo Laredo as well. Through this connection El Oriental became associated with the Los Invasores storyline that featured CMLL wrestlers fighting against a number of former AAA wrestlers, his main opponent in the storyline was Místico. El Oriental and Místico teamed up for a five team Parejas Incredibles match on July 12, 2010, at the Promociones Gutiérrez 1st Anniversary Show where the losing team was forced to wrestle each other under Luchas de Apuestas, mask vs. mask rules. The other teams were Último Guerrero and Averno, Atlantis and Olímpico, El Alebrije and La Sombra, Histeria and Volador Jr. Místico and El Oriental ended up being the last team and were forced to wrestle for their masks. After a long match Místico defeated El Oriental. After the match El Oriental was forced to remove his mask and show his face. He announced that his real name was Noé Astro Moreno Leon, that he was 37 years old and had been wrestling for 18 years at that point in time.

== Wrestling trainer ==
Over the years El Oriental has trained or helped train a number of young wrestlers for their professional wrestling. While he does not run an official wrestling school he has trained a number of wrestlers at Arena Azteca Budokan. Some of the wrestlers El Oriental have trained include:

- Hijo de L.A. Park
- Flama Solar
- Extassis
- Dralion
- El Simbolo
- Kumo

== Personal life ==
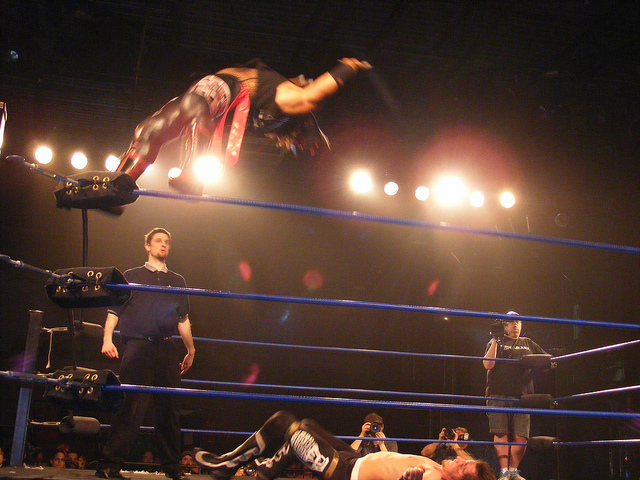
El Oriental performing a moonsault

Moreno is a member of an extended wrestling family founded by his father Alfonso Moreno, who was both a wrestler and a wrestling promoter, and his mother, who took over promoting wrestling in Arena Azteca Budokan in Nezahualcoyotl, Mexico State after Alfonso Moreno died. El Oriental's sisters Cinthia, Rossy, Alda and Esther are or have been professional wrestlers. He is the former brother-in-law of Dr. Wagner Jr. who was married to Rossy Moreno, he is also the uncle of Rossy and Wagner Jr.'s son who wrestles as Dr. Wagner III. He's also the former brother-in-law of wrestler Groon XXX, who was married to Esther. He is not related to the Moreno family that founded and promotes the International Wrestling Revolution Group promotion.

== Championships and accomplishments ==
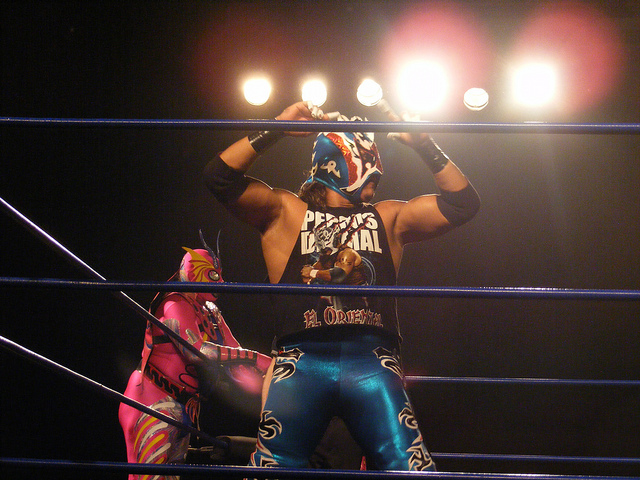
El Oriental during a Chikara show.

- Arena Azteca Budokan
  - Arena Azteca Budokan Welterweight Championship (1 time)
  - WPW Cruiserweight Championship (1 time, current)
- Asistencia Asesoría y Administración
  - AAA World Mixed Tag Team Championship (2 times) –Cynthia Moreno
  - UWA World Welterweight Championship (1 time) (Note: The title was promoted by AAA when El Oriental won it.)
- Chikara
  - IPW Mexican Lightweight Championship (1 time)
- Consejo Mundial de Lucha Libre
  - CMLL Japan Tag Team Championship (1 time) – with Tsubasa
  - Distrito Federal Lightweight Championship (1 time)
- Lucha Libre USA
  - LLUSA Tag Team Championship (1 time) – with Tinieblas Jr.
- Osaka Pro Wrestling
  - Hirapar Cup
  - MWF World Welterweight Championship (1 time)
  - Osaka Pro Middleweight Championship (1 time)
- Pro Wrestling Illustrated
  - PWI ranked him #137 of the 500 best singles wrestlers of the PWI 500 in 2000

== Luchas de Apuestas record ==
Winner (wager)	Loser (wager)	Location	Event	Date	Notes
El Oriental (mask)	Guerra C-2 (mask)	N/A	Live event	N/A	
El Oriental (mask)	Petronero (mask)	N/A	Live event	N/A	
El Oriental (mask)	El Migra (mask)	N/A	Live event	N/A	
El Oriental (mask)	Perro Silva (hair)	N/A	Live event	N/A	
El Oriental (mask)	Mando Amezcua (hair)	N/A	Live event	N/A	
El Oriental (mask)	El Puma (hair)	N/A	Live event	N/A	
Pentagón II (hair)	El Oriental (hair)	Naucalpan, State of Mexico	Rey de Reyes	March 5, 2000	(Note: Both wrestlers put the hair of their corner person on the line, Oriental's corner man was shaved bald after the match.)
El Oriental (mask)	M-3 (mask)	Nezahualcoyotl, State of Mexico	Live event	April 2, 1999	
El Oriental (mask)	El Fuhrer (mask)	Tijuana, Baja California	Live event	March 30, 2001	
El Oriental (hair)	Histeria (hair)	Nezahualcoyotl, State of Mexico	Live event	February 22, 2002	(Note: Lucha del reves: Hair vs. Hair between masked wrestlers.)
El Oriental (mask)	King Azteca (mask)	Tijuana, Baja California	Live event	February 7, 2003	
El Oriental (mask)	King Azteca (mask)	Tijuana, Baja California	Live event	October 22, 2004	
Místico (mask)	El Oriental (mask)	Nuevo Laredo, Tamaulipas	Promociones Gutiérrez 1st Anniversary Show	July 12, 2010	(Note: Last team in a 5-team Ruleta de la Muerte that also included Atlantis and Olímpico, Averno and Último Guerrero, El Alebrije and Volador Jr., Histeria and La Sombra.)
El Oriental (hair)	Scorpio Jr. (hair)	Ciudad Nezahualcóyotl, State of Mexico	Live event	September 16, 2010	(Note: Steel cage match that also included Marco Corleone, Black Warrior, Juventud Guerrera, Charly Manson and Zumbido.)
Scorpio Jr. (hair)	El Oriental (hair)	Ciudad Nezahualcóyotl, State of Mexico	Live event	January 1, 2012	(Note: Four-way match that also included El Intocable and Lizmark Jr.)
Black Silver Jr. (hair)	El Oriental (hair)	Tijuana, Baja California	Live event	May 16, 2014	
