= Lucha Libre USA =

2010s American professional wrestling TV series

- Also known as: Lucha Libre USA: Masked Warriors
- Starring: Lucha Libre USA roster
- Country of origin: United States
- No. of seasons: 2
- No. of episodes: 20 + 1 special (list of episodes)

Production
- Producers: Steven Ship, Louis Silverstein, and Alex Abrahantes
- Camera setup: Multicamera setup
- Running time: 42 minutes
- Production company: Lucha Libre USA

Original release
- Network: MTV2 (2010–2011); Hulu (2012)
- Release: July 16, 2010 – October 3, 2012

Lucha Libre USA (LLUSA) was an American professional wrestling promotion owned by Steven Ship. The promotion was most notable for producing the Lucha Libre USA: Masked Warriors television program, which initially aired on the MTV2 broadcast channel and chronicled the rise of lucha libre wrestling style in the United States. The first episode was aired on July 16, 2010. The second season premiered October 1, 2011. On July 11, 2012 the remainder of season two began airing on Hulu with the final episode airing on October 3, 2012.

== History ==
On July 16, 2010, Lucha Libre USA premiered season one of their flagship program Lucha Libre USA: Masked Warriors on MTV2. During season one Lucha Libre USA held TV tapings in multiple venues.

On October 1, 2011, Lucha Libre USA began season 2 of Lucha Libre USA: Masked Warriors airing the first four episodes on MTV2 before bringing the series to Hulu where the remaining episodes were aired.

After the cancellation of the Masked Warriors series by Hulu, the promotion continued to hold live events throughout the West Coast until its closure in 2013.

=== Behind the Mask ===
Behind the Mask was Lucha Libre USA's supplemental program and a documentary feature broadcast on MTV2 and the MTV website. The show followed wrestlers originating from Mexico, the United States and other parts of the world, as they performed physical acts and gave background into their characters. During the show it was explained that some traditional, non-masked American professional wrestlers, like técnico luchador Marco Corleone, had embraced Lucha Libre while others like American rudo luchador R. J. Brewer wished to "Americanize" Lucha by "cleaning up the Mexican elements" of Lucha Libre USA. This conflict between America and Mexico would serve as a long-lasting storyline throughout the seasons of Masked Warriors.

== Championships ==
=== LLUSA Heavyweight Championship ===
LLUSA Heavyweight Championship

Details
- Promotion: Lucha Libre USA
- Date established: December 12, 2010
- Date retired: October 21, 2013
Statistics
- First champion: Lizmark Jr.
- Most reigns: R. J. Brewer (2 reigns)
- Longest reign: R. J. Brewer (855 days)
- Shortest reign: El Solar, (0 days)
- Oldest champion: El Solar (56 years)
- Youngest champion: R. J. Brewer (31 years, 322 days)
- Heaviest champion: Lizmark Jr. (119 kg (262 lb))
- Lightest champion: R. J. Brewer (102 kg (225 lb))

On December 12, 2010, Lizmark Jr. defeated Charly Malice, Marco Corleone and R. J. Brewer in a Lucha Roulette four-way elimination match to become the first-ever LLUSA Heavyweight Champion.

#	Wrestlers	Reign	Date	Days held	Location	Event	Notes
1	Lizmark Jr.	1	December 12, 2010	188	Albuquerque, New Mexico	Lucha Libre USA: Masked Warriors	Defeated Charly Malice, Marco Corleone and R. J. Brewer in a four-way elimination match to become the inaugural champion. This episode aired on tape delay on October 1, 2011.
2	R. J. Brewer	1	June 18, 2011	855	Albuquerque, New Mexico	Lucha Libre USA: Masked Warriors	This was a three-way match, which also included Marco Corleone. Brewer put the future of his group, The Right, and Corleone his hair on the line for a shot at the title.
3	El Solar	1	October 20, 2013	0	Pomona, California	The Great American Nightmare tour	
4	R. J. Brewer	2	October 20, 2013	1	Pomona, California	The Great American Nightmare tour	
—	Deactivated	—	October 21, 2013	—	Pomona, California	—	The title was deactivated after the final LLUSA promoted event.

=== LLUSA Tag Team Championship ===
LLUSA Tag Team Championship

Details
- Promotion: Lucha Libre USA
- Date established: January 22, 2011
- Date retired: October 3, 2012
Statistics
- First champions: El Oriental and Tinieblas Jr.
- Most reigns: Tinieblas Jr. (2 reigns)
- Longest reign: The Right (Jon Rekon and Petey Williams) (473 days)
- Shortest reign: Sol and Tinieblas Jr. (0 day)
- Oldest champion: Tinieblas Jr. (45 years, 221 days)
- Heaviest champion: Jon Rekon and Petey Williams (221 kg (487 lb)) Combined (140 kg (310 lb)) Individual
- Lightest champion: El Oriental and Tinieblas, Jr. (188 kg (414 lb)) Combined; El Oriental (80 kg (180 lb)) Individual

On January 22, 2011, Rudisimo (El Oriental and Tinieblas Jr.) defeated Puerto Rican Power (P.R. Flyer and San Juan Kid) and Treachery (Rellik and Sydistiko) in a three-way tag match to become the first-ever LLUSA Tag Team Champions.

#	Wrestlers	Reign	Date	Days held	Location	Event	Notes
1	Rudisimo (El Oriental and Tinieblas Jr.)	1	January 22, 2011	126	Albuquerque, New Mexico	Lucha Libre USA: Masked Warriors	Defeated Puerto Rican Powers (PR Flyer and San Juan Kid), Treachery (Rellik and Sydistiko) in a three-way tag match to become the inaugural champions. This episode aired on tape delay on October 22, 2011.
2	Sol and Tinieblas Jr. (2)	1	May 28, 2011	0	Albuquerque, New Mexico	Lucha Libre USA: Masked Warriors	Defeated El Oriental in a handicap match.
—	Vacated	—	May 28, 2011	—	Albuquerque, New Mexico	Lucha Libre USA: Masked Warriors	The title was vacated due to the circumstances surrounding Sol and Tinieblas Jr. becoming the champions.
3	The Right (Jon Rekon and Petey Williams)	1	June 18, 2011	473	Albuquerque, New Mexico	Lucha Libre USA: Masked Warriors	Defeated the Latin Liberators (Rocky Romero and Super Nova) to win the vacant title.
—	Deactivated	—	October 3, 2012	—	Albuquerque, New Mexico	—	The titles were deactivated after the final episode of Masked Warriors .

== Roster at the time of closure ==
=== Male wrestlers ===
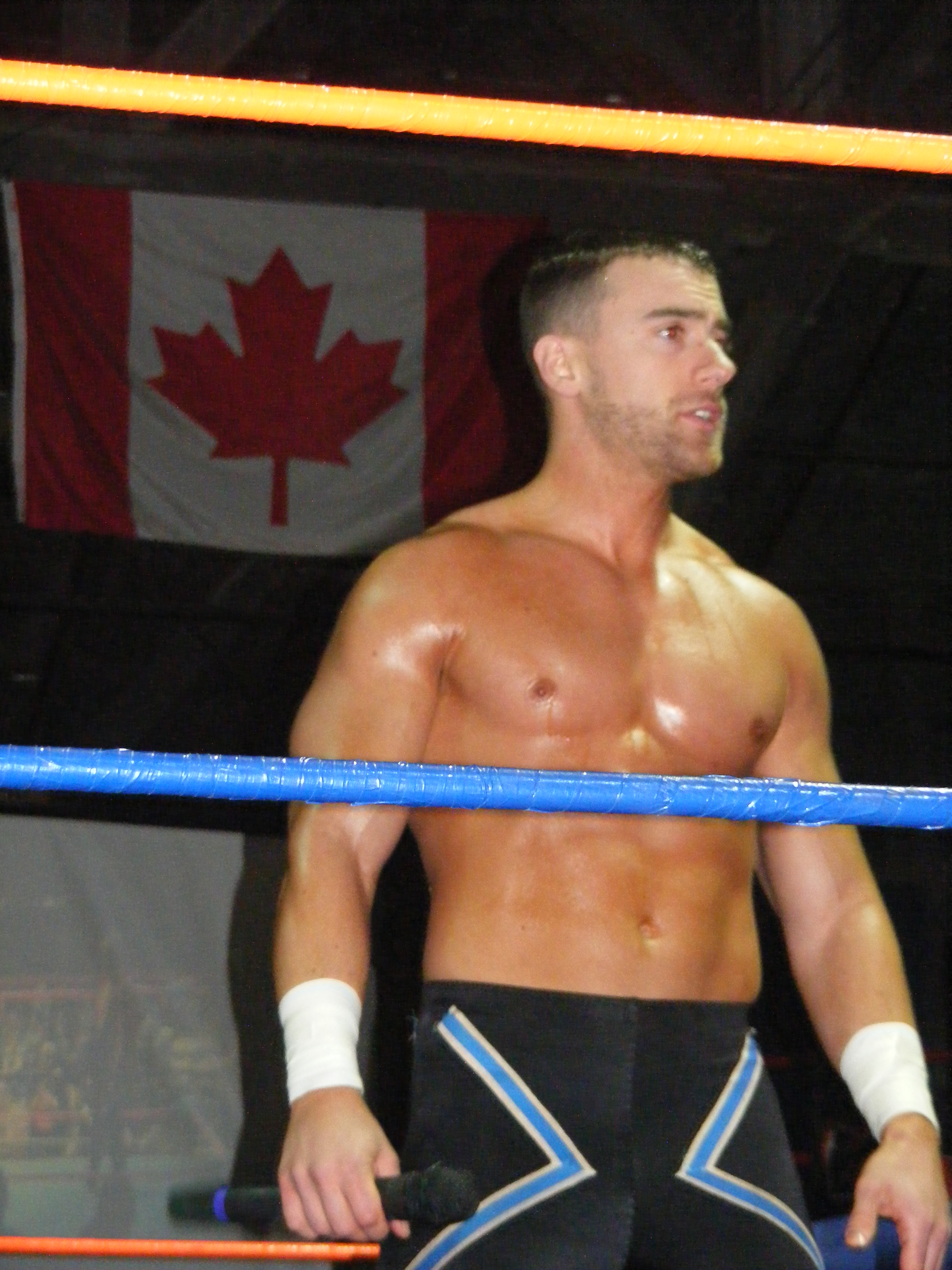
R. J. Brewer

Ring name	Real name	Notes
Azteko	John Rivera	Also performed unmasked as "Rocky Romero"
Blue Demon, Jr.	Unknown	
Carlitos	Carly Colón	
Celestial	Unknown	
El Nevo Macho	Unknown	
Shane Helms	Gregory Helms	
Jon Rekon	Jon Andersen	Last LLUSA Tag Team Champion
La Mascara	Felipe de Jesús Alvarado Mendoza	
Lizmark Jr.	Juan Baños	
Mini Park	Ricardo Moreno Tapia	
Águlia	José Delgado Saldaña	
Neutronic	Unknown	
Petey Williams	Peter Williams III	Last LLUSA Tag Team Champion
Pequeño Halloween	Samuel de Leon Sandoval	
Psicosis	Juan Ebodio Gonzalez	
R. J. Brewer	John Stagikas	Last LLUSA Heavyweight Champion
El Solar	Unknown	
Super Crazy	Francisco Islas Rueda	
Super Nova	Unknown	
Sydistiko	Theodore James Perkins	
Sydistiko II	Paul London	
Tatanka	Christopher Chavis	
Tinieblas Jr.	Unknown	
Vladimiro	Unknown	

=== Female wrestlers (Chicas) ===
Ring name	Real name
Awesome Kong	Kia Stevens
Brooke Carter	Brittney Savage
Jacqueline	Jacqueline Moore
Jillian Hall	Jillian Hall
Lizzy Valentine Carter	Elizabeth Miklosi
Melina	Melina Perez
Nikki Corleone	Nicole Raczynski
Nurse Krissy Sealice	Kristin Eubanks
ODB	Jessica Kresa
Rebecca Reyes	Rebecca Reyes
Rosetta Park	Tracy Castillo-Sharrer
Tigresa Caliente	Trenesha Biggers

=== On-air personalities ===
==== Hosts ====
Host	Dates
Reby Sky	July 16, 2010 – October 22, 2011

==== Commentators ====
Commentators	Dates
Nigel Sherrod and Lalo Gonzalez	Season 1
Kevin Kelly and Todd Romero; Kevin Kelly and Stevie Richards; Alex Abrahantes and Stevie Richards	Season 2

==== Ring announcers ====
Ring Announcer	Dates
Nigel Sherrod	Season 1
Leticia Castro	Season 2

== Notable alumni ==
- Cassandro
- Charly Malice
- Chavo Guerrero Jr.
- Chi Chi
- Diamond Face
- Dragoncito
- El Hijo de Anibal
- El Oriental
- Headhunter A
- Headhunter B
- Huracan Ramirez Jr.
- Isis the Amazon
- Jay Lethal
- Kip Gunn
- LA Park
- Lady Luck
- Latin Lover
- Lujo Esquire
- Marco Corleone
- Magno
- Mascara Púrpura
- Mascarita Dorada
- Medianoche
- Mentallo
- Mini Dragoncito
- Misteriosito
- Neutronic
- Octagoncito
- P.R. Flyer
- Reid Flair
- Rellik
- Saber Claw
- San Juan Kid
- Sol I
- Sol II
- Solid

== See also ==
- List of Lucha Libre USA: Masked Warriors episodes
