= Tinieblas Jr. =

Mexican professional wrestler (born 1966)

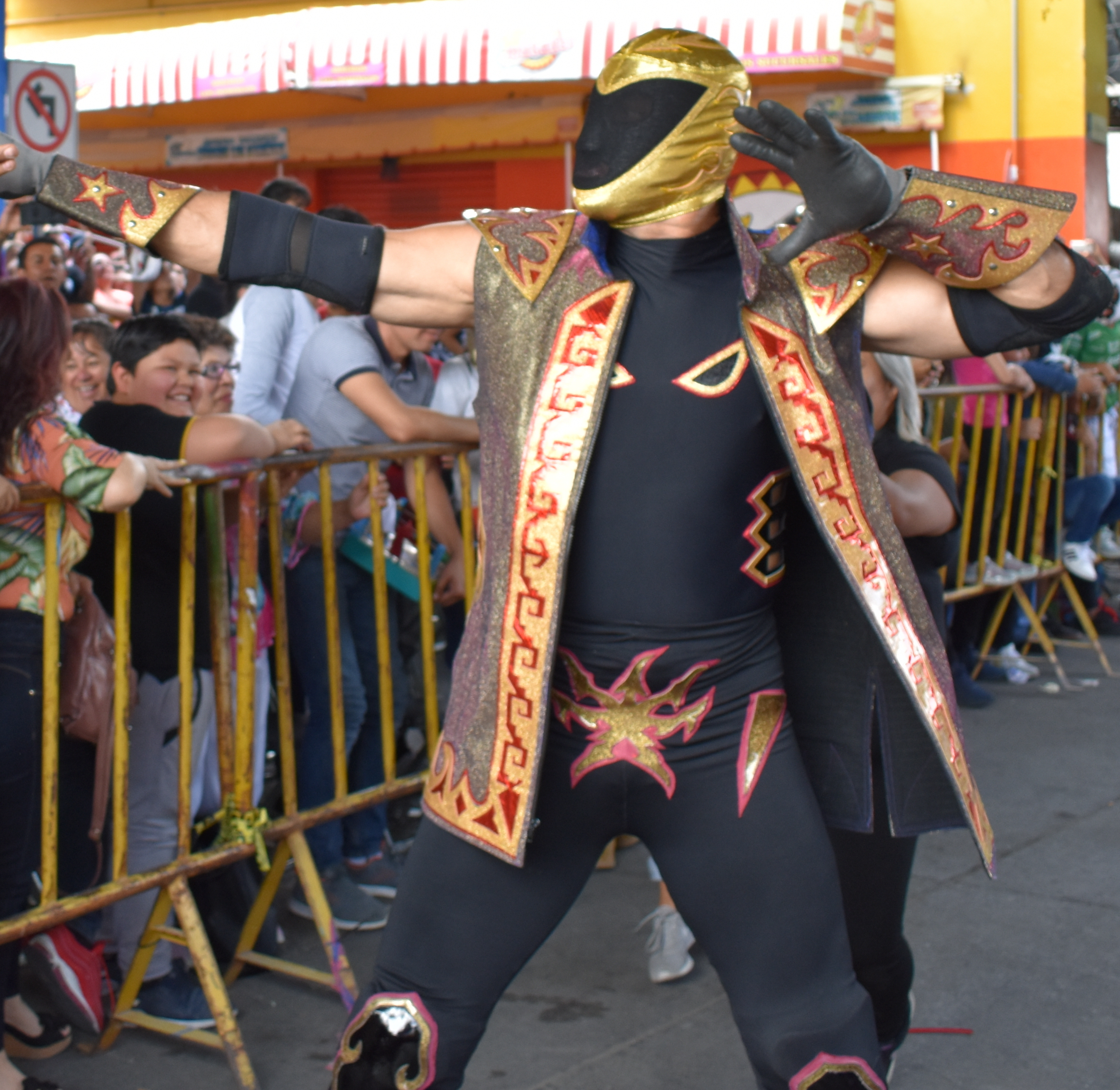
- Tinieblas Jr. in 2020

Personal information
- Born: Manuel Leal Navarro; May 26, 1966 (age 60) Mexico City, Mexico

Professional wrestling career
- Ring name(s): Tinieblas II; Tinieblas Jr.
- Billed height: 1.93 m (6 ft 4 in)
- Billed weight: 108 kg (238 lb)
- Trained by: Fantasma de la Quebrada; Felipe Ham Lee
- Debut: June 8, 1990

Manuel Leal Navarro (born May 26, 1966), better known by his ring name Tinieblas Jr., is a Mexican professional wrestler. He is the son of Manuel Leal, who wrestled for many years as Tinieblas. "Tinieblas" is Spanish for "Darkness".

== Professional wrestling career ==
Tinieblas Jr. made his professional wrestling debut in 1990, wearing a mask closely resembling that of his father Tinieblas.

=== Lucha Libre USA (2010–2011) ===
During the summer of 2010, Tinieblas Jr. began working for a newly created wrestling promotion, backed by MTV2 called Lucha Libre USA, wrestling on their first television taping on June 19, 2010. On January 22, 2011, Tinieblas Jr. and El Oriental became the first ever LLUSA Tag Team Champions by defeating the Puerto Rican Power (PR Flyer and San Juan Kid) and Treachery (Rellik and Sydistiko) in a three-way tag team match. He later turned on El Oriental, winning the tag team title with Sol, although the controversial circumstances surrounding the title change led to the title being vacated. His last match for LLUSA saw Tinieblas Jr. team up with Lizmark Jr., losing to El Oriental and Águila.

== Championships and accomplishments ==
- American Combat Wrestling
  - Copa Guerrera de Leyendas (1 time, current)
- International Wrestling Revolution Group
  - IWRG Intercontinental Heavyweight Championship (2 times)
- Lucha Libre USA
  - LLUSA Tag Team Championship (2 times) – with El Oriental (1) and Sol (1)
- World Wrestling Organization
  - WWO Heavyweight Championship (3 times)

== Luchas de Apuestas record ==
Winner (wager)	Loser (wager)	Location	Event	Date	Notes
Tinieblas Jr. (mask)	Cyclops (mask)	Mexico City	Live event	March 26, 1993	
Tinieblas Jr. (mask)	Chicano Power (mask)	Los Angeles, California	Live event	December 9, 1995	(Note: He only won half of the two part mask that Chicano Power wore, and was going to win the other half in a subsequent match that never took place.)
Tinieblas Jr. (mask)	Sangre Chicana (hair)	Tijuana, Baja California	Live event	June 22, 2007	(Note: Final two competitors in a six man match that also included Tinieblas, Fuerza Guerrera, Pirata Morgan and Espectro Jr.)
