= Magno (wrestler) =

Mexican American professional wrestler

Personal information
- Born: Oscar Vasquez; August 16, 1984 (age 42) El Paso, Texas, United States
- Family: Fusion Vasquez (brother)
- Website: Facebook page

Professional wrestling career
- Ring name(s): Magno; Oscar Vasquez
- Billed height: 1.86 m (6 ft 1 in)
- Billed weight: 98 kg (216 lb)
- Billed from: Mexico City, Mexico
- Trained by: Hector Rincon; El Pirata; Babe Sharon; Hurricane Hector; Norman Smiley
- Debut: 1999

Oscar Vasquez (born August 16, 1984) is a Mexican-American professional wrestler better known by the ring name Magno. Magno has wrestled extensively on the North American independent circuit, including appearances for Ring of Honor (ROH), Chikara, Lucha Libre USA and various National Wrestling Alliance (NWA) Affiliates, as well as Total Nonstop Action Wrestling (TNA). He also worked in WWE's developmental territory NXT under his real name.

== Professional wrestling career ==
Vasquez trained for his professional wrestling debut Ciudad Juárez, Juárez, Mexico at Gimnasio Municipal Josué Neri Santos, starting training there when he was 13 or 14 years old. Vasquez' main trainer at the facility was Hector Rincon but would also receive training from wrestlers under El Pirata, Babe Sharon and Hurricane Hector prior to his 1999 in-ring debut.

=== Independent circuit (1999–2015) ===
Vasquez made his in-ring debut in 1999 at only 14 or 15 years of age. Being born in El Paso, Texas to Mexican born parents Vasquez is a dual citizen of both the United States and Mexico,> and thus did not have to deal with work visas issues when traveling across the US/Mexico border for wrestling shows. Being able to freely travel between the two countries meant that the Ciudad Juarez-based luchador, would often be used a lucha libre representative on shows in the United States. Upon his debut he adopted the enmascarado (masked) wrestling character "Magno", which is a Spanish word for "Great" or "Magnificent". Prior to 2006 Magno was not well known outside the El Paso/Juarez area until Total Nonstop Action Wrestling (TNA) brought him in as part of Team Mexico in the TNA 2006 World X-Cup Tournament. Team Mexico also included Puma, Incognito, and Shocker, the team captain. During the tournament Shocker and Magno defeated Team Canada representatives Eric Young and Johnny Devine on May 4, 2006. Magno was also one of 16 participants in the final Gauntlet match at the 2006 TNA Sacrifice pay-per-view event, where he was the fifth man eliminated, thrown out of the ring by Jushin Thunder Liger. The team finished in 3rd place of the tournament with Team USA in 1st place and Team Canada in 2nd place while Team Japan was in last place.

Over the years Magno developed a long-running friendship/in-ring rivalry with Jorge Arriaga, then known as "Incognito" and later known as Hunico and the second Sin Cara. On 3 April 2009, Magno made his Ring of Honor (ROH) debut as the promotion held two shows in Houston, Texas. Magno teamed up with Jay Briscoe and Kevin Steen in a six-man tag team loss to Chris Hero, Eddie Edwards, and Incognito at ROH's "Supercard Of Honor 4" show. The following day Magno, Kevin Steen, Jay Brisco and El Generico defeated Hero, Edwards, Incognito and Davey Richards as part of ROH's "Take No Prisoners" show. Magno was one of the featured wrestlers for the short lived Lucha Libre USA (LLUSA) promotion that was active from 2010 to 2011 with shows on MTV2. His first storyline in LLUSA was against R. J. Brewer, who played the role of a xenophobic wrestler that wanted all Mexican Luchadors out of LLUSA and the United States in general. The storyline between the two led to a Luchas de Apuestas, or bet match, with Magno risking his mask and Brewer his hair on the outcome of the match. Magno pinned Brewer who was then forced to have all his hair shaved off as a result of the match. He teamed up with Máscara Purpura in the tournament to determine the first LLUSA Tag Team Champions, but lost in the first round to the Puerto Rican Powers (PR Flyer and the San Juan Kid). The storyline against R. J. Brewer would stretch into 2011, including Magno unsuccessfully challenging Brewer for the LLUSA Heavyweight Championship on August 27, 2011. He later challenged Lizmark Jr. for the same championship but was once again unsuccessful.

On the March 28, 2013 edition of TNA's Impact Wrestling Magno returned to TNA Television as it was announced that he would be competing in a TNA Gut Check match against Adam Pearce the following week. On the April 4, 2013 edition of Impact Wrestling Magno lost to Adam Pearce due to Pearce holding the ring ropes to win match. On the April 11th edition of Impact Wrestling, the storyline of the Gut Check Challenge played out so that Magno was denied a contract to TNA Wrestling as all three judges (Danny Davis, Bruce Prichard and Al Snow) all voted "no". On February 15, 2015, Magno defeated Cassandro and Boby Zavala in a three-way match to win the NWA World Welterweight Championship. When Vasquez signed with WWE later that year the NWA decided to strip him of the Welterweight championship.

=== WWE ===
On April 13, 2015, WWE announced Vasquez as part of a new class of trainees at the WWE Performance Center, with Vasquez wearing his Magno mask during the presentation. He stated that he would like to remain an enmascarado in WWE, but would be open to changing that if need be. He made his first in-ring appearance for the company at a NXT live event on January 15, 2016, wrestling under his real name losing to Manny Andrade. On February 5, 2016, Vasquez was released from his WWE contract.

== Championship and accomplishment ==
- National Wrestling Alliance

- NWA World Welterweight Championship (1 time)

== Luchas de Apuestas record ==
Winner (wager)	Loser (wager)	Location	Event	Date	Notes
Magno (mask)	Titanic (hair)	Ciudad Juarez, Chihuahua	Live event	N/A	
Magno (mask)	Rey Guerrero (hair)	Ciudad Juarez, Chihuahua	Live event	N/A	
Magno (mask)	Galactico (hair)	El Paso, Texas	Live event	N/A	
Magno (mask)	El Muneco Infernal (hair)	Ciudad Juarez, Chihuahua	Live event	N/A	
Magno (mask)	R. J. Brewer (hair)	Albuquerque, New Mexico	LLUSA show	January 22, 2011	
