= Reby Sky =

American professional wrestler

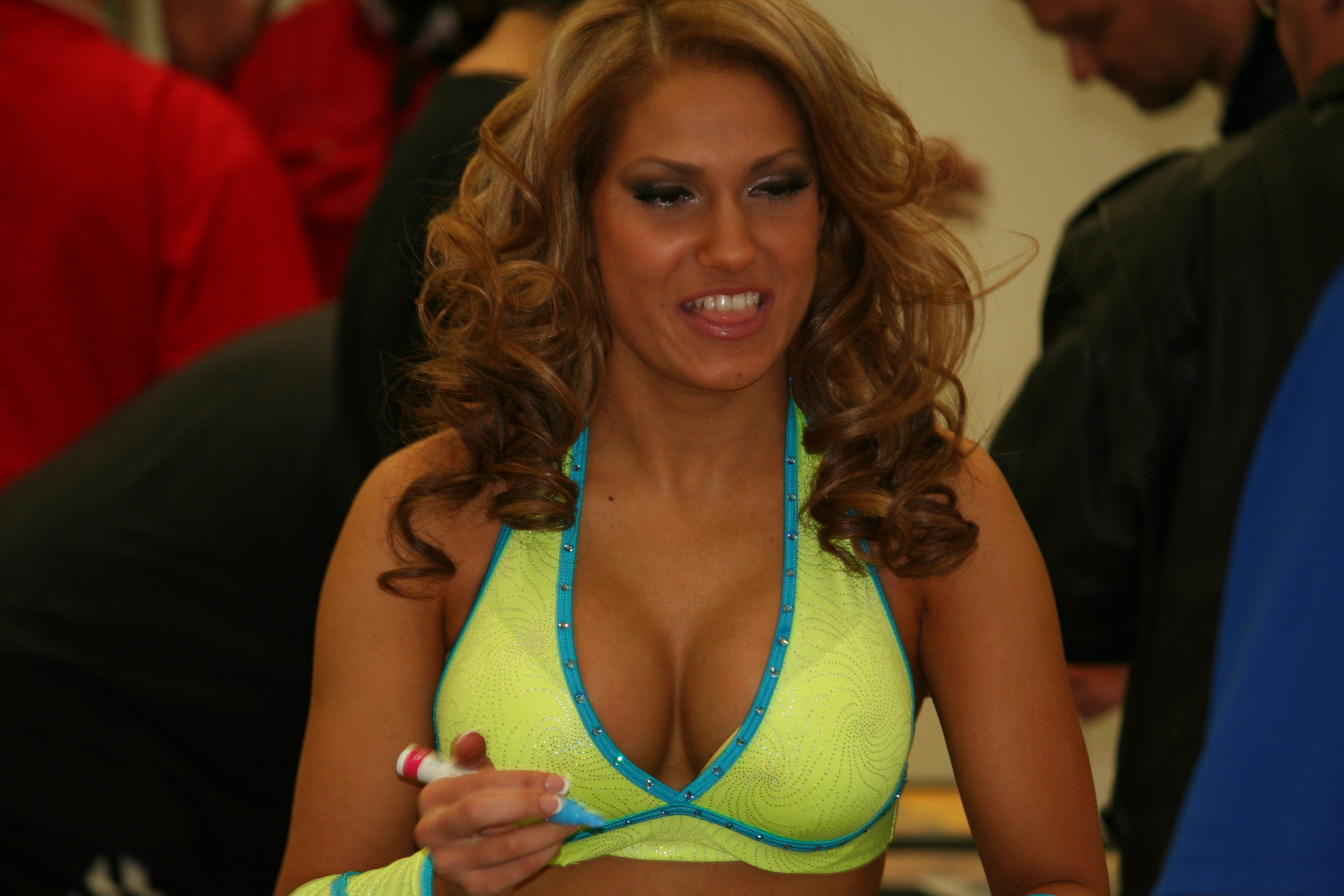
- Sky in 2011

Personal information
- Born: Rebecca Victoria Reyes; August 6, 1986 (age 39) New York City, U.S.
- Education: LaGuardia Community College
- Spouse: Matt Hardy (m. 2013)
- Children: 4
- Relative: Jeff Hardy (brother-in-law)

Professional wrestling career
- Ring names: Queen Rebecca; Rebecca Hardy; Rebecca Sky; Reby Sky; Reby Hardy
- Billed height: 5 ft 5 in (165 cm)
- Billed weight: 115 lb (52 kg)
- Billed from: Queens, New York; The Hardy Compound in Cameron, North Carolina
- Trained by: Matt Hardy; Pat Buck
- Debut: 2010

Rebecca Victoria Hardy (née Reyes; /ˈrɛbi/; born August 6, 1986) is an American actress, model, professional wrestler, and television personality. She gained prominence as a model, appearing in various magazines including Playboy, and later transitioned into professional wrestling. Reby is also known for her role in the wrestling storylines of her husband Matt Hardy, particularly during his "Broken" gimmick in TNA and AEW, as well as his "Woken" gimmick in WWE. She has also maintained a strong presence on social media and previously cohosted Busted Open Radio on SiriusXM.

== Early life ==
Hardy was born in Flushing, a neighborhood in the north central part of Queens, New York City. She is of Puerto Rican heritage. She has three older brothers and an older sister, Suzanne. Her father is a wrestling personality better known as "Señor Benjamin".

== Modeling and acting career ==
Hardy began her career in modeling, performing nationally with the Amira Mor International Entertainment Company, a belly dance troupe, with whom she also made several belly dance instructional DVDs. In 2005, Hardy held a supporting role in the off-Broadway musical, Secrets of the Desert. The show toured several off-Broadway venues, including the Duke Theatre on 42nd street in Times Square, and the DiCapo Opera House. Other notable venues Hardy has performed at Queens Theatre in the Park and New York City’s Radio City Music Hall, where she performed for The Beatles drummer, Ringo Starr. Reyes appeared in various television programs and music videos, including Midnight Spike (Spike TV), Date Patrol, Faking It and "Más Maíz," a music video featuring N.O.R.E. and Fat Joe.

Hardy appeared in a nude pictorial in Playboy magazine, "The Girls of Montauk", in July 2007, and as "Cyber Girl of the Week" in the July 2010 edition of the Playboy Cyber Club. She was later named "Cyber Girl of the Month" for November 2010. Sky has also appeared in GQ, Esquire magazine, Supermodels Unlimited, and STUFF. Rebecca was also interviewed in MTV’s True Life: I’m a Sports Fanatic, as the New York Giants Girl, airing on September 19, 2009. The show chronicled her involvement as a fan of the Giants. She sells a line of football fashion handbags via one of her websites, which also promotes her self-proclaimed Giants fanatic status as the NY Giants Girl. Hardy was named Miss Howard Stern TV for the month of December 2009 and was voted by Sirius Radio’s Howard Stern fans as "Miss Howard TV of the Year 2009″. In 2013 Hardy starred in the film Pro Wrestlers vs Zombies.

== Professional wrestling career ==
=== Lucha Libre USA (2010–2012) ===
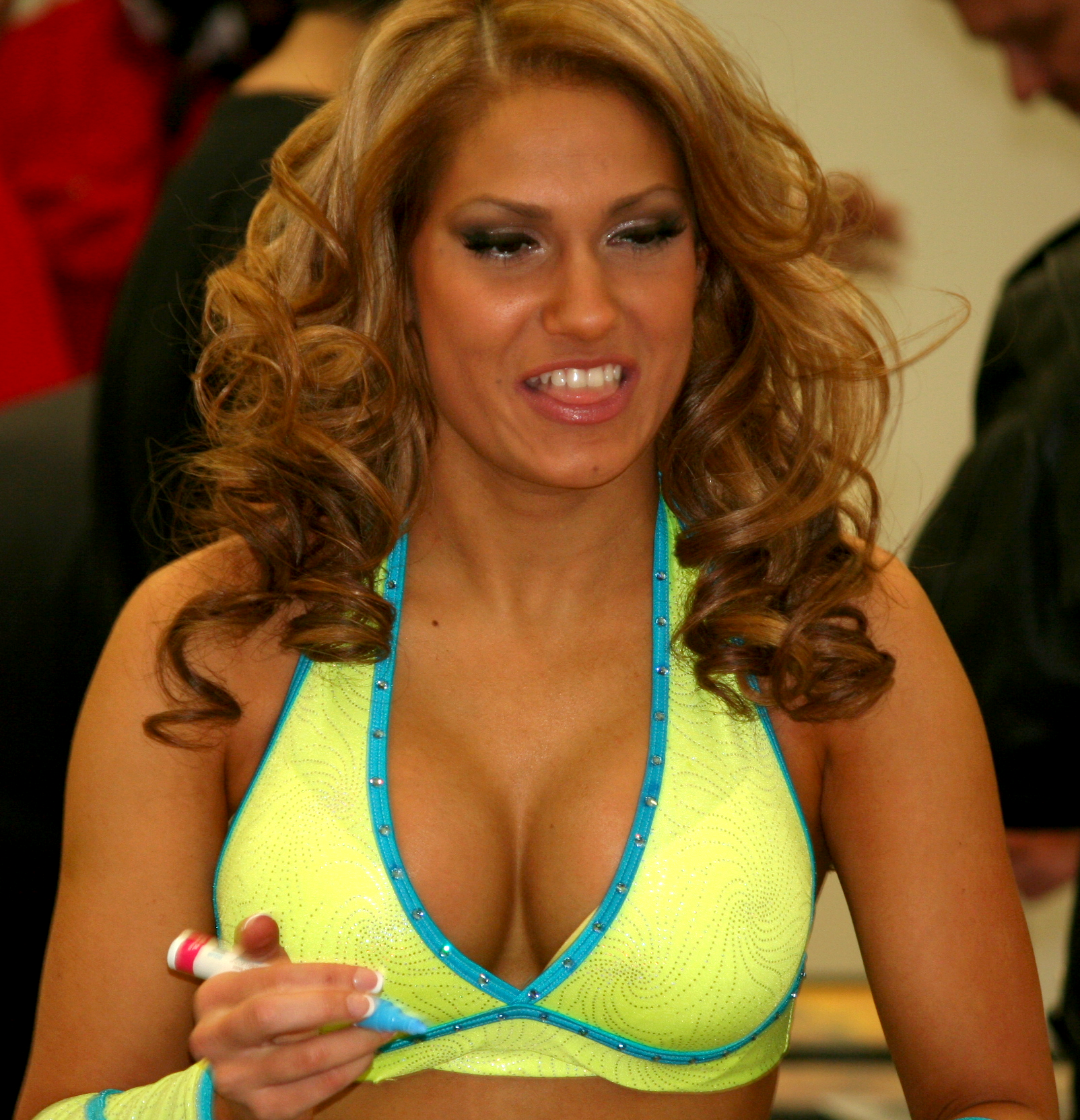
Sky in November 2011

In 2010, Hardy conducted interviews and commentary for the MTV2 program, Lucha Libre USA: Masked Warriors, a show focusing on the transition of lucha libre and related organizations to the United States. On March 19, 2011, Hardy made her professional wrestling debut at a Lucha Libre USA show under the ring name "Rebecca Sky", where she teamed up with Nikki Corleone and ODB against Chrissy Cialis, Jacqueline Moore and Tigresa Caliente. On the June 18 episode of LLUSA TV Tapings, Hardy teamed up with Chrissy Cialis and Vladimiro in a losing effort to Mini Park, Octagoncito and Pequeno Halloween in a mixed tag team match. In October, Hardy lost to Lady Luck in a lingerie match. She would return in 2012 during the second season, mainly teaming with Shane Helms in mixed tag team matches.

=== Shine Wrestling (2012−2013) ===
She made her debut for the new women's promotion Shine Wrestling on the inaugural show, as a face against Jayme Jameson, in a winning effort. On August 17, Hardy began a rivalry with Jessicka Havok after being viciously attacked by Havok with a chair injuring her after losing to her in a match. On October 19, Hardy faced off against Kellie Skater in a singles match, in a winning effort.

On January 11, Hardy was defeated by Havok after Matt Hardy threw the towel in to stop Havok's attack. On March 23, Hardy defeated Jessicka Havok in a Career vs. Respect match, causing Havok to shake Hardy's hand and respect her and ending the storyline rivalry between Hardy and Havok.

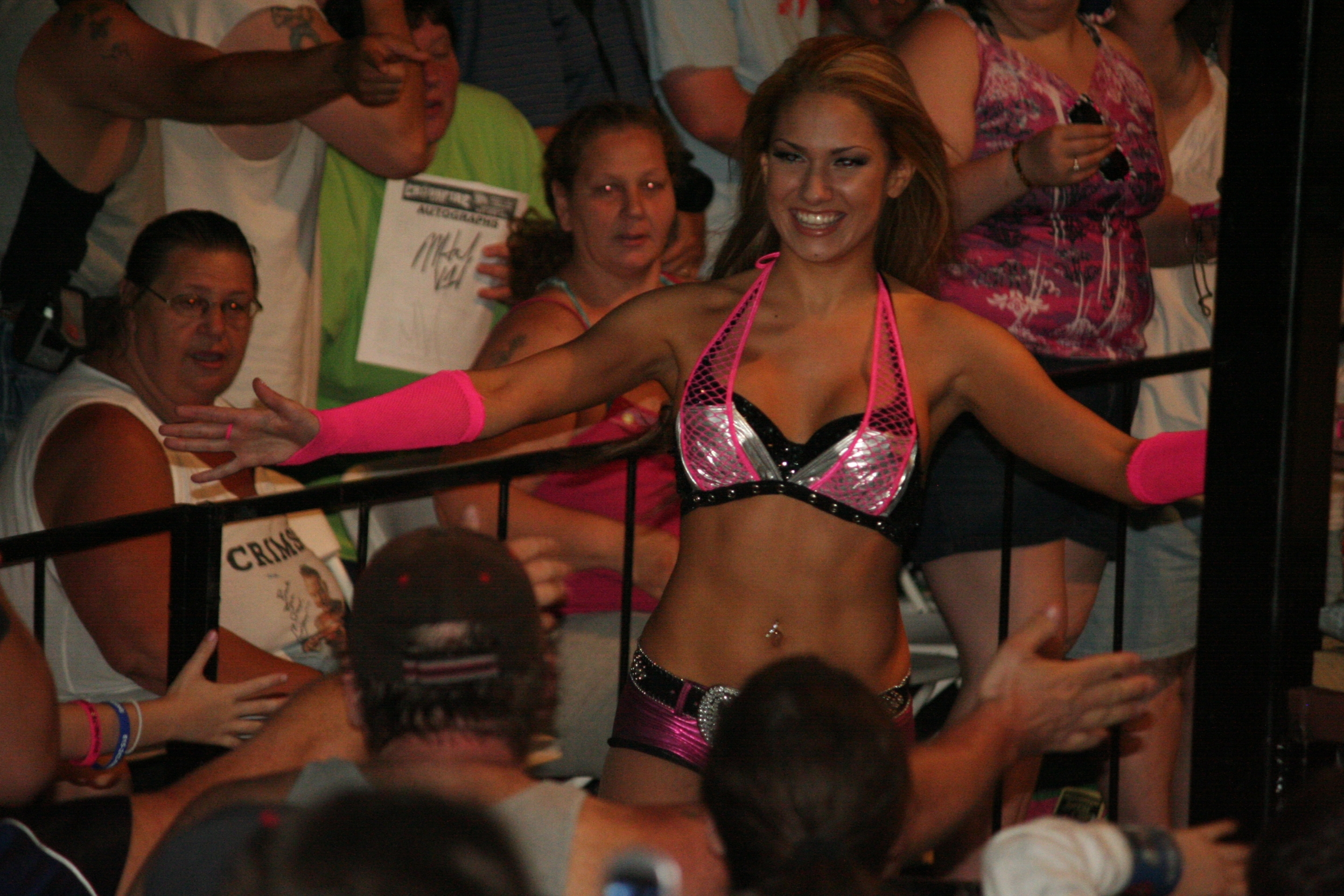
Sky making her way to the wrestling ring in May 2012

=== Independent circuit (2011–2015) ===
On July 1, 2012, Hardy made her independent circuit debut at Extreme Air Wrestling where she teamed with Paul London and Brian Kendrick to defeat Miss Jackie and The World's Greatest Tag Team. In 2012, Sky took on Jayme Jameson for the NWA Mid-Atlantic Ladies Championship on two occasions and lost both times. On March 9, Hardy was part of an infamous triple threat match which included Brittney Savage and Spyra Andover and was mentioned by Botchamania. With being engaged to Matt Hardy, she has appeared at several OMEGA events which Hardy owns. Hardy debuted for promotion Family Wrestling Entertainment at No Limits, where Hardy lost to Ivelisse Vélez.

Hardy made appearances in Vendetta Pro Wrestling competing singles match defeating Tab Jackson, Hudson Envy and Amber O'Neal.

=== Total Nonstop Action Wrestling (2014–2017) ===
In the year of 2014, Hardy appeared for TNA in May through the company's One Night Only PPV's mainly on Knockouts Knockdown 2 in a match against Velvet Sky in a winning effort also qualifying for the gauntlet match later that night. However, she was eliminated by Angelina Love.

Hardy appeared for TNA again in late 2015 at Bound for Glory celebrating with real life husband, Matt Hardy after he won his match for the TNA World Heavyweight Championship. Sky returned to Impact Wrestling on January 5, 2016, and watched as Hardy was defeated by Ethan Carter III in the finals of the TNA World Title Series. On the January 19 episode of Impact Wrestling, both herself and Hardy turned into villains after Tyrus helped Hardy defeat EC3 to capture the TNA World Heavyweight Championship.

On the September 1 episode of Impact Wrestling, The Hardys started a feud with Decay, involving her feuding with Decay's valet Rosemary, turning her into a face. On February 27, 2017, Hardy departed TNA, along with Matt and Jeff.

=== WWE (2018) ===
On the March 12 episode of Raw, it was announced that Hardy would make an appearance in the Ultimate Deletion match between her husband Matt and Bray Wyatt at the Hardy Compound. She also appeared the following week on Raw.

=== Return to Total Nonstop Action Wrestling (2024–present) ===
In June 2024, Hardy returned to TNA, assisting her husband Matt during his feud with The System at the Hardy Compound. At Against All Odds, she appeared during the Broken Rules match between husband Matt and TNA World Champion Moose, attacking Alisha Edwards but got speared through a table by Moose. On the July 4 episode of TNA Impact!, Hardy had her first in-ring match since August 2016, fighting alongside her husband Matt and winning a mixed tag team match against Alisha and Eddie Edwards.

== Personal life ==
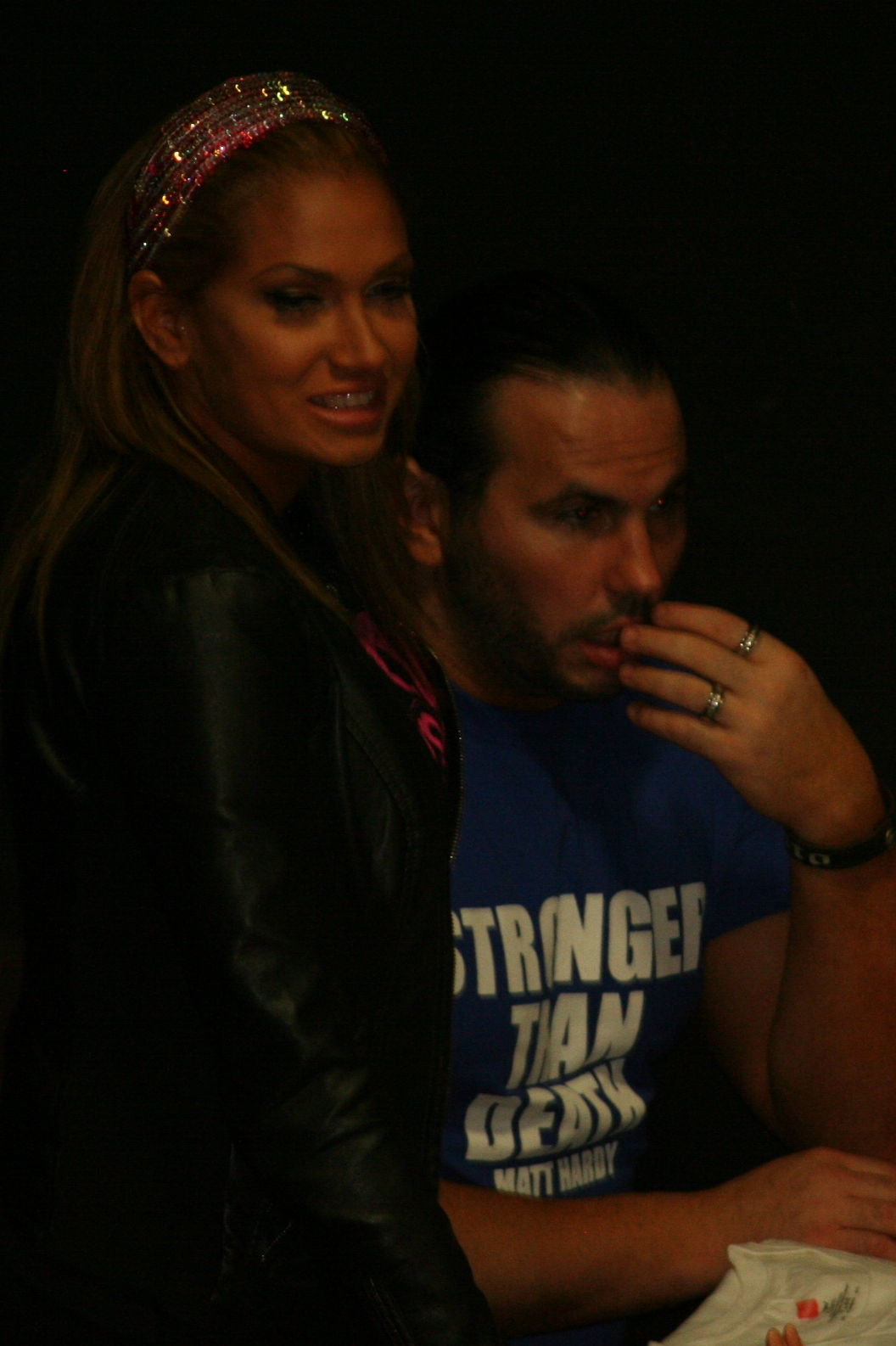
Sky with her husband Matt Hardy

In 2008, Reyes was sentenced to probation, a fine, and community service for opposing an officer without violence when police stopped her vehicle because it had a broken taillight in 2007 in Florida.

On October 5, 2013, she married fellow professional wrestler Matt Hardy. On June 23, 2015, they had their first child, a son, Maxel. On June 8, 2017, Matt and Reby welcomed their second son, Wolfgang. On December 4, 2019, Reby gave birth to their third son, Bartholomew. On January 8, 2021, it was announced that they were expecting a fourth child. On July 11, 2021, Reby gave birth to their fourth child, a daughter, Ever Moore, known as Evee.

== Filmography ==
Film
Year	Title	Role	Notes
2013	Pro Wrestlers vs Zombies	Herself	

Television
Year	Title	Role	Notes
2009	True Life	Herself	
2013	Boarding Pass	Herself	Host
2016	Vixens Who Rule	Herself	
