= R. J. Brewer =

American professional wrestler (born 1979)

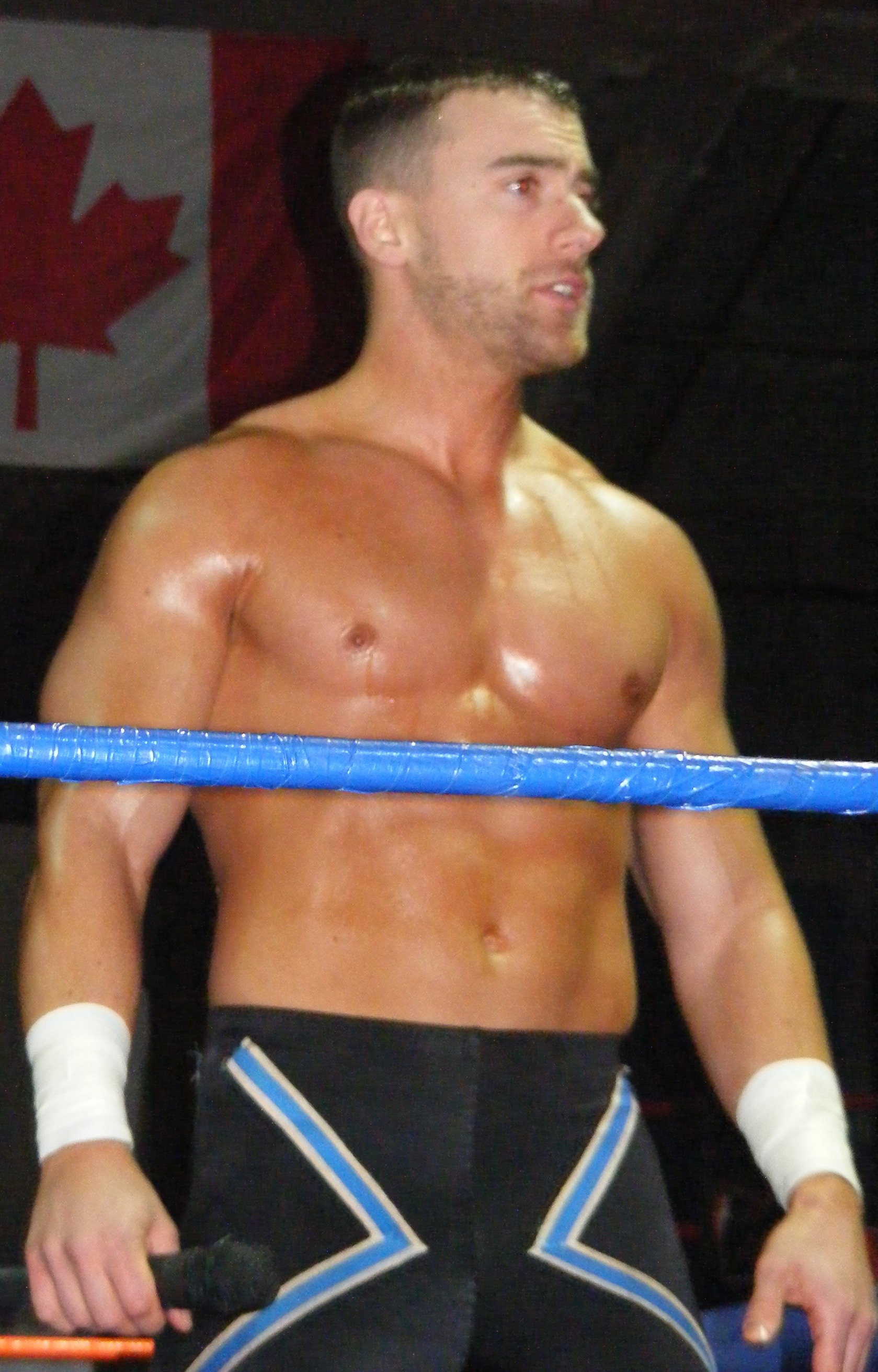
- Brewer in 2009

Personal information
- Born: John Stagikas; July 31, 1979 (age 47) Framingham, Massachusetts, U.S.
- Education: Assumption College

Professional wrestling career
- Ring name(s): John Walters; R. J. Brewer
- Billed height: 6 ft 0 in (183 cm)
- Billed weight: 225 lb (102 kg)
- Billed from: Framingham, Massachusetts; Phoenix, Arizona
- Trained by: Killer Kowalski; Mike Hollow
- Debut: 2001

John Stagikas (born July 31, 1979) is an American professional wrestler, better known by his ring name, R. J. Brewer. Brewer is known for his appearances with Lucha Libre USA, where he portrayed a conservative supporter of Governor of Arizona Jan Brewer and Arizona SB 1070 opposed to illegal immigration to the United States. He is also known for his appearances elsewhere on the independent circuit as "Hurricane" John Walters, including with Ring of Honor, where he is a one time Pure Champion.

== Early life ==
Stagikas attended Framingham High School, where he was a wide receiver on the football team and graduated in 1997. He also played volleyball and basketball in high school. He then attended Assumption College in Worcester, Massachusetts, where he played football for a further two years as a wide receiver until his career was ended by an operation to remove a cyst from his neck in his junior year. Stagikas graduated in 2001 with a degree in Communications.

== Professional wrestling career ==
=== Training and early career ===
After his neck surgery forced an end to his football career, Stagikas applied to several wrestling schools, and eventually joined Killer Kowalski's school in Malden, Massachusetts, on January 27, 2001. He trained under Kowalski for five months.

Stagikas adopted the ring name "John Walters" as a tribute to Kowalski, and later prefixed his name with "Hurricane" at the suggestion of a college roommate. He debuted in mid-2001 in battle royals, with his singles debut coming in August 2001, and began wrestling regularly on the Bostonian independent circuit, for promotions such as the World Wrestling Alliance, New England Championship Wrestling and Chaotic Wrestling.

=== Chaotic Wrestling (2001–2006) ===
Chaotic Wrestling (CW), based in Stagikas' home state of Massachusetts, was the first promotion where he got regular bookings. Here, he received supplementary training from Mike Hollow, a former trainer under Kowalski who had become the head trainer of the Chaotic Training Center. On September 7, 2001, in Lawrence, Walters defeated Slyk Wagner Brown in a match for the CW Television Championship. He lost the championship to CW Light Heavyweight Champion Dukes Dalton in Lowell, Massachusetts, on February 16, 2002, in a championship unification match.

In the course of his Television Championship reign, Walters formed a tag team known as 12 Pack with "Good Time" Vince Vicallo. The tag team partners were the epitome of a personality clash, as Walters had the wrestling gimmick of being a strait-laced, well-conditioned athlete, while Vicallo was known as a beer-drinking "party animal". On December 14, 2001, in Lawrence, 12 Pack defeated Edward G. Xtasy and Aaron Stevens for the CW Tag Team Championship. They lost the title to Adam Booker and Frankie Armadillo on July 13, 2002, in Lawrence. The former teammates then feuded for several months.

Walters challenged for the CW Heavyweight Championship at Summer Chaos on August 16, 2002, in Methuen, Massachusetts, and defeated Aaron Stevens for the title. Following a successful ladder match title defence against Vicallo, he began a lengthy feud with Luis Ortiz. Walters lost the belt to Ortiz on April 5, 2003, but regained it from Billy Kryptonite on January 16, 2004, in a "loser leaves Chaotic Wrestling" match. His second reign ended on March 13 of that year when he lost to Arch Kincaid.

Walters was a regular performer in Chaotic Wrestling until leaving the promotion in January 2006. Walters later returned to Chaotic Wrestling for one night in 2008 to wrestle Bryan Logan for the CW Heavyweight Championship. Walters was inducted into the Chaotic Wrestling Hall of Fame in February 2009. The same night, he defeated Chase Del Monte.

=== Ring of Honor (2003–2005, 2006) ===
Following the formation of Ring of Honor in early 2002, Stagikas sent a videotape of his work to the owners of ROH, but did not hear from them. After he met ROH ring announcer Gary Michael Cappetta at a Chaotic Wrestling show, Stagikas sent his résumé to ROH once more, and was contacted by booker Gabe Sapolsky in May 2003. Walters debuted in ROH on May 31, 2003, as a face, wrestling against Andy Anderson at Do Or Die. Walters entered the 2003 Field of Honor event, but was eliminated by Matt Stryker. He then began feuding with Xavier, facing him for the first time on September 20 at Glory By Honor II, and defeating him decisively on December 27 at Final Battle 2003 in a hardcore "Fight Without Honor".

On February 14, 2004, Walters entered a one-night tournament for the ROH Pure Championship, but was eliminated by CM Punk in the opening round. In mid-2004, he began a feud with Generation Next, a stable of young wrestlers with no respect for tradition. At Generation Next on May 22, 2004, Walters teamed with Jimmy Rave and the Briscoe Brothers to face Generation Next in an eight-man tag match, which Walters' team lost. At Testing the Limit in early August, Walters defeated Nigel McGuinness to earn a match for the ROH Pure Championship. Walters won the ROH Pure Championship from Doug Williams on August 28, and went on to successfully defend it against McGuinness, Homicide (wrestler), Jimmy Rave, and Jay Lethal. During this time, Walters joined Prince Nana's faction, known as The Embassy. After losing the Pure Championship to Jay Lethal on March 5, 2005, Walters left ROH in order to heal from several nagging injuries. Walters returned to Ring of Honor for one match on November 3, 2006, in Braintree, Massachusetts, competing in a losing effort to Nigel McGuinness.

=== Lucha Libre USA (2010–2013) ===
In 2010 Stagikas began wrestling for Lucha Libre USA. Under the ring name "R. J. Brewer", he adopted an anti-illegal immigration character who vows to "clean it up" and take the Mexican style out of the company. As part of the gimmick, he has wrestled in tights bearing SB1070, a reference to the Arizona SB 1070 Act, frequently enters the ring with the flag of Arizona draped around his shoulders, and claims to be the son of Arizona Governor Jan Brewer. The gimmick has garnered him much heat for his anti-illegal immigrant promos.

He participated in a number of matches in Season One feuding with Magno as well as a four-way match on the Season finale for the Lucha Libre USA Championship in which he was unsuccessful. In season two, Brewer formed an anti-Mexican stable called The Right with Petey Williams and Jon Rekon. At the tapings of the season finale on June 18, 2011, Brewer defeated Lizmark, Jr. and Marco Corleone in a three-way match, with help from the newest member of The Right, Stevie Richards, to win the Lucha Libre USA Championship. On October 20, 2013, Brewer lost the title to El Solar, but regained it later that same day. Brewer has claimed to turn down offers working for lucha libre companies in Mexico. Brewer was featured on ABC Nightline in January 2013. He has also had appearances on Fox News, CNN, The Geraldo Rivera Radio Show as well as being front page on publications like The LA Times and Harper's Magazine.

=== Other promotions (2002–present) ===
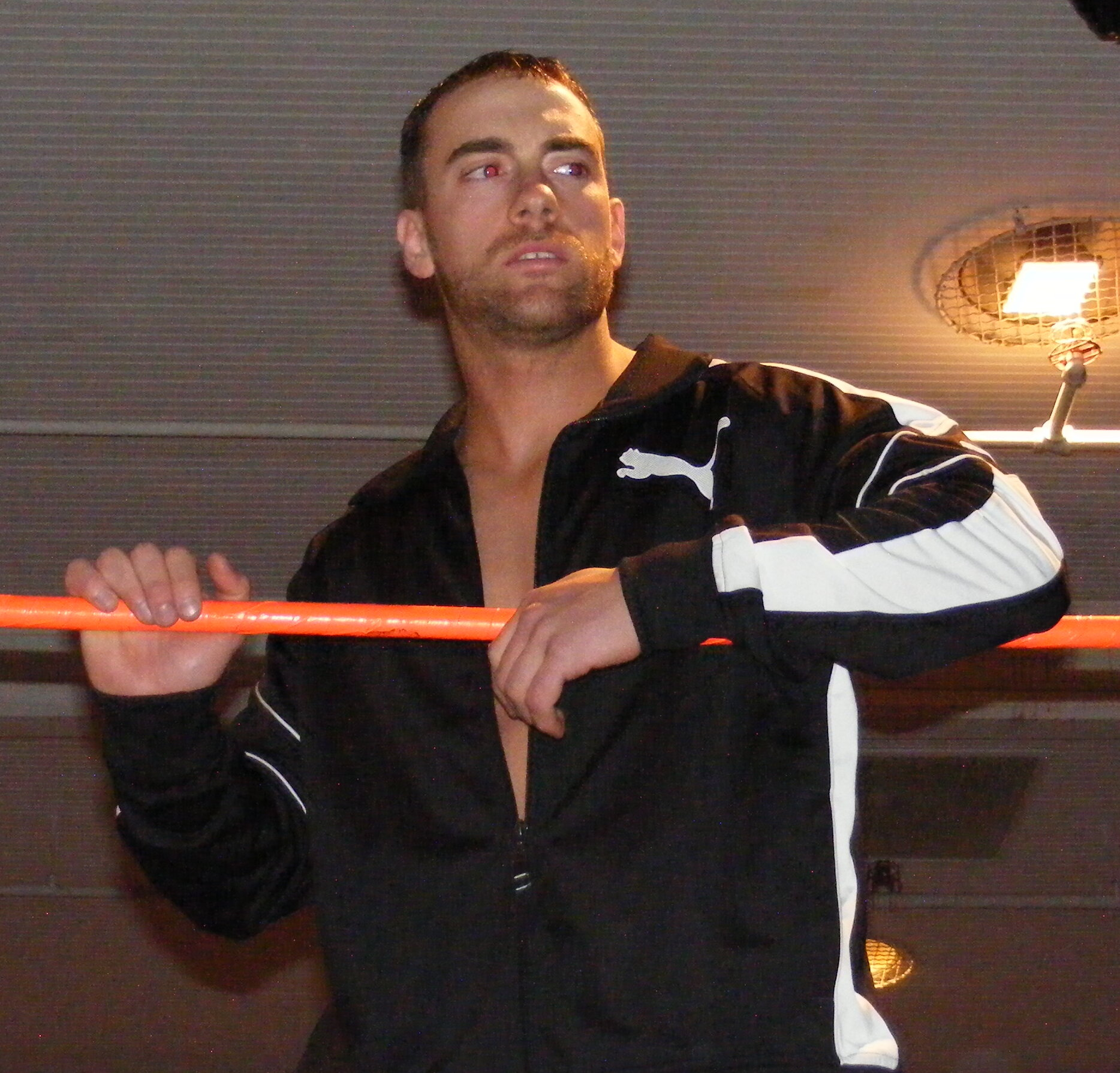
Walters in the ring in 2009.

After then-WWE employee Tom Prichard held a training seminar at Chaotic Wrestling in 2003, Stagikas began working sporadically for World Wrestling Entertainment as a jobber, facing Ohio Valley Wrestling mainstay Aaron Stevens in his first match for the company in April 2003. The following night, he faced Team Angle. His most prominent appearance was a loss to Big Show on the episode of SmackDown! preceding WrestleMania XX. At WrestleMania itself, on March 14, 2004, at Madison Square Garden, he accompanied The Undertaker to the ring while dressed as a black-clad druid and wielding a flaming torch.

Walters has also wrestled for the Maine-based Eastern Wrestling Alliance, winning both the EWA New England Heavyweight Championship and the EWA Heavyweight Championship. He has appeared for Jersey All-Pro Wrestling, Connecticut Championship Wrestling, and New England Championship Wrestling (NECW), where he won the NECW Heavyweight Championship by defeating Paul Lombardi on March 18, 2006. Walters has also worked for Big Time Wrestling, where he has held the BTW Heavyweight Championship.

In 2003, Walters began working for the East Coast Wrestling Association (ECWA). After winning a six-man qualifying bout on February 28, 2003, Walters took part in the eighth annual ECWA Super 8 Tournament on April 3, 2003. He defeated Nicho El Millonario in the first round of the tournament, but lost to Austin Aries in the semi-finals. On May 1, 2004, in Wilmington, Delaware, Walters challenged Christopher Daniels, who had won the ECWA Heavyweight Championship in the Super 8 Tournament semi-finals. Walters won a four-way match which also included Aries and Mike Kruel to become the new ECWA Heavyweight Champion. His reign lasted nine months, before he lost the title to Scotty Charisma in a five-way match on February 12, 2005, in Newark, Delaware.

In November 2020, he announced his return as a full-time wrestler.

== Personal life ==
Stagikas owns a villa in Costa Rica. After graduating, Stagikas trained shelter dogs and worked in real estate.

== Championships and accomplishments ==
- Big Time Wrestling
  - BTW Heavyweight Championship (3 times)
- Chaotic Wrestling
  - CW Heavyweight Championship (2 times)
  - CW Tag Team Championship (1 time) – with Vince Vicallo
  - CW Television Championship (1 time)
  - Second Triple Crown Champion
  - Chaotic Wrestling Hall of Fame (2009)
- East Coast Wrestling Association
  - ECWA Heavyweight Championship (1 time)
- Eastern Wrestling Alliance
  - EWA Heavyweight Championship (1 time)
  - EWA New England Heavyweight Championship (1 time)
- Lucha Libre USA
  - Lucha Libre USA Heavyweight Championship (2 times)
- National Wrestling Superstars
  - Chris Candido Memorial J-Cup Tournament (2010)
- New England Championship Wrestling
  - NECW Heavyweight Championship (1 time)
- Pro Wrestling Illustrated
  - PWI ranked him #144 of the top 500 wrestlers in the PWI 500 in 2012
- Ring of Honor
  - ROH Pure Championship (1 time)
- Squared Circle Wrestling
  - 2CW Heavyweight Championship (1 time)

== Luchas de Apuestas record ==
Winner (wager)	Loser (wager)	Location	Event	Date	Notes
Magno (mask)	R. J. Brewer (hair)	Albuquerque, New Mexico	Lucha Libre USA Live event	January 22, 2011	
