= Pico Rivera Sports Arena =

Arena in California, United States

Coordinates: 34.02582°N 118.04534°W

Pico Rivera Memorial Sports Arena
- Interactive map of Pico Rivera Memorial Sports Arena
- Address: 11003 Sports Arena Drive
- Location: Pico Rivera, California, U.S.
- Capacity: 6,250 (concerts); 5,000 (rodeo)

Construction
- Opened: 1979

The Pico Rivera Memorial Sports Arena is a multipurpose arena located in Pico Rivera, California, United States. It can seat a range of 5,000 to 6,250 patrons, depending on the event configuration. the Pico Rivera Sports Arena is a popular recreation spot for the Los Angeles area Hispanic community and is known for its Mexican charreadas, jaripeos and Latin entertainment. The arena is used for concerts, rodeos, professional wrestling and boxing.

== Background ==
This facility was built in 1979 and is reputed to be the largest Mexican rodeo ring in the country. The arena used to host Circus Vargas during their tour of the West Coast as well as many presentations of Antonio Aguilar, a regional Mexican music singer, and his family. An average of 25 shows, preceded by a traditional Mexican rodeo, are held at the Sports Arena every year. Today, it hosts some of the largest jaripeos, bailes, and charreadas in the country as well as music events. Colloquially termed as "Picolandia", these jaripeo events hosts around 5,000 to 6,250 people per event making it a popular site for Latinx people to congregate and engage in community and culture. Pico Rivera hosts PicoPride during the month of June where queer Latinx folks can go and engage in their cultural traditions whilst celebrating their sexual and gender identities.

As a concert venue, the Pico Rivera Sports Arena can seat up to 6,250. With a 132 ft (40 m) diameter arena floor, the arena is modeled after a Mexican rodeo ring. The arena, located at Bicentennial Park, is dedicated to Pico Rivera residents who fought for and served the United States during every war up to the Vietnam War.

In 2024, the arena was threatened with closure due to ongoing repairs at nearby Whittier Narrows Dam.

In January 2025, the arena was used to house livestock that were affected by the 2025 California wildfires.
