= Rhaka Khan =

American professional wrestler (born 1981)

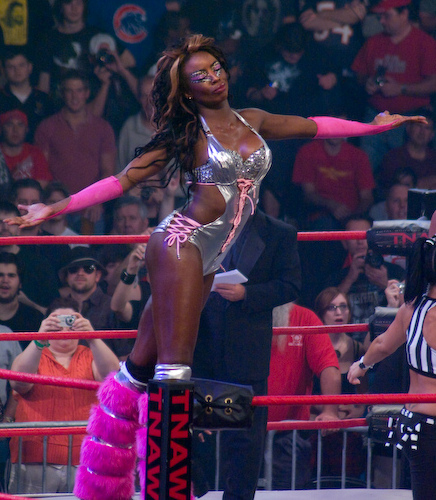
- Khan at Bound for Glory IV in October 2008

Personal information
- Born: December 25, 1981 (age 44) Champaign, Illinois, U.S.

Professional wrestling career
- Ring names: Black Barbie; Naomi Banks; Panther Claw; Rhaka Khan; Tigresa Caliente; Trenesha Biggers
- Billed height: 6 ft 2 in (1.88 m)
- Billed from: Champaign, Illinois; Chicago, Illinois; Isle of Man; Parts Unknown
- Trained by: Marty Jannetty; Bill DeMott
- Debut: 2005
- Retired: 2011

Trenesha Biggers (born December 25, 1981) is an American former model and professional wrestler. She is best known for her appearances with Total Nonstop Action Wrestling under the ring name Rhaka Khan; she also appeared with WWE as Trenesha, competing in the 2005 WWE Diva Search.

== Early life ==
Biggers played volleyball and basketball in high school while in Jacksonville, Illinois, and later while attending Illinois Central College in the 2000–01 season. She continued to play in both sports after transferring to the College of Southern Idaho for the 2001–02 season. In 2002, Biggers transferred to Florida State University where she lettered in volleyball.

== Professional wrestling career ==
=== World Wrestling Entertainment (2005–2006) ===
Biggers entered the WWE Diva Search, but was eliminated during the top 25. World Wrestling Entertainment later expressed interest in Biggers and signed her to a developmental contract. After signing a developmental contract with WWE, she was assigned to Deep South Wrestling. Biggers trained with Marty Jannetty for two months prior to reporting to Deep South Wrestling. Biggers debuted in DSW as the valet of The Regulators. Later, she and Angel Williams began a feud with Kristal Marshall, Tracy Taylor, and Michelle McCool. On February 9, 2006, Biggers participated in a bikini contest; however, there was no winner due to an interruption by Palmer Canon. Biggers and Williams later accompanied Canon in a match against Tommy Dreamer, who had McCool, Taylor, and Marshall in his corner. On May 4, 2006, WWE released Biggers from her developmental contract.

=== Independent circuit (2006–2008) ===
After WWE released Biggers from her developmental contract, she began wrestling for Japan's Pro Wrestling ZERO1-MAX promotion as "Panther Claw". She also worked for Florida's Full Impact Pro and Philadelphia's Women's Extreme Wrestling promotions. In Women's Extreme Wrestling, she worked under the name "Black Barbie" and later just "Barbie".

For the Professional Girl Wrestling Association, she worked as Naomi Banks. For a short time Biggers wrestled under the name "Trenesha" for underground female wrestling companies like Slammin' Ladies, Lady Victoria and Sleeperkid's World, adding to her fan base with various appearances in their clips and DVD releases.

=== Total Nonstop Action Wrestling (2008–2009) ===
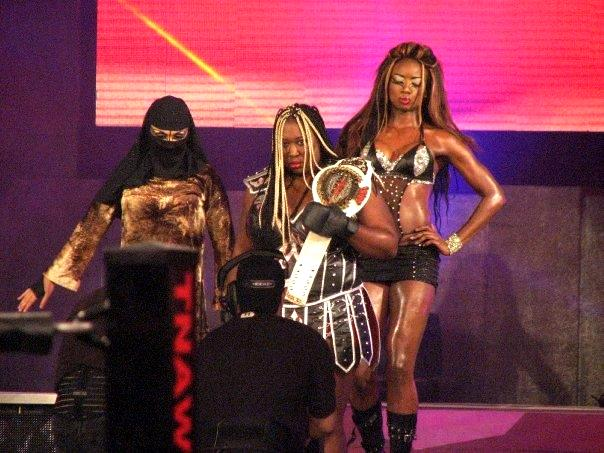
"The Kongtourage" in TNA

On February 10, 2008, Biggers made her Total Nonstop Action Wrestling debut at the Against All Odds pay-per-view. She distracted Petey Williams during his match against Scott Steiner, helping Steiner to win. On the following edition of Impact!, Steiner introduced Biggers as "Rhaka Khan" (the moniker a homage to soul singer Chaka Khan). She later managed Petey Williams in his matches. She made her in-ring debut on the March 27, 2008 live edition of Impact! alongside Steiner and Williams against The Latin American Xchange (LAX) and Salinas. Her team lost after Homicide pinned Williams with a bridging T-Bone suplex. At Lockdown, she participated in the first ever "Queen of the Cage" match, which was won by Roxxi Laveaux. At Sacrifice, she participated in the first ever "Make Over Battle Royal" won by Gail Kim. On the October 2, 2008, edition of Impact!, Rhaka Khan turned face and teamed up with ODB to defeat The Beautiful People. At Bound for Glory IV, she teamed with ODB and Rhino to defeat The Beautiful People and Cute Kip.

On the November 6 edition of Impact!, Khan turned heel and attacked her tag team partner, Taylor Wilde, during a match against Awesome Kong and Raisha Saeed. After the match, the evil Khan officially aligned herself with Kong and Saeed. The three of them were joined by Sojourner Bolt to form the stable known as Kongtourage, which began feuding with ODB, Christy Hemme, Taylor Wilde and Roxxi. On the February 26, 2009, edition of Impact! Khan and Bolt turned into fan favorites and defeated their former stable mates in a tag team match. In April 2009, both Rhaka Khan and Roxxi were suspended for 60 days (legit) after they got into a heated backstage altercation after Roxxi confronted Khan for working too stiff. She returned as an active wrestler on June 19, 2009, losing to Jacqueline at a house show in Grand Rapids, Michigan. She then appeared at another TNA house show in Johnson City, Tennessee on July 17, 2009 and lost to Daffney after receiving a botched Northern lights suplex which drove her headfirst onto the mat. The match was quickly ended and Khan was helped from the ring. On October 1, 2009, Biggers was released from her TNA contract and her profile and photos were removed from the "Knockouts" section of TNA's website.

=== Lucha Libre USA (2010–2011) ===
After leaving TNA, Biggers appeared in the first season of Lucha Libre USA, which later aired in mid-2010, as Biggers debuted under the name Tigresa Caliente. Tigresa was featured in a few matches and backstage segments including feuding with Mini Park. She would then align herself with Chi Chi. She returned again in the second season not with Chi Chi, but with Mini Park's ex-wife. It was during this season that Tigresa attempted to murder two minis, Mascarita Dorada and Octagoncito. On the first episode of the second season, Trenesha was managing his ex-wife. In the second episode she tagged with her in a losing effort. On the November 19, 2011 episode of Lucha Libre USA, Caliente teamed up with Chrissy Cialis and Jacqueline Moore in a losing effort to the team of Nikki Corleone, Rebecca Reyes and ODB.

== Personal life ==
Biggers was previously in a relationship with fellow professional wrestler Kurt Angle. On August 15, 2009, Biggers obtained a protection from abuse (PFA) order against Angle and had police officers remove him from his own house. The PFA was later voluntarily withdrawn by Biggers. On August 24, 2019, it was reported that Biggers had been placed on El Paso's most wanted fugitive's list for the week of August 25 on a charge of interference with child custody. Shortly following the police posting, a recording surfaced and circulated online of her ex-husband and a former independent wrestler, admitting to making several false police reports against her as well as false reports to Child Protective Services. She claims that he is currently on probation for beating Biggers unconscious.

On July 26, 2025 Biggers was arrested in New York City on a criminal trespassing charge. At 11:30 am she was led from her former midtown apartment. Tenants reported she remained on the premises in violation of an order of eviction she was previously served.

== Championships and accomplishments ==
- Pro Wrestling Illustrated
  - Ranked No. 46 of the top 50 female wrestlers in the PWI Female 50 in 2008.
