= Lizmark Jr. =

Mexican professional wrestler

Personal information
- Born: Juan Carlos Baños; October 16, 1972 (age 53) Acapulco, Guerrero, Mexico

Professional wrestling career
- Ring name(s): El Hijo de Lizmark; Lizmark Jr.
- Billed height: 1.88 m (6 ft 2 in)
- Billed weight: 119 kg (262 lb)
- Billed from: Acapulco, Guerrero, Mexico
- Trained by: Lizmark
- Debut: July 1, 1991

Juan Carlos Baños (born October 16, 1972) is a Mexican professional wrestler known as Lizmark Jr. or El Hijo de Lizmark (The Son of Lizmark). Baños previously worked for Consejo Mundial de Lucha Libre (CMLL) and Lucha Libre AAA Worldwide (AAA), the two largest professional wrestling promotion in Mexico. Lizmark Jr. works as a Rudo and has been a part of the Los Perros del Mal stable.

== Professional wrestling career ==
Lizmark Jr. is the son of the professional wrestler Lizmark, not just using the ring name as is at times the case in Lucha libre. Lizmark was a big star in Mexico in the 1980s and 1990s. Outside of Mexico, Lizmark Jr. is probably best remembered for his stint in World Championship Wrestling (WCW) where he was part of the groups Cruiserweight division in the late 1990s. In the 2000s, Lizmark Jr. started working for Consejo Mundial de Lucha Libre (CMLL), Mexico's top wrestling promotion and the oldest promotion still active today. Lizmark Jr. turned rudo, joined up with Los Perros del Mal and has been moving up the ranks to main eventing on a regular basis. He forms "Team Tall" with Black Warrior and Rayo de Jalisco Jr., with them he won the Copa de Arena Mexico Tournament in 2002. On September 28, 2007, Lizmark Jr. lost his mask in the main event of the CMLL 74th Anniversary Show, in a match called "Infierno en el Ring" ("Hell in the Ring"). Lizmark Jr. was pinned by Blue Panther, in a match that also involved Místico, Dr. Wagner Jr., Perro Aguayo Jr., Atlantis, Último Guerrero and Villano V, and took place inside a Steel Cage. On December 12, 2010, Lizmark Jr. defeated Charly Malice, Marco Corleone and R. J. Brewer in a four-way elimination match to become the first-ever LLUSA Heavyweight Champion. On March 13, 2011, Lizmark Jr. returned to Lucha Libre AAA World Wide (AAA), after a sixteen-year absence, re-joining Los Perros del Mal.

== Personal life ==
His father was the professional wrestler Lizmark, who died on December 16, 2015. He also has a brother, El Hijo de Lizmark.

He appears in the video game WCW Mayhem released in 1999.

== Championships and accomplishments ==
- American Independent Wrestling Alliance
  - AIWA World Heavyweight Championship (1 time)
- Consejo Mundial de Lucha Libre
  - CMLL World G1 Heavyweight Champion (1 time)
  - Copa de Arena Mexico: 2002 – Black Warrior and Rayo de Jalisco Jr.
  - Leyenda de Azul: 2005
- International Wrestling Revolution Group
  - Copa Higher Power (2011) – with Damián 666
- Lucha Libre USA
  - LLUSA Heavyweight Championship (1 time)
- Pro Wrestling Illustrated
  - PWI ranked him #141 of the 500 best singles wrestlers of the PWI 500 in 1997

== Luchas de Apuestas record ==
Winner (wager)	Loser (wager)	Location	Event	Date	Notes
Lizmark Jr. (mask)	Mascara Año 2000 (hair)	Acapulco, Guerrero	Live event	April 11, 2007	
Blue Panther (mask)	Lizmark Jr. (mask)	Mexico City	CMLL 74th Anniversary Show	September 28, 2007	(Note: Steel cage match that also included Perro Aguayo Jr., Místico, Último Guerrero, Dr. Wagner Jr., Atlantis, Villano V)
Lizmark Jr. and Shocker (hair)	Rey Bucanero and Black Warrior (hair)	Mexico City	Sin Piedad	December 12, 2007	
Marco Corleone (hair)	Lizmark Jr. (hair)	Mexico City	Live Event	October 17, 2008	
Mr. Niebla (mask)	Lizmark Jr. (hair)	Juárez, Chihuahua	CMLL show	July 20, 2019	(Note: The two lost a triangle Relevos Suicida match to the teams of Volador Jr. and Místico, Euforia and Gran Guerrero; were forced to wrestle each other as a result.)
