= Sal E. Graziano =

American professional wrestler

Personal information
- Born: Salvatore Valente The Bronx, New York, US

Professional wrestling career
- Ring name: Big Sal E. Graziano
- Billed height: 6 ft 9 in (2.06 m)
- Billed weight: 600 lb (270 kg)
- Billed from: Sicily, Italy
- Debut: 1998
- Retired: 2010

Salvatore Valente is a retired American professional wrestler, better known by his ring name, Sal E. Graziano. For three years in the Extreme Championship Wrestling from 1998 to 2001, he was a member of The Full Blooded Italians and mainly managed Little Guido.

== Professional wrestling career ==
=== Extreme Championship Wrestling (1998–2001) ===
Valente, a native of The Bronx made his pro wrestling debut in 1998 for Extreme Championship Wrestling. At 6"9 and 600 lbs, Graziano's physical fame stood out. When Tracey Smothers and Tommy Rich departed the company, leaving Graziano to manage Little Guido on his own. He feuded with Spike Dudley. The group became less of a comedy act and more of a serious tandem until Tony Mamaluke was added to the duo in early 2000. Together, managed by Graziano, the group feuded with Mikey Whipwreck and Yoshihiro Tajiri, a team led by The Sinister Minister, over the ECW World Tag Team Championship. Graziano defeated Balls Mahoney at Heat Wave (2000) making it his only pay-per-view victory. His biggest victory was when he defeated Scott Hall on November 11, 2000.

After ECW was bought by World Wrestling Federation in January 2001, Graziano left the wrestling business and retired.

=== Independent circuit and TNA (2009–2010) ===
Graziano would return to wrestling in 2009 since ECW folded in 2001. On June 29, 2009, Graziano reunited with The Full Blooded Italians at Legends of The Arena losing to The Blue World Order.

In August 2010, Graziano made an appearance for TNA Hardcore Justice (2010).

== Video Game Appearances ==
Valente has been included in several wrestling video games including ECW Hardcore Revolution, ECW Anarchy Rulz (video game), and the upcoming The Wrestling Code.
