= List of former Extreme Rising personnel =

Extreme Rising was a professional wrestling promotion based in Philadelphia, Pennsylvania from 2012 to 2014. Former employees in Extreme Rising consisted of professional wrestlers, managers, play-by-play and color commentators, announcers, interviewers and referees.

== Alumni ==
=== Male wrestlers ===
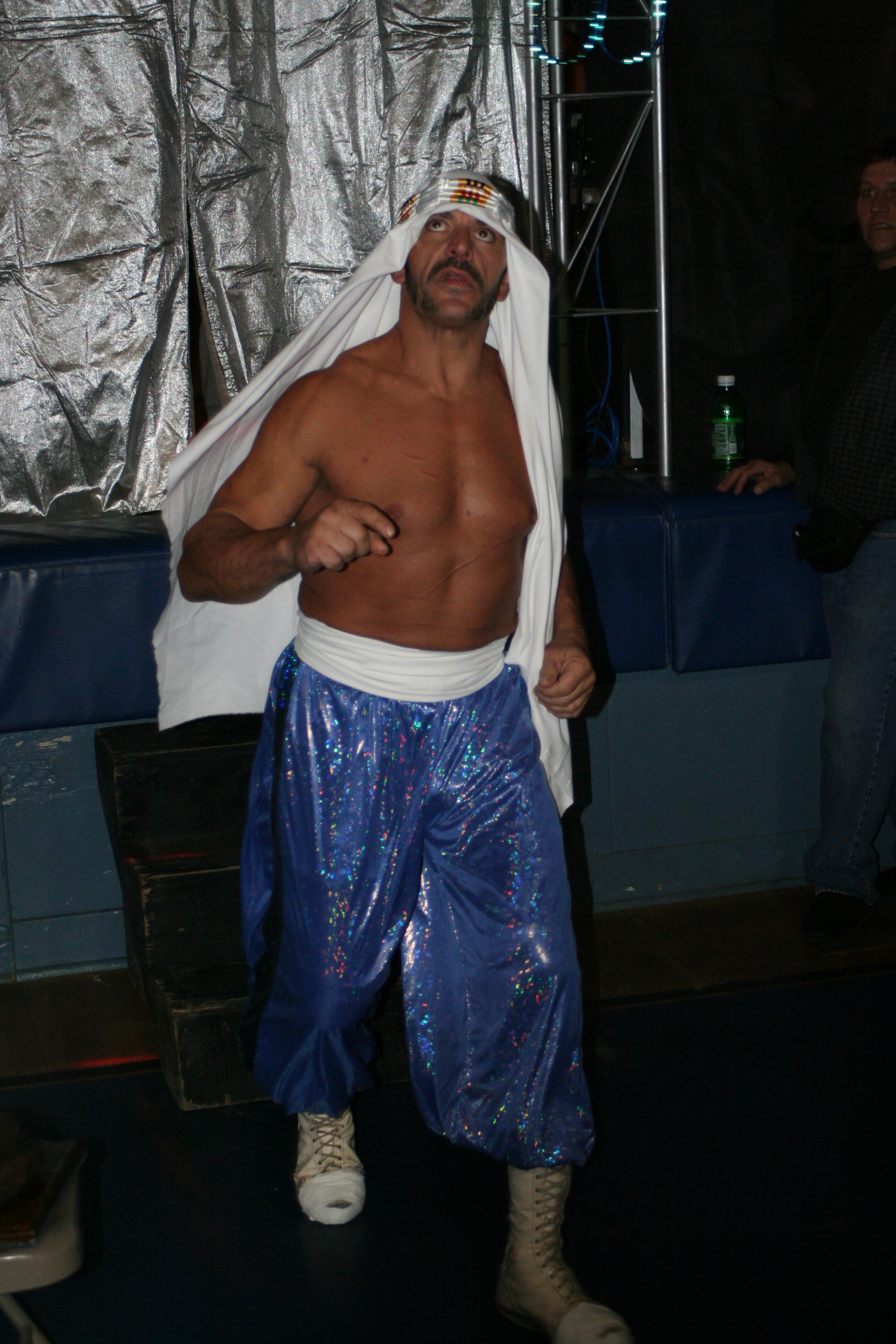
Sabu

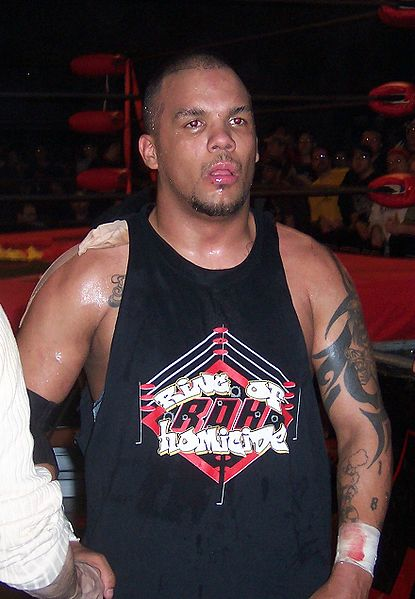
Homicide

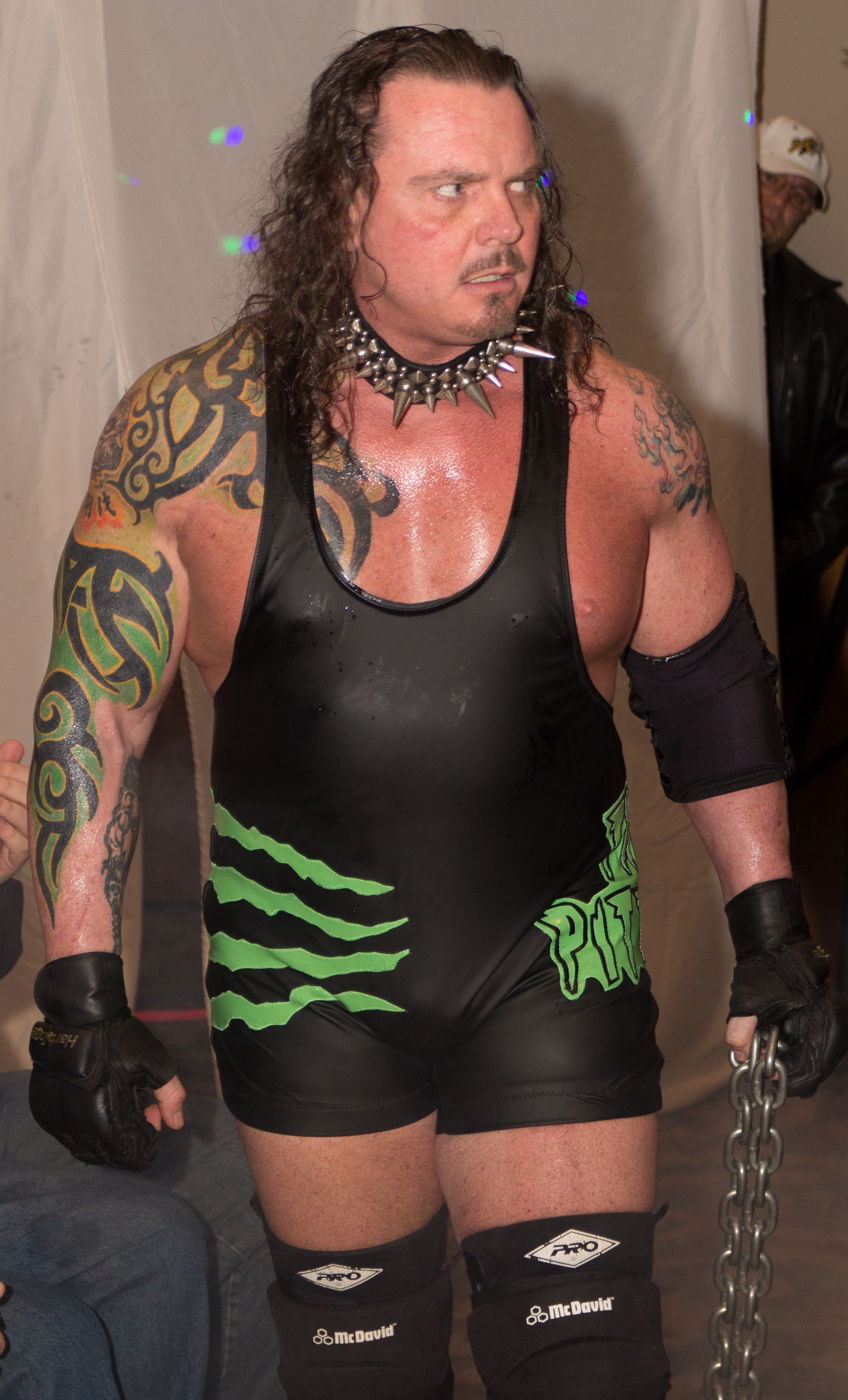
Pitbull #1

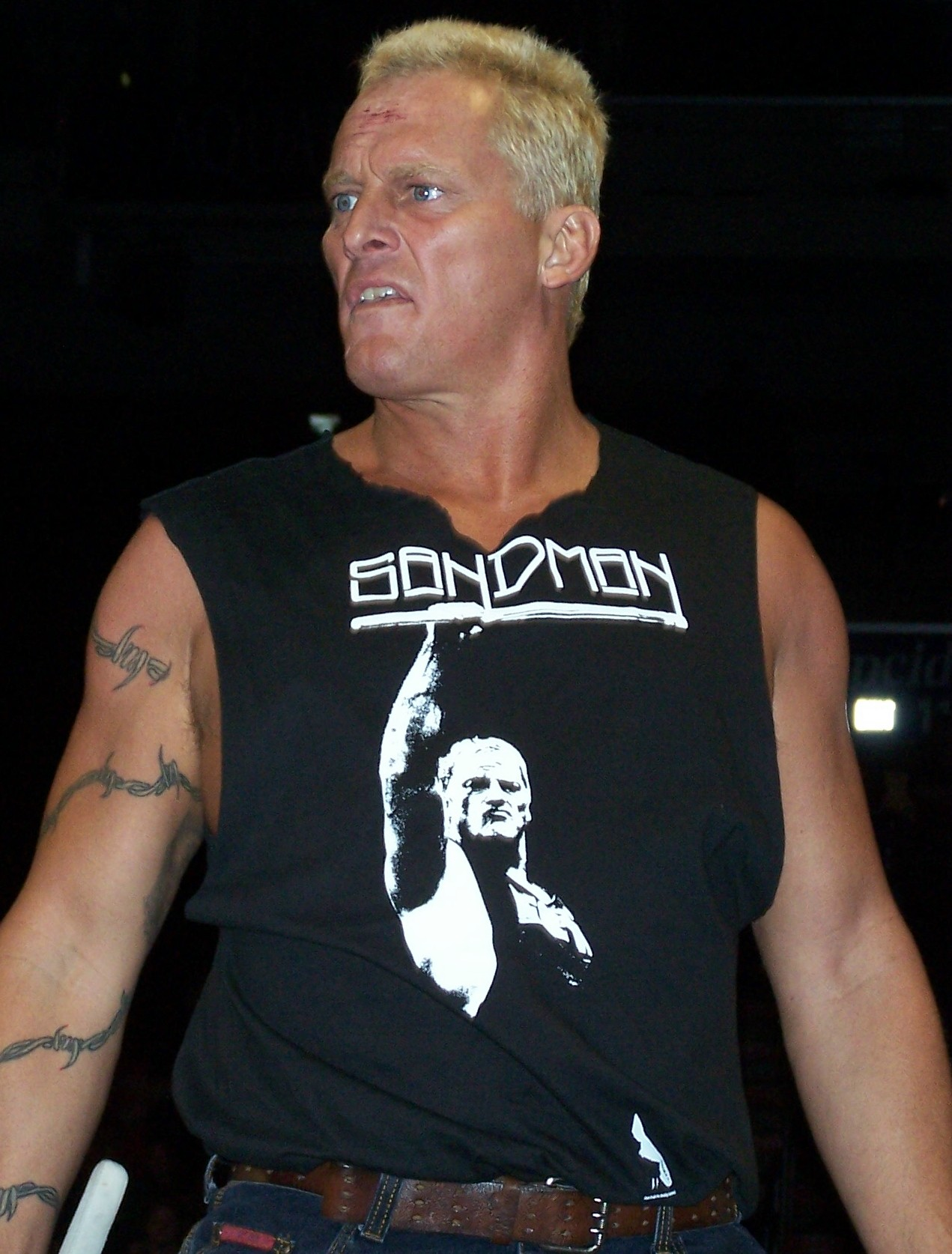
The Sandman

Birth name:	Ring name(s):	Tenure:	Notes
Tony Borcherding	2 Tuff Tony	2013	
Terry Brunk	Sabu	2012–2013	
Mike Cichowicz	Facade	2012–2013	
Steve Corino	Steve Corino	2013	
Nelson Erazo	Homicide	2012–2013	
Chris Ford	Devon Storm	2012–2013	
Jim Fullington	The Sandman	2012	
Terry Gerin	Rhino	2012–2013	
Leonardo Gómez	Damián 666	2013	
Matt Hardy	Matt Hardy	2012–2013	
Oren Hawxhurst	Luke Hawx	2012–2013	
Brian Heffron	The Blue Meanie	2012–2013	
Miguel Hernández	El Hijo de Rey Misterio	2012–2013	
Walter Kirney	Azrieal	2012	
Darnell Kittrell	BLK Jeez	2012	
Brian Knighton†	Axl Rotten	2012	
Scott Levy	Raven	2012	
Leornardo Lizarraga	Bestia 666	2012–2013	
Jerry Lynn	Jerry Lynn	2012	
Michael Manna	Stevie Richards	2012–2013	
James Maritato	Little Guido	2012	
Claude Marrow	Ruckus	2012	
Troy Martin	Shane Douglas	2012	
Jamal Mustafa	Mustafa Saed	2012	
Eddie Orengo	Bandido Jr.	2012	
Jay Pugh†	Jay Briscoe	2012	
Mark Pugh	Mark Briscoe	2012	
Julio Ramirez	Dramatic #2	2012	
Kelvin Ramirez	Dramatic #1	2012	
Jonathan Rechner†	Balls Mahoney	2012–2013	
Francisco Rueda	Super Crazy	2013	
Allen Sarven	Al Snow	2012	
Perry Satullo	Perry Saturn	2012	
Charles Scaggs	2 Cold Scorpio	2012	
Jason Spence	Christian York	2012	
Charles Spencer	Tony Mamaluke	2012	
Bradley Thomas	Jay Bradley	2012	
Matt Tremont	Matt Tremont	2012	
Gary Wolfe	Pitbull #1	2012	
Chris Wright	C. W. Anderson	2012	
Jerome Young†	New Jack	2012	
Richard Young	Ricky Ortiz	2013	
Rob Ziccardi	Robby Mireno	2013	
Alex Zikos	Alex Reynolds	2012	
Unknown	Blake Wilder	2012	
Unknown	Bolt Brady	2012	
Unknown	Brian XL	2012	
Unknown	Bu Ku Dao	2012	
Unknown	Jake Manning	2013	
Unknown	John Silver	2012	
Unknown	Matt Lancie	2012	
Unknown	Papadon	2012–2013	
Unknown	Pesadilla	2012–2013	

=== Stables and tag teams ===
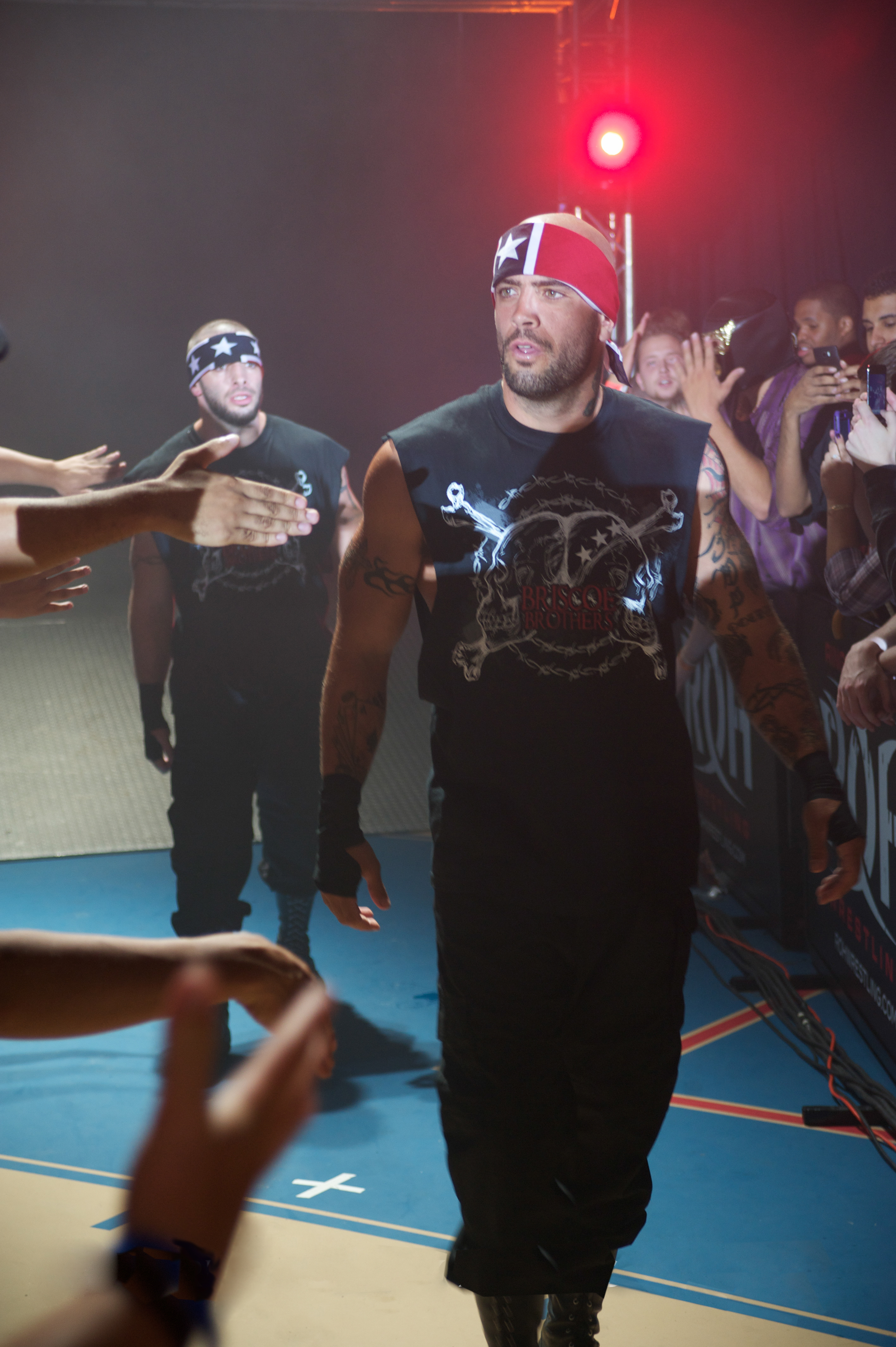
The Briscoe Brothers

Tag team/Stable(s)	Members	Tenure(s)
BLKOUT	BLK Jeez and Ruckus	2012
The Blue World Order	Big Stevie Cool, Da Blue Guy and Thomas "The Inchworm" Rodman	2012
The Briscoe Brothers	Jay Briscoe and Mark Briscoe	2012
El Dramaticos	Dramatic #1 and Dramatic #2	2012
Four Loco	Azrieal and Bandido Jr.	2012
The F.B.I.	Little Guido and Tony Mamaluke	2012
The Gangstas	New Jack and Mustafa Saed	2012
Da Lost Boys	Lost Boy #1 and Lost Boy #2	2012
Rough & Wild	Matt Lancie and Blake Wilder	2012
Rush Hour	Bu Ku Dao and Bolt Bradley	2012
The Slophunters	Alex Reynolds and John Silver	2012
Team Blue Balls	The Blue Meanie and Balls Mahoney	2012

=== Managers and valets ===
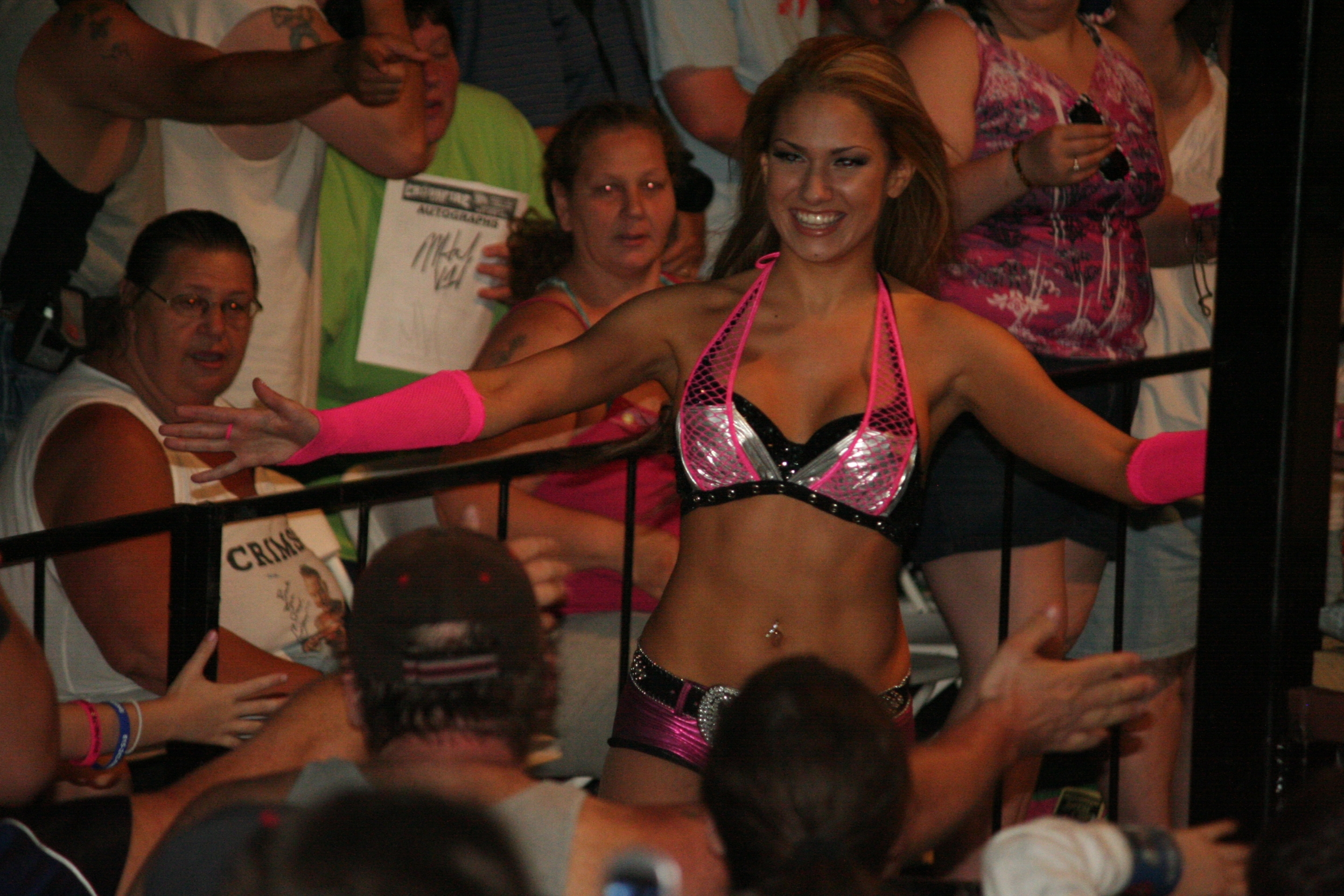
Reby Sky

Birth name:	Ring name(s):	Tenure:	Notes
Rebecca Reyes	Reby Sky	2012	
Sylvester Terkay	Sylvester Terkay	2012	
Unknown	Christina Vicious	2012	
Unknown	Thomas "The Inchworm" Rodman	2012	

=== Commentators and interviewers ===
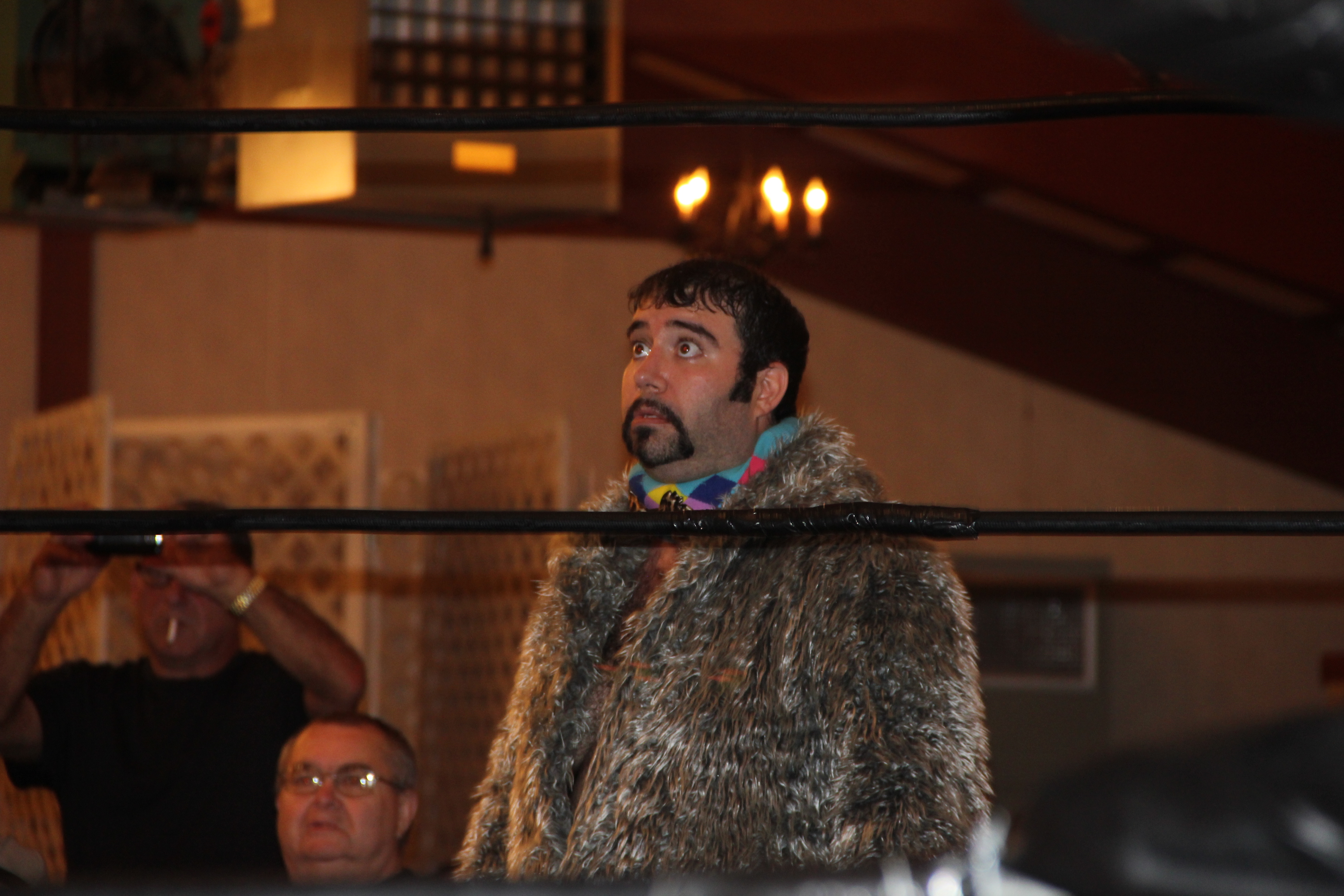
Joel Gertner

Birth name:	Ring name(s):	Tenure:	Notes
Joel Gertner	Joel Gertner	2012	
Rob Ziccardi	Robby Mireno	2012	

=== Other personnel ===
Birth name:	Ring name(s):	Tenure:	Notes
Kevin Consolo	Kevin Consolo	2012–2013	Promoter
Mark Keenan	Cody Michaels	2012–2013	Promoter
Kevin Klienrock	Kevin Klienrock	2012–2013	Promoter
Troy Martin	Shane Douglas	2012	Promoter
Steve O'Neill	Steve O'Neill	2012–2014	Promoter

Company name to Year
Company name:	Years:
Extreme Reunion	2012
Extreme Rising	2012–2014
Notes
^{†} Indicates they are deceased.
^{‡} Indicates they died while they were employed with Extreme Rising.
