= Mamalukes =

Professional wrestling tag team

Tag team
- Members: Big Vito; Johnny the Bull; Tony Marinara
- Name(s): The Mamalukes; Big Vito and Johnny the Bull
- Billed heights: Vito: 6 ft 2 in (1.88 m); Johnny: 6 ft 0 in (1.83 m)
- Combined billed weight: 495 lb (225 kg)
- Billed from: Little Italy, Manhattan, New York
- Former member: Disco Inferno (manager)
- Debut: 1999
- Disbanded: 2001

The Mamalukes were a professional wrestling tag team in World Championship Wrestling.

== History ==
The Mamalukes were formed in late 1999 when Big Vito arrived in WCW and established a team with Johnny the Bull. They were managed by Tony Marinara. The gimmick was a takeoff of Italian Americans in the Mafia which they played up heavily.

In late 1999, Disco Inferno began entering the ring with Marinara at his side. At WCW Mayhem, however, Inferno accidentally knocked his manager unconscious with a chair, causing his own distraction and loss of the WCW Cruiserweight Championship to Evan Karagias. Marinara then left Inferno and joined the newly introduced Mamalukes. A war ensued between them with Inferno surprisingly backed by former adversary Lash LeRoux. The two Cruiserweights frequently pulled pranks on their three enemies such as tarring and feathering Marinara.

The rival teams were pitted against one another at Starrcade 1999. During the match, Inferno again attacked his partner accidentally, allowing the Mamalukes to pick up the victory. This led to Inferno becoming the Mamalukes' enforcer as a means of paying off his debt and earn their forgiveness. This forced Inferno to turn on LeRoux. He also became the Mamalukes' manager when Marinara left and set them up with twins, Lolli and Pop in a failed attempt to distract them while he escaped. In early 2000, the Mamalukes feuded with David Flair and Crowbar and won their WCW World Tag Team Championship. They also had a substantial feud with the Harris Brothers who defeated them for the titles on two occasions and lost on one. The Mamalukes' final Tag Team title loss came at Uncensored 2000.

In April, the Mamalukes joined the New Blood faction with Disco Inferno at their side; however, after continually doing their dirty work, he left for The Filthy Animals. The Mamalukes benefited from their association with the New Blood when Eric Bischoff won the WCW Hardcore Championship. Bischoff did not want this title and gave it to them jointly on June 7. The Mamalukes were then forced into a match on June 19 to decide a single Hardcore Champion. Vito won, and the two split soon afterwards.

When Johnny the Bull returned from an injury in September, 2000, he betrayed Vito and joined Vito's rival faction, The Natural Born Thrillers. Eventually the Mamalukes reunited in December 2000, They teamed together until March 2001, when the World Wrestling Federation bought out WCW.

Although the Mamalukes never got the chance to reunite again in another company, both men would later become part of different incarnations of The Full Blooded Italians on World Wrestling Entertainment's SmackDown! brand. They each teamed with Nunzio who, in both the original and WWE version of Extreme Championship Wrestling, teamed as part of the F.B.I. with their former manager Marinara. Marinara later adopted the name Tony Mamaluke as a reference to the WCW tag team.

== Championships and accomplishments ==
- World Championship Wrestling

- WCW Hardcore Championship (1 time)
- WCW World Tag Team Championship (2 times)

== See also ==
- The Full Blooded Italians
- The Natural Born Thrillers
- The New Blood
- Salvatore Sincere
