= Hardcore Justice (2010) =

2010 Total Nonstop Action Wrestling pay-per-view event

- Promotional poster featuring ECW alumni from left to right: Rhino, Tommy Dreamer, Mick Foley, Stevie Richards and Raven
- Promotion: Total Nonstop Action Wrestling
- Date: August 8, 2010
- City: Orlando, Florida
- Venue: Impact Zone
- Attendance: 1,100
- Tagline: The Last Stand

Pay-per-view chronology
← Previous; Victory Road	Next → No Surrender

Hardcore Justice chronology
← Previous; 2009	Next → 2011

The 2010 Hardcore Justice (stylized HardCORE Justice, and occasionally referred to as Hardcore Justice: The Last Stand) was a professional wrestling pay-per-view event produced by Total Nonstop Action Wrestling (TNA), which took place on August 8, 2010 at the Impact Zone in Orlando, Florida. It was the sixth event under the Hard Justice chronology and the eighth event of the 2010 TNA pay-per-view schedule.

In October 2017, with the launch of the Global Wrestling Network, the event became available to stream on demand.

== Storylines ==
Other on-screen personnel
Role:	Name:
Commentator	Mike Tenay
Commentator	Taz
Interviewer	Jeremy Borash
Interviewer	Lauren Thompson
Ring announcer	Jeremy Borash
Referee	Andrew Thomas
Referee	Brian Hebner
Referee	Earl Hebner
Referee	Frank Gastineau
Referee	Mickie James

Hardcore Justice featured seven professional wrestling matches that involved different wrestlers from pre-existing scripted feuds and storylines. Wrestlers portrayed villains, heroes, or less distinguishable characters in the scripted events that built tension and culminated in a wrestling match or series of matches.

This year, TNA changed the event's name from Hard Justice to Hardcore Justice in honor of the Extreme Championship Wrestling reunion show theme that it adopted. The show was originally going to be main evented by a match between Rob Van Dam and Jerry Lynn. However, the match had to be cancelled when Lynn pulled out due to a back injury. The replacement main event was Rob Van Dam vs. Sabu.

== Event ==
In addition to matches, Hardcore Justice featured TNA stars such as A.J. Styles, Matt Morgan, Jesse Neal, and Madison Rayne sharing their memories of ECW, and dedications to Joey Styles, Paul Heyman, and all the ECW alumni who had died since working for the promotion. Tod Gordon, "Pitbull" Gary Wolfe, The Blue Meanie, and Francine appeared in pre-taped segments.

During the show, two substitutes appeared for ECW alumni: Big Tilly appeared as "Blue Tilly" as part of Stevie Richards' BW2.0 (the name being a play on the EV2.0 stable). Meanwhile, Samuel Shaw portrayed Lupus, a minor member of Raven's Nest.

After losing to Richards, P.J. Polaco attacked Richards with a Singapore Cane, until the Sandman came out to attack him in turn.

Following their victory over Rotten and Kahoneys, Team 3D declared themselves the most extreme tag team in wrestling, after which The Gangstas confronted them. Following the confrontation, all six men celebrated together in the ring.

== Results ==
No.	Results	Stipulations	Times
1	The F.B.I. (Guido Maritato, Tony Luke and Tracy Smothers) (with Sal E. Graziano) defeated Kid Kash, Johnny Swinger and Simon Diamond	Six-man tag team match	10:45
2	Too Cold Scorpio defeated C. W. Anderson	Singles match	06:48
3	Stevie Richards (with Blue Tilly and Hollywood Nova) defeated P.J. Polaco	Singles match	06:33
4	Rhino defeated Al Snow and Brother Runt	Three-Way Dance	06:01
5	Team 3D (Brother Devon and Brother Ray) (with Joel Gertner) defeated Axl Rotten and Kahoneys	South Philadelphia Street Fight	11:54
6	Raven defeated Tommy Dreamer	Singles with Mick Foley as special guest referee	16:59
7	Rob Van Dam defeated Sabu	Hardcore match	17:15

=== The Whole F'n Show ===
The Whole F'n Show
- Promotion: Total Nonstop Action Wrestling
- Date: August 9, 2010 (aired August 12, 2010)
- City: Orlando, Florida
- Venue: Impact Zone
- Tagline: LIVE and FREE on Spike TV

Impact! special episodes chronology
← Previous; Monday Night Impact	Next → Before the Glory

The Whole F'n Show was the original card which was supposed to take place at Hardcore Justice four days earlier, but the show was given to the ECW Originals. This event was held as a special pay-per-view quality show on TNA Impact.

No.	Results	Stipulations	Times
1^{D}	Jesse Neal defeated Sam Shaw	Singles match	04:49
2	Kurt Angle defeated A.J. Styles	Career Threatening match	08:20
3	Angelina Love defeated Madison Rayne (c)	Singles match for the TNA Women's Knockout Championship	03:44
4	Matt Morgan defeated D'Angelo Dinero and Mr. Anderson	Triple threat match	04:00
5	Jeff Hardy defeated Shannon Moore	Singles match	06:46
6	The Motor City Machine Guns (Alex Shelley and Chris Sabin) (c) defeated Beer Money, Inc. (James Storm and Robert Roode)	Two-out-of-three falls match for the TNA World Tag Team Championship	16:20
7	Rob Van Dam (c) defeated Abyss	Ladder match for the TNA World Heavyweight Championship with Eric Bischoff as special guest referee	17:15
(c) / – the champion(s) heading into the match; D / – this was a dark match

== See also ==
- ECW One Night Stand (2005)
- ECW One Night Stand (2006)
- Hardcore Homecoming
