= Vito LoGrasso =

American professional wrestler (born 1964)

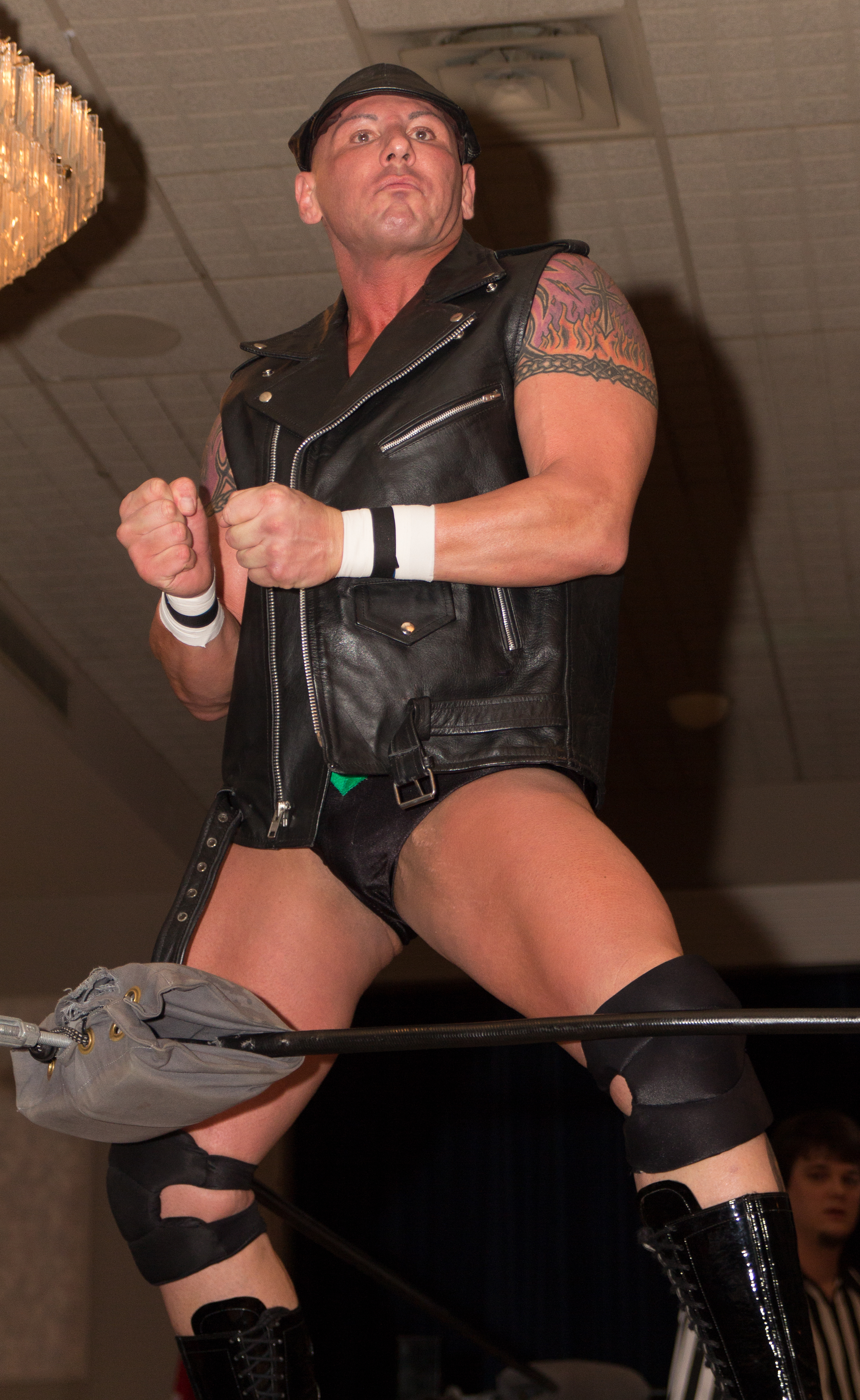
- Lo Grasso, aka Big Vito, making his entrance at a show in 2013

Personal information
- Born: Vito Joseph LoGrasso; June 18, 1964 (age 62) Brooklyn, New York, U.S.
- Spouse: Noel Harlow (m. 2014)

Professional wrestling career
- Ring name(s): Vito Cruz; Big Vito; Santa Claus; Skull Von Krush; Von Krus; Vito Krus; Vito LoGrasso; Vito
- Billed height: 6 ft 2 in (188 cm)
- Billed weight: 250 lb (113 kg)
- Billed from: Little Italy, Manhattan, New York; Staten Island, New York; Germany (as Von Krus)
- Trained by: Johnny Rodz
- Debut: 1990

Vito Joseph LoGrasso (born June 18, 1964) better known by the ring name Big Vito, is an American professional wrestler. He is best known for his work in World Championship Wrestling (WCW), Extreme Championship Wrestling, and World Wrestling Entertainment (WWE) as simply Vito. and has been working on the independent circuit, primarily with Juggalo Championship Wrestling (JCW).

== Professional wrestling career ==
=== Early Career (1990–1998) ===
LoGrasso started wrestling in 1990 on the independent circuit until being approached by NOW Wrestling Federation, based in Japan. Vito then went on to work in the USWA and WWC using the name Skull Von Krush. LoGrasso also travelled to Japan on other occasions after his NOW run. Firstly to All Japan Pro-Wrestling, where he holds a rare pinfall elimination over Mitsuharu Misawa in the New Year Giant Series battle royal of 1998, after hitting a Stunner on the Triple Crown Champion which led to his elimination.

=== World Wrestling Federation (1991–1993) ===
He returned to the states in 1991 and became enhancement talent in the WWF. He wrestled on early editions of WWF Monday Night Raw as Von Krus, a German wrestler with an "evil foreigner" gimmick.

=== United States Wrestling Association (1994) ===
1994 Vito debuted in USWA as Skull Von Krush managed by Lee Womack. He feuded with Brian Christopher, Spell Binder, and Jeff Gaylord. On March 7, 1994, Memphis Memories show. Vito, as Skull Von Krush, teamed with Danny Davis & Ken Wayne in a six-man tag match at a USWA show in Memphis to defeat the team of Jeff Gaylord, King Cobra & Spellbinder. He also later attacked Jerry Lawler.

=== Extreme Championship Wrestling (1998–1999) ===
After a lot of success in those promotions, Vito met up with extreme wrestler Taz at Johnny Rodz training school, who was able to get him a try out in ECW. When he started in ECW, he was still using the name Skull Von Krush. He later changed his name to Vito "The Skull" LoGrasso and became a member of "Da Baldies" stable, who in the storyline, claimed to be an offshoot of a real life New York street gang, and as such took issue with New Jack calling himself a "Gangsta" and began a feud with him. Vito worked a couple of shows with the now defunct LIWF with Billy Alaimo and was on the Junkyard Dog memorial show in a casket match at the Elks Lodge in Queens, New York.

On the November 19, 1999 edition of ECW Wrestling on TNN, LoGrasso was pinned in a tag team match where the loser of the fall was forced to leave the company as he was already signed to WCW.

=== World Championship Wrestling (1999–2001) ===
In 1999 Vito left ECW for World Championship Wrestling (WCW) where he teamed with Johnny the Bull as The Mamalukes. Managed by Tony Marinara The Mamalukes captured the WCW World Tag Team Championship twice, and were, in storyline, jointly awarded the WCW Hardcore Championship. After being awarded the championship, however, Vito and Johnny were forced to face each other in a match to crown one champion, which Vito won.

In WCW, Vito was billed from Staten Island, New York, which is where he actually grew up.

In December 2000, the Mamalukes reunited and teamed together until March 2001, when WCW was acquired by the WWF. After the acquisition, Vito was one of the wrestlers who was lost in the shuffle, neither becoming a part of The Invasion nor taking one of the large ticket buyouts offered. He returned to the independents.

=== Independent circuit (2001–2004) ===
After the end of WCW, Vito wrestled in the independents. As Big Vito, he teamed with "Mr. Puroresu" Genichiro Tenryu twice while wrestling for Riki Choshu's Fighting World Of Japan Pro-Wrestling in April 2003.

=== Total Nonstop Action Wrestling (2004) ===
Vito also had a brief run in Total Nonstop Action Wrestling in late-2004 with Glenn Gilbertti, Trinity and Johnny Swinger as the "New York Connection". His only feud was with "Irish" Pat Kenney, in which they exchanged victories.

=== Return to WWE (2005–2007) ===
==== The Full Blooded Italians and singles competition (2005–2007) ====
In early 2005, Vito worked in various dark matches with Val Venis before signing a contract with WWE in June.

On the August 6, 2005 episode of Velocity, Vito made his WWE debut, where he helped Nunzio win the WWE Cruiserweight Championship from Paul London. Vito and Nunzio would then reform as The Full Blooded Italians, wrestling in various tag team matches. After a brief feud with Gregory Helms, in March 2006, Vito and Nunzio would turn heel, after Vito announced he wanted to be recognized as a "Godfather".

Beginning in May, wrestlers such as Orlando Jordan and Paul Burchill would approach Nunzio, spreading rumours that they had seen Vito in public places in various forms of cross-dress. On the June 2, 2006, episode of SmackDown!, after Nunzio was defeated by Matt Hardy, Vito, wearing a dress, came out to help Nunzio backstage. The following week on SmackDown!, after arguing about Vito's clothing choices, the two had a match against each other, where Vito defeated Nunzio. Shortly after, Nunzio joined the ECW brand, leaving Vito on SmackDown!, officially disbanding the team.

Despite him cross dressing, Vito would continue to explain that he was a straight man; as on the June 23 episode of SmackDown!, Vito asked Ashley Massaro out on a date, which she agreed to. Vito would then begin to "have more fun" during his matches, running around and waving his dresses and otherwise interacting with the fans, turning him once again face. During this time, Montel Vontavious Porter and William Regal, as well as SmackDown! color commentator John "Bradshaw" Layfield, began to voice their problems with a man wrestling in a dress. Both MVP and Regal threatened SmackDown! General Manager Theodore Long with a sexual harassment lawsuit to get out of a match with Vito. At the same time, WWE began to "censor" any incidents of Vito's dress raising and exposing his (bethonged) buttocks. Vito then began an undefeated streak, which would last over four months until the October 20 episode of SmackDown!, when Vito was defeated by Elijah Burke after interference from his partner Sylvester Terkay. On the November 3 episode of SmackDown!, Vito teamed with Layla in a losing effort against The Miz and Kristal.

On May 15, 2007, Vito was released from his WWE contract.

==== Deep South Wrestling and Ohio Valley Wrestling (2007) ====
On January 25, 2007, Vito won the Deep South Heavyweight Championship after defeating former champion Bradley Jay and Ryan O'Reilly in a three-way round robin match. After his title win, Vito underwent a gimmick change into a martial arts character, as he began wearing kickboxing-style trunks, a hachimaki headband, and wrestling without shoes, with Vito later explaining that his opponents were complaining he only won matches because him wearing a dress distracted them. Vito would briefly return in his new gimmick when he appeared as a lumberjack on the episode of WWE Heat before WrestleMania 23, in a tag team match between Carlito and Ric Flair against Chavo Guerrero and Gregory Helms. On February 22, Vito re-lost the title to Jay.

He also wrestled matches for Ohio Valley Wrestling in 2007.

=== Return to the independent circuit (2007–2015) ===
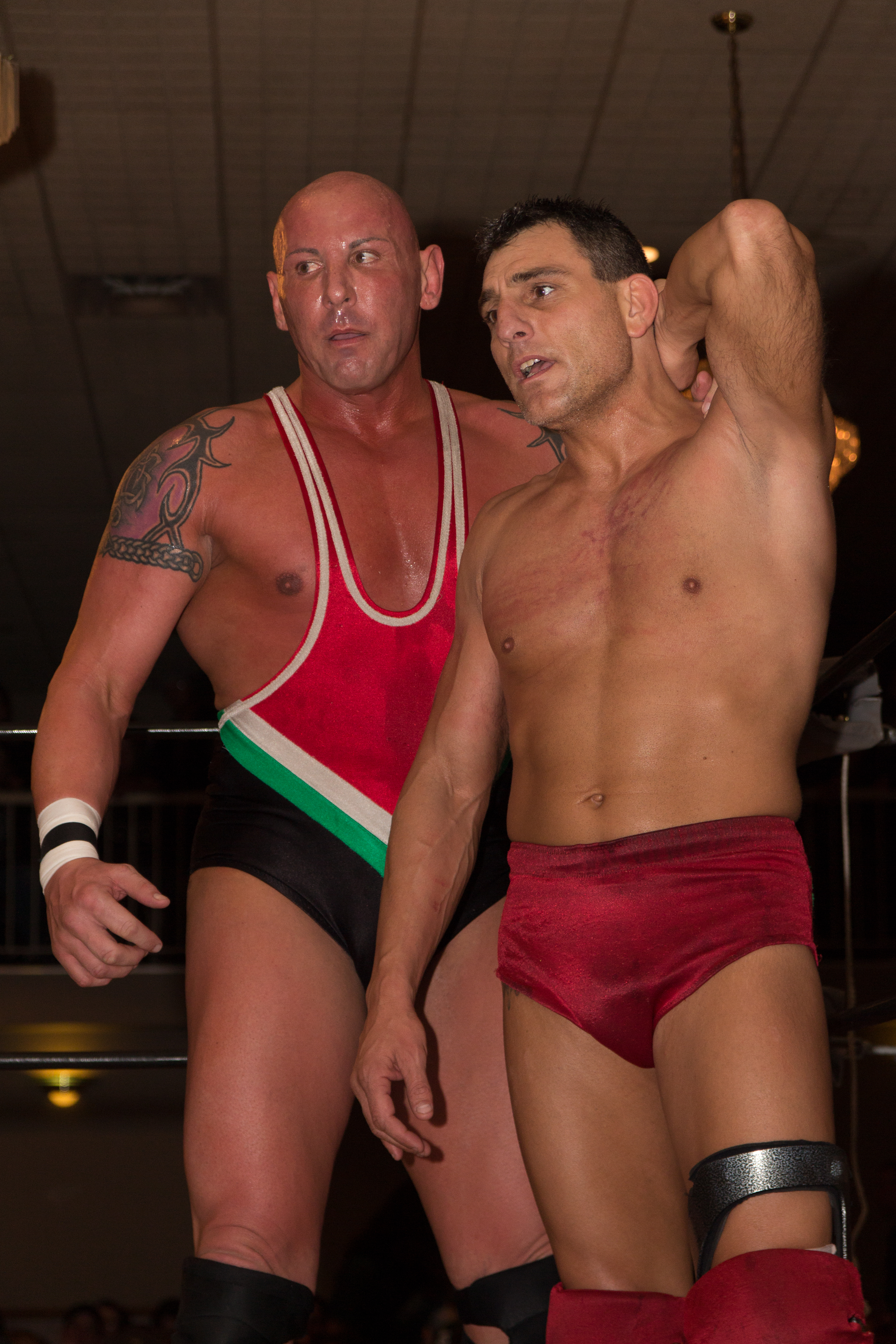
Vito (left) and James Maritato in 2013.

Vito continued to travel the world; performing in the UK, France, Italy, Malta, Nepal, and Canada, as well as wrestling in the US for ISPW, ACPW, ACW, PWX, DTW, and Wrestling for a Cause in 2009, 2010, and 2011.

He has also wrestled on various tours of Europe with Irish Whip Wrestling.

February 24, 2011, He returned to defeat the Himalayan Tiger in Kathmandu, Nepal for the Golden Cine Professional Wrestling Show held at the Dasharath Stadium in front of 20,000 people, to become the first ever Profession Wrestling Champion of Nepal. On March 1, 2011, Vito presence was requested by the US Embassy of Nepal. He was greeted and congratulated by the councilor of public affairs of US embassy to Nepal, Terry J. White and staff.

March 2, 2013 Vito made an appearance in Canada for the ECW Hardcore Roadtrip teaming with Nunzio against Pitbull Gary Wolfe and Balls. He also faced Al Snow earlier on the card as Skull Von Krush.

August 2013 Vito opened a wrestling school in Clearwater, Fl and launched a website BigVito.com

On September 19, 2013, Vito appeared in Ring Warriors as the leader of the stable The Slambinos.

On September 18, 2013, LoGrasso's wrestling school announced a partnership with Dragon Gate USA wrestling as a farm system. In mid-2014, Vito retired from in-ring competition. Vito again appeared with the Ring Warriors in April 2015 as the manager of the Slambinos.

Vito returned to the ring in 2021-22 after taking care of his wife after a long illness.

=== Juggalo Championship Wrestling (2025–present) ===
On the November 7, 2025 episode of JCW Lunacy, Vito made his Juggalo Championship Wrestling debut after arriving in a limousine to the venue as an investor in the promotion. At the end of the episode, he would reveal himself and would fire a wrestler named CoKane after a confrontation with commissioner and JCW owner Violent J. On the following episode, he would force Steven Flowe and CoKane to fight each other in the main event. After the match, the St. Claire Monster Corporation (Kongo Kong and Mr. Happy) led by Jasmin St. Claire would attack both of the wrestlers. On the November 28, 2025 episode of Lunacy, Vito threatened Steven Flowe to bring CoKane to him otherwise he would punish them both. Flowe refused and Vito would attack him before Vince Russo stormed out to the ring to stop Vito.

== Acting career ==
Lograsso had a minor role as Bodo in the science fiction film The Survivor. He had a leading role in the 2014 horror thriller film The Church, alongside Clint Howard, Bill Moseley, Lisa Wilcox and Ashley C. Williams. He appears in the role of Ricardo Lewis in the action thriller film Apnea, who works beside his acting as Stunt coordinator.

== Personal life ==
Vito married former wrestling personality and model Noel Harlow LoGrasso on September 27, 2014. They previously worked together in the US, where she was billed as "Lil Noel" as a play on his "Big Vito" name.

Lograsso began podcasting with Vince Russo's "The Brand" on the RELM Network in July 2017. He opened up his own podcast series with his wife Noel and Russo in August 2017.

Lograsso (alongside former WWE NXT wrestler Adam Mercer) filed a concussion lawsuit against WWE in January 2015, claiming "serious neurological damage, including severe headaches, memory loss, depression and anxiety, as well as deafness" as a result of their WWE run. The suit was litigated by attorney Konstantine Kyros, who also represented wrestler Billy Jack Haynes in a similar lawsuit and went on to represent dozens of other wrestlers. The lawsuit was dismissed in April 2018 by District of Connecticut judge Vanessa Lynne Bryant.

== Championships and accomplishments ==
- Atomic Championship Wrestling
  - ACW Heavyweight Championship (1 time)
  - ACW Tristate Championship (1 time)
- American Championship Pro Wrestling
  - ACPW Heavyweight Championship (1 time)
- Big Time Wrestling
  - BTW Heavyweight Championship (1 time)
- Deep South Wrestling
  - Deep South Heavyweight Championship (1 time)
- World Wrestling Council
  - WWC World Tag Team Championship (1 time) - with Killer
- European Wrestling Promotion
  - Ironman Hardcore Knockout Tournament (2002)
- Golden Cine Professional Wrestling
  - Pro Wrestling Heavyweight Championship of Nepal (1 time)
- International Wrestling Association
  - IWA Intercontinental Heavyweight Championship (1 time)
- Midwest Championship Wrestling Alliance
  - MCWA Tag Team Championship (1 time) - with Helmut Hessler
- Pro Wrestling Illustrated
  - Ranked No. 91 of the top 500 singles wrestlers in the PWI 500 in 2000
- Pro Wrestling Xtreme
  - PWX World Tag Team Championship (1 time) - with Francisco Ciatso
- United States Extreme Wrestling
  - UXW United States Championship (1 time)
- World Championship Wrestling
  - WCW Hardcore Championship (2 times) – won jointly with Johnny the Bull
  - WCW World Tag Team Championship (2 times) – with Johnny the Bull
