= Big Guido =

American professional wrestler

Personal information
- Born: Michael Iorio; April 20, 1964 (age 62) Brentwood, New York, U.S.

Professional wrestling career
- Ring name(s): Big Guido; Michael Fury; Mike Fury; Mike Iorio; Primo Carnera; Primo Carnera III
- Billed height: 6 ft 9 in (206 cm)
- Billed weight: 350 lb (159 kg)
- Debut: 1984
- Retired: June 2006

Michael Iorio (born April 20, 1964) is an American former professional wrestler best known under the ring name of Big Guido. Iorio wrestled as an enforcer for The Full Blooded Italians in Extreme Championship Wrestling in the late 1990s. He was also a part of the team's reunion in World Wrestling Entertainment in 2005 and 2006. In addition, he has worked for Puerto Rico's International Wrestling Association and Empire State Wrestling.

== Professional wrestling career ==
=== World Wrestling Federation ===
In 1991 and 1992, Iorio made a few appearances for the World Wrestling Federation as a jobber under the ring name Mike Fury. He lost to such stars as The British Bulldog, The Warlord, Tito Santana and Bret Hart.

=== Full Blooded Italians ===
Michael Iorio first joined the Full Blooded Italians in the original ECW at Heatwave 1996, introduced as Little Guido's "little" brother, Big Guido. He accompanied the stable members to the ring, and sporadically fought actual matches.

=== International Wrestling Association ===
In 2002, Iorio, under the ring name Primo Carnera won the International Wrestling Association's World Heavyweight Championship after the title was previously held up. He gave the title the same day to Savio Vega. In the following two months, he held the title two more times.

=== World Wrestling Entertainment ===
Iorio reappeared on World Wrestling Entertainment's ECW brand's One Night Stand on June 12, 2005 accompanying the Full Blooded Italians to the ring. Big Guido then reappeared on ECW on June 11, 2006 during ECW One Night Stand alongside Tony Mamaluke and Little Guido. On the June 13 edition of ECW, Big Guido took part in the hardcore battle royal and was eliminated by Big Show, but helped Sabu eliminate Big Show. Afterwards, Iorio retired from wrestling.

== Championships and accomplishments ==
- International Wrestling Association
  - IWA World Heavyweight Championship (3 times)
- Eastern States Wrestling / Eastern Shores Wrestling
  - ESW Heavyweight Championship (1 time)
- Empire State Wrestling
  - ESW Heavyweight Championship (3 times)
- New Breed Wrestling
  - NBW Tag Team Championship (1 time) – with Tony DeVito
