= ECW One Night Stand (2005) =

World Wrestling Entertainment pay-per-view event

- Promotional poster
- Promotion: World Wrestling Entertainment
- Brand: Extreme Championship Wrestling
- Date: June 12, 2005
- City: New York City, New York
- Venue: Hammerstein Ballroom
- Attendance: 2,500
- Buy rate: 325,000

Pay-per-view chronology
← Previous; Judgment Day	Next → Vengeance

One Night Stand chronology
← Previous; First	Next → 2006

The 2005 ECW One Night Stand, also promoted as ECW One Night Stand: New York, was a professional wrestling pay-per-view (PPV) event produced by World Wrestling Entertainment (WWE). It was the inaugural One Night Stand and took place on June 12, 2005, at the Hammerstein Ballroom in the Manhattan borough of New York City, New York. Although wrestlers from WWE's Raw and SmackDown! brands appeared on the show, the event was primarily produced as a reunion show for wrestlers from the former Extreme Championship Wrestling (ECW) promotion, which had folded in 2001, after which, WWE acquired its assets in 2003. The event featured hardcore-based matches, which is what ECW was known for.

The main event was a tag team match between The Dudley Boyz (Bubba Ray and D-Von) and the team of Tommy Dreamer and The Sandman. Two of the matches on the undercard were Chris Benoit versus Eddie Guerrero and Mike Awesome versus Masato Tanaka.

== Production ==
=== Background ===
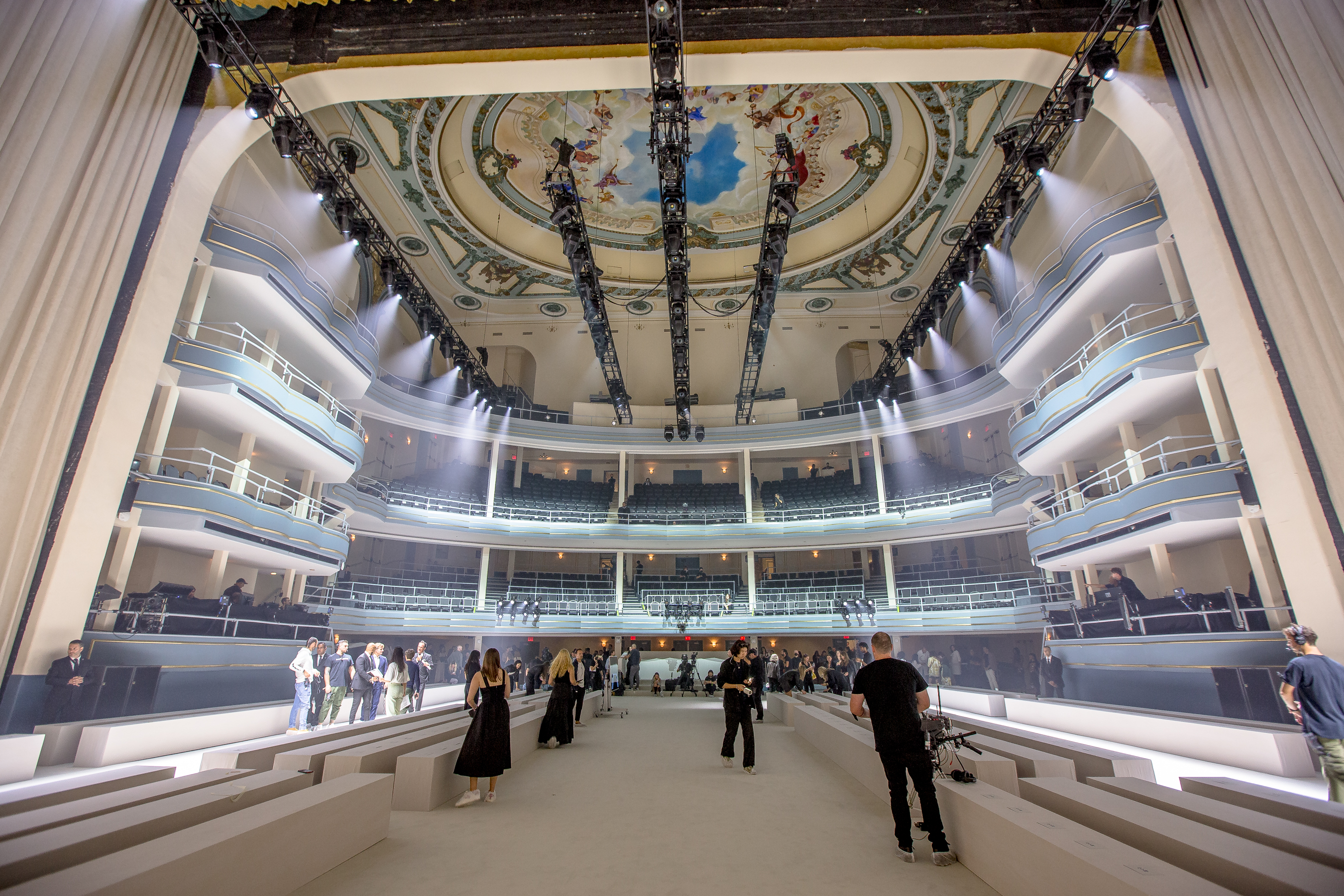
The event was held at the Hammerstein Ballroom in the Manhattan borough of New York City, New York.

In 2001, the professional wrestling promotion Extreme Championship Wrestling (ECW) was closed down due to financial issues, and World Wrestling Entertainment (WWE) acquired its assets in 2003. With the overwhelming success of The Rise and Fall of ECW (2004) documentary, WWE announced that they would be holding an ECW reunion show as a pay-per-view (PPV) event on June 12, 2005, at the Hammerstein Ballroom in the Manhattan borough of New York City, New York, titled ECW One Night Stand. Although the build-up for the show began in the middle of May, plans were in the works behind the scenes for several months in advance. Tommy Dreamer was in charge of organizing the hardcore-based event and getting ECW alumni to participate, who were referred to as "ECW Originals" in the build to the show. He contacted several people, including The Sandman, Sabu, Justin Credible, and ECW commentator Joey Styles. Reports later stated that Paul Heyman was working with Dreamer to help prepare the event. Other ECW related wrestlers were later added to the show. The event was publicly confirmed by WWE through a Dish Network magazine in March 2005. In an interview with SLAM! Sports days before One Night Stand, ECW original Rob Van Dam announced he had asked Vince McMahon about the idea of holding an ECW reunion event.

=== Storylines ===
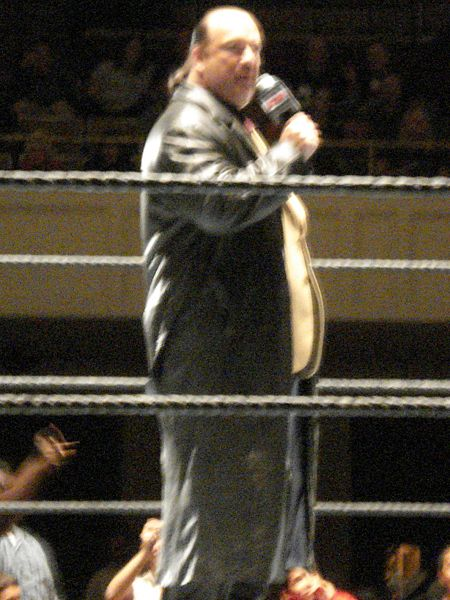
Paul Heyman, the former owner of Extreme Championship Wrestling (ECW).

Although many of the individual matches on the One Night Stand card were announced weeks before the event occurred, none of them got any build-up on any of WWE's weekly programs, with WWE instead choosing to focus on an "invasion" angle, with several Raw and SmackDown! superstars feuding against wrestlers from the original ECW.

The invasion angle began on the May 9 episode of Raw, when Raw General Manager Eric Bischoff made a statement regarding the pay-per-view, saying that he'd "squash ECW like a bug." The next week on Raw, Tajiri agreed to an ECW Rules match with Chris Benoit. In the middle of the match, however, Bischoff came out to stop it, and announced anything related to ECW was banned from Raw. He also vowed to "destroy" ECW with the help of the Raw superstars chosen to compete at the pay-per-view. Bischoff planned an ECW funeral for the next week's Raw, but WWE Chairman Vince McMahon interrupted and spoke of his support for the ECW reunion and his financial interest in bringing back the promotion. Paul Heyman then came out and reminded McMahon that, while Heyman did not own ECW, he still had control of it. Heyman also said that he welcomed Bischoff's invasion, claiming, "You may light a fire that you can’t put out." and proceeded to light the funeral wreath ablaze. In a rematch from the last week's Raw, Benoit defeated Tajiri in an ECW Rules match after locking in the Crippler Crossface. The next week, Bischoff set up a Tables match between Edge and Benoit. During the match, Benoit attempted a diving headbutt with Edge on a table, but failed after Lita moved Edge off it. At that point, Bischoff sent several Raw superstars to the ring to assault Benoit, with Gene Snitsky booting Benoit in the face, and Edge powerbombing Benoit through the table for the victory.

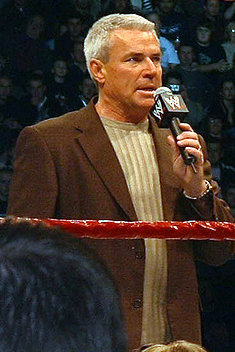
Eric Bischoff, the leader of Raw's invasion, and, at the time, Raw's general manager.

The feud between the Raw superstars and ECW Originals also spread over to SmackDown!. On the May 26 episode of SmackDown!, Kurt Angle stated that ECW was a low-class promotion, and that he would be part of WWE's invasion of One Night Stand, taking SmackDown! volunteers with him. A week later, Angle asked Tazz to join him in the invasion and on the same episode of SmackDown!, John "Bradshaw" Layfield (JBL) announced he would be joining Angle in invading the pay-per-view. When Tazz rejected the offer, Angle reacted by assaulting Tazz and leaving him bleeding in the ring.

On the June 6 episode of Raw, Benoit defeated Snitsky in an ECW Rules match by performing a diving headbutt and pinning him. The ECW Originals made their debut on WWE programming, as Tommy Dreamer, Rhyno, Balls Mahoney, Axl Rotten, The Sandman, and other ECW Originals attacked Bischoff's Raw invaders, with ECW Originals, The Dudley Boyz, hitting a 3D on Raw invader Maven. Benoit was drafted to SmackDown! on its June 9, 2005, episode, and faced JBL in the main event with the ECW Originals at ringside cheering him on. JBL's Cabinet was also at ringside, as well as Carlito, Matt Morgan and Kurt Angle. After Benoit locked in the Crossface on JBL, Angle interfered and broke the submission hold, resulting in a disqualification and a brawl breaking out between the ECW Originals and WWE Invaders, with ECW coming out on top.

== Event ==
Other on-screen personnel
Role:	Name:
Commentators	Joey Styles
Commentators	Mick Foley
Spanish commentators	Carlos Cabrera
Spanish commentators	Hugo Savinovich
Interviewer	Joel Gertner
Ring announcers	Stephen DeAngelis
Ring announcers	Bob Artese
Referees	John Finnegan
Referees	Jim Molineaux
Referees	John "Pee Wee" Moore
Referees	Mike Kehner

Before the event aired live on pay-per-view, an episode of Extreme Heat aired on Spike TV, showing footage from the build-up to the event. The event started with a speech from ECW commentator Joey Styles, who was greeted with an "ECW" chant. Styles welcomed the fans to One Night Stand before introducing the color commentator for the evening, Mick Foley.

The first match of the event was Lance Storm versus Chris Jericho. Storm was accompanied to the ring by Dawn Marie. During the match, a "Chris Candido" chant broke out, a reference to the recently deceased wrestler who was a tag team partner of Lance Storm in ECW. Jericho locked in the Walls of Jericho on Storm, but Marie jumped on the ring apron and distracted the referee. This allowed Storm's former Impact Players teammate, Justin Credible, along with Jason Knight, to interfere, with Credible hitting Jericho with a kendo stick. Storm got the pinfall on Jericho for the victory.

A tribute video played next, highlighting the wrestlers from ECW that had died between the promotion's end in 2001 and One Night Stand. A three-way dance was next, with Tajiri facing Little Guido Maritato and Super Crazy. Tajiri was accompanied to the ring by The Sinister Minister and Mikey Whipwreck, and Guido was accompanied by his fellow F.B.I. members. One of the highlights of the match occurred when Super Crazy delivered a moonsault off the balcony onto all the members of the F.B.I. Guido was the first eliminated when Whipwreck delivered a Whipper Snapper from the second rope while the referee was distracted. Tajiri picked up the three count to eliminate Guido. Super Crazy won the match after performing a moonsault off the top rope onto Tajiri, getting the three-count in the process.

Next was Psychosis facing SmackDown! superstar and ECW Original Rey Mysterio Jr. Mysterio won the match at the seven-minute mark after delivering a 619, followed by the West Coast Pop. The two later revealed that they were disappointed with the way their match panned out. After the contest, the SmackDown! crusaders entered the Hammerstein Ballroom. They consisted of Kurt Angle, John "Bradshaw" Layfield (JBL) and his Cabinet, Carlito and Matt Morgan. The crowd chanted, "You suck dick" and "Fuck you SmackDown!" as they entered the arena. Joel Gertner attempted to interview the invaders, but Angle took the microphone out of his hand and JBL pushed him to the ground. JBL and Angle cut a promo, with the crowd continuing to chant, "You suck dick", to which Angle replied with "Your MOTHER taught me how!". Angle stated, "The last time I was at an ECW event, I walked out halfway through because it sucked!" (referring to the High Incident show from 1996, where The Sandman was crucified by Raven). The crowd continued to chant, "Shut the fuck up", while JBL spoke.

Rob Van Dam and Bill Alfonso interrupted the promo, with Van Dam stating it had nothing to do with SmackDown!. Van Dam claimed that WWE deserved no credit, that the interview was a shoot with no scripts, and that missing One Night Stand was worse than missing WrestleMania. The promo was interrupted when Rhyno delivered a Gore. Van Dam's former tag team partner Sabu then appeared following the lights turning off, and had a match with Rhyno. Sabu won the match with Van Dam's help, as Van Dam delivered a Van Daminator on Rhyno before Sabu delivered the Arabian Skullcrusher on Rhyno through a table for the victory.

The Raw crusaders, which included Eric Bischoff, Jonathan Coachman, Edge, Christian, Tyson Tomko, Snitsky, La Résistance and William Regal, entered the building. Chris Benoit versus Eddie Guerrero followed, with Benoit making Guerrero submit to the Crippler Crossface. During this match, several anti-Lita chants could be heard, including "Lita's got herpes" and "I fucked Lita". After the Benoit/Guerrero match was over, Gertner again tried to interview the crusaders and begged Bischoff for a job. He was not successful, and Bischoff poured his drink over Gertner, saying, "ECW sucks!".

Mike Awesome versus Masato Tanaka followed, and Joey Styles made derogatory comments during the match about Awesome regarding Awesome's controversial departure from ECW in April 2000. At one point during the match, after Awesome delivered a suicide dive, Styles said, "And it's a shame he didn't succeed in taking his own life!". 20 months after the match, Awesome would commit suicide by hanging himself on February 17, 2007. Styles has since confirmed that this comment, as well as several other comments he made, were actually shoots. He said if the original ECW was ending, he was "going to say whatever the hell I wanted." The match was also notable for the large number of unprotected chair shots to the head that both men took, as well as several risky bumps. Awesome won the match after powerbombing Tanaka through a table on the outside of the ring and followed it with a suicide dive, getting the pinfall.

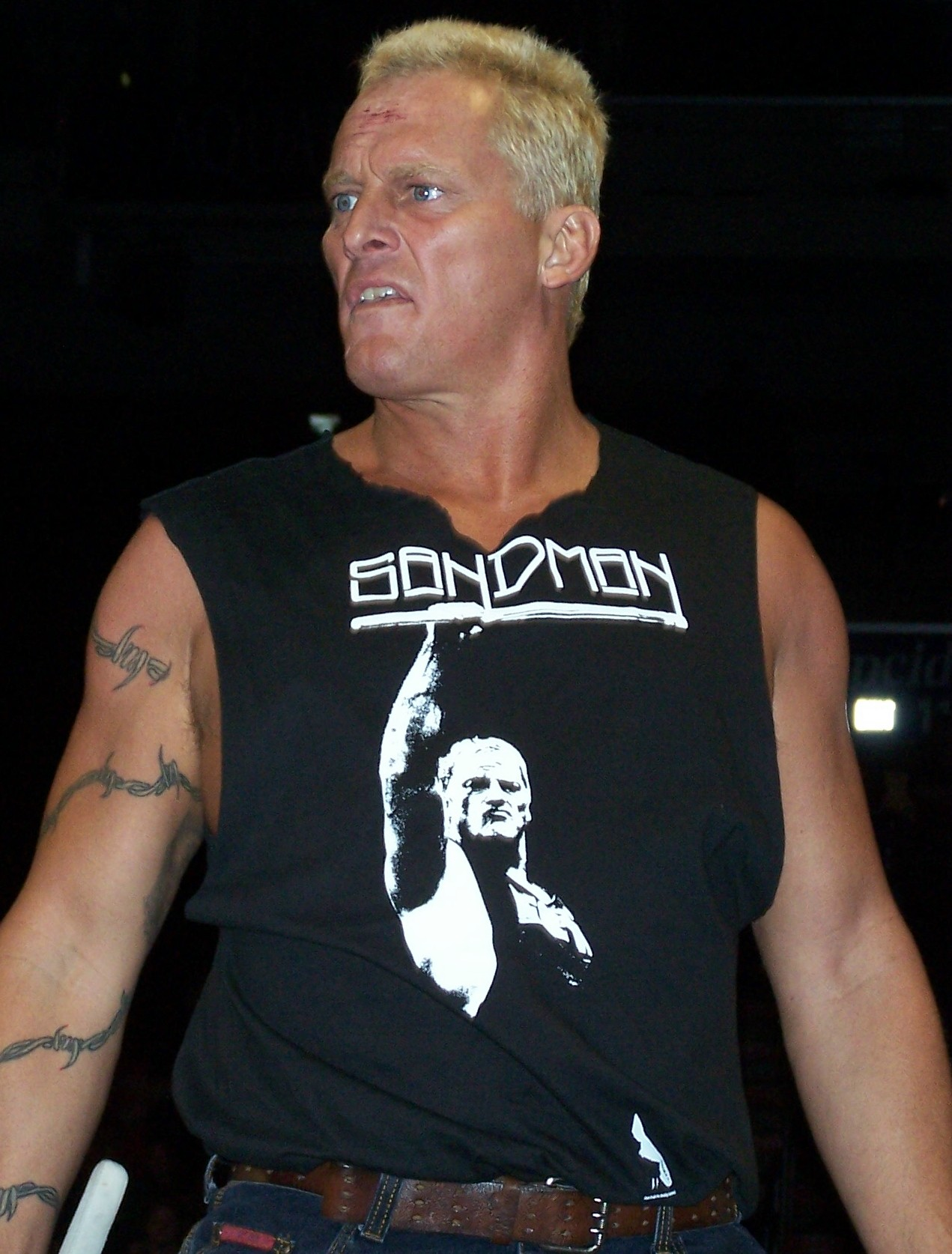
The Sandman, along with Tommy Dreamer, faced The Dudley Boyz at One Night Stand.

ECW booker Paul Heyman then cut a promo in the ring, with the crowd chanting, "Thank you Paul" and rising for a standing ovation. After thanking several people, including Tod Gordon, Heyman turned his attention to the Raw and SmackDown! invaders. He first spoke to Eric Bischoff, stating that Bischoff was in "our (ECW's) house". Heyman turned to Edge and said, "Hide your wives, it's Edge!", with Heyman also saying that he had two words for Edge "Matt 'Freaking' Hardy!", both references to Edge's real-life affair with Matt Hardy's long-term girlfriend, Lita. At the time of One Night Stand, Hardy was not employed by WWE, having been fired as a result of his internet rants against Edge and Lita, but Hardy was soon hired back shortly after the event. A huge "We want Matt" broke out in the Hammerstein Ballroom following Heyman's comments. Heyman then commented that the only reason JBL was WWE Champion for a year was because Triple H didn't want to work Tuesdays (a reference to the day SmackDown! is taped).

The Dudley Boyz then faced Tommy Dreamer and The Sandman in the main event. The Sandman entered the Hammerstein Ballroom through the crowd as Enter Sandman by Metallica played in full, with the fans enthusiastically singing along. As the match was about to begin, the bWo, a stable consisting of Hollywood Nova, Stevie Richards and The Blue Meanie entered the ring. Kid Kash interfered, and Balls Mahoney and Axl Rotten then came to the ring with steel chairs and took out the bWo. They attacked all three members of the bWo before hitting Nova with a steel chair twice. Styles made a reference to Simon Dean, the character Nova had recently played on WWE television, by stating "That's more painful than being Simon Dean on national TV." When the match eventually started, it involved trash cans, cheese graters and street signs. The Impact Players interfered, attacking Dreamer and Sandman. Francine, Dreamer's former manager, entered the ring and delivered a low blow to Dreamer. Dreamer's other valet and real life wife, Beulah McGillicutty, returned to wrestling for the first time in over seven years, sparking a catfight with Francine. The Dudley Boyz eventually won with the help of Spike Dudley. They sent Dreamer through a flaming table with a powerbomb to get the victory. The Dudleyz then attempted to attack McGillicutty before Sandman attacked them with a Singapore cane. Sandman shouted for a beer repeatedly. "Stone Cold" Steve Austin then made his way to the ring, with the ECW Originals coming out moments later. Austin referenced his time in ECW and then asked the crusaders to come to the ring. A huge brawl occurred, with the Originals fighting the Crusaders. The crowd chanted "We want Tazz", which brought Tazz to the ring and he then locked Kurt Angle in the Tazzmission. During the brawl, JBL legitimately attacked Blue Meanie, causing him to bleed. The Originals came out on top, as The Dudley Boyz performed a 3D on Bischoff, Benoit delivered a diving headbutt to Bischoff, and Mysterio performed a 619 on Bischoff. Austin asked for Bischoff's thoughts on the event while on the ground, and Bischoff replied, "Fuck ECW!". Austin then executed the Stone Cold Stunner on Bischoff to end the show.

After the show went off the air, the ECW wrestlers left the ring one at a time, but Dreamer stayed in the ring. He bowed to the ECW logo as the crowd chanted, "Thank you Tommy". The Dudley Boyz came back to the ring and hugged Dreamer, with Bubba Ray saying to Dreamer, "This is all for you".

== Reception ==
According to reports, many people backstage were very happy with the way One Night Stand went and many former ECW wrestlers that had worked the pay-per-view described it as a "fun" event. 325,000 people bought the event on pay-per-view. Many tried to order it through WWE's official website, but the website was shut down because not enough bandwidth was available.

Gunther has named the Awesome-Tanaka bout as his favorite WWE match ever.

== Aftermath ==
WWE adopted One Night Stand as an annual pay-per-view event and continued the theme of featuring hardcore-based matches on the show. The event returned to the Hammerstein Ballroom for ECW One Night Stand 2006. Just prior to this 2006 event, WWE established a third brand dubbed ECW for former wrestlers of the original promotion, as well as newer talent, to compete on. One Night Stand would continue for another two years (dropping the "ECW" name in 2007 and just being promoted as WWE), until it was replaced by Extreme Rules in 2009. One Night Stand was originally just renamed to Extreme Rules for 2009, but in 2010, WWE declared that Extreme Rules was its own chronology, one that was no longer part of the One Night Stand chronology. Extreme Rules, however, continued the hardcore-based theme.

== Results ==
No.	Results	Stipulations	Times
1	Lance Storm (with Dawn Marie) defeated Chris Jericho	Singles match	07:23
2	Super Crazy defeated Yoshihiro Tajiri (with The Sinister Minister and Mikey Whipwreck) and Little Guido (with Big Guido, Tracy Smothers, J.T. Smith, and Tony Mamaluke)	Three-Way Dance	06:14
3	Rey Mysterio defeated Psicosis	Singles match	06:23
4	Sabu (with Rob Van Dam and Bill Alfonso) defeated Rhyno	Singles match	06:31
5	Chris Benoit defeated Eddie Guerrero	Singles match	10:36
6	Mike Awesome defeated Masato Tanaka	Singles match	09:52
7	The Dudley Boyz (Bubba Ray and D-Von) defeated Tommy Dreamer and The Sandman	Tag team match	10:13

== See also ==
- List of ECW supercards and pay-per-view events
- WWE ECW
- Hardcore Homecoming
