= Full Blooded Italians =

Professional wrestling stable

- Little Guido and Tony Mamaluke celebrate a victory in Philadelphia's ECW Arena.

Stable
- Name: Full Blooded Italians
- Members: See below
- Billed from: Italy; Little Italy, New York City
- Former members: Big Guido; Chuck Palumbo; Davey Piezono; Johnny Stamboli; J. T. Smith; Mabel; Nunzio / Little Guido; One Man Gang; Sal Bellomo; Sal E. Graziano; Tommy Rich; Tony Mamaluke; Tracy Smothers; Trinity; Ulf Herman; Vito / Big Vito
- Debut: 1995
- Disbanded: 2024

The Full Blooded Italians (F.B.I.) are an American professional wrestling stable, and tag team that wrestled for Extreme Championship Wrestling (ECW) from the mid-1990s to early-2000s and for World Wrestling Entertainment (WWE) during the mid-2000s.

== History ==
=== Extreme Championship Wrestling (1996–2001) ===
The original Full Blooded Italians began in Extreme Championship Wrestling (ECW). After suffering a legitimate concussion at Wrestlepalooza in August 1995, J. T. Smith adopted the gimmick of believing himself to be an Old World Italian (despite being African American). Smith formed an alliance with the Italian American wrestler Val Puccio.

In April 1996 at Massacre on Queens Boulevard, Smith announced that he had discovered that Damien Stone was his Sicilian cousin, dubbing him "Little Guido". The partnership between Smith and Little Guido expanded to include multiple other wrestlers, including Tracy Smothers and Tommy Rich. Guido has been involved in every ECW and/or WWE incarnation of the F.B.I. The running gag of the group was that most of the wrestlers were obviously not of Italian descent, but they often claimed to be and acted in stereotypical Italian American ways, including none-too-subtle Mafia references, constant hand gestures, and praising famous Italian figures such as Frank Sinatra and Rocky Balboa. During their ECW run, the crowd would regularly chant "Where's my pizza?" at the group (Little Guido's family actually owned a pizzeria). The group would routinely come out to N-Trance's cover of the Bee Gees' "Stayin' Alive" and challenge their opponents to dance-offs.

The group imploded when Smothers and Rich departed the company, leaving Sal E. Graziano to manage Little Guido on his own. The group became less of a comedy act and more of a serious tandem until Tony Mamaluke was added to the duo in early 2000. Together, managed by Graziano, the group feuded with Mikey Whipwreck and Yoshihiro Tajiri, a team led by The Sinister Minister, over the ECW World Tag Team Championship. The group vied for number one contendership of the title in the company's dying months.

=== World Wrestling Entertainment (2003-2007, 2024) ===
==== First SmackDown! incarnation (2003–2004) ====
Little Guido had been competing on the SmackDown brand as Nunzio. After a loss to Rikishi, Nunzio threatened to bring in his "family" to gain revenge. The next week, he directed Chuck Palumbo and Johnny "The Bull" Stamboli to attack Rikishi. This latest incarnation was mainly referred to simply as "The FBI". It was heavily implied to be a mafia organization led by Nunzio, loosely based on the movie Goodfellas. This was further reinforced by video vignettes stylized by stakeout footage showing the trio involved with organized crime in New York City backstreets. Despite the publicity, they had very little success at first. Their fortunes changed after using a gimmick of running an illegal betting ring in the backstage area. This led to a series of feuds with notable wrestlers and tag teams, including Los Guerreros, Chris Benoit, The Undertaker, Rhyno, and the APA. The FBI was also used by Mr. McMahon and Jamie Noble (Nunzio's storyline cousin) to attack their rivals. When the group turned into fan favorites, they grew in popularity but just as they were getting over, Palumbo was sent to the WWE's Raw brand. This left Nunzio and Stamboli in the group. In November 2004, Palumbo and Stamboli were released, but Nunzio retained his current character.

==== Second SmackDown! incarnation (2005) ====
Vito appeared on the August 6, 2005 episode of Velocity by aiding Nunzio with a blackjack to help him win the Cruiserweight Championship from Paul London. Soon after, a profile of Vito in SmackDown! Magazine "officially" referred to the new twosome as "The F.B.I.". The two mainly competed in singles competition. Unlike previous members of the team, Vito often avoided helping Nunzio to keep himself out of peril. The team initially ended when the two had an argument in the ring. A few weeks later, Nunzio took offense to people thinking their alliance was over, and greater offense to suggestions that Vito was a cross-dresser. But once Nunzio saw the allegations to be true, he ended his ties to Vito.

==== ECW Brand (2006–2007) ====
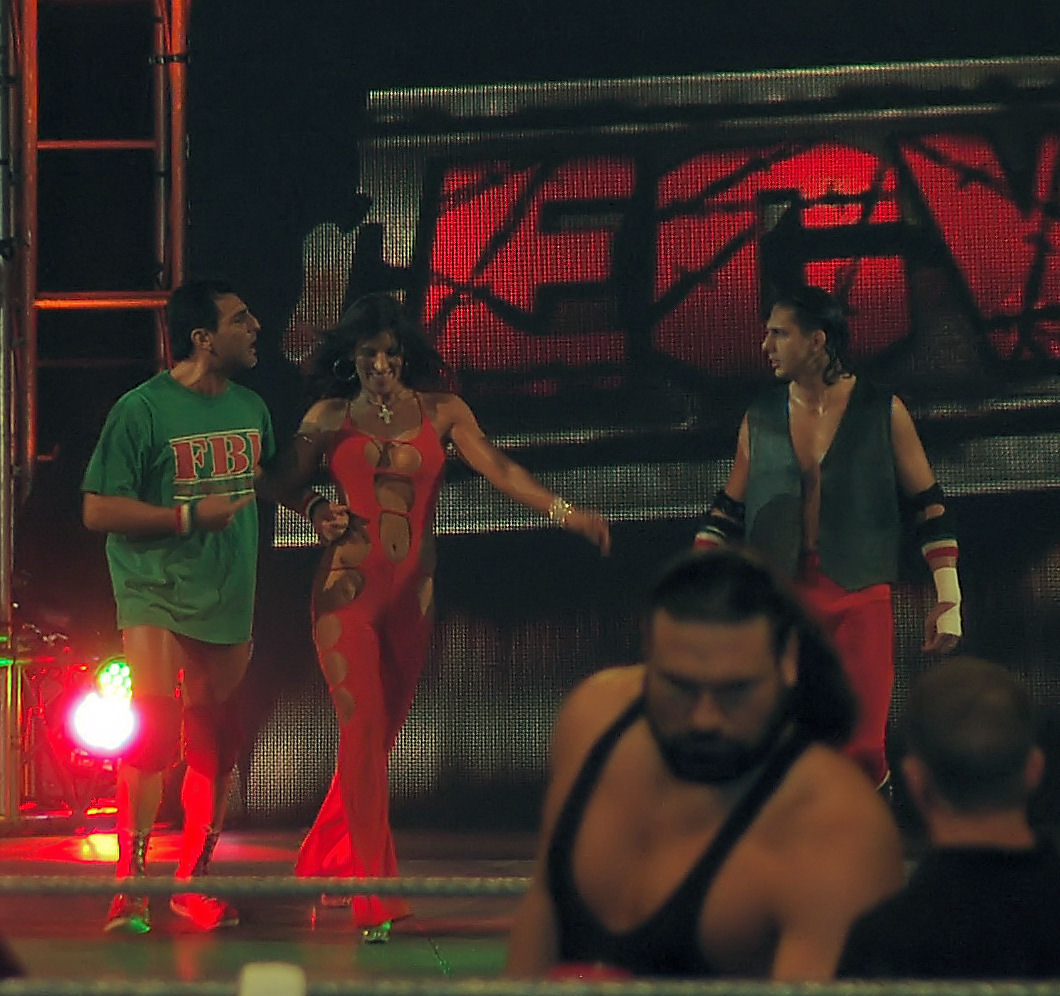
The Full Blooded Italians: Little Guido (left), Trinity (middle) and Tony Mamaluke (right) in 2006.

The F.B.I. from the original Extreme Championship Wrestling reunited briefly at the first-ever One Night Stand pay-per-view event in 2005. Members Tracy Smothers, Tony Mamaluke, Big Guido and J.T. Smith accompanied Little Guido for his match, and then reappeared in the final segment to close the show.

The final WWE incarnation of The FBI debuted at the 2006 event. Little Guido had moved over to the ECW brand to reunite his tag team with Mamaluke. They were now managed by newest member Trinity. Big Guido was also in their corner for the pay-per-view, and ECW television debut, but left the company that same week. The tag team mainly served as enhancement talent. Trinity eventually began making appearances without the tag team, and Tony Mamaluke was released from his WWE contract on January 18, 2007.

==== Latest incarnation & Sporadic appearance (2024) ====
The Full Blooded Italians would make their WWE return at NXT 2300 on November 6, 2024, where Mamaluke serves as the manager of Nunzio, whom challenge Tony D'Angelo for the NXT North American Championship, where Nunzio lost the match.

=== Independent circuit (2004-2013) ===
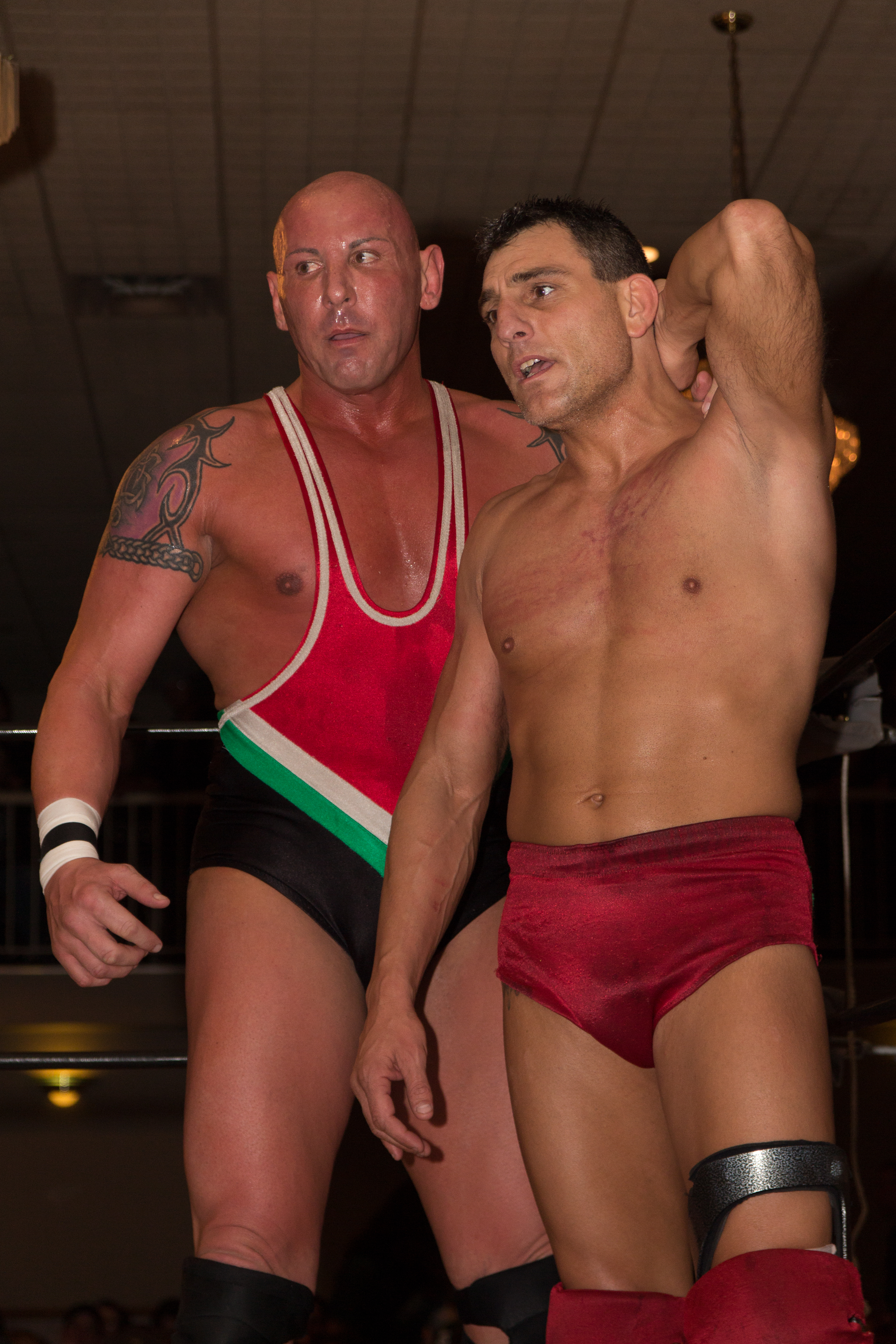
Big Vito (left) and Little Guido, two members of the Full Blooded Italians (F.B.I.) at the Hardcore Roadtrip's Born 2B Wired show in London, Ontario

After their release from WWE, Stamboli and Palumbo formed a tag team version of the F.B.I. in All Japan Pro Wrestling. Then they went to the Italy-based Nu-Wrestling Evolution, using the gimmick to make themselves top fan favorites in the company until they left the promotion at the end of the year. Also they went to Mexico and split up in 2006. On November 15, 2008, Little Guido and Tracy Smothers formed a version of the F.B.I. in Jersey All Pro Wrestling, and defeated the Latin American Xchange in their first match to win the Tag Team Championship. Their success did not last long, as the F.B.I. lost the titles to D-N-A (Dixie and Azrieal) on December 13.

The Full Blooded Italians were announced for the first-ever match of the new Extreme Reunion organization in 2009; which is conceived as a continuation of the original Extreme Championship Wrestling. Their opponents were announced as The Blue World Order (Stevie Richards and the Blue Meanie). They would lose to them. They reunited again on October 6, 2012, being defeated by Danny Doring and Roadkill in the House of Hardcore's first show.

Both Nunzio and Vito teamed together in 2013 in the independents.

=== Total Nonstop Action Wrestling (2010, 2024) ===
On August 4, 2010, it was confirmed that the F.B.I. would be taking part in Total Nonstop Action Wrestling's ECW reunion show, Hardcore Justice, on August 8. At the event Little Guido, Tony Mamaluke (billed as Tony Luke) and Tracy Smothers, accompanied by Sal E. Graziano, defeated Kid Kash, Simon Diamond and Johnny Swinger in a six-man tag team match. On the following edition of TNA Impact!, the ECW alumni, known collectively as EV 2.0 and represented by F.B.I. members Guido and Luke, were assaulted by A.J. Styles, Kazarian, Robert Roode, James Storm, Douglas Williams and Matt Morgan of Ric Flair's Fourtune stable, who thought they didn't deserve to be in TNA. The following week TNA president Dixie Carter gave Guido, Luke and the rest of EV 2.0 TNA contracts in order for them to settle their score with Fourtune. On the August 26 edition of Impact! Guido and Luke were squashed by Roode and Storm in a tag team match. The match ended F.B.I.'s association with TNA.

On May 3, 2024, the F.B.I returned on the Countdown To Under Siege with the returning Guido and new members, Ray Jaz and Zack Clayton, as they defeated The Batiri.

== Incarnations ==
| Years | Promotion | Members |
|---|---|---|
| 1995–1999 | Extreme Championship Wrestling | "The Big Don" Tommy Rich, "The Main Man" Tracy Smothers, Little Guido Maritato, Davey Piezono, Mabel, "The Italian Stallion" J.T. Smith, Sal E. Graziano, Big Guido, Big Val Puccio, Ulf Herman, One Man Gang, and Sal Bellomo |
| 2000–2001 | Extreme Championship Wrestling | Little Guido Maritato, Tony Mamaluke, and Sal E. Graziano |
| 2001–2002 | Various independent promotions | Little Guido & Tony Mamaluke |
| 2003–2004 | World Wrestling Entertainment (SmackDown! brand) | Nunzio, Johnny Stamboli, and Chuck Palumbo |
| 2005–2006 | WWE (SmackDown! brand) | Nunzio & Vito |
| 2005–2006 | All Japan Pro Wrestling, Nu-Wrestling Evolution, and various promotions in Mexico | Johnny Stamboli, and Chuck Palumbo |
| 2006 | WWE (ECW brand) | Little Guido, Trinity, Big Guido, and Tony Mamaluke |
| 2008 | JAPW | Little Guido & Tracy Smothers |
| 2009 | Legends of the Arena | Little Guido & Sal E. Graziano |
| 2010 | Total Nonstop Action Wrestling | Guido Maritato, Tony Luke, Tracy Smothers, and Sal E. Graziano |
| 2010 | Total Nonstop Action Wrestling | Guido Maritato & Tony Luke |
| 2010–2018 | Various independent promotions | Little Guido & Tony Mamaluke |
| 2011 | Elite Xtreme Wrestling | Johnny Stamboli, Vito, and Chuck Palumbo |
| 2011 | Maryland Wrestling Federation | Little Guido & Nicky Maritato |
| 2013 | Various independent promotions | Little Guido & Big Vito |
| 2013 | Big Time Wrestling | Nunzio & AJ Mitrano |
| 2015–2018 | Absolute Intense Wrestling and various independent promotions | Little Guido & Tracy Smothers |
| 2017–2020 | Rocket City Championship Wrestling | Tracy Smothers, A.C. Mack, Bugs O'Malley, Charlie Swingatore, Crazy Legs Avery, Eddie Toon, Freakshow, Ice Pick Murphy, James Brando, Jaxxon Vile, Knuckles Courageous, Tony Midas, and Yukon Jack |
| 2019 | Dropkick Diabetes | Nunzio, Mambo Italiano, and Joey Vincent Martini |
| 2022 | Figure Wrestling Federation | Little Guido & Johnny Clash |
| 2022 | Battleground Championship Wrestling | Little Guido, Luigi Primo, and Tommy Rich |
| 2022–2023 | Major League Wrestling | Little Guido & Ray Jaz |
| 2024 | Total Nonstop Action Wrestling | Little Guido, Ray Jaz, and Zack Clayton |
| 2024 | WrestleCon | Little Guido, Tommy Rich, Tony Mamaluke, and Deonna Purrazzo |
| 2024 | Battleground Championship Wrestling | Little Guido & Tommy Rich |
| 2024 | WWE (NXT 2300) | Nunzio & Tony Mamaluke (Manager) |
| 2024-present | New York Wrestling Connection | Little Guido, CJ Bambino, Dr. DeSano, Gary Reno, and Nicky Primo |
| 2025-present | Awesome Championship Wrestling | Little Guido, Ray Jaz, and Zack Clayton |

== Championships and accomplishments ==
- Extreme Championship Wrestling
  - ECW World Tag Team Championship (2 times) – Guido and Smothers (1) and Guido and Mamaluke (1)
- Jersey All Pro Wrestling
  - JAPW Tag Team Championship (1 time) – Maritato and Smothers
- World Wrestling Entertainment
  - WWE Cruiserweight Championship (2 times) – Nunzio
- Toryumon
  - Yamaha Cup (2006) – Palumbo and Stamboli

== See also ==
- The Mamalukes
