= Tony Mamaluke =

American professional wrestler (born 1977)

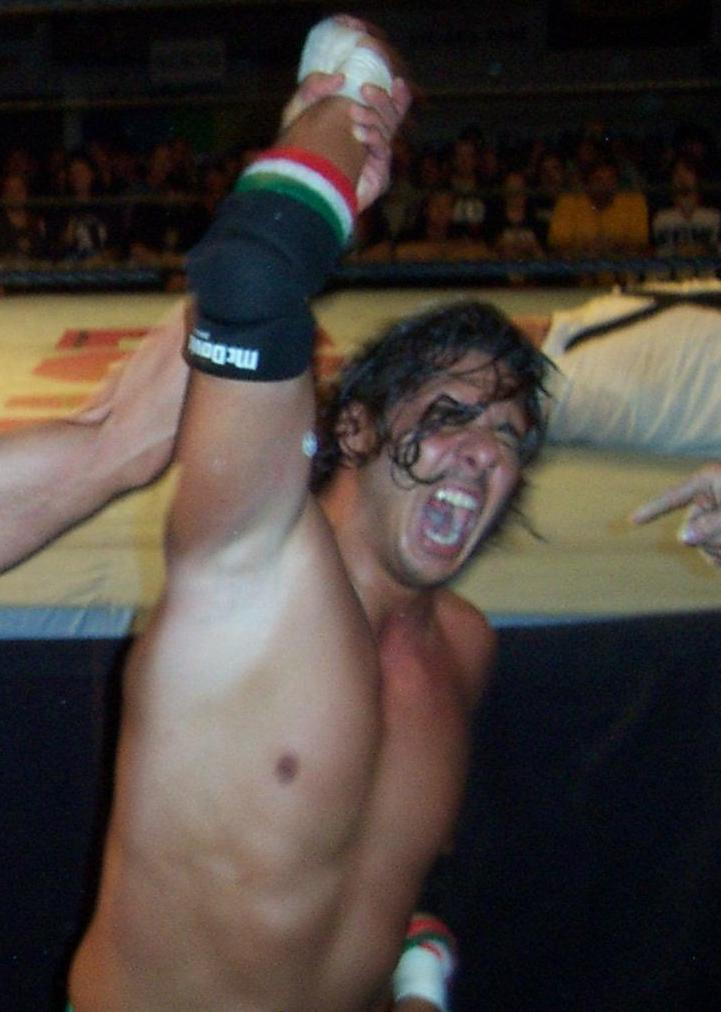
- Mamaluke in 2006

Personal information
- Born: Charles John Spencer; July 19, 1977 (age 49) Bensonhurst, Brooklyn, New York, U.S.

Professional wrestling career
- Ring name(s): Anthony LaGotto; Casanova Jones; C.G. Afi; Tony Luke; Tony Mamaluke; Tony Marinara
- Billed height: 5 ft 11 in (1.80 m)
- Billed weight: 219 lb (99 kg)
- Billed from: Little Italy
- Trained by: Dean Malenko
- Debut: 1998
- Retired: 2018

Charles John Spencer (born July 19, 1977) is an American retired professional wrestler. He is best known for his appearances with World Championship Wrestling under the ring name Tony Marinara and with Extreme Championship Wrestling and World Wrestling Entertainment under the ring name Tony Mamaluke.

== Professional wrestling career ==
=== Early career (1998–1999) ===
After being trained by Dean Malenko, Spencer began his wrestling career in 1998, working for independent promotions in Florida under the names C.G. Afi and Casanova Jones.

=== World Championship Wrestling (1999–2000) ===
Spencer debuted in World Championship Wrestling (WCW) in 1999 as an unnamed fan of wrestler Lodi, debuting in a Nitro Party clip then appearing in an outdoor segment when Lenny Lane and Lodi were arriving at a show in New York. He then appeared as a fan invader during many of Lodi and his brother Lenny's matches until the angle was dropped when Lenny and Lodi were removed from television in late 1999.

He returned shortly as "Tony Marinara", a New York mobster who managed the team of Big Vito and Johnny the Bull, who became known as The Mamalukes. His storyline included a feud with Disco Inferno, who kayfabe owed his "family" money. At one point, the feud also involved Lash LeRoux. His last appearance came at the 2000 Souled Out pay-per-view. In an interview with Gene Okerlund, he said he had to take care of some business and then left, never to appear in WCW again.

=== Extreme Championship Wrestling (2000–2001) ===
Not long after his release, he started working in Extreme Championship Wrestling. He took on the name "Tony Mamaluke", with the last name being a reference to the former tag team he managed in WCW, as well as a play on Philadelphia's famous Tony Luke's restaurant. He joined The Full Blooded Italians, which consisted of Little Guido and Big Sal E. Graziano. The reasoning for his alignment with this group was a combination of his previous gimmick in WCW being similar, as well as his resemblance to the character Christopher Moltisanti of the Italian-American mobster television series The Sopranos. As part of his gimmick, the ring announcer announced his weight in liquid ounces rather than pounds or kilograms, due to his unusually small stature. The two also began using the liquid ounce measurement as a reference to the size difference between the two smaller active wrestlers, and their large manager. His debut match was against Mikey Whipreck on ECW on TNN, in which Mamaluke took a couple hardcore bumps. Spencer was initially a member in training, until he became a full-fledged member when the tandem captured the World Tag Team Championship from the Unholy Alliance on August 25, 2000, on Day Two of Ballroom Blitz, which was ECW's debut at the Hammerstein Ballroom in New York. The two teams feuded for several months, with their respective managers, Big Sal and The Sinister Minister creating further conflict. They lost the title, however, on December 3, 2000 at Massacre On 34th Street to Danny Doring and Roadkill. During this time, he also feuded with Super Crazy and Kid Kash. He stayed with ECW until the company was declared bankrupt in April 2001.

=== Independent circuit (2001–2018) ===
After ECW folded, Mamaluke worked for NWA Wildside, Total Nonstop Action Wrestling, and World Wrestling All-Stars. He then joined Ring of Honor, where he feuded with his former-partner Little Guido and also where he tag-teamed with R. J. Brewer as "The Purists." In late 2003, Mamaluke relocated to Los Angeles to train in martial arts at the New Japan Pro-Wrestling Inoki Dojo. He eventually returned to pro wrestling in 2005, winning the ROH World Tag Team Championship with Sal Rinauro in his first match back in Ring of Honor. The duo held the belts from October 1, 2005 to December 17, when they lost them at Final Battle 2005. On February 24, 2018 Tony Mamaluke returned for one final match at The Dynasty event in Amsterdam, New York just minutes away from where he graduated. Mamaluke teamed with Little Guido one last time to take on The Dynasty tag team champions The Conspiracy Horseman Bin Hamin and Stevie Richards. Mamaluke and Little Guido were defeated by the Conspiracy Horsemen in Mamaluke's final professional wrestling match.

Mamaluke retired from professional wrestling on February 24, 2018.

=== World Wrestling Entertainment (2005, 2006–2007, 2024) ===
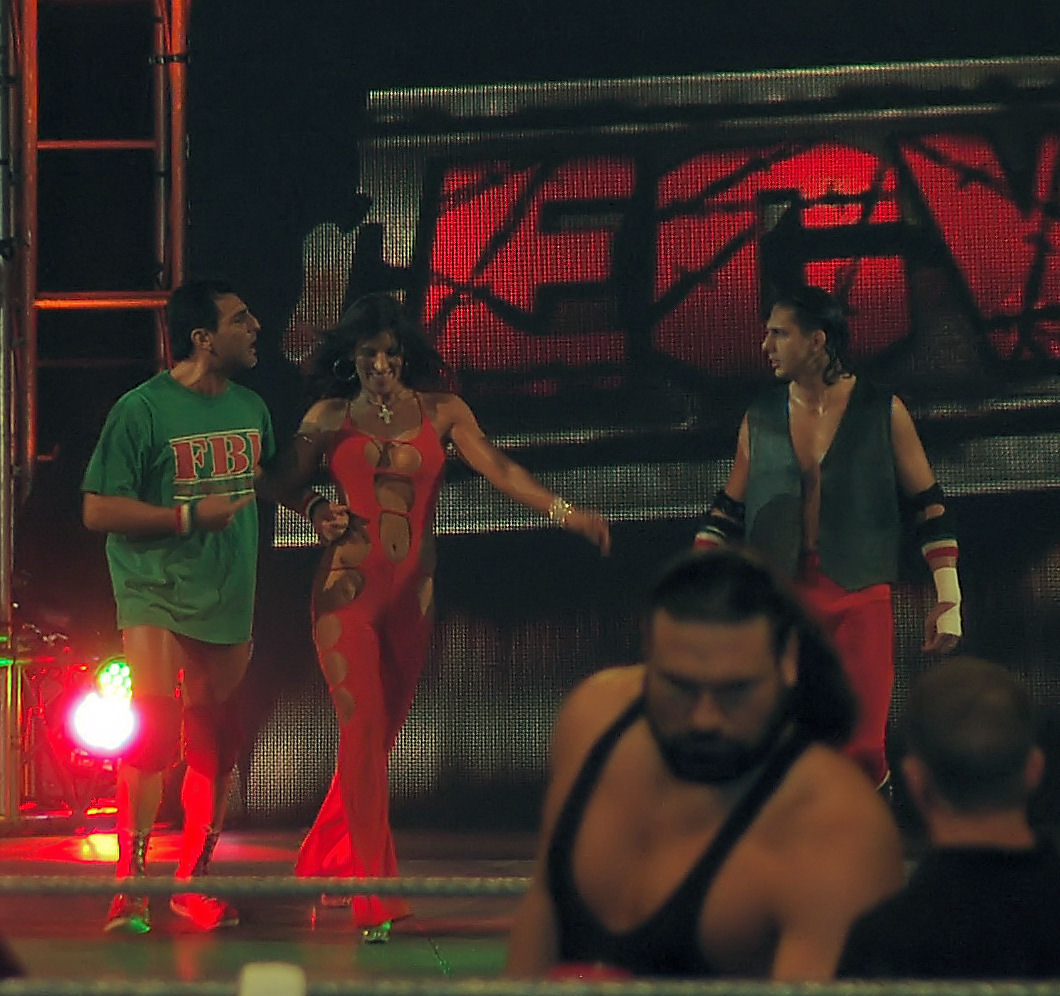
The Full Blooded Italians: Little Guido (left), Trinity (middle) and Tony Mamaluke (right) in 2006.

During 2005, WWE held a reunion ECW show entitled One Night Stand, Little Guido and Mamaluke appeared with other original Full Blooded Italians at the pay-per-view. In April 2006, WWE decided to revive ECW as a new brand, and Mamaluke was among several ECW alumni that signed contracts with WWE to participate as full-time competitors for the new ECW. Mamaluke debuted on June 7, 2006 at WWE vs. ECW: Head to Head, participating in the battle royal between ECW and a contingent of Raw/SmackDown! superstars.

Mamaluke made his pay-per-view debut at One Night Stand 2006, reviving his role as a member of the Full Blooded Italians with Little Guido; the duo was accompanied by Big Guido. The duo faced Yoshihiro Tajiri and Super Crazy in tag team action, picking up the victory. From there, he continued to team with Guido and was accompanied by Trinity. He only appeared sporadically on ECW on Sci-Fi in losing attempts in both singles and tag team action against the likes of Sabu, The Hardys, Mike Knox, and Test. The Full Blooded Italians appeared on pay-per-view once again on December 3, 2006 at December to Dismember in a losing effort to Sylvester Terkay and Elijah Burke.

On January 18, 2007, Mamaluke was released from his WWE contract with several other wrestlers.

At NXT 2300 on November 6, 2024, Spencer, as Tony Mamaluke, returned to WWE alongside Maritato, as Nunzio, who challenged Tony D'Angelo for the NXT North American Championship, where Nunzio lost the match.

=== Total Nonstop Action Wrestling / Impact Wrestling (2010, 2022) ===
On August 8, 2010, Mamaluke returned to TNA to take part in ECW reunion show, Hardcore Justice, where he, under the name "Tony Luke" due to WWE trademark reasons, Little Guido and Tracy Smothers defeated Kid Kash, Simon Diamond and Johnny Swinger in a six-man tag team match. On the following edition of TNA Impact!, the ECW alumni, known collectively as EV 2.0, were assaulted by A.J. Styles, Kazarian, Robert Roode, James Storm, Douglas Williams and Matt Morgan of Ric Flair's Fourtune stable, who thought they did not deserve to be in TNA. The following week TNA president Dixie Carter gave each member of EV 2.0 TNA contracts in order for them to settle their score with Fourtune. On the August 26 edition of Impact!, Luke and Guido were squashed by Roode and Storm in a tag team match in what turned out to be the F.B.I.'s final match in TNA.

In 2022, Mamaluke, along with Guido Maritato made an appearance for TNA, then known as Impact Wrestling, on the April 21 episode of Impact!, brawling with The Major Players (Brian Myers and Matt Cardona). He then appeared ringside for Maritato's match against Cardona for the Impact Digital Media Championship, where Maritato was unsuccessful.

== Championships and accomplishments ==
- Extreme Championship Wrestling
  - ECW World Tag Team Championship (1 time) – with Little Guido
- Pro Wrestling Illustrated
  - PWI ranked him #201 of the top 500 singles wrestlers in the PWI 500 in 2003
- Ring of Honor
  - ROH Tag Team Championship (1 time) – with Sal Rinauro
- Southern Championship Wrestling (Florida)
  - SCW Florida Southern Heavyweight Championship (1 time)

== See also ==
- Full Blooded Italians
- Mamalukes
