= Nunzio (wrestler) =

American professional wrestler (born 1972)

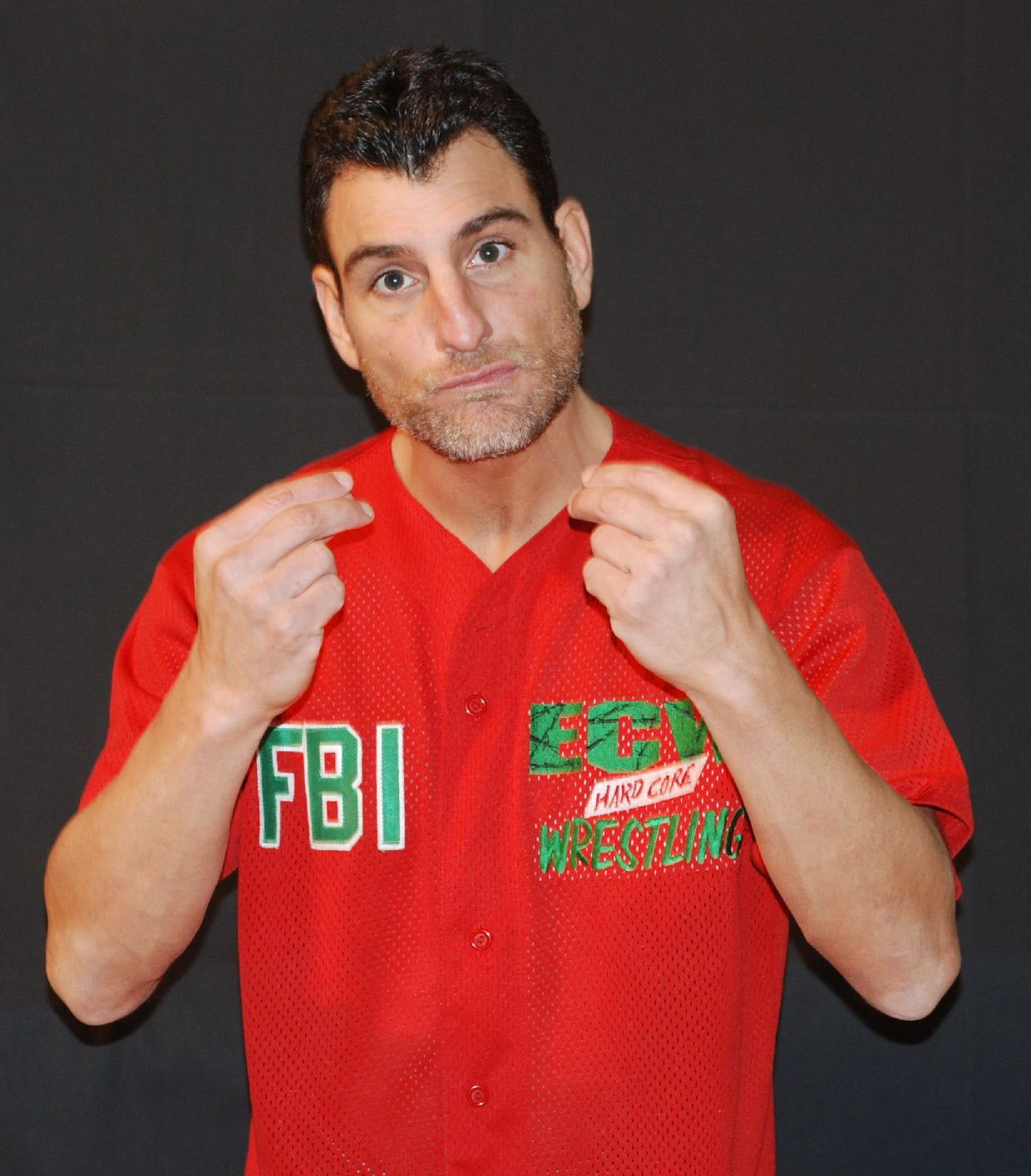
- Nunzio in 2010

Personal information
- Born: March 12, 1972 (age 54) Howard Beach, Queens, New York City, U.S.

Professional wrestling career
- Ring name(s): Damien Stone; Guido Maritato; James Maritato; James Stone; Jeff the Killer; Little Guido; Little Guido Maritato; Nunzio; Tony Broadway
- Billed height: 5 ft 7 in (170 cm)
- Billed weight: 170 lb (77 kg)
- Billed from: Rockland County, New York; Little Italy, New York City; Italy
- Trained by: Billy Robinson
- Debut: 1991

James Maritato (born March 12, 1972) is an American professional wrestler, best known for his work in Extreme Championship Wrestling (ECW) and World Wrestling Entertainment (WWE) under the ring names Little Guido and Nunzio. A high-school football player and amateur wrestler, he trained under Billy Robinson, making his professional debut in the early nineties. He joined Eastern Championship Wrestling initially as an enhancement talent, as well as competing in the shoot style UWF International promotion. Maritato later returned to ECW (now Extreme Championship Wrestling), being given the gimmick of “Little Guido” as part of the comedy stable the Full Blooded Italians (F.B.I). He would stay with the promotion until its closure in January 2001.

After ECW closed its doors, Maritato worked on the independent circuit before he was signed to a contract by WWE in 2002. There he was part of the promotion's cruiserweight division until its disbandment in 2007, as well as a new version of the F.B.I Stable. He would take part in the ECW One Night Stand events as well as the relaunch of the franchise as a third brand before leaving WWE and returning to the independent circuit.

== Early life ==
While attending Nanuet Senior High School (located in Rockland County, New York), Maritato competed in football (as part of the school's 1989 team that went undefeated and unscored upon) and wrestling.

== Professional wrestling career ==
=== Early career (1991–1992) ===
Maritato was trained as a professional wrestler by Billy Robinson. He debuted in 1991, facing Eric Fox at Parsippany Smith Fields in his first match. He competed for the Amarillo, Texas-based USWF promotion under the name James Stone.

=== Eastern Championship Wrestling (1992–1994) ===
Maritato joined Eastern Championship Wrestling (ECW) under the ring name "Damien Stone" on July 14, 1992, where he lost to Tommy Cairo. Over the next two years, he wrestled intermittently with ECW as a jobber. He also wrestled for International World Class Championship Wrestling and other promotions in the Northeastern United States.

=== UWF International (1995–1996) ===
Maritato took some time off from ECW in 1995 and went to Japan to compete in the shoot style UWF International promotion.

=== Extreme Championship Wrestling (1996–2001) ===
Maritato returned to Eastern Championship Wrestling - by now known as Extreme Championship Wrestling - at the Big Ass Extreme Bash in March 1996. At Massacre on Queens Boulevard in April 1996, "The Italian Stallion" J.T. Smith announced that "Damien Stone" was in fact his Sicilian cousin, "Little Guido". Smith and Little Guido formed the comedy stable Full Blooded Italians (F.B.I.), which grew to include multiple other members.

During 1999, he became a "serious wrestler", although still accompanied by Sal E. Graziano and proclaiming himself to be an F.B.I. member (though only the two of them were left). After his turn he was involved in some intense singles matches until late 2000, when he formed a tag team with Tony Mamaluke. The duo won the World Tag Team Championship on August 26, 2000, and held them until December when they lost them to Danny Doring and Roadkill. They continued to wrestle together until ECW folded in January 2001.

=== Independent circuit (2001–2002) ===
When ECW closed, Maritato wrestled for several independent promotions, mostly in the New York Tri-State area; he often teamed with former partner Tony Mamaluke. They had a notable run in Ring of Honor before Maritato was signed by World Wrestling Entertainment in 2002.

=== World Wrestling Entertainment/ WWE (2002–2008, 2010–2011, 2024) ===
==== Alliance with Jamie Noble; Full Blooded Italians (2002–2004) ====
Maritato was introduced on WWE television as Nunzio (a possible reference to the mob/bodyguard characters Guido and Nunzio in the MythAdventures series of books by Robert Asprin). As the on-screen heel cousin of Jamie Noble, he attacked Crash Holly during a match with Noble on the December 12, 2002 edition of SmackDown!. Nunzio began a feud with Holly after this, defeating him on several occasions before going on to face the likes of Tajiri, Shannon Moore, and Chuck Palumbo.

The team and cousin storyline of Nunzio and Noble soon faded. Nunzio reformed the Full Blooded Italians, this time with Johnny "The Bull" Stamboli and Chuck Palumbo, but the team found little success. F.B.I. began a feud with The Undertaker after attacking him on an episode of SmackDown! after WrestleMania XIX, in which The Undertaker was absent until after Judgment Day and defeat all three in singles matches in consecutive weeks, the feud ended in the summer when The Undertaker began a rivalry with John Cena. After WrestleMania XX, Palumbo was drafted to Raw, and the F.B.I. was reduced to a tag team. After Stamboli was released, Nunzio began competing in the cruiserweight division.

==== Cruiserweight Champion; alliance with Vito (2005–2006) ====
In 2005, Maritato returned to his Little Guido persona for one night; he reunited with the original Full Blooded Italians to take on Super Crazy and Tajiri in a three-way match at the ECW reunion show One Night Stand.

As Nunzio, he continued to perform on SmackDown! B-show Velocity as both a fan favorite and a villain, forming a short-lived tag team with Funaki. On the August 6 (taped on August 2) edition of Velocity, Nunzio won the Cruiserweight Championship by defeating Paul London after a new villainous wrestler, Vito, made his debut by giving Nunzio a blackjack, which he used to knock London out. Nunzio joined forces with Vito, thus becoming a full-time villain.

The pair began feuding with The Mexicools and at No Mercy, Mexicool member Juventud defeated Nunzio with a Juvi Driver to take the Cruiserweight Championship. Nunzio regained the title on November 15 at a house show in Rome, Italy but lost it right back to Juventud on the November 25 SmackDown.

Nunzio and Vito would both briefly turn into fan favorites by briefly engaging in a feud against Gregory Helms. Vito and Nunzio would quickly go back to being villains, however, due to Vito's new godfather gimmick.

In late-May 2006, Nunzio's partnership with Vito began to crumble after it was revealed that, in storyline, Vito enjoyed cross-dressing, which made Nunzio feel betrayed and embarrassed. Nunzio ended his alliance with Vito, and moved to the ECW brand.

==== Full Blooded Italians reunion; departure (2006–2008) ====
In June when the ECW brand was launched, Nunzio left SmackDown to join other "ECW originals" on ECW, retaking his Little Guido name in the process. F.B.I. was revived again, this time with Little Guido as a face once again, alongside Tony Mamaluke and Trinity and for a short while, Big Guido. The F.B.I. were used for tag matches on ECW to either take on debuting tag teams or facing another tag team when a tag match was needed. At December to Dismember, they took on Elijah Burke and Sylvester Terkay in a losing effort. His partner Tony Mamaluke was released on January 18, leaving Guido and Trinity alone to carry on the stable.

After Mamaluke's release, Little Guido vanished from television (he only appeared once on ECW on Sci Fi with the Little Guido name). After his hiatus, he later returned on the April 17, 2007 episode (in Italy, where he was well received by fans) using his old Nunzio name again but without Trinity, who had been released in June. After losses to the debuting Johnny Nitro and The Miz, Nunzio disappeared from television for a few months. He returned on the September 11 edition of ECW, in a losing effort to Matt Striker. Nunzio was used mainly as a jobber during this period, losing to Tommy Dreamer, Jamie Noble, Kevin Thorn, and Kenny Dykstra.

In 2008, Nunzio returned on January 15, in a losing effort against Shelton Benjamin, and on his next appearance, on April 8, he lost to Elijah Burke. He then engaged in a brief feud with Mark Henry, but came out on the losing end. After nearly 2 years, Nunzio finally won a broadcast match on May 5, as he was in a handicap match along with the rest of the ECW roster against Triple H and Mr. Kennedy.

On August 8, 2008, Nunzio was released from his WWE contract.

==== Referee (2010–2011) ====
Maritato appeared at a house show for WWE Raw, at Madison Square Garden on December 26, 2010, as a referee when the majority of referees could not make it to the arena due to blizzards and gale-force winds; this position expanded to televised events on February 1. On September 29, 2011, Maritato announced that he was no longer working for WWE.

==== NXT appearance (2024) ====
At NXT 2300 on November 6, 2024, Maritato, as Nunzio, returned to WWE to challenge Tony D'Angelo for the NXT North American Championship, where Nunzio lost the match.

=== Return to the independent circuit (2008–present) ===
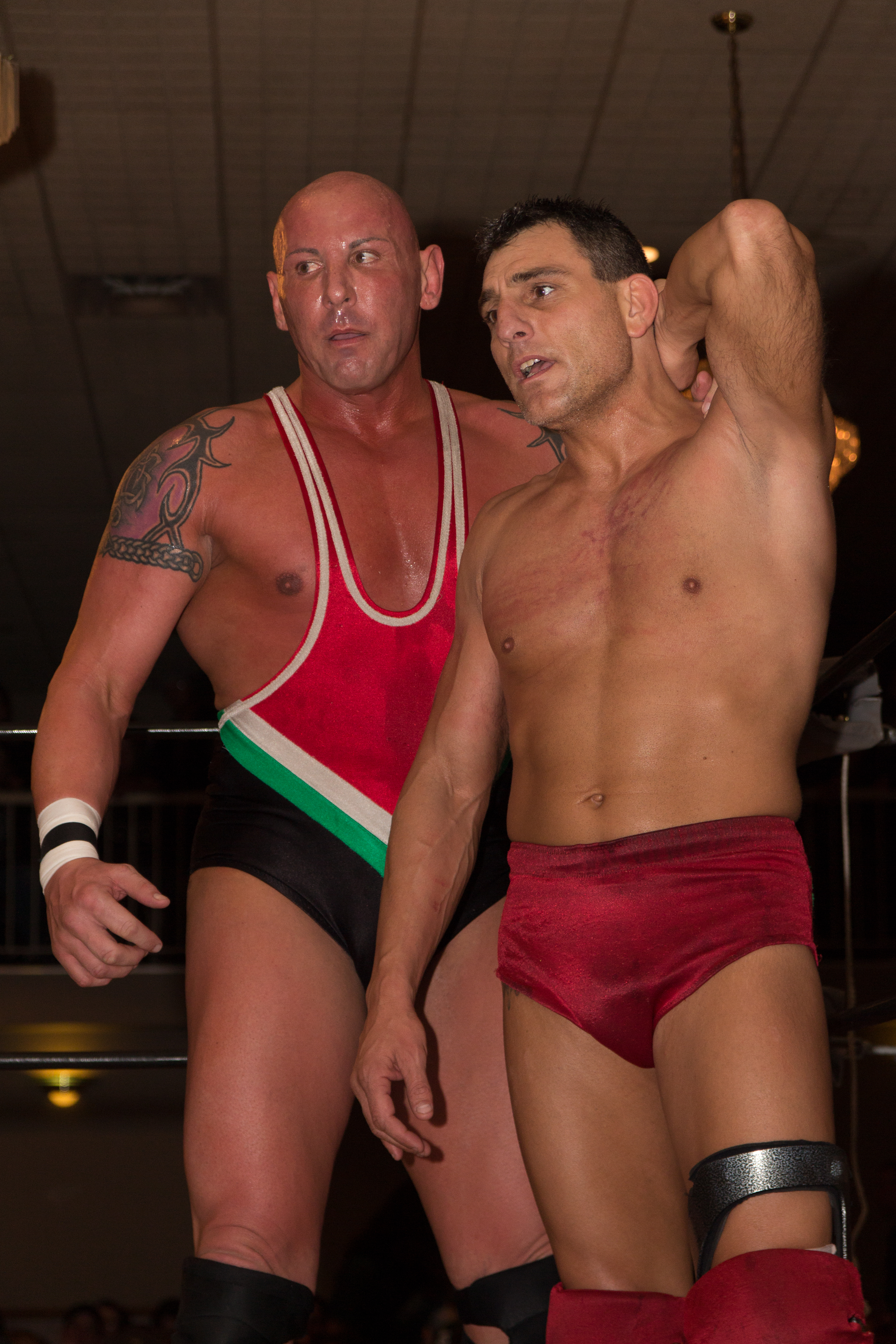
Maritato (right) and Big Vito in 2013.

Maritato wrestled for Jersey All Pro Wrestling on September 19. On November 15, he won the JAPW Tag Team Championship with Tracy Smothers. On January 16, 2009, Maritato was inducted into the ECPW Hall of Fame.

In February 2009, it was announced that Maritato would be a trainer for the "Bodyslam U" professional wrestling school in New Jersey, while still competing on the independent circuit. On March 13, 2009, Guido lost to Shane Douglas, who made his return to the National Wrestling Alliance for the first time since Douglas drops the NWA World Heavyweight Championship in nearly fifteen years. In June, Guido returned to Ring of Honor losing to Jay Briscoe at the Hammerstein Ballroom in New York City. In late 2009, Maritato began competing for the National Wrestling Alliance under the name Nunzio. He also performed for the NWA On Fire expansion based out of New England. Maritato reunited again on October 6, 2012, as F.B.I., being defeated by Danny Doring and Roadkill in the House of Hardcore's first show. At House of Hardcore 2, now returning under his "Little Guido" ring name, faced Vik Dalishus in a losing effort. On June 6, 2014, at House of Hardcore 4, Maritato defeated Matt Striker. Maritato wrestled at House of Hardcore's next event on June 7, 2014, in which he defeated Danny Doring.

At House of Hardcore 7, Maritato teamed up with Team Tremendous (Bil Carr and Dan Barry) to take on Anthony Greene, Ben Ortiz, and Vik Dalishus in a winning effort. He then took part in a ten-man tag team match at House of Hardcore 10, teaming up with Officer Colt Cabana, Bill Carr, Dan Barry, and F.B.I. member Tony Mamaluke, to successfully defeat Afa Jr., Jade, Lance Anoa'i, L.A. Smooth, and Vik Dalishus.

=== Total Nonstop Action Wrestling / Impact Wrestling (2010, 2022, 2025) ===
On August 8, 2010, Maritato took part in Total Nonstop Action Wrestling's ECW reunion show, Hardcore Justice, where he, Tony Mamaluke (billed as Tony Luke) and Tracy Smothers defeated Kid Kash, Simon Diamond and Johnny Swinger in a six-man tag team match. On the following edition of TNA Impact!, the ECW alumni, known collectively as Extreme, Version 2.0 (EV 2.0), were assaulted by A.J. Styles, Kazarian, Robert Roode, James Storm, Douglas Williams and Matt Morgan of Ric Flair's Fourtune stable, who thought they didn't deserve to be in TNA. The following week TNA president Dixie Carter gave each member of EV 2.0 TNA contracts in order for them to settle their score with Fourtune. On the August 26 edition of Impact! Guido and Luke were squashed by Roode and Storm in a tag team match. The match ended F.B.I.'s association with TNA. Maritato was announced as a part of the new Total Nonstop Action India based project Ring Ka King working under the name Tony Broadway teaming with Joey Hollywood. However Ring Ka King only lasted one season and ended the same year.

In 2022, Maritato made an appearance for Total Nonstop Action Wrestling, then known as Impact Wrestling, on the April 21 episode of Impact!, challenging Matt Cardona for the Impact Digital Media Championship, where he was unsuccessful.

Returned in 2025 accompanying Zack Clayton in the Call your Shot Gauntlet match at the TNA Bound for Glory PPV .

== Other media ==
In 1996, Maritato competed in a mixed martial arts fight in Texas against Steve Nelson, who was also his past opponent in UWFi. The fight appears on Nelson's official MMA record as a win. Maritato competed under the name James Stone, which he also wrestled under during its stint in UWFi.

On March 6, 2006, Maritato was seen supporting his brother on the NBC game show Deal or No Deal in which he won $25,000.

In 2026, Maritato was the author of the foreword to the book On Officiating: The Professional Wrestling Referee’s Rulebook by Kris Levin.

== Championships and accomplishments ==
- Chaotic Wrestling
  - CW Tag Team Championship (1 time) – with Luis Ortiz
- East Coast Pro Wrestling
  - ECPW Light Heavyweight Championship (1 time)
  - ECPW Hall of Fame (Class of 2009)
- New York Wrestling Connection
  - NYWC Trios Championship (1 time) – with CJ Bambino and Nicky Primo
- Extreme Championship Wrestling
  - ECW World Tag Team Championship (2 times) – with Tracy Smothers (1) and Tony Mamaluke (1)
- Impact Championship Wrestling
  - ICW Hip Swivel Towel Championship (1 time)
- Jersey All Pro Wrestling
  - JAPW Tag Team Championship (1 time) – with Tracy Smothers
- Pro Wrestling Illustrated
  - Ranked No. 79 of the top 500 singles wrestlers in the PWI 500 in 2003
- USA Pro Wrestling
  - USA Pro United States Championship (1 time)
  - USA Pro Tag Team Championship (2 times) – with Rahul Kay (1) and Kid Kruel (1)
- World Wrestling Entertainment
  - WWE Cruiserweight Championship (2 times)
