= List of former Pro Wrestling America personnel =

Pro Wrestling America is a professional wrestling promotion based in Minneapolis, Minnesota since 1985. Former employees in PWA consisted of professional wrestlers, managers, play-by-play and color commentators, announcers, interviewers and referees.

== Alumni ==
=== Male wrestlers ===
| Birth name: | Ring name(s): | Tenure: | Notes |
|---|---|---|---|
| Adnan El Farthie ^{†} | Sheik Adnan Al-Kassie | 1990, 1994 | |
| Jon Benkowski | JB Trask | 1990, 1994–1996 | |
| Kenny Benkowski | Kenny Jay | 1994–1995 | |
| Wayne Bloom | Wayne Bloom | 1995, 1997 | |
| Shane Bower | Mystic | 1991 | |
| Leonard Brand | Stiff Jackson | 1996 | |
| Terry Brunk | Sabu | 1993 | |
| Larry Cameron ^{†} | Larry Cameron | 1987–1990, 1993 | |
| Chris Candido ^{†} | Chris Candido | 1993 | |
| Leonard Carlson | Lenny Lane | 1995–1998 | |
| Tom Cassett ^{†} | Teijo Khan | 1990–1991 | |
| Thomas Couch^{†} | Tommy Rogers | 1987 | |
| Barry Darsow | Blacktop Bully | 1995 | |
| John Devine | Horace the Psychopath | 1993, 1995–1996 | |
| Mike Enos | Mike Enos | 1995 | |
| Doug Fisher | Terminator Wolf | 1985–1987 | |
| Terry Funk ^{†} | Terry Funk | 1993 | |
| Michael Hegstrand ^{†} | Road Warrior Hawk | 1993–1994 | |
| James Hines | Bobby Fulton | 1987 | |
| Tim Hunt ^{†} | Hunter / Tim Hunt | 1989–1990 | |
| Jerry Lynn | Jerry Lynn | 1990–1993, 1994–1995 | |
| Edward McDaniel ^{†} | Wahoo McDaniel | 1995 | |
| Masanori Murakawa | The Great Sasuke | 1996 | |
| Charles Norris ^{†} | Charlie Norris | 1989–1992, 1994–1996 | |
| Steve Olsonoski | Steve O | 1990 | |
| Chris Pallies ^{†} | King Kong Bundy | 1997 | |
| Brian Parker | White Tiger | 1989-1990 | |
| Ken Patera | Ken Patera | 1991–1992, 1997 | |
| James Raschke | Baron von Raschke | 1991–1992, 1994–1995 | |
| Robert Rechsteiner | Rick Steiner | 1990 | |
| Scott Rechsteiner | Scott Steiner | 1990 | |
| Steve Regal | Steve Regal | 1985–1986 | |
| Brad Rheingans | Brad Rheingans | 1993 | |
| Dan Rignati | Terminator Riggs | 1985–1987, 1991 | |
| Ted Russell ^{†} | Savannah Jack | 1985 | |
| Masanori Saito ^{†} | Masa Saito | 1993 | |
| Peter Senerchia | The Tasmaniac | 1993 | |
| Mike Sharpe ^{†} | Iron Mike Sharpe | 1997 | |
| Michael Smith | Sam Houston | 1994–1995 | |
| Carl Stevens ^{†} | Ray Stevens | 1991 | |
| Maurice Vachon ^{†} | Mad Dog Vachon | 1985–1986 | |
| Kevin Wacholz | The Convict / Nailz | 1994–1995, 1997 | |
| Sean Waltman | The Lightning Kid | 1990–1991 | |
| Jeff Warner | Silencer / J.W. Storm | 1989–1990, 1994–1997 | |
| Tom Zenk ^{†} | Tom Zenk | 1995 | |
| Eugene Zumhofe | Buck Zumhofe | 1994–1995 | |
| Shawn Crossen | Crusher Crossen | 1986,1989–1990 | |
| Troy Steenerson | Slick Steenerson | 1989–1990 | |
| Unknown | Alan Omega | 1997 | |
| Unknown | Anthony Wright | 1989 | |
| Unknown | Bass Lee | 1995 | |
| Unknown | Bear Grizzly | 1997 | |
| Unknown | Billy Blaze | 1995–1997 | |
| Unknown | The Blues Man | 1995 | |
| Unknown | Bret Derringer | 1989 | |
| Unknown | Chi-Town Thug | 1996 | |
| Unknown | The Chosen One | 1993–1994 | |
| Unknown | Cory Wamsley | 1997 | |
| Unknown | Dan Jesser | 1994–1996 | |
| Unknown | Derrick Dukes | 1987, 1991, 1994, 1996 | |
| Unknown | Ed Roberts | 1985 | |
| Unknown | Halloween Nightmare | 1990 | |
| Unknown | Hans Hessler | 1994–1995 | |
| Unknown | The Hater / Punisher Sledge | 1991–1997 | |
| Unknown | Helmut Hessler | 1994–1995 | |
| Unknown | Jesse Hennig | 1994–1995 | |
| Unknown | Johnny Love | 1987–1991 | |
| Unknown | The Joker | 1997 | |
| Unknown | JR Carson | 1990–1991 | |
| Unknown | The Kamikaze Kid | 1995 | |
| Unknown | The Mangler | 1995 | |
| Unknown | Masked Maniac I | 1987 | |
| Unknown | Masked Maniac II | 1987 | |
| Unknown | Matt Derringer | 1989–1990 | |
| Unknown | Menace 2 Society | 1997 | |
| Unknown | Mohammad Akbar | 1994 | |
| Unknown | Mr. Dynamic | 1994 | |
| Unknown | The Night Stalker | 1995 | |
| Unknown | The Professor | 1994–1995 | |
| Unknown | The Punisher | 1990–1991, 1994–1995 | |
| Unknown | Punisher Hammer | 1991–1992 | |
| Unknown | Randy Gusto | 1990–1991, 1993–1996 | |
| Unknown | Ravishing Ronny | 1990 | |
| Unknown | Red Tyler | 1990, 1995 | |
| Unknown | Ricky Rice | 1986–1991 | |
| Unknown | Sampson | 1995 | |
| Unknown | Scott Serlack | 1994 | |
| Unknown | Scotty Z | 1995–1997 | |
| Unknown | The Shocker | 1991 | |
| Unknown | Steve Berg | 1991–1992 | |
| Unknown | T. Rex | 1994 | |
| Unknown | Texas Hangman I | 1990 | |
| Unknown | Texas Hangman II | 1990 | |
| Unknown | Tommy Ferrara | 1986–1993, 1995 | |
| Unknown | Tony DeNucci | 1991–1992 | |
| Unknown | Wellington Wilkins Jr. | 1996 | |
| Unknown | Willie The Splash | 1990 | |

=== Midget wrestlers ===
| Birth name: | Ring name(s): | Tenure: | Notes |
|---|---|---|---|
| Shigeri Akabane ^{†} | Little Tokyo | 1994 | |
| Unknown | The Karate Kid | 1994 | |

=== Stables and tag teams ===
| Tag team/Stable(s) | Members | Tenure(s) |
|---|---|---|
| The Derringers | Bret Derringer and Matt Derringer | 1989–1990 |
| The Fantastics | Tommy Rogers and Bobby Fulton | 1987 |
| The Hate Troopers | | 1996 |
| The Masked Maniacs | Masked Maniac I and Masked Maniac II | 1987 |
| Maximum Overdrive | Hunter and Silencer | 1989–1990 |
| Miami Vice Defenders | Savannah Jack and Ed Roberts | 1985 |
| The Punishers | Sledge and Hammer | 1991–1992 |
| The Steiner Brothers | Rick Steiner and Scott Steiner | 1990 |
| The Storm Troopers | Hans Hessler and Helmut Hessler | 1994–1995 |
| The Terminators | Terminator Riggs and Terminator Wolf | 1985–1987 |
| The Texas Hangman | Texas Hangman I and Texas Hangman II | 1990 |
| Thunderblood | Charlie Norris and Derrick Dukes | 1996 |
| Top Guns | Ricky Rice and Derrick Dukes | 1987 |
| The Wild Boys | Tim Hunt and Steve Berg | 1991 |

=== Managers and valets ===
| Birth name: | Ring name(s): | Tenure: | Notes |
|---|---|---|---|
| Mark Koval | The Golden Idol | 1987–1992 | |
| Steve Engstrom | Pretty Boy Taylor | 1989–1990 | |

=== Other personnel ===
| Birth name: | Ring name(s): | Tenure: | Notes |
|---|---|---|---|
| Terry Fox | Terry Fox | 1996– | Promoter |
| Eddie Sharkey | Eddie Sharkey | 1985– | Promoter |

Company name to Year
| Company name: | Years: |
|---|---|
| Pro Wrestling America | 1985–1998 |
| Wrestle America 2000 | 1998–2000 |
| Pro Wrestling America | 2000– |
Notes
^{†} Indicates they are deceased.
^{‡} Indicates they died while they were employed with Pro Wrestling America.
^{AWA} Indicates they were part of a talent exchange with the American Wrestling Association.
