= List of former American Wrestling Association personnel =

Below is a list of former members of the American Wrestling Association (AWA), an American professional wrestling organization based in Minnesota.

== AWA wrestlers ==
Deceased individuals are indicated with a dagger (†).

- Adrian Adonis^{†}
- Badd Company (Paul Diamond & Pat Tanaka)
- Ox Baker^{†}
- Blackjack Mulligan^{†}
- Bob Backlund
- Red Bastien^{†}
- Crusher Jerry Blackwell^{†}
- Nick Bockwinkel^{†}
- Dino Bravo ^{†}
- Bruiser Brody^{†}
- Jim Brunzell
- Édouard Carpentier^{†}
- Hercules Cortez^{†}
- The Crusher^{†}
- Colonel DeBeers^{†}
- Derrick Dukes
- The Destruction Crew (Mike Enos & Wayne Bloom)
- Bobby Duncum^{†}
- The Fabulous Freebirds (Michael P.S. Hayes, Terry "Bamm Bamm" Gordy^{†} & Buddy Roberts^{†})
- Juan Kachmanian a.k.a. Pampero Firpo^{†}
- Ric Flair
- Greg Gagne
- Verne Gagne^{†}
- John Paul
- Jimmy Garvin
- Ronnie Garvin
- Pepper Gomez^{†}
- "Superstar" Billy Graham^{†}
- Scott Hall^{†}
- Stan Hansen
- Lawrence Heinemi a.k.a. Larry Heinimi, Luscious Lars Anderson
- Curt Hennig^{†}
- Larry Hennig^{†}
- Horst Hoffman
- Hulk Hogan^{†}
- Don Jardine a.k.a. The Super Destroyer^{†}
- Kenny Jay a.k.a. the Sodbuster a.k.a. Capable Kenny Jay^{†}
- Sheik Adnan El Kaissey^{†}
- "Mr. Magnificent" Kevin Kelly
- Teijo Khan^{†}
- Kokina Maximus^{†}
- Steve Keirn
- Ivan Koloff^{†}
- Nikita Koloff
- Stan Kowalski^{†}, a.k.a. The Big 'K'
- Jack Lanza^{†}
- Stan Lane
- Jerry Lawler
- The Long Riders (Bill Irwin & Scott Irwin^{†})
- Jerry Lynn
- Billy Red Lyons^{†}
- Rick Martel
- Wahoo McDaniel^{†}
- Mighty Igor^{†}
- Moose Morowski^{†}
- The Ninja
- Nick Kiniski
- Robert Fuller
- Jimmy Golden
- The Nasty Boys (Brian Knobbs and Jerry Sags)
- Steve Olsonoski
- Ivan Putski
- The Rockers (Shawn Michaels & Marty Jannetty)
- Nord the Barbarian
- The Midnight Express (Dennis Condrey^{†} & Randy Rose)
- Reggie Parks^{†}
- Ken Patera
- D. J. Peterson^{†}
- Robert Gibson
- Ricky Morton
- Harley Race^{†}
- "Mr. Electricity" Steve Regal^{†}
- Brad Rheingans
- Dusty Rhodes^{†} & Dick Murdoch^{†}
- Ricky Rice
- The Road Warriors (Animal^{†} & Hawk^{†})
- Billy Robinson^{†}
- Buddy Rose^{†}
- The Russian Brute^{†}
- Masa Saito^{†}
- Akio Sato
- Dutch Savage^{†}
- David Schultz
- Sgt. Slaughter
- Superfly Snuka^{†}
- Doug Somers^{†}
- Dennis Stamp^{†}
- Ray "The Crippler" Stevens^{†}
- Chris Taylor^{†}
- Texas Hangmen (Psycho & Killer)
- The Trooper (a.k.a. The Patriot)^{†}
- Soldat Ustinov
- "Mad Dog" Vachon^{†}
- "Butcher" Vachon^{†}
- Khosrow Vaziri aka The Iron Sheik ^{†}
- Jesse Ventura
- Baron von Raschke
- Leon White^{†}
- Bill Watts
- Larry Zbyszko
- Tom Zenk^{†}
- Boris Zhukov
- Buck Zumhofe
- Tim Woods^{†}
- Man Mountain Mike^{†}
- Buddy Landel^{†}
- Bob Orton Jr.
- Tully Blanchard
- Mongolian Stomper^{†}
- Roger Kirby^{†}
- Héctor Guerrero
- Mando Guerrero
- Tommy Jammer
- J. T. Southern
- Silo Sam^{†}
- Mr. Hughes
- Tommy Rich
- Scott Norton
- Nightstalker
- B. Brian Blair
- Bobby Fulton and Jackie Fulton

== AWA/WWA wrestlers (Chicago) ==
(For many years, the AWA ran joint shows with the World Wrestling Association at the International Amphitheater in Chicago)

- Dick the Bruiser
- Reggie Lisowski (The Crusher)
- Dr X
- Ox Baker
- Moose Cholak
- Sailor Art Thomas
- Bobo Brazil
- Bob Luce (Chicago wrestling promoter)
- Sam Menacker (host of the Indianapolis-based program segments)
- Chief Don Eagle
- Prince Pullins
- Paul Christy
- Spike Huber
- Johnny Kace
- Ernie Ladd
- Pepper Gomez
- "Pretty Boy" Bobby Heenan (manager)
- Wilbur Snyder

== AWA female wrestlers ==
- Penny Banner†
- Candi Devine†
- Sherri Martel†
- Judy Martin
- Brandi Mae†
- Madusa Miceli
- Magnificent Mimi
- Wendi Richter
- Vivian Vachon†

== AWA Promoters ==
- Wally Karbo (Minneapolis)
- Joe Dusek (Omaha)
- Gene Reed (Denver)
- Bob Luce (Chicago and Indianapolis)
- Don Marxen (Moline and Davenport)
- Eddie Williams (St. Paul)
- Buddy Lee Cliff (Rockford)
- Ben Sternberg (Rochester, Minnesota)
- Alexander Turk (Winnipeg) (1961-1962)
- John "Cyclone" Macalpine (Winnipeg) (1962-1964)
- John Guglyn (Winnipeg)
- Al Tomko (Winnipeg) (1966-1979)
- Don Brinton (Winnipeg) (1979-1986)
- Dwaine Hoberg (Fargo-Moorhead)
- Dennis Hilgart (Milwaukee)
- Ed Francis (Hawaii)
- Ed Tracy (Cedar Rapids/Waterloo)
- Jack Berry (Madison, Wisconsin)
- John Olsen (Salt Lake City)
- Leo Nomellini (San Francisco/Oakland)
- Harvey Solon (Duluth, Minnesota)
- Al DeRusha (Smaller towns in Minnesota)
- Frank Carson (Peoria)
- Lloyd Bolkcom (River towns in Illinois and Iowa)

== Other notable AWA contributors ==
- Eric Bischoff (interviewer)
- Stanley Blackburn (on-air president)^{†}
- Lord James Blears (wrestler/commentator)^{†}
- Gary DeRusha (referee)
- "Scrap Iron" George Gadaski (wrestler/referee)^{†}
- Donna Gagne (ring announcer)
- Paul E. Dangerously (manager)
- Lord Alfred Hayes (manager)^{†}
- Bobby Heenan (manager)^{†}
- Dick Jonkowski (ring announcer/commentator)
- Rodger Kent (ringside announcer)^{†}
- Scott LeDoux (referee)^{†}
- Lee Marshall (announcer/commentator)^{†}
- Marty Miller (referee)
- Joe Fiorino (referee mostly in Winnipeg, Manitoba)
- Larry Nelson (interviewer/ring announcer/commentator)^{†}
- Marty O'Neil (interviewer/commentator)^{†}
- Gene Okerlund (interviewer)^{†}
- Diamond Dallas Page (manager)
- Ken Resnick (interviewer/commentator)
- Ralph Strangis (commentator/ring announcer)
- Rod Trongard (commentator)^{†}
- Chuck Svendsen (referee)^{†}
