= Wellington Wilkins Jr. =

Canadian professional wrestler

Personal information
- Born: 31 July 1964 (age 61) Canada

Professional wrestling career
- Ring name(s): Wellington Wilkins Jr. Wellington Wilkens; WD Wellington; Shark Machine; Beef Wellington; Wee Willie Wilkens
- Billed height: 5"9
- Billed weight: 242 lb (110 kg)
- Debut: January 19, 1986
- Retired: 2003

Wellington Wilkins (born January 8, 1960) is a retired Canadian professional wrestler who wrestled for Michinoku Pro Wrestling in the 1990s.

== Professional wrestling career ==
Wellington Wilkins, Jr. made his professional wrestling debut on January 19, 1986 for Jim Crockett Promotions at a World Championship Wrestling TV taping at the WTBS Studios in Atlanta, where he lost a singles match to Bobby Eaton, which would air six days later on January 25. Before the show, he requested to booker Dusty Rhodes to be named Blue Thunder. Rhodes refused and decided to name him Wee Willie Wilkens.

On March 23, 1986, he and Eaton met again at another World Championship Wrestling TV taping at WTBS Studios, this time with Eaton teaming up with Dennis Condrey as the Midnight Express against Wilkens and Phil Brown; the match would air six days later on March 29. Throughout the match, Wilkins was showing too much offense and refusing to sell for both Condrey and Eaton, which led the Midnight Express to throw legit strikes to Wilkins. The Midnight Express won the match, but after the match, Wilkins kicked Eaton from behind, while on his back, which led to Condrey, Eaton and Jim Cornette beat the hell out of him (TBS edited out the post-match beatdown for broadcast). After the show, Rhodes confronted him, before firing him on the spot.

From 1987 to 1988, he worked as a jobber for the World Wrestling Federation.

In 1990, he made his debut in Japan for Universal Wrestling Federation (Japan) until the promotion shut down in October 1990. He would then debut for the newly Super World of Sports and Pro Wrestling Fujiwara Gumi in 1991 and 1992.

Wilkins would then work for Michinoku Pro Wrestling in 1993 where he spent most of his career there. He won the PWA Heavyweight Championship defeating the Hater on August 25, 1996 in Sendai, Miyagi, Japan. He retained the title against Lenny Lane on October 10, 1996 at Michinoku Pro Takewaki -These Days- in Tokyo.

In 1997, Wilkins made an appearance for Extreme Championship Wrestling defeating Lenny Lane.

He returned for one night for the World Wrestling Federation on April 25, 1998 when he defeated The Executioner in a dark match for Shotgun Saturday Night.

Wilkins wrestled his last match as Beef Wellington on November 2, 2003 against Yone Genjin in a double count out at Michinoku Pro 10th Anniversary Last Chapter in Tokyo.

== Other media ==
In 1997, he appeared in the video game WCW vs. nWo World Tour as "Shaman".

== Championships and accomplishments ==
- Pro Wrestling America
  - PWA Heavyweight Championship (1 time)
