= PWA Iron Horse Television Championship =

Professional wrestling championship

Details
- Promotion: Pro Wrestling America
- Date established: January 15, 1985
- Date retired: 1990
Statistics
- First champion(s): Danny Gage
- Final champion(s): The Lightning Kid (won April 20, 1990)
- Most reigns: Derrick Dukes (3)
- Longest reign: Danny Gage (532 days)
- Shortest reign: Derrick Dukes (13 days)

The PWA Iron Horse Television Championship was a professional wrestling secondary championship in Pro Wrestling America (PWA). It remained active until 1990 when the title was abandoned.

The inaugural champion was Danny Gage, who defeated Mohammed Abass in Anoka, Minnesota on January 15, 1985, to become the first PWA Iron Horse Television Champion. Derrick Dukes holds the record for most reigns, with three. At 532 days, Danny Gage's first and only reign is the longest in the title's history. Derrick Dukes's third reign was the shortest in the history of the title lasting 13 days. Overall, there have been 10 reigns shared between eight wrestlers, with two vacancies, and one deactivation.

== Title history ==
Key

#	Order in reign history
Reign	The reign number for the specific set of wrestlers listed
Event	The event in which the title was won
—	Used for vacated reigns so as not to count it as an official reign
N/A	The information is not available or is unknown
+	Indicates the current reign is changing daily

=== Reigns ===
#	Wrestlers	Reign	Date	Days held	Location	Event	Notes	Ref.
1	Danny Gage	1	January 15, 1985	532	Anoka, Minnesota	Live event	Gage defeated Mohammed Abass to become the first PWA Iron Horse Television Champion.	
—	Vacated	—	July 1, 1986	—	N/A	N/A	The championship is vacated when Gage leaves the territory.	
2	Derrick Dukes	1	July 4, 1986	498	N/A	Live event	Dukes defeated Soldat Ustinov to win the vacant championship.	
3	Skip Luthor	1	November 14, 1987	90	Thief River Falls, Minnesota	Live event		
4	Derrick Dukes	2	February 12, 1988	25	Winnipeg, Manitoba	Live event		
5	Matt Derringer	1	March 8, 1988	243	Winnipeg, Manitoba	Live event		
6	Tommy Ferrera	1	November 6, 1988	230	New Ulm, Minnesota	Live event		
—	Vacated	—	June 24, 1989	—	N/A	N/A	The championship is vacated when Tommy Ferrera is unable to defend the title due to a shoulder injury.	
7	Randy Gusto	1	February 25, 1999	63	Fridley, Minnesota	Live event	Gusto defeated King Tut to win the vacant title.	
8	J.W. Storm	1	September 13, 1989	204	Fridley, Minnesota	Live event		
—	Vacated	—	1990	—	N/A	N/A	The championship is vacated when Storm jumps to the National Wrestling Alliance.	
9	Derrick Dukes	3	April 7, 1990	13	Hinckley, Minnesota	Live event	Dukes defeated Ricky Rice to win the vacant title.	
10	The Lightning Kid	1	April 20, 1990	N/A	Mora, Minnesota	Live event		
—	Deactivated	—	1990	—	N/A	N/A	The title was subsequently abandoned.	

== List of combined reigns ==
<1	Indicates that the reign lasted less than one day.

Rank (Note: Each reign is ranked highest to lowest; reigns with the same number mean that they are tied for that certain rank.)	Wrestler	# of reigns	Combined days
1	Derrick Dukes	3	536
2	Danny Gage	1	532
3	Matt Derringer	1	243
4	Tommy Ferrera	1	230
5	J.W. Storm	1	204
6	Skip Luthor	1	90
7	Randy Gusto	1	63
