= PWA Tag Team Championship (Minnesota) =

Professional wrestling tag team championship

Details
- Promotion: Pro Wrestling America
- Date established: January 15, 1985
- Date retired: 1996
Statistics
- First champion: The Terminators
- Final champions: Thunderblood (Charlie Norris and Derrick Dukes) (won 1996)
- Most reigns: The Terminators (Riggs and Wolf) (3)
- Longest reign: The Terminators (609 days)
- Shortest reign: The Terminators (2 days)

The PWA Tag Team Championship was a professional wrestling tag team championship in Pro Wrestling America (PWA). It remained active until 1996 when PWA began running occasional events.

The inaugural champions were The Terminators (Riggs and Wolf), who defeated The Warlord and Teijo Khan in Anoka, Minnesota on January 15, 1985 to become the first PWA Tag Team Champions. At 609 days, The Terminators' second reign was the longest while the team's third and final reign was the shortest lasting only 2 days. With three reigns, The Terminators also held the most reigns as a tag team and individually. Overall, there were 19 reigns.

== Title history ==
Key

#	Order in reign history
Reign	The reign number for the specific set of wrestlers listed
Event	The event in which the title was won
—	Used for vacated reigns so as not to count it as an official reign
N/A	The information is not available or is unknown
+	Indicates the current reign is changing daily

=== Reigns ===
#	Wrestlers	Reign	Date	Days held	Location	Event	Notes	Ref.
1	The Terminators (Riggs and Wolf)	1	January 15, 1985	92	Anoka, Minnesota	Live event	Riggs and Wolf defeated The Warlord and Teijo Khan to become the first PWA Tag Team Champions; may have defeated Mad Dog Vachon and Jim Gagnon in River Falls, Wisconsin.	
2	Miami Vice Defenders (Savannah Jack and Ed Roberts)	1	April 17, 1985	176	Barron, Wisconsin	Live event		
3	The Terminators	2	October 10, 1985	609	Somerset, Wisconsin	Live event		
4	Top Guns (Ricky Rice and Derrick Dukes)	1	June 11, 1987	64	Minneapolis, Minnesota	Live event		
5	The Terminators	3	August 14, 1987	2	Winnipeg, Manitoba	Live event		
6	The Fantastics (Tommy Rogers and Bobby Fulton)	1	August 16, 1987	N/A	Fridley, Minnesota	Live event		
—	Vacated	—	1987	—	N/A	N/A	The championship is vacated when The Fantastics leave the territory.	
7	Johnny Love and Tommy Ferrera	1	November 16, 1987	485	Fridley, Minnesota	Live event	Love and Ferrera defeated The Masked Maniacs to win the vacant title.	
8	Matt and Bret Derringer	1	March 15, 1989	101	Fridley, Minnesota	Live event		
9	Maximum Overdrive (Hunter and Silencer)	1	June 24, 1989	450	Minneapolis, Minnesota	Live event		
10	The Steiner Brothers (Rick and Scott Steiner)	1	September 17, 1990	14	Atlanta, Georgia	Live event	This match occurred at World Championship Wrestling on September 5 during Clash of The Champions 12, aired September 17 in PWA television; it was not billed as a title bout in WCW, but billed as such in PWA.	
—	Vacated	—	October 1, 1990	—	N/A	N/A	The championship is vacated due to absence, even though the Steiners were not aware that they were champions.	
11	The Punishers (Sledge and Hammer)	1	April 11, 1991	262	Stillwater, Minnesota	Live event	Sledge and Hammer defeated The Wild Boys (Tim Hunt and Steve Berg) to win the vacant title.	
12	Baron von Raschke and Ken Patera	1	December 29, 1991	6	St. Paul, Minnesota	Live event		
13	The Punishers	2	January 4, 1992	21	N/A	Live event	Awarded title.	
14	Baron von Raschke and Brad Rheingans	1	January 25, 1992	N/A	Annandale, Minnesota	Live event		
—	N/A	—	N/A	—	N/A	N/A		
15	The Lightning Kid and Jerry Lynn	1	March 2, 1993	N/A	Fridley, Minnesota	Live event	Defeated Tony Denucci and Tommy Ferrera.	
—	N/A	—	N/A	—	N/A	N/A		
16	The Storm Troopers (Storm Trooper I and Storm Trooper II)	1	N/A (prior to June 1994)	N/A	N/A	N/A		
17	Charlie Norris and Sam Houston	1	August 15, 1994	N/A	Red Lake, Minnesota	Live event		
18	The Storm Troopers	2	N/A (prior to August 1995)	N/A	N/A	N/A		
19	Thunderblood (Charlie Norris and Derrick Dukes)	1	N/A (prior to June 1996)	N/A	N/A	N/A		
—	Deactivated	—	1996	—	N/A	N/A	PWA began running occasional events after 1996 and the title was eventually abandoned.	

== List of combined reigns ==
<1	Indicates that the reign lasted less than one day.

Rank (Note: Each reign is ranked highest to lowest; reigns with the same number mean that they are tied for that certain rank.)	Wrestler	# of reigns	Combined days
1	Riggs and Wolf (The Terminator)	3	995
2	Johnny Love and Tommy Ferrera	1	485
3	Hunter and Silencer (Maximum Overdrive)	1	450
4	Sledge and Hammer (The Punishers)	2	273
5	Savannah Jack and Ed Roberts (Miami Vice Defenders)	1	176
6	Matt and Bret Derringer	1	101
7	Ricky Rice and Derrick Dukes (Top Guns)	1	64
8	Rick and Scott Steiner (The Steiner Brothers)	1	14
9	Baron von Raschke and Ken Patera	1	6
