= Kenny Jay =

American wrestler (1937–2023)

Personal information
- Born: Kenneth John Benkowski; March 27, 1937 Holdingford, Minnesota, U.S.
- Died: February 2, 2023 (aged 85) Bloomington, Minnesota

Professional wrestling career
- Ring name: Kenny Jay
- Billed height: 6 ft 3 in (1.91 m)
- Billed weight: 275 lb (125 kg)
- Billed from: Minnesota; Cleveland, Ohio
- Trained by: Verne Gagne; Bob Hawkins
- Debut: 1958
- Retired: 2012

Kenneth John Benkowski (March 27, 1937 – February 2, 2023), better known by his ring name, Kenny "Sodbuster" Jay, was an American professional wrestler, best known for his appearances with the American Wrestling Association.

Jay primarily performed as a jobber. He was often paired with fellow AWA jobber Jake "The Milkman" Milliman in tag team matches. During his career, he was known for his stiff wrestling style.

== Early life ==
Kenny Jay was born on March 27, 1937, in Holdingford, Minnesota. Kenny was a natural athlete in high school, lettering in both football and shot put. When he graduated from high school in 1955, he moved to Milwaukee, Wisconsin, where he found employment as a factory worker.

== Professional wrestling career ==
=== Early career; military service ===
His first match was at the Southside Armory for John Hinds. Before long he was working larger venues at the Marigold Arena in Chicago. His wrestling career took a hiatus when he joined the U.S. Army for a two-year stint.

=== American Wrestling Association (1962–1985, 1990) ===
After his military tour, he found employment with the American Wrestling Association (AWA), wrestling every Saturday's television taping and then house shows during the week for promoter Wally Karbo.

Whenever a new name would come in, they would give them to Jay to make them look good. He used his mat-based scientific wrestling style with the likes of Mad Dog Vachon, The Crusher, Verne Gagne, Jesse The Body Ventura, Jerry Blackwell, Bobby Heenan, Mr. Saito, and Bruiser Brody.

To help pay the bills, Jay started his own landscape business, which is where he got the "Sodbuster" nickname. He never left the Midwest, as he was rooted in the area with his landscape business, wife, and three children.

Kenny Jay is the best overall talent in wrestling. He was what we called a 'job guy' or 'jobber' but he could work with any human being and get a good match out of them. He would go in the ring with a big name who really couldn't do much and make him look good, and he could get in there with a Danny Hodge or Verne Gagne and make them look even better than they were. He was just an incredibly talented guy.

— Harley Race

Early career highlights included several overseas trips to Japan, beginning in 1972, where he worked 18 matches (including five cage matches), winning most of them. Later in 1976 he took on Muhammad Ali in a boxer vs wrestler bout that also featured Verne Gagne as the Referee, a match Kenny Jay considered one of the high points of his career.

In the late 1970s Jay teamed with George Gadaski. In 1984 The Sodbuster also appeared as a tag-team partner with legendary wrestler Baron Von Raschke.

In 1985 he retired from wrestling. He came out of retirement in 1990.

Jay continued working for the AWA for nearly thirty years until they went out of business in 1991.

=== Later career (1990–2012) ===
Jay later wrestled in North Premier Wrestling with J.B. Trask, Lenny Lane, Jerry Lynn, "Mr. Everything" Dan Jesser and his enemy the Texas Badman. Jay occasionally wrestled for several promotions in the 1990s and 2000s primarily appearing in the State of Minnesota. He wrestled his last match in 2012 at 75 years old.

In 2005 the Cauliflower Alley Club board of directors unanimously chose Kenny Jay to be honored.

Being the first jabroni to be honored by the Cauliflower Alley Club is real exciting. It's nice to be recognized by the boys.

— Kenny Jay

=== Death ===
On February 2, 2023, it was announced that Jay had died at the age of 85.

== Championships and accomplishments ==
- American Wrestling Association Champion
  - Other honoree (2005)
