= Larry Cameron =

American professional wrestler, football player (1952-1993)

Personal information
- Born: November 4, 1952 Natchez, Mississippi, US
- Died: December 13, 1993 (aged 41) Bremen, Germany

Professional wrestling career
- Ring name(s): Larry Cameron; Lethal Larry; Butcher
- Billed height: 1.84 m (6 ft 1/2 in)
- Billed weight: 127 kg (280 lb)
- Billed from: Harlem, New York; Chicago, Illinois; Minneapolis, Minnesota
- Trained by: Eddie Sharkey; Stu Hart
- Debut: 1986

Larry Cameron (November 4, 1952 – December 13, 1993) was an American professional football player and professional wrestler.

Cameron played football as a linebacker at Alcorn State University before playing professionally in the Canadian Football League (CFL) with the BC Lions and Ottawa Rough Riders, with whom he was a Grey Cup champion. He switched to professional wrestling in 1986 and competed for Stampede Wrestling, where he won the Stampede North American Heavyweight Championship, and the Catch Wrestling Association (CWA), where he won the CWA World Tag Team Championship twice with Mad Bull Buster. He died of a heart attack during a match in December 1993.

== Football career ==
Larry Cameron
Profile
- Position: Linebacker

Personal information
- Listed height: 6 ft 2 in (1.88 m)
- Listed weight: 225 lb (102 kg)

Career information
- College: Alcorn State
- NFL draft: 1974: 12 / Pick 301st round

Career history
- 1975: BC Lions
- 1975–1977: Ottawa Rough Riders

Awards and highlights
- Grey Cup champion (1976); CFL All-Star (1975); 2× CFL East All-Star (1975, 1976); Jackie Parker Trophy (1975)

Larry Cameron was born on November 4, 1952, the youngest of seven children. He played football as a linebacker at Alcorn State University, earning four letters from 1970 to 1973. He was chosen in the 12th round with the 301st overall pick in the 1974 NFL draft by the Denver Broncos. Cameron then played for the BC Lions and Ottawa Rough Riders in the Canadian Football League (CFL), winning the Grey Cup with the latter in 1976. He also briefly played with the Montreal Alouettes. After leaving football, he developed an interest in bodybuilding and won the titles of Mr. Minnesota and Mr. Northern Country in 1985.

== Professional wrestling career ==
=== Early career (1986–1989) ===
After meeting Eddie Sharkey, Cameron trained with Sharkey for a professional wrestling career and began working for his promotion, Pro Wrestling America. He wrestled his first match in 1986 against a wrestler named Johnny Love at a nightclub in Fridley, Minnesota. Cameron won his first championship on September 12, 1987, defeating Ricky Rice for the PWA Heavyweight Championship. He successfully defended the title against the likes of Love, Tom Zenk and Tommy Jammer, before losing it back to Rice on July 8, 1989. He also wrestled for Windy City Pro Wrestling, where he was managed by Paul E Dangerously.

=== Stampede Wrestling (1988–1989) ===
In December 1988, Cameron made his debut for Stampede Wrestling, defeating Tommy Ferrara. He was involved in a major feud with Davey Boy Smith, whom he believed received preferential treatment for being the son-in-law of Stu Hart. Cameron also feuded with the likes of Chris Benoit, Don Muraco and Owen Hart. On April 28, 1989, he defeated Smith to win the Stampede North American Heavyweight Championship. Cameron held onto the title until Stampede closed in December 1989.

=== New Japan Pro-Wrestling (1990, 1992) ===
He made his debut for New Japan Pro-Wrestling (NJPW) in March 1990 as part of the "Big Fight Series" tour, teaming with the likes of Scott Hall and Bam Bam Bigelow against the teams of Hiroshi Hase and Kuniaki Kobayashi, Riki Choshu and Shinya Hashimoto, and Kengo Kimura and Osamu Kido. He returned in April 1992 for the "Explosion Tour", this time with Scott Norton and Tony Halme as his tag team partners.

=== World Championship Wrestling (1990) ===
Cameron signed a one-year deal with World Championship Wrestling (WCW) on May 16, 1990. On December 3, managed by Teddy Long, Cameron defeated Ray Hammer for a taping of the January 12, 1991 episode of WCW WorldWide, which was his only televised appearance. For the rest of 1990, he served as a part-time member of Doom (consisting of WCW World Tag Team Champions Butch Reed and Ron Simmons), making six additional appearances at house shows, each time teaming with Reed in a loss to Ric Flair and Arn Anderson of The Four Horsemen.

=== Catch Wrestling Association (1991–1993) ===
In 1991, Cameron began wrestling exclusively for Otto Wanz's promotion, Catch Wrestling Association (CWA). On July 11, 1992, Cameron and Mad Bull Buster defeated Mile Zrno and Steve Regal to win the vacant CWA World Tag Team Championship. On December 19, they successfully defended the titles against Regal and Derrick Dukes at the Euro Catch Festival. Cameron and Buster lost the titles on July 18, 1993, to Dave Taylor and Zrno, but regained them on October 24.

== Death ==
On December 13, 1993, Cameron suffered a heart attack during a match with Tony St. Clair in Bremen and died backstage at the age of 41. He reportedly suffered from heart problems, at one point being stopped from wrestling at an independent show due to an irregular heartbeat. A benefit show was held on December 27 for Cameron's body to be brought back to the United States. At the time of his death, Cameron had been planning to retire from professional wrestling to open a gym for kids. The CWA World Tag Team Championship was vacated following his death.

== Championships and accomplishments ==
- Catch Wrestling Association
  - CWA World Tag Team Championship (2 times) with Mad Bull Buster
- International Wrestling Association
  - IWA Heavyweight Championship (1 time)
- Pro Wrestling America
  - PWA Heavyweight Championship (1 time)
- Pro Wrestling Illustrated
  - PWI ranked him #103 of the 500 best singles wrestlers of the year in the PWI 500 in 1991
  - PWI ranked him #327 of the Top 500 Singles Wrestlers of the "PWI Years" in 2003
- Stampede Wrestling
  - Stampede North American Heavyweight Championship (1 time)
  - Stampede Wrestling Hall of Fame (Class of 1995)

== See also ==
- List of premature professional wrestling deaths
- List of gridiron football players who became professional wrestlers
