= Tommy Jammer =

American retired professional wrestler

Professional wrestling career
- Ring name(s): Nutri Rockne; Tommy Jammer; Tommy Ventura; Tom Walsh; California Kid
- Billed height: 6 ft 2 in (188 cm)
- Billed weight: 240 lb (109 kg)
- Billed from: San Diego, California, United States
- Trained by: Eddie Sharkey
- Debut: 1989
- Retired: 1994

Tommy Jammer is an American retired professional wrestler. He is best known for his appearances with the American Wrestling Association from 1989 to 1990.

== Professional wrestling career ==
=== American Wrestling Association (1989–1990) ===
Trained by Eddie Sharkey during the mid-1980s, he was one of several wrestlers as part of a talent exchange agreement between Sharkey and AWA promoter Greg Gagne to make his debut in the last years of the AWA. Participating in a 17-man Battle Royal to crown a new AWA World Heavyweight Champion in St. Paul, Minnesota on February 7, 1989, Jammer was the first man to be eliminated.

He did, however, score one of his first victories in the promotion defeating Mike Enos almost two weeks later in Marshfield, Wisconsin on February 18 and, in a tag team match with Derrick Dukes, defeated Badd Company resulting in Pat Tanaka and Paul Diamond splitting up in Rochester, Minnesota on May 6, 1989.

Feuding with Jonnie Stewart during his early months in the promotion, he defeated Stewart at AWA War in the Windy City on June 23 and was later scheduled to face him at the CNE Coliseum in Toronto, Ontario, Canada on December 6 although Paul Diamond substituted him when he was unable to make the event.

During the next year, Jammer appeared on several AWA supercards losing to Tully Blanchard at SuperClash 4 on April 8 and wrestled in numerous matches as part of Baron von Raschke's "Baron's Blitzers" during the Team Challenge Series, eventually facing "Larry's Legends" (Destruction Crew and The Texas Hangmen) in an eight-man "Behind the 8-Ball" tag team elimination match on September 10, 1990. He would also feud with AWA World Heavyweight Champion Larry Zbyszko before he left the promotion in December 1990. Jammer would wrestle his last match with the AWA in Bloomington, Minnesota losing to Larry Cameron on May 3, 1991.

=== Independent circuit (1990–1994) ===
Like many other AWA wrestlers, Jammer began to wrestle with the Minneapolis-based Pro Wrestling America after the AWA folded in 1990. He continued to wrestle in the Minnesota area during the early 1990s, winning the NSW Tag team titles with Baron von Raschke, although he would eventually retire by the end of 1994.

== Championships and accomplishments ==
- NCWA
  - NCWA Heavyweight Championship (1 time)
- NSW
  - NSW Tag Team Championship (1 time) – with Baron von Raschke
- Pro Wrestling Illustrated
  - PWI ranked him # 196 of the 500 best singles wrestlers of the PWI 500 in 1991
