= PWA Light Heavyweight Championship =

Professional wrestling championship

Details
- Promotion: Pro Wrestling America
- Date established: January 15, 1985
- Date retired: 1992
Statistics
- First champion: Steve Regal
- Final champions: Jerry Lynn (won December 27, 1991)
- Most reigns: Jerry Lynn (3)
- Longest reign: Tommy Ferrera (1,183 days)
- Shortest reign: Matt Derringer (8 days)

The PWA Light Heavyweight Championship was a professional wrestling light heavyweight championship in Pro Wrestling America (PWA). It remained active until 1992 when the title was abandoned.

The inaugural champion was "Mr. Electricity" Steve Regal, the then reigning AWA World Junior Heavyweight Champion, who was billed as the first PWA Light Heavyweight Champion upon his arrival in the promotion in January 1985. Jerry Lynn holds the record for most reigns, with three. At an estimated 1,183 days, Tommy Ferrera's first reign is the longest in the title's history. Matt Derringer's second reign was the shortest in the history of the title lasting 8 days. Overall, there have been 12 reigns shared between 7 wrestlers, with four vacancies, and 1 deactivation.

== Title history ==
Key

#	Order in reign history
Reign	The reign number for the specific set of wrestlers listed
Event	The event in which the title was won
—	Used for vacated reigns so as not to count it as an official reign
N/A	The information is not available or is unknown
+	Indicates the current reign is changing daily

=== Reigns ===
#	Wrestlers	Reign	Date	Days held	Location	Event	Notes	Ref.
1	Steve Regal	1	January 15, 1985	N/A	N/A	Live event	Regal was then the reigning AWA World Junior Heavyweight Champion and billed as champion upon his arrival in the promotion.	
—	Vacated	—	N/A	—	N/A	N/A		
2	Tommy Ferrera	1	March 6, 1986	N/A	Coon Rapids, Minnesota	Live event	Ferrera defeated The Outpatient to win the vacant championship.	
—	Vacated	—	June 1989	—	N/A	N/A		
3	Johnny Love	1	June 24, 1989	214	Minneapolis, Minnesota	Live event	Love defeated Anthony Wright to win the vacant championship.	
4	Jerry Lynn	1	January 24, 1990	51	Red Wing, Minnesota	Live event		
5	Matt Derringer	1	March 16, 1990	27	Hastings, Minnesota	Live event		
6	The Lightning Kid	1	April 12, 1990	24	Fridley, Minnesota	Live event		
7	Matt Derringer	2	May 6, 1990	8	Barron, Wisconsin	Live event		
8	Tommy Ferrera	2	May 14, 1990	N/A	Fridley, Minnesota	Live event		
—	Vacated	—	N/A	—	N/A	N/A	The championship is vacated when Tommy Ferrera is unable to defend the title due to a shoulder injury.	
9	Jerry Lynn	2	January 14, 1991	84	Fridley, Minnesota	Live event	Lynn defeated The Lightning Kid to win the vacant title.	
10	The Lightning Kid	2	April 8, 1991	223	Fridley, Minnesota	Live event		
11	Ricky Rice	1	November 17, 1991	N/A	Minneapolis, Minnesota	Live event		
—	Vacated	—	December 1991	—	N/A	N/A		
12	Jerry Lynn	3	December 27, 1991	N/A	Dallas, Texas	Live event	Lynn defeated The Lightning Kid to win the vacant title. This was at a Global Wrestling Federation event.	
—	Deactivated	—	1992	—	N/A	N/A	The title was abandoned.	

== List of combined reigns ==
Rank (Note: Each reign is ranked highest to lowest; reigns with the same number mean that they are tied for that certain rank.)	Wrestler	# of reigns	Combined days
1	Tommy Ferrera	1	1,183 (est.)
2	The Lightning Kid	2	247
3	Johnny Love	1	214
4	Jerry Lynn	3	135
5	Matt Derringer	2	35
6	Ricky Rice	3	14 (est.)
