= Alex Pourteau =

American professional wrestler

Personal information
- Born: Alexander Pourteau; October 30, 1969 (age 56) Bossier City, Louisiana, U.S.

Professional wrestling career
- Ring name(s): Alex Pourteau; Beach Bully; Custom Made Crippler; Heartbreaker Apollo; The Pug
- Billed height: 5 ft 11 in (1.80 m)
- Billed weight: 227 lb (103 kg; 16.2 st)
- Billed from: New Orleans, Louisiana
- Trained by: Jim Star; Skandor Akbar
- Debut: December 17, 1987
- Retired: 2018

Alexander Pourteau, (born October 30, 1969) is an American professional wrestler best known for his stint with the World Wrestling Federation as Alex "The Pug" Pourteau between 1996 and 1997.

== Professional wrestling career ==
=== Early career (1987–1990) ===
Alex Pourteau was trained by Jim Star and Skandor Akbar, before he began to wrestle for World Class Championship Wrestling between 1988 and 1989. Although Pourteau won no championship gold he did get a break under the tutelage of Skandor Akbar. After wrestling for WCCW in Dallas, Texas; Pourteau left WCCW for both the United States Wrestling Association and World Championship Wrestling in 1989 Pourteau remained with both for one year, leaving in 1990. Pourteau again did not win championship gold and in 1991 began wrestling for World Wrestling Council in Puerto Rico and the Global Wrestling Federation.

=== GWF, Puerto Rico and Japan (1991–1995) ===
Pourteau, working for the GWF, won their Global Wrestling Federation Light Heavyweight Championship on four occasions. His first reign began on July 31, 1992, when he defeated Terry Simms. He would lose the title to Mike Dahl on October 23, 1991; after winning the World Wrestling Council World Junior Heavyweight Championship.

Pourteau then went on tour with World Wrestling Council and whilst on the tour won the World Wrestling Council World Junior Heavyweight Championship by defeating Ricky Santana on September 4, 1991. He lost the title on September 21 of the same year and returned to the GWF. He did not return to World Wrestling Council following the tour.

After returning to the Global Wrestling Federation, he again won the GWF Light Heavyweight Championship on January 22, 1993, by defeating Mike Dahl. Pourteau lost the title to Calvin Knapp but won the championship a third time after defeating Steven Dane after Knapp had vacated the title. On February 20, 1994, he lost the title, once again to Knapp, whom he defeated for the championship in August 1994 in Guatemala. Later in the same month, Pourteau lost the championship to Osamu Nishimura, with the GWF closing in September 1994. Pourteau also began teaming with Shawn Summers, in a tag team known as the Beach Bullies, although the team had no championship success.

Pourteau had also begun to wrestle for Network of Wrestling in Japan for two years, beginning in 1993 and ending in 1995. Pourteau, whilst wrestling for the company, had no championship success.

=== World Wrestling Federation (1996–1997) ===
Pourteau made his debut in the World Wrestling Federation wrestling a dark match at a WWF Superstars taping on March 10, 1996, in Corpus Christi, TX when he teamed with Rod Price to face Devon Michaels & Bo Vegas (who would later sign with WCW as High Voltage). Later that spring, faced with an expanding WCW and their own limited talent pool Jim Cornette suggested that a number of free agent wrestlers be brought in to flesh out the WWF roster. This ultimately led to the signing of Tracy Smothers, Tony Anthony, Bill Irwin, Tom Brandi, and Porteau. All but Porteau were given new names, and Porteau was given the nickname "The Pug" and the gimmick of an amateur wrestler (using the theme song The Steiner Brothers used in the WWF). He made his debut on the main roster on June 25, 1996 at a WWF Superstars taping in LaCrosse, WI and defeated Barry Horowitz in a dark match; he also beat Horowitz at the same taping for a match that aired on July 13. Porteau followed this with another victory on July 27 on Superstars, this time against Timothy Flowers. On August 10, 1996, he sustained his first defeat when he lost to Vader in a handicap match. This was followed by a loss to Mankind on the Sep 6, 1996 episode of Monday Night Raw.

Porteau began wrestling on the house show circuit, falling to Who (Jim Neidhart) on September 12, 1996 in Miami, FL. On television he rebounded when he teamed with Bob Holly to defeat WWF World Tag Team Champions The Smoking Gunns in a non-title match on the September 16th edition of RAW. The Gunns would defeat Holly & Porteau in a rematch on the Sep 22, 1996 episode of WWF Superstars. His push would fade afterwards, as he would lose to The Sultan, Goldust, Owen Hart, Davey Boy Smith, Triple H and Faarooq. His last match came on February 27, 1997 when he teamed with Holly to face Doug Furnas & Phil LaFon in Halle, Germany.

=== World Championship Wrestling (1997–1998) ===
Pourteau joined WCW later that year, making his debut on October 9, 1997, at a WCW Pro taping in a match against Joey Maggs (airing on November 16). The next day he appeared at another Pro taping in Orlando, FL, this time facing Billy Kidman. In 1998 he would appear on WorldWide, wrestling High Voltage, Alex Wright, and Fit Finlay.

=== Later career (1998–2018) ===
In 2000, Porteau would go to Japan to work for Frontier Martial-Arts Wrestling. He then wrestled on the independent wrestling circuit. Pourteau has wrestled for independent companies including Full Impact Pro. In 2001 he returned to World Wrestling Council, winning their Television Championship on July 7. He lost the championship on July 28, 2001, to Chris Grant.

Pourteau, at unknown periods of his career, has also won the CWA (Dallas) Tag Team Championship, BDPW (Dallas) Heavyweight Championship, TAP (Texas) Heavyweight Championship and the SECW Tag Team Championship (with Frankie Lancaster).

At WrestleMania XXV, Pourteau participated as a member of John Cena's "army."

His most recent match was in 2018.

== Championships and accomplishments ==
- Big D Wrestling
  - Big D Heavyweight Championship (1 time)
  - Big D Light Heavyweight Championship (1 time)
- Coastal Championship Wrestling
  - CCW Heavyweight Championship (1 time)
- Florida Wrestling Alliance
  - FWA Heavyweight Championship (1 time)
- Global Wrestling Federation
  - GWF Light Heavyweight Championship (4 times)
- South Eastern Championship Wrestling
  - SECW Tag Team Championship (1 time) – with Frankie Lancaster
- Texas All-Pro Wrestling
  - TAP Heavyweight Championship (1 time)
- World Wrestling Council
  - WWC World Junior Heavyweight Championship (1 time)
  - WWC World Television Championship (2 times)
- Other titles
  - CWA Tag Team Championship (1 time)
