= J. W. Storm =

American professional wrestler

Personal information
- Born: Jeffrey Warner; September 9, 1965 (age 61) Minneapolis, Minnesota, United States

Professional wrestling career
- Ring name(s): Agent Storm; Big Juice; J. W. Storm; Silencer
- Billed height: 6 ft 5 in (1.96 m)
- Billed weight: 290 lb (130 kg)
- Billed from: Los Angeles, California
- Debut: 1989
- Retired: c. 1999

Jeffrey Warner (born September 9, 1965) is a retired American professional wrestler and boxer best known by the ring name J. W. Storm.

Storm worked for World Championship Wrestling most notably, as a member of the tag team Maximum Overdrive with Tim Hunt. He also had stints in Pacific Northwest Wrestling and Pro Wrestling America, winning the tag team championships in both promotions.

== Professional wrestling career ==
=== Early career ===
Warner started wrestling in 1989 in the NWA's Pacific Northwest territory. He formed a tag team with Art Barr who was using a "Beetlejuice" gimmick called "The Juice Patrol" with Warner becoming "Big Juice". They feuded with Ricky Santana and Curtis Thompson, who formed the tag team "U.S. Male", until Warner was forced to leave the promotion in a "loser leaves town" match on June 30, 1990.

Warner also wrestled in Pro Wrestling America during the late-80s and early-90s and won the tag team titles as one half of Maximum Overdrive with Tim Hunt defeating Matt Derringer and Bret Derringer on June 24, 1989. Holding the titles for nearly a year, they finally lost them to the Steiner Brothers in Atlanta, Georgia on September 17, 1990. Warner, who had previously won the PWA Iron Horse Television title on April 5, 1990, would continue defending the title before jumping to the National Wrestling Alliance in June.

On April 15, 1989 Warner and Hunt received a tryout with World Championship Wrestling, defeating The Tokyo Bullets in Chicago, Illinois.

=== World Championship Wrestling (1990) ===
On the August 24, 1990 episode of WCW's Power Hour, an announcement was made about the forthcoming Clash of the Champions XII that stated that the then NWA/WCW U.S. Tag Team Champions Steiner Brothers would be facing one of three new tag-teams set to debut on that event, the duo known as Maximum Overdrive (the other newcomers being The Nasty Boys and The Master Blasters. The duo would be Tim Hunt (known as Hunter) and Warner, who was dubbed Silencer. Overdrive were defeated by the Steiners at the Clash on September 5, but that proved to be the only match for the tandem.

Twelve days later Warner was repackaged as singles wrestler J.W. Storm, with a look modeled after Steven Seagal from the movie Hard to Kill which had released earlier in the year. Storm defeated Brett Holliday in his debut at the taping for World Championship Wrestling in Macon, Georgia. Storm began a win streak, defeating Allen Iron Eagle and Tommy Rich before sustaining his first pinfall loss to Brad Armstrong, losing to him at Halloween Havoc '90 in a victory that announcer Jim Ross considered an "upset". This began a losing streak for Storm, who would sustain losses to Tom Zenk, Brad Armstrong, and fellow Portland wrestler The Juicer. Storm would go on to face Mike Rotundo, Terry Taylor, and Dave Taylor. His final match came on November 18 against Tommy Rich.

=== World Wrestling Federation (1990-1992) ===
Of the three new teams that were brought into WCW for the September Clash of the Champions XII, neither the Nasty Boys nor Maximum Overdrive appeared to have been on long-term deals. On December 11, 1990 the Nasty Boys made their World Wrestling Federation debut at a WWF Superstars taping in Tampa, Florida; at the same show J.W. Storm received a tryout match and defeated Ricky T. A day later he had another tryout at a Wrestling Challenge taping and was defeated by Shane Douglas. In February 1991 he received a second round of tryouts; on February 18 Storm was defeated by Jim Powers during a WWF Superstars taping. A day later in Ft. Myers, Florida he pinned Scott Allen at a Wrestling Challenge taping in Fort Myers, Florida. Storm received another set of tryouts in December 1991, when he returned on December 3 at a San Antonio, Texas house show and was defeated by Chris Chavis. He again wrestled Chavis the following night at a Superstars taping.

On February 14, 1992 Warner joined the WWF roster full-time. Substituting for Kerry Von Erich, Storm was defeated by The Undertaker in St Louis, Missouri. He saw extensive action in February and March, wrestling "The Model" Rick Martel, The Warlord and Hercules. Storm would gain several victories, pinning Steve Lombardi, Doug Summers, Jim Brunzell, and Kato of The Orient Express during the early part of 1992. Storm gained the services of Jimmy Hart at a Wrestling Challenge TV taping in Portland, Maine on July 21 as he faced the Dublin Destroyer, but this would be his final match of the year.

== Personal life ==
Warner credits his wife Jennifer with saving his life from drug and alcohol abuse. He became a born again Christian and, in 2002, an ordained minister through the International Ministerial Fellowship. He now tours the United States with his Ultimate Strength show that combines preaching with feats of strength, such as breaking through a stack of concrete blocks. Warner and his wife have four sons, one of which is Hunter Warner.

== Championships and accomplishments ==
- Pacific Northwest Wrestling
  - NWA Pacific Northwest Tag Team Championship (2 times) – with Art Barr
- Pro Wrestling America
  - PWA Iron Horse Television Championship (1 time)
  - PWA Tag Team Championship (1 time) – with Tim Hunt
- Pro Wrestling Illustrated
  - PWI ranked him # 335 of the 500 best singles wrestlers of the PWI 500 in 1991

== Boxing ==
Between 1989 and 2000, Warner went 22-2 in boxing, all by knockout.
