= PWA Heavyweight Championship (Minnesota) =

Professional wrestling championship

Details
- Promotion: Pro Wrestling America
- Date established: January 15, 1985
- Current champion: Udo
- Date won: September 10, 2011
Statistics
- First champion: Mad Dog Vachon
- Most reigns: Charlie Norris (5)
- Longest reign: Ricky Rice (554 days)
- Shortest reign: Erik Lockhart (>1 day)

The PWA Heavyweight Championship is a professional wrestling heavyweight championship in Pro Wrestling America (PWA). It is the only remaining championship after PWA began running occasional events in the mid-1990s.

The inaugural champion was Mad Dog Vachon, who defeated "Mr. Electricity" Steve Regal in Anoka, Minnesota on January 15, 1985 to become the first PWA Heavyweight Champion. Charlie Norris holds the record for most reigns, with five. At 554 days, Ricky Rice's first reign is the longest in the title's history. Erik Lockhart's only title reign is the shortest, at less than a day. Overall, there have been 26 reigns shared between 15 wrestlers with two vacancies.

== Title history ==
Key

#	Order in reign history
Reign	The reign number for the specific set of wrestlers listed
Event	The event in which the title was won
—	Used for vacated reigns so as not to count it as an official reign
N/A	The information is not available or is unknown
+	Indicates the current reign is changing daily

=== Reigns ===
#	Wrestlers	Reign	Date	Days held	Location	Event	Notes	Ref.
1	Mad Dog Vachon	1	January 15, 1985	426	Anoka, Minnesota	Live event	Vachon defeated Steve Regal to become the first PWA Heavyweight Champion.	
2	Ricky Rice	1	March 17, 1986	544	Omaha, Nebraska	Live event		
3	Larry Cameron	1	September 12, 1987	N/A	Fridley, Minnesota	Live event		
—	Vacated	—	1989	—	N/A	N/A	Title is vacated when Cameron leaves the territory.	
4	Ricky Rice	2	July 8, 1989	88	Yellowknife, Northwest Territories	Live event		
5	Charlie Norris	1	October 4, 1989	222	Fridley, Minnesota	Live event		
6	Ricky Rice	3	May 14, 1990	90	Fridley, Minnesota	Live event		
7	Jerry Lynn	1	August 12, 1990	41	Fridley, Minnesota	Live event		
8	Ricky Rice	4	September 22, 1990	114	St. Charles, Illinois	Live event		
9	Terminator Riggs	1	January 14, 1991	24	Fridley, Minnesota	Live event		
10	Charlie Norris	2	February 7, 1991	4	Minneapolis, Minnesota	Live event		
11	Terminator Riggs	2	February 11, 1991	120	Fridley, Minnesota	Live event		
12	Charlie Norris	3	May 11, 1991	156	Shakopee, Minnesota	Live event	Defeated The Golden Idol when Riggs failed to appear.	
13	Teijo Khan	1	October 14, 1991	69	Fridley, Minnesota	Live event		
14	Charlie Norris	4	December 22, 1991	57	N/A	Live event		
15	Punisher Sledge	1	February 17, 1992	69	Fridley, Minnesota	Live event		
16	Charlie Norris	5	April 26, 1992	177	Minneapolis, Minnesota	Live event		
17	The Hater	1	October 20, 1992	202	Minneapolis, Minnesota	Live event		
18	Tommy Ferrera	1	May 10, 1993	33	Fridley, Minnesota	Live event		
19	The Hater	2	June 12, 1993	74	Albertville, Minnesota	Live event		
20	Wellington Wilkens, Jr.	1	August 25, 1996	N/A	Sendai, Japan	Live event	Title change occurred at a Michinoku Pro event.	
—	Vacated	—	N/A	—	N/A	N/A		
21	Mitch Paradise	1	2003	N/A	N/A	N/A		
22	Asylum	1	June 28, 2008	N/A	St. Paul, Minnesota	Kaposia Days Festival (2008)		
23	Mitch Paradise	2	N/A	N/A	N/A	N/A		
24	Erik Lockhart	1	June 25, 2011	0	St. Paul, Minnesota	Kaposia Days Festival (2011)		
25	Mitch Paradise	3	June 25, 2011	79	St. Paul, Minnesota	Kaposia Days Festival (2011)	Paradise invoked his "automatic rematch clause" soon after the initial contest concluded. After regaining his title, Paradise, Lenny Lane, Billy Blaze, and Nick Mason attacked Lockhart, leaving the former champion incapacitated.	
26	Udo	1	September 10, 2011	5339+	Inver Grove Heights, Minnesota	Inver Grove Heights Days Festival (2011)		

== List of combined reigns ==
<1	Indicates that the reign lasted less than one day.

Rank (Note: Each reign is ranked highest to lowest; reigns with the same number mean that they are tied for that certain rank.)	Wrestler	# of reigns	Combined days
1	Ricky Rice	4	836
2	Charlie Norris	5	616
3	Mad Dog Vachon	1	426
4	The Hater	2	276
5	Terminator Riggs	2	144
6	Teijo Khan	1	69
7	Punisher Sledge	1	69
8	Jerry Lynn	1	41
9	Tommy Ferrera	1	33
