= Eddie Sharkey =

American professional wrestler, promoter and trainer

Personal information
- Born: Edward Shyman; February 4, 1936 (age 90) Minneapolis, Minnesota, U.S.
- Family: James Shyman (brother)

Professional wrestling career
- Ring name: Eddie Sharkey
- Trained by: Verne Gagne
- Debut: 1961

Eddie Sharkey (born Edward Shyman; February 4, 1936) is an American professional wrestler, referee, promoter, and trainer. Nicknamed the "Trainer of Champions," he is best known for discovering and mentoring some of the biggest stars of professional wrestling's 1980s boom, including Jesse Ventura, The Road Warriors, Rick Rude, Bob Backlund, Lightning Kid, Nord the Barbarian, and Barry Darsow. Sharkey's legacy is defined by his work as a trainer and promoter, particularly through his Minneapolis-based independent promotion, Pro Wrestling America (PWA), which also represented Mad Dog Vachon, Bruiser Brody, Austin Aries, and Larry Cameron. By recruiting and promoting muscular bouncers and bodybuilders at a time when smaller, technical wrestlers were favored, Sharkey ushered in the trend of the power-based style that dominated the 1980s and still leads the sport today.

Sharkey began his in-ring career in the 1950s before joining the American Wrestling Association (AWA) under Verne Gagne as a baby face in the early 1960s. As an independent promoter, Sharkey's PWA became a feeder organization for the World Wrestling Federation (WWF), now World Wrestling Entertainment (WWE). Sharkey also acted as a talent scout and referee for the WWE.

In 2006, Sharkey received the Art Abrams Lifetime Achievement Award from the Wrestling's most respected organization, the Cauliflower Alley Club. Sharkey has been featured in multiple articles, books, television specials, and documentaries. He continues to make appearances at special events.

== Early life ==
Sharkey was born and raised in Minneapolis, the son of Margaret Junkin, a home maker and Thomas Shyman, a Polish immigrant who worked in sales and merchandising in the spirits business, and was a professional tap dancer in his youth. His brother, James Shyman, became a writer, director, and actor based in Los Angeles.

Introduced to professional wrestling by his father at an early age, Sharkey developed a lifelong passion for the sport. As a teenager, showed promise as an athlete dedicated himself to weightlifting. After committing a minor offense in his teen-age years he was sent to Red Wing Reformatory School - the institution was later immortalized by Bob Dylan's song "Walls of Redwing". While there Sharkey showed an early aptitude for leadership, organizing teams of boys to complete chores more efficiently, work cooperatively. These skills would later shape his career performer, trainer, and promoter.

After leaving school, Sharkey began training as a boxer at Mill City Gym in Minneapolis under the guidance of professional boxer Del Flanagan. During his early adulthood he divided his time between Minneapolis and Los Angeles, continuing to box and train at Gold's Gym in Venice, CA.

Sharkey eventually did what many only dream of - he ran off with the circus. Joining the carnival circuit as a professional wrestler, he appeared at county fairs across the United States. His performances included novelty bouts - most memorably, wrestling a baboon billed as “Congo the Ape.” Life on the carnival circuit gave him his first experience with the showmanship, storytelling, and carefully choreographed action that defined professional wrestling.

== Professional Wrestling Career ==
American Wrestling Association (AWA)

Sharkey debuted in 1961 for Verne Gagne's American Wrestling Association (AWA), where he quickly became a popular babyface competitor. He wrestled notable opponents such as Danny Hodge, Bob Boyer, and Jack Donovan. In 1968, he won the NWA United States Heavyweight Championship.

By the early 1970s, the relationship was strained. Sharkey was frustrated by the AWA's pay structure and extensive travel schedule. Sharkey retired from active competition and transitioned into promoting and training, as well as pursuing entrepreneurial ventures, including operating an antiques and military collectibles store called "The Battle Field."

Pro Wrestling America (PWA)

Although retired from the ring, Sharkey remained active in the wrestling business as a trainer and promoter. In 1982, he recruited a pair of muscular bouncers from a Minneapolis bar, Grandma B's, to train with him. Those two men—Joe Laurinaitis (later Road Warrior Animal) and Mike Hegstrand (later Road Warrior Hawk)—went on to become the legendary tag team known as the Road Warriors. Their rise marked one of Sharkey's greatest successes as a trainer and promoter and helped cement his reputation as a key architect of the 1980s wrestling boom.

That same year, Sharkey founded Pro Wrestling America (PWA), an independent promotion based in Minneapolis. Fueled by the success of the Road Warriors, PWA quickly became one of the most prominent independent promotions in the United States. The promotion launched the careers of many future stars and helped shape the era's powerhouse-driven wrestling style. It is here that he earned his nickname, "Trainer of Champions".

Sharkey trained over 50 professional wrestlers through PWA; many went on to join the WWE. Most notably, Jesse Ventura, The Road Warriors, Ravishing Rick Rude, Bob Backlund, Lightning Kid, Nord the Barbarian, and Barry Darsow. PWA also signed wrestlers, including Paul Ellering, Tom Zenk, Nikita Koloff, The Destruction Crew (Mike Enos & Wayne Bloom), and the Steiner Brothers (Rick & Scott Steiner), as well as Mad Dog Vachon, Bruiser Brody, and Larry Cameron, who often made appearances. Although a chief rival of the American Wrestling Association during the late 1980s, Sharkey and AWA Chief Verne Gagne eventually agreed to a talent exchange deal between the two promotions. A number of PWA veterans were brought into the AWA during its final years, including Derrick Dukes and Ricky Rice.

Under Sharkey, the PWA promoted shows throughout North and South America, Asia, and the Middle East. Sharkey remained involved with PWA into the 2000s, continuing to promote occasional events and run training camps.

== Later life and legacy ==
In 2006, Sharkey was honored with the Art Abrams Lifetime Achievement Award by the Cauliflower Alley Club, a nonprofit organization for retired professional wrestlers. Well into the 2010s and 2020s, he continued to scout and mentor young talent and make appearances at independent wrestling events in the Minneapolis area.

Sharkey has described his relationship with the wrestling industry as complicated, noting in interviews that he loved the people involved more than the business itself. He often advises aspiring wrestlers simply to "have fun."

== Wrestlers trained ==
- Jesse Ventura
- Road Warrior Animal
- Road Warrior Hawk
- Bob Backlund
- Austin Aries
- Bam Neely
- Larry Cameron
- Shawn Daivari
- Barry Darsow
- Derrick Dukes
- Paul Ellering
- Mike Enos
- Josette Bynum
- Tommy Jammer
- Nikita Koloff
- Lacey
- Lenny Lane
- John Nord
- Johnny Love
- Charlie Norris
- ODB
- Rain
- Ricky Rice
- Rick Rude
- Erick Rowan
- Mighty Angus
- Rick Steiner
- Teijo Kahn
- Sean Waltman
- The Warlord
- Tom Zenk
- Wayne Bloom
- Jerry Lynn
- Madusa
- Brain Parker
- Valentin Bravo

== Championships and accomplishments ==
- Cauliflower Alley Club
  - Art Abrams Lifetime Achievement Award (2006)
- Steel Domain Wrestling
  - Lifetime Achievement Award
- National Wrestling Alliance
  - NWA United States Heavyweight Championship (Central States version)
- FLWA
  - FLWA South Haven Title
