= Ricky Rice =

American retired professional wrestler

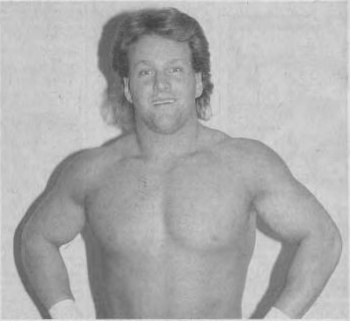

Personal information
- Born: December 13, 1951 (age 74) Edina, Minnesota, United States

Professional wrestling career
- Ring name(s): Ricky Rice; The Unknown Soldier
- Billed height: 6 ft 2 in (1.88 m)
- Billed weight: 235 lb (107 kg)
- Trained by: Eddie Sharkey
- Debut: 1986
- Retired: 1998

Ricky "The Prophet" Rice is an American retired professional wrestler. He is best known for his appearanceas with the Minneapolis-based promotions Pro Wrestling America and the American Wrestling Association.

== Professional wrestling career ==
=== Early career ===
Trained by Eddie Sharkey, Rice spent much of his early career in Sharkey's Pro Wrestling America promotion, defeating Mad Dog Vachon for the heavyweight title in March 1986 and, with Derrick Dukes, defeating The Terminators for the tag team title in June 1987 before jumping to the American Wrestling Association in early 1988.

=== American Wrestling Association ===
Although having a somewhat successful singles career feuding with The Nasty Boys, he would have more success in tag team competition teaming with Dukes, Mando Guerrero and Baron von Raschke. He would also team with Jon Paul as the Top Guns during his feud with Teijho Khan and Soldat Ustinov and later Badd Company, defeating the then AWA tag team champions by disqualification in Columbus, Nevada on July 9, 1988.

After losing to Badd Company in a rematch in Two Rivers, Wisconsin on July 29, they became involved in a short-lived feud with Beauty & The Beast, although John Paul would eventually leave the team by late 1988.

Reuniting with Dukes, they later won a mixed tag team match while teaming with Wendi Richter against AWA tag team champions Badd Company and AWA Woman's champion Madusa Miceli at AWA SuperClash III on December 13, 1988.

Making regular appearances on the promotion's syndicated television program on ESPN during early 1989, the two eventually worked their way back up the tag team ranks although failed to unseat the AWA tag team champions The Destruction Crew in St. Paul, Minnesota on February 7, 1989.

Before leaving the AWA, Rice wrestled as the Unknown Soldier, a masked wrestler in military fatigues. He participated in the very first Team Challenge Series match, defeating Mike Enos (he would later lose to Enos in a NWA Central States championship tournament in March 1989).

=== Later career ===
Wrestling for Stu Hart's Stampede Wrestling promotion during early 1989, Rice returned to PWA within several months, defeating Larry Cameron to regain the heavyweight championship on July 8, 1989. Although trading the belt with Charlie Norris and Jerry Lynn, he finally lost the heavyweight title for a fourth and final time to his old tag team rival Terminator Riggs, on September 22, 1990.

After a short stint in Windy City Pro Wrestling in which he defeated Jerry Lynn in Sullivan, Illinois on October 6, he returned to the AWA for a one-time appearance losing to Steve O on May 3, 1991.

Rice enjoyed a brief seven-day reign as the PWA Light Heavyweight champion before losing the title to Jerry Lynn on December 29. Rice remained with the promotion until its close in 1990.

In 1990 and 1991, Rice made several appearances for the World Wrestling Federation as an enhancement talent on their weekly syndicated programs, working with such stars as Ted DiBiase, Ricky Steamboat, The Big Boss Man, Kerry Von Erich, The Mountie and Bret Hart.

Inactive for much of the mid-90s, he returned to professional wrestling, competing for St. Paul Championship Wrestling in 1998.

== Championships and accomplishments ==
- Pro Wrestling America
  - PWA Heavyweight Championship (4 times)
  - PWA Light Heavyweight Championship (1 time)
  - PWA Tag Team Championship (1 time) – with Derrick Dukes
- Pro Wrestling Illustrated
  - PWI ranked him # 150 of the 500 best singles wrestlers of the PWI 500 in 1991
