= GWF Light Heavyweight Championship =

Professional wrestling championship

GWF World Light Heavyweight Championship
- The championship belt

Details
- Promotion: Global Wrestling Federation; United States Wrestling Association
- Date retired: September 21, 1994

Other name(s)
- USWA Light Heavyweight Championship
Statistics
- First champion(s): Lightning Kid
- Most reigns: Alex Pourteau (4 reigns)
- Longest reign: Lightning Kid (103 days)
- Shortest reign: Chaz Taylor (2 days)

The GWF Light Heavyweight Championship was the secondary title in the Global Wrestling Federation in Texas. The title existed from 1991 until 1994, when GWF closed. The title was defended on the promotion's show that aired nationally on ESPN.

== Tournaments ==
=== 1991 ===
The GWF Light Heavyweight Championship Tournament was a twenty-four man tournament for the inaugural GWF Light Heavyweight Championship held on July 12 and July 13, 1991. The Lightning Kid defeated Jerry Lynn in the final to win the tournament.

First Round
Handsome Stranger
Butch Blackheart
Rip Rogers
Ray Evans
Chaz
Ed Robinson
Bubba Fangman
Lightning Kid
Mike Davis
Victor Gonzales
El Bandolero
Brian Adias
Adrian Street
Iceman King Parsons
Steve Simpson
Mike Stetson
John Tatum
Khris Germany
Terry Garvin
Kenny the Stinger
Terry Daniels
Rick Garren
Jerry Lynn
Randy Rhodes
BYE
BYE
BYE
BYE
BYE
BYE

Second Round
Handsome Stranger
Rip Rogers
Chaz
Lightning Kid
Mike Davis
Brian Adias
Adrian Street
Steve Simpson
John Tatum
Terry Garvin
Terry Daniels
Jerry Lynn
BYE
BYE
BYE
BYE

Quarter Finals
Handsome Stranger
Lightning Kid
Mike Davis
Steve Simpson
John Tatum
Jerry Lynn
BYE
BYE

Semi Finals
Lightning Kid
Steve Simpson
Jerry Lynn
BYE

Final
Lightning Kid
Jerry Lynn

=== 1992 ===
The GWF Light Heavyweight Championship Tournament was a three-man tournament for the vacated GWF Light Heavyweight Championship held on May 29, 1992. The title was vacated after previous champion Danny Davis left the company for United States Wrestling Association. Terry Simms defeated Chaz in the final to win the tournament.

Semifinals
1	Terry Simms
4	Nick Busick
3	Chaz
2	BYE

Finals
Terry Simms
Chaz

== Title history ==
Key
No.	Overall reign number
Reign	Reign number for the specific champion
Days	Number of days held
N/A	Unknown information
†	Championship change is unrecognized by the promotion

No.	Champion	Championship change			Reign statistics		Notes	Ref.
No.	Champion	Date	Event	Location	Reign	Days	Notes	Ref.
1	Lightning Kid	July 13, 1991	House show	Dallas, Texas	1	62	Defeated Jerry Lynn in tournament final.	
2	Chaz Taylor	September 13, 1991	House show	Dallas, Texas	1	2		
3	Lightning Kid	September 15, 1991	House show	Marietta, Georgia	2	103		
4	Jerry Lynn	December 27, 1991	House show	Dallas, Texas	1	42		
5	Barry Horowitz	February 7, 1992	House show	Dallas, Texas	1	14		
6	Ben Jordan	February 21, 1992	House show	Dallas, Texas	1	7		
7	Barry Horowitz	February 28, 1992	House show	Dallas, Texas	2	5		
8	Danny Davis	April 3, 1992	House show	Dallas, Texas	1	21		
—	Vacated	April 24, 1992	—	—	—	—	Davis left for the USWA and later wrestles as GWF champion in Memphis.	
9	Terry Simms	May 29, 1992	House show	Dallas, Texas	1	63	Defeats Chaz in tournament final.	
10	Alex Pourteau	July 31, 1992	House show	Dallas, Texas	1	(Note: Records are unclear when Porteau lost the championship and also unclear if he lost it to Danny Davis in the USWA in August or not until October. His title reign lasted between 3 and 84 days/)		
†	Danny Davis	August 2, 1992	House show	—	2	(Note: Records are unclear when Davis won the championship, putting his title reign lasted between 42 and 63 days/)	Supposedly won the title somewhere between August 3 and August 24, 1992. Is possible this was Davis using the title he took with him from the GWF when he quit.	
†	Brian Christopher	October 5, 1992	House show	Memphis, Tennessee	1	7		
†	Danny Davis	October 12, 1992	House show	Memphis, Tennessee	3	7		
†	Brian Christopher	October 19, 1992	House show	Memphis, Tennessee	2	4		
11	Mike Dahl	October 23, 1992	House show	Dallas, Texas	1	92		
12	Alex Pourteau	January 22, 1993	House show	Dallas, Texas	2	34		
13	Calvin Knapp	February 26, 1993	House show	Dallas, Texas	1	78		
—	Vacated	November 3, 1993	—	—	—	—	Vacated for undocumented reasons	
14	Alex Pourteau	November 26, 1993	House show	Dallas, Texas	3	86		
15	Calvin Knapp	February 20, 1994	House show	N/A	2	(Note: The exact date the championship was vacated is not known, putting Knapp's championship reign at between 1 day and 191 days.)		
—	Vacated	July 20, 1994	—	—	—	—	Vacated for undisclosed reasons	
16	Alex Pourteau	August 20, 1994	House show	Guatemala	4	(Note: The exact date Porteau won the championship is not known, putting his championship reign at between 1 day and 24 days.)	Records unclear as to how he won the title or if there was even a match for it	
17	Osamu Nishimura	August 26, 1994	House show	Dallas, Texas	1	26		
—	Deactivated	September 21, 1994	—	—	—	—	When Global Wrestling Federation closed.	

== Combined reigns ==
Rank	Wrestler	No. of reigns	Combined days
1	Calvin Knapp	2	268
2	Lightning Kid	2	165
3	Alex Pourteau	4	124-228
4	Mike Dahl	1	92
5	Danny Davis	3	70-91
6	Terry Simms	1	63
7	Jerry Lynn	1	42
8	Osamu Nishimura	1	26
9	Barry Horowitz	2	19
10	Brian Christopher	2	11
11	Ben Jordan	1	7
12	Chaz Taylor	1	2

== See also ==
- Global Wrestling Federation
