= Charlie Norris =

American wrestler (1963–2023)

Personal information
- Born: Charles Norris; October 21, 1963 Red Lake, Minnesota, U.S.
- Died: February 6, 2023 (aged 59)

Professional wrestling career
- Ring name: Charlie Norris
- Billed height: 6 ft 7 in (2.01 m)
- Billed weight: 285 lb (129 kg; 20.4 st)
- Billed from: Red Lake Indian Reservation
- Trained by: Eddie Sharkey
- Debut: December 3, 1988
- Retired: 2006

Charles Norris (October 21, 1963 – February 6, 2023) was an American professional wrestler, best known for his tenure in World Championship Wrestling (WCW) in 1993. He spent most of his career in Minnesota-based Pro Wrestling America (PWA), where he became a five-time Heavyweight Champion and a two-time Tag Team Champion.

== Early life ==
Norris was born on October 21, 1963, in Red Lake, Minnesota, on the Red Lake Indian Reservation. He graduated from Red Lake Senior High School in 1984.

== Professional wrestling career ==
=== Pro Wrestling America (1989–1993) ===
Norris began training with Eddie Sharkey in 1988 and signed with Sharkey's professional wrestling promotion Pro Wrestling America (PWA), where he was quickly pushed as a main eventer. He was booked to win the promotion's Heavyweight Championship for the first time by beating Ricky Rice on October 4, 1989. This was the first title of his career, and he held the title for eight months before dropping it back to Rice on May 14, 1990. Norris regained the title from Terminator Riggs on February 7, 1991, only to lose it back to Riggs four days later. Norris's second reign was the shortest in the title's history. On May 11, Norris won his third Heavyweight Championship by beating The Golden Idol, who substituted for Riggs after the champion no-showed. Norris lost the title to Teijo Khan on October 14 before beating Khan for his fourth Heavyweight Championship on December 22. Norris lost the title to Punisher Sledge on February 17, 1992, and beat him to win the title for a record-setting fifth time on April 26. His fifth reign lasted six months, until he lost the title to The Hater on October 20. He left the company in early 1993.

In 1991, Norris was considered to be brought in to portray a Native American character in the World Wrestling Federation, but the company instead opted for Chris Chavis.

=== National Wrestling Alliance (1993) ===
In April 1993, Norris teamed with Masa Saito to defeat The Hater and Nailz at NWA Grandslam, an interpromotional event between W*ING and the National Wrestling Alliance, before signing with World Championship Wrestling (WCW).

=== World Championship Wrestling (1993) ===
Norris made his televised debut in WCW as a fan favorite on the August 21, 1993 episode of WCW Saturday Night by defeating Fury. His first rivalry began on the August 28 episode of Saturday Night against Maxx Payne, who purposely lost the match via count-out. Norris defeated Payne in a lumberjack match on the September 11 Saturday Night. He received a push during his early days by racking up wins against numerous mid-card opponents. He made his pay-per-view debut at the Fall Brawl, where he defeated Big Sky. On the October 16 episode of Saturday Night, it was announced that Norris would team with The Shockmaster and Ice Train against Harlem Heat and The Equalizer in a six-man tag team match at Halloween Havoc. In preparation for the match, Norris and his teammates defeated enhancement talents Jeff Gamble, Fred Avery, and Todd Zane on the following week's Saturday Night. At the Halloween Havoc pay-per-view, Norris and his teammates defeated Harlem Heat and The Equalizer in the opening match. Norris's push was halted when he suffered his first loss against Stone Cold Steve Austin on the November 14 episode of WCW Main Event. At the Battlebowl pay-per-view on November 20, Norris teamed with Kane of Harlem Heat against Cactus Jack and Vader in the first round of Lethal Lottery, in which Vader pinned Norris. Norris left WCW after that event. His last match was on the January 29, 1994 episode of WCW WorldWide, in which he unsuccessfully challenged Lord Steven Regal for the WCW World Television Championship.

=== Return to PWA (1994–1996) ===
After leaving WCW, Norris returned to his home promotion PWA and became a tag team competitor. On August 15, 1994, Norris won his first Tag Team Championship with Sam Houston by defeating The Storm Troopers. In 1995, Norris and Houston lost the title back to Storm Troopers. In 1996, Norris formed a tag team with Derrick Dukes called Thunderblood and defeated Storm Troopers to win the title a second time. The duo were recognized as the final champions as the title was retired later that year.

=== Independent circuit (1996–2006) ===
Also in 1996, Norris briefly joined American Wrestling Federation (AWF), teaming with Tito Santana in his feud against Bob Orton, Jr. and The Blacktop Bully. He appeared in several independent circuit cards for the next decade.

== Later life and death ==
After retiring in 2006, Norris lived on the Red Lake Indian Reservation and worked as a personal trainer at the gym in Red Lake.

Norris died on February 6, 2023, aged 59.

== Championships and accomplishments ==
- Northern Premier Wrestling
  - NPW Heavyweight Championship (1 time)
- Pro Wrestling America
  - PWA Heavyweight Championship (5 times)
  - PWA Tag Team Championship (2 times) – with Sam Houston (1) and Derrek Dukes (1)
- Pro Wrestling Illustrated
  - PWI ranked him #90 of the top 500 singles wrestlers in the PWI 500 in 1993
  - PWI ranked him # 475 of the 500 best singles wrestlers of the PWI Years in 2003
- Wrestle America 2000
  - WA2K Tag Team Championship (1 time)
