= George Gadaski =

Canadian professional wrestler

Personal information
- Born: George Kosti; 30 April 1930 Limerick, Saskatchewan, Canada
- Died: 16 December 1982 (aged 52) St. Croix Falls, Wisconsin, United States

Professional wrestling career
- Ring name(s): George Gadaski; Scrap Iron; George Kosti; Johnny Costa
- Billed height: 6 ft 0 in (183 cm)
- Billed weight: 240 lb (109 kg)
- Billed from: Great Fall, Minnesota, United States
- Trained by: Stu Hart
- Debut: 1956
- Retired: 1981

George Kosti (30 April 1930 – 16 December 1982) was a Canadian professional wrestler and referee who spent his career in the American Wrestling Association (AWA) in Minnesota under the ring name George "Scrap Iron" Gadaski. Gadaski was considered the "jack of all trades" as he did ring set up, and later became a road agent.

== Professional wrestling career ==
Originally an ice hockey player, he was the property of the Regina Pats and Chicago Blackhawks. He chose family obligations over hockey and ended his career. Trained by Stu Hart and became a wrestler.

Kosti made his professional wrestling debut in 1959 in Calgary for Stampede Wrestling. Kosti would then work in Canada and the southern States. He got the nickname "Scrap Iron" by a Georgia promoter.

Kosti made his debut in Minnesota for Verne Gagne's American Wrestling Association (AWA) in 1966 where he would be known as George Gadaski.

On December 10, 1972, Gadaski fought in Ric Flair's first ever match ending in a 10-minute draw. In 1973, he defeated Flair.

Kosti teamed with Kenny Jay during his career and wrestled his last match in 1981. Also refereed his last match in January 1982.

== Death ==
Kosti was diagnosed with a brain tumor. In April 1982, the AWA did a fundraiser. He died on December 16, 1982, from the effects from the tumor at a hospital in St. Croix Falls. He was 52.
