= Soldat Ustinov =

American professional wrestler (born 1960)

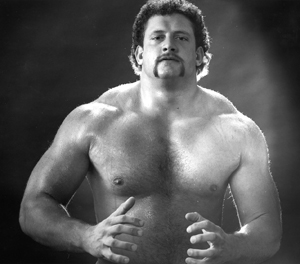

Personal information
- Born: Jim Lanning; October 10, 1960 (age 66) Minneapolis, Minnesota, U.S.

Professional wrestling career
- Ring name(s): Soldat Ustinov; Ivan the Terrible; Big Jim Steele; The Russian Krusher
- Billed height: 6 ft 5 in (1.96 m)
- Billed weight: 315 lb (143 kg)
- Billed from: Soviet Union
- Debut: 1985
- Retired: October 26, 1990

Jim Lanning (born October 10, 1960) is an American retired professional wrestler, best known by the ring name Soldat Ustinov, who played a fictional Russian character during his career. He competed in North American regional promotions including the National Wrestling Alliance (NWA) and the American Wrestling Association (AWA) during the 1980s. Before his professional wrestling career, Jim Lanning was a Gridiron football offensive lineman who signed as a free agent with the Dallas Cowboys, and also spent time in the USFL with the San Antonio Gunslingers.

== Career ==
=== American Wrestling Association (1987 - 1988) ===
Arriving in the AWA in 1987, he would begin teaming with Boris Zukhov under manager Sheik Adnan Al-Kaissie and together would defeat the Midnight Rockers for the AWA World tag team title in Lake Tahoe, Nevada on May 25, 1987. After defending the titles for almost five months with victories over Wahoo McDaniel & D.J. Peterson on August 10, Zukhov jumped to the World Wrestling Federation in October as part of The Bolsheviks with Nikolai Volkoff.

Replaced by "Pretty Boy" Doug Somers, he and Somers would hold the titles little more than a week before losing them to Jerry "The King" Lawler & "Superstar" Bill Dundee on October 10, 1987.

In 1988, Lanning would team with Sheik Adnan Al-Kaissie losing to Greg Gagne & "The Crippler" Ray Stevens on January 10 and to Wahoo McDaniel & Baron von Raschke on January 17 as well as single matches to Tom Zenk and Stevens.

Later that year, he feuded with Sgt. Slaughter losing to him by disqualification on September 17 although he and Teijho Khan would defeat Slaughter and Keith Eric by countout in a tag team match the following night.

On September 19, Lanning teamed with Khan and Colonel DeBeers in a 6-man tag team match losing to Sgt. Slaughter and The Rock 'n' Roll Express. He and Teijho Khan would later feud with Baron von Raschke and The Top Guns (Ricky Rice & Derrick Dukes) before leaving the promotion by the end of the year.

== Championships and accomplishments ==
- American Wrestling Association
  - AWA World Tag Team Championship (1 time) with Boris Zhukov and replacement partner Doug Somers
- Pro Wrestling Illustrated
  - PWI ranked him # 310 of the 500 best singles wrestlers of the PWI 500 in 1991
