= Teijo Khan =

American professional wrestler (1956–2020)

Personal information
- Born: Thomas Leroy Kasat; March 24, 1956 Saint Paul, Minnesota, United States
- Died: April 10, 2020 (aged 64) Spring Valley, Nevada, United States

Professional wrestling career
- Ring name(s): Teijo Khan; Teijho Khan
- Billed height: 6 ft 3 in (191 cm)
- Billed weight: 265 lb (120 kg)
- Billed from: Mongolia; Singapore
- Trained by: Eddie Sharkey
- Debut: 1986
- Retired: 1994

Thomas Leroy Kasat (March 24, 1956 – April 10, 2020) was an American professional wrestler, better known by his ring name, Teijo Khan/Teijho Khan. As Khan, Kasat portrayed an Asian savage despite being Caucasian. He worked as part of Paul Jones' Army in Jim Crockett Promotions and also worked for the American Wrestling Association (AWA).

== Professional wrestling career ==
Kasat made his professional wrestling debut in 1986 in Mid-Atlantic Championship Wrestling, portraying the Asian savage ring character Teijo Khan (also spelled Teijho Khan) despite being Caucasian. Kasat shaved his head bald and grew a thick Fu Manchu moustache to try to look more Asian. Having Caucasians portray Asian characters (or indeed having wrestlers from all manner of ethnic backgrounds portray ethnicities other than their own) were not unheard of in professional wrestling, examples include Canadian Newton Tattrie working as Geeto Mongol or Florida native Chris Champion portraying Yoshi Kwan. As Teijo Khan, he worked as a heel as part of manager Paul Jones's Paul Jones' Army. As part of the army he teamed up with The Barbarian, The Warlord, Abdullah the Butcher, Superstar Billy Graham, Shaska Whatley, Baron von Raschke, Manny Fernandez, Rick Rude, Ivan Koloff and Vladimir Petrov as part of their storyline feud with "The Boogie Woogie Man" Jimmy Valiant, Wahoo McDaniel and Hector Guerrero. Khan and Whatley teamed up for the 1987 Jim Crockett, Sr. Memorial Cup Tag Team Tournament. They defeated Jimmy Valiant and Lazer Tron in the first round, but lost to the previous year's tournament winners The Road Warriors (Animal and Hawk) in the next round.

Once the Army was dissolved Kasat resurfaced in the American Wrestling Association (AWA) in 1988, still working as Teijo Khan. In the AWA, he worked as the tag team partner of Soldat Ustinov, assisting Ustinov in a storyline feud against former Army partner Baron von Raschke and later, Sgt. Slaughter as well. Also in 1988 he spent some time in the Continental Wrestling Association (CWA), at one point getting involved in a CWA Heavyweight Title match between Jerry Lawler and Jimmy Jack Funk. In 1991 Khan won Pro Wrestling America's PWA Heavyweight Championship, defeating Charlie Norris to win the title, holding it for 69 days before losing it back to Norris.

== Film appearances ==
In 1986, Kasat had a part in the movie Body Slam, where he portrayed a tag team, teaming with Sione Vailahi, also known as the Barbarian, managed by Captain Lou Albano. In 1992, he had a brief part in a movie called Equinox, where he played "I.M. Stong" and was telling people how to use a clothesline.

== Death ==
Kasat died at his home in Spring Valley, Nevada, on April 10, 2020, at the age of 64.

== Championships and accomplishments ==
- Pro Wrestling America
  - PWA Heavyweight Championship (1 time)
- Pro Wrestling Illustrated
  - PWI ranked him #257 of the top 500 singles wrestlers in the PWI 500 in 1991
