= Pro Wrestling America =

US professional wrestling promotion

- Acronym: PWA
- Founded: 1985
- Style: Professional wrestling
- Headquarters: Minneapolis, Minnesota (1985–1993; 1996–present)
- Founder: Eddie Sharkey
- Owner(s): Eddie Sharkey (1985–1993; 1996–present); Terry Fox (1996–present)
- Sister: Wrestle America 2000

Pro Wrestling America is an independent wrestling promotion based in Minneapolis, MN during the 1980s and early 1990s. Founded and promoted by retired wrestler Eddie Sharkey, a longtime veteran of the American Wrestling Association and owner of the Pro Wrestling America Training Center, Pro Wrestling America featured many established wrestlers while in between the then "Big Three" (American Wrestling Association, National Wrestling Alliance and the World Wrestling Federation) as well as providing many lightheavyweight and cruiserweight wrestlers with their first national exposure, most notably, Sabu, Jerry Lynn and The Lightning Kid.

The promotion stopped running regular events in 1993, but continues to host shows in the Minneapolis area with Sharkey's wrestling school. Among the former students who have appeared for several of these events include Lacey and Austin Aries, both being top stars in Ring of Honor.

== History ==
In 1982, after leaving the AWA as a result of a pay dispute with promoter Verne Gagne, Sharkey was approached by fifteen other wrestlers similarly upset with Gagne over withholding payment and convinced Sharkey to start his own promotion. Sharkey duly set up his own promotion, Pro Wrestling America, starring his own trainees such as the two future members of the Road Warriors tag team (at this stage known as Crusher Von Haig and The Road Warrior respectively) as well as Rick Rood, and Barry Darsow (then still wrestling under his legal name). Sharkey was soon able to sign other wrestlers including Paul Ellering, Tom Zenk, Nikita Koloff, The Destruction Crew (Mike Enos & Wayne Bloom) and the Steiner Brothers (Rick & Scott Steiner) as well as Mad Dog Vachon, Bruiser Brody, Larry Cameron often making appearances. Ray Whebbe Jr. and Dale Gagner, the current owner of AWA Superstars, was also involved with the promotion. Although a chief rival of the American Wrestling Alliance during the late 1980s, Sharkey and Gagne eventually agreed to a talent exchange deal between the two promotions. A number of PWA veterans were brought into the AWA during its last years including Derrick Dukes and Ricky Rice.

In 1986, Eddie Sharkey and promoter Tony Condello worked out an agreement for PWA wrestlers to appear in televised wrestling events in central Canada. Chris Markoff, Buck Zumhofe, Ricky Rice & Derrick Dukes and The Terminators (Riggs & Wolff) were among those who appeared. Pro Wrestling America, among other regional promotions such as Georgia All-Star Wrestling and the United States Wrestling Association, also had a working relationship with the Global Wrestling Federation during its last years and allowed its own wrestlers compete in GWF tournaments and other events. Jerry Lynn and The Lightning Kid, two of the promotion's top light heavyweight wrestlers, faced each other in a match to crown the first GWF Light Heavyweight Championship. A number of PWA wrestlers often appeared on The Prima-Donns, a long-running Public-access television cable TV show in the Minneapolis area, including Eddie Sharkey, Baron von Raschke, Nick Bockwinkel and Jerry Lynn.

Pro Wrestling America was enormously successful. Despite no access to television or advertising it was the promotion was the first and only independent promotion consistently turn a profit. in 1996 Sharkey began joint promotions with Terry Fox under the names Wrestle America 2000 and Pro Wrestling America, with students from their wrestling camp. The promotions have since toured through North America, Japan, South America and the Middle East.

== Championships ==
Championship	Current champion(s)	Previous champion(s)	Date won	Location
PWA Heavyweight Championship	Wellington Wilkens Jr.		August 25, 1996	Sendai, Japan
PWA Iron Horse Television Championship	The Lightning Kid	Derrick Dukes	April 20, 1991	Mora, MN
PWA Light Heavyweight Championship	Jerry Lynn	The Lightning Kid	December 27, 1991	Dallas, TX
PWA Tag Team Championship	Thunderblood (Charlie Norris & Derrick Dukes)	Storm Troopers	January 1996	
