= Jerry Lynn =

American professional wrestler (born 1963)

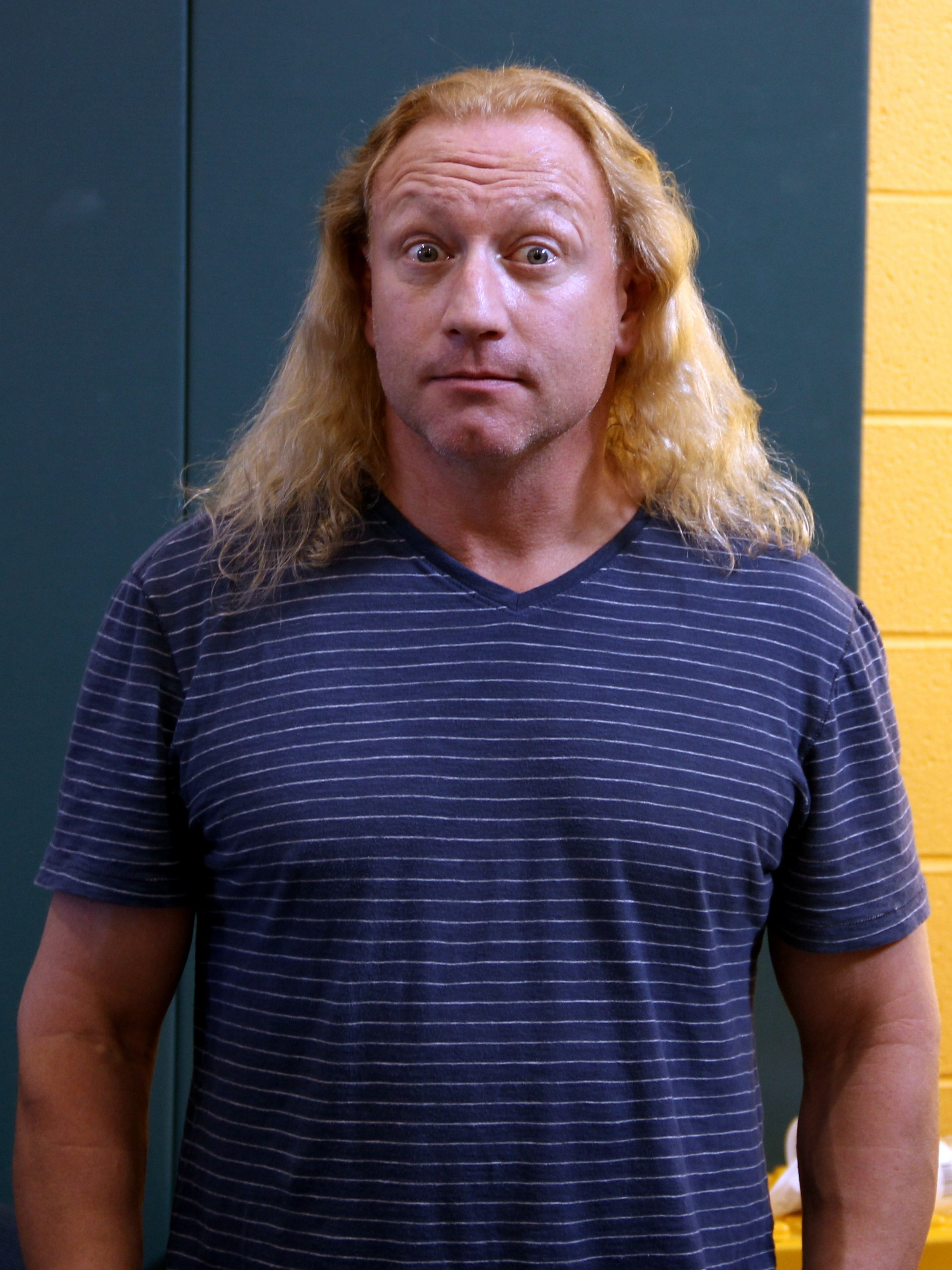
- Lynn in 2012

Personal information
- Born: Jeremy Lynn; June 12, 1963 (age 63) Duluth, Minnesota, U.S.
- Spouse: Pam Lynn (m. 2004)
- Children: 2

Professional wrestling career
- Ring name(s): Golgotha Cross; Jerry Lynn; Jerry the Ram; J. L. Mr. J. L. Sultan Gargola
- Billed height: 5 ft 11 in (180 cm)
- Billed weight: 212 lb (96 kg)
- Billed from: Minneapolis, Minnesota
- Trained by: Francisco Abarca; Brad Rheingans; Eddie Sharkey
- Debut: March 23, 1988
- Retired: March 23, 2013

Jeremy Lynn (born June 12, 1963), better known by the ring name Jerry Lynn, is an American retired professional wrestler signed with All Elite Wrestling as a producer and coach.

Lynn has worked for promotions such as World Championship Wrestling (WCW), Extreme Championship Wrestling (ECW), the World Wrestling Federation (WWF), NWA Total Nonstop Action (NWA TNA), and Ring of Honor (ROH). He is a two time world heavyweight champion, having held the ECW World Heavyweight Championship once and the ROH World Championship once. Other championships held by Lynn in his career include the GWF Light Heavyweight Championship (once), WWF Light Heavyweight Championship (once), the TNA X Division Championship (twice), the NWA World Tag Team Championship (twice) and the WWA International Cruiserweight Championship (once).

Lynn retired as an active wrestler on March 23, 2013, exactly 25 years after his career began.

== Professional wrestling career ==
=== Early career (1988–1991) ===
Lynn started wrestling in March 1988 in various independent promotions in the Minnesota and Michigan areas, one being Pro Wrestling America, where he won both their Heavyweight and Light Heavyweight championships. Lynn first joined the World Wrestling Federation in May 1989 as enhancement talent, losing to Rick Martel, and teaming with Ray Brown in a loss to Big Boss Man and Akeem later that night. In 1989, he began wrestling for Verne Gagne's American Wrestling Association, where by the end of 1990, he became the last challenger for the AWA World Heavyweight Championship, held by Larry Zbyszko, before Zbyszko left for World Championship Wrestling. In 1990, he made his first overseas trip to Japan, wrestling for Universal Lucha Libre. In January 1991, he wrestled for the United States Wrestling Association in Memphis and took part in a tournament for the USWA Southern Heavyweight Championship; he lost to Tony Anthony in the first round.

=== Global Wrestling Federation and Smoky Mountain (1991–1993) ===
In June 1991, Lynn wrestled for the Global Wrestling Federation (GWF) based in Dallas, Texas. While in GWF, Lynn captured the GWF Light Heavyweight Championship. Lynn also engaged in a two-year feud with The Lightning Kid which gave both men considerable exposure in North America. In February 1992, he had a brief stop with Smoky Mountain Wrestling in Knoxville. In 1992, Lynn would take a role as an unnamed high school senior and as a stuntman in the movie Crossing the Bridge; to prepare for the role, he did an angle with the Lightning Kid, where Kid cut Lynn's hair and sold it in small bags at $4 a bag, making a total $80.

=== International experience (1993–1995) ===
In December 1993, he returned to Japan for a tour with Michinoku Pro Wrestling. In July 1994, he went to Mexico under the masked alter-ego, Sultan Gargola for Consejo Mundial de Lucha Libre. In July 1995, Lynn returned to Michinoku Pro under the masked alter-ego Golgotha Cross, a villain from the Tiger Mask manga. Less than a month later, he would lose his mask to Gran Naniwa.

=== World Wrestling Federation (1995) ===
In April 1995, Lynn returned to the WWF in a singles loss to Rad Radford and teamed up with Lenny Lane in a loss to The Heavenly Bodies the next night.

=== World Championship Wrestling (1995–1997) ===
In September 1995, Lynn joined World Championship Wrestling, alternating between wrestling under his real name and under the masked alter-ego Mr. J.L. He joined WCW's cruiserweight division, where he competed against the Mexican luchadores and a variety of wrestlers from around the world such as Chris Benoit, Dean Malenko, Eddie Guerrero, Sabu, Chris Jericho and Alex Wright. Lynn suffered a broken arm on December 18, 1995, in a match against Dean Malenko that would air one week later on Nitro on Christmas night.

In May 1996, Lynn as Mr. J.L. went to New Japan Pro-Wrestling (NJPW), representing WCW for their annual Best of the Super Juniors league; he placed fifth on Block A with two confirmed points.

One of his last major matches took place at the Clash of the Champions XXXIV, where he suffered a six-man tag team loss while teaming with Konnan and La Parka against Chris Jericho, Super Calo and Chavo Guerrero Jr. While he was injured, Eric Bischoff fired him from WCW in July 1997.

=== World Wrestling Federation (1997) ===
After leaving WCW, Lynn appeared with the WWF in August 1997 in their light heavyweight division, wrestling only two matches. He lost to Taka Michinoku on Friday Night Main Event and defeated Steve Casey on WWF Shotgun Saturday Night.

=== Extreme Championship Wrestling (1997–2001) ===
==== Early years (1997–1999) ====
After leaving WWF, Lynn joined Extreme Championship Wrestling (ECW), where he debuted as a fan favorite at As Good as It Gets at the ECW Arena on September 20, 1997, and immediate began a "respect" feud with Justin Credible, who debuted against Lynn that same evening. Lynn formed a team with Tommy Rogers as the two began a rivalry with the team of Chris Candido and Lance Storm, losing to them in a match at Ultimate Jeopardy. Lynn made his pay-per-view debut in ECW at November to Remember, where he rescued Rogers from a double-team assault by Candido and Storm, leading to an immediate rematch between the two teams, which Rogers and Lynn lost again. Lynn defeated Chris Candido at the 1998 House Party. He then formed a tag team with Chris Chetti to feud with The Full Blooded Italians (Little Guido and Tracy Smothers), whom Lynn and Chetti defeated in matches at Hostile City Showdown and Living Dangerously.

Lynn was next booked in a series of matches against his fellow debutant Justin Credible, which saw Credible winning the last match in the feud at the Heat Wave pay-per-view. After this, Lynn was involved in a feud with Lance Storm and Mikey Whipwreck, a feud that was shortened when Whipwreck left for WCW.

==== Feuding with Rob Van Dam and World Heavyweight Champion (1999–2001) ====
Once the feud with Lance Storm was ended, Lynn was booked in a match for the ECW World Television Championship with Rob Van Dam at Living Dangerously in 1999. The finish saw Lynn win the title from Van Dam (the time limit expired and Lynn was awarded the title by referee decision instead of by pinfall or submission). Despite this win, he asked for a five-minute time extension, in which he was pinned by Van Dam after a Five-Star Frog splash. Though Lynn did not win the match, he from then on referred to himself as "The New F'N Show", mocking Van Dam's nickname, "The Whole F'N Show", as well as claiming he would be the wrestler to deprive Van Dam of the title. Though Lynn received several more title opportunities with Van Dam, he was not successful in winning the World Television Title before Van Dam was stripped of the title after suffering a legitimate broken ankle. Around the same time, Lynn also suffered a broken ankle, taking him out of action. On his return to ECW TV, Lynn challenged Van Dam to one more match at Hardcore Heaven, which Lynn won due to interference by Scotty Anton.

On October 1, 2000, at the Anarchy Rulz, Lynn defeated Justin Credible for the ECW World Heavyweight Championship. He held the title for one month, making a successful title defense against Steve Corino, to whom he lost the title to in a re-match. Lynn blamed the fans and ECW management for putting him in an unfair situation at the November To Remember, claiming they intentionally screwed him out of the championship for their new golden boy Corino. Lynn subsequently aligned with former rival Cyrus, who would serve as his manager following November To Remember and claimed that Cyrus was the only one in ECW who recognized his greatness. At the last ECW pay-per-view, Guilty as Charged in 2001, Lynn was in the main event, losing to Rob Van Dam via a Van Terminator.

=== World Wrestling Federation (2001–2002) ===
Following the bankruptcy of ECW in April 2001, Lynn was hired by the WWF. Lynn made his TV debut on the April 29, 2001, episode of Sunday Night Heat, where he defeated Crash Holly for the Light Heavyweight Championship in his debut match. He would hold the championship for 37 days and would successfully retain over former champions Crash Holly, Taka Michinoku, Dean Malenko and Essa Rios, as well as Christopher Daniels, Grandmaster Sexay and others. He eventually lost the title to Jeff Hardy and had a notable match with Rob Van Dam for the WWF Hardcore Championship on an episode of Sunday Night Heat before being released in February 2002, following a knee injury.

=== World Wrestling All-Stars (2002–2003) ===
After leaving the WWF, he joined the World Wrestling All-Stars promotion and debuted on the Revolution PPV, confronting Eddie Guerrero, who had just won the WWA International Cruiserweight Championship from Psicosis in a three-way match which included Juventud Guerrera. However, nothing came of this, as Guerrero left to return to the WWF. Lynn would take part in a tournament to determine a new International Cruiserweight champion, but lost to AJ Styles in the finals on the Eruption PPV.

In May 2003, Lynn entered another tournament to determine a new International Cruiserweight Champion, and won the vacant title by defeating Chris Sabin in the finals. However, four days later, he lost the title to Sabin, who unified the title with the TNA X-Division Championship, in a four-way match which included Johnny Swinger and Frankie Kazarian on the Reckoning PPV.

=== NWA: Total Nonstop Action (2002–2007) ===
In early June 2002 (shortly after release from the WWF), Lynn signed with Total Nonstop Action Wrestling (TNA), taking part in the first ever TNA match as part of a six-man tag match against the Flying Elvises. He won the TNA X Division Championship twice, as well as the NWA World Tag Team Championship twice (once with A.J. Styles, once with Amazing Red). He feuded with A.J. Styles and Don Callis, and was an X Division mainstay. In the late spring of 2003, he joined the newly formed All World Wrestling League/Big Time Wrestling. However, in February 2004 he suffered a severe shoulder injury, tearing the tendon from the bone in his rotator cuff, when Juventud Guerrera botched a Juvi Driver. Lynn however continued competing, playing a key role in Team NWA's feud with Team Canada. When the storyline ran its course in late 2004 Lynn stepped away from in ring competition and became a TNA road agent, planning matches and coaching younger talent.

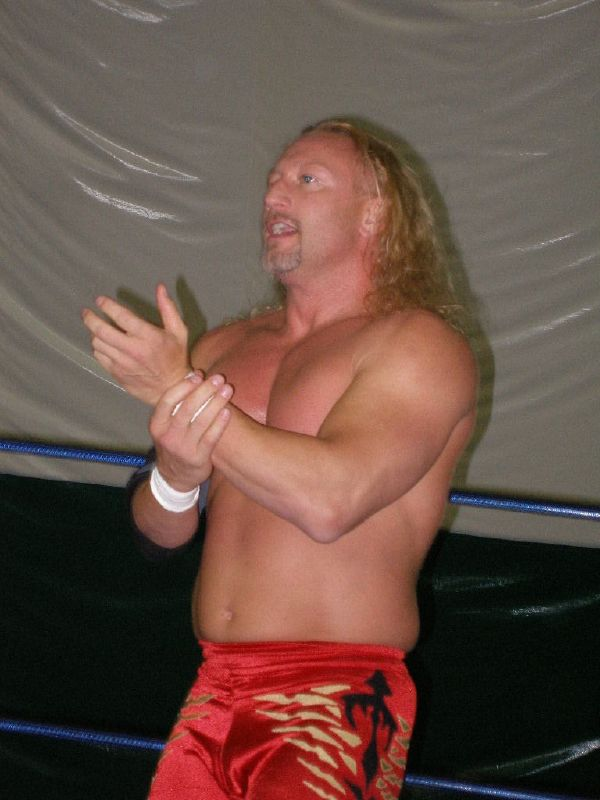
Lynn in 2007

Lynn made his return to the ring on June 10, 2005, when he faced Justin Credible at Hardcore Homecoming, an ECW reunion show organized by ECW alumnus Shane Douglas. On July 17 at No Surrender, Lynn refereed a match between Sean Waltman and A.J. Styles, refusing to allow Waltman to cheat in the course of the match. This led to a match between Lynn and Waltman at Sacrifice on August 14, which Lynn won. After the match, Waltman initially celebrated with Lynn before attacking his former partner. The following week on Impact!, it was announced that Lynn had re-injured his shoulder. (This was believed to be an angle designed to fuel the feud between Lynn and Waltman rather than a legitimate aggravation of the existing injury. The length of his absence would seem to contradict this; however, the angle was likely dropped when Sean Waltman no-showed Unbreakable a month later, as TNA would not work with Waltman on a regular basis again for over four years).

In January 2006, he began making on-screen appearances once more as a road agent. He came out at Final Resolution to watch a match which was Chris Sabin, Sonjay Dutt and Matt Bentley taking on the team of Alex Shelley, Roderick Strong and Austin Aries. Lynn continued to make several other appearances throughout the rest of 2006, and even faced Bobby Roode in a losing effort during TNA's first house show in Detroit.

On January 14, 2007, Lynn made his return to regular in ring competition returning to TNA to compete for the TNA X Division Championship against Chris Sabin and then-champion Christopher Daniels at Final Resolution, in which he delivered his trademark cradle piledriver to Daniels and subsequently got pinned by Chris Sabin. Lynn carried on to feud with Sabin over the X Division title. On an episode of Impact!, Lynn won a ladder match to become the number one contender for the TNA X Division Championship. At Destination X, Lynn was defeated by Chris Sabin in a two out of three falls match. After the match, a masked man (later revealed to be Christopher Daniels) performed the Angel's Wings on Sabin, but also hit Lynn with the title belt. At Lockdown, Daniels defeated Lynn in a Six Sides of Steel match. At Sacrifice, Jerry Lynn won a four-way X-Division battle between himself, Alex Shelley, Senshi, and Tiger Mask (New Japan Pro-Wrestling star also making his TNA debut). On June 17, 2007, at Slammiversary, Jerry Lynn teamed up with former NFL tight end Frank Wycheck to defeat the team of James Storm and Ron Killings. Wycheck pinned Storm after using Lynn's signature move, the cradle piledriver. At Victory Road in July, Jerry Lynn teamed up with former WWF World Heavyweight Champion Bob Backlund against the tag team of The Motor City Machine Guns, Alex Shelley and Chris Sabin, with Kevin Nash in their corner. Lynn wrestled the majority of the match and was knocked out cold by an interfering Kevin Nash, followed by a pinfall by Chris Sabin. In August 2007, Lynn asked for and received his release from TNA.

=== Ring of Honor (2008–2011, 2012) ===
Lynn made several appearances for Ring of Honor, prior to becoming a full-time roster member. Lynn made an appearance for Ring of Honor, where he wrestled ROH World Champion Nigel McGuinness in a non-title match, which he lost. He has also wrestled in ROH's sister promotion Full Impact Pro on two occasions, wrestling Austin Aries and Roderick Strong in a Three Way Dance, before taking on Aries the next night in a singles match. Lynn has wrestled on ROH's PPV taping on September 19, 2008, in a losing effort to Chris Hero. Then next night Lynn returned to the ECW Arena for ROH's Glory By Honor VII by defeating Kenny King. On September 22, 2008, Lynn was named a full-time member of the ROH roster. Soon after, Lynn was a participant in the inaugural match of TV show Ring of Honor Wrestling on HDNet, pinning Delirious for the win.

At Supercard of Honor IV, he defeated Nigel McGuinness to win his first ROH world title. At Manhattan Mayhem III, Lynn lost the ROH World Title to Austin Aries in a Three Way Dance, which also involved Tyler Black, on June 13, 2009. He would later enter in a rivalry with Austin Aries, Kenny King and Rhett Titus, leading to an alliance with Delirious. Lynn received the Pro Wrestling Illustrated award for "Comeback of the Year" for 2009 for his stint in ROH.

Lynn returned to ROH on December 16, 2012, at Final Battle 2012: Doomsday, where he was defeated by Mike Bennett in his final match with the promotion.

=== Return to TNA (2010–2011, 2013) ===
Lynn returned to TNA on the August 5, 2010, edition of Impact!, announcing that he would take on Rob Van Dam one more time at the ECW reunion show, Hardcore Justice, on August 8. However, on August 7 it was reported that Lynn was forced to pull out of the event due to a back injury and was replaced by Sabu. Lynn reappeared on Impact Wrestling on June 23, 2011, again confronting Van Dam, after which it was announced that the two would face each other on July 10 at Destination X. Lynn wrestled his TNA return match on the July 7 edition of Impact Wrestling, losing to Van Dam in a four-way match, which also included A.J. Styles and Christopher Daniels. At Destination X, Lynn was defeated by Van Dam in a singles match. Lynn made his next appearance on August 7 at Hardcore Justice, where accompanied Van Dam to the ring for his match with Crimson. After Van Dam was hit with Crimson's finishing maneuver, Lynn entered the ring and broke up the following pin, causing the referee to disqualify Van Dam. On the August 18 edition of Impact Wrestling, Lynn cost Van Dam another Bound for Glory Series match against A.J. Styles in similar fashion. On the September 1 edition of Impact Wrestling, Lynn turned on Van Dam, costing him his match with Gunner and, in the process, eliminating him from the finals of the Bound for Glory Series and turning heel. The following week Lynn explained his turn by claiming that he was tired of being in Van Dam's shadow and mentioned that Eric Bischoff had helped him realize it. On October 16 at Bound for Glory, Van Dam defeated Lynn in a Full Metal Mayhem match.

As part of his retirement tour, Lynn returned to TNA on January 12, 2013, as part of the tapings of the One Night Only: X-Travaganza PPV, losing to Rob Van Dam in a No Disqualification match. This would be Lynn and Van Dam's final match together.

=== Independent circuit (2003–2013) ===
Lynn worked for the All World Wrestling League presents Big Time Wrestling from late 2003 to early 2004.

Lynn participated in the East Coast Wrestling Association's eleventh-annual Super 8 Tournament, which he won after defeating Sonjay Dutt in the finals on November 10, 2007, in Newark, Delaware.

In June 2007, Lynn debuted for Anarchy Championship Wrestling (ACW), based in Austin, Texas. Lynn won the ACW Heavyweight Championship in his first match by defeating Scot Summers. Lynn would hold the title for six months and after two time limit draws, Lynn lost the title back to Summers in a no time limit match in January 2008. Lynn continued wrestling for ACW through 2008 and in November, he won the ACW tag team titles with Scot Summers. Lynn and Summers remained tag team champions for over a year before losing the titles to the Submission Squad in January 2010. Lynn returned to ACW for a match in August 2011 and then again at the start of 2012. After announcing that he would be retiring at the end of the year, the rest of Lynn's appearances became known as the retirement tour for the Godfather of Anarchy.

One of Amarillo's independent promotions, West-Texas Wrestling Association, announced January 12, 2008, at their second anniversary show that Jerry Lynn would face Kaos "The Rock Superstar" at WWA's Collision Course 3 on April 12, 2008, at The Nat "Brawl Room", hyping the fact they have two nationally known names facing off in a one-on-one match for Indy supremacy. Lynn would face local star, Mark Wilson, instead, due to an injury sustained by Joey Munoz. Jerry Lynn would return to WWA frequently to face local Amarillo stars. He would also face, and defeat, Justin Credible and Raven, in separate matches in WWA.

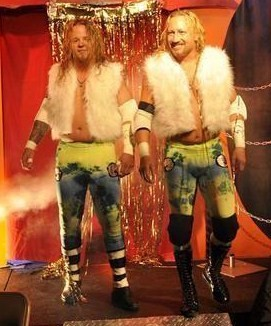
Ram-Jam (Lynn, right, and Grimmy Jam, left)

Lynn participated in Pro Wrestling Syndicate's Majestic Twelve Tournament on March 22, 2008, in Yonkers, New York. Lynn teamed with Kenny Omega in the first round defeating Tommy Suede and Kevin Matthews. Omega eliminated Lynn in Round 2. Lynn's most recent PWS match was on May 8, 2010, when he defeated Vampiro in White Plains, New York.

On April 25, 2008, Lynn defeated Jason Gory, Shiima Xion, and Davey Richards to win the Super Indy VII Tournament that is held by International Wrestling Cartel. Traditionally, the winner of the tournament is awarded the IWC Super Indy Championship. However, Lynn refused to accept the belt and instead challenged the champion Larry Sweeney to a title match at the next show. On May 17, 2008, Lynn defeated Sweeney to officially become IWC Super Indy Champion. On September 13, 2008, Lynn lost the Super Indy title to kayfabe apprentice Johnny Gargano in a 3 Way Dance, which also included Super HENTAI.

On March 10, 2012, Lynn announced that he would retire from professional wrestling at the end of the year.

On April 28, 2012, Lynn defeated Devon Storm at Extreme Reunion in Philadelphia, Pennsylvania.

On September 14, 2012, Lynn made his debut for Chikara, when he, Too Cold Scorpio and Tommy Dreamer entered the 2012 King of Trios as "The Extreme Trio", defeating Team WWF (1-2-3 Kid, Aldo Montoya and Tatanka) in their first round match. The following day, The Extreme Trio was eliminated from the tournament by Team ROH (Mike Bennett, Matt Jackson and Nick Jackson).

On November 10, 2012, Lynn wrestled for MPX in Bedford, Texas where he won a fatal four way to become the MPX Champion. Lynn immediately vacated the title due to his impending retirement and the match marked his final appearance in the Dallas/Fort Worth area where he spent much of his early career with the GWF. On February 9, 2013, Lynn defeated Lance Storm in his final match in Pro Wrestling Syndicate in the Main Event of the show.

Lynn wrestled his retirement match at the Minneapolis Convention Center on March 23, 2013, which was the 25th anniversary of his debut as a professional wrestler. The event was promoted by Dave Sabick along with his promotion Heavy On Wrestling. He faced Horace the Psychopath, JB Trask and Sean Waltman in a four-way match, in which he was victorious. After the match, the locker room came out to celebrate Lynn's career and he was presented with a trophy.

=== Return to ROH (2014–2019) ===
Lynn was backstage at Ring of Honor's Best in the World 2014 pay-per-view in Nashville, Tennessee, where he now lives. Sporting a new shorter haircut, this was the first wrestling show he's attended since retiring in 2013. In December 2015, Lynn returned to Ring of Honor where he had a confrontation with ROH World Champion Jay Lethal. At Final Battle 2015, Lynn would be on commentary during the main event between Lethal and AJ Styles alongside Kevin Kelly and Nigel McGuinness. In 2016, Lynn began work for the company as a backstage agent/producer.

=== All Elite Wrestling (2019–present) ===
In 2019, Lynn signed with All Elite Wrestling (AEW) as a coach and producer. On January 19, 2021, episode of Impact Wrestling, Jerry Lynn and Tony Khan debuted by watching Private Party wrestle against Chris Sabin and James Storm in a match when Private Party defeated Sabin and Storm. Lynn interfered in the match, allowing Private Party to win. He made an appearance in Philadelphia following Rampage on October 8, 2021, when Tony Khan called him out alongside Dean Malenko, Taz and Chris Jericho to thank them for inspiring him.

On the September 7, 2022, episode of AEW Dynamite, he was a judge for ROH Pure Championship. On December 10, 2022, he was also a judge during the ROH Pure Championship match at Final Battle, and also celebrated with Claudio Castagnoli following his ROH Championship win.

On the June 8, 2023 episode of ROH TV, Lynn and Stokely Hathaway were announced by Tony Khan as the new ROH Board of Directors.

== Professional wrestling style and legacy ==
Lynn uses the Cradle Piledriver as his finishing move. According to him, he used the move after a recommendation from Nova, who was inspired by Dynamite Kid.

Former wrestler Lance Storm described Lynn as "Academy Award winning supporting actor. One of the greatest actors of all time, who was just never cast in that lead role", while sports journalist Dave Meltzer described him as "one of the most underrated workers of the last quarter century".

== Championships and accomplishments ==
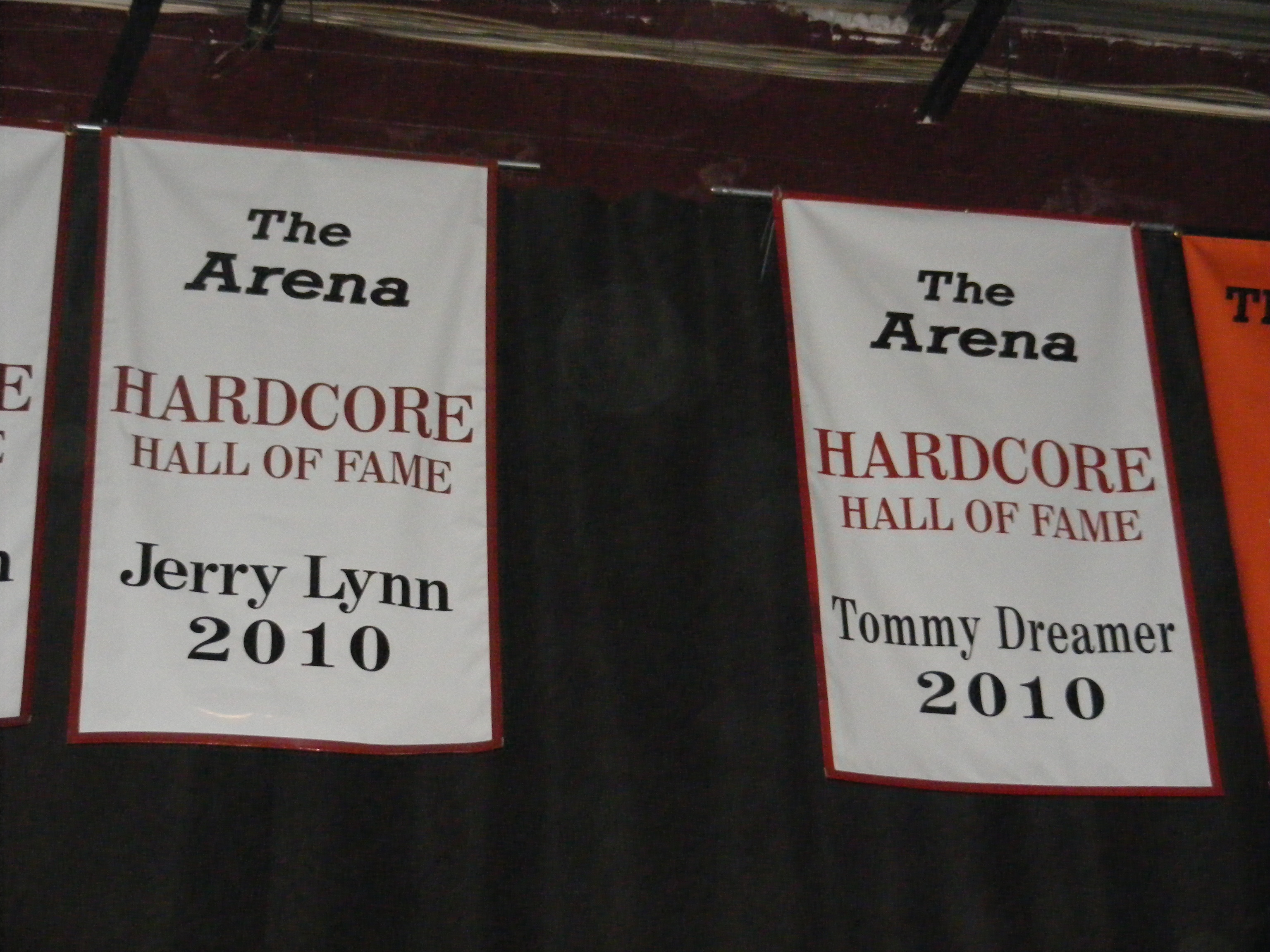
Lynn's Hardcore Hall of Fame banner in the former ECW Arena

- All American Wrestling
  - AAW Heavyweight Championship (1 time)
- Anarchy Championship Wrestling
  - ACW Heavyweight Championship (1 time)
  - ACW Tag Team Championship (1 time) – with Scot Summers
  - Anarchy Elite (2016)
- Born Championship Wrestling
  - BCW Heavyweight Championship (1 time)
- East Coast Wrestling Association
  - Super 8 Tournament (2007)
- Extreme Championship Wrestling
  - ECW World Heavyweight Championship (1 time)
- Extreme Rising
  - Legend of the Year (2012)
- Frontier Wrestling Alliance
  - FWA British Heavyweight Title No.1 Contenders Round Robin Challenge (2002)
- Gateway Championship Wrestling
  - GCW Heavyweight Championship (1 time)
- Global Wrestling Federation
  - GWF Light Heavyweight Championship (1 time)
- Hardcore Hall of Fame
  - Class of 2010
- Heavy On Wrestling
  - Hall of Fame (2013)
- Independent Wrestling Association East Coast
  - IWA East Coast Heavyweight Championship (1 time)
- Independent Wrestling Association Mid-South
  - IWA Mid-South Heavyweight Championship (1 time)
- Indie Wrestling Hall of Fame
  - Class of 2022
- International Wrestling Cartel
  - IWC Super Indy Championship (1 time)
  - Super Indy Tournament (2008)
- Metroplex Wrestling
  - MPX Championship (1 time)
- NWA Mid-South
  - NWA Mid-South Heavyweight Championship (1 time)
- NWA Total Nonstop Action
  - NWA World Tag Team Championship (2 times) – with A.J. Styles (1) and Amazing Red (1)
  - TNA X Division Championship (2 times)
  - World X Cup (2004) – with Chris Sabin, Christopher Daniels and Elix Skipper
  - NWA World Tag Team Championship Tournament (2002) - with AJ Styles
- New Era Pro Wrestling
  - NEPW Triple Crown Championship (1 time)
- New York Wrestling Connection
  - NYWC Heavyweight Championship (1 time)
  - NYWC Hi-Fi Championship (1 time)
  - NYWC Interstate Championship (1 time)
  - NYWC Hall of Fame (Class of 2019)
- Premier Wrestling Federation
  - Match of the Year (2004) - with Masato Tanaka
- Pro Wrestling America
  - PWA Heavyweight Championship (1 time)
  - PWA Light Heavyweight Championship (3 times)
  - PWA Tag Team Championship (1 time) – with The Lightning Kid
- Pro Wrestling Illustrated
  - PWI Comeback of the Year (2009)
  - PWI Most Improved Wrestler of the Year (1999)
  - Ranked No. 29 of the top 500 singles wrestlers of the PWI 500 in 2003
  - Ranked No. 281 of the top 500 greatest wrestlers in the "PWI Years" in 2003
- Ring of Honor
  - ROH World Championship (1 time)
- Showtime All-Star Wrestling
  - SAW International Heavyweight Championship (1 time)
- Steel Domain Wrestling
  - SDW Television Championship (1 time)
- Suncoast Pro Wrestling
  - SPW Tag Team Championship (1 time) – with Brady Boone
- United States Wrestling Organization
  - USWO Heavyweight Championship (1 time)
  - USWO Television Championship (1 time)
- World Wrestling All-Stars
  - WWA International Cruiserweight Championship (1 time)
  - WWA International Cruiserweight Title Tournament (2003)
- World Wrestling Federation
  - WWF Light Heavyweight Championship (1 time)
