= Baron von Raschke =

American professional and amateur wrestler (born 1940)

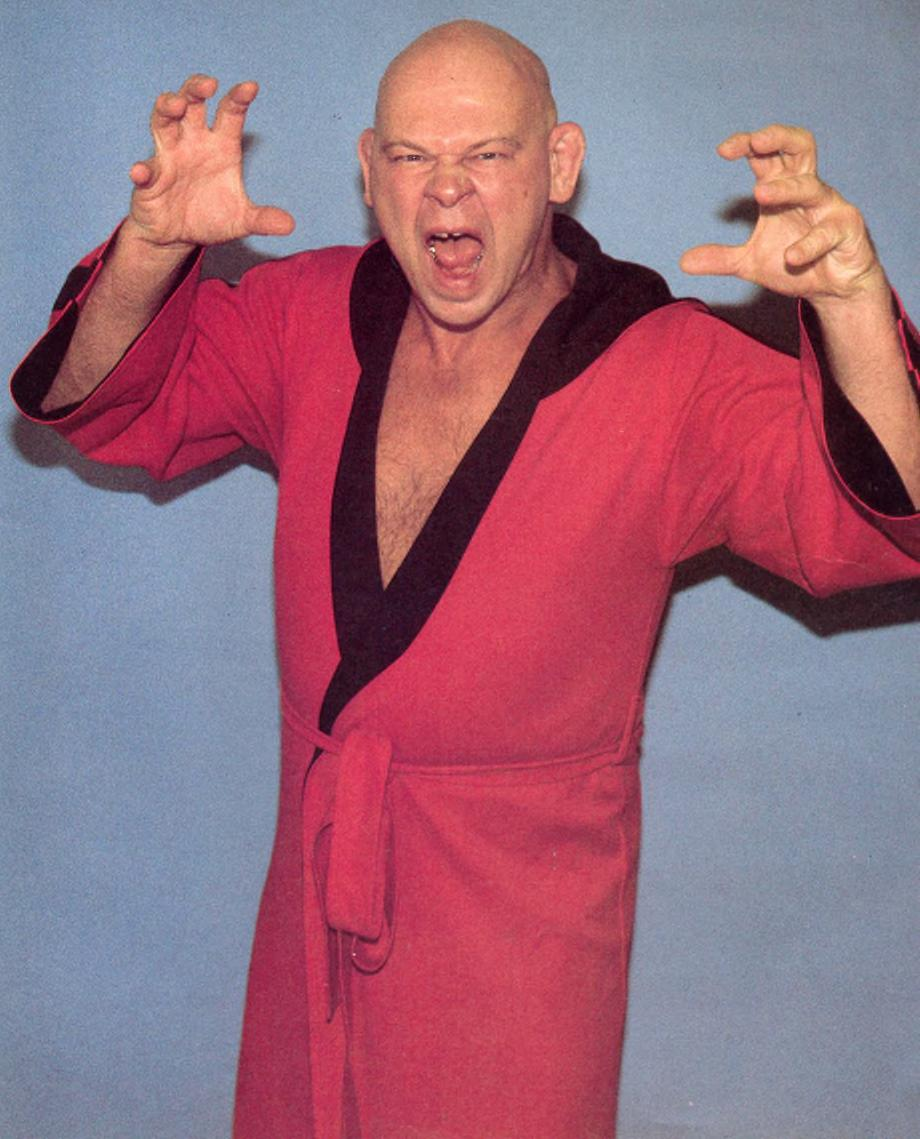
- Raschke, circa 1985

Personal information
- Born: James Donald Raschke; July 30, 1940 (age 86) Omaha, Nebraska, U.S.
- Education: University of Nebraska

Professional wrestling career
- Ring name(s): The Baron; Baron von Raschke; The Clawmaster; Fritz von Raschke; Jim Raschke
- Billed height: 6 ft 3 in (191 cm)
- Billed weight: 281 lb (127 kg)
- Billed from: Republic of Germany
- Trained by: Verne Gagne; Mad Dog Vachon
- Debut: 1966
- Retired: 1996

Medal record

Men's Greco-Roman wrestling

Representing the United States

World Championships
Bronze medal – third place	1963 Helsingborg	+97 kg

Collegiate Wrestling

Representing the Nebraska Cornhuskers

Big Eight Championships
Gold medal – first place	1962 Ames	Heavyweight

James Donald Raschke (born July 30th, 1940) is an American retired professional wrestler, better known by his ring name, Baron von Raschke.

== Early life ==
Raschke was a three-year letterman with the Nebraska Cornhuskers wrestling team in 1960, 1961 and 1962. He is listed in the university's wrestling media guide as Jim Raschke. He also played football for the Cornhuskers as a left tackle in 1959 and 1960. After a successful amateur wrestling career and a stint in the United States Army, Raschke pursued a career in professional wrestling.

== Professional wrestling career ==
Raschke started in professional wrestling in 1966 in the American Wrestling Association as a referee. He was soon wrestling under his real name, playing off of his amateur wrestling notoriety in the area. He eventually changed his ring name to Baron von Raschke and claimed to be from Germany. He would do a goose-step and then put his finisher known as the "brainclaw", on his opponent. Earlier in his career, the Von Raschke had a finishing maneuver known as the "Prussian sleeper", a rather complex variation of a traditional sleeper hold. His mantra at the time was "I am ordered to win! I must win! And I will win!"

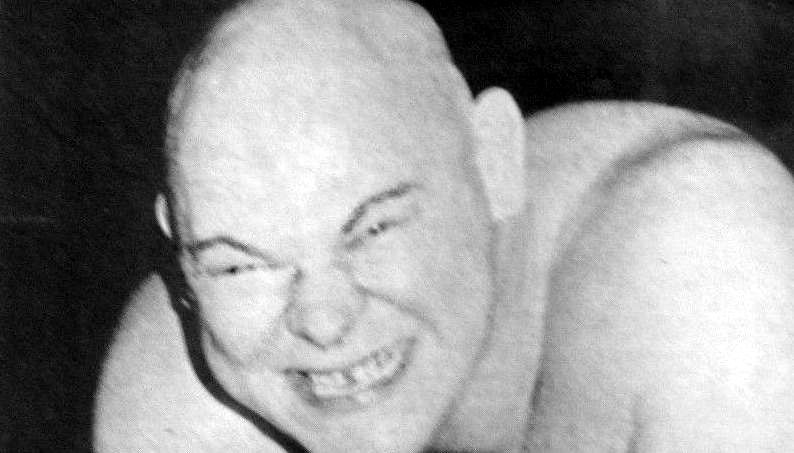
Raschke in 1975

Throughout the 1970s and early 1980s he held numerous singles and tag team titles throughout several NWA and AWA territories, as well as wrestling for the WWWF, where his claw hold was "censored" by a huge red X on WWWF television because it was considered such a violent act. Managed by Fred Blassie, Von Raschke's highest-profile match of his 1970s WWWF run came in March 1977, where he wrestled WWWF World Heavyweight Champion Bruno Sammartino for the title at Madison Square Garden in New York. Von Raschke lost the match by disqualification when, after Sammartino became tied up in the ropes, he shoved the referee away as he had his clawhold applied to Sammartino's head. Sammartino defeated Von Raschke in a rematch a month later at Madison Square Garden, marking Sammartino's last successful title defense before losing the belt to Superstar Billy Graham.

In 1978, Von Raschke was recognized as the first NWA Television champion (the Mid Atlantic Television title had been renamed). In May 1984, Raschke and The Crusher defeated Jerry Blackwell and Ken Patera for the AWA World Tag Team Championship. They would lose the belts in August of that same year to The Road Warriors.

In 1986, he wrestled for the National Wrestling Alliance's Jim Crockett Promotions where he reunited with former tag partner Paul Jones (who was now a manager) as part of Paul Jones' Army. He also filled in for the injured Krusher Khruschev, defending the NWA World Six-Man Tag Team Championship with Ivan Koloff and Nikita Koloff. Toward the end of his run there he turned "face" against Jones and teamed with Hector Guerrero defeating the Barbarian and Pez Whatley at Starrcade '86: The Skywalkers. After teaming with Wahoo McDaniel at the 1987 Crockett Cup he left the National Wrestling Alliance.

He had a brief stint in the World Wrestling Federation in 1988 as the manager for The Barbarian and The Warlord (the Powers of Pain) under the name of the "Baron", but was released shortly after his arrival.

Raschke resurfaced in the AWA, returning to the ring to feud with Soldat Ustinov and Teijho Khan in late 1988. He then went on to captain "Baron's Blitzers" during the Team Challenge Series. When the AWA folded, Raschke continued to wrestle for independent promotions, primarily in the Minnesota area, retiring in 1995.

Raschke also took part in one of the legends matches at WCW's inaugural Slamboree: A Legend's Reunion in 1993. He teamed with Ivan Koloff, losing to Thunderbolt Patterson and Brad Armstrong.

His last match was a victory over David Lynch at Superstars of Wrestling in Princeton, West Virginia on February 10, 1996.

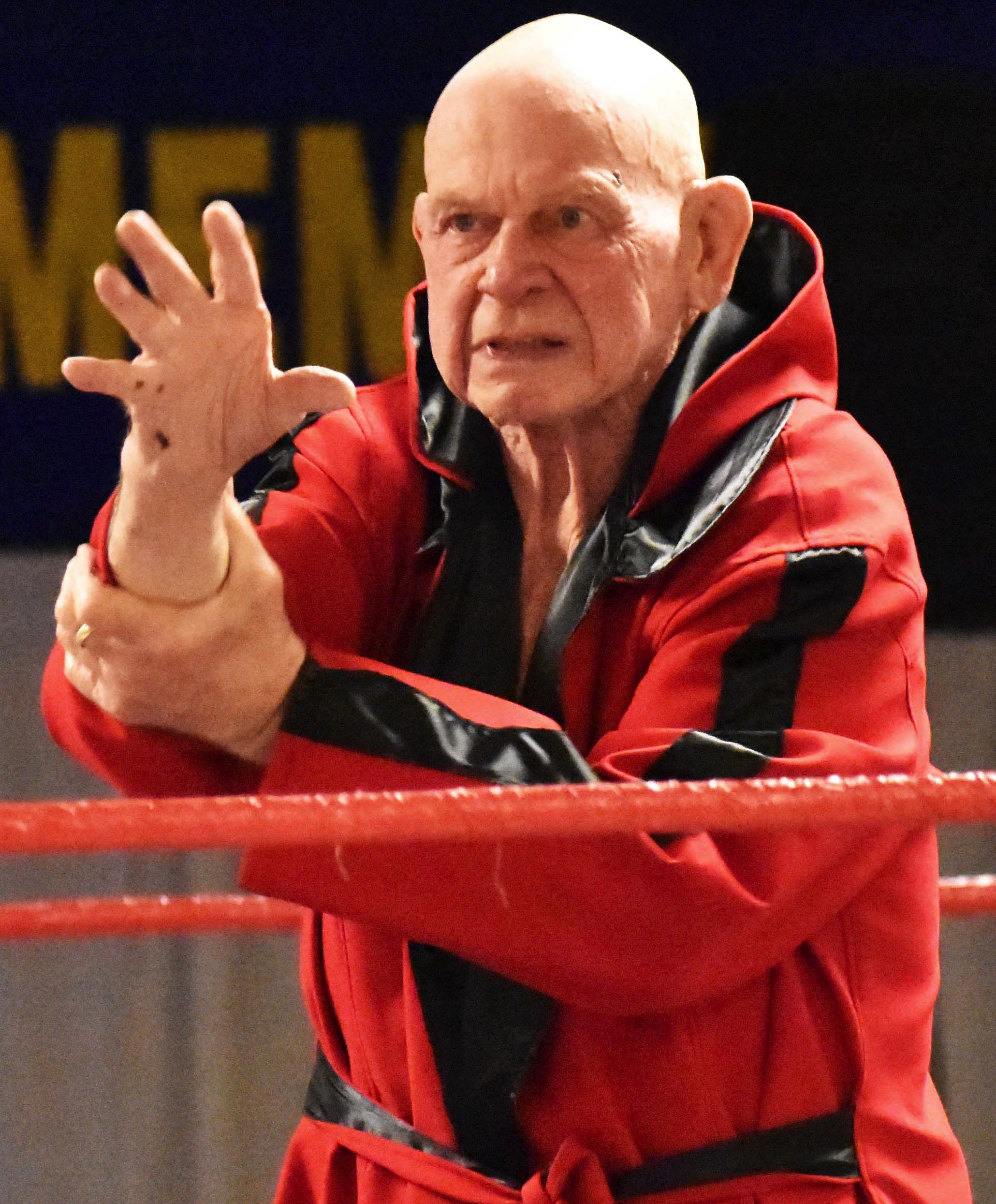
Von Raschke in 2019

In November 2021, Raschke appeared with All Elite Wrestling at its Full Gear pay-per-view. He was in the crowd for the 10-man street fight between The Inner Circle and American Top Team and put the Claw on Ethan Page.

In October 2026, Raschke returned to the ring after 30 years, competing in a gauntlet match for Dreamwave Wrestling in Lasalle, IL. At the age of 86, he became the oldest man to compete in a pro wrestling match, surpassing previous record holder Peter Thornley.

== Personal life ==
When not wrestling, Raschke worked as a substitute teacher. Upon retirement, Raschke purchased and managed a bric-a-brac shop called "The Wigwam" in Lake George, Minnesota. He sold it in 2000. During the 1990s, he also worked at the Minnesota Zoo as a part-time Monorail driver.

== Legacy ==
=== Stage play: The Baron ===
In April 2007, Raschke starred in a stage play, The Baron, based around his life, persona, and times in the AWA. The Baron, co-written by Cory McLeod and Raschke's son Karl, ran for several months at the Minnesota History Theatre. It detailed how a very mild-mannered and polite man created an in-ring gimmick that drew so much heat that he and his frequent tag-team wrestling partner (and real-life friend) Mad Dog Vachon often had to fight their way out of the ring.

=== Film documentary: The Claw ===
The stage play was later used as the starting point for a film version of Raschke's life and career, The Claw. The film, again written by Karl Raschke, was directed by Phil Harder, a noted director of dozens of music videos, who had first met Raschke when he hired the wrestler to star in a video by Duluth indie-rock band Low. The film was shot in Minneapolis, with locations including the nightclub First Avenue (where the wrestling re-enactments were filmed), Mancini's restaurant, and the Walker Art Center. Begun in 2010, The Claw took nearly 10 years to complete and made its debut as part of the Minneapolis–Saint Paul International Film Festival in 2021. It was hailed as "wildly entertaining" by St. Paul Pioneer Press critic Ross Raihala.

== Championships and accomplishments ==
=== Amateur wrestling ===
- 1958 Nebraska State High School Heavyweight Championship (Omaha North High School)
- 1962 Big Eight Conference Heavyweight Championship (University of Nebraska)
- 1963 World Championships Bronze medalist in Greco-Roman
- 1964 Olympic Team qualifier
- 1964 Amateur Athletic Union Freestyle Championship
- 1964 Amateur Athletic Union Greco-Roman Championship
- 1965 Worldwide Interservice Wrestling Championship (United States Army)
- 1985 inductee to the Nebraska Scholastic Wrestling Coaches Association Hall of Fame

=== High school football ===
- 1957 Nebraska State Championship – Omaha North High School

=== Professional wrestling ===
- American Wrestling Association
  - AWA World Tag Team Championship (1 time) – with Crusher Lisowski
- Cauliflower Alley Club
  - Iron Mike Mazurki Award (2018)
  - Other honoree (2004)
- Central States Wrestling
  - NWA World Tag Team Championship (Central States version) (1 time) – with Maurice Vachon
  - NWA North American Tag Team Championship (Central States version) (2 Times) – with Harley Race
- Championship Wrestling from Florida
  - NWA Florida Television Championship (1 time)
- George Tragos/Lou Thesz Professional Wrestling Hall of Fame
  - Class of 2002
  - Impact Award honoree (2025)
- Georgia Championship Wrestling
  - NWA Georgia Heavyweight Championship (1 time)
- International Wrestling Association
  - IWA International Heavyweight Championship (1 time)
- Mid-Atlantic Championship Wrestling
  - NWA Television Championship (2 times)
  - NWA World Six-Man Tag Team Championship (1 time) – with Ivan and Nikita Koloff when Krusher Khruschev was injured
  - NWA World Tag Team Championship (Mid-Atlantic version) (3 times) – with Paul Jones (2) and Greg Valentine (1)
- NSW
  - NSW Tag Team Championship (1 time) – with Tommy Jammer
- NWA Big Time Wrestling
  - NWA American Heavyweight Championship (1 time)
  - NWA Brass Knuckles Championship (Texas version) (1 time)
- Professional Wrestling Hall of Fame
  - Class of 2013
- Pro Wrestling America
  - PWA Tag Team Championship (2 times) – with Ken Patera (1) and Brad Rheingans (1)
- Pro Wrestling Illustrated
  - PWI ranked him # 306 of the 500 best singles wrestlers of the PWI Years in 2003
- St. Louis Wrestling Hall of Fame
  - Class of 2009
- World Wrestling Association
  - WWA World Heavyweight Championship (3 times)
  - WWA World Tag Team Championship (1 time) – with Ernie Ladd
- Wrestling Observer Newsletter
  - Worst Tag Team (1984) with The Crusher
- Nebraska Pro Wrestling Hall of Fame
  - Class of 2018 Inductee
