= Derrick Dukes =

American professional wrestler

Personal information
- Born: January 4, 1965 (age 61) Barberton, Ohio, United States

Professional wrestling career
- Ring name(s): Derek Dukes; Derrick Dukes; Luther D. Mr. O-Portunity
- Billed height: 6 ft 2 in (188 cm)
- Billed weight: 235 lb (107 kg)
- Trained by: Eddie Sharkey
- Debut: 1986
- Retired: 2001

Derrick Dukes (born January 4, 1965) is an American retired professional wrestler and boxer. He best known for his appearances in the American Wrestling Association in the late-1980s as one-half of the tag team "The Top Guns" with Ricky Rice.

== Professional wrestling career ==
=== Early career (1986–1988) ===
Dukes and Rice, who had formerly competed in Eddie Sharkey's Pro Wrestling America in Minnesota, were one of several brought into central Canada by promoter Tony Condello in 1986.

=== American Wrestling Association (1988–1989) ===
While in the AWA, Rice and Dukes feuded with Badd Company over the AWA tag team titles but broke up shortly after appearing at SuperClash III with Wendi Richter in a mixed 6-person tag team match against Badd Company and Madusa Miceli on December 13, 1988. After participating in the "Superstars of Wrestling" tour of Europe in early 1988, Dukes then feuded with Colonel DeBeers in 1989 and lost a "Loser Gets Painted Yellow" match at War in the Windy City, however the controversial nature of the match caused it to be subsequently cut from the televised broadcast.

=== Various promotions (1989–1992) ===
After AWA folded, Dukes would return to Pro Wrestling America where he lost to the Lightning Kid in a match for the PWA Iron Horse Television Championship on April 20, 1990.

=== Catch Wrestling Association (1992) ===
In 1992, Dukes wrestled in Germany and Austria with the Catch Wrestling Association.

=== Late career (1992–2001) ===
In 1995, he returned to Pro Wrestling America and teamed with former World Championship Wrestling wrestler Charlie Norris as "Thunderblood" winning the PWA Tag Team titles from the Storm Troopers and remained tag team champions until the promotion's closure in early 1996.

In 1999 he toured Japan with Worldwide Pro Wrestling.

In August 1999 he worked a few matches in the WWF. He lost to Prince Albert in a dark match for Sunday Night Heat. He appeared TV twice on WWF Shotgun Saturday Night episode August 21 with Tony DeNucci losing to Mideon and Viscera and the very first episode of Jakked August 28 teaming with Scotty Zappa losing to Blue Meanie and Stevie Richards.

Dukes retired in 2001.

== Boxing career ==
Dukes pursued a career in boxing for a brief period during the early 1990s. His most famous bout came against former National Football League All Pro Mark Gastineau in Salem, Virginia on June 8, 1991. Gastineau knocked Dukes out in the first round of the fight, however it was later found out that Dukes took a dive.

In 1999, Dukes lost to Innocent Otukuwu in Lula, Mississippi on July 31, and Chris Brown in Memphis, Tennessee on September 7, in an attempt at a comeback.

== Championships and accomplishments ==
- World Wrestling Council
  - WWC Television Championship (1 time)
- International Wrestling Association
  - IWA United States Heavyweight Championship (1 time)
- Pro Wrestling America
  - PWA Iron Horse Television Championship (3 times)
  - PWA Tag Team Championship (2 times) - with Ricky Rice and Charlie Norris
- Pro Wrestling Illustrated
  - PWI ranked him # 153 of the 500 best singles wrestlers of the PWI 500 in 1991
- St. Paul Championship Wrestling
  - SCW Northern States Heavyweight Championship (1 time)
