= Rough cut (disambiguation) =

A rough cut is a stage of film editing in which the film begins to resemble its final product.

Rough Cut or Rough Cuts may also refer to the following:

- Rough cut, a stage of the audio mastering process
- Rough cut, the practice of intentionally leaving the edges of the pages of a book or other publication in a rough "unfinished" state, as in a deckle edge
- Rough Cut (1980 film), an American film directed by Don Siegel
- Rough Cut (2008 film), a South Korean film directed by Jang Hoon
- Rough Cut, a 2007 album by Hadiqa Kiani
- Rough Cut Comics, a Scottish comic book publisher
- Rough Cuts (radio series), a blog and podcast published by National Public Radio
- Rough Cuts (TV series), a Canadian television series presenting documentary films
- Rough Cutt, an American heavy metal band or their eponymous first album
- Rough Cut with Fine Woodworking, an American television show produced by WGBH Educational Foundation
