= Verotika =

2019 American anthology horror film

- Promotional release poster
- Directed by: Glenn Danzig; Bridgid Ryan; Greg L Smith
- Written by: Glenn Danzig
- Produced by: James Cullen Bressack; Jarrett Furst
- Starring: Rachel Alig; Alice Haig; Natalia Borowsky; Sean Kanan; Scotch Hopkins; Ashley Wisdom; Kayden Kross
- Cinematography: David Newbert; Glenn Danzig
- Edited by: Brian Cox
- Music by: Glenn Danzig
- Production companies: Dark Risen Pictures; UFO Pictures
- Distributed by: Cleopatra Entertainment
- Release date: June 13, 2019 (Cinepocalypse)
- Running time: 90 minutes
- Country: United States
- Language: English

Verotika is a 2019 American anthology horror film written by Glenn Danzig and directed and scored by Glenn Danzig. Based on a line of comic books published by Danzig's company Verotik, the film stars Rachel Alig, Alice Haig, Natalia Borowsky, Sean Kanan, Scotch Hopkins, Ashley Wisdom, and Kayden Kross. Verotika was panned by critics.

== Premise ==
The film is divided into three segments. The first segment, "The Albino Spider of Dajette," depicts a Parisian sex worker named Dajette, who has eyeballs for nipples, and an albino spider that assumes the form of an eight-armed humanoid. The spider murders sex workers by breaking their necks. The second segment, "Change of Face," revolves around a mysterious stripper who collects the faces of other women. The final segment, "Drukja Contessa of Blood," follows a countess who murders virgin women and bathes in their blood.

== Cast ==
=== "The Albino Spider of Dajette" ===
- Ashley Wisdom as Dajette
- Scotch Hopkins as the Albino Spider
- Paul Vandervort as Francois
- James Cullen Bressack as Passerby
- Tonya Kay as Platinum Model
- Cody Renee Cameron as the Struggling Woman.

=== "Change of Face" ===
- Rachel Alig as Mystery Girl
- Sean Kanan as Sgt. Anders
- Courtney Stodden as Pretty Blonde
- Sean Waltman as Counter Person

=== "Drukija Contessa of Blood" ===
- Alice Haig as Drukija
- Kayden Kross as Morella
- Natalia Borowsky as Sheska
- Caroline Williams as Peasant Woman
- Kansas Bowling as Young Peasant Girl
- Brennah Black as Blonde Girl

== Production and release ==
Verotika is based on comic books by published by Verotik, a company owned by writer-director Glenn Danzig. Danzig has referred to Verotika as a tribute to horror anthology films such as Black Sabbath and Trilogy of Terror. The third segment in the film, "Drukija Contessa of Blood", has been described as "a take" on historical figure and murderer Elizabeth Báthory.

Verotika premiered on June 13, 2019 at the Cinepocalypse film festival in Chicago, Illinois. Throughout the screening, the film elicited laughter from the audience. In a Q&A session following the showing, Danzig asserted that he did not intend for the film to be comedic, stating that viewers laughed at parts that "[he] wouldn't have". The film had its international premiere at the Sitges International Fantastic Film Festival in Catalonia, Spain on October 4, 2019.

=== Home media ===
The film was released on Blu-ray and DVD in March 2020.

== Reception ==
Verotika was panned by critics, with multiple publications comparing it to the 2003 film The Room, which is commonly considered to be one of the worst films ever made. On the review aggregator website Rotten Tomatoes, the film holds an approval rating of 22% based on 18 reviews, with an average rating of 3/10. Patrick Bromley of Bloody Disgusting wrote that "the audience reaction at Cinepocalypse suggests that Verotika has a future as a midnight movie in the same vein as The Room. There's plenty of entertainment and plenty of laughs to be had, even if I'm not sure it's what director Danzig originally intended. Creating a new horror cult favorite might just be the most punk rock thing he could have done." Nick Allen of Vulture wrote that Verotika "[follows] in the tradition of Ed Wood and Tommy Wiseau", and noted that Danzig may have unwittingly created "the horror-comedy of the year". Nuno Silva said of the film "she's asleep but the boobs are awake". Alex McLevy of The A.V. Club called the film "funny on a level that most comedies can't achieve. It's that rare fusion of painstakingly expressed love and total lack of ability that deliver the best of bad cinema, and [Danzig] should be proud." In 2026, Verotika was listed at number 4 by Collider in a list of the 10 worst movies of the last 25 years.
