= Larry Wade (disambiguation) =

Larry Wade is an athlete.

Larry Wade may also refer to:

- Larry Wade (musician), who worked with Billy Butler (singer)
- Larry Wade, character in Life Without George

== See also ==
- Larry Wade Carrell
