= Girl Next =

The Next Girl
- Film poster
- Directed by: Larry Wade Carrell
- Written by: Zeph E. Daniel
- Produced by: Loris Curci
- Starring: Lacey Cofran; Marcus Jean Pirae; Paula Marcenaro Solinger; Rachel Alig
- Production companies: Crazed House, Ltd.
- Distributed by: Gravitas Ventures
- Release date: June 18, 2021
- Language: English

Girl Next is a 2021 American horror film directed by Larry Wade Carrell and written by Zeph E. Daniel. It stars Lacey Cofran as Lorian West, a woman who is abducted, drugged, and taken to a secluded Texas ranch where young women are tortured and brainwashed into becoming obedient, living sex dolls that are then sold into the sex trade. Alongside Cofran, the film's cast includes Marcus Jean Pirae, Paula Marcenaro Solinger, and Rachel Alig.

Girl Next was released on June 18, 2021.

== Cast ==
- Lacey Cofran as Lorian West
- Marcus Jean Pirae as Heinrich
- Paula Marcenaro Solinger
- Rachel Alig

== Release ==
In December 2019, Dread Central and Rue Morgue reported that Girl Next was eyeing a May 2020 release. The film was released by Gravitas Ventures on June 18, 2021.

== Reviews ==
- Nerdly Uk: https://www.nerdly.co.uk/category/reviews/movies/
- LePire, Bobby (2021-06-18). "Girl Next". Film Threat.
- "Girl Next | Review". Beyond The Curve. September 22, 2021. Archived from the original on May 23, 2022.
- Horror, All (2021-09-08). "Terror Tuesdays: Girl Next Review (2021)". Morbidly Beautiful.
