= The Ghosts of Garip =

- Turkmen: Kanlı Girdap
- Directed by: Patricio Valladares
- Written by: Barry Keating; Loris Curci
- Produced by: Loris Curci; Baris Abacigil; Fikret Soganci
- Starring: Selma Ergeç; Selim Bayraktar; Gianni Capaldi; Natalia Guslistaya; Larry Wade Carrell
- Cinematography: Pau Mirabet
- Edited by: Patricio Valladares
- Music by: Luc Suarez & Javier Bayón
- Production company: FBR Productions
- Distributed by: Mars Dağıtım
- Release date: July 22, 2016
- Country: Turkey
- Language: English

The Ghosts of Garip (also known as Kanlı Girdap & Vlad's Legacy) directed by Patricio Valladares, is a Turkish Film. Gianni Capaldi and Selma Ergeç star in this found footage horror film. The film was released on 11 July 2016 in Turkey.

== Plot ==
Filmmaker John Gillespie and his crew travel to Turkey to document the legend of Vlad The Impaler, only to find themselves caught up in a centuries-old conspiracy in a village nestled on the outskirts of Istanbul.

== Cast ==
- Selma Ergeç as Nina
- Gianni Capaldi as John
- Selim Bayraktar as Ali
- Natalia Guslistaya as Bella
- Guillermo Iván as Carlos
- Larry Wade Carrell as Brad
- Laia Gonzàlez as Ana
