= Selma Ergeç =

Turkish actress (born 1978)

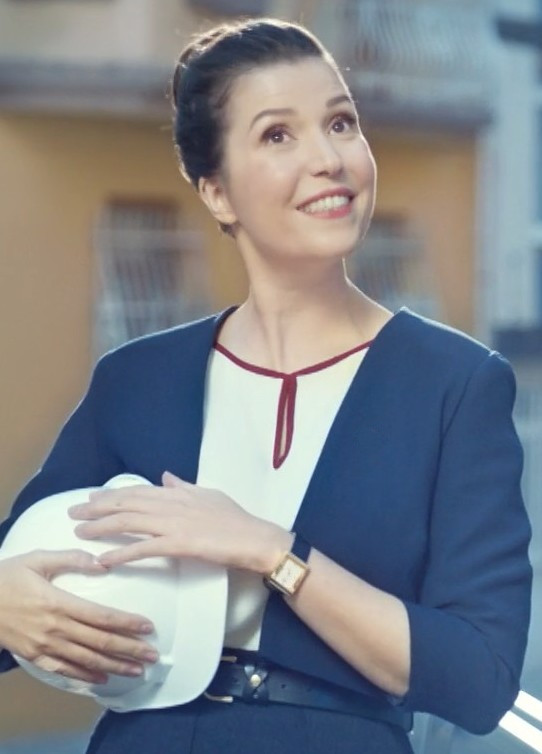
- Ergeç in QNB Finansbank's commercial, October 2016
- Born: 1 November 1978 (age 47); Hamm, North Rhine-Westphalia, West Germany
- Citizenship: Germany; Turkey
- Occupation: Actress
- Years active: 2000–present
- Notable work: Muhteşem Yüzyıl as Hatice Sultan
- Spouse: Can Öz (m. 2015)
- Children: 1
- Website: www.selmaergec.com

Selma Ergeç (Turkish pronunciation: [selˈma ˈæɾɟetʃ]; born 1 November 1978) is a Turkish-German actress, beauty pageant titleholder, model, designer, philologist, psychologist and doctor. She is known for her performance in Kırımlı, Asi, Vatanım Sensin, Yaşamayanlar, Yarım Elma, Gönül İşleri and Muhteşem Yüzyıl as the sister of Sultan Süleyman; Hatice Sultan.

== Early life and career ==
Ergeç was born in Hamm, Germany. Her mother is German and her father is Turkish. She stated in an interview that her paternal family descends from Mahmud II, Sultan of the Ottoman Empire. She studied medicine at Westfalia Wilhems University in Münster for 3 years and psychology and philosophy at the FernUniversität Hagen. She started modelling in 2000.

Her breakthrough role is Ayça in hit comedy series Yarım Elma. She was cast in hit series Asi alongside Tuba Büyüküstün, Murat Yıldırım. She portrayed as the Hatice Sultan in Muhteşem Yüzyıl and as Halide Edib Adıvar. She had leading role in "Gönül İşleri".

She played many languages in historical film Kırımlı based on novel "Korkunç Yıllar" alongside Murat Yıldırım. Her fantasy roles are in "Ses", "Yaşamayanlar", "Atiye". She acted as Uğur Polat's wife in Sis ve Gece, as the teacher in Beş Vakit.

== Personal life ==
She speaks German, English, Turkish, French fluently and Italian with limited proficiency.

On 26 September 2015 Ergeç married Can Öz. The wedding was held in Ergeç's childhood hometown in Germany. The couple's daughter, Yasmin, was born on 8 April 2016.

== Filmography ==
=== Film ===
Year	Film	Role	Notes
2024	Intoxicated by Love	Kera Khatoon	
2015	The Ghosts of Garip	Nina	
2014	Kırımlı: Korkunç Yıllar	Maria Koseckhi	
2013	Senin Hikayen	Esra	
2010	Ses	Derya	
2007	Sis ve Gece	Mine	
2006	Beş Vakit	The teacher	
2006	The Net 2.0	Hotel receptionist	

=== Television ===
Year	Title	Role	Notes
2024	İnci Taneleri	Piraye	Leading role
2021–2023	Camdaki Kız	Selen Koroğlu	Recurring role
2016	Vatanım Sensin	Halide Edib Adıvar	Guest role
2014–2015	Gönül İşleri	Saadet	
2011–2013	Muhteşem Yüzyıl	Hatice Sultan	Main role
2010	Kalp Ağrısı	Azize	14 episodes
2007–2009	Asi	Defne Kozcuoğlu	71 episodes
2005	Şöhret (TV series)	Natalie	
2005	Körfez ateşi		Mini series
2005	Yarım Elma	Ayça	Mini series

=== Digital (internet) ===
Year	Title	Role
2023–2024	The Turkish Detective	Selma Payidar
2018	Immortals	Karmen
2021	The Gift	Umut

=== Music video ===
- "Gidecek Yerim Mi Var" - Emre Altuğ
