= Rachel Alig =

American actress

- Alig in 2025
- Born: 1987 (age 38–39); Kentucky, U.S.
- Education: Dixie Heights High School; University of Cincinnati
- Occupation: Actress
- Years active: 2011–present
- Known for: Bikini Spring Break; Digging to Death; First Blush; The Cleaning Lady; Wives of the Skies
- Notable credits: 12/12/12; Chase; Girl Next; Omaha; Verotika

Rachel Alig is an American actress. She has appeared in independent films including Bikini Spring Break (2012), 12/12/12 (2012), The Cleaning Lady (2018), First Blush (2020), Wives of the Skies (2020), Girl Next (2021), Digging to Death (2021), Family Portrait (2023), and Omaha (2025).

== Early life and education ==
Alig was born to Susan and Jon Alig in 1987. She attended Dixie Heights High School in Kentucky and later studied electronic media at the University of Cincinnati College-Conservatory of Music, graduating with a Bachelor of Fine Arts in 2009.

== Career ==
In the mid-2010s, Alig was cast in lead roles after auditioning through Backstage Magazine. In 2015, she played Olivia in Peter Daskaloff's science-fiction comedy Sex and the Single Alien.

In 2018, Alig starred as Shelly, a scarred maintenance worker who develops an obsession with another woman, in Jon Knautz's psychological horror film The Cleaning Lady. Her performance received positive reviews. Ben Robins of HeyUGuys called Alig "terrific" and praised her portrayal of Shelly's restrained demeanor as the character becomes increasingly dangerous.

Alig starred as Nena in the romantic drama First Blush and later joined the casts of Girl Next, Shadows, Mistake, Our Family Pride, and Lucy Kerr's Family Portrait, which premiered at the Locarno Film Festival.

== Filmography ==
Feature films
| Year | Title | Role | Notes |
|---|---|---|---|
| 2012 | Bikini Spring Break | Alice | |
| 2012 | The Men Next Door | Bambi | |
| 2012 | 12/12/12 | Katherine | |
| 2013 | Officer Down – Dirty Copland (Officer Down) | Becky Rooks | |
| 2013 | Meet the Cleavers – Family Reunions and Other Disasters | Amanda | |
| 2014 | Bachelor Night: Off to Vegas! | Lauren | (Bachelor Night) |
| 2014 | Live Nude Girls | Karma | |
| 2015 | Good Karma Club | Evelyn | |
| 2015 | Sex and the Single Alien | Olivia Delamo | |
| 2015 | At Granny's House | Rebecca Torrance | |
| 2015 | Goddess of Love | Gossip Girl 1 | |
| 2015 | Desperate Losers | Jessica | |
| 2015 | Ghostline | Chelsea Watkins | |
| 2015 | Heavy Makeup | Adele | |
| 2015 | Lori Sheedy, F*** You | Sara Sasson | |
| 2015 | Brotherly Love | Bryce McAllister | |
| 2016 | Last Call at Murray's | Dawn | |
| 2016 | Grace's Room | Billie | |
| 2016 | Natural Born Pranksters | Accomplice #1 | |
| 2016 | Turbulence | Stewardess | |
| 2017 | Varsity Punks | Hot Nurse | |
| 2017 | After School Special | Rachel | |
| 2018 | Happy Cruise | | |
| 2018 | On the Fence | Christy | |
| 2018 | The Cleaning Lady | Shelly | |
| 2018 | Truth | Maria | |
| 2019 | Dadda: Donald and Daisy Duck Adventure | Daisy Duck | |
| 2019 | Coach Stage Stage Coach | Mary | |
| 2019 | Chase | Megan | |
| 2019 | Verotika | Mystery Girl | |
| 2019 | Pigster | | |
| 2020 | First Blush | Nena Weaver | |
| 2021 | Digging to Death | Jessica Van Owen | |
| 2021 | Girl Next | Charlotte | |
| 2021 | The Wet Ones | Spider Baby | |
| 2021 | The Handler | Jane Dune | |
| 2021 | Self-Isolated | Dr. Emily Fields | |
| 2022 | Shadows | Michelle | |
| 2022 | Friends Unlimited | Natalie Nierling | |
| 2023 | Mia | Mia Bowl | |
| 2023 | Target List | Donna Sawyer | |
| 2023 | Buckle Up | Lorna | |
| 2023 | Family Portrait | Annabelle | |
| 2023 | Et Tu | Nadine | |
| 2023 | Noah's Arch | Mrs. Taylor | |
| 2023 | A Warrior's Soul | Danielle Romano | |
| 2024 | King Saud | Carlucci | |
| 2024 | Once Upon a Time in Hollyweird | | |
| 2024 | Saint Nick | Diane | |
| 2024 | Chateau | Fleur | |
| 2025 | Bring It All Back Home | Charlotte | |
| 2025 | Found Footage: The Making of The Patterson Project | Danielle | |
| 2025 | Candy Lady | Grace | |
| 2025 | Omaha | Sheriff | |
| 2025 | Circumcision | Sister | |
| 2025 | Invisible | Heather | |
| 2026 | Our Family Pride | Max Scott | |
| TBA | Mistake | | By Honey Lauren |

Short films
| Year | Title | Role | Notes |
|---|---|---|---|
| 2011 | Axe: Dirtcathlon | | |
| 2011 | Beverly Hills Ghost Club | | |
| 2011 | Rope | | |
| 2013 | Morgue | | |
| 2013 | Insomniac Theatre | | |
| 2014 | The Visitors | | |
| 2015 | Entice | | |
| 2015 | The Observer | | |
| 2015 | Shoefiti | | |
| 2016 | The Cheerleader | | |
| 2016 | Hollywood Pulp | | |
| 2016 | Cuck | | |
| 2017 | Turra: Gun Angel | | |
| 2017 | Yesterday is Tomorrow | | |
| 2017 | I Am | | |
| 2018 | 12.5 | | |
| 2018 | Mr. Chuckles | | |
| 2018 | Cafe Lisbon | | |
| 2019 | The Lost Sword | Lisa | |
| 2019 | Black Widow | | |
| 2020 | Wives of the Skies | Fran | |
| 2020 | Wolf on a Leash | | |
| 2021 | Better Now | | |
| 2021 | From Under the Bridge: When Bullies Become Trolls | | |
| 2021 | Killjoy | | |
| 2021 | Spread | | |
| 2022 | Abi's Monster | | |
| 2023 | Into the Thicket | | |
| 2023 | Missing Daughters | | |
| 2023 | A Close Encounter | | |

Television
| Year | Title | Role | Notes |
|---|---|---|---|
| 2011 | Pocket Dial | | (TV series, episode 1x02) |
| 2012 | Fatal Encounters | | (TV documentary series, episode 1x11) |
| 2012 | Handsome Police | | (TV series, episode 1x02) |
| 2012 | The Elisted | | TV movie |
| 2012 | GCPD: Major Crimes Unit | | (TV series) |
| 2012 | La Verdad: Beginnings | | (TV series, 3 episodes) |
| 2013 | Thirtyish | | TV movie |
| 2014 | OMG! EMT! | | (TV series, episode 1x01) |
| 2014 | The Division | | (TV series, episode 1x04) |
| 2014 | Gridlocked | | (TV series) |
| 2014 | Kingdom | | (TV series, episode 1x01) |
| 2014 | Hope: The Last Paladin | | (TV series, episode 1x01) |
| 2015 | My Embarrassing Sex Accident | | (Sex Sent Me to the ER, TV documentary series, episode 1x36) |
| 2015 | Codes and Conspiracies | | (TV documentary series, episode 2x04) |
| 2015 | My Crazy Ex | | (TV series, 1 episode) |
| 2015 | Chronology of Horror | | (Murder Book, TV documentary series, episode 2x01) |
| 2015 | Carbon Dating | | (TV series, 2 episodes) |
| 2016 | #WineLine | | (TV series, episode 1x03) |
| 2017 | Kill, Die, Laugh | | (TV series, episode 1x03) |
| 2017 | Magic Funhouse! | | (TV series, episode 2x01) |
| 2017 | Dan Is Dead | | (TV series, episode 1x08) |
| 2017 | Fan Club – News Done Right! | | (TV series, 82 episodes, various roles) |
| 2018 | Department of Offense | | (TV series, episode 1x06) |
| 2018 | Meanwhile in the Barracks | | (TV series, episode 1x06) |
| 2018 | The Shop | Corporal Rachel Foxx | (TV series, 6 episodes) |
| 2018 | Polygon Ore | | (TV series) |
| 2019 | This Giant Beast That is the Global Economy | | (TV documentary series, Episode 1x07) |
| 2019 | Half Off Heroes | | (TV movie) |
| 2019 | The Bet | | (TV series, 6 episodes) |
| 2019 | I'm Offended | | TV movie |
| 2020 | Outmatched | | (TV series, episode 1x09) |
| 2020 | Wild West Chronicles | | (TV series, episode 1x12) |
| 2020 | Bulge Bracket | | (TV series, 2 episodes) |
| 2020 | Attorneys at Flaw | | TV movie |
| 2020 | Meanwhile in the Field | | (TV series, 2 episodes) |
| 2020 | The Eric Andre Show | | (TV series, episode 5x10) |
| 2020 | The Rep | | TV movie |
| 2020 | How to Fail: Job Interviews | | (miniseries, 16 episodes) |
| 2021 | Adventures of Rahul | | (miniseries) |
| 2023 | Dhar Mann | | (TV series, 7 episodes, various roles) |
| 2023 | Gahan Wilson's Tales of Horror | | (TV series, episode 1x01) |
| 2023 | Dhar Mann Bonus | | (miniseries, 10 episodes) |
| 2024 | Forbidden Bonds with My Brothers | | (miniseries) |
| 2024 | Rent a DI | | (TV series, episode 1x13) |
