= XPW Television Championship =

Professional wrestling championship

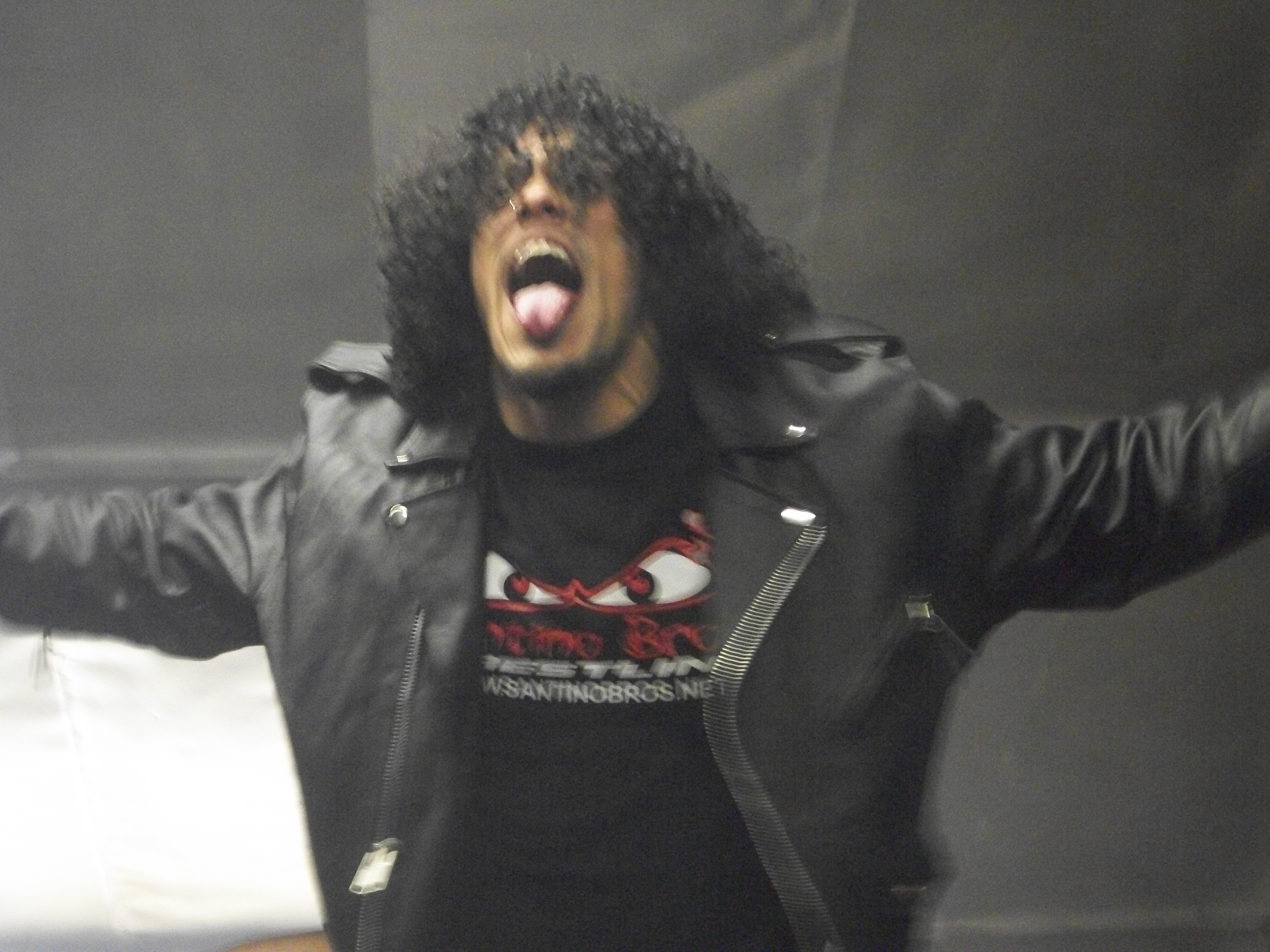
- Joey Munoz, wrestling as "Kaos", was the first Television Champion

Details
- Promotion: Xtreme Pro Wrestling
- Date established: August 25, 2001
- Date retired: March 8, 2003
Statistics
- First champion: Kaos
- Most reigns: Kaos, X (1 reign each)
- Longest reign: Kaos (553 days)
- Shortest reign: X (8 days)
- Oldest champion: X
- Youngest champion: Kaos

The XPW Television Championship was introduced in 2001 by Xtreme Pro Wrestling and the champion was decided in a one night tournament at XPW's Damage Inc. event, which featured competitors such as Konnan, Johnny Webb, Kid Kaos, Dynamite D and Vic Grimes.

There would only be two XPW Television Champions, as Kaos held the championship for a year and a half. Kaos would go on to successfully defend the XPW Television Championship against the likes of Psicosis, Nosawa, Chris Hamrick, Danny Doring, Jonny Storm, and Shark Boy.

== Damage Inc. Tournament ==
First Round
Kaos
The Enterprise
Dynamite D
Kronus
Konnan
"White Trash" Johnny Webb
Vicious Vic Grimes
"RCG" Leroy

Semifinals
Kaos
Dynamite D
Konnan
Vicious Vic Grimes

Final
Kaos (w. Supreme)
Konnan (w. Psicosis)

== Title history ==
Key

Symbol	Meaning
No.	The overall championship reign
Reign	The reign number for the specific wrestler listed.
Event	The event in which the championship changed hands

#	Wrestler	Reign	Date	Days held	Location	Event	Notes	Ref.
1	Kaos	1	August 25, 2001	552	Los Angeles, California	XPW Damage Inc.	Defeated Konnan in a tournament final to become the first champion.	
2	X	1	February 28, 2003	8	North Hills, California	XPW My Bloody Valentine Tour 2003 - day 1		
-	Deactivated	-	March 8, 2003	N/A	N/A	N/A	XPW closed and title was abandoned	

== See also ==
- Xtreme Pro Wrestling
