= Chinese prostitution in Paris =

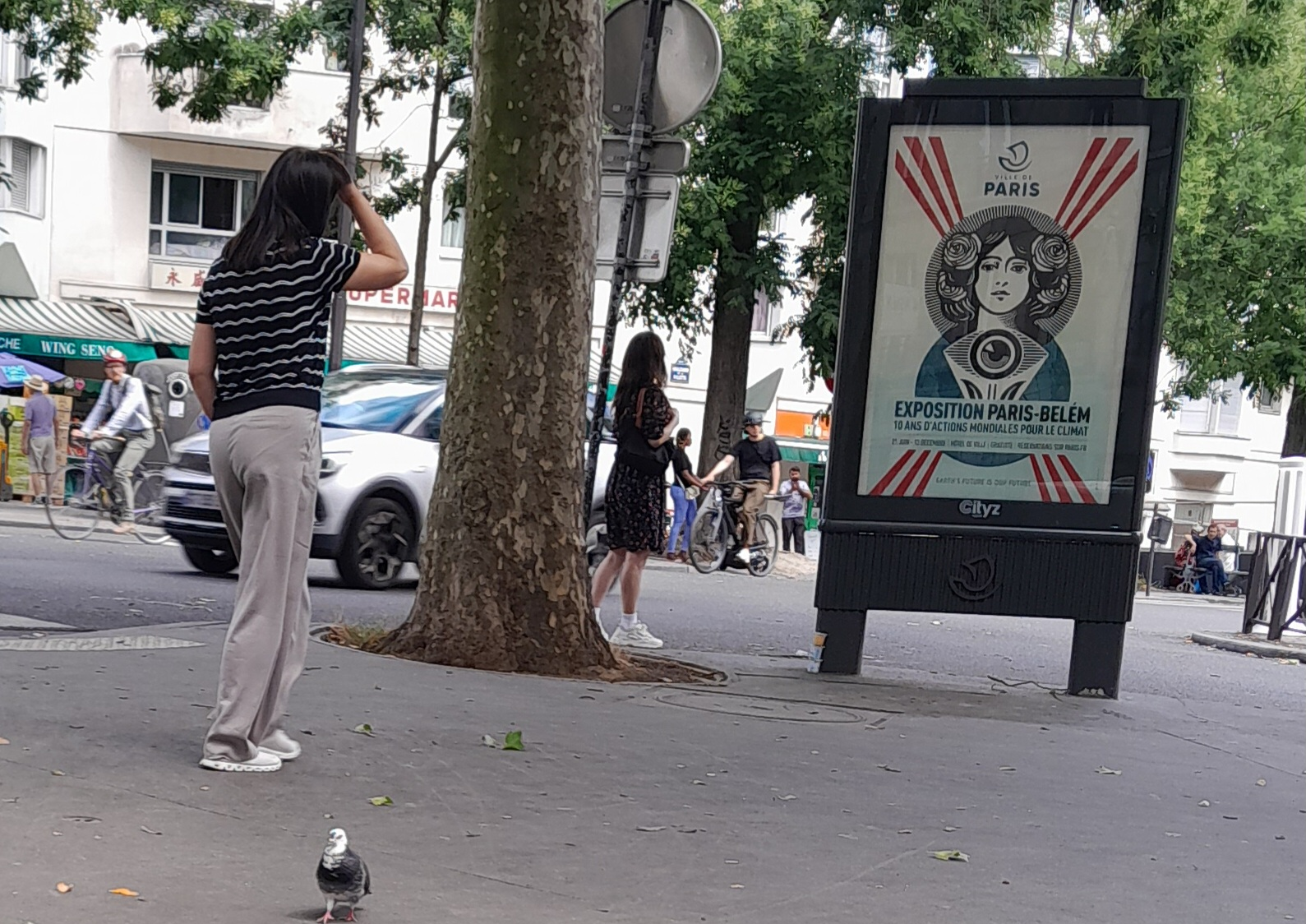
Chinese prostitute in Paris (June 2025).

Chinese prostitution in Paris has developed since the late 1990s. Prostitutes of Chinese origin work mainly on the streets of some neighbourhoods, where they are nicknamed les marcheuses (the walkers), but also in massage parlours or through the internet. In 2016, Médecins du Monde estimated that there were 1,450 Chinese prostitutes in Paris.

== Background ==
The Chinese diaspora in France came mainly from three different waves of migration. At the beginning of the last century the first Chinese migration began, the migrants coming mainly from the vicinity of the city of Wenzhou. This migration was reactivated in the 1980s. These migrants in France developed a vast network of companies and put in place effective support for newcomers from the same region. In the 1970s, political refugees from French Indochina, escaping the violence in Vietnam, Laos and Cambodia were welcomed into the country. Finally, from the end of the 1990s, new migrants have arrived from North and Northeast China, mostly women over the age of forty. Without support and facing isolation, these new migrants are limited to low income-generating activities in precarious conditions.

== History ==
=== Origin of Chinese Prostitutes ===
According to Médecins du Monde, there were around 500 in Chinese prostitutes Paris in 2009, by 2016 the figure had risen to 1,450.

The sociologist Florence Lévy indicates that the arrival of Chinese women dates from the end of the 1990s. They originated mainly from North China (Dongbei). Most of the Chinese are mothers who worked for large state enterprises but lost their jobs during the privatisation wave of the 2000s. When they arrive in France, they usually have a visa but become illegal immigrants when it expires. These migrants must quickly repay loans, usually to family members, to reach France (air tickets, visa, smuggler ...). The choice of prostitution is made after working in low-paying jobs, or a period of unemployment. Some turn to prostitution to pay for their children's education in China or to support their Chinese family.

=== Types of prostitution ===
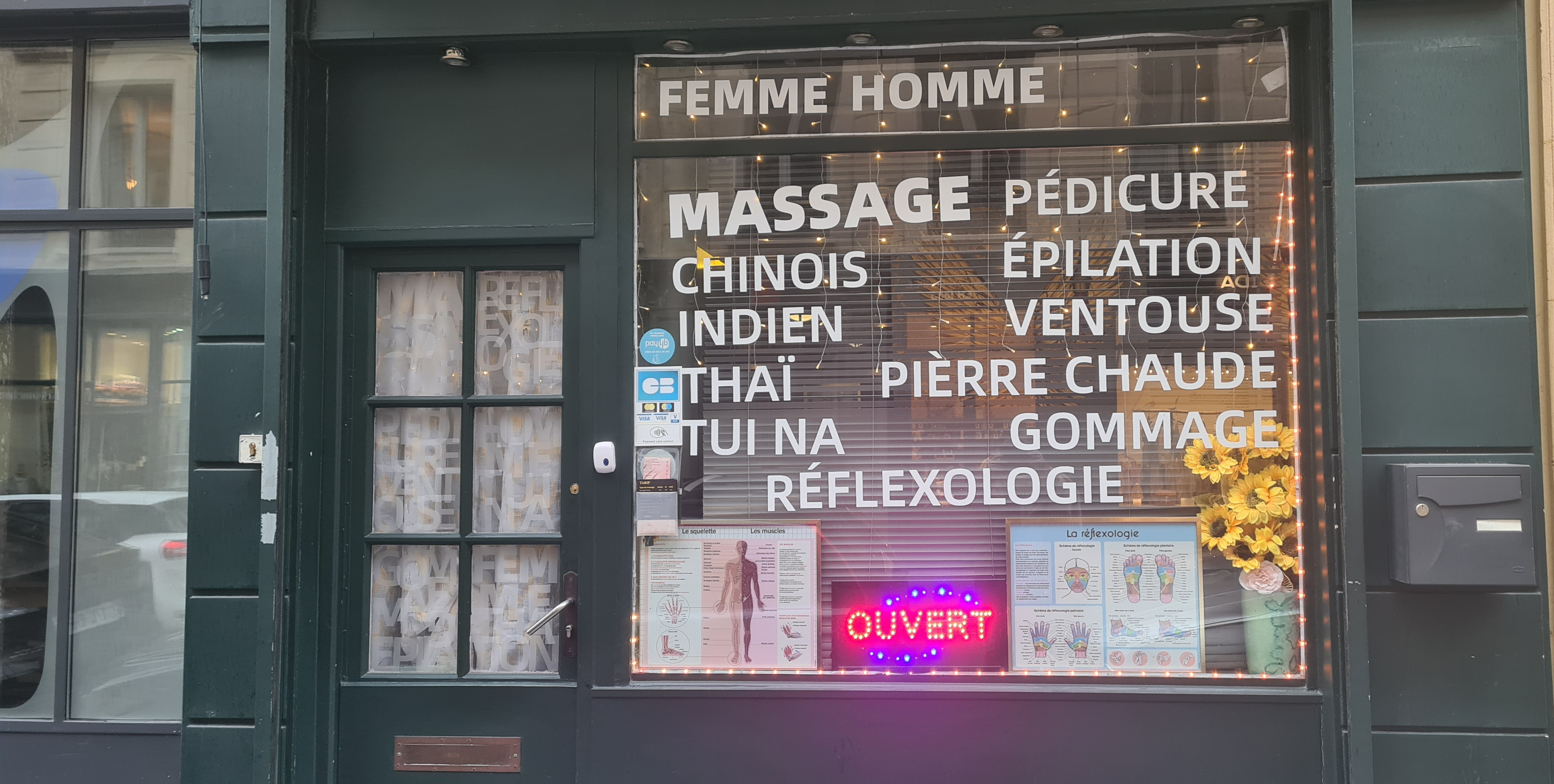
Massage parlor in Paris.

The Chinese prostitutes work mainly on the sidewalks of Strasbourg - Saint-Denis (a traditional prostitution neighbourhood in Paris), in the district of Belleville, and less visible in the triangle of Choisy (between the avenue de Choisy, avenue d'Ivry and the boulevard Masséna).

Others work in massage parlours, which are scattered throughout the whole of Paris. In 2015, according to the Police Prefecture, there were 575 massage parlours in Paris, and at least 300 of them were places of prostitution, where "erotic massages" were offered. In July 2015, Nathalie Kosciusko-Morizet told the Paris Council of "the reappearance of mini maisons closes that hide hundreds of Asian prostitutes in slavery".

With the law on the criminalisation of customers in 2016, Chinese prostitutes have turned to working via internet or by telephone. According to Médecins du Monde, "All the women we work with testify to the fact that this law has made their work more difficult and more dangerous."

=== Organised prostitution ===
A survey by Médecins du Monde in 2013 found although Chinese sex workers in Paris were faced with violence, but were not controlled by prostitution networks or pimps. They chose this activity because of economic obligations. However, Christian Kalck, Commissioner of the Brigade de répression du proxénétisme (BRP), maintained there are many networks around these Chinese prostitutes: "Making money on the back of a prostitute, whatever the means, is to be a pimp." Similarly those who use the internet to prostitute themselves, pay intermediaries.

=== Support ===
In 2002, Médecins du Monde created the Lotus Bus, a health and safety information service for Chinese prostitutes in Paris. A Chinese/French bilingual booklet was written for Chinese prostitutes in Paris in 2009. It gives practical information useful to prostitutes: signs of sexually transmitted infections, explanations of the methods of prevention, the follow-up techniques after the break of a condom and recommends regular screenings.

In 2014, a specific association, les Roses d'Acier, was set up to defend the rights of Chinese prostitutes.

== See also ==
- Prostitution in Paris
- Chinese community in Paris
- Bitter Flowers (2017 film)

== Bibliography ==
- Bail, Hélène Le (1 December 2015). "Mobilisation de femmes chinoises migrantes se prostituant à Paris. De l'invisibilité à l'action collective". Genre, Sexualité & Société (in French) (14). doi:10.4000/gss.3679. ISSN 2104-3736.
- Guillon, Michelle (1998). "The Chinese and Chinese Districts in Paris". In Sinn, Elizabeth (ed.). The Last Half Century of Chinese Overseas: The Music, Poetry and Life of Tsar Teh-yun. Hong Kong University Press. ISBN 9789622094468.
- Lévy, Florence (2012). "La migration des Chinoises du Nord : une alternative genrée ?". Perspectives Chinoises. 1 (4): 47–55.
- Lévy, Florence; Lieber, Marylène (2009). "La sexualité comme ressource migratoire". Revue Française de Sociologie. 50 (4): 719. doi:10.3917/rfs.504.0719.
