= Society (film) =

1989 film by Brian Yuzna

- Theatrical release poster
- Directed by: Brian Yuzna
- Written by: Woody Keith; Rick Fry
- Produced by: Keith Walley
- Starring: Billy Warlock; Devin DeVasquez; Evan Richards; Ben Meyerson
- Cinematography: Rick Fichter
- Edited by: Peter Teshner
- Music by: Mark Ryder; Phil Davies
- Distributed by: Wild Street Pictures
- Release dates: May 13, 1989 (Cannes); February 28, 1992 (United States)
- Running time: 99 minutes
- Country: United States
- Language: English

Society is a 1989 American body horror film directed by Brian Yuzna in his directorial debut from a screenplay by Woody Keith and Rick Fry. It stars Billy Warlock as a teenager in Beverly Hills who begins to suspect that his wealthy parents are part of a gruesome cult made up of the social elite.

Society was originally conceived as a more conventional slasher, featuring a cult of social elitists who engage in human sacrifice. The screenplay was reshaped by Yuzna, who introduced body horror elements such as the reveal of the cult being a shapeshifting species that can literally feed on the lower classes, a concept he based on nightmares he had experienced. The film was shot in California in 1988 with Screaming Mad George as the special effects designer.

The film screened at the 1989 Cannes Film Festival, but went unreleased in the United States until 1992. It failed commercially, though it received critical acclaim from international audiences. In the years since its release, the film has garnered a cult following and is regarded as influential in body horror.

== Plot ==
Bill lives with his parents and sister in a mansion in Beverly Hills, California. He tells his therapist Dr. Cleveland that he does not trust his rich family. When his sister's ex-boyfriend David gives him a surreptitiously recorded audio tape of what sounds like his family engaged in a murderous orgy, Bill begins to suspect that his feelings are justified. Bill gives the tape to Dr. Cleveland, but when he later plays it back, the audio has changed to his sister's debutante party. When Bill attempts to meet David to obtain another copy, he finds an ambulance and police officers gathered around David's crashed van. A body is placed into the back of the ambulance, but Bill is prevented from seeing its face.

Bill attends a party hosted by his rich classmate Ted Ferguson, who confirms that the first tape was real. Angry and confused, Bill leaves the party with Clarissa, a beautiful girl he had been admiring. The next day, Bill confronts his parents and sister. At David's funeral, Bill and his friend Milo discover that David's corpse may be fake. Bill is contacted by Martin, his rival for the high school presidency. At their arranged meeting, Bill discovers Martin with his throat slashed. When he returns with the police, Martin's body is gone. Martin shows up at school the next day, alive and well. When Bill arrives at home, he confronts his family again, but they drug him with the help of Dr. Cleveland. As Milo trails him, Bill is taken to a hospital; he awakens and pulls a curtain down, thinking he hears David crying out, but discovers nothing is there. Milo and Clarissa try to warn him, but he drives back to his house.

At home, Bill finds a large formal party occurring. Dr. Cleveland reveals that Bill's family and their friends, all members of the social elite, are actually an entirely different species from Bill, who was adopted and therefore not part of their bloodline. To demonstrate, they bring in a still-living David as a human sacrifice. The wealthy party guests strip to their underwear and begin "shunting", a phenomenon in which they physically deform their bodies and meld with each other into a near-amorphous mass of flesh. As the orgiastic shunt continues, the guests feast on the nutrients from David's body, gruesomely absorbing and killing him. Their intention is to do the same to Bill, but he escapes and runs around the house, where he finds his parents and sister engaged in similar activities.

Preparing Bill for the shunt, the cult members engage him in a fight with Ted, who pummels him repeatedly despite Clarissa's cries for him to stop. With Bill incapacitated, Ted prepares to feast on him, but Bill manages to kill him by reaching inside his body mid-shunt and pulling his body inside out. Bill escapes with the help of Milo and Clarissa, who is also a member of the other species, but has betrayed them as she has fallen in love with Bill. The three of them flee the house as the cult members continue their party.

== Cast ==
- Billy Warlock as William "Bill" Whitney
- Connie Danese as Nan Whitney
- Ben Slack as Dr. Cleveland
- Evan Richards as Milo
- Patrice Jennings as Jenny Whitney
- Tim Bartell as David Blanchard
- Charles Lucia as Jim Whitney
- Heidi Kozak as Shauna
- Brian Bremer as Martin Petrie
- Ben Meyerson as Ted Ferguson
- Devin DeVasquez as Clarissa Carlyn
- Maria Claire as Sally
- Conan Yuzna as Jason
- Jason Williams as Jason's Friend
- Pamela Matheson as Mrs. Carlyn
- David Wiley as Judge Carter

== Themes ==
Author Jon Towlson identifies political themes imported from paranoid science fiction thrillers, such as Invasion of the Body Snatchers and Invaders from Mars. Yuzna later cited the film's mix of paranoia, black humor, satire, and gore as alienating mainstream audiences.

== Production ==
=== Development ===
After having several of his productions fail for lack of finding a director, Brian Yuzna decided to move into directing. As producer of Re-Animator, he held the rights to a sequel and knew he could find financing. He used this as leverage for a two-picture deal, the first of which became Society. Yuzna said that he wanted the safety of having two pictures to establish himself as a successful director. Society's script appealed to Yuzna partly because it was thematically similar to a failed project he had begun with Dan O'Bannon.

The original screenplay for the film by Woody Keith and Rick Fry resembled a more traditional slasher film that culminated in a climax involving a straightforward religious cult of the elite who sacrifice those from lower social classes. Yuzna chose to alter Keith and Fry's script, instead reshaping the cult into an alternate species of humans who literally feed on the lower classes.

=== Special effects ===
The production company introduced him to Screaming Mad George, who they knew to also be interested in surreal gore. For the film's most surreal and gory sequence, the "shunting," Yuzna based it on his nightmares. The sequence was further inspired by The Great Masturbator, a Salvador Dalí painting.

== Release ==
Society screened at the Cannes Film Festival on May 13, 1989, and also screened at the Shock Around the Clock Film Festival in London the same year. For its British release, Society was marketed in Video Trade Weekly with a picture of the film's theatrical premiere. Mark Kermode called this "stupid yet brilliant", as it demonstrated that the distributor did not know how to market the film properly but also showed recognition that traditional marketing for a genre film was irrelevant.

=== Home media ===
Anchor Bay Entertainment released Society on DVD in 2002. The following year, Anchor Bay issued the film again on DVD as a double feature paired with Spontaneous Combustion (1990).

Arrow Video released a limited edition Blu-ray in the United Kingdom on June 8 and in the US on June 9, 2015. It includes new interviews and artwork, a comic book sequel, and a music video by Screaming Mad George. The Blu-ray release totaled sales of $1,096,955.

== Reception ==
=== Critical response ===
Society was a critical success in Europe, but was shelved for three years before getting a release in the United States. Said director Yuzna in an interview: "I think Europeans are more willing to accept the ideas that are in a movie. That's why for example Society did really well in Europe and in the US did nothing, where it was a big joke. And I think it's because they responded to the ideas in there. I was totally having fun with them, but they are there nonetheless."

Variety described it as "an extremely pretentious, obnoxious horror film that unsuccessfully attempts to introduce kinky sexual elements into extravagant makeup effects". Michael Wilmington of the Los Angeles Times wrote, "No one who sees the last half-hour of this movie will ever forget it—though quite a few may want to." Wilmington likened the film's themes and message to that of Jonathan Swift's 1729 satirical essay A Modest Proposal.

Marc Savlov of The Austin Chronicle wrote that the British press, who gave the film positive reviews, overrated it and stated that it would not play well to American audiences.

==== Retrospective ====
Tom Tunney of Empire rated the film 4 out of 5 stars and wrote: "Way ahead of its time, this is a balls-out satire on the disgraceful layers that can lurk just beneath the Avon surface. This is anti-Ferris Bueller and fiendishly funny."

In the early 2010s, Time Out London conducted a poll with several authors, directors, actors, and critics who have worked within the horror genre to vote for their top horror films. Society placed at number 95 on their top 100 list. Bartlomiej Paszylk wrote in The Pleasure and Pain of Cult Horror Films that the film has "one of the craziest and most disgusting endings in movie history".

On the review aggregator website Rotten Tomatoes, Society holds a 71% approval rating based on 17 reviews. Metacritic, which uses a weighted average, assigned the film a score of 50 out of 100, based on 10 critics, indicating "mixed or average" reviews.

=== Accolades ===
In 1990, Society won the Silver Raven award for "Best Make-Up" at the Brussels International Festival of Fantasy Film.

== Related works ==
Scottish comic book company Rough Cut Comics acquired the comic book rights to Society in 2002, producing an official sequel. The comic book series returned in 2003 with Society: Party Animal by writer Colin Barr and artists Shelby Robertson (issue 1) and Neill Cameron (issue 2).

A sequel, Society 2: Body Modification, was in development as of 2013, with a script written by Stephan Biro.

== Sources ==
- Kermode, Mark (2011). The Good, The Bad and The Multiplex. New York City, New York: Random House. pp. 92–93. ISBN 978-1-409-02349-4.
- Towlson, Jon (2014). Subversive Horror Cinema. Jefferson, North Carolina: McFarland. ISBN 978-0-786-47469-1.
- Paszylk, Bartlomiej (2009). The Pleasure and Pain of Cult Horror Films: An Historical Survey. Jefferson, North Carolina: McFarland. ISBN 978-0-786-45327-6.
