= Zeph E. Daniel =

Screenwriter, film director and producer

- Born: Willard Woodward Keith lll
- Other name: Woody Keith
- Occupations: Screenwriter; film director; producer
- Known for: Screenwriting, Director, Producer, Talkshow Host and Musician and Producer.
- Notable work: Film: Society (1989), Dementia (1999), Girl Next (2021), Quantum Devil (2023) and Angel's Tide (1995). The Zeph Report Podcast and the books Glassbackwards (2003 fiction)and Girl Next (2023 fiction). Music: "Broken Mirror" (solo), "Gangstalked" (DCP), "Here We Are" (w/ Patricia BK Daniel), "dEVILution" (w/ Kellie Rowley).
- Spouse: Patricia BK Daniel (m.2004-present)
- Children: Francesca Keith 1990-2018
- Website: https://crazedhouse.com/

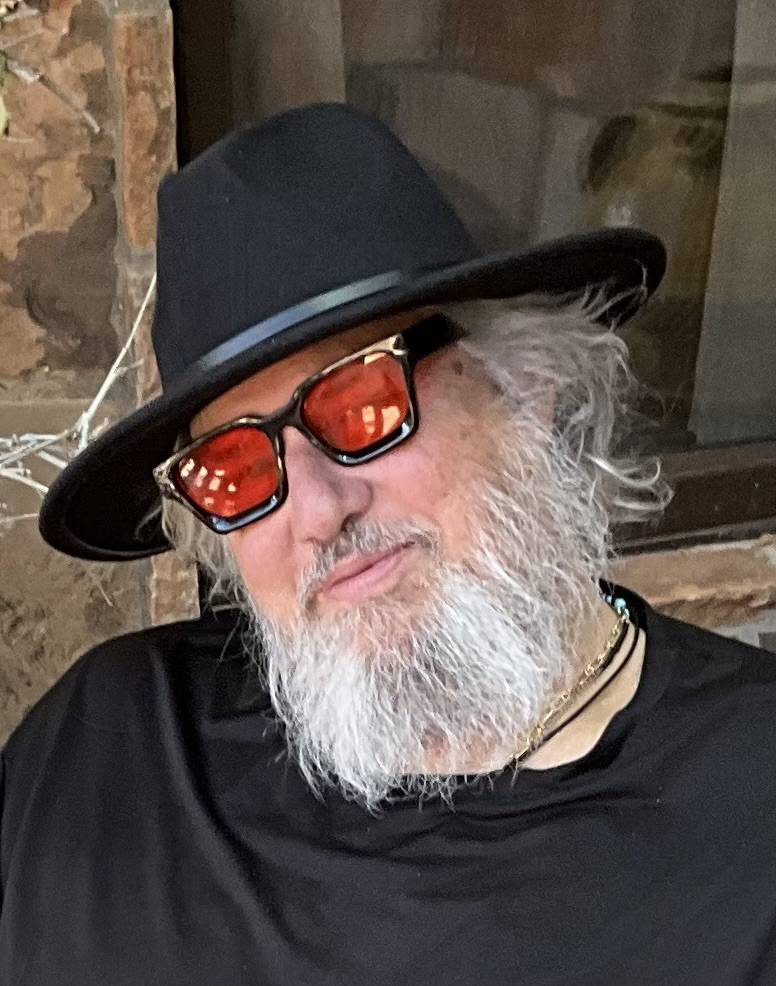
Zeph E. Daniel (2024)

Zeph E. Daniel (formerly known as Woody Keith) is an American screenwriter, film director, producer, musician and award-winning music producer. He is known for conceiving and co-writing the 1989 American body horror film Society, as well as the 1990 film Bride of Re-Animator, with Rick Fry. Daniel also wrote Silent Night, Deadly Night 4: Initiation (1990).

Following the death of his daughter Francesca Keith (1990–2018), Daniel was motivated to get back into filmmaking. He co-founded the movie production company Crazed House. He has co-produced and co-wrote the films Girl Next (2021) and The Quantum Devil. Crazed House also re-mastered his 1995 film Angel's Tide. A story of a dying woman who is in denial about her health condition. Crazed House Re-mastered Zeph Daniel's 1999, thriller Transferance. A story of a beautiful heiress recovering from a mental breakdown and the unhealthy bond with her nurse.

Daniel is featured in 2023 documentary film The Darkside of Society. An inside look at the 1989 cult classic Society and the events that led to him writing the script.

== Podcast ==
Daniel hosts the podcast The Zeph Report. For over 20 years The Zeph Report has been reporting on spiritual, political and philosophical observations.

== Books ==
- Lamb (June 2002) Fiction. An end-times prophetic tale.
- Glass Backwards] (June 2003) Fiction. A satanic unseen reality exposed.
- Girl Next] (2023) Fiction. Daniel wrote the book Girl Next two years after the film was released. He realized that more needed to be said about the techniques used to create a MK Ultra slave.

== Music ==
Daniel's award-winning music and collaborations can be found in films, music videos and on The Zeph Report. The complete catalog of hundreds of titles can be found on the Zeph Daniel SoundCloud page. Music videos and Zeph Report video clips can be found on the fan page Z Media Worldwide.

== Filmography ==
=== Credited as Woody Keith ===
Year	Title	Director	Writer	Producer	Notes	Ref(s)
1989	Society		Yes			
1990	Bride of Re-Animator		Yes			
1990	Silent Night, Deadly Night 4: Initiation		Yes		Direct-to-video	
1995	Angel's Tide	Yes	Yes			
1999	Dementia	Yes	Yes	Yes		

=== Credited as Zeph Daniel ===
Year	Title	Director	Writer	Producer	Cast
2021	Girl Next		Yes	Yes	
2023	Quantum Devil		Yes	Yes	
2023	The Darkside of Society				Yes
2025	Transference	Yes	Yes	Yes	

=== Awards ===
Festival	Film	Categories
Milan Gold Awards	Girl Next	Gold Award Screenplay
Costa Brava	Girl Next	Best Producer
Matrix Film Festival	Girl Next	Best Producer
Paradise Film Festival	Girl Next	Best Executive Producer
Into the Wild Film Festival	Girl Next	Best Producer
Milan Gold Awards	Girl Next	Gold Award - Screenplay
Gothamite Film Award	Angel's Tide	Best Director
Golden Bridge Istanbul Film Festival	Angel's Tide	Best Director Best Feature Film
MEGAFLIX Film Festival	Angel's Tide	Best Feature Film
Folkestone Film Festival	Angel's Tide	Best dark Comedy
Mindfield Film Festival	Angel's Tide	Best Feature Film Best Director Best Screenplay
South Film and Arts Academy Festival	Angel's Tide	Best Indie Feature Film
Gothamite Award	Angel's Tide	Best Director Best Feature Film
Five Continents International Film Festival	Angel's Tide	Best Fantasy Feature Film Special Mention Best Director Feature Film and Art Direction
Athens International Film Festival	Angel's Tide	Best feature Film
Caravan International Film Festival	Angel's Tide	Best Narrative Feature
Crown Point International Film Festival	Angel's Tide	Best Drama Feature
Avignon International Film festival	Angel's Tide	Best Feature film
Europa Film Festival	Angel's Tide	Best Fantasy Feature
Motion Picture Academy (IMPA)	Angel's Tide	Best Film
Motion Pictures International Film Festival	Angel's Tide	Best Screenplay
Cosmo Genetics Film Festival	Angel's Tide	Best Director
Machu Picchu Film Festival	Angel's Tide	Best Director
American Motion Pictures Festival	Transferance	Best Director
Around International Film Festival	Transferance	Best Feature
Peephole Filmfest	Transferance	Feature Film, Best Experimental Feature Film
Mindfield Film Festival	Transferance	Best Director, Best Screenplay,
MEI AWARDS	Transferance	Best Feature Film
Indo Dubai International Film Festival	Transferance	Best International Feature
Oblivion Frames Festival	Transferance	Best Director & Audience Choice
