= Sean Waltman =

American professional wrestler (born 1972)

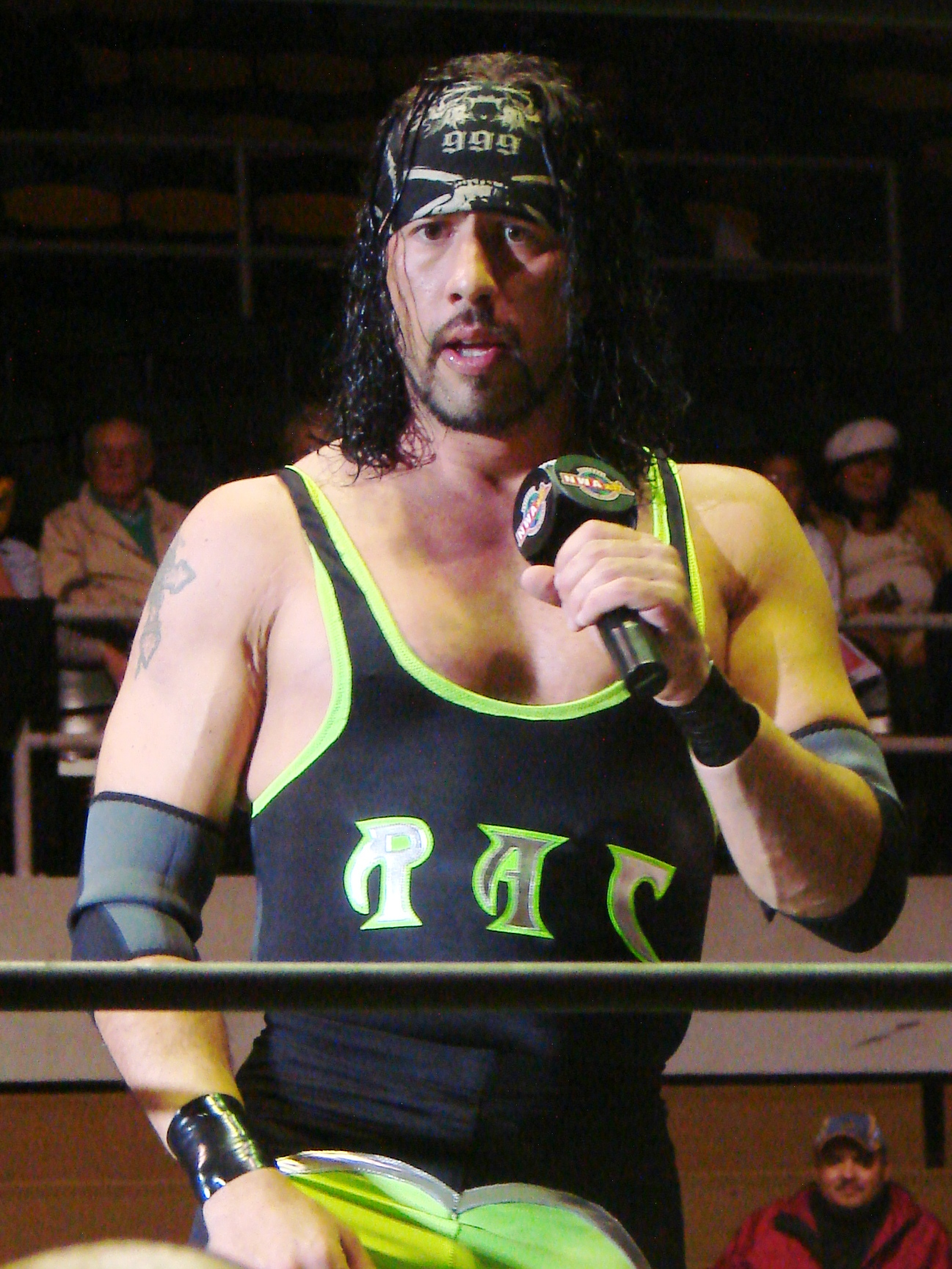
- Waltman in 2007

Personal information
- Born: Sean Michael Waltman; July 13, 1972 (age 54) Minneapolis, Minnesota, U.S.
- Spouse: Terry Waltman (m. 1994; div. 2002)
- Children: 2

Professional wrestling career
- Ring name(s): The 1–2–3 Kid; 6-Pac; The Cannonball Kid; The Kamikaze Kid; The Kid; The Lightning Kid; Pac; Sean Waltman; Syxx; Syxx-Pac; X X-Pac "X-Pac" Sean Waltman
- Billed height: 6 ft 1 in (185 cm)
- Billed weight: 212 lb (96 kg)
- Billed from: Minneapolis, Minnesota
- Trained by: Eddie Sharkey; Boris Malenko
- Debut: 1989
- Retired: March 31, 2022

Sean Michael Waltman (born July 13, 1972) is an American retired professional wrestler. He is signed to WWE under a legends contract. He is best known for his appearances for the World Wrestling Federation (WWF, now WWE) under the ring names 1–2–3 Kid and X-Pac; World Championship Wrestling (WCW) as Syxx; and NWA Total Nonstop Action (NWA-TNA) as Syxx-Pac and under his real name.

Waltman began his career in the WWF in 1993, where he performed under several monikers as a jobber, until he was branded the 1-2-3 Kid after an upset victory over Razor Ramon on Raw. As 1-2-3 Kid, he held the WWF Tag Team Championship twice. During this time, he was part of The Kliq, a backstage group that was known for their influence on WWF storylines in the 1990s.

During the Monday Night War, Waltman left the WWF in 1996 to join Kliq members Kevin Nash and Scott Hall (formerly known as Diesel and Razor Ramon) as Syxx in WCW, and held the WCW World Tag Team Championship with them as part of the New World Order (nWo), as well as becoming a one-time WCW Cruiserweight Champion. After being released from WCW in 1998, he returned to the WWF during its Attitude Era, where he was re-branded as D-Generation X (DX) member X-Pac and held the WWF Light Heavyweight Championship and WWF European Championship twice each, while also holding the WWF Tag Team Championship two more times while paired with Kane. After WCW went out of business in 2001, X-Pac held the WCW Cruiserweight and WWF Light Heavyweight Championships simultaneously during The Invasion, before departing the company after a brief nWo reunion the following year. He subsequently performed sporadically for several promotions, notably TNA (where he became a one-time TNA X Division Champion and was a member of The Band), and on the independent circuit.

Waltman has won a dozen championships between WWE, WCW, and TNA, the majority being cruiserweight and tag team titles. He is the only wrestler to have held the TNA X Division Championship, the WCW Cruiserweight Championship, and the WWF Light Heavyweight Championship. He was the final WWF Light Heavyweight Champion before the title was retired in favor of the Cruiserweight Championship he simultaneously held. He is recognized by WWE as the only wrestler to have been "an active member of both the nWo and DX during their heydays" in the 1990s. Additionally, he is a two-time WWE Hall of Fame inductee and the only inductee to be inducted two years in a row (2019 and 2020) as a member of DX and the nWo respectively.

== Early life ==
Sean Michael Waltman was born in Minneapolis on July 13, 1972. He had a self-described troubled childhood. He was raised by a single mother and has called himself "unsupervised from age five". He claimed he was molested several times as a child. He joined his school wrestling team in ninth grade, but quickly quit when they told him he needed to cut his hair in order to wrestle. He soon dropped out of school entirely. A love of professional wrestling and limited career opportunities led to him working in local wrestling promotions for free, setting up rings and doing other odd jobs before eventually wrestling himself.

== Professional wrestling career ==
=== Early career (1989–1993) ===
After training under Boris Malenko, Joe Malenko, Masami Soronaka, and Karl Gotch, Waltman began his career as "The Lightning Kid". He worked his way through various independent promotions, including Pro Wrestling America (PWA) in Minnesota and the Global Wrestling Federation (GWF) in Texas, winning the PWA Light Heavyweight title, the PWA Iron Horse TV Title and the GWF Light Heavyweight Championship. During this time, Waltman worked extensively with Jerry Lynn in North America and Japan. They often wrestled each other, but also teamed up to win the PWA Tag Team titles twice in 1993. While working for Larry Sharpe and Dennis Coralluzzo's WWA Promotion on November 28, 1992, in Clementon, New Jersey, his opponent "The Kamikaze Kid" Bill Wilcox overshot a suicide dive and landed on Waltman's head, driving it to the concrete and causing a blood clot near his brain. He was hospitalized for three days, could not work for four months, and was advised to give up wrestling completely.

=== New Japan Pro Wrestling (1993) ===
He appeared in New Japan Pro-Wrestling (NJPW)'s Top of the Super Juniors in 1993, facing the likes of Chris Benoit, Eddie Guerrero and Jushin Liger.

=== World Wrestling Federation (1993–1996) ===
==== Early appearances (1993–1995) ====
As The Lightning Kid, Waltman had his WWF tryout match in Phoenix, Arizona, in April 1993, the day after WrestleMania IX, losing to Louie Spicolli. After earning a contract, he made his television debut as "The Kamikaze Kid" on Monday Night Raw on May 3 (taped April 26), losing to Doink the Clown. He quickly became "The Cannonball Kid", losing to Mr. Hughes. He then became simply "The Kid", scoring an upset pinfall on Razor Ramon on the May 17 episode of Monday Night Raw, thus becoming "The 1–2–3 Kid". Razor challenged him to a rematch, wagering $2,500, then $5,000 and finally $10,000 of his own money. Kid accepted the challenge, but grabbed the money and ran from the arena during the match. Ted DiBiase taunted Ramon over losing to a nobody and losing his $10,000. This angered Kid, and led to a match in which he upset DiBiase as well. Razor, who turned face shortly before, took Kid under his wing.

The 1–2–3 Kid made his pay-per-view debut at SummerSlam on August 30, losing to DiBiase's tag partner Irwin R. Schyster. At Survivor Series on November 23, Kid was on Razor's team in a four-on-four elimination match, in which he and Marty Jannetty were the sole survivors. This led to them forming a tag team and holding the WWF Tag Team Championship for a week in January 1994 after beating The Quebecers. The 1–2–3 Kid competed in the King of the Ring tournament, losing to Owen Hart in the semi-finals on June 19. On July 11, he wrestled Bret Hart in an unusually long (for the time) and competitive match for the WWF Championship on Raw, which was ranked by WWE as the third-best match ever aired on Raw. He had another brief (one-day) tag title reign on January 22, 1995, with Bob Holly, defeating Bam Bam Bigelow and Tatanka at the Royal Rumble before losing to The Smoking Gunns (Billy and Bart) the next day on Raw. At SummerSlam on August 27, he lost to Hakushi.

==== Million Dollar Corporation (1995–1996) ====
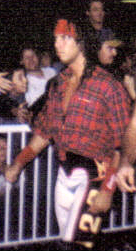
Waltman at an event in 1995

After Kid and Razor failed to win the Tag Team Championship from the Smoking Gunns on October 22 at In Your House 4, Kid attacked the face Gunns after the match to tease a heel turn. On the Raw before Survivor Series in November, he was the guest referee in a match between Ramon and Sycho Sid. As Razor attempted his finisher, The Razor's Edge, Kid pulled Sid down from Razor, allowing Sid to hit Razor with his Powerbomb, and Kid fast-counted the pinfall, turning heel. He was the sole survivor of his team at Survivor Series on November 19, besting rival Marty Jannetty with assistance from Sid. Kid and Jannetty traded victories over one another, culminating in a tag team match where Kid and Sid lost to Razor and Marty on December 17 at In Your House 5.

After Survivor Series, Kid joined Ted DiBiase's Million Dollar Corporation faction. He lost a "Crybaby match" to Ramon on February 18 at In Your House 6. The 1–2–3 Kid's final WWF match, which saw him lose to Savio Vega, aired on the May 20 episode of Monday Night Raw. Notably, Waltman was the only Kliq member not involved in the infamous "Curtain Call" that took place at Madison Square Garden the night before his final match from his first WWF run aired, as he was in drug rehab at the time.

=== World Championship Wrestling (1996–1997) ===
On September 16, 1996, Waltman was shown sitting in the front row for a live episode of Nitro. Later that night, he used a remote control to release New World Order (nWo) propaganda from the ceiling, revealing himself as the newest member of the recently formed faction. He was called "Syxx", because he was the sixth member of the nWo, and six is the sum of numbers in "1–2–3 Kid". His first match with WCW was on September 23 when he defeated Jim Duggan on Nitro. At Halloween Havoc on October 27, he lost to Chris Jericho. In his first major angle, Syxx stole Eddie Guerrero's WCW United States Heavyweight Championship belt, leading to a ladder match for the title on January 25, 1997, at Souled Out, which Syxx lost. At SuperBrawl VII on February 23, Syxx pinned Dean Malenko for the WCW Cruiserweight Championship, after hitting him with the title belt, which he had grabbed from Guerrero at ringside. In June, he lost the championship to Chris Jericho at a webcast house show in Los Angeles, California, minutes after successfully defending against Rey Mysterio Jr.

Syxx then started a feud with Ric Flair and lost to him at Road Wild on August 9. He disparagingly portrayed Flair as part of an nWo segment parodying his Four Horsemen group. This segment led to a WarGames match at Fall Brawl on September 14, where Syxx, Kevin Nash, Buff Bagwell and Konnan defeated The Four Horsemen (Flair, Steve McMichael, Chris Benoit and Curt Hennig) after Hennig betrayed the Horsemen and joined the nWo. In mid-1997, the nWo invoked "Wolfpac Rules", allowing Syxx to replace the injured Kevin Nash in defending the WCW World Tag Team Championship with Scott Hall, but they lost the titles on October 13 to The Steiner Brothers (Rick and Scott).

During October 1997, a neck injury sidelined Waltman from wrestling, but he continued to appear on television for several weeks after. While later recuperating at home, he was fired via Federal Express by WCW President Eric Bischoff. Waltman claims this was a power play aimed at his friends Hall and Nash, whose backstage influence was felt as a threat. Bischoff later said Waltman was a competent performer when sober, but sober periods were "few and far between", and "in many ways, Sean was lucky to even have a job".

=== Return to the WWF / World Wrestling Entertainment (1998–2002) ===
==== D-Generation X (1998–2000) ====
Waltman returned to WWF television on the March 30, 1998 episode of Monday Night Raw, the night after WrestleMania XIV and days after his firing from WCW. With Shawn Michaels beginning a four-year retirement after a WWF Championship loss and back injury, Triple H was now the leader of D-Generation X (DX). He said he was forming a DX army and "when you start an army, you look to your blood... you look to your buddies... you look to your friends... you look to The Kliq." Waltman appeared on the stage with a beard, commented on Bischoff and Hollywood Hogan, and said if they weren't contracted to WCW, Hall and Nash would have also returned to the WWF. Bischoff responded on Nitro the next week by telling Waltman to "bite me".

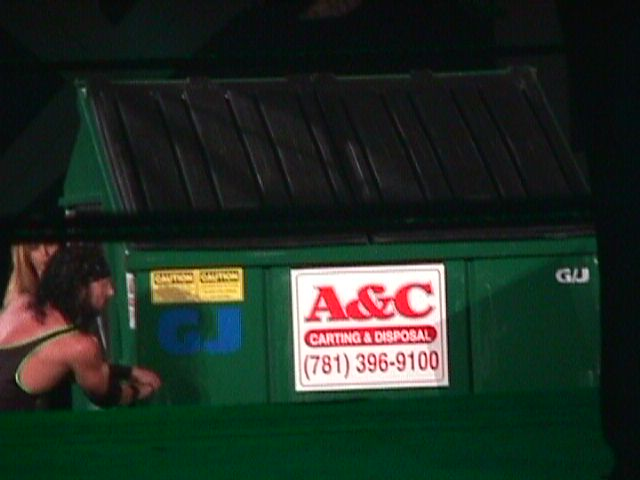
Waltman in a Dumpster match at King of the Ring 2000

He subsequently became known as "X-Pac" and lost to D'Lo Brown on July 26 at Fully Loaded: In Your House. He feuded with Jeff Jarrett and defeated him in a hair-vs-hair match on August 30 at SummerSlam. On September 21, X-Pac defeated Brown on Raw to win the WWF European Championship. He lost the title to Brown two weeks later, then won it again at Judgment Day: In Your House on October 18. At Survivor Series on November 15, he competed in a tournament for the vacant WWF Championship, but fought Steven Regal to a double countout. He failed to win the title from The Rock on December 6 at Capital Carnage. X-Pac lost the European Championship to Shane McMahon on the February 15, 1999 episode of Raw. At WrestleMania XV on March 28, he failed to regain the title when Triple H betrayed him and hit him with his Pedigree finisher.

X-Pac then sided with Road Dogg against Triple H, Chyna and Billy Gunn, after the temporary demise of DX. X-Pac and Road Dogg wanted a reformed DX to be about rebellion, while the others wanted it to be about making money. X-Pac befriended Kane, a mute, angry loner whom he partially socialized and encouraged to speak, through an electrolarynx. They won the WWF Tag Team Championship from Jarrett and Owen Hart on the April 5 episode of Raw. At Backlash on April 25, X-Pac lost to Triple H. He and Kane successfully defended the titles against Brown and Mark Henry at Over the Edge on May 23, before losing them to the Acolytes (Bradshaw and Faarooq) on the May 31 episode of Raw. X-Pac competed in the King of the Ring tournament, losing to Gunn in the finals on June 27. They regained the titles on the August 9 episode of Raw but lost them to Big Show and The Undertaker on August 22 at SummerSlam.

After DX reunited as a heel group, X-Pac led Kane to believe he would be inducted into DX, but instead betrayed him and eventually stole his new girlfriend, Tori. X-Pac lost to Kane at Survivor Series on November 19 and in a steel cage match at Armageddon on December 12, but defeated him in a No Holds Barred match at No Way Out on February 27, 2000. At WrestleMania 2000 on April 2, X-Pac and Road Dogg lost to Kane and Rikishi, ending their feud.

At King of the Ring on June 25, X-Pac, Road Dogg, and Tori defeated the Dudley Boyz in a dumpster match; during the bout, Tori was powerbombed through a table by the Dudley Boyz, marking the end of her affiliation with X-Pac. Growing dissension between X-Pac and Road Dogg led to a match at SummerSlam on August 27, which X-Pac won after a low blow; after the match, Road Dogg attacked X-Pac, marking the end of their tag team and the dissolution of DX. X-Pac then began feuding with Chris Jericho, but lost to him at Unforgiven on September 24 and in a cage match at No Mercy on October 22. During the feud, X-Pac sustained a neck injury when Jericho gave him a powerbomb, side-lining him for three months.

==== X-Factor; nWo reunion (2001–2002) ====
After returning from his neck injury in February 2001, X-Pac failed to win Jericho's WWF Intercontinental Championship in a fatal four-way match with Chris Benoit and Eddie Guerrero on February 25 at No Way Out. X-Pac formed a new stable called X-Factor with Justin Credible and Albert, defeating the Dudley Boyz on April 29 at Backlash. At King of the Ring on June 24, X-Pac failed to win the WWF Light Heavyweight Championship from Jeff Hardy, but won the title in a rematch the next night on Raw. He won his second WCW Cruiserweight Championship by defeating Billy Kidman on July 30. Despite the reign occurring during the WCW Invasion angle, where the WWF side was mostly portrayed as faces, the fans were vocal in their disapproval of Waltman during his reign; this was known as "X-Pac heat". When Credible joined the ECW/WCW Alliance, X-Factor broke up. At SummerSlam on August 19, X-Pac defeated Tajiri to win his second Light Heavyweight Championship, but lost the Cruiserweight Championship to Kidman on the October 11 episode of SmackDown!. After this, he took time off to recover from another injury, and the WWF Light Heavyweight Championship was abandoned upon his return to television in March 2002.

Hall, Nash and Hogan returned to the WWF in 2002 as the New World Order (nWo), brought in by Vince McMahon. Hogan was kicked from the group after losing to The Rock at WrestleMania X8. X-Pac returned on the March 21 episode of SmackDown!, rejoined the nWo and attacked Hogan. He said he had been waiting four years to do so, because Hogan shot on WCW Thunder after Waltman's firing, saying he could not "cut the mustard". The storyline was dropped after the first WWF draft, when the nWo went to Raw and Hogan to SmackDown!. On the July 8 episode of Raw, X-Pac wrestled in a ten-man tag team match, which marked his last WWE match. This match was also the end of the nWo angle, as Nash tore his quadriceps, and Vince McMahon disbanded the group a week later. In August, Raw commentator Jim Ross announced WWE and Waltman had parted ways.

=== NWA Total Nonstop Action (2002, 2003) ===
Waltman, as "Syxx-Pac", debuted for NWA Total Nonstop Action on September 18, 2002, losing a gauntlet match. Rejoining his WWF tag partners Scott Hall and B.G. James, he feuded with Jeff Jarrett and Brian Lawler. On October 9, Syxx-Pac made his X Division debut, defeating eight other wrestlers in a ladder match to win the vacant TNA X Division Championship. He held the title for two weeks before losing to A.J. Styles in a No Disqualification match. He abruptly left TNA after defeating Lawler in the first round of an NWA World Heavyweight Championship number one contender tournament on November 6.

Waltman returned to TNA for a single night on June 18, 2003, at their first anniversary pay-per-view, as Styles's mystery partner in a loss to Jarrett and Sting.

=== Independent circuit (2002–2005) ===
In between during his time in TNA, X-Pac worked in the independent circuit, including for 3PW, where, as Syxx-Pac, he defeated Sabu on September 21, 2002. On November 23, he lost to Sabu in a match for the 3PW World Heavyweight Championship. Waltman, as "X", debuted in Xtreme Pro Wrestling (XPW) on February 28, 2003, winning the XPW Television Championship from Kaos, a title which he held until the promotion closed in March.

On April 16, 2004, X-Pac lost to American Dragon in the first round of the NJPW Inoki Dojo Best Of American Super Juniors tournament.

On October 7, 2005, Waltman made his debut for Full Impact Pro (FIP), defeating Jimmy Rave at X-Factor. He engaged in a feud with DP Associates, facing members Rave, Austin Aries, Adam Pearce, Bryan Danielson and Shane Hagadorn.

=== Return to NWA Total Nonstop Action (2005, 2006) ===
Under his real name, Waltman returned to TNA at Against All Odds on February 13, 2005, attacking Jeff Jarrett during his NWA World Heavyweight Championship match with Kevin Nash. Nash, Waltman and Diamond Dallas Page formed an alliance and feuded with Planet Jarrett (Jarrett, The Outlaw and Monty Brown). At Lockdown on April 24, Waltman, B.G. James and Page defeated Planet Jarrett in a Lethal Lockdown match.

At Hard Justice on May 15, Waltman replaced Jeff Hardy, who no-showed, losing to Raven in a Clockwork Orange House of Fun match. On June 19, at Slammiversary, Waltman lost a five-man King of the Mountain match for the NWA World Heavyweight Championship. He cost defending champion A.J. Styles the title by delivering an X-Factor off a ladder, turning heel. At No Surrender on July 17, Waltman lost to Styles after guest referee Jerry Lynn prevented him from cheating. Waltman challenged Lynn to a match at Sacrifice on August 14, which he lost, then attacked Lynn in an attempt to reinjure his shoulder. Waltman then partnered with Alex Shelley to win the Chris Candido Cup, earning them a shot at the NWA World Tag Team Championship at Unbreakable on September 11. However, Waltman no-showed the event.

He was not seen again until a one-night return at Final Resolution on January 15, 2006, being brought in by Larry Zbyszko to defeat his rival, Raven.

=== Wrestling Society X (2006) ===
In February 2006, Waltman joined MTV's newly formed Wrestling Society X (WSX) promotion, as "6-Pac". At their inaugural tapings on February 9, 6-Pac had a ten-man hardcore battle royal ladder match, which both he and Vampiro won by climbing the ladder to retrieve WSX contracts. 6-Pac lost a WSX Championship match to Vampiro the following week. He challenged Vampiro in episode four, as a ruse to introduce Ricky Banderas, who attacked Vampiro from behind. He teased an affair with Lizzy Valentine (the valet and girlfriend of Matt Sydal), though WSX folded before the angle could go on any further.

=== Return to independent circuit (2006–2010) ===
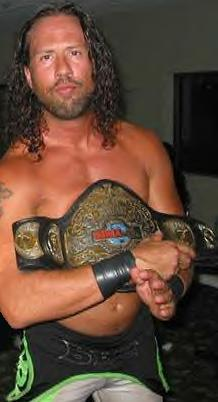
Waltman as the NWA Heritage Champion in 2007.

Waltman returned to Full Impact Pro on January 20, 2006, defeating Tony Mamaluke. He defeated Adam Pearce for the NWA Heritage Championship on April 21, 2007, but lost it in a rematch a week later. On July 8, 2007, Waltman teamed with Billy Kidman in a three-way tag match in McAllen, Texas, for the NWA World Tag Team Championship, which had been vacated by Team 3D after the NWA stopped working with TNA. They lost the match to Karl Anderson and Joey Ryan.

In June, Waltman, as X-Pac, began working regularly for AAA, initially a member of Konnan's La Legión Extranjera (Foreign Legion) and managed by girlfriend Alicia Webb. After leaving for rehab in mid-2008, he returned at Verano de Escándalo (Summer of Scandal) that September, turning on the Foreign Legion and forming D-Generation Mex, a parody of D-Generation X, with Rocky Romero and Alex Koslov. He later feuded with one of AAA's top stars, El Zorro.

On August 8, 2009, at GLCW Slamfest, X-Pac became the new GLCW Heavyweight Champion by defeating Skull Crusher, who had replaced champion Al Snow when he failed to show.

=== Second return to TNA (2010) ===
On a special live, three-hour Monday night episode of Impact! on January 4, 2010, Waltman (as Syxx-Pac) and Scott Hall returned to TNA. That night, fellow former nWo member Hulk Hogan debuted in TNA. Kevin Nash, Hall and Waltman quickly reformed an alliance called The Band, but Hogan stayed away, saying times had changed. On the January 14 episode of Impact!, The Band attacked Beer Money, Inc. (Robert Roode and James Storm), losing to them at Genesis on January 17 (with Syxx-Pac replacing Hall and teaming with Nash). On the next Impact! Hogan, disgusted by The Band's actions, had security eject Syxx-Pac and Hall, saying they weren't contracted to TNA. Despite this, they appeared the next week, attacking Kurt Angle. A week later, they betrayed Nash and beat him down. At Destination X on March 21, Syxx-Pac and Hall wagered their TNA jobs in a match against Nash and Eric Young. Nash turned on Young and helped The Band win the match and full TNA contracts. On the March 29 episode of Impact!, The Band lost a six-man steel cage tag match to Young, Jeff Hardy and Rob Van Dam.

Syxx-Pac was scheduled for a tag team match at Lockdown on April 18, but was replaced by Nash after the Missouri Athletic Commission barred Waltman from wrestling, due to his hepatitis C. On the April 26 episode of Impact!, Waltman was written off of television when Team 3D found Syxx-Pac on a backstage floor in a pool of blood; Eric Young took his place in The Band. In June, TNA released Waltman and Hall.

=== Late career (2010–2019) ===
On March 5, 2011, Waltman reunited with former D-Generation X members Road Dogg and Billy Gunn for a six-man tag match at a Pro Wrestling Syndicate show in Long Island, New York. A week later, X-Pac defeated UIW Lightweight Champion Stupid in a non-title match. On April 2, Waltman returned to WWE television to celebrate, with Kevin Nash and Triple H, their longtime friend Shawn Michaels' induction into the 2011 WWE Hall of Fame. He later worked backstage as a scout and evaluator in WWE's developmental territory Florida Championship Wrestling (FCW).

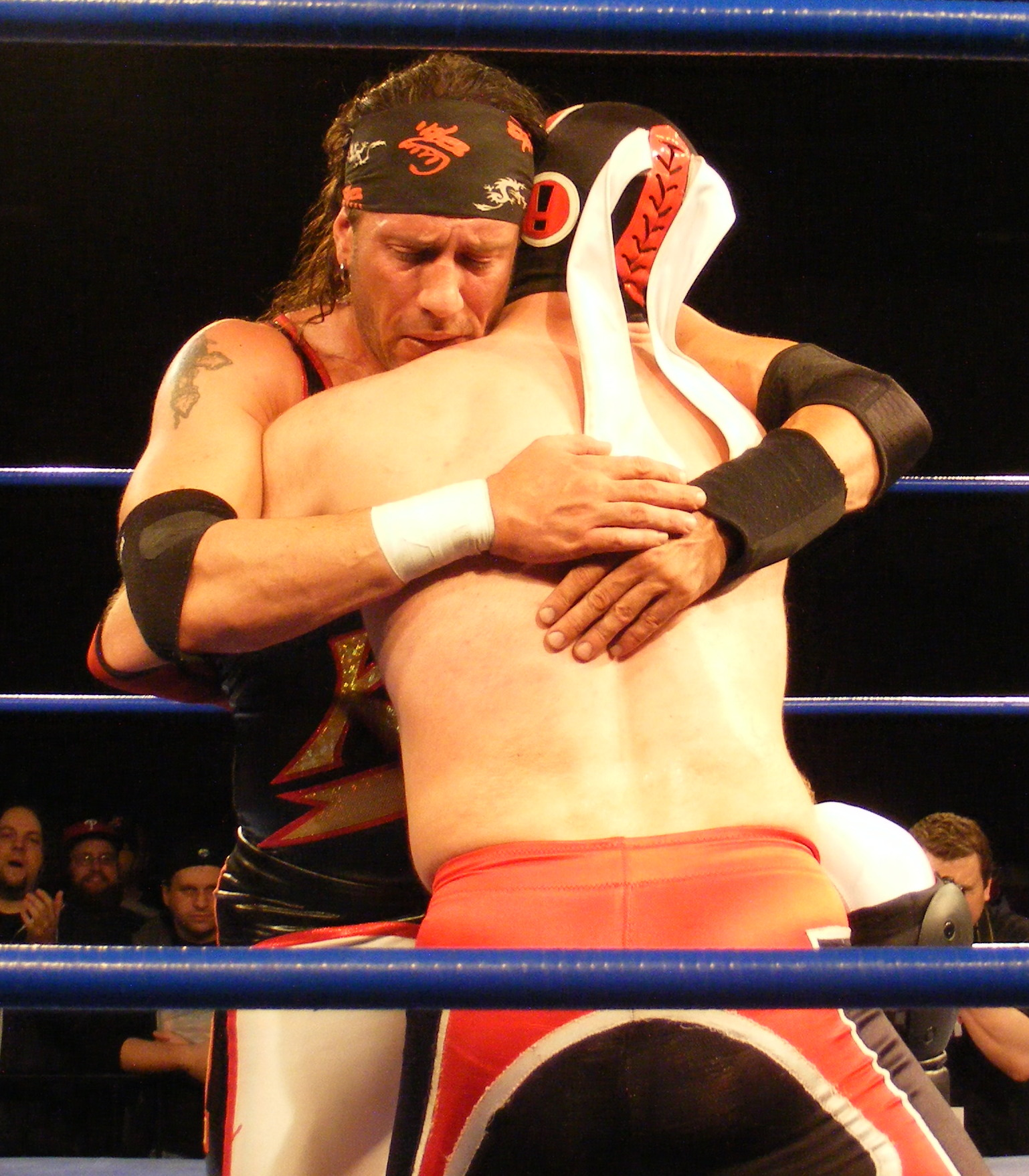
1–2–3 Kid (left) embracing El Generico after their match at King of Trios on April 17, 2011

On April 15, 2011, Waltman, as The 1–2–3 Kid, debuted for Chikara by entering their King of Trios tournament, teaming with Arik Cannon and Darin Corbin (Team Minnesota). They were eliminated in the first round by Team Michinoku Pro (Dick Togo, Great Sasuke and Jinsei Shinzaki). The day after, Waltman defeated Amazing Red, Frightmare and Obariyon in a four-way elimination match to make it to the next day's Rey de Voladores tournament final, losing to El Generico. After the match, Waltman said he believed 2011 would be his last year in professional wrestling, praising Chikara as the "future of wrestling" and thanking them for a memorable weekend.

On July 23, 2012, he, Billy Gunn and Road Dogg returned to join Shawn Michaels and Triple H for a D-Generation X reunion on the 1000th episode of Raw.

In September 2012, the 1–2–3 Kid returned to Chikara for the 2012 King of Trios tournament, this time teaming with Aldo Montoya and Tatanka as Team WWF. On September 14, they lost their first-round match to The Extreme Trio (Jerry Lynn, Tommy Dreamer and Too Cold Scorpio). The next day, The 1–2–3 Kid was low-blowed and pinned by Mark Angelosetti. On the final day of the tournament weekend, The 1–2–3 Kid and Marty Jannetty won the annual tag team gauntlet match. On November 18, he and Jannetty defeated The Heart Throbs (Antonio Thomas and Romeo Roselli) to earn their third point (for three consecutive wins) and a shot at the Chikara Campeonatos de Parejas. They lost the title match to defending champions The Young Bucks (Matt and Nick Jackson) on December 2 at the Under the Hood internet pay-per-view.

In January 2013, The Kliq/DX reunited for an episode of NXT. In March, Waltman signed a WWE Legends contract (a long-term contract which gives WWE merchandising rights to a wrestler's name and likeness, requires occasional appearances and prevents them from working for competing major promotions, but allows for independent appearances).

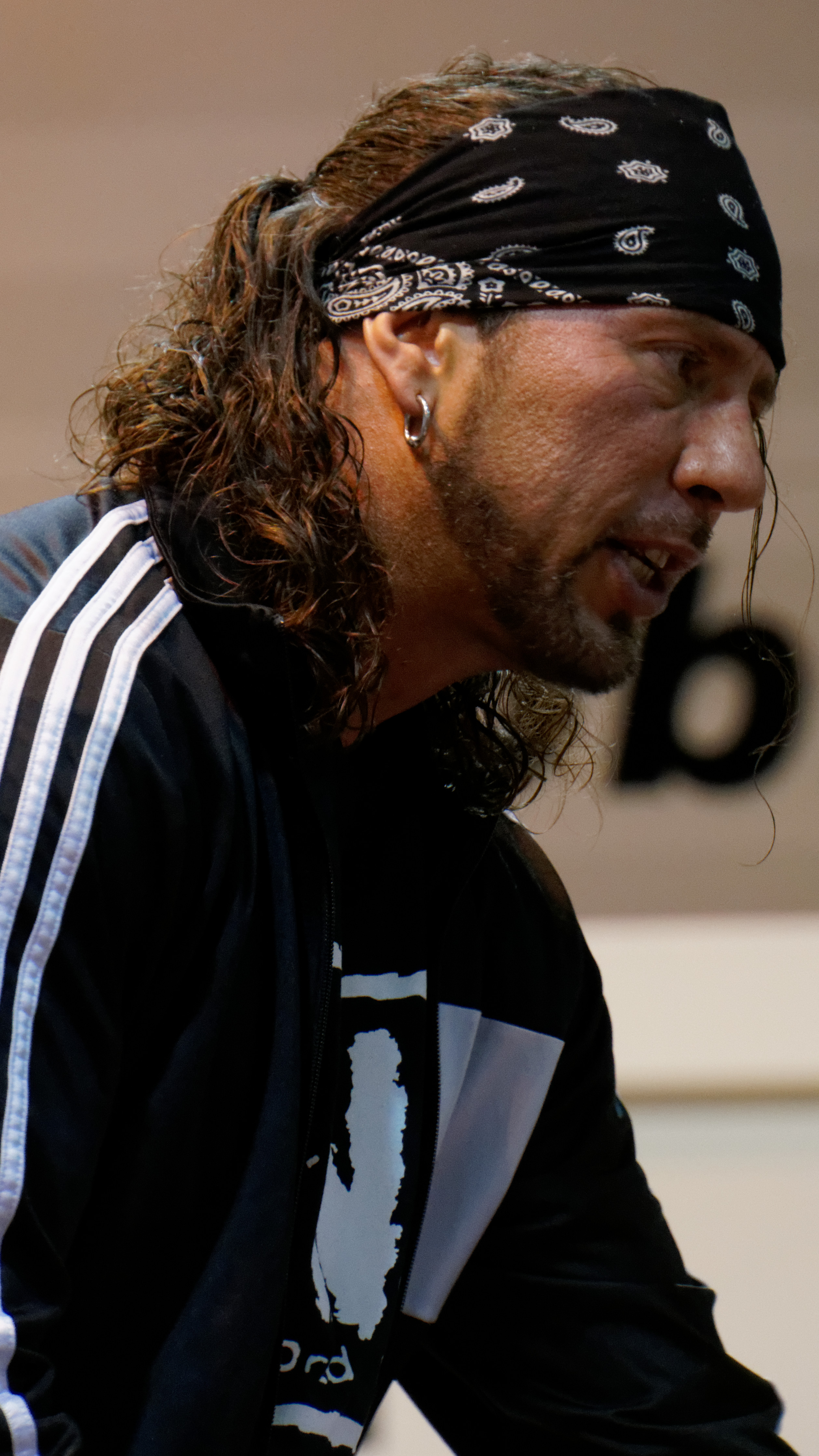
Waltman in April 2014

Waltman, under his real name, returned to Chikara on March 8, 2013, losing to Hallowicked. On March 23, in a four-way match at Jerry Lynn's retirement show in Minneapolis, X-Pac tore his anus by performing his signature Bronco Buster onto the exposed turnbuckle. Afterward, he went back to his hotel room, where he discovered a lot of blood coming out of his clothes and went to the hospital. He underwent a sphincteroplasty and was released the following morning. On November 9, X-Pac and Lance Storm lost to Tommy Dreamer and Terry Funk in the main event of House of Hardcore 3. On June 14, 2014, X-Pac and Rikishi defeated Gangrel and Matt Striker at House of Hardcore 6. In September, Waltman returned to Chikara to do commentary during the first round of the 2014 King of Trios.

On the January 19, 2015 episode of Raw, Damien Mizdow appeared with Kevin Nash, Shawn Michaels, Scott Hall and Triple H dressed as X-Pac, only for X-Pac to confront him, until The Miz interrupted them to tell them that Mizdow was only his stunt double, and that the party was over. He appeared again with Hall and Nash, being interrupted by The Ascension, who were attempting to attack them, only to be joined by The APA and The New Age Outlaws in fending them off. At WrestleMania 31 on March 29, X-Pac along with the New Age Outlaws and Michaels helped Triple H win his match against Sting.

In July 2016, X-Pac reunited with Billy Gunn in Scotland for Pro Wrestling Elite (PWE)'s fifth anniversary weekend. On September 4, Waltman made a surprise return to Chikara, again representing DX alongside Gunn in a tag team gauntlet match. The two entered the match as the final team and scored the win over Prakash Sabar and The Proletariat Boar of Moldova. In January 2018, Waltman returned at WWE Raw 25 Years and reunited with DX and Scott Hall.

In 2019, Waltman, as X-Pac was inducted into the WWE Hall of Fame as a member of D-Generation X alongside Triple H, Shawn Michaels, Road Dogg, Billy Gunn and the late Chyna. During WrestleMania 35 weekend in April 2019, X-Pac, Hurricane Helms and Jushin Thunder Liger won a six-man tag team match against Revolt! (Caleb Konley, Jake Manning, and Zane Riley) at the WrestleCon Mark Hitchcock Memorial SuperShow. Later in July, he claimed that the match would be his last and that he was retired. On December 9, it was announced that Waltman, under his real name, would be inducted into the WWE Hall of Fame a second time as part of the class of 2020, this time as a member of the New World Order, together with fellow former nWo stablemates Hulk Hogan, Kevin Nash, and Scott Hall; this made him the first person to be inducted two years in a row, and the first to be inducted twice as part of teams or groups.

=== Game Changer Wrestling (2022) ===
Waltman came out of retirement on February 25, 2022, debuting in Game Changer Wrestling (GCW) at Welcome to Heartbreak as the tag team partner of Joey Janela, defeating the Major Players (Matt Cardona and Brian Myers). On March 31, at Joey Janela's Spring Break 6, Waltman lost to Janela.

== Other media ==
In 2004, Waltman co-starred with then-girlfriend Chyna in the now-infamous amateur adult film 1 Night in China. On September 1, 2016, Waltman began hosting the weekly podcast X-Pac 1, 2, 360.

Waltman has been a playable character in video games including WWF Raw, WCW vs. nWo: World Tour, WCW Nitro, WWF Attitude, WWF Smackdown!, WWF WrestleMania 2000, WWF No Mercy, WWF SmackDown! 2: Know Your Role, WWF With Authority!, WWF Road to WrestleMania, WWE SmackDown! Shut Your Mouth, WWF Raw, WWE '13, downloadable content in WWE 2K14 as Syxx-Pac, WWE 2K16, WWE 2K20, WWE 2K22, WWE 2K23, WWE 2K24 and WWE 2K25.

== Personal life ==
In the mid-2000s, Waltman was in a relationship with Joanie Laurer, who competed as Chyna in the WWF. They were engaged on November 1, 2002, but eventually split up. In March 2005, Waltman appeared on the VH1 reality show The Surreal Life, in which he visited Laurer in an attempt to reconcile with her. After Laurer refused to reconcile, he was eventually ejected from the house by the other guests.

In 2008, Waltman attempted suicide in his Mexico City apartment. He later said he was so overcome with shame and guilt after a physical altercation with his then-girlfriend Alicia Webb that he consumed a mixture of pills and alcohol and hanged himself from his apartment balcony. Webb found him hanging and was able to get him down, reviving him until an ambulance arrived. Following this incident, he was placed in WWE-sponsored rehab and began his recovery.

On April 30, 2017, Waltman was arrested at the Los Angeles International Airport while allegedly possessing methamphetamine. On May 26, the charges were dropped after lab results determined the pills he had were not methamphetamine nor any form of narcotic.

On September 24, 2018, Waltman announced the death of his ex-wife and the mother of his two children, Terry Waltman, to whom he was married from 1994 to 2002, stating she had "lost her battle with mental illness and addiction". He began dating author Angela Nissel in 2018. In 2022, Waltman became a grandfather.

== Filmography ==
Year	Title	Role	Notes
1992	Crossing the Bridge	High School Senior #3	
2004	1 Night in China	Himself	
2016	The Chris Gethard Show	Himself	1 episode
2016	Table for 3	Himself	1 episode
2017	Movie Trivia Schmoedown	Himself	1 episode
2017	The Swerve	Himself	2 episodes
2019	Verotika	Counter Person	Segment: "Change of Face"

== Championships and accomplishments ==
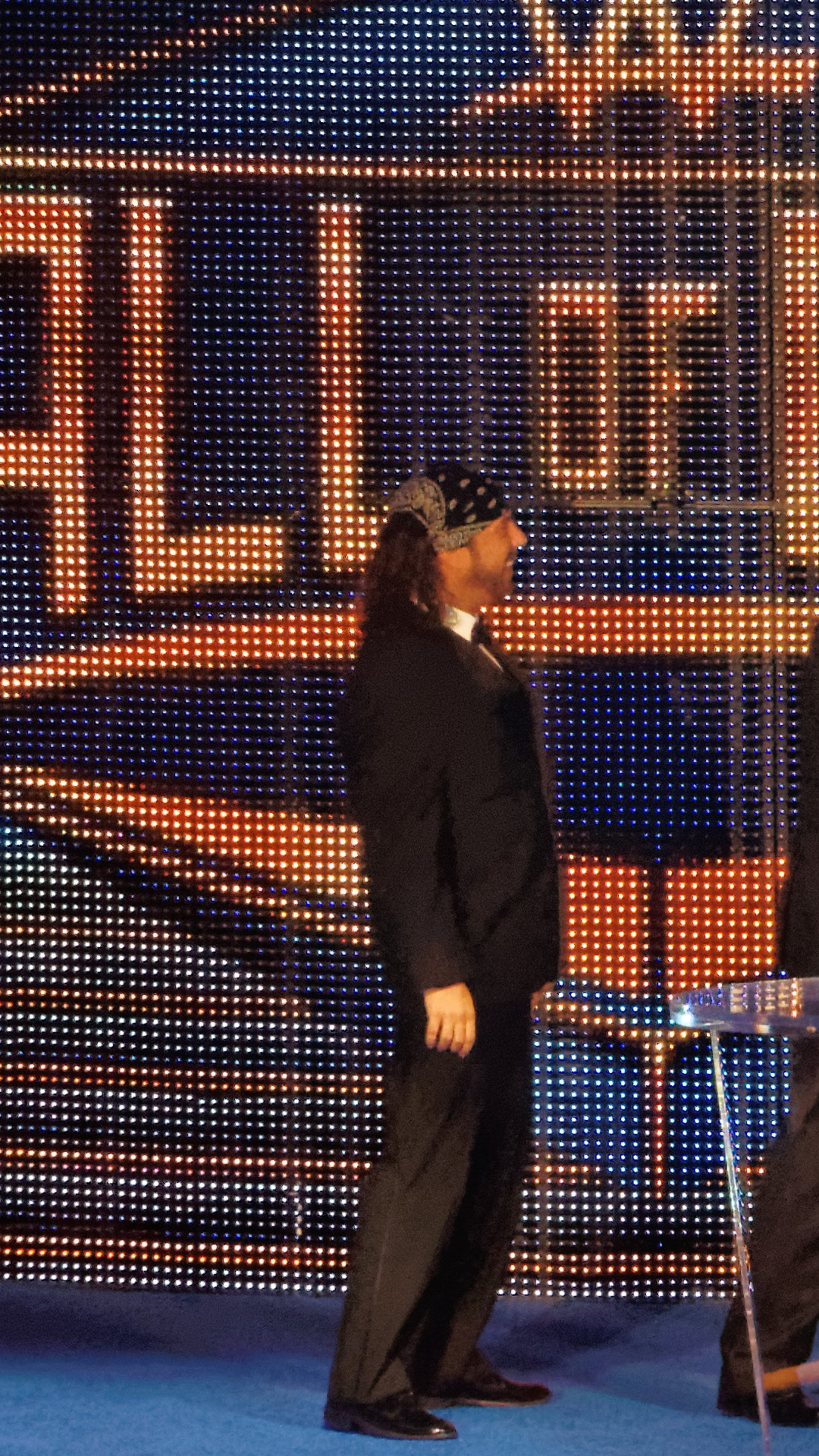
Waltman is a two-time inductee into the WWE Hall of Fame, having been inducted in 2019 as a member of D-Generation X and in 2021 as part of the nWo

- Bad Boys of Wrestling Federation
  - BBFW Caribbean Championship (1 time)
- DDT Pro-Wrestling
  - Ironman Heavymetalweight Championship (1 time)
- Great Lakes Championship Wrestling
  - GLCW Heavyweight Championship (1 time)
- Global Wrestling Federation
  - GWF Light Heavyweight Championship (2 times)
  - GWF Light Heavyweight Championship Tournament (1991)
- Jersey Championship Wrestling
  - JCW Tag Team Championship (1 time) – with Joey Janela
- Legends Pro Wrestling
  - LPW Hall of Fame (2011)
- Metroplex Wrestling
  - MPX Tag Team Championship (1 time) – with Jerome Daniels
- Mid-Eastern Wrestling Federation
  - MEWF Light Heavyweight Championship (1 time)
- NWA Pro Wrestling
  - NWA Heritage Championship (1 time)
- Pro Wrestling America
  - PWA Iron Horse Television Championship (1 time)
  - PWA Light Heavyweight Championship (2 times)
  - PWA Tag Team Championship (1 time) – with Jerry Lynn
- Pro Wrestling Illustrated
  - PWI Comeback of the Year (1998)
  - PWI Tag Team of the Year (1999) – with Kane
  - Ranked no. 21 of the top 500 singles wrestlers in the PWI 500 in 1997
  - Ranked no. 177 of the top 500 singles wrestlers of the "PWI Years" in 2003
- South Eastern Wrestling Alliance
  - SEWA Light Heavyweight Championship (1 time)
- Total Nonstop Action Wrestling
  - TNA X Division Championship (1 time)
  - Chris Candido Memorial Tag Team Tournament – with Alex Shelley
- World Championship Wrestling
  - WCW Cruiserweight Championship (1 time)
  - WCW World Tag Team Championship (1 time) – with Kevin Nash and Scott Hall^{1}
- World Wrestling Federation / WWE
  - WWF European Championship (2 times)
  - WWF Light Heavyweight Championship (2 times, final)
  - WCW Cruiserweight Championship (1 time)
  - WWF Tag Team Championship (4 times) – with Marty Jannetty (1), Bob Holly (1) and Kane (2)
  - Slammy Award (1 time)
    - Biggest Heart (1994)
  - WWF World Tag Team Championship Tournament (1995) – with Bob Holly
  - WWE Hall of Fame (2 times)
    - Class of 2019 – as a member of D-Generation X
    - Class of 2020 – as a member of the New World Order
- Xtreme Pro Wrestling
  - XPW Television Championship (1 time, final)
- Wrestling Society X
  - WSX Rumble (shared with Vampiro)
- Wrestling Observer Newsletter
  - Best Gimmick (1996) – nWo
  - Feud of the Year (1996) New World Order vs. World Championship Wrestling

^{1} – Following an injury to Nash, the nWo invoked "Wolfpac Rules" and named Syxx as co-champion

== Luchas de Apuestas record ==
Winner (wager)	Loser (wager)	Location	Event	Date	Notes
X-Pac (hair)	Jeff Jarrett (hair)	New York, New York	SummerSlam (1998)	August 30, 1998	
