= Ghostline =

2014 film by Dean Whitney

- Directed by: Dean Whitney
- Written by: Dean Whitney
- Produced by: Dean Whitney; Judy Whitney
- Starring: Rachel Alig; Zack Gold; Burt Culver; Mark Benjamin; Pia Thrasher; Rachel Elizabeth Ames; Justin Little; Tim Clifton; Andrea Bensussen
- Cinematography: Jesse Aragon
- Edited by: Gilly Rudolf
- Music by: Steve Garbade
- Production company: Undaunted Films
- Distributed by: Ammo Content; Inception Media Group
- Release dates: 2014 (festivals); October 6, 2015
- Running time: 85 minutes
- Country: United States
- Language: English

Ghostline is a 2014 supernatural horror film written and directed by Dean Whitney. The film stars Rachel Alig, Zack Gold, Burt Culver and Mark Benjamin.

== Plot ==
An unknown caller terrorizes a couple on their landline, forcing them to take action with deadly consequences.

== Cast ==
- Rachel Alig
- Zack Gold
- Burt Culver
- Mark Benjamin
- Pia Thrasher
- Rachel Elizabeth Ames
- Justin Little
- Tim Clifton
- Andrea Bensussen

== Production ==
The direction and script is by Dean Whitney and the film is produced by Undaunted Films. The story was influenced by Paranormal Activity and shot in San Diego where casting auditions began in 2012. Whitney said casting actors local to San Diego was an issue for specific age ranges and turned to Los Angeles based actors. The film was shot on a Red camera.

== Release ==
The film was released on DVD and Blu-ray on October 6, 2015.

== Reception ==
=== Critical response ===
Dean Sills at UK Horror Scene said it's a “superb supernatural horror that will leave you hanging in suspense” scoring it 8 out of 10. Terry Lewis at The Other View gave it a 4 out of 5 claiming the beginning was not necessary but the film was worth watching. Mike Guerreiro at Wicked Channel did not recommend the film stating that plot holes left them with too many questions. Jesse Crump at Horror News Net claims that the story isn’t bad but said that nothing stood out to make the film memorable.

=== Accolades ===
List of awards and nominations
Festival	Year	Award	Recipient(s)	Result
California Film Awards	2014	Silver Award - Feature Film Competition	Dean Whitney	Nominated
FANtastic Horror Film Festival	2014	Best Actress in a Feature Film	Rachel Alig	Nominated
FANtastic Horror Film Festival	2014	Best of the Fest	Dean Whitney	Won
Florida Horror Film Festival	2014	Best Visual FX Feature	Ghostline	Won
Terror Film Festival	2014	Claw Award - Best Feature Film Screenplay	Dean Whitney	Nominated
