= Prostitution in Paris =

Prostitution in Paris, both in street form and in dedicated facilities, has had a long history and remains present to this day.

== History ==
=== Middle Ages ===
Louis XI organised the profession by limiting the streets where prostitutes could operate. The king considered them "crazy or drunk with their bodies".

In 1446 new rules reinforced the measures being taken by prohibiting the wearing of certain outfits considered to be highly provocative; feather, fur and the infamous gold belts.

=== Early modern era ===
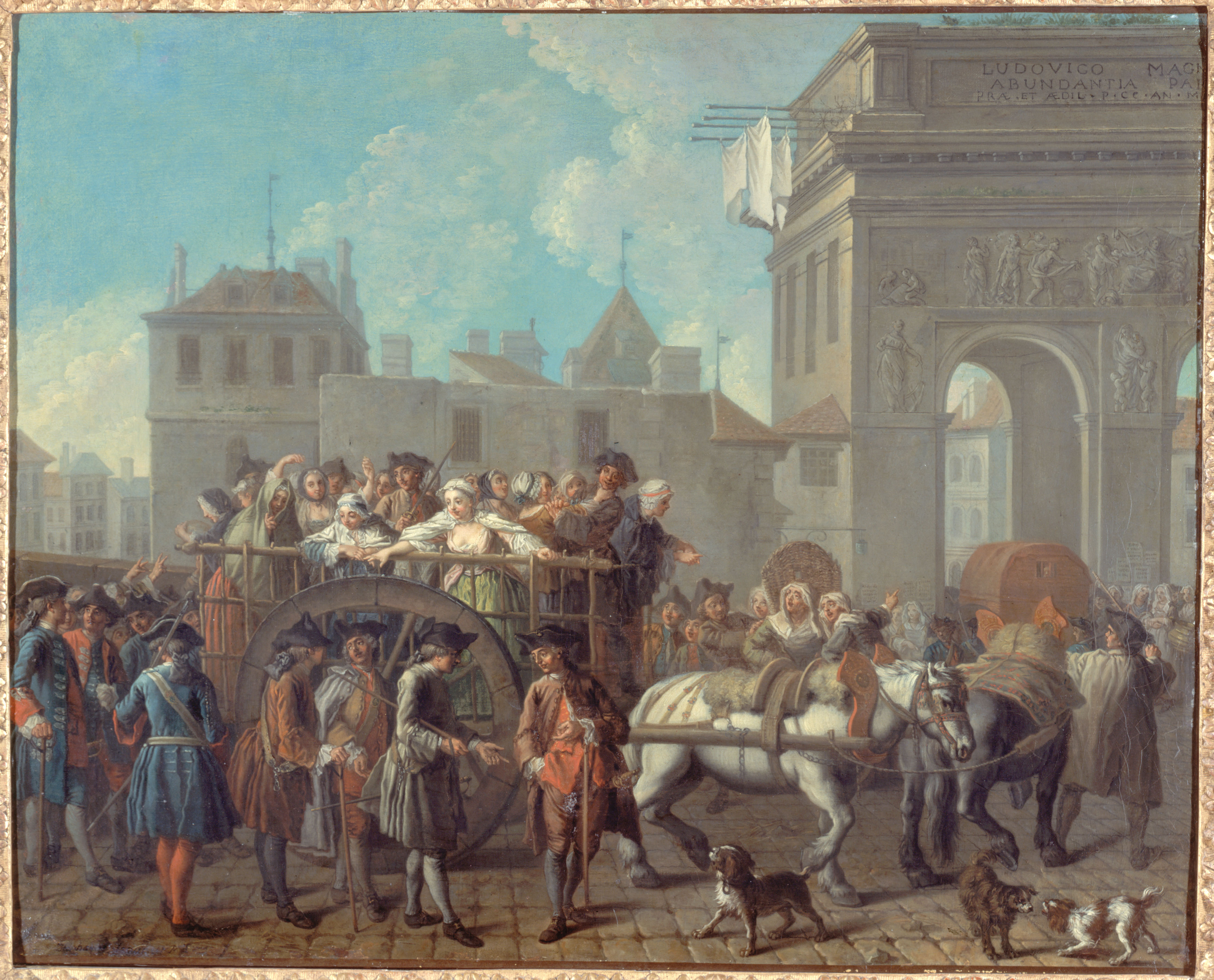
Étienne Jeaurat (1699–1789). "Filles de joie" being taken to the Salpêtrière 1745. Oil on canvas, Musée Carnavalet, Paris

Women who were guilty of "public debauchery, prostitution or scandalous behaviour" were locked in the Pitié-Salpêtrière Hospital, which had been created by Louis XIV in 1656.

Before the French Revolution in 1789, there were estimated to be 30,000 prostitutes in Paris, plus a further 10,000 high-class prostitutes. In 1791, the French revolutionaries decriminalized prostitution. (Note: The Penal Code 1810 does not classify prostitution as a crime.) However, the population was worried about the increase of prostitutes and the threat of syphilis. On 4 October 1793, the Commune of Paris issued a regulatory order forbidding prostitutes to stand in public spaces to "incite to debauchery". Although it led to the arrest and sanitary control of more than 400 prostitutes in 1794, this decree did not prevent the continued development of prostitution, particularly at the Palais-Royal, which became the first sex market in the capital. There were many "girls" that crisscrossed the garden paths and galleries of the Palace, and erotic shows and shops dedicated to prostitution.

=== Modern era ===
==== 19th century ====
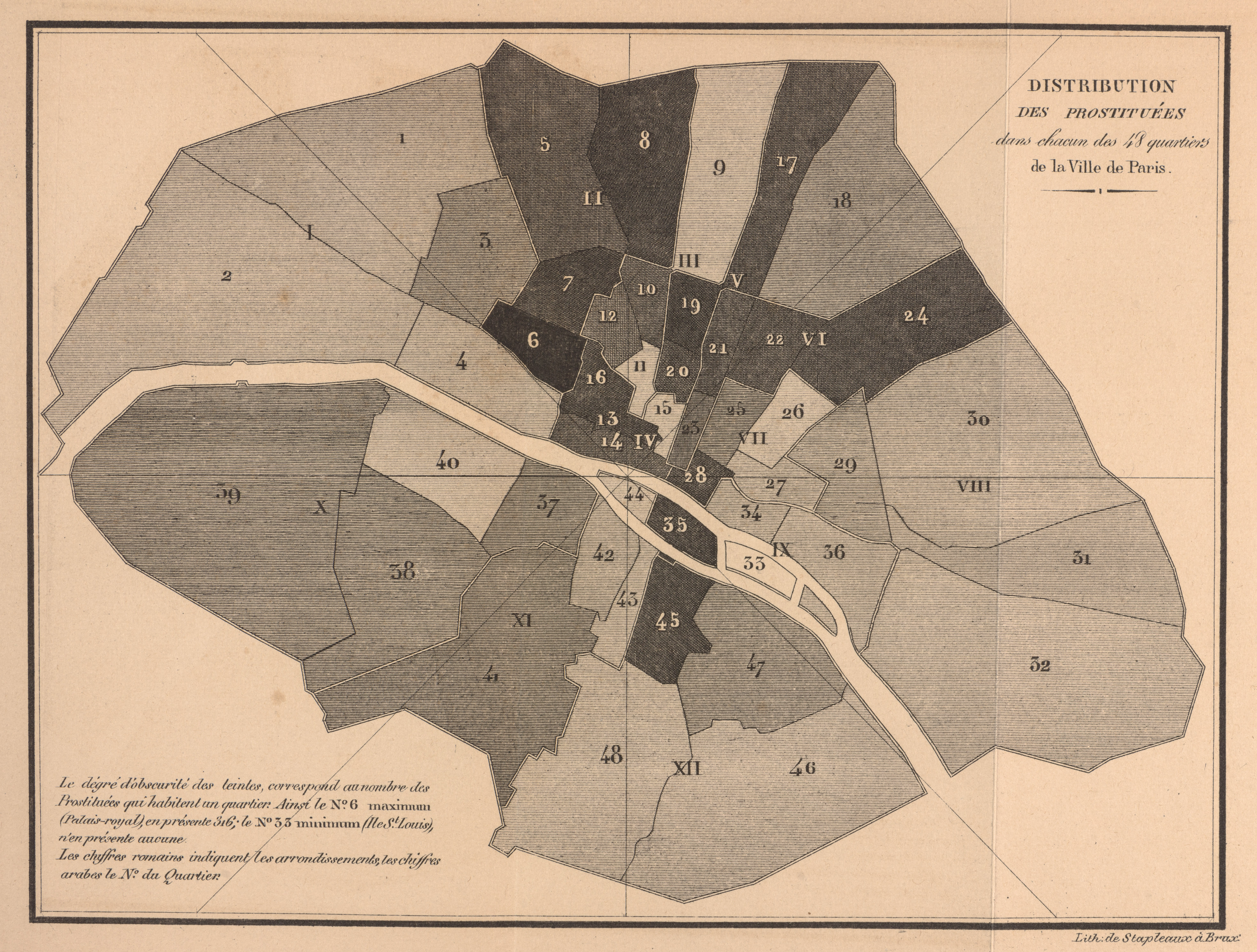
Alexandre Jean-Baptiste, Distribution of Prostitutes in Paris, 1836 - University Library

Under the July Monarchy, a medical hygienist and sewer specialist, (Note: Châtelet Alexandre Parent is the author of an essay on sewers or drains of the city of Paris published in 1824) Alexandre Parent du Châtelet published in 1836 the book Of the prostitution in the city of Paris, considered in terms of public hygiene, morality and administration: a book supported by statistical documents drawn from the archives of the Prefecture of Police, which will remain the reference study on prostitution for several decades. Parent du Châtelet considers that a certain tolerance of prostitution should be allowed to maintain the current order, but mentions its dangers and therefore the necessity for control. To do that he advocates maison-closes, a hospital to treat women with venereal diseases, a prison to punish those who break the law and houses of repentance. Female prostitutes must report to the police headquarters and undergo medical examinations. Infected women are to be treated in the infirmary of the Prison Saint-Lazare, which was opened 1836. They can not leave the establishment without being cured. The overall purpose of this policy is to control and hide, as far as possible, prostitution, which was viewed as a necessary evil. Alexandre Parent du Châtelet submits: "It is important to hide death as much as sex, flesh decomposing as much as the flesh object of desire."

==== 20th century ====
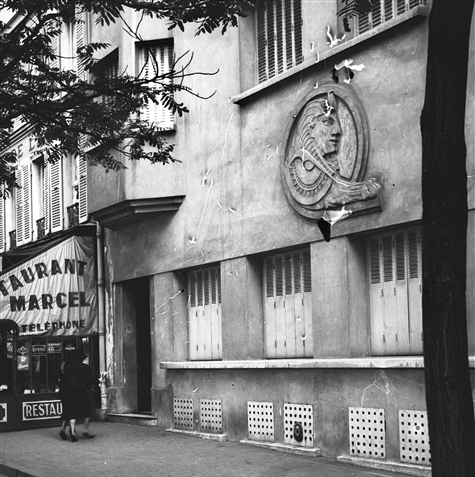
Le Sphinx in 1938

Of men born between 1920 and 1925, one in five had experienced his first sexual relationship in a maison-close.

Paris accommodated many brothels until their prohibition in 1946 following the introduction of the Loi Marthe Richard. 195 establishments were then closed in Paris. (Note: Nationally 1,400 maison-closes are closed) Among the most famous are the One-Two-Two, Le Chabanais, Le Sphinx and La Fleur blanche.

An exhibition about historical Paris brothels took place from November 2009 to January 2010 in an art gallery across the street from the former Le Chabanais.

==== 21st century ====
Since 2016, the purchase of sex is illegal in France, and therefore in Paris. Before that, while prostitution was legal, certain activities related to prostitution were prohibited, such as brothel-keeping (since 1946), pimping and prostitution of minors.

In 2004, according to OCRTEH (Central Office for the Repression of Trafficking in Human Beings), there were between 7,000 and 7,500 prostitutes of all sexes in Paris. Marie-Elizabeth Handman and Janine Mossuz-Lavau argue that these figures do not take into account modes of prostitution whose participants have never had any involvement with the police, such as escorts who find clients on the internet or salaried women who are limited to a few liaisons a month. In 2010, Brain Magazine published a map of prostitution in Paris by area of origin: South American transsexuals in the Bois de Boulogne; African prostitutes in Barbès-Rochechouart as well as in vans known as "BMC" (Bordel militaire de campagne) in the Bois de Vincennes, French in Strasbourg – Saint-Denis; Chinese, Mongolian and Romanian at the Porte Saint-Martin; and finally, along the Boulevards of the Marshals, are Romanian, Maghreb and African prostitutes.

Since the law to penalise the customers of prostitution, passed in April 2016, the conviction of more than 400 customers in Paris was recorded from 2016 - 2017. (Note: On a national level, 937 clients were caught) Most of these lawbreakers were caught in the Boulevards of the Marshals, Bois de Boulogne, Bois de Vincennes or the 350 so-called massage parlours scattered around the capital. Jean-Paul Mégret, head of the Brigade de répression du proxénétisme (BRP) of the Direction Régionale de Police Judiciaire de Paris, considers that this law has the effect of "Driving girls off of the streets and into hotels and apartments, everything is happening via cyberprostitution".

== Types of prostitution ==
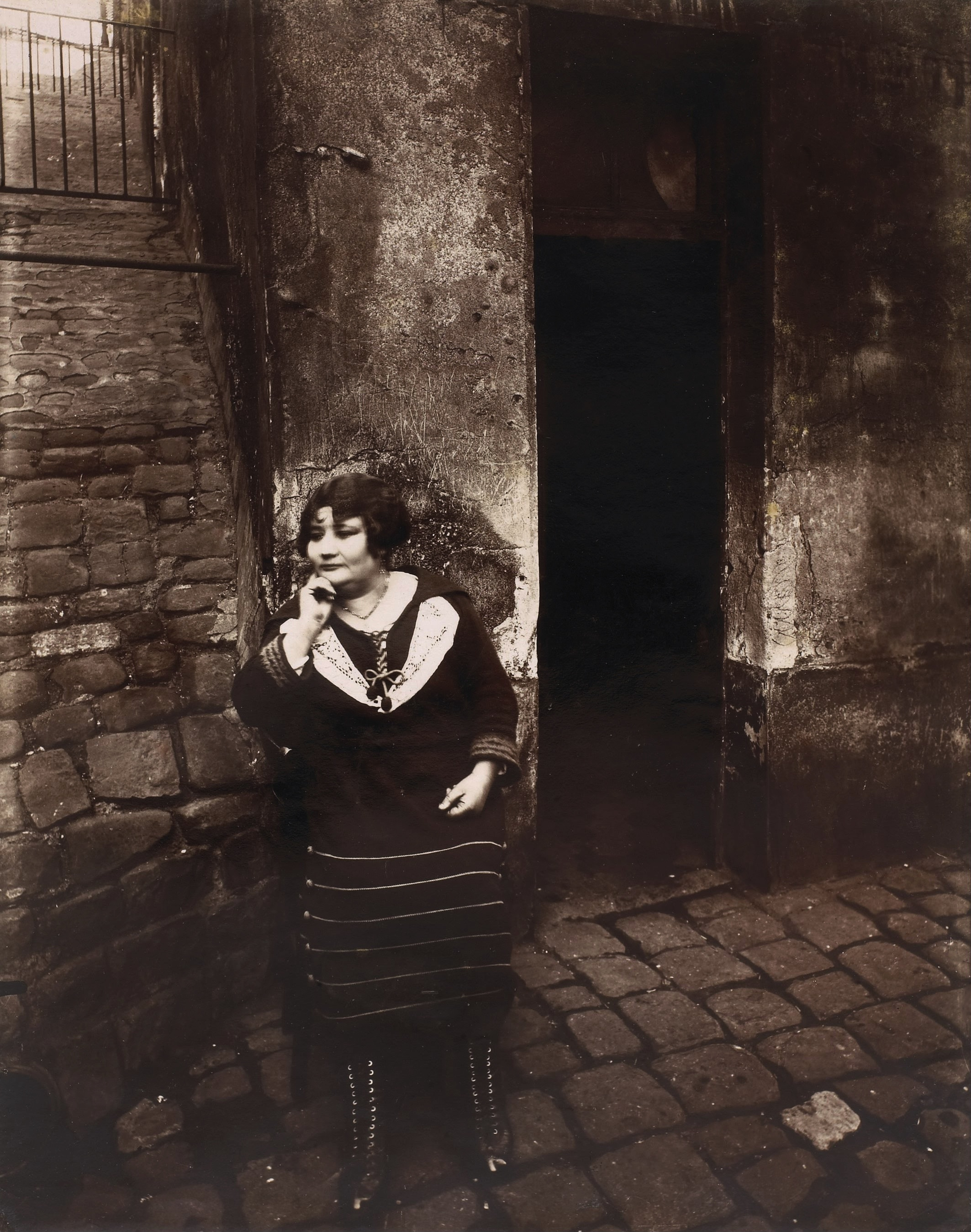
Eugène Atget: Rue Asselin, prostitute waiting in front of her door in 1921

=== Public spaces ===
Until the late 1980s, prostitution in the Rue Saint-Denis extended from the Les Halles to the Porte Saint-Denis. Once the hotels and studios were closed, the majority of the prostitutes left and the average age those who remained increased. In the past, the street has accommodated up to 2,000 women.

The majority of prostitutes in the Bois de Boulogne are immigrants, and they group themselves in the woods by nationality. Prostitution in the woods of Bois de Vincennes is different, it is carried out mainly in vans. Prostitutes protect each other and improve their security by consolidating the vehicles in the same locations.

Chinese prostitution in Paris began in the late 1990s. Chinese prostitutes work mainly on the streets of some neighbourhoods, where they are nicknamed les marcheuses (the walkers). They also work in massage parlours or from the internet. In 2016, Médecins du Monde estimated that there were 1,450 Chinese prostitutes in Paris.

=== Internet ===
Following the solicitation law of 2003, prostitution on the internet developed strongly. In 2002, 108 sites covered Paris, then in 2003 the number of Paris sites increased to 482, in 2004 the figure almost doubled with 816 sites.

== Neighbourhoods and streets related to prostitution ==
Several street names refer to the prostitution activities they housed:

- Rue Brisemiche and rue Baillehoë, which means "Give Joy": in 1388 residents of Saint Merri started a petition demanding the expulsion of "wenches", traders opposed it because of trade from the women. Now part of Rue Brisemiche in the 4th arrondissement.
- Rue Gratte-Cul (Scrape-Ass Street), now Rue Dussoubs in the 2nd arrondissement.
- Rue Maubuée (Dirty Washing Street). Now Rue de Venise in the 2nd arrondissement.
- Rue du Poil-au-Con (Hairy Bottom Street). Now Rue du Pélican, in the 1st arrondissement.
- Rue Pute-y-Musse: pute meaning whore and musse which means stroll in Old French. Now called Rue du Petit-Musc and is in the 4th arrondissement.
- Rue Tire-Vit, vit is synonymous with "penis", Latin vectis, a bar or a lever. The street is now called Rue Marie-Stuart and is in the 2nd arrondissement.
- Rue Trace-Putain, later rue Tasse-Nonnain, putain and nonnain are old names for prostitutes. it was later absorbed into Rue Beaubourg in the 3rd arrondissement.
- Rue Trousse-Nonnain (Fuck Nun Street). Now Rue Beaubourg in the 3rd & 4th arrondissements.
- Rue Troussevache - now rue de La Reynie in the 1st & 4th arrondissements.

== In art ==
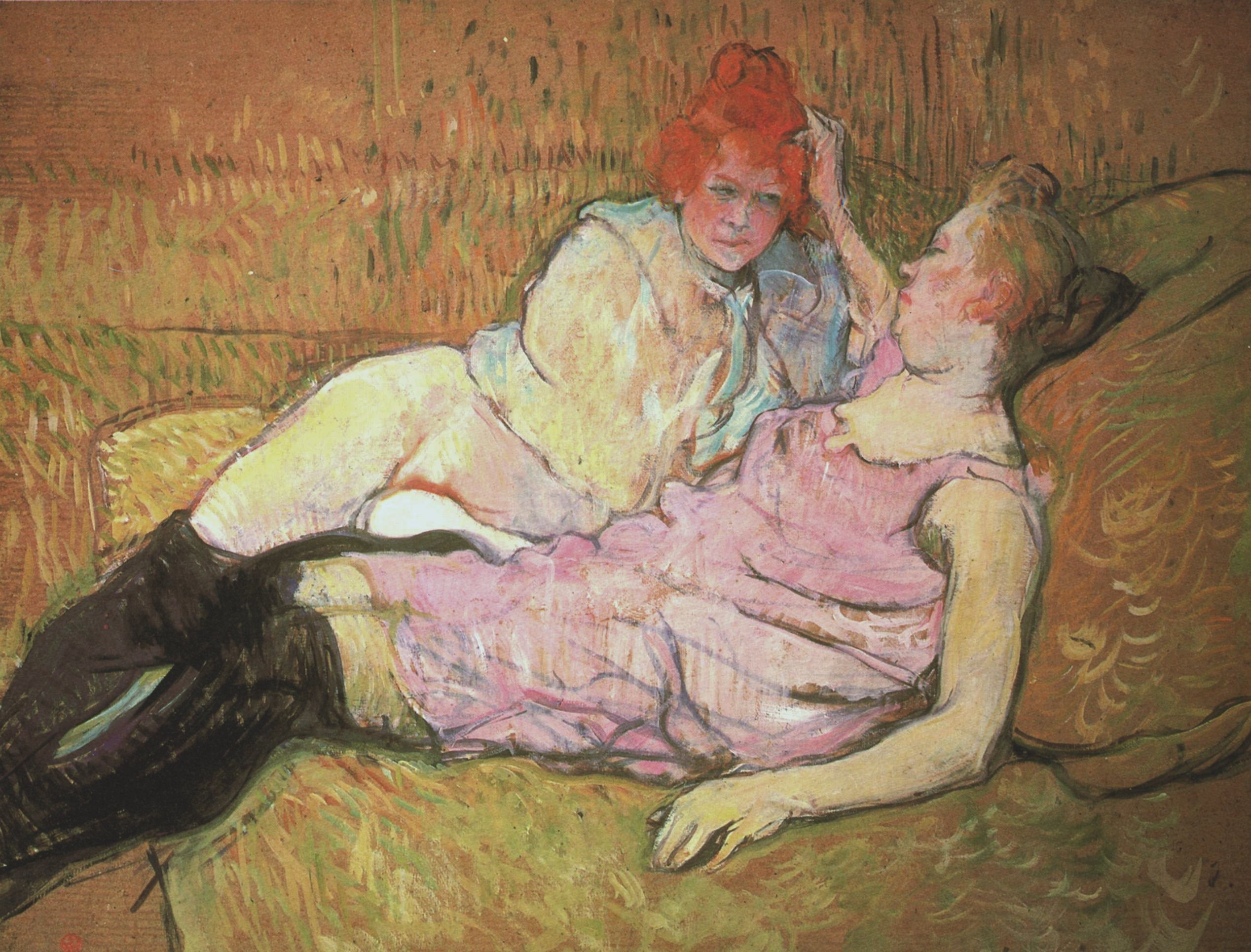
The Sofa Henri de Toulouse-Lautrec c. 1895

Charles Baudelaire is quoted as saying "What is art? - Prostitution." In 2015, the Musée d'Orsay presented the exhibition Splendeurs et miseries. Images of Prostitution, 1850-1910. It was a collection of works in the fields of painting, sculpture and photography.

=== Painting ===
Nicolas Sarkozy recognised that the traditional sex worker was part of France's national cultural heritage. Paintings and drawings of maisons closes (brothels), and prostitution appear frequently in art over the centuries. Some of the best known are scenes in brothels produced by Henri de Toulouse-Lautrec, Edgar Degas and Pablo Picasso, among others. Impressionist works depicting the prostitute often became the subject of scandal, and particularly venomous criticism. Some works showed her with considerable sympathy, while others attempted to impart an agency to her; likewise some work showed high-class courtesans, and others prostitutes awaiting clients on the streets.

=== Literature ===
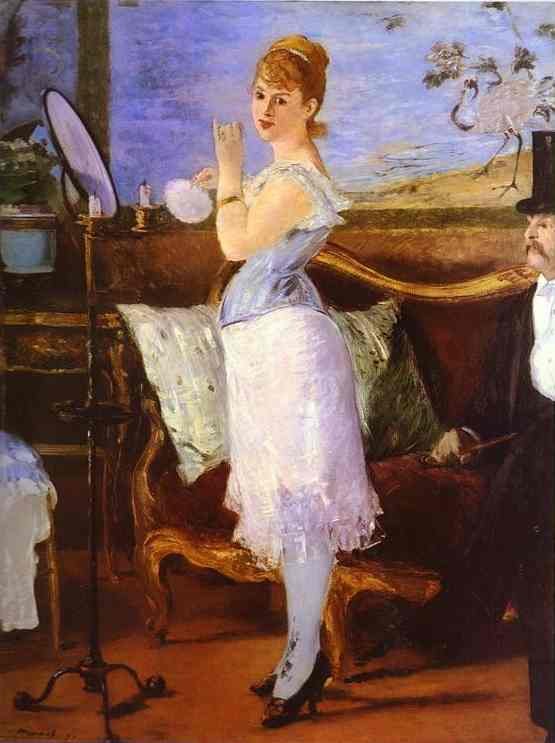
Nana Édouard Manet 1877

In the novel Nana, Émile Zola dealt with the theme of female prostitution through the journey of a lorette to a cocotte, whose charms bewitched the highest dignitaries of the Second Empire. He was inspired by Blanche d'Antigny and his first love, Berthe. The novelist also included elements of Valtesse de La Bigne and Delphine de Lizy.

In Quiet Days in Clichy, the writer Henry Miller recounts his bohemian life in Paris during the 1930s. He treasures "the impression of a little paradise on earth," detailing his sexual adventures with prostitutes, "On a gray day, when it was cold everywhere except in large cafes, I tasted in advance the pleasure of spending an hour or two at Wepler before going to dinner. The pink glow that surrounded the whole room came from the whores who usually gathered near the entrance ... The corner where they met was like the Stock Exchange where the sex market, which had its ups and downs, like any market. As the saying goes, there are only two things to do when it rains and whores never waste their time playing cards".

Amongst writers depicting the life of women in prostitution in France are Honoré de Balzac and Victor Hugo.

=== Cinema ===
In the early 1930s, the film Faubourg Montmartre retraces the dramatic story of two sisters. One of them seeks to lead the other into a life of lust. While one loses her job, the other sinks into prostitution and drugs. However love still offers a second chance...

The Musée de l'Erotisme in Paris devotes one floor to the maisons closes. It exhibits Polissons et galipettes, a collection of short erotic silent movies that were used to entertain brothel visitors, and copies of Le Guide Rose, a contemporary brothel guide that also carried advertising. The 2003 BBC Four documentary Storyville - Paris Brothel describes the maisons closes.

=== Photography ===
Documentary photographer Eugène Atget photographed street scenes and architecture in Paris between 1897 and 1927. Many of these street scenes included prostitutes.

Brassaï published photographs of brothels in his 1935 book Voluptés de Paris. A voluminous illustrated work on the phenomenon is Maisons closes. L'histoire, l'art, la littérature, les moeurs by Romi (Robert Miquet), first published in 1952.

In 1971, photographer Jane Evelyn Atwood moved to Paris. She began to photograph the world of prostitution in Paris in 1976, especially in the Rue des Lombards and Quartier Pigalle.

== Notes and references ==
=== Bibliography ===
- Corbin, Alain (2011). Les filles de noce: Misère sexuelle et prostitution au XIXè siècle (in French). Flammarion. ISBN 9782081261082.
- Géraud, Hercule (1837). Paris sous Philippe - le - Bel: d'après des documents originaux et notamment d'après un manuscript contenant Le Rôle de la taille imposée sur les habitants de Paris en 1292 (in French). Crapelet.
- Gangoli, Geetanjali; Westmarland, Nicole (31 May 2006). International Approaches to Prostitution. Policy Press. ISBN 9781861346728.
- Gonzalez-Quijano, Lola (2015). Capitale de l'amour - Filles et lieux de plaisir à Paris au XIXe siècle. Vendémiaire.
- Lemonier, Marc (2015). Guide historique du Paris libertin (in French). Groupe CB. ISBN 9782842716707.
- Mollier, Jean-Yves (2018). Chez Wepler, 14 place Clichy (in French). Paris: Édition Michel Beissières.
- Mossuz-Lavau, Janine; Handman, Marie-Elisabeth (2005). "La prostitution à Paris, 2004". Les Annales de la Recherche Urbaine (in French). 98 (1): 197–198.
- Mossuz-Lavau, Janine (2015). La prostitution (in French). Dalloz. ISBN 9782247139323.
- Plumauzille, Clyde (1 December 2013). "Le "marché aux putains" : économies sexuelles et dynamiques spatiales du Palais-Royal dans le Paris révolutionnaire". Genre, Sexualité & Société (in French) (10). doi:10.4000/gss.2943. ISSN 2104-3736.
- Plumauzille, Clyde (2016). Prostitution et Révolution: Les Femmes publiques dans la cité républicaine (1789-1804) (in French). Champ Vallon. ISBN 9791026700678.
- Plumauzille, Clyde (2020). "Sex as Work: Public Women in Revolutionary Paris",
- Robb, Graham (2010). Parisians: An Adventure History of Paris. Picador. ISBN 9780330452441.
- White, Edmund (2001). The Flâneur: A Stroll Through the Paradoxes of Paris. London: Bloomsbury Publishing. ISBN 978-1582342122.
