= Rough Cut Comics =

Scottish comic book publishing company

- Founded: 1999
- Founder: Ed Murphy; Colin Barr; David McBride; Jaeson Finn
- Country of origin: Scotland
- Headquarters location: Glasgow
- Publication types: Comic books, graphic novels, trade paperbacks
- Fiction genres: Horror, Superhero
- Official website: Official website

Rough Cut Comics is a Scottish comic book publisher based in Glasgow.

== History ==
Ed Murphy, Colin Barr, David McBride and comic-book artist Jaeson Finn founded Rough Cut Comics in 1999 to

[..] create a publishing house to produce comic-book projects based upon – and to inspire – feature film and video game packages.

Rough Cut's first title was The Surgeon, published in 2001. The Surgeon was based on a horror film script that never came to fruition. It sold more than 7.000 copies and has been translated into different languages, among them German, where it was published by Weissblech Comics, French and Italian. Another comic based on horror films is the adaption of Brian Yuzna's Society; the current series is the sequel Society: Party Animal written by Colin Barr with art by Shelby Robertson for issue 1 and Neill Cameron for issue 2.

The title Freedom Collective, published in 2009, garnered praise from Grant Morrison and Alex Ross, and was mentioned by the Jack Kirby Collector and comic magazine Wizard, as well as becoming one of new distributor UKonDisplay's biggest selling titles at their launch earlier that year. In July 2014, their GoodCopBadCop: Casebook#1 title won the True Believers Award for Best British BW Comic-book.

== Creators ==
Apart from company founders Colin Barr and Ed Murphy, Rough Cut Comics has featured works by Jaeson Finn, Shelby Robertson, Neill Cameron, Joel Carpenter, Dave Alexander, Will Pickering, Luke Cooper, Garry McLaughlin, Alex Ronald, Curt Sibling and Derek Dow, among others.

== Selected Titles ==
- GoodCopBadCop: Casebook#2
- GoodCopBadCop: Casebook#1
- Amanda Swan: The Hellfire Legacy
- Freedom Collective (one-shot)
- Compulsory Freedom Collective (trade paperback)
- Green Pages (b/w magazine)
- Rose Black Book 1 (Graphic Novel)
- Rose Black: Demon Seed (Graphic novel)
- Society
- Society: Party Animal
- The Surgeon (mini-series)
- The Surgeon: Timelines (one-shot)
