= Rough Cuts (radio series) =

Blog and podcast published by National Public Radio

Rough Cuts is a blog and podcast published by National Public Radio. The purpose of the project is to invite the public to participate in the development of new radio programs. Traditionally, radio programs would be created behind closed doors, then premiered when they were adequately polished for public consumption. Rough Cuts takes a different approach, publishing rough drafts of radio segments and soliciting public feedback. The feedback is then used to improve the quality of the show, in the hopes of premiering a better radio program. NPR describes this process as "open piloting," its name inspired by the open source and open content movements.

The first radio show to "graduate" from Rough Cuts is Tell Me More, hosted by journalist Michel Martin. That program began national production in April, 2007. Rough Cuts will also be used to help develop a new morning radio program targeting a younger audience. That program, tentatively titled The Bryant Park Project, seeks to compete with Morning Edition. Bryant Park may be offered on digital sub-channels of a station's frequency, or as a stream on the station's website. Hosted by Luke Burbank and Alison Stewart, the Bryant Park Project will be produced at NPR's New York bureau, and is expected to launch in September 2007.

Rough Cuts is not the first radio project to involve public participation. Other examples include WGBH's Open Source and the BBC's World Have Your Say .

== See also ==
- Crowdsourcing
- National Public Radio
