= Larry Wade Carrell =

American actor, writer and director

Larry Wade Carrell (born January 11, 1971) is an American actor, writer and director. He is known for his horror movie Jacob (2011). The film earned 16 awards worldwide including the Platinum Remi Award for Best Picture at the 45th Annual Worldfest International Film Festival. Jacob was well received by critics gaining Larry a solid fan base as a director and actor in the multimillion-dollar indie film world, and the film went on to be released worldwide. He lives in Houston, Texas.

== Early life and career ==
Larry was the born in the small Texas town of Alvin to the parents of Frances and Wade Carrell. Larry Carrell's passion for entertaining began very early in life. Larry started playing guitar at age 3. By the age of 10 he was a talented guitarist, performing all over the state of Texas. Naturally, his love of music led to an interest in movies.

== Filmography ==
Year	Film	Role
2009	Game Over: The Secret Life of Game Store Clerks	Bruce
2010	Itch	Outdoor Ken
2010	Floodwaters	Director
2010	Done	Writer, Sam
2011	Garage Band: The Mini-Musical	Assistant Art Director
2011	AXI: Avengers of eXtreme Illusions	Gang Leader / Swat Team Commander
2011	Jacob	Director, writer, Billy, Otis Keller
2012	In Fear Of	Mickey
2013	The Journey of Jacob	Himself
2013	Conjoined	Phil
2013	More Than Human	Marcus Daniels
2013	The Preacher's Daughter	Larry the Potty Guy
2014	To the Bridge	Mike
2014	Lars the Emo Kid	Clown with Gun #2
2014	Doll Factory	Deputy Donnie Harris
2014	Legend of DarkHorse County	Present Sheriff McElroy
2014	The Girl	Supervising Producer, Production Manager
2014	Hidden in the Woods	Bartender, Unit Production Manager
2015	Altered Perception	Lewis, Production Manager
2016	The Ghosts of Garip a.k.a. Kanli Girdap or Vlad's Legacy	Brad
2017	200 Degrees	Bruce, Art Director
2017	She Rises	Director, Hitchhicker
2021	Girl Next	Director, Sheriff Maddox
2023	The Quantum Devil	Director
2023	The Darkside of Society	Director
