= Kevin Quinn (wrestler) =

American professional wrestler

Personal information
- Born: April 11, 1972 (age 54) Chicago, Illinois, U.S.

Professional wrestling career
- Ring name: Kevin Quinn
- Billed height: 6 ft 1 in (185 cm)
- Billed weight: 235 lb (107 kg)
- Trained by: Sam DeCero
- Debut: 1992
- Retired: 2003

Kevin Quinn (born April 11, 1972) is an American professional wrestler and trainer who wrestled in the Illinois independent circuit. He has made appearances in the World Wrestling Federation, World Wrestling Council in Puerto Rico, and Consejo Mundial de Lucha Libre in Mexico.

== Professional wrestling career ==
After being trained by Sam DeCero, Quinn began his career in 1992, making his debut in the Illinois-based Windy City Pro Wrestling. He won the WCPW Tag Team Championship with Christopher Daniels. Quinn traveled to Puerto Rico to wrestle for the World Wrestling Council, and on October 22, 1995, teamed with Daniels (as the team of Overkill) to defeat Huracán Castillo Jr. and Invader I for the WWC World Tag Team Championship. They lost the titles a month later to The Canadian Glamour Boys (Val Venis and Shane Sewell).

In 1997, Quinn made an appearance for Extreme Championship Wrestling.

From 1997 to 1998, Quinn went to Mexico to work for Consejo Mundial de Lucha Libre (CMLL) competing in tag matches.

Daniels teamed with Kevin Quinn to defeat Danny Dominion and Ace Steele at the NWA's 50th Anniversary show in October 1998 to become the first NWA Midwest Tag Team Champions.

In 1998, Quinn worked for the World Wrestling Federation. He defeated Brian Christopher in a pre-show for Rock Bottom: In Your House for Sunday Night Heat. Afterwards, Quinn teamed up with Brian Christopher temporarily while Scott Taylor was injured with a broken leg. They defeated the Hardy Boyz the next week. Then they had a no contest against the Disciples of Apocalypse. Then Quinn, Christopher and the Hardy Boyz lost to the J.O.B. Squad on December 29, 1998 (aired January 9, 1999) on Shotgun Saturday Night.

After WWF, Quinn returned to Puerto Rico in 1999. He later returned to the independent circuit and retired in 2003.

== Personal life ==
Quinn trained many wrestlers like Christopher Daniels, Lita, CM Punk, TJ Perkins, and other wrestlers.

== Championships and accomplishments ==
- Windy City Pro Wrestling
  - WCPW Middleweight Championship (1 time)
  - WCPW Tag Team Championship (2 times) – with Christopher Daniels (1) and Mike Samson (1)
- World Wrestling Council
  - WWC World Tag Team Championship (1 time) – with Kevin Quinn
