= Andrew Anderson (wrestler) =

American professional wrestler, promoter, actor and author

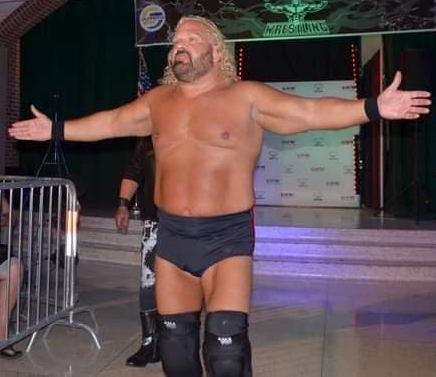
- Andrew Anderson in 2021

Personal information
- Born: Andrew Koloszuk; October 22, 1967 (age 59) Cliffside Park, New Jersey, United States
- Education: St. Peter's College

Professional wrestling career
- Ring name: Andrew Anderson
- Billed height: 6 ft 2 in (188 cm)
- Billed weight: 396 lb (180 kg)
- Billed from: Ridgefield, New Jersey, United States
- Trained by: Jimmy Snuka; Gino Caruso; Kodiak Bear; Mike Masters; Nikolai Volkoff; Jerry Fazio
- Debut: 1993

Andrew Koloszuk (born October 22, 1967), better known by the ring name "Baby Gorilla" Andrew Anderson, is an American professional wrestler, promoter, actor and author. Anderson is currently working on the independent circuit primarily for East Coast Professional Wrestling (ECPW), Southwest Wrestling Entertainment (SWE) and Ultimate Championship Wrestling (UCW). Koloszuk is co-founder of Tri-State Wrestling Alliance (formerly National Wrestling Alliance (NWA) Big Apple).

== Professional wrestling career ==
=== Early career (1993–1999) ===
Koloszuk began his career in 1993, He was discovered by WWE Hall of Famer Jimmy Snuka and "Metal Maniac" Jeff Miller. Initially Koloszuk was trained by Jimmy Snuka and Gino Caruso at Caruso's East Coast Pro Wrestling(ECPW) gym in Lake Hiawatha, New Jersey. Koloszuk was later trained by Kodiak Bear, Mike Masters, Nikolai Volkoff, and Jerry Fazio. From 1993 to 1999 Koloszuk performed in various independent wrestling companies across the United States, including Jersey All Pro Wrestling (JAPW), Pennsylvania Championship Wrestling (PCW) and Hawaiian Islands Wrestling Federation (HIWF). In 1997, Koloszuk wrestled under the ring name The Siberian Tiger a name he adopted while working as a tag team with Nikolai Volkoff. Koloszuk, was frequently managed throughout his career by; Captain Lou Albano, Godfather Joey G, Doug Devito, Roddy Piper, Mr. Big John Whol, and Nigel Rabid. Angelo Savoldi, at the time a wrestling promoter, influenced Koloszuk to change his ring name.

=== Jersey Championship Wrestling (2000–2002) ===
In early 2000 Koloszuk began performing for Jersey Championship Wrestling. On April 14, 2000, taping an episode of Jersey Championship Wrestling, Anderson defeated Nick Maddox in a tournament final to become the inaugural JCW Heavyweight Champion. Eight days later on April 22, 2000, Anderson was defeated by Low Ki, losing the JCW Heavyweight Championship title. After 2002, Anderson took a hiatus from wrestling.

=== East Coast Professional Wrestling (2005 – Current) ===
Anderson began performing for East Coast Professional Wrestling (ECPW) in 2005. ECPW is owned by Gino Caruso, one of the men who trained Anderson. During his time with ECPW, Anderson has become a 4 time ECPW Heavyweight Champion, an ECPW Television Champion and an ECPW Tag Team Champion with The Pub Bully twice.

==== United Pro Wrestling Association (2006–2007) ====
Between mid 2006 and mid 2007 Anderson performed in matches for United Pro Wrestling Association (UPWA).

==== Pro Wrestling 225 (2019) ====
On July 21, 2019, at the Pro Wrestling 225 event Collision Course Anderson teamed with Mustang Mike defeated The Cajun Outlawz C-Thang & Rhett The Threat to become the PW225 Tag Team Champions. The reign lasted for 45 days before the titles were vacated.

=== Tri-State Wrestling Alliance (2016 – Current) ===
Anderson co-founded National Wrestling Alliance (NWA) Big Apple in 2016. In 2017 the company cut ties with NWA and the name was changed to Tri-State Wrestling Alliance (TSWA).

=== Southwest Wrestling Entertainment (2020–2020) ===
In early 2020 Anderson began performing in matches for Southwest Wrestling Entertainment (SWE).

=== Ultimate Championship Wrestling (2021 – Current) ===
Anderson is currently the UCW Warfare Heavyweight Champion, in 2022 Anderson is set to make his debut for World Pro Wrestling in the United Kingdom. Anderson took on James Mason at Cheltenham Town Hall for World Pro Wrestling on Saturday February 19.

== Acting career ==
Koloszuk also pursued a career in acting, appearing in both film and television.

Koloszuk plays the role of the character Hammond Egger in the 2004 Spike Lee Showtime television film "Sucker Free City".

Koloszuk was an extra in the 2008 American sports drama film "The Wrestler".

Koloszuk has also starred in commercials for Doritos and Skittles.

== Writing career ==
Koloszuk is the author of his upcoming autobiography, "It's Really Not My Fault".

== Personal life ==
Although he was billed as such, Koloszuk is not related to Arn Anderson or any other members of the Anderson family.

Koloszuk graduated from St. Peter's College in Jersey City, New Jersey in 1989 with a degree in business administration and a BA in marketing management.

Koloszuk has two daughters and one son.

== Filmography ==
Film
Year	Title	Role	Notes	Ref.
2003	Creepy Tales: Girls Night Out	The Werewolf		
2008	The Wrestler	Wrestler		
2015	Fortress of Dumbbells	Deadbeat Deadwood	short film	
2017	Good Friday	Man Myth Magic	short film	
2018	350 Days – Legends. Champions. Survivors.	Himself	documentary	
TBA	The Killer Bees	Himself	documentary, pre-production	
TBA	Blade & Blood	Crank	pre-production	
TBA	Deadly Terrain	Drew Lewis	pre-production	

Television
Year	Title	Role	Notes	Ref.
2004	Sucker Free City	Hammond Egger	television film	
2009	Söndagsparty med Filip och Fredrik	Himself	Swedish talk show, Episode: "Manson och Gardell i premiären"	
2017	Gotham	Secondary Demon	Season 4, episode 7: "A Dark Knight: A Day in the Narrows"	
2018	Sneaky Pete	Clerk	Season 2, episode 3: "Man on the Run"	
2018	Confessions of Nick Sargenti and the Lolipop Gang	Johnny Five	Season 1, episode 1: "Jaw Breaker"	

Web Series
Year	Title	Role	Notes	Ref.
2014	Creative Continuity	Himself	Episode: "Joshua Williamson & Andrew Anderson"	

== Championships and accomplishments ==
- Cauliflower Alley Club
  - Men's Wrestling Award (2019)
- Champion Wrestling Federation
  - CWF Heavyweight Championship (2 times)
- CyberSpace Wrestling Federation
  - CyberSpace Tag Team Championship (1 time, inaugural) – with Billy Firehawk
- East Coast Professional Wrestling
  - ECPW Tri-State Brass Knuckle Championship (1 time)
  - ECPW Heavyweight Championship (4 times)
  - ECPW Television Championship (1 time)
  - ECPW Tag Team Championship (2 times) – with The Pub Bully
- Gulf State Wrestling
  - GSW Louisiana Heavyweight Championship (1 time)
  - GSW Tag Team Championship (1 time) – with Mustang Mike
- Jersey Championship Wrestling
  - JCW Heavyweight Championship (1 time, inaugural)
- Pro Wrestling 225
  - PW225 Tag Team Championship (1 time) – with Mustang Mike
- Renegade Wrestling Alliance
  - RWA Heavyweight Championship (1 time)
- Tri-State Wrestling Alliance
  - TSWA Heavyweight Championship (1 time, current)
- Ultimate Championship Wrestling
  - Warfare Heavyweight Championship (1 time, current)
