= WCPW Heavyweight Championship =

Professional wrestling championship

Details
- Promotion: Windy City Pro Wrestling
- Date established: April 13, 1988
- Date retired: December 16, 2010

Other name
- WCW Heavyweight Championship
Statistics
- First champion: Steve Regal
- Final champion: Sean Mulligan
- Most reigns: Sean Mulligan (4)
- Longest reign: Ripper Manson (1,092 days)
- Shortest reign: Sean Mulligan (<1 day)

The WCPW Heavyweight Championship was a professional wrestling heavyweight championship in Windy City Pro Wrestling (WCPW). It was the original top singles championship for the promotion before the creation of the WCPW League Championship in 1993 and its incorporation into the then newly created weight-class division as a legitimate heavyweight title (over 240 lbs). It was eventually unified with the Bare Knuckles and League Championships to create the "WCPW World Heavyweight Championship".

The inaugural champion was "Mr. Electric" Steve Regal, who won the title in Chicago, Illinois on April 13, 1988 to become the first WCPW Heavyweight Champion. Sean Mulligan holds the record for most reigns, with four. At 1,092 days, Ripper Manson's first and only reign is the longest in the title's history. He is the only wrestler in the promotion's history to retire as champion. Mulligan's second reign was the shortest in the history of the title as it was returned to him on the same night as he lost it. Overall, there have been 25 reigns shared between 17 wrestlers, with four vacancies, and 1 deactivation.

== Title history ==
Key

| # | Order in reign history |
| Reign | The reign number for the specific set of wrestlers listed |
| Event | The event in which the title was won |
| — | Used for vacated reigns so as not to count it as an official reign |
| N/A | The information is not available or is unknown |
| + | Indicates the current reign is changing daily |

=== Names ===
| Name | Years |
|---|---|
| WCW Heavyweight Championship | 1988 — 1996 |
| WCPW Heavyweight Championship | 1997 — 2008 |
| WCPW World (Unified) Heavyweight Championship | 2008 — 2010 |

=== Reigns ===
| # | Wrestlers | Reign | Date | Days held | Location | Event | Notes | Ref. |
|---|---|---|---|---|---|---|---|---|
| 1 | Steve Regal | 1 | April 13, 1988 | 619 | Chicago, Illinois | Live event | | |
| 2 | Frank Melson | 1 | December 23, 1989 | 126 | Harvard, Illinois | Live event | | |
| 3 | Hurricane Smith | 1 | April 28, 1990 | 238 | Dixon, Illinois | Live event | | |
| 4 | Frank Melson | 2 | December 22, 1990 | 147 | Harvard, Illinois | Live event | | |
| 5 | Ron Powers | 1 | May 18, 1991 | 421 | Chicago, Illinois | Live event | | |
| 6 | K.C. Knight | 1 | July 12, 1992 | 664 | Stone Park, Illinois | Live event | | |
| 7 | Mike Samson | 1 | May 7, 1994 | 952 | Hammond, Indiana | Live event | | |
| 8 | Mike Anthony | 1 | December 14, 1996 | 938 | Hammond, Indiana | Live event | | |
| 9 | The Polish Crippler | 1 | July 10, 1999 | 88 | Chicago, Illinois | Live event | | |
| 10 | Killer Khalsa Singh | 1 | October 6, 1999 | N/A | Schaumburg, Illinois | Live event | | |
| — | Vacated | — | November 1999 | — | N/A | N/A | The championship is vacated when Singh is stripped of the title. | |
| 11 | The Polish Crippler | 2 | December 11, 1999 | 161 | N/A | Season's Beatings (1999) | The Polish Crippler won the vacant championship in a tournament final. | |
| 12 | Willie Richardson | 1 | May 20, 2000 | 371 | Hammond, Indiana | Battle of the Belts 12 (2000) | | |
| 13 | Steve Boz | 1 | May 26, 2001 | 82 | Hammond, Indiana | Battle of the Belts 13 (2001) | | |
| 14 | Willie Richardson | 2 | August 16, 2001 | 107 | Fairbury, Illinois | Live event | | |
| 15 | Steve Boz | 2 | December 1, 2001 | 168 | Chicago, Illinois | Live event | | |
| 16 | Ripper Manson | 1 | May 18, 2002 | 1,092 | Cicero, Illinois | Live event | | |
| — | Vacated | — | May 14, 2005 | — | Hammond, Indiana | Battle of the Belts 17 (2002) | Manson defeated Larry Zbyszko in what would be his final match. He was the first and only wrestler to retire as champion. The championship is subsequently vacated due to Manson's retirement. | |
| 17 | Vito Fontaine | 1 | 2005 | N/A | N/A | Live event | | |
| 18 | Baltazar | 1 | June 24, 2006 | N/A | Midlothian, Illinois | Live event | | |
| — | Vacated | — | June 2007 | — | N/A | N/A | The championship is vacated when Night Breed (Abaddon and Baltazar) leave the promotion to join the rival Vanguard Wrestling All-Star Alliance. | |
| 19 | Austin Roberts | 1 | October 26, 2007 | 561 | Chicago, Illinois | Monster Bash (2009) | Roberts defeated Sean Mulligan in a tournament final to win the vacant championship. On May 17, 2008, the title was unified with the Bare Knuckles and League Championships to create the "WCPW World Heavyweight Championship". | |
| 20 | Sean Mulligan | 1 | May 9, 2009 | 62 | Calumet City, Illinois | Battle of the Belts 21 (2009) | | |
| 21 | Psycho | 1 | July 10, 2009 | 36 | Bridgeview, Illinois | Legends Under the Stars (2009) | Psycho won all of WCPW's singles titles, with exception to the lightweight championship, in a "Pot of Gold" battle royal. On August 15, 2009, due to his controversial victory, he was ordered by WCPW promoter Sam DeCero to defend his titles in a second battle royal during "Hot Summer Nights". He failed to win and the titles were returned to the previous champions. | |
| 21 | Sean Mulligan | 2 | August 15, 2009 | <1 | Chicago, Illinois | Hot Summer Nights (2009) | The heavyweight championship was returned to Mulligan when the titles were returned to the previous champions. | |
| 22 | Mike Anthony | 2 | August 15, 2009 | 70 | Chicago, Illinois | Hot Summer Nights (2009) | | |
| 23 | Sean Mulligan | 3 | October 24, 2009 | 119 | Chicago, Illinois | Monster Bash (2009) | | |
| 24 | Bailey Mannix | 1 | February 20, 2010 | 210 | Chicago, Illinois | Live event | | |
| — | Vacated | — | September 18, 2010 | — | Chicago, Illinois | WCPW Studio Show | The championship is vacated when WCPW "general manager" Psycho strips all champions of their titles. | |
| 25 | Sean Mulligan | 4 | September 18, 2010 | 89 | Chicago, Illinois | WCPW Studio Show | Defeated Justin Reno to win the vacant championship. | |
| — | Deactivated | — | December 16, 2010 | — | N/A | N/A | WCPW merged with Chicago Pro Wrestling Academy on December 16, 2010, to form Dynasty Sports Entertainment and Mulligan was the final champion in WCPW as a company. | |

== Combined reigns ==
| <1 | Indicates that the reign lasted less than one day. |

| Rank | Wrestler | No. of reigns | Combined days |
|---|---|---|---|
| 1 | Ripper Manson | 1 | 1,092 |
| 2 | Mike Anthony | 2 | 1,008 |
| 3 | Mike Samson | 1 | 952 |
| 4 | K.C. Knight | 1 | 664 |
| 5 | Steve Regal | 1 | 619 |
| 6 | Austin Roberts | 1 | 561 |
| 7 | Ron Powers | 1 | 421 |
| 8 | Willie Richardson | 2 | 478 |
| 9 | Frank Melson | 2 | 273 |
| 10 | Sean Mulligan | 4 | 270 |
| 11 | Steve Boz | 2 | 250 |
| 12 | The Polish Crippler | 2 | 249 |
| 13 | Hurricane Smith | 1 | 238 |
| 14 | Bailey Mannix | 1 | 210 |
| 15 | Psycho | 1 | 36 |
