= WCPW Middleweight Championship =

Professional wrestling championship

Details
- Promotion: Windy City Pro Wrestling
- Date established: April 13, 1991
- Date retired: December 16, 2010

Other names
- WCW Middleweight Championship (1991–1996); WCPW Middleweight Championship (1997–2010)
Statistics
- First champion: K.C. Knight
- Final champions: Buddy Roberts, Jr. (won September 18, 2010)
- Most reigns: Mike Anthony (2); Chris Collins (2)
- Longest reign: Ripper Manson (455 days)
- Shortest reign: Mike Londos (<1 day)

The WCPW Middleweight Championship was a professional wrestling middleweight championship in Windy City Pro Wrestling (WCPW). It was the original secondary title for the promotion before the creation of the WCPW League Championship in 1993 and its incorporation into the then newly created weight-class division as a legitimate middleweight title (211 to 240 lbs).

The inaugural champion was K.C. Knight, who defeated Mike Samson in Hebron, Indiana on April 13, 1991 to become the first WCW Middleweight Champion. Mike Anthony and Chris "Curse" Collins are tied for the record for most reigns, with two each. At 455 days, Ripper Manson's reign is the longest in the title's history. "The Golden Greek" Mike Londos's reign was the shortest in the history of the title as he lost it to Stone Manson less than 10 minutes after having won the belt. Overall, there have been 27 reigns shared between 25 wrestlers, with three vacancies, and 1 deactivation.

== Title history ==
Key

#	Order in reign history
Reign	The reign number for the specific set of wrestlers listed
Event	The event in which the title was won
—	Used for vacated reigns so as not to count it as an official reign
N/A	The information is not available or is unknown

=== Names ===
Name	Years
WCW Middleweight Championship	1991 — 1996
WCPW Middleweight Championship	1997 — 2010

=== Reigns ===
No.	Wrestlers	Reign	Date	Days held	Location	Event	Notes	Ref.
1	K.C. Knight	1	April 13, 1991	322	Hebron, Indiana	Live event	Knight defeated Mike Samson to become the first WCW Middleweight Champion.	
2	Mike Samson	1	February 29, 1992	448	Barrington, Illinois	Live event		
3	Rick Valentino	1	May 22, 1993	336	Chicago, Illinois	Live event		
4	Kevin Quinn	1	April 23, 1994	392	Joliet, Illinois	Live event		
5	Ripper Manson	1	May 20, 1995	455	Hammond, Indiana	Live event		
6	Brett Sanders	1	August 17, 1996	257	Springfield, Illinois	Live event		
7	Christopher Daniels	1	May 1, 1997	16	Ponce, Puerto Rico	Live event		
8	Brandon Bishop	1	May 17, 1997	364	Cicero, Illinois	Live event		
9	Staff Sgt. Storm	1	May 16, 1998	371	Cicero, Illinois	Live event		
10	Mike Londos	1	May 22, 1999	<1	Cicero, Illinois	Live event		
11	Stone Manson	1	May 22, 1999	371	Cicero, Illinois	Live event		
12	Valyk	1	May 27, 2000	175	Crete, Illinois	Live event		
13	Jeffro King	1	November 18, 2000	156	Chicago, Illinois	Live event		
14	Baltazar	1	April 23, 2001	145	Chicago, Illinois	Live event		
15	Mike Anthony	1	September 15, 2001	245	Chicago, Illinois	Live event		
16	Ivan Manson	1	May 18, 2002	294	Cicero, Illinois	Live event		
17	Abaddon	1	March 8, 2003	N/A	Chicago, Illinois	March to Victory (2003)		
18	Cameron Cage	1	N/A	N/A	N/A	Live event		
19	Cassius XL	1	March 12, 2005	66	Chicago, Illinois	Lee Sanders Memorial Tournament (2005)	This was a tournament final.	
20	Mike Anthony	2	May 17, 2005	N/A	Hammond, Indiana	Battle of the Belts 17 (2005)	This was a Triple Threat match.	
21	Curse	1	2005	N/A	N/A	Live event		
—	Vacated	—	2006	—	N/A	N/A		
22	Gavin Dunn	1	2007	N/A	N/A	N/A		
—	Vacated	—	April 8, 2008	—	Chicago, Illinois	Lee Sanders Memorial Tournament (2008)	Dunn voluntarily relinquished the championship to wrestle Curse in a "career vs. career" match at Battle of the Belts 20.	
23	Chris Collins	2	March 14, 2009	118	Chicago, Illinois	Lee Sanders Memorial Tournament (2009)	Defeated Sean Mulligan in a tournament final to win the vacant championship.	
24	Psycho	1	July 10, 2009	36	Bridgeview, Illinois	Legends Under the Stars (2009)	Psycho won all of WCPW's singles titles, with exception to the lightweight championship, in a "Pot of Gold" battle royal. On August 15, 2009, due to his controversial victory, he was ordered by WCPW promoter Sam DeCero to defend his titles in a second battle royal during "Hot Summer Nights". He failed to win and the titles were returned to the previous champions.	
25	Barry Ryte	1	August 15, 2009	105	Chicago, Illinois	Hot Summer Nights (2009)	Ryte was awarded the vacant championship. The previous champion, Chris Collins, was stripped as champion due to undergoing back surjury.	
26	DTA	1	November 28, 2009	294	Chicago, Illinois	November to Remember (2009)		
—	Vacated	—	September 18, 2010	—	Chicago, Illinois	WCPW Studio Show	The championship is vacated when WCPW "general manager" Psycho strips all champions of their titles.	
27	Buddy Roberts, Jr.	1	September 18, 2010	89	Chicago, Illinois	WCPW Studio Show		
—	Deactivated	—	December 16, 2010	—	N/A	N/A	WCPW merged with Chicago Pro Wrestling Academy on December 16, 2010, to form Dynasty Sports Entertainment and Roberts was the final champion in WCPW as a company.	

== Combined reigns ==
Rank	Wrestler	No. of reigns	Combined days
1	Ripper Manson	1	455
2	Mike Samson	1	448
3	Kevin Quinn	1	392
4	Staff. Sgt. Storm	1	371
5	Stone Manson	1	371
6	Brandon Bishop	1	364
7	Rick Valentno	1	336
8	K.C. Knight	1	322
9	Ivan Manson	1	294
10	DTA	1	294
11	Brett Sanders	1	257
12	Mike Anthony	2	245
13	Valyk	1	175
14	Jeffro King	1	156
15	Baltazar	1	145
16	Chris Collins	2	118
17	Barry Ryte	1	105
18	Buddy Roberts, Jr.	1	89
19	Cassius XL	1	66
20	Psycho	1	36
21	Christopher Daniels	1	16
22	Mike Londos	1	<1
