= Mike Masters (wrestler) =

American professional wrestler (1954–2022)

Personal information
- Born: Michael Jones; November 7, 1954 Kearny, New Jersey, U.S.
- Died: August 8, 2022 (aged 67)

Professional wrestling career
- Ring name(s): Mike Masters; Mike Jones; Rocky Jones
- Billed height: 6 ft 0 in (183 cm)
- Billed weight: 240 lb (109 kg)
- Trained by: Johnny Rodz
- Debut: 1978
- Retired: 2021

Michael Jones (November 7, 1954 – August 8, 2022) was an American professional wrestler known as Mike Masters who worked in the World Wrestling Federation, Pacific Northwest Wrestling, National Wrestling Alliance and Japan in the 1980s. Later in his career, he worked in various independent promotions in New Jersey.

== Professional wrestling career ==
Jones made his professional wrestling debut in 1978 in the World Wide Wrestling Federation after being trained by Johnny Rodz. In 1979, the World Wide Wrestling Federation changed its name to World Wrestling Federation. He worked with the company as a jobber until 1980.

After leaving the WWF, Masters would make his first tour to Japan for New Japan Pro Wrestling in 1981. Later that year he made his debut in Portland, Oregon for Pacific Northwest Wrestling.

In 1982, he returned to the WWF. Then in 1983 he returned to Japan for All Japan Pro Wrestling as Rocky Jones. From 1984 to 1988, he worked in Georgia, Minnesota, and Vancouver.

Later in his career, he worked in the independent circuit in New Jersey most notably East Coast Pro Wrestling where he was their heavyweight champion two times.

Masters wrestled his final match on November 12, 2021, for East Coast Pro Wrestling in tag team where his team won in Franklin, New Jersey.

== Death ==
Jones died on August 8, 2022, from throat cancer. He was 67.

Jones appeared posthumously in the Tales from the Territories episode on Pacific Northwest Wrestling on November 7, 2022. At the end of the show a tribute is dedicated to Jones.

== Championships and accomplishments ==
- NWA Hollywood Wrestling/Worldwide Wrestling Associates
  - NWA Americas Heavyweight Championship (3 times)
- East Coast Pro Wrestling
  - ECPW Heavyweight Championship (1 time)
- Windy City Pro Wrestling
  - WCPW Lightweight Championship (1 time)
