= Gino Caruso (wrestler) =

American professional wrestler

Personal information
- Born: James Carullo; September 15, 1963 (age 62) Naples, Italy

Professional wrestling career
- Ring name(s): Gino Caruso; Funny Clown; The Great Caruso; Mr. Italy
- Billed height: 6 ft 1 in (1.85 m)
- Billed weight: 235 lb (107 kg)
- Trained by: Mike Masters
- Debut: 1988

James Carullo (born September 15, 1963), known by his ring name Gino Caruso, is an Italian-American professional wrestler and promoter best known for working in the Extreme Championship Wrestling, International World Class Championship Wrestling, East Coast Wrestling Association and various New Jersey promotions. He has been the promoter for East Coast Pro Wrestling in New Jersey since 1991.

== Professional wrestling career ==
Trained by Mike Masters, Caruso made his wrestling debut in 1987. In 1991, he became the promoter for East Coast Pro Wrestling in New Jersey which he still promotes as of 2025.

In 1992, he made his debut for Extreme Championship Wrestling. He worked for the ECW pay-per-view NWA Bloodfest. Part 1 he teamed with Silver Jet losing to the Public Enemy. The next night, part 2 he lost to Kevin Sullivan.

In 1995, he made a few appearances in World Championship Wrestling.

During the 1990s, Caruso worked in International World Class Championship Wrestling, East Coast Wrestling Association, and independent promotions in New Jersey.

In 2001, he took a hiatus from wrestling and continued training wrestlers and promoting his promotion East Coast Pro Wrestling.

In 2007, he came out of retirement wrestling for his promotion. As of 2025, he still wrestles at 61.

== Championships and accomplishments ==
- East Coast Pro Wrestling
  - ECPW Heavyweight Championship (2 times)
- Pro Wrestling Illustrated
  - PWI ranked him #358 of the top 500 singles wrestlers in the PWI 500 in 1997
  - PWI ranked him #362 of the top 500 singles wrestlers in the PWI 500 in 1996
  - PWI ranked him #364 of the top 500 singles wrestlers in the PWI 500 in 1995
