= WCPW Bare Knuckles Championship =

Professional wrestling championship

Details
- Promotion: Windy City Pro Wrestling
- Date established: May 22, 1999
- Date retired: May 17, 2008
Statistics
- First champion: Turbo
- Final champions: Austin Roberts (won May 17, 2008)
- Most reigns: Vito Fontaine (2); DOC (2); Mike Anthony (2)
- Longest reign: Vito Fontaine (736 days)
- Shortest reign: Austin Roberts (<1 day)

The WCPW Bare Knuckles Championship (sometimes called the WCPW Brass Knuckles Championship) was a professional wrestling hardcore championship contested for in Windy City Pro Wrestling (WCPW). It was defended in the promotion from 1999 until 2008 when it was merged with the WCPW Heavyweight and League Championships to create a unified "WCPW World Heavyweight Championship".

The inaugural champion was Turbo, who won the title at the 11th annual Battle of the Belts supercard in Chicago, Illinois on May 22, 1999, to become the first WCPW Bare Knuckles Champion. Vito Fontaine, DOC, and Mike Anthony are tied for the record for most reigns, with two each. At 736 days, Fontaine's first reign is the longest in the title's history. Austin Roberts's only reign was the shortest in the history of the title. He defeated the last champion, Acid Jaz, on May 17, 2008, at Battle of the Belts 20 to unify the Bare Knuckles, Heavyweight and League titles. Overall, there have been 11 reigns shared between 14 wrestlers, with three vacancies, and 1 deactivation.

== Title history ==
Key

#	Order in reign history
Reign	The reign number for the specific set of wrestlers listed
Event	The event in which the title was won
—	Used for vacated reigns so as not to count it as an official reign
N/A	The information is not available or is unknown
+	Indicates the current reign is changing daily

=== Names ===
Name	Years
WCPW Bare Knuckles Championship	1999 – 2008

=== Reigns ===
#	Wrestlers	Reign	Date	Days held	Location	Event	Notes	Ref.
1	Turbo	1	May 22, 1999	48	Chicago, Illinois	Battle of the Belts 11 (1999)		
—	Vacated	—	July 9, 1999	—	N/A	Live event	The championship is vacated when Turbo fails to appear for a scheduled title defense and is stripped as champion. A championship tournament is subsequently held over the next three months concluding at the 2-day "War at the World" supercard.	
2	X-treme	1	October 10, 1999	208	Tinley Park, Illinois	War at the World, Day 2 (1999)		
3	Vito Fontaine	1	May 20, 2000	736	Hammond, Indiana	Battle of the Belts 12 (2000)		
4	Julian the Warlock	1	May 26, 2002	125	Crete, Illinois	A Day at the Races (2002)		
5	Vito Fontaine	2	September 28, 2002	147	Chicago, Illinois	Live event		
6	DOC	1	February 22, 2003	169	Chicago, Illinois	Live event		
7	Mike Anthony	1	August 10, 2003	125	Chicago, Illinois	Hot Summers Nights (2003)		
8	DOC	2	December 13, 2003	154	Chicago, Illinois	Seasons Beatings (2003)		
9	Ivan Manson	1	May 15, 2004	735	Cicero, Illinois	Battle of the Belts 16 (2004)		
10	Frankie Valiant	1	May 20, 2006	N/A	Cicero, Illinois	Battle of the Belts 18 (2006)		
—	Vacant	—	2007	—	N/A	N/A	The championship is vacated when Frankie Valiant leaves the promotion.	
11	Mitch Blake	1	May 12, 2007	N/A	Cicero, Illinois	Battle of the Belts 19 (2007)	This was an 8-man elimination match involving D.O.C., Rick Walsh, and Don Greed.	
12	Mike Anthony	2	2007	N/A	N/A	N/A		
13	Acid Jaz	1	March 8, 2008	70	Chicago, Illinois	Lee Sanders Memorial Tournament (2008)	Jaz won the title in the opening rounds of the Lee Sanders Memorial Tournament.	
14	Austin Roberts	1	May 17, 2008	0	Cicero, Illinois	Battle of the Belts 20 (2008)	This was a unification match also involving Sean Mulligan to unify the WCPW Bare Knuckles, Heavyweight, and League Championships into a unified WCPW World Heavyweight Championship.	
—	Deactivated	—	May 17, 2008	—	Cicero, Illinois	Battle of the Belts 20 (2008)	Unified with Austin Roberts' WCPW World Heavyweight Championship.	

== Combined reigns ==
<1	Indicates that the reign lasted less than one day.

Rank	Wrestler	No. of reigns	Combined days
1	Vito Fontaine	2	883
2	Ivan Manson	1	735
3	DOC	2	323
4	X-treme	1	208
5	Mike Anthony	2	125
6	Julian the Warlock	1	125
7	Acid Jaz	1	70
8	Turbo	1	48
9	Austin Roberts	1	<1
