= WCPW Lightweight Championship =

Professional wrestling championship

Details
- Promotion: Windy City Pro Wrestling
- Date established: April 12, 1991
- Date retired: December 16, 2010

Other name
- WCW Lightweight Championship
Statistics
- First champion: Mike Anthony
- Final champions: Mizfitt Manners (won October 2, 2010)
- Most reigns: V-Factor (2)
- Longest reign: Mike Anthony (755 days)
- Shortest reign: Evan Money (14 days)

The WCPW Lightweight Championship was a professional wrestling lightweight title in Windy City Pro Wrestling (WCPW). It was a secondary title for the promotion before the creation of the WCPW League Championship in 1993 and its incorporation into the then newly created weight-class division as a legitimate lightweight title (up to 210 lbs).

The inaugural champion was Mike Anthony, who defeated Trevor Blanchard in Chicago, Illinois on April 12, 1991 to become the first WCW Lightweight Champion. V-Factor holds the record for most reigns, with two. At 755 days, Anthony's first and only reign is the longest in the title's history. Evan Money's reign was the shortest in the history of the title as he lost it to The Mizfit a mere 14 days after having won the belt. Overall, there have been 25 reigns shared between 24 wrestlers, with four vacancies, and 1 deactivation.

== Title history ==
Key

#	Order in reign history
Reign	The reign number for the specific set of wrestlers listed
Event	The event in which the title was won
—	Used for vacated reigns so as not to count it as an official reign
N/A	The information is not available or is unknown
+	Indicates the current reign is changing daily

=== Names ===
Name	Years
WCW Lightweight Championship	1991 — 1996
WCPW Lightweight Championship	1997 — 2010

=== Reigns ===
#	Wrestlers	Reign	Date	Days held	Location	Event	Notes	Ref.
1	Mike Anthony	1	April 12, 1991	722	Chicago, Illinois	Live event	Anthony defeated Trevor Blanchard to become the first WCW Lightweight Champion; the match may have been repeated the following night in Hebron, Indiana.	
—	Vacated	—	April 3, 1993	—	Chicago, Illinois	Live event	The championship is vacated when Mike Anthony abandons the title to enter the middleweight division.	
2	Trevor Blanchard	1	April 3, 1992	414	Harvard, Illinois	Live event	Blanchard is awarded the championship.	
3	Christopher Daniels	1	May 22, 1993	532	Chicago, Illinois	Live event		
4	Steve Boz	1	November 5, 1994	350	Chicago, Illinois	Live event		
5	Brandon Bishop	1	October 21, 1995	459	Chicago, Illinois	Live event		
6	Chi Town T	1	January 22, 1997	94	Chicago, Illinois	Live event		
7	Terry Allen	1	April 26, 1997	515	Crete, Illinois	Live event		
8	Jason Reign	1	September 23, 1998	66	Chicago, Illinois	Live event		
9	Vic Capri	1	November 28, 1998	315	Chicago, Illinois	Live event		
10	Nick Brunswick	1	October 9, 1999	224	Tinley Park, Illinois	War at the World, Day 1 (1999)		
11	Mike Masters	1	May 20, 2000	371	Hammond, Indiana	Battle of the Belts 12 (2000)		
12	Robbie Dawber	1	May 26, 2001	274	Hammond, Indiana	Live event		
13	9-Mil	1	February 24, 2002	231	Merrionette Park, Illinois	Live event		
14	The Great Milenko	1	October 13, 2002	N/A	Merrionette Park, Illinois	Live event		
—	Vacated	—	2003	—	N/A	N/A	The championship is vacated when The Great Milenko is stripped of the title.	
15	Acid Jaz	1	May 17, 2003	N/A	Cicero, Illinois	Battle of the Belts 15 (2003)		
16	Justin Adams	1	2004	N/A	N/A	Live event		
17	Marshe Rockett	1	2005	N/A	N/A	Live event		
18	Isaias Velasquez	1	May 20, 2006	N/A	Cicero, Illinois	Battle of the Belts 18 (2006)	This was a Triple Threat match involving Petey Williams.	
—	Vacated	—	June 2007	—	N/A	N/A	The championship is vacated when Velasquez is suspended and subsequently stripped of the title.	
19	V-Factor	1	October 26, 2007	338	Chicago, Illinois	Monster Bash (2007)	V-Factor defeated TC Washington for the vacant championship.	
20	Bart Banggs	1	September 28, 2008	76	Chicago, Illinois	WCPW Studio Show		
21	Barry Ryte	1	December 13, 2008	245	Calumet City, Illinois	Live event		
22	V-Factor	2	August 15, 2009	189	Chicago, Illinois	Hot Summer Nights (2009)		
23	Buddy Roberts, Jr.	1	February 20, 2010	105	Chicago, Illinois	Live event	This was a gauntlet match also involving NBK, Tommy Eastgate, Evan Money, and D-Block.	
—	Vacated	—	June 5, 2010	—	Chicago, Illinois	Live event		
24	Evan Money	1	September 18, 2010	14	Chicago, Illinois	WCPW Studio Show	This was a three-way match involving Mizfitt Manners.	
25	Mizfitt Manners	1	October 2, 2010	75	Bridgeview, Illinois	Battle of the Belts 22 (2010)		
—	Deactivated	—	December 16, 2010	—	N/A	N/A	WCPW merged with Chicago Pro Wrestling Academy on December 16, 2010, to form Dynasty Sports Entertainment and Mizfitt Manners was the final champion in WCPW as a company.	

== List of combined reigns ==
<1	Indicates that the reign lasted less than one day.

Rank (Note: Each reign is ranked highest to lowest; reigns with the same number mean that they are tied for that certain rank.)	Wrestler	# of reigns	Combined days
1	Mike Anthony	1	722
2	Christopher Daniels	1	532
3	V-Factor	2	527
4	Terry Allen	1	515
5	Brandon Bishop	1	459
6	Trevor Blanchard	1	414
7	Mike Masters	1	371
8	Steve Boz	1	350
9	Vic Capri	1	315
10	Robbie Dawber	1	274
11	Barry Ryte	1	245
12	9-Mil	1	231
13	Nick Brunswick	1	224
14	Buddy Roberts, Jr.	1	105
15	Chi Town T	1	94
15	Bart Banggs	1	76
17	The Mizfit	1	75
18	Jason Reign	1	66
