= WCPW League Championship =

Professional wrestling championship

Details
- Promotion: Windy City Pro Wrestling
- Date established: May 22, 1993
- Date retired: December 16, 2010

Other name
- WCW League Championship
Statistics
- First champion: Mike Anthony
- Final champions: DTA (won September 18, 2010)
- Most reigns: Mike Anthony (3); Terry Allen (3); Steve Boz (3)
- Longest reign: Steve Boz (714 days)
- Shortest reign: Abaddon (<1 day)

The WCPW League Championship was a professional wrestling heavyweight championship in Windy City Pro Wrestling (WCPW). It replaced the WCPW Heavyweight Championship as the promotion's main singles title in 1993, following the creation of its weight-class division, and continued to be defended until 2008 when it was unified with the Heavyweight and Bare Knuckles Championships to create the "WCPW World Heavyweight Championship". The League Championship was brought back during the promotion's final year with the intention of it being defended against by wrestlers from other promotions. It remained active until December 16, 2010 when WCPW merged with Chicago Pro Wrestling Academy to form Dynasty Sports Entertainment.

The inaugural champion was Mike Anthony, who defeated Kevin Quinn in a tournament final on May 22, 1993 to become the first WCW League Champion. Anthony, Terry Allen, and Steve Boz are tied for the record for most reigns, with three each. At 714 days, Steve Boz's first reign is the longest in the title's history. Abaddon's only reign was the shortest in the history of the title winning a Fatal Four Way match involving Acid Jaz, Marshe Rockett, and Justin Adams only to lose it to Curse on the same night. Coincidentally, he defeated the last champion, Sean Mulligan, on May 17, 2008 at Battle of the Belts 20 to unify the Bare Knuckles, Heavyweight and League titles. Wrestling under the name "Austin Roberts", he was the promotion's heavyweight champion at the time. Overall, there have been 28 reigns shared between 17 wrestlers, with three vacancies, and 2 deactivations.

== Title history ==
Key

No.	Order in reign history
Reign	The reign number for the specific set of wrestlers listed
Event	The event in which the title was won
—	Used for vacated reigns so as not to count it as an official reign
N/A	The information is not available or is unknown

=== Names ===
Name	Years
WCW League Championship	1993 — 1996
WCPW League Championship	1997 — 2010

=== Reigns ===
No.	Champion	Reign	Date	Days held	Location	Event	Notes	Ref.
1	Mike Anthony	1	May 22, 1993	259	Chicago, Illinois	Live event	Anthony defeated Kevin Quinn in a tournament final to become the first WCW League Champion.	
2	Mike Samson	1	February 5, 1994	77	Chicago, Illinois	Live event		
3	Mike Anthony	2	April 23, 1994	301	Joliet, Illinois	Live event		
4	Danny Dominion	1	February 18, 1995	91	Chicago, Illinois	Live event		
5	Turbo	1	May 20, 1995	574	Hammond, Indiana	Live event		
6	Steve Boz	2	December 14, 1996	714	Hammond, Indiana	Live event		
7	Ripper Manson	1	November 28, 1998	175	Chicago, Illinois	Live event		
8	Greg Valentine	1	May 22, 1999	140	Cicero, Illinois	Live event		
9	Vic Capri	1	October 9, 1999	N/A	Tinley Park, Illinois	War at the World - Day 1		
—	Vacated	—	January 2000	—	N/A	N/A	The championship is vacated when Capri goes "on sabbatical" from The Outfit.	
10	Jayson Reign	1	January 29, 2000	120	Chicago, Illinois	Live event	Reign is awarded the vacant title.	
11	Christopher Daniels	1	May 20, 2000	8	Hammond, Indiana	Battle of the Belts 12		
12	Jayson Reign	2	May 28, 2000	34	Crete, Illinois	Live event		
13	Terry Allen	1	July 1, 2000	603	Sandwich, Illinois	Live event		
14	Baltazaar	1	February 24, 2002	20	Merrionette Park, Illinois	Live event		
15	Terry Allen	2	March 16, 2002	63	Chicago, Illinois	Lee Sanders Memorial Tournament		
16	Baltazaar	2	May 18, 2002	364	Cicero, Illinois	Battle of the Belts 14		
17	Robbie Dawber	1	May 17, 2003	91	Cicero, Illinois	Battle of the Belts 15		
18	Ivan Manson	1	August 16, 2003	91	Grayslake, Illinois	Grayslake Summerfest		
19	Steve Boz	2	November 15, 2003	28	Chicago, Illinois	Fallout		
20	Terry Allen	3	December 13, 2003	154	Chicago, Illinois	Season's Beatings		
21	Steve Boz	3	May 15, 2004	N/A	Cicero, Illinois	Battle of the Belts 16	This was a best 2 out of 3 falls match. As a result of the pre-match stipulations, Allen was forced to leave WCPW.	
22	Acid Jaz	1	2005	N/A	N/A	Live event		
23	Abaddon	1	June 24, 2006	<1	Midlothian, Illinois	Live event	This was a Fatal Four Way match also involving Marshe Rockett and Justin Adams.	
24	Curse	1	June 24, 2006	623	Midlothian, Illinois	Live event		
25	Sean Mulligan	1	March 8, 2008	70	Chicago, Illinois	Lee Sanders Memorial Tournament	Mulligan won the titles in the opening rounds of the Lee Sanders Memorial Tournament.	
26	Austin Roberts	2	May 17, 2008	0	Cicero, Illinois	Battle of the Belts 20	This was a unification match also involving Acid Jaz to unify the WCPW Bare Knuckles, Heavyweight, and League Championships into a unified WCPW World Heavyweight Championship.	
—	Deactivated	—	May 17, 2008	—	Cicero, Illinois	Battle of the Belts 20	Unified with Austin Roberts' WCPW World Heavyweight Championship.	
—	Vacated	—	April 16, 2010	—	Morton Grove, Illinois	St. Martha's Mayhem	The championship becomes vacant following an official announcement by WCPW owner Sam DeCero of its reactivation. The title is intended only to be defended against competitors from other wrestling promotions.	
27	Mike Anthony	3	May 9, 2010	132	Chicago, Illinois	Studio Show	Anthony won a "Gauntlet for the Gold" tournament to win the vacant championship.	
—	Vacated	—	September 18, 2010	—	Chicago, Illinois	Studio Show	The championship is vacated when WCPW "General Manager" Psycho strips all champions of their titles.	
28	DTA	1	September 18, 2010	89	Chicago, Illinois	Studio Show	DTA defeated Mike Anthony to win the vacant championship.	
—	Deactivated	—	December 16, 2010	—	N/A	N/A	WCPW merged with Chicago Pro Wrestling Academy on December 16, 2010, to form Dynasty Sports Entertainment and DTA was the final champion in WCPW as a company.	

== Combined reigns ==
<1	Indicates that the reign lasted less than one day.

Rank	Wrestler	No. of reigns	Combined days
1	Terry Allen	3	820
2	Steve Boz	3	742
3	Mike Anthony	3	692
4	Curse	1	623
5	Turbo	1	574
6	Baltazaar	2	384
7	Ripper Manson	1	175
8	Greg Valentine	1	140
9	Jayson Reign	2	154
10	Robbie Dawber	1	91
11	Danny Dominion	1	91
12	Ivan Manson	1	91
13	Mike Samson	1	77
14	Sean Mulligan	1	70
15	Christopher Daniels	1	8
16	Abbadon	2	<1
