= Super Maxx =

American professional wrestler and promoter

Personal information
- Born: Samuel DeCero; 1959 (age 66–67) Chicago, Illinois, U.S.

Professional wrestling career
- Ring name(s): Mad Maxx 2 Sam Darro; Sam DeCero; Super Maxx
- Billed height: 6 ft 5 in (1.96 m)
- Billed weight: 295 lb (134 kg)
- Trained by: Paul Christy; Randy Savage; Angelo Poffo
- Debut: 1981
- Retired: 1987

Samuel DeCero (born c. 1959) is a retired American professional wrestler, manager, trainer, and promoter, better known by his ring name, Super Maxx. He was one-half of the Maxx Brothers, also known as the Wild or World Warriors, with Mad Maxx who together competed in the American Wrestling Association and the World Wrestling Association, winning the WWA World Tag Team Championship in 1984. He and Mad Maxx also toured Japan several times during the mid-1980s and unsuccessfully challenged IWGP Tag Team Champions Tatsumi Fujinami & Kengo Kimura in 1986.

DeCero is also the founder of Windy City Wrestling based in Chicago, Illinois, one of the oldest independent promotions in the United States, and is responsible for training hundreds of wrestlers. One of his former students, Christopher Daniels, started his career in DeCero's promotion and later became an established star on the independent circuit, TNA and AEW.

== Early life ==
A native of Chicago, Illinois, Sam DeCero became interested in professional wrestling at an early age and remained a fan throughout his childhood. He often attended live wrestling events with his parents at the International Amphitheater, where he watched the Vachon Brothers (Mad Dog & Butcher Vachon), Hercules Cortez, The Crusher, Dick the Bruiser, and other stars of the era. He became interested in music as a teenager and played the kettle drum in his school marching band. At age 16, while still in high school, DeCero joined a heavy metal band. Though achieving some limited success, he eventually left the band after six years.

== Professional wrestling career ==
=== Early career ===
DeCero approached promoter Paul Krusky after attending a local wrestling show and asked about entering professional wrestling. He was initially turned away by Krusky who told the 22-year-old DeCero he was far too small to compete. DeCero began training and within three months, he had increased his weight from 165 to 200 lbs. greatly improving his overall muscle mass. He later described his diet and training regimen in a 1991 interview,

I was eating 10,000 calories a day. My diet was a shake in the morning with protein powder, two eggs, two bananas, and then I'd go out and have breakfast. Then I'd have a snack, then I'd have lunch, usually two Whoppers, two Big Macs, something like that. Then I'd have another snack in the afternoon. Then I'd go train. Then I'd have another protein shake. Then I'd come home and have dinner, which was usually a steak, five baked potatoes, a whole can of corn, or beans, or peas, or something like that. And I'd have a snack before bedtime, like a sundae or something. So I was really piling it in. I got up to 200 pounds, went back to see [Krusky], and he couldn't believe I was the same guy, because I wasn't that fat, I thought I was muscular. I was working out six days a week, real hard.

Krusky agreed to take him into the business and, after paying him a fee, DeCero was introduced to a facility in Louisville, Kentucky where he was trained by Paul Christy and Randy Savage, as well as his brother Lanny and father Angelo Poffo, for eight months before making his debut in 1981. Throughout his training, he drove 14 hours to and from Louisville each weekend, helped set up the ring and participated in wrestling matches for which he was paid $10. This story has always been subject to question, especially as DeCero's mom Kay would regale the Windy City roster with stories of how he would come home from training with Angelo Poffo at his home in Downers Grove and demonstrate some new hold or move he learned that night. From there, he spent his rookie year in Indianapolis for the World Wrestling Association as Slammin' Sammy Darro. One of his first matches was against one of his childhood heroes Dick the Bruiser.

=== The Maxx Brothers ===
While wrestling in the WWA, DeCero met his future tag team partner Mad Maxx and, changing his name to Super Maxx, they eventually began teaming together. After winning the WWA World Tag Team Championship from Dick the Bruiser & Jeff Van Kamp in 1984, they moved on to the American Wrestling Association where they became one of its top tag teams during the mid-1980s. Some of their highlight matches were against teams such as The Midnight Rockers (Marty Jannetty & Shawn Michaels) and AWA Tag Team Champions Curt Hennig & Scott Hall whom they faced in Hammond, Indiana on March 22, 1986. He and Mad Maxx also went on several tours of Japan where they earned as much as $3,000 a week and, while in World Japan Pro Wrestling, faced IWGP Tag Team Champions Tatsumi Fujinami & Kengo Kimura in a no disqualification match for the IWGP Tag Team Championship. DeCero praised the Japanese with minimal slurs and described his experiences overseas in an interview years later.

They train seven days a week out there [in Japan]. They use karate and everything in their matches. We went out there, and we wouldn't let them intimidate us. We just started banging heads, and we ended up having good wrestling matches, and they respected us. As soon as they started throwing chops in, or kicks or something, to our stomachs, we'd just label them right in the face. That would set them back. [Japanese fans] are rowdy, but they're afraid of Americans. We used to carry a whip, snap the whip and wrap it around their neck, so they'd panic, go nuts. And if they hit one of us, and one of the chaperones and one of the Japs saw that, they'd take him in the back and practically beat him to death for hitting us. They were real strict. It was really a unique culture. I really enjoyed it out there. It was clean, a lot cleaner than it is in this country. They mop the damn sidewalks in the morning. People are clean, restaurants were spotless. Man, you don't even see a crumb on the table. It makes it real pleasant to eat, and just to be there. It's real expensive, though.

Throughout his career, he wrestled many of the top stars in the Midwest and Central States territories including Bruiser Brody, Adrian Adonis, Dick Murdoch, Jesse Ventura, Mr. Saito and Nick Bockwinkel. Many of these wrestlers gained respect for DeCero, who frequently faced them in "stiff" matches, and has credited them for helping him during his early career.

=== Windy City Wrestling ===
During his wrestling career, DeCero also worked as a city construction worker in Chicago. While on the job in 1987, he fell off a truck and landed on a steel plate suffering a severe back injury. He underwent surgery which required an intervertebral disc to be removed and two spinal fusions. Although he would recover from his injuries, he was told by doctors that he would unable to return to wrestling. DeCero also required surgery to remove growths caused by steroid use. He decided to open his own promotion, Windy City Wrestling, and spent almost a year gathering the necessary capital from family and friends prior to its debut in 1988. Mike Gretchner was one of the biggest investors and later became the Windy City Wrestling's general manager. He also started a wrestling school, Windy City Professional Wrestling Academy, in South Side Chicago which trained hundreds of wrestlers during the next twenty years. In September 1988, the school was profiled by the Chicago Sun-Times as reporter Larry Weintraub took part in a 3-hour training session under Frank "The Tank" Melson, Tarzan and DeCero. DeCero later said that it was his intention to bring back the "blood-and-guts wrestling that people loved years ago in the (International) Amphitheatre" and to make Chicago the center of professional wrestling once more.

The promotion became very successful during the next two years bringing in a number of territory stars such as Mad Maxx, "Mr. Electricity" Steven Regal, Dennis Condrey, "Playboy" Buddy Rose, Terry "Bam Bam" Gordy, Bam Bam Bigelow and Bruiser Brody shortly before his death; it was also where The Texas Hangmen (Psycho & Killer) and manager Paul E. Dangerously started their early careers. Windy City Wrestling also ran a weekly half-hour television show on Sportsvision, produced and directed by DeCero, and aired in five markets within three years. In October 1990, DeCero appeared with head trainer Sonny Rogers and WCW Heavyweight Champion Hurricane Smith as guests on The Doug Buffone Show. The show was taped at Ditka's Restaurant in Merrillville, Indiana, and also featured former Chicago Bears lineman Revie Sorey. By 1991, DeCero had promoted over 80 shows and helped organize fundraisers for Toys for Tots, Muscular Dystrophy and the Maryville City for Youth. One of his benefit shows with the Chicago Coalition for the Homeless was held at the International Amphitheater and was attended by 4,000 fans. DeCero and the promotion would also organize fundraisers for local fraternal police orders, booster clubs, and high schools.

Much of DeCero's charity work, as well as the wrestling school, attracted considerable media attention from newspapers and magazines. Windy City Wrestling was, at one point, ranked the fifth largest promotion in the United States. With the end of the 1980s wrestling boom, DeCero was hopeful that his promotion would surpass the National Wrestling Alliance and the World Wrestling Federation. He cited both the general decline of the NWA and Hulk Hogan's departure from the WWF, as well as correctly predicting the close of Pacific Northwest Wrestling, as reasons for his promotion to become the top wrestling organization. It was also his opinion that fans had grown tired of sports entertainment and that Windy City Wrestling was one of the few, if not the only promotion, actively promoting traditional "family friendly" wrestling.

Although financial setbacks and the decline of the territory system eventually forced DeCero to keep the promotion based in the general Chicago area, it was the only Midwestern regional promotion to survive into the 1990s. He was also able to feature former WWF stars such as Brian Knobs, Bob Backlund, Greg Valentine and King Kong Bundy as well as younger Extreme Championship Wrestling wrestlers Rob Van Dam and Sabu. His wrestling school also remained one of the top facilities in the region and whose students included Baltazar, Steve Boz, Terry Allen, Vic Capri, Trevor Blanchard, Jayson Reign, Mike Anthony, Ace Steel, Sosay, Kevin Quinn and Christopher Daniels. DeCero has also helped train referee Terry Hopper, female wrestler Sandra D and midget wrestler Puppet the Psycho Dwarf. In 1998, he had 70 students enrolled in his school. Several of his students have appeared as preliminary wrestlers at WWF house shows and televised events in the area. Around this time, he started a sister wrestling promotion, Urban America Pro Wrestling, which ran events in Chicago's inner city neighborhoods and featured African-American and minority wrestlers.

=== Retirement ===
In May 2008, DeCero announced at a WCPW show that he would be turning over the promotion to Ripper Manson. It was also at this show that he inducted the Windy City Dream Team (Lance Allen and Eddie Strong), Kevin Quinn, Frank "The Tank" Melson, K.C. Knight and "Iron" Mike Samson into the WCPW 2008 Hall of Fame. Head trainer Sonny Rogers and WCPW alumni Trevor Blanchard, Lips Manson, Zebra Kid, and Christopher Daniels accompanied them to the ring. That same year, DeCero became involved in a kayfabe feud with new co-owner Billy Whack who promised to "contact everyone who DeCero may have ever crossed by non-payment, bad business deals or personal reasons" and "invited every wrestler in the Chicago wrestling scene to join him in doing the one thing that every person who has ever started a wrestling group in Chicago has always wanted to do - conquer Sam DeCero and his WCPW". Billy Whack had previously promoted Lunatic Wrestling Federation, formerly based in Mokena and Midlothian, Illinois, which had rivaled DeCero's organization in previous years. In December 2010, Windy City Pro Wrestling closed.

On the December 31, 2012 episode of WWE Raw, CM Punk and Paul Heyman cut a promo about Punk's injury where Punk brought out his "doctor," "Dr. Samuel DeCero."

== Championships and accomplishments ==
- Polynesian Pacific Wrestling

- Polynesian Tag Team Championship (2 times) - with Mad Maxx

YouTube

A video amounting to over 3,000 views

- World Wrestling Association

- WWA World Tag Team Championship (1 time) - with Mad Maxx
