= Steve Regal =

American professional wrestler (1951–2025)

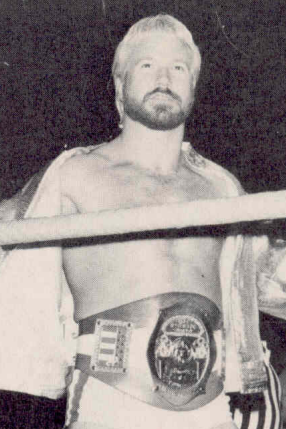
- Regal as the AWA World Light Heavyweight Champion, circa 1985

Personal information
- Born: Stephen Michael Regal; August 25, 1951 Fort Lauderdale, Florida, U.S.
- Died: July 30, 2025 (aged 73)
- Family: Wilbur Snyder (father-in-law)

Professional wrestling career
- Ring name: Steve Regal
- Billed height: 6 ft 1 in (185 cm)
- Billed weight: 220 lb (100 kg)
- Billed from: Indianapolis, Indiana
- Trained by: Rene Goulet; Wilbur Snyder
- Debut: August 29, 1975
- Retired: 1996

Stephen Michael Regal (August 25, 1951 – July 30, 2025), often billed as "Mr. Electricity" Steve Regal, was an American professional wrestler. He is best known for his appearances with the American Wrestling Association (AWA), where he won the AWA World Light Heavyweight Championship and AWA World Tag Team Championship with Jimmy Garvin.

Regal also wrestled for various National Wrestling Alliance (NWA) territories and other promotions, including Pacific Northwest Wrestling (PNW), where he won both the NWA Pacific Northwest Heavyweight Championship and NWA Pacific Northwest Tag Team Championship with Matt Borne twice, Jim Crockett Promotions (JCP), where he won the NWA World Junior Heavyweight Championship, and Windy City Pro Wrestling (WCPW), where he was the inaugural WCPW Heavyweight Champion.

== Professional wrestling career ==
=== Early career (1975–1983) ===
Regal's first known match was on August 29, 1975, against Mike Snyder. Early in his career, he wrestled for the Indianapolis-based World Wrestling Association (WWA), operated by Dick the Bruiser and Wilbur Snyder. Regal won his first professional wrestling championship with Héctor Guerrero in the Continental Wrestling Association (CWA) on November 19, 1979, defeating the Blond Bombers (Larry Latham and Wayne Farris) for the AWA Southern Tag Team Championship. They held the title until December 2, when they lost it to the Assassins (Jody Hamilton and Tom Renesto).

Regal also wrestled for Don Owen's Pacific Northwest Wrestling (PNW), teaming with Matt Borne on July 11, 1981, to win the NWA Pacific Northwest Tag Team Championship from Rip Oliver and The Destroyer. He won the vacant NWA Pacific Northwest Heavyweight Championship in a tournament final on August 15, becoming a double champion. They lost the tag title to Oliver and Buddy Rose on August 29, but regained it on September 5. In October, he lost and regained the Pacific Northwest Heavyweight Championship from Rose. After he and Borne lost the tag title to Rose and Stan Stasiak on November 4, Regal vacated the Pacific Northwest Heavyweight Championship in December due to injury. Also in July, Regal and Spike Huber were awarded the WWA World Tag Team Championship, which they lost to The New York Dolls (Rick McGraw and The Dream Machine) on September 25. They regained the titles in December and remained champions until June 1983.

=== American Wrestling Association (1976–1986) ===
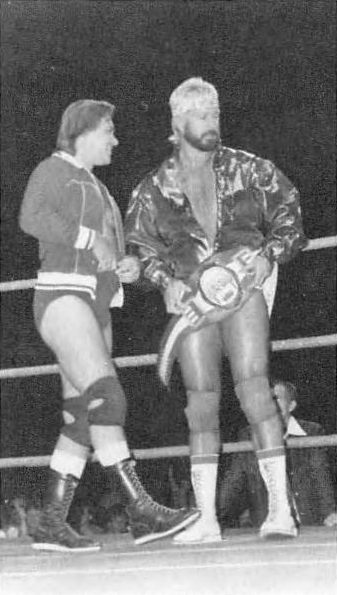
Regal (right) with Larry Zbyszko in 1984

Regal wrestled on-and-off for Verne Gagne's American Wrestling Association (AWA) starting in 1976, but was pushed when he returned full-time in 1980. He feuded with Buck Zumhofe, whom he lost to Super Sunday on April 24, 1983, but defeated to win the AWA World Light Heavyweight Championship on March 25, 1984. While champion, Regal appeared for the debut show of Pro Wrestling America (PWA) on January 15, 1985, where he was billed as the inaugural PWA Light Heavyweight Champion. He subsequently lost to Mad Dog Vachon in a match to determine the inaugural PWA Heavyweight Champion.

At SuperClash on September 28, Regal successfully defended the AWA World Light Heavyweight Championship against Brad Rheingans, after Fabulous Freebirds member Jimmy Garvin distracted Rheingans. The next night, Regal and Garvin defeated The Road Warriors (Hawk and Animal) to win the AWA World Tag Team Championship following interference from Freebirds member Michael Hayes. He lost the title back to Zumhofe on November 28. In early 1986, Regal left the AWA, and as a result, he and Garvin lost the AWA World Tag Team Championship to Curt Hennig and Scott Hall on January 18. During his tenure, he was a part of the AWA Remco Action Figure line.

=== All Japan Pro Wrestling (1982, 1985) ===
From July to August 1982, Regal wrestled for All Japan Pro Wrestling (AJPW) as part of the "Summer Action Series" tour, often teaming with Chavo Guerrero and Ultra Seven and facing the likes of Ashura Hara, Akio Sato, Atsushi Onita, Mighty Inoue and Mitsuharu Misawa. He returned during the "AJPW 85 Heat Wave! Summer Action Wars" tour in June 1985, most notably challenging Kuniaki Kobayashi for the NWA International Junior Heavyweight Championship in a losing effort on July 8. He also teamed with the likes of Harley Race, Stan Hansen and The Destroyer in a feud with Ishin Gundan (Killer Khan, Riki Choshu and Yoshiaki Yatsu).

=== World Class Championship Wrestling (1986) ===
Regal briefly appeared for World Class Championship Wrestling (WCCW) in 1986, unsuccessfully challenging Brian Adias for the WCWA Texas Tag Team Championship on May 4 at the 3rd Von Erich Memorial Parade of Champions.

=== Jim Crockett Promotions (1986) ===
Shortly afterwards, Regal made his debut for Jim Crockett Promotions (JCP) on May 17, 1986, where he fought NWA World Junior Heavyweight Champion Denny Brown to a 20-minute time limit draw. After a title match during the Great American Bash house show tour on July 5 ended in a draw, he defeated Brown to win the title on August 2, losing it back to him on September 1. Regal faced Héctor Guerrero in his final match for JCP three days later.

=== World Wrestling Federation (1986) ===
Regal made his first appearance in the World Wrestling Federation (WWF) on September 16, 1986, teaming with Terry Gibbs against George Steele and Junkyard Dog in a match that would be televised on the October 11 edition of WWF Superstars of Wrestling. As the WWF favored larger wrestlers at the time, Regal, retaining his "Mr. Electricity" nickname, was used exclusively as a jobber and did not receive promotional vignettes. His WWF run lasted under a month, with his final match being a loss to Tito Santana and Pedro Morales at a WWF Wrestling Challenge taping on October 29. According to Regal, he left the WWF due to the rigorous travel schedule, to be at home with his family and preserve his health.

=== Later career (1988–1996) ===
Regal returned to the NWA on March 20, 1988, defeating Spike Huber in his first match since leaving the WWF. Shortly afterwards, he joined the startup Windy City Pro Wrestling (WCPW) promotion, being crowned as the inaugural WCPW Heavyweight Champion on April 3. He successfully defended the title against the likes of Colonel DeBeers, Jim Brunzell and Ken Patera, before losing it on December 23, 1989, to Frank Melson, ending his reign at 619 days. He continued to wrestle sporadically for WCPW through 1995 before retiring the following year.

== Personal life and death ==
Stephen Michael Regal was born on August 25, 1951, in Fort Lauderdale, Florida. He was the son-in-law of wrestler Wilbur Snyder, having married his daughter Cindy, whom he met at Pike High School.

Regal died on July 30, 2025, at the age of 73. His death was not announced until December of that year. He had been suffering from heart issues, including aortic stenosis, at the time of his death.

== Championships and accomplishments ==
- American Wrestling Association
  - AWA World Light Heavyweight Championship (1 time)
  - AWA World Tag Team Championship (1 time) – with Jimmy Garvin
- Central States Wrestling
  - NWA Central States Tag Team Championship (2 times) – with Dewey Robertson
- Continental Wrestling Association
  - AWA Southern Tag Team Championship (1 time) – with Hector Guerrero
- Mid-Atlantic Championship Wrestling
  - NWA World Junior Heavyweight Championship (1 time)
- Pacific Northwest Wrestling
  - NWA Pacific Northwest Heavyweight Championship (2 times)
  - NWA Pacific Northwest Tag Team Championship (2 times) – with Matt Borne
- Pro Wrestling America
  - PWA Light Heavyweight Championship (1 time)
- World Wrestling Association (Indianapolis)
  - WWA World Tag Team Championship (2 times) – with Spike Huber
- Windy City Pro Wrestling
  - WCPW Heavyweight Championship (1 time)
