= Christopher Daniels =

American professional wrestler (born 1970)

- Daniels in August 2026
- Born: Christopher Daniel Covell; March 24, 1970 (age 56); Kalamazoo, Michigan, U.S.
- Education: Methodist College
- Employer: All Elite Wrestling
- Title: Head of Talent Relations
- Spouse: Lisa Covell (m. 1994)
- Children: 2
- Professional wrestling career
- Ring name(s): Chris Daniels; Christopher Daniels; Conquistador Dos; Curry Man; Daniels; Suicide; The Fallen Angel
- Billed height: 5 ft 11 in (1.80 m)
- Billed weight: 209 lb (95 kg); 232 lb (105 kg) as Curry Man
- Billed from: "The City of Angels"; USA (as Curry Man); Los Angeles, California (TNA) "Parts Unknown" (as Suicide) "Sin City"; Tokyo, Japan (as Curry Man) "Beautiful" Southern California
- Trained by: Sam DeCero; Windy City Pro Wrestling; Hunter Haas; Kevin Quinn; Inoki Dojo
- Debut: April 1993
- Retired: January 18, 2025

Christopher Daniel Covell (born March 24, 1970), better known by the ring name Christopher Daniels, is an American retired professional wrestler. He is signed to All Elite Wrestling (AEW), where he works as the Head of Talent Relations and is the on-screen manager of SkyFlight (Scorpio Sky, Dante Martin, Darius Martin, Leila Grey, Zayda Steel, and Matt Sydal). He is best known for his time in Total Nonstop Action Wrestling (TNA) and Ring of Honor (ROH), as well as extensive time on the independent circuit; he is known as the "King of Indies" for his work with independent promotions across the world, including Frontier Wrestling Alliance (FWA), International Wrestling Cartel (IWC), and Pro Wrestling Guerrilla (PWG).

Daniels has won 20 total championships between Impact, ROH, and New Japan Pro-Wrestling (NJPW), with three reigns as Impact X Division Champion, six reigns as NWA World Tag Team Champion, and two reigns as Impact World Tag Team Champion during his time with Impact Wrestling; one reign as ROH World Champion, one reign as ROH World Television Champion, four reigns as ROH World Tag Team Champion, and one reign as ROH World Six-Man Tag Team Champion while wrestling for ROH; and one reign as IWGP Junior Heavyweight Tag Team Champion in NJPW.

Daniels retired from in-ring competition in January 2025.

== Early life ==
Christopher Daniel Covell was born in Kalamazoo, Michigan, on March 24, 1970. When Covell was three, his family relocated to Fayetteville, North Carolina, where he became an avid fan of Mid-Atlantic Championship Wrestling. After he graduated from Methodist College with a degree in theater, Covell and his wife moved to Chicago, Illinois, where he planned to become an actor.

== Professional wrestling career ==
=== Early career (1993–2002) ===
After being trained by Sam DeCero, Mike Anthony and Kevin Quinn, Daniels made his debut for Windy City Pro Wrestling in April 1993, losing a tag match with Titan to The Manson Brothers (Ripper and Skull). The following month he defeated Trevor Blanchard for the WCPW Light Heavyweight Championship, and shortly thereafter won the WCPW Tag Team Championship with Kevin Quinn. Daniels subsequently traveled to Puerto Rico to wrestle for the World Wrestling Council, and on October 22, 1995, teamed with Kevin Quinn (as the team of Overkill) to defeat Huracán Castillo Jr. and Invader I for the WWC World Tag Team Championship. They lost the titles a month later to the Canadian Glamour Boys (Val Venis and Shane Sewell). Back in Windy City, Daniels defeated Bret Sanders for the WCPW Middleweight Championship, losing it to Brandon Bishop 17 days later. Around this time, he also wrestled for the Empire Wrestling Federation, where he won the EWF Heavyweight Championship.

Daniels teamed with Kevin Quinn to defeat Danny Dominion and Ace Steel at the NWA's 50th Anniversary show in October 1998 to become the first NWA Midwest Tag Team Champions. He participated in the 3rd Annual ECWA Super 8 Tournament, reaching the finals where he lost to Steve Bradley.

After a short stint in Extreme Championship Wrestling, Daniels traveled to Japan to wrestle for Michinoku Pro Wrestling, where he developed his masked persona, Curry Man, and competed in the Masked Man League, finishing third. On December 19, 1999, he defeated Minoru Fujita for the British Commonwealth Junior Heavyweight Championship.

Back in the United States, Daniels defeated Michael Modest for the APW Worldwide Internet Championship in All Pro Wrestling and won the 4th Annual ECWA Super 8 Tournament. He then won APW's King of the Indies tournament, the WCPW League Championship, and the UPW Heavyweight Championship.

=== World Wrestling Federation (1998–2001) ===
In 1998, Daniels signed a developmental deal with the World Wrestling Federation and trained at Dory Funk Jr.'s Funkin' Dojo. He made his WWF debut on January 19, 1998, losing a dark match to Mick Tierney, and went on to be used as a jobber on the WWF's B-shows, Sunday Night Heat and WWF Shotgun Saturday Night, throughout the late 1990s and early 2000s.

In 2000, he donned a mask and teamed (as Dos) with Aaron Aguilera (Uno) as Los Conquistadores, as part of The Hardy Boyz' feud with Edge and Christian. He also appeared as one of the Los Conquistadores alongside Aaron Aguilera where they competed in the APA's bar room brawl at the WWE Vengeance pay-per-view event in 2003.

He made several appearances on WWF Jakked during the spring of 2001, including a singles loss to Jerry Lynn and a tag team loss to Kaientai with Scoot Andrews as his partner.

=== World Championship Wrestling (2000–2001) ===
On January 14, 2000, Daniels received a tryout match with World Championship Wrestling, defeating Mikey Henderson. The original idea was for Daniels to portray Vampiro's dark master, Syndrome, but his WCW debut was continually postponed, and he eventually returned to the independent scene.

On the June 17, 2000, episode of WCW WorldWide, Daniels lost to Chris Candido and on the October 21 episode of WorldWide, Daniels lost to Kwee Wee. On the January 22, 2001, episode of WCW Monday Nitro, Daniels wrestled Michael Modest. During the match, he attempted a springboard moonsault, but his left foot missed the ring rope. Unable to sufficiently push off to complete the rotation, he botched the move and landed on his head, damaging his neck. Though he was able to finish the match, his left arm was impaired throughout it. Afterwards, Daniels and Modest signed 90-day contracts, but Daniels was released before he had another match.

=== Ring of Honor (2002–2004, 2005–2007) ===
==== The Prophecy (2002–2004) ====
On February 23, 2002, Daniels wrestled in the triple threat main event of Ring of Honor's first show, The Era of Honor Begins, against Low Ki and Bryan Danielson. He lost the match, then refused to shake hands with his opponents, breaking ROH's "Code of Honor", which mandated that all wrestlers shake hands before and after a match. He then took the mic and challenged Low Ki and Danielson to a round robin tournament at ROH's second show, Round Robin Challenge. Daniels defeated Danielson in the first match, then forced him to shake his hand. He next submitted to Low Ki's Dragon Clutch, but again refused to shake hands and said he would have won if he had not already wrestled that night, vowing to not wrestle Low Ki again unless the ROH World Championship was on the line.

At Ring of Honor's third show, A Night of Appreciation, Daniels lost to Donovan Morgan, with both men showing mutual respect. The two men formed a partnership, eventually adding other members and growing into the stable known as The Prophecy. Daniels defeated AJ Styles on June 22, to qualify for the first ROH World Championship match, a one-hour Iron Man match against Spanky, Doug Williams, and Low Ki. In this title match, Daniels scored a pin on the eventual winner, Low Ki, and was the only wrestler not to lose a fall by pin or submission.

Two months later, Low Ki defended the title against Xavier. During the match, Daniels came to the ring to distract Low Ki, allowing Xavier to attack the champion with a chair and pin him for the title. Xavier was subsequently announced as the newest member of The Prophecy. Later that night, Daniels and Morgan defeated Danielson and Michael Modest to become the inaugural ROH Tag Team Champions, giving The Prophecy possession of all championships in Ring of Honor.

At Glory By Honor, Daniels defeated Doug Williams, who was consequently banned from shaking hands in ROH. The Prophecy recruited the debuting Samoa Joe to take out Low Ki in the first ever Fight Without Honor, a match that does not follow ROH's Code of Honor rules. Low Ki won the match and shook Joe's hand.

On March 13, 2003, A.J. Styles and Amazing Red defeated Daniels and Xavier (substituting for Morgan) for the ROH Tag Team Championship. At the next show, The Prophecy also lost the ROH Championship, when former member Samoa Joe defeated Xavier. On April 26, Daniels won the second Round Robin Challenge by defeating Amazing Red and Paul London in singles matches. On June 14, The Prophecy put their existence in ROH on the line in a six-man tag team match against The Group (Samoa Joe, C. W. Anderson, and Michael Shane). The Prophecy won, and The Group was forced to disband. Daniels defeated the returning Xavier on August 16 to become number one contender for the ROH World Championship, only to be defeated by champion Samoa Joe on September 20.

After CM Punk declined an offer to join The Prophecy, someone assaulted his girlfriend Lucy backstage, forcing her out of ROH. On December 23, 2003, Daniels revealed that B. J. Whitmer, the newest member of The Prophecy, had attacked Lucy, starting a rivalry between The Prophecy and Punk's stable, The Second City Saints. On January 10, 2004, at Battle Lines are Drawn, The Prophecy (Daniels, Whitmer, and Dan Maff) faced The Second City Saints (Punk, Colt Cabana, and Ace Steel) in a six-man tag team main event. The Prophecy was disqualified when Whitmer accidentally hit the referee with a chair. After the match, Punk dropped Daniels from the ropes through a table with the Pepsi Plunge, putting him out of ROH.

In reality, Daniels' exit was a result of Total Nonstop Action Wrestling (TNA) not allowing their contracted wrestlers to work ROH shows, in light of a scandal surrounding ROH promoter Rob Feinstein.

==== Return to ROH (2005–2007) ====
Daniels at an event in Quincy, Massachusetts, in 2005

In the summer of 2005, Ring of Honor announced that, after a sixteen-month absence, Daniels would return on July 8. However, on June 18, at Death Before Dishonor III, he made a surprise early return, confronting and challenging the new ROH World Champion, CM Punk, who had threatened to leave for World Wrestling Entertainment with the title. Punk refused the challenge and fled the arena. At the next show, Sign of Dishonor, Daniels defeated Punk's stablemate, Colt Cabana, when Punk attempted to hit Daniels with a steel chain, but instead hit Cabana. At Fate of an Angel, Daniels lost to the debuting Matt Hardy after Punk interfered. Later that night, after Punk's successful defense against James Gibson, Daniels stole the belt and was granted a title shot.

On July 23, at The Homecoming, Daniels wrestled Punk to a one-hour time limit draw; the time expired just as Daniels hit his Angel's Wings finisher. At the next show on August 12, Redemption, Daniels, Gibson and Samoa Joe challenged CM Punk for the title in a Four-Way Elimination match. While Joe had Daniels in a submission move, Daniels put his foot on the rope to force a break. Punk knocked it off before the referee noticed, and Daniels submitted. Daniels tried to get revenge, but inadvertently helped Punk eliminate Joe.

Daniels remained a regular member of the ROH roster, while also working other promotions. He made his U.S. debut as Curry Man on August 27, against Shingo Takagi at Dragon Gate Invasion

After defeating Matt Sydal in two singles matches and losing to him in a third, they became tag team partners in the summer of 2006. On August 26, they failed in their first shot at the ROH World Tag Team Championship, against Austin Aries and Roderick Strong. On November 25, they defeated Chris Hero and Claudio Castagnoli for the title, making Daniels a two-time champion. After defending against CIMA and Shingo, Austin Aries and Roderick Strong and Jack Evans and Shingo, Daniels and Sydal lost the title to the Briscoe Brothers on February 24, 2007.

At Good Times, Great Memories on April 28, Daniels wrestled a fifteen-minute time-limit draw with Erick Stevens. Following the match, Daniels turned heel and quit ROH.

=== Total Nonstop Action Wrestling (2002–2010) ===
==== Triple X (2002–2004) ====
Daniels joined the newly founded Total Nonstop Action Wrestling (TNA) promotion in 2002. He debuted for TNA at a weekly pay-per-view event on July 10, where he participated in a six-way elimination match to determine the #1 contender for the TNA X Division Championship, where he was the runner-up, being eliminated by Low Ki. The following week, on July 17, Daniels teamed with Elix Skipper for the first time in a losing effort against the Flying Elvises (Jorge Estrada and Sonny Siaki). After a long hiatus, Daniels returned to TNA on December 18 and joined Vince Russo's Sports Entertainment Xtreme stable, along with Low Ki and Elix Skipper by attacking Curt Hennig. Later in the night, the trio defeated Amazing Red and The S.A.T. in a six-man tag team match. On January 8, the trio of Daniels, Ki and Skipper was named Triple X as all three members competed against Jeff Jarrett for the NWA World Heavyweight Championship in a gauntlet match but failed to win. On January 22, Ki and Skipper defeated America's Most Wanted (Chris Harris and James Storm) to win the NWA World Tag Team Championship. Daniels was recognized as the champion as well with any two of the three members defending the tag team titles via the Triple X Rule. The titles were vacated via a double pin against The Harris Brothers on February 5. On March 12, Daniels and Low Ki defeated America's Most Wanted to win the vacant NWA World Tag Team Championship, beginning the trio's second reign with the tag team titles.

On April 16, Daniels and Skipper lost the titles to Jerry Lynn and Amazing Red. On April 23, Triple X defeated America's Most Wanted to earn a rematch for the tag team titles. However, Daniels lost a match to Lynn on April 30 and as per pre-match stipulation, Lynn and Red would have to defend the titles against one member of Triple X of their choosing and Daniels was chosen. The subsequent handicap match took place on May 7, where Daniels defeated Lynn and Red via disqualification to win Triple X's third NWA World Tag Team Championship and becoming the first person to win the NWA World Tag Team Championship individually. Shortly after, Low Ki left TNA while Daniels and Skipper continued to team as Triple X and defend the tag team titles until losing them to America's Most Wanted in a steel cage match on June 25. Following the title loss, Triple X disbanded as both men went their separate ways.

Daniels briefly feuded with Jeff Jarrett in the summer of 2003. He then regularly wrestled in the X Division and pursued the X Division Championship before briefly reuniting Triple X with the returning Low Ki in March 2004 as they participated in a tournament for the vacant NWA World Tag Team Championship by defeating The New Franchise (Michael Shane and Shane Douglas) and The Naturals (Andy Douglas and Chase Stevens) before losing to Kid Kash and Dallas in the tournament final. Ki left TNA shortly after. On April 21, Daniels defeated Michael Shane to qualify for Team USA for the 2004 World X Cup, where Daniels was reunited with his Triple X teammate Elix Skipper as they defeated Team Canada members Bobby Roode and Johnny Devine. After the World X Cup, Daniels reunited Triple X with Skipper and they participated in a Best of Three Series against America's Most Wanted with the winning team earning the #1 contendership for the NWA World Tag Team Championship. After both teams won the first and second matches respectively, the third match ended in a no contest after interference by The Naturals. A rematch between both teams on the August 27 episode of Impact! would turn into a singles match between Daniels and Harris after Storm suffered an injury. The match ended in a ten-minute time limit draw, resulting in AMW and Triple X both unsuccessfully challenging Naturals for the tag team titles in a three-way on September 1.

On September 8, Harris and Skipper won the tag team titles after both Daniels and Storm were injured by The Naturals. On the September 24 episode of Impact!, Daniels and Storm defeated Harris and Skipper to win the NWA World Tag Team Championship, marking Daniels' fourth reign. They lost the titles to Team Canada's Bobby Roode and Eric Young on the October 15 episode of Impact!. Triple X would resume their feud with America's Most Wanted after the title loss, which led to a last man standing match between the two teams at TNA's first-ever monthly pay-per-view Victory Road on November 7, which Triple X lost. The following month, at Turning Point, Triple X lost to AMW in a Six Sides of Steel match, which forced Triple X to disband.

==== X Division Champion (2005–2007) ====
On the January 14, 2005, episode of Impact!, Daniels lost to Chris Sabin in a qualifier for the Ultimate X match at Final Resolution. However, Daniels competed at the event as he teamed with Michael Shane and Kazarian against 3Live Kru in a losing effort. On the January 21 episode of Impact!, Daniels lasted ten minutes with A.J. Styles, thus earning a title shot against Styles for the TNA X Division Championship at Against All Odds, where Daniels failed to win the title. This marked the beginning of a lengthy feud between Daniels and Styles over the X Division Championship. On the March 11 episode of Impact!, Daniels defeated Chris Sabin to qualify for the Ultimate X Challenge at Destination X against Styles, Ron Killings and Elix Skipper. The match ended in a screwjob. Styles had retrieved the belt, but the referee was unconscious. Daniels hit Styles with an Angel's Wings and took the belt when the ref woke, thus winning his first X Division Championship. Daniels successfully defended the title against Skipper in a Six Sides of Steel match at Lockdown. Daniels successfully defended the title against Shocker at Hard Justice, Chris Sabin and Michael Shane in a three-way match at Slammiversary and Petey Williams at No Surrender. After defeating Austin Aries in a non-title match at Sacrifice, Daniels lost the title to Styles in a three-way dance also involving Samoa Joe at Unbreakable on September 11 when Styles reversed an Angel's Wings attempt into a pin. This match received a 5-star rating from Dave Meltzer. Daniels set the record for the longest reign at the time, ending at 150 days. Daniels unsuccessfully challenged Styles for the title in an Iron Man match at Bound for Glory.

Daniels performing a diving crossbody in January 2007

On November 13 at Genesis, Daniels teamed with Alex Shelley, Roderick Strong and Samoa Joe to defeat Austin Aries, Chris Sabin, Matt Bentley and Sonjay Dutt in an Elimination X match. After the match, Joe attacked Daniels and hit him with a Muscle Buster onto a chair, leading to Daniels sustaining a (storyline) concussion. At Turning Point, when Joe tried to similarly injure A.J. Styles after winning the X Division Championship from him, Daniels returned and attacked Joe, enabling security guards to protect Styles and restrain Joe. At Final Resolution, Daniels challenged Joe for the title but lost when Styles threw in the towel to protect Daniels, badly beaten and defenseless, from further damage. The next week, Daniels accused Styles of doing this to get the number one contendership for the X Division Championship. That night, he cost Styles a match against Shannon Moore by throwing in the towel. At Against All Odds, Joe retained the title in a three-way match against Daniels and Styles. The following month, at Destination X, Daniels defeated Joe and Styles in an Ultimate X match to win his second X Division Championship, before losing the title to Joe on the April 13 episode of Impact! after taking a second rope Island Driver.

Daniels was then scheduled to face Jushin Thunder Liger in a cage match at Lockdown, but Liger pulled out of the match. Instead, he faced a mystery opponent, who turned out to be the returning Low Ki (now named Senshi), who defeated him. Daniels turned face by teaming with A.J. Styles and becoming the number one contender for the NWA World Tag Team Championship, held by America's Most Wanted. Daniels and Styles unsuccessfully challenged AMW for the titles at Sacrifice, before beating them in a rematch at Slammiversary, marking Daniels' fifth reign with the title. At Victory Road, Daniels and Styles teamed with Sirelda to defeat Gail Kim and AMW in a six-person mixed tag team match to retain the titles. They then feuded with The Latin American Xchange (Homicide and Hernandez). At Hard Justice, Styles and Daniels successfully defended the titles against LAX. However, on the August 24 episode of Impact!, Styles and Daniels lost the titles to LAX in a Border Brawl. At No Surrender, Styles and Daniels defeated LAX in an Ultimate X match to win their second NWA World Tag Team Championship as a team and marked Daniels' sixth individual reign. At Bound for Glory, Styles and Daniels lost the titles to LAX in a Six Sides of Steel match to end the rivalry.

On November 16, Daniels defeated Styles and Chris Sabin in a three-way match on the primetime debut of Impact! on Spike TV, by pinning Sabin, to win his third TNA X Division Championship. Daniels successfully defended the title against Sabin at Genesis and Turning Point before losing the title to Sabin in a three-way match at Final Resolution on January 14, 2007, also involving Jerry Lynn. Daniels then took time off from TNA. He made his return, as a heel, at Destination X, distracting Lynn during his match with Sabin. After the match, the newly bearded Daniels, sporting tribal-styled paint on one side of his face, hit Sabin with the Angel's Wings and Lynn with the X Division title belt. At Lockdown, Daniels pinned Jerry Lynn in a cage match. At Sacrifice, Daniels pinned Rhino after hitting him with a baseball bat.

==== Triple X reunion (2007) ====
Daniels at a Pro Wrestling Guerrilla event in 2007

Daniels began feuded with Sting, costing him a King of the Mountain match qualifier by hitting him with a baseball bat. Sting attacked him the next week on Impact!. On June 17 at Slammiversary, Sting pinned him after the Scorpion Death Drop. According to Daniels, the feud ended before the start because Vince Russo did not know what to do with his Fallen Angel gimmick.

At Victory Road, Daniels won a ten-man Ultimate X Gauntlet match with the assistance of Senshi and Elix Skipper, thus reuniting Triple X in the process. At Hard Justice, Daniels and Senshi competed against Jay Lethal and Sonjay Dutt and Motor City Machine Guns (Alex Shelley and Chris Sabin) in a three-way dance which Lethal and Dutt won. At No Surrender, Daniels and Senshi participated in a gauntlet match for a future TNA World Tag Team Championship opportunity but failed to win. At Bound for Glory on October 14, Daniels unsuccessfully challenged for Jay Lethal for the X Division Championship. At Turning Point, Daniels participated in the inaugural Feast or Fired but failed to win any briefcase. On the December 6 episode of Impact!, Daniels beat Senshi in a match for his "Feast or Fired" briefcase, refereed by Elix Skipper. The next week, the briefcase was revealed to contain a pink slip, meaning Daniels was fired from TNA.

==== Curry Man (2008) ====
Daniels in May 2008, playing the "Curry Man" character

One month after Daniels was fired, Covell returned to TNA as the colourful, masked Curry Man, who soon became allied with Shark Boy. Unlike the brooding serious nature of his "Fallen Angel" persona, Curry Man was a dancing, cartoonish comedy act. He and Shark Boy feuded with Team 3D, and won a "Fish Market Street Fight" against them at Destination X. On the March 13, 2008 Impact!, Curry Man beat Petey Williams to qualify for the Xscape match for the X Division Title at Lockdown, along with Jay Lethal, Sonjay Dutt, Shark Boy, Consequences Creed, and Johnny Devine. He eliminated Creed from the match after hitting his Spice Rack finisher, and was eliminated by Devine after the Devine Intervention.

In June, Curry Man represented Team TNA in the 2008 World X Cup. After losing to Team International's Alex Koslov in a preview match, he lost to Team Japan's Milano Collection A.T. in the tournament. At Victory Road, Curry Man wrestled in a four-team, twelve-man elimination tag match; he was eliminated by Team Mexico's Último Guerrero.

Curry Man and Shark Boy then allied with Super Eric to form a comedic superhero-themed stable called The Prince Justice Brotherhood. At No Surrender, The Prince Justice Brotherhood defeated The Rock 'n' Rave Infection (Christy Hemme, Jimmy Rave and Lance Rock) in a Six-person intergender tag team match. At Bound for Glory IV, Curry Man competed in the Steel Asylum to determine the #1 contender to the TNA X Division Championship which was won by Jay Lethal.

At Final Resolution, Curry Man was one of the four participants in the "Feast or Fired" match (along with Jay Lethal, Homicide and Hernandez) to retrieve a briefcase. His contained a pink slip, meaning he was fired.

==== Various feuds (2009–2010) ====
Daniels (center) wrestling Shane Douglas at Slammiversary Seven in June 2009.

In early 2009, Covell began playing the role of the masked Suicide, while Frankie Kazarian (the original Suicide) recovered from injury. As Suicide, he won the X Division Championship in an Ultimate X match at Destination X.

Christopher Daniels returned to TNA television as a face, under his "Fallen Angel" gimmick (his name shortened to just Daniels afterwards) on the April 16 TNA Impact!. He defeated Kurt Angle to give Jeff Jarrett's team the first-man advantage in Lethal Lockdown, at Lockdown. He was then announced as a member of Team Jarrett. The win was overturned by Jeff Jarrett, after he noticed Angle's shoulder was up during the pinfall and Daniels' shoulders were down. At Lockdown, Team Jarrett defeated Team Angle.

Daniels then feuded with Alex Shelley and Chris Sabin (The Motor City Machine Guns), who, on the April 30 Impact!, accused him of being Suicide. On the May 7 Impact!, Jay Lethal and Consequences Creed echoed the accusations. On the May 14 Impact!, Daniels helped Suicide clear the ring of Shelley, Sabin, Lethal, and Creed after they attempted to unmask him. At Sacrifice, Daniels defeated Suicide to win the TNA X Division Championship. After the match, Daniels saw a replay of the finish, involving Alex Shelley's interference. He said he didn't want to win the belt like that and asked for five extra minutes. The five minutes expired in a draw, and Suicide kept the title.

At Slammiversary Seven, Daniels pinned Shane Douglas in a match with Daniels' job on the line, after hitting the Best Moonsault Ever.

At Victory Road, Wrestling Observer's Worst Show of the Year, Daniels lost to Matt Morgan.

At Hard Justice, Daniels won the Steel Asylum match to become the number one contender for the X Division Championship, reigniting his feud with champion Samoa Joe. Daniels lost to Joe at No Surrender, then lost a three-way match (also involving Homicide) to him on the following Impact.

At Bound for Glory, Daniels wrestled a six-man Ultimate X match for the X Division Championship, also featuring Alex Shelley, Chris Sabin, Suicide, Homicide and successfully defending champion, Amazing Red.

On the November 5 Impact!, Daniels confronted the TNA World Heavyweight Champion, A.J. Styles, and claiming he was just as good a wrestler as Styles, but was not given the same breaks by TNA, which he said was pampering, coddling and spoiling Styles. At Turning Point, Styles retained his title in a three-way match against Daniels and Samoa Joe by pinning Joe. On the November 19 Impact!, Daniels completed his heel turn and teamed with Desmond Wolfe against Styles and Kurt Angle, pinning Styles. At Final Resolution, Daniels unsuccessfully challenged Styles for the TNA World Heavyweight Championship.

Daniels in TNA in January 2010.

The following month at Genesis, Daniels lost to Sean Morley in Morley's TNA debut.

On the March 8 Impact!, Daniels vowed to re-ignite the flame of the X Division. That night, he was pinned by X Division Champion Doug Williams in a three-way title match, also involving Kazarian.

At Destination X, Daniels competed in a four-way ladder match for the number one contendership for the X Division title, and was defeated by Kazarian. Two days later, Daniels defeated Kazuchika Okada in a dark match at the Impact! taping.

Covell was released from his TNA contract on March 31, 2010, after nearly eight years with the company.

=== Ring of Honor (2010–2011) ===
Daniels returned to Ring of Honor on April 3, 2010, at its second live pay-per-view, ROH The Big Bang!, challenging Davey Richards to a match. On May 7, at Civil Warfare, Daniels defeated Kevin Steen in his return match and so took his #2 spot in the Pick 6 standings. The following day, at Supercard Of Honor V, Daniels defeated ROH World Television Champion and Richards' tag team partner, Eddie Edwards, in a non-title match. On May 21, Daniels participated in his first Ring of Honor Wrestling taping, teaming with Roderick Strong in a losing effort against The American Wolves (Davey Richards and Eddie Edwards).

On June 19, Daniels made his ROH pay-per-view wrestling debut at Death Before Dishonor VIII, successfully defending his #2 Pick 6 spot against Kenny Omega and rupturing an eardrum in the process. At the next PPV, Glory By Honor IX, Daniels defeated Austin Aries. On October 16, Daniels finally received his match with Davey Richards, but lost via submission. Three days later Ring of Honor announced that Daniels had officially signed a contract with the promotion. On November 13, Daniels received a shot at the ROH World Championship, but lost to the champion, Roderick Strong.

At the December 10 taping of Ring of Honor Wrestling in Louisville, Kentucky, Daniels beat Eddie Edwards for the ROH World Television Championship. Eight days later, at Final Battle 2010, Daniels lost to Homicide in a non–title number one contender's match. At the net pay-per-view, 9th Anniversary Show, on February 26, 2011, Daniels wrestled Eddie Edwards to a thirty-minute time limit draw in a Two Out of Three Falls rematch for the Television title. Afterwards, it was announced that Daniels would challenge for the ROH World Championship at the following pay-per-view on April 1. On March 18, Daniels successfully defended the Television title against Mike Bennett.

In preparation for his World Championship match against Roderick Strong, Daniels stole "The Book of Truth" from Strong's manager, Truth Martini, to learn his match strategy. He was forced to shift his focus when, on March 19, Strong lost the title to Eddie Edwards. On April 1, at Honor Takes Center Stage, Daniels unsuccessfully challenged Edwards for the World Championship, and afterwards teased a heel turn by refusing to shake his hand. The next day (the second of the Honor Takes Center Stage weekend), Daniels completed his heel turn by attacking El Generico with "The Book of Truth" and aligning himself with Truth Martini, Roderick Strong and Michael Elgin, a stable called The House of Truth.

On June 26, at Best in the World 2011, Daniels lost the Television title to El Generico. This was his last appearance in ROH before rejoining TNA full-time.

=== Chikara (2010) ===
Curry Man replaced the injured Cassandro to team with Los Ice Creams (El Hijo del Ice Cream and Ice Cream Jr.) in Chikara's 2010 King of Trios tournament, which started on April 23, 2010. The trio lost in the first round to Team Perros del Mal (El Alebrije, Cuije and El Oriental). The following day, Christopher Daniels defeated Hallowicked in a singles match. On the third night of the event, Daniels lost to Eddie Kingston.

=== Lucha Libre AAA World Wide (2010) ===
On April 30, 2010, Christopher Daniels debuted for the major Mexican promotion, Lucha Libre AAA World Wide, as a surprise member of the rudo La Legión Extranjera (Foreign Legion) stable. In a six-man tag match, he, Alex Koslov and Joe Líder defeated Extreme Tiger, Jack Evans and Rocky Romero when Daniels pinned the AAA Cruiserweight Champion, Extreme Tiger. On June 6, at Triplemanía XVIII, Daniels lost to Jack Evans in a four-way elimination match for the Cruiserweight Championship, along with Extreme Tiger and Nosawa.

=== Return to TNA (2011–2014) ===
==== Fortune (2011–2012) ====
Covell returned to TNA at the January 31, 2011, taping of Xplosion, as Suicide. Still contracted to Ring of Honor, he received the promotion's blessing for the return, provided he not work as Christopher Daniels until the contract expired. On February 10, Suicide returned to Impact!, losing a three–way X Division number one contender's tournament match, also involving Brian Kendrick, to Robbie E.

On March 16, at the tapings of the March 31 Impact!, Covell made his TNA return under the Christopher Daniels character, saving Fortune members James Storm, Kazarian and Robert Roode from a four–on–three beatdown inside a steel cage at the hands of Immortal, in the process establishing himself as a face. In his return Daniels targeted especially Bully Ray, who had sidelined Fortune leader A.J. Styles with an injury two weeks earlier. On the April 7 Impact!, Daniels proclaimed his loyalty to Styles and announced that he would be taking his place alongside Kazarian, Roode and Storm in the Lethal Lockdown match at Lockdown, where they will face Immortal representatives Abyss, Bully Ray, Matt Hardy and Ric Flair. Later that same evening Daniels wrestled his TNA return match, losing to Bully Ray in a Lumberjack match, where Fortune and Immortal worked as lumberjacks, after Immortal leader Hulk Hogan interfered and hit him with a chain. Despite his return as Daniels, Covell also kept performing as Suicide and on the same April 7 Impact!, teamed with Brian Kendrick and Chris Sabin in a six-man tag team match, where they defeated Generation Me and Robbie E. Soon after this Suicide's profile was removed from TNA's roster page. On April 17 at Lockdown, Daniels and Fortune defeated Immortal in a Lethal Lockdown match. On the next Impact!, Daniels was officially named a member of Fortune. On the May 26 Impact Wrestling, Daniels and Styles defeated Bully Ray and his new partner, Tommy Dreamer, in a No Disqualification Street Fight.

On July 10 at Destination X, TNA's first ever all X Division pay-per-view, Daniels faced fellow Fortune member A.J. Styles in the main event of the evening in a losing effort. During the event Daniels also made a brief appearance as Curry Man, in a segment where Eric Young was looking for a tag team partner to face Generation Me. After weeks of Daniels asking for a rematch, Styles finally granted him one on the September 1 Impact Wrestling, which Daniels won. After the match, Daniels refused to shake hands with Styles. On the September 22 episode, Daniels refused to return the favor and give Styles a rematch, which led to them brawling. When they were separated by Kazarian, Daniels kicked Styles in the groin, completing his heel turn and signifying his departure from Fortune. At Daniels' request, he faced Styles at Bound for Glory on October 16 in an "I Quit" match; Daniels lost the match after being threatened with a screwdriver, but continued the feud by attacking Styles after the match.

On the October 27 Impact Wrestling, Daniels lost to Rob Van Dam by disqualification after hitting him with a toolbox. On the November 10 Impact Wrestling, Daniels was defeated by A.J. Styles, after Van Dam prevented Daniels from using a screwdriver. On November 13 at Turning Point, Daniels lost to Van Dam in a No Disqualification match. In retaliation, Daniels interfered and cost Van Dam his match for the TNA Television Championship on the December 1 Impact Wrestling. This led to a singles match on December 11 at Final Resolution on December 11, where Van Dam was victorious.

==== Bad Influence (2012–2014) ====
Daniels (standing) applying a nerve hold to Magnus in January 2013

Daniels (left) and Kazarian in February 2013, dressed as William Wallace, mocking fans in Scotland.

Daniels then returned to his rivalry with A.J. Styles, managing to convince Kazarian to turn on him on the January 5, 2012 Impact Wrestling. On the February 9 Impact Wrestling, Daniels defeated Styles in a singles match with help from Kazarian, who was now showing signs that Daniels was holding something over his head and had forced him to turn on Styles against his will. On March 18 at Victory Road, Daniels and Kazarian were defeated in a tag team match by Styles and Mr. Anderson. The rivalry continued on April 15 at Lockdown, where the two duos were on opposing teams in the annual Lethal Lockdown match. Styles' and Anderson's team, led by Garett Bischoff, ended up defeating Daniels' and Kazarian's team, led by Eric Bischoff.

During Styles' absence from Impact Wrestling, Daniels and Kazarian set their sights on the TNA World Tag Team Championship, attacking champions Magnus and Samoa Joe on the April 26 episode. On the May 10 Impact Wrestling, Kazarian revealed that he originally aligned himself with Daniels to keep him from revealing Styles' secret, but changed his mind after learning what the secret was. Daniels then revealed the secret, a series of photographs insinuating a relationship between Styles and TNA president Dixie Carter. Three days later at Sacrifice, Daniels and Kazarian defeated Magnus and Samoa Joe to win the TNA World Tag Team Championship for the first time. Later in the event, Daniels and Kazarian cost A.J. Styles his match with Kurt Angle, who afterwards turned on the two, saving Styles from a beatdown. On May 31, Daniels main evented a live episode of Impact Wrestling, losing to A.J. Styles in a singles grudge match. After the match, Daniels and Kazarian attacked both Styles and Angle, who attempted to make the save, before rolling an audio of a phone conversation to prove an affair between Styles and Carter. The tape was abruptly cut short by Carter ending the show. On June 10 at Slammiversary, Daniels and Kazarian lost the TNA World Tag Team Championship to Styles and Angle. On the next Impact Wrestling, Daniels entered the 2012 Bound for Glory Series, taking part in the opening gauntlet match, from which he eliminated both Styles and Angle, before being eliminated himself by James Storm.

On the June 21 Impact Wrestling, Styles and Carter proved that Daniels and Kazarian had been lying about their relationship by producing a pregnant woman named Claire, whom they had been helping overcome her addictions. The following week, Kazarian teased dissension with Daniels, claiming that he had been lied to. However, in the main event of the evening, Kazarian revealed that he was still on Daniels' side, when the two defeated Styles and Angle, after Kazarian hit Styles with a steel chair, to regain the TNA World Tag Team Championship. Following the win, Daniels admitted that Styles and Carter had told the truth about Claire, but claimed that they had left out the part about Styles being the father of her unborn baby. On July 8 at Destination X, Daniels was defeated by Styles in a Last Man Standing match. On the August 8 Impact Wrestling, Daniels and Kazarian, billing themselves as "The World Tag Team Champions of the World", made their first televised defense of the TNA World Tag Team Championship, defeating Devon and Garett Bischoff. Daniels' participation in the 2012 Bound for Glory Series ended on the following Impact Wrestling with a loss against A.J. Styles, leaving him outside a spot in the semifinals. As a result of the win, Styles also earned a paternity test, which revealed that Claire was not pregnant at all. The storyline ended with Claire, through her attorney, revealing Daniels' and Kazarian's plot to blackmail Styles with her fake pregnancy. On September 6 as part of the first "Championship Thursday", Daniels and Kazarian successfully defended the TNA World Tag Team Championship against Chavo Guerrero Jr. and Hernandez. Three days later at No Surrender, Daniels and Kazarian made another successful title defense against previous champions, A.J. Styles and Kurt Angle. On October 14 at Bound for Glory, Daniels and Kazarian lost the TNA World Tag Team Championship to Chavo Guerrero Jr. and Hernandez in a three-way match, which also included A.J. Styles and Kurt Angle. Daniels and Kazarian received their rematch on November 11 at Turning Point, but were again defeated by Guerrero and Hernandez.

On December 9 at Final Resolution, Daniels defeated A.J. Styles in what was billed as their "final match", after hitting Styles with his own Styles Clash finisher. Following this, Daniels and Kazarian dubbed their tag team Bad Influence, and Daniels tweaked his "Fallen Angel" character into that of a vice-ridden heel to fit his new "Ring General" nickname for the team's new name. Bad Influence then began a rivalry with James Storm after he defeated Kazarian at Final Resolution, and again on the January 3, 2013 Impact Wrestling. On January 13 at Genesis, Daniels defeated Storm in a number one contenders match for the TNA World Heavyweight Championship. Daniels received his title shot on the January 24 Impact Wrestling, but was defeated by defending champion Jeff Hardy. On March 10 at Lockdown, Bad Influence unsuccessfully challenged Austin Aries and Bobby Roode for the TNA World Tag Team Championship in a three-way match, also involving Chavo Guerrero Jr. and Hernandez. In April, Daniels and Kazarian began teasing a Fortune reunion to battle the Aces & Eights stable, however, this plan was foiled by A.J. Styles and Bobby Roode both turning down offers to join them. Bad Influence faced Austin Aries and Bobby Roode in a number one contenders match on the May 9 Impact Wrestling, however, the match ended in a no contest after special guest referee James Storm superkicked Daniels and Aries and walked out on the match. On June 2 at Slammiversary XI, Bad Influence failed to capture the TNA World Tag Team Championship from Chavo Guerrero Jr. and Hernandez in a fatal four-way elimination match, which also included Austin Aries and Bobby Roode and was won by Gunner and James Storm. On the June 13 Impact Wrestling, Daniels and Kazarian defeated Gunner and Storm in a non-title match to qualify for the 2013 Bound for Glory Series. The following week, Daniels defeated Hernandez in his first BFG series match via pinfall to earn seven points in the tournament. On the August 8 Impact Wrestling, Daniels and Kazarian faced off in a BFG series match. Despite teasing tension earlier in the night, they both intentionally got counted out to gain two points each. Afterward, they allied with Bobby Roode, in hopes it would help one of them win the tournament.

At Bound for Glory, Bad Influence were defeated by Eric Young and Joseph Park in a Gauntlet match. After being eliminated, both attacked Park and made him bleed. The same night, Abyss appeared and attacked Bad Influence. On December 12, 2013, Bad Influence were defeated by Parks and Eric Young when Young made Park bleed. On December 26, 2013, Bad Influence were defeated again by Park in a Monster's Ball match. On March 2, 2014, Bad Influence were part of a group of TNA wrestlers that took part in Wrestle-1's Kaisen: Outbreak event in Tokyo, Japan, defeating Junior Stars (Koji Kanemoto and Minoru Tanaka) in a tag team match. On April 23, 2014, Daniels announced his departure from TNA.

=== Ring of Honor (2014–2019) ===
==== The Addiction (2014–2017) ====
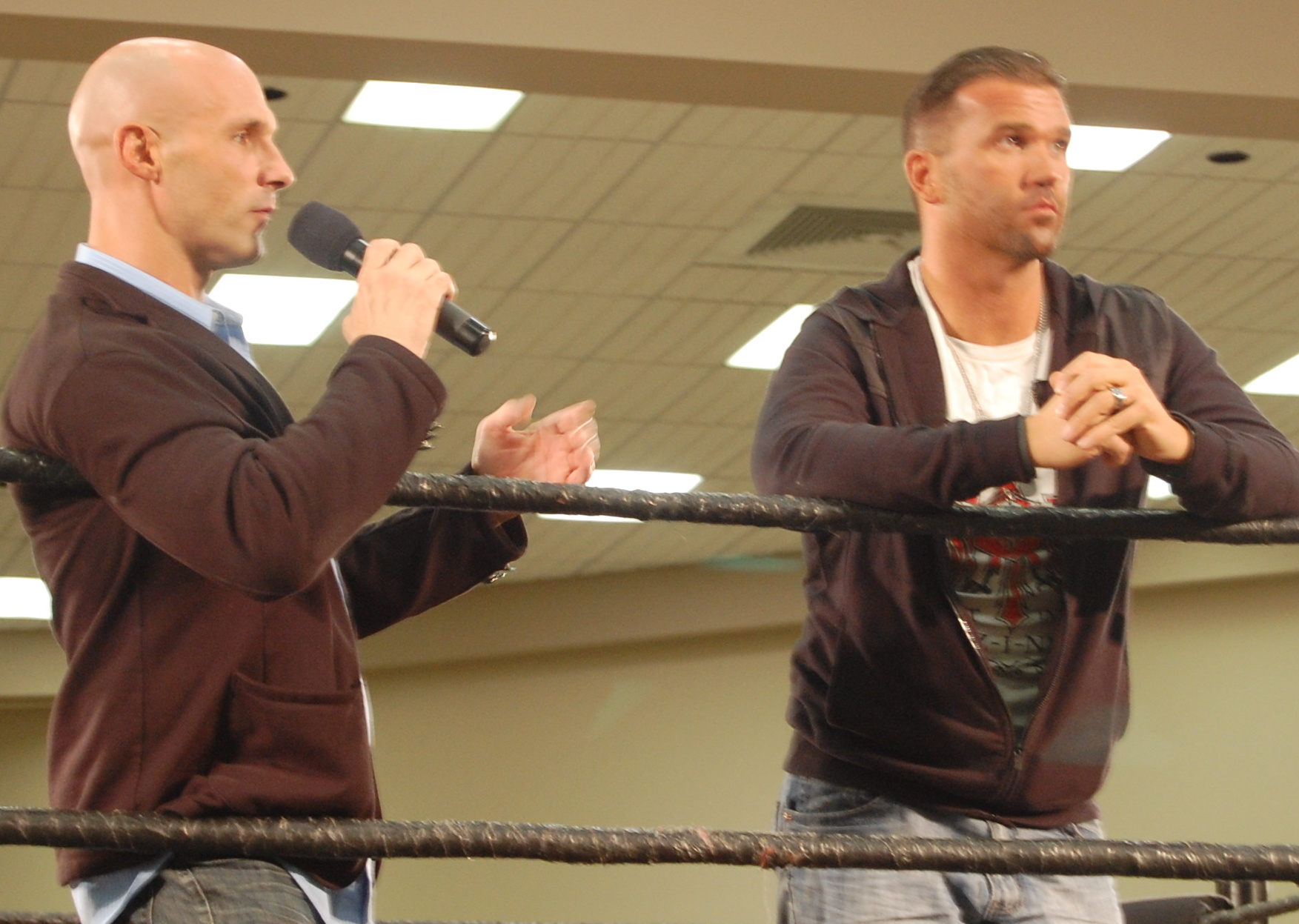
Daniels and Kazarian, known as The Addiction, answering fan questions in San Antonio, Texas, immediately prior to Glory By Honor XIII in November 2016.

On May 17, 2014, Daniels made an appearance at War of the Worlds, announcing his return to ROH at Best in the World 2014 on June 22. Frankie Kazarian subsequently joined the company as well, with the duo continuing to team under the name of The Addiction.

At Supercard of Honor IX Daniels was defeated by Roderick Strong. On April 4, 2015, during the Ring of Honor Wrestling tapings, Daniels and Kazarian defeated reDRagon (Kyle O'Reilly and Bobby Fish) to become ROH World Tag Team Champions. It was also revealed that fellow TNA alum Chris Sabin had joined Daniels and Kazarian to form a new stable called KRD. Daniels and Kazarian held the ROH Tag Team Championships until All Star Extravaganza VII on September 18, 2015, when they were defeated by The Kingdom in a match also involving The Young Bucks. At Field of Honor Daniels was defeated by Adam Cole.

At Survival of the Fittest Daniels defeated Mark Briscoe, Hanson and Kenny King in a Survival of the Fittest tournament match. The next night Daniels was involved in the Survival of the Fittest tournament final where the winner faces the ROH World Championship where he eliminated A. C. H. after Daniels was eliminated by Jay Briscoe. At ROH 14th Anniversary Show Daniels was defeated by Alex Shelley. On May 9, 2016, at War of the Worlds, The Addiction defeated War Machine to win the ROH World Tag Team Championship for the second time. On September 30 at All Star Extravaganza VIII, The Addiction lost the ROH World Tag Team Championship to The Young Bucks in a three-way ladder match, which also included The Motor City Machine Guns.

In early 2017, Daniels began feuding with Bullet Club, turning face in the process. On January 14, 2017, Daniels defeated Jay Briscoe in the finals of the Decade of Excellence tournament to become the number one contender for the ROH World Championship at the 15th Anniversary Show. On February 11, Kazarian turned on Daniels, joined Bullet Club and disbanded The Addiction.

==== Triple Crown Champion; Grand Slam Champion (2017–2019) ====
On March 10, 2017 at the ROH 15th Anniversary Show, Daniels defeated Adam Cole with help from Frankie Kazarian, whose heel turn was actually a ruse to dupe Cole, to become ROH World Champion for the first time. The victory made Daniels the fourth Triple Crown Champion in ROH. On April 1, at Supercard of Honor XI Daniels defeated Dalton Castle for the ROH World Championship, after the match Daniels was attacked by Cody. On May 10 at ROH/NJPW War of the Worlds Daniels retained the ROH World Championship against Jay Lethal and Cody. On June 23 at Best in the World, he lost the title to Cody.

On March 9, 2018, at the ROH 16th Anniversary Show, SoCal Uncensored defeated The Young Bucks to win the ROH World Six-Man Tag Team Championship. As a result of the win, Daniels became the first ROH Grand Slam champion in company history. At War of the Worlds: Lowell, they lost the Six-Man Tag Team Championship to The Kingdom. The day after Final Battle 2018, SoCal Uncensored left ROH.

On the first Ring of Honor Wrestling episode of 2019, Daniels was shown being offered a new contract with ROH before being attacked by Shane Taylor, who ultimately ripped up the contract.

=== All Elite Wrestling / Ring of Honor (2019–present) ===
==== SoCal Uncensored (2019–2021) ====
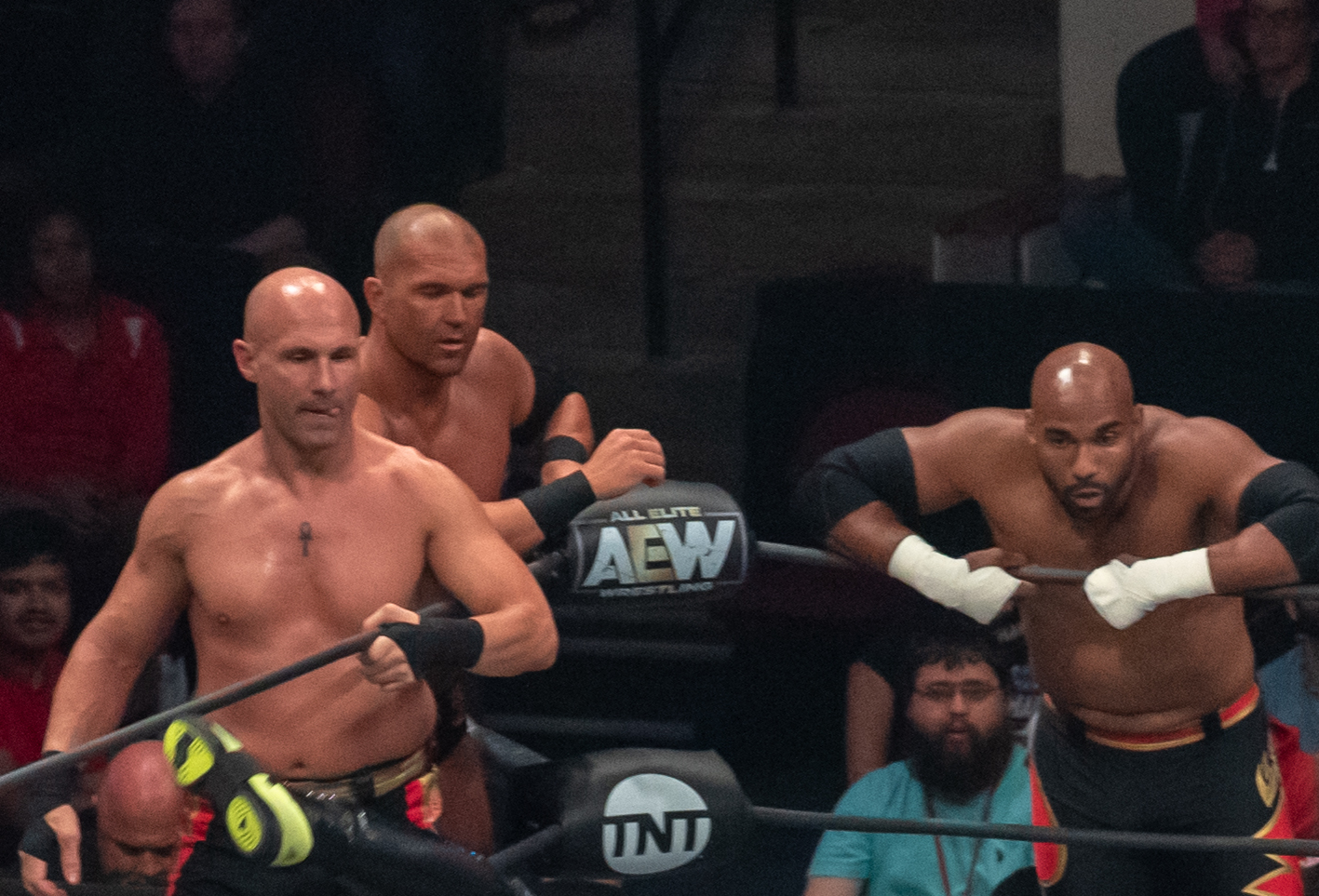
Daniels (left) with Kazarian and Scorpio Sky as SoCal Uncensored in October 2019

In January 2019, it was revealed that Daniels, alongside Sky and Kazarian, would be one of the first signees to All Elite Wrestling (AEW), a new wrestling promotion started by wrestlers Cody Rhodes and The Young Bucks. It was later revealed on Being the Elite that Daniels would also serve as head of Talent Relations for AEW. At AEW's inaugural pay-per-view event Double or Nothing on May 25, SoCal Uncensored defeated Strong Hearts (Cima, T-Hawk, and El Lindaman). The following month at Fyter Fest, Daniels faced Cima in a losing effort. SoCal Uncensored then went onto defeat the Jurassic Express (Jungle Boy, Luchasaurus and Marko Stunt) at All Out on August 31. In October, Daniels suffered a pinched nerve, injuring him for a short time. He returned at the Full Gear pay-per-view on November 9, assisting Kazarian and Sky from an attack by the Lucha Brothers (Pentagón Jr. and Rey Fénix).

In January 2020, SCU began a rivalry with The Dark Order (Evil Uno, Stu Grayson, Alex Reynolds and John Silver) when the latter group tried to recruit Daniels. SCU and Colt Cabana defeated The Dark Order on the March 4 episode of Dynamite. On May 14, 2021, Daniels and his longtime partner Frankie Kazarian were forced to split up from SCU following their defeat to The Young Bucks on episode 84 of AEW Dynamite.

==== Various appearances and in-ring retirement (2022–2025) ====
In April 2022, Daniels returned to Ring of Honor, now the sister promotion of AEW, as a judge at Supercard of Honor XV for ROH Pure Championship. Daniels was rumored to be briefly suspended by AEW in September 2022 following his alleged presence at a fight between CM Punk and Ace Steel on one side and Kenny Omega and The Young Bucks on the other. The fight was reportedly triggered by disparaging remarks Punk made during the media scrum that followed All Out. The suspension was reportedly lifted when an independent investigation commissioned by AEW concluded that Daniels was trying to break up the fight. On December 10, 2022, he returned as a judge during the ROH Pure Championship match at Final Battle. Daniels reformed his tag team with Matt Sydal, defeating The Outrunners (Truth Magnum and Turbo Floyd) on the February 26, 2023, episode of Ring of Honor.

On the May 15, 2024 episode of Dynamite, Daniels teamed with Matt Sydal against The Young Bucks, in a losing effort. After the match, Daniels was (kayfabe) fired by The Young Bucks. On the May 29 episode of Dynamite, Daniels returned and announced that he had been promoted to become the new interim executive vice president by AEW president Tony Khan. On December 28 at Worlds End, Daniels announced that he was no longer an executive vice president before introducing a returning Kenny Omega. In late 2024, Daniels began a feud with "Hangman" Adam Page, the feud culminated in a Texas Death match on the January 18, 2025 (taped January 16) Maximum Carnage special episode of Collision, which Page won. After the match, Daniels announced his retirement as an in-ring performer, ending his near 32-year career.

==== Backstage roles; SkyFlight (2025–present) ====
Daniels in August 2026

After retiring, Daniels continued in his role in AEW as Head of Talent Relations and as a member of the creative staff. In July 2025, Daniels began managing his former SCU stablemate Scorpio Sky and Top Flight (Dante Martin, Darius Martin, and Leila Grey) in a stable called "SkyFlight". On the January 8, 2026 episode of ROH on Honor Club, Zayda Steel was announced as the newest member of SkyFlight. In June 2026. Daniels' former tag team partner Matt Sydal would join SkyFlight.

=== Second return to Impact Wrestling (2021) ===
On the September 23, 2021, episode of Impact, Daniels made his return to TNA, now known as Impact Wrestling, saving Christian Cage and Josh Alexander from an attack by Ace Austin and Madman Fulton. The following week on Impact!, Daniels defeated Fulton in his return match.

=== Return to NJPW (2021–2022) ===
In December 2021, Daniels made his return to New Japan Pro-Wrestling, for the first time in 5 years, on the NJPW Strong special episode Nemesis, unsuccessfully challenging Jay White's "U-S-of-Jay" open challenge. In February 2022, Rivals, Daniels defeated Karl Fredericks.

In June, Daniels was set to team with Fredericks in the Strong Openweight Tag Team Championship tournament, but Fredericks was replaced by Yuya Uemura. In the tournament, the team defeated Aaron Solo and Nick Comoroto in the first round and TMDK in the semi-finals. In the finals, Daniels and Uemura were defeated by Aussie Open. At Fighting Spirit Unleashed Daniels and Uemura lost to TMDK. After the match, Daniels attacked Uemura, turing heel and breaking up the team. At Autumn Action in September, Uemura defeated Daniels, in a grudge match.

== Other media ==
He appeared in the video game TNA Impact! as Christopher Daniels and Curry Man as a downloadable character.

Covell appeared in two episodes of Distraction as Curry Man, with fellow wrestlers Frankie Kazarian and Samoa Joe. He made a Chef Boyardee commercial with Jeff and Matt Hardy and a guest appearance on Numb3rs with mixed martial artist Tito Ortiz.

He competed on the January 18, 2008, episode of Merv Griffin's Crosswords, coming in at the beginning of the second round as a "Spoiler". He made it to the front row once, temporarily winning a trip to Reno, Nevada, but ended the show back as a Spoiler, therefore leaving with only the consolation prize.

In April 1999, he appeared on the NBC late night talk show Later in the episode with Bret Hart. He would be introduced as "Fallen Angel", to help Hart demonstrate wrestling moves, including taking a clothesline from host Rita Sever.

He appears uncredited in the 1999 documentary film, Beyond the Mat.

Christopher Daniels was credited as the masked wrestler "Slither" in Exposed! Pro Wrestling's Greatest Secrets, a 1998 documentary about professional wrestling. It was first aired on NBC television on November 1, 1998, and released on VHS on September 22, 1999. However, Daniels denied that he played this role in an October 2022 edition of Hey! (EW) on YouTube.

He appeared wearing part of his Curryman outfit in episode 5 Debbie Does Something of the Netflix original series GLOW with fellow wrestler Frankie Kazarian.

He also appeared uncredited in the 2013 parody film, 30 Nights of Paranormal Activity with the Devil Inside the Girl with the Dragon Tattoo as Bane.

Covell appeared in the episode "Deadpool Vs. The Punisher" of the stop-motion animated web series Marvel Superheroes: What the--?! as the Punisher.

In 2017 Covell worked as a stunt performer for Universal Studios Hollywood. In the Water World Stuntacular show, he played the Deacon while away from Ring of Honor, a live-action show based on the film Water World in an arena in a 1.4 million gallon pool with pyrotechnics and live motor stunts.

== Personal life ==
Covell married his college sweetheart, a substitute teacher named Lisa, in June 1993. They have two children.

Covell earned a degree in theater from Methodist College in Fayetteville, North Carolina, and initially planned on becoming an actor before ultimately deciding to pursue a professional wrestling career.

Covell is a comic book fan, having read Marvel Comics since he was a child, and his favorite character is Wolverine. He trades comics with other wrestlers, including Samoa Joe, Alex Shelley, and Homicide. Covell has also co-written a comic book based on his wrestling persona which was published by Aw Yeah Comics on April 23, 2014.

Covell's best friend and fellow professional wrestler AJ Styles' first son's middle name was taken after him, that being Ajay Covell Jones (with Styles' real name being Allen Jones).

== Championships and accomplishments ==
Daniels is a three-time TNA X Division Champion

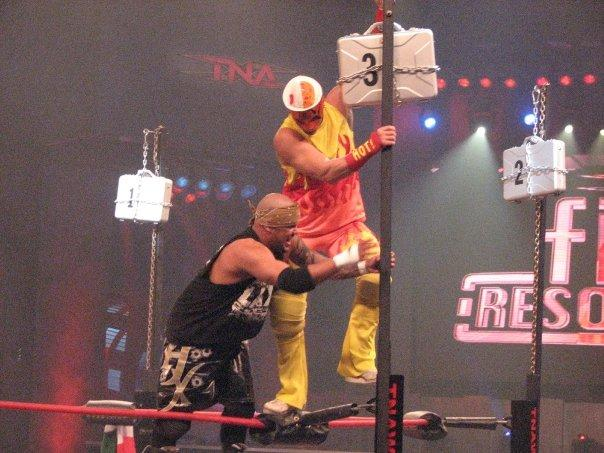
Covell as Curry Man in the "Feast or Fired" match with the briefcase 3 which contained a pink slip

- All Action Wrestling
  - AAW Championship (1 time)
- All Pro Wrestling
  - APW Worldwide Internet Championship (1 time)
  - King of the Indies (2000)
- Ballpark Brawl
  - Natural Heavyweight Championship (1 time)
- Bar Wrestling
  - Trios Tournament (2019) – with Frankie Kazarian and Scorpio Sky
- Canadian Wrestling Federation
  - CWF Tag Team Championship (4 times) – with Kevin Quinn (2), Big Cliff (1), and Big Kahuna (1)
- Cauliflower Alley Club
  - Men's Wrestling Award (2015)
- DDT Pro-Wrestling
  - Ironman Heavymetalweight Championship (1 time) – with Frankie Kazarian
- DEFY Wrestling
  - DEFY Interim World Championship (1 time)
  - DEFY Tag Team Championship (1 time) – with Swerve Strickland
- East Coast Wrestling Association
  - ECWA Heavyweight Championship (2 times)
  - Super 8 Tournament (2000, 2004)
  - ECWA Hall of Fame (Class of 2001)
- Empire Wrestling Federation
  - EWF Heavyweight Championship (1 time)
- Frontier Wrestling Alliance
  - FWA British Heavyweight Championship (1 time)
- German Stampede Wrestling
  - Battlefield (2008)
- Impact Championship Wrestling
  - ICW Tag Team Championship (1 time) – with Xavier
  - Impact Cup (2010) – with Xavier
- Indie Wrestling Hall of Fame
  - Class of 2023
- Michinoku Pro Wrestling
  - British Commonwealth Junior Heavyweight Championship (1 time)
  - Futaritabi Tag Team League (2002) – with Super Rice Boy
- Midwest Championship Wrestling
  - MCW Tag Team Championship (1 time) – with Reign
- New Japan Pro-Wrestling
  - IWGP Junior Heavyweight Tag Team Championship (1 time) – with American Dragon
- NWA Florida
  - NWA Florida Heavyweight Championship (1 time)
- NWA Midwest
  - NWA Midwest Tag Team Championship (1 time) – with Kevin Quinn
- New Age Wrestling Federation
  - CT Cup (1 time) (Note: Daniels held the title jointly with John Brooks.)
- Premier Wrestling Federation
  - PWF United States Championship (1 time)
  - 2nd Shinya Hashimoto Legacy Cup (2002)
  - Most Popular Wrestler of the Year Award (2003)
- Pro-Pain Pro Wrestling
  - 3PW World Heavyweight Championship (1 time)
- Pro Wrestling Illustrated
  - PWI Tag Team of the Year (2006) with A.J. Styles
  - PWI Most Inspirational Wrestler of the Year (2017)
  - Ranked No. 15 of the 500 best singles wrestlers of the year in the PWI 500 in 2006
- Pro Wrestling Zero1-Max
  - Zero1-Max United States Openweight Championship (1 time)
- Remix Pro Wrestling
  - Remix Pro Heavyweight Championship (1 time)
- Ring of Honor
  - ROH World Championship (1 time)
  - ROH World Television Championship (1 time)
  - ROH World Tag Team Championship (4 times, inaugural) – with Donovan Morgan (1), Matt Sydal (1), and Frankie Kazarian (2)
  - ROH World Six-Man Tag Team Championship (1 time) – with Scorpio Sky and Frankie Kazarian
  - ROH Decade of Excellence Tournament (2017)
  - ROH Tag Team Championship Tournament (2002) – with Donovan Morgan
  - ROH Round Robin Challenge II
  - Fourth Triple Crown Champion
  - First Grand Slam Champion
- SoCal Uncensored
  - Match of the Year (2000) vs. Kurt Angle, September 13, 2000, Ultimate Pro Wrestling
  - Wrestler of the Year (2000)
- Southern California Pro-Wrestling Hall of Fame
  - Inducted 2020
- NWA: Total Nonstop Action/Total Nonstop Action Wrestling
  - TNA X Division Championship (3 times)
  - TNA World Tag Team Championship (2 times) – with Kazarian
  - NWA World Tag Team Championship (6 times) – with Low Ki and Elix Skipper as Triple X (3), James Storm (1) and A.J. Styles (2)
  - NWA World Tag Team Championship Tournament (2003) -with Low Ki
  - Feast or Fired (2007 – Pink Slip) (Note: on the December 6, 2007 Impact!, Daniels defeated Senshi with Elix Skipper as Special Guest Referee to win his briefcase)
  - Feast or Fired (2008 – Pink Slip)
  - TNA World Cup of Wrestling (2013) – with James Storm, Kazarian, Kenny King and Mickie James
  - World X Cup (2004) – with Jerry Lynn, Chris Sabin, and Elix Skipper
  - TNA Year End Awards (4 times)
    - Feud of the Year (2005) vs. A.J. Styles
    - Match of the Year (2004) with Elix Skipper vs. America's Most Wanted (Chris Harris and James Storm) at Turning Point, December 5, 2004
    - Match of the Year (2006) with A.J. Styles vs. Homicide and Hernandez at No Surrender
    - Tag Team of the Year (2006) with A.J. Styles
- Ultimate Pro Wrestling
  - UPW Heavyweight Championship (2 times)
- Windy City Pro Wrestling
  - WCPW League Championship (1 time)
  - WCPW Lightweight Championship (1 time)
  - WCPW Middleweight Championship (1 time)
  - WCPW Tag Team Championship (2 times) – with Kevin Quinn (1), Mike Anthony (1)
- World Power Wrestling
  - WPW Heavyweight Championship (1 time)
- World Wrestling Council
  - WWC Television Championship (1 time)
  - WWC World Tag Team Championship (1 time) – with Kevin Quinn
- WrestleCentre
  - IFWA Heavyweight Championship (1 time)
- WrestleCrap
  - Gooker Award (2012) – "Claire Lynch" feud with Kazarian against AJ Styles
- Wrestling Observer Newsletter awards
  - Tag Team of the Year (2012) with Kazarian
  - Worst Worked Match of the Year (2006) TNA Reverse Battle Royal on TNA Impact!
