= Windy City Pro Wrestling =

American regional professional wrestling promotion

- Acronym: WCPW
- Founded: January 30, 1988
- Style: American wrestling
- Headquarters: Chicago, Illinois (1988–2010); DeKalb, Illinois (2015–present)
- Founder: Sam DeCero
- Owners: Sam DeCero (1988–2010); James K. Duck (2015–present)
- Formerly: Windy City Wrestling
- Website: officialwcpw.com

Windy City Pro Wrestling (WCPW) is an American independent professional wrestling promotion originally based in Chicago, Illinois. Established as Windy City Wrestling by retired wrestler Sam DeCero in 1988, the original promotion operated through 2010.

In November 2015, the expired WCPW trademark was re-registered by former Windy City Pro Wrestling wrestler James K. Duck, who subsequently relaunched the promotion.

== History ==
=== 1980s ===
After retiring from professional wrestling due to a back injury, Sam DeCero purchased a 95th street garage on Chicago's South Side and began training local wrestlers, advertising as far as Hammond, Indiana. With Mike Gratchner, a former promoter and wrestling photographer, DeCero decided to establish his own promotion. Within a year, he had managed to secure investors including relatives, friends and co-workers and held the promotions first event at a South Side nightspot featuring Steve Regal against Paul Christy in the main event on January 30, 1988. The event, which was attended by 160 people, was successful, and soon the promotion began holding events in similar venues offering to hold cards ranging from $3,500 to $9,500.

DeCero soon began running televised wrestling events with then-22-year-old Paul Heyman, who was also working for Southeastern promotions Southern Championship Wrestling and the Continental Wrestling Federation. Their events were held at DaVinci Manor nightclub (originally Balaban and Katz's Manor Theater) and the International Amphitheater, which later aired on WMBD-TV. During the summer, the promotion incurred losses due to poor attendance, including losing $10,000 at a show in Rockford, Illinois and between $12,000–13,000 at the International Amphitheater. In September, despite drawing a large crowd at a card featuring Terry "Bam Bam" Gordy and Bam Bam Bigalow in the main event, the promotion still lost money.

Within four years, the promotion operated two training facilities and had a weekly half-hour television show airing on SportsChannel. They also participated in several fundraisers for charity organizations including Toys for Tots, Muscular Dystrophy, Maryville City for Youth and the Chicago Coalition for the Homeless.

During the late 1980s, the promotion featured many popular wrestlers of the era including Dick Murdoch, Shigeri Akabane, Dennis Condrey, Steve Regal, and George Ringo, who acted as honorary commissioner. Prior to his death in Puerto Rico, Bruiser Brody had been scheduled to face Nord the Barbarian at the International Amphitheater in Chicago, Illinois on August 12, 1988. Other mainstays included "Mean" Mike Anthony, Trevor Blanchard, Rockin' Randy, Tony Montana, and The Power Twins (Larry & David Sontag).

=== 1990s ===
The annual Battle of the Belts supercard was aired on SportsChannel on May 22, 1993, and two years later, it presented Sailor Art Thomas a "Lifetime Service to Sport Award" on May 16, 1995. The promotion also began holding events in venues outside the Chicago area, such as the Hammond Civic Center in Hammond, Indiana and Hempstead High School in Dubuque, Iowa in February 1996. In September, the promotion initiated in a nine-month legal dispute with Ted Turner's World Championship Wrestling regarding trademark infringement over the use of the WCW acronym. The matter was settled out of court and in late 1997, the promotion was renamed Windy City Pro Wrestling (WCPW).

In August 1999, the promotion began broadcasting live events via the internet through the website LiveOnTheNet.com as part of its Sunday afternoon sports lineup featuring Mike Anthony, "Tenacious" Terry Allen, Ripper Manson, Stone Manson, Steve Boz, Willie "Da Bomb" Richardson, Sgt. Storm, The Outfit, Lips Manson and Greg "The Hammer" Valentine.

=== 2000s ===
The promotion managed to survive during the decade, and due in part to its wrestling school and televised events in the Chicago-area, several light heavyweight wrestlers such as Ace Steel, Sosay, Kevin Quinn, Christopher Daniels, "Tenacious" Terry Allen, Steve Boz, Brandon Bishop, Vic Capri, and Jayson Reign emerged from the promotion during the late 1990s and early 2000s. During the last several years, independent wrestlers such as Colt Cabana, Abyss and Austin Aries among others have made appearances in the promotion as have WWF veterans King Kong Bundy, Greg "The Hammer" Valentine, and Jerry "The King" Lawler.

On May 20, 2000, WCPW staged Battle of the Belts 2000 at the Hammond Civic Center. The card culminated in a three-ring, 120-person battle royal for the inaugural WCPW Battle Royal Championship, which Bigtime won.

The promotion remained popular with Chicago wrestling fans favoring its "old school" wrestling approach unlike "sports entertainment" based promotions such as the World Wrestling Federation, and it began competing with rival promotions such as All American Wrestling, Independent Wrestling Association Midsouth and AWA Slam. Working with its affiliate organization Urban American Professional Wrestling in Chicago's inner-city areas in recent years, its South Side wrestling school was featured on Insomniac with Dave Attell in 2002.

In 2001, DeCero hired wrestler James "Bigtime" Duck to create the main event of Battle of the Belts 2001. Duck presented the Stacked Ring Battle Royale, a match dubbed "The Badder, Ladder, Royale". The match was held in front of 1900 fans and featured two rings side by side arranged like a staircase. The first ring was a standard wrestling ring. The second ring stood twice as tall as the first and had a ladder in it. The rules had 40 participants start in the lower ring and try to climb into the taller ring to attempt to set up the ladder to climb it and claim the Battle Royal Championship Belt suspended 50 feet in the air.

In 2004, with over 1,000 in attendance at Morton College in Cicero for their supercard Battle of the Belts 16 grossing over $15,000, the following year Battle of the Belts 17 was held at the Hammond Civic Center on May 17, 2005; shortly before signing with World Wrestling Entertainment, Rob Van Dam had previously headlined a WCPW event against League Champion "Tenacious" Terry Allen at the building on May 26, 2001, attended by 2,000 fans. In 2009, Hulk Hogan was scheduled to sign autographs before a WCPW card in Bridgeview, Illinois. The original promotion operated through 2010.

=== 2010s ===
In November 2015, James Duck re-registered the name WCPW as a trademark and began plans for a relaunch. In May 2016, a wrestling company based in the United Kingdom began using the WCPW name for their promotion, delaying the launch. The UK-based promotion changed their name in 2017. In 2018, the first match for this new WCPW was held in Chicago. Later events have since been hosted in DeKalb, Illinois.

=== 2020s ===
In 2020, Duck identified himself as WCPW's owner and promoter while announcing a DeKalb event he said would be the promotion's first in the city. In March 2026, WCPW staged its Windy City Women card at WCPW Studio in DeKalb; an eight-woman tournament culminated in Ivelisse winning the WCPW Women's Championship. Two months later, Shaw Local listed WCPW's Battle for the Belts card at the studio.

== Wrestlers ==
DeCero operated a well-regarded wrestling school and helped train and/or promote new wrestlers, such as

- Big Time
- Christopher Daniels
- Frank "The Tank" Melson
- Greg "The Hammer" Valentine
- Jonnie Stewart
- Kevin Quinn
- "Big Nasty" Ed Ross

== Championships ==
=== Retired, defunct, and inactive championships ===
| Championship | Notes |
|---|---|
| WCPW League Championship | The major single title of WCPW. It was established in 1993, when the promotion's weight class divisions were created, and continued to be defended until 2010. |
| WCPW Heavyweight Championship | The heavyweight title of WCPW. It was established in 1988 and continued to be defended within the promotion until 2010. The title was served as the promotion's top singles championship before the creation of the League Championship in 1993. |
| WCPW Middleweight Championship | The middleweight title of WCPW. The title was established in 1991 and continued to be defended until 2010. |
| WCPW Lightweight Championship | The cruiserweight title of WCPW. It was established in 1991 and continued to be defended until 2010. |
| WCPW Ladies Championship | The women's title of WCPW. It was established in 1988 and continued to be defended until 2010. |
| WCPW Tag Team Championship | The tag team title of WCPW. It was established in 1988 and continued to be defended until 2010. |
| WCPW 6-Man Tag Team Championship | The 6-Man tag team title of WCPW. It was established in 1997 and continued to be defended until 2010. |
| WCPW Battle Royal Championship | The battle royal title of WCPW. It was established in 2000 and continued to be defended within the promotion until 2010. |
| WCPW Bare Knuckles Championship | The title was established in 1999 and defended until 2008. |
| WCPW Midget Championship | The title was established in 1988 and continued to be defended until 2001. |

=== Lee Sanders Memorial Tournament winners ===
Between 2001 and 2010, Windy City Pro Wrestling hosted an open-invitational tournament, the "Lee Sanders Memorial Cup", as part of an annual tribute to longtime WCPW mainstay Lee Sanders, who wrestled as Staff Sgt. Storm, in which any independent wrestler throughout the U.S. was eligible to enter.

| Year | Name | Date | Location | Notes |
|---|---|---|---|---|
| 2001 | Terry Allen | March 10, 2001 | Chicago, Illinois | |
| 2002 | Germel "GQ" Quinn | March 16, 2002 | Chicago, Illinois | GQ also won the UAPW Heavyweight Championship. |
| 2003 | Baltazar | March 15, 2003 | Chicago, Illinois | |
| 2004 | Mike Anthony | March 13, 2004 | Chicago, Illinois | |
| 2005 | Cassius XL | March 12, 2005 | Chicago, Illinois | Cassius also won the WCPW Middleweight Championship. |
| 2006 | Omega | March 11, 2006 | Chicago, Illinois | This would be his last match with the company due to injuries |
| 2007 | Mitch Blake | March 10, 2007 | Chicago, Illinois | |
| 2008 | Steve Boz | March 8, 2008 | Chicago, Illinois | The tournament final was a four-way match also involving Acid Jaz, Derik Durton, and Sean Mulligan. |
| 2009 | Chris Collins | March 14, 2009 | Chicago, Illinois | Collins was awarded the vacant WCPW Middleweight Championship. |
| 2010 | V-Factor | March 27, 2010 | Chicago, Illinois | |
