= Ace Steel =

American professional wrestler (born 1973)

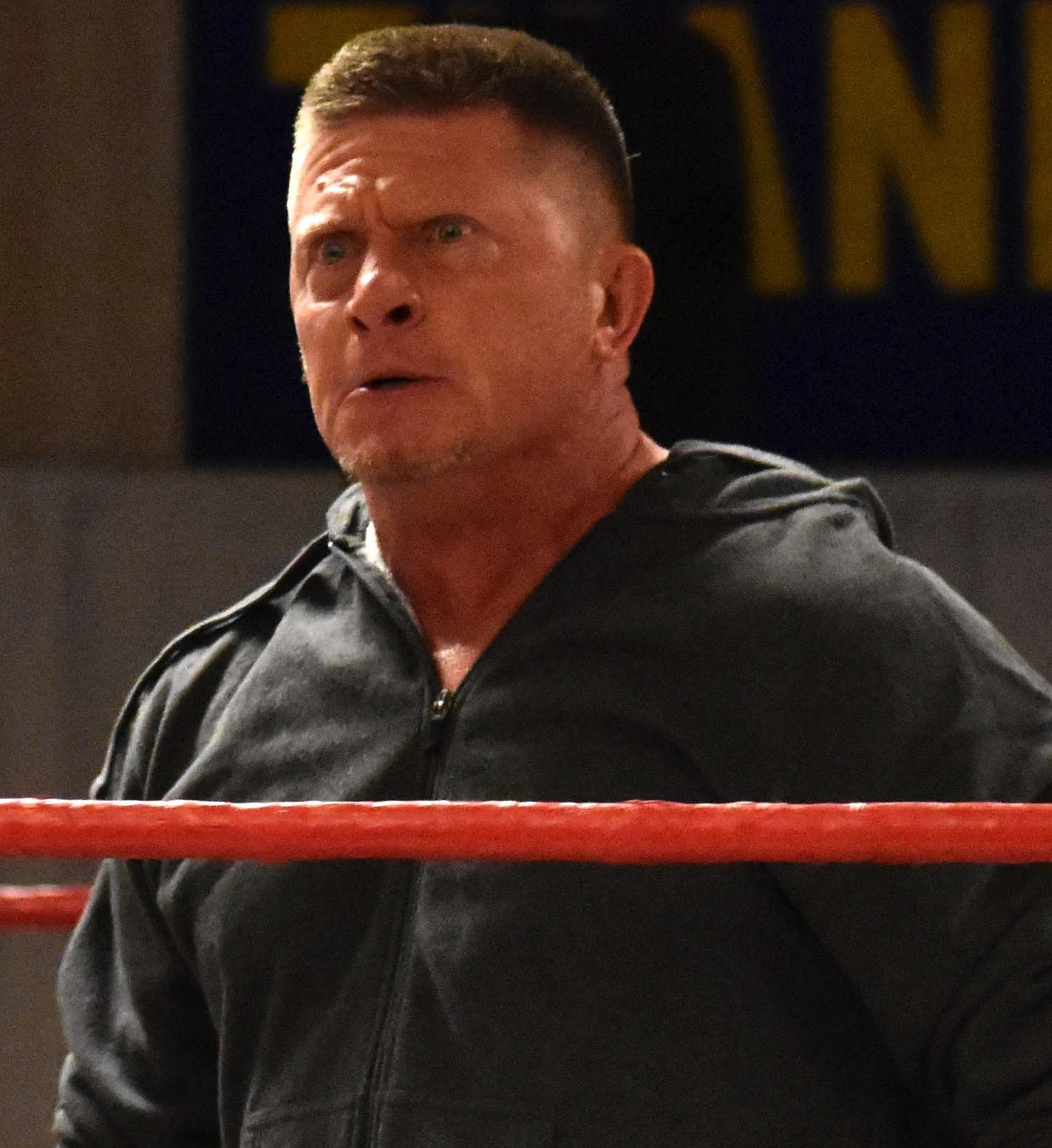
- Steel in 2019

Personal information
- Born: Christopher Guy; January 25, 1973 (age 53) Chicago, Illinois, U.S.

Professional wrestling career
- Ring name(s): Ace Steel; Sexy Ace Steel; Ace Lynch; Donald Trump
- Billed height: 5 ft 9 in (1.75 m)
- Billed weight: 215 lb (98 kg)
- Billed from: Chicago, Illinois; Hollywood, California
- Trained by: Windy City Pro Wrestling; William Regal; Fit Finlay; Dave Taylor; Harley Race
- Debut: October 1991

Christopher Guy (born January 25, 1973) is an American professional wrestler, better known by his ring name Ace Steel. As of February 2024, he is signed to Total Nonstop Action Wrestling as a producer. He has worked in Ring of Honor, made occasional appearances for World Wrestling Entertainment and their Ohio Valley Wrestling developmental territory and had two short runs in All Elite Wrestling as a backstage producer. As a trainer, he has trained several well-known wrestlers, such as CM Punk, Colt Cabana, and Joe Hendry.

== Early life ==
Ace Steel was born Christopher Guy on January 25, 1973 in Chicago, Illinois.

== Professional wrestling career ==
=== Early career (1991–2002) ===
Guy became interested in professional wrestling after watching American Wrestling Association shows at the International Amphitheatre as a child. He debuted in October 1991 after training with Windy City Pro Wrestling.

Steel eventually formed a tag team with Danny Dominion first known as the L.A. Connection in Windy City Wrestling then the Hollywood Hardbodies. Along with Dominion, Steel worked as both wrestlers and trainers for St. Paul Championship Wrestling, an independent promotion and professional wrestling school, from 1998 to 2001 until the promotion was renamed to Steel Domain Wrestling. During this time, Steel held the promotion's Television Championship, and became the last man to hold it under the SPCW banner and the first under the SDW banner.

Steel worked for Independent Wrestling Association Mid-South. On February 8, 2002, he defeated Kurt Krueger for the promotion's Light Heavyweight Championship. Steel defended the championship against Rey Mysterio Jr. in hard fought time limit draw. He held the title until March 8, when he lost it to Vic Capri. Steel would eventually reclaim the title on May 3 after defeating Capri in a thirty-minute Iron Man match, but was stripped of the title in June when he failed to defend it within the thirty-day limit.

=== NWA: Total Nonstop Action (2002–2003) ===
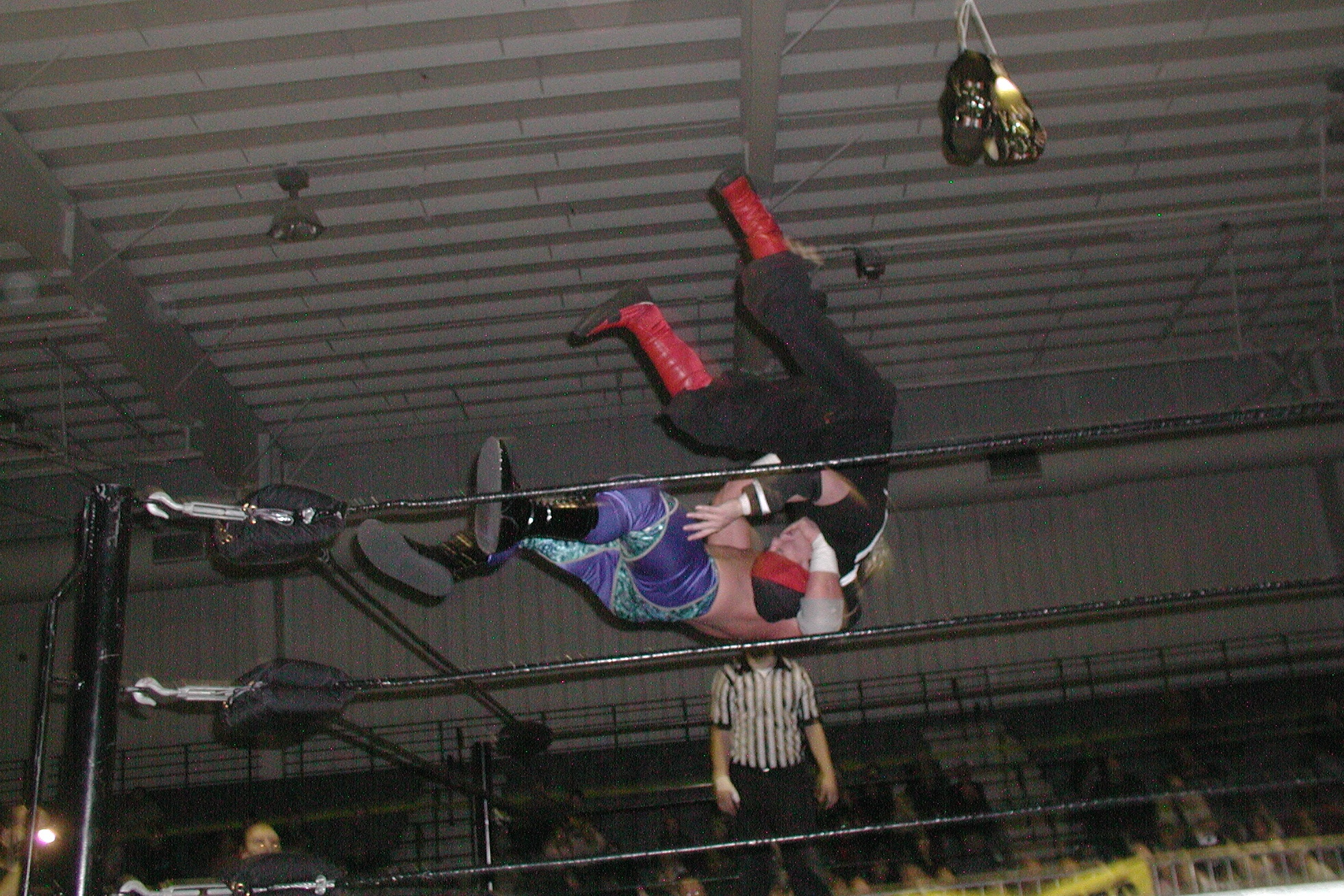
Steel superplexing Amazing Red in 2002.

Steel was signed by NWA: Total Nonstop Action soon after the promotion opened in May 2002. He wrestled a tag team match with his former student, CM Punk, as the Hatebreed and received a small push as part of the X Division, but was used irregularly, working a handful of dates before his contract expired in October 2003.

=== Ring of Honor (2003) ===
In early 2003, Steel joined Ring of Honor and reformed the Hatebreed with CM Punk. On March 22, Punk and Steel faced Punk's enemy Raven and another student of Steel's, Colt Cabana, in a tag match. Cabana appeared to badly injure himself after botching a moonsault to the outside of the ring, forcing Punk to wrestle the majority of the match single-handedly. Raven eventually managed to defeat Steel following an Even Flow DDT, but after the match, Cabana turned on him and aligned himself with Steel and Punk. Punk, Cabana and Steel named themselves the Second City Saints, in reference to all three stable members being from Chicago.

The Second City Saints started a feud with The Prophecy, mostly B. J. Whitmer and Dan Maff. The rivalry led to a Chicago Street Fight. The match had many dangerous spots including a Spear through a barbed wire board, a splash from inside the ring to the outside onto Maff on a ladder supported by the guardrails, and a kneeling reverse piledriver off the top rope through a table.

=== World League Wrestling (2003–2005) ===
Steel joined Harley Race's World League Wrestling promotion in 2003, and in November and December 2003 he represented WLW on a tour with Pro Wrestling Noah in Japan. Steel enjoyed working in Japan and began appearing regularly with Noah. The Gold Exchange (Matt Murphy and Superstar Steve) were the reigning Tag Team Champions, and, when Superstar Steve was injured, Steel took his place as Murphy's partner and helped defend the Tag Team Titles until Steve returned and reclaimed his half of the championships. After Murphy left the promotion, Steel became Steve's partner, and on May 7, 2005 in Ozark, Missouri Steel and Steve defeated Wade Chism and Dakota for the Tag Team Championship. Thought to be retired but Steel returned for technical contests with WWE ‘s William Regal in 2011 and 2012. In 2014, Steel returned to win the WLW Heavyweight Championship and lost it later that year.

=== Pro Wrestling Noah (2003–2006) ===
Ace Steel participated in tours to Pro Wrestling Noah wrestling the company’s owner Mitsuharu Misawa in many tag team matches as well as company legends Kenta Kobashi, Akira Taue and many others during his time there. Legendary wrestler Harley Race was Steel’s agent for wrestling tours. In 2005, Steel challenged KENTA for the GHC Junior Heavyweight Championship in Steamboat Rock, Iowa for World League Wrestling with Noah officials and Harley Race present. Steel has a tattoo on his arm in memory of Misawa. CM Punk and Rancid guitarist Lars Frederiksen have the same tattoo as a collaborative tribute.

=== World Wrestling Entertainment (2004–2008) ===
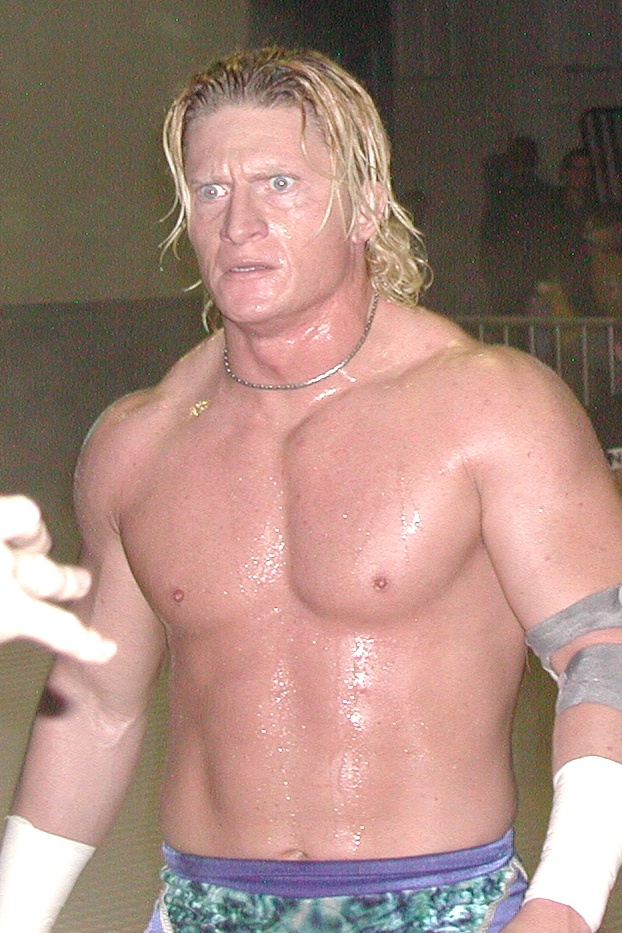
Steel in 2007.

Steel appeared with World Wrestling Entertainment on the September 27, 2004 episode of Raw and had his hair cut by Eugene, who would face Eric Bischoff in a hair versus hair match at the upcoming Taboo Tuesday pay-per-view. Steel used the name "Scott Colton" (the real name of Colt Cabana) as an inside joke. After Eugene inexpertly cut his hair, Bischoff ambushed Eugene and Steel, knocking them out with thrust kicks. Cabana returned the favor on the April 10, 2006 episode of Raw when he wrestled under the name Chris Guy, Steel's real name.

Steel also made an appearance on Velocity on April 1, 2006 against Orlando Jordan, as well as various dark matches and TV appearances from July 2000.

On the January 8, 2007 episode of Raw, Steel portrayed Donald Trump, in an intergender match with Kiley McLean, portraying Rosie O'Donnell, dubbed "The Donald vs. Rosie". "Trump" received the win after throwing Fudgie the Whale at Rosie's face and pinning her after a second turnbuckle "hairbutt". It was reported on January 18, 2007, in the midst of 11 releases on that day, that he officially signed a WWE developmental contract. Steel debuted in Deep South Wrestling in February. When Deep South Wrestling shut down on April 19, 2007 Steel was moved to Ohio Valley Wrestling where he was added to the roster. He debuted in September 2007.

Steel wrestled on the October 5, 2007 edition of SmackDown!, quickly losing to Chuck Palumbo. Ace was later released from his WWE developmental contract on February 4, 2008 along with five other developmental wrestlers.

=== Return to ROH (2008–2009) ===
On December 5, 2008, Steel returned to Ring of Honor at their Wrestling at the Gateway event. He teamed with Necro Butcher to defeat the team of Jimmy Jacobs and Delirious. His next match was a 10-man cage match at ROH's Caged Collision event on January 31, 2009. He also appeared at Take No Prisoners, losing to Colt Cabana.

=== Return to WWE (2019–2022) ===
It was announced that Steel was signed to WWE as a coach to the Performance Center in November 2019. He was furloughed on April 15, 2020 as a part of cutbacks due to the COVID-19 pandemic. He returned on October 16 of that year. On January 5, 2022, Steel was released by WWE.

=== All Elite Wrestling (2022–2023) ===
During the post-show conference for Revolution, All Elite Wrestling owner Tony Khan announced that Ace was working with AEW in a backstage capacity. On the August 31, 2022 episode of AEW Dynamite, Steel made an appearance with an on-camera hype promo to encourage CM Punk to sign the open contract for a rematch with Jon Moxley at All Out for the AEW World Championship. Steel would appear in a pre-match entrance segment with Punk at the event.

During the All Out post-event media scrum, CM Punk made several comments insulting Kenny Omega and The Young Bucks, among others. This led to a backstage fight between Punk, Steel, Omega, and the Young Bucks. The Young Bucks allegedly barged into Punk’s dressing room with several others and started an altercation with Steel’s injured wife present. As a result of an investigation, Steel was released by AEW on October 18, 2022. Steel’s wife was never interviewed.

On May 18, 2023, it was reported that Steel was re-hired by AEW months after the All Out post-event media scrum. He worked remotely for AEW as a member of the creative team for AEW Collision until it was reported on September 7, that Steel was released by AEW.

=== Return to TNA (2023–present) ===
On February 20, 2024, Steel confirmed that he's working for Total Nonstop Action Wrestling as a producer. He made an on-screen appearance on the May 13, 2024 edition of TNA Impact!, where Joe Hendry announced Steel would be managing him for his match against Frankie Kazarian at that week's Against All Odds show. At Against All Odds, after Kazarian defeated Hendry by use of a foreign object, Steel confronted Kazarian and attacked him. The following night at the IMPACT tapings, Steel and Kazarian would have a Chicago Street Fight having Kazarian as the winner. Hendry ran in to stop any other post match punishment from Kazarian.

== Championships and accomplishments ==
- IWA Mid-South
  - IWA Mid-South Light Heavyweight Championship (2 times)
  - Sweet Science Sixteen (2001)
- Metro Pro Wrestling
  - MPW Central States Championship (1 time)
  - MPW Kansas Heavyweight Championship (1 time, final)
- National Wrasslin' League
  - NWL Tag Team Championship (1 time, inaugural, final) - with Michael Strider
- St. Paul Championship Wrestling/Steel Domain Wrestling
  - SDW Heavyweight Championship (1 time)
  - SDW Television Championship (1 time)
- World League Wrestling
  - WLW Heavyweight Championship (1 time)
  - WLW Tag Team Championship (1 time) - with Superstar Steve Fender
