= List of independent wrestling promotions in the United States =

This is a list of independent wrestling promotions in the United States, sorted by regional area, and lists both active and defunct "indy promotions" from the 1990s and 2000s. This list does not include the regional territories or promotions affiliated with the National Wrestling Alliance.

There is no concrete definition on what constitutes an independent promotion. A general guideline would be that an independent promotion, as its name suggests, has no corporate sponsor or ownership providing funding for its operation. For example, Ring of Honor is owned by Tony Khan and Total Nonstop Action Wrestling is a subsidiary of Anthem Sports, so they fall outside this definition. Another guideline would be a restriction, either by choice or by financial or logistical circumstances, to a particular geographic area, be it a state, a metropolitan area, or even a single town or arena.

Of lesser consideration is the promotion's fanbase. Fan attendance at live shows can be a factor, but is by no means a definite consideration. Most shows hosted by independent promotions have attendances anywhere from under fifty to a thousand or more, but Extreme Championship Wrestling in its heyday in the 1990s regularly hosted events of several thousand fans. Media exposure is also considered. Most independent promotions have very limited television exposure, if any, as they lack equipment or infrastructure to produce broadcast-quality programming. None have had any national television contract since ECW in the late 1990s. The most successful televised promotions release shows as syndicated programming, aired by one or several network affiliates in their local area.

== New England ==
=== Connecticut ===
Name	Location	Owner(s)	Years active	Notes
Assault Championship Wrestling	Waterbury	Jason Knight	2000–present	

=== Massachusetts ===
Name	Location	Owner(s)	Years active	Note
Century Wrestling Alliance	Revere	Ellen Magliaro; Tony Rumble	1989–2007	Formerly known as NWA New England from 1998 to 2007. Is the longest-running independent promotion under a single owner in New England Tony Rumble died in 1999.
Chaotic Wrestling	North Andover	Jamie Jamitowski; Killer Kowalski	2000–2017	
International Wrestling Federation	Reading	Killer Kowalski	1979–1995	Associated with Kowalski's wrestling school, a number of his early students competed in the promotion such as Perry Saturn, Joanie Laurer (later to be known as Chyna) and Paul Levesque (now better known as Triple H); later relocated to Burlington, Vermont
International World Class Championship Wrestling	Boston	Joseph Savoldi	1984–1996	Dominant independent promotion in New England during the 1980s; succeeded by Century Wrestling Alliance prior to its close in 1996
Millennium Wrestling Federation	Melrose	Dan Mirade; Neil Manolian	2001–2013	
New England Championship Wrestling	Jamaica Plain	Sheldon Goldberg	2000–2019	
Top Rope Promotions	Fall River	Steve Ricard	1984–(Last event was in 2017 so far)	Formerly known as Yankee Pro Wrestling from 1997 to 2004
World Wrestling Stars	Rockland	Mike Sparta	1998–2010	

=== New Hampshire ===
Name	Location	Owner(s)	Years active	Notes
Front Row Wrestling	Rochester	Scott C. Despres	2003–2010	Announced a merger with NWA Liberty States Wrestling in Massachusetts

=== Rhode Island ===
Name	Location	Owner(s)	Years active	Notes
Power League Wrestling	Pawtucket	Jack Martin; Ralph Adams	1991–2016	Oldest independent wrestling promotion in Rhode Island

== East Coast ==
=== Delaware ===
Name	Location	Owner(s)	Years active	Notes
East Coast Wrestling Association	Newark	Jim Kettner; Mike Tartaglia	1967–present	Longest-running independent promotion in Delaware
Right Coast Pro	Newark	JJ Johnson; Mister Crister	2012–2020	

=== Maryland ===
Name	Location	Owner(s)	Years active	Notes
MCW Pro Wrestling	Baltimore	Dan McDevitt; Dick Caricofe; Dennis Whipwrecht	1998–present	Founded by Dan McDevitt and Mark Shrader in 1998, it went on hiatus for three years before resuming operations in 2006 Caricofe died on May 14, 2021.
Mid-Eastern Wrestling Federation	Essex	Dennis Wippercht; Tim Burke	1991–2004	

=== New Jersey ===
Name	Location	Owner(s)	Years active	Notes
Game Changer Wrestling	New Jersey	Brett Lauderdale	1999–present	
Independent Superstars of Pro Wrestling	Stockholm	Tommy Fierro	1998-present	
Independent Wrestling Federation	Woodland Park	Kevin Knight	1998–2017	
Jersey All Pro Wrestling	Bayonne	Frank Iadeavia; Jeff Sharpio	1997–2018	Iadeavia died on September 23, 2015.
Phoenix Championship Wrestling	Toms River	Don Bucci	2001–2003	Promoted by the twin brother of Simon Dean, Donnie B, PCW was home to a number of future WWE stars, most notably Mike Bucci
Pro Wrestling Magic	East Rutherford	Steve Off	2015- Present	Has a dedicated roster of talent that has appeared on WCW, AEW, WWE among others.
Women Superstars Uncensored	Lake Hiawatha	Sean Hansen	2007–2012	

=== New York ===
Name	Location	Owner(s)	Years active	Notes
Awesome Championship Wrestling	Poughkeepsie	Hale Collins & Vik Dalishus	2024-present	
Family Wrestling Entertainment	Manhattan	Jordan Schneider	2010–2015	
House Of Glory	Ridgewood	The Amazing Red; Brian XL; Master P	2012–present	
Northeast Wrestling	Newburgh	Mike Lombardi	1994–present	
Immortal Championship Wrestling	Upstate New York	Mike King	2018-present	
Nickel City Wrestling	Buffalo	Unknown	2016- present	
Upstate Pro Wrestling	Rochester	Mike "Hellcat" Rosario	2003- present	

=== Pennsylvania ===
Name	Location	Owner(s)	Years active	Notes
CHIKARA	Allentown	Mike Quackenbush	2002–2020	
Combat Zone Wrestling	Philadelphia	D. J. Hyde	1999–present	
Dragon Gate USA	Philadelphia	Satoshi Oji; Gabe Sapolsky	2009–2015	American affiliate of the Japanese puroresu organization Dragon Gate
Extreme Championship Wrestling	Philadelphia	Tod Gordon; Paul Heyman	1992–2001	
Extreme Rising	Philadelphia	Shane Douglas; Kevin Kleinrock; Steve O'Neill	2012–2014	
Keystone State Wrestling Alliance	Pittsburgh	Bobby O	2000–present	
Pro-Pain Pro Wrestling	Philadelphia	The Blue Meanie; Jasmin St. Claire	2002–2005	Also known as 3PW; featured many former stars from Extreme Championship Wrestling following its close in 2001
Pro Wrestling eXpress	McKeesport	Jim Miller	1994–2025	
Steel City Wrestling	Pittsburgh	Norm Connors	1994–2000	Promotion closed after Conners entered the mortuary business; became promoter for the International Wrestling Cartel in 2001
World Xtreme Wrestling	Allentown	Afa Anoa'i	1996–2024	Associated with Afa Anoa'i's Wild Samoan Pro Wrestling Training Center
International Wrestling Cartel	Pittsburgh	Justin Plumer	2001–Present	

== Midwest ==
=== Illinois ===
Name	Location	Owner(s)	Years active	Notes
All American Wrestling	Berwyn Chicago LaSalle	Danny Daniels	2004–present	In 2018 began branching out to Austin, Texas.
American Wrestling Federation	Chicago	Paul Alperstein	1994–1996	Tito Santana and Sgt. Slaughter were bookers for the promotion
Shimmer Women Athletes	Berwyn	Dave Prazak; Allison Danger	2005–2021	
Warrior Wrestling	Chicago Heights	Steve Tortorello	2018–present	
Windy City Pro Wrestling	Chicago	Sam DeCero	1988–2010	
Women's Wrestling Army	Chicago	Bobby Cruise; Maria Kanellis	2022–present	

=== Indiana ===
Name	Location	Owner(s)	Years active	Notes
IWA Mid-South	Clarksville	Ian Rotten	1996–2022	
Main Event Championship Wrestling	Evansville	Jason Daniel	2009–present	

=== Iowa ===
Name	Location	Owner(s)	Years active	Notes
National Wrestling Alliance	Waterloo	Billy Corgan	1948–2012 2017-Present	

=== Kansas ===
Name	Location	Owner(s)	Years active	Notes
Metro Pro Wrestling	Kansas City	Chris Gough	2010–2016	Sold to the National Wrasslin' League in December of 2016

=== Michigan ===
Name	Location	Owner(s)	Years active	Notes
Juggalo Championship Wrestling	Detroit	Shaggy 2 Dope; Violent J	1999–present	
All Class Independent Wrestling	Waterford	Mike Gibbs; G-Money	2023–present	

=== Minnesota ===
Name	Location	Owner(s)	Years active	Notes
Pro Wrestling America	Minneapolis	Eddie Sharkey	1985–1998	
Minnesota Independent Wrestling	Chanhassen	Terry Fox	1999–Present	
F1RST Wrestling	Minneapolis	Arik Cannon	2007-Present	
Paradise City Wrestling	New Prague	Mitch Paradise	2021-Present	

=== Missouri ===
Name	Location	Owner(s)	Years active	Notes
National Wrasslin' League	Kansas City	Major Baisden	2016–2018	
World League Wrestling	Troy	Harley Race (former)	1999–present	Associated with the Harley Race Wrestling Academy; formerly affiliated with the National Wrestling Alliance

=== Ohio ===
Name	Location	Owner(s)	Years active	Notes
Heartland Wrestling Association	Cincinnati	Cody Hawk Jack Kimble Chad Dillefeld	1996–2015	Founded by Les Thatcher
World Wide Wrestling Alliance	Columbus	Richard Arpin; Dave Nelson	2004–2005	Originally known as NWA Ohio

=== South Dakota ===
Name	Location	Owner(s)	Years active	Notes
New Sound Wrestling	Sioux Falls	De'Lorian Diggs Amanda Mensing-Diggs	2024-present	

=== Wisconsin ===
Name	Location	Owner(s)	Years active	Notes
4th Wall Wrestling	Milwaukee	Mario Crivello, Theodore Niles & Chris Arzberger	2013 - present	
ACW Wisconsin	Oshkosh	Swoggle	2013-present	
Brew City Wrestling	Waukesha	Frankie DeFalco	2004 - present	
Frontline Pro	Marshfield	Ben McCoy	2018 - present	
Frozen Tundra Wrestling	Fond Du Lac		2018 - present	
Great Lakes Championship Wrestling	Grafton	David Herro	1997 - present	
Hybrid Wrestling Entertainment	Green Bay	TW3	2023 - present	
Insane Championship Wrestling - Milwaukee	Milwaukee	Kurt Krueger Jr.	2006 - Present	

== Southeast ==
=== Florida ===
Name	Location	Owner(s)	Years active	Notes
Atomic Legacy Wrestling	Orlando	Alex Red	2017-present	Previously known as Atomic Wrestling Entertainment and later Atomic Revolutionary Wrestling
Full Impact Pro	Largo	Sal Hamaoui	2004–present	Sister promotion of Ring of Honor from 2003 to 2009; talent exchange agreement with Dragon Gate USA
Future of Wrestling	Fort Lauderdale	Bobby Rogers	1998–2003	Associated with Rusty Brooks' School of Hard Knocks.
Shine Wrestling	Tampa	Sal Hamaoui	2012–present	Sister promotion of Shimmer Women Athletes. Runs events regularly on internet pay-per-view.
Continental Championship Wrestling	Jacksonville	Chris Turner	1989–1991	Sister promotion of Continental Championship Wrestling (Alabama). Runs events regularly on YouTube.
Coastal Championship Wrestling	Coral Springs	Bruno Sassi	2004-present	In November 2023, CCW announced to revive the historical Championship Wrestling from Florida
Boca Raton Championship Wrestling	Boca Raton	Matthew Maschler	2022-present	Features many stars from WWE, NWA and TNA

=== Georgia ===
Name	Location	Owners	Years Active	Information
Deep South Wrestling	McDonough	Jody Hamilton	2005–2007	WWE developmental territory from 2005 to 2007
National Championship Wrestling	Cornelia	Steve Martin	1997–1999	Merged with NWA Georgia to form NWA Wildside
Turnbuckle Championship Wrestling	Marietta	Dusty Rhodes	2000–2003	Featured many former stars from World Championship Wrestling following its close in 2001

=== Kentucky ===
Name	Location	Owner(s)	Years active	Notes
Ohio Valley Wrestling	Louisville	Al Snow	1998–present	Affiliated with the National Wrestling Alliance from 1998 to 2000 and a WWE developmental territory from 2000 to 2008; also has an affiliate promotion, Derby City Wrestling, which it used to train students as its wrestling facility

=== North Carolina ===
Name	Location	Owner(s)	Years active	Notes
CWF-Mid Atlantic Wrestling	Burlington	Danny Wenkel	2000–2019	Also known as the Carolina Wrestling Federation; affiliated with AWA Superstars from 2005 until 2007, and Pro Wrestling International since 2009
Fire Star Pro Wrestling	Greensboro	Labron Kozone	2012-present	
OMEGA Championship Wrestling	Cameron	Matt Hardy; Jeff Hardy	1997–1999; 2013–present	Promotion closed when Matt and Jeff Hardy joined the World Wrestling Federation, later reopened
South Atlantic Pro Wrestling	Winston-Salem	Paul Jones; Frank Dusek	1990–1992	Founded as North American Wrestling Association by George Scott, John Ringley and Mike Lamberth
Premiere Wrestling Xperience	Charlotte	Brian Kanabroski	2003–present	Founded in 2003 as Carolina Wrestling Association. Renamed in 2008 as Premiere Wrestling Showcase. Since 2010, it has been known as Premiere Wrestling Xperience.

=== Tennessee ===
Name	Location	Owner(s)	Years active	Notes
Global Force Wrestling	Nashville	Jeff Jarrett; Karen Jarrett	2014–2017	
Innovate Wrestling	Kingsport	Tony Givens	2004–present	Was known as Championship Wrestling Alliance from 2004–2011 and NWA Smoky Mountain/NWA Smoky Mountain Wrestling from 2011–2017.
Memphis Wrestling	Memphis	Corey Maclin	2003–2014	
Memphis Wrestling	Memphis	Dustin Starr	2021–present	
Memphis Championship Wrestling	Memphis	Terry Golden	2000–2001	WWE developmental territory from 2000 to 2001; revived as Memphis Wrestling in 2003
Smoky Mountain Wrestling	Knoxville	Jim Cornette	1991–1995	
Southern States Wrestling	Kingsport	Beau James	1991–present	Formerly known as NWA Championship Wrestling
United States Wrestling Association	Memphis	Jerry Jarrett; Jerry Lawler	1988–1997	Promotion formed when regional promotions the Continental Wrestling Association and the Dallas-based World Class Wrestling Association merged in 1989

=== Virginia ===
Name	Location	Owner(s)	Years active	Notes
Independent Professional Wrestling Alliance	Arlington	Shyte Pan Dan; Stinky Steve	1995–1999	Also known as the Independent Pro Wrestling Alliance

=== West Virginia ===
Name	Location	Owner(s)	Years active	Notes
Mason-Dixon Wrestling	Nutter Fort	Jim Hawkins	1997–2010	

== South Central ==
=== Texas ===
Name	Location	Owner(s)	Years active	Notes
Global Wrestling Federation	Dallas	Max Andrews; Grey Pierson	1991–1994	
Metroplex Wrestling	Bedford	Adrienne and Matthew Palmer	2010–present	
Reality of Wrestling	Houston	Booker T	2006–present	
Texas All-Star Wrestling	Humble	Bob Murphy	1994–present	The first successful promotion since the close of World Class Championship Wrestling in 1990 and the Global Wrestling Federation in 1994, it is currently the oldest independent promotion in Texas
Texas Wrestling Alliance	San Antonio	Rudy Gonzales	1999–present	Founded with Shawn Michaels as part of his Texas Wrestling Academy wrestling school
Warriors 4 Christ Wrestling	San Antonio	Curtis Stone	1999–2012	
Mat War Pro Wrestling	Fort Worth	Jason Keenan	2022–present	
Wrestle World Texas	Carrollton	Jayden Frost Abston	2026–present	
DFW All-Pro Wrestling	Dallas		2019–present	
New Texas Pro Wrestling	Abilene	Keifer Bartek	2018–present	

== West ==
=== California ===
Name	Location	Owner(s)	Years active	Notes
All Pro Wrestling	Hayward	Roland Alexander, Markus Mac	1991–2023	Featured in the 1999 documentary Beyond the Mat
Big Time Wrestling	Newark	Kirk White, Lourie White, Taylor White, Scott Bregante	1996- present	
Empire Wrestling Federation	San Bernardino	Jesse Hernandez; Bill Anderson	1996–present	
Incredibly Strange Wrestling	San Francisco	Johnny Legend; August Ragone	1995–2003	
New Tradition Lucha Libre	Palmdale	Joe Medina	1999- present	
Pro Wrestling Guerrilla	Los Angeles	Excalibur; Joey Ryan; Scott Lost; Super Dragon	2003–2024	
Slamtown (Fka Hoodslam)	Oakland	Dark Sheik	2010-present	
Underground Wrestling Alliance (UGWA)	San Jose	Anthony Trevino	2000-present	
Ultimate Pro Wrestling	Los Angeles	Rick Bassman	1998–2007	The home promotion for many current stars of TNA, WWE and Zero One; as of 2005, is an official talent scout for the WWE
Wrestling Society X	Los Angeles	Kevin Kleinrock; Cody Michaels; Vampiro	2006–2007	Produced by Big Vision Entertainment, it was briefly aired on MTV in 2007
Xtreme Pro Wrestling	Sherman Oaks	Rob Zicari; Tom Byron	1999–2003, 2021–present	
PCW Ultra	Torrance	Mike Scharnagl	2015–present	
West Coast Pro Wrestling	San Francisco	Scott Bregante	2018–present	

=== Idaho ===
Name	Location	Owner(s)	Years active	Notes
Wrestle Club	Caldwell		2015-Present	Based in Caldwell, Idaho, Wrestle Club has been performing shows throughout the Treasure Valley in Idaho and Oregon since 2016.

=== Nevada ===
Name	Location	Owner(s)	Years active	Notes
Ladies Professional Wrestling Association	Laughlin	Tor Berg	1989–1992	Based in Laughlin, Nevada the promotion held its only pay-per-view in Minnesota.
Naked Women's Wrestling League	Las Vegas	Howard Mann	2004–2009	

=== Oregon ===
Name	Location	Owner(s)	Years active	Notes
Portland Wrestling Uncut	Portland	Pete Schweitzer Roddy Piper Don Coss	2012–2014	The promotion aired on KPTV and KPDX.
West Coast Wrestling Connection	Salem	Jeff Manning Pat Kelly	2005–2016	Weekly television broadcast on KPDX-TV
Prestige Wrestling	Portland	William Quintana	2017-2025	
DOA Pro Wrestling	Portland	Terry Farness	2009-present	

=== Utah ===
Name	Location	Owner(s)	Years active	Notes
Ultra Championship Wrestling-Zero	Salt Lake City	Steve Neilson	2002–present	Affiliated with AWA Superstars from 2005 to 2007

=== Washington ===
Name	Location	Owner(s)	Years active	Notes
DEFY Wrestling	Seattle	Matt Farmer Jim Perry	2017 - Present	In 2024, formed a partnership with UK-based Progress Wrestling

== See also ==
- List of professional wrestling promotions
- List of National Wrestling Alliance territories
