= Viva Van =

American professional wrestler

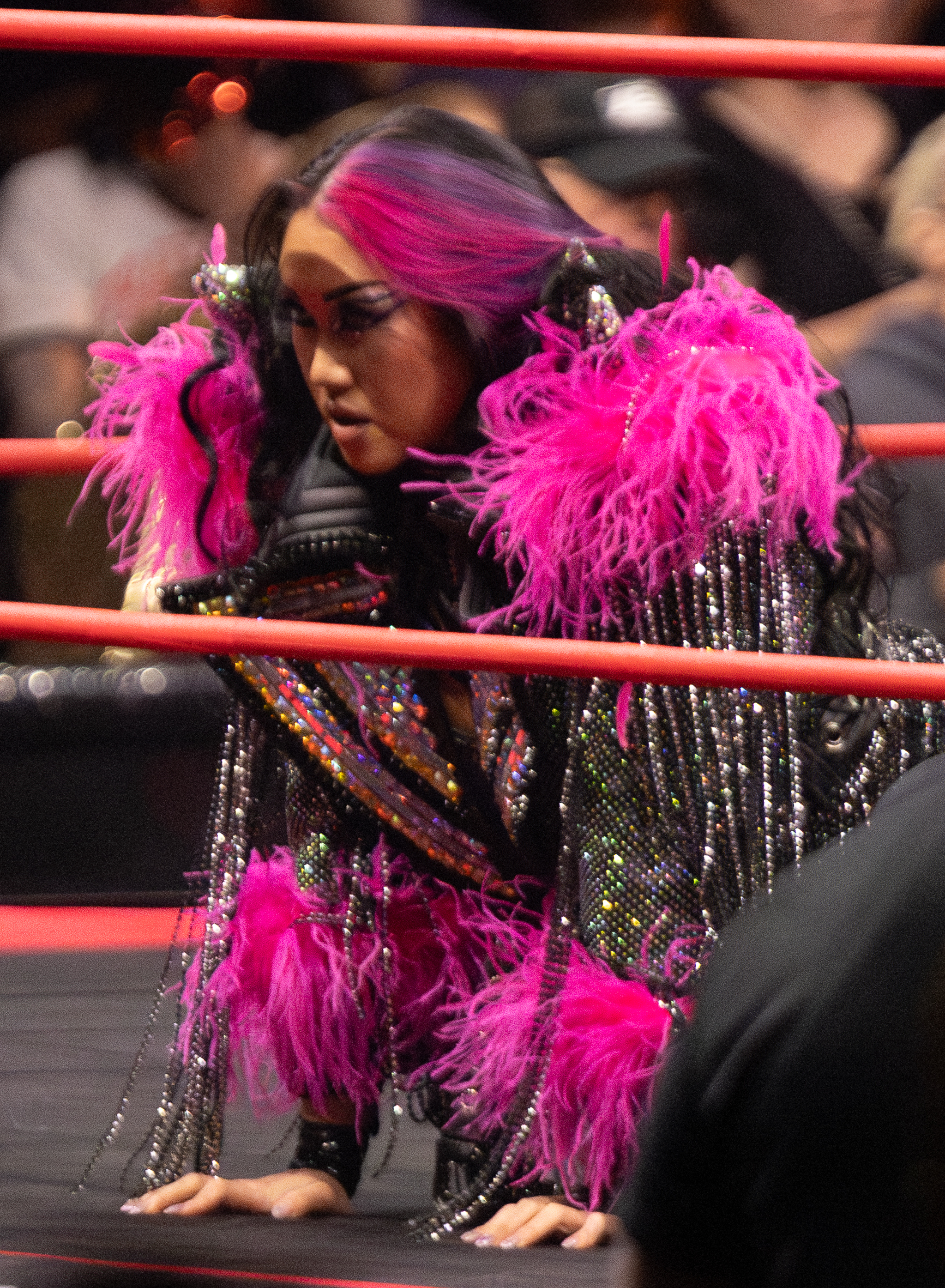
- Van at 2026 Supercard of Honor

Personal information
- Born: Victoria Tran; March 29, 1993 (age 33) Los Angeles, California, U.S.

Professional wrestling career
- Ring names: Viva Van; Victorya Von
- Billed height: 5 ft 5 in (1.65 m)
- Billed weight: 145 lb (66 kg)
- Trained by: Rikishi
- Debut: 2018

Victoria Tran (born March 29, 1993), better known by her ring name Viva Van, is an American professional wrestler signed to All Elite Wrestling. She is known for her work on the independent circuit, having made appearances for promotions such as Ring of Honor, Lucha Libre AAA Worldwide, Impact Wrestling, and New Japan Pro-Wrestling. She has also competed in the CMLL International Gran Prix representing Vietnam and NJPW Strong.

== Early life ==
Van was born and raised in Los Angeles, California to a Vietnamese-American family. Growing up, she was a fan of professional wrestling and horror movies. Her favorite wrestler growing up was The Undertaker.

While pursuing a degree in accounting, Van recalled "I remember I was miserable in accounting, I wasn't good at it at all," and "I've always had this secret dream of wanting to be a pro wrestler" instead. She eventually decided to commit to finishing her studies, change her major from accounting to marketing, and then begin training in wrestling. She graduated from California State University, Fullerton in 2020 with a degree in marketing.

Van also spent time at a performing arts school where she explored singing. After exploring the genres of R&B and jazz, Van eventually became interested in metal and later join a death metal band as a vocalist.

== Professional wrestling career ==
Van was trained by WWE Hall of Famer and Anoaʻi family member Rikishi. In an interview with Cultaholic, she talked about how a car accident led to her being able to begin her wrestling training, as well as her work with promotions like Lucha Libre AAA Worldwide.

Van made her professional wrestling debut in 2018. Since her debut, Van has worked for several promotions on the American independent circuit. She worked for independent promotions of the West Coast such as PCW Ultra, Championship Wrestling from Hollywood, Hoodslam or DEFY Wrestling. She has also worked for national promotions like Impact Wrestling, All Elite Wrestling, and Ring of Honor. Internationally, she worked for Mexican promotions Lucha Libre AAA Worldwide and Consejo Mundial de Lucha Libre, wrestling for the vacated CMLL World Women's Championship and Japanese promotion New Japan Pro Wrestling. In 2020 and 2022, Van had tryouts for WWE, but was not signed.

On January 1, 2025, Van announced that she had signed with All Elite Wrestling. On May 3, 2025, Van defeated Tokyo Joshi Pro Wrestling's Yuki Kamifuku to win the Vietnam Pro Wrestling Women's Championship.

== Other endeavors ==
Van is the vocalist for the Southern California heavy metal band Mocking of the Trinity, who appeared on the Last.fm show Maidens of Metal.

Van regularly modeled for various publications and promotions under the name Victorya Van Tran. She appeared in the July 2013 issue of Petite Alternative magazine. In March 2014, she appeared in Tattoo Envy as a centerfold model. In May 2015, she was the cover model for Petite Alternative. She also appeared in the December 2020 issue of Gothic Girl magazine, where she discussed both professional wrestling and heavy metal.

Van has her own line of makeup products called HellBent Glam.

== Championships and accomplishments ==
- Arizona Wrestling Federation
  - AWF Women's Championship (2 times)
- Big Time Wrestling
  - BTW Women's Championship (1 time)
- Future Stars of Wrestling
  - FSW Women's Championship (1 time)
- Hoodslam
  - GLAM Championship (1 time)
- New Tradition Lucha Libre
  - NTLL Women's Championship (1 time)
- PCW Ultra
  - PCW Ultra Women's Championship (2 times)
- Pro Wrestling Illustrated
  - Ranked No. 50 of the top 150 female wrestlers in the PWI Women's 150 in 2022
- SoCal Uncensored
  - Southern California Women's Wrestler of the Year (2021)
- Tomahawk Professional Wrestling
  - Tomahawk Pro Women's Championship (1 time, inaugural)
- Vietnam Pro Wrestling
  - VPW Women's Championship (1 time, current)
  - VPW Hall of Fame (2023)
