= Matt Murphy (wrestler) =

American professional wrestler (born 1979)

Personal information
- Born: 1979 (age 46–47) Iowa City, Iowa, U.S.

Professional wrestling career
- Ring name: Matt Murphy
- Billed height: 6 ft (183 cm)
- Billed weight: 227 lb (103 kg)
- Billed from: Kahoka, Missouri
- Trained by: Harley Race; Derek Stone; James Grizzle
- Debut: 1999

"All That" Matt Murphy (born 1979) is an American professional wrestler. During his career, he wrestled for numerous promotions, in briefs, including Pro Wrestling Noah in Japan, and held the World League Wrestling Tag Team Titles on three occasions. His career was cut short due to injuries sustained in a car accident, but after he left the wrestling business, Murphy authored the Amazon Kindle autobiography "The Somebody Obsession: A Nobody's Desperate Journey to Stardom". He returned to the ring in 2011 for Kansas City's Metro Pro Wrestling. He then became an employee at a sports card shop in Florida.

== Career ==
Murphy was the first graduate of the Harley Race Wrestling Academy in 1999. In addition to being trained by Race, Murphy served as lead instructor for the academy from 2000 to 2002.

During his first seven months in World League Wrestling, "The Missile" was on a winning streak that saw him defeat many of WLW's top stars. Murphy also teamed during this time in WLW with Trevor Rhodes. On one occasion, while he was out with a knee injury, Murphy returned to the ring and attacked his tag team partner, thus becoming a heel. This began a feud between the newly christened "All That" Matt Murphy and Rhodes that lasted for several months.

Murphy then teamed with Steve Fender and Ace Steel and the trio was managed by Johnny Gold as a tag team called "The Gold Exchange". As a part of this team, Murphy was involved in multiple Tag Team Title reigns, the first a win over former WCW World Tag Team Champions The Harris Brothers in a match refereed by Mick Foley.

During his career, Murphy also competed against stars CM Punk, Bobby Eaton, Mark Jindrak, Chris Hero, Juventud Guerrera, Big Boss Man, Butch Reed, Mark Jindrak, Disco Inferno, Haku, The Barbarian, Naomichi Marufuji, Kenta, and Takeshi Morishima.

Murphy wrestled on tour for Pro Wrestling Noah on three occasions, selected by Mitsuharu Misawa to compete in the inaugural GHC Junior Heavyweight Title Tournament, and appeared on WWE programming twice, teaming with Steve Fender in a loss to Kai En Tai and losing to Justin Credible in Credible's WWE television debut. His war of words with former NHL star Tony Twist led to Twist making his professional wrestling debut against Murphy in a 2002 tag team match. He competed in the IWA Mid South Ted Petty Invitational Tournament in 2002, losing to eventual winner B. J. Whitmer in the first round.

He has been listed in Pro Wrestling Illustrated's Top 500 on two occasions and was named one of the top thirty prospects in professional wrestling by Wrestle America magazine in 2002.

In December 2002, Murphy was in a car accident that ended his wrestling career. He was the producer and announcer for the World League Wrestling T.V. show from 2007 to 2008.

In 2008, Murphy released "The Professional Wrestler in the World of Sports-Entertainment.". In 2011, Murphy's memoir "The Somebody Obsession: A Nobody's Desperate Journey to Stardom" reached #1 in the wrestling category on the Amazon Kindle bestseller list.

Murphy joined Metro Pro Wrestling in the spring of 2011 as the commissioner. In August 2011, Murphy attacked fan favorite Michael Strider and announced his return to the ring, igniting a feud with Strider. In November 2011, he defeated "The Golden Boy" Greg Anthony to win the Traditional Championship Wrestling Junior Heavyweight Title in Pine Bluff, Arkansas, then lost it to Anthony during their rematch two weeks later.

In June 2012 "All That" Matt Murphy wrestled for 3XW Wrestling in Boone, Iowa against "The Rockstar" Jimmy Rockwell. Murphy initially won the match by hitting Rockwell with a pair of brassknuckles, but the match was restarted after Ted DiBiase came to the ring and pointed out the weapon to the referee. He left the business later that year to relocate for a job promotion.

After working in security and property management, Murphy launched Cardboard Treasures, an online sports card company, in 2017.
