= DDT (professional wrestling) =

Professional wrestling move

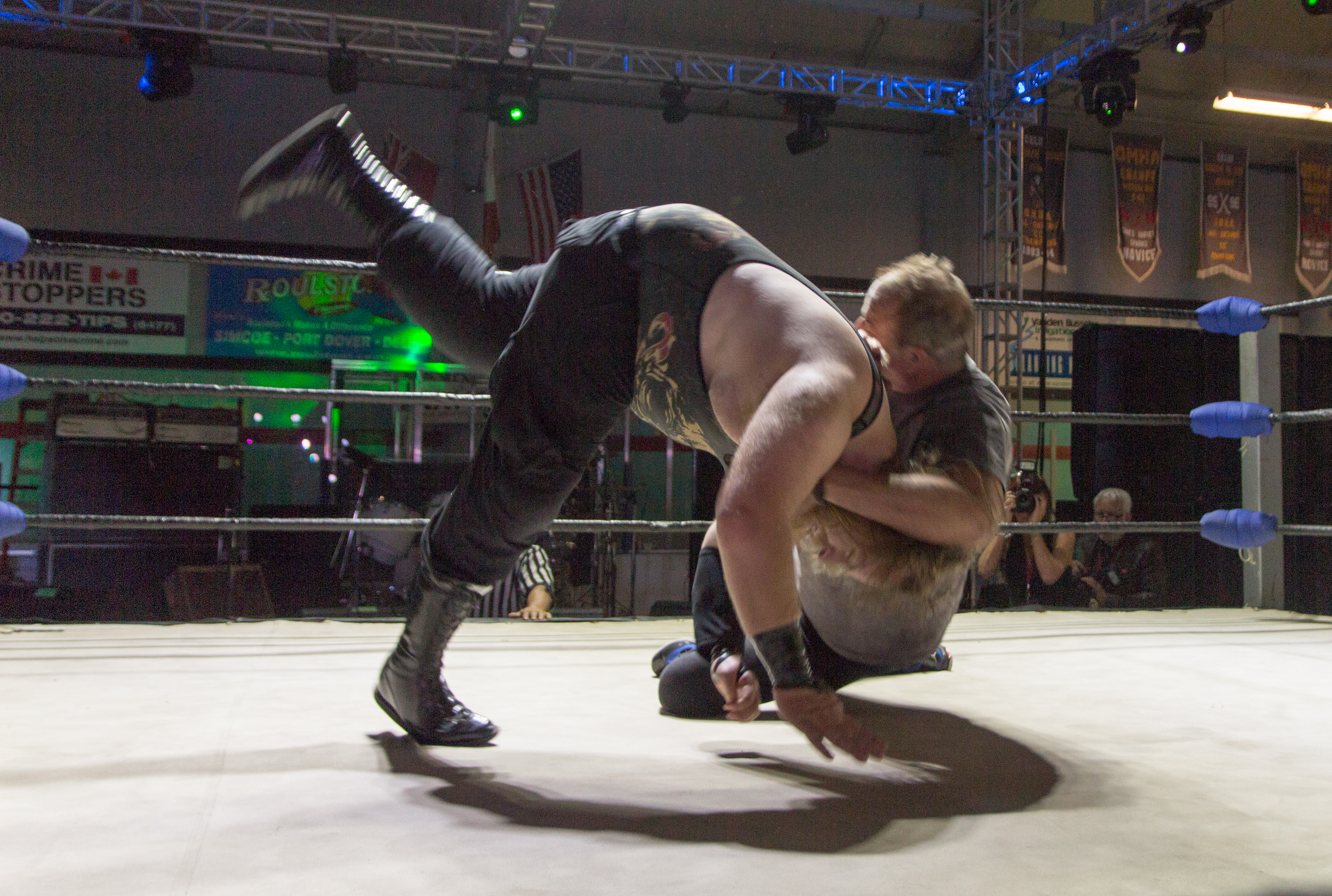
The DDT was popularized by Jake Roberts, who discovered it by accident.

In professional wrestling, a DDT is any move in which the wrestler has the opponent in a front facelock or inverted headlock and falls down or backwards to drive the opponent's head into the mat. The classic DDT is performed by putting the opponent in a front facelock and falling backwards so that the opponent is forced to dive forward onto their head. Although widely credited as the accidental invention of Jake Roberts, who gave the DDT its famous name, the earliest known practitioner of the move was Mexican wrestler Black Gordman, who frequently performed it during the 1970s before Roberts popularized it nationwide.

Rumors abound as to what the letters DDT supposedly stood for, including Damien's Death Trap, Damien's Death Touch, Damien's Dinner Time (all named after Jake's pet python, Damien), Drape Drop Takedown, Drop Down Town, Downward Dome Thrust, and Death Drop Technique. When asked what DDT meant, Jake once famously replied "The End." The abbreviation itself originally came from the chemical dichlorodiphenyltrichloroethane, a notorious pesticide, as stated during shoot interviews and Jake's Pick Your Poison DVD.

== Variations ==
=== Front facelock variants ===
==== Argentine DDT ====
The wrestler lifts the opponent onto their shoulders as in an Argentine backbreaker rack and pushes the opponent's legs while still holding the front facelock, flipping them over to the front of the wrestler. The wrestler falls down to the mat front-first, driving the opponent face-first down to the mat.

Although not its innovator, Kenta Kobashi popularized the move throughout Japan, calling it the Burning Hammer.

==== Armbar DDT ====
Also called a Single arm DDT or a Jumping armbreaker, this variation of the armbreaker involves the attacking wrestler grabbing the opponent's left or right arm, holding it across their chest, and then falling backwards, dropping the opponent face-first as well as damaging the opponent's arm and shoulder. "Beautiful" Bobby Eaton called this the Divorce Court.

==== Cradle DDT ====
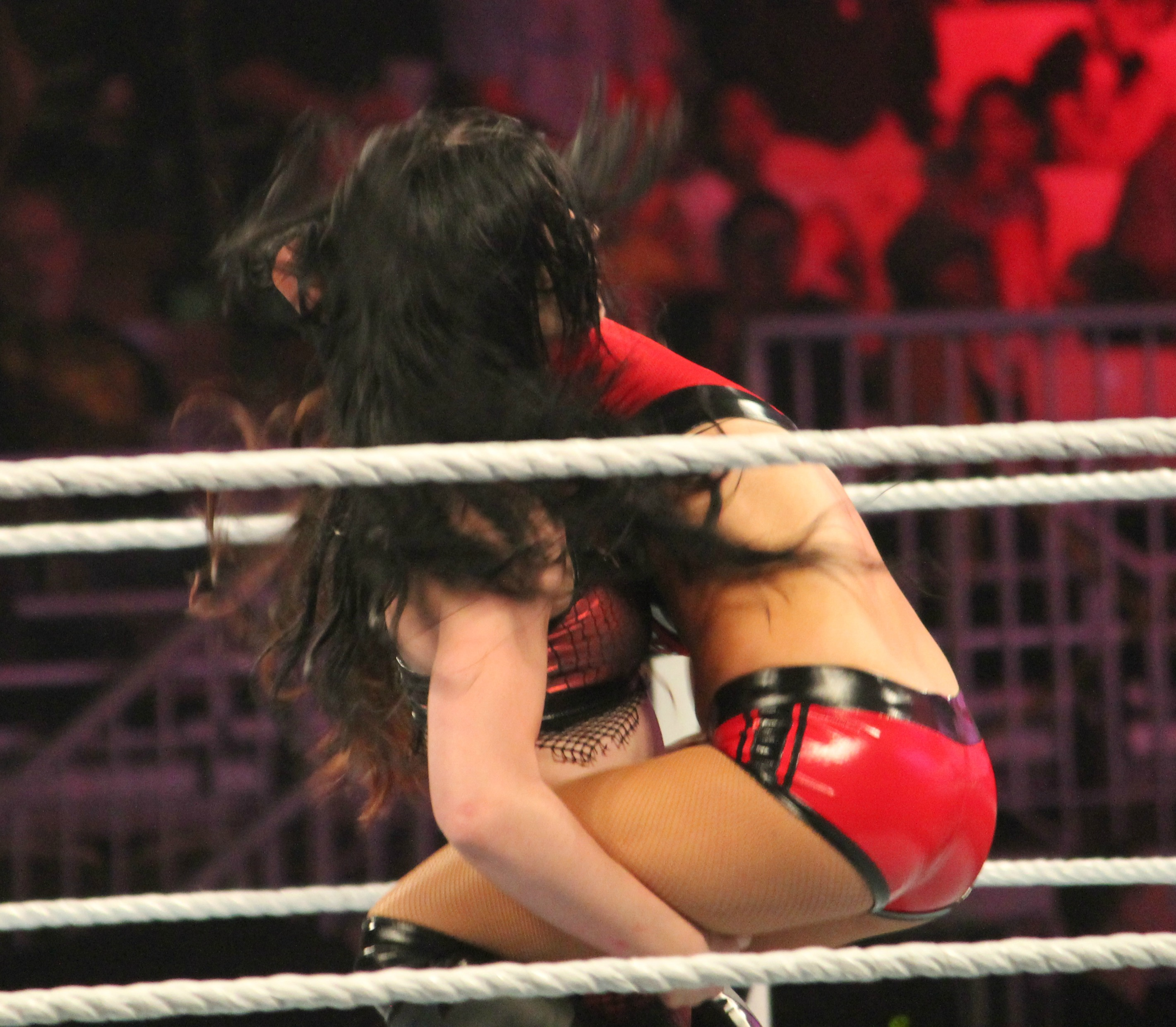
Paige setting up the Ram-Paige on Brie Bella

The wrestler applies a front facelock to the opponent, then lifts the opponent into an elevated leg-trap bodyscissors position, and finally fall backwards, driving the opponent head first down to the mat. Former WWE and Former AEW wrestler Saraya uses this variation as a finishing move called the Knightcap (previously known as Ram-Paige during her time in WWE). A variation, known as a hammerlock cradle DDT, involves the attacking wrestler lifting the opponent into a bear hug, applying a hammerlock, then a front facelock, then finally driving the opponent's head into the mat. British wrestler Joseph Conners uses this variation, known as the Righteous Kill, and Nia Jax has also utilized a version of this move.

==== Double underhook DDT ====
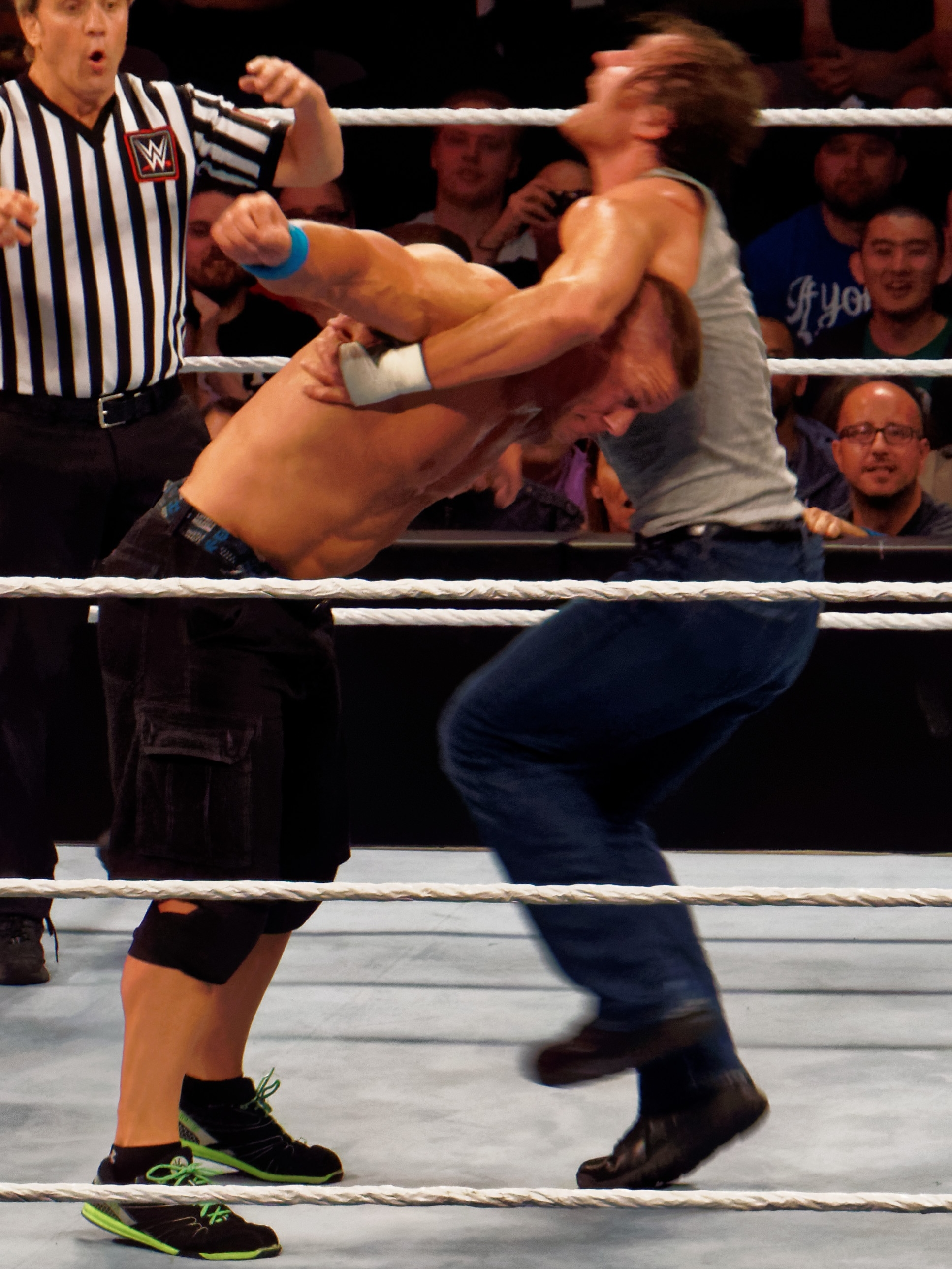
Dean Ambrose performing the Dirty Deeds on John Cena; he later reverted to his Jon Moxley moniker and changed the name of the Dirty Deeds to the Paradigm Shift or the Death Rider

Innovated by Kenta Kobashi. Instead of applying a head or facelock, the wrestler bends the opponent forward and hooks each arm behind the opponent's head, a position known as a butterfly. The wrestler then tucks the opponent's head under one of their arms and falls back to pull the opponent down either flat on their face, which is the more common variant, or onto the top of their head, causing them to roll over like in a regular DDT. It is also known as a double arm DDT or a butterfly DDT. Mick Foley, Stevie Richards, Drew McIntyre, and Jon Moxley have all popularized variations of this DDT: Foley used an unnamed jumping version, Richards uses a lifting version he calls the Stevie-T, McIntyre uses a snap version called the Future Shock (formerly known as the Scot Drop), and Moxley uses a lift-and-snap version called the Death Rider (formerly known as the Paradigm Shift), which was referred to as Dirty Deeds during his time in WWE. Since arriving in WWE, Blake Monroe (formerly known as Mariah May) has also adopted this move as a finisher, calling it the Beauty Shot or the Glamour Shot.

==== Diving DDT ====
The wrestler stands in an elevated position (usually on the top rope) and faces the standing or bent-over opponent. As they dive, the wrestler wraps their near arm around the opponent's head in a front facelock and swings themselves backwards in midair, landing back-first and simultaneously forcing the opponent's head into the mat. It is used by Yoshinobu Kanemaru as The Deep Impact. This move was also used by former WWE Tough Enough winner Maven as the Halo DDT.

==== Elevated DDT ====
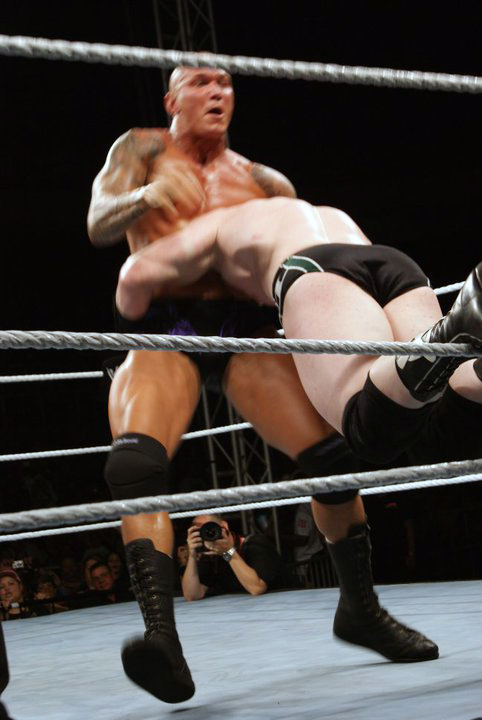
Randy Orton performing an elevated DDT on Sheamus

This version of a DDT has many names like draping, hangman's, rope-hung and spike which first sees an attacking wrestler place the opponent on an elevated surface, usually the ropes or the turnbuckle, while applying a front facelock. The attacking wrestler next draws the opponent away from the elevated surface leaving the opponent's feet over the elevated surface (i.e. ring ropes), making them the only thing other than the wrestler keeping the opponent off the ground. The attacking wrestler then falls backwards so that the opponent is forced to dive forward onto their head with extra force due to the height of which they were dropped. This can also be performed as a double team move. A slight variation, known as a diving DDT or a Halo DDT, exists and sees the wrestler and the opponent both on an elevated surface, albeit with the wrestler facing the ring. With the opponent in the front facelock, the wrestler and the opponent both dive off the elevated surface, resulting in the wrestler falling forward to perform the DDT instead of falling backwards. The move is sometimes referred to as a spike DDT, because the defending wrestler lands in an upside-down, almost completely vertical position (known as the "spiked" position, which refers to when a wrestler is actually dropped vertically upside down). When this move is performed on an opponent draped on the first rope, then only it is called hangman's DDT. This move is usually performed with the defending wrestler's feet on the middle rope but Tommaso Ciampa uses this move to an opponent attempting to enter the ring as his finisher; called Willows Bell in honor of his daughter. Randy Orton is the most notable user of this move, with the name of Silver Spoon DDT.

==== Cartwheel DDT ====
In this variation, the wrestler stands on the top rope with the opponent standing in front of the wrestler. From here, the wrestler performs a cartwheel across the ropes. Then, with his near arm, the wrestler quickly catches the opponent in a front facelock and dives off the ropes, driving the opponent's head into the mat. This move is used by Jake Atlas, calling it both the Rainbow DDT and LGBDDT.

==== Facebreaker DDT ====
The wrestler applies a front facelock and then falls backwards, much like a normal DDT, but instead of the opponent's head impacting the mat, the wrestler falls to a kneeling or sitting position driving the face of the opponent on to their knee.

==== Flip DDT ====
Also known as a front flip DDT. After applying a front facelock, the wrestler pushes off the mat with their legs to flip the opponent and drive them onto the top of their head in a manner similar to the flip piledriver. It has been used by Will Ospreay as the Essex Destroyer.

==== Flip-over DDT ====
Also known as a Samurai Driver, this DDT sees a wrestler place their head between the thighs of an opponent before jumping up while pushing away from the opponent's thighs to flip up and sit on the shoulders of the opponent. The wrestler then spreads their legs, dropping off the opponent's shoulders as they grab hold of the opponent's head in a front facelock to fall down to the mat back first, driving the opponent's head down to the mat. This move sees the attacking wrestler get lifted in a powerbomb position so often this move is used as a counter to a powerbomb.

==== Float-over DDT ====
This DDT sees the wrestler stand in front of the opponent facing him or her, duck, hook one of his or her arms over the opponent's shoulder (If it is the opponent's left shoulder that the attacker chooses to seize, he or she hooks with his or her right, or opposite if sides are reversed), swing under the opponent's armpit, then around and over the opponent's back so that he or she faces the same way as the opponent, lock the opponent's head under their other hand's armpit, spin another 180° to end up having the opponent locked in a front facelock, and fall back to drive the opponent skull-first to the mat, as per a regular DDT. The maneuver is usually performed after the attacker ducks a punch or a clothesline. Dwayne "The Rock" Johnson used this move in his early days in the WWE

==== Flowing DDT ====
A variant of the DDT popularized by Raven as the Even Flow/Raven Effect, the attacking wrestler kicks the opponent in the stomach before applying a front facelock and falling backwards to drive the opponent's head into the mat.

==== Fireman's carry DDT ====
Also described as a fireman's carry implant DDT, this move sees the attacking wrestler first put an opponent up in the fireman's carry (across the wrestler's shoulders) position, then throw the opponent's legs out in front of them to spin them out while the attacking wrestler switches the position of their arm holding the opponent's head to a front facelock and falls backwards to drive the top of the opponent's head into the mat.

==== Fisherman DDT ====
After applying a front facelock, the wrestler hooks the opponent's near leg with their other arm, slightly hoists them up, and falls backwards onto their back, driving the opponent's head down to the mat.

==== Headscissors DDT ====
Very different from a classic or traditional DDT, as the wrestler never uses their hand in this variation. The wrestler catches the opponent in a standing headscissors and then falls backwards, slamming the opponent into the mat face-first.

Also often referred to as the Hurricanrana Driver.

==== Hammerlock DDT ====
Variation of a classic DDT in which the wrestler first applies a hammerlock on the opponent's further arm, goes for a front facelock, and then falls backwards onto their back, driving the opponent's head down to the mat. Andrade uses this move as a finisher, which he calls La Sombra, and later The Message. Tessa Blanchard also uses a variant of the Move called Buzzsaw.

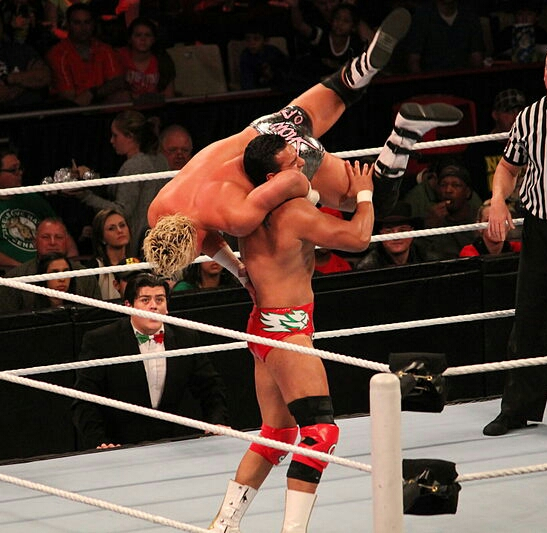
Dolph Ziggler performing the Jumping DDT on Alberto Del Rio

==== Jumping DDT ====
A slight variation where instead of just falling backwards, the wrestler jumps up while holding the front facelock and then uses the weight and momentum to pull the opponent down on their head. Also, a variation of this move is sometimes seen where, as the wrestler jumps, they use the horizontal position to execute a front dropkick to the knees of the opponent to add additional impact to the move.

==== Legsweep DDT ====
Also known as the Russian legsweep DDT. In these versions of a DDT the wrestler applies a front facelock and then performs a type of legsweep to essentially take out the legs from under the opponent before falling backwards to drive the opponent face first down to the mat.

==== Lifting DDT ====
This version of a DDT is similar to a spike DDT and is often referred to as a low angle brainbuster, or simply as an implant DDT. The attacking wrestler applies a front facelock to an opponent then lifts the opponent off the ground just before falling backwards to drive the opponent face or head first down to the mat. A slight variation of this sees the wrestler spin the opponent's body away from themselves as they raise the opponent off the ground. Another version, the lifting inverted DDT, sees the wrestler apply an inverted facelock, lift the opponent off the ground and fall back. This move was popularized by Gangrel during his stint in WWE as his finishing move, called the Impaler DDT, and was later adopted by Edge, who called it the Edgecution. It was also used by Robert Roode, who uses a swinging variation as a finishing move, calling it the Glorious DDT.

==== Moonsault DDT ====
The wrestler stands in an elevated position (usually on the second or top rope) and faces away the standing opponent. As they flip, the wrestler wraps their near arm around the opponent's head in a front facelock and swings themselves backwards in midair, landing back-first and simultaneously forcing the opponent's head into the mat. An inverted variation was popularized by AJ Styles as the Phenomenon.

==== Moonwalk DDT ====
With the opponent placed in a front facelock, the attacking wrestler performs a moonwalk maneuver across the ring and then proceeds to execute a classic DDT slam.

==== Over the shoulder DDT ====
The attacking wrestler puts the opponent over the shoulder as in a powerslam set up but instead throws them off and around their body grabbing their head and executing a modified DDT or a modified facebuster. Karrion Kross uses a pumphandle version called the Final Prayer.

==== Running DDT ====
The wrestler charges at a bent-forward opponent and applies a front facelock before dropping backwards to drive the opponent down to the mat head first, this can also used to counter an opponent's back body drop attempt. In another variation the wrestler wll also push the opponent up with their free arm, performing a spike DDT version of the move. Used by Jeff Jarrett and The Undertaker.

==== Scissored DDT ====
This move sees the wrestler apply the front facelock and then put one of their legs on one of the opponent's arms before falling backward and driving the opponent head first to the mat. MsChif uses this as her finisher and popularized it.

==== Shooting star DDT ====
The opponent is facing the wrestler on the turnbuckle. The wrestler then does a backflip towards the opponent catching the opponent into a DDT on the way down.

==== Single underhook DDT ====
The wrestler places the opponent in a front facelock and hooks only one of the opponent's arms behind their neck, as if going for a suplex, before falling back and driving the opponent's head into the mat. A variation of this move sees the wrestler lift the opponent off the ground after applying the underhook, before falling back to drive the opponent head first down to the mat. This lifting variation was popularized by Prince Devitt, who uses a lifting version as a finisher under the name of Bloody Sunday and the 1916 as Finn Bálor.

==== Slingshot DDT ====
The wrestler stands on the ring apron and performs a slingshot, and as they pull themselves over the top rope, they grab their opponent in a front facelock and fall backwards, driving their opponent's head into the mat. Johnny Gargano uses it as One Final Beat, which was previously known as Thunderstruck.

==== Snap DDT ====
The wrestler applies a front facelock to their opponent. The wrestler then jumps down onto their back, swinging their legs forward, bending the opponent, and driving them down to the mat face, forehead, or head first. A slight variation sees the wrestler draw one of their legs backwards (usually the leg closest to the opponent) before swinging it forward to build extra momentum. They then drop onto their back, driving the opponent head first to the mat. Dwayne "The Rock" Johnson used this variation of the DDT in his late years in the WWF/E. Yujiro Takahashi also performs a variation where he delivers the DDT to a kneeling opponent, calling his version Pimp Juice. The Miz uses this version, and taught it to Logan Paul. Lita used a swinging variation and dubbed it the Lita DDT. Alexa Bliss uses it as well and calls it the Bliss DDT.

==== Spike DDT ====
The wrestler applies a front facelock to the opponent and lifts them up with their free arm. The wrestler then falls backwards, driving the opponent vertically down to the mat head first. The Spike DDT is a version of the DDT which is somewhere between a lifting DDT and a brainbuster. It was used by Shinya Hashimoto.

==== Springboard DDT ====
The wrestler bounces off the middle rope or elevates themself on the top rope, performing a springboard and then hits any variation of the DDT on their opponent. The wrestler also spins around if they're doing the springboard DDT by bouncing off the middle rope. One of its users was Sabu, who used a tornado DDT by performing a springboard off the middle rope as his finisher.

==== Suplex DDT ====
In this variant, an opponent lifts up their opponent as if they were going to perform a vertical suplex, but then drops their opponent face first to the mat. Sylvain Grenier uses this move as a finisher, dubbed 3 Seconds of Fame.

==== Swinging DDT ====
This move sees a wrestler grab their opponent around their neck and lean them backwards. The wrestler then applies a front facelock and swings their opponent around, slamming them head first into the mat. Used by SANADA as the Deadfall and Alexa Bliss as the Abigail DDT.

==== Tilt-a-whirl DDT ====
Also known as Satellite DDT, this variation sees the charging wrestler being spun into a tilt-a-whirl and ends the move up into a DDT. An inverted variation is also possible.

==== Tornado DDT ====
The tornado DDT is also referred to as a spinning DDT. A wrestler goes to the top rope and applies a front facelock to an opponent from an elevated position (for example, sitting on the top turnbuckle against an opponent standing on the mat, or from the apron against an opponent standing on the ground). The wrestler then jumps forward and swings around to fall backwards and drop the opponent's head into the mat. The move is popularly used by John Cena during his matches in the WWE.

==== Standing tornado DDT ====
In this version the fighter charges an opponent standing, jumps and applies the front facelock in the air before swinging and falling backwards having the opponent hit face first or head first into the canvas. This is sometimes known as a jumping swinging DDT and is used regularly by fighters who use a standard tornado DDT. Mickie James popularized this move under the name Mick-DT.

=== Inverted facelock variants ===
This subsection lists DDTs that involve the opponent being dropped on the back of their heads. The basic inverted DDT is also known as an inverted DDT.

==== Inverted DDT ====
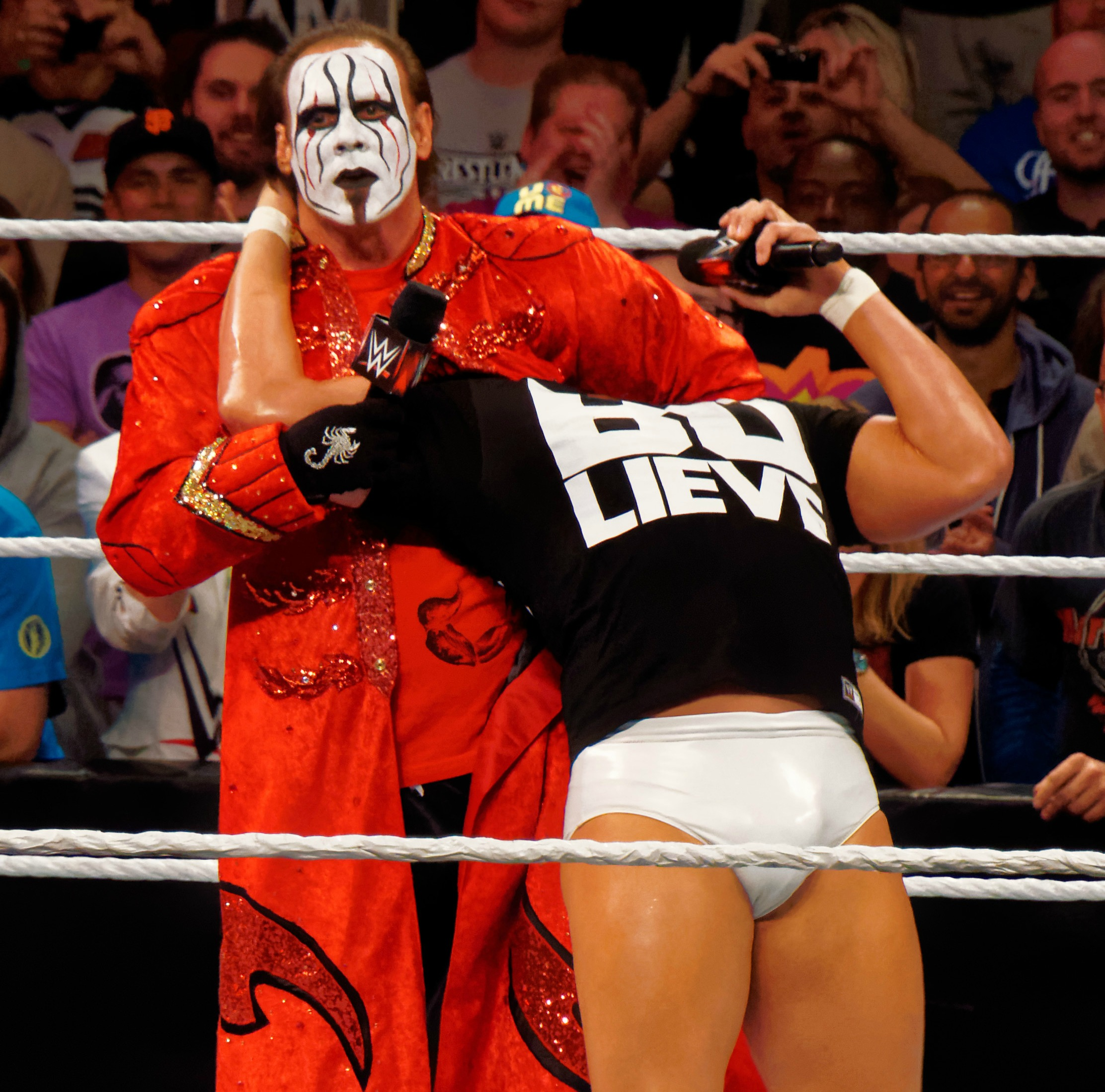
Sting setting up the Scorpion Death Drop (Inverted DDT) on Bo Dallas

Commonly known as the reverse DDT. A wrestler applies an inverted facelock to the opponent, then falls backward, driving the back of the opponent's head into the mat. The move was popularized by Sting in the late 1990s after he adopted it as his new finisher and named it the Scorpion Death Drop.

==== Falling inverted DDT ====
A wrestler applies an inverted facelock. Then the attacker throws their feet backwards, falling onto their own stomach. The defending wrestler has the back of their head driven into the mat. Popularized by Christian Cage.

==== Half nelson inverted DDT ====
The attacking wrestler applies an inverted facelock and puts their arm under the opponent's arm, completing the half nelson, and drops down with the opponent's head driven into the mat.

==== Lifting inverted DDT ====
The wrestler applies an inverted facelock on the opponent with one arm, and lifts the opponent up with the other. The wrestler then falls backwards down onto their back, slightly to their side, driving the opponent down to the mat upper back and head first. This move is sometimes incorrectly referred to as an inverted DDT or a reverse DDT. Another variation used can be done where the wrestler falls on their stomach instead of their back, which is known as a lifting falling inverted DDT. Dustin Rhodes uses this move as the Curtain Call while D-Von Dudley used this as the Saving Grace. British wrestler Eddie Dennis of NXT UK uses this as a modified version move calling it as the Neck stop Driver.

==== Shiranui ====
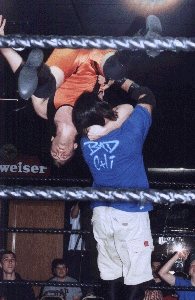
KL Murphy performing a shiranui

Also known as a springboard backflip three-quarter facelock inverted DDT. A wrestler puts the opponent into a ¾ facelock, then runs up the corner turnbuckles or ring ropes and jump backwards performing a backflip, and landing face down driving the opponent down to the mat back-first. Sometimes a standing variant is performed by wrestlers with adequate leaping ability or when assisted by a tag team partner. The move is popularly known, especially in North America, as Sliced Bread No. 2, a name created by wrestler Brian Kendrick. In a slight variation named the sitout shiranui the wrestler lands into a seated position instead, driving the opponent's head between the legs. Seth Rollins used the Sliced Bread No. 2 early in NXT in 2011/2012 season.

==== Snap inverted DDT ====
A wrestler applies an inverted facelock to the opponent, swings either their legs for momentum, and then falls backward, driving the back of the opponent's head into the mat. This move is used by Lance Archer, naming the move Dark Days and Final Days.

==== Standing shiranui ====
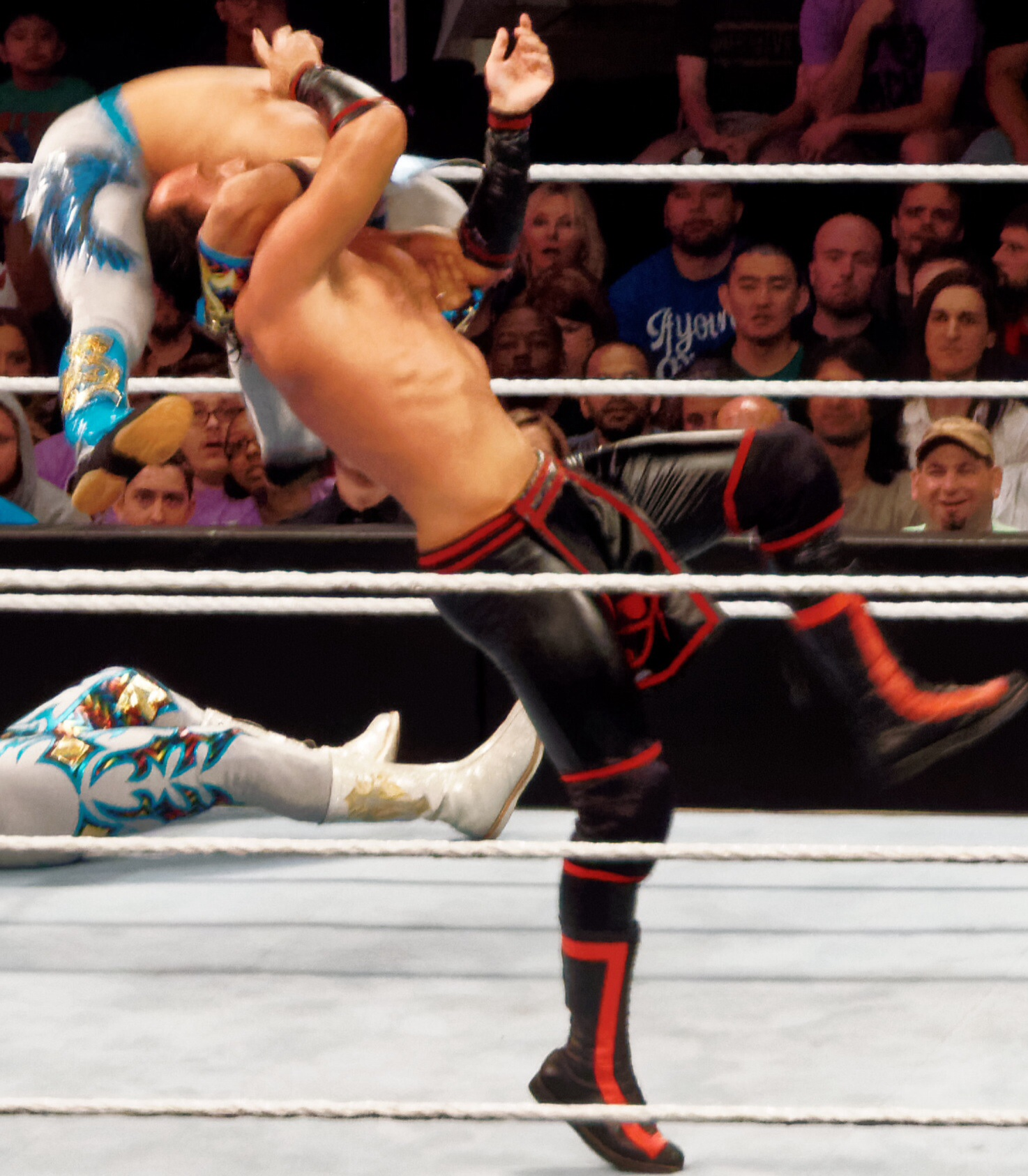
Kalisto performing the Salida del Sol (backflip three-quarter facelock inverted DDT)

Also known as a backflip three-quarter facelock inverted DDT. In this move a wrestler applies a three-quarter facelock on the opponent and performs a backflip over the opponent while maintaining the facelock turning it into an inverted facelock and then either landing face down to the mat, on their own back to the side, on their knees, or in a sitting position, to drive the opponent's head back-first down to the mat. This move has several names, usually depending on the person performing it. The official name of the move used to be the Asai DDT as it was innovated by Último Dragón. A sitout variation is also used, which is popularized by Samuray Del Sol as the Salida del Sol.

NJPW wrestler Tetsuya Naito uses a modified version of this move called the Destino which sees him grabbing and underhooking an opponent's single right arm with his right arm from behind while reaching under the outstretched right arm to take hold the opponent's head with his left arm while running a few short steps forward to jump performing while a backflip maintaining his hold on his opponent thus executing the maneuver.

Another version of this move is used as a counter against a sidewalk slam. The wrestler begins by running towards an opponent from behind and to either of their side. The wrestler allows the opponent to then reache around their torso with their near arm across the wrestler's chest. The wrestler using their own momentum then backflips while using their near arm to place the opponent's head into an inverted facelock as they are falling backwards to force the back of the opponent's head onto the mat. Indy wrestler Matt Sydal used this move called Standing Sea Fire as a signature. WWE wrestler Dragon Lee currently uses this move as a finisher called Operation Dragon.

==== Swinging inverted DDT ====
This variation sees a wrestler lock in a front facelock and, while falling backwards, twist their opponent around resulting in the opponent landing on the back of their head, as in a standing inverted DDT. The same technique can be used to end in a falling inverted DDT. A slight variation of this sees the wrestler reach under the opponent while setting up the move to grab their far arm. From there, the wrestler pulls the arm over, causing the opponent to twist around until they are in an inverted facelock before then dropping backwards for a standard inverted DDT. This move was the original finisher of The Miz when he made his WWE Debut, dubbing it the Mizard of Oz.

==== Tilt-a-whirl inverted DDT ====
Similar to the normal tilt-a-whirl DDT. This DDT sees the charging wrestler being tilt-a-whirled by the opponent, after the maneuver is over, the wrestler holds the opponent into an inverted facelock, and then falling backwards while he's elevated off the mat into an inverted DDT.

==== Tornado inverted DDT ====
The attacking wrestler applies an inverted facelock from an elevated position (for example, sitting on the top turnbuckle against an opponent standing on the mat, or from the apron against an opponent standing on the ground). They then jump off so that they swing around the opponent. Using the momentum from the jump, they falls forward and slam the back of the opponent's head into the mat. A standing jumping reverse tornado version of the move is also possible.

== See also ==
- Professional wrestling throws
