= WLW Tag Team Championship =

Professional wrestling tag team championship

NWA WLW Tag Team Championship
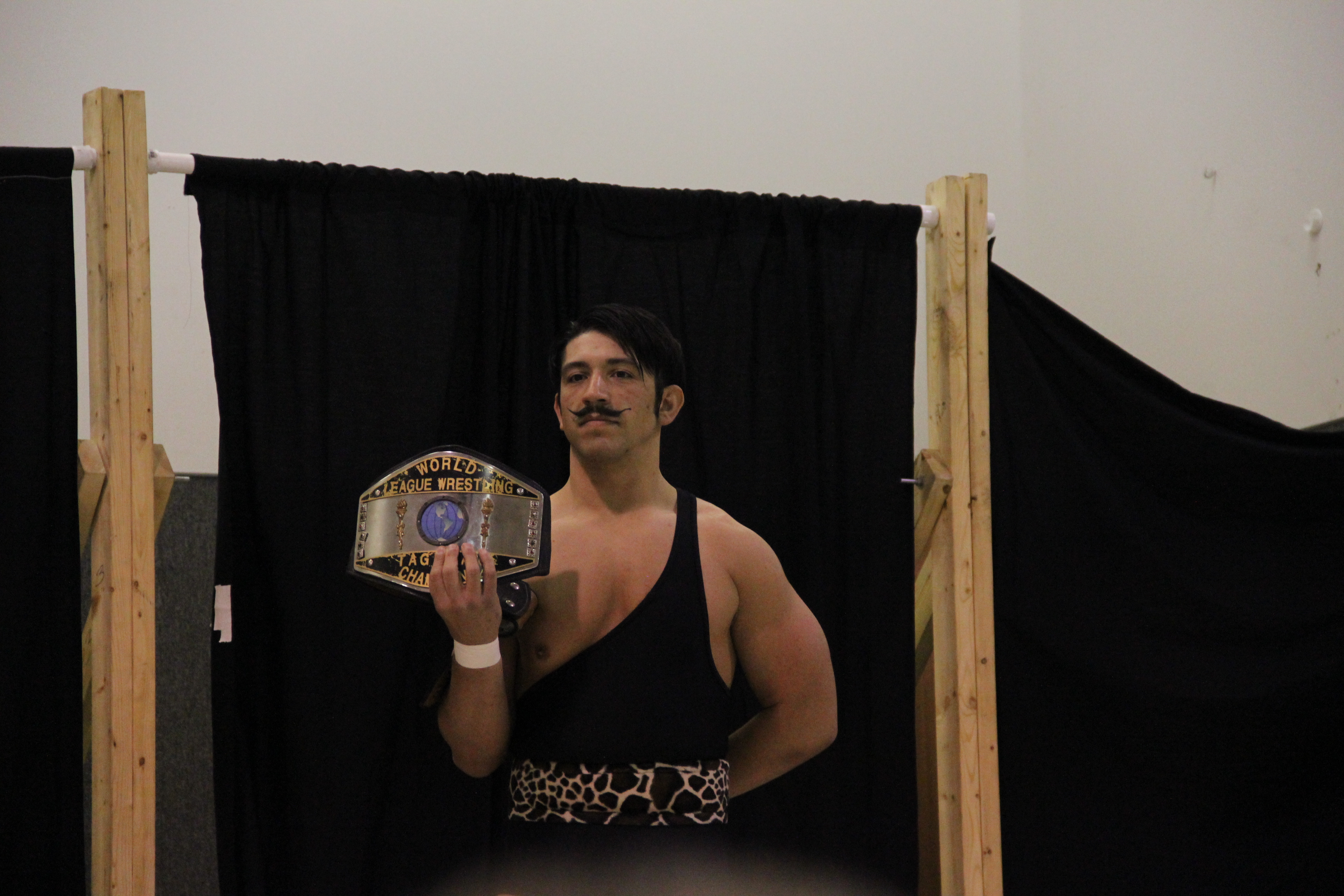

Details
- Promotion: NWA World League Wrestling
- Date established: August 1, 2001
- Current champions: Blazin' Guns (Austin Mulitalo and Blade Lennox)
- Date won: February 22, 2025
Statistics
- First champions: The Gold Exchange (Matt Murphy and Superstar Steve)
- Most reigns: (as team) Jack Gamble and Jon Webb (4) (as individual) Superstar Steve (10)
- Longest reign: The Black Hand Warriors (Dave DeLorean and Michael Magnuson) (595 days)
- Shortest reign: Dave DeLorean and Jayden Fenix (less than 1 day)

The NWA World League Wrestling (WLW) Tag Team Championship, is a professional wrestling tag team championship created and promoted by the American independent professional wrestling promotion NWA World League Wrestling.

Since the championship's creation in 2001, there have been 42 different teams that have held the title, combining for 48 total reigns.

== Title history ==
No.	Wrestlers	Reign	Date	Days held	Location	Notes
1	The Gold Exchange (Matt Murphy and Superstar Steve)	1	August 1, 2001	101	Springfield, MO	Defeated The Harris Brothers (Don and Ron).
2	Trevor Rhodes and Bull Schmitt	1	November 10, 2001	105	Eldon, MO	
3	The Gold Exchange (Matt Murphy (2) and Superstar Steve (2))	2	February 23, 2002	13	Troy, MO	
4	Wade Chism and Trevor Rhodes (2)	1	March 8, 2002	unknown	Lebanon, MO	
5	The Gold Exchange (Matt Murphy (3) and Superstar Steve (3))	3	2002	unknown	unknown	Ace Steel substituted for Superstar Steve during this reign.
—	Vacated	—	February 22, 2003	—	Eldon, MO	The Gold Exchange were stripped of the titles after Matt Murphy was injured in an automobile accident on December 8, 2002.
6	Josh Besore and Marc Godecker	1	February 22, 2003	357	Eldon, MO	Defeated Wade Chism and Trevor Rhodes in the finals of a four-team tournament.
7	Trevor Rhodes and Wade Chism	2	September 27, 2003	140	Richmond, Missouri	
8	The Gold Exchange (Mason Hunter and Superstar Steve (4))	1	February 14, 2004	69	Eldon, MO	
9	Cody Hawk and Dakota	1	April 23, 2004	1	Richmond, MO	
—	Vacated	—	April 24, 2004	—	Winona, MO	The titles were held up after a match between The Gold Exchange and Dakota and Cody Hawk.
10	Derek McQuinn and T-Money	1	June 5, 2004	161	Eldon, MO	Defeated Trevor Rhodes and Superstar Steve in the finals of a tournament.
11	Wade Chism (2) and Dakota (2)	1	November 13, 2004	175	Kansas City, MO	
12	Ace Steel and Superstar Steve (5)	1	May 7, 2005	unknown	Ozark, MO	
—	Vacated	—	unknown	—	unknown	The titles were vacated.
13	Ty Dalton and Angelo	1	January 28, 2006	315	Eldon, MO	Defeated The Midwest Mafia (Robert Anthony and Scarpone) in the finals of a five-team, one-night tournament.
14	Wade Chism (3) and Mike DiBiase	1	December 9, 2006	unknown	Maryland Heights, MO	
—	Vacated	—	unknown	—	unknown	The titles were vacated.
15	Dinn T. Moore and Brandon Tatum	1	March 17, 2007	224	Eldon, MO	Defeated Superstar Steve and Dakota in the final match of a series to determine the new champions.
16	Superstar Steve (6) and Darin Waid	1	October 27, 2007	133	Maryland Heights, MO	
17	Steve Anthony and Marc Godecker (2)	1	March 8, 2008	230	Maryland Heights, MO	
18	Brian Breaker and Dinn T. Moore (2)	1	October 24, 2008	98	Warsaw, MO	
19	Dustin Lane and Darin Waid (2)	1	January 30, 2009	161	Richmond, MO	
20	Steve Anthony (2) and Bao Nguyen	1	July 10, 2009	unknown	Waterloo, IA	Defeated Jason Jones (substituting for Justin Lane) and Darin Waid at Night of Legends.
—	Vacated	—	unknown	—	unknown	The titles were vacated.
21	Superstar Steve (7) and Mark Sterling	1	March 6, 2010	455	El Dorado Springs, MO	Defeated Brian Breaker and Ryan Drago in the tournament finals.
22	Ethan Wright and The Canucn Kid	1	May 12, 2010	unknown	Eldon, Missouri	
—	Vacated	—	unknown	—	unknown	
23	Strong And Reckless (Jack Gamble and Jeff Strong)	1	November 12, 2011	315	Richmond, Missouri	
24	High Level Enterprise(Jack Gamble (2) and Jon Webb)	1	September 22, 2012	49	unknown	Gamble chooses Webb when Strong is unable to defend the title for the card scheduled on September 22, 2012.
25	Elvis Aliaga and Ryan Drago	1	November 10, 2012	160	Springfield, Missouri	
26	Rope and Rangle(Britton Tucker and Kris Wallace)	1	April 19, 2013	134	Eldon, Missouri	
27	Black Hand Warriors(Michael Magnuson and Dark Shadows(Dave DeLorean))	1	August 31, 2013	350	Linn, Missouri	
28	High Level Enterprise(Jack Gamble and Jon Webb)	2	August 16, 2014	13	Richmond, Missouri	
29	Black Hand Warriors(Michael Magnuson and Dave DeLorean)	2	August 29, 2014	15	Vienna, Missouri	
30	High Level Enterprise(Jack Gamble and Jon Webb)	3	September 13, 2014	178	Linn, Missouri	
—	Vacated	—	unknown	—	unknown	Vacated when the team left for Japan.
31	Black Hand Warriors(Dave DeLorean (3) and Jayden Fenix)	1	June 26, 2015	1	Troy, Missouri	Defeated Brandon Espinosa and Justin D'Air in tournament final.
32	Elite Aggression(Superstar Steve (8) and Derek McQuinn (2))	1	June 26, 2015	267	Troy, Missouri	Superstar Steve cashed in a championship contract for an impromptu match.
33	Black Hand Warriors(Michael Magnuson (3) and Dave DeLorean (4))	3	March 19, 2016	595	Troy, Missouri	Defeated Superstar Steve and Mark Sterling due to injury to Derek McQuinn.
34	Brandon Espinosa and Steve Fender	1	November 4, 2017	126	Troy, Missouri	
35	Kyle Roberts and Scott Steiner	1	March 10, 2018	56	Moscow Mills, Missouri	
36	Brandon Espinosa and Steve Fender	2	May 5, 2018	154	Missouri, USA	
37	Kyle Roberts and Rex Fults	1	October 6, 2018	371	Troy, Missouri	
38	Derek Stone and Jon Webb	1	October 12, 2019	133	Troy, Missouri	
39	Colton Theron Vaught and Moses Powell	1	February 22, 2020	140	Troy, Missouri	
40	The Empire (Camaro Jackson and Jon Webb)	1	July 11, 2020	294	Troy, Missouri	
41	Colton Theron Vaught and Kyle Roberts	1	May 1, 2021	287	Troy, Missouri	
—	Vacated	—	unknown	—	unknown	
42	Jack Gamble and Jon Webb	4	June 18, 2022	56	Troy, Missouri	
43	Brandon Espinosa and Kyle Roberts	1	August 13, 2022	84	Troy, Missouri	
44	Billy Jarrell and Luke Anthony	1	November 5, 2022	35	Troy, Missouri	
45	Brandon Espinosa and Kyle Roberts	2	December 10, 2022	175	Troy, Missouri	
46	Camaro Jackson and Leland Race	1	June 3, 2023	252	Troy, Missouri	
47	Dysfunction (Brandon Espinosa, Kyle Roberts and Tom Coffey)	1	February 10, 2024	378	Troy, Missouri	
48	Blazin' Guns (Austin Mulitalo and Blade Lennox)	1	February 22, 2025	50+	Troy, Missouri	
