= Warriors 4 Christ Wrestling =

Professional wrestling organization

- Acronym: W4CW
- Founded: 1999
- Defunct: 2012
- Style: Professional Wrestling
- Headquarters: San Antonio, Texas
- Founder(s): Curtis Stone
- Parent: Warrior 4 Christ INC.

Warriors 4 Christ Wrestling (W4CW, originally Southern Heat Championship Wrestling) was an independent professional wrestling promotion based in San Antonio, Texas. W4CW is a non-profit organization operated by Warriors 4 Christ INC.

== History ==
The company's founder and President, Curtis Stone A.K.A. "Nightmare", Cheyene, George Carey, The Rolling Stone (Part of the Tag-Team Rolling Stones), Mark McFadden, formerly competed as a professional wrestler and has operated the organization since 1999. Stone previously worked as an enforcer for drug dealers, collecting money from debtors, before he became a Christian. The promotion was originally called Southern Heat Championship Wrestling. The name was considered too suggestive by some churches, however, so the organization was renamed in late summer of 2006.

W4CW promotes wrestling events at schools and churches, and proceeds are donated to local charities, such as orphanages, woman's shelters, and churches. W4CW events also features Christian musical acts, and some include sermons. Although W4CW includes a religious aspect, matches are conducted the same way as in other promotions. Foreign objects, such as chairs, are used as weapons during matches. All wrestlers are trained, and many are pursuing long-term careers in professional wrestling. The promotion was founded as a "family friendly" alternative, at a time when the pro wrestling industry was dominated by the World Wrestling Federation's "Attitude Era", and remained so throughout its run. Because of the nature of a Christian wrestling promotion, however, W4CW has met with resistance from some fans and churches, both of whom are suspicious of an organization that combines professional wrestling with religion.

W4CW's headquarters is in San Antonio and operates over 40 shows each year, which take place both in the United States and Mexico. Many of the shows are free, and events are usually attended by several hundred people. It was named Promotion of the Year in 2008 by the San Antonio Independent Wrestling Scene. The promotion's top championship is the W4CW Heavyweight Championship, which is currently held by The Great Ryu, and Intercontinental Champion Tony Vega and Middle Weight Champion is Weazy Woo, Tag Team Champions are "Double Trouble" (Chris James and Tony Vega). In October 2009, the promotion was featured on KENS-TV.

Warriors 4 Christ Wrestling stopped holding regular events after 2009, relocating to Colorado the following year, and remained active in the Christian community making appearances at the Springs Church in Colorado Springs until 2012.

== Champions ==
Championship	Current champion(s)	Date won	Previous Champion
W4CW Heavyweight Championship*	The Great Ryu	March 11, 2008	Vacant
W4CW Intercontinental Championship	Tony Vega	November 16, 2008	Vacant
W4CW Cruiserweight Championship	Weazy Woo	November 16, 2008	Joey Nitro
W4CW Tag Team Championship	Double Trouble	January 7, 2009	The Great Ryu and Dragon X (Cobra and Chino Reyes)

== Roster ==
=== Male wrestlers ===
- Dusty Wolfe
- Doink the Clown
- Curtis Stone aka Nightmare
- Tommy Gunn
- Tony Vega
- Chris James
- Prince Al Farat
- Big Time Tommy
- Weazy Woo
- Rocky Morocco
- The Great Ryu
- Dragon X
- Wild Man Jack
- Johnny Ruckus
- Mighty B
- The Crucifix
- Krazy Klown
- El Gusanito
- Black and White
- Mizkeen
- Mechanico Loco

=== Other on-screen personnel ===
- Filthy Rich - Manager and Trainer
- The Fire Up Kid (Ralphy) "Manager"
- Lucious - Manager
- Bishop Brown - "Ring Announcer"
- Ray The Voice - Ring Announcer
- Alex / Rin Tin Tin / Alfred - Referee
