= National Wrasslin' League =

- Acronym: NWL
- Founded: July 2016
- Defunct: April 2018
- Headquarters: Kansas City, Missouri
- Founder: Major Baisden
- Owner: Major Baisden
- Website: http://www.nwleague.com/

The National Wrasslin' League (NWL) was an independent professional wrestling promotion based in Kansas City, Missouri. Founded in July 2016 by Major Baisden, the NWL promoted live events in Kansas City and St. Louis under the banners of NWL KC and NWL STL, respectively. The NWL's concept was centered around signing homegrown talent from each area, along with free agents from across the country, who would perform in family-friendly storylines centered around personal issues and intercity rivalries. The NWL product was geared primarily at families and men 34–48 who used to watch wrestling before becoming disinterested in the current product. The promotion closed on April 12, 2018. They closed due to low numbers and attendance.

== History ==
Major Baisden decided to launch a professional wrestling company after observing a continual drop in popularity for World Wrestling Entertainment (WWE), a publicly traded company owned by Vince McMahon, and the emergence of popular regional “indies”—independently owned and operated wrestling promotions in former industry hotbeds nationwide. Baisden recognized a void in the marketplace for locally owned promotions with high production values, backed by professional marketing in cities where indie wrestling was thriving.

In May 2016, Baisden began scouting indies in both Kansas City and St. Louis to purchase, with the idea of building on the foundation of loyal fans in each city and establishing communication with prospective talent.

In July 2016, Baisden began negotiating with Metro Pro Wrestling, owned by Chris Gough. In August 2016, Baisden and Gough finalized terms on a deal that included Gough joining the NWL as director of talent relations and head of creative. Travis Scott Bowden, a former performer and writer for the Memphis Wrestling promotion owned by Jerry Lawler and Jerry Jarrett, joined the NWL in July 2016 as VP of marketing and creative assistant. The NWL formally announced its definitive agreement to acquire the assets of Metro Pro on October 27, 2016. Baisden also made public that Metro Pro's founder, Chris Gough, had joined NWL as the promotion's general manager, helping oversee creative and talent relations.

A November 1 article in the Kansas City Business Journal reported that Baisden was planning to open future NWL promotions in other former regional hotbeds such as Austin and Houston; Portland and Seattle; Los Angeles and San Francisco; and Memphis and Nashville. In late November 2016, the company announced plans to open its NWL Training & Development Center in North Kansas City, headed by Rob Messerli and wrestler Derek Stone.

On April 12, 2018, Major Baisden announced that the NWL will cease all operations effective immediately.

== Signings ==
On September 28, 2016, the NWL announced its first signings to multi-year deals: 24-year-old twin brothers Logan and Sterling Riegel, two natives of Lee's Summit, Missouri, who will perform under the names Jet and Jax Royal, a.k.a. Royal Blood.

On October 5, 2016, the NWL signed 26-year-old Kevin Kwiatkowski to a multi-year contract, making the 328-pounder from south St. Louis County the first talent acquisition for NWL STL.

On October 12, 2016, the NWL announced that it had signed its first nationally known talent in 28-year-old Sam Udell.

On November 3, 2016, the NWL informed the media that it had reached a definitive agreement with Matt Jackson to acquire the assets of St. Louis Anarchy (SLA) Wrestling, a local promotion that will become part of NWL STL. Baisden said Jackson would stay on as NWL STL's general manager.

Veteran Midwest wrestler Jake Dirden was announced as signing with NWL on November 10, 2016. The following week, NWL KC publicized that it had signed another national star in Bolt Brady, an Austin, Texas, native who will compete in Kansas City under the moniker Blane Meeks.

== See also ==
- List of independent wrestling promotions in the United States
