= Metro Pro Wrestling =

American independent professional wrestling organization

- Acronym: MPW
- Founded: 2010
- Defunct: 2016
- Style: Professional wrestling
- Headquarters: Kansas City, Kansas
- Founder: Chris Gough
- Owner: Major Baisden
- Parent: National Wrasslin' League (NWL)
- Website: http://www.metrowrestling.com/

Metro Pro Wrestling (MPW) was an independent professional wrestling organization operating out of Kansas City, Kansas. The company began with its first television taping event on June 5, 2010, and has since put on monthly events which are all taped and aired on Time Warner Cable Metro Sports. Metro Pro Wrestling was founded in 2010 by Chris Gough. It became the first wrestling organization to be based out of Kansas City and hold monthly shows, in 25 years. The last promotion to call Kansas City home was Heart of America Sports Attractions (a.k.a. Central States Wrestling), which ran shows out of the historic Memorial Hall (site of the first Metro Pro TV taping).

== History ==
Metro Pro Wrestling was created in 2010 by former WWE employee Chris Gough, who works at Time Warner Cable Metro Sports as an anchor/producer in Kansas City, Missouri. The hour-long television program airs every Saturday night at 11 p.m. on Time Warner Cable Metro Sports in Kansas City in both standard definition and high definition. It also airs on Comcast, Knology of Kansas and Time Warner Nebraska. The show replays multiple times during the week.

Metro Pro Wrestling was a member of the National Wrestling Alliance (NWA), acting as the official Kansas City-area representative for the organization, from June 2010 to October 2012. During that time, Metro Pro housed Match #4 of the Seven Levels of Hate series between "Scrap Iron" Adam Pearce and Colt Cabana. Pearce defeated Cabana on July 21, 2012, to become a five-time NWA World Heavyweight Champion. It was the first time the NWA World Heavyweight Championship had changed hands in Kansas City since Ric Flair defeated Dusty Rhodes on September 17, 1981.

On December 3, 2016, Chris Gough announced that he had sold Metro Pro Wrestling to Major Baisden and the National Wrasslin' League.

On April 12, 2018, Major Baisden announced that the NWL will cease all operations effective immediately. Following the closing of the NWL it was announced by the old official Facebook page of Metro Pro Wrestling that it would return with a show on May 19, 2018. Many NWL roster alumni were announced for the show including a main event pitting former NWL Champion Jeremy Wyatt against Dak Draper in a two out of three falls match.

== Metro Pro Wrestling TV ==
Metro Pro Wrestling began an hour-long television series in September 2010. The program premieres each Saturday night at 11 p.m. CT on Time Warner Cable's Metro Sports, Comcast, Knology of Kansas in the Kansas City area. It also is simulcast on Time Warner Nebraska in Lincoln, Nebraska. The commentators for the program are play-by-play man, Dave Borchardt, and color man, Chris Gough. Stars who have been showcased on Metro Pro TV are Stevie Richards, Trevor Murdoch, Tommy Dreamer, Adam Pearce, Colt Cabana, Angel Medina, MsChif and Harley Race. The television program is taped one Saturday a month at Turner Recreation Center in Kansas City, Kansas. Four one-hour episodes are taped at each television taping event.

== Championships ==
Championship	Last champion	Previous	Date Won	Location
Metro Pro Heavyweight Championship	Jake Dirden	Mark Sterling	December 3, 2016	Kansas City, KS
Central States Championship	Redwing	Ace Steel	December 3, 2016	Kansas City, KS
Kansas Championship	Ace Steel	Steve Fender	June 4, 2016	Kansas City, KS
Metro Pro Tag Team Champions	The Commission	Kobra Kai Dojo	December 3, 2016	Kansas City, KS

== Roster ==
- Stevie Richards
- Trevor Murdoch
- Rhino
- Ricky Morton
- Jim Cornette
- Derek Stone
- Michael Strider
- Jeremy Wyatt
- Mark Sterling
- Matt Murphy
- Bull Schmitt
- Steven J. Girthy
- Tyler Cook
- A. C. H.
- "Showtime" Bradley Charles
- Lucy Mendez
- Stacey O'Brien
- Miss Natural
- Dan Walsh
- Jake Dirden
- Iceman
- Brett Young
- The Hooligans (Devin & Mason Cutter)
- Neil Diamond Cutter
- Jon West
- Der Oysleyz
- Jimmy Rockwell
- Zach Thompson
- Kwong
- Kraig Keesaman
- Pierre Abernathy
- Evan Gelistico
- Domino Rivera
- Maddog McDowell
- Jack Mecidol
- Pete Madden
- The Magic Man
- Simon Gotch (as Ryan Drago)
- Josh FX
- Hoodlum
- Ricky Cruz
- Davey Vega
- Mat Fitchett
- Michael Barry
- MsChif
- Rebelucha
- Steve Fender
- Tommy Dreamer
- Adam Pearce
- Colt Cabana
- Angel Medina
- Referee Brandon Schmitt
- Referee Michael Crase
- Referee Nick Chinn
- Referee Todd Countryman
- Ring Announcer Don Diablo

== See also ==
- List of independent wrestling promotions in the United States
