= Jake Atlas =

American professional wrestler

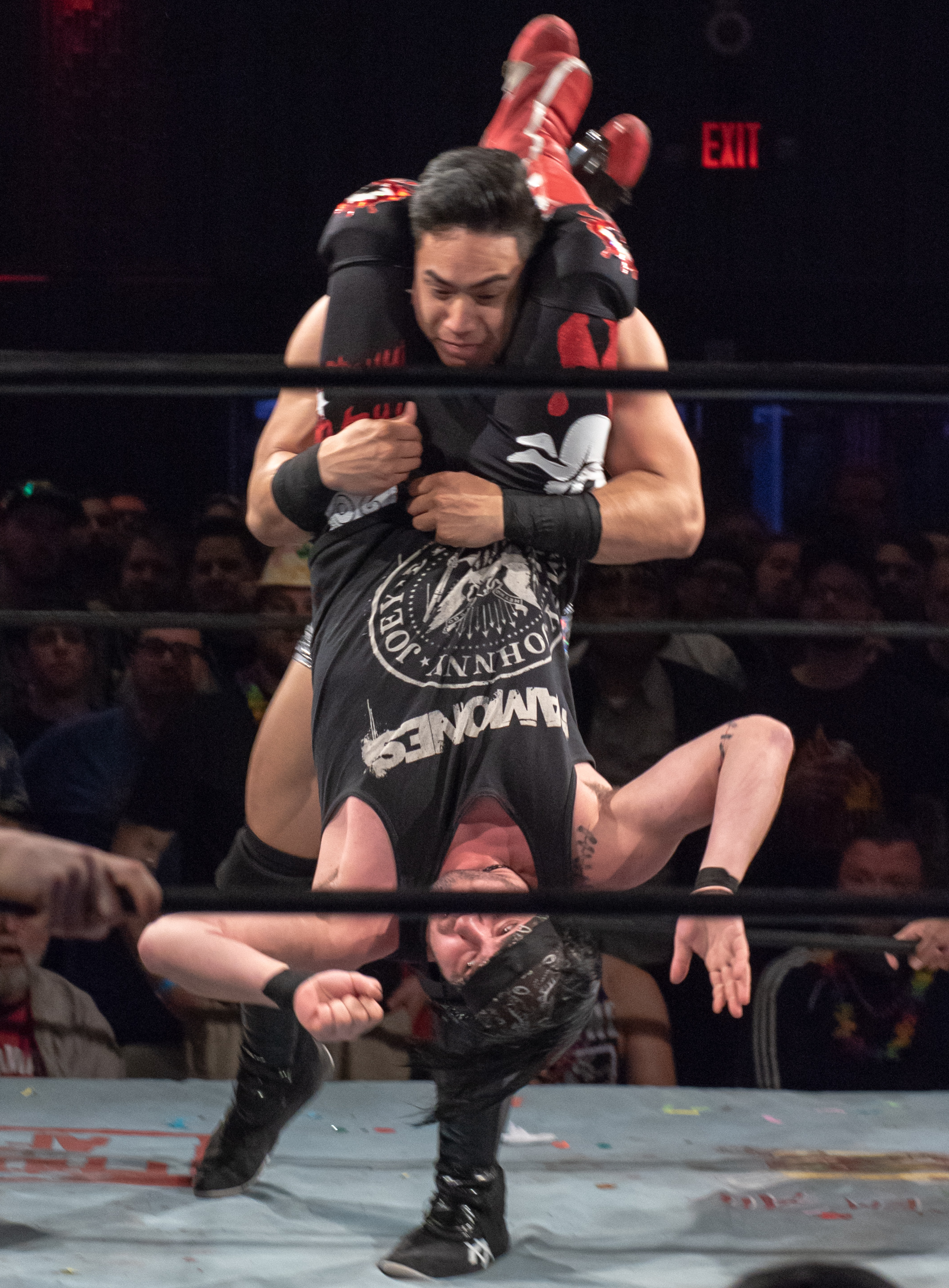
- Atlas (upper) in April 2019

Personal information
- Born: Kenny Sanchez Marquez; October 5, 1994 (age 32) El Monte, California, U.S.

Professional wrestling career
- Ring name: Jake Atlas
- Billed height: 5 ft 10 in (178 cm)
- Billed weight: 200 lb (91 kg)
- Trained by: Santino Bros Wrestling
- Debut: August 6, 2016
- Retired: January 7, 2022

Kenny Sanchez Marquez (born October 5, 1994), better known by his ring name Jake Atlas, is an American retired professional wrestler. He is known for his time in All Elite Wrestling (AEW) and WWE.

== Professional wrestling career ==
As a native resident of Los Angeles, Sanchez Marquez trained at the local Santino Bros. Wrestling Academy, making his in-ring debut on August 6, 2016, under the ring name Jake Atlas against Robby Phoenix, a match that he won via Disqualification. He went on to appear in numerous California promotions including Orange County Championship Wrestling, Empire Wrestling Federation, Baja Star's USA, All Pro Wrestling, Gold Rush Pro Wrestling and Championship Wrestling from Hollywood among several other promotions between 2016 and 2017. In some promotions, he competed in tag team matches with fellow wrestler Lucas Riley, calling themselves Aerial Instinct, due to their high-flying style of wrestling. During his career, Atlas won titles including Santino Bros. Wrestling's SBW Championship and All Pro Wrestling's Universal Heavyweight and Junior Heavyweight Championships.

Atlas' earliest association with WWE occurred as early as 2018, when he first appeared with Stephanie McMahon on an episode of Celebrity Undercover Boss. Atlas reportedly received $25,000 as a down payment for a house and was hired as an ambassador for the WWE. During July of that year, Atlas worked a "Be A Star" program in the Boston, Massachusetts area. On October 23, 2019, Atlas officially signed with WWE. On the April 1, 2020 episode of NXT, Atlas was defeated by Dexter Lumis in his debut. On April 12, Atlas was named a participant in the Interim NXT Cruiserweight Championship round-robin tournament. Atlas defeated Drake Maverick in his first match in the tournament and Tony Nese in his second match but lost to Kushida. After Maverick defeated Kushida on the May 20 episode of NXT, a Triple Threat match was set up between Maverick, Kushida and Atlas for the following week as all three men were tied at 2–1. Maverick won the match after pinning Atlas albeit in a controversial fashion. On the June 19 episode of 205 Live, Atlas made his debut on the brand defeating Gentleman Jack Gallagher. In October 2020 he would begin a feud with Santos Escobar over the Cruiserweight Championship but every time he was defeated. In January 2021, Atlas entered the Dusty Rhodes Tag Team Classic tournament, where he was paired with Isaiah "Swerve" Scott, but the two were eliminated from the tournament by the eventual winner MSK (Nash Carter and Wes Lee) and following the match, argued with one another. On August 6, 2021, Atlas was released from his WWE contract.

On September 3, 2021, it was announced that Atlas would appear at Ring of Honor's Death Before Dishonor XVIII in a special showcase match against fellow recent WWE release Taylor Rust. At the event, Atlas was defeated by Rust. Not long after, Atlas announced his retirement from professional wrestling, citing mental health reasons. On the December 28, 2021 taping of AEW Dark, Atlas came out of retirement and made his in ring return and AEW debut defeating Serpentico. He had his televised debut on the January 7 edition of AEW Rampage, where he lost to Adam Cole. During the match he suffered a knee injury. Atlas was released from AEW following a May 2022 domestic violence arrest.

== Personal life ==
Sanchez Marquez is openly gay. He is of Mexican descent.

On May 23, 2022, Sanchez Marquez was arrested in Orange County, Florida and charged with domestic battery. The charges were dropped on June 28.

== Championships and accomplishments ==
- All Pro Wrestling
  - APW Junior Heavyweight Championship (1 time)
  - APW Universal Heavyweight Championship (1 time)
- PCW Ultra
  - PCW Ultra Light Heavyweight Championship (1 time)
- Pro Wrestling Illustrated
  - Ranked No. 169 of the top 500 singles wrestlers in the PWI 500 in 2020
- Santino Bros. Wrestling
  - SBW Championship (1 time)
