= PCW Ultra =

Independent professional wrestling promotion in Los Angeles, California

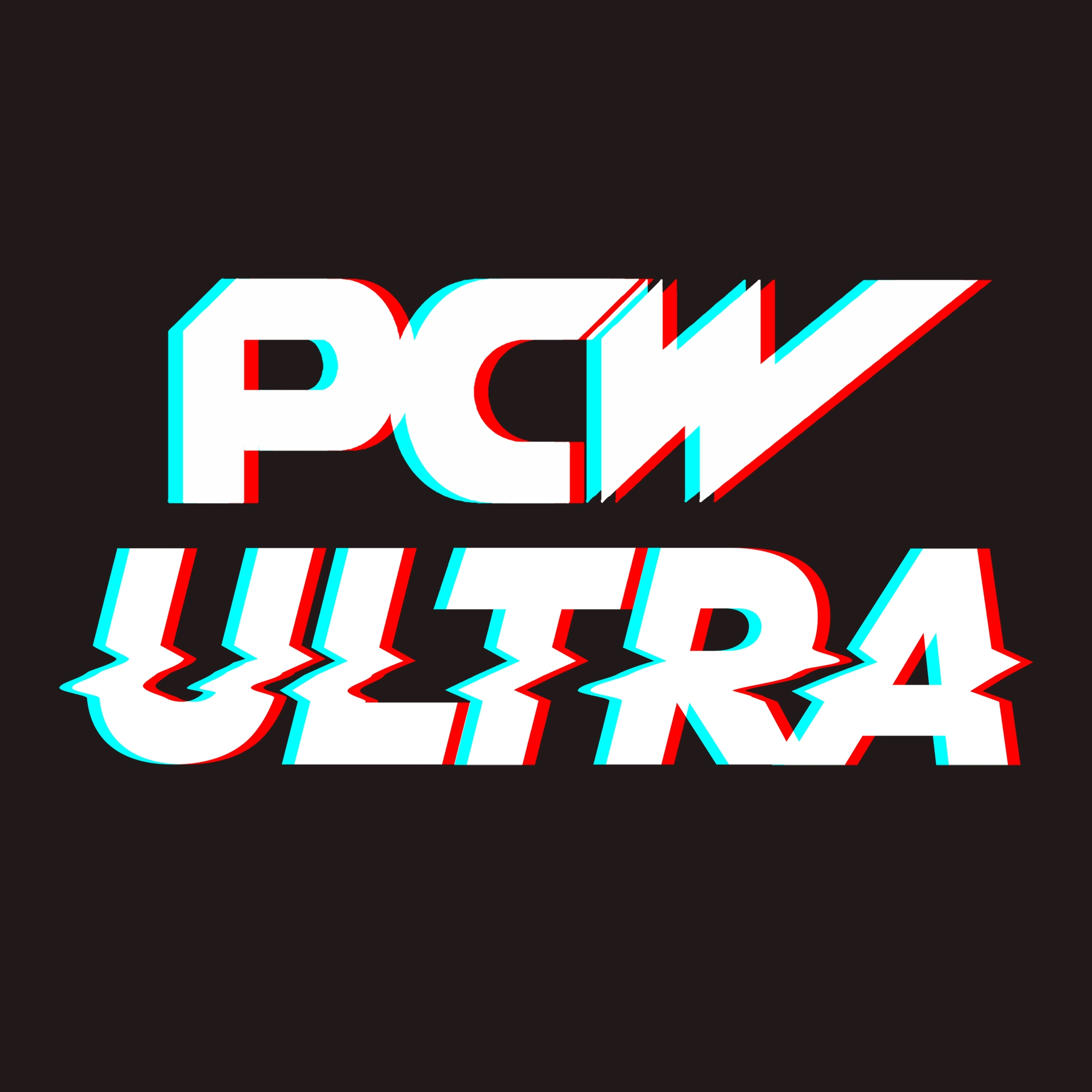
- Founded: 2016
- Headquarters: Los Angeles, California
- Founders: Josef Samael; Mike Scharnagl
- Formerly: Pacific Coast Wrestling
- Website: www.pcwultra.com

PCW Ultra is an American independent professional wrestling promotion based in Los Angeles, California. The company predominantly features several different styles of professional wrestling such as hardcore wrestling, lucha libre, and catch wrestling. PCW Ultra was founded in 2016 by former NWA Heavyweight Champion and current MLW wrestlers Josef Samael and Mike Scharnagl under the name Pacific Coast Wrestling.

PCW Ultra's roster consists of wrestlers and figures such as independent freelancers, signed talent, and retired legends.

== History ==
=== Pacific Coast Wrestling (PCW) ===
PCW Ultra was founded in January 2016 by Joseph Cabibbo (known professionally as Josef Samael) and Mike Scharnagl under the name Pacific Coast Wrestling (PCW). In an interview with Sports Illustrated Scharnagl talked about the formation of PCW Ultra, stating that he attended a wrestling show but felt that the show was lacking. Upon discovering the cost to establish a new promotion, he decided to create one right away. He balanced his PCW responsibilities with selling car care products. Samael has over two decades of experience as a wrestler who used the ring name The Sheik as a tribute to Ed Farhat. The promotion features several different styles of professional wrestling such as hardcore wrestling, lucha libre, and catch wrestling. Longtime wrestler Kevin Sullivan, known as “The Taskmaster” from his time in WCW, works behind-the-scenes with Josef Samael with the promotion as it continues to grow and expand its reach beyond the west coast.

In an interview with the podcast "Keeping it 100 with Konnan", Samael talks about the influence Sullivan has had on PCW Ultra's booking, and how Sullivan has taught him how to book, promote and format a show. WWE Hall of Famer Jake "The Snake" Roberts also helped teach Samael. PCW Ultra's events are also featured on FITE TV PPV.

=== Event history ===
In 2021 PCW Ultra made its post-pandemic return to wrestling and held its All Systems Go! event from ILWU Memorial Hall in Wilmington, California. The event featured matches from wrestlers like JTG, Steve Madison, Viva Van, The Bloodhunter with Kevin Sullivan, 2 Cold Scorpio, Alex Hammerstone, Alex Kane, Warbeast (Sheik, Fatu) and more. WWE Hall of Famer Ron Simmons also appeared at the event.

In 2020 PCW Ultra only held one event throughout the year out of the ILWU Memorial Hall in Wilmington, California due to the pandemic. January 10, 2020 PCW ULTRA held its Annual Anniversary 2K20 event featuring matches from wrestlers like Chris Masters, Killer Kross, TJ Perkins. Ring of Honor, Sumie Sakai, The Bloodhunter with Kevin Sullivan, Sabu, Jake Atlas, Mil Muertes, Alex Hammerstone, Warbeast (Sheik and Fatu), Outlaws Inc (Eddie Kingston and Homicide) and more.

In 2019 PCW Ultra held several events throughout the year out of the ILWU Memorial Hall in Wilmington, California. Some of these include Into the Void, which featured matches from wrestlers like Alex Hammerstone, Sumie Sakai, Viva Van, Brian Pillman Jr., Jacob Fatu, Eddie Kingston, Jake Atlas, Daga, Sheik, Homicide, Mil Muertes, WWE Hall of Famer Savio Vega, and more.

PCW Ultra also held its event No Quarter event on August 9, which featured matches from wrestlers like Mil Muertes, Dan Maff, Daga, Puma King, Matt Sydal, Brian Pillman Jr., Jake Atlas, TJ Perkins, Sumie Sakai, Tessa Blanchard, Warbeast (Sheik and Fatu), Outlawz Inc. (Eddie Kingston and Homicide), WWE Hall of Famer Kelly Kelly and more.

On June 14, 2019, PCW Ultra held its Mind Crawler event which featured matches from wrestlers like, TJ Perkins, Adam Brooks, Jake Atlas, Brian Pillman Jr., Mil Muertes, Sami Callihan, Tessa Blanchard, Jordynne Grace, Trey Miguel, Warbeast (Sheik and Fatu), The Lucha Brothers (Pentagon Jr. and Rey Fenix) and more. On March 29, 2019, PCW Ultra held its annual event Wrestle Summit which included wrestlers from different promotions like All Elite Wrestling, Impact Wrestling, Major League Wrestling, PCW Ultra, Defy Wrestling, and The Wrestling Revolver. the summit featured matches from wrestlers like Trey Miguel, Adam Brooks, Caleb Konley, Kikutaro, Tessa Blanchard, Daga, Taya Valkyrie, John Morrison, Sami Callihan, Brian Cage, Jake Atlas, Wes Lee, Warbeast (Sheik and Fatu), Nash Carter, Mil Muertes, Isaiah Scott and more.

On October 26, 2018, PCW Ultra held its Possessed event from ILWU Memorial Hall in Wilmington, California. The event featured matches from wrestlers like Jake Atlas, Chris Bey, Marko Stunt, Alexander Hammerstone, Daga, Brody King, Puma King, Tessa Blanchard, Priscilla Kelly. Warbeast (Sheik and Fatu), Abyss, Sinn Bodhi, Isaiah Scott, Darby Allin, Pentagon Jr., P. J. Black and more.

=== Events glossary ===
Event	Date	Location	Notes
All Systems Go!	October 22, 2021	Wilmington, California	Notes
Anniversary 2K20	January 10, 2020	Wilmington, California	Notes
Wrestle Summit 2 (Day 2)	December 1, 2019	Seattle, Washington	Notes
Wrestle Summit 2 (Day 1)	November 30, 2019	Seattle, Washington	Notes
Into the Void	October 18, 2019	Wilmington, California	Notes
No Quarter	August 9, 2019	Wilmington, California	Notes
Mind Crawler	June 14, 2019	Los Angeles, California	Notes
Wrestle Summit	March 29, 2019	Los Angeles, California	Notes
Anniversary 2K19	January 18, 2019	Wilmington, California	Notes
Believe	December 7, 2018	Wilmington, California	Notes
Possessed	October 26, 2018	Wilmington, California	Notes
Vision Quest	September 7, 2018	Wilmington, California	Notes
Sound the Alarm	July 27, 2018	Wilmington, California	Notes
Opposites Attack	June 8, 2018	Wilmington, California	Notes
May the 4th	May 4, 2018	Wilmington, California	Notes
Tuff Luck	March 16, 2018	Wilmington, California	Notes
Anniversary 2K18	January 19, 2018	Wilmington, California	Notes
Refuse to Lose	December 1, 2017	Wilmington, California	Notes
Demonized	October 6, 2017	Wilmington, California	Notes
Young Guns II	September 2, 2017	Long Beach, California	Notes
Second to None	July 28, 2017	Wilmington, California	Notes
Showdown	June 2, 2017	Los Angeles, California	Notes
Young Guns	April 22, 2017	Long Beach, California	Notes
High Tide	March 24, 2017	Wilmington, California	Notes
Fantasm	January 20, 2017	Wilmington, California	Notes
Clear the Way	November 12, 2016	Torrance, California	Notes
Title Wave	August 20, 2016	Torrance, California	Notes
Relentless	June 4, 2016	Torrance, California	Notes
The Shining	March 26, 2016	Torrance, California	Notes
Release the Kraken	January 9, 2016	Torrance, California	Notes

== Championships ==
Championship	Current Champion(s)	Date won	Location	Notes
Ultra Heavyweight Championship	Galeno del Mal		Wilmington, California	defeated Titus Alexander and Calvin Tankman at SCENE NOT HEARD - winning vacant title due to Fatu signing to WWE
Ultra Light Championship	Bryan Keith	April 22, 2023	Wilmington, California	Defeated Myron Reed at Saturday Night Special
Ultra Tag Team Championship	Vacant	January 20, 2017	Wilmington, California	Vacant due to Jacob Fatu Leaving as he was signed by WWE
Ultra Women Championship	Zamaya	October 22, 2021	Wilmington, California	Defeated Viva Van

== Roster ==
PCW Ultra's roster consists of wrestlers and figures such as independent freelancers, signed talent, and retired legends.

=== Fighting Athletes & Managers ===
Name	Debut	Notes	Name	Debut	Notes	Name	Debut	Notes	Name	Debut	Notes
A. C. H.	December 7, 2018	Notes	JTG	October 22, 2021	Notes	Matt Sydal	August 9, 2019	Notes	Sinn Bodhi	October 26, 2018	Notes
Adam Brooks	March 29, 2019	Notes	Joe Graves	January 9, 2016	Notes	Mecha Wolf	August 20, 2016	Notes	Steve Madison	October 22, 2021	Notes
Allie Katch	Oct 29th 2021	Notes	Luchasaurus	March 27, 2020	Notes	Mil Muertes	March 29, 2019	Notes	Sumie Sakai	August 9, 2019	Notes
Artemis Spencer	March 29, 2019	Notes	Super Panda	March 27, 2020	Notes	The Natural Classics	October 18, 2019	Notes	Swoggle	March 16, 2018	Notes
Bestia 666	July 28, 2017	Notes	Juicy Finau	October 22, 2021	Notes	1 Called Manders	October 22, 2021	Notes	TJ Perkins	January 9, 2016	Notes
The Blood Hunter	January 10, 2020	Notes	Kikutaro	June 2, 2017	Notes	The Oracle	November 12, 2016	Notes	Taya Valkyrie	December 7, 2018	Notes
Brian Cage	August 20, 2016	Notes	Karrion Kross	January 10, 2020	Notes	Puma King	September 7, 2018	Notes	Tessa Blanchard	May 4, 2018	Notes
Brian Pillman Jr	June 14, 2019	Notes	Slice Boogie	August 9, 2019	Notes	Reno Scum	June 4, 2016	Notes	Timothy Thatcher	January 9, 2016	Notes
Chris Masters	January 10, 2020	Notes	Danny Limelight	June 4, 2016	Notes	Rey Horus	September 7, 2018	Notes	2 Cold Scorpio	October 22, 2021	Notes
Daga	June 10, 2017	Notes	Lil Cholo	December 7, 2018	Notes	Ruby Raze	January 10, 2020	Notes	Trey Miguel	March 29, 2019	Notes
Diamante	September 7, 2018	Notes	Los Luchas	August 20, 2016	Notes	Sami Callihan	March 24, 2017	Notes	Vipress	March 27, 2020	Notes
Dragon Lee	June 8, 2018	Notes	Pentagon Jr	August 20, 2016	Notes	Schaff	June 14, 2019	Notes	Zack Sabre Jr	December 1, 2017	Notes
Eddie Kingston	September 7, 2018	Notes	Rey Fenix	August 20, 2016	Notes	Shawn Donovan	March 29, 2019	Notes	Zeda Zhang	December 9, 2021	Notes
Homicide	May 4, 2018	Notes	Matt Cross	July 27, 2018	Notes	Dan Maff	March 29, 2019	Notes			

=== Legends ===
Name	Name	Name	Name
Abyss	The Great Muta	Mick Foley	Sabu
Road Warrior Animal	Haku	Mil Mascaras	The Sandman
Billy Gunn	Jake The Snake Roberts	Ricky Steamboat	Savio Vega
Christy Hemme	Kelly Kelly	Rob Van Dam	Stan Hansen
Gail Kim	Kevin Sullivan	Ron Simmons	Terry Funk

=== Alumni ===
Ring Name	Ring Name	Ring Name	Ring Name
Isaiah Scott	Martin Stone	Jeff Cobb	Angel Garza
Brody King	Flip Gordan	Alicia Warrington	P. J. Black
Lio Rush	Stephan Bonnar	Rachel Ellering	Jake Atlas
Keith Lee	Chelsea Green	Jay White	John Morrison

=== Staff ===
Name	Role
Dan Master	Ring Announcer
Dom Vitalli	Director of Communications
Christian Cole	Color Commentator
Todd Kenely	Play by Play Commentator
