= Uncensored (1996) =

1996 World Championship Wrestling pay-per-view event

- Promotional poster featuring Lex Luger, Randy Savage and Randy Anderson
- Promotion: World Championship Wrestling
- Date: March 24, 1996
- City: Tupelo, Mississippi
- Venue: Tupelo Coliseum
- Attendance: 9,000
- Buy rate: 250,000
- Tagline: Everything you've wanted to see...plus the stuff you haven't thought of yet!

Pay-per-view chronology
← Previous; SuperBrawl VI	Next → Slamboree

Uncensored chronology
← Previous; 1995	Next → 1997

The 1996 Uncensored was the second Uncensored professional wrestling pay-per-view (PPV) event produced by World Championship Wrestling (WCW). The event took place on March 24, 1996, from the Tupelo Coliseum in Tupelo, Mississippi.

Seven matches were contested at the pay-per-view. The major attraction of the event was the main event, a Doomsday Cage match pitting Hulk Hogan and Randy Savage against the Alliance to End Hulkamania, a group consisting of Ric Flair, Arn Anderson and The Dungeon of Doom. Hogan and Savage won the match. Another important match on the event was a Chicago Street Fight between Road Warriors and the team of Sting and Booker T. Sting and Booker T won. Only one championship was defended at the event. Konnan successfully defended the WCW United States Heavyweight Championship against Eddie Guerrero.

== Storylines ==
The event featured wrestlers from pre-existing scripted feuds and storylines. Wrestlers portrayed villains, heroes, or less distinguishable characters in the scripted events that built tension and culminated in a wrestling match or series of matches.

== Event ==
Other on-screen personnel
Role:	Name:
Commentators	Tony Schiavone
Commentators	Bobby Heenan
Commentators	Dusty Rhodes
Interviewers	Gene Okerlund
Interviewers	Lee Marshall
Ring announcers	David Penzer
Ring announcers	Michael Buffer (Main event)
Referees	Randy Anderson
Referees	Nick Patrick

Diamond Dallas Page was originally scheduled to face Johnny B. Badd for the WCW World Television Championship, but Badd had lost the title to Lex Luger prior to the event and left the company shortly thereafter. Instead The Booty Man took Badd's place, including Page's former valet Kimberly, that had sided with Badd and now became known as "The Booty Babe". Page wrestled under stipulations that if he won, he would regain Kimberly's services as manager as well as the money he spent. If he lost the match, he would have to retire from professional wrestling. The Booty Man would earn the victory against Page.

The main event Doomsday Cage match was a stacked cage with several compartments, Randy Savage and Hulk Hogan were forced to fight their way down through the cage, starting on the roof. In the end Savage pinned Ric Flair after Lex Luger punched Flair with a loaded glove. During the match, The Booty Man interfered and gave the Mega Powers frying pans to use as weapons.

== Results ==
No.	Results	Stipulations	Times
1^{ME}	Mr. J.L. defeated Dean Malenko	Singles match	03:20
2^{ME}	Jim Duggan defeated Big Bubba Rogers	Singles match	03:20
3^{ME}	Dick Slater (with Col. Robert Parker) defeated Alex Wright	Singles match	01:55
4^{ME}	The Steiner Brothers (Rick Steiner and Scott Steiner) vs. The Nasty Boys (Brian Knobs and Jerry Sags) ended in a no-contest	Tag team match	05:19
5	Konnan (c) defeated Eddie Guerrero	Singles match for the WCW United States Heavyweight Championship	18:27
6	The Belfast Bruiser defeated Lord Steven Regal by disqualification	Singles match	17:33
7	Col. Robert Parker defeated Madusa	Singles match	03:47
8	The Booty Man (with The Booty Babe) defeated Diamond Dallas Page	I Quit Wrestling match Since Page lost, he was forced to retire. Had Page won, he would have reacquired The Booty Babe's services as manager and regained his earnings. (Note: Only Page's career was on the line in this match.)	16:00
9	The Giant (with Jimmy Hart) defeated Loch Ness	Singles match to determine the #1 contender to the WCW World Heavyweight Championship	02:34
10	Sting and Booker T defeated The Road Warriors (Hawk and Animal)	Chicago Street Fight	29:33
11	The Mega Powers (Hulk Hogan and Randy Savage) defeated The Alliance to end Hulkamania (Ric Flair, Arn Anderson, Meng, The Barbarian, Lex Luger, The Taskmaster, Z-Gangsta and The Ultimate Solution) (with Woman, Miss Elizabeth and Jimmy Hart)	Doomsday Cage match (Note: Prior to the start of the match, Brian Pillman was referenced by announcer Tony Schiavone as a participant. However, he parted ways with the company less than a day after SuperBrawl VI a month prior.)	25:16
(c) / – the champion(s) heading into the match; ME / – the match was broadcast prior to the pay-per-view on Main Event
