= Uncensored (1997) =

1997 World Championship Wrestling pay-per-view event

- Promotional Poster
- Promotion: World Championship Wrestling
- Date: March 16, 1997
- City: Charleston, South Carolina
- Venue: North Charleston Coliseum
- Attendance: 9,285
- Buy rate: 325,000
- Tagline: You'll Never See It Coming!

Pay-per-view chronology
← Previous; SuperBrawl VII	Next → Spring Stampede

Uncensored chronology
← Previous; 1996	Next → 1998

The 1997 Uncensored was the third Uncensored professional wrestling pay-per-view (PPV) event produced by World Championship Wrestling (WCW). The event took place on March 16, 1997 from the North Charleston Coliseum in Charleston, South Carolina.

The main event was a triangle elimination match between Team nWo (Hollywood Hogan, Randy Savage, Kevin Nash and Scott Hall) (with Dennis Rodman), Team Piper (Roddy Piper, Chris Benoit, Steve McMichael and Jeff Jarrett) and Team WCW (Lex Luger, The Giant and Scott Steiner).

The event generated 325,000 ppv buys.

== Storylines ==
The event featured wrestlers from pre-existing scripted feuds and storylines. Wrestlers portrayed villains, heroes, or less distinguishable characters in the scripted events that built tension and culminated in a wrestling match or series of matches.

The main event was conceived following the events of SuperBrawl on February 23. At the event, Hall and Nash were scheduled to defend their WCW Tag Team Championship against Luger and The Giant. Luger, however, was injured and failed to meet a deadline set by WCW Vice President and nWo manager Eric Bischoff to get medically cleared before he left the building on the February 17 edition of WCW Monday Nitro, which turned the match into a handicap match. Luger did, however, show up at SuperBrawl and compete in the match, which he and Giant won after Luger forced Nash to submit to the Torture Rack.

The next night on Nitro, Bischoff announced that the result of the tag match was being vacated due to Luger failing to meet his deadline and ordered Luger and Giant to return the belts to Hall and Nash. Luger responded by making a challenge on behalf of WCW, where the two sides would face off in a match at Uncensored with the nWo's future at stake; Bischoff accepted in his role as executive vice president of WCW.

Almost immediately after he did, Harvey Schiller, the then-president of Turner Sports, came out to confront Bischoff over a series of actions he had taken since the year began, including firing referee Randy Anderson and stripping the Steiner Brothers of the WCW Tag Team Championship after Souled Out in January. Schiller suspended Bischoff and removed his executive power.

Later, the match was modified to allow a third team to participate. In the main event of SuperBrawl, Roddy Piper faced Hogan in a rematch of their encounter at Starrcade in December 1996, but this time with the world championship on the line. After Hogan defeated Piper with assistance from Savage, who joined the nWo as a result, Piper decided that he wanted another match against Hogan and decided to form his own team for Uncensored. So on the March 3 episode of Nitro, Piper staged a series of "exhibitions" to select his team. After six men, which included three WCW Power Plant graduates (one of which would later be WWE's Luther Reigns), auditioned, Piper selected actor Craig Mally, stunt coordinator Layton Morrison, and the largely inactive John Tenta to form his unit. However, on the March 10 edition of Nitro, Ric Flair offered up Chris Benoit, Steve McMichael, and Jeff Jarrett, his Four Horsemen teammates, to Piper and he agreed to replace his original teammates with them.

Team WCW consisted of Luger, The Giant, and The Steiner Brothers, with team nWo consisting of Hogan, Savage, Hall, and Nash and Team Piper composed of Piper and the aforementioned three Horsemen. Each team had their own reward for winning the match. If Team nWo won, they would get the ability to challenge for any WCW championship whenever they wanted. If Team WCW won, every member of the nWo would be suspended from wrestling for WCW for three years and all of their championships would be returned to WCW. If Team Piper won, he would receive another match against Hogan for the WCW World Heavyweight Championship, to be contested at a time and a place of his choosing and taking place inside a steel cage.

In the undercard, the nWo had been involved in intertwining feuds over both the United States and Cruiserweight championships over the course of the previous few months, with both feuds involving Syxx. The nWo had stolen the United States Championship from reigning champion Ric Flair in the fall, with The Giant claiming the title for himself. WCW did not recognize the title change, however, and vacated the championship (Flair, in real life, injured his shoulder and was forced out of action). Eddie Guerrero and Diamond Dallas Page faced off at Starrcade in December 1996 in a tournament final, which Guerrero won after Hall, Nash, and Syxx interfered. After the match, the nWo beat up Guerrero and Syxx took possession of the title belt; Guerrero beat Syxx to reclaim possession of the belt in a ladder match at nWo Souled Out in January. Syxx then set his sights on Dean Malenko after he defeated Ultimo Dragon at January's Clash of the Champions event to regain the Cruiserweight Championship he had lost to Dragon at Starrcade. The two met at SuperBrawl in a match that ended in controversial fashion. Syxx, who had stolen the title belt from Malenko some time earlier, tried to use it to hit the champion. Guerrero charged out from the locker room and grabbed onto the belt, trying to get it away from Syxx. At the same time, Malenko and referee Mark Curtis tried to pull Syxx away from Guerrero. In the confusion that ensued, Syxx pulled the belt away from Guerrero and, just as Curtis began to admonish Guerrero for interfering, struck Malenko with it. Since Curtis did not see Syxx hit Malenko with the belt, and despite Guerrero's protests, Syxx was able to score the pin and win the title. Malenko blamed Guerrero for his loss and challenged him to put his title up at Uncensored.

== Event ==
Other on-screen personnel
Role:	Name:
Commentators	Tony Schiavone
Commentators	Bobby Heenan
Commentators	Dusty Rhodes
Commentators	Mike Tenay
Interviewer	Gene Okerlund
Ring announcers	David Penzer
Ring announcers	Michael Buffer
Referees	Randy Anderson
Referees	Mark Curtis
Referees	Mickie Jay
Referees	Nick Patrick

Before the first match of the night, Hall, Nash, and Syxx attacked Rick Steiner and injured him severely enough that he was taken out of the main event match.

In their match for the United States Championship, Malenko defeated Guerrero to win his first United States title and his fourth singles title since joining WCW in 1995. Syxx once again played a role in the outcome of the match and tried once again to steal the title belt, but dropped a camera he was carrying; after Guerrero stopped Syxx, Malenko struck him with the camera and knocked him out to pin him.

=== Main event ===
The main event match was a battle royal. conducted under the following rules. Three men, one from each team, would start in the ring. After five minutes, three more men would enter for each team. After two more minutes, the next three men would enter, and after that the remaining competitors would enter after a final two minute interval. A wrestler could be eliminated by being thrown over the top rope and touching the floor with both feet, or by either being pinned or forced to submit.

The Giant was eliminated first when he accidentally fell over the top rope while trying to perform a splash on Hall. Hall then knocked Jarrett and McMichael out of the ring, and Nash eliminated Steiner with a boot to the face. Piper was eliminated by Hogan, who got an assist from Dennis Rodman who pulled down the top rope as Piper was whipped into them. Benoit was then eliminated after an Outsiders Edge by Hall, leaving Luger alone against all four members of Team nWo.

Nash looked to finish Luger off by hitting him with the Jackknife Powerbomb, but Luger backdropped him and began to rally. After hitting a series of clotheslines and punches on Team nWo, Luger lifted Savage up for the Torture Rack. After Savage submitted, Luger knocked down Hall and, as Nash was slowly getting to his feet, charged at him and clotheslined him over the top rope. Luger then gave Hall a reverse atomic drop, then put him in the Torture Rack and forced him to submit to even the sides.

As Luger went to work on Hogan, Nash climbed up on the apron and grabbed the attention of referee Randy Anderson. Rodman produced a spray can from his coat and handed it to Savage as Hogan was put in the Torture Rack. Savage entered the ring and struck Luger in the head, knocking him unconscious and enabling Hogan to pin him and win the match for the nWo.

=== Immediate aftermath ===
After the match, Rodman joined Hogan in attacking Luger and spray painted "NWO" on his back. However, as the nWo was leaving the ringside area, Sting rappelled into the ring from the rafters. He then proceeded to attack Hall, Nash, and Savage with a baseball bat, and laid out all three men with his Scorpion Death Drop. Sting then pointed the bat at Hogan, challenging him to come into the ring. Hogan obliged, and Sting attacked him as the show went off the air.

== Results ==
No.	Results	Stipulations	Times
1^{D}	Ice Train defeated Maxx	Singles match	—
2	Dean Malenko defeated Eddie Guerrero (c)	No Disqualification match for the WCW United States Heavyweight Championship	19:14
3	Ultimate Dragon (with Sonny Onoo) defeated Psychosis	Singles match	13:17
4	Glacier defeated Mortis (with James Vanderberg)	Singles match	09:04
5	Buff Bagwell defeated Scotty Riggs	Strap match	12:27
6	Harlem Heat (Booker T and Stevie Ray) (with Sister Sherri) defeated The Public Enemy (Rocco Rock and Johnny Grunge)	Texas Tornado match	13:17
7	Prince Iaukea (c) defeated Rey Misterio Jr.	Singles match for the WCW World Television Championship	15:00
8	nWo (Hollywood Hogan, Randy Savage, Kevin Nash and Scott Hall) (with Dennis Rodman) defeated Team Piper (Roddy Piper, Chris Benoit, Steve McMichael and Jeff Jarrett) and Team WCW (Lex Luger, The Giant and Scott Steiner)	Triangle Elimination match	19:22
(c) / – the champion(s) heading into the match; D / – this was a dark match

=== Triangle match eliminations ===
Elimination no.	Wrestler	Team	Eliminated by	Elimination move	Time
1	The Giant	Team WCW	himself	Fell over top rope while attempting move on Scott Hall	04:55
2	Jeff Jarrett	Team Piper	Kevin Nash	Over the top rope via Clothesline	09:21
3	Steve McMichael	Team Piper	Scott Hall	Over the top rope via Back Body Drop	09:45
4	Scott Steiner	Team WCW	Kevin Nash	Over the top rope	10:16
5	Roddy Piper	Team Piper	Hollywood Hogan	Over the top rope when Dennis Rodman pulled the rope down	10:55
6	Chris Benoit	Team Piper	Scott Hall and Kevin Nash	Over the top rope	16:27
7	Randy Savage	nWo	Lex Luger	Torture Rack	18:23
8	Kevin Nash	nWo	Lex Luger	Over the top rope	18:31
9	Scott Hall	nWo	Lex Luger	Torture Rack	18:45
10	Lex Luger	Team WCW	Hollywood Hogan	Pinned after Savage hit Luger in the head with a can of spray paint handed off by Dennis Rodman	19:22
Survivor:	Hollywood Hogan (Team nWo)				
