= Uncensored =

Uncensored refers to the absence of censorship

Uncensored may also refer to:

- WCW Uncensored, annual professional wrestling event
- Uncensored (Daron Jones album)
- Uncensored (The Bob & Tom Show album)
- Uncensored (film), a 1942 British World War II drama
- Philadelphia International Records, a record label previously known as Uncensored Records
