= WCW Uncensored =

Professional wrestling pay-per-view series

Uncensored
- Promotions: World Championship Wrestling
- First event: Uncensored (1995)
- Last event: Uncensored (2000)
- Event gimmick: Each match on the card was unsanctioned

Uncensored was an annual professional wrestling pay-per-view (PPV) event from World Championship Wrestling (WCW) held in the month of March from 1995 through 2000. It was replaced by Greed in 2001.

The recurring concept of Uncensored was that it was an event that, in storylines, the (fictional) WCW Board of Directors had washed their hands of. Thus, each match on the card was ostensibly unsanctioned, meaning they were not subject to the normal rules of WCW-sanctioned wrestling matches. In reality, it was a normally-booked WCW show, albeit one with a tendency to feature more gimmick matches than usual. This notion, however, was downplayed during the last few years that it was part of the WCW PPV schedule. Hulk Hogan was featured in the main event of all six versions of the event. In 2014, All WCW pay-per-views were made available on the WWE Network.

== Events ==
WCW/nWo co-branded event

Event	Date	City	Venue	Main Event
Uncensored (1995)	March 19, 1995	Tupelo, Mississippi.	Tupelo Coliseum	Hulk Hogan vs. Vader in a Leather Strap match
Uncensored (1996)	March 24, 1996	Tupelo, Mississippi.	Tupelo Coliseum	Hulk Hogan and Randy Savage vs. Ric Flair, Arn Anderson, Meng, The Barbarian, Lex Luger, The Taskmaster, Z-Gangsta and The Ultimate Solution in a Doomsday Cage match
Uncensored (1997)	March 16, 1997	North Charleston, South Carolina	North Charleston Coliseum	nWo (Hollywood Hogan, Randy Savage, Kevin Nash and Scott Hall) vs. Team Piper (Roddy Piper, Chris Benoit, Steve McMichael and Jeff Jarrett) vs. Team WCW (Lex Luger, The Giant and Scott Steiner) in a Triangle Elimination match
Uncensored (1998)	March 15, 1998	Mobile, Alabama	Mobile Civic Center	Hollywood Hogan vs. Randy Savage in a Steel Cage match
Uncensored (1999)	March 14, 1999	Louisville, Kentucky	Freedom Hall	Hollywood Hogan (c) vs. Ric Flair in a Barbed Wire Steel Cage match for the WCW World Heavyweight Championship
Uncensored (2000)	March 19, 2000	Miami, Florida	American Airlines Arena	Hulk Hogan vs. Ric Flair in a Yappapi Indian Strap match
(c) – refers to the champion(s) heading into the match

== Reception ==
A 1995 review in Wrestling Bad Guys called the debut episode of WCW Uncensored "one of the most disappointing pay-per-view events ever held".
