= Fingerpoke of Doom =

Professional wrestling incident

- The Fingerpoke of Doom: Hollywood Hogan taps Kevin Nash on the chest while referee Billy Silverman looks on
- Promotion: WCW
- Date: January 4, 1999
- City: Atlanta, Georgia
- Venue: Georgia Dome
- Attendance: 38,809

The nickname Fingerpoke of Doom refers to an incident in American professional wrestling which occurred on January 4, 1999, at the Georgia Dome in Atlanta, Georgia, during a live broadcast of WCW Monday Nitro, the flagship television program of World Championship Wrestling (WCW).

The incident occurred during the main event of Nitro, featuring WCW World Heavyweight champion Kevin Nash, who was the leader of the Wolfpac faction of the New World Order (nWo), and Hollywood Hogan, the leader of the Hollywood faction of the nWo, with whom Nash and his group had been feuding since April 1998 when the original faction split up and Hogan had retired from wrestling. The Wolfpac faction were babyfaces (heroes) while the Hollywood faction were heels (villains), as was the original nWo. The match saw Hogan poke Nash in the chest with his index finger, prompting Nash to theatrically throw himself onto the mat and allow Hogan to pin him; the victory marked the reunion of both nWo factions into one villainous group.

Earlier in the same broadcast, WCW commentator Tony Schiavone gave away the results of their Monday Night War rival World Wrestling Federation (WWF)'s Raw is War (which was taped six days earlier, and aired at the same time Nitro was being broadcast live), revealing that former WCW wrestler Mick Foley was set to win the WWF Championship. Although this revelation was meant to deter Nitro viewers from switching to Raw is War, it instead reportedly prompted 600,000 viewers to change channels in order to see Foley's victory, with most viewers only tuning back in to Nitro when there were five minutes left in the broadcast, in which the Fingerpoke of Doom occurred.

The Fingerpoke of Doom was so named both for Nash's deliberate over-sell of the finger poke and the negative ramifications the incident had for WCW as a whole, with some wrestling journalists crediting it as the beginning of the company's ultimate downfall and loss of the Monday Night War.

== Setup ==
The match held during the ongoing NWO storyline was directly related to a controversial main event that occurred at World Championship Wrestling (WCW)'s pay-per-view event Starrcade in December 1998, during which Kevin Nash pinned Goldberg to win the WCW World Heavyweight Championship. At the time of the match, Goldberg had been undefeated in his WCW career, and his defeat came about due to the interference of Nash's former tag team partner Scott Hall, who had used an electric cattle prod to incapacitate him, as well as interference from two other wrestlers, Bam Bam Bigelow and Disco Inferno.

On the subsequent episode of WCW Monday Nitro, Nash professed dissatisfaction with Hall's interference and offered Goldberg a rematch for the following week. However, Goldberg was (kayfabe) arrested halfway through the three-hour Nitro at the Georgia Dome and accused of "aggravated stalking" by Miss Elizabeth (Goldberg was originally to have been accused of rape, but refused to go along with that particular storyline). Although he was later released when Miss Elizabeth could not keep her story straight, Goldberg would not make it back to the arena in time to compete against Nash; it was noted in The Death of WCW by R. D. Reynolds and Bryan Alvarez that the entire skit was proven to be nonsensical after it was revealed that the police station was across the street from the Georgia Dome.

Meanwhile, Hollywood Hogan showed up for the first time since declaring his retirement from wrestling one month prior after expressing a kayfabe desire to run for President. Hogan and Nash had been in a feud since April 1998, when Nash became a fan favorite by breaking away from Hogan's New World Order (nWo) stable in order to form his own rival faction, nWo Wolfpac; Hogan remained a heel, leading his own nWo faction, nWo Hollywood. In Goldberg's absence, Nash offered the title shot to Hogan, who accepted the offer.

Hogan came out to the ring accompanied by Scott Steiner, who had taken over the leadership role in nWo Hollywood. Nash came out next, then revealed a surprise to Hogan and the crowd by stopping at the end of the entrance ramp and pointing backwards. The surprise was Hall, who had been a part of nWo Hollywood for most of the previous seven months and who entered wearing a Wolfpac T-shirt. This marked the reunion of The Outsiders, who had broken up as a tag team at Slamboree in May 1998.

== Match ==
The match opened with Nash and Hogan slowly circling each other. After a few moments, Nash shoved Hogan into the corner of the ring and further taunted him. In response, Hogan prepared to throw a punch at Nash, only to stop and casually poke Nash in the chest instead. Nash fell on his back in a theatrical manner, which has been compared to "getting hit in the chest with a cannonball". Hogan then covered him to get the pinfall and was declared the new WCW World Heavyweight Champion.

After this occurred, Hall and Steiner entered the ring and celebrated with Nash and Hogan to signify that the Wolfpac and Hollywood factions were reuniting again. As Hogan had done before each time he had won the title since August 1996, he spray-painted the belt's faceplate with "nWo". However, to signify the reunion with the Wolfpac, Hogan used red spray paint instead of the usual black. Meanwhile, the dissatisfied crowd began pelting the ring with food and other debris.

Goldberg then re-entered the building and ran to the ring to attack the reunited nWo members. Wolfpac member Lex Luger followed him, appearing to assist him, but instead jumped Goldberg from behind and showed he was also part of the reunited nWo. Goldberg was handcuffed to the ropes, repeatedly shocked with a taser, and had "nWo 4 Life" painted in red and black paint all over his back. As he was being humiliated, Buff Bagwell and Miss Elizabeth also arrived and watched, revealing that Elizabeth had been in on the nWo reunion the entire time. A loud "We want Sting!" chant erupted from the fans, hoping that Sting would come to rescue Goldberg and even things up for WCW. However, Sting had been out since Bret Hart attacked him at the previous Halloween Havoc, and would not appear again until after Hogan dropped the belt to Ric Flair at the Uncensored pay-per-view event ten weeks later. By that time the nWo reunion story had largely petered out in favor of Flair taking control of WCW, and most of the nWo members had been sidelined due to injuries.

After Nitro went off the air, team members of the 1998 Atlanta Falcons came to accompany Goldberg.

== Mankind incident ==
Airing opposite Nitro that night was an episode of Raw is War, in which former WCW wrestler Mick Foley (as Mankind) won the WWF Championship for the first time from The Rock. As per their procedures at the time, the World Wrestling Federation (WWF; now WWE) had taped this particular episode of Raw is War six days in advance of the program's airing and even acknowledged the title change on their website immediately after the taping had concluded. Earlier that night, armed with knowledge of the match's outcome, WCW commentator Tony Schiavone, acting on orders from Eric Bischoff, gave away the result before it aired:

"Fans, as Hollywood Hogan walks away and you look at this 40,000 plus on hand, if you're even thinking about changing the channel to our competition, fans, do not, because we understand that Mick Foley, who wrestled here one time as Cactus Jack, is going to win their world title. Ha! That's gonna put some butts in the seats, heh!"

Within minutes, as shown by Nielsen ratings, over half a million viewers switched channels from Nitro on TNT to Raw is War on the USA Network. After the Steve Austin run-in, the title match finish, and the post-match celebration, many fans then switched back to Nitro, which still had five minutes of air time left. The final ratings for the night were 5.7 for Raw is War and 5.0 for Nitro.

The next week on Raw is War, there were signs in the crowd that said: "Mick Foley put my butt in this seat".

== Reception and aftermath ==
In WrestleCrap: The Very Worst of Pro Wrestling, Reynolds says of the Fingerpoke of Doom, "That was that. Fans had been burned one time too many by WCW and the nWo. From that point on in 1999, ratings steadily dropped for the company". Nitro's rating, which had been competitive with WWF despite losing the ratings lead, plummeted and never recovered. The broadcast rating of 5.0 was only bettered once, during an unopposed airing that saw WWF delay the Raw go-home show for the St. Valentine's Day Massacre: In Your House pay-per-view to Saturday. One year later the January 3, 2000 episode of Nitro drew a 3.3 rating against Raw with 6.4. The ratings slide continued until the promotion became defunct.

WWE refers to the match as "one of the most scandalous title changes of all time" and states that "shocking does not even adequately describe this moment". According to wrestling writers Brian Fritz and Christopher Murray, the event insulted fans, with the near 40,000 strong crowd cheated out of the expected Goldberg featuring main event, upset viewers and alerted other wrestlers in WCW of problems. They draw a direct link between the title change and the drop in ratings that took place in its aftermath. In The Death of WCW, Reynolds and Alvarez expand on this link, stating that the January 4 incident "more than any other, started the ball rolling towards the company's inevitable doom". They believe that the "now-legendary" event made the episode "the single most destructive Nitro in the history of the company" and call it a "disaster of epic proportions." The New York Daily News stated that the match "is widely considered the beginning of the end for WCW".

In an interview with RF Video, Nash claimed that he had nothing to do with the booking of the Fingerpoke of Doom. When discussing the incident, Nash said that Goldberg was the one who caused that rumor to be spread and that he had not begun booking until February 1999. In The Rise and Fall of WCW, Goldberg said that the incident was Hogan and Nash playing their own little games against the wrestling world. Furthermore, Reynolds and Alvarez contend in The Death of WCW that the actions of Hogan and Nash, from the time Goldberg beat Hogan in Atlanta until their own match in the same venue six months later (including the match itself), were part of an ongoing plot between the two wrestlers.

In his autobiography, Hollywood Hulk Hogan, Hogan rejected the idea that the Fingerpoke of Doom was pivotal in WCW's fall. He claimed that "watering down the whole concept" of the nWo by splitting the group and creating spinoffs such as the Latino World Order, and an inability to compete with the WWF's more risqué "Attitude style", were more responsible for WCW's downfall. Bischoff's autobiography Controversy Creates Ca$h includes a chapter entitled "The Turning Point That Wasn't", in which he claimed that singling out the Fingerpoke as the reason WCW went under was an oversimplification. Bischoff did acknowledge that people switched from watching Nitro to Raw Is War after Schiavone's remark about Foley winning the WWF Championship, but claimed that "the tide had turned so significantly that us talking about one match didn't matter".

On the August 31, 2009 episode of Raw, Dusty Rhodes, Shawn Michaels and Triple H were shown watching and discussing footage of the Hogan–Nash match backstage.
