= New World Order (professional wrestling) =

Professional wrestling stable

Stable
- Name(s): New World Order nWo nWo Hollywood nWo Black & White nWo Wolfpac nWo Red & Black nWo Elite nWo B-Team nWo 2000 nWo Japan nWo Gundam
- Leader: Hulk Hogan
- Members: Scott Hall; Kevin Nash; Sean Waltman; Other members
- Billed from: Daytona Beach, Florida, U.S.
- Debut: July 7, 1996
- Years active: 1996–2000; 2002; 2014–2025 (reunions)

The New World Order (commonly abbreviated as nWo) was an American professional wrestling stable that originally consisted of "Hollywood" Hulk Hogan, Scott Hall, and Kevin Nash.

The stable originated in World Championship Wrestling (WCW) with the gimmick of a group of unsanctioned wrestlers aiming to "take over" and control WCW in the manner of a street gang. The group later appeared in the World Wrestling Federation (WWF; renamed WWE in May 2002) after the company purchased WCW. The nWo angle became one of the most influential storylines in the mid-to-late 1990s success of WCW and was instrumental in turning mainstream North American professional wrestling into a more mature, adult-oriented product. The stable became one of the main driving forces behind WCW competing with the WWF in the Monday Night War.

Larry Zbyszko is credited with coining the name "New World Order" in relation to the original group/storyline. Eric Bischoff revealed that Zbyszko used the term on July 1, 1996, during a WCW Nitro episode, days before Hulk Hogan's historic heel turn at Bash at the Beach. Bischoff initially assumed the phrase came from his own subconscious, but later acknowledged Zbyszko's contribution to its creation.

Fueled initially by the unexpected villainous turn of Hulk Hogan, the nWo storyline is generally considered one of the most successful angles in the history of modern-day professional wrestling, spawning several imitations and parodies, including the Blue World Order, Latino World Order, and the Juggalo World Order. The group dominated WCW programming throughout the mid-late 1990s and continued until the dissolution of WCW in 2001, during which time there were several, sometimes rival, incarnations of the group. After WWF purchased WCW in 2001, the group was revived in February 2002, but only lasted for five months, dissolving in July in what was now WWE. Since then, there had been sporadic one-night only reunions of the group until 2025. The nWo is widely considered to be one of the greatest storylines in professional wrestling history.

In December 2019, it was announced that the nWo would be inducted into the 2020 WWE Hall of Fame, with Hogan, Hall, Nash, and Sean Waltman as the inducted members.

== Concept ==
The nWo storyline was an idea created by WCW Executive Vice President Eric Bischoff. Bischoff wanted to do an invasion-type angle where World Championship Wrestling (WCW) was being sabotaged by another wrestling group, initially insinuated as being the World Wrestling Federation (WWF), since the nWo's founding members had previously wrestled for the company.

The nWo was originally portrayed as a separate entity from WCW. Often, propaganda-style vignettes and product commercials concerning the nWo were presented in the style of a broadcast signal intrusion, with a voice proclaiming, "The following announcement has been paid for by the New World Order". Others, such as Kevin Nash, television director Craig Leathers, chief WCW booker Terry Taylor, and Taylor's assistants Kevin Sullivan and Paul Orndorff, all contributed their own ideas to the nWo concept.

Leathers approached Disney/MGM Studios for a nWo logo. The designers came back with 6 to 10 examples, and eventually Turner management settled on the logo that would be recognized today. Scott Hall is credited with the group's trademark hand-signals, and Taylor belatedly scrawled the group's most popular catchphrase, "When you're nWo, you're nWo 4 life," in one segment he scripted for WCW Monday Nitro in late 1996.

Along with Bill Goldberg and Sting, the nWo was one of the main factors behind WCW during the Monday Night War and would later be parodied by the World Wrestling Federation's D-Generation X (DX) stable, though the core members of both on-screen factions included members of The Kliq; (Sean Waltman even served as a member of both groups; as did Shawn Michaels for a short time during the nWo's revival in the WWF/E in 2002).

== History ==
=== World Championship Wrestling (1996–2000) ===
==== Formation ====
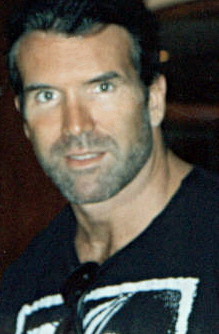
Scott Hall, whose on-screen antics led the WWF to claim that WCW had infringed on their intellectual property

On May 19, 1996, Scott Hall and Kevin Nash wrestled their final matches as Razor Ramon and Diesel, respectively, in the WWF and signed with WCW shortly after. Hall appeared on the May 27, 1996 edition of Nitro, which emanated from the Macon Coliseum in Macon, Georgia. As The Mauler and Steve Doll wrestled, Hall emerged from the crowd and entered the ring, bringing the match to a halt, and called for the ring announcer's microphone. "You people, you know who I am", Hall said to the stunned crowd, "but you don't know why I'm here". He went on to deliver what became known as the "You want a war?" speech, stating that he and unnamed allies had a challenge for WCW executive vice president Bischoff and any WCW wrestlers. As the episode neared its end, Hall accosted Bischoff, who was also the lead broadcaster for Nitro at the time, in the broadcast booth and demanded that he tell WCW owner Ted Turner to pick three of his best wrestlers for "a war". The next week, Hall claimed to have a "big surprise" for fellow professional wrestler Sting. On the following Nitro, the big surprise was revealed to be Nash. Hall and Nash were then dubbed as The Outsiders, randomly appearing at WCW events to cause trouble and inevitably be led out of the building by security.

Hall and Nash were both fully employed by WCW, but the storyline implied that they were contracted WWF wrestlers "invading" WCW. This was enough of a concern to the WWF that it considered legal action over Hall and Nash's antics. Hall was the bigger concern to the WWF, as he had not fully distanced himself from his Razor Ramon character, continuing to use the character's mannerisms and speaking with the character's pseudo-Cuban American accent. WCW attempted to address these concerns at The Great American Bash in June 1996. After Bischoff promised them a match at the next pay-per-view event Bash at the Beach, he directly asked both Hall and Nash if they were employed by the WWF, to which they said no. The WWF, still unsatisfied, filed a lawsuit, claiming that Bischoff had proposed inter-promotional matches that would air on TBS and TNT, thereby associating the two promotions with each other. Also at The Great American Bash, both Hall and Nash pressed Bischoff to name his company's three representatives for their impending match. Bischoff said that he had found three men who would answer their challenge, but would not name them. This would lead to Hall and Nash attacking Bischoff, culminating with Nash powerbombing Bischoff off the stage and through a table below. Bischoff held a draft on Nitro to determine WCW's representatives, with Sting, Lex Luger, and "Macho Man" Randy Savage being chosen.

==== Hostile Takeover Match ====
The match Bischoff promised, a six-man tag team match billed as the "Hostile Takeover match", was scheduled as the main event of Bash at the Beach at the Ocean Center in Daytona Beach, Florida on July 7, 1996. Hall and Nash came to the ring by themselves, leaving speculation open as to who the third man was. Team WCW then entered with all three members wearing Sting's signature face paint as a sign of solidarity.

Luger was hurt and badly injured almost immediately after the match started, when Sting tried to hit Nash with a Stinger Splash, and Luger was pulled into the move by Nash in the process, and had to be taken away on a stretcher. The match reached its climax at approximately the sixteen-minute mark, shortly after a late tag from Sting to Savage. Savage went on the attack, nailing both the Outsiders with repeated axe-handle smashes from the top rope. However, while referee Randy Anderson checked on a downed Hall, Hall grabbed his shirt while Nash nailed Savage with a low blow which knocked both men to the mat. With all four men down, Anderson had no choice but to begin counting them out as he did not see the low blow. As he began his count, the fans' attention turned to the entrance area as Hulk Hogan entered and began walking to the ring to a loud roar from the crowd. Hall spotted him and immediately fled the ring. Hogan, who had not been seen on WCW television for some time, climbed into the ring to chase away Nash and tore off his T-shirt, as he had done many times before.

With the fans still cheering wildly, Hogan stood in the corner nearest and hit his long-time friend Savage with his Atomic Leg Drop, stunning the crowd and turning heel for the first time since his AWA days in 1981. The Outsiders came back into the ring to celebrate with their now-revealed partner as Hogan dropped the leg on the fallen Savage a second time, and after the three men all high-fived, Hogan threw the referee from the ring and hit Savage one last time, with Hall delivering the three count. The official match result was a no contest and Savage had to be carried from the ring by an exhausted Sting.

After the match, the fans that had moments ago been cheering Hogan began to show their disgust toward their now-former hero and his new friends by beginning to throw cups, cans, and assorted trash into the ring. In the midst of the chaos, "Mean" Gene Okerlund came to the ring and demanded an explanation. Hogan justified his actions by saying he was bored with WCW and had grown tired of constantly pandering to the fans, especially considering that more and more of them had started to turn on him since he had joined the company in 1994. During the interview, Hogan proclaimed that he, Hall and Nash were "the new world order of wrestling", formally giving the group its name which had been coined by Larry Zbyszko on commentary a week before – the New World Order.

The show closed with the three wrestlers continuing to taunt the fans, who booed and pelted them with garbage. Wrapping up the event on pay-per-view, a still-stunned Tony Schiavone said: "Hulk Hogan, you can go to hell... straight to hell". The night after Bash at the Beach, Hall and Nash appeared on Nitro without Hogan, attempting to attack Sting, Arn Anderson and Randy Savage, but were held back by WCW security. On the July 15, 1996 edition of Nitro, Hogan returned wearing all black and helped Hall and Nash attack Lex Luger and Big Bubba Rogers during the Nitro main event. He then made a challenge to then-reigning WCW World Heavyweight Champion, The Giant, for Hog Wild in August. On the July 29, 1996 episode of Nitro, The Outsiders attacked Arn Anderson, the American Males (Marcus Bagwell and Scotty Riggs) and Rey Misterio Jr., the latter of whom Nash threw head-first into the side of a WCW production truck before leaving in a limousine.

==== Hogan becomes World Champion; Bischoff's secret is revealed ====
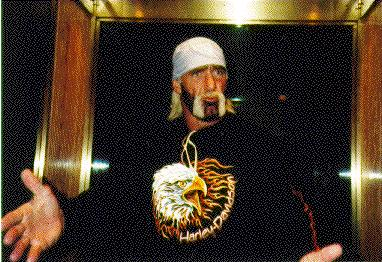
Hulk Hogan during his time in the nWo

At Hog Wild, the newly rechristened "Hollywood" Hulk Hogan won the match after knocking The Giant out with his title belt. After the match, Hogan rechristened the Big Gold Belt as the self-proclaimed nWo World Heavyweight Championship by spray-painting the group acronym in capital letters across the faceplate. On August 26, Ted DiBiase made his WCW debut and would ultimately become the financial supporter and spokesperson of the nWo (thus becoming the fourth man), and was given the nickname "Trillionaire Ted". On the September 2 episode of Nitro, the nWo claimed its first defection from WCW and their fifth member as The Giant, who just weeks earlier lost his title to Hogan, turned on his Dungeon of Doom teammates and attacked The Four Horsemen and Randy Savage.

As the Fall Brawl PPV event neared, WCW was gearing up for another battle against the nWo, this time in a WarGames match. On the September 9 episode of Nitro, the nWo tricked fans and wrestlers into thinking that Sting had joined the nWo by putting wrestler Jeff Farmer into the group as a Sting clone, complete with Sting attire and face paint. Farmer, as the nWo Sting, attacked Luger, who had been lured into an attack by referee Nick Patrick. This led Luger, his longtime ally and tag team partner, to publicly question Sting as to where his allegiance lay. At Fall Brawl, as Team WCW was being interviewed, Sting appeared and told his teammates that he had nothing to do with the attack, but Luger did not believe him. Going into the match, only three wrestlers on each side had been officially named: Hogan and The Outsiders for the nWo, and Luger, Arn Anderson, and Ric Flair for Team WCW. Sting had originally been named the fourth man for WCW, but his participation was in doubt. The fourth man for the nWo was indeed the nWo Sting, who had convinced everyone (including the broadcast team) that the real Sting was nWo. The real Sting showed up moments later as the last man for Team WCW and took apart the entire nWo by himself. After assaulting the nWo, Sting left the ring and Team WCW, yelling at an apologetic looking Luger "Is that good enough for you right there? Is that truth enough?". Team WCW, now fighting a 4-on-3 handicap match, lost when the nWo Sting locked Luger in the Scorpion Death Lock. The next night on Nitro, Sting came out unexpectedly, with no music or pyrotechnics. Keeping his back to the camera, he angrily laid into his fellow wrestlers and co-workers as well as the fans for doubting his true colors, and declared himself a free agent.

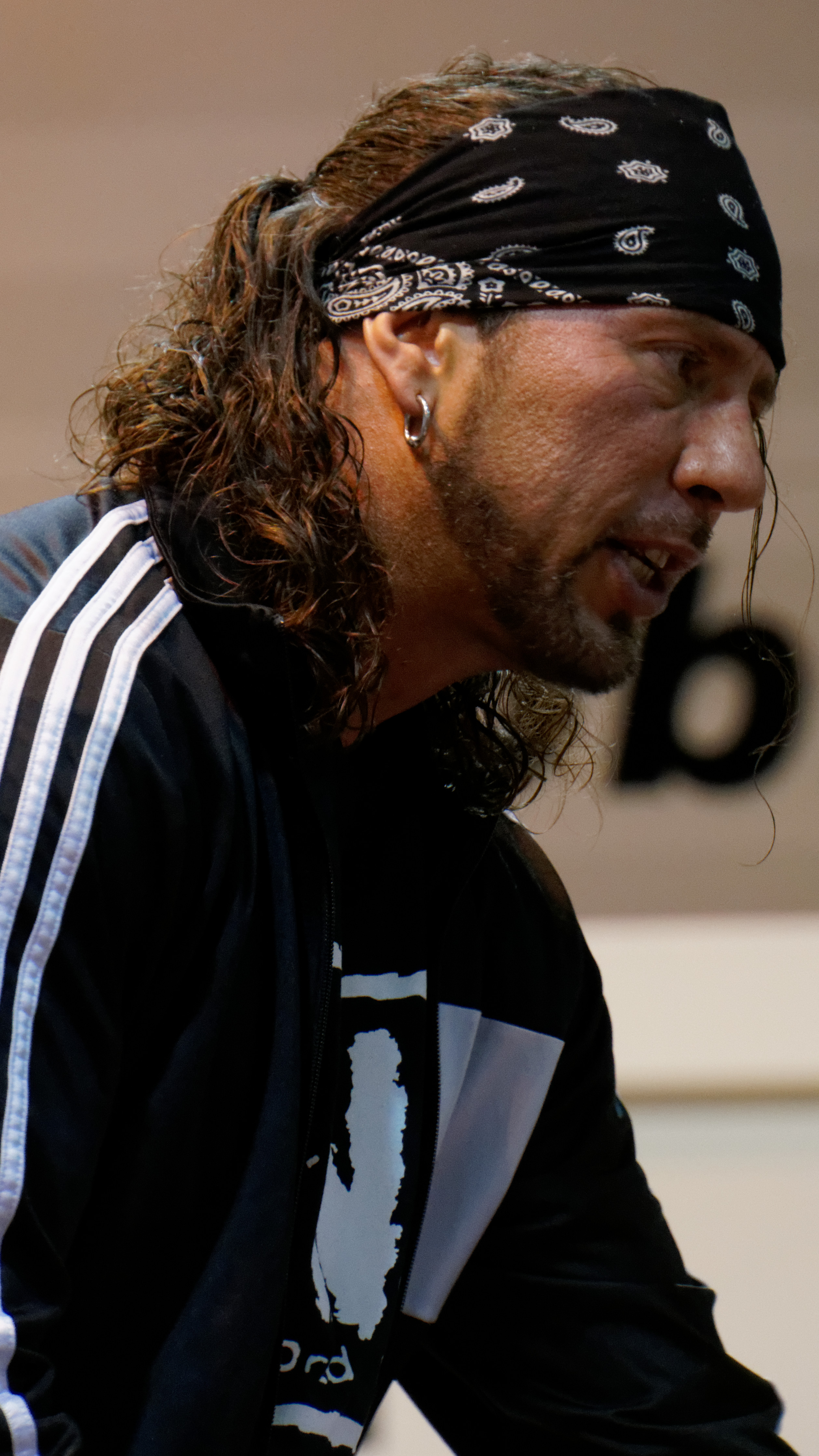
Syxx was the sixth person to join the nWo.

With that, Sting began a retreat from the ring that would last for nearly fifteen months, and in the process, left his loyalties on the table for either side to try and move him to theirs. The nWo stepped up its efforts to try and recruit Sting, yet never removed the nWo Sting from the group. As Sting's character and look evolved, so too did Farmer's nWo Sting character. On the same night Sting made his speech, the nWo inducted Syxx into the group, with the name being a reference to the fact that he was the sixth member (In reality, Syxx was the seventh member of the group, but Farmer's entry into the group was not taken into account). On the September 23rd episode, the nWo debuted Vincent, as its "head of security". Nick Patrick became the group's official referee after he began showing partiality to nWo members during their matches. Miss Elizabeth turned against The Four Horsemen and joined the group as Hogan's valet. nWo tried once more to recruit Sting, who was now sporting black-and-white face paint, to join them. After beating up Farmer's nWo Sting and calling him a "cheap imitation", Sting ambiguously told the nWo, "The real Sting may or may not be in your price range," continuing to leave everyone questioning where Sting's loyalty lay. Sting then told the nWo, "The only thing that's for sure about Sting is nothing's for sure", before leaving the ring. This would be the last time fans would hear Sting talk on WCW television for over a year.

The nWo continued to dominate WCW, with Hogan successfully retaining the World Championship against Randy Savage and Hall and Nash winning the WCW World Tag Team Championship from Harlem Heat (Booker T and Stevie Ray) at Halloween Havoc. At Halloween Havoc, Hogan's old rival Roddy Piper, whom WCW had just signed to a contract, came to the ring to confront Hogan. Piper began looking for a match with Hogan the following night on Nitro.

In the storyline, WCW only recognized Hogan, Nash, and Hall as WCW employees due to their holding WCW championships, and the other nWo members went unrecognized as WCW employees; because of this, they were unable to wrestle other WCW wrestlers. This led to the nWo starting a segment on Saturday Night, called nWo Saturday Night, where nWo stable members wrestled local jobbers inside an empty arena. The nWo also used their "financing" to purchase ad time during WCW programming, which amounted to low budget anti-WCW propaganda, or "hijack" the broadcast signal.

On November 18, 1996, Nitro was live at the Florence Civic Center in Florence, South Carolina and opened with Hall and Nash physically attacking The Nasty Boys (Brian Knobbs and Jerry Sags), High Voltage (Robbie Rage and Kenny Kaos), Ciclope, and Galaxy and forcing Tony Schiavone to walk off the show after they threatened him. As the show moved into its second hour, Hogan and his entourage accosted Bischoff at the announce table and forced him to say that Hogan was better than Piper, who was still seeking a match with Hogan, but whom Bischoff had not agreed on a contract with yet. At the end of the show, Piper and Bischoff began arguing in the ring. As Piper continued to badger Bischoff, the nWo rushed the ring and accosted Piper, revealing that Eric Bischoff, despite appearances, had secretly been a member and the head of the nWo all along.

At World War 3, Piper and Hogan signed an official contract for a match, though Piper would end up being attacked by Hogan and the nWo. In the main event, The Giant won the 60-man battle royal, last eliminating both Lex Luger and Kevin Nash, thus becoming the #1 contender and earning a future world title shot against Hogan.

The following night on Nitro, Bischoff permanently left the broadcast booth, and his character became an egomaniacal tyrant as WCW's executive vice president, as well as a manager and largely replaced DiBiase as spokesperson for the nWo, while DiBiase continued to serve as a manager, mostly for Hogan. At the top of the program, Bischoff issued a threat to the WCW locker room: all wrestlers were given thirty days to convert their WCW contracts into nWo contracts and join the group. Marcus Bagwell (redubbed "Buff Bagwell") immediately accepted the offer, betraying his tag team partner Scotty Riggs in the process. Mr. Wallstreet was offered a contract to join the group on December 9 by his former partner, Dibiase, and accepted. Japanese wrestler Masahiro Chono joined the group on December 16 and established himself as the leader of nWo Japan, a sister stable in NJPW. That same night, Big Bubba Rogers and Scott Norton defected to the group during a show-ending melee between the WCW and nWo rosters.

At Starrcade, Piper cleanly defeated Hogan via a sleeper hold in the main event, in part due to botched interference from The Giant. At the same event, Lex Luger defeated The Giant, marking the nWo's first pinfall loss since the group's inception. During the course of the match, following months of showing favoritism toward the nWo, Nick Patrick officially joined the group when he attacked Luger. Additionally, after multiple attempts to convince Diamond Dallas Page to join the group, Hall and Nash attacked Page in his United States Heavyweight Championship tournament final match against Eddie Guerrero, costing him the match. (The nWo left with physical possession of the title belt, which was then given to Syxx, who began declaring himself as the champion.) The next night on Nitro, The Giant was assaulted and kicked out of the nWo when he refused to perform a chokeslam on Piper during an nWo attack and claimed that he wanted his World Championship match with Hogan.

==== Success and control ====
At nWo Souled Out, Hogan and The Giant fought for the WCW Championship to a no contest in the main event due to the nWo referee, Nick Patrick, being biased toward Hogan. The United States Heavyweight Champion Eddie Guerrero retained and subsequently regained possession of his belt against Syxx in a ladder match, while The Outsiders lost the tag team titles to The Steiner Brothers. Bischoff reversed the decision and re-awarded Hall and Nash the titles the next night on Nitro after claiming that Randy Anderson, who ran in to officiate after Patrick was knocked down, was not the official referee for the match. Bischoff then fired Anderson for his actions.

At SuperBrawl VII, the Outsiders lost their titles to Lex Luger and The Giant, while Syxx defeated Dean Malenko for the WCW Cruiserweight Championship. Later that night, Hogan successfully defended his title against Roddy Piper. "Macho Man" Randy Savage, after weeks of roving with Sting as a "free agent", helped Hogan win. Savage participated in a post-match beatdown of Piper, officially cementing his place in the nWo. The next night on Nitro, Savage helped the Outsiders get revenge on DDP by attacking him from behind while they distracted him, and reunited with Miss Elizabeth. Later, Bischoff returned the tag team titles to The Outsiders, as Luger had been injured and was not cleared to wrestle in the SuperBrawl match. Luger, however, issued a challenge for a "winner-take-all" tag team match at Uncensored. Two weeks later on the March 3 episode of Nitro, Turner Sports vice president Dr. Harvey Schiller "suspended" Bischoff for abuse of his office. At Uncensored, Team nWo won the 3-team tag team match. In addition to winning, per the pre-match stipulations, the nWo gained the right to challenge for any WCW championship whenever and wherever they pleased. After the match, Sting descended from the rafters and attacked the core members of the nWo: Savage, Hall, Nash and Hogan, finally cementing his allegiance to WCW.

It was around this time in April 1997 that tensions began to surface within the nWo. At Spring Stampede, the show ended with Savage and Bischoff at each other's throats after the former's loss to Diamond Dallas Page, and both were held back by other group members. J. J. Dillon, who was appointed as WCW commissioner during Bischoff's suspension, later had Big Bubba Rogers and Mr. Wallstreet removed from the nWo due to a contractual technicality. Additionally, Ted DiBiase quit the group (between late-April and August 4) after feeling remorse for some of the WCW wrestlers who were victims of nWo assaults. In the interim, the nWo recruited The Great Muta on May 26, as well as Hiroyoshi Tenzan and Hiro Saito several weeks after Spring Stampede; they made occasional appearances on television due to their full-time employment in NJPW, but all three would be core members of nWo Japan. The nWo also added Konnan, whom they dubbed "K-Dawg", on July 14 after he attacked Rey Mysterio Jr. while Kevin Nash watched on approvingly.

At Bash at the Beach in July, Dennis Rodman, who had previously become a member of the nWo earlier in the year, made his wrestling debut as he teamed with Hogan to take on Luger and The Giant in a tag team match. Luger won the match for his team by forcing Hogan to submit and earned a title shot at Road Wild, set for August. Luger, however, elected to take his shot on the August 4 episode of Nitro, five days before the pay-per-view, and defeated Hogan to win the WCW Championship. Hogan regained the title at Road Wild after Rodman, dressed as Sting, hit Luger with a baseball bat. Following Road Wild, the nWo began a rivalry with The Four Horsemen, marked by a skit where they mocked members of the group. The Horsemen responded by challenging the nWo to a WarGames match at Fall Brawl in September. The match pitted Ric Flair, Curt Hennig, Steve McMichael and Chris Benoit against Nash, Konnan, Syxx, and Bagwell. During the match, Curt Hennig turned on his team to align with the nWo. The nWo was victorious after McMichael surrendered in the match.

Bret Hart made his WCW debut on the December 15 episode of Nitro and declared he would not join the nWo (the nWo had been claiming weeks beforehand that Bret had already joined the group), but did say he would be the special guest referee for a match between Eric Bischoff and Larry Zbyszko at Starrcade. If Bischoff won the match, the nWo would be given permanent control over Nitro, but if Zbyszko won, it would remain with WCW. Rick Rude (who previously had been in WCW during the early to mid '90s) also joined the nWo around this time, serving as a manager, predominantly for Curt Hennig. On the Nitro before Starrcade, the nWo completely took over the show by tearing down the set and chasing off the WCW announce team. They destroyed anything WCW-related and rebranded it nWo Monday Nitro. This event was done as a test run for what was planned to be a permanent changeover of Nitro to an nWo-centric show, with the soon-debuting Thunder to become the WCW-centric show. However, the ratings dropped dramatically during this show, putting these plans on ice. Zbyszko went on to defeat Bischoff at Starrcade, and Nitro remained in the control of WCW. Also at Starrcade, Hogan lost the WCW World Championship to Sting. Hogan originally pinned Sting, but confusion arose when Hart appeared at ringside and accused referee and former nWo member Nick Patrick of making a fast count. In reality, Nick Patrick was supposed to make a fast count, revealing himself to be a crooked official for the nWo. But for whatever reason, Patrick counted a legitimate three-count instead, leading many to speculate that backstage politics were at play. Bret Hart, who was acting as a referee for the event, ordered the match to restart as a result of the controversy. Hogan then submitted to Sting's Scorpion Death Lock, and the entire WCW locker room came out to celebrate the defeat of Hogan.

==== Dissension; nWo Hollywood and nWo Wolfpac ====
Shortly after Hogan lost the title at Starrcade, the nWo started showing more and more signs of division within the group (in which would lead to Savage's hatred within the nWo and Hogan). Because of the controversy surrounding Sting's title win, J. J. Dillon vacated the title on the inaugural episode of Thunder on January 8, 1998. In addition to the title being vacated, Scott Hall was still slated to face the world champion at SuperBrawl VIII as per the stipulation surrounding his World War 3 win, therefore this also would have to be resolved along with the vacant championship. New WCW commissioner Roddy Piper resolved the issue at Souled Out on January 24 by declaring that since there was no champion for Hall to face at SuperBrawl, he would face the winner of a second Hogan vs. Sting match at Uncensored the following March. Later that evening, the feud between Hall and Larry Zbyszko came to an end when Zbyszko defeated Hall by disqualification after Louie Spicolli, who had just signed with WCW and joined the nWo a month earlier, interfered. After the match Dusty Rhodes, who had been in the broadcast booth that night and who Zbyszko had asked to accompany him to the ring, joined Hall and Spicolli in attacking Zbyszko and joined the nWo, where he served as a manager and mentor to Hall.

The nWo continued to expand their ranks into the new year as former WWF star Brian Adams jumped ship to WCW and immediately joined the nWo. Hogan also gained a second bodyguard when Ed Leslie, who had previously tried to join the nWo at Hog Wild in 1996, re-debuted as a barely recognizable bearded biker dubbed "The Disciple".

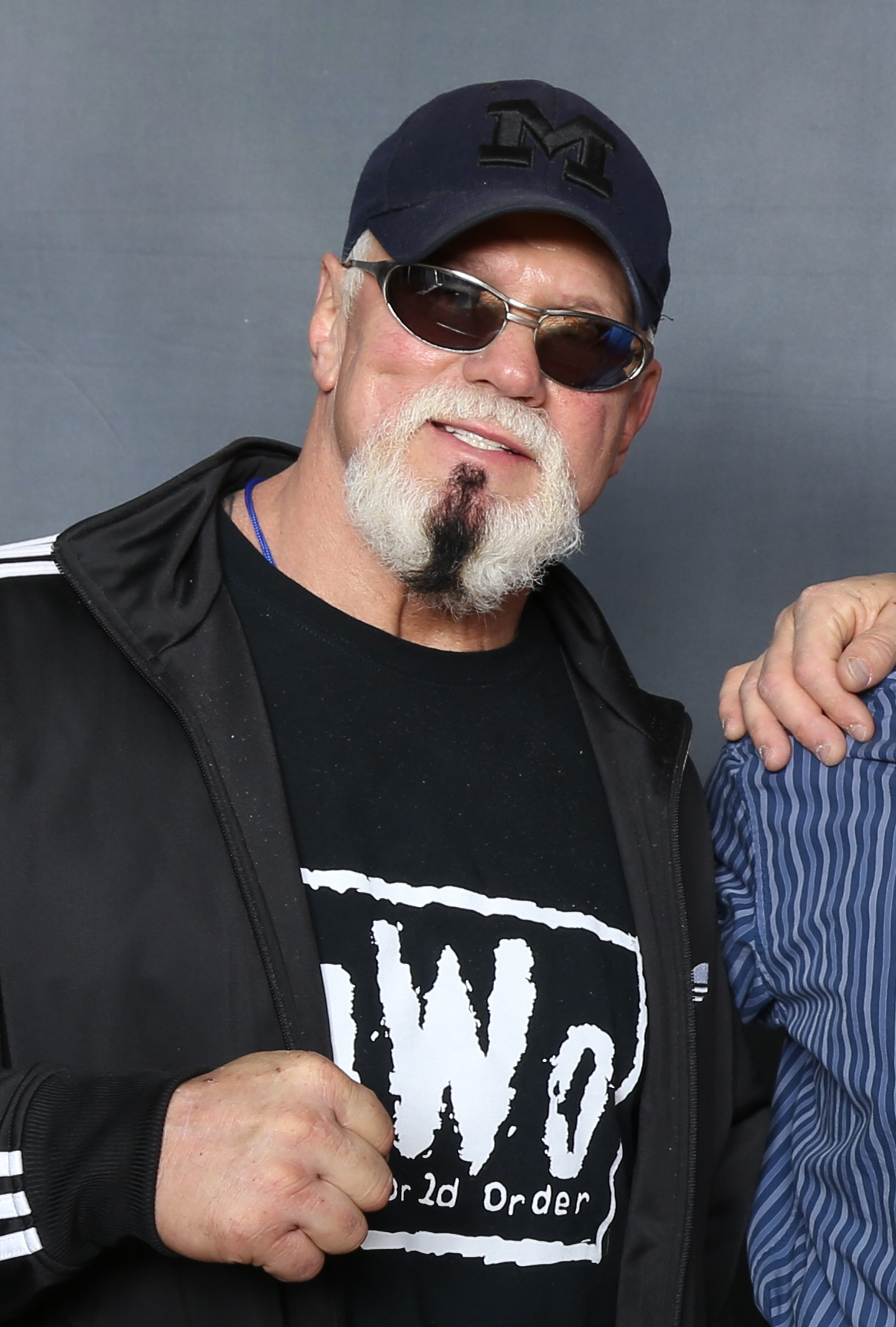
Scott Steiner joined the nWo at SuperBrawl VIII.

At SuperBrawl VIII, the nWo had a mixed array of success. Hall and Nash regained the WCW World Tag Team Championship from The Steiner Brothers after Scott Steiner unexpectedly turned on his brother Rick and manager Ted DiBiase. Scott then handed the championship belts to Hall and Nash after the match and celebrated with The Outsiders and Dusty Rhodes, marking his induction into the nWo. However, Hogan lost to Sting in a match for the vacated WCW World Heavyweight Championship due to interference from Randy Savage. After SuperBrawl, Savage then made his intentions clear and declared that he no longer needed the nWo's help to win matches. Savage also claimed that Hogan had dropped the ball, and that he was going after Sting to try to bring the world championship back to the nWo. Hogan and Savage tried to one-up each other on episodes of Nitro and Thunder over the next few weeks, which led to a steel cage match at Uncensored in March which ended in a no contest. Also at the event, Hall lost his World War 3-earned WCW title match against Sting.

The rift between the different factions of the nWo grew even wider after Syxx, who had been out since November with a severe neck injury, was released from his contract and sent to rehab for his ongoing alcoholism. Shortly thereafter, Scott Hall was also removed from television due to his own bout with alcoholism; this led to a confrontation between Kevin Nash, Eric Bischoff, and Hogan on the March 26 episode of Thunder.

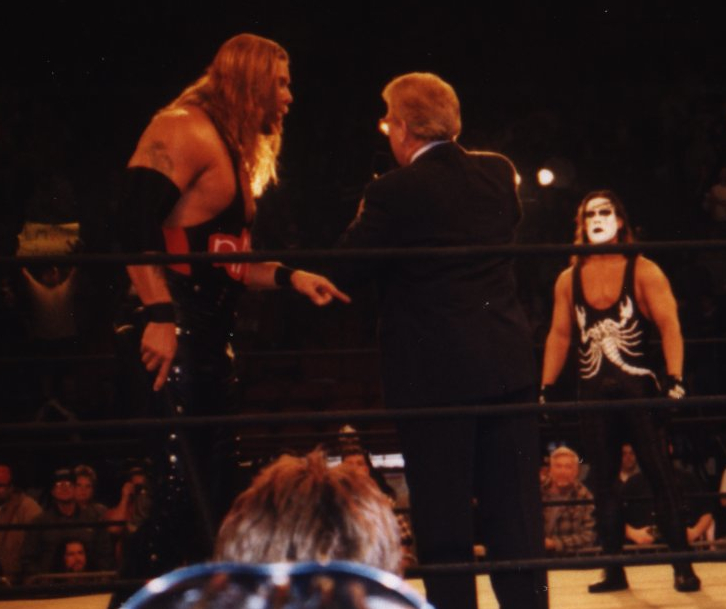
Kevin Nash and Sting, here standing opposite each other in the ring, would later join forces after the formation of the nWo Wolfpac to fight off the nWo Hollywood led by Hogan.

The differences within the nWo were becoming more apparent as Savage and Nash were suddenly realizing that Hogan had been only looking out for himself the entire time, and the nWo was seen as secondary. Nash sided with Savage after Hogan had interfered in a number of Sting/Nash matches, not wanting to have to face Nash for what Hogan claimed was "his title". Nash supported Savage in his quest to defeat Sting, but also agreed to team with Hogan against the returning Roddy Piper and The Giant in a Baseball Bat on a Pole match. At Spring Stampede, Hogan and Nash defeated Piper and The Giant. After the match, however, Hogan assaulted Nash. Nash later helped Savage defeat Sting by hitting a powerbomb on the champion, earning Savage the win, the title, and the ire of Hogan who came out following the match proclaiming that Savage had "his title". Hogan and The Disciple then attacked Nash and Savage to close out the show.

The next night on Nitro, Hogan issued a challenge to the new champion for his title, and WCW commissioner Roddy Piper made the match a no disqualification match and declared that no run-ins would be permitted. Savage and Nash made their own speech a little later, where Nash said to Hogan "have a nice life" and implied that the nWo was not going to be together, at least in its current form, when the night was over.

Late in the match, while Hogan and Savage were fighting in a corner, The Disciple entered the ring and gave referee Nick Patrick a neckbreaker. While this was allowed, due to the match being no disqualification, it also meant that no one was able to stop Hogan and Disciple from doing whatever they wanted to Savage. The Disciple hit his finisher, The Apocalypse, on Savage while the belt was draped over his shoulder. Just after this, a furious Nash charged to the ring to aid the fallen Savage. As Nash entered the ring, Eric Bischoff came sprinting from the back and slid into the ring to intercept him. After tossing Bischoff aside, Nash nailed the Jackknife Powerbomb on Hogan. As the match was still going on, Nash pulled Savage on top of Hogan and went to revive Patrick as Bret Hart entered the ring. Hart picked up the title belt, struck Nash with it, rolled Hogan back over Savage, and revived the referee so he could count the pinfall for Hogan. Although Hogan was now WCW World Heavyweight Champion for a fourth time and appeared to have once again taken the reins of the nWo, the members of the group itself were now going to have to choose whose side of the faction they would be on: Hogan's or Nash's.

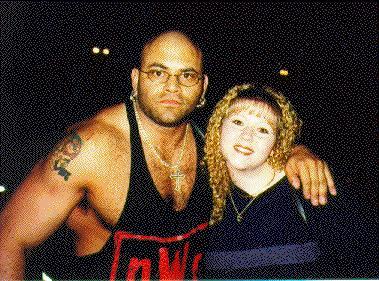
Konnan (left) was a member of the nWo Wolfpac led by Nash.

On the May 4 episode of Nitro, Nash, Savage, and Konnan appeared wearing black shirts with a red nWo logo, as opposed to the familiar white logo. They called themselves nWo Wolfpac (a name which Nash had previously been using alongside Hall and Syxx to refer to themselves as a trio), and were joined in the following weeks by Curt Hennig, Miss Elizabeth, Rick Rude and Dusty Rhodes. The Wolfpac became the first nWo incarnation to wrestle as faces. Hogan's side retained the black and white colors of the original nWo and took on the moniker nWo Hollywood, with Vincent, Bischoff, Scott Steiner, Scott Norton, Brian Adams, Buff Bagwell and The Disciple on his side.

At May's Slamboree, Nash and Hall were set to defend the WCW World Tag Team Championship against two of WCW's stalwarts, Sting and The Giant. However, The Giant joined nWo Hollywood shortly before Slamboree as retribution for Nash injuring him at Souled Out back in January. Despite this, The Giant maintained his alliance with Sting, but strongly suggested that Sting had a decision to make in terms of his allegiance. At Slamboree, Hall made his return to WCW in the colors of the Wolfpac for The Outsiders' title defense. During the match, however, he (along with Rhodes) turned on Nash by hitting him with the title belt, which gave the win to the team of Sting and The Giant. The next night on Nitro, Hall was introduced as the newest member of nWo Hollywood.

On the May 25 episode of Nitro, the Wolfpac added Lex Luger, who subsequently urged his friend Sting to join him. However, nWo Hollywood made their own effort to woo Sting. Sting revealed his decision on the following week's Nitro, fooling Hogan into believing that he was going to join his side, then turning on him and tearing off the black and white T-shirt he was wearing to reveal a red and black one underneath. As part of his joining the Wolfpac, Sting began painting his face red and black instead of the black and white "Crow" style face-paint he had been wearing since 1996. At The Great American Bash, the Wolfpac lost two members as Hennig and Rude turned on Konnan following a loss and joined nWo Hollywood. It was not a total loss for the red and black, however, as Sting defeated The Giant in a singles match for control of the vacated WCW World Tag Team Championship. The next night on Nitro, Sting chose Nash as his tag team partner and the two began defending the titles.

In yet another shocking move, Miss Elizabeth defected from Savage (and the Wolfpac) and joined nWo Hollywood during a shocking promo (which included an on-screen kiss with Bischoff) on the June 8 episode of Nitro. On the June 15 episode of Nitro, Savage had a steel cage match versus Diamond Dallas Page (which featured Piper as special guest referee, and saw all three men on the receiving end of an attack by nWo Hollywood at the end of match). This attack, which resulted in a "knee injury" caused by a chair to his knee, would be the storyline angle for writing Savage off of TV, and he would then take a hiatus from the company to recover from at least two major knee surgeries. This would be Savage's final appearance with the Wolfpac, and with the nWo as a whole.

In the meantime, a new contender for Hogan's championship emerged in the form of undefeated rookie and current United States Heavyweight Champion Goldberg, who had racked up an impressive string of victories. On the July 2, 1998 episode of Thunder, Goldberg was granted a title match against Hogan for the July 6 episode of Nitro. However, Hogan changed his mind and forced Goldberg to wrestle Scott Hall in order to earn his title match. Goldberg defeated Hall and then toppled Hogan in the main event to win his first WCW World Heavyweight Championship. After his loss to Goldberg, Hogan turned his attention to celebrity matches for the next two months, wrestling in two tag team matches at Bash at the Beach and Road Wild. Hogan won the first match with Dennis Rodman over Diamond Dallas Page and Karl Malone. The second match was a culmination of a storyline involving several Tonight Show skits involving Jay Leno making fun of Hogan, which resulted in Hogan and Eric Bischoff taking over the show and Diamond Dallas Page coming to save the day. Hogan and Bischoff lost to Page and Leno thanks to interference from Kevin Eubanks.

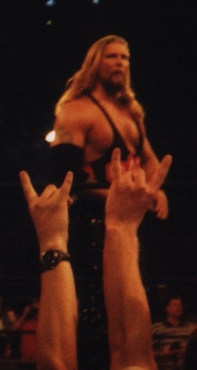
Fans make Wolfpac hand gestures towards Nash.

Meanwhile, the feud between Scott Hall and Kevin Nash continued while Nash continued to defend the tag team championship with Sting. On the July 20 episode of Nitro, Hall and The Giant challenged the champions to a match for the tag team titles. Late in the match, Bret Hart, who had been feuding with Sting over the previous few weeks, came out in an attempt to attack Sting. Sting knocked Hart to the floor and climbed the turnbuckle to taunt him, but the momentary lapse in concentration enabled Hall to pin Sting to win the WCW World Tag Team Championship back to the black and white. nWo Hollywood added a new member to its ranks on the August 24 episode of Nitro when Stevie Ray joined their stable after turning on his brother, Booker T. A few weeks later, they lost a member when The Disciple officially joined O.W.N. and The Warrior on the September 21 episode of Nitro after being "kidnapped" by The Warrior in the previous weeks.

The feud between Hall and Nash culminated in a singles match at Halloween Havoc in October, where Hall earned a countout win when Nash left the ring after soundly assaulting Hall. Nash later stated that he didn't care about winning the match, he just wanted his friend back. On the same night, Hogan defeated The Warrior when Hogan's nephew, Horace, interfered and joined nWo Hollywood. Bret Hart defeated Wolfpac member Sting, injuring him and putting him out of action for around 6 months. This would be Sting's final appearance with nWo Wolfpac.

At World War 3, nWo Hollywood attacked Scott Hall and kicked him out of the group for disrespecting Hogan and Bischoff a few weeks earlier. Later that night in the main event, Kevin Nash won the 60-man battle royal and earned a WCW World Heavyweight Championship shot against the still-undefeated Goldberg. On the Thanksgiving episode of The Tonight Show with Jay Leno, nWo Hollywood leader Hollywood Hogan announced his retirement from professional wrestling and Scott Steiner went on to assume the leadership role in the nWo Hollywood faction. On the November 30 episode of Nitro, Dusty Rhodes was appointed, by Bischoff, to be "special guest referee" during the Barry Windham vs Dean Malenko match later that night, but during the match Rhodes turned on Windham & Bischoff and quit the nWo for good (which resulted in him getting kayfabe fired by Bischoff). At Starrcade, Nash handed Goldberg his first loss and won the WCW World Heavyweight Championship. Disco Inferno interfered in the match and Scott Hall shocked Goldberg with a taser, incapacitating him long enough for an oblivious Nash to hit the Jackknife Powerbomb and score the win.

On the first Nitro after Starrcade (December 28 episode), the main event would be between WCW/nWo president Eric Bischoff and WCW's franchise player Ric Flair. This was after months of feuding and weeks of demanding a match against Bischoff for the presidency of the company. Flair declared he would give up all his possessions if he lost. The match was made by Bischoff, who believed that Flair would not be able to compete after he had a kayfabe heart attack during a promo. Flair, despite interference by The Giant (which led to the shocking return of Savage, who assisted Flair and quit the nWo for good) defeated Bischoff in the match to become WCW president for 90 days, and Bischoff was relegated back to his old position as an on-air commentator. The ending of the match symbolized a new beginning for WCW heading into 1999 and appeared to be the possible conclusion to the nWo storyline.

==== nWo Elite and nWo B-Team ====
As 1999 began, the divided nWo factions were headed by world champion and de facto leader Nash, who was unhappy with Hall's actions at Starrcade, and Scott Steiner, who had taken over nWo Hollywood following Hogan's retirement in November. On the first Nitro of the new year, which took place at Atlanta's Georgia Dome on January 4, Nash and Goldberg were scheduled to face off in a Starrcade rematch as Nash had promised on the December 28 episode of Nitro. However, nWo Hollywood accused the former champion of stalking Miss Elizabeth and Goldberg was arrested and taken from the arena in handcuffs. Later that night, Hogan made his return to WCW for the first time since November 1998 and was challenged by the reigning champion. Hogan accepted Nash's request and took Goldberg's place in the main event. In the match, after the bell rang to begin the bout, Hogan poked Nash in the chest, after which Nash fell to the mat. Hogan covered Nash for the win and became champion again. After the win, Hogan celebrated in the ring with Nash, Hall, and Steiner, revealing that the entire nWo split was all a ruse, and the group had reunited under what would become known as the nWo Elite label.

While Hogan, Hall, Nash, Steiner, Lex Luger, Konnan, Buff Bagwell, Eric Bischoff and Miss Elizabeth were part of the new "nWo Elite" and mostly wore the red and black colors of nWo Wolfpac, the undercard wrestlers in the nWo (The Giant, Curt Hennig, Horace Hogan, Stevie Ray, Brian Adams, Scott Norton, and Vincent) were still in the black and white colors of nWo Hollywood and were never officially assimilated back into the group. The nWo Elite quickly began to "trim the fat" by eliminating a few guys from the newly reunited nWo entirely (first, Konnan and The Giant were both [separately] kicked out on the January 11 episode of Nitro; and then Hennig was kicked out on the January 25 episode of Nitro). The subtractions of The Giant and Hennig from the nWo "black and white" left a short-lived group sardonically labeled the nWo B-Team by fans and commentators. This "B-Team" was a staple of WCW programming throughout 1999, and it officially consisted of Stevie Ray, Brian Adams, Vincent, Horace, and Scott Norton. Stevie Ray eventually became their leader after winning a 4-man Battle Royal match on the April 5 episode of Nitro (Norton was not present for this match).

==== End of the nWo era ====
The reunited nWo did not last long for either faction. The nWo Wolfpac Elite enjoyed initial success with Hogan as WCW World Heavyweight Champion, Steiner as World Television Champion, and Hall as United States Heavyweight Champion. However, the group would quickly be wrecked by injuries when Hall's foot was accidentally backed over by a car, putting him out of action (Hall was subsequently stripped of his title), while Luger suffered a torn biceps and, as a result, he and Miss Elizabeth went on hiatus. Hogan then dropped the WCW World Heavyweight Championship in a First Blood barbed wire steel cage match at Uncensored to Ric Flair, and Steiner lost the World Television Championship to Booker T after Buff Bagwell accidentally nailed him with a chair. Shortly after, Steiner assaulted Bagwell and threw him out of the group. Scott later reunited with his brother Rick, who interfered on Scott's behalf during his match with Bagwell at Slamboree in May 1999.

A month earlier, Hogan suffered a severe injury during a fatal four-way match (with Page, Flair and a returning Sting, with a returning Randy Savage as the special guest referee) at Spring Stampede for the WCW World Heavyweight Championship, which Diamond Dallas Page won, and was put out of action for three months. It has since been debated whether this injury was legitimate or not. Nash then began a rivalry with Page, who he blamed for causing Hogan's injury, and defeated him for the WCW Championship at Slamboree. Scott Steiner was forced to go on hiatus due to a back injury and was subsequently stripped of the United States Heavyweight Championship. Other minor members included Disco Inferno, David Flair, and Samantha. Inferno engaged in a feud with Konnan that ended with a loss to him at Spring Stampede (which was the quiet end of his membership), while Flair and Samantha were quietly removed from television following Hogan's title loss at Uncensored.

However, by that time, the nWo Elite had collapsed and no longer had any importance in WCW. As the year went on, the nWo Black and White (B-Team) members slowly began distancing themselves from each other. Stevie Ray left the group in July to reform Harlem Heat with his brother Booker T. Brian Adams was kicked out of the group on the August 16 episode of Nitro and vanished from WCW programming for some time, eventually returning and forming a tag team with Bryan Clark called KroniK. Scott Norton left WCW completely after the September 30 episode of Thunder and returned to Japan. Vincent left the group and joined The West Texas Rednecks alongside former nWo stablemates Curt Hennig and Barry Windham, changing his name to "Curly Bill" and later to "Shane" (as another slap at Vince McMahon). Horace Hogan would quietly go on his own after all of this.

Hogan and Nash also entered a feud before the end of the summer. Nash lost the WCW Championship in a tag team match at Bash at the Beach in July pitting him and Sting against Sid Vicious and Randy Savage as Savage pinned him. The next night, Hogan returned to Nitro and accepted a challenge from Savage for the championship; Nash interfered by hitting a Jacknife Powerbomb on Savage and gave Hogan the victory, but the next week Nash attacked Hogan during a match with Vicious and aligned himself with Vicious and Rick Steiner. Over the next few weeks, Hogan and Nash, along with Vicious and Steiner (on Nash's side) and Sting and a returning Goldberg (on Hogan's side) feuded with each other, culminating in a match at Road Wild where Hogan put his title and career on the line against Nash's career. Hogan returned to his red and yellow attire on Nitro shortly before, and subsequently dropped the "Hollywood" moniker from his name. Hogan won the match, thus forcing Nash to retire and ending the nWo Wolfpac elite completely. Nash did continue to make appearances afterward, usually stirring up trouble backstage with Hall as his cohort.

==== nWo 2000 ====
In late December 1999, Nash, Hall, Jeff Jarrett, and Bret Hart once again reformed the nWo, this time with the colors black and silver. Jeff Jarrett was often accompanied by the nWo girls (Midajah, April Hunter, Major Gunns, Pamela Paulshock and Shakira). Hall, Nash and Jarrett interfered on Hart's behalf in his match with Goldberg, causing Hart to win the vacant WCW World Heavyweight Championship. After Goldberg accidentally injured himself breaking the nWo's limousine windshield, Sid Vicious, Chris Benoit and Terry Funk were left to feud with the nWo.

Scott Steiner returned and rejoined the group after attacking Vicious. He later would be accompanied by the nWo girls. The Harris Brothers acted as the nWo's bodyguards before joining the group themselves. As nWo members, The Harris brothers would become WCW Tag Team Champions twice. Hart was forced to vacate the WCW World Heavyweight Championship and went on hiatus from WCW in mid-January due to an injury suffered in a match with Goldberg at Starrcade 1999.

At the following pay-per view Souled Out, Nash defeated Funk to become WCW commissioner, but his reign was cut short after he suffered a broken ankle and had to withdraw from WCW for a while. Jarrett won a title shot soon after, facing new WCW World Heavyweight Champion Sid Vicious at SuperBrawl 2000. However, Jarrett also feuded with fellow nWo member Scott Hall after Hall attempted to defeat Vicious and win the title himself. The match at Superbrawl was changed to a triple threat match between Hall, Jarrett and Vicious. Vicious won the match and Hall left WCW for good. Jarrett faced Vicious for the title again at Uncensored but lost. With the return of Eric Bischoff and Vince Russo in April, the nWo completely dismantled and Jarrett, Steiner and the Harris brothers joined The New Blood while the returning Nash joined The Millionaire's Club.

=== World Wrestling Federation / WWE (2002) ===
==== Feud with The Rock and Stone Cold Steve Austin ====
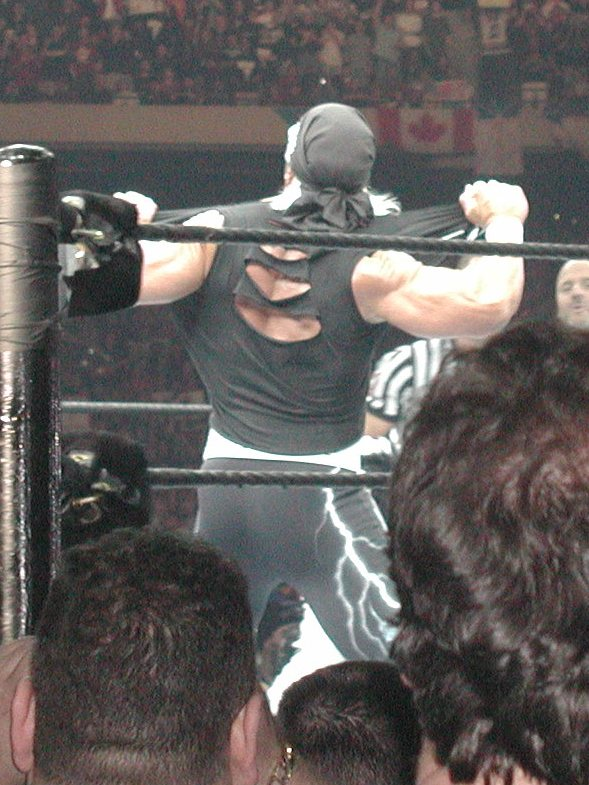
Hogan making his entrance at WrestleMania X8 in March 2002, his first WrestleMania in nine years

After the WWF bought the WCW video library and trademarks in 2001, Vince McMahon brought in Hogan, Hall and Nash, the original nWo, at No Way Out in February 2002 as hired thugs in an attempt to "kill" the WWF so that McMahon would not have to share power with new WWF kayfabe co-owner Ric Flair. The nWo began by targeting the company's two biggest stars, Stone Cold Steve Austin and The Rock. This rivalry led up to Scott Hall going against Austin, and Hogan going against The Rock at WrestleMania X8 (matches which Hall and Hogan both lost). As a result of Hogan shaking hands with The Rock and getting a positive response from the crowd after his match at WrestleMania, he turned face and began feuding with Hall and Nash, with The Rock and Kane at his side on occasion, permanently leaving the nWo in the process. Hall and Nash then brought in former nWo member X-Pac on the March 21, 2002 episode of SmackDown! in Ottawa, Ontario.

On March 25, the nWo (now consisting of Nash, Hall, and X-Pac) was drafted by Ric Flair to the Raw brand despite rivaling against them. For the next two weeks, the nWo feuded with Kane until he was lured backstage by X-Pac and put out of action by having his head smashed against the floor with a chair. Following this, Nash was suspended for attacking Kane in storyline. In reality, Nash had injured his biceps and needed time off to recover. X-Pac would then begin wearing Kane's mask, taunting him on the fact that he put him out of action. Bradshaw, who had come to Kane's aid, fought Hall at Backlash, which Hall won with help from X-Pac. Big Show rejoined the nWo on the April 22 episode of Raw when Flair teamed him up with Austin, whom Big Show chokeslammed.

==== Attempts to rebuild and collapse ====
The nWo was shortly joined by Flair when he attacked Austin with a chair and Hall was ejected out of the group and fired from Raw for "repeatedly dropping the ball" on Austin. In actuality, Hall had asked for his release for personal reasons. Lacking members, Flair would recruit Booker T and continued his feud with Austin. Austin defeated Big Show and Flair in a Handicap match at Judgment Day.

With Booker T now in the group, his partner Goldust attempted and failed many times to get in, with the rest of the members (X-Pac and Big Show) becoming frustrated at Booker T. With Nash returning and attempting to rebuild the nWo, he brought Shawn Michaels into the faction on the June 3 episode of Raw. Michaels then literally "kicked" Booker T out of the nWo a week later. Michaels, then in the midst of a four-year retirement from professional wrestling, became the first nWo member who had never wrestled in WCW.

On July 8, Nash returned to action on Raw, teaming up with Eddie Guerrero, X-Pac, Big Show, and Chris Benoit to take on Booker T, Goldust, Bubba Ray Dudley, Spike Dudley, and Rob Van Dam. Seconds after tagging in for the first time, Nash tore his quadriceps after delivering a big boot onto Booker T, immediately putting him back on the injured list. On the following Raw on July 15, Vince McMahon came out to the ring to the entrance of the nWo music and made the announcement that the group was officially disbanded as Eric Bischoff became Raw General Manager later that night. Afterwards, the nWo storyline was stopped, and the remaining members drifted apart. Michaels returned to active competition within weeks, Big Show was eventually traded to the SmackDown! brand, and X-Pac was released from his contract.

==== WWE sporadic appearances (2014–2021) ====
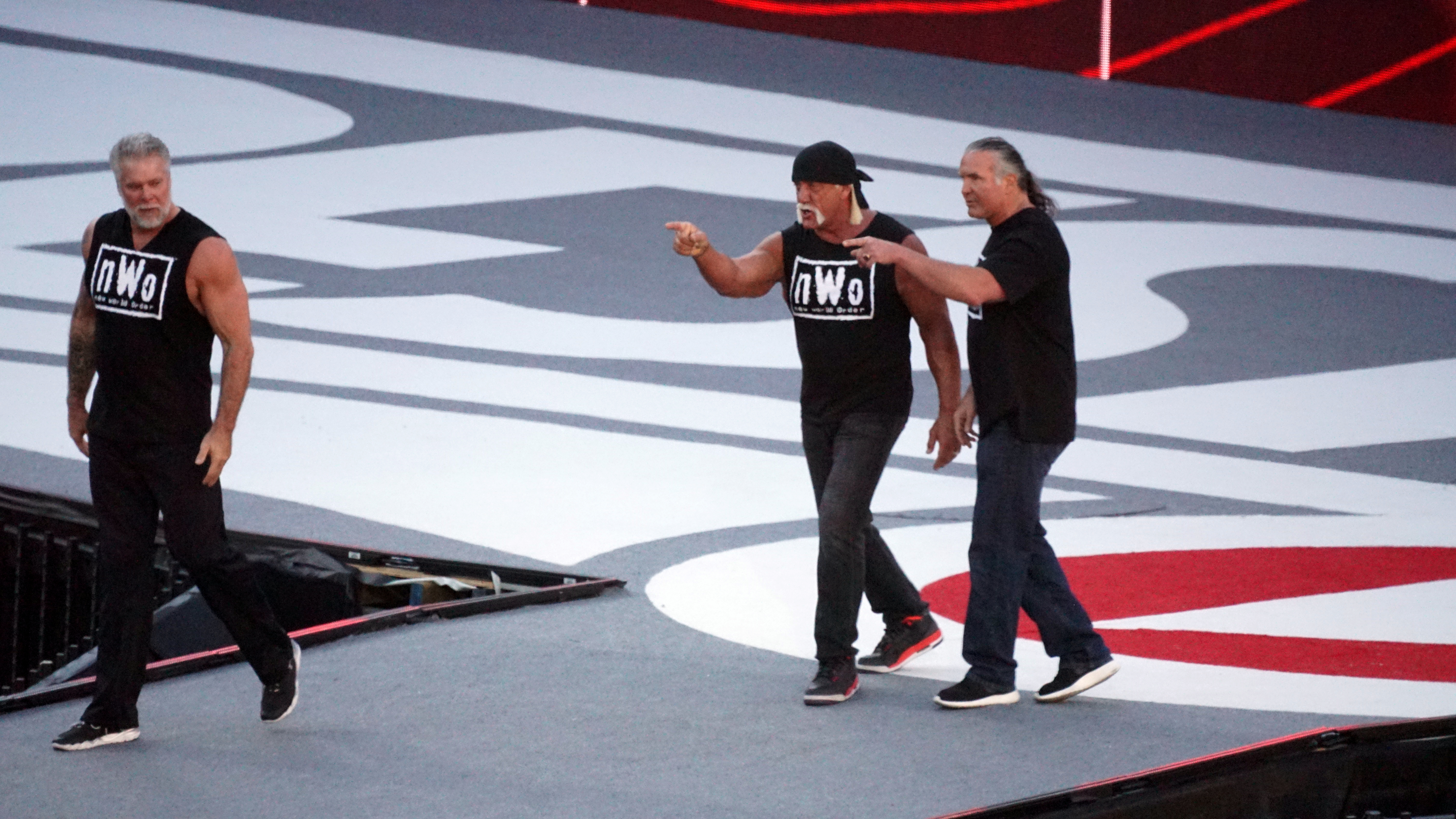
The nWo making their way to the ring at WrestleMania 31

The August 11, 2014 episode of Raw, which aired on Hulk Hogan's 61st birthday, featured Scott Hall and Kevin Nash as guests. The two came out to the nWo music, dressed in nWo attire and shared a moment with Hogan, who revealed an nWo shirt hidden under his "Hulk Rules" shirt. They were interrupted by Brock Lesnar, who told Hogan, "Party's over, grandpa". Lesnar backed out of the ring after being confronted by John Cena, his opponent at SummerSlam.

On the January 19, 2015 episode of Raw, X-Pac, Scott Hall, and Kevin Nash came out for a survey segment. They were interrupted by The Ascension, who were then beaten down by the nWo, The APA, and The New Age Outlaws. On March 29 at WrestleMania 31, Hogan, Nash, and Hall returned to assist their long-time rival Sting in his WrestleMania debut match against Triple H. The nWo helped to fight off D-Generation X (X-Pac, Billy Gunn and Road Dogg), who had interfered on behalf of Triple H. Shawn Michaels later joined Triple H's side, turning the match in his favor, and Triple H would go on to win the match.

On April 7, 2019 at WrestleMania 35, Nash and Hall appeared as doctors during a backstage segment with Alexa Bliss, Michael Che, and Colin Jost. On July 22, 2019, during WWE Raw Reunion, Hall and Nash appeared as an aid to Seth Rollins and D-Generation X to confront The O.C. Hogan, Hall, Nash, and X-Pac then appeared at WrestleMania 37 (the night after the group's induction into the WWE Hall of Fame) in a backstage segment with Bayley and Titus O'Neil.

In May 2026, former WWE writer Chris Dunn revealed that there were plans to reboot the nWo stable during the ThunderDome era that was set to feature The Bar (Sheamus and Cesaro), Shinsuke Nakamura and Lars Sullivan; with an unnamed nWo legend originally set to introduce the new stable but he was tested positive for COVID-19 after arriving in Orlando, which resulted the angle scrapped entirely.

=== Appearances outside WWE (2018–2025) ===
The nWo appeared in a Heavy on Wrestling (HOW) show on August 18, 2018, during a match between X-Pac and Arik Cannon vs. Darin Corbin and Ryan Cruz. Near the end of the match, Scott Hall and Kevin Nash inducted Cannon as a first new (albeit unofficial) member of the nWo in nearly a decade with Eric Bischoff appearing at the event. On October 19, 2018, the nWo (Buff Bagwell, Scott Norton and Syxx) competed against the No New Friends at the Glory Pro Wrestling #Unsanctioned event. The original nWo (Hall, Hogan and Nash) reunited in the 2Sweet nWo Reunion Tour in Orlando on October 27, 2018. In Uncasville, Connecticut, the nWo held its reunion show at the Mohegan Sun Arena on March 2, 2019.

== Legacy and impact ==
In 1997, the nWo had their own pay-per-view event called Souled Out. It was practice for WCW events to have co-brand naming (see WCW/nWo Starrcade) from January 24, 1998 to March 14, 1999. The WCW World Heavyweight Championship occasionally received this co-branding as well, particularly in ring introductions performed by Michael Buffer.

The nWo has inspired many parody factions like Stevie Richards' Blue World Order and Eddie Guerrero's Latino World Order. During his time in Juggalo Championship Wrestling (JCW), Hall, along with Corporal Robinson and the Insane Clown Posse formed the Juggalo World Order at JCW's Evansville Invasion on October 6, 2007. To date, fellow nWo alumni Sean Waltman and Kevin Nash have joined this faction for occasional matches.

The group's main logo has been parodied in various WWE merchandise for various wrestlers and groups, such as Randy Orton's "rKo" shirt, WWE NXT's "nXt: next generation" shirt, and Santos Escobar's LdF shirt.

The nWo had major crossover appeal in its heyday. Football teams such as the New York Jets and the Jacksonville Jaguars were selling jWo (Jets World Order and Jaguar World Order respectively) shirts at NFL games in 1998. In that same year, Sin City Productions released a pornographic film called Nude World Order. The wrestling-themed Japanese manga Kinnikuman featured a stable called the dMp (standing for Demon Making Plant).

When Hulk Hogan joined Total Nonstop Action Wrestling in January 2010, Hall, Nash and Waltman (all of whom had been with the company previously) began to appear as The Band, a group whose name was a reference to the 2000 incarnation of the nWo's "the band is back together" slogan. The group used a version of the Wolfpac theme as its entrance music. It disbanded within the year.

Former New Japan Pro-Wrestling (NJPW) stable Bullet Club takes some of its gestures and mannerisms from the nWo like the "too sweet" hand gesture as an homage, and have been considered the stable that most closely resembles the nWo since its inception.

The nWo logo has even made an appearance in college football. When Jacob Peeler was hired as receivers coach at the University of Mississippi (also known as Ole Miss) before the 2017 season, he sought an identity for his group and came up with "Nasty Wide Outs", creating a wrestling-style championship belt with the original nWo logo affixed to it. Ever since, the Ole Miss nWo belt has been displayed on the sidelines by every receiver who has caught a touchdown pass and awarded after each game to a receiver seen by Peeler as deserving of the title belt.

On December 9, 2019, WWE announced that the nWo, consisting of Hogan, Hall, Nash, and Waltman, would be inductees into the WWE Hall of Fame Class of 2020. On the January 29, 2020 edition of Chris Jericho's podcast Talk Is Jericho, Scott Hall stated that he felt Eric Bischoff should also be inducted into the WWE Hall of Fame as a member of the nWo. Jericho agreed, noting Bischoff's vital on-and-off screen role with the group, and suggested that he was not being inducted into the WWE Hall of Fame as an nWo member was due to ongoing "residual heat". However, Bischoff was eventually inducted into the WWE Hall of Fame as part of the class of 2021.

Hall died at the age of 63 on March 14, 2022. He had struggled with alcohol abuse and chronicled his substance issues in an ESPN documentary in 2011, in which he said "I should have been dead 100 times". Before his death, Hall had suffered three heart attacks after surgery complications, according to Marc Mero.

On July 24, 2025, Hogan died of cardiac arrest at his home in Clearwater, Florida at the age of 71. Emergency personnel responded to the scene, and he was transported from his home by local ambulance. His death came a month after he underwent major spinal fusion surgery, although his wife Sky denied reports that it was part of a more serious health-related issue.

== Championships and accomplishments ==
- New Japan Pro-Wrestling
  - IWGP Heavyweight Championship (3 times) – Masahiro Chono (1), Scott Norton (1), The Great Muta (1)
  - IWGP Tag Team Championship (3 times) – Masahiro Chono and The Great Muta (1), Masahiro Chono and Hiroyoshi Tenzan (1), Hiroyoshi Tenzan and Satoshi Kojima (1)
  - Super Grade Tag League (1997) – Masahiro Chono and The Great Muta
  - Super Grade Tag League (1998) – The Great Muta and Satoshi Kojima
  - G1 Tag League (1999) – The Great Muta and Scott Norton
- Nikkan Sports
  - Match of the Year (1999) – Keiji Mutoh vs. Genichiro Tenryu on May 3 at Strong Energy – Tag 14
  - Outstanding Performance (1998) – Keiji Mutoh
  - Technique Award (1997) – The Great Muta
  - Wrestler of the Year (1997) – Masahiro Chono
  - Wrestler of the Year (1999) – Keiji Mutoh
- Pro Wrestling Illustrated
  - Comeback of the Year (2002) – Hollywood Hulk Hogan
  - Feud of the Year (1996) – Eric Bischoff vs. Vince McMahon
  - Feud of the Year (1997) – Randy Savage vs. Diamond Dallas Page
  - Match of the Year (2002) – Hollywood Hulk Hogan vs. The Rock on March 17 at WrestleMania X8
  - Most Hated Wrestler of the Year (1996, 1998) – Hollywood Hogan
  - Most Inspirational Wrestler of the Year (1999) – Hollywood Hogan
  - Rookie of the Year (1996) – The Giant
  - Tag Team of the Year (1997) – Kevin Nash and Scott Hall
  - Wrestler of the Year (1996) – The Giant
- Tokyo Sports
  - Match of the Year (1999) – Keiji Mutoh vs. Genichiro Tenryu on May 3 at Strong Energy – Tag 14
  - Outstanding Performance (1998) – Keiji Mutoh
  - Wrestler of the Year (1997) – Masahiro Chono
  - Wrestler of the Year (1999) – Keiji Mutoh
- World Championship Wrestling
  - WCW Cruiserweight Championship (1 time) – Syxx
  - WCW United States Heavyweight Championship (6 times) – Curt Hennig (1), Lex Luger (1), Scott Hall (1), Scott Steiner (1), Jeff Jarrett (2)
  - WCW World Heavyweight Championship (8 times) – Hollywood Hogan (4), Kevin Nash (2), Randy Savage (1), Bret Hart (1)
  - WCW World Tag Team Championship (11 times) – Kevin Nash and Scott Hall (6)^{2}, Sting and The Giant (1), Sting and Kevin Nash (1), Scott Hall and The Giant (1), Ron and Don Harris (2)
  - WCW World Television Championship (2 times) – Konnan (1), Scott Steiner (1)
  - World War 3 (3 times)
    - The Giant (1996)
    - Scott Hall (1997)
    - Kevin Nash (1998)
- World Wrestling Entertainment/WWE
  - WWE Hardcore Championship (1 time) – Big Show
  - WWE Hall of Fame (Class of 2020) – Hogan, Hall, Nash, and Waltman
- Wrestling Observer Newsletter
  - Best Box Office Draw (1997) – Hollywood Hogan
  - Best Gimmick (1996) – nWo
  - Feud of the Year (1996) New World Order vs. World Championship Wrestling
  - Most Embarrassing Wrestler (1996, 1998–1999) – Hulk/Hollywood Hogan
  - Readers' Least Favorite Wrestler (1996–2000) – Hollywood Hogan (1996–1999), Kevin Nash (2000)
  - Rookie of the Year (1996) – The Giant
  - Worst Match of the Year (1997) – Hollywood Hogan vs. Roddy Piper on February 23 at SuperBrawl VII
  - Worst Match of the Year (1998) – Hollywood Hogan vs. The Warrior on October 25 at Halloween Havoc
  - Worst Wrestler (1997, 1999–2000) – Hollywood Hogan (1997), Kevin Nash (1999–2000)

^{1} As part of the New World Order (nWo) storyline, the title was spray painted each time with the "nWo" initials and renamed as the nWo/WCW World Heavyweight Championship, while referred to by nWo members only as the nWo World Heavyweight Championship.

^{2} During one of their reigns, the nWo invoked "Wolfpac Rules" and named Syxx a co-champion due to a legitimate injury to Nash.

== Media ==
- nWo 4 Life! (June 1, 1999, VHS)
- nWo: Back in Black (May 28, 2002, VHS and DVD)
- nWo: The Revolution (November 6, 2012, DVD and Blu-ray)
