= Uncensored (2000) =

2000 World Championship Wrestling pay-per-view event

- Promotional poster featuring Kevin Nash, Bret Hart, Scott Steiner and Jeff Jarrett
- Promotion: World Championship Wrestling
- Date: March 19, 2000
- City: Miami, Florida
- Venue: American Airlines Arena
- Attendance: 5,000
- Buy rate: 60,000
- Tagline: Outside The Rules.

Pay-per-view chronology
← Previous; SuperBrawl	Next → Spring Stampede

Uncensored chronology
← Previous; 1999	Next → Final

The 2000 Uncensored was the sixth and final Uncensored professional wrestling pay-per-view (PPV) event produced by World Championship Wrestling (WCW). The event took place on March 19, 2000 from the American Airlines Arena in Miami, Florida.

Eleven matches were contested at the event. The double main event saw Hulk Hogan defeat Ric Flair in a Yappapi Indian Strap match and Sid Vicious retain his WCW World Heavyweight Championship against Jeff Jarrett. In other prominent matches, Sting defeated The Total Package in a Lumberjack match, Dustin Rhodes defeated Terry Funk in a Bullrope match, and The Harris Brothers (Ron and Don) defeated The Mamalukes (Big Vito and Johnny the Bull) to win the WCW World Tag Team Championship. The event also marked the WCW debut of Chris Candido.

The event generated 60,000 ppv buys.

== Storylines ==
The event featured professional wrestling matches that involve different wrestlers from pre-existing scripted feuds and storylines. Professional wrestlers portray villains, heroes, or less distinguishable characters in the scripted events that build tension and culminate in a wrestling match or series of matches.

== Event ==
Other on-screen personnel
Role:	Name:
Commentators	Tony Schiavone
Commentators	Mike Tenay
Commentators	Mark Madden
Interviewer	Gene Okerlund
Referees	Mickie Jay
Referees	Nick Patrick
Referees	Charles Robinson
Referees	Billy Silverman
Ring announcers	Michael Buffer
Ring announcers	David Penzer

The show opened with Chris Candido making his debut, joining the announce team, stating he will defeat whoever wins the opening match, for the championship. The opening match saw The Artist Formerly Known as Prince Iaukea retain the WCW Cruiserweight Championship against Psychosis. Iaukea hit a jumping DDT for the pin, after Paisley distracted Psychosis.

Miss Hancock next joined the announce, after Lane and Rave said they no longer wanted her to be their manager. Miss Hancock announced that she already had her new tag team, Silver King and El Dandy. In the next match Norman Smiley and The Demon defeated Lane and Rave via submission to Smiley's Crossface Chickenwing.

Bam Bam Bigelow next defeated The Wall by disqualification, after The Wall chokeslammed Bigelow through a table.

In a hardcore match, under elimination rules, for the WCW Hardcore Championship Brian Knobbs defeated 3 Count (Evan Karagias, Shannon Moore, and Shane Helms). Knobbs first pinned Helms after holding a steel chair to his face and hitting it with a mop. Knobbs then pinned Karagias following a powerbomb from the ring onto the floor, through a table. Moore thought he then pinned Knobbs after Karagias hit a dropkick off the top, putting Knobbs through a table, however Knobbs was able to get his foot onto the bottom rope. Knobbs then hit Moore with a trashcan off the middle rope, for the pin.

In the next match Billy Kidman and Booker T beat Harlem Heat 2000 (Big T and Stevie Ray) via pinfall. In a falls count anywhere match, Vampiro next defeated Fit Finlay. In the next match, The Harris Brothers (Ron and Don) won the WCW World Tag Team Championship by defeating The Mamalukes (Big Vito and Johnny the Bull), in a no disqualification match.

Prior to the next match Terry Funk brought out a chicken, stating it was Dustin Rhodes' little brother. The match was scheduled to be a bullrope match, however during the match Funk stated he was changing the match to an "I Quit" match. Although Funk was about to get Rhodes to quit the referee stated that Funk did not have the authority to change the match stipulation.

The following match was a lumberjack match between Sting and The Total Package. The lumberjacks for the match were: Jimmy Hart, Curt Hennig, Doug Dillinger, Fit Finlay, Brian Knobbs, Vampiro, Ron Harris, Don Harris, Stevie Ray, Big T and Hugh Morrus. Sting's lumberjacks had casts on their hands that were broken by Luger in the past. Package's lumberjacks had fake casts on their arm to mock and have the same advantage as Sting's lumberjacks. During the match, Tank Abbott came down to ringside and punched Doug Dillinger in the face. During the match, Ric Flair and Elizabeth interfered trying to attack Sting, but were both taken down by Jimmy Hart and Vampiro. Ultimately Sting was able to defeat Luger via pinfall following the Scorpion Death Drop.

In the double main event, During the WCW World Heavyweight Championship match, Sid Vicious retained his title against Jeff Jarrett. After Jarrett hit Sid with the Guitar, Hulk Hogan interrupted the referee's count and attacked Jarrett. Scott Steiner, after having not appeared on television for two months, made a surprise return attacking Hogan. Ric Flair immediately came out and started his scheduled Yappapi Indian Strap match with Hogan. Hogan was ultimately able to pin Flair despite outside interference from Lex Luger.

== Reception ==
In 2007, Arnold Furious of 411Mania gave the event a rating of 1.5 [Extremely Horrendous], stating, "I’m nearing the end of my WCW coverage and it’s about damn time. The shows are genuinely getting worse with Booker/Kidman v Harlem Heat scoring MOTN here at *1/2. That’s just sad. If you see WCW on a tape and then 2000 after the initials then the show sucks. Avoid at all costs."

== Results ==
No.	Results	Stipulations	Times
1	The Artist (c) (with Paisley) defeated Psychosis (with Juventud Guerrera)	Singles match for the WCW Cruiserweight Championship	07:22
2	Norman Smiley and The Demon defeated Lane and Rave	Tag team match	03:41
3	Bam Bam Bigelow defeated The Wall by disqualification	Singles match	03:21
4	Brian Knobbs defeated 3 Count (Evan Karagias, Shannon Moore, and Shane Helms) (c)	Hardcore match for the WCW Hardcore Championship	06:51
5	Billy Kidman and Booker (with Torrie Wilson) defeated Harlem Heat 2000 (Big T and Stevie Ray) (with Cash and J. Biggs)	Tag team match	06:59
6	Vampiro defeated Fit Finlay	Falls Count Anywhere match	08:38
7	The Harris Brothers (Ron and Don) defeated The Mamalukes (Big Vito and Johnny the Bull) (c) (with Disco Inferno)	Tag team match for the WCW World Tag Team Championship	08:45
8	Dustin Rhodes defeated Terry Funk	Bullrope match	09:01
9	Sting defeated The Total Package (with Elizabeth)	Lumberjack match	07:01
10	Sid Vicious (c) defeated Jeff Jarrett	Singles match for the WCW World Heavyweight Championship	07:37
11	Hulk Hogan defeated Ric Flair	Yappapi Indian Strap match	14:28
(c) / – the champion(s) heading into the match
