= Uncensored (1998) =

1998 World Championship Wrestling pay-per-view event

- VHS cover featuring Hollywood Hogan and Randy Savage
- Promotion: World Championship Wrestling
- Brand(s): WCW nWo
- Date: March 15, 1998
- City: Mobile, Alabama
- Venue: Mobile Civic Center
- Attendance: 7,475
- Buy rate: 415,000
- Tagline: Rules Are For Fools

Pay-per-view chronology
| ← Previous; SuperBrawl VIII | Next → Spring Stampede |

Uncensored chronology
| ← Previous; 1997 | Next → 1999 |

The 1998 Uncensored was the fourth Uncensored professional wrestling pay-per-view (PPV) event produced by World Championship Wrestling (WCW). The event took place on March 15, 1998, from the Mobile Civic Center in Mobile, Alabama.

Nine matches were contested at the event. In the main event, Hollywood Hogan and Randy Savage fought to a no contest in a steel cage match. In other prominent matches, Sting retained his WCW World Heavyweight Championship against Scott Hall, Bret Hart defeated Curt Henning, The Giant defeated Kevin Nash by disqualification, and Diamond Dallas Page defeated Raven and Chris Benoit in a triangle match to retain the WCW United States Heavyweight Championship.

The event generated 415,000 ppv buys.

== Storylines ==
The event featured professional wrestling matches that involve different wrestlers from pre-existing scripted feuds and storylines. Professional wrestlers portray villains, heroes, or less distinguishable characters in the scripted events that build tension and culminate in a wrestling match or series of matches.

The primary storyline featured the ongoing dissension between Hollywood Hogan and Randy Savage of the nWo. The two had been feuding openly with each other for the previous two months, which came to a head at SuperBrawl VIII. After Hogan directed members of the nWo not to assist Savage in his match against Lex Luger, Savage retaliated by costing Hogan his match with Sting for the vacant WCW World Heavyweight Championship. Hogan finally had enough and challenged Savage to a steel cage match at Uncensored which he accepted.

In the meantime, the World Heavyweight Championship's resolution meant that Scott Hall would finally receive a shot at the championship. Hall had initially earned the championship opportunity by winning the 60-man, three-ring battle royal at World War 3 in November 1997. As per the stipulation of the match, Hall was initially to receive his title shot at SuperBrawl. Due to the circumstances surrounding the vacating of the title, however, he was not able to take the opportunity until the new champion was crowned.

== Event ==
Other on-screen personnel
| Role: | Name: |
|---|---|
| Commentators | Tony Schiavone |
| Commentators | Bobby Heenan |
| Commentators | Mike Tenay |
| Interviewer | Gene Okerlund |
| Ring announcers | Michael Buffer |
| Ring announcers | David Penzer |
| Referees | Randy Anderson |
| Referees | Mickie Henson |
| Referees | Charles Robinson |
| Referees | Nick Patrick |
| Referees | Billy Silverman |

During the opening match, Booker T pinned Eddie Guerrero when he knocked Guerrero off the top rope followed by a missile dropkick. After the match, Eddie accused his nephew Chavo Guerrero Jr. of being on Booker T's side. Eddie then attacked Chavo from behind, while he was walking up the aisle.

In the next match Juventud Guerrera defeated Konnan. During the match, Raven's Flock was shown sitting ringside.

Chris Jericho then retained the WCW Cruiserweight Championship against Dean Malenko, by submission with the Liontamer. Following the match Gene Okerlund came out to interview Malenko. Okerlund reminded Malenko that he lost his matches during four consecutive PPVs, and asked where Malenko would go from here, to which Malenko responded "home."

Following this match Lex Luger defeated Scott Steiner.

In a triple threat match for the WCW United States Heavyweight Championship, Diamond Dallas Page retained his title against both Raven and Chris Benoit. Benoit laid Page on a table in the ring, with the intention of superplexing Raven onto Page. Page knocked Benoit off the top rope and then pinned Raven following a Diamond Cutter through the table.

In the next match The Giant wrestled Kevin Nash. Nash was ultimately disqualified after Brian Adams hit The Giant in the back with a baseball bat.

Following this match, Bret Hart defeated Curt Hennig via submission with the Sharpshooter.

The second to last match was for the WCW World Heavyweight Championship. During this match Sting defeated Scott Hall via pinfall following a Scorpion Death Drop.

During the main event steel cage match between Hollywood Hogan and Randy Savage, The Disciple interfered, knocking both referees out and stopping Savage from assaulting Hogan. Savage then attacked Sting, who interfered on his behalf, and spat at Hogan before leaving the ring.

The event drew a PPV buyrate of 1.10 with 415,000 estimated purchases, making it the third most purchased WCW PPV event of 1998 (joint with WCW Superbrawl 98 that was held the month before).

== Reception ==
In 2013, Jack Bramma of 411Mania gave the event a rating of 7.0 [Good], stating, "Lots of highs and lows here. Heel Eddie and the ascendence of DDP as arguably number 2 face in the company behind Sting are always worth checking out. The beginning of the Dean Malenko teased retirement angle is perfect and Bret-Perfect is a very solid match. But the nWo stinks as usual and even the storylines were weak this time around with Nash-Giant having no blowoff and Scotty-Rick going nowhere and Macho re-turning heel to stay 4 life are unsatisfying messes.Still, six matches ***+ is worth sitting through the prima donna crap."

In 2025, Scott Steiner told Chris Van Vliet that Hulk Hogan behind-the-scenes held influence over his first loss after turning heel. This loss for Steiner, who turned heel and joined the NWO at Superbrawl VIII on February 22, 1998, would in fact be his match to Luger at Uncensored 1998.

== Results ==
| No. | Results | Stipulations | Times |
|---|---|---|---|
| 1 | Booker T (c) defeated Eddie Guerrero (with Chavo Guerrero Jr.) | Singles match the WCW World Television Championship | 11:08 |
| 2 | Juventud Guerrera defeated Konnan | Singles match | 10:21 |
| 3 | Chris Jericho (c) defeated Dean Malenko | Singles match for the WCW Cruiserweight Championship | 14:42 |
| 4 | Lex Luger defeated Scott Steiner | Singles match | 03:53 |
| 5 | Diamond Dallas Page (c) defeated Raven and Chris Benoit | Triangle match for the WCW United States Heavyweight Championship | 15:53 |
| 6 | The Giant defeated Kevin Nash by disqualification | Singles match | 06:36 |
| 7 | Bret Hart defeated Curt Hennig (with Rick Rude) | Singles match | 13:51 |
| 8 | Sting (c) defeated Scott Hall (with Dusty Rhodes) | Singles match for the WCW World Heavyweight Championship | 08:28 |
| 9 | Hollywood Hogan vs. Randy Savage (with Miss Elizabeth) ended in a no contest | Steel Cage match | 15:20 |
(c) / – the champion(s) heading into the match
