= Uncensored (1999) =

1999 World Championship Wrestling pay-per-view event

- VHS cover featuring Hollywood Hogan and Ric Flair
- Promotion: World Championship Wrestling
- Date: March 14, 1999
- City: Louisville, Kentucky
- Venue: Freedom Hall
- Attendance: 15,930
- Buy rate: 325,000
- Tagline(s): No Rules. No Mercy. No Way Out. Ric Flair And Hollywood Hogan In A Cage Match To Decide The Future of WCW!

Pay-per-view chronology
← Previous; SuperBrawl IX	Next → Spring Stampede

Uncensored chronology
← Previous; 1998	Next → 2000

The 1999 Uncensored was the fifth Uncensored professional wrestling pay-per-view (PPV) event produced by World Championship Wrestling (WCW). The event took place on March 14, 1999, from Freedom Hall in Louisville, Kentucky.

Nine matches were contested at the event. In the main event, Ric Flair defeated Hollywood Hogan in a Barbed Wire Steel Cage First Blood match to win the WCW World Heavyweight Championship and become President of WCW for life. In other prominent matches, Booker T defeated Scott Steiner to win the WCW World Television Championship, Perry Saturn defeated Chris Jericho in a Dog Collar match, and Chris Benoit and Dean Malenko defeated Curt Hennig and Barry Windham in a Lumberjack match to win the WCW World Tag Team Championship.

== Storylines ==
The event featured professional wrestling matches that involve different wrestlers from pre-existing scripted feuds and storylines. Professional wrestlers portray villains, heroes, or less distinguishable characters in the scripted events that build tension and culminate in a wrestling match or series of matches.

== Event ==
Other on-screen personnel
Role:	Name:
Commentators	Tony Schiavone
Commentators	Bobby Heenan
Commentators	Mike Tenay
Interviewer	Gene Okerlund
Ring announcers	David Penzer
Ring announcers	Michael Buffer
Referees	Johnny Boone
Referees	Scott Dickinson
Referees	Mickie Jay
Referees	Charles Robinson
Referees	Billy Silverman

During the opening match for the WCW Cruiserweight Championship, Billy Kidman retained his championship against Mikey Whipwreck, in his debut match, following a Shooting Star Press. The second match saw Stevie Ray defeated Vincent in Harlem Street Fight for leadership of nWo Black and White.

During the next match, Kevin Nash defeated Rey Misterio Jr. Lex Luger tripped Mysterio from ringside, which enabled Nash to hit a powerbomb for the pin. Following this, Jerry Flynn defeated Ernest Miller and Sonny Onoo in a handicap match. Following this, Hardcore Hak defeated Bam Bam Bigelow and Raven in a falls count anywhere match via pinfall after Raven's sister Chastity hit Raven with a fire extinguisher.

The next match was a lumberjack match for the WCW World Tag Team Championship. Chris Benoit and Dean Malenko defeated Curt Hennig and Barry Windham for the championship. After Hennig knocked Arn Anderson off the ring apron, Anderson hit Hennig in the back of the head with a tire iron. Benoit following this up with a diving headbutt for the pin. The lumberjacks for the match, which all held leather straps, were: Norman Smiley, Hugh Morrus, Meng, Kenny Kaos, Arn Anderson, Kendall Windham, Bobby Duncum Jr. and Prince Iaukea.

Perry Saturn next defeated Chris Jericho in a dog collar match.

In the WCW World Television Championship match, Booker T defeated Scott Steiner, to win the championship. Buff Bagwell, who had been with Steiner at ringside, accidentally hit Steiner with a steel chair, enabling Booker T to pick up the win via pinfall.

The main event was a barbed wire steel cage first blood match for the WCW World Heavyweight Championship. Prior to the match, Flair agreed that should Hogan win, Flair would retire, however if Flair would win, he would be named WCW President for life. Ric Flair ultimately pinned Hollywood Hogan while an unconscious Hogan was in the Figure-Four leglock. David Flair and Torrie Wilson came to the ring and attempted to hand Hogan a tire iron, which provoked Arn Anderson to attack David Flair. Flair, who had gained control of WCW for 90 days on a December 1998 edition of WCW Monday Nitro, ordered referee Charles Robinson to use discretion in stopping the match; as a result, Robinson did not stop the match when Flair bled first, nor would he count for Hogan's own pin falls. Charles Robinson made a fast three count to give the match to Flair.

== Reception ==
In 2012, Jack Bramma of 411Mania gave the event a rating of 4.5 [Poor], stating, "Another bad show even if it's not the crime against humanity that is Uncensored 95. You got a solid tag match and Whipwreck throwing out all the stops to make a good impression on his first match but there's just so much trash here. Stay away for the most part."

The event generated 325,000 ppv buys.

== Results ==
No.	Results	Stipulations	Times
1	Billy Kidman (c) defeated Mikey Whipwreck by pinfall	Singles match for the WCW Cruiserweight Championship	14:57
2	Stevie Ray defeated Vincent by pinfall	Harlem Street Fight for leadership of nWo Black and White	06:30
3	Kevin Nash (with Lex Luger and Miss Elizabeth) defeated Rey Misterio Jr. by pinfall	Singles match	06:19
4	Jerry Flynn defeated Ernest Miller and Sonny Onoo by pinfall	Handicap match	07:08
5	Hak defeated Bam Bam Bigelow and Raven (with Chastity) by pinfall	Falls Count Anywhere match	14:29
6	Chris Benoit and Dean Malenko defeated Curt Hennig and Barry Windham (c) by pinfall	Lumberjack match for the WCW World Tag Team Championship	15:58
7	Perry Saturn defeated Chris Jericho by pinfall	Dog Collar match	11:50
8	Booker T defeated Scott Steiner (c) (with Buff Bagwell) by pinfall	Singles match for the WCW World Television Championship	13:30
9	Ric Flair defeated Hollywood Hogan (c)	Barbed Wire Steel Cage First Blood match for the WCW World Heavyweight Championship (Note: Since Flair won, he became President of WCW, but had he lost, he would have had to retire.)	14:19
(c) / – the champion(s) heading into the match
