= Dean Malenko =

American professional wrestler (born 1960)

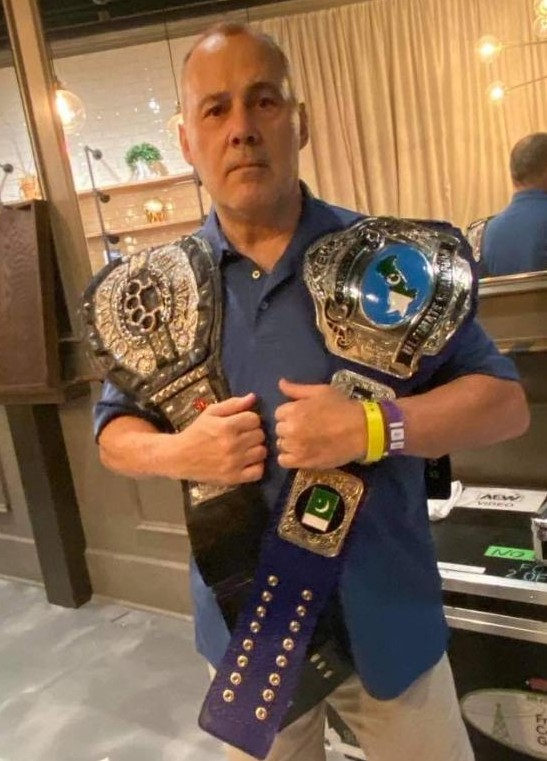
- Malenko in 2019

Personal information
- Born: Dean Shelly Simon; August 4, 1960 (age 66) Irvington, New Jersey, U.S.
- Spouse: Julie Hittinger (m. 1996)
- Children: 3
- Family: Boris Malenko (father); Joe Malenko (older brother)

Professional wrestling career
- Ring name(s): Ciclope; Dean Malenko; Dean Sarcoff
- Billed height: 5 ft 10 in (178 cm)
- Billed weight: 212 lb (96 kg)
- Billed from: Tampa, Florida
- Trained by: Boris Malenko
- Debut: February 18, 1985
- Retired: December 11, 2001

Dean Shelly Simon (born August 4, 1960), better known by the ring name Dean Malenko, is an American retired professional wrestler. He is signed with All Elite Wrestling (AEW) as a senior producer. He is best known for his time in World Championship Wrestling as a wrestler and World Wrestling Federation (WWF, now WWE) as a wrestler and a road agent and New Japan Pro-Wrestling (NJPW).

Although never a world champion, Malenko achieved championship success in ECW, WCW and the WWF, winning 11 total titles across the three organizations. Pro Wrestling Illustrated named Malenko the #1 wrestler in the world in 1997, and he was inducted into the Hardcore Hall of Fame in 2015. He has been described by commentators as one of the most underrated wrestlers of all time. Multiple-time world champion Bryan Danielson said that his "number one guy, growing up, was Dean Malenko". Following his retirement as an in-ring competitor, he worked as a road agent for WWE from 2001 until 2019.

== Professional wrestling career ==
=== Early career (1979–1988) ===
Malenko was born into a wrestling family, and his father Boris Malenko was a prominent wrestling figure. He started out as a referee in the Tampa, Florida area and worked briefly as a referee for the World Wrestling Federation in the mid-1980s. He has wrestled all over the world and has spent much time wrestling in Mexico and Japan. He wrestled with his brother Joe Malenko from 1988 to 1992, forming a tag team working in Puerto Rico, Japan, and Australia until his brother retired. On January 24, 1992, Malenko defeated "The Superstar" for the Suncoast Pro Wrestling (SPW) Southern title in Palmetto, Florida. Dean Malenko defeated Jimmy Backlund for the ICWA Light Heavyweight title on March 12, 1992, in Tampa. Then, Malenko teamed with his brother losing to Ricky Steamboat and Nikita Koloff at Clash of the Champions XIX.

=== All Japan Pro Wrestling (1988–1992) ===
In February 1988, Malenko debuted in All Japan Pro Wrestling (AJPW) alongside his brother Joe Malenko. Over the following four years, the Malenko Brothers wrestled multiple tours with AJPW, facing teams such as the British Bulldogs, Dory Funk Jr. and Terry Funk, Footloose, and the Can-Am Express. In July 1989, the brothers wrestled one another in a bout for Joe Malenko's World Junior Heavyweight Championship, with Joe prevailing. They made their final appearances in the promotion in June 1992.

=== New Japan Pro-Wrestling (1992–1997, 1999) ===
In October 1992, Malenko debuted in New Japan Pro-Wrestling (NJPW), where he formed a tag team with Pegasus Kid/Wild Pegasus. In late 1992 and early 1993, they had a series of matches against El Samurai and Jushin Thunder Liger. In May to June 1993, Malenko competed in the Top of the Super Juniors tournament; he was successful in the first round, but was eliminated in the second round by El Samurai.

In April 1994, Malenko competed in the Super J-Cup, being eliminated in the first round by Gedo. In May to June 1994, he competed in the Best of the Super Juniors tournament, placing sixth with twelve points. In October 1994, he and Tokimitsu Ishizawa entered the Super Grade Junior Heavyweight Tag League, losing to Shinjiro Otani and Wild Pegasus in the semi-finals.

In June to July 1995, Malenko again entered the Best of the Super Juniors tournament, placing joint second with nine points. In May to June 1996, he once again entered the Best of the Super Juniors tournament, placing fourth in block B.

Malenko made his final appearances in NJPW in October 1999 as part of its Fall in Black tour, reforming his tag team with Wild Pegasus to defeat El Samurai and Liger.

=== Eastern Championship Wrestling / Extreme Championship Wrestling (1994–1995) ===
On August 27, 1994, Malenko debuted in Eastern Championship Wrestling (ECW) as a heel participating in a professional wrestling tournament for the vacant NWA World Heavyweight Championship. He defeated Osamu Nishimura in the quarterfinals before he ended up losing to the eventual winner Shane Douglas in the semifinals. Malenko became known as "The Shooter" and was given a gimmick similar to an Ultimate Fighting Championship fighter (due to his resemblance to Royce Gracie). On November 4, 1994, he defeated 2 Cold Scorpio to win his first ECW Television Championship.

In the beginning of 1995, Malenko formed a faction called the Triple Threat with Chris Benoit and Shane Douglas. On February 25, 1995, at Return of the Funker, Benoit and Malenko defeated Sabu and Tazmaniac for the ECW Tag Team Championship, making Malenko a double champion. A month later at Extreme Warfare, Malenko dropped the Television title to 2 Cold Scorpio. On April 8 at Three Way Dance, he and Benoit lost the tag titles to The Public Enemy (Johnny Grunge and Rocco Rock).

In the summer of 1995, Malenko feuded with TV Champion Eddie Guerrero, culminating in a match on July 21 where Malenko defeated Guerrero to win his second ECW Television Championship. Only a week later, Malenko dropped the title back to Guerrero. The two continued to battle over the Television Title and fought a series of matches that led to them being offered a WCW contract. His last ECW match was a two out of three falls match against Guerrero, which took place on August 26. The match ended in a draw as the last fall had both men's shoulders on the mat. This would be both men's last match in ECW and they both gave—and received—an emotional farewell to the fans.

=== World Championship Wrestling (1995–2000) ===
==== Cruiserweight Champion; United States Heavyweight Champion (1995–1998) ====
In September 1995, Malenko and Benoit joined World Championship Wrestling (WCW), where he continued to be a villain. Malenko came to be known in WCW as "The Iceman" Dean Malenko because of his cold, calculating demeanor and was also given the nickname of "The Man of 1,000 Holds". On May 2, 1996, Malenko defeated Shinjiro Otani for the WCW Cruiserweight Championship in Orlando. He held the title for two months, making successful defenses against the likes of Brad Armstrong, Rey Mysterio Jr. and Disco Inferno before losing the title to Mysterio on the July, 8 edition of Nitro. He defeated Mysterio Jr. for his second WCW Cruiserweight Championship at Halloween Havoc 1996.

After a successful title defense against Psychosis at World War 3, Malenko lost the Cruiserweight title to Ultimate Dragon (Último Dragón) at Starrcade 1996 where Dragón's J-Crown Championship was also on the line. Malenko defeated Dragón on the January 22, 1997 Clash of the Champions XXXIV to win his third WCW Cruiserweight Championship. He would hold the belt for nearly a month before losing it to Syxx at SuperBrawl VII. Malenko lost the match after Eddie Guerrero inadvertently caused Malenko to be hit with Guerrero's United States Title belt.

Malenko then entered a feud with Guerrero, angry over the fact that he had caused him to lose his Cruiserweight belt and began to attempt to win the United States title from him. The match between the two took place at Uncensored the next month and interference from Syxx played a role again. The Cruiserweight Champion again tried to take Guerrero's title, but in the process dropped the camcorder he carried to the ring with him. After Guerrero took the belt back, Malenko hit him in the back of the head with the camcorder and knocked the champion out, enabling him to pin Guerrero and win his first United States Championship. He retained the belt at Slamboree on May 18, 1997, by defeating Jeff Jarrett, but lost the title to him on the June 9, 1997, episode of Nitro. At World War 3, Malenko participated in a 60-man, three-ring battle royal won by The Giant. At Starrcade 1997, he challenged Guerrero for the Cruiserweight Title but ended up losing the match.

In mid-1998, Malenko engaged in a heated feud with Chris Jericho. To better Malenko's claims, Jericho boasted that he was "The Man of 1,004 Holds" and the two had a final showdown at Uncensored 1998 for the Cruiserweight title. After a long match, Jericho forced Malenko to submit in an angled Liontamer. After the match, the otherwise collected Malenko was left in an unusual fit of frustration. Gene Okerlund then confronted Malenko post-match, aggressively citing his many losses in the past several months and asking where he would go from this point. Dejected and worn down, Malenko replied simply, "Home," and would not be seen on WCW TV for two months. In the ensuing two months, Jericho proceeded to mercilessly taunt Malenko, including insulting Malenko's father and attacking Malenko's brother. At Slamboree 1998, Jericho held a Battle Royal for a shot at his Cruiserweight Championship. Malenko entered the battle royal dressed as masked wrestler Ciclope and won the match, after Juventud Guerrera shook his hand, and eliminated himself. He then unmasked, revealing himself to the crowd following his win. Malenko went on to defeat Jericho for his fourth and final WCW Cruiserweight Championship, thus becoming the first-ever wrestler to win the Cruiserweight title four times. Malenko was stripped of the title, however, as he did not earn the title shot as himself. At The Great American Bash 1998, Malenko and Jericho faced each other in a match for the vacant Cruiserweight title. Malenko lost by disqualification, making Jericho the champion. At Bash at the Beach 1998, Malenko interfered in Jericho's title defense against Rey Mysterio Jr. allowing Mysterio to pin Jericho for the title. The title was returned to Jericho, however, because of interference by Malenko. Malenko was fired in storyline, but returned at Road Wild 1998 as the special guest referee during Jericho's defense against Juventud Guerrera. Juventud won the match and the title.

==== The Four Horsemen; The Revolution (1998–2000) ====
In September 1998, Malenko became a part of the final incarnation of Ric Flair's Four Horsemen faction. They feuded with the New World Order (nWo), particularly Eric Bischoff. Malenko and Benoit also battled The West Texas Rednecks (Curt Hennig and Barry Windham) during this period. At SuperBrawl IX, they lost to the Rednecks in the finals of a tag team tournament for the vacant World Tag Team Championship. At Uncensored 1999, however, they defeated the Rednecks in a lumberjack match to win the WCW World Tag Team Championship. Two weeks later, they lost the titles to Rey Mysterio Jr. and Billy Kidman.

After the Horsemen were finally disbanded in May 1999 due to Flair's abuse of power, Malenko joined up with Shane Douglas' faction, The Revolution, which was formed in July 1999. They feuded with David Flair, Diamond Dallas Page and Chris Kanyon. At Bash at the Beach (1999), Malenko challenged David for the US title but lost the match. They battled many teams throughout the year including West Texas Rednecks, First Family, The Filthy Animals and The Varsity Club.

Malenko's last WCW match was a "catch-as-catch-can" match with Billy Kidman at Souled Out in January 2000. Early on, Malenko instinctively left the ring to regroup and was disqualified under the match stipulations because his feet hit the arena floor.

=== World Wrestling Federation / World Wrestling Entertainment / WWE (2000–2019) ===
==== The Radicalz; Light Heavyweight Champion (2000–2001) ====
After being granted his release from WCW the night after his last WCW match, Malenko signed with the World Wrestling Federation (WWF) and debuted during the Attitude Era on January 31, 2000, edition of Raw Is War. Malenko first appeared in the crowd with the infamous Radicalz – himself, Eddie Guerrero, Chris Benoit, and Perry Saturn – who all made exits from WCW at the same time. While not having as much success in the WWF, Malenko was a force in the promotion's light heavyweight division. Along with Guerrero, Benoit, and Saturn, he had some measure of success as part of The Radicalz. On the March 13 edition of Raw Is War, Malenko defeated Essa Rios for his first Light Heavyweight Championship. In April 2000, he feuded with Scotty 2 Hotty who was the new challenger for his Light Heavyweight title. He dropped the title to Scotty on the April 17 edition of Raw Is War before he won his second WWF Light Heavyweight Championship from Scotty on the April 27 episode of SmackDown!. At Backlash 2000, Malenko successfully defended the title against Scotty, thus ending the feud between the two.

Later that year, with Benoit having drifted away from the group, Malenko engaged in a feud with Guerrero and Saturn which stemmed from Guerrero's on-screen relationship with Chyna and a number of losses suffered when working as a tag team with Saturn. The feud led to a triple threat match at Judgment Day 2000 where Guerrero retained the WWF European Championship against both Malenko and Saturn. After a brief absence from TV, Malenko returned to reform The Radicalz with Guerrero, Benoit, and Saturn. Around this time, Malenko briefly became known as "Double Ho Seven", a parody of the fictional character, James Bond. The gimmick was born out of a match with The Godfather, who offered one of his female escorts to Malenko instead of wrestling him. Malenko gladly accepted his opponent's offer. As Double Ho Seven, Malenko competed for the affections of Lita and feuded with her tag team the Hardy Boyz. He even offered Lita a title match for his Light Heavyweight Championship, but under the condition that if she lost she would be obliged to go on a date with him. Lita accepted and almost caught Malenko by a few nearfalls throughout the match, but in the end lost the match by submitting to his signature Cloverleaf.

Malenko's feud with the Hardy Boyz and Lita continued in early 2001, culminating with Lita pinning him (with some assistance from Matt Hardy) in a match on the February 19, 2001, edition of Raw Is War. He also briefly feuded with Jacqueline and Ivory, who were disgusted by his lecherous ways. A title feud with Crash Holly would begin after Crash interfered in a two-on-one intergender handicap match between Malenko, and both Jacqueline and Ivory, costing him the match. After both Guerrero and Benoit drifted away from the Radicalz, Malenko teamed with Saturn for a few weeks before quietly disappearing off television as the WCW/ECW Invasion storyline began in summer 2001.

==== Retirement (2001–2019) ====
Malenko's third-last wrestling match took place at the 4th Annual Brian Pillman Memorial Show in August 2001, where he teamed with longtime friend Perry Saturn and defeated Raven and Justin Credible. That December, he defeated his student, Chad Collyer, by disqualification in the WWF farm promotion, the Heartland Wrestling Association, in what was Malenko's final match. Malenko appeared in the ring along with other WWE alumni during WWE Raw Homecoming on October 3, 2005.

His close friend Eddie Guerrero died on November 13, 2005, and Malenko made a special appearance on the November 14 edition of Raw alongside Chris Benoit. The following Friday on SmackDown!, Malenko once again appeared after a match between Chris Benoit and Triple H, and the three embraced. After the 2006 Royal Rumble, he was seen congratulating Rey Mysterio on his Rumble victory. At Vengeance: Night of Champions in June 2007, he appeared in a backstage segment watching Chavo Guerrero Jr.. The next night on the Chris Benoit memorial episode of Monday Night Raw, he talked about the life of Chris Benoit. He was very sad since two of his close friends, Eddie and Benoit, both died, but said he was happy that they were together again.

Malenko next appeared on the March 31, 2008, episode of Raw to join The Four Horsemen and other WWE superstars in a farewell tribute to Ric Flair. He made an appearance on the June 28, 2010, episode of Raw congratulating Ricky Steamboat on his DVD release. He and all the others in the ring were attacked by the Nexus. Malenko appeared along the rest of the WWE roster after the April 23, 2012, episode of Raw to celebrate John Cena's 35th birthday. In November 2015, Malenko was inducted into 2300 Arena Hardcore Hall of Fame. On the September 11, 2017, episode of Raw, Malenko made a brief backstage appearance alongside Jamie Noble, where the two were seen as possible choices by Raw Tag Team Champions Seth Rollins and Dean Ambrose as their partners for an eight-man tag-team match, but were quickly dismissed. On the June 5, 2018, episode of Smackdown Live, Malenko appeared during the contract signing between AJ Styles and Shinsuke Nakamura.

On April 26, 2019, Malenko and WWE ended their working relationship. This came after Malenko was a road agent for them for the previous 18 years. Pro Wrestling Insider would later report that he did not do anything wrong, WWE was just in the process of cycling out some of the older agents, due to the recent signings of multiple new agents.

=== All Elite Wrestling (2019–present) ===
On May 24, 2019, All Elite Wrestling (AEW) announced that Malenko had joined them as a senior producer. Malenko makes occasional on-screen appearances. He made an appearance in Philadelphia following the October 8, 2021, edition of Rampage when Tony Khan called him out alongside Jerry Lynn, Taz and Chris Jericho to thank them for inspiring him.

== Personal life ==
Simon is Jewish. He and his wife Julie have three children.

Simon had a heart attack in the latter half of 2010, but was back at work by Survivor Series on November 21. In November 2013, he was taken to a hospital and later sent home from a WWE European tour after suffering chest pains. In 2019, Simon revealed that he had been diagnosed with Parkinson's disease.

His daughter Lacey, also known as “Marie Malenko” and “Kenzie”, is a professional wrestler who made her debut on February 2, 2026, at Pro Wrestling Noah's Monday Magic show. In the same month, Lacey attended a WWE tryout and was reportedly signed a deal with the promotion in March.

== Championships and accomplishments ==
- DDT Pro-Wrestling
  - Ironman Heavymetalweight Championship (1 time)
- Extreme Championship Wrestling
  - ECW World Television Championship (2 times)
  - ECW World Tag Team Championship (1 time) – with Chris Benoit
- Global Wrestling Alliance
  - GWA Tag Team Championship (1 time) – with Joe Malenko
- Hardcore Hall of Fame
  - Class of 2015
- International Championship Wrestling Association
  - ICWA Light Heavyweight Championship (1 time)
- Pro Wrestling Illustrated
  - Ranked No. 1 in the top 500 singles wrestlers in the PWI 500 in 1997
  - Ranked No. 161 of the top 500 singles wrestlers in the "PWI Years" in 2003
- REW - Revolution Eastern Wrestling
  - REW Pakistan Championship (1 time)
- Suncoast Pro Wrestling
  - SPW Southern Heavyweight Championship (1 time)
- World Championship Wrestling
  - WCW Cruiserweight Championship (4 times)
  - WCW United States Heavyweight Championship (1 time)
  - WCW World Tag Team Championship (1 time) – with Chris Benoit
- World Wrestling Federation
  - WWF Light Heavyweight Championship (2 times)
- Wrestling Observer Newsletter awards
  - Feud of the Year (1995) vs. Eddie Guerrero
  - Best Technical Wrestler (1996, 1997)

== See also ==
- List of Jewish professional wrestlers
