= Tony Schiavone =

American professional wrestling commentator, podcaster, and sports announcer (born 1957)

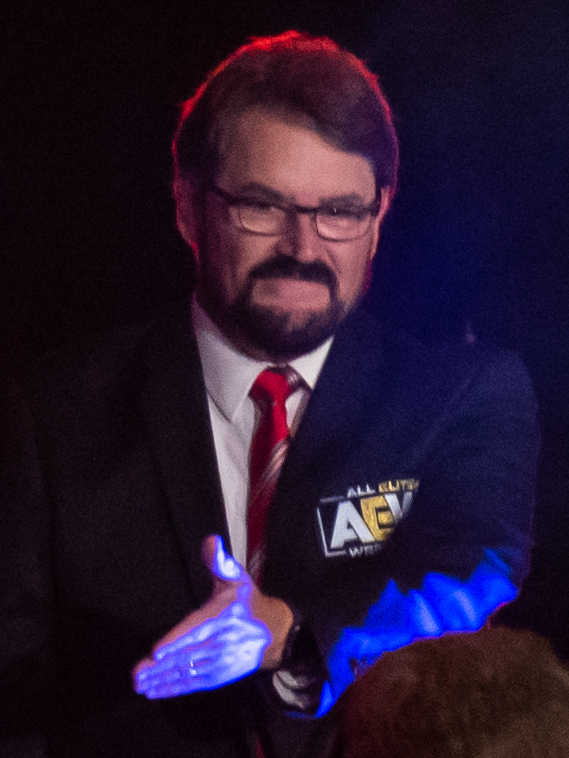
- Schiavone in 2019
- Born: Noah Anthony Schiavone; November 7, 1957 (age 68); Craigsville, Virginia, U.S.
- Education: James Madison University (BS)
- Employers: Jim Crockett Promotions (1983–1989; 2022); Titan Sports/WWF (1989–1990); World Championship Wrestling (1990–2001); Major League Wrestling (2017–2019); All Elite Wrestling (2019–present)
- Spouse: Lois June Berger (m. 1981)
- Children: 5
- Professional wrestling career
- Billed height: 5 ft 10 in (178 cm)
- Billed weight: 187 lb (85 kg)
- Debut: 1983

YouTube information
- Channel: What Happened When with Tony Schiavone
- Years active: 2018–present
- Genre: Professional wrestling
- Subscribers: 42.6 thousand
- Views: 9.6 million
- Last updated: February 19, 2026

Noah Anthony Schiavone (/ʃəˈvɒni/ shə-VON-ee; born November 7, 1957) is an American sports announcer, professional wrestling commentator and podcaster. He is signed to All Elite Wrestling (AEW) where he serves as a senior producer and the play-by-play commentator for Collision, and formerly color commentator for Dynamite and Rampage. He has previously worked for Jim Crockett Promotions, the World Wrestling Federation (WWF, now WWE), World Championship Wrestling (WCW), and Major League Wrestling (MLW). In addition to his work in wrestling, Schiavone has also worked as a broadcaster for the Gwinnett Braves/Stripers of Minor League Baseball and Georgia Bulldogs football.

In 2013, WWE noted that, "At the height of the Monday Night War, veteran broadcaster Tony Schiavone's voice was as vital to the onscreen product of World Championship Wrestling as Jim Ross' Oklahoma growl was to WWE."

In 2021, Schiavone announced a Kickstarter campaign for a biographical graphic novel titled Butts in Seats: The Tony Schiavone Story. Tony Schiavone can be heard on his podcast What Happened When? with Conrad Thompson.

== Early life and education ==
Schiavone was born and raised in Craigsville, Virginia, the son of Noah and Rebecca Schiavone. He is of Italian descent. He graduated from Buffalo Gap High School and earned a Bachelor of Science degree in communications from James Madison University in 1980.

== Broadcasting career ==
=== Early career ===
Schiavone began his broadcasting career calling high school football games for WTON in Staunton, Virginia. After graduating from JMU, Schiavone became the play-by-play announcer for the Greensboro Hornets of the South Atlantic League. After a year in Greensboro, he joined the Charlotte O's, which were owned by the Crockett family. Schiavone, who was a wrestling fan and needed extra money to support his growing family, lobbied the Crocketts for work on their wrestling programming.

=== Professional wrestling ===
==== Jim Crockett Promotions (1983–1989) ====
Schiavone's first on-air appearance for Jim Crockett Promotions was a 1983 interview with Ric Flair. In 1985, he left baseball to join Jim Crockett Promotions full-time. From 1985 to 1989, Schiavone and David Crockett hosted NWA's World Championship Wrestling live in front of a small in-studio audience in Atlanta. The show aired on TBS on Saturdays at 9am and 6:05pm and was used as a vehicle to promote live NWA arena events and introduce their stars to a national audience as TBS was the premier nationally broadcast cable station at the time.

==== World Wrestling Federation (1989–1990) ====
He was signed by Vince McMahon's WWF for a one-year contract from April 1989 through April 1990. During his time with the company, he was most notable for being the main play-by-play announcer for their SummerSlam 1989 and Royal Rumble 1990 pay-per-views alongside Jesse "The Body" Ventura. Other than Ventura (with whom he would also frequently partner later in WCW), Schiavone commentated alongside others including Lord Alfred Hayes, Gorilla Monsoon, Hillbilly Jim, Rod Trongard, and Bobby "The Brain" Heenan. Behind the scenes, Tony produced numerous home videos for Coliseum Video.

Schiavone's family did not like living in Connecticut, so he accepted an offer from media mogul Ted Turner to work for World Championship Wrestling. He has remained on good terms with the McMahon family in the years since. Years after leaving the WWF he admitted that doing so was his biggest career mistake, and that he asked McMahon for his job back as soon as he realized what the Turner Broadcasting System had done to the former Jim Crockett Promotions upon acquiring it. McMahon turned him down, so that Schiavone would not have to move his young family again, but was open to working with him in the future.

==== World Championship Wrestling (1990–2001) ====
Schiavone became the lead voice for WCW's flagship program, Monday Nitro. He also served as the lead announcer of Thunder, typically working alongside Mike Tenay, Bobby Heenan, Larry Zbyszko, and later with Mark Madden and Scott Hudson. Before the advent of Nitro and Thunder, Schiavone hosted WCW Saturday Night and WCW WorldWide. He made an appearance in the movie Ready to Rumble. When WCW's main assets were bought by the World Wrestling Federation (WWF, later WWE) in 2001, he was not retained by the WWF.

=== Various jobs (2001–2019) ===
After wrestling, Schiavone became the morning sports anchor for both WDUN in Gainesville and WSB-AM in Atlanta simultaneously, despite the two stations having different owners (WDUN has a partnership with Cox Media Group, which owns WSB-TV and WSB-AM.) Schiavone also has done morning sports reports for Cox sister stations WHIO AM/FM in Dayton, Ohio.

Schiavone is a writer for the Georgia Bulldogs Radio Network and produced the Best of the Bulldogs, which won the AP Award for Best Sports Program in 2004. He also hosts a post game talk show on the Georgia Bulldogs Radio Network alongside former University of Georgia quarterback David Greene.

From 2009 to 2019, Schiavone was the play-by-play announcer for the Atlanta Braves' AAA affiliate, the Gwinnett Braves.

Following cutbacks at WSB that resulted in Schiavone being let go in 2015, Schiavone took a part-time job at Starbucks to supplement his income while continuing to do other broadcasting work. Schiavone has stated he had no shame in working there and praised Starbucks for their excellent health insurance coverage for their employees. His time at Starbucks would be alluded to on multiple occasions by Britt Baker on AEW programming.

On January 30, 2017, Schiavone began hosting the What Happened When? podcast with co-host Conrad Thompson on MLW Radio discussing stories from Schiavone's time with Jim Crockett Promotions, his stint in the WWF and his WCW tenure. Schiavone also co-hosts the "Pro Wrestling Wednesday" podcast with lifelong wrestling fan Beau Le Blanc for WZGC FM 92.9 The Game in Atlanta, a station in which he often does fill-in work for their sports flash updates.

=== Return to professional wrestling (2017–present) ===
==== Major League Wrestling (2017–2019) ====
On October 5, 2017, Schiavone returned to professional wrestling at the inaugural event of the resurrected Major League Wrestling (MLW). At the show, Schiavone provided color commentary for the event's matches. He then continued to provide his commentary work for MLW's television show, MLW Fusion. After taking a break in early 2019 from commentating due to conflicting schedules, he returned in July 2019. Schiavone noted on the November 20, 2019 Clash of the Champions XIII episode of What Happened When with Conrad Thompson that he would no longer be appearing for MLW.

==== All Elite Wrestling (2019–present) ====
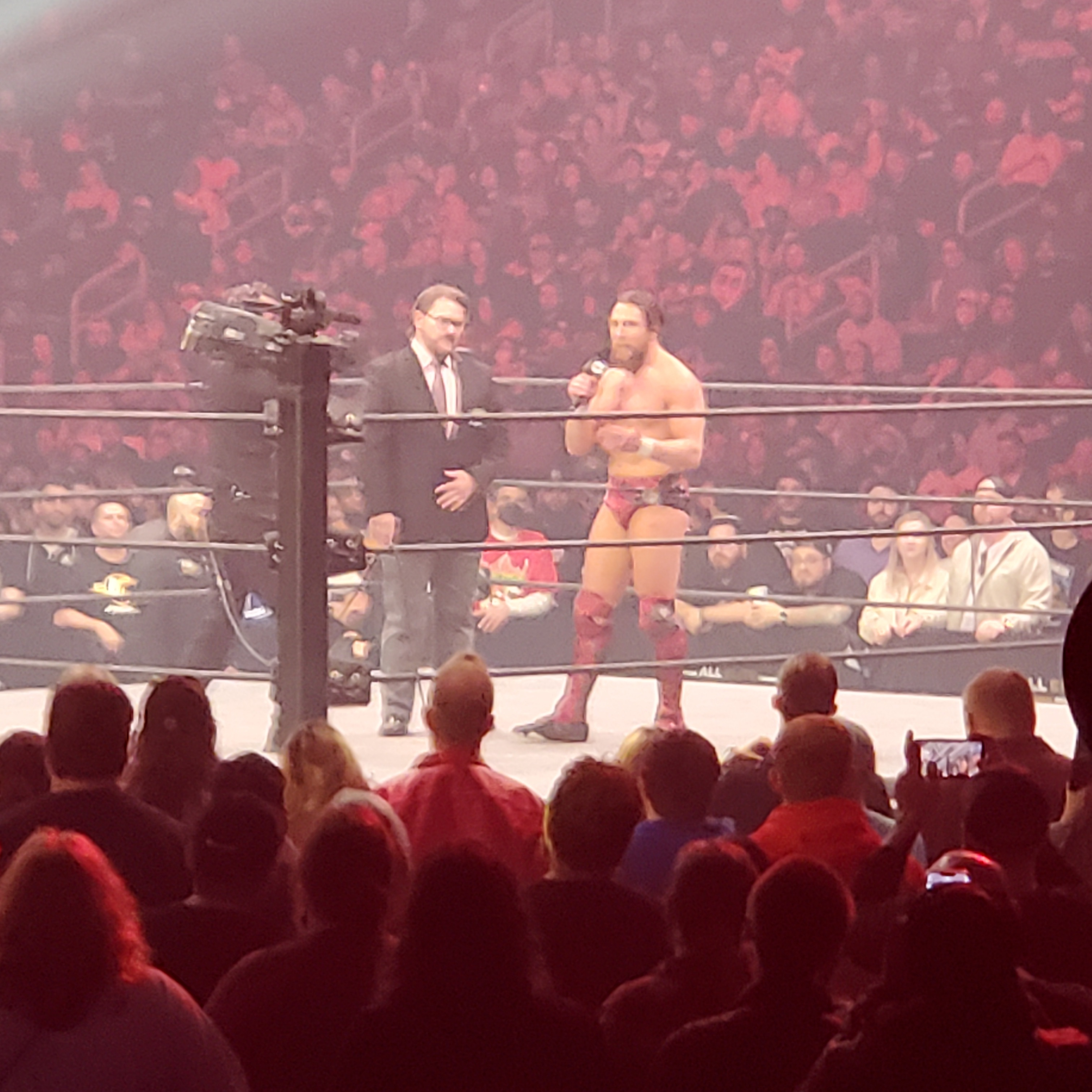
Schiavone interviewing Bryan Danielson during a 2021 taping of AEW Dynamite

In August 2019, it was reported that Schiavone had signed a contract with All Elite Wrestling (AEW). It was announced that Schiavone would join AEW as a commentator. Schiavone also began working as a senior producer for AEW live events.

On February 20, 2020, AEW and TNT launched AEW Unrestricted, a weekly podcast hosted by Schiavone and referee Aubrey Edwards.

On October 14, 2023, Schiavone debuted as the play-by-play announcer on Collision. He remains a member of the commentary team on Dynamite, while also conducting in-ring and backstage interviews with various professional wrestlers.

On The May 6, 2026 episode of Dynamite, Schiavone and Sting would pay tribute to former WCW owner Ted Turner, with both also leading Turner's ten bell salute.

== Controversies ==
=== Mick Foley incident ===
An infamous incident involving Schiavone occurred on the January 4, 1999, Nitro. Nitro was airing live against the pre-taped WWF Raw is War on USA Network and was to feature a rematch between WCW World Heavyweight Champion Kevin Nash and former champion Goldberg from Starrcade, where Nash had ended Goldberg's undefeated streak and taken his title under controversial circumstances. The Nitro episode was also the first appearance of "Hollywood" Hulk Hogan since he announced his "retirement" from professional wrestling on the Thanksgiving 1998 edition of The Tonight Show with Jay Leno. Meanwhile, Raw was to feature Mick Foley, who was wrestling as Mankind at the time and who had previously worked for WCW as Cactus Jack, winning his first WWF Championship in a match against The Rock. However, at the time Raw was taped while Nitro was live, and it was a practice for WCW and executive producer Eric Bischoff to spoil pre-taped Raw episodes, by telling the WCW audience the results of the Raw show, and not give fans reasons to change the channel.

According to Foley, who wrote about the incident in the first chapter of his book Foley is Good (and the Real World is Faker than Wrestling), this was to be a pivotal night for WCW as people believed that WCW, whose record streak of 83 consecutive Monday night wins in the ratings had been snapped by Raw in April 1998 and had only eight head-to-head wins after that, would turn the ratings tide back to them and potentially take over the lead in the Monday Night War. During the show Schiavone spoiled the result of Raw's main event by saying that Foley, the former Cactus Jack, would win, sarcastically remarking "That's gonna put some butts in the seats".

Foley was genuinely upset by what he had heard and telephoned Schiavone to talk about it. When Schiavone called Foley back, he told Foley that Bischoff had ordered him to reveal Foley's title win over the air. The strategy, however, backfired on Bischoff. Almost immediately after Schiavone spoiled Foley's title win, 600,000 households switched from Nitro to Raw, to watch Foley win the title. This was enough to give the WWF the ratings win for the night, with a 5.7 final rating to Nitro's 5.0. WCW's ratings never saw more than a 5.0 going head-to-head with Raw again and Nitro's rating sank below 5.0 and by the end of the year was struggling to stay above 3.0.

=== Bobby Heenan rivalry ===
In a 2002 interview, Schiavone was criticized by Bobby Heenan who claimed that Schiavone would hide finishes and angles from him and fellow Nitro commentator Mike Tenay during broadcasts, claiming Schiavone's key to life is "knowledge is power". Longtime wrestling broadcaster Gene Okerlund concurred with Heenan, and claimed that, while he liked Schiavone and did not have many problems with him, "Tony was the consummate politician" and "Tony watched out for Tony and in doing so, had a tendency to bury people along the way". One tense incident happened on the Nitro following the death of Heenan's longtime best friend Gorilla Monsoon, over Schiavone's alleged objection to Heenan paying tribute to Monsoon on air on the grounds that Monsoon had never worked for WCW or its predecessor organizations. Heenan was ultimately allowed to speak in honor of Monsoon, albeit only a small statement. Appearing on The Ross Report in 2014, Schiavone stated that he never objected to Heenan mentioning Monsoon, only that he asked Heenan if he had first asked WCW president Eric Bischoff about doing so. Schiavone accepted responsibility for the collapse of his relationship with Heenan, and said of Heenan's criticism of him: "I deserve it".

== Personal life ==
Schiavone and his wife, the former Lois June Berger, married in 1981 and are the parents of five children. They live in East Cobb, Georgia.

== Awards and accomplishments ==
- George Tragos/Lou Thesz Professional Wrestling Hall of Fame
  - Gordon Solie Award (2024)
- Wrestling Observer Newsletter
  - Worst Television Announcer (1999, 2000)

Preceded by Eric Bischoff	Nitro lead announcer 1996–2001	Succeeded by None
Preceded by Kevin Kelly	Collision lead announcer 2023–present	Succeeded by current
