= Slamboree '94: A Legends' Reunion =

1994 World Championship Wrestling pay-per-view event

- Promotional poster showing Ric Flair, Ray Stevens, Rick Rude, Verne Gagne, Big Van Vader, and Killer Kowalski
- Promotion: World Championship Wrestling
- Date: May 22, 1994
- City: Philadelphia, Pennsylvania, United States
- Venue: Philadelphia Civic Center
- Attendance: 4,000
- Buy rate: 105,000
- Tagline(s): A Legends' Reunion; A Night With the Classics... One Ring...One Moment...One Mega-Event!

Pay-per-view chronology
← Previous; Spring Stampede	Next → Bash at the Beach

Slamboree chronology
← Previous; 1993	Next → 1995

Slamboree '94: A Legends Reunion was the second Slamboree professional wrestling pay-per-view (PPV) event produced by World Championship Wrestling (WCW). It took place on May 22, 1994, at the Philadelphia Civic Center in Philadelphia, Pennsylvania in the United States.

Prior to Slamboree, WCW approached Eastern Championship Wrestling about cross-promoting with ECW's When Worlds Collide event, which was scheduled to take place in Philadelphia on May 14, 1994. The two promotions agreed to a talent exchange in which WCW wrestlers Arn Anderson and Bobby Eaton would appear at When Worlds Collide, while ECW wrestler Terry Funk would appear at Slamboree.

== Storylines ==
The event featured professional wrestling matches that involve different wrestlers from pre-existing scripted feuds and storylines. Professional wrestlers portray villains, heroes, or less distinguishable characters in the scripted events that build tension and culminate in a wrestling match or series of matches.

== Event ==
Other on-screen personnel
Role:	Name:
Commentator	Tony Schiavone
Commentator	Bobby Heenan
Commentator	Gordon Solie (Legends match)
Interviewer	Gene Okerlund
Interviewer	Jesse Ventura
Ring announcer	Gary Michael Cappetta
Ring announcer	Michael Buffer
Referees	Randy Anderson
Referees	Nick Patrick

Prior to the pay-per-view portion of the show WCW introduced a group of "legends" to the crowd: Ole Anderson, Penny Banner, Red Bastien, Tully Blanchard, The Crusher, Don Curtis, Terry Funk, Verne Gagne, Hard Boiled Haggerty, Larry Hennig, Killer Kowalski, Ernie Ladd, Wahoo McDaniel, Angelo Mosca, Harley Race, Ray Stevens, Lou Thesz, Johnny Weaver, Mr. Wrestling II, and Tommy Young. Later in the night The Assassin, Ole Anderson, Harley Race, Ernie Ladd, The Crusher, and Dick the Bruiser were inducted into the WCW Hall of Fame.

Cactus Jack replaced an injured Dave Sullivan in the WCW World Tag Team Championship match. Big Van Vader was originally scheduled to wrestle Rick Rude, but Rude had to be replaced by Sting as Rude had suffered a career-ending back injury in Japan, in a match against Sting.

This was also the final WCW pay per view where the traditional entrance ramp way connected to the ring was used. Although it was brought back again at Slamboree 2000, this was also the final WCW pay per view before the arrival of Hulk Hogan.

This was Barry Windham's final WCW appearance until 1998, after this event, he originally was supposed to return to the World Wrestling Federation and join Ted DiBiase's Million Dollar Corporation alongside his brother in-law Mike Rotunda (as Irwin R. Schyster) as "The New Money Inc." but suffered a knee injury during his match with Ric Flair at this event which prevented him from going back to the WWF.

== Results ==
No.	Results	Stipulations	Times
1^{D}	Pretty Wonderful (Paul Orndorff and Paul Roma) defeated the Armstrongs (Brad Armstrong and Brian Armstrong)	Tag team match	10:02
2	Steve Austin (c) defeated Johnny B. Badd	Singles match for the WCW United States Heavyweight Championship	16:12
3	Terry Funk vs. Tully Blanchard ended in a double disqualification	Singles match	07:15
4	Larry Zbyszko defeated Lord Steven Regal	Singles match	11:30
5	Dustin Rhodes defeated Bunkhouse Buck (with Col. Robert Parker)	Bullrope match	12:47
6	Ric Flair (c) defeated Barry Windham	Singles match for the WCW World Heavyweight Championship	13:21
7	Cactus Jack and Kevin Sullivan defeated the Nasty Boys (Brian Knobbs and Jerry Sags) (c)	Broad Street Bully match for the WCW World Tag Team Championship with Dave Schultz as special guest referee	09:56
8	Sting defeated Big Van Vader	Singles match for the vacant WCW International World Heavyweight Championship	13:54
(c) / – the champion(s) heading into the match; D / – this was a dark match
