= Slamboree '93: A Legends' Reunion =

1993 World Championship Wrestling pay-per-view event

Slamboree (1993)
- Promotional poster featuring various WCW wrestlers
- Promotion: World Championship Wrestling
- Date: May 23, 1993
- City: Atlanta, Georgia
- Venue: The Omni
- Attendance: 7,008
- Buy rate: 100,000
- Tagline: One Moment. One Ring. One Mega-Event

Pay-per-view chronology
← Previous; SuperBrawl III	Next → Beach Blast

Slamboree chronology
← Previous; First	Next → 1994

Slamboree '93: A Legends' Reunion was the inaugural Slamboree professional wrestling pay-per-view (PPV) event produced by World Championship Wrestling (WCW). It took place on May 23, 1993, at The Omni in Atlanta, Georgia.

== Storylines ==
The event featured wrestlers from pre-existing scripted feuds and storylines. Wrestlers portrayed villains, heroes, or less distinguishable characters in the scripted events that built tension and culminated in a wrestling match or series of matches.

== Aftermath ==
This was the final appearance of the NWA World Tag Team Championship on a WCW Pay Per View. The titles were won by Arn Anderson and Paul Roma in August 1993 at Clash of Champions XXIV, then WCW withdrew from the NWA in September 1993, and the titles would no longer be defended together; the NWA did not fill the vacancy for nearly two years; finally having a tournament in July 1995 which was won by the Rock 'n' Roll Express.

== Event ==
Other on-screen personnel
Role:	Name:
Commentator	Tony Schiavone
Commentator	Larry Zbyszko
Commentator	Johnny Valentine (For the Dory Funk, Jr/Nick Bockwinkel Match)
Interviewer	Eric Bischoff
Interviewer	Missy Hyatt
Ring announcer	Gary Michael Cappetta
Referees	Randy Anderson
Referees	Nick Patrick
Referees	Mike Adkins
Hall of Fame Host	Gordon Solie

At the event, Lou Thesz, Mr. Wrestling II, Verne Gagne, and Eddie Graham were inducted into the WCW Hall of Fame. Additionally, Ole Anderson, The Assassin, Ox Baker, Red Bastien, Lord James Blears, The Crusher, The Fabulous Moolah, Greg Gagne, Bob Geigel, Stu Hart, Magnum T. A., Bugsy McGraw, Don Owen, Dusty Rhodes, Grizzly Smith, John Tolos, Mad Dog Vachon and Johnny Valentine were also honoured during a "Legends Ceremony".

The event also saw the reformation of the Four Horsemen, now consisting of Ric Flair, Arn Anderson, Ole Anderson, and new member Paul Roma.

It also saw Sid Vicious return to WCW, following a stint in the World Wrestling Federation.

The card underwent several changes, as Brad Armstrong replaced his father Bob Armstrong in the Legends Tag Team Match and The Prisoner replaced Scott Norton in the Bounty Match with Sting. In the WCW/NWA World Tag Team Championship steel cage match, Tom Zenk replaced Shane Douglas as Ricky Steamboat's partner in the masked Dos Hombres team. However, the announcers pretended throughout the match that Steamboat's partner was Douglas.

== Home media and streaming ==
The event was released on home video in the United States. Unlike other WCW pay-per-view events from 1993, it was not released in the United Kingdom by Turner Home Entertainment.

In 2014, the event was included on the WWE's streaming platform the WWE Network as part of its launch and remained on the service until the platform closed in 2026.

As of October 2026, the event is no longer available to stream and has not been added to any of the streaming platforms that the WWE has agreements with.

== Results ==
No.	Results	Stipulations	Times
1	2 Cold Scorpio and Marcus Bagwell defeated Bobby Eaton and Chris Benoit	Tag team match	09:22
2	Sid Vicious (with Robert Parker) defeated Van Hammer	Singles match	00:35
3	Dick Murdoch, Don Muraco and Jimmy Snuka vs. Wahoo McDaniel, Blackjack Mulligan and Jim Brunzell ended in a no-contest	Six-man tag team match	09:06
4	Thunderbolt Patterson and Brad Armstrong defeated Ivan Koloff and Baron von Raschke	Tag team match	04:39
5	Dory Funk Jr. (with Gene Kiniski) vs. Nick Bockwinkel (with Verne Gagne) ended in a time-limit draw	Singles match	15:00
6	Rick Rude and Paul Orndorff defeated Dustin Rhodes and Kensuke Sasaki	Tag team match	09:25
7	Sting defeated The Prisoner	Singles match	05:16
8	The Hollywood Blonds (Brian Pillman and Steve Austin) (c) defeated Dos Hombres (Ricky Steamboat and Tom Zenk)	Steel Cage match for the NWA and WCW World Tag Team Championships	16:08
9	Barry Windham (c) defeated Arn Anderson	Singles match for the NWA World Heavyweight Championship	10:55
10	Davey Boy Smith defeated Big Van Vader (c) by disqualification	Singles match for the WCW World Heavyweight Championship	16:16
(c) / – the champion(s) heading into the match
