= WCW Hall of Fame =

Professional wrestling hall of fame

The World Championship Wrestling (WCW) Hall of Fame was an American professional wrestling hall of fame maintained by World Championship Wrestling (WCW). It was established in 1993 to honor wrestlers who began their careers long before the 1990s, mostly alumni of the National Wrestling Alliance (NWA)'s Jim Crockett Promotions (JCP) territory, the predecessor of WCW. Inductees received commemorative plaques that had their names and portraits inscribed on them. Wrestlers were inducted by Gordon Solie, a senior commentator in professional wrestling, and received their plaque during the "Legends Reunion" segment at WCW's May pay-per-view event, Slamboree. The WCW Hall of Fame was the second major hall of fame established to honor professional wrestlers, after the creation of the World Wrestling Federation (WWF)'s Hall of Fame in February 1993. After the 1995 Hall of Fame ceremony, WCW stopped the production of the Hall of Fame ceremonies without a formal announcement. In 2001, the WWF acquired all of its assets; this led to the formal stoppage of the WCW Hall of Fame. The WWF, however, had stopped producing its Hall of Fame ceremonies after 1996. In 2004, World Wrestling Entertainment (WWE), the WWF's successor, reinstated the WWE Hall of Fame, which included inductees that were alumni of WWF/WWE, NWA, JCP, and WCW.^{[a]}

The first Hall of Fame ceremony was held on May 23, 1993, at Slamboree '93: A Legends' Reunion at The Omni in Atlanta, Georgia. The first wrestler inducted into the Hall of Fame was Lou Thesz, along with Verne Gagne and Mr. Wrestling II. Eddie Graham was also inducted that year; he was the first posthumous inductee into the Hall of Fame.

During the following Hall of Fame ceremony on May 22, 1994, at Slamboree '94: A Legends' Reunion at Civic Center in Philadelphia, Pennsylvania, Harley Race led the Class of 1994. Ole Anderson, The Crusher, posthumous inductee Dick the Bruiser, Ernie Ladd, and Masked Assassin were also inducted that year.

The final ceremony was held at Slamboree '95: A Legends' Reunion on May 25, 1995, in St. Petersburg, Florida at Bayfront Arena, in which Wahoo McDaniel led the Class of 1995. Also inducted that year were posthumous inductee Big John Studd, Terry Funk, Antonio Inoki, Angelo Poffo, Dusty Rhodes, and Gordon Solie. Following the 1995 ceremony, Solie, who both inducted the wrestlers and was an influential figure in the selections, resigned from WCW in protest of Poffo's initiation, feeling that management only inducted an unqualified person into the WCW Hall of Fame as a favor to Poffo's son, and one of the company's top draws, Randy Savage. 1995's ceremony had speeches from the inductions, where as the other two just had plaques being presented to them. The Crusher, Dick the Bruiser, Inoki, Rhodes, Gagne, Race, and Thesz were the only former World Heavyweight Champions to have been inducted. A posthumous inductee was inducted at every ceremony. Solie was the only non-wrestler to have been inducted into the Hall of Fame. Overall, there were 17 inductees. On February 26, 2024, Ole Anderson, the last remaining living member of the WCW Hall of Fame, died.

== Inductees ==
| No. | Image | Year | Ring name (Birth name)^{[b]} | Notes^{[c]}^{[d]} |
|---|---|---|---|---|
| 1 | | 1993 | Lou Thesz (Aloysius Thesz) | Won the NWA World Heavyweight Championship (3 times), NWA International Heavyweight Championship (1 time), and NWA Southern Junior Heavyweight Championship (1 time) |
| 2 | | 1993 | Verne Gagne (Laverne Gagne) | Won the AWA World Heavyweight Championship (10 times) and Omaha World Heavyweight Championship (4 times) |
| 3 | | 1993 | Mr. Wrestling II (John Walker) | Won the NWA Georgia Heavyweight Championship (10 times), NWA Mid-America Southern Tag Team Championship (9 times), and NWA Florida Heavyweight Championship (2 times) |
| 4 | | 1993 | Eddie Graham (Edward Gossett) | Posthumous inductee: Won the NWA Florida World Tag Team Championship (7 times) and NWA United States Tag Team Championship (4 times) |
| 5 | | 1994 | Harley Race | Won the NWA World Heavyweight Championship (8 times), First ever NWA (Mid-Atlantic) United States Champion (which later became the WCW, then WWE U.S. Title) |
| 6 | | 1994 | Ernie Ladd (Ernest Ladd) | Won the NWA Americas Heavyweight Championship (3 times) and NWA Tri-State North American Heavyweight Championship (4 times) |
| 7 | | 1994 | The Crusher (Reginald Lisowski) | Won the AWA World Heavyweight Championship (3 times) and AWA World Tag Team Championship (9 times) |
| 8 | | 1994 | Dick the Bruiser (William Afflis) | Posthumous inductee: Won the WWA World Heavyweight Championship (11 times), WWA World Tag Team Championship (14 times), AWA World Heavyweight Championship (1 time), and NWA Detroit United States Championship (4 times) |
| 9 | | 1994 | Ole Anderson (Alan Rogowski) | Won the AWA Midwest Heavyweight Championship (1 time), NWA Georgia Tag Team Championship (17 times), and the WCW World Tag Team Championship (8 times) |
| 10 | | 1994 | Masked Assassin (Joseph Hamilton) | Won the NWA Central States Heavyweight Championship (1 time), NWA Florida Southern Heavyweight Championship (1 time), and NWA Georgia Tag Team Championship (14 times) |
| 11 | | 1995 | Wahoo McDaniel (Edward McDaniel) | Won the NWA Florida Heavyweight Championship (1 time), NWA Mid-Atlantic Heavyweight Championship (5 times), NWA United States Championship (5 times), WCW World Tag Team Championship (4 times) |
| 12 | | 1995 | Dusty Rhodes (Virgil Runnels, Jr.) | Won the NWA World Heavyweight Championship (3 times), NWA (Mid-Atlantic) U.S. Championship (1 time), WCW World Tag Team Championship (2 times), and NWA World TV Championship (1 time) |
| 13 | | 1995 | Antonio Inoki (Kanji Inoki) | Won the WWF World Martial Arts Heavyweight Championship (2 times) and the NWA International (4 times) and North American (2 times) Tag Team Championships |
| 14 | | 1995 | Angelo Poffo | Won the NWA Detroit United States Heavyweight Championship (1 time) and WWA World Tag Team Championship (3 times) |
| 15 | | 1995 | Terry Funk (Terrence Funk) | Won the NWA World Heavyweight Championship (1 time), and NWA/WCW United States Championship (2 times) |
| 16 | | 1995 | Big John Studd (John Minton) | Posthumous inductee: Won the WWWF World Tag Team Championship (1 time) and NWA Mid-Atlantic Tag Team Championship (4 times) |
| 17 | | 1995 | Gordon Solie (Francis Labiak) | The only non-wrestler inductee and play-by-play commentator for WCW |

== Notes ==
- ^{a} – From 1996 to 2001, WCW did not induct any person into the Hall of Fame.
- ^{b} – Entries without a birth name indicates that the inductee did not perform under a ring name.
- ^{c} – Before the 1990s, Jim Crockett Promotions (JCP) consisted of numerous smaller territories acquired during its national expansion while also maintaining working relationships with the American Wrestling Association (AWA) and the World Wrestling Association (WWA), while the National Wrestling Alliance (NWA) was a governing body that sanctioned numerous member promotions while additionally distributing many titles amongst its members including the World Wide Wrestling Federation (WWWF, later WWF), Championship Wrestling From Florida, Eastern Championship Wrestling, among others.
- ^{d} – This section mainly lists the major accomplishments of each inductee in the NWA, JCP, and WCW.
