= Omni =

Omni is a Latin prefix meaning "all" or "every". Omni may also refer to:

== Mormonism ==
- Omni (Book of Mormon prophet), a man in the Book of Mormon
- Book of Omni, one of the books in the Book of Mormon

== Vehicles ==
- Dodge Omni, a vehicle manufactured by Chrysler from 1978 to 1990
- Maruti Omni, a vehicle manufactured by Maruti Udyog in India

== Arts and entertainment ==
=== Music ===
- Omni (band), an American post-punk band from Atlanta
- Ømni, an album by Angra
- Omni (Minus the Bear album), a 2010 album
- Omni (The Browning album), a 2024 album
- "Omni", a song by Scale the Summit from the album Monument
- Omni Trio, stage name of British drum and bass music artist Rob Haigh

=== Fictional characters ===
- Omni, a fictional time travel device used in the 1980s TV series Voyagers!
- Omni, a fictional villain in the television series Power Rangers: S.P.D.
- Omni-Man, a superhero character from the Invincible series

== Organizations and businesses ==
- Omni (company), a San Francisco-based storage and rental company
- Omni (magazine), a science and science fiction magazine published from 1978 to 1995
- Omni (website), a Swedish news aggregator service
- Omni Air International, an American charter airline
- Omni - Aviacao e Tecnologia, a Portuguese charter airline
- Omni Bank (California), Chinese bank with branches in the U.S.
- Omni Coliseum, a large indoor arena located in Atlanta, Georgia, demolished in 1997
- The Omni Group, a software developer
- Omni Hotels & Resorts, a North American hotel chain
- Omni International Mall, in downtown Miami, Florida, closed in 2000
- Omni Superstore, former discount grocery store chain owned by Dominick's in the Chicago, Illinois market area
- Omni Television, a Canadian TV channel

== Other uses ==
- OMNI (SCIP), a device for secure voice and data communications over telephone lines
- Omni wheel, a design for a wheel
- Virtuix Omni, an omnidirectional treadmill for use with virtual reality gaming headsets like the Oculus Rift
- OMNI Entertainment System, a quiz based game system by MB Electronics
- Omnichannel retail strategy, a business model integrating offline and online presences

== See also ==
- Omnia (disambiguation)
- Omnis (disambiguation)
- Omnitel (disambiguation)
- Omniverse (disambiguation)
- OMNY, a fare payment system in New York City
- omnisexual, a sexualty where attracted to all genders with gender having a factor in attraction
