= Omnia =

Omnia may refer to:

== People ==
- Omnia (DJ) (born 1987), Ukrainian trance/progressive house DJ and producer
- Omnia Fakhry (born 1982), Egyptian modern pentathlete Olympian
- Omnia Mahmoud (born 1994), Egyptian soccer player
- Omnia Shawkat (born 1987), Sudanese journalist

== Places and fictional locations ==
- Omnia Township, Cowley County, Kansas, USA
- Omnia, a fictional nation in the Discworld universe
- Omnia (nightclub), a nightclub located at Caesar's Palace in Las Vegas

== Groups and fictional organizations ==
- Omnia (band), a pagan folk band from the Netherlands
- Omnia Audio, an audio processor manufacturer
- Musica Omnia, a U.S. classical music record label

== Arts, entertainment, media ==
- omnia, or complete works
- Omnia Media, a multichannel network from Blue Ant
- Omnia, an alumni publication for The Caterham School Society in England
- Omnia Magazine, a publication by the University of Pennsylvania School of Arts & Sciences
- Phantom Breaker: Omnia, a 2020 videogame

== Other uses ==
- Samsung Omnia, a group of smartphones by Samsung
- Turris Omnia, a network router

== See also ==
- Omni (disambiguation)
- Omnis (disambiguation)
