= Slamboree =

Professional wrestling pay-per-view event

- WCW Slamboree logo used since 1993
- Promotions: World Championship Wrestling
- First event: Slamboree (1993)
- Last event: Slamboree (2000)

Slamboree was a professional wrestling pay-per-view (PPV) event from World Championship Wrestling (WCW) held from 1993 through 2000. It was originally billed as "A Legends' Reunion" because many retired legends from Jim Crockett Promotions attended the PPV and other events scheduled for that weekend. The first three Slamborees included inductions into the WCW Hall of Fame and also included matches with the legends participating.

Since 2014, all Slamboree events are available on the WWE Network. WWE acquired the "Slamboree" trademark upon the sale of WCW's intellectual properties in 2001 which it allowed the trademark to expire in 2005. In November 2019, Cody Rhodes filed to claim the Slamboree trademark. In November 2020, a settlement was reached between Cody Rhodes and WWE in which Cody gained the "Cody Rhodes" trademark, which WWE had held onto after his run in that company, in exchange for WWE gaining the WCW event name trademarks that Cody had claimed, including Slamboree.

== Dates, venues and main events ==
WCW/nWo co-branded event

#	Event	Date	City	Venue	Main event
1	Slamboree (1993)	May 23, 1993	Atlanta, Georgia	The Omni	Big Van Vader (c) vs. Davey Boy Smith for the WCW World Heavyweight Championship
2	Slamboree (1994)	May 22, 1994	Philadelphia, Pennsylvania	Philadelphia Civic Center	Sting vs. Vader for the vacant WCW International World Heavyweight Championship
3	Slamboree (1995)	May 21, 1995	St. Petersburg, Florida	Bayfront Arena	Hulk Hogan and Randy Savage vs. Ric Flair and Vader
4	Slamboree (1996)	May 19, 1996	Baton Rouge, Louisiana	Riverside Centroplex	The Giant (c) vs. Sting for the WCW World Heavyweight Championship
5	Slamboree (1997)	May 18, 1997	Charlotte, North Carolina	Independence Arena	Ric Flair, Roddy Piper and Kevin Greene vs. nWo (Scott Hall, Kevin Nash and Syxx)
6	Slamboree (1998)	May 17, 1998	Worcester, Massachusetts	The Centrum	The Outsiders (Scott Hall and Kevin Nash) (c) vs. Sting and The Giant for the WCW World Tag Team Championship
7	Slamboree (1999)	May 9, 1999	St. Louis, Missouri	TWA Dome	Diamond Dallas Page (c) vs. Kevin Nash for the WCW World Heavyweight Championship
8	Slamboree (2000)	May 7, 2000	Kansas City, Missouri	Kemper Arena	David Arquette (c) vs. Jeff Jarrett vs. Diamond Dallas Page in a Ready to Rumble Cage match for the WCW World Heavyweight Championship
(c) – refers to the champion(s) heading into the match
