= Omnis (disambiguation) =

Omnis may refer to:

- Omnis Studio, a rapid application development tool
- OMNIS, a Malagasy governmental organization
- Omnis, Inc., an American company
- "Omnis", a song by Phinehas from the album Till the End

== See also ==
- Omni (disambiguation)
- Omnia (disambiguation)
