= Reem Gaafar =

Sudanese writer and public health physician (born 1983)

- ريم جعفر
- Born: 1983 (age 42–43); Sudan
- Education: University of Juba, University of Liverpool
- Occupations: writer and public health physician
- Writing career
- Years active: 2008–present
- Notable work: A Mouthful of Salt
- Notable awards: Island Prize

Reem Gaafar (Arabic: ريم جعفر, born 1983) is a Sudanese writer, researcher and public health physician. Her fiction and non-fiction writing has been published in magazines and health-related publications. In 2023, she received the Island Prize for a Debut Novel from Africa for the manuscript of her forthcoming novel A Mouth Full of Salt.

== Life and career ==
Gaafar grew up between New Zealand and Oman. In 2007, she obtained a Bachelor degree in Medicine and Surgery from the University of Juba in what was then southern Sudan. After having first served as a clinical practitioner, she turned towards public health in 2012 and served as community medicine resident at the Sudan Medical Specialization Board. In 2014, she obtained a Master of Public Health from the University of Liverpool, UK.

As a researcher and public health physician, Gaafar has been affiliated to the Mohammed bin Rashid School of Government, Dubai, United Arab Emirates and since 2022 as Graduate Research assistant at the Faculty of Health Sciences of Ontario Tech University in Canada. As consultant, she has worked for organizations including the WHO country office in Khartoum, the Transitional Government and Federal Ministry of Health in Sudan, the London School of Hygiene & Tropical Medicine, as well as for health communication campaigns in the MENA region. Among others, she has published studies related to COVID-19, mental health policy and health risks of children in Sudan and the UAE. In a 2014 article published by Al Jazeera, she was quoted with her very critical experience of the public health sector in Sudan.

In 2020, Gaafar was shortlisted for the Miles Moreland Foundation Writing Scholarship. In 2023, she won the Island Prize for a debut novel from Africa for the manuscript of her novel A Mouth Full of Salt. The title of the book refers to a Sudanese proverb that evokes the "taste left in one’s mouth after a great loss." She is the first novelist from Sudan to be distinguished by this award. The publisher Holland House Books gave a short description of this story, published in 2024 by Saqi Books:

During the search for a drowned boy in the North of Sudan, a strange woman appears and with her a series of strange and tragic events. Animals die of a mysterious illness; the date tree field catches fire and burns to the ground; a young girl dies. The women in this story are trapped in a gender and racial hierarchy, with ingrained bigotry blaming all change in society on evil outside forces.

— Holland House Books, A Mouth Full of Salt, Reem Gaafar

== Advocacy for women's contribution to society ==
Gaafar also has advocated for women’s rights, women's health and civil society at large. In their 2019 article entitled Sudanese Women at the Heart of the Revolution, Gaafar and Sudanese journalist Omnia Shawkat explained the reasons, actions and vital role of Sudanese women before and during the 2018/19 Sudanese revolution. An important aspect in their analysis is the role that social media platforms have provided for the revolutionary mobilisation, where traditional media have failed. Her fiction and non-fiction writing has been published in magazines including African Arguments, African Feminism, Teakisi Magazine, Andariya, 500 Words Magazine, International Health Policies and Health Systems Global.

== Selected publications ==
- A Mouth Full of Salt. 2024. London: Saqi Books, ISBN 978-0-86356-772-8.

Short stories

- Light of the Desert. Magid, Djamela, et al. (eds). 2014. I Know Two Sudans: An Anthology of Creative Writing from Sudan and South Sudan. ISBN 978-0993110801
- Finding Descartes. Nana Ekua Brew-Hammond (ed.). 2023. Relations: An Anthology of African and Diaspora Voices. New York: Harpervia, an imprint of HarperCollinsPublishers. ISBN 978-0-06-308904-4

Essays and journalistic articles

- The Never Ending Search For Home. 2016.
- 30 Sudanese Women You Should Know. 2016.
- Briefcase: Bridging Musical Generational Gaps. 2017.
- FGM, Women Driving, And The Stockholm Syndrome Of Oppressive Societies. 2017.
- Sudan Revolts. 2018.
- Sudanese Women at the Heart of the Revolution. 2019.
- Covid-19 Response in Sudan: The Pandemic vs. the Politics. 2022.

== See also ==
- Sudanese literature
- List of Sudanese writers
