= Slamboree (1998) =

1998 World Championship Wrestling pay-per-view event

- Promotional poster featuring Hugh Morrus
- Promotion: World Championship Wrestling
- Brand(s): WCW nWo
- Date: May 17, 1998
- City: Worcester, Massachusetts
- Venue: The Centrum
- Attendance: 11,592
- Buy rate: 275,000
- Tagline: The Strong Survive. The Ruthless Win.

Pay-per-view chronology
← Previous; Spring Stampede	Next → The Great American Bash

Slamboree chronology
← Previous; 1997	Next → 1999

The 1998 Slamboree was the sixth Slamboree professional wrestling pay-per-view (PPV) event produced by World Championship Wrestling (WCW). It took place on May 17, 1998 from The Centrum in Worcester, Massachusetts and featured a double main event.

Nine matches were contested at the event. In the main event, Sting and The Giant defeated The Outsiders (Scott Hall and Kevin Nash) to win the WCW World Tag Team Championship. In other prominent matches, Bret Hart defeated Randy Savage, Diamond Dallas Page defeated Raven in a Bowery Death match, and Dean Malenko defeated Chris Jericho to win the WCW Cruiserweight Championship, after winning a battle royal (under the name Ciclope) to earn the opportunity.

== Storylines ==
The event featured professional wrestling matches that involve different wrestlers from pre-existing scripted feuds and storylines. Professional wrestlers portray villains, heroes, or less distinguishable characters in the scripted events that build tension and culminate in a wrestling match or series of matches.

The major storyline in the buildup to Slamboree was the acrimonious split of the New World Order into separate factions. Kevin Nash led one faction known as the Wolfpac, which adopted a black and red color scheme as its identifying mark. The other faction consisted of members that stayed loyal to nWo leader Hollywood Hogan, retaining the original group’s black and white color scheme and becoming known as nWo Hollywood. The fracturing of the group, and several developments that followed, played a significant role in the events that led to the two main feature bouts on the card.

Randy Savage, who had been feuding with Hogan for some time prior, defeated Sting with help from Nash to win the WCW World Heavyweight Championship at Spring Stampede in April 1998. Hogan was furious over the development and challenged Savage to a title match the next night on WCW Monday Nitro. During the match, Bret Hart interfered on Hogan’s behalf and assisted him in defeating Savage to win the match and world championship. A match was eventually signed for Slamboree after several brawls between the two wrestlers.

Meanwhile, The Outsiders had been the reigning tag team champions since SuperBrawl VIII, defeating the Steiner Brothers when Scott Steiner turned on his brother Rick. Shortly after his loss to Sting at Uncensored in March, Scott Hall disappeared from WCW to attend rehab. His return was scheduled for Slamboree, where he and Nash would defend their titles against Sting and The Giant. Shortly before Slamboree, however, Hogan and Nash had a confrontation wherein Giant, who had previously been a member of the nWo in 1996, came to the ring a black and white nWo shirt and assaulted Nash, revealing himself as the newest member of Hogan’s nWo faction. Sting was left as the sole WCW representative in the match, while Hall had not confirmed his allegiance to either side in the schism between nWo factions.

Other on-screen personnel
Role:	Name:
Commentators	Tony Schiavone
Commentators	Bobby Heenan
Commentators	Mike Tenay
Interviewer	Gene Okerlund
Ring announcers	Michael Buffer
Ring announcers	David Penzer
Referees	Mickie Henson
Referees	Charles Robinson
Referees	Nick Patrick
Referees	Billy Silverman

The winner of the Cruiserweight battle royal received an immediate WCW Cruiserweight Championship opportunity against champion Chris Jericho. Ciclope and Juventud Guerrera were the last two competitors in the match; the two wrestlers shook hands and Guerrera climbed out over the top rope to give "Ciclope" the victory. Ciclope then unmasked, revealing himself as Dean Malenko. Malenko would later be stripped of the WCW World Cruiserweight Championship two weeks later on Nitro for his actions in the battle royal. After the Bowery Death match, one of Raven's riot guards started handcuffing all the members of the flock, including Raven, to the steel cage. After he handcuffed Raven, he took off his helmet to reveal himself as Mortis, and then Mortis took his mask off. This also revealed that he was the drink vendor that attacked during the Van Hammer and Saturn fight earlier in the week. Goldberg was originally supposed to wrestle a gauntlet match against each member of The Flock, where if Goldberg lost to any of the Flock members, Raven would regain the United States Championship Goldberg had taken from him. However, that stipulation was changed on the night of the show. Eric Bischoff had made a challenge on the episode of WCW Monday Nitro six days before Slamboree for Vince McMahon to show up and wrestle him. McMahon did not show up and Bischoff ordered the referee to start the match and count to ten, then was awarded the win by countout.

Originally Bret Hart forced Randy Savage to submit with the Sharpshooter, but the following night on Nitro, special guest referee Roddy Piper changed his decision and declared Savage as the winner by disqualification. In the main event, Sting and The Giant defeated The Outsiders (Scott Hall and Kevin Nash) to win the WCW World Tag Team Championship when The Giant pinned Nash after Hall hit Nash with one of the WCW World Tag Team Championship belts. After the match, Hall, Dusty Rhodes and The Giant celebrated as Hall and Rhodes then joined nWo Hollywood. When the match was signed, both Sting and Giant were representatives of WCW. However, Giant joined nWo Hollywood shortly before Slamboree. As a result of Giant's defection, Sting no longer desired to be his partner. This led to a singles match at The Great American Bash the next month with control of the titles at stake.

== Reception ==
In 2017, Kevin Pantoja of 411Mania gave the event a rating of 3.5 [Bad], stating, "Pretty much what I expected from WCW in this era. 1998 saw them start their downfall and shows like this are why. They got very little right (the Malenko angle, most of Benoit/Booker and some of the Guerreros stuff) and the rest was either bad matches, poor booking or a combination of both. Savage/Hart was a disappointment, Luger/Adams sucked massively and the main event made no sense. Recommendation to avoid."

== Results ==
No.	Results	Stipulations	Times
1	Fit Finlay (c) defeated Chris Benoit	Singles match for the WCW World Television Championship	14:53
2	Lex Luger defeated Brian Adams (with Vincent)	Singles match	05:05
3	Ciclope won by last eliminating Juventud Guerrera (Note: Other participants include: Damián 666, El Dandy, El Grillo, Juventud Guerrera, Chavo Guerrero Jr., Marty Jannetty, Evan Karagias, Billy Kidman, Lenny Lane, Psychosis, Silver King, Super Caló, Johnny Swinger, and Villano IV.)	Battle Royal to determine the #1 contender to the WCW Cruiserweight Championship	08:27
4	Dean Malenko defeated Chris Jericho (c)	Singles match for the WCW Cruiserweight Championship	07:02
5	Diamond Dallas Page defeated Raven	Bowery Death match	14:35
6	Eddie Guerrero (with Chavo Guerrero Jr.) defeated Ultimo Dragon	Singles match	11:09
7	Goldberg (c) defeated Perry Saturn	Singles match for the WCW United States Heavyweight Championship	07:01
8	Bret Hart defeated Randy Savage	Singles match with Roddy Piper as special guest referee	16:38
9	Sting and The Giant defeated The Outsiders (Scott Hall and Kevin Nash) (c) (with Dusty Rhodes)	Tag team match for the WCW World Tag Team Championship	14:46
(c) / – the champion(s) heading into the match
