= Terry Funk =

American wrestler (1944–2023)

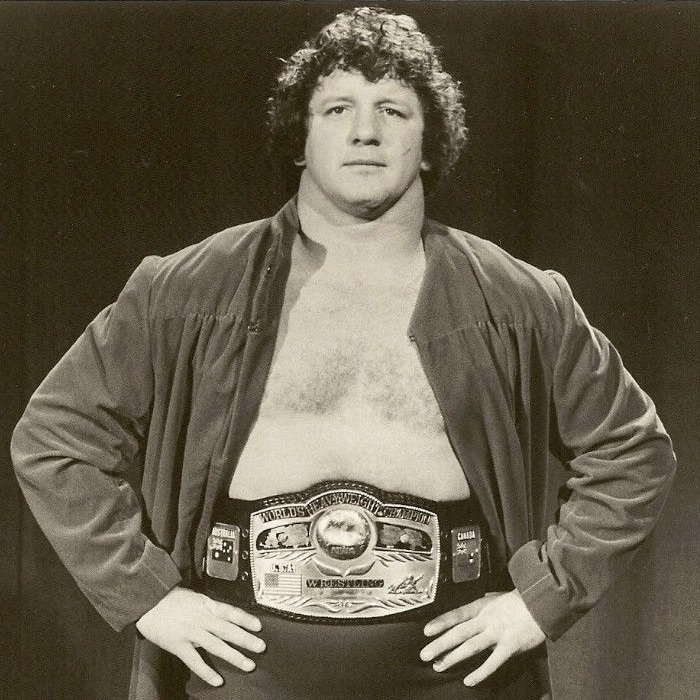
- Funk as NWA World Heavyweight Champion in 1976

Personal information
- Born: Terrance Dee Funk; June 30, 1944 Hammond, Indiana, U.S.
- Died: August 23, 2023 (aged 79) Phoenix, Arizona, U.S.
- Education: West Texas State University
- Spouse: Vicki Weaver (m. 1964; died 2019)
- Children: 2
- Family: Dory Funk (father); Dory Funk Jr. (brother)

Professional wrestling career
- Ring name(s): Black Baron; Chainsaw Charlie; Dr Knows-it-All; Terry Funk
- Billed height: 6 ft 1 in (185 cm)
- Billed weight: 247 lb (112 kg)
- Billed from: Amarillo, Texas, U.S.
- Trained by: Dory Funk
- Debut: 1965
- Retired: September 22, 2017

Terrance Dee Funk (June 30, 1944 – August 23, 2023) was an American professional wrestler and actor. Funk is known for the length of his career, which spanned more than 50 years and included multiple short-lived retirements. He is also known for his influential hardcore wrestling style he pioneered in the latter part of his career.

Over the course of his career, Funk wrestled for professional wrestling promotions including All Japan Pro Wrestling, Extreme Championship Wrestling, the International Wrestling Association of Japan, Frontier Martial-Arts Wrestling, World Championship Wrestling, the World Wrestling Federation, and multiple National Wrestling Alliance territories including Big Time Wrestling, Championship Wrestling from Florida, Georgia Championship Wrestling, and Stampede Wrestling. He was the promoter of the Amarillo, Texas-based Western States Sports promotion.

Championships held by Funk included the ECW World Heavyweight Championship, NWA World Heavyweight Championship, USWA Unified World Heavyweight Championship, and WWF World Tag Team Championship. He headlined ECW's premier annual pay-per-view event, November to Remember, three times. Funk was inducted into multiple halls of fame (including WWE, WCW, NWA, and Hardcore).

Outside of wrestling, Funk had a second career as an actor, including numerous film collaborations with Sylvester Stallone.

== Early life ==
Funk was born on June 30, 1944, in Hammond, Indiana. He was the son of Dorothy Funk (née Culver) and Dory Funk, a professional wrestler and professional wrestling promoter. Following the end of World War II, the family relocated to Amarillo, Texas, where Terry and his brother, known professionally as Dory Funk Jr., grew up in the professional wrestling business. After graduating from Canyon High School, Funk attended West Texas State University, where he competed in amateur wrestling and American football.

== Professional wrestling career ==
=== Western States Sports (1965–1979) ===
Funk started his career in 1965, working in his father Dory Funk's Western States Sports promotion in Amarillo, Texas. His debut match was against Sputnik Monroe on December 9. He and his brother, Dory Funk Jr., quickly rose up the ranks as a team and in single matches against top names like Ernie Ladd and Hank James. They became big money wrestlers by the end of the decade.

By 1980, Western States Sports's ticket sales were beginning to decline. The Funk brothers sold the territory to wrestlers Blackjack Mulligan and Dick Murdoch for $20,000 (equivalent to $78,000 in 2025).

=== Championship Wrestling from Florida (1970–1982) ===
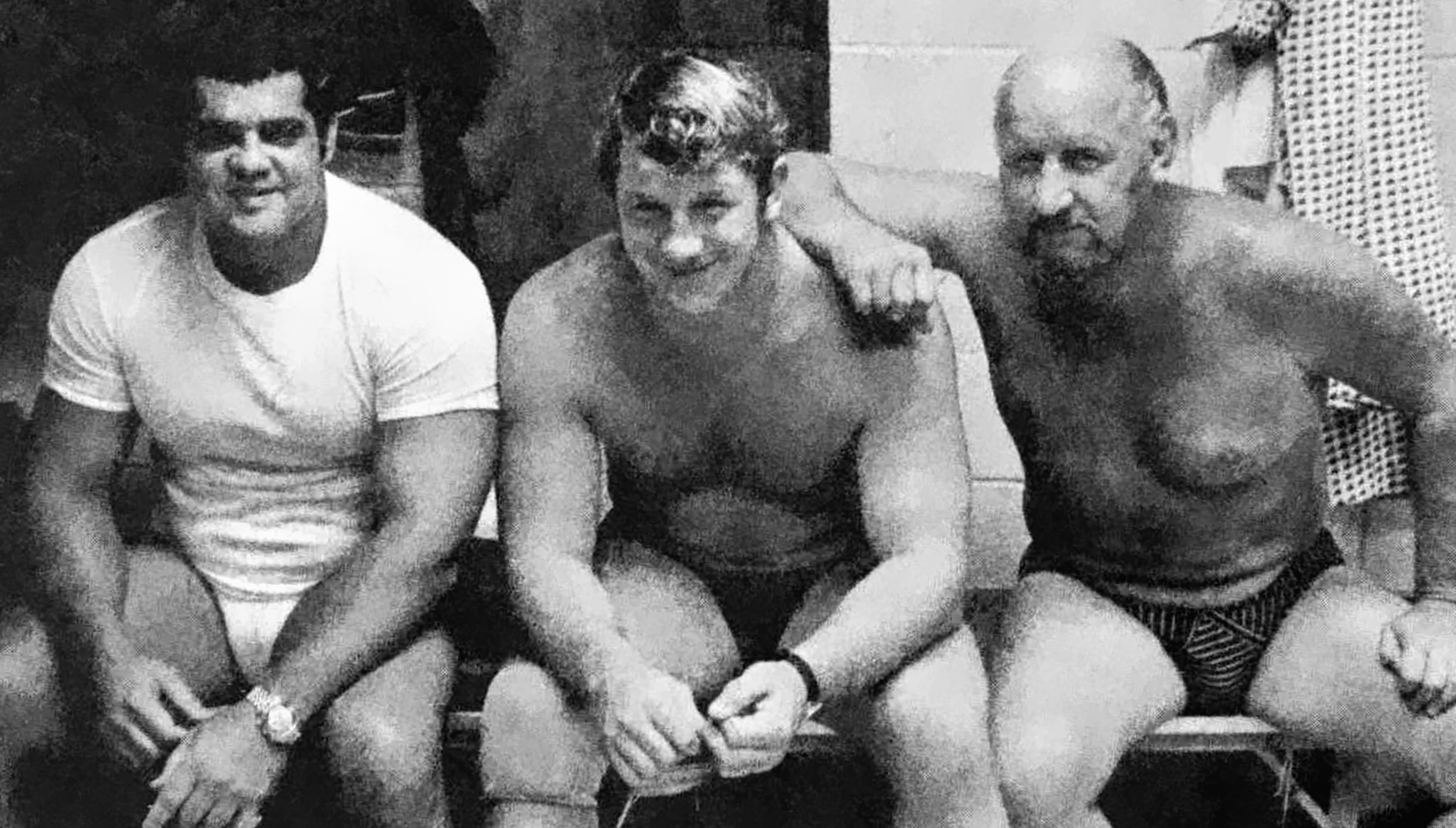
Professional wrestlers Pedro Morales (left), Terry Funk (center) and Dory Funk Sr. (right) in 1973.

In 1975, Terry defeated Jack Brisco for the NWA World Heavyweight Championship in Miami, when Dory failed to appear for a title shot. He began a 14-month title reign defending the title against Jack Brisco, Dusty Rhodes, Carlos Rocha, Giant Baba, and Pat O'Connor. In addition to North America, he defended the belt in Australia, Japan and Singapore. The historic reign ended in Toronto when he was defeated by "Handsome" Harley Race, who had earlier beaten Dory Jr. for NWA World Heavyweight Championship before losing it to Jack Brisco. Race lifted Funk for a shinbreaker and then trapped him in an Indian death leglock. When Funk failed to respond to referee Fred Atkins the match was stopped.

During 1981, Terry spent some time in the Continental Wrestling Association feuding with Jerry Lawler. The most memorable match in this feud happened in April 1981 at the Mid South Coliseum in Memphis, Tennessee. The match took place in the empty arena, with only Lance Russell, a cameraman, and a photographer present. Funk had challenged Lawler to this match at this time because he felt he was getting unfairly treated in Memphis. The confrontation only lasted a few minutes, and ended with Funk trying to put Lawler's eye out with a broken 2x4. But Lawler kicked Funk's elbow, causing him to hit himself in the eye. The tape aired on April 25, 1981.

=== Japan Wrestling Association (1970–1971) ===
In July 1970, Funk debuted in the Japan Wrestling Association (JWA) as part of its NWA World Champion Series. He primarily wrestled in the tag team division, teaming with his brother Dory. In August 1970, the Funks unsuccessfully challenged Antonio Inoki and Giant Baba for the NWA International Tag Team Championship. In November 1971, the Funks made a second tour with JWA as part of its World Champion Series. In December 1971, they defeated Inoki and Baba to win the NWA International Tag Team Championship. Later that month, Funk unsuccessfully challenged Baba for the NWA International Heavyweight Championship.

=== All Japan Pro Wrestling (1972–1987) ===
Funk debuted in All Japan Pro Wrestling (AJPW) in October 1972, the same month it was founded by Giant Baba. In his first match, he teamed with Bruno Sammartino to defeat Baba and Thunder Sugiyama in a two out of three falls match. Later that month, he unsuccessfully challenged Baba for the PWF World Heavyweight Championship. In October 1973, Funk returned to AJPW alongside his brother Dory, wrestling NWA International Tag Team Champions Baba and Tomomi Tsuruta to a time limit draw.

Funk made his next appearance with AJPW in January 1974, primarily teaming with fellow gaijins such as Jerry Brisco and Luke Graham to face Giant Baba, Jumbo Tsuruta, and The Destroyer. In August 1974, he wrestled at AJPW's Summer Action Series II, again unsuccessfully challenging Baba for the PWF Heavyweight Championship. In March 1975, the Funks took part in AJPW's NWA Membership 2nd Anniversary Excite Series, against unsuccessfully challenging NWA International Tag Team Champions Baba and Tsuruta.

In March 1976, Funk - now the NWA World Heavyweight Champion - returned to AJPW as part of its "NWA Champion Series". On June 11, 1976, Funk successfully defended his title against Jumbo Tsuruta in the Kuramae Kokugikan in Tokyo.

In December 1977, the Funks took part in the inaugural Open Tag League, a round-robin tournament amongst nine teams. They won the League with 14 points, winning six of their eight matches and wrestling to a draw in the two remaining matches. The tournament final saw them defeat Abdullah the Butcher and The Sheik by disqualification in the Kuramae Kokugikan. The Funks' performance in the tournament and the violent bout with Abdullah and the Sheik saw them turn face in AJPW.

In July 1978, Funk took part in the AJPW Summer Action Series, where he teamed with Dick Slater. Funk and Slater defeated Abdullah the Butcher and Rufus Jones to become number one contenders to the NWA International Tag Team Championship, but failed to defeat Giant Baba and Jumbo Tsuruta. In December 1978, the Funks competed in that year's World's Strongest Tag Determination League, placing second with six points.

In July 1979, the Funks wrestled in AJPW's Summer Action Series. In December 1979, they competed in that year's World's Strongest Tag Determination League, winning with 11 points. During the tournament, they once again defeated Abdullah the Butcher and The Sheik in the Kuramae Kokugikan.

In March 1980, Funk competed in the Champion Carnival, a 13-man round-robin tournament. He placed joint third with 18 points. In October and November 1980, he wrestled for AJPW as part of its Giant Series. In December 1980, the Funks competed in that year's World's Strongest Tag Determination League, placing second with eight points.

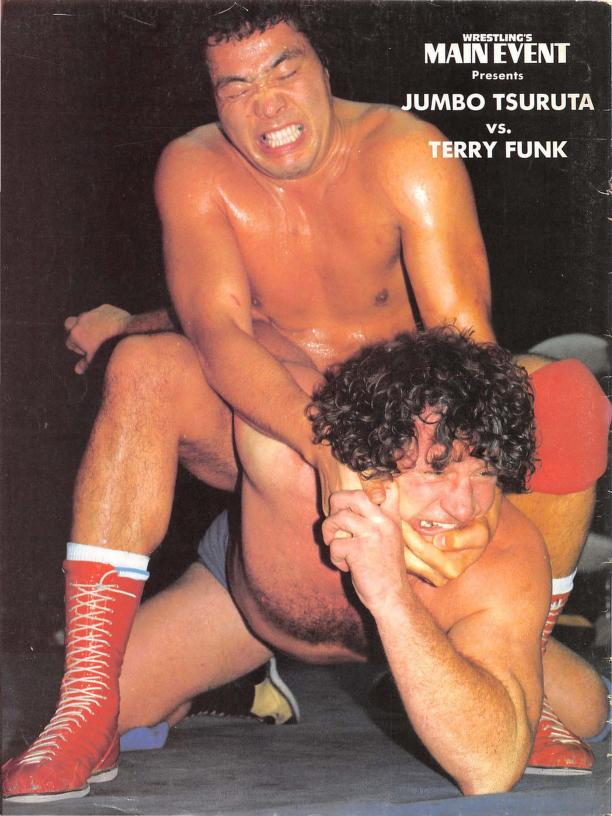
Funk (bottom) wrestling Jumbo Tsuruta in 1983

In April 1981, Funk wrestled on AJPW's International Champion Series, taking part in a tournament for the NWA International Heavyweight Championship. He defeated Killer Brooks in the first round, but lost to Giant Baba in the second round by count-out. His brother Dory went on to win the title. On April 30, Terry unsuccessfully challenged Dory in his first title defence. In October 1981, the Funks wrestled on that year's Giant Series. In November and December 1981, the Funks competed in that year's World's Strongest Tag Determination League, placing joint second with 11 points.

In April 1982, the Funks wrestled in the Grand Champion Series. In August and September, Funk wrestled in the Super Power Series. In November and December 1982, the Funks competed in that year's World's Strongest Tag Determination League, winning with nine points; the final match saw them defeat Bruiser Brody and Stan Hansen in the Kuramae Kokugikan.

In March and April 1983, the Funks took part in the Grand Champion Carnival I. On August 31, 1983, the Funks defeated Stan Hansen and Terry Gordy in the Kuramae Kokugikan. Following the match, Funk announced his retirement from professional wrestling (the first of many), giving an impassioned speech in which he declared "Japan number one! Forever and ever!", then repeated the word "Forever!" until being drowned out by the cheers of the audience.

After Funk broke his retirement in October 1984 by wrestling for NWA St. Louis, he returned to AJPW the following month, competing in that year's World's Strongest Tag Determination League alongside Dory. They placed joint second with 10 points, losing to Genichiro Tenryu and Jumbo Tsuruta.

In August 1985, Funk took part in AJPW's Decisive Battle! Dynamite Wars tour alongside Dory. In October 1985, the Funks took part in the World Champion Carnival, facing teams such as the Road Warriors.

In October 1986, the Funks wrestled for AJPW as part of its Giant Series; during the tour, Funk unsuccessfully challenged PWF World Heavyweight Champion Riki Choshu in the Ryogoku Kokugikan. In November and December 1986, they competed in that year's World's Strongest Tag Determination League, finishing joint second with nine points.

In November and December 1987, the Funks once again competed in the World's Strongest Tag Determination League, finishing second with 14 points.

=== World Wrestling Federation (1985–1986) ===
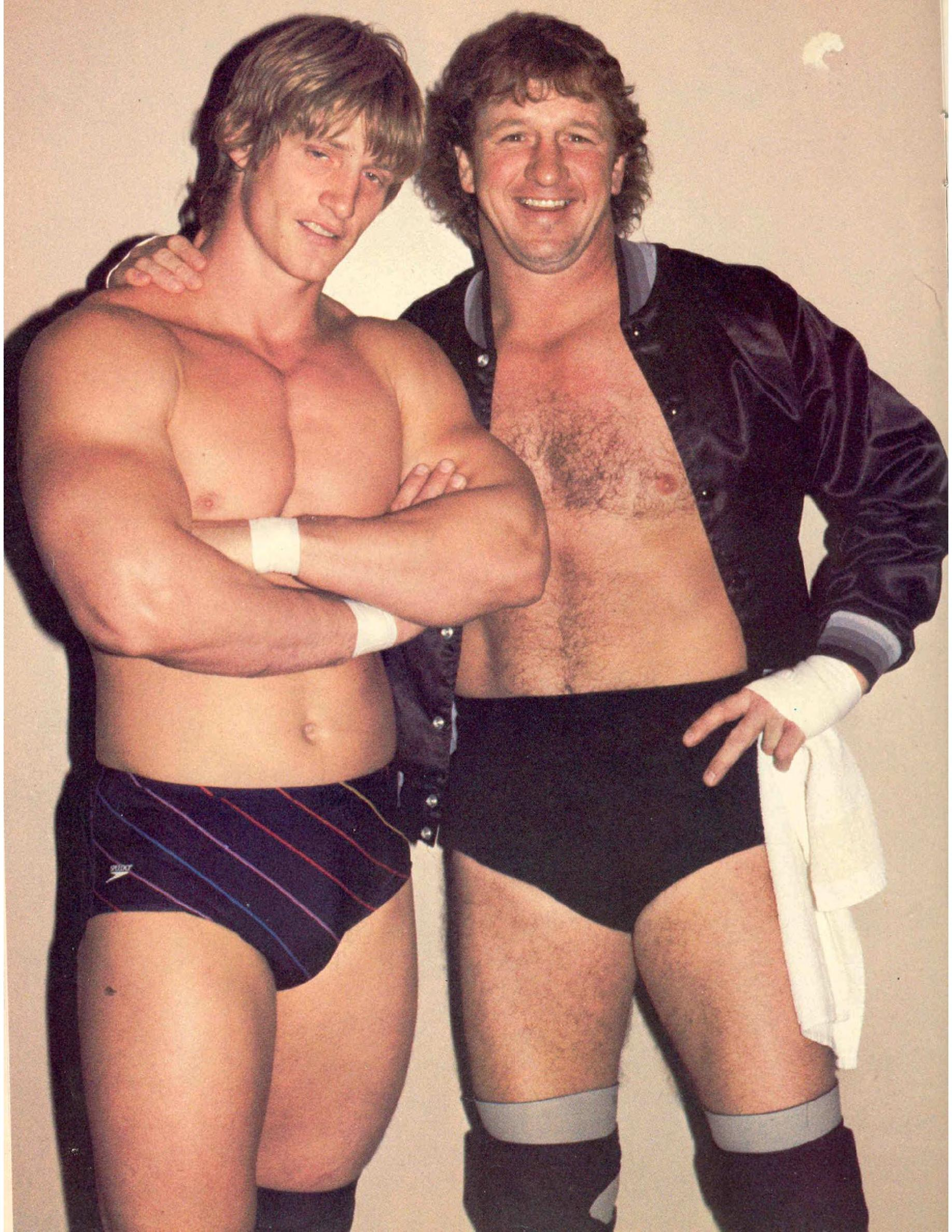
Funk (right) alongside fellow Texan wrestler Kevin Von Erich in 1985

Having wrestled a handful of matches for the New York-based World Wide Wrestling Federation (WWWF) in the early-1970s, Funk made his return to the since-renamed World Wrestling Federation (WWF) - by now in the midst of a nationwide expansion - in June 1985. Dubbed "Terrible" Terry Funk and managed by Jimmy Hart, he adopted the gimmick of a rugged cowboy, chewing tobacco and carrying a branding iron to ringside with which he "branded" his fallen opponents. In his televised debut on WWF Championship Wrestling, Funk defeated Aldo Marino, then attacked ring announcer Mel Phillips after Phillips made the mistake of putting on Funk's cowboy hat. The attack on Phillips led to a feud with Junkyard Dog.

In July 1985, Funk competed in the first King of the Ring tournament, losing to Tito Santana by disqualifaction in the first round. In October 1985, he defeated Junkyard Dog at Saturday Night's Main Event III in the Hersheypark Arena by using Hart's megaphone as a weapon. In November 1985, Funk took part in a 16-man tournament at The Wrestling Classic in the Rosemont Horizon, losing to Moondog Spot in the first round by count out after his attempt to trick Spot into walking out on the match backfired. Throughout late-1985 and early-1986, Funk repeatedly unsuccessfully challenged WWF Champion Hulk Hogan, including a bout in the Tampa Sun Dome that aired on Saturday Night's Main Event IV, which saw Hogan defeat Funk after Junkyard Dog foiled attempted interference by Jimmy Hart. Funk also unsuccessfully challenged Tito Santana for the WWF Intercontinental Championship on several occasions. In a 1999 interview, Funk referred to 1985 as his most lucrative year in wrestling, with him having earned over $500,000 (equivalent to $1,497,000 in 2025).

In February 1986, Funk was joined by his brother Dory (dubbed "Hoss Funk"), and the duo began teaming together as the Funk Brothers. Funk reignited his feud with Junkyard Dog, which led to a match pitting the Funk Brothers against Junkyard Dog and Tito Santana in the Los Angeles Memorial Sports Arena segment of WrestleMania 2, which the Funk Brothers won by using Hart's megaphone as a weapon. Later that month, Terry and Hoss were joined by the masked Jimmy Jack Funk, billed as their younger, more unstable brother. At Saturday Night's Main Event VI in the Providence Civic Center in May 1986, Terry and Hoss lost to Hulk Hogan and Junkyard Dog. Funk left the WWF later that month due to finding the WWF's gruelling schedule challenging, with Hoss and Jimmy Jack forming a tag team.

=== World Championship Wrestling (1989–1990) ===
In May 1989, Funk debuted in World Championship Wrestling, defeating Eddie Guerrero on an episode of World Championship Wrestling. Later that month, at WrestleWar '89: Music City Showdown, Funk was one of three judges for the main event between NWA World Heavyweight Champion Ric Flair and Ricky Steamboat. After Flair won the match, Funk challenged him to a title match. Flair refused, saying that Funk was "spending time in Hollywood" instead of focusing on wrestling. Funk then attacked Flair, piledriving him on a ringside table and putting him out of action. Funk went on to join Gary Hart's J-Tex Corporation. At Clash of the Champions VII: Guts and Glory, Funk lost to number one contender Ricky Steamboat by disqualification after hitting him with a microphone, solidifying his villainous persona.

Flair returned to action at the Great American Bash in July 1989 where he accepted Funk's challenge. Flair won the match by reversing a small package into one of his own, but shortly after was attacked by Gary Hart and The Great Muta. Sting came to aid Flair and the two brawled with Funk and Muta to close the show. At Clash of the Champions VIII: Fall Brawl '89 in September 1989, Flair and Sting defeated Muta and Dick Slater. After the match, Funk used a plastic shopping bag to suffocate Flair. At Halloween Havoc in October 1989, Funk (who entered the ring to Ennio Morricone's "Man With a Harmonica") and The Great Muta lost to Flair and Sting in a Thunderdome match. The feud then culminated in an "I Quit" match between Funk and Flair at Clash of the Champions IX: New York Knockout in November 1989, which Funk lost after yelling "Yes, I quit!" after Flair put on the figure four leglock. After losing, Funk shook Flair's hand, and was attacked by Gary Hart's stable. This match received a 5-star rating from Dave Meltzer.

Soon after he became a color commentator and the host of his own segment, Funk's Grill, on NWA Power Hour where a tuxedo-clad Funk would amiably interview the top stars of WCW, both face and heel. This did not last long and he left soon after for the USWA.

=== All Japan Pro Wrestling (1990–1991) ===
After an absence of close to three years, the Funks returned to AJPW in October 1990 as part of its October Giant Series. In November–December 1990, they competed in that year's World's Strongest Tag Determination League, finishing joint third with 17 points.

In April 1991, the Funks wrestled on AJPW's Champion Carnival tour. On April 9, 1991, the Funks defeated the Can-Am Express in Kumamoto; this marked Funk's final match for AJPW until 2001.

=== Eastern Championship Wrestling (1993–1994) ===
Funk debuted in the fledgling Eastern Championship Wrestling promotion in January 1993 at ECW Battle of the Belts, defeating Eddie Gilbert in an "I Quit" Texas Death match. At the Super Summer Sizzler Spectacular in June 1993, Gilbert defeated Funk in a Texas chain match massacre for the title of "King of Philadelphia" after the referee was revealed to be in cahoots with Gilbert. At UltraClash in September 1993, Funk and Stan Hansen defeated Abdullah the Butcher and Kevin Sullivan in a bunkhouse match by disqualification after Gilbert attacked Funk. After the match, Gilbert gave a promo announcing his departure from ECW, marking the end of their feud. At NWA Bloodfest in October 1993, Funk defeated Jimmy Snuka in a cage match to win the ECW Television Championship. His reign ended the following month at November to Remember when Road Warrior Hawk and Sabu defeated Funk and King Kong Bundy in a "winner takes all" tag team match with Funk's ECW Television Championship and Sabu's ECW Heavyweight Championship on the line after Bundy betrayed Funk by giving him an Avalanche Splash, enabling Sabu to pin him and become a double champion.

After Sabu pinned Funk at November to Remember, his manager Paul E. Dangerously insulted Funk by saying that Funk's father would have died if he had seen him. This led to a title match at Holiday Hell in December 1993, where Funk defeated Sabu in a no disqualification match to win the ECW Heavyweight Championship after Shane Douglas attacked Sabu. At The Night the Line Was Crossed in February 1994, Funk defended his title against Sabu and Douglas in a three way dance; the match ended in a time limit draw after 60 minutes. At Ultimate Jeopardy in March 1994, Funk, Road Warrior Hawk, Kevin Sullivan, and Tazmaniac faced Douglas, Mr. Hughes, and the Public Enemy in an "Ultimate Jeopardy steel cage match" in which each participant had a stipulation which would be implemented if they were defeated, with Funk's ECW Heavyweight Championship on the line. Douglas won the bout for his team by pinning Funk after tying a plastic bag over his head then giving him a piledriver, thereby winning the ECW Heavyweight Championship.

After ECW entered into a talent exchange agreement with World Championship Wrestling, in May 1994 Funk wrestled on WCW's Slamboree pay-per-view, while at the ECW event When Worlds Collide Funk teamed with WCW wrestler Arn Anderson to face Sabu and WCW wrestler Bobby Eaton. During the match, the Public Enemy attacked Funk at Dangerously's behest, hitting him in the leg with a 2×4. Towards the end of the match, Funk attempted to hit Sabu with a steel chair, but instead accidentally struck Anderson, leading an irate Anderson to take the chair and hit Funk in the leg in retaliation. Sabu then applied a single leg crab to Funk's injured leg, forcing him to submit; this marked the end of Funk's feud with Sabu and the beginning of a feud with the Public Enemy. On the May 17 episode of Hardcore TV, Funk cut a promo, in which he announced that he would recruit his brother Dory Funk Jr. to gain revenge on Public Enemy. At Hostile City Showdown in June 1994, the Funks wrestled the Public Enemy to a no contest. At Heatwave '94: the Battle for the Future the following month, the Funks lost to the Public Enemy in a barbed wire match.

At Hardcore Heaven in August 1994, Funk wrestled Cactus Jack in the main event. After the Public Enemy interfered in the match by attacking Jack, it was declared a no contest. The Public Enemy then proceeded to attack Jack until Jack and Funk recovered and fought back. During the post-match fight, Funk called for a fan to toss him a steel chair. This set off a wild scene as several fans obliged Funk. More and more fans eventually got involved, and the ring began filling with chairs. Jack and Funk abruptly left the ring while Rocco Rock and Johnny Grunge stayed down on the mat so as not to be struck by any of the steel chairs now being used as projectiles. The chaos resulted in Public Enemy being trapped under a massive pile of steel chairs, and the situation got so out of hand that Joey Styles had to leave his broadcast position and take the public address microphone in order to get the fans to stop throwing chairs. The Public Enemy's attack resulted in Funk and Jack forming an alliance and beginning a feud with Public Enemy. On the August 16 episode of Hardcore TV, a match was made between Public Enemy and the team of Funk and Jack for the ECW Tag Team Championship at NWA World Title Tournament. Funk did not appear at the event due to missing a flight (with Mikey Whipwreck substituting for him), and would not return to ECW for around six months.

=== Frontier Martial-Arts Wrestling (1993–1994, 1996–1997, 1999) ===
In May 1993, Funk debuted in the Japanese promotion Frontier Martial-Arts Wrestling (FMW). In his first match, he lost to FMW founder Atsushi Onita in a "no rope barbed wire current blast super large time bomb death match" in the Kawasaki Stadium at the FMW 4th Anniversary Show. In August 1993, he wrestled a series of matches for FMW as part of its Shingeki series, including teaming with Tarzan Goto to defeat nephew and uncle duo Sabu and The Sheik in a tag team stretcher death match, teaming with Onita to defeat Mr. Pogo and Ricky Fuji in a Texas street fight death match, and defeating boxer Leon Spinks by disqualification in a "different style fight".

Funk returned to FMW for two matches in May 1994 as part of its Haisuinojin series, defeating Sabu, then defeating The Sheik by knockout in a "no pinfall" match at the FMW 5th Anniversary Show.

In April and May 1996, Funk took part in FMW's Fighting Creation series. During this tour, he formed a stable with Super Leather, Headhunter A, and Headhunter B, "Funk Masters of Wrestling". His matches during the tour included teaming with Mr. Pogo to defeat Hayabusa and Masato Tanaka in a "no ropes barbed wire current mine explosion double hell time bomb tornado death match". At the FMW 7th Anniversary Show, Funk defeated Koji Nakagawa in Kawasaki Stadium.

In November 1999, the Funks returned to FMW for the FMW 10th Anniversary Show, defeating Naohiko Yamazaki and Yoshinori Sasaki in the Yokohama Arena.

=== World Championship Wrestling (1994) ===
In May 1994, Funk returned to WCW, joining Colonel Robert Parker's Stud Stable. At Slamboree '94: A Legends' Reunion later that month, he wrestled Tully Blanchard to a double disqualification. Later that evening, Funk attacked Dustin Rhodes, who was feuding with the Stud Stable. At Bash at the Beach in July 1994, Funk and stablemate Bunkhouse Buck defeated Dustin Rhodes and Arn Anderson when Anderson turned on Rhodes and defected to the Stud Stable. In September 1994 at Fall Brawl '94: War Games, the Stud Stable lost to Dustin Rhodes, Dusty Rhodes, and the Nasty Boys in a WarGames match. Funk left WCW once more in October 1994.

=== International Wrestling Association of Japan (1994–1995) ===
In November 1994, Funk joined the fledgling International Wrestling Association of Japan, defeating Miguel Pérez Jr. in Kanazawa Stadium. Over the course of a month, he competed in various gimmick matches, including teaming with Hiroshi Ono to defeat Nobutaka Araya and Shoji Nakamaki in a "hair vs. hair no ropes barbed wire fire death match" and teaming with Dick Slater to defeat the Headhunters in a "scramble bunkhouse death match".

Funk returned to IWA Japan in January 1995 as part of its "New Year '95: Bound To Break" tour, taking part in matches including teaming with Nakamaki in a loss to Cactus Jack and Tracy Smothers in a "no ropes barbed wire death match" and defeating Cactus Jack in a "no ropes barbed wire scramble bunkhouse death match". In March–April 1995, he took part in IWA Japan's "Get the Glory, Grab the Glory" tour, primarily facing the Headhunters.

In August 1995, Funk was a participant in IWA Japan's "King of the Death Match" tournament, staged as part of the IWA Kawasaki Dream show in Kawasaki Stadium. After defeating Leatherface in a "barbed wire board and chain match" and Tiger Jeet Singh in a "barbed wire board and glass match", Funk lost to Cactus Jack in a "no ropes barbed wire exploding barbed wire boards and exploding ring time bomb death match".

In December 1995, Funk took part in IWA Japan's "2nd Year Final Battle" tour. Teaming with Keisuke Yamada, Funk competed in a tournament for the vacant NWA World Tag Team Championship. Funk and Yamada finished joint second in the tournament with eight points.

=== Extreme Championship Wrestling (1995) ===
Funk returned to Eastern Championship Wrestling - by now renamed Extreme Championship Wrestling - at Return of the Funker in March 1995, establishing himself as a heel by aligning himself with the Sandman against Cactus Jack, with Shane Douglas coming to Jack's aid. At ECW Extreme Warfare later that month, Funk and the Sandman defeated Jack and Douglas when Funk pinned Jack after grinding a flaming branding iron on his chest and piledriving him onto the iron. At Hostile City Showdown in April 1995, Funk lost to Jack; after the match, he again attacked Jack with a flaming branding iron. Funk was subsequently absent for several months.

In October 1995, Funk returned to ECW to support Tommy Dreamer in his feud with Cactus Jack, who had turned heel by joining forces with Raven and adopting a cowardly disposition. On October 28, Funk accompanied Dreamer to ringside for a match with Jack, punching referee Bill Alfonso after he tried to allow Jack to walk out on the match. After the match, Funk and Dreamer brawled with Jack and Raven. During the brawl, Jack attempted to hit Funk with a flaming steel chair; as Jack swung the chair, the kerosene-soaked towel that had been affixed to the chair came loose and landed on Funk, legitimately badly burning his shoulder (a fan at ringside also burned his hand while trying to extinguish the flames on Funk). At November to Remember the following month, Funk and Dreamer defeated Jack and Raven. Funk subsequently departed ECW once more.

=== New Japan Pro-Wrestling (1995) ===
Funk debuted in New Japan Pro-Wrestling in May 1995 at the Wrestling Dontaku 1995, held in the Fukuoka Dome in Fukuoka, Japan, where he teamed with Shiro Koshinaka to defeat Hiromichi Fuyuki and Masahiro Chono. Later that month, at the Heisei Ishingun Origin event in Tokyo, Funk teamed with The Great Kabuki to defeat Chono and Sabu.

=== Extreme Championship Wrestling (1996–1997) ===
Funk returned to ECW at November to Remember 1996, substituting for the injured Pitbull #2 to team with Tommy Dreamer to defeat Shane Douglas and Brian Lee. At House Party in January 1997, Funk lost to Lee. At Crossing the Line Again in February 1997, Funk defeated Tommy Rich. After his win, Funk declared his intention of challenging Raven for the ECW World Heavyweight Championship. At CyberSlam later that month, Funk and Dreamer wrestled Lee and Raven to a no contest. At Hostile City Showdown in March 1997, Funk defeated Lee. Over the following weeks, Funk and Dreamer continued to feud with Raven, Lee, and Douglas.

On April 13, 1997, Funk headlined ECW's first pay-per-view, Barely Legal, winning the ECW World Heavyweight Championship from Raven. Earlier in the night, he defeated The Sandman and Stevie Richards in a triple threat match, thus earning him the match with Raven. Funk went on to successfully defend the title in bouts at ECW Chapter 2, The Buffalo Invasion, Wrestlepalooza, and Heat Wave. He was ultimately defeated for the title by Sabu in a barbed wire match at Born to be Wired in August 1997, in which the ropes of the ring were taken down and replaced with barbed wire. Both men had to be cut out of the wires at the end of the match. Sabu had his biceps visibly torn open by the barbed wire – as a result, the wound was taped up and the match continued. Funk wrestled his final ECW match later that month at Hardcore Heaven - ECW's second pay-per-view - competing in a three way elimination match for Sabu's ECW World Heavyweight Championship that was won by Shane Douglas.

In September 1997, a show was held in Funk's hometown of Amarillo. It was called "Terry Funk's WrestleFest" and was both his own show and a celebration of the careers of Terry, his father, and his brother. Terry lost to then-WWF Champion Bret Hart in the main event, a non-title match. Beforehand, ECW owner Paul Heyman presented Terry with a belt, paid for through a collection taken up by wrestlers on the ECW roster, that declared him the Lifetime ECW World Heavyweight Champion.

=== World Wrestling Federation (1997–1998) ===
After an absence of over 10 years, Funk returned to the World Wrestling Federation in January 1997. On the January 18, 1997 episode of Shotgun Saturday Night (filmed in San Antonio, Texas), Funk was interviewed in the ring by Todd Pettengill about his participation in the upcoming Royal Rumble match; during the interview, Funk called Pettengill's mother "a whore" and Vince McMahon a "Yankee bastard", then instigated a brawl with Stone Cold Steve Austin on color commentary. Later that month, Funk competed in the 1997 Royal Rumble match, entering at number 24 and lasting 15 minutes and 18 seconds before being eliminated by Mankind.

Funk made his return to the WWF on the December 29, 1997, episode of Raw as the masked "Chainsaw Charlie" (although his true identity was soon acknowledged by the announcers). According to Funk, he selected the "Chainsaw Charlie" persona in reference to a barber, and assembled the character's outfit himself ("...I got the suspenders from Howard, took Bruce's Levi's and I had that shirt on, borrowed a pair of pantyhose from Chyna, cut one leg out of them and there came Chainsaw Charlie.")

Chainsaw Charlie formed a tag team with his former ally and rival Cactus Jack. The duo began feuding with the New Age Outlaws, who defeated them by disqualification on the January 26, 1998 episode of Raw. The following week on Raw, Charlie and Jack had a match against each other, with the match ending in a no contest after the New Age Outlaws attacked both men, placing them both in a dumpster and then pushing it off the stage. At No Way Out of Texas: In Your House, Charlie and Jack teamed with Stone Cold Steve Austin and Owen Hart, defeating the team of Triple H, Savio Vega and the New Age Outlaws. At WrestleMania XIV, Charlie and Jack defeated the New Age Outlaws in a dumpster match to win the WWF Tag Team Championship. The following night, on the March 30 episode of Raw, Charlie and Jack lost the titles back to the New Age Outlaws in a cage match.

On the April 13, 1998 episode of Raw, Funk began wrestling as himself and formed a tag team with 2 Cold Scorpio. The team was short lived but did defeat the likes of the Quebecers and the Midnight Express. On the May 4 episode of Raw, Funk was defeated by Foley in a no holds barred match. On the June 1 episode of Raw, Funk was defeated by Mark Henry in a King of the Ring qualifying match. During the King of the Ring pay-per-view, Funk interfered in the Mankind vs. The Undertaker Hell in a Cell match, receiving a chokeslam from The Undertaker.

Funk then formed a short lived tag team with Justin Bradshaw, which defeated Too Much on the July 25 episode of WWF Shotgun Saturday Night. At Fully Loaded: In Your House, Funk and Bradshaw were defeated by Faarooq and 2 Cold Scorpio, with Bradshaw attacking Funk after the match. Funk left the WWF once again the following month.

=== Extreme Championship Wrestling (1998–1999) ===
Funk returned to ECW at November to Remember 1998, where Tommy Dreamer and a mystery partner were to face Justin Credible and Jack Victory in a Stairway to Hell match. After Funk expressed his anger at Dreamer for not choosing him as his mystery partner (as he had done at November to Remember 1995 and November to Remember 1996), Dreamer explained that Funk wanted a lighter schedule so did not want to get him involved, but Funk walked off in anger. During the opening bout between Blue World Order and Danny Doring and Amish Roadkill, Funk slapped The Blue Meanie, then attacked the Blue World Order after the match. Later in the evening, after Dreamer and his mystery partner Jake "the Snake" Roberts defeated Credible and Victory, Funk again confronted Dreamer, then attacked him. At Guilty as Charged in February 1999, Dreamer faced Credible in another Stairway to Hell match. During the match, Funk attacked Dreamer with a trashcan, enabling Credible to win the match. After the match, Funk continued to attack Dreamer, who refused to fight back due to his respect for Funk. A planned match between Funk and Dreamer at Living Dangerously in March 1999 did not materialise when Funk became ill with hepatitis, side-lining him for several months.

=== Return to WCW (2000–2001) ===
Funk returned to World Championship Wrestling in January 2000 after an absence of five years, being named the WCW Commissioner by WCW President Bill Busch. Shortly after arriving, Funk formed a stable dubbed the "Old Age Outlaws" (a play on the New Age Outlaws) alongside Arn Anderson, Larry Zbyszko, and Paul Orndorff to oppose the New World Order (nWo). His first match upon returning saw him wrestle nWo member Bret Hart to a no contest in a hardcore match that aired on WCW Thunder. At Souled Out on January 16, Funk faced nWo leader Kevin Nash in a hardcore match with the stipulation that if Funk won, the nWo would disband, but if Nash won, he would replace Funk as WCW Commissioner. The match was won by Nash.

Funk went on to feud with Ric Flair, including losing to Flair's son David in an "I Quit" match on WCW Monday Nitro. The feud culminated in a Texas death match at SuperBrawl in February 2000 that was won by Flair. Funk then went on to feud with Dustin Rhodes, losing to Rhodes in a bullrope "I Quit" match at Uncensored in March 2000.

In April 2000, Funk began competing in WCW's hardcore division. At Spring Stampede later that month he defeated Norman Smiley to win the vacant WCW Hardcore Championship. At Slamboree, Funk defeated Smiley and Ralphus to successfully defend the title. He lost the title to Shane Douglas the following month, but regained it several days later. His second reign ended in June 2000 when he lost to Eric Bischoff. In September 2000, Funk defeated Lance Storm for the WCW United States Heavyweight Championship at a house show in Amarillo, Texas. He lost the title back to Storm the following day. In December 2000 at Starrcade, Funk defeated Crowbar to win the WCW Hardcore Championship for a record third time. He made his final appearance with WCW at Sin in January 2001, losing the Hardcore Championship to Meng in a three way match that also involved Crowbar.

=== All Japan Pro Wrestling (2001–2003) ===
In January 2001, Funk returned to AJPW after an absence of close to a decade as part of its "King's Road New Century" event: a joint promotional event held in the Tokyo Dome featuring wrestlers from AJPW and New Japan Pro-Wrestling. Funk teamed with Atsushi Onita to defeat Abdullah the Butcher and Giant Kimala.

In October 2002, Funk wrestled for AJPW as part of its October Giant Series, primarily competing in six-man tag team matches. On October 27, he wrestled on AJPW's "Royal Road 30 Giant Battle in Budokan Final Battle" pay-per-view, teaming with Abdullah the Butcher to defeat Tarzan Goto and Tomoaki Honma in the Nippon Budokan.

In January 2003, Funk wrestled on AJPW's 2ND WRESTLE-1 pay-per-view in the Tokyo Dome, teaming with mixed martial artist Heath Herring as the "New Texas Broncos" in a loss to Hiroshi Hase and Satoshi Kojima. This marked Funk's penultimate match for AJPW, and his final match for the promotion for over 10 years.

=== Late career (2002–2017) ===
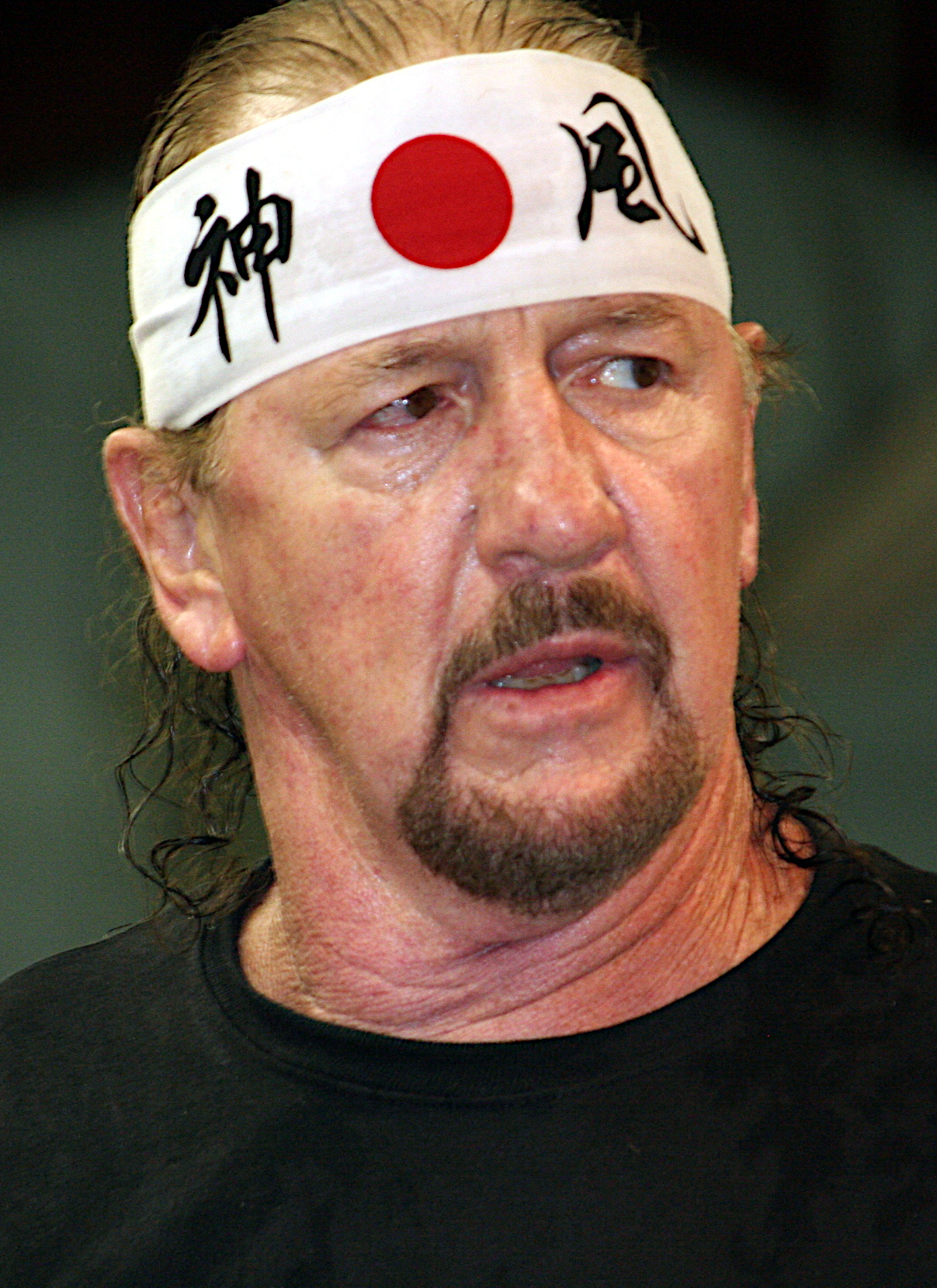
Funk in September 2013.

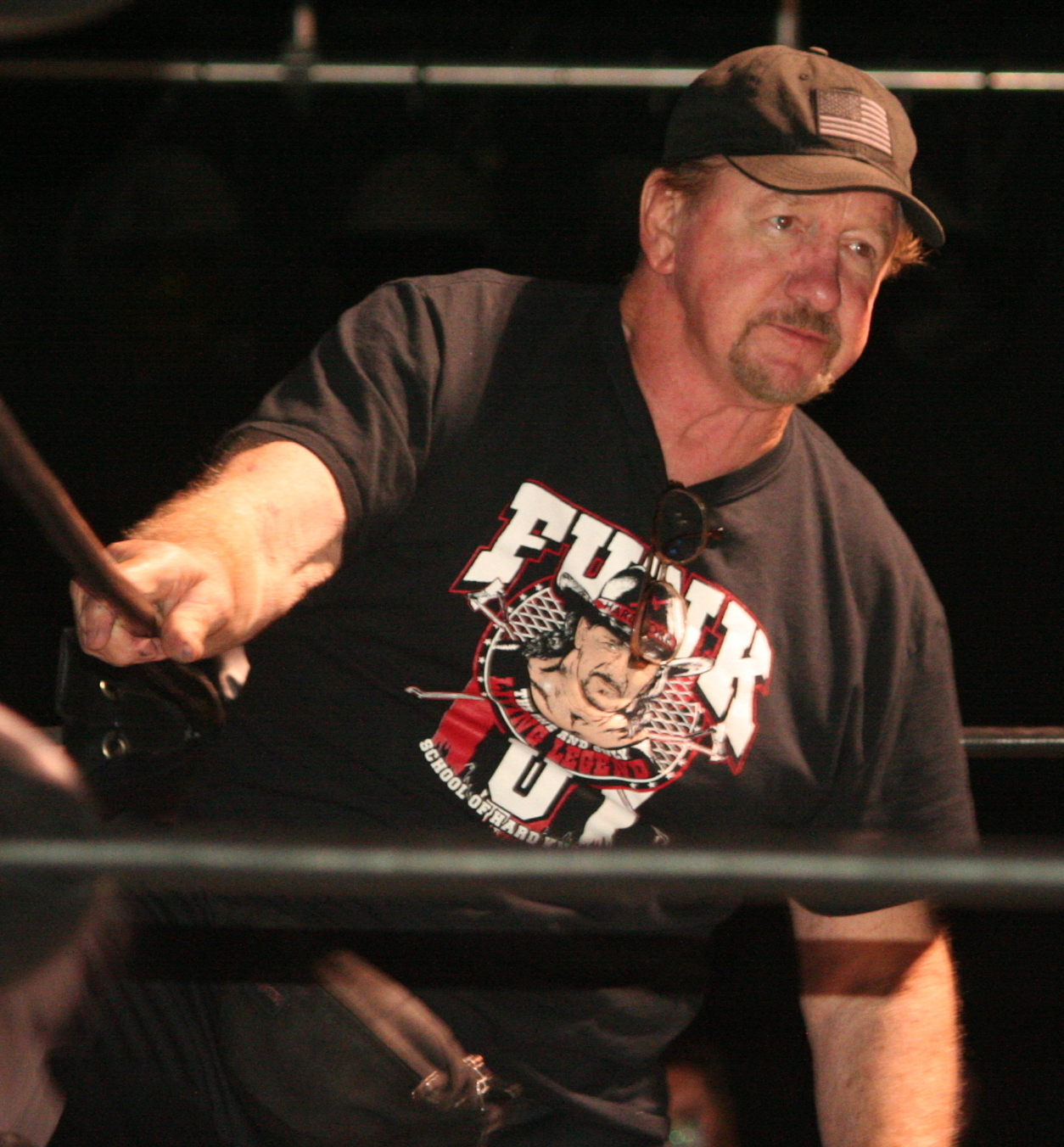
Funk appearing for PWS in 2015

From 2002 to 2004, Funk was a regular top star for Ring of Honor and Major League Wrestling. Funk had several battles with the likes of CM Punk and the Extreme Horsemen (Steve Corino, C. W. Anderson, Justin Credible and Simon Diamond) in specialty matches such as a No Ropes Barbed Wire Death Match, and a 5 on 5 WarGames match. On MLW's final show until 2017, Funk was attacked by his former manager Gary Hart and his syndicate.

On February 4, 2004, Funk appeared in NWA Total Nonstop Action, teaming with The Sandman in a loss to The Gathering (CM Punk and Julio Dinero). On February 18, 2004, Funk and Raven defeated The Gathering.

In November 2004, Funk competed in the UK wrestling company FWA's annual show entitled British Uprising. He teamed with Paul Burchill and Paul Travell, managed by "The Twisted Genius" Dean Ayass, to face The Triad, managed by Greg Lambert, in a 6-Man Tag Team match. Funk's team emerged victorious in front of a crowd of 2,000 people in the Coventry Skydome. In 2005, Funk received an offer from World Wrestling Entertainment to appear at the ECW reunion show One Night Stand, but turned it down in favor of working the ECW nostalgia show Hardcore Homecoming that was being put together by Shane Douglas. At Hardcore Homecoming, Funk lost a three-way barbed wire match to Sabu.

Funk returned to WWE on the May 15, 2006, episode of Raw, confronting Mick Foley over the attack on Tommy Dreamer on the previous weeks episode of Raw. At ECW One Night Stand on June 11, Funk teamed with Dreamer and Beulah McGillicutty to face Foley, Edge and Lita. Midway through the match, Foley injured Funk's left eye with barbed wire, and Funk was taken backstage. He later returned to the match (with a bloody cloth tied over his eye) to hit Foley with a flaming 2x4 wrapped in barbed wire. The match ended when Edge pinned McGillicutty.

In September 2006, Funk faced Jerry "The King" Lawler in an Extreme Rules match at the Great Plains Coliseum in Lawton, Oklahoma, for the promotion Impact Zone Wrestling. Funk was also the special guest referee during the Raven and Johnny Webb vs. Khan Kussion and Homeless Jimmy match at "Cold Day in Hell" on May 24.

Funk, along with his brother Dory, was inducted in the WWE Hall of Fame in 2009 by his longtime friend Dusty Rhodes.

On May 23, 2009, Funk made an unannounced appearance at a house show for Total Nonstop Action Wrestling. At the show, Funk joined longtime friend, Mick Foley, as special guest enforcers for a match between Scott Steiner and Samoa Joe.

In August 2009, Funk made a surprise appearance for Insane Clown Posse's Juggalo Championship Wrestling at the 10th Annual Gathering of the Juggalos. He served as special guest referee for a match between Viscera and 2 Tuff Tony. Funk also appeared at the annual NJPW January 4 Dome Show in 2010, teaming with Manabu Nakanishi, Masahiro Chono and Riki Choshu to defeat Abdullah the Butcher, Takashi Iizuka, Tomohiro Ishii and Toru Yano.

On September 11, 2010, at Ring of Honor's Glory By Honor IX, Funk worked as the ringside enforcer for the ROH World Championship match between Tyler Black and Roderick Strong. Funk appeared at the fifth WrestleReunion event at the LAX Hilton in Los Angeles, California, from January 28 to 30, 2011. On the second day of the event, he competed in a Legends Battle Royale on the Pro Wrestling Guerrilla show. He lasted until the end where he was eliminated by Roddy Piper. Funk wrestled Jerry Lawler unsuccessfully in a "No holds barred contest" for Northeast Wrestling on October 1, 2011. On October 15, 2011, Funk unsuccessfully faced his long-time friend and protégé Tommy Dreamer at the AWE "Night Of Legends" event. In a shoot interview conducted the next day featuring himself and Dreamer, Funk stated that he believed that would be his last match.

On January 12, 2013, Funk stated that he was retired from professional wrestling at age 68, On October 27, 2013, he returned to All Japan Pro Wrestling with Dory in a tag team match, wrestling Masanobu Fuchi and Osamu Nishimura to a 20-minute time limit draw; this was his final match for AJPW.

In April 2013, Funk inducted Mick Foley into the WWE Hall of Fame at a ceremony held in Madison Square Garden during the weekend of WrestleMania 29.

On December 11, 2014, Funk returned to Japan for a Tokyo Gurentai independent event, which saw him, Masakatsu Funaki, and Mil Máscaras defeat Kaz Hayashi, Nosawa Rongai, and Yoshiaki Fujiwara in a six-man tag team main event.

On October 16, 2015, Funk made an appearance at AIW's Big Trouble in Little Cleveland event, where he attacked Eddie Kingston and his manager, The Duke, destroying the concession stand in the process. On October 24, 2015, Funk had another retirement match at USA Championship Wrestling in Jackson, Tennessee, at Oman Arena against Jerry Lawler, Lawler went on to win by DQ.

Funk made a cameo appearance on the March 21, 2016, episode of Raw, giving Dean Ambrose a pep-talk for his match against Brock Lesnar at WrestleMania 32. At the conclusion of the segment, Funk presented Ambrose with a chainsaw, in reference to his previous gimmick as Chainsaw Charlie.

On September 17, 2016, at House of Hardcore 17, Funk once again announced his retirement. Funk made his final return to the ring on September 22, 2017, for the Big Time Wrestling promotion in Raleigh, North Carolina. He teamed with the Rock 'n' Roll Express in a six-man tag team match, where they defeated Doug Gilbert, Jerry Lawler and Lawler's son Brian Christopher via disqualification in what was Funk's last match.

== Other media ==
Funk's appearance in the 1978 Sylvester Stallone movie Paradise Alley would lead to numerous collaborations between Funk and Stallone. Funk would do stunts for Rocky III, and also recommended Hulk Hogan's appearance in the film to Stallone.

Terry Funk appeared as a bouncer in the movie Road House (1989) with Patrick Swayze. In 1999, Funk was featured in director Barry Blaustein's wrestling documentary Beyond the Mat. His legendary toughness was attested to when cameramen followed him to a medical appointment, where he was told by the doctor that he would not be able to walk without intense pain. He also appeared in other movies such as The Ringer, and 1987 Stallone film Over the Top. He released an autobiography, Terry Funk: More Than Just Hardcore, in 2005. On May 11, 2010, Funk appeared on "Right After Wrestling" with Arda Ocal on SIRIUS Satellite Radio to discuss his possible retirement, to which he replied "I never really truly will retire". This was also the interview with the infamous quote, "I dislike Vince (McMahon). I'm jealous of Vince."

In 1985, Funk appeared in the short-lived western Wildside. Only six episodes were aired. Behind the scenes, Funk choreographed the street fight between Rocky Balboa and his nemesis Tommy Gunn at the end of Rocky V. Funk's name can be seen in the end credits. Funk also had a short lived career in music. The release of the album "Great Texan" in 1984 which was a soft rock AOR oriented album. The album was met with mixed reviews and is generally considered a "cult classic" by fans. Funk also appeared in several WWE video games, in WWE SmackDown vs Raw 2008 and WWE SmackDown vs Raw 2011 as himself and in WWE '13 as downloadable content as his Chainsaw Charlie gimmick. He was also included as downloadable content for WWE 2K24, and WWE 2K25.

In July 2022, Terry Funk released his self-titled biographical comic book through Squared Circle Comics.

== Personal life ==
Funk married his wife Vicky Ann on August 14, 1965. They had two daughters together. For many years, Terry and Vicky owned a ranch in Canyon, Texas, which they later sold. Vicky died on March 29, 2019. Funk was close friends with NFL player John Ayers and Hollywood actor Sylvester Stallone. On September 12, 2016, Funk underwent surgery for an inguinal hernia, and was supposed to be resting and in bed for a couple of weeks, but chose to attend Tommy Dreamer's House of Hardcore shows.

In June 2021, fellow wrestling legend Don Muraco reported Funk was diagnosed as living with dementia and was living in an assisted living facility. On December 29, 2021, Ric Flair announced on his podcast with Mark Madden that Funk had returned home and was doing well.

== Death ==
On August 23, 2023, Funk died of complications from dementia at the age of 79, at a Phoenix-area hospital. The August 25 episode of SmackDown honored him and Bray Wyatt, who died the day after Funk, by airing tributes and behind-the-scenes footage; the episode also held a namesake "hardcore" tag team match between The Brawling Brutes and the Street Profits.

== Championships and accomplishments ==
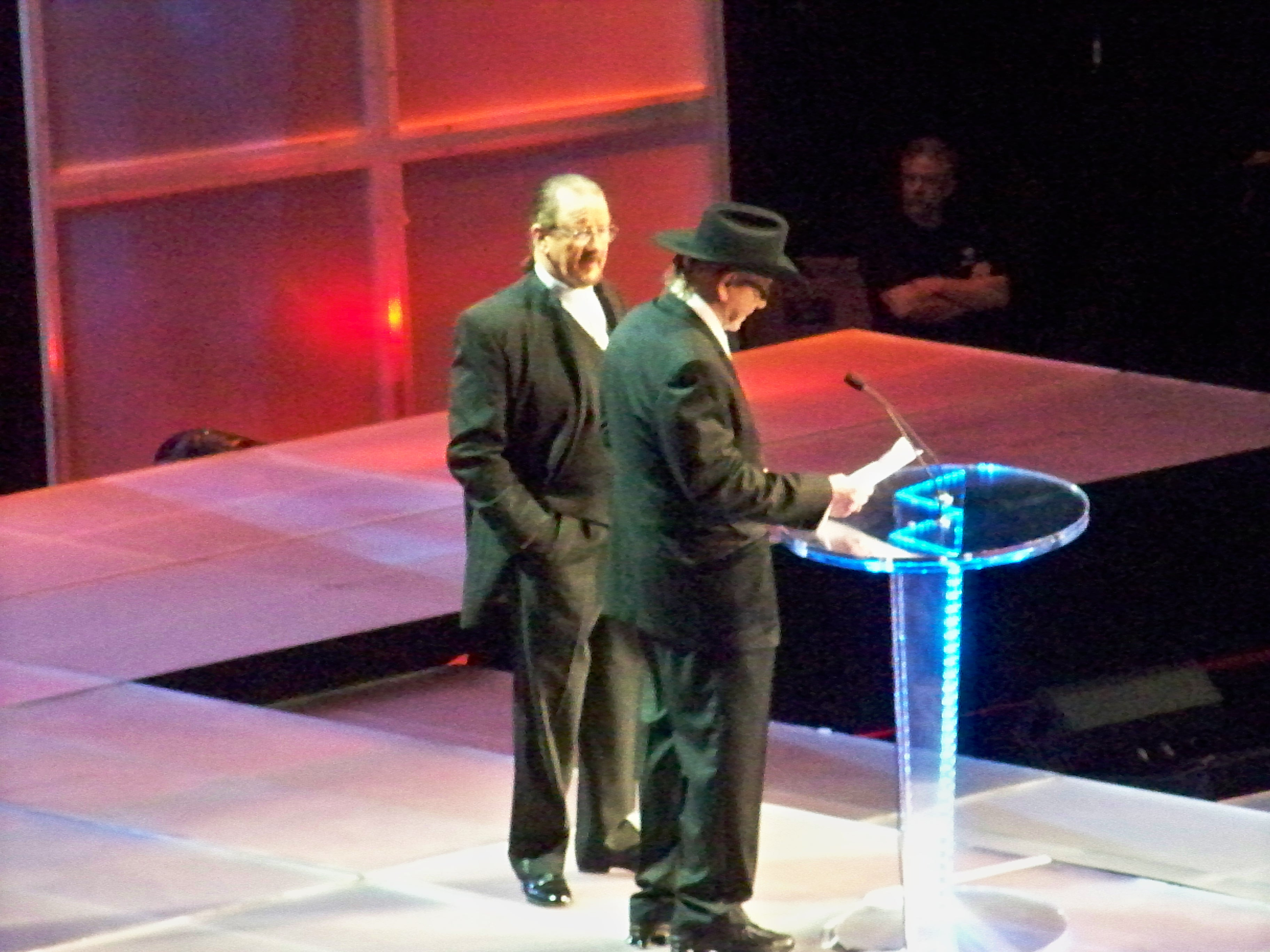
Terry (left) and his brother Dory Funk Jr. were inducted into the WWE Hall of Fame in 2009.

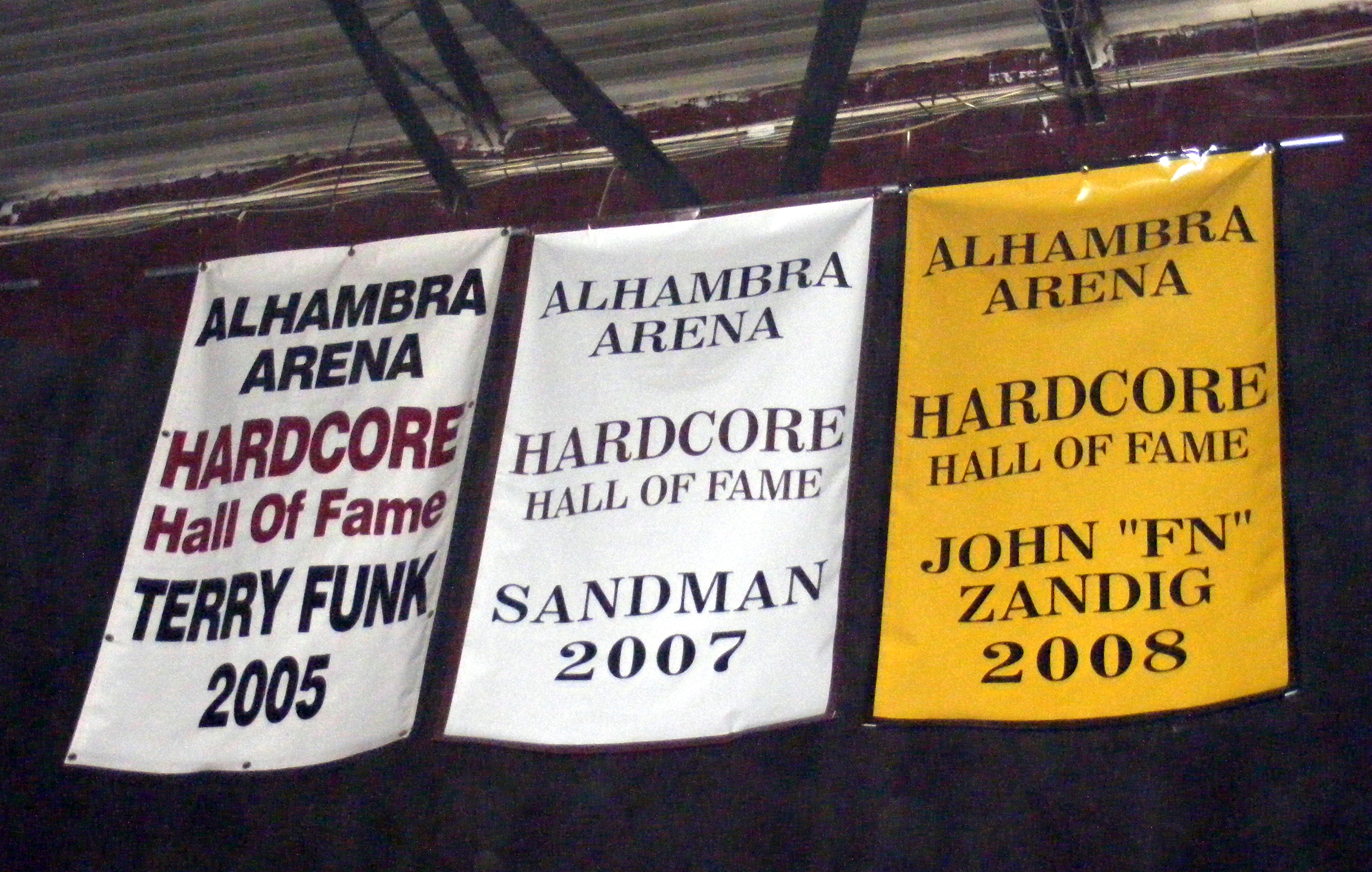
Funk's Hardcore Hall of Fame banner in the former ECW Arena

- All Japan Pro Wrestling
  - World's Strongest Tag Determination League (1977, 1979, 1982) – with Dory Funk Jr.
  - Champion Carnival Distinguished Service Award (1980)
  - World's Strongest Tag Determination League Technical Award (1977) – with Dory Funk Jr.
  - World's Strongest Tag Determination League Teamplay Award (1980) – with Dory Funk Jr.
  - World's Strongest Tag Determination League Distinguished Service Medal Award (1984) – with Dory Funk Jr.
  - World's Strongest Tag Determination League Technique Award (1986) – with Dory Funk Jr.
  - World's Strongest Tag Determination League Technique Award (1987) – with Dory Funk Jr.
  - World's Strongest Tag Determination League Excellent Team Award (1990) – Dory Funk Jr.
- Big Time Wrestling
  - BTW United States Heavyweight Championship (Detroit Version) (1 time)
- Cauliflower Alley Club
  - Iron Mike Mazurki Award (2005)
- Championship Wrestling from Florida
  - NWA Florida Heavyweight Championship (1 time)
  - NWA Florida Tag Team Championship (2 times) – with Dory Funk Jr.
  - NWA Florida Television Championship (1 time)
  - NWA North American Tag Team Championship (Florida version) (1 time) – with Dory Funk Jr.
  - NWA Southern Heavyweight Championship (Florida version) (2 times)
  - NWA Florida Television Championship Tournament (1971)
  - NWA Florida Heavyweight Championship Tournament (1979)
- Eastern Championship Wrestling / Extreme Championship Wrestling
  - ECW Television Championship (1 time)
  - ECW World Heavyweight Championship (2 times)
  - Lifetime Achievement Award (1997)
- George Tragos/Lou Thesz Professional Wrestling Hall of Fame
  - Class of 2010
- Georgia Championship Wrestling
  - NWA Georgia Tag Team Championship (1 time) – with Dory Funk Jr.
  - NWA Georgia Television Championship (1 time)
  - NWA Georgia Tag Team Championship Tournament (1978) – with Dory Funk Jr.
- Hardcore Hall of Fame
  - Class of 2005
- International Professional Wrestling Hall of Fame
  - Class of 2021
- Jim Crockett Promotions / World Championship Wrestling
  - NWA United States Championship Tournament (1975)
  - NWA United States Heavyweight Championship (Mid-Atlantic version) / WCW United States Heavyweight Championship (2 times)
  - WCW Hardcore Championship (3 times)
  - WCW Hall of Fame (Class of 1995)
- Juggalo Championship Wrestling
  - JCW Heavyweight Championship (1 time)
- National Wrestling Alliance
  - NWA Hall of Fame (Class of 2009)
  - NWA World Heavyweight Championship (1 time)
- NWA Big Time Wrestling
  - NWA Brass Knuckles Championship (Texas version) (1 time)
- NWA Hollywood Wrestling
  - NWA Americas Heavyweight Championship (1 time)
  - NWA International Tag Team Championship (3 times) – with Dory Funk Jr.
  - NWA World Tag Team Championship (Los Angeles version) (1 time) – with Dory Funk Jr.
- Pro-Pain Pro Wrestling
  - 3PW World Heavyweight Championship (1 time)
- Pro Wrestling Illustrated
  - PWI Feud of the Year (1989) vs. Ric Flair
  - PWI Most Inspirational Wrestler of the Year (1997)
  - PWI Stanley Weston Award (2021)
  - PWI Wrestler of the Year (1976)
  - Ranked No. 22 of the top 500 singles wrestlers in the PWI 500 in 1991
  - Ranked No. 9 of the top 100 tag teams of the PWI Years with Dory Funk Jr. in 2003
- Professional Wrestling Hall of Fame and Museum
  - Class of 2004
- Southwest Championship Wrestling
  - SCW Southwest Heavyweight Championship (1 time)
  - SCW World Tag Team Championship (1 time) – with Dory Funk Jr.
- Squared Circle Wrestling
  - 2CW Heavyweight Championship (1 time)
- St. Louis Wrestling Hall of Fame
  - Class of 2010
- St. Louis Wrestling Club
  - NWA Missouri Heavyweight Championship (1 time)
- Stampede Wrestling
  - Stampede Wrestling Hall of Fame (Class of 1995)
- Tokyo Sports
  - Lifetime Achievement Award (1983)
  - Match of the Year Award (1980) with Dory Funk Jr. vs. Giant Baba and Jumbo Tsuruta on December 11
  - Popularity Award (1979)
- United States Wrestling Association
  - USWA Unified World Heavyweight Championship (1 time)
- Western States Sports
  - NWA Brass Knuckles Championship (Texas version) (2 times)
  - NWA International Tag Team Championship (2 times) – with Dory Funk Jr.
  - NWA Western States Heavyweight Championship (12 times)
  - NWA Western States Tag Team Championship (3 times) – with Ricky Romero (2 times) and The Lawman (1 time)
  - NWA World Tag Team Championship (Amarillo version) (3 times) – with Dory Funk Jr.
  - NWA World Tag Team Championship (Texas version) (2 times) – with Dory Funk Jr.
- World Wrestling Federation / World Wrestling Entertainment
  - WWF Tag Team Championship (1 time) – with Cactus Jack
  - WWE Hall of Fame (Class of 2009)
- Wrestling Observer Newsletter
  - Best Brawler (1989)
  - Best Heel (1989)
  - Best on Interviews (1989)
  - Hardest Worker (1989)
  - Feud of the Year (1989) vs. Ric Flair
  - Wrestling Observer Newsletter Hall of Fame (Class of 1996)

== Filmography ==
=== Film ===
Year	Title	Role	Notes
1978	Paradise Alley	Frankie "The Thumper"	Also stunt coordinator
1987	Over the Top	Ruker	
1987	Timestalkers	Bearded Cowboy	
1989	Road House	Morgan	
1998	Mom, Can I Keep Her?	Ed "Jungle Ed"	
1999	Active Stealth	Morgan	
1999	Beyond the Mat	Himself	Documentary
2004	Friday Night Lights	Fan	Uncredited
2005	The Ringer	Frankie	

=== Television ===
Year	Title	Role	Notes
1985	Wildside	Prometheus Jones	Recurring: 6 episodes
1991	Swamp Thing	J.J. Dax	Episode: "The Prometheus Parabola"
1991	Quantum Leap	Carl Shilo	Episode: Heart of a Champion – July 23, 1955
1992	Tequila and Bonetti	Sergeant Nuzo	Recurring: 11 episodes
1993	The Adventures of Brisco County, Jr.	Defendant	Episode: "Pilot"
1994	Thunder in Paradise	Amarillo Doaks	Episode: "Queen of Hearts"
1998	Beyond Belief: Fact or Fiction	Dirk Simmons	Episode: "The Wrestler"
2021	Dark Side of the Ring	Himself	Episode: "Blood & Wire: Onita's FMW"

== Discography ==
- Texas Bronco (1983)
- Great Texan (1984)
- Tougher Than Shoe Leather (2018)

== Bibliography ==
- More Than Just Hardcore (2013)
- Terry Funk (2022)
