= Slamboree (1997) =

1997 World Championship Wrestling pay-per-view event

- Promotional poster featuring Lex Luger
- Promotion: World Championship Wrestling
- Date: May 18, 1997
- City: Charlotte, North Carolina
- Venue: Independence Arena
- Attendance: 9,643
- Buy rate: 220,000
- Tagline: The Tradition Continues...

Pay-per-view chronology
← Previous; Spring Stampede	Next → The Great American Bash

Slamboree chronology
← Previous; 1996	Next → 1998

The 1997 Slamboree was the fifth Slamboree professional wrestling pay-per-view (PPV) event produced by World Championship Wrestling (WCW). It took place on May 18, 1997 from the Independence Arena in Charlotte, North Carolina.

Eleven matches were contested at the event, including two dark matches. In the main event, Ric Flair, Roddy Piper and Kevin Greene defeated the nWo (Kevin Nash, Scott Hall and Syxx). In other prominent matches, Steve McMichael defeated Reggie White, Meng defeated Chris Benoit in a Death match, Dean Malenko defeated Jeff Jarrett to retain the WCW United States Heavyweight Championship, and in the opening bout, Lord Steven Regal defeated Ultimate Dragon to win the WCW World Television Championship.

== Storylines ==
The event featured professional wrestling matches that involve different wrestlers from pre-existing scripted feuds and storylines. Professional wrestlers portray villains, heroes, or less distinguishable characters in the scripted events that build tension and culminate in a wrestling match or series of matches.

== Event ==
Other on-screen personnel
Role:	Name:
Commentators	Tony Schiavone
Commentators	Bobby Heenan
Commentators	Dusty Rhodes
Interviewer	Gene Okerlund
Ring announcers	David Penzer
Ring announcers	Michael Buffer
Referees	Randy Anderson
Referees	Mark Curtis
Referees	Scott Dickinson
Referees	Mickie Jay
Referees	Nick Patrick

Prior to the pay-per-view there were two dark matches. During the first match, Yuji Nagata defeated Pat Tanaka. During the second match, The Public Enemy (Rocco Rock and Johnny Grunge) defeated Harlem Heat (Booker T and Stevie Ray).

During the open match of the pay-per-view, Lord Steven Regal defeated Ultimate Dragon to win the WCW World Television Championship. Sonny Onoo who came to the ring with Dragón, accidentally kicked Dragón giving Regal the opening to record the victory via submission with the Regal Stretch.

In the next match, Madusa defeated Luna Vachon, followed by Rey Misterio Jr. defeating Yuji Yasuraoka, and Glacier defeating Mortis via disqualification.

During the WCW United States Heavyweight Championship, Dean Malenko successfully retained his title against Jeff Jarrett. During the match, Steve McMichael came to the ring and threw Jarrett back into the ring. This enabled Malenko to hit a powerbomb and ultimately picked up the victory via submission with the Texas Cloverleaf.

Meng then defeated Chris Benoit in a death match. Following this, The Steiner Brothers (Rick Steiner and Scott Steiner) defeated Konnan, and Hugh Morrus, followed by Steve McMichael defeating Reggie White.

During the main event, Ric Flair, Roddy Piper and Kevin Greene defeated nWo (Kevin Nash, Scott Hall and Syxx). Flair ultimately picked up the pinfall on Hall while in a figure-4 leglock, while Piper had Nash in a sleeper hold. This match marked Flair's first match in six months.

== Results ==
No.	Results	Stipulations	Times
1^{D}	Yuji Nagata defeated Pat Tanaka	Singles match	04:30
2^{D}	The Public Enemy (Rocco Rock and Johnny Grunge) defeated Harlem Heat (Booker T and Stevie Ray) (with Sister Sherri)	Tag team match	06:00
3	Lord Steven Regal defeated Ultimate Dragon (c) (with Sonny Onoo) by submission	Singles match for the WCW World Television Championship	16:04
4	Madusa defeated Luna Vachon	Singles match	05:09
5	Rey Misterio Jr. defeated Yuji Yasuraoka	Singles match	14:58
6	Glacier defeated Mortis (with James Vandenberg) by disqualification	Singles match	01:51
7	Dean Malenko (c) defeated Jeff Jarrett (with Debra) by submission	Singles match for the WCW United States Heavyweight Championship	15:03
8	Meng defeated Chris Benoit (with Woman) by submission	Death match	14:54
9	The Steiner Brothers (Rick and Scott) defeated Konnan and Hugh Morrus (with Jimmy Hart)	Tag team match	09:35
10	Steve McMichael (with Debra) defeated Reggie White (with Kent Johnston)	Singles match	15:17
11	Ric Flair, Roddy Piper and Kevin Greene defeated nWo (Kevin Nash, Scott Hall and Syxx)	Six-man tag team match	17:20
(c) / – the champion(s) heading into the match; D / – this was a dark match
