= Slamboree (2000) =

2000 World Championship Wrestling pay-per-view event

- Promotional poster featuring Buff Bagwell
- Promotion: World Championship Wrestling
- Date: May 7, 2000
- City: Kansas City, Missouri
- Venue: Kemper Arena
- Attendance: 7,165
- Buy rate: 65,000

Pay-per-view chronology
← Previous; Spring Stampede	Next → The Great American Bash

Slamboree chronology
← Previous; 1999	Next → Final

The 2000 Slamboree was the eighth and final Slamboree professional wrestling pay-per-view (PPV) event produced by World Championship Wrestling (WCW). It took place on May 7, 2000 at Kemper Arena in Kansas City, Missouri.

Ten matches were contested at the event. In the main event, Jeff Jarrett defeated David Arquette and Diamond Dallas Page in a Triple Cage match to win the WCW World Heavyweight Championship. In other prominent matches, Hulk Hogan defeated Billy Kidman, Sting defeated Vampiro, Shane Douglas defeated Ric Flair, and The Total Package defeated Buff Bagwell.

== Storylines ==
The event featured professional wrestling matches that involve different wrestlers from pre-existing scripted feuds and storylines. Professional wrestlers portray villains, heroes, or less distinguishable characters in the scripted events that build tension and culminate in a wrestling match or series of matches.

== Event ==
Other on-screen personnel
Role:	Name:
Commentators	Tony Schiavone
Commentators	Scott Hudson
Commentators	Mark Madden
Interviewers	Gene Okerlund
Interviewers	Mike Tenay
Referees	Mickie Jay
Referees	Nick Patrick
Referees	Charles Robinson
Referees	Billy Silverman
Referees	Jamie Tucker
Ring announcers	Michael Buffer (Main event)
Ring announcers	David Penzer

=== Undercard ===
During the opening match for the WCW Cruiserweight Championship, Chris Candido defeated The Artist Formerly Known as Prince Iaukea. Candido's manager Tammy Lynn Sytch attempted to hit The Artists manager Paisley with a chair, but hit The Artist instead. This enabled Candido to hit a piledriver and pick up the victory via pinfall.

The second bout was a match for the WCW Hardcore Championship in which Terry Funk successfully defended his title against Norman Smiley. Smiley was also accompanied to the ring with a masked man who turned out to be Ralphus.

The third bout was a singles match in which Shawn Stasiak defeated Curt Hennig via pinfall.

Prior to the fourth bout, Captain Rection (until then known as Hugh Morrus) stated that his gimmick was given to him by Eric Bischoff and he wanted to go by his real name Hugh G. Rection, or Captain Rection for short. Scott Steiner then successfully retained the WCW United States Heavyweight Championship against Captain Rection. Captain Rection attempted to hit Steiner with a moonsault, but Steiner moved out of the way and picked up the victory via submission with the Steiner Recliner.

The fifth bout was a singles match between Mike Awesome and Chris Kanyon that ended in a no contest decision. Kevin Nash came to the ring initially to attack Awesome, but was attacked by Billy Kidman, Shane Douglas, Vampiro and Chris Candido. Ric Flair and Sting then came to the ring to help Nash.

The sixth bout saw The Total Package defeat Buff Bagwell. Elizabeth attacked Vince Russo backstage and then hit Bagwell with a baseball bat, enabling Luger to pick up the victory via submission to the Torture Rack. Following the match, Chuck Palumbo came out and attacked Luger, applying Luger's own Torture Rack on him while Bagwell stopped Elizabeth from interfering.

In the seventh bout, Shane Douglas defeated Ric Flair. Prior to the match, it was announced that if Vince Russo would interfere in the match, Flair would get five minutes in the ring with Russo. During the match, a man wearing a Sting mask attacked Flair, which Flair believed to be Russo and demanded his five minutes. Luger returned in order to force the masked man into the ring, but Russo attacked Luger from behind while the masked man attacked Flair with a miniature Statue of Liberty. Russo demanded the five minutes start and the masked man revealed himself to be David Flair.

The eighth bout saw Sting defeat Vampiro via pinfall after hitting the Scorpion Death Drop twice.

The ninth bout saw Hulk Hogan defeat Billy Kidman with guest referee Eric Bischoff.

=== Main event ===
The main event was a three-tiered cage match for the WCW World Heavyweight Championship, with champion David Arquette defending against Jeff Jarrett and Diamond Dallas Page. The cage used was featured in the WCW-produced film Ready To Rumble, which featured Arquette and Page in starring roles and had premiered several weeks earlier in theaters nationwide.

The cages were stacked one on top of the other, and each had a roof atop it. The bottom cage contained the ring and a trap door, which led to the second cage which contained various weapons and a normal cage door to exit. Once outside the second cage, the wrestlers had to scale it to reach the third, much smaller cage. The third cage, which was about the size of a storage closet and had a similar door, contained several guitars, lending to Jarrett’s signature move of breaking guitars over his opponent’s head, and hanging from the ceiling just above the roof of the third cage was the championship belt. The object was to be the first wrestler to gain possession of the belt, with the winner becoming champion.

Jarrett won the match after Arquette betrayed Page by hitting him with a guitar while all three men were on the roof of the second cage. Afterwards, Mike Awesome climbed the cage to attack Page. After Kanyon tried to intercept him, Awesome tossed him from the roof of the first cage onto the entrance ramp twenty feet below the ring.

== Reception ==
In 2013, Dylan Diot of 411Mania gave the event a rating of 5.0 [Not So Good], stating, "In terms of the wrestling, this was one of WCW's better PPVs of 2000. However, the wrestling still wasn't very good, which speaks to how poor the WCW product was at the time. The show was filled with nonsensical booking and the matches were ruined by the countless interference that advanced the stupid and idiotic storylines Russo and company were writing at the time. When you make a B-list actor your world champion, you know they're reaching the bottom of the barrel creatively. The show is worth a watch if [you're] interested in seeing what a joke WCW was becoming but otherwise it isn't worth your time."

== Results ==
No.	Results	Stipulations	Times
1	Chris Candido (c) (with Tammy Lynn Sytch) defeated The Artist (with Paisley)	Singles match for the WCW Cruiserweight Championship	07:59
2	Terry Funk (c) defeated Norman Smiley and Ralphus	Hardcore match for the WCW Hardcore Championship	10:03
3	Shawn Stasiak defeated Curt Hennig	Singles match	07:54
4	Scott Steiner (c) (with Midajah and Shakira) defeated General Rection	Singles match for the WCW United States Heavyweight Championship	09:24
5	Mike Awesome vs. Chris Kanyon ended in a no contest	Singles match	12:11
6	The Total Package (with Elizabeth) defeated Buff Bagwell	Singles match	09:30
7	Shane Douglas defeated Ric Flair	Singles match	08:46
8	Sting defeated Vampiro	Singles match	06:49
9	Hulk Hogan defeated Billy Kidman (with Torrie Wilson)	Singles match with Eric Bischoff as special guest referee	13:31
10	Jeff Jarrett defeated David Arquette (c) and Diamond Dallas Page	Triple Cage match for the WCW World Heavyweight Championship	15:29
(c) / – the champion(s) heading into the match
