= Omnia Shawkat =

Sudanese journalist and cultural media manager

- Born: 1987 (age 38–39); Omdurman, Sudan
- Education: American University in Cairo, Vrije Universiteit Amsterdam
- Occupations: journalist and digital cultural media manager
- Years active: 2015–present
- Notable credit: co-founder of Andariya online magazine

Omnia Shawkat (born 1987) is a Sudanese journalist, digital stories and cross-cultural curator. She is co-founder and manager of the cultural online platform Andariya, based in Sudan, South Sudan and Uganda, covering other countries in East Africa and the Horn of Africa as well.

Since 2015, she has become known for her activities in East Africa of networking for online media and cultural journalism. In her own articles about women's rights, as well as women's involvement in society and media, she has published analytical discussions on the contribution of women to the Sudanese revolution and on the importance of digital media for civic engagement.

== Life and career ==
According to #defyhatenow, a community based organisation registered in South Sudan, Shawkat graduated with a Bachelor of Science in Biology with a focus on Environmental Studies from the American University in Cairo in 2008. She has a master's degree in Environment and Resource Management with a focus on Water and Climate Policy from the Vrije Universiteit in Amsterdam, the Netherlands. She first worked in development and environmental management for a number of years, but changed her professional activities to cultural management and online journalism, when she settled in Khartoum, Sudan.

In 2022, Wini Omer and Omnia Shawkat edited the book (Un)doing Resistance. Authoritarianism and Attacks on the Arts in Sudan’s 30 Years of Islamist Rule. Written by anthropologist Ruba El Melik and journalist Reem Abbas, this study is centered on Sudan's contemporary art history and the oppression by the Islamist government of Omar al-Bashir, leading up to the Sudanese revolution of 2018/19.

== Andariya online magazine ==
In 2015, Shawkat and fellow Sudanese Salma Amin started Andariya, a bilingual online multimedia cultural platform and enterprise. Andariya was launched both in Sudan and South Sudan and expanded into Uganda in 2018. Since its start, this online magazine has been operating with a team of editors and graphic designers in both Sudans and more than 100 freelance creators in several countries. Andariya strives to provide stories about contemporary life in the Sudans and other countries in East Africa and thereby connecting their readers across borders. Operating without commercial sponsors, the magazine strives to provide independent, gender and technology focused digital news with a special focus on urban culture, regional diversity and digital graphic design of its texts, videos and images. Addressing a worldwide audience, all content is published both in Arabic and English.

We were particularly irked by the immense gap in independent, gender and technology focused, artful digital representation of the Sudans on the web. Acknowledging that both Sudan and South Sudan have deep troubles on various fronts, we wanted to do something that redefines how people see, feel about and engage on the Sudans on the internet.

— Salma Amin, Andariya Wants to Help put the Sudans on the Digital Map, Arabnet News Portal

As part of its activities to research and build databases on cultural developments in the region, Andariya magazine received a research grant by AFAC (Arab Fund for Arts and Culture) to collect, publish and share empirical case studies and analyzed data from five different cities in Sudan, representing the most dynamic artistic and grassroots activities and influence during the Sudanese revolution of 2018/2019.

== Advocacy for women's contribution to society and media ==
Shawkat and Amin also advocate for women's rights in the workplace and society at large. As reported by online news portal Arabnet, Shawkat was a speaker at a womenomics event in 2017 to discuss how the new generation can evolve professionally beyond the traditional workplace, blending creativity with business success, market share, and independence.

In their 2019 article entitled "Sudanese Women at the Heart of the Revolution", Shawkat and Sudanese journalist Reem Gaafar explained the reasons, actions and vital role of Sudanese women before and during the Sudanese revolution. An important aspect in their analysis is the role that social media platforms have provided for revolutionary mobilisation, where traditional media have failed.

== See also ==
- Media of Sudan
- Mass media in South Sudan
- Sudanese revolution
