= Omnitel =

Omnitel may refer to:

- Omnitel Lietuva, the former name of Telia Lietuva, a Lithuanian telecommunications company
- Omnitel Pronto Italia, the former name of Vodafone Italy, an Italian telecommunications company
