= Omni Coliseum =

Former indoor arena in Atlanta, Georgia, United States

- The Omni
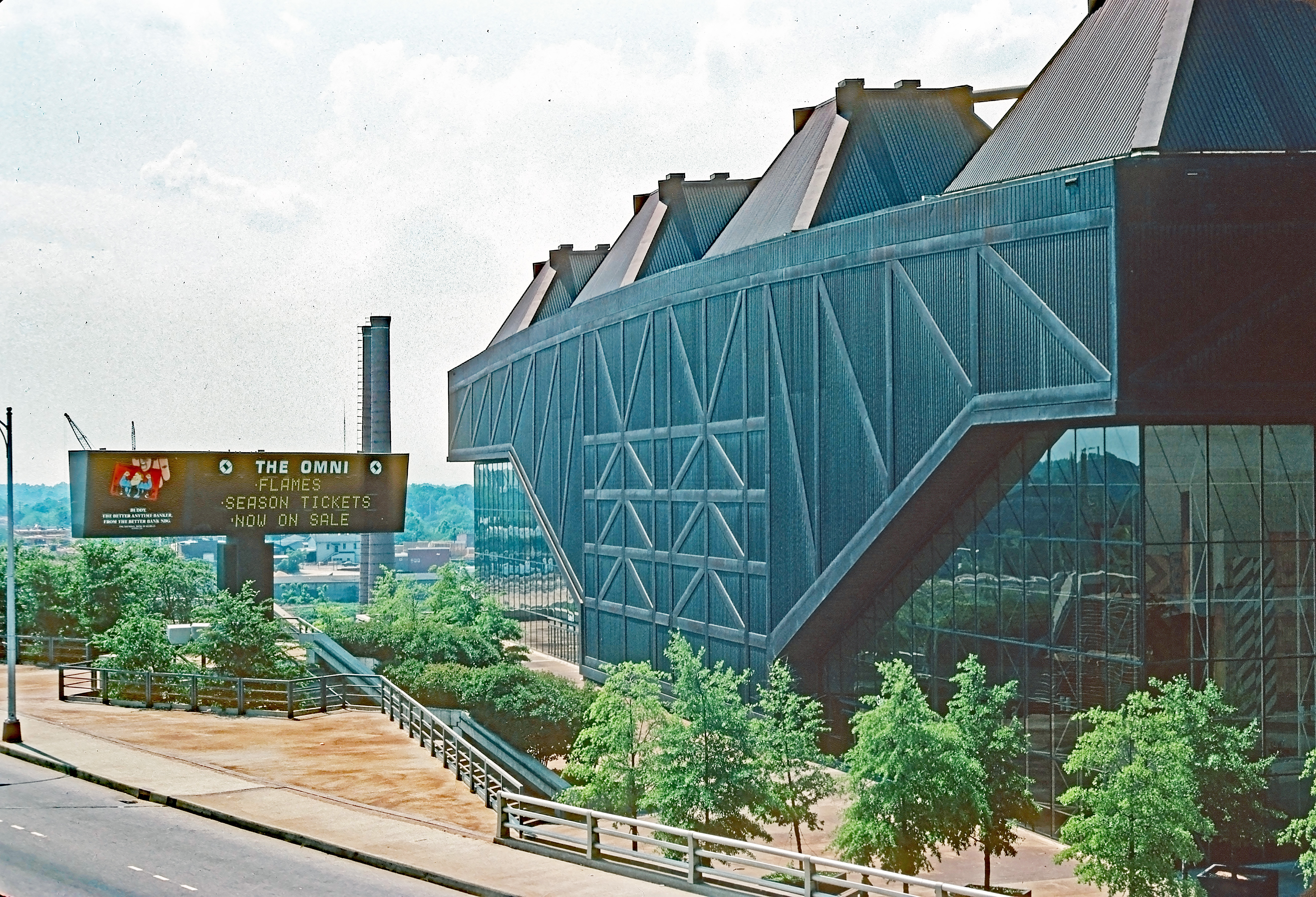
- The Omni in 1979
- Interactive map of Omni Coliseum
- Location: 190 Marietta St NW, Atlanta, GA 30303
- Coordinates: 33°45′27″N 84°23′48″W
- Owner: City of Atlanta
- Operator: City of Atlanta
- Capacity: Basketball: 16,181 (1972–1977), 16,400 (1977–1984), 16,522 (1984–1987), 16,451 (1987–1988), 16,371 (1988–1990), 16,390 (1990–1991), 16,425 (1991–1992), 16,441 (1992–1993), 16,368 (1993–1994), 16,378 (1994–1997); Hockey: 15,078 (1972–1973), 15,141 (1973–1977), 15,155 (1977–1983), 15,278 (1984–1997)

Construction
- Groundbreaking: March 30, 1971; 55 years ago
- Opened: October 14, 1972; 54 years ago
- Closed: May 11, 1997; 29 years ago
- Demolished: July 26, 1997; 29 years ago
- Cost: $17 million ($131 million in 2025 dollars)
- Architect: Thompson, Ventulett, Stainback & Associates
- Structural engineers: Prybylowski and Gravino, Inc.
- Services engineers: Lazensky & Borum, Inc.
- General contractor: Ira H. Hardin Company

Tenants
- Atlanta Hawks (NBA) (1972–1997); Atlanta Flames (NHL) (1972–1980); Atlanta Chiefs (NASL Indoor) (1979–1981); Atlanta Attack (AISA/NPSL) (1989–1991); Atlanta Knights (IHL) (1992–1996); Atlanta Fire Ants (RHI) (1994)

Omni Coliseum (often called The Omni) was an indoor arena in Atlanta, Georgia, United States. Completed in 1972, the arena seated 16,378 for basketball and 15,278 for hockey. It was part of the Omni Complex, now known as The Center.

It was the home arena for the Atlanta Hawks of the National Basketball Association (NBA) from 1972 until the arena's closure in 1997, and the Atlanta Flames of the National Hockey League (NHL) from their inception in 1972 until 1980, when the franchise was sold and relocated to Calgary, Alberta. The Omni hosted the 1977 NCAA Final Four, the 1978 NBA All-Star Game, the 1988 Democratic National Convention, and the 1996 Summer Olympics indoor volleyball competition.

The Omni was closed and demolished in 1997. Its successor, Philips Arena (now State Farm Arena), was constructed on the Omni's site and opened in 1999.

== Construction ==
In 1968, real estate developer Tom Cousins, and former Governor of Georgia Carl Sanders bought the NBA's St. Louis Hawks and relocated them to Atlanta, where Cousins made plans to build a new sports arena over an unused railroad gulch in the downtown area. The $17 million indoor arena with a total seating capacity of 16,500 would be named "The Omni", where its name comes from the Latin prefix meaning "all" or "every". Upon arriving in Atlanta, the Hawks played their home games at the Alexander Memorial Coliseum at Georgia Tech University from 1968 to 1972. Construction on the Omni began in April 1971, and was completed in October 1972.

=== Structure ===
The arena was considered an architectural marvel that combined innovative roof, seating, and structural designs. The logo is based on the unique seating arrangement.

The exterior cladding was composed of Cor-Ten weathering steel, which is covered in rust; the idea was that the steel would continue to rust to the point where the rusted exterior would form a protective seal, making a solid steel structure that would last for decades.

The Omni was noted for its distinctive space frame roof, often joked about as looking like an egg crate or a rusty waffle iron. Designed by the firm of tvsdesign with structural engineering work by the firm of Prybylowski and Gravino, the roof was technically described as an ortho-quad truss system.

=== Scoreboard ===
The only surviving component of the Omni Coliseum is its scoreboard, which now hangs in the pavilion of the State Farm Arena. American Sign & Indicator (which became Trans-Lux) built the basketball-specific scoreboard in the early 1980s to replace the original hockey-specific scoreboard. It was then maintained by Daktronics during the 1990s. The arena also had four message boards in each end zone, two of which were animation boards.

== Events ==
=== Professional wrestling ===
The Omni Coliseum was a hotbed for professional wrestling. Since its opening, it was considered the home base for the NWA's Georgia Championship Wrestling, Jim Crockett Promotions, and World Championship Wrestling. Many major and historic wrestling events took place at the Omni, including Starrcade (1985, 1986, 1989 and 1992), the first WarGames match during the Great American Bash tour (1987), and the first Slamboree in 1993. The World Wrestling Federation also held many events at the Omni including house shows and closed circuit broadcasts until their last card at the venue on November 2, 1992. WCW also aired Monday Nitro on January 1, 1996, and March 3, 1997, at the Omni.

=== Boxing ===
In July 1986, challenger Evander Holyfield beat WBA Light Heavyweight Champion Dwight Muhammad Qawi by split decision (144–140, 147–138, 141–143). The fight is widely regarded as one of the best fights in the history of boxing. Holyfield defeated Bert Cooper in a November 1991 fight at the Omni to retain his WBA & IBF Heavyweight titles.

=== Basketball and hockey ===
The Omni was home to the NBA's Atlanta Hawks from 1972 to 1997. The Hawks played their first game at the Omni on October 15, 1972, defeating the New York Knicks by a score of 109–101. Notable games at the Omni featured Dominique Wilkins scoring a career-high of 57 points twice in 1986; the first in a 126–117 win over the New Jersey Nets on April 10, and the second in a 123–95 win over the Chicago Bulls on December 10. The Hawks played their final game at the Omni in a Game 4 loss to Michael Jordan, and the Bulls in the Eastern Conference Semi-finals during the 1997 NBA playoffs, 89–80 on May 11, 1997.

The Omni was also home to the NHL's Atlanta Flames (now the Calgary Flames) from 1972 until 1980, and the Atlanta Knights of the IHL (1992–1996). In 1994, the Knights became the only pro team to win a championship in the building, when they won the Turner Cup.

In 1977, the arena hosted the NCAA Final Four, won by Marquette University over the University of North Carolina; it was Warriors' coach Al McGuire's last game. It also hosted one SEC and three ACC men's basketball tournaments, the 1978 NBA All-Star Game, the 1993 NCAA Women's Basketball Final Four, and the indoor volleyball matches for the 1996 Summer Olympics.

=== Indoor soccer ===
The Omni was the indoor home of the Atlanta Chiefs of the North American Soccer League, as well as the Atlanta Attack of the American Indoor Soccer Association.

=== Concerts ===
The Omni was Atlanta's primary concert venue from 1972 to 1997.

Phish played their Halloween show on October 31, 1996, and performed a musical costume in the second set; they played the Talking Heads album Remain in Light in its entirety. This show was later released as Live Phish Volume 15.

The Grateful Dead played at The Omni 24 times between 1973 and 1995, more than any other musical act.

The Jacksons performed for the Destiny World Tour in 1979 and for the Triumph Tour in 1981. Madonna brought both her Virgin Tour in 1985, and her Who's That Girl World Tour in 1987 to the Omni Coliseum. Michael Jackson performed for the Bad Tour in 1988. Elvis Presley played twelve sellout shows between June 1973 and December 1976. Judas Priest has also played this venue on a few occasions.

Def Leppard recorded footage from the October 7–9, 1988 shows at the Omni for their In the Round, in Your Face video. Paul McCartney and Wings played at the Omni on May 18 and May 19, 1976, during their Wings Over the World tour. Paul McCartney returned to the Omni with his band for concerts on February 18 and February 19, 1990. George Harrison played two concerts on November 24, 1974, on his only North American solo tour. Pink Floyd played at the Omni in November 1987 on their A Momentary Lapse of Reason Tour.

=== Other events ===
Among the major non-sports events at the Omni was the 1988 Democratic National Convention, where delegates nominated Michael Dukakis and Lloyd Bentsen for President and Vice President of the United States, respectively.

== Problems and replacement ==
Bird's-eye view of the Omni Coliseum

The Omni Coliseum did not last nearly as long as many other arenas built during the same time period, in part because a number of its innovations did not work as intended. Most seriously, its designers failed to reckon with Atlanta's humid subtropical climate, which specifically caused problems with the Cor-Ten exterior walls; the weathering steel never actually created the seal that had been envisioned and instead corroded to the point where holes large enough for a person to climb through began showing up along the perimeter of the building. In addition, the space frame roof of the building would often leak water as the designers did not anticipate the building settling into its foundation as quickly as it did.

In the late 1980s and early 1990s, a growing number of NBA and NHL teams began to construct arenas with better amenities for their high-end customers to increase revenue. These amenities included luxury boxes, club seating, and massive club concourses. Some of these new arenas had as many as 200 luxury boxes. By comparison, the Omni had only 16 luxury boxes and no club level. It also became a disadvantage during Atlanta's explosive population growth.

The Omni Coliseum during the 1996 Summer Olympics

Although the Omni hosted many events, it lost more than its share due to the smaller capacity and lack of amenities compared to newer buildings in other cities. By the start of the 1990s, an effort began to build a replacement. A new arena would have likely been needed in any event due to the Omni's structural problems. This also stemmed from Ted Turner's desire to own an NHL franchise; the Flames had been sold to Canadian businessmen and relocated to Calgary, Alberta a decade earlier. The NHL determined the Omni was not suitable even as a temporary facility, and would only grant Atlanta an expansion team if Turner guaranteed a brand-new arena would be in place by the time the new team took the ice.

Despite the arena's close proximity to the CNN Center, Georgia World Congress Center, and the Omni MARTA station, the Omni was imploded on July 26, 1997. The demolition of the Omni forced the Hawks to split their home games for the 1997–98, and 1998–99 seasons between the Alexander Memorial Coliseum, and the Georgia Dome. The Philips Arena (now State Farm Arena) was constructed in its place, and opened on September 18, 1999.

Events and tenants
Preceded by Alexander Memorial Coliseum	Home of the Atlanta Hawks; 1972 – 1997	Succeeded by Georgia Dome & Alexander Memorial Coliseum
Preceded by first arena	Home of the Atlanta Flames; 1972 – 1980	Succeeded by Stampede Corral
Preceded by The Spectrum	NCAA Men's Division I Basketball Tournament; Finals Venue; 1977	Succeeded by The Checkerdome
Preceded by MECCA Arena	Host of the NBA All-Star Game; 1978	Succeeded by Pontiac Silverdome
