= Gordon Solie =

American wrestling announcer

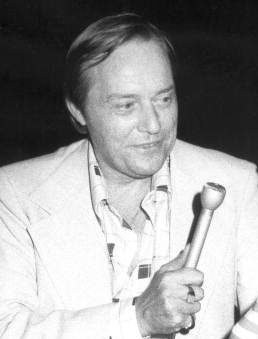
- Solie in 1979
- Born: Francis Jonard Labiak; January 26, 1929; Minneapolis, Minnesota, U.S.
- Died: July 27, 2000 (aged 71); New Port Richey, Florida, U.S.
- Other name: Jonard Pierre Sjoblom (adopted name)
- Occupation: Professional wrestling announcer
- Years active: 1950s–1995
- Spouse: Eileen Solie (d. 1997)
- Children: 5

Gordon Solie (born Francis Jonard Labiak, later Jonard Pierre Sjoblom, January 26, 1929 – July 27, 2000) was an American professional wrestling play-by-play announcer. He is best known for working for Georgia Championship Wrestling, Championship Wrestling from Florida, USA Championship Wrestling, Continental Championship Wrestling, and World Championship Wrestling. He is regarded by many as one of the greatest and most influential wrestling announcers.

== Early life ==
Solie was born on January 29, 1929, in Minneapolis, Minnesota. His parents divorced at a young age. His mother then remarried and her new husband adopted Gordon at the age of four. He attended Southwest High School in Minneapolis, where he chose radio as a major and went by the nickname "Josie". He ran the school PA system and participated in several high school productions and drama workshops at local radio stations. He moved to Tampa, Florida, in the 1950s after completing military service in the United States Air Force.

== Career ==
=== Stock car driving ===
Early in his career, Solie worked as a stringer. He learned about stock car racing by competing as an amateur chauffeur on Florida's Suncoast and announcing outdoors at tracks around the United States. He conducted radio interviews with other stock car drivers and boxers, and in his spare time, visited libraries to learn about the human anatomy.

=== Professional wrestling ===
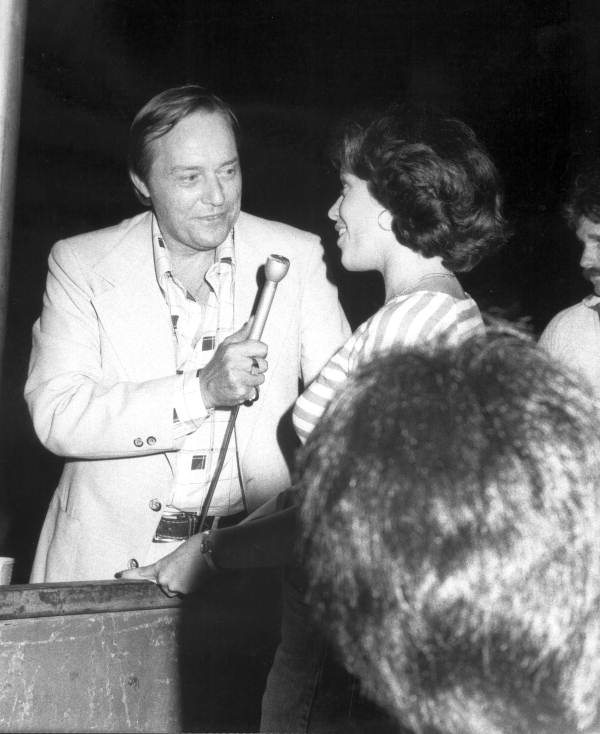
Solie interviewing a fan in 1979

Solie began his pro wrestling career as a ring announcer, making $5 a night emceeing weekly shows in the Tampa Bay area, learning about the sport from John Heath, Eddie Graham, and Don Curtis. He soon began working for Championship Wrestling from Florida, and in 1960, he moved into the broadcast booth to become the lead announcer for CWF's Saturday morning television shows, a spot he would occupy for the next quarter-century. During that time, he commentated on matches featuring some of pro wrestling's biggest legends, including WWE Hall of Famer Dusty Rhodes, The Brisco Brothers and Dory Funk Jr., among numerous others. Solie rose to national prominence when Superstation WTBS began broadcasting pro wrestling, and the exposure helped him branch out, leading to Solie working for promotions in Georgia, Alabama and Puerto Rico. A technique that Solie used was when he wasn't speaking words into a microphone, he actually recorded them on paper for remembering.

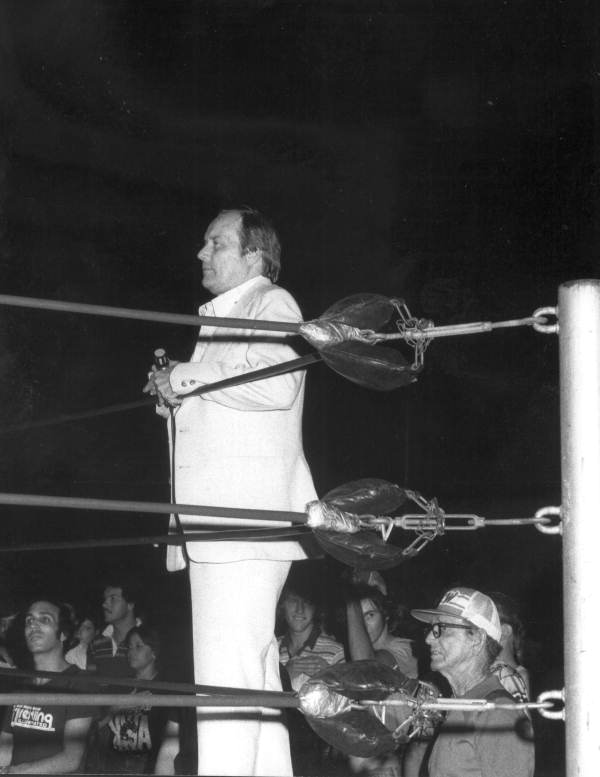
Solie at an NWA event in 1979

Much of his fame stems from the gravelly sound of his voice calling the in-ring action and his unique lingo, and is often called "The Walter Cronkite of Wrestling" or the “Howard Cosell of Wrestling." He sometimes is credited for popularizing the term "Pier-Six Brawl" (Note: However, the term "Pier 6 brawl" appears in print as early as 1933: "Risko is Victor over Levinsky in Ten Rounds". Chicago Tribune. February 25, 1933. p. 17. "It was a fine old Pier 6 brawl between a couple of the roughest warriors in the ring today...") to describe a wild brawl, and was also notorious for noting when a bloodied superstar was "wearing a crimson mask." His oft-imitated signature call of a suplex as a "su-play." His signature sign-off was: "So long from the Sunshine State (or if working in Georgia, "So long from the Peach State of Georgia,") followed by a wink.

In 1987, a board game, Gordon Solie's Championship Wrestling Trivia Game, was released by Sports Entertainment International, Inc. Solie eventually entered wrestling myth, and often stayed out of angles, but lots of them became historic once he was involved; one such angle was in Georgia when the Magnificent Muraco confronted Solie, threatening to hurt him. Solie's broadcast partner Roddy Piper saved Solie, turning babyface in the process.

According to wrestling lore, Solie had wrestlers that he was interviewing place him in holds so he could understand them better and call them more realistically, because he wanted to learn how it felt to be on the defensive end of a hold. He also made a point to never learn a wrestler or manager's real name because he wanted to avoid making the mistake of calling someone by any name other than the persona in which they were working. Following the folding of CWF in 1987, Solie returned to Georgia and became one of the lead announcers for the NWA (National Wrestling Alliance) later WCW television programs. Solie was once asked to join the World Wrestling Federation but declined the offer as the company wanted him to wear a tuxedo. Solie also worked for the Continental Wrestling Federation and USA Championship Wrestling based out of Knoxville.

That was a natural transition for "The Dean," who had also been Georgia Championship Wrestling's lead announcer before it became a subsidiary of NWA/WCW. He remained there until his eventual retirement in 1995; the last event he appeared in was the 1995 Slamboree. Solie had also worked for New Japan Wrestling as a commentator for overseas tapes and videos. Following his retirement from the sport, he started to dislike the product, saying it was a “damn shame” that wrestlers had turned into ‘roid freaks and lamented the lack of respect for the history of the business.

== Death and legacy ==
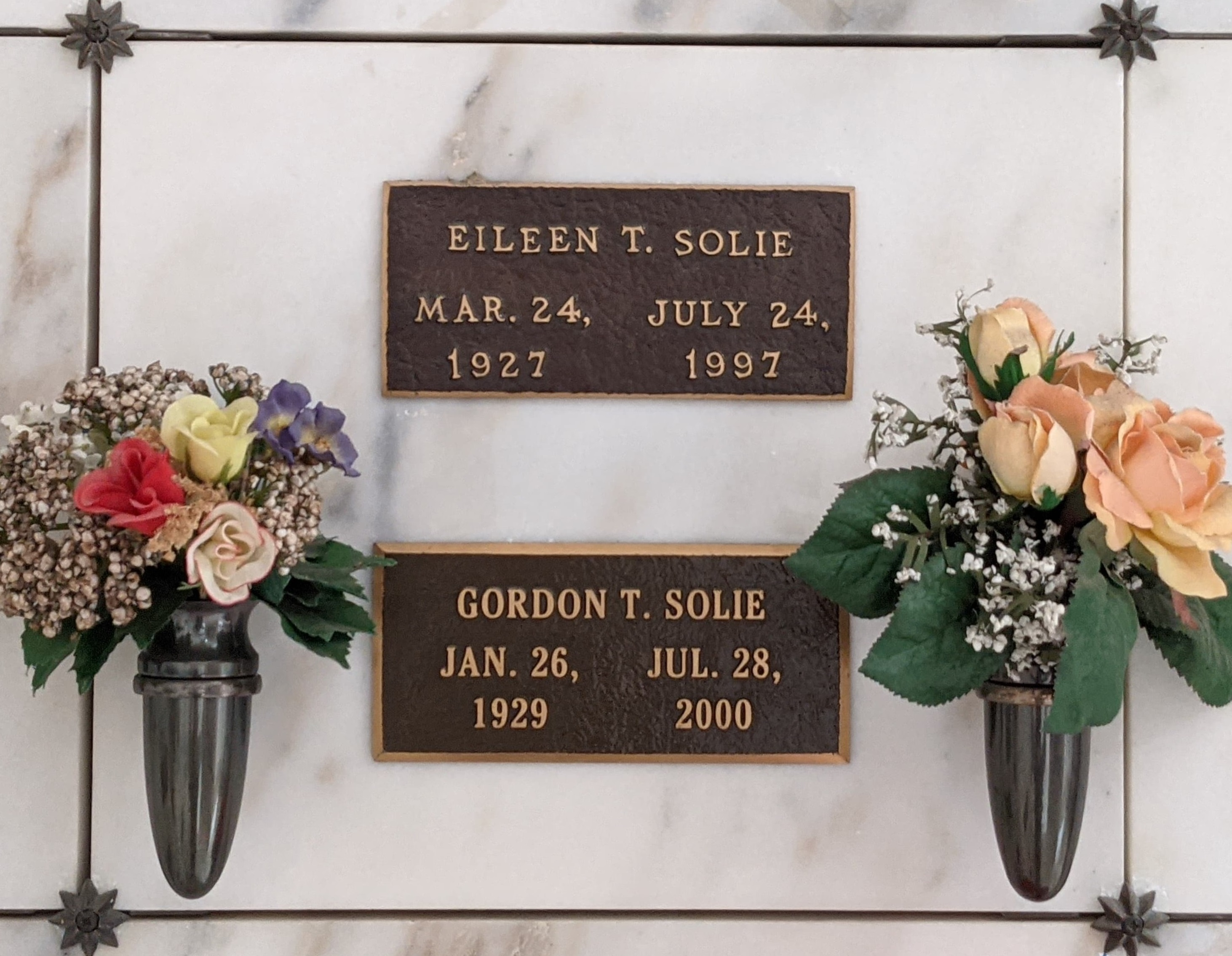
The crypt of Gordon and Eileen Solie in Tampa, Florida

Solie's last announcing job was to be the Heroes of Wrestling pay-per-view in 1999, but he could not attend due to failing health. He was diagnosed with cancer soon after his retirement, and in the late-1990s, his vocal cords were removed due to throat cancer. He died of the disease on July 27, 2000, at the age of 71. His wife Eileen (known to friends as "Smokey") had died three years before, also from cancer. In 2005, Florida Media, Inc. published a collection of Solie's short stories and poetry in Gordon Solie ... Something Left Behind. Solie was survived by his five children Pam, Jonard, Denise, Greg, and Eric.

In 2005, Solie's posthumously released memoir Gordon Solie ... Something Left Behind became a best-seller. On March 29, 2008, Jim Ross posthumously inducted Solie into the WWE Hall of Fame in the Class of 2008; appearing on Solie's behalf were his five children, Pam, Danise, Jonard, Eric and Greg. Later the same year WWE's WWE Classics on Demand video service began offering The Film Room with Gordon Solie, hosted by Ross, focusing on Solie's announcing and interviewing of a specific wrestler or group of wrestlers involved in a feud. On August 11, 2009, Solie's biography, The Solie Chronicles was released by Crowbar Press.

In 2013, Ryan Dilbert from the Bleacher Report stated, "Debating the greatest pro wrestling commentator comes down to two men, Jim Ross and Gordon Solie."

== Awards and accomplishments ==
- Cauliflower Alley Club
  - Other honoree (1996)
- George Tragos/Lou Thesz Professional Wrestling Hall of Fame
  - Gordon Solie Award (2021)
- National Wrestling Alliance
  - NWA Hall of Fame (Class of 2005)
- Pro Wrestling Illustrated
  - PWI Announcer of the Year (1977)
  - PWI Editor's Award (1989)
- Pro Wrestling This Week
  - Wrestler of the Week (August 9–15, 1987)
- Professional Wrestling Hall of Fame and Museum
  - (Class of 2004)
- World Championship Wrestling
  - WCW Hall of Fame (Class of 1995)
- World Wrestling Entertainment
  - WWE Hall of Fame (Class of 2008)
- Wrestling Observer Newsletter awards
  - Best Television Announcer (1981–1983)
  - Wrestling Observer Newsletter Hall of Fame (Class of 1996)
