= Mexicools =

Professional wrestling stable

Stable
- Members: Super Crazy; Psicosis; Juventud
- Name: Mexicools
- Billed from: Mexico
- Debut: June 23, 2005
- Disbanded: 2019
- Years active: 2005–2006; 2008–2012; 2016–2019

The Mexicools were a professional wrestling stable and tag team, who were signed to World Wrestling Entertainment's SmackDown! brand. The team consisted of three well-known Mexican wrestlers of the late 1990s: Super Crazy, Psicosis and Juventud. The stable became a tag team when their unofficial leader Juventud was released from WWE on January 6, 2006. The team's gimmick was that of a group of Mexican wrestlers who were fed up with the stereotypical portrayals of Mexicans in the United States as laborers for the "gringos." They frequently parodied this view of Mexicans with their interviews and skits. Following their release from WWE, the group has reformed on the independent circuit in various promotions.

== History ==
=== World Wrestling Entertainment (2005–2006) ===
The Mexicools made their debut as villains on June 23, 2005, when all three members rode to the ring on a John Deere lawn mower, with the sticker saying the more Hispanic-sounding name Juan Deere, and wearing matching coveralls. They attacked both Chavo Guerrero and Paul London during a WWE Cruiserweight Championship match.

Juventud cut a promo questioning the lack of "true Mexican Luchadores" in WWE's cruiserweight division, before going on to deride the current state of Mexican Americans in general. Psicosis dubbed the lawnmower they arrived on a "Mexican Limo 2005" and the group claimed that even Mexico's President mocks Mexicans in the United States (referring to Vicente Fox's controversial remark that Mexican immigrants do the jobs "not even the blacks want to do"). Juventud then stated that they were "no longer there to clean toilets and work for "them" (the "gringos") but "they" were going to be working for "us" (The Mexicools)", before dubbing the team "not Mexicans but Mexicools!" In the following weeks, they would continue to interfere in matches and mock the stereotypical image of Mexicans in the United States, even coming to the ring each with their own riding lawnmower.

They had their debut match on the July 14 episode of SmackDown!, a victory over Paul London, Funaki and Scotty 2 Hotty. They made their pay-per-view debut at The Great American Bash, defeating the reunited Blue World Order. In the following weeks, they would interfere in matches involving William Regal and in Christian's "Peep Show" interview segment.

The Mexicools next feuded with the heel Full Blooded Italians on Velocity, and this saw the group turn into fan favorites. Juventud won a Cruiserweight Battle Royal that included all three Mexicools, thus earning a match for the Cruiserweight Championship at No Mercy. Juventud would win the match against Nunzio at No Mercy and the title.

The Mexicools would then turn their attention to winning the WWE Tag Team Championship. Juventud lost the Cruiserweight Championship back to Nunzio at a house show in Italy. That week, on the SmackDown! Tribute Show to Eddie Guerrero all three Mexicools participated in an interpromotional battle royal, which Juventud won. On the November 25 SmackDown!, Juventud defeated Nunzio to become the Cruiserweight Champion once more. On the December 2 SmackDown!, Psicosis and Super Crazy won a number one contenders battle royal to face the WWE Tag Team Champions MNM at Armageddon. This became just a regular tag team match after MNM lost the WWE Tag Team Championship on the last SmackDown! before Armageddon to Rey Mysterio and Batista. At Armageddon Juventud lost the Cruiserweight Championship to Kid Kash, and MNM defeated Super Crazy and Psicosis with help from Melina.

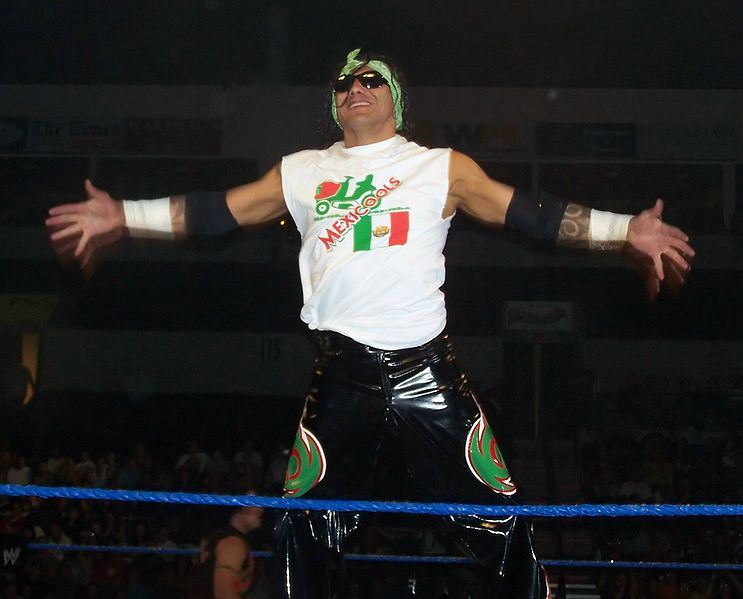
Psicosis, one of the three members of The Mexicools

After repeated backstage problems, Juventud was released from WWE on January 6, 2006, leaving Psicosis and Super Crazy as the only remaining team members. On February 3, 2006, Super Crazy and Psicosis bounced back by nearly defeating MNM for the WWE Tag Team Championship. They appeared to have the gold in the grasp, but their dreams of winning the titles went up in smoke when Melina hit Super Crazy with her boot as he went for a moonsault. MNM capitalized and retained.

Following Juventud's departure from WWE, Psicosis and Super Crazy slowly started to diminish as a tag team. Super Crazy would see success as a singles superstar, winning most of his major matches, including a triple threat number one contender match for the Cruiserweight Championship against Nunzio and Kid Kash. Psicosis failed to appear on WWE television for several weeks. Following Super Crazy's loss to Gregory Helms for the title at Judgment Day, he and Psicosis reunited.

==== Split (2006) ====
Seeds of a split seemed to appear in mid-2006 around the same time as the redevelopment of the ECW brand. During a tag-team match on Velocity the Mexicools faced the reigning WWE Tag Team Champions Paul London and Brian Kendrick. Although both teams respected each other during the match, Psicosis used the ropes to pick up an illegal pinfall to win the match. This led to Super Crazy questioning Psicosis' actions. Next, during a SmackDown! broadcast, Psicosis left Super Crazy to be attacked by The Great Khali after a match, saving his own skin and leaving his tag team partner to fend for himself. Psicosis would later abandon Super Crazy during a handicap match against Khali. On the June 23 edition of SmackDown!, Super Crazy and Psicosis got into a fist-fight after various miscommunications throughout the match, marking the split of the team. The two were still billed as members of the faction in the following weeks, even though they were interfering in each other's matches, until they had a match on an episode of SmackDown! which was won by Super Crazy. After the split, Super Crazy was moved to the Raw brand, while Psicosis stayed on SmackDown!. On November 1, 2006, Psicosis' WWE contract was officially terminated by WWE because of his arrest in Mexico for stealing a car.

=== Independent circuit (2008–2019) ===
The group has regularly teamed together on the independent circuit in Mexico and the United States following their WWE stint.

== Championships and accomplishments ==
- World Wrestling Entertainment
  - WWE Cruiserweight Championship (2 times) – Juventud

== See also ==
- The Filthy Animals
- The Latino World Order
