= Juventud Guerrera =

Mexican professional wrestler (born 1974)

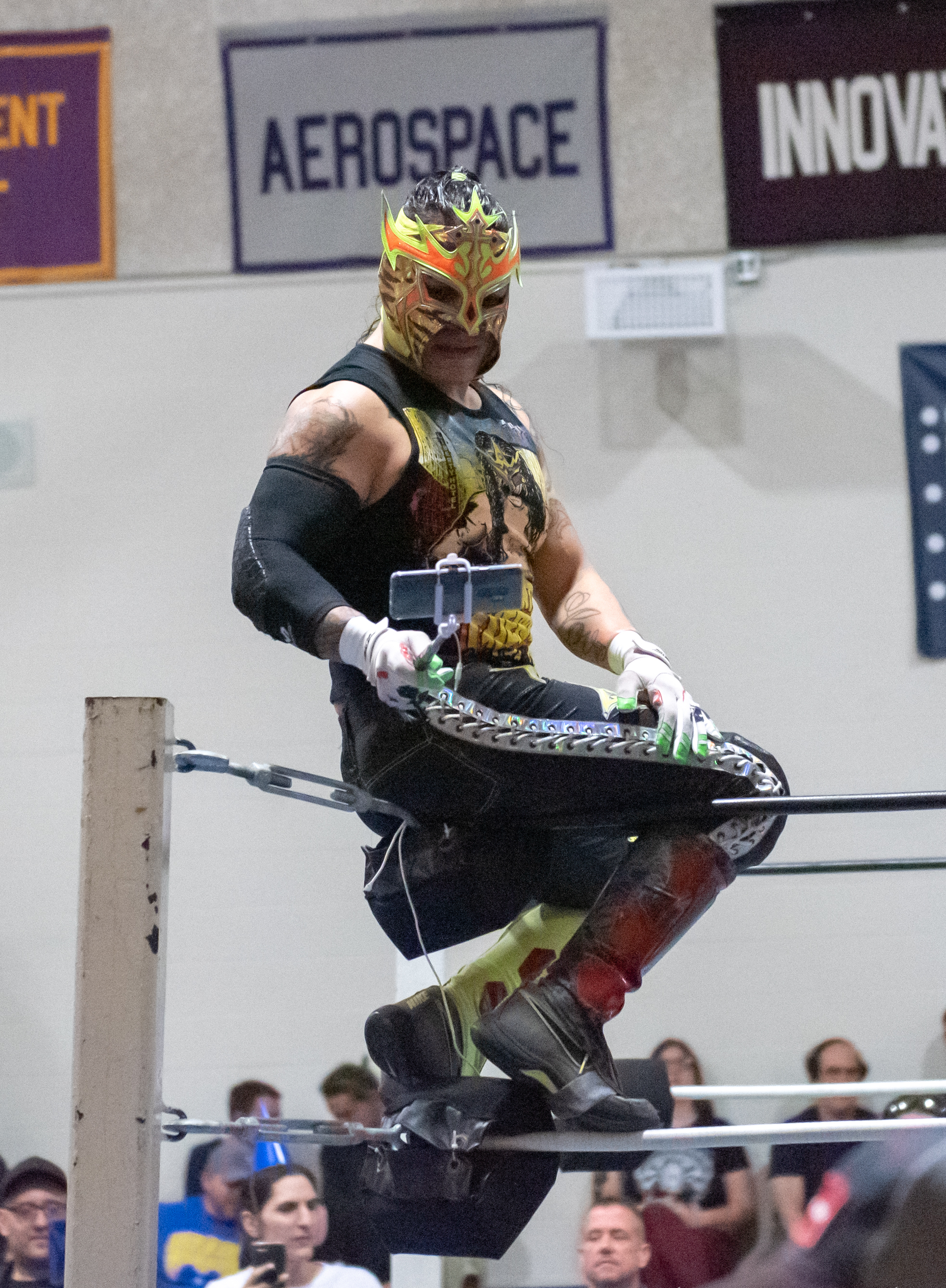
- Guerrera in 2019

Personal information
- Born: Eduardo Aníbal González Hernández; November 23, 1974 (age 51) Mexico City, Mexico

Professional wrestling career
- Ring name(s): Fighting Youth; Fuerza Gimm; El Hijo de Fuerza Guerrera; The Juice; Juventud; Juventud Guerrera
- Billed height: 165 cm (5 ft 5 in)
- Billed weight: 75 kg (165 lb)
- Billed from: Mexico City, Mexico
- Trained by: Fuerza Guerrera; Pepe Casas; Cacique Mara
- Debut: 1992

Eduardo Aníbal González Hernández (born November 23, 1974), better known by his ring name Juventud "Juvi" Guerrera, is a Mexican professional wrestler, he currently performs on the independent circuit.

Guerrera is best known for his appearances with the Mexican promotions Lucha Libre AAA Worldwide (AAA) and Consejo Mundial de Lucha Libre (CMLL) and with the American promotions Extreme Championship Wrestling (ECW), World Wrestling Entertainment (WWE), World Championship Wrestling (WCW), and Total Nonstop Action Wrestling (TNA). Championships held by Guerrera over the course of his career include the AAA Cruiserweight Championship, IWGP Junior Heavyweight Championship, WCW/WWE Cruiserweight Championship, WCW World Tag Team Championship, and WWA International Cruiserweight Championship.

His ring name, "Juventud Guerrera", is Spanish for "Youth Warrior"/"Warrior Youth".

== Professional wrestling career ==
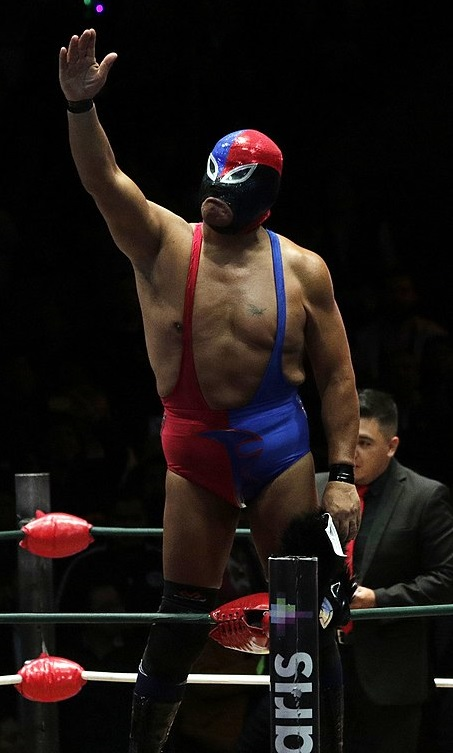
Juventud Guerrera's father, Fuerza Guerrera, prior to a match in November 2018

=== Early career (1992–1996) ===
Early in his career, Guerrera was a mainstay in the Asistencia Asesoría y Administración (AAA) promotion. He had a very lengthy feud with Rey Mysterio Jr. in which they traded the AAA Welterweight Title back and forth. The pair also had several tag team matches in which Guerrera would team with his father Fuerza, while Rey Jr. would tag with uncle and trainer Rey Misterio Sr.

=== Extreme Championship Wrestling (1996) ===
Guerrera first gained American exposure in Extreme Championship Wrestling alongside fellow luchadores Rey Misterio Jr., Psicosis, Konnan and La Parka, all of whom were also wrestling for Konnan's Promo Azteca in Mexico at the time. He debuted in ECW at Big Apple Blizzard Blast in February 1996. When Konnan left for WCW later that year, Guerrera and the rest followed.

=== World Championship Wrestling (1996-2000) ===
==== Early years (1996–1997) ====
In WCW, Guererra made his debut on August 26, 1996, edition of Monday Nitro in a victory over Billy Kidman. He would compete throughout 1996 and 1997 under a mask, like the one he wore in Mexico and ECW.

==== Cruiserweight Champion (1998) ====
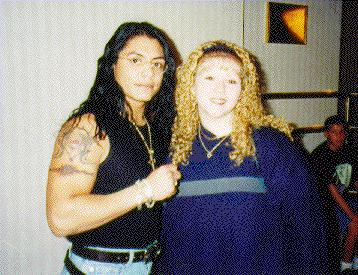
Guerrera with a fan in 1998

Beginning in 1998, Guerrera pinned Último Dragón to win the Cruiserweight Championship on the inaugural edition of Thunder on January 8, 1998. However, he would then lose the title to Rey Misterio Jr. one week later on the following edition of Thunder. At SuperBrawl VIII, Guerrera challenged Chris Jericho for the title in a mask vs. title match, in which Guerrera lost forcing him to unmask. After unmasking Guerrera, Jericho would often berate Guerrera for his looks by referring to him as "Quasi-juice" which was in reference to "Quasimodo", the disfigured lead character in The Hunchback of Notre-Dame. Later in the year, Guerrera defeated Jericho at Road Wild to capture his second Cruiserweight Championship. He retained the belt at Fall Brawl against Silver King, before losing to Billy Kidman the following night on Nitro.

==== Filthy Animals (1999–2000) ====
Later on, Guerrera became an announcer on Thunder in order to remain on-screen while rehabilitating an injury. On November 29, 1999, Guerrera defeated Jushin Thunder Liger to win the IWGP Junior Heavyweight Championship on Nitro. The next week, he would lose the title back to Liger, as Psicosis substituted for Guerrera due to injury (in reality, Guerrera and Jerry Flynn were arrested for DUI, thus no-showed). After his injury healed, he joined former rival Rey Mysterio Jr., Konnan, Billy Kidman, and others to form The Filthy Animals. During the group's run, Guerrera and Mysterio Jr. became the World Tag Team Champions.

In March 2000, during a Thunder taping in Fairfax, Virginia, he and Psychosis ran over Brad Armstrong backstage, severely injuring Armstrong's knee. Psychosis was immediately released after Uncensored, while Guerrera was spared.

Guerrera appeared as himself in the 2000 film Ready to Rumble.

In October 2000, during a WCW tour of Australia, Guerrera was arrested at the hotel in which the wrestlers were staying, after an incident in which he was discovered naked and screaming in a hallway, and then attacking police officers who had arrived to detain him. According to the 2004 book The Death of WCW, Guerrera was reportedly under the influence of PCP at the time. Guerrera was expelled from the remainder of the tour and later released by WCW, and was ordered to pay nearly $1,800 in fines. WCW closed down 5 months later after the final episode of Monday Nitro on March 26, 2001.

=== International appearances and Total Nonstop Action Wrestling (2000–2005) ===
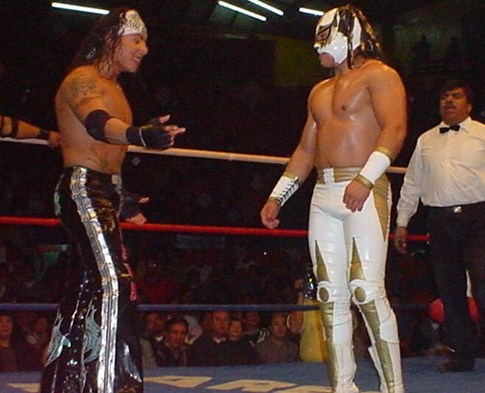
Juventud Guerrera next to Volador Jr. while working for CMLL

After being released from WCW, Guerrera went on to wrestle for many other promotions including AAA, Consejo Mundial de Lucha Libre, World Wrestling All-Stars, Frontier Wrestling Alliance, and Xtreme Pro Wrestling (XPW). He also made a brief appearance in Pro Wrestling Noah as one of 12 participants in a championship tournament to crown the first GHC Junior Heavyweight Champion and lost to Yoshinobu Kanemaru at the tournament finals in Nagoya on June 24, 2001. While in CMLL, he frequently re-teamed with fellow WCW alumnus Rey Mysterio, who had left WCW due to its purchase by the World Wrestling Federation, in CMLL before Mysterio's signing with WWE. After Mysterio signed with WWE in 2002, Guerrera joined the upstart promotion Total Nonstop Action Wrestling.

In TNA, Guerrera was joined by fellow AAA wrestlers Mr. Águila, Héctor Garza, Abismo Negro, Heavy Metal to form a group first known as Team AAA, then later renamed to Team Mexico to compete in TNA's World X Cup Matches. Guerrera would also take part in the 2003 Super X Cup, where he advanced all the way to the finals before being ultimately defeated by Chris Sabin. When TNA's working relationship with AAA came to an end, Team Mexico disbanded and Guererra was released from TNA to continue working for Lucha Libre promotions.

=== World Wrestling Entertainment (2005–2006) ===
In the spring of 2005, Guerrera signed with World Wrestling Entertainment (WWE), He debuted on television, entertaining the WWE Universe simply as Juventud, on June 18, 2005, defeating Funaki on SmackDown!'s sister show Velocity. On the June 23 episode of SmackDown, Juventud, Super Crazy and Psicosis (collectively called "The Mexicools") interrupted a match between Chavo Guerrero and Paul London by riding to the ring on a lawn mower and attacking both wrestlers. The following week by week of The Mexicools interrupting matches and beating down seemingly random WWE Superstars and cutting promos. Juventud quickly established himself as the mouthpiece/leader of the group and began using his old nickname "The Juice".

At the Great American Bash on July 24, The Mexicools defeated the newly reunited Blue World Order (Big Stevie Cool, Da Blue Guy, and Hollywood Nova) in a six-man tag team match. After more weeks of interruptions and sneak attacks, The Mexicools were sent down to Velocity. The group feuded with Velocity main-stay and then-Cruiserweight Champion Nunzio and his tag partner Vito. Each member of The Mexicools picked up numerous pinfall victories over the champion during this time.

At the October 4 SmackDown! tapings for Velocity, Juventud (along with Super Crazy and Psicosis) faced Brian Kendrick, Paul London, Scotty 2 Hotty, and Funaki in an over-the-top battle royal with the stipulation that the winner would receive a title shot at the Cruiserweight Championship at No Mercy. After finally eliminating London, Juventud won the battle royal and the title shot. At the event on October 9, he defeated Nunzio following a Juvi Driver to capture the Cruiserweight Championship, his first title in WWE and, due to the title being originally from WCW, his fourth Cruiserweight Title reign. Juventud later went on to lose the title back to Nunzio at a live event in Italy. On November 25, Juventud regained the title on an edition of SmackDown! from England. Guerrera lost the Cruiserweight title to Kid Kash at Armageddon on December 18, 2005.

On January 6, 2006, WWE announced that Guerrera was released from the company due to multiple backstage issues. His final match aired that evening on SmackDown!, a Cruiserweight Championship rematch against Kid Kash which Juventud lost. During this match, Juventud would use many high flying moves including a 450° splash, a move WWE outright banned due to an earlier match Juventud had with Paul London where he botched the move, and resulting in London suffering several fractured bones in his face.

=== Lucha Libre AAA Worldwide (2006–2008, 2009) ===
Three months later after being released from WWE, Guerrera returned to Mexico to compete with Lucha Libre AAA Worldwide (AAA). Guerrera returned to the promotion on April 30 and formed a new stable known as the "Mexican Powers" alongside Psicosis II, Extreme Tiger, Joe Líder and Crazy Boy, although Psicosis II and Extreme Tiger would later leave the group. During a TNA vs. AAA Mexico show, Juventud was one of the Mexican wrestlers who aided The Latin American Xchange and attacked A.J. Styles. This footage was later shown on the October 5, 2006, episode of TNA Impact!.

In August 2008, Juventud held a press conference to announce his departure from AAA to compete on the Mexican independent circuit. In September, he formed The Sexicools, a parody of his Mexicools group, with Intocable and Toscano. Despite rumors, Guererra did not jump to AAA's rival CMLL.

On March 15, 2009, Guerrera made a surprise return to AAA at the annual Rey de Reyes event. Juventud helped Charly Manson and D-Generation-Mex win their match and joined D-Generation-Mex. Shortly after his return to the company, Guerrera suffered bruising and a broken nose in a backstage fight with Konnan and Jack Evans. The fight started after Guerrera accused Konnan of defecating in his bag, which Konnan denied, and then Evans, with whom Guerrera had had a match that evening, allegedly grabbed Guerrera from behind, provoking the fight.

=== Independent circuit (2008–present) ===
Since the incident in AAA, Guerrera has wrestled for Nu-Wrestling Evolution where he won their cruiserweight championship in a triple threat match involving PAC and Matt Cross. He has since defended it in many triple threat matches usually with PAC and Súper Nova and a few single matches with Súper Nova (all of which he has won so far). Juventud Guerrera lost the title on February 6, 2013, in Milan, being defeated by Giuseppe "King" Danza in 50 seconds.

In 2010s, he stole Jason Style's belt claiming the promoter owes him money.

In 2010, he made a special surprise appearance at Dragon Gate teaming with Dragon Kid in a match against BxB Hulk and Masato Yoshino. Juventud ended up losing the match for his team when he tapped out to Masato Yoshino. On May 20, 2011, he made a surprise appearance at Xtreme Italian Wrestling in a match against Thunder Storm and win the XIW Italian Championship. On September 6, 2014, Juventud made his in-ring debut for Pure Action Championship Wrestling, winning the promotion's Cruiserweight Championship at their final show, Brawl In The Falls III.

On October 12, 2016, Juventud made his debut for Lucha Ilimitado at a show in Yakima, Washington. He teamed with Psicosis in a losing effort against Hijo del Santo & El Santo Jr. Later that night, Juventud & Psicosis attacked Rey Mysterio Jr. and Jeff Hardy (who had just finished a match against one another).

On April 23, 2017, at WCPW Pro Wrestling World Cup – Mexican Qualifying Round Guerrera defeated El Hijo de Dos Caras in the semi-finals, Guerrera was defeated in the finals by Rey Mysterio.

=== Return to AAA (2012–2014, 2018) ===
On February 23, 2012, Guerrera returned to AAA, and losing to his old rival El Hijo del Perro Aguyao in a four-way match, which also included Cibernético and Máscara Año 2000 Jr. On March 18 at Rey de Reyes, Guerrera and Joe Líder, reforming the Mexican Powers, defeated the teams of Extreme Tiger and Fénix, Halloween and Nicho el Millonario, and Chessman and Teddy Hart in a four-way tag team match. As a result, Guerrera and Líder were granted a shot at the AAA World Tag Team Championship, but were defeated on May 6 by the defending champions, Abyss and Chessman. On May 19 at Noche de Campeones, Guerrera defeated Jack Evans, Psicosis and Teddy Hart in a four-way hardcore match to win the AAA Cruiserweight Championship. On August 5 at Triplemanía XX, Guerrera teamed with Chessman for one night to take part in a Parejas Suicidas steel cage match. However, both Guerrera and Chessman managed to escape the cage and avoid having to face each other in a Hair vs. Hair match. On December 2 at Guerra de Titanes, Guerrera lost the AAA Cruiserweight Championship to Daga in a six-way ladder match. Guerrera returned to AAA on August 30, 2013, joining the recently reformed Mexican Powers stable. He, however, ended up turning on the stable on October 18 at Héroes Inmortales VII, costing Crazy Boy and Joe Líder the AAA World Tag Team Championship. He then formed a new rudo stable named Anarquía with Eterno and Steve Pain. Guerrera was seemingly written out of AAA on April 19, 2014, when Daga took over the leadership of Anarquía.

On April 20, 2018, Juventud made his comeback with Kevin Kross and Teddy Hart, directly attacking Dr. Wagner Jr. and Hernandez after the main event for the AAA Mega Championship. The trio called themselves MAD.

=== All Elite Wrestling (2021) ===
On July 28, 2021, Guerrera was announced for a match against his former WCW rival Chris Jericho at All Elite Wrestling's "Homecoming" on August 4, 2021, event in which the latter is required to perform a finishing maneuver from the top rope. This marked his first appearance on TNT since October 2000. The match is the third of the "Five Labors" Jericho must successfully complete in order to face MJF in a grudge match. Juventud lost to Jericho and was attacked by MJF's bodyguard Wardlow after the match. Despite having lost his mask to Jericho many decades earlier in WCW, Guerrera wore a traditional lucha libre mask during the match.

=== Impact Wrestling return (2023) ===
Guerrera made a surprise return to Impact Wrestling. He was a challenger that joined the battle Royal match at Bound for Glory PPV, on October 21, 2023.

== Personal life ==
González Hernández is divorced and has a son. González is the son of Fuerza Guerrera.

== Championships and accomplishments ==
- AAA
  - AAA World Cruiserweight Championship (1 time)
  - Mexican National Atómicos Championship (1 time) – with Crazy Boy, Joe Líder and Psicosis II
  - Mexican National Tag Team Championship (2 times) – with Fuerza Guerrera
- Battle Championship Wrestling
  - BCW Battle Express Championship (1 time)
- Big Time Wrestling
  - BTW United States Light Heavyweight Championship (1 time)
- Canadian Wrestling's Elite
  - Canadian Unified Junior Heavyweight Championship (1 time)
- Fighting Spirit Wrestling
  - FSW Primero Championship (1 time)
- International Wrestling All-Stars
  - IWAS Tag Team Championship (1 time) – with Jerry Estrada
- International Wrestling Association
  - IWA World Junior Heavyweight Championship (1 time)
- Insane Championship Wrestling
  - ICW Heavyweight Championship (1 time)
- Ironfist Wrestling
  - Ironfist Wrestling Flyweight Championship (1 time)
- Nu-Wrestling Evolution
  - NWE Cruiserweight Championship (1 time)
- Kross Fire Wrestling
  - NWA Kross Fire Championship (1 time)
- Pro Wrestling Illustrated
  - PWI ranked him #140 of the 500 best singles wrestlers during the PWI Years in 2003
  - PWI ranked him #25 of the 500 best singles wrestlers of the PWI 500 in 1998
- Pro Wrestling Revolution
  - PWR Junior Heavyweight Championship (1 time)
- Pure Action Championship Wrestling
  - PACW Cruiserweight Championship (1 time)
- Intense Championship Wrestling
  - ICW World Heavyweight Championship (1 time)
- Total Nonstop Action Wrestling
  - America's X Cup (2004) – with Mr. Águila, Abismo Negro, Héctor Garza and Heavy Metal
- World Championship Wrestling
  - IWGP Junior Heavyweight Championship (1 time)
  - WCW Cruiserweight Championship (3 times)
  - WCW World Tag Team Championship (1 time) – with Rey Misterio Jr.
- World Wrestling All-Stars
  - WWA International Cruiserweight Championship (2 times)
- World Wrestling Association
  - WWA Lightweight Championship (2 times)
  - WWA Welterweight Championship (1 time)
  - WWA Tag Team Championship (1 time) – with Fuerza Guerrera
  - WWA Trios Championship (1 time) – with Fuerza Guerrera and Psicosis
- World Wrestling Council
  - WWC World Junior Heavyweight Championship (1 time)
- World Wrestling Entertainment
  - WWE Cruiserweight Championship (2 times)
- Wrestling Observer Newsletter awards
  - Best Flying Wrestler (1998, 1999)
- Xcitement Wrestling Federation
  - XWF World Cruiserweight Championship (1 time)
- Xtreme Latin American Wrestling
  - XLAW Extreme Junior Heavyweight Championship (1 time)
- Xtreme Italian Wrestling
  - XIW Italian Championship (1 time)

== Luchas de Apuestas record ==
Winner (wager)	Loser (wager)	Location	Event	Date	Notes
Juventud Guerrera (mask)	Piloto Suicida (mask)	Monterrey, Nuevo León	Live event	August 12, 1996	
Juventud Guerrera (mask)	Salsero (mask)	Ciudad Juárez, Chihuahua	Live event	October 20, 1997	
Chris Jericho (championship)	Juventud Guerrera (mask)	San Francisco, California	WCW SuperBrawl VIII	February 22, 1998	
Juventud Guerrera (hair)	Dr. Cerebro (hair)	Naucalpan, State of Mexico	Live event	July 2, 2009	

== See also ==
- The Filthy Animals
- Latino World Order
- The Mexicools
- Team Mexico
