= Survivor Series (2005) =

World Wrestling Entertainment pay-per-view event

- Promotional poster featuring The Undertaker
- Promotion: World Wrestling Entertainment
- Brand(s): Raw; SmackDown!
- Date: November 27, 2005
- City: Detroit, Michigan
- Venue: Joe Louis Arena
- Attendance: 15,000
- Buy rate: 400,000
- Tagline: The Beginning of the End

Pay-per-view chronology
← Previous; Taboo Tuesday	Next → Armageddon

Survivor Series chronology
← Previous; 2004	Next → 2006

The 2005 Survivor Series was a professional wrestling pay-per-view (PPV) event produced by World Wrestling Entertainment (WWE). It was the 19th annual Survivor Series and took place on November 27, 2005, at the Joe Louis Arena in Detroit, Michigan, held for wrestlers from the promotion's Raw and SmackDown! brand divisions. This was the third Survivor Series to take place at the Joe Louis Arena, after the 1991 and 1999 events. The event centered on the Survivor Series match, a tag team elimination match that pits teams of multiple wrestlers against each other.

Six matches were contested at the event. Only one Survivor Series match was held, which was the main event and was an interpromotional match in which Team SmackDown! (Batista, Rey Mysterio, John "Bradshaw" Layfield (JBL), Bobby Lashley, and Randy Orton) defeated Team Raw (Shawn Michaels, Kane, The Big Show, Carlito, and Chris Masters) after Orton last eliminated Michaels. In another highly promoted match, which was the main match from Raw, WWE Champion John Cena defeated Kurt Angle to retain his title. In another match from Raw, Triple H defeated Ric Flair in a Last Man Standing match.

== Production ==
=== Background ===
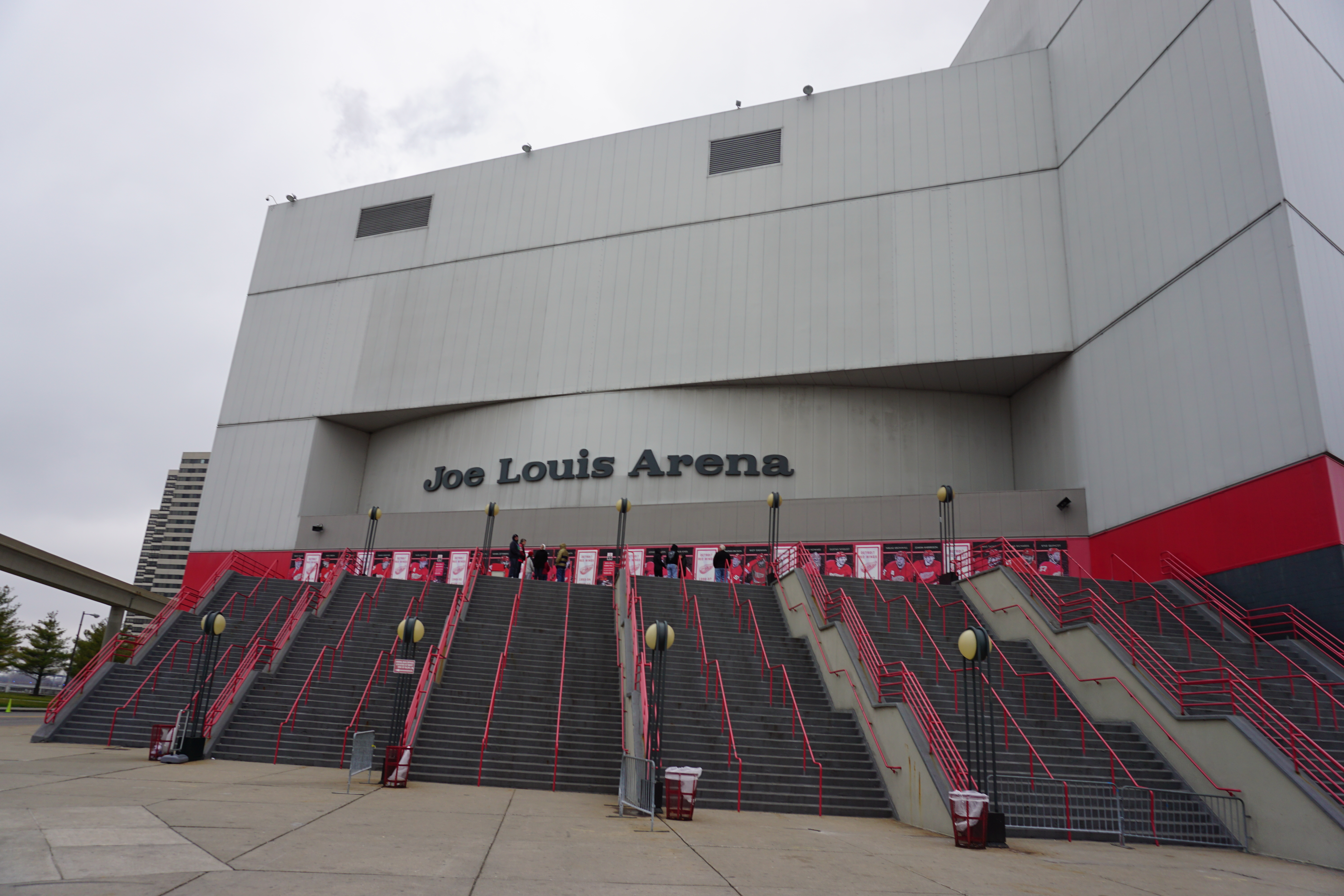
The 19th annual Survivor Series was the third to be held at the Joe Louis Arena in Detroit, Michigan, after the 1991 and 1999 events.

Survivor Series is an annual professional wrestling pay-per-view (PPV) event, produced every November by World Wrestling Entertainment (WWE) since 1987, generally held around Thanksgiving in the United States. In what has become the second longest-running pay-per-view event in history (behind WWE's WrestleMania), it is one of the promotion's original four pay-per-views, along with WrestleMania, SummerSlam, and Royal Rumble, referred to as the "Big Four". The event is traditionally characterized by having Survivor Series matches, which are tag team elimination matches that typically pits teams of four or five wrestlers against each other. The 19th Survivor Series event was scheduled to be held on November 27, 2005, at the Joe Louis Arena in Detroit, Michigan and featured wrestlers from the Raw and SmackDown! brands. This marked the third Survivor Series to be held at the Joe Louis Arena, after the 1991 and 1999 events.

=== Storylines ===
The event's card consisted of six professional wrestling matches involving wrestlers from the Raw and SmackDown! brands, while storylines played out on their weekly television shows, Raw and SmackDown!.

The main leading rivalry leading into the event was between the Raw and SmackDown! brands as a whole, rather than individual wrestlers. The rivalry began on WWE Homecoming, a special episode of Raw on October 3 when Raw's general manager Eric Bischoff stopped a match involving SmackDown! wrestlers by turning the lights out. In return, Bischoff's SmackDown! counterpart, Theodore Long, interrupted a Raw match. As a result, wrestlers from the two brands started a brawl and interfered in the other's show before facing each other in a tag team match at Taboo Tuesday; SmackDown!'s Rey Mysterio and Matt Hardy defeated Raw's Chris Masters and Gene Snitsky. After Taboo Tuesday, Bischoff and Long agreed that teams from each brand would face each other in a 5-on-5 Survivor Series match, while the two managers would wrestle in a singles match at Survivor Series. The teams feuded on both shows, and Batista, the captain of the SmackDown! team, suffered an injury after being attacked several times. Qualifying matches for Team SmackDown! were held on the November 11 episode of SmackDown!, with Rey Mysterio defeating Randy Orton, Bobby Lashley defeating Orlando Jordan, Eddie Guerrero defeating Mr. Kennedy, and John "Bradshaw" Layfield (JBL) defeating Chris Benoit. Guerrero was replaced by Orton due to his sudden death on November 13.

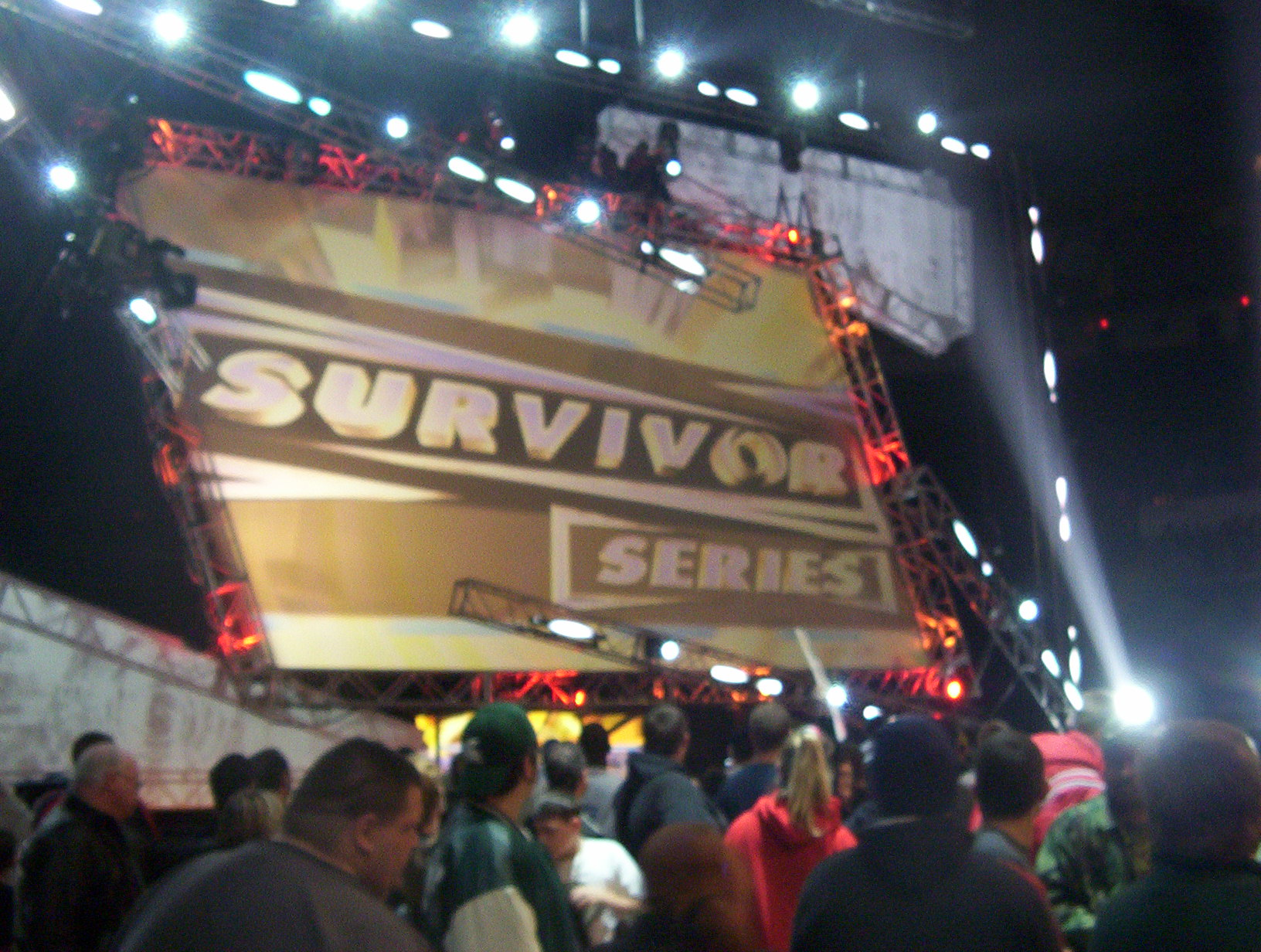
Stage setup for Survivor Series

Another rivalry heading into the event was between John Cena and Kurt Angle, over the WWE Championship. Their feud began in August, when Bischoff chose Angle as the number one contender to the WWE Championship after Cena defeated Chris Jericho in a You're Fired match to retain the WWE Championship, in which Bischoff was forced to fire Jericho, his #1 wrestler. Angle failed to win the title at Unforgiven, due to Cena being disqualified. The two squared off against each other again at Taboo Tuesday in a Triple Threat match that also included Shawn Michaels, and again Cena retained the title. On the November 7 edition of Raw, Angle refused to compete in a tag team match pitting him and Chris Masters against Cena and Michaels due to the "you suck" chants from the audience. Angle finally agreed to compete if Bischoff silenced the crowd and let him have a special guest referee. Angle chose Daivari, who favoured Angle and Masters throughout the match and ultimately disqualified Cena and Michaels for using a chair, which he had ignored earlier when it had been used by Masters.

The rivalry between Triple H and Ric Flair began at WWE Homecoming, when Triple H returned to WWE television after an absence of three months. The two had been aligned since 2002, as members of Evolution, and were partners in a tag team match on the show. After they won the match, Triple H attacked Flair with a sledgehammer. The week after, Triple H explained his actions, saying that he realized Flair was no longer the legend he was, and he needed to stop Flair. Flair and Triple H met in a steel cage match at Taboo Tuesday, which Flair won. A Last Man Standing match was made between the two for Survivor Series.

== Event ==
Other on-screen personnel
Role:	Name:
English commentators	Joey Styles (Raw)
English commentators	Jerry Lawler (Raw)
English commentators	Jonathan Coachman (Raw)
English commentators	Michael Cole (SmackDown)
English commentators	Tazz (SmackDown)
Spanish commentators	Carlos Cabrera
Spanish commentators	Hugo Savinovich
Ring announcers	Lilian Garcia (Raw)
Ring announcers	Tony Chimel (SmackDown)
Referees	Mike Chioda (Raw)
Referees	Jim Korderas (SmackDown)
Referees	Chad Patton (Raw)
Referees	Charles Robinson (SmackDown)
Referees	Jack Doan (Raw)
Referees	Nick Patrick (SmackDown)
Referees	Mickie Henson (Raw)

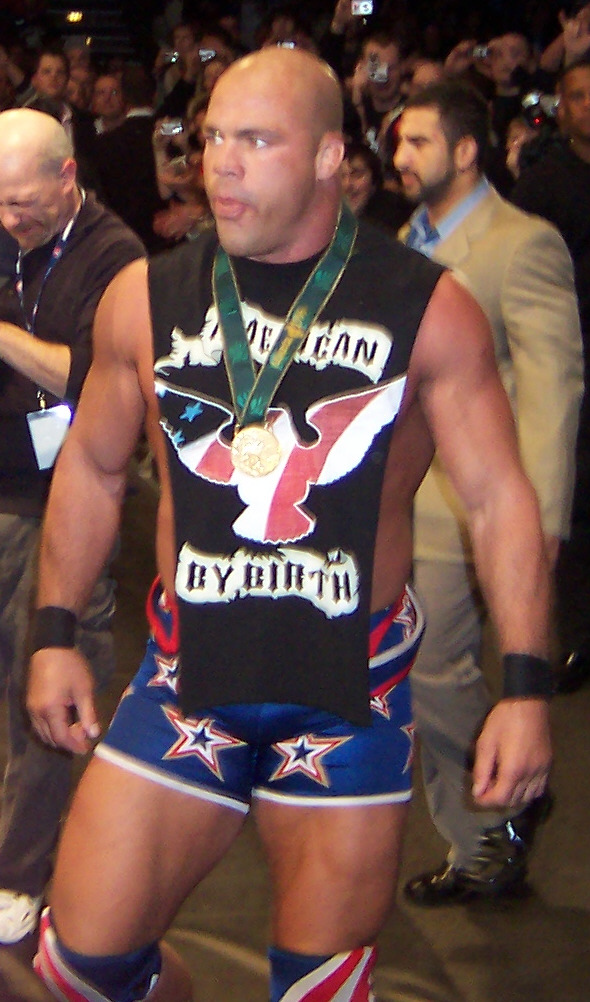
Kurt Angle with Daivari, his special guest referee

Before the event aired live on pay-per-view, a match was contested on Sunday Night Heat between Juventud (accompanied by Super Crazy and Psicosis) and Simon Dean, which Juventud won.

The first pay-per-view match was Booker T (accompanied by Sharmell) against Chris Benoit in the first match of their "Best of 7 series" for the vacant WWE United States Championship. The match started with Booker T exiting the ring when Benoit gained a slight advantage. The match went back and forth for the first half before Booker T took control. The match saw interference by Sharmell, distracting Benoit, who was on the top ropes. After Benoit missed a diving headbutt, Booker T pinned Benoit, using the ropes for leverage, to win the match and take a 1–0 lead in the series.

In the following match, Trish Stratus (accompanied by Mickie James) defended her WWE Women's Championship against Melina (accompanied by Joey Mercury and Johnny Nitro). Stratus immediately took control until Melina fought back. When Nitro and Mercury interfered, the referee ejected them from ringside. Melina kept control until Stratus fought back with forearm shots. Stratus pinned Melina after a diving bulldog to retain the title.

Next, Triple H faced Ric Flair in a Last Man Standing match. Flair was still on his way to the ring, when Triple H attacked him and gained the early advantage. After attacking Flair's head with a screwdriver, Triple H continued using foreign objects throughout the match, including a folding chair, a sledgehammer, and the steel steps. The match went back and forth between Triple H and Flair. Triple H attempted a Pedigree through a broadcast table but Flair countered the move into a back body drop through another broadcast table. Triple H later performed three Pedigrees on Flair but Flair got up each time. Triple H then hit Flair in the back with a sledgehammer, and Flair did not stand by the referee's ten count, giving Triple H the win. After the match, Edge and Lita came to the ring, and Edge announced that he would be hosting a new show on Raw entitled "The Cutting Edge". Edge noted that Dmitri Young was in the audience, and proceeded to criticize the sports teams of Detroit. Young replied by insulting Edge and his lack of a world championship.

In the fourth match, John Cena defended the WWE Championship against Kurt Angle, with Daivari as the special guest referee. Early in the match, Angle was able to apply the ankle lock on Cena. Cena reached the ropes but Daivari kicked his hand off. An angered Cena slapped Daivari, who tried to disqualify him as a result. Angle, however, stopped him, and both men were knocked out of the ring by Cena. As Daivari was knocked down outside, a Raw referee came out to officiate. After Cena gained the advantage, Angle knocked down the referee, and executed an illegal low blow. Angle called for another referee, but failed to get the win after executing an Angle Slam and a superplex. After Angle missed a moonsault, Cena went for an FU but Angle countered by holding onto the referee, which led to Angle knocking down the referee. As the other referee was knocked out, SmackDown! referee Charles Robinson came out. Cena then delivered a DDT to Daivari and executed an FU on Angle, pinning him to retain the championship.

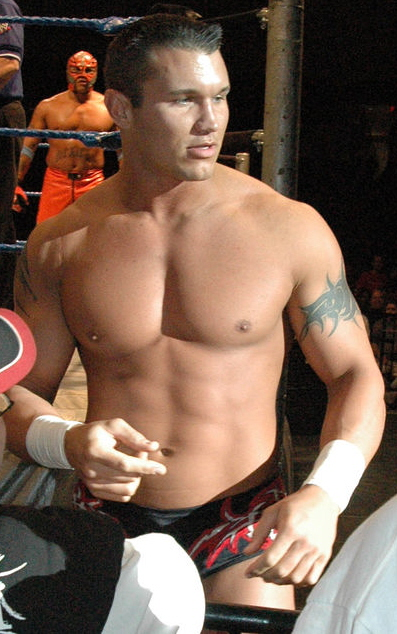
Randy Orton replaced Eddie Guerrero in the Survivor Series match

In the fifth match, Raw General Manager Eric Bischoff faced SmackDown! General Manager Theodore Long (with Palmer Canon). Two referees from each show officiated the match. Long began by avoiding Bischoff's attacks. As Canon climbed on the apron, and distracted the referees, Bischoff used his obi to choke Long. Bischoff continued choking Long and applied the sleeper hold. Cannon distracted the referees again as Long hit Bischoff with his shoe. The Boogeyman's music played with Bischoff sending the referees up the ramp to stop him. The Boogeyman delivered a pumphandle slam to Bischoff and Long pinned Bischoff to win the match.

In the main event, Team SmackDown! (Batista, Rey Mysterio, John "Bradshaw" Layfield, Bobby Lashley, and Randy Orton) faced Team Raw (Shawn Michaels, Kane, Big Show, Carlito, and Chris Masters) in the 5-on-5 Traditional Survivor Series Elimination Match. Michaels eliminated Lashley after a chokeslam from Kane. Batista then eliminated Kane after a 619 from Mysterio and a spinebuster from Batista. Big Show eliminated Batista after a double chokeslam by Big Show and Kane. Mysterio eliminated Big Show after a Clothesline From Hell by JBL, a 619 from Mysterio, an RKO by Orton, another Clothesline from Hell by JBL and a seated senton by Mysterio. JBL eliminated Carlito after a Clothesline From Hell. Mysterio eliminated Masters after 619 and Droppin' Da Dime. Michaels eliminated both Mysterio and JBL after Sweet Chin Music. JBL distracted Michaels, which made Michaels execute Sweet Chin Music on JBL. As Michaels turned around, Orton executed an RKO on Michaels and to eliminate him, leaving Orton as the sole survivor for a third straight year. After the match, SmackDown! wrestlers came to the ring to celebrate with Orton when hooded figures carrying a casket came out. Lightning struck the casket and set it on fire; The Undertaker emerged attacking most of the wrestlers while Orton and his father "Cowboy" Bob Orton evaded The Undertaker by leaving the ring.

== Aftermath ==
=== Raw ===
The five-on-five Survivor Series match ended the rivalry between the brands. On December 5, Eric Bischoff was fired as general manager of Raw by Vince McMahon, who took control of the Raw brand as temporary general manager of Raw. McMahon soon started to feud with Shawn Michaels, whom he lauded for his part in the Montreal Screwjob, when Michaels told McMahon to move on. This would lead to a feud with D-Generation X (DX) that lasted most of 2006.

After Survivor Series, John Cena and Kurt Angle continued their feud. Before being fired, Bischoff had proposed that Cena should defend his WWE championship in an Elimination Chamber match at New Year's Revolution. On the December 12 episode of Raw, Kurt Angle, Carlito, Shawn Michaels, Chris Masters, and Kane won matches qualifying them for the Elimination Chamber match. After the qualifying matches, Cena faced Angle's associate, Daivari in a "You Can't See Me" match, as it would see Cena blindfolded during the match. Cena won as he made Daivari submit to the STFU. At New Year's Revolution, Cena also won the Elimination Chamber match, last eliminating Carlito, but afterward, dropped the title to Edge, who cashed in his Money in the Bank contract following the match.

=== SmackDown ===
Randy Orton and The Undertaker fought each other at Armageddon in a Hell in a Cell match, which the Undertaker won, ending their feud. Triple H moved on to feud with Big Show, and Ric Flair feuded with Edge over the WWE Intercontinental Championship. Chris Benoit continued to feud with Booker T throughout the rest of the year and into 2006; their "Best of Seven series" concluded in January. Randy Orton, who was Booker T's replacement due to a kayfabe injury, defeated Benoit in the seventh and final match, giving Booker T the WWE United States Championship. However, Booker T would lose the title to Benoit the following month at No Way Out.

=== Future ===
In May 2006, WWE introduced a third brand dubbed ECW. The brand featured wrestlers from the former Extreme Championship Wrestling (ECW) promotion, as well as new talent.

== Results ==
No.	Results	Stipulations	Times
1^{H}	Juventud (with Psicosis and Super Crazy) defeated Simon Dean by pinfall	Singles match	4:10
2	Booker T (with Sharmell) defeated Chris Benoit by pinfall	Singles match for the vacant WWE United States Championship; First in the best of seven series.	14:39
3	Trish Stratus (c) (with Mickie James) defeated Melina (with Joey Mercury and Johnny Nitro) by pinfall	Singles match for the WWE Women's Championship	6:30
4	Triple H defeated Ric Flair	Last Man Standing match	26:59
5	John Cena (c) defeated Kurt Angle by pinfall	Singles match for the WWE Championship; Daivari served as the special guest referee.	13:56
6	Theodore Long (with Palmer Canon) defeated Eric Bischoff by pinfall	Singles match	5:23
7	Team SmackDown! (Batista, Bobby Lashley, John "Bradshaw" Layfield, Randy Orton, and Rey Mysterio) defeated Team Raw (Big Show, Carlito, Chris Masters, Kane, and Shawn Michaels)	5-on-5 Survivor Series match	24:01
(c) / – the champion(s) heading into the match; H / – the match was broadcast prior to the pay-per-view on Sunday Night Heat

=== Survivor Series match ===
Eliminated	Wrestler	Eliminated by	Team	Method	Time
1	Bobby Lashley	Shawn Michaels	Team SmackDown!	Pinfall	7:17
2	Kane	Batista	Team Raw	Pinfall	11:41
3	Batista	Big Show	Team SmackDown!	Pinfall	12:27
4	Big Show	Rey Mysterio	Team Raw	Pinfall	14:28
5	Carlito	John "Bradshaw" Layfield	Team Raw	Pinfall	17:35
6	Chris Masters	Rey Mysterio	Team Raw	Pinfall	19:12
7	Rey Mysterio	Shawn Michaels	Team SmackDown!	Pinfall	20:30
8	John "Bradshaw" Layfield	Shawn Michaels	Team SmackDown!	Pinfall	20:44
9	Shawn Michaels	Randy Orton	Team Raw	Pinfall	24:01
Sole Survivor:	Randy Orton (Team SmackDown!)				
