= Ed Ferrara =

American professional wrestler and writer (born 1966)

Personal information
- Born: Edward Ferrara; November 22, 1966 (age 59) Bowie, Arizona, U.S.

Professional wrestling career
- Ring name(s): Ed Ferrara; Oklahoma; Bruce Beaudine; The Powers That Be
- Billed height: 5 ft 11 in (180 cm)
- Billed weight: 209 lb (91 kg)
- Debut: 1994

Edward Ferrara (born November 22, 1966) is an American retired professional wrestler, writer and agent for the World Wrestling Federation (WWF, now WWE) and World Championship Wrestling (WCW), often co-working alongside Vince Russo. Russo, however, would dispute Ferrera's status as a WWF employee and stated that during his time working with the WWF, Ferrera was actually employed as a consultant for the USA Network, which Russo also stated "directly oversaw" WWF product. He is most known for, in WCW, portraying the character "Oklahoma", a mockery of WWF's commentator Jim Ross, and was the heaviest WCW Cruiserweight Champion, although he was forced to vacate the title for exceeding the 220 lb weight limit. Ed Ferrara began his work in television production and writing, contributing to shows such as Honey, I Shrunk the Kids: The TV Show and Weird Science on the USA Network. Ferrara was also a wrestler in Slammers Wrestling Federation known as Bruce Beaudine. He was most recently working on the creative team for Total Nonstop Action Wrestling.

== Biography ==
=== Education ===
Ferrara graduated from Drew University in 1989 with a Bachelor of Arts in theater arts and English.

=== Early career (1994-1998) ===
Between 1994 and 1996, Ferrara was trained and wrestled in the California-based independent promotion - Slammers Wrestling Federation. Ferrara worked under the ring name of Bruce Beaudine and on April 11, 1996 he won the SWF heavyweight championship.

=== World Wrestling Federation (1998–1999) ===
In 1998, Ferrara was writing for television shows on the USA Network. Executives at USA learned that he was working as an independent wrestler on the weekends, and set up a meeting with him and the World Wrestling Federation (WWF, later WWE). He matched the credentials required for the job including previous experience in wrestling and working in television production. He secured an interview with Vince McMahon and began working with the WWF at the King of the Ring in 1998 during the Attitude Era. He immediately clicked with his writing partner Vince Russo. According to Russo, Ferrera was actually a consultant for the USA Network and was working with Bonnie Hammer.

Ferrara appeared on an episode of Sunday Night Heat on March 14, 1999 when Tiger Ali Singh called out a fan. The fan was Ferrara which Singh wanted to impersonate Jim Ross. While Ferrara did the impersonation, fans began booing. Ross and "Dr. Death" Steve Williams came out to confront Ferrara. Williams German suplexed Ferrara and then attacked Singh.

Eventually, Ferrara and Russo were offered a better deal to work for WCW, and left the WWF to go work there.

=== World Championship Wrestling (1999–2001) ===
Ferrara and Russo began working for WCW in October 1999, and they placed themselves within the onscreen product of WCW. They migrated their "Crash TV" formula from the WWF. Matches were shorter in length, speaking segments both inside and outside the ring were more prominent, and a far greater emphasis was made on pushing midcard wrestlers to the point that everyone on the card had a gimmick and/or storyline. Successful products of their initial tenure at WCW included Screamin' Norman Smiley, 3 Count, the re-invention of The Outsiders, The Mamalukes, 'Psycho' David Flair, The Revolution, The Filthy Animals, and Chris Benoit's main event push, among others. There were some storylines which did not necessarily go over with fans the way they wished including Buzzkill, The Maestro, Buff Bagwell, and Madusa winning the Cruiserweight title.

Another storyline that didn't go over well with fans was Ferrara's controversial parody of WWF commentator Jim Ross, in which he took the onscreen name of Oklahoma and began parodying Ross on WCW programming, even going as far as to mimick Ross' Bell's Palsy affliction. He had previously done an impersonation of Ross in the WWF during an angle with Tiger Ali Singh where he was called from the audience as a fan and did his Ross impression. Ross would state that his impersonation was "personal" and "very hurtful". Jim Cornette would later spit in his face and challenge him to a fight for making fun of his long-time friend, Jim Ross. He defeated Madusa for the Cruiserweight Title.

Their initial stint was epitomized by the reintroduction of the nWo after months of storylines which ultimately saw Bret Hart win the world title at the expense of his nemesis Goldberg. However, both Hart and Goldberg got injured a few days prior to a major WCW pay-per-view. WCW later formed a booking committee which consisted of former bookers including Kevin Sullivan, Kevin Nash, J. J. Dillon and Bob Mould. This would also mark the beginning of the end for the friendship between Russo and Ferrara who both took opposing positions. Russo refused to work in the booking committee as he felt he was "jobbed out" by the backstage politics of the company whilst Ferrara decided he would stay on as he had just relocated his entire family to Atlanta and so felt compelled to continue his work as a writer. This would be the last time Russo and Ferrara would willingly work with one another in a wrestling environment, until being reunited in TNA years later (see below).

The success of the booking committee was limited at best. Ratings had plummeted and WCW was in a state of disrepair. Russo's and Ferrara's "Crash TV" writing style, which enjoyed immense popularity among the WWF's predominately Northern and Western audiences from urban areas, was openly resented by rural, traditional Southern wrestling fans who made up the majority of WCW's fanbase. The new committee also led to the mass exodus of the most promising mid-card wrestlers in the company. Now known as The Radicalz, Chris Benoit, Dean Malenko, Eddie Guerrero and Perry Saturn all walked out of WCW as Sullivan stated he had no plans to use them on subsequent programming. It was rumored that 17 wrestlers had asked for their release that night but only five of them got their successful release (this included Shane Douglas but he would return in April of that year). Within two months the booking committee was disbanded and in a desperate attempt to salvage their ailing product, WCW hired back Russo and Eric Bischoff to help out. This led to Ed Ferrara getting demoted to a road agent position.

He did voiceovers that played over the intercom when non-English speaking La Parka was doing interviews, often getting La Parka in trouble with his opponents with the comments he created over the intercom.

=== Total Nonstop Action Wrestling (2002, 2009–2010) ===
From June to August 2002, Ferrara did color commentary on the Total Nonstop Action Wrestling weekly pay-per-views alongside Mike Tenay and Don West when the company started. At the time when the company was cutting costs due to lack of financial backing, Ferrara chose to leave after being told that he would not be receiving a paycheck on a regular basis and that he would only be paid when the company was able to make that money back.

Ferrara returned to the TNA creative team as of the September 20, 2009, TNA pay-per-view event No Surrender, being paired with Vince Russo once again. On June 30, 2010, it was reported that Ferrara was no longer working for TNA.

=== Later years (2001-2014) ===
After WCW folded, Ferrara debuted in NWA Wildside and criticized the concept of women participating in wrestling. This began a feud with homosexual wrestler Lazz. A Five Minute Survival Match was booked for the Wildside Anniversary Show that year between the two. If Ferrera survived five minutes with Lazz, he got five minutes with the Wildside creative mind, NWA VP Bill Behrens. Lazz accidentally knocked out referee Jimmy Rivers, allowing Behrens to come out and hit Ferrara with a tennis racket. Lazz then hit his finisher, the Britney Spear, and Behrens entered the ring and physically slammed the unconscious hand of Rivers.

In July 2004, he wrote a book titled Dark Consequences consisting of five horror short stories. In late 2005, a three-disc DVD boxset was released entitled Pro Wrestling's Ultimate Insiders which consists of interviews with him along with co-writer Vince Russo about their time in the World Wrestling Federation and World Championship Wrestling. Ferrara spent most of the subsequent years teaching at Columbia College in Chicago, Illinois.

In 2005, his former writing partner Kevin Murphy named a character after him on the TV series Desperate Housewives.

In July 2013, Ferrara obtained his Masters of Fine Arts degree in creative writing from the University of Southern Maine's Stonecoast program. Ferrara currently resides in Florida where he teaches "Creative Writing for Entertainment" at Full Sail University.

In 2014, Ferrara was a regular host on Major League Wrestling Radio.

== Championships and accomplishments ==
- Slammers Wrestling Federation
  - SWF Heavyweight Championship (1 time)
- World Championship Wrestling
  - WCW Cruiserweight Championship (1 time)
- Pro Wrestling Illustrated
  - PWI ranked him # 445 of the 500 best singles wrestlers in the PWI 500 in 1996.
- Wrestling Observer Newsletter
  - Worst Gimmick (1999) As The Powers That Be
