= List of WWE Cruiserweight Champions (1996–2007) =

Listing of professional wrestling champions for the Cruiserweight Championship

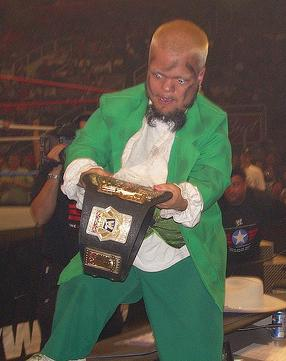
Youngest and final champion Hornswoggle

The WWE Cruiserweight Championship was a professional wrestling championship in World Wrestling Entertainment (WWE) and was originally a World Championship Wrestling (WCW) title. It was challenged by cruiserweights at a maximum weight of 225 lbs. During the WWE brand extension, it was the only title to be exclusive to the SmackDown! brand during its entire tenure. There were a total of 36 recognized champions who had a combined 34 official reigns. This is a chronological list of wrestlers that held the original WWE Cruiserweight Championship, listed by ring name, with the longest reign being 385 days by Gregory Helms (as well as being the only person to hold this championship for 365 days or more), and the most reigns by Rey Mysterio with 8.

After WCW was purchased by WWE, the inaugural champion was retroactively changed from Shinjiro Otani to Brian Pillman, as WWE recognizes the former WCW Light Heavyweight Championship as part of the original lineage of the Cruiserweight Championship.

== Reigns ==
=== Names ===
Name	Years
WCW Cruiserweight Championship	March 20, 1996 – November 18, 2001
WWF Cruiserweight Championship	November 18, 2001 – May 6, 2002
WWE Cruiserweight Championship	May 6, 2002 – September 25, 2007

=== Reigns ===
Key
No.	Overall reign number
Reign	Reign number for the specific champion
Days	Number of days held
Days recog.	Number of days held recognized by the promotion
†	Championship change is unrecognized by the promotion
<1	Reign lasted less than a day

No.	Champion	Championship change			Reign statistics			Notes	Ref.
No.	Champion	Date	Event	Location	Reign	Days	Days recog.	Notes	Ref.
World Championship Wrestling (WCW)
1	Shinjiro Otani	March 20, 1996	Hyper Battle 1996	Nagoya, Japan	1	43	42	Otani defeated Wild Pegasus in tournament final to determine the first WCW Cruiserweight Champion. This was a New Japan Pro-Wrestling event.	
2	Dean Malenko	May 2, 1996	WorldWide	Lake Buena Vista, FL	1	67	66	Aired on May 18 on tape delay.	
3	Rey Mysterio Jr.	July 8, 1996	Monday Nitro	Lake Buena Vista, FL	1	111	110		
4	Dean Malenko	October 27, 1996	Halloween Havoc	Paradise, NV	2	63	62		
5	Último Dragón	December 29, 1996	Starrcade	Nashville, TN	1	23	24	This match was also for Dragon's J-Crown.	
6	Dean Malenko	January 21, 1997	Clash of the Champions XXXIV	Milwaukee, WI	3	33	32		
7	Syxx	February 23, 1997	SuperBrawl VII	Daly City, CA	1	125	124		
8	Chris Jericho	June 28, 1997	Saturday Nitro	Inglewood, CA	1	30	29	Jericho won the match at a house show that was broadcast over the Internet as Saturday Nitro.	
9	Alex Wright	July 28, 1997	Monday Nitro	Charleston, WV	1	15	18	WWE recognizes Wright's reign as ending on August 16, 1997, when the episode aired on tape delay.	
10	Chris Jericho	August 12, 1997	Saturday Night	Colorado Springs, CO	2	29	28	WWE recognizes Jericho's reign as beginning on August 16, 1997, when the episode aired on tape delay.	
11	Eddie Guerrero	September 14, 1997	Fall Brawl	Winston-Salem, NC	1	42	41		
12	Rey Mysterio Jr.	October 26, 1997	Halloween Havoc	Paradise, NV	2	15	14	This was a Mask vs. Title match.	
13	Eddie Guerrero	November 10, 1997	Monday Nitro	Memphis, TN	2	49	48		
14	Último Dragón	December 29, 1997	Monday Nitro	Baltimore, MD	2	10	9		
15	Juventud Guerrera	January 8, 1998	Thunder	Daytona Beach, FL	1	7	6		
16	Rey Mysterio Jr.	January 15, 1998	Thunder	Lakeland, FL	3	9	8		
17	Chris Jericho	January 24, 1998	Souled Out	Dayton, OH	3	113	143		
18	Dean Malenko	May 17, 1998	Slamboree	Worcester, MA	4	25	26	Malenko won a battle royal earlier in the night, wearing a mask as Ciclope, to earn a title shot.	
—	Vacated	June 11, 1998	Thunder	Buffalo, NY	—	—	—	The championship was vacated due to Dean Malenko not earning the title shot as himself.	
19	Chris Jericho	June 14, 1998	The Great American Bash	Baltimore, MD	4	55	55	Jericho defeated Dean Malenko by disqualification. On July 12 at Bash at the Beach, Rey Misterio Jr. defeated Jericho for the title due to interference from Malenko; Jericho was returned the title the following night. WWE recognizes Jericho's reign as lasting 56 days.	
20	Juventud Guerrera	August 8, 1998	Road Wild	Sturgis, SD	2	37	36	Dean Malenko was the special guest referee.	
21	Billy Kidman	September 14, 1998	Monday Nitro	Greenville, SC	1	63	62		
22	Juventud Guerrera	November 16, 1998	Monday Nitro	Wichita, KS	3	6	5		
23	Billy Kidman	November 22, 1998	World War 3	Auburn Hills, MI	2	113	112		
24	Rey Mysterio Jr.	March 15, 1999	Monday Nitro	Cincinnati, OH	4	35	34		
25	Psychosis	April 19, 1999	Monday Nitro	Gainesville, FL	1	7	6	This was a four-way match also involving Blitzkrieg and Juventud Guerrera.	
26	Rey Mysterio Jr.	April 26, 1999	Monday Nitro	Fargo, ND	5	115	114		
27	Lenny Lane	August 19, 1999	Thunder	Lubbock, TX	1	46	45		
—	Vacated	October 4, 1999	—	—	—	—	—	The championship was vacated due to Lenny Lane being stripped of the title after Turner Broadcasting did not approve of the publicity garnered through Lane's homosexual gimmick.	
28	Psychosis	October 4, 1999	Monday Nitro	Kansas City, MO	2	<1	<1	Psychosis was awarded the title after the West Hollywood Blonde's angle was dropped.	
29	Disco Inferno	October 4, 1999	Monday Nitro	Kansas City, MO	1	48	49		
30	Evan Karagias	November 21, 1999	Mayhem	Toronto, ON, Canada	1	28	27		
31	Madusa	December 19, 1999	Starrcade	Washington, D.C.	1	28	27	Became the first female Cruiserweight Champion.	
32	Oklahoma	January 16, 2000	Souled Out	Cincinnati, OH	1	2	1		
—	Vacated	January 18, 2000	Thunder	Evansville, IN	—	—	—	The championship was vacated due to Oklahoma exceeding the weight limit. Aired on January 19 on tape delay.	
33	The Artist	February 20, 2000	SuperBrawl 2000	Daly City, CA	1	39	38	The Artist defeated Lash LeRoux in a tournament final to win the vacant championship.	
34	Billy Kidman	March 30, 2000	House show	Baltimore, MD	3	1	<1		
35	The Artist	March 31, 2000	House show	Pittsburgh, PA	2	10	9		
—	Vacated	April 10, 2000	Monday Nitro	Denver, CO	—	—	—	The championship was vacated by Eric Bischoff and Vince Russo, along with all other WCW titles.	
36	Chris Candido	April 16, 2000	Spring Stampede	Chicago, IL	1	29	28	Candido defeated The Artist, Juventud Guerrera, Shannon Moore, Lash LeRoux and Crowbar in a six-way match to win the vacant championship.	
37	Crowbar and Daffney	May 15, 2000	Monday Nitro	Biloxi, MS	1	7	6	Crowbar and Daffney defeated Chris Candido and Tammy Lynn Sytch in a mixed tag team match to become co-champions.	
38	Daffney	May 22, 2000	Monday Nitro	Grand Rapids, MI	1	15	14	Daffney defeated Crowbar to become undisputed champion and second female to win the title.	
39	Lieutenant Loco	June 6, 2000	Thunder	Knoxville, TN	1	55	54	This was a three-way match also involving Disqo. Aired on June 7 on tape delay.	
40	Lance Storm	July 31, 2000	Monday Nitro	Cincinnati, OH	1	14	13		
41	Elix Skipper	August 14, 2000	Monday Nitro	Kelowna, BC, Canada	1	49	48	Skipper was awarded the title by his Team Canada partner Lance Storm, who called it the "101 KG and Under Championship".	
42	Mike Sanders	October 2, 2000	Monday Nitro	Daly City, CA	1	63	62	Sanders and Kevin Nash defeated Skipper in a Handicap Powerbomb match.	
43	Chavo Guerrero Jr.	December 4, 2000	Thunder	Lincoln, NE	2	104	103	Formerly known as Lieutenant Loco. Aired on December 6 on tape delay.	
44	Shane Helms	March 18, 2001	Greed	Jacksonville, FL	1	107	109	WCW was purchased by the World Wrestling Federation later that month. WWE recognizes Helms' reign as ending on July 5, 2001, when the episode aired on tape delay.	
World Wrestling Federation (WWF)
45	Billy Kidman	July 3, 2001	SmackDown!	Tacoma, WA	4	27	24	This was the first title change in the WWF. WWE recognizes Kidman's reign as beginning on July 5, 2001, when the episode aired on tape delay.	
46	X-Pac	July 30, 2001	Raw is War	Philadelphia, PA	2	71	73	Formerly known as Syxx. X-Pac's WWF Light Heavyweight Championship was also on the line. WWE recognizes X-Pac's reign as ending on October 11, 2001, when the episode aired on tape delay.	
47	Billy Kidman	October 9, 2001	SmackDown!	Moline, IL	5	13	11	WWE recognizes Kidman's reign as beginning on October 11, 2001, when the episode aired on tape delay.	
48	Tajiri	October 22, 2001	Raw	Kansas City, MO	1	162	163	The title became the WWF Cruiserweight Championship when the WWF defeated The Alliance at Survivor Series on November 18 and replaced the WWF Light Heavyweight Championship. The title became exclusive to SmackDown! on March 25, 2002.	
World Wrestling Federation: SmackDown
49	Billy Kidman	April 2, 2002	SmackDown!	Rochester, NY	6	19	16	WWE recognizes Kidman's reign as beginning on April 4, 2002, when the episode aired on tape delay.	
50	Tajiri	April 21, 2002	Backlash	Kansas City, MO	2	23	24	The title became the WWE Cruiserweight Championship on May 5 when the WWF became World Wrestling Entertainment.	
World Wrestling Entertainment (WWE): SmackDown
51	The Hurricane	May 14, 2002	SmackDown!	Montreal, QC, Canada	2	40	38	Formerly known as Shane Helms. This was a triple threat match, also involving Billy Kidman. WWE recognizes his reign as beginning on May 16, 2002, when the episode aired on tape delay.	
52	Jamie Noble	June 23, 2002	King of the Ring	Columbus, OH	1	147	146		
53	Billy Kidman	November 17, 2002	Survivor Series	New York, NY	7	98	97		
54	Matt Hardy	February 23, 2003	No Way Out	Montreal, QC, Canada	1	100	101		
55	Rey Mysterio	June 3, 2003	SmackDown!	Anaheim, CA	6	112	111	Formerly known as Rey Mysterio Jr. Aired on June 5 on tape delay.	
56	Tajiri	September 23, 2003	SmackDown!	Philadelphia, PA	3	98	95	WWE recognizes his reign as beginning on September 25, 2003, when the episode aired on tape delay.	
57	Rey Mysterio	December 30, 2003	SmackDown!	Laredo, TX	7	47	44	WWE recognizes Mysterio's reign as beginning on January 1, 2004, when the episode aired on tape delay.	
58	Chavo Guerrero	February 15, 2004	No Way Out	Daly City, CA	3	79	80	Formerly known as Chavo Guerrero Jr.	
59	Jacqueline	May 4, 2004	SmackDown!	Tucson, AZ	1	12	9	Jacqueline answered an open challenge; became the third female to win the title. WWE recognizes her reign as beginning on May 6, 2004, when the episode aired on tape delay.	
60	Chavo Guerrero	May 16, 2004	Judgment Day	Los Angeles, CA	4	2	3	Guerrero won the championship with one hand tied behind his back, though his father Chavo Classic untied it during the match.	
61	Chavo Classic	May 18, 2004	SmackDown!	Paradise, NV	1	28	27	This was a triple threat match also involving Spike Dudley. Aired on May 20 on tape delay.	
62	Rey Mysterio	June 15, 2004	SmackDown!	Rosemont, IL	8	42	41	Aired on June 17 on tape delay.	
63	Spike Dudley	July 27, 2004	SmackDown!	Cincinnati, OH	1	138	135	WWE recognizes Dudley's reign as beginning on July 29, 2004, when the episode aired on tape delay.	
64	Funaki	December 12, 2004	Armageddon	Duluth, GA	1	70	69		
65	Chavo Guerrero	February 20, 2005	No Way Out	Pittsburgh, PA	5	37	38	This was a six-man Cruiserweight Open, also involving Akio, Spike Dudley, Shannon Moore and Paul London, who Chavo last eliminating.	
66	Paul London	March 29, 2005	SmackDown!	Houston, TX	1	126	127	This was an eight-man battle royal, last eliminating Billy Kidman. Aired on March 31 on tape delay.	
67	Nunzio	August 2, 2005	Velocity	Bridgeport, CT	1	68	64	WWE recognizes Nunzio's reign as beginning on August 6, 2005, when the episode aired on tape delay.	
68	Juventud	October 9, 2005	No Mercy	Houston, TX	4	37	36	Formerly known as Juventud Guerrera.	
69	Nunzio	November 15, 2005	House show	Rome, Italy	2	7	9		
70	Juventud	November 22, 2005	SmackDown!	Sheffield, England	5	26	22	WWE recognizes his reign as beginning on November 25, 2005, when the episode aired on tape delay.	
71	Kid Kash	December 18, 2005	Armageddon	Providence, RI	1	42	41		
72	Gregory Helms	January 29, 2006	Royal Rumble	Miami, FL	3	385	384	Formerly known as The Hurricane. This was a six-man Cruiserweight Open also involving Jamie Noble, Nunzio, Paul London, and Funaki, who Helms pinned. Helms, who was on the Raw roster at that time, moved to SmackDown! after winning the championship.	
73	Chavo Guerrero	February 18, 2007	No Way Out	Los Angeles, CA	6	154	153	This was an 8-man Cruiserweight Open, also involving Daivari, Shannon Moore, Funaki, Jamie Noble, Scotty 2 Hotty and Jimmy Wang Yang, who Guerrero last eliminated.	
74	Hornswoggle	July 22, 2007	The Great American Bash	San Jose, CA	1	65	68	This was a six-man Cruiserweight Open also involving Jimmy Wang Yang, Shannon Moore, Funaki and Jamie Noble, who Hornswoggle pinned. WWE recognizes his reign as ending on September 28, 2007, when the following episode aired on tape delay.	
—	Deactivated	September 25, 2007	SmackDown!	Indianapolis, IN	—	—	—	The championship was vacated on the September 25, 2007 edition of SmackDown! (aired September 28 on tape delay) by acting General Manager Vickie Guerrero, citing that Hornswoggle's status as Mr. McMahon's son and his diminutive stature would eventually jeopardize his well-being. The title was then retired without an official announcement. A new WWE Cruiserweight Championship was introduced in September 2016, but despite originally sharing a name with this title, it did not share its lineage.	

== Combined reigns ==
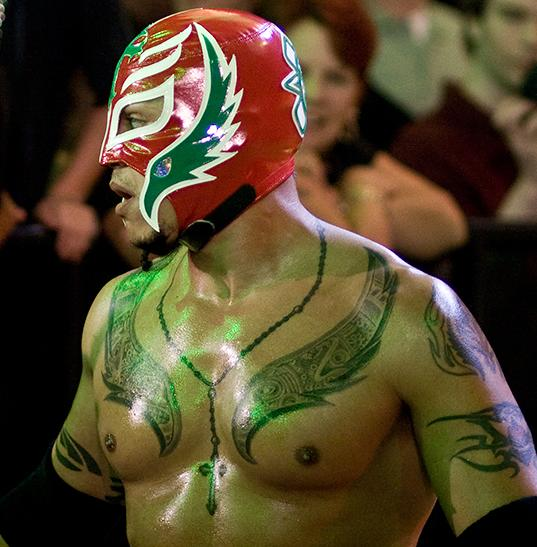
Record eight-time champion Rey Mysterio

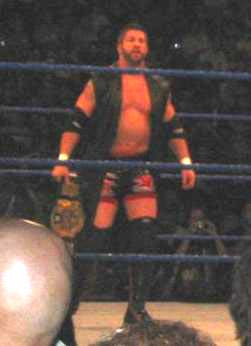
Helms has the longest reign in WWE Cruiserweight Championship history, holding the championship for 13 consecutive months in 2006 and 2007.

Rank	Champion	No. of reigns	Combined days	Combined days recognized by WWE
1	Gregory Helms/Hurricane Helms/Shane Helms	3	532	529
2	Rey Mysterio/Rey Mysterio Jr.	8	486	476
3	Chavo Guerrero/Chavo Guerrero Jr./Lieutenant Loco	6	431	
4	Billy Kidman	7	334	321
5	Tajiri	3	283	284
6	Chris Jericho	4	231	255
7	Syxx/X-Pac	2	196	195
8	Dean Malenko	4	188	185
9	Jamie Noble	1	147	146
10	Spike Dudley	1	138	135
11	Paul London	1	126	127
12	Juventud/Juventud Guerrera	5	113	105
13	Matt Hardy	1	100	101
14	Eddie Guerrero	2	91	89
15	Nunzio	2	75	72
16	Funaki	1	70	69
17	Hornswoggle	1	65	68
18	Mike Sanders	1	63	62
19	Elix Skipper	1	49	48
19	The Artist	2	49	47
21	Disco Inferno	1	48	
22	Lenny Lane	1	46	45
23	Shinjiro Otani	1	43	42
24	Kid Kash	1	42	41
25	Último Dragón	2	33	32
26	Chris Candido	1	29	28
27	Evan Karagias	1	28	27
27	Madusa	1	28	27
27	Chavo Classic	1	28	27
30	Daffney	1	22	20
31	Alex Wright	1	15	18
32	Lance Storm	1	14	13
33	Jacqueline	1	12	9
34	Crowbar	1	7	6
34	Psychosis	2	7	6
36	Oklahoma	1	2	1

== See also ==
- WCW Light Heavyweight Championship—A previous WCW-sanctioned light-heavyweight championship
