= MNM (professional wrestling) =

American wrestling stable

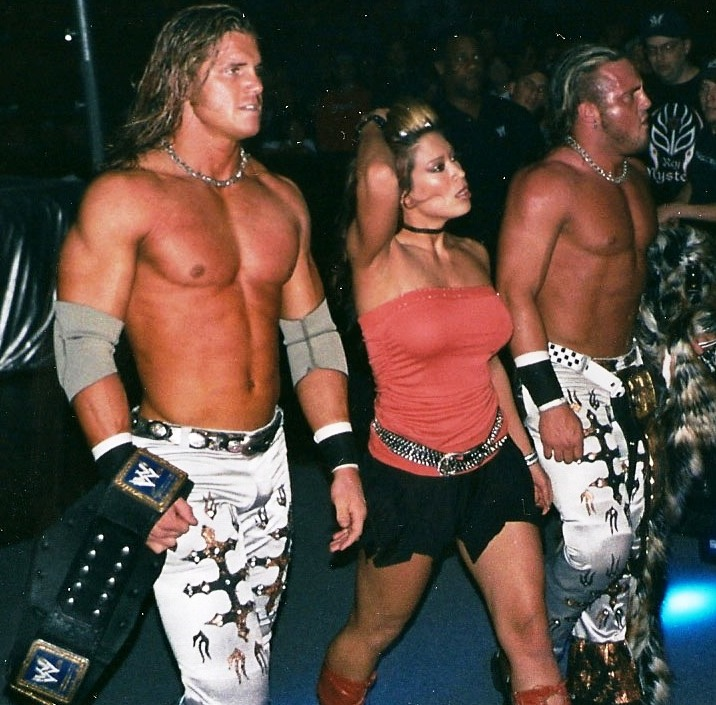
- Nitro (left), Melina (center), and Mercury (right) on an episode of SmackDown in 2006

Stable
- Members: Joey Matthews/Mercury; Johnny Nitro; Melina (valet)
- Name: MNM
- Billed heights: Mercury: 5 ft 9 in (1.75 m); Nitro: 6 ft 0 in (1.83 m); Melina: 5 ft 4 in (1.63 m)
- Combined billed weight: 555 lb (252 kg) (Mercury, Nitro and Melina)
- Billed from: Los Angeles, California
- Former members: Jillian Hall (valet)
- Debut: 2004
- Disbanded: 2017
- Years active: 2004–2006; 2006–2007; 2017

MNM (Mercury, Nitro, and Melina) were a professional wrestling stable in World Wrestling Entertainment (WWE) and Ohio Valley Wrestling (OVW) who consisted of Joey Mercury (previously Joey Matthews), Johnny Nitro, and their manager Melina Perez.

Mercury and Nitro first began teaming together in 2004 in OVW, WWE's developmental territory in Louisville, Kentucky. Melina, who at the time was Nitro's actual girlfriend, joined them as their manager in February 2005. While working in OVW, Mercury and Nitro captured the OVW Southern Tag Team Championship on one occasion.

MNM were called up to the SmackDown! roster in April 2005, in which Mercury and Nitro went on to win the WWE Tag Team Championship. While in WWE, their ring personas was that of a trio of Hollywood celebrities, complete with a red carpet ring entrance, that had them accompanied by "paparazzi". The duo lost the title in July 2005. After their third and final reign ended in May 2006, Nitro and Melina blamed Mercury for the loss and attacked him, splitting the team. Nitro and Melina were let go from the SmackDown! roster and debuted on the Raw brand. In November 2006, MNM reunited for a brief period, before Mercury was released from his contract in March 2007.

== Concept ==
Partly inspired by Paris Hilton, the concept behind the group was that they were Hollywood celebrities. Upon their debut on SmackDown!, they claimed to be the "it team on the scene", because of their good looks and celebrity status.

As part of their in-ring personas, MNM had a distinctive ring entrance. They walked to the ring on a red carpet, while members of the "paparazzi" took photos of them. The male members of MNM usually wore fur coats to the ring. As they took them off, Melina suggestively rubbed their abs while removing the title belts from their pants, where they hung in an exaggerated phallic fashion. Melina had a signature entrance which involved her doing a split on the ring apron—from the floor—then bending forward and crawling under the bottom rope.

== History ==
=== Ohio Valley Wrestling (2004–2005) ===
MNM was formed in the former World Wrestling Entertainment (WWE) "farm territory" Ohio Valley Wrestling (OVW). Melina Perez, Johnny Nitro's real-life girlfriend, was introduced into the company in 2004 as his ex-girlfriend, an ally of Matt Cappotelli with whom Nitro was engaged in a scripted rivalry. Almost immediately, however, Perez betrayed Cappotelli and sided with Nitro. Together they introduced Joey Matthews to become MNM. On November 16, 2004, they fought in a dark match on WWE Velocity losing to Matt Cappotelli and Johnny Jeter. While in OVW, Nitro and Matthews won the OVW Southern Tag Team Championship once, holding it for over two months. They dropped the titles to Cappotelli and Jeter on January 19, 2005.

=== Tag Team Championship reigns (2005–2006) ===
MNM was called up to WWE's SmackDown! roster in April 2005, with Matthews undergoing a name change to "Joey Mercury". They made their debut on the April 14 episode of SmackDown! during Carlito's interview segment Carlito's Cabana, where they interrupted an interview between Carlito and Rey Mysterio, and attacked Mysterio. This provoked a feud between MNM and Mysterio and his partner, Eddie Guerrero, over the WWE Tag Team Championship. Two weeks later, in their debut match on the SmackDown! brand, they defeated Mysterio and Guerrero to win the WWE Tag Team Championship after Guerrero refused to tag into the match. While Nitro and Mercury held the championship, Melina was placed in an angle with Heidenreich. She publicly mocked him and was the impetus for an attack on him by Nitro and Mercury. In July, MNM were scheduled to face Heidenreich in a two-on-one handicap match, but attacked him before the match started. Road Warrior Animal saved Heidenreich from the attack and as a result, Heidenreich and Road Warrior Animal challenged Mercury and Nitro for the WWE Tag Team Championship at The Great American Bash on July 24. MNM lost the match and the championship to Heidenreich and Animal at The Great American Bash.

The loss of the WWE Tag Team Championship was seen as "bad publicity" by Melina so she introduced Jillian Hall, a storyline spin doctor to repair their image on the July 28 episode of SmackDown!. Hall got them a cover article in SmackDown! magazine, and began to introduce the team before and aid them during matches. In September, Hall left the group to join John "Bradshaw" Layfield (JBL), who had lost a match to Rey Mysterio on the September 16 episode of SmackDown!.

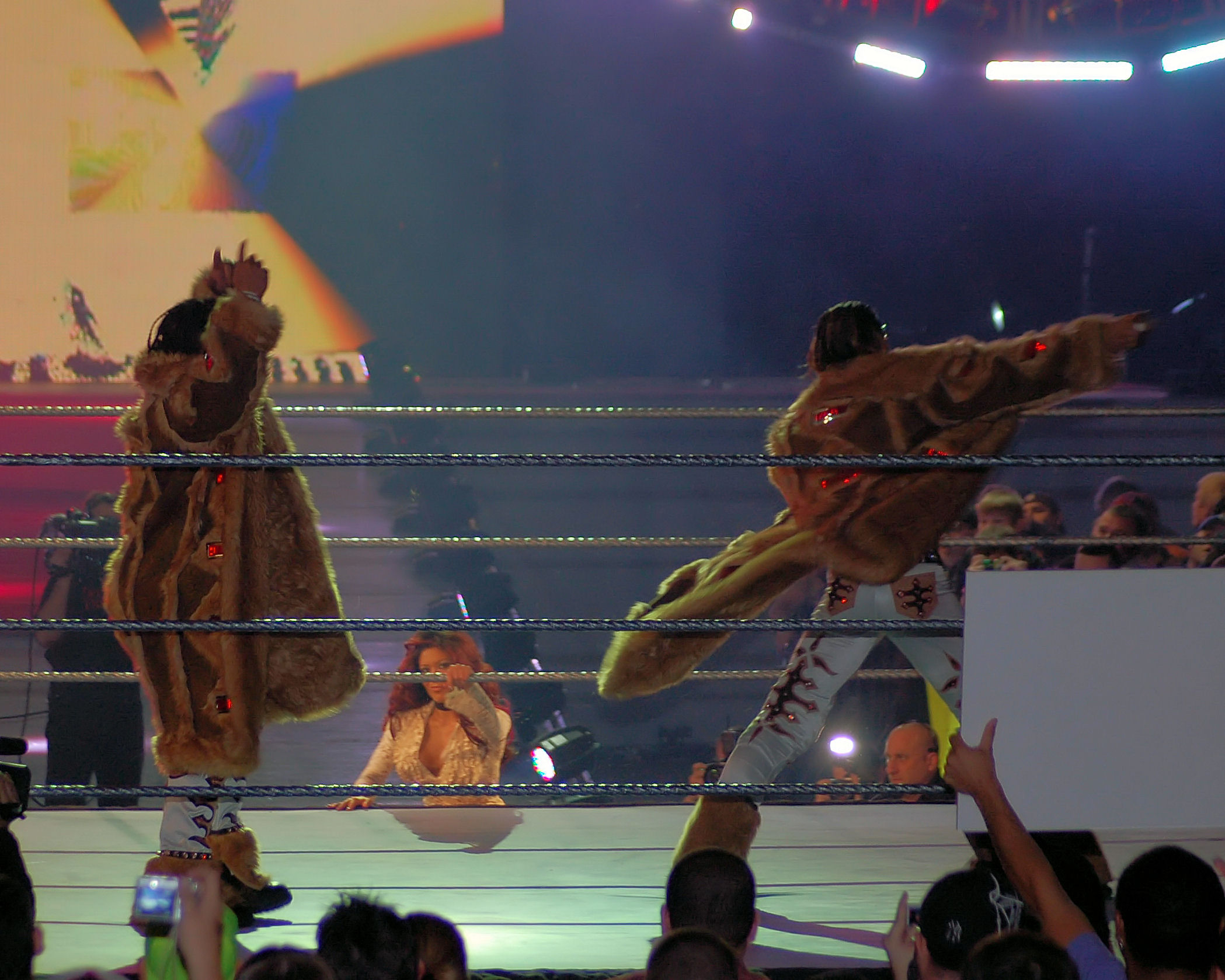
Joey Mercury (left), Melina (bottom), and Johnny Nitro during their ring entrance at December to Dismember (2006)

On the October 28 episode of SmackDown!, Mercury and Nitro were placed into a tag team title fatal four-way match against the teams of the Mexicools (Super Crazy and Psicosis), William Regal and Paul Burchill, and the WWE Tag Team Champions Legion of Doom 2005 (Heidenreich and Road Warrior Animal). During the match, Mercury and Nitro were able to perform the Snapshot on Heidenreich, to win the championship for a second time. MNM successfully defended the championship against Eddie Guerrero and Batista on the November 4 episode of SmackDown!. In December, they began a feud with the Mexicools, who earned the right to face MNM at Armageddon for the WWE Tag Team Championship. Before Armageddon however, on the December 16 episode of SmackDown!, MNM lost the WWE Tag Team Championship to Batista and Rey Mysterio. A storyline was begun before the match, where Melina attempted to seduce Batista into forfeiting the match. The storyline played over to the December 30 episode of SmackDown! when, before MNM invoked their rematch clause, Melina held a press conference in the ring where she claimed that Batista had sexually harassed her. During the tag team match, Mark Henry aided MNM in winning back the WWE Tag Team Championship. The following week on the January 6, 2006 episode of SmackDown!, MNM defeated Batista and Mysterio in a steel cage match to retain the championship, Henry's aid. Henry was only with the group a short time before his contract was sold to Daivari in storyline. They went on to successfully defend the championship against The Mexicools and the team of Matt Hardy and Tatanka in early 2006.

=== Dissolution (2006–2007) ===
In April 2006, MNM were placed in an angle in which they found themselves in a losing streak against the team of Paul London and Brian Kendrick. In non-title tag team matches, singles matches, and even a six-man tag match, London and Kendrick defeated the duo every time. At the Judgment Day pay-per-view in May 2006, MNM lost the WWE Tag Team Championship to London and Kendrick. After the match, Nitro and Mercury started brawling, disbanding the group. Later that night, Melina lost a singles match against Jillian Hall and after angrily slapping General manager Theodore Long, she and Nitro were fired from the SmackDown! brand in storyline. Off-screen, Nitro and Mercury did not get along, and WWE management decided to split the tag team and send Nitro and Melina to the Raw brand. In addition, Mercury was about to begin serving a suspension for violating the WWE Wellness program.

After the team split, Nitro, alongside Melina, was quickly placed into the Intercontinental Championship picture, winning the title twice. In November, after serving his suspension and a brief stint back in OVW, Mercury returned to WWE, reuniting MNM to answer an open challenge put out by The Hardys (Matt and Jeff) for the December to Dismember pay-per-view. At December to Dismember, MNM lost to the Hardys. MNM and the Hardys met again at Armageddon as part of a four-way ladder match, which also included the teams of Dave Taylor and William Regal and Paul London and Brian Kendrick. During the match, which saw London and Kendrick retain the WWE Tag Team Championship, Mercury was legitimately injured when he was struck in the face with a ladder, necessitating a trip to the emergency room where his broken nose received 15 stitches. The facial injury was worked into the angle, and when Mercury returned wearing a protective covering on his face, the rivalry between the teams intensified with MNM actively seeking to injure one or both of the Hardys, even going so far as to attack and perform a Snapshot on Matt on exposed concrete following a match. MNM lost to The Hardys at the Royal Rumble, and again at the No Way Out pay-per-view in February (in which they teamed with Montel Vontavious Porter while The Hardys teamed with Chris Benoit), which concluded the feud.

=== Post-breakup ===
After their feud with the Hardys was over, Nitro and Melina continued to team on Raw, while Mercury wrestled in singles competition on SmackDown!. On March 26, 2007, through WWE's official website, it was announced that Mercury had been released from his contract.

Melina and Nitro's association began to fizzle out when Melina became the WWE Women's Champion and began garnering attention as a singles performer. Melina was released from her contract in 2011.

During the 2007 supplemental draft, Nitro moved to the ECW brand, was renamed John Morrison and would go on to capture the ECW World Championship. Morrison formed a partnership with The Miz, capturing both the WWE Tag Team Championship and the World Tag Team Championship, as well as becoming a two-time Slammy Award winner. He also gained his third WWE Intercontinental Championship shortly after his alliance with The Miz, before leaving WWE in November 2011.

Mercury returned to WWE in 2010, first as a member of CM Punk's Straight Edge Society, and later began working as a trainer in Florida Championship Wrestling (later renamed NXT). He most recently appeared on television alongside The Authority and as part of J&J Security, former WWE World Heavyweight Champion Seth Rollins's "personal security".

Nitro and Melina had a brief reunion when Melina made an appearance in Lucha Underground at Ultima Lucha, attacking Alberto El Patron during his match with Nitro, now known as Johnny Mundo, allowing Nitro to pick up the win.

On September 22, 2017, Nitro, under his John Morrison ring name, and Mercury reunited for the first time in ten years at an All Pro Wrestling event, defeating Reno Scum.

== Championships and accomplishments ==
- Ohio Valley Wrestling
  - OVW Southern Tag Team Championship (1 time)
- Pro Wrestling Illustrated
  - Tag Team of the Year (2005)
- World Wrestling Entertainment
  - WWE Intercontinental Championship (2 times) – Johnny Nitro
  - WWE Tag Team Championship (3 times)
  - WWE Women's Championship (1 time) – Melina
