= Armageddon (2005) =

World Wrestling Entertainment pay-per-view event

- Promotional poster featuring Batista
- Promotion: World Wrestling Entertainment
- Brand: SmackDown!
- Date: December 18, 2005
- City: Providence, Rhode Island
- Venue: Dunkin' Donuts Center
- Attendance: 8,000
- Buy rate: 320,000

Pay-per-view chronology
← Previous; Survivor Series	Next → New Year's Revolution

Armageddon chronology
← Previous; 2004	Next → 2006

The 2005 Armageddon was a professional wrestling pay-per-view (PPV) event produced by World Wrestling Entertainment (WWE). It was the sixth Armageddon and took place on December 18, 2005, at the Dunkin' Donuts Center in Providence, Rhode Island, held primarily for wrestlers from the promotion's SmackDown! brand division.

The main event was a Hell in a Cell match between Randy Orton and The Undertaker, which Undertaker won by pinfall after performing a Tombstone piledriver. One of the predominant matches on the card was an interpromotional tag team match pitting SmackDown!'s WWE Tag Team Champions, Rey Mysterio and Batista, against Raw's World Tag Team Champions, Big Show and Kane, in a non-title champions versus champions match. Big Show and Kane won the match after Kane pinned Mysterio following a chokeslam. Another primary match on the undercard was Booker T versus Chris Benoit in the fourth match of their "Best of 7" series for the vacant WWE United States Championship. Benoit won the match after forcing Booker to submit with the Crippler Crossface, thus earning his first victory in the series.

== Production ==
=== Background ===
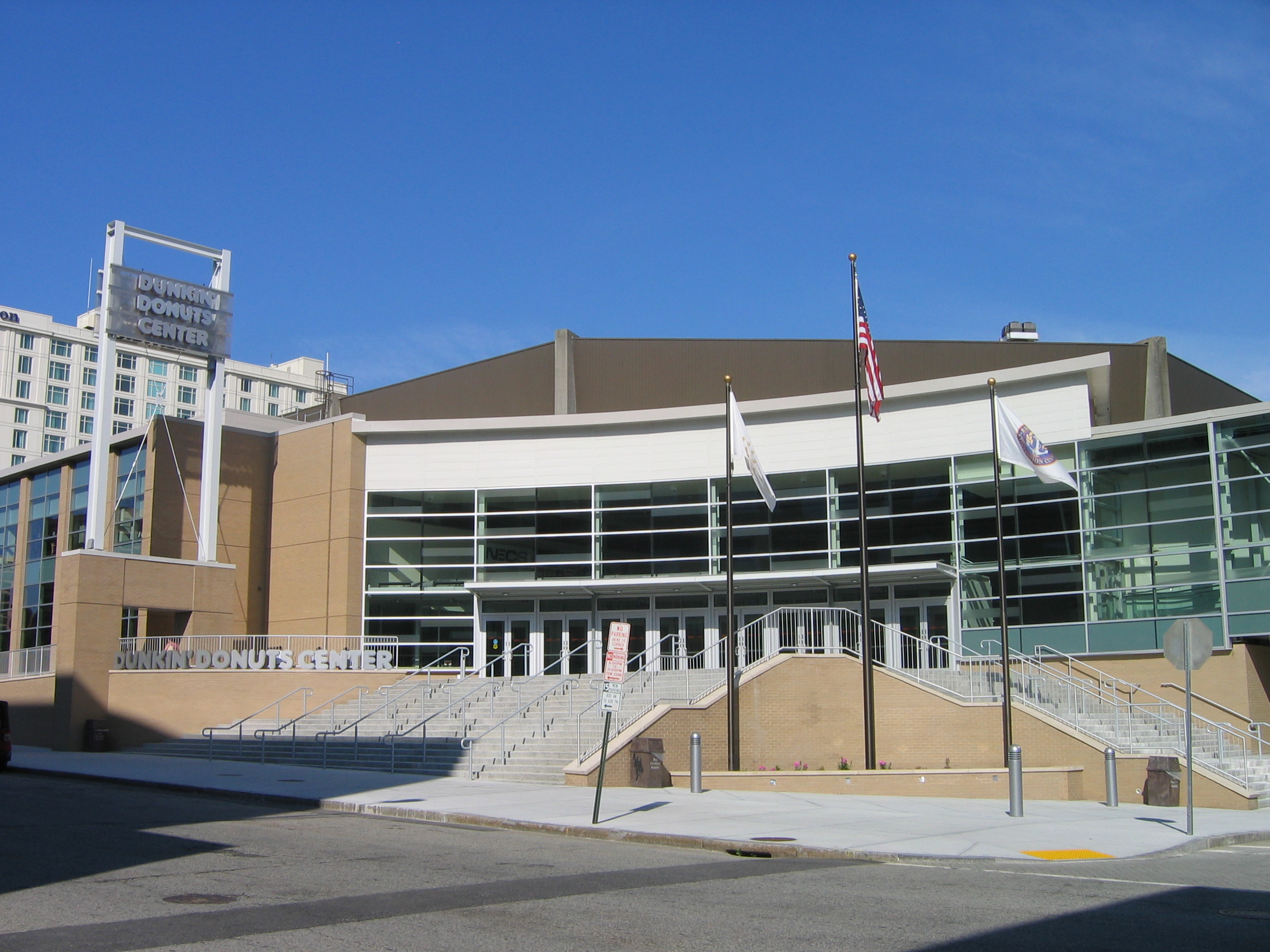
The sixth Armageddon was held at the Dunkin' Donuts Center in Providence, Rhode Island.

Armageddon was a professional wrestling pay-per-view (PPV) event established by World Wrestling Entertainment (WWE) in 1999 and held every December except in 2001. The sixth event was held on December 18, 2005, at the Dunkin' Donuts Center in Providence, Rhode Island. Like the previous year, the 2005 event featured wrestlers exclusively from the SmackDown! brand, with the exception of one interpromotional tag team match that had wrestlers from Raw.

=== Storylines ===
The event featured six professional wrestling matches with different wrestlers involved in pre-existing scripted feuds, plots and storylines. All wrestlers (aside from the one interpromotional match) belonged to the SmackDown! brand – a storyline division in which WWE assigned its employees to a different program, the other being Raw.

The main event at Armageddon was fought in a Hell in a Cell match stipulation between The Undertaker and Randy Orton. The buildup to the match began at WrestleMania 21 where The Undertaker defeated Orton, a Raw wrestler at the time, in an Interpromotional match. On the June 16 episode of SmackDown!, during the third annual WWE Draft Lottery, Orton was drafted to the SmackDown! brand and attacked The Undertaker during his match with John "Bradshaw" Layfield (JBL). At the August pay-per-view event, SummerSlam, Orton defeated The Undertaker, where he pinned him after performing an RKO following interference from his father, "Cowboy" Bob Orton. This led to a Handicap Casket match between The Undertaker and the Ortons at No Mercy. At No Mercy, the Ortons defeated The Undertaker and set the casket on fire. The proceeding month, at Survivor Series, The Undertaker returned and attacked several SmackDown! superstars following a 5-on-5 Survivor Series match between Team Raw and Team SmackDown!. Orton, who won the match for Team SmackDown!, was able to escape the attack. Then, on the December 2 episode of SmackDown!, The Undertaker called Orton to face him inside Hell in a Cell at Armageddon, which was made official.

The pay-per-view event featured the buildup of a rivalry among two tag teams, a group of at least two wrestlers. The two groups were Batista and Rey Mysterio versus Big Show and Kane. On the November 11 episode of SmackDown!, an interpromotional Street Fight match was scheduled between Batista and Edge. Edge, who earlier in the night, pleaded to Batista not go through the match. Batista, however, declined to cancel the match. Outside the arena, General Manager Theodore Long was outside talking to Raw General Manager Eric Bischoff, who had just arrived to the show. As Long and Bischoff were talking, Chris Masters showed up and grabbed Long from behind and placed him in a full nelson submission hold, which he calls the Master Lock. After the assault on Long, Bischoff and Masters got into a limousine and drove away from the arena. Rey Mysterio, Matt Hardy, and John "Bradshaw" Layfield (JBL) got into JBL's limousine and followed Bishoff and Masters. Inside the arena, Kane and the Big Show showed up and chokeslammed Batista. The chokeslam resulted in Batista legitimately injuring his back. On the November 21 episode of Raw, one of WWE's primary television programs, SmackDown! superstars, Batista, Randy Orton, JBL, Rey Mysterio, and Bobby Lashley, arrived to the show's arena. The Raw superstars met the SmackDown! superstars and a brawl broke out between both rosters. The fight led to Kane and the Big Show to double chokeslam Batista on top of a car, which was scripted so that Batista could attend to his injury. On the November 25 episode of SmackDown!, Batista was scheduled to defend his World Heavyweight Championship against Orton in a No Holds Barred match. Batista retained his title after the Raw roster showed up to the arena and began a fight with the SmackDown! roster. Kane and the Big Show double chokeslammed Batista into the announcer's table.

== Event ==
Other on-screen personnel
Role:	Name:
English commentators	Michael Cole
English commentators	Tazz
Spanish commentators	Carlos Cabrera
Spanish commentators	Hugo Savinovich
Ring announcer	Tony Chimel
Referees	Nick Patrick
Referees	Charles Robinson
Referees	Jim Korderas
Referees	Brian Hebner
Referees	Chris Kay

=== Pre-show ===
Prior to the pay-per-view, Jamie Noble defeated Funaki on Sunday Night Heat.

=== Main card ===
The first match was a match between Matt Hardy and John "Bradshaw" Layfield (JBL) (with Jillian Hall). JBL would have most of the offense for the entire match, since at the beginning of the match, Hardy got caught up, neck first, between the top and middle rope, and stayed there for a little while as JBL proceeded to choke, punch and kick his head in. After attacking Hardy for a few minutes, JBL illegally ripped off a turnbuckle pad, sent Hardy into it and executed a Clothesline From Hell for the win.

In the second match, The Mexicools (Super Crazy and Psicosis) faced MNM (Joey Mercury and Johnny Nitro) (with Melina). Psicosis and Super Crazy performed many high-flying moves, landing a corkscrew as well as a tope con hilo over the referee's back. Melina got involved, tripping up Psicosis and taking away his momentum. MNM used their double teaming tactics to wear down Psicosis, keeping him isolated from making the tag. Once the tag was made, Super Crazy controlled most of the offense for the rest of the match. Melina tried to get involved again, but was sent down for her troubles. Super Crazy executed a moonsault on Mercury, but Nitro broke the pinfall, leading to the Snapshot for the win.

In the third match, Booker T (with Sharmell) faced Chris Benoit in match four of a best of seven series match for the vacant WWE United States Championship. There were multiple chops and suplexes from both wrestlers. They seemed to be a little off their game however, floundering a bit at times. Several Crossface attempts, as well as a low blow/scissor kick combination from Sharmell and Booker T all failed to win the match for both wrestlers. With Booker T down, Benoit executed a Diving headbutt, only for a near-fall. Benoit once again went for the crossface, but this time Booker T rolled through and hit referee Jim Korderas. Benoit was quick to apply the Sharpshooter, forcing Booker T to submit but the referee was out. Sharmell came in and hit Benoit with the broom, but that did not affect him. As he was distracted, Booker T attacked Benoit, setting up for the Book End, which was reversed into a DDT and Benoit forced Booker T to submit with a Crossface for the victory.

In the fourth match, Bobby Lashley faced William Regal and Paul Burchill in a 2-on-1 Handicap Match. Lashley was in control for most of the match. He used the Dominator on Burchill to win the match.

In the fifth match, Juventud faced Kid Kash for the WWE Cruiserweight Championship. In the end, Kash went for a springboard moonsault, but caught a pair of knees to the midsection. Juventud then executed a huricanrana off the top rope, and executed a Juvi Driver for the two count. Kash countered a front flip leg drop with a Dead Level to win the title.

In the sixth match, WWE Tag Team Champions Batista and Rey Mysterio faced World Tag Team Champions Big Show and Kane in an Interpromotional Tag Team Champions vs Champions match. Each team demonstrated their strength, with Mysterio being the only man out of place. The match evolved into a brawl, with Batista and Big Show wrestling over the broadcast table, as Mysterio executed 619 to Kane. He went for the West Coast Pop, but Kane caught him in midair, chokeslamming him for the win.

=== Main event ===
In the main event, The Undertaker faced Randy Orton (with Bob Orton) inside Hell in a Cell. During the match, The Undertaker hit Orton with a steel chair, bloodying Orton. Orton hit The Undertaker with the steel steps, bloodying The Undertaker also. "Cowboy" Bob Orton tried intervening, but The Undertaker executed a Big Boot, causing the Cell and Bob to collide, causing a laceration. Orton executed a Diving Splash through a table on The Undertaker for a near-fall. Orton ducked a punch from The Undertaker that caught referee Nick Patrick, bloodying him as well. As referees and EMTs came down, Bob entered the Cell. Orton executed an RKO, but there was no referee to make the count. Charles Robinson made the count, but The Undertaker kicked out at two. The Undertaker executed a Last Ride on Orton but Bob broke up the pinfall, leading The Undertaker to attack Bob. The Undertaker attempted a Tombstone Piledriver on Orton but Orton reversed into a Tombstone on The Undertaker for a near-fall. Bob tried to get involved again but The Undertaker attacked Bob. The Undertaker hit Bob and Orton with an urn and executed a Tombstone on Bob. The Undertaker executed a Tombstone Piledriver on Orton to win the match.

== Aftermath ==
In the "Best of Seven" series, Booker T ended up winning the vacant WWE United States Championship on the January 13, 2006, episode of SmackDown in Philadelphia, with the help of Randy Orton. The feud between Randy Orton and The Undertaker ended in the Hell in a Cell match after the feud ran for about nine months. Batista and Rey Mysterio, who were the WWE Tag Team Championship holders at the time, lost the title to the team of MNM after Batista suffered a legitimate injury in early 2006, sidelining him for up to seven months. Big Show and Kane continued to reign as World Tag Team Champions until April 2006.

=== Controversies ===
In the aftermath of the Hell in a Cell match Bob Orton got released by WWE for testing positive for Hepatitis C and almost getting The Undertaker infected. Orton had Hepatitis C for at least a few years but had not notified WWE about it and the producer for this encounter let the match take place.

== Results ==
No.	Results	Stipulations	Times
1^{H}	Jamie Noble defeated Funaki	Singles match	3:30
2	John "Bradshaw" Layfield (with Jillian Hall) defeated Matt Hardy	Singles match	6:44
3	MNM (Joey Mercury and Johnny Nitro) (with Melina) defeated The Mexicools (Super Crazy and Psicosis)	Tag team match	8:56
4	Chris Benoit defeated Booker T (with Sharmell) by submission	Singles match for the vacant WWE United States Championship; Fourth in the best of seven series	20:11
5	Bobby Lashley defeated William Regal and Paul Burchill	Handicap match	3:38
6	Kid Kash defeated Juventud (c)	Singles match for the WWE Cruiserweight Championship	9:25
7	Big Show and Kane defeated Rey Mysterio and Batista	Tag team match	8:38
8	The Undertaker defeated Randy Orton (with Bob Orton) by pinfall	Hell in a Cell match	31:31
(c) / – the champion(s) heading into the match; H / – the match was broadcast prior to the pay-per-view on Sunday Night Heat
