= Shoichi Funaki =

Japanese professional wrestler and commentator (born 1968)

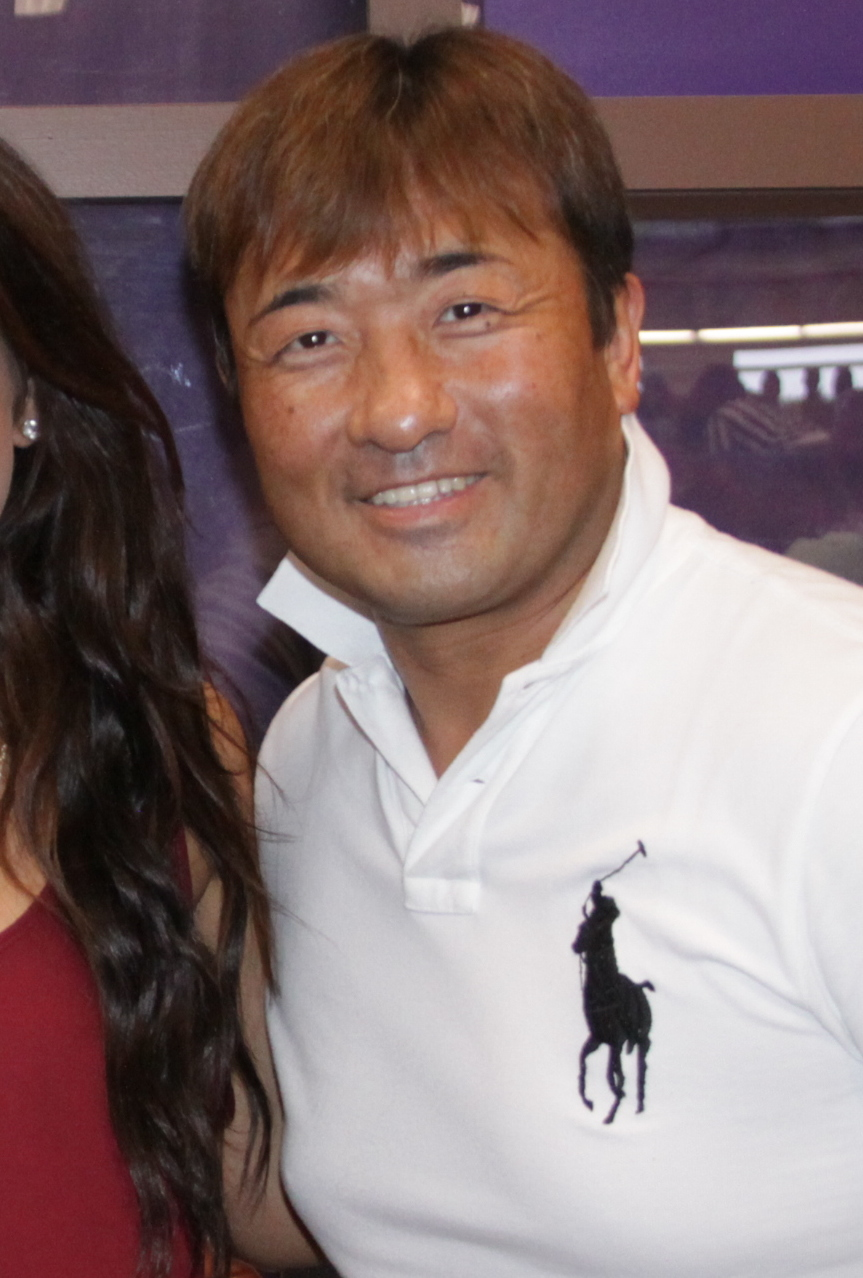
- Funaki in 2015

Personal information
- Born: August 24, 1968 (age 58) Tokyo, Japan

Professional wrestling career
- Ring name(s): Funaki; Kung Fu Naki; Shoichi Funaki; Sho Funaki
- Billed height: 5 ft 7 in (170 cm)
- Billed weight: 180 lb (82 kg)
- Billed from: Tokyo, Japan
- Trained by: Animal Hamaguchi; Yoshiaki Fujiwara
- Debut: 1993
- Retired: October 2015

Shoichi "Sho" Funaki (船木 勝一, Funaki Shōichi) (born August 24, 1968) is a Japanese professional wrestling manager, color commentator and retired professional wrestler signed to WWE, where he works as a Japanese-language play-by-play commentator and an occasional interpreter for Japanese talents in the company. During his time as an in-ring performer, he became a one-time Cruiserweight Champion and a one-time Hardcore Champion.

== Professional wrestling career ==
=== Early years (1993–1998) ===
Funaki started as a shoot style wrestler in Yoshiaki Fujiwara's Pro Wrestling Fujiwara Gumi promotion and moved to its successor promotion, Battlarts. He later found the lucha libre style more to his liking, so he moved to The Great Sasuke's promotion, Michinoku Pro Wrestling. In that promotion, he joined with Taka Michinoku, Dick Togo, Men's Teioh and Shiryu in the Kai En Tai stable. Funaki also wrestled in the Universal Wrestling Association (UWA) where he won the UWA World Middleweight Championship from El Pantera on March 19, 1997, in Japan.

=== World Wrestling Federation/Entertainment (1998-2010) ===
==== Kai En Tai (1998–2001) ====
In March 1998, Funaki, along with Teioh and Togo, joined the World Wrestling Federation. Initially, they feuded with Taka Michinoku and defeated him and his partner John Bradshaw in a 3-on-2 handicap match at Over the Edge: In Your House. They lost to Michinoku and The Headbangers at King of the Ring in a six-man tag team match.

Michinoku eventually turned villainous and joined the group. At SummerSlam, Kai En Tai lost to Oddities members Kurrgan, Giant Silva and Golga in a handicap match. Over time, the stable turned into a tag team, as in 1999, Teioh and Togo (and manager Yamaguchi-san) were given their releases. Michinoku and Funaki were often used for comedic purposes, often having their pre-match promos dubbed—while Michinoku would "deliver" the majority of dialogue for the duo, Funaki would "respond" strongly with a simple "INDEED".

At WrestleMania 2000, Funaki participated in a 15-minute hardcore battle royal for the WWF Hardcore Championship. Funaki pinned Viscera after a diving shoulder block from Bradshaw but he was later pinned by Rodney. Hardcore Holly ultimately won the match and became the official champion. At Unforgiven, Funaki once again participated in a hardcore battle royal which was won by the defending champion Steve Blackman.

In 2001, Kai En Tai started participating in non-televised matches before pay-per-view events such as the Royal Rumble and Judgment Day.

==== SmackDown!'s No. 1 Announcer (2001–2003) ====
Michinoku left the WWF in October 2001, resulting in Funaki moving to singles competition. At Survivor Series, Funaki participated in an Immunity Battle Royal which was won by Test. In 2002, Funaki moved to the SmackDown! brand after the WWF roster was split into two brands. He turned face and found himself as a lower card wrestler and adopted the gimmick of "SmackDown!'s number one announcer", performing backstage interviews between matches, while competing in the cruiserweight division. As part of SmackDown! brand, Funaki mostly wrestled on Velocity. At Rebellion, Funaki defeated Crash Holly. At Vengeance in 2003, Funaki participated in the APA Invitational Bar Room Brawl which was won by Bradshaw. For the rest of 2003, Funaki worked in house shows and made occasional appearances on Velocity with less TV time.

==== Cruiserweight Champion (2004–2005) ====
On the March 4, 2004 episode of SmackDown!, Funaki lost to Cruiserweight Champion Chavo Guerrero Jr. in a non-title match. On the March 11 episode of SmackDown!, Funaki participated in an 8-man cruiserweight tag team match teaming with fellow cruiserweights Rey Mysterio, Último Dragón and Billy Kidman against Tajiri, Akio, Sakoda and Jamie Noble. At WrestleMania XX, Funaki participated in a Cruiserweight Open for the Cruiserweight Championship but was pinned by Jamie Noble.

On the December 9 episode of SmackDown!, Funaki won a cruiserweight over the top rope number one contender's battle royal which included Chavo Guerrero, Paul London, Billy Kidman, Akio, Shannon Moore and Nunzio. At Armageddon, Funaki defeated Spike Dudley to win the Cruiserweight Championship. Funaki successfully defended the title against Spike Dudley, Akio and Nunzio. His last successful title defense was against Chavo Guerrero on the February 10, 2005 episode of SmackDown!, notably held in Funaki's birth country, Japan.

==== Cruiserweight Division (2005–2008) ====
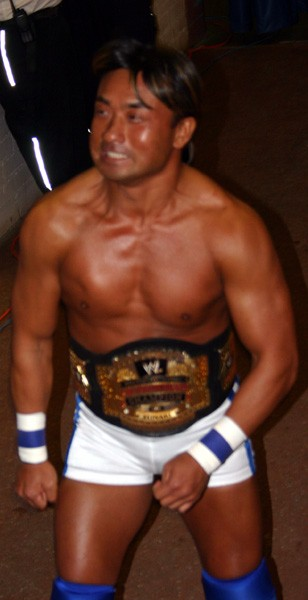
Funaki as the Cruiserweight Champion in 2005

Funaki lost the championship to Chavo Guerrero in a six-man Cruiserweight Open match at No Way Out. At Armageddon, he lost to Jamie Noble in a match on Heat. During an interview with then Cruiserweight Champion Kid Kash on an episode of SmackDown!, Funaki was assaulted by Kash, who gave him a brainbuster onto the interview platform.

At the Royal Rumble, Funaki faced Kid Kash in a match for the title, when he was entered into a Cruiserweight Open along with four other Cruiserweight champions, including the champion Kash. Funaki was pinned in this one fall match by then Raw superstar Gregory Helms, who won the match and title. At No Way Out, Funaki participated in a Nine Man Cruiserweight Match for the WWE Cruiserweight Championship but Helms retained the title. Since that time Funaki, would regularly team with Scotty 2 Hotty during episodes of Velocity and SmackDown!. During one such Velocity taping, however, Funaki suffered a 2nd Grade concussion, where he was unconscious for just under two minutes. Funaki would resume wrestling later that year, forming a tag team of sorts with Scotty 2 Hotty, which was mainly used to put over debuting wrestlers or tag teams.

Funaki made a one-off appearance at the Puroresu King Indy Summit, on December 31, 2006, reuniting with Kai En Tai DX in what was being billed as a Kai En Tai DX Revival Ten-Man Tag Match; Funaki reteamed with Taka Michinoku, Kaz Hayashi, Dick Togo and Men's Teioh to face five other wrestlers. Funaki returned to WWE television on the February 16, 2007 episode of SmackDown! in a brawl that involved the other SmackDown! cruiserweights and the then-Cruiserweight Champion Gregory Helms.

At No Way Out, Funaki participated in a Cruiserweight Open match for the WWE Cruiserweight Championship but was pinned by the champion Helms. On the May 18 episode of SmackDown!, Funaki was made short work of by recently returned superstar Mark Henry. On the June 29 episode of SmackDown!, Funaki got a shot at the Cruiserweight title against Cruiserweight Champion Chavo Guerrero and Jamie Noble, but came up short. At The Great American Bash, he participated in a match for the Cruiserweight Championship which Hornswoggle won. On the December 14 episode of SmackDown!, he wrestled in a squash match against Edge. He also made a televised appearance on January 4, 2008, episode of SmackDown! where he lost to Chavo Guerrero in a Beat the Clock match. He suffered a defeat to The Great Khali on April 21, 2008, in Khali's SmackDown return match. On June 6, 2008 Funaki appeared on SmackDown's main event teaming with Batista, Colin Delaney and Nunzio defeating Edge, Chavo Guerrero, Curt Hawkins and Zack Ryder. Funaki legitimately broke his nose at a joint SmackDown/ECW taping in Houston, Texas, during a dark match against Vladimir Kozlov.

==== Kung Fu Naki (2008–2010) ====
On October 10, 2008, Funaki revealed his full name to be "Kung Fu Naki" during a backstage segment with R-Truth. This was used as the basis for a gimmick change for Funaki; he then came to the ring dressed in a gi and tweaked his moveset to incorporate theatrical martial arts moves. His first match as Kung Fu Naki saw him scoring a pinfall win over Montel Vontavious Porter (MVP) and Shelton Benjamin in a tag team match with R-Truth. Kung Fu Naki then defeated MVP in a singles match on the November 14, 2008 episode of SmackDown when The Great Khali interfered and distracted MVP. His first loss in the character was against WWE Champion Edge on the December 5, 2008, episode of SmackDown. He wrestled in house shows until March 2009. He was inexplicably absent from WWE action until WrestleMania XXVI, where he took part in the 26 Man Battle Royal match, which was won by Yoshi Tatsu. On April 22, 2010, WWE released Funaki, ending his 12-year stint with the company.

=== Return to Japan and Independent circuit (2010–2015) ===
After his WWE release, Pro Wrestling Zero1 announced they had signed Funaki to return to Japan and team with his former student Ikuto Hidaka.

On December 4, 2010, San Antonio, Texas–based Branded Outlaw Wrestling (BOW) announced that it had reached a working agreement with Funaki to host his new professional wrestling school, named the Funaki Dojo. The school's first class started on January 15, 2011.

On December 6, 2013, at TNA One Night Only: World Cup of Wrestling, as a part of Team International, Funaki and Petey Williams lost to Team Aces & Eights' DOC and Knux.

On December 6, 2014, Funaki worked for the Japanese Pro Wrestling Noah promotion, teaming with Scotty 2 Hotty and Super Crazy in a six-man tag team match, where they defeated Pesadilla, Yoshinari Ogawa and Zack Sabre Jr., with Scotty 2 Hotty pinning Pesadilla for the win.

Funaki wrestled his last matches in Japan for Dradition Pro-Wrestling in October 2015, retiring from wrestling.

=== Return to WWE (2011-present) ===
==== Sporadic appearances (2011–2016) ====
Funaki cameoed for WWE as a special guest referee during their house shows in Japan in 2011 and 2013.

Funaki made a special appearance in a video as a translator for Kenta's first WWE interview with Renee Young. In September, Funaki returned to WWE's developmental program NXT to feud with The Ascension alongside Kenta, who was now going by the name Hideo Itami.

==== Japanese commentator (2016–present) ====
Funaki would appear in the WWE Network show, The Edge and Christian Show, introducing the hosts, with his voice dubbed over by Howard Finkel in the first season and Luke Gallows in the second season.

On April 1, 2016, at NXT Takeover: Dallas, Funaki appeared in a backstage segment with Shinsuke Nakamura. Funaki would later appear at ringside sitting next to Kota Ibushi.

Since WrestleMania 32, Funaki has been one-half of the Japanese commentary team for all WWE pay-per-view events, while also continuing his duties as an interpreter for Japanese wrestlers in backstage interviews.

In an exclusive interview for WWE's YouTube channel after the final match of the WWE Mae Young Classic on September 12, 2017, Funaki served as Kairi Sane's interpreter.

Starting in September 2024, Funaki made appearances on NXT as a translator for Giulia.

== Funaki Dojo ==
Funaki opened his training facility, Funaki Dojo in San Antonio, Texas in June 2012.

== Personal life ==
Along with Japanese and English, Funaki is fluent in French, German, Portuguese, and Spanish. He was a regular on WWE's short-lived Spanish-language show Los Super Astros, which was televised on Univision.

On August 30, 2007, Funaki, along with nine other superstars, were named in Sports Illustrated as recipients of illegal steroids not in compliance with the WWE Talent Wellness Program. Funaki was said to have received somatropin in March 2006.

Funaki has a son, Jesse, who is also a professional wrestler, having made his debut in 2024.

== Championships and accomplishments ==
- Pro Wrestling Fujiwara Gumi
  - Challenge Cup Tournament (1994)
- Pro Wrestling Illustrated
  - PWI ranked him #103 of the top 500 singles wrestlers of the year in the PWI 500 in 2001
- Texas Wrestling Alliance
  - TWA Heavyweight Championship (1 time)
- Universal Wrestling Association
  - UWA World Middleweight Championship (1 time)
- World Wrestling Federation / World Wrestling Entertainment
  - WWE Cruiserweight Championship (1 time)
  - WWF Hardcore Championship (1 time)
