= WWE Cruiserweight Championship (1996–2007) =

Professional wrestling championship

- The WWE Cruiserweight Championship belt (2002–2007)

Details
- Promotion: WCW (1996–2001); WWF/WWE (2001–2007)
- Date established: March 20, 1996 (Note: The date it was established in WCW before WWE's purchase.); October 27, 1991 (Note: As per WWE's official title history, which considers the WCW Light Heavyweight Championship and the Cruiserweight Championship to be one and the same.)
- Date retired: September 28, 2007

Other names
- WCW Light Heavyweight Championship (1991–1992) (Note: As per WWE's official title history, which considers the WCW Light Heavyweight Championship and the Cruiserweight Championship to be one and the same.); WCW Cruiserweight Championship (1996–2001); WWF Cruiserweight Championship (2001–2002); WWE Cruiserweight Championship (2002–2007)
Statistics
- First champion: Shinjiro Otani (Note: Otani was the inaugural champion in WCW before WWE's purchase.)
- Final champion: Hornswoggle
- Most reigns: Rey Mysterio (8 reigns)
- Longest reign: Gregory Helms (3rd reign, 385 days) (Note: 384 days as recognized by WWE.)
- Shortest reign: Psicosis (1 hour)
- Oldest champion: Chavo Classic (55 years, 132 days)
- Youngest champion: Hornswoggle (21 years, 54 days)
- Heaviest champion: Oklahoma (222 lb (101 kg))
- Lightest champion: Jacqueline (119 lb (54 kg))

The WWE Cruiserweight Championship was a professional wrestling championship originally used in World Championship Wrestling (WCW) and later, World Wrestling Federation/Entertainment (WWF/WWE). It was contested by wrestlers under 220 lbs, billed as cruiserweights. Following the acquisition of WCW by the then-WWF in 2001, it became a WWF (and later, WWE) championship and replaced the WWF Light Heavyweight Championship. During the first WWE brand extension, it was the only title to be exclusive to the SmackDown! brand during its entire tenure.

The championship was created in WCW in 1996, with Shinjiro Otani as the inaugural champion. However, following WCW's purchase, the WWF/E considered the title to be a continuation of the earlier WCW Light Heavyweight Championship, which had been created in 1991 with Brian Pillman as the inaugural champion. The WWE Cruiserweight Championship was retired in 2007 with Hornswoggle as its final holder.

Another WWE Cruiserweight Championship was created in 2016, and although both championships had shared the same name (before the newer title was renamed to NXT Cruiserweight Championship in 2019), the newer championship did not carry the lineage of the original. The newer title also had a different weight limit of 205 lbs (93 kg) before the championship was retired in 2022.

== History ==
The championship was originally created as the WCW Cruiserweight Championship on March 20, 1996. However, after the acquisition of World Championship Wrestling's (WCW) assets by rival company World Wrestling Federation (WWF, now WWE), both lineages of the WCW Light Heavyweight Championship and the WCW Cruiserweight Championship were considered to be one and the same, with WWE referring to the holders of the Light Heavyweight Championship as former Cruiserweight Champions. During the existence of WCW, the two titles were considered distinct and did not share a common lineage.

Following the introduction of the Light Heavyweight Championship in 1991 (which WCW had considered to be a separate title), a tournament was held to determine the inaugural champion. On October 27, Brian Pillman defeated Richard Morton in the tournament final to win the title. However, when Brad Armstrong was forced to relinquish the title due to injury on September 2, 1992, it became inactive. Then, on March 20, 1996, Shinjiro Otani defeated Wild Pegasus (Chris Benoit) in a decision match to win what then became known as the WCW Cruiserweight Championship.

In March 2001, the WWF purchased WCW. Soon after, "The Invasion" took place, in which The Alliance was ultimately dismantled. Following the Survivor Series pay-per-view in November 2001, the title was renamed the WWF Cruiserweight Championship, replacing the WWF Light Heavyweight Championship. After the introduction of the brand extension in March 2002, the championship became exclusive to the SmackDown! brand. The title was then renamed as the WWE Cruiserweight Championship after the WWF was renamed to World Wrestling Entertainment (WWE) in May that same year. Around 2004, WWE began referring to the title as the "Cruiserweight Championship of the World", but the official name of the title was not changed to reflect this.

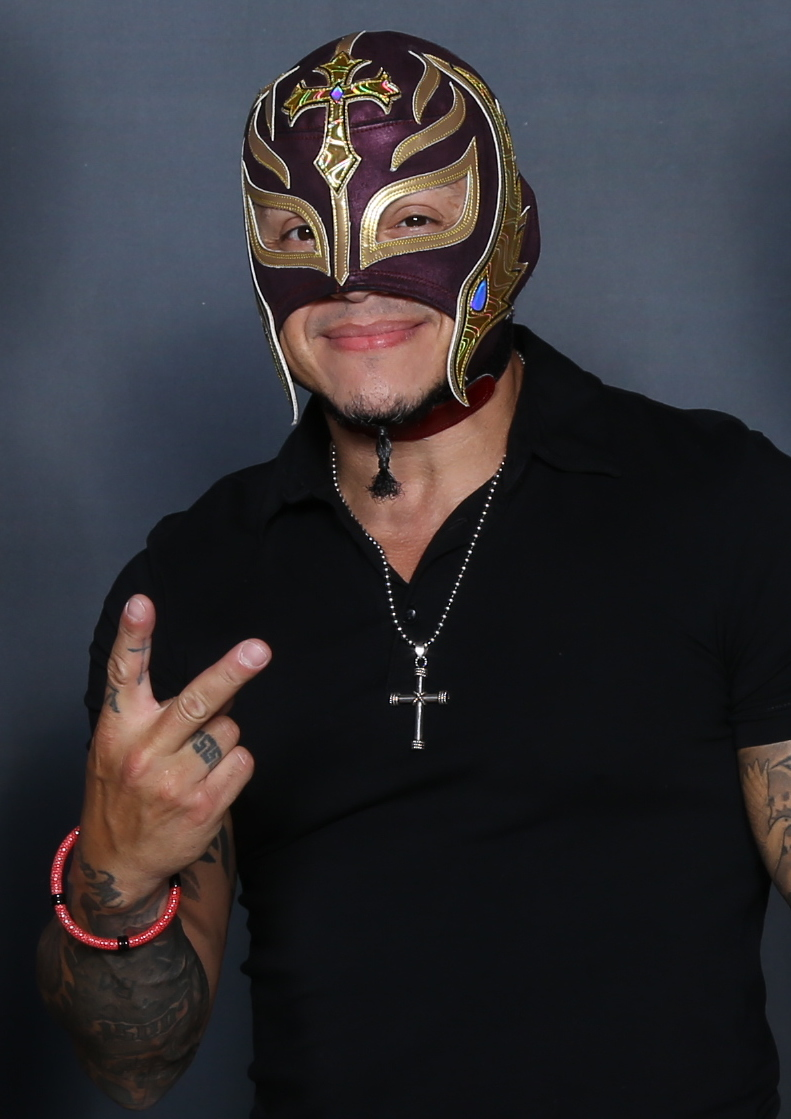
Between his time in WCW and WWE, Rey Mysterio won the title a record-breaking 8 times

On September 28, 2007, the title was vacated after the final champion, Hornswoggle, was stripped of the championship by SmackDown! General Manager, Vickie Guerrero. Hornswoggle had won the championship in a Cruiserweight Open at that year's The Great American Bash pay-per-view event. The last match contested for the title occurred on the September 7, 2007, episode of SmackDown!, where Hornswoggle successfully defeated Jamie Noble by count out to retain the championship.

After a six-month absence, WWE removed the championship from the active championship web page to the defunct championship list. In this way, the title was quietly retired. WWE lists its retirement year as 2007.

== Brand designation history ==
Following the introduction of the brand split on March 25, 2002, all titles in WWE became exclusive to either the Raw or SmackDown! brand.

Date of transition	Brand	Notes
March 25, 2002	SmackDown!	Tajiri was drafted to SmackDown! as the Cruiserweight Champion, taking the championship with him in the process.

== Belt design ==
The original design of the title has a blue with gold imprinting of the earth in the middle with the word world above it in the center plate that's gold squarely surrounded by the color black, It also has the word wrestling champions under the blue earth in that same way. It also has the word cruiserweight in the middle that's gold and the center with a circle-ish red surrounding it in the center of the earth and the side plates are a square-ish gold with the WCW Logos on the side that are a thick red with one extra side plate on the right side that's smaller than them all. All of the plates on the title are gold mainly with indented designs, colors & wordings.

The 2002–2007 design of the title is similar to the first but with 4 side plates minus an earth in the middle and WWE Logos on the side plates (On two only closest to the center plate minus the two out-ist) and in the middle plate at the top.

== Reigns ==
Gregory Helms' third reign was the longest reign at 385 days (384 days as recognized by WWE). Helms won the championship at the 2006 Royal Rumble in a Cruiserweight Open, despite originally being a member of the Raw brand; he transferred to SmackDown! in conjunction with winning the title. He lost it in a Cruiserweight Open at No Way Out in 2007, thirteen months later, to Chavo Guerrero. Psicosis had the shortest title reign, holding it for approximately one hour. Rey Mysterio Jr. had the most reigns at eight, spread across both WCW and WWE (five reigns in WCW and three in WWE). Three women held the championship; Madusa and Daffney both had reigns in WCW, while Jacqueline was the only woman to win it after it became a WWE championship.

== See also ==
- NWA World Junior Heavyweight Championship, predecessor in Jim Crockett Promotions
