= Prince Iaukea =

American professional wrestler (born 1964)

Personal information
- Born: Michael Laauli Hayner; August 1, 1964 (age 61) Honolulu, Hawaii, U.S.

Professional wrestling career
- Ring name(s): The Artist; Mike Hayner; Prince Iaukea; The Tongan Prince
- Billed height: 5 ft 11 in (1.80 m)
- Billed weight: 219 lb (99 kg)
- Billed from: Honolulu, Hawaii "The Kingdom of Tonga"
- Trained by: Boris Malenko; Dean Malenko; Rico Federico
- Debut: 1995
- Retired: 2015

Michael Laauli Hayner (born August 1, 1964) is an American semi-retired professional wrestler. He is best known for his appearances with World Championship Wrestling from 1995 to 2000 under the ring name Prince Iaukea and later The Artist Formerly Known as Prince Iaukea or simply The Artist.

Hayner made his WCW debut in 1996 and mainly competed as a fan favorite underdog. He was utilized as an enhancement talent during the early months of his career before winning the World Television Championship in 1997 and holding the title for nearly two months. Hayner then fell in the ranks due to some issues with management before being repackaged as "The Artist". He dominated the cruiserweight division during the first half of 2000, winning the company's Cruiserweight Championship twice before departing the company later that year.

== Professional wrestling career ==
=== World Championship Wrestling (1995-2000) ===
==== Training and debut (1995–1996) ====
After being trained by Dean Malenko and Rico Federico, Hayner made his first appearance in World Championship Wrestling (WCW) at the 1995 Fall Brawl pay-per-view as a cadet delivering papers to Cobra for Craig Pittman. Later, Kevin Sullivan brought him to some television tapings and was so impressed by his professionalism, overall attitude, and respect for the business that Sullivan gave him the "Iaukea" name taken from King Curtis Iaukea, a good friend of Sullivan. Hayner was thus given the ring name "Prince Iaukea".

Hayner made his first appearance in WCW on the May 18, 1996 episode of Saturday Night, where he teamed with Rick Fargo as enhancement talents against Chris Benoit and Kevin Sullivan. He made his official television debut as the fan favorite "Prince Iaukea" on the June 1 episode of Saturday Night, where he defeated The Gambler. Two days later, Iaukea made his Monday Nitro debut with a loss to Kevin Sullivan and then remained a jobber to the stars for the remainder of the year. He made his pay-per-view debut at November's World War 3 as a participant in the World War 3 battle royal for a future title shot at the WCW World Heavyweight Championship, but failed to win. He quickly made a name for himself with his unique Samoan persona and real submission wrestling skills along with solid pro wrestling ability. The common pronunciation of his ring name came about by the mispronunciation from WCW announcer Tony Schiavone. Prince Iaukea also received blessing from King Curtis Iaukea during a phone conversation with King Curtis telling him that "he was family" and that he enjoyed the work that Prince was doing.

==== World Television Champion (1997–1998) ====
On the February 17, 1997 episode of Nitro, Iaukea captured the World Television Championship by defeating Lord Steven Regal after capitalizing on a distraction caused by Regal's scheduled pay-per-view opponent Rey Misterio, Jr. Iaukea successfully defended the title against Misterio, six days later at February's SuperBrawl VII and Uncensored. Iaukea began feuding with Regal and made a successful title defense against Regal at Spring Stampede, but was assaulted by Regal after the match. The following night, on Nitro, Iaukea attempted to rescue Misterio from an assault by Regal but ended up suffering a Regal Stretch and suffered a rib injury, leading him to drop the title to Último Dragón later that night. After his title loss, Iaukea received a title shot against Syxx for the Cruiserweight Championship and unsuccessfully tried to regain the World Television Championship from Lord Steven Regal on the May 19 episode of Nitro and Último Dragón on the July 28 episode of Nitro.

Hayner continued to compete as a mid-carder before going on tour with WCW's working partner New Japan Pro-Wrestling (NJPW) during the month of October, where he competed with established greats such as Shinjiro Otani and Koji Kanemoto. NJPW booker Riki Choshu was a huge supporter of Hayner. Hayner returned to WCW television as a participant in the World War 3 at the eponymous pay-per-view on November 23. He would then float around the lower mid-card for several years, mainly because of an alleged romantic link between Hayner and the wife of an upper level WCW executive. Hayner denied the allegations, but the rumor persisted.

He briefly feuded with Chris Jericho in early 1998 due to Jericho degrading Hayner's trainer Dean Malenko and Hayner stepped in to defend Malenko's honor. He unsuccessfully challenged Jericho for the Cruiserweight Championship at Spring Stampede. After the match, Jericho stole Iaukea's Hawaiian dress. He went on a hiatus and returned to the company on the October 8 episode of Thunder against Kanyon in a losing effort. He then lost to Norman Smiley at the company's premier pay-per-view Starrcade on December 27, 1998.

==== The Artist and Cruiserweight Champion (1999–2000) ====
After spending most of 1999 as a low-carder and being left off pay-per-view events, Hayner was repackaged as a villain on the December 6, 1999 episode of Monday Nitro as "The Artist Formerly Known as Prince Iaukea", a character based on singer Prince. He was soon then given a valet named Paisley and his ring name was shortened to simply "The Artist". In 2000, the Artist entered a tournament for the vacant Cruiserweight Championship. He defeated Kid Romeo, Kaz Hayashi and Lash LeRoux at SuperBrawl 2000 to win the vacant title. the Artist successfully defended the title against Psychosis at the following month's Uncensored pay-per-view, before losing the title to Billy Kidman at a live event on March 30, only to regain it from Kidman on March 31. All of the WCW titles were vacated by Vince Russo on April 10 when Russo and Eric Bischoff "re-launched" WCW.

The Artist was then placed in a six-way match for the vacant title at Spring Stampede, in which he was pinned by Chris Candido. As a result, the Artist began a rivalry with Candido and received a title shot at Slamboree, where he failed to win the title. This would be Hayner's last pay-per-view appearance in the company. Hayner was released in August 2000, his last televised match being a loss to Big Vito on the August 19 episode of WorldWide.

=== Independent circuit (2000–2015) ===
Following his WCW release he wrestled the independent scene traveling around the country for various promotions. He was briefly known as The Tongan Prince for Jimmy Hart's X Wrestling Federation, but when that went under he used his military background and went to work for a security contractor overseas. In 2007 he started 3SX Entertainment (Samoan Strong Style Xtreme Wrestling and Entertainment) in American Samoa where work on a Pro Wrestling and MMA Dojo was ongoing.

He won the NWA Florida Junior Heavyweight title of the Floridan promotion Pro Wrestling Fusion by defeating Chris Jones on November 29, 2008, and held it for six months before losing it back to Chris Jones. He rebounded and received a Heavyweight title match against Steve Madison which he lost.

Iaukea's last match to date took place with NWA Florida Wrestling Alliance on October 17, 2015, unsuccessfully challenging Big O for the Great Malenko Cup.

== Other media ==
Hayner appeared as "Prince Iaukea" alongside several other WCW wrestlers in the 2000 movie Ready to Rumble.

== Personal life ==
Hayner was married to Georgette and has a son who wrestles professionally under the name of Nick Primo. Hayner and his son both currently work for Pro Wrestling Fusion, New Florida Wrestling (NFW), and Definitive Wrestling International (DWI); all are Florida based independent wrestling promotions.

== Championships and accomplishments ==
- Pro Wrestling Eklipse
  - PWE Heavyweight Championship (1 time)
- Pro Wrestling Fusion
  - NWA Florida Junior Heavyweight Championship (1 time)
- Pro Wrestling Illustrated
  - PWI Rookie of the Year (1997)
  - PWI ranked him #92 of the top 500 best singles wrestlers in the "PWI 500" in 2000
  - PWI ranked him #495 of the 500 best singles wrestlers during the "PWI Years" in 2003
- World Championship Wrestling
  - WCW Cruiserweight Championship (2 times)
  - WCW World Television Championship (1 time)
  - WCW Cruiserweight Championship Tournament (2000)
- Other titles
  - eXtreme Japan World Championship (2 times)
  - FXCW World Championship (2 times)
  - GPCW World Championship (3 times)
  - IWF InterNational Championship (1 time)
