= Spring Stampede (1999) =

1999 World Championship Wrestling pay-per-view event

- Promotion: World Championship Wrestling
- Date: April 11, 1999
- City: Tacoma, Washington
- Venue: Tacoma Dome
- Attendance: 17,690
- Buy rate: 255,000
- Tagline: The Good. The Bad. The Showdown.

Pay-per-view chronology
← Previous; Uncensored	Next → Slamboree

Spring Stampede chronology
← Previous; 1998	Next → 2000

The 1999 Spring Stampede was a professional wrestling pay-per-view event produced by World Championship Wrestling (WCW) on April 11, 1999 at the Tacoma Dome in Tacoma, Washington. It was the fourth event in the Spring Stampede chronology. In the main event, Diamond Dallas Page won the WCW World Heavyweight Championship by defeating champion Ric Flair, Hollywood Hogan, Sting in a Four Corners match, with Randy Savage serving as the guest referee. On the undercard, Scott Steiner defeated Booker T to win the vacant WCW United States Heavyweight Championship, Goldberg defeated Kevin Nash while Horsemen Chris Benoit and Dean Malenko defeated Raven and Perry Saturn.

The show was very well received by critics and wrestling fans alike, particularly the Juventud Guerrera vs Blitzkrieg opening match; it is also considered by many wrestling fans and critics as the last well received pay-per-view that WCW produced. In addition, this is the first pay-per-view event to feature the new WCW logo after the previous one was retired six days before.

Diamond Dallas Page versus Sting versus Hollywood Hulk Hogan versus Ric Flair was included on the 2012 WWE DVD and Blu-ray release The 50 Greatest Finishing Moves in WWE History and the 2017 WWE DVD and Blu-ray release Diamond Dallas Page: Positively Living. Goldberg versus Kevin Nash was included on the 2013 WWE DVD and Blu-ray release Goldberg: The Ultimate Collection.

== Storylines ==
The event involved wrestlers from pre-existing scripted feuds and storylines. Wrestlers portrayed villains or heroes in the scripted events that built tension and culminated in a wrestling match or series of matches.

Other on-screen personnel
Role:	Name:
Commentators	Tony Schiavone
Commentators	Bobby Heenan
Commentators	Mike Tenay
Interviewer	Gene Okerlund
Ring announcers	Michael Buffer
Ring announcers	David Penzer
Referees	Randy Anderson
Referees	Johnny Boone
Referees	Scott Dickinson
Referees	Mickie Jay
Referees	Charles Robinson
Referees	Billy Silverman

== Reception ==
The event has received mostly positive reviews from critics.

In 2013, Dylan Diot of 411Mania gave the event a rating of 7.0 [Good], stating, "Many people have praised this as one of WCW's best shows and one of if not THE best show of 1999. I don't think it holds up quite as well looking back, but it is still a good show. The wrestling itself was very good but weird finishes and some questionable booking left a bad taste in my mouth. I'll definitely recommend the show cause it is easy to watch and has some really good wrestling but I won't put it as an all-time great WCW show."

In 2020, Thomas Hall of Wrestling Rumors gave the event a rating of B+, stating, "This was one of the best shows WCW has put on in years. Even the main event wasn’t bad! There are two really good matches on here which make the show more than worth checking out and the only bad match is about seven minutes long. Things are about to implode for WCW and this might have been the last really good, bordering on great, show that they had left."

In 2021, Lance Augustine of TJR Wrestling gave the event a rating of 7/10, stating, "I thought this show was very good from start to finish. There were a lot of familiar matchups, but also some fresh ones to give some variety. Obviously, you had some throwaway stuff, but for the most part, this show delivered. The opening Cruiserweight match was awesome, and I liked Booker vs. Steiner a lot as well. WCW had a knack for underdelivering in the big moments, although, they rebounded nicely here. Page winning the title was awesome, and I think he should have gotten it way before this. This is about the time where the train came off the tracks, and this would be one of the last times we would see a quality show from WCW. Sure, they had matches that stood out after this, but I feel like this may be one of their final good shows overall."

The event generated 255,000 PPV buys.

== Results ==
No.	Results	Stipulations	Times
1	Juventud Guerrera defeated Blitzkrieg	Singles match	11:11
2	Bam Bam Bigelow defeated Hak (with Chastity)	Hardcore match	11:33
3	Scotty Riggs defeated Mikey Whipwreck	Singles match	07:03
4	Konnan defeated Disco Inferno	Singles match	09:17
5	Rey Mysterio Jr. (c) defeated Billy Kidman	Singles match for the WCW Cruiserweight Championship	15:32
6	Chris Benoit and Dean Malenko (with Arn Anderson) defeated Raven and Perry Saturn	Tag team match	14:11
7	Scott Steiner defeated Booker T	Singles match for the vacant WCW United States Heavyweight Championship	16:00
8	Goldberg defeated Kevin Nash (with Lex Luger and Miss Elizabeth)	Singles match	07:44
9	Diamond Dallas Page defeated Ric Flair (c), Hollywood Hogan and Sting	Four Corners match for the WCW World Heavyweight Championship with Randy Savage as special guest referee	17:27
(c) / – the champion(s) heading into the match
