= Spring Stampede (1997) =

1997 World Championship Wrestling pay-per-view event

- Promotional poster featuring The Four Horsemen
- Promotion: World Championship Wrestling
- Date: April 6, 1997
- City: Tupelo, Mississippi
- Venue: Tupelo Coliseum
- Attendance: 8,356
- Buy rate: 210,000
- Tagline: These Men Do Solemnly Swear... to Kick, Fight, Punch, Stomp, and Flatten anybody who gets in their way!

Pay-per-view chronology
← Previous; Uncensored	Next → Slamboree

Spring Stampede chronology
← Previous; 1994	Next → 1998

The 1997 Spring Stampede was the second Spring Stampede pay-per-view (PPV) event scripted and produced by World Championship Wrestling (WCW). The event took place on April 6, 1997 from the Tupelo Coliseum in Tupelo, Mississippi.

The main event was a no disqualification match between Randy Savage and Diamond Dallas Page, which Page won. Other featured matches on the undercard were a Four Corners match between Lex Luger, The Giant, Booker T and Stevie Ray. What was originally scheduled to be a tag team match between The Outsiders and The Steiner Brothers for the WCW World Tag Team Championship, became a singles match between Kevin Nash and Rick Steiner as a result of Scott Hall no-showing the event. WCW presented a storyline that showed Scott Steiner being maced and arrested earlier in the evening to explain why the scheduled match was changed.

The event is known for the infamous Harlem Heat's botched promo, in which Booker T accidentally calls Hulk Hogan "nigga".

== Background ==
=== Production ===
The first Spring Stampede event was held in April 1994, the first time World Championship Wrestling (WCW) held a pay-per-view (PPV) in April as they expanded their PPV schedule. The event did not return in 1995 or 1996 but was brought back in 1997 on April 6. The "Spring Stampede" name would be used three more times, 1998, 1999 and 2000, before WCW closed in March 2001. All WCW intellectual property was sold to WWE at that time, and with the launch of the WWE Network in 2014 all five Spring Stampede events became available to subscribers.

All of the Spring Stampede events had a cowboy or Wild West theme, reflected both in the opening montage, posters and entrance set decorations. The 1997 event was held at the Tupelo Coliseum in Tupelo, Mississippi. WCW had previously held both the 1995 Uncensored, and 1996 Uncensored PPVs at the Tupelo Coliseum, but did not use it for any subsequent PPVs. The promotional poster for the event featured The Four Horsemen (Arn Anderson, Steve McMichael, Ric Flair and Chris Benoit), with the tagline "'These Men Do Solemnly Swear... to Kick, Fight, Punch, Stomp, and Flatten anybody who gets in their way!'". Neither Ric Flair, nor Arn Anderson competed in any matches at the event.

=== Storylines ===
The event featured wrestlers from pre-existing scripted feuds and storylines. Wrestlers portrayed villains, heroes, or less distinguishable characters in the scripted events that built tension and culminated in a wrestling match or series of matches.

Other on-screen personnel
Role:	Name:
Commentators	Tony Schiavone
Commentators	Bobby Heenan
Commentators	Dusty Rhodes
Commentators	Mike Tenay
Interviewers	Gene Okerlund
Interviewers	Lee Marshall
Ring announcers	David Penzer
Ring announcers	Michael Buffer
Refereed	Randy Anderson
Refereed	Mark Curtis
Refereed	Mickie Jay
Refereed	Nick Patrick

== Results ==
No.	Results	Stipulations	Times
1	Rey Misterio Jr. defeated Ultimate Dragon	Singles match	14:55
2	Akira Hokuto (c) (with Sonny Onoo) defeated Madusa	Singles match for the WCW Women's Championship	05:14
3	Prince Iaukea (c) defeated Lord Steven Regal	Singles match for the WCW World Television Championship	10:00
4	The Public Enemy (Rocco Rock and Johnny Grunge) defeated Steve McMichael and Jeff Jarrett (with Debra)	Tag team match	10:42
5	Dean Malenko (c) vs. Chris Benoit (with Woman) ended in a no contest	Singles match for the WCW United States Heavyweight Championship	17:53
6	Kevin Nash (c) (with Syxx and Ted DiBiase) defeated Rick Steiner	Singles match for the WCW World Tag Team Championship	10:25
7	Lex Luger defeated The Giant, Booker T and Stevie Ray (Note: Both Stevie Ray and Booker T were both accompanied by Sister Sherri.)	Four Corners match to determine the #1 contender for the WCW World Heavyweight Championship	18:18
8	Diamond Dallas Page (with Kimberly Page) defeated Randy Savage (with Miss Elizabeth)	No Disqualification match	15:38
(c) / – the champion(s) heading into the match

== Aftermath ==
Lex Luger received his title shot against Hollywood Hogan for the WCW World Heavyweight Championship on the hundredth episode of Monday Nitro on August 4, where he defeated Hogan to win the title which bring a massive celebration with WCW wrestlers in the ring. However, Luger lost the title back to Hogan at Road Wild.
