= Spring Stampede (1998) =

1998 World Championship Wrestling pay-per-view event

- Promotion: World Championship Wrestling
- Brand(s): WCW nWo
- Date: April 19, 1998
- City: Denver, Colorado
- Venue: Denver Coliseum
- Attendance: 7,428
- Buy rate: 275,000
- Tagline: The Biggest, the Baddest, No Bull.

Pay-per-view chronology
| ← Previous; Uncensored | Next → Slamboree |

Spring Stampede chronology
| ← Previous; 1997 | Next → 1999 |

The 1998 Spring Stampede was the third Spring Stampede pay-per-view (PPV) event produced by World Championship Wrestling (WCW). The event took place on April 19, 1998 from the Denver Coliseum in Denver, Colorado. The main event was a no disqualification match between Sting and Randy Savage for the WCW World Heavyweight Championship.

Featured matches on the undercard were Diamond Dallas Page versus Raven in a Raven's Rules match for the WCW United States Heavyweight Championship, Hollywood Hogan and Kevin Nash versus Roddy Piper and The Giant in a Baseball Bat on a Pole match and Lex Luger and Rick Steiner versus Scott Steiner and Buff Bagwell in a tag team match.

The event generated 275,000 ppv buys.

== Storylines ==
The event featured wrestlers from pre-existing scripted feuds and storylines. Wrestlers portrayed villains, heroes, or less distinguishable characters in the scripted events that built tension and culminated in a wrestling match or series of matches.

One of the major storylines entering Spring Stampede was the continued fracturing of the New World Order. Tensions between Hollywood Hogan and Randy Savage had been building for weeks, and seemed to have reached a breaking point at SuperBrawl VIII in February. In his match against Lex Luger, Savage had to fight off an attack from several nWo members at Hogan's behest. Savage retaliated by costing Hogan his match with Sting for the vacant WCW World Heavyweight Championship in the main event. The two met at Uncensored in March in a steel cage match that went to a no-contest, after which Savage declared on Nitro that he intended to take the title from Sting and take over leadership of the nWo from Hogan. The two would face Sting and Luger in the main event of the program, which ended in a disqualification and resulted in a brawl between Hogan and Savage at the end of the night.

Hogan was also having problems with Kevin Nash, stemming from various mishaps between the two and the firing of Syxx from WCW earlier in the year. The two were signed to face Roddy Piper and The Giant in a match at Spring Stampede where a metal baseball bat would be hung from a pole and could be used once grabbed.

Other on-screen personnel
| Role: | Name: |
|---|---|
| Commentators | Tony Schiavone |
| Commentators | Bobby Heenan |
| Commentators | Mike Tenay |
| Interviewer | Gene Okerlund |
| Ring announcers | Michael Buffer |
| Ring announcers | David Penzer |
| Referees | Mickie Henson |
| Referees | Charles Robinson |
| Referees | Nick Patrick |
| Referees | Billy Silverman |

== Reception ==
In 2016, Kevin Pantoja of 411Mania gave the event a rating of 4.5 [Poor], stating, "There was certainly some potential on this show. The Television Title, United States Title and Chavo/Ultimo Dragon matches were good stuff. Most of the event was filled with the classic WCW overbooking and referee bumps. There were a few matches that were absolutely dreadful, but there are some things worth a look. Check out the matches I mentioned and skip the rest."

== Results ==
| No. | Results | Stipulations | Times |
|---|---|---|---|
| 1 | Goldberg defeated Perry Saturn (with Kidman) | Singles match | 08:10 |
| 2 | Último Dragón defeated Chavo Guerrero Jr. (with Eddie Guerrero) | Singles match | 11:49 |
| 3 | Booker T (c) defeated Chris Benoit | Singles match for the WCW World Television Championship | 14:11 |
| 4 | Curt Hennig (with Rick Rude) defeated The British Bulldog (with Jim Neidhart) | Singles match | 04:48 |
| 5 | Chris Jericho (c) defeated Prince Iaukea | Singles match for the WCW Cruiserweight Championship | 09:55 |
| 6 | Rick Steiner and Lex Luger defeated Scott Steiner and Buff Bagwell | Tag team match | 05:58 |
| 7 | Psychosis defeated La Parka | Singles match | 06:59 |
| 8 | Hollywood Hogan and Kevin Nash defeated Roddy Piper and The Giant | Baseball Bat on a Pole match | 13:23 |
| 9 | Raven defeated Diamond Dallas Page (c) | Raven's Rules match for the WCW United States Heavyweight Championship | 11:52 |
| 10 | Randy Savage (with Miss Elizabeth) defeated Sting (c) | No Disqualification match for the WCW World Heavyweight Championship | 10:08 |
(c) / – the champion(s) heading into the match
