= Spring Stampede =

Professional wrestling pay-per-view event

- Promotions: World Championship Wrestling
- First event: Spring Stampede (1994)
- Last event: Spring Stampede (2000)

Spring Stampede was a professional wrestling pay-per-view (PPV) event from World Championship Wrestling (WCW) held in the month of April in 1994 and then from 1997 to 2000. As it was called Spring Stampede, the event was usually Cowboy/Wild West themed. Since 2001, WWE owns the rights to the Spring Stampede event. In 2014, all WCW pay-per-views were made available on the WWE Network.

== Dates, venues, and main events ==
WCW/nWo co-branded event

Event	Date	City	Venue	Main event(s)
Spring Stampede (1994)	April 17, 1994	Chicago, Illinois	Rosemont Horizon	Ric Flair (c) vs. Ricky Steamboat for the WCW World Heavyweight Championship
Spring Stampede (1997)	April 6, 1997	Tupelo, Mississippi	Tupelo Coliseum	Diamond Dallas Page vs. Randy Savage in a No Disqualification match
Spring Stampede (1998)	April 19, 1998	Denver, Colorado	Denver Coliseum	Sting (c) vs. Randy Savage in a No Disqualification match for the WCW World Heavyweight Championship
Spring Stampede (1999)	April 11, 1999	Tacoma, Washington	Tacoma Dome	Ric Flair (c) vs. Hollywood Hogan vs. Sting vs. Diamond Dallas Page in a Four Corners match for the WCW World Heavyweight Championship with Randy Savage as special guest referee
Spring Stampede (2000)	April 16, 2000	Chicago, Illinois	United Center	Diamond Dallas Page vs. Jeff Jarrett for the vacant WCW World Heavyweight Championship
(c) – refers to the champion(s) heading into the match
