= William Regal =

English professional wrestler (born 1968)

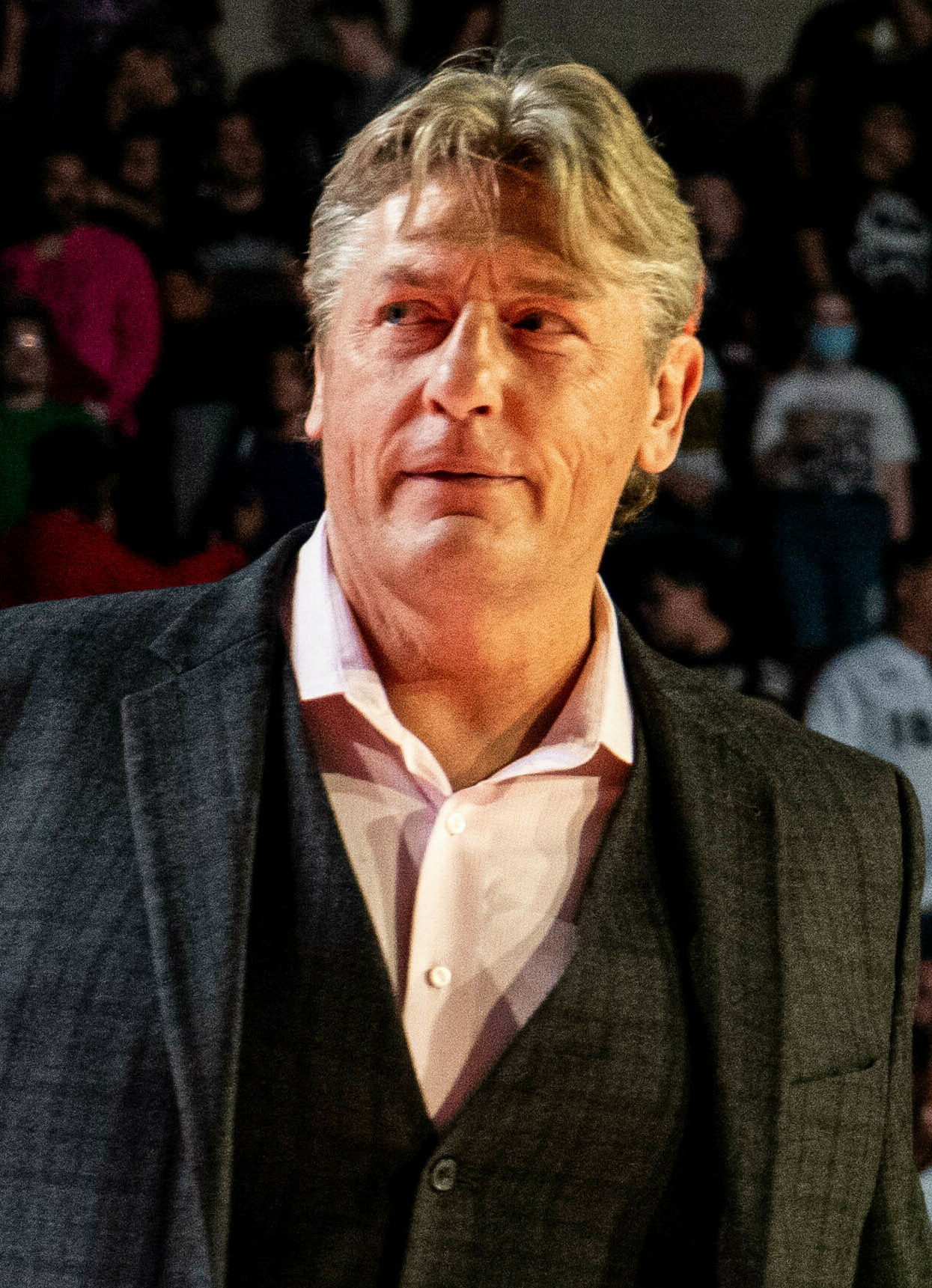
- Regal in 2022
- Born: Darren Kenneth Matthews; 10 May 1968 (age 58); Codsall, Staffordshire, England
- Spouse: Christina Beddoes (m. 1986)
- Children: 3; including Charlie Dempsey
- Professional wrestling career
- Ring names: Darren Matthews; Hellraiser; King Regal; Lord Regal; Lord Steven Regal; Mr. Regal; Roy Regal; Sir William Regal; Steve Jones; Steve Regal; Steven Regal; Steven William Regal; William Regal
- Billed height: 6 ft 3 in (191 cm)
- Billed weight: 243 lb (110 kg)
- Billed from: Blackpool, England
- Trained by: Marty Jones
- Debut: 1983
- Retired: 25 December 2013

Darren Kenneth Matthews (born 10 May 1968), better known by the ring name William Regal, is an English retired professional wrestler. He is signed to WWE, where he serves as the vice-president of Global Talent Development. He is also known for his tenures in World Championship Wrestling (WCW) and All Elite Wrestling (AEW), having served as a manager in the latter promotion.

Trained by Marty Jones, Matthews started his career at the age of 15 in 1983. His first matches took place at one of the rare final wrestling carnival booths at Blackpool Pleasure Beach. He went on to wrestle for national promotions on the British wrestling circuit and wrestled on television for ITV. He then progressed to touring around the world until 1993 when he was signed to WCW, where he took the ring name Steven Regal and became a four-time WCW World Television Champion.

In 1998, Matthews joined the WWF (later WWE), where he became a two-time Intercontinental Champion, a five-time Hardcore Champion, a four-time European Champion, a four-time World Tag Team Champion, and the 2008 winner of the King of the Ring tournament. He also had stints as on-screen authority figures such as commissioner, General Manager of Raw, and match co-ordinator for the 2011 season of the original NXT. As NXT became WWE's developmental brand in 2012, he appeared as the on-screen General Manager; behind the scenes, he began serving as WWE's Director of Talent Development and Head of Global Recruiting from 2018 until he was released in 2022. He then signed with AEW and debuted as the founder and manager of the Blackpool Combat Club, leaving the company nine months later to return to WWE as the vice-president of Global Talent Development.

== Early life ==
Darren Kenneth Matthews was born in Codsall on 10 May 1968. He grew up admiring wrestlers Terry Rudge and Jon Cortez, whom he later called "wrestlers' wrestlers".

== Professional wrestling career ==
=== Early years (1983–1992) ===
After training under Marty Jones, Matthews made his debut wrestling for promoter Bobby Barron at his wrestling challenge booth at the Horseshoe Showbar at Blackpool Pleasure Beach at the age of 15. In time, he graduated to be a shooter at the booth, using brutal submission holds to defend prize money against challenges from members of the public. By this time, he wrestled professionally all over Britain for All Star Wrestling where he regularly teamed with Robbie Brookside as The Golden Boys tag team. Both Regal and Brookside appeared in several televised matches during the final years (1987–1988) of ITV's coverage of British wrestling.

Matthews went on to tour worldwide, including Germany and South Africa. In 1991, he received a tryout match with the World Wrestling Federation. Matthews relayed that through Lord Alfred Hayes, WWF had become interested in seeing the young wrestler and offered him an opportunity at the WWF UK Rampage Show on 24 April 1991. Wrestling in a dark match, he appeared as Steve Regal and teamed with Dave Taylor and Tony St. Clair to defeat Drew McDonald, Chic Cullen, & Johnny South. Later that year, he received a second booking and wrestled Brian Maxine at the Battle Royal at Albert Hall in London, England on 3 October 1991. Two months later, Matthews was again wrestling on the UK swing of a major American promotion, although this time it was World Championship Wrestling. Appearing as Steve Regal, he wrestled six matches on WCW's tour of the United Kingdom and faced Terrance Taylor, Jimmy Garvin, Giant Haystacks, and Oz (Kevin Nash).

During this early period, he was billed as Steve Regal, a name he saw in an American wrestling magazine (in use by "Mr. Electricity" Steve Regal). There were two exceptions to this. One was when he wrestled in Wales during this period, including appearances on S4C's Welsh language wrestling TV show Reslo under the name Steve Jones and was billed from Cardiff, Wales, teaming with Orig Williams and faced Fit Finlay among others. The other was a brief stint for Joint Promotions in 1986 where he wrestled his first two televised matches under the name Roy Regal. Otherwise, he stuck with the name Steve Regal up until shortly after his arrival in World Championship Wrestling.

=== World Championship Wrestling (1992–1998) ===
==== World Television Champion (1993–1994) ====
In the fall of 1992, Matthews reached out to Bill Watts on a position in World Championship Wrestling (WCW). Watts responded favourably to Regal's letter and offered him a contract. He began as a fan favourite character, still as Steve Regal. Regal made his televised debut on the 30 January 1993 episode of Saturday Night and defeated enhancement talent Bob Cook in his in-ring debut on the following week's Saturday Night. Shortly after his debut, Regal entered a tournament for the vacant WCW World Television Championship in which he defeated The Barbarian in the first round before losing to Johnny B. Badd in the quarterfinals.

He became the villain "Lord Steven Regal" on the 12 June episode of Saturday Night, claiming descent from William the Conqueror. Sir William began serving as his manager. At times arrogantly charming in this persona, one of his memorable statements to a post-match interviewer was: "Do you know what my New Year's resolution is going to be? To wake up a half an hour earlier so I can hate you more". His first major win after the character change was against Marcus Alexander Bagwell on 16 June Clash of the Champions XXIII. Regal was scheduled to face Bagwell's partner 2 Cold Scorpio on 18 August Clash of the Champions XXIV, but he was replaced by Bobby Eaton. Regal himself substituted for the injured Brian Pillman to team with Steve Austin in a WCW World Tag Team Championship defence against Arn Anderson and Paul Roma; Regal and Austin lost that match.

Regal won the World Television Championship by defeating Ricky Steamboat at the Fall Brawl '93: War Games pay-per-view on 18 September with the help of Sir William. Regal unknowingly broke his neck during this match. Regal enjoyed a lengthy title reign as he retained the title against a flurry of challengers, beginning with his first televised title defence against Arn Anderson on the 9 October episode of Saturday Night which ended in a fifteen-minute time limit draw. He then defended the title against fellow Briton Davey Boy Smith, whom he faced to a fifteen-minute time limit draw at Halloween Havoc. Regal then successfully retained the title against Johnny B. Badd on 10 November Clash of the Champions XXV and retained the title against Steamboat at Starrcade '93: 10th Anniversary and Dustin Rhodes on 27 January 1994 Clash of the Champions XXVI, with both matches ending in time limit draws. Regal continued his successful title defences in 1994 by beating Arn Anderson at SuperBrawl IV and fighting a time limit draw against Brian Pillman at Spring Stampede. In the spring of 1994 on WCW WorldWide, Regal challenged Ric Flair to a best-of-five series under Marquess of Queensberry Rules in which Regal lost to Flair with 1 win, 2 losses and 2 draws.

The following month, Regal lost a non-title match to Larry Zbyszko at Slamboree '94: A Legends' Reunion, leading to a title match on the 28 May episode of Saturday Night, in which he dropped the title to Zbyszko. Regal regained the title from Zbyszko on 23 June Clash of the Champions XXVII. Regal began a feud with Sting and was booked to defend the title against Sting at Bash at the Beach. However, Sting was injured prior to the event and was replaced by Johnny B. Badd, whom Regal defeated to retain the title at Bash at the Beach. Regal lost to the wrestling legend Antonio Inoki on 28 August Clash of the Champions XXVIII. In September, Regal lost the title to Badd at Fall Brawl '94: War Games.

==== The Blue Bloods (1994–1998) ====
Shortly after losing the television title to Badd, Regal dropped Sir William as his manager (Dundee was fired from WCW due to a contract dispute). Beginning with the 26 November episode of Saturday Night, Regal began scouting fellow aristocrat Jean-Paul Levesque during his matches, which lead to the duo forming a tag team on the 21 January 1995 episode of Pro, when they defeated Brad and Scott Armstrong. Shortly after, Levesque left WCW and he was replaced by Alabama-born Bobby Eaton when Regal and Eaton faced each other in a match on the 18 March episode of Saturday Night. Regal stopped the match and proposed that he and Eaton form a team, which Eaton accepted. Regal formed the team The Blue Bloods with Eaton and was involved in humorous vignettes where he tried to teach Eaton the finer points of dining and the proper usage of the Queen's English. The duo first began teaming on the 8 April episode of WCW Saturday Night. Regal also toured WCW's working partner New Japan Pro-Wrestling (NJPW) on 16 April, where he unsuccessfully challenged Shinya Hashimoto for the IWGP Heavyweight Championship. Blue Bloods quickly entered the title picture as they initially feuded with The Nasty Boys (Brian Knobbs and Jerry Sags), their complete opposites in terms of "sophistication" and presentation. Blue Bloods unsuccessfully challenged Nasty Boys for the WCW World Tag Team Championship at The Great American Bash. On the 24 June episode of WorldWide, Blue Bloods retaliated by costing Nasty Boys, the tag team titles against Harlem Heat (Booker T and Stevie Ray). Blue Bloods faced Harlem Heat and Nasty Boys for the title in a triangle match at Bash at the Beach, where they failed again. Blue Bloods soon dropped off the title picture and continued to compete as a mid-card tag team. They added "Squire" David Taylor to the team and Jeeves as their lackey by the end of the year. Eaton and Regal received a shot at the WCW World Tag Team Championship against Sting and Lex Luger on 23 January Clash of the Champions XXXII, where they failed to win the championship.

On the 27 January episode of Saturday Night, Regal was attacked by the debuting Belfast Bruiser during a match, sparking a feud between the duo as the Belfast Bruiser was a Northern Irishman, who developed an on-screen hatred with Regal due to him being English. In March, Regal faced the Bruiser in a match at Uncensored, but Regal lost the match by disqualification after Eaton and Taylor attacked the Bruiser. On the 29 April episode of Monday Nitro, Regal defeated the Bruiser in a Parking Lot Brawl. The duo were scheduled to team in the Lethal Lottery at Slamboree, but the Bruiser suffered an injury and was replaced by Dave Taylor. Regal and Taylor lost to Jim Duggan and VK Wallstreet. Regal challenged Sting to a match to gain some attention in the company, leading to a match between the two at The Great American Bash, which Regal lost.

On the 31 August episode of Saturday Night, Regal captured the World Television Championship for the third time by getting an upset victory over Lex Luger after Luger was attacked by The Outsiders. After winning the title, Regal solely began focusing on his title reign and the Blue Bloods became inactive. He held the title for five months and defended the title against the likes of Hacksaw Jim Duggan, Dean Malenko, former partner Bobby Eaton and Psychosis. Regal was scheduled to defend the title against Rey Misterio Jr. at SuperBrawl VII, but he dropped the title to Prince Iaukea after a distraction by Misterio on the 16 February 1997 episode of Nitro. Six days later, Regal avenged his title loss by costing Misterio the title shot against Iaukea at SuperBrawl VII. Regal got a rematch against Iaukea for the title at Spring Stampede, which he lost. Regal attacked Iaukea on the 7 April episode of Nitro, which resulted in Iaukea losing the title to Último Dragón later that night.

At Slamboree, Regal defeated Ultimo Dragon to win the belt for a fourth time, but lost the title back to Dragon two months later on the 22 July episode of Nitro. Regal got another shot at the title against next champion Alex Wright on the 15 September episode of Nitro, but he failed to capture the title. In the fall of 1997, Regal reformed the Blue Bloods with Dave Taylor and they unsuccessfully challenged Steiner Brothers for the WCW World Tag Team Championship at World War 3. Later that night, Regal participated in the World War 3 three-ring battle royal for a future WCW World Heavyweight Championship match.

On the 9 February 1998 episode of Nitro, Regal was pinned by Bill Goldberg in a match which was Regal's final match with WCW, in that run. The bout garnered controversy as it was said that Regal worked more aggressively and stiff than expected. Regal was confronted by Eric Bischoff after the match and stated to Bischoff, "I can't hit myself." Regal maintains he worked the bout as booked, but he was fired after the bout.

=== World Wrestling Federation (1998−1999) ===
Regal's first appearance in the World Wrestling Federation (WWF) was on the 29 June 1998 episode of Raw Is War in which he defeated Droz via submission with the Regal Stretch. After featuring in one more match against Tiger Ali Singh in Pennsylvania, Regal was sent to a training camp run by Dory Funk Jr. in order to get into shape. On his last day, he twisted his ankle in a match against Rhyno and upon returning home aggravated the injury falling in his bathroom, breaking his ankle and leg.

During this time, Regal was suffering from an addiction to Renewtrient, pain medication, and Valium, and was not seen on WWF television until he returned that fall as the "Real Man's Man", a builder/lumberjack-style gimmick created by Vince Russo and based on the image of The Brawny Man. Vignettes for the character showed him doing "manly" things like chopping wood, shaving with a straight razor, and squeezing his own orange juice. After he made his full-time debut in October 1998, he faced X-Pac in the opening round of the tournament for the vacant WWF Championship at Survivor Series, ending in a double countout and thus eliminating both men from the tournament. Regal then began a feud with The Godfather, but he was taken off television soon after before subsequently checking into rehab in January 1999 and was released from the company in April 1999.

=== Return to WCW (1999−2000) ===
After checking out of rehab, Matthews was invited back into the wrestling world, making a somewhat brief return to WCW as "Lord Steven Regal". His official pay-per-view return took place in July 1999 during Bash at the Beach, where he was one of many participants in the first Hardcore Invitational. The following night on Nitro, Regal, accompanied by both Fit Finlay and Dave Taylor, fought Billy Kidman. Despite outside help from Finlay and Taylor, Regal was unable to pick up the win. Two weeks later, he faced Mikey Whipwreck, but Jimmy Hart's First Family came out to challenge The Blue Bloods at Road Wild for the Hardcore Trophy, causing Regal to lose the match. Nothing came of this challenge as neither the First Family or the Blue Bloods were featured on the Road Wild card. Similar to his previous run, much of Regal's performances took place in tag team bouts. Regal continued his role as a rule breaking villain and had small feuds with teams such as The Filthy Animals. In late February 2000, Regal lost a career vs. career match against Jim Duggan on Saturday Night for the World Television Championship, which was done in order to explain Regal's release from the company.

=== Return to WWF/WWE (2000–2022) ===
==== European Champion (2000–2001) ====
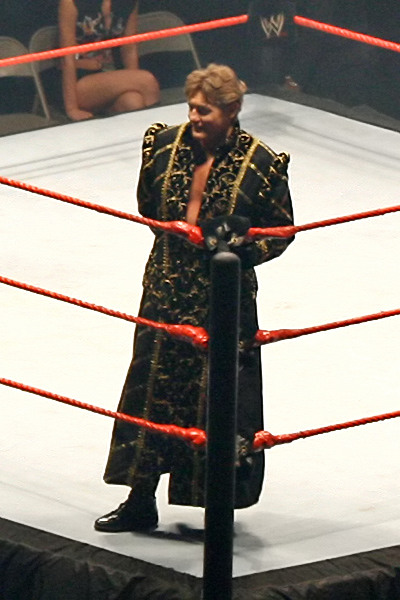
Regal wearing his traditional robe during his entrance

Regal was once again hired by the WWF and sent to the developmental territory Memphis Championship Wrestling (MCW) for a short time. He re-debuted in a match with Chris Benoit at the Third Annual Brian Pillman Memorial Show.

Regal returned on the 18 September 2000 episode of Raw Is War as a heel, under the name Steven William Regal (later shortened to William Regal). Regal defeated Al Snow to win the European Championship on the 16 October episode of Raw Is War. After a successful defence against Naked Mideon at No Mercy on 22 October, Regal would lose the title to Crash Holly at Rebellion on 2 December, before winning it back two days later on Raw Is War. Regal would enter his first Royal Rumble match at the eponymous pay-per-view on 21 January 2001, but failed to win. The next night on Raw Is War, Regal lost the European Championship to Test. On the 8 March episode of SmackDown!, Regal became the new WWF commissioner, after defeating Al Snow.

Regal later became the on-screen commissioner and self-proclaimed "Goodwill Ambassador" of the WWF and was given a comedy sidekick in Tajiri. During The Invasion storyline, Regal turned face as he remained the WWF Commissioner. During the WCW/ECW Alliance storyline, Regal turned heel once again by costing Kurt Angle the WWF Championship on the 8 October episode of Raw and joining The Alliance. He was fired as commissioner by Linda McMahon, but Shane McMahon, who was the owner of WCW, hired him as the Alliance Commissioner.

After the Alliance was defeated at Survivor Series on 18 November, Regal was forced to become the first member of Vince McMahon's "Kiss My Ass" club by kissing McMahon's buttocks so he could keep his job.

==== The Un-Americans (2002–2003) ====
Regal defeated Edge to win the Intercontinental Championship at Royal Rumble on 20 January 2002, after using a set of brass knuckles in order to knock out Edge, an action that would later become a trademark of Regal's character. Regal defended the title against Edge again at No Way Out on 17 February in a brass knuckles on a pole match. He lost the title to Rob Van Dam at WrestleMania X8 on 17 March. The same week, he beat Diamond Dallas Page for the European Championship on the 21 March episode of SmackDown!.

Regal was drafted to the Raw brand in the inaugural WWF draft lottery on the 25 March episode of Raw, thus bringing the European Championship to Raw. Regal lost the European Championship to Spike Dudley on the 8 April episode of Raw. He regained the championship from Dudley on the 6 May episode of Raw to become a four-time champion. Throughout April, Regal would also hold the WWF Hardcore Championship five times, with all of these reigns coming at non-televised house shows. Regal entered the 2002 King of the Ring tournament, but lost to Booker T in the qualifiers on the 3 June episode of Raw.

Regal later lost the European Championship to Jeff Hardy on the 8 July episode of Raw, making Regal the third-to-last champion as the championship was retired later in the year. He joined The Un-Americans, an anti-American alliance consisting of Canadian wrestlers Lance Storm, Christian and Test on the 2 September episode of Raw. At Unforgiven on 22 September, The Un-Americans lost to Bubba Ray Dudley, Kane and Booker T and Goldust.

On the 30 September episode of Raw, every member of The Un-Americans lost their matches, causing the group to separate later in the night and break away into separate groups. Regal began teaming with Lance Storm, Christian formed a tag team with Chris Jericho and Test branched off into single competition. On 30 September episode of Raw, both Christian and Storm lost matches to Randy Orton, while Regal and Test lost to Rob Van Dam and Tommy Dreamer. This led to all four members attacking each other, thus disbanding the team. Storm and Regal won the World Tag Team Championship (Note: In May 2002, the WWF was rebranded to the WWE, after a lawsuit from World Wildlife Fund.) from Booker T and Goldust thanks to Regal's brass knuckles on 6 January 2003 episode of Raw. They lost the championship to Dudley Boyz at the Royal Rumble on 19 January, but they regained the championship the next night on Raw thanks to an impromptu match set up by Chief Morley after Regal and Storm had put Bubba Ray through a table. At No Way Out on 23 February, Regal and Storm defeated Kane and Rob Van Dam to retain the World Tag Team Championship in what would be his last match for over a year.

In his 2005 autobiography, Regal recalls having swelling all over his body, high heart rate and trouble sleeping in the lead-up to the match at No Way Out. During the match, he suffered a concussion and was briefly knocked unconscious. Over the next few days, Regal's health worsened and he consulted a doctor. He was informed that he had contracted a heart parasite from a WWE tour of India in November 2002. This, coupled with his aforementioned concussion, kept him out of action for the rest of the year.

==== Teaming with Eugene (2004–2005) ====
Regal returned after a one-year absence on the 5 April 2004 episode of Raw. Upon his return, Raw General Manager Eric Bischoff appointed him the guardian of his kayfabe "mentally challenged" nephew Eugene. Regal initially refused, but was demanded to do so in order to be reinstated onto the active roster. Initially annoyed at having to "babysit" Eugene, Regal eventually grew very fond of him and they became friends, becoming a face in the process. On the 10 May episode of Raw, Bischoff told Regal to sabotage Eugene's match so he would quit with embarrassment, in return for Regal being reinstated. Despite reluctantly tripping Eugene, he still managed to defeat his opponent. Regal was eventually reinstated on the 21 June episode of Raw, before being put in a match with Kane at Bischoff's behest, which Regal lost after being knocked out by Kane.

In June, Regal was inserted into a feud with Evolution, after the group's leader Triple H tried to convince Eugene that Regal was secretly plotting against him. After weeks of manipulation, Evolution turned on and attacked Eugene on the 12 July episode of Raw, much to Regal's dismay. Triple H would then continue to torment Regal and Eugene, and on the 9 August episode of Raw, Regal was kidnapped and brutalised by Triple H in order to gain an advantage against Eugene. At SummerSlam on 15 August, Regal assisted Eugene in his match against Triple H by attacking his manager Ric Flair. However Eugene would still ultimately lose. Regal teamed with Chris Benoit to defeat Evolution members Batista and Ric Flair at Unforgiven on 12 September. Regal and Eugene won the World Tag Team Championship from La Résistance on the 15 November episode of Raw. However, at New Year's Revolution on 9 January 2005, Eugene legitimately injured himself during their tag title defence against Christian and Tyson Tomko. Although they successfully retained the titles, Eugene would be out of action for over six months. This ultimately cost them the World Tag Team Championship as Regal lost the titles back to La Résistance at a 16 January house show in Winnipeg, Manitoba, Canada, with announcer Jonathan Coachman as Eugene's replacement. On the 7 February episode of Raw, Regal teamed with former tag partner Tajiri to reclaim the titles. On the following week's Raw, Regal and Tajiri faced La Résistance in a rematch for the titles, which they won.

During March and April, Regal and Tajiri defended the titles successfully against the likes of La Résistance multiple times, Maven and Simon Dean, The Hurricane and Rosey and The Heart Throbs. This would lead to a tag team turmoil match involving the aforementioned teams at Backlash on 1 May. Regal and Tajiri were eliminated by La Résistance who, in turn, were eliminated by the Hurricane and Rosey, who became the new champions. Regal appeared at ECW One Night Stand on 12 June as an anti-ECW "crusader" led by Eric Bischoff. At the end of show, Regal and other "crusaders" would engage in a brawl with ECW alumni led by Stone Cold Steve Austin, in which the crusaders were soundly beaten.

==== Various tag teams (2005–2006) ====
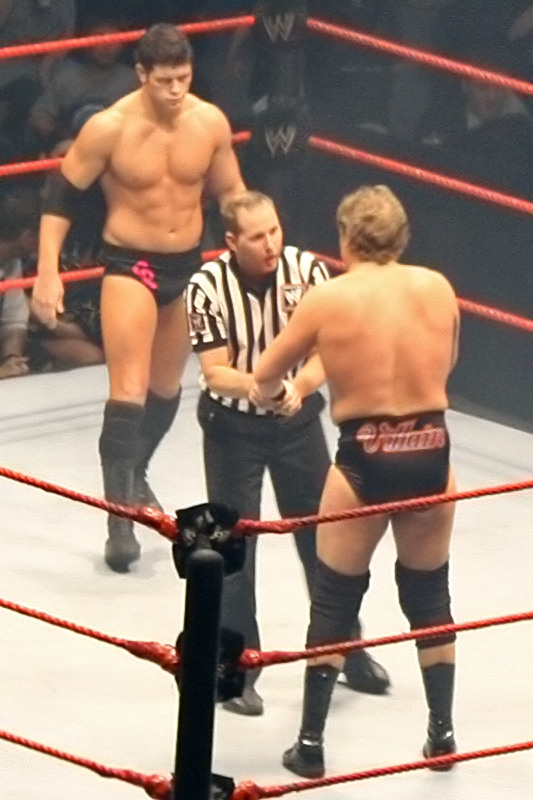
Regal is admonished by the referee following a typical heel action while wrestling Cody Rhodes

On 30 June, Regal was sent to the SmackDown! brand as part of an eleven-person trade during the draft lottery. His first match on SmackDown! was on 7 July against Matt Morgan in what was to be Morgan's final WWE match. It was interrupted before Regal was even able to enter the ring by Mexicools. His first full match as part of the roster was a loss to Chris Benoit in a catch wrestling match on the 16 July episode of Velocity. On 4 August, Regal was scheduled to go one on one with Scotty 2 Hotty, but the Mexicools came in and attacked both men. Two weeks later, they teamed up on SmackDown! against Psicosis and Super Crazy with Juventud in their corner. Halfway through the match, Regal betrayed Scotty by refusing to tag him and walked out of the ring with a smirk on his face, turning heel as a result and allowing the Mexicools to pick up the win. Two days later, Regal cut a promo telling the crowd that he had returned to his former self, referring to himself as a "scoundrel" and a "rogue". The promo ended when Scotty ran to the ring and attacked Regal. The following week, a match between the two was cut short when the debuting Paul Burchill interfered to aid his countryman. Regal went on to take Burchill under his wing and tag with him on the hunt for the WWE Tag Team Championship, but the team's biggest exposure was a loss in a handicap match against Bobby Lashley at Armageddon on 18 December.

On the 3 February 2006 episode of SmackDown!, Regal and Burchill told the "network representative" Palmer Canon that they no longer wanted to be a tag team so they could go their separate ways. During this discussion, Burchill informed Canon that his family heritage traced back to the pirate Blackbeard and that he wanted to turn this into a pirate gimmick. Burchill, with this heroic persona, started a rivalry with former teammate Regal, who tried to convince Burchill to return to his ruthless ways. Regal lost to Burchill in his first match as a pirate. Regal lost a rematch against Burchill, with the match stipulation that Regal would have to dress like a "buxom wench" if he lost. "Lady Regal", as SmackDown! announcers jokingly referred to him, had to dress up like this until Burchill lost a match. This ended after Burchill abandoned him during a tag team loss to The Gymini.

==== King Booker's Court (2006–2007) ====
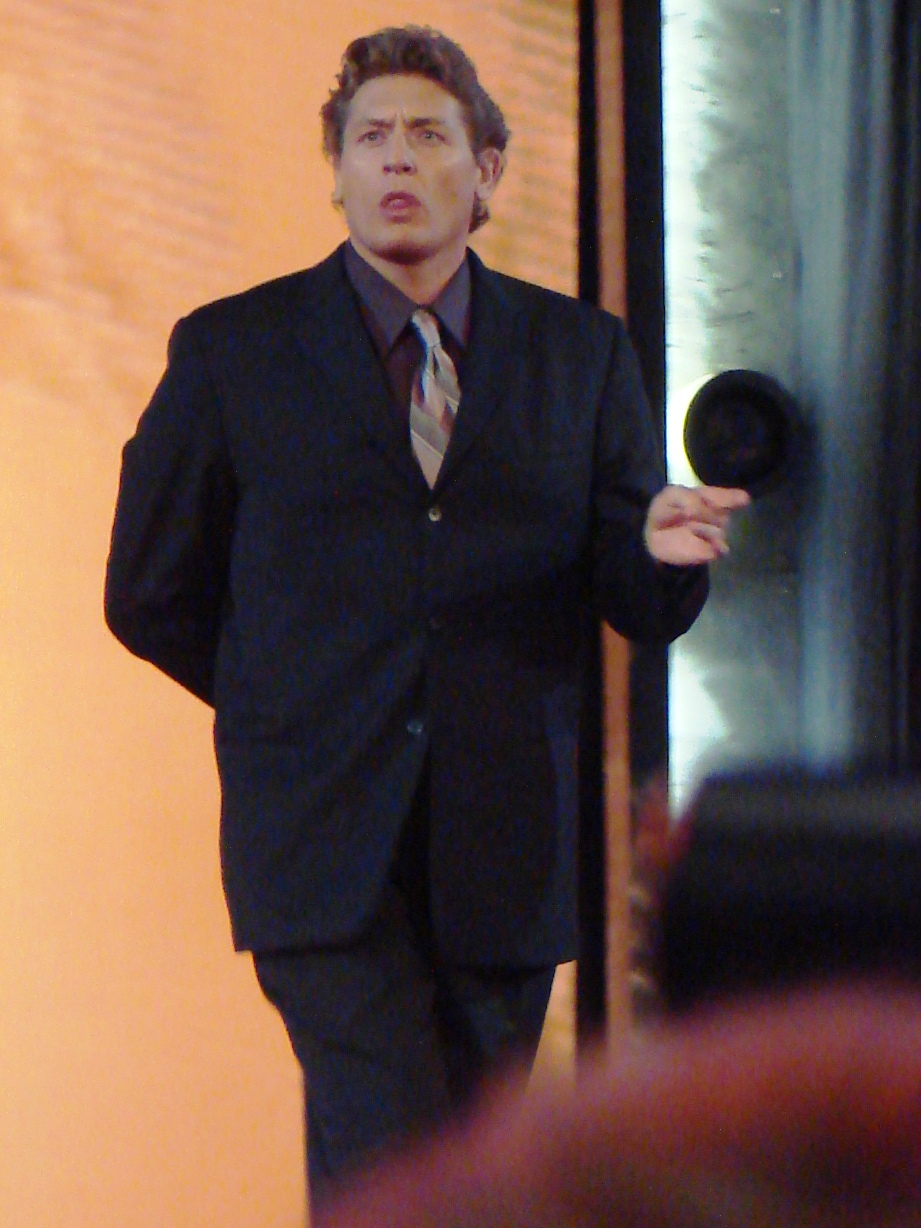
Regal at No Mercy 2007

Regal continued to wrestle in a lower mid-card status, the highlight of which saw him facing the United States Champion John "Bradshaw" Layfield (JBL) in a losing effort while in England. Soon after Booker T became King Booker after becoming King of the Ring, Regal joined King Booker's Court by playing the role of a town crier. As a member of the Court, Regal helped King Booker in his feud against Bobby Lashley, occasionally teaming up with fellow Court member Finlay in tag team matches. However, during this time he also feuded with Finlay for the United States Championship. Regal was knighted by King Booker and was given the title of "Sir". At No Mercy on 8 October, Regal lost to a returning Chris Benoit, resulting in him turning his back on the Court afterwards by knocking down King Booker with a punch to the face after King Booker slapped him and called him useless. During the broadcast, Regal was involved in a backstage segment with Vito in which he accidentally exposed his penis.

Twelve days after No Mercy, Regal stated that while he had once been one of the world's greatest wrestlers, he had since become a doormat for other SmackDown! wrestlers. He referred to being dressed as a buxom wench for a pirate, the aforementioned locker room incident with Vito, and being knighted by a false king as examples. After announcing he was finished being a whipping boy, he introduced his old tag team partner Dave Taylor and the two went on to easily defeat the team of Scotty 2 Hotty and Funaki. Though the pair reformed their previous tag team, they did not reuse the Blue Bloods gimmick and instead portrayed themselves as sadistic fighters. However, the team was quickly put into jeopardy in their second match together when Taylor suffered a torn meniscus in his left knee, leaving him injured. Taylor took a more relaxed role for a couple of weeks as a corner man for Regal and only wrestled in a few short house show matches. Taylor quickly healed from his injury and the pair feuded with the WWE Tag Team Champions Paul London and Brian Kendrick. After defeating London and Kendrick on several occasions, at Armageddon on 17 December they took part in a four-way ladder match alongside Johnny Nitro and Joey Mercury and The Hardys, which London and Kendrick won.

On the 25 May 2007 episode of SmackDown!, Regal and Taylor competed in a number one contenders match for the WWE Tag Team Championship against London and Kendrick, which they lost after Deuce 'n Domino interfered, making both teams the number one contenders. This interference led to a triple threat match the next week on SmackDown! in which Deuce 'n Domino retained the title.

==== Raw General Manager and King of the Ring (2007–2009) ====
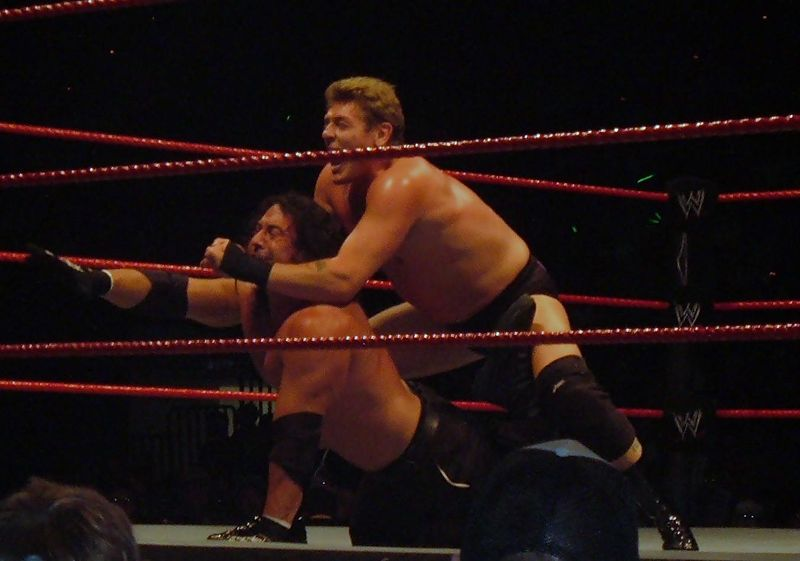
Regal performing the Regal Stretch on Chuck Palumbo in 2007

On 17 June, Regal was drafted to the Raw brand during the supplemental draft, ending his tag team with Dave Taylor. On 2 July, Regal served as Interim general manager of Raw, filling in for Jonathan Coachman. While general manager, Regal introduced the Beat the Clock Sprint to Raw, which was used to determine who would challenge John Cena for the WWE Championship at The Great American Bash on 22 July.

On the 6 August episode of Raw, Regal became the new general manager after winning a battle royal featuring other participants from the Raw roster. He began incorporating game shows into Raw while general manager. On the 3 September episode of Raw, Regal was attacked by WWE Champion John Cena in retaliation for rewarding Randy Orton with a WWE title shot after Orton had kicked John Cena's father in the head the previous week. Regal was missing from Raw programming for one month due to this attack, making his return by siding with Vince McMahon. On the 31 December episode of Raw, Triple H was scheduled to face Ric Flair in which Flair's win or retire ultimatum was still active. Regal announced that if Triple H lost the match in any way, he would not participate in the Royal Rumble match at the Royal Rumble on 27 January 2008. This was to give Triple H a reason to want to win the match rather than avoid ending the career of his best friend and idol. Regal was scheduled to compete against Hornswoggle that night with Mr. McMahon at ringside. McMahon tossed Regal some brass knuckles during the match and encouraged him to use them on Hornswoggle, but he let Hornswoggle go and left the ring. During the Flair versus Triple H match, Triple H was about to pin Flair for the win when Regal suddenly punched Flair in the face with the brass knuckles. This gave Flair the win by disqualification, ensuring that he could continue to wrestle and that Triple H would not be part of the Royal Rumble.

As a result of Regal's actions towards Triple H, the following week on Raw Roulette he lost a First Blood match to Triple H after several right hands to Regal's forehead. A few weeks later, Regal made the Raw Elimination Chamber match for No Way Out on 17 February. He later faced Randy Orton in a match on the 14 April episode of Raw during the European tour to try to teach him some respect. The following week, Regal won the 2008 King of the Ring tournament on a special three-hour Raw, where he defeated Hornswoggle, Finlay and CM Punk all by submission, becoming the first man to make Punk submit. Regal's coronation ceremony the next week was interrupted by the returning Mr. Kennedy. A few weeks later, Regal lost a Loser Gets Fired match to Mr. Kennedy, after which Regal was kayfabe forced to leave WWE. In reality, Regal was suspended on 20 May for sixty days for his second violation of the company's Substance Abuse and Drug Testing Policy. On 28 July, Regal returned from his suspension as a "free agent" during an episode of Raw, where he was defeated by then-World Heavyweight Champion CM Punk.

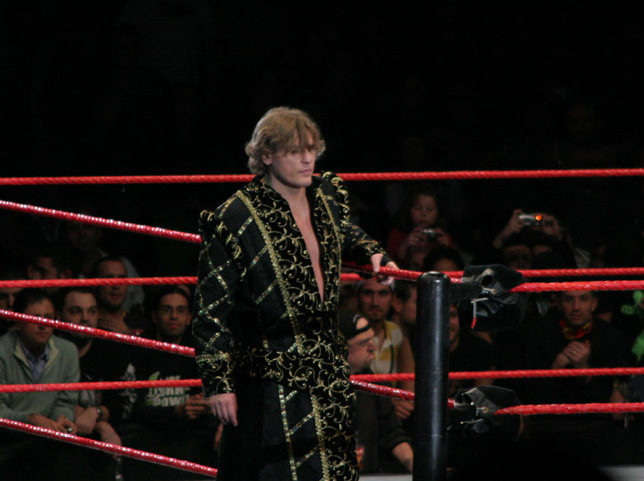
Regal making his entrance at a WWE house show in November 2008

Regal began a mini-feud with Jamie Noble after he took an interest in Noble's romantic interest Layla, prompting him to attack Regal. Both men picked up victories in consecutive weeks, before Regal won their third match, departing with Layla at his side. Regal's feud with Noble escalated the subsequent week when Layla declared that Noble was a loser and that she found a man worthy of her in Regal. However, the feud was short lived.

On the 3 November episode of Raw, Regal won an over-the-top battle royal to face Santino Marella for the Intercontinental Championship and the next week in Manchester, Regal defeated Marella in a 40-second squash match to win his second Intercontinental Championship. Later, he entered into a feud for the title with number one contender CM Punk. On the 5 January 2009 episode of Raw, Regal lost to Punk via disqualification after he grabbed the referee's shirt. Due to this, Stephanie McMahon awarded Punk a rematch the following week, with the stipulation that if Regal was disqualified, he would lose the Intercontinental title, but this time Punk was disqualified. McMahon awarded Punk another rematch, this time a no disqualification match on the 19 January episode of Raw, where Regal lost the title. Regal got a rematch, but lost the match. Following the draft, Regal was left alone on the Raw brand as his on-screen manager Layla was drafted to the SmackDown brand. At Extreme Rules on 7 June, Regal unsuccessfully challenged Kofi Kingston for the United States Championship along with Montel Vontavious Porter (MVP) and Matt Hardy, as Kingston retained the United States Championship by pinning Regal.

==== The Ruthless Roundtable (2009–2010) ====
Regal was traded to the ECW brand on 29 June. In his first match on ECW the following night, he teamed with Vladimir Kozlov to defeat Tommy Dreamer and Christian.

After winning a tag match on the 6 August episode of Superstars, Regal was named as the number one contender to the ECW Championship. On the 18 August episode of ECW, Regal teamed with Kozlov again to face Ezekiel Jackson and the ECW Champion Christian in which Jackson attacked Christian to ensure Regal's victory, with the trio of Regal, Kozlov and Jackson forming a new alliance which was later dubbed the Ruthless Roundtable. At SummerSlam on 23 August, Regal challenged Christian for his title, but was defeated in eight seconds. With the Roundtable's help, Regal defeated Christian in a non-title match on the 25 August episode of ECW to earn a title rematch against Christian at Breaking Point on 13 September, but Christian prevailed again with the rest of the Roundtable banned from ringside. Regal was then denied another chance at number one contender-ship, but The Ruthless Roundtable continued to repeatedly attack Christian to continue the feud. As a result, Christian demanded to face Regal, so he received another shot for the ECW Championship on the 10 November episode of ECW in Sheffield, England, but he was once again unsuccessful.

At Survivor Series on 22 November, Regal participated in a traditional five-on-five Survivor Series elimination match and was eliminated by MVP. Following Survivor Series, dissension was teased within The Ruthless Roundtable, although Jackson seemed poised to leave the group, Regal ultimately sided with Jackson and turned on Kozlov by assisting Jackson in defeating Kozlov to qualify for an ECW Homecoming battle royal to determine the number one contender to the ECW Championship. Jackson won the ECW Homecoming battle royal and was granted a title shot, but Christian defeated him at the Royal Rumble on 31 January 2010 to retain his title. Despite the loss, Regal and Jackson continued to assault Christian, who accepted Jackson's title challenge. On the final episode of ECW on 16 February, Regal helped Jackson defeating Christian in an Extreme Rules match to become the final ECW Champion.

==== Later career (2010–2012) ====
After ECW was cancelled to be replaced by NXT, Regal returned to the Raw brand, but he also became the Pro to Rookie Skip Sheffield on the first season of NXT. Regal made his debut on the 2 March episode of NXT, teaming with Sheffield in a losing effort against Matt Hardy and Justin Gabriel. On the 13 April episode of NXT, Regal won his first match on the show, defeating former pupil Daniel Bryan. On the 10 May episode of NXT, Sheffield was eliminated from the competition.

Regal was mostly involved in lower-card feuds after returning to wrestle on Raw and also regularly appeared on NXT and Superstars. In 2010, he regularly lost tag team matches against Santino Marella while trading wins with Goldust. Regal defeated Darren Young in three matches on Superstars in October and November.

In March 2011, Regal became the colour commentator for the fifth season of NXT. On 26 April, Regal was drafted to SmackDown as part of the 2011 WWE supplemental draft. On NXT, Regal began a feud with rookie Jacob Novak after Novak taunted him as old and washed up. On the 3 May episode of NXT, Regal was set to face Novak, but Novak's Pro JTG stepped in to replace Novak. While Regal had the match won, Novak interfered, attacking Regal and causing a disqualification. This attack turned Regal face. On the 10 May episode of NXT, Regal defeated Novak by submission to end the feud as Novak was eliminated on the next episode.

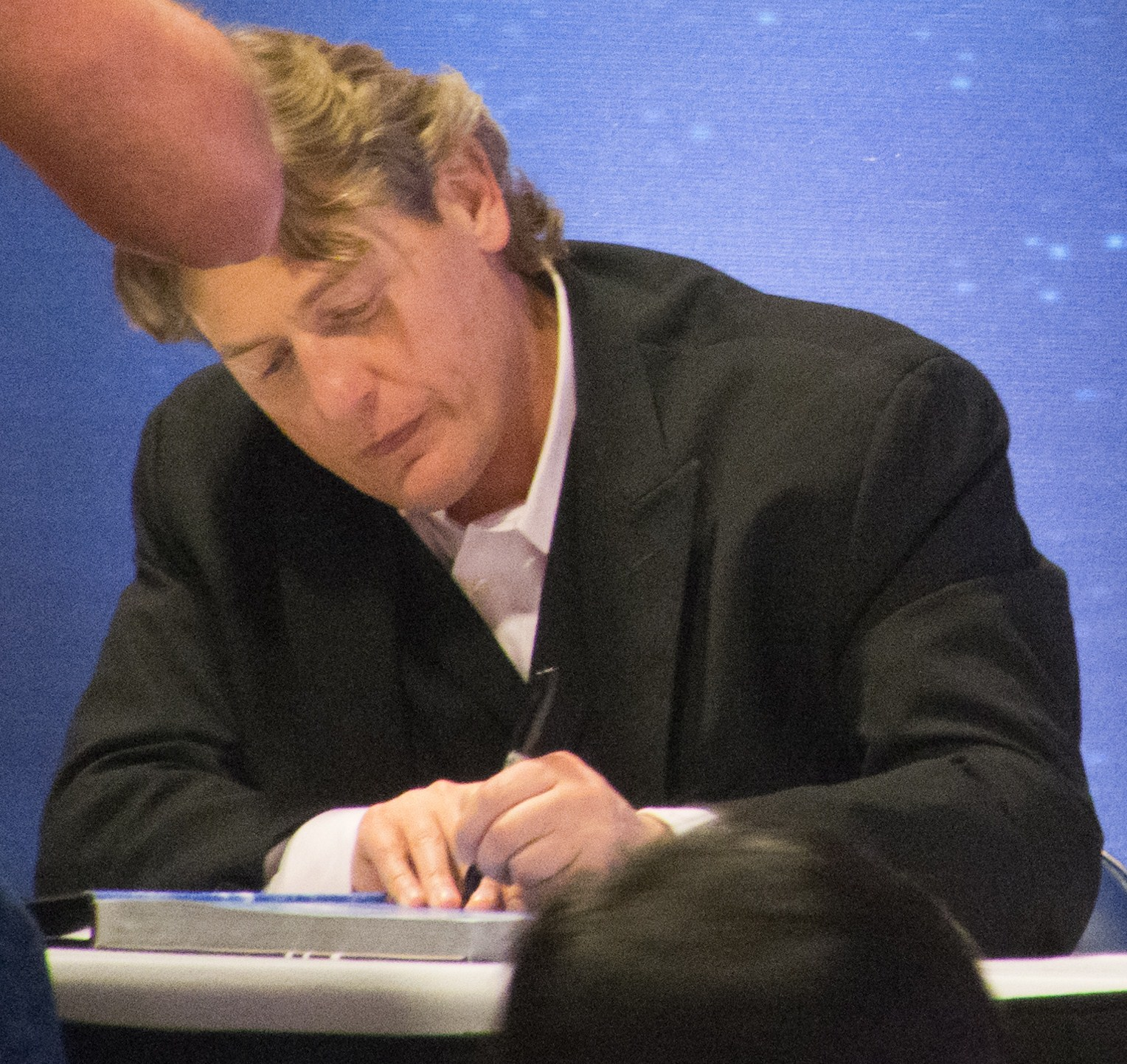
Regal at WrestleMania XXVIII Axxess

After Regal came to the aid of NXT host Matt Striker, saving him from an assault by Darren Young, Young challenged Regal to a match on the 6 September episode of NXT and Regal duly defeated Young. On the 13 September episode of NXT, Regal teamed with Striker against JTG and Darren Young in a losing effort. On the 10 November episode of Superstars held in England, Regal was pranked when his old "Real Man's Man" theme song was played, then lost to protégé Daniel Bryan, but both wrestlers showed respect after the match. On the 15 February 2011 episode of NXT Redemption, Regal temporarily took charge as NXT host from Matt Striker to set up matches on the show, which led to him being made NXT's official match coordinator two weeks later. After being appointed as an authority figure, Regal had issues with NXT's perennial troublemakers, Curt Hawkins and Tyler Reks while Maxine attempted to influence him to get her off NXT.

In 2011, Regal also acted as a colour commentator for Florida Championship Wrestling (FCW) matches and it was during this time he began a feud with Dean Ambrose after an unprovoked attack by Ambrose on Regal, setting up a match between the two on the 6 November episode of FCW, where Regal viciously attacked Ambrose's left arm and pinned Ambrose. Following the loss to Regal, Ambrose became obsessed about wanting a rematch and regularly taunted Regal by using Regal's finishing moves to win matches. A rematch was scheduled as the main event for the final episode of FCW on 15 July. The match began with Regal viciously attacking Ambrose's injured left arm, but Ambrose rammed Regal into the ring post to badly disorientate him. Then Ambrose ruthlessly kneed Regal's head into an exposed turnbuckle, causing Regal to bleed from the ear and the match was then ruled a no contest. After the match, Regal stared down Ambrose, then applauded him and turned his head to allow Ambrose to deliver the Knee Trembler. Afterwards, the FCW locker room stormed the ring to separate Ambrose from a fallen Regal while commentators questioned whether Regal would ever be able to wrestle again. He continued to work as a colour commentator for NXT after FCW was rebranded as NXT.

In 2012, Regal wrestled multiple live event dates wrestling against the likes of Santino Marella and Wade Barrett. Regal ended up on both the winning and losing side. At Over the Limit, Regal participated in a 20-man battle royal, but he was ultimately unsuccessful. In late 2012, Regal played the role of Sheamus' friend in Sheamus' rivalry against Big Show, where he was repeatedly attacked by Big Show. Regal was featured on the 6 November episode of SmackDown in Birmingham, England in which Regal teamed with Sheamus in a loss to Big Show and Wade Barrett and later on the 12 November episode of Raw he lost to Big Show.

==== Final wrestling matches (2012–2013) ====
Regal wrestled for the WWE during the April tour of the United Kingdom losing to Antonio Cesaro on Raw and losing to Wade Barrett on SmackDown. On 1 December, Regal defeated Ace Steel in a match for World League Wrestling in Eldon, Missouri. Regal would later make a surprise appearance on the 17 June 2013 episode of Raw where he challenged Cesaro to a match in which he was defeated.

On 5 December, Regal started a feud with his former disciple Kassius Ohno when he saved Tyson Kidd from an assault by Ohno and Leo Kruger. When Regal later saved Derrick Bateman from Ohno's post-match attack, Ohno confronted Regal, who punched Ohno. The next week, Regal apologised to Ohno. In reply, Ohno stated that he had followed in Regal's footsteps to arrive in WWE, but that Regal's whole career had no legacy, leading to Regal punching Ohno again. After both men continued to attack each other, the rivalry culminated in a match on the 10 April 2013 episode of NXT, which Regal won. Ohno later apologised to Regal. On the 26 June episode of NXT, Regal tried to help Ohno, Adrian Neville and Corey Graves from a joint assault by The Wyatt Family, Garrett Dylan and Scott Dawson, but was overwhelmed. Two weeks later, Graves, Neville and Regal faced The Wyatt Family with Bray Wyatt pinning Regal.

Regal's final in-ring feud was against Antonio Cesaro due to Regal saving Byron Saxton from Cesaro's bullying, which culminated with Cesaro defeating Regal on the 25 December episode of NXT. This would be his final match. In 2017, he confirmed that he had retired from wrestling. However, he wrestled Sami Zayn in a behind-closed-doors match at a WWE try out in Dubai in 2014.

==== Work on NXT (2014–2022) ====
In July 2014, Regal was given the on-screen role of General Manager of NXT. Dave Meltzer later wrote that Regal was "moved from the commentary booth to the figurehead commissioner role, since the decision was made that NXT should be about grooming announcers for the future in WWE, and they simply don't think of Regal for that role". In both late 2014 and early 2015, WWE executive Triple H described Regal as playing a key role in recruiting wrestlers to NXT and WWE as a whole, whether from the wrestling circuit or from other sports. He also became a trainer at the WWE Performance Center after the passing of Dusty Rhodes. As the on-screen General Manager, Regal made regular appearances on NXT television throughout 2015 and 2016. He appeared during the Cruiserweight Classic semi-finals, handing TJ Perkins his medallion for defeating Kota Ibushi. On 22 January 2018, Regal made a brief appearance on stage during the 25th Anniversary episode of Raw as a former Raw general manager. In February, WWE.com referred to him as the WWE Director of Talent Development and Head of Global Recruiting. Regal was named also the on-screen General Manager of the cruiserweight brand 205 Live on 13 April 2020. Regal was released from his WWE contract on 5 January 2022, ending his 22-year tenure with the company.

=== All Elite Wrestling (2022) ===
At the AEW event Revolution in March 2022, Regal made his surprise debut after the match between Jon Moxley and Bryan Danielson, two of his former protégés (with Moxley also being a one-time rival) and broke up their brawl before forcing them to shake hands with each other. During the media scrum after the event, Tony Khan confirmed that Regal had officially signed with the company. He began to manage Danielson and Moxley as a tag team and named them the Blackpool Combat Club (BCC), with Wheeler Yuta and Claudio Castagnoli later joining the group. The BCC feuded with the Jericho Appreciation Society over the summer.

At Full Gear in November, Regal helped MJF win the AEW World Championship from Moxley by handing MJF his signature brass knuckles while the referee was incapacitated. On the 23 November episode of Dynamite, Regal praised MJF but was interrupted by Moxley, who agreed to Danielson's pleas not to attack Regal on the condition that Regal leave and never come back. On the 30 November episode of Dynamite, MJF attacked Regal with his own brass knuckles; following this, it was reported that Regal was set to leave AEW. His final appearance was a pre-taped interview with Tony Schiavone that aired on 7 December edition of Dynamite, in which he told the BCC that he realised they no longer needed him and thus betrayed them to teach them one final lesson: that they should always stay one step ahead, with Jon Moxley's response being the group continues as a unit moving forward. According to Khan, Regal had requested not to renew his contract so that he could return to WWE and work alongside his son, who had made his wrestling debut for WWE while Regal was with AEW. On 30 December, Regal confirmed his departure from AEW on Twitter and spoke highly of his time there.

=== Second return to WWE (2023−present) ===
Regal returned to WWE in January 2023, taking on the behind-the-scenes role of Vice President of Global Talent Development. After Regal left AEW, he had a clause in his contract, so he could not appear on television for an entire year, eventually making his return to WWE television on the 23 January 2024 episode of NXT, appointing Ava as the new general manager of NXT. He later appeared at NXT: Roadblock on 5 March after his son, Charlie Dempsey won the NXT Heritage Cup. On 27 October at NXT Halloween Havoc, Regal appeared and offered to be the cornerman for Lexis King for his upcoming NXT Heritage Cup match against Dempsey. During the match, Regal passed his signature brass knuckles for King to use against Dempsey but King refused, wanting to win the Cup on his own merit and lost the match 0–2 in British Round Rules. On the 24 December episode of NXT (taped 17 December), King, again with Regal as his cornerman, faced Dempsey in a rematch for the NXT Heritage Cup. Regal again passed the brass knuckles to King but King objected. Regal then punched King, to which the brass knuckles fell into the ring. The referee saw Dempsey with the brass knuckles and assumed that Dempsey used it on King and disqualified Dempsey. In British Round Rules, the Cup change hands if the reigning champion gets disqualified, resulting in King becoming the new NXT Heritage Cup Champion.

== Professional wrestling style and persona ==
Regal's style is a hybrid mix of brawling and submission grappling, often utilising a combination of stiff forearm and knee strikes, along with multiple suplex variations to ground an opponent before locking in any number of brutal submissions. While often claiming to be a typical "English gentleman" and a goodwill ambassador, he frequently broke the rules at any given opportunity; he would choke his opponent while the referee was distracted, attack opponents who were tangled in the ropes, and punch his opponent in the head with knuckle dusters when the referee wasn't looking. The latter became one of his signature finishing moves and was named the Power of the Punch. His other signature moves included a running knee lift to a bent-over opponent's head called the Knee Trembler, a bridging leg hook belly-to-back suplex called the Regal-Plex, and an arm-trap cross-legged STF called the Regal Stretch.

== Personal life ==
Matthews began dating Christina Beddoes in 1985, when they were both 17 years old, and they were married in November 1986. They have three sons, one of whom, Bailey, is a professional wrestler currently performing in WWE under the ring name Charlie Dempsey.

Matthews's accent is a combination of his native Black Country accent, the Lancashire accent he picked up after moving to Blackpool at age 16, and the slight Received Pronunciation accent he adopted as part of his haughty upper-class wrestling character. He has a tattoo of a rose adorned with his wife's name on his left arm and a tattoo of the words "made in England" on his left leg. His pets include two dogs, three cats, two snakes, eight lizards, and a tortoise; he once quipped that he owns so many pets because he sees humans as "vile creatures" who disgust him.

On 6 April 1997, just a few hours before Matthews was set to compete at Spring Stampede in Tupelo, Mississippi, he was driving from the gym with Chris Benoit and Benoit's wife Nancy Sullivan when a speeding drunk driver rear-ended them at a stop sign. His car flipped over three times, knocking everyone in the car unconscious; after he regained consciousness, he freed the unconscious Benoit and Sullivan from the wreckage. He suffered a severe concussion in the crash and has no memory of anything from the moment of the incident until two days later. He made it to the arena on time and competed in the match, but did not tell anyone what had happened, resulting in him later finding out that people backstage had witnessed him "wandering around and talking to the walls". While recounting the story in June 2022, he revealed that he had witnessed the drunk driver switching seats with his teenage son after the crash and told the police this information when they arrived at the scene, but he later discovered that the driver did not suffer any consequences due to what Matthews believed was a "good old boys network" in Mississippi.

In 2003, Matthews was misdiagnosed with what was later found to be a heart defect that was causing the right side of his heart to beat out of sequence with the left, allowing large volumes of fluid to build in his body. After undergoing specialist treatment which involved stopping his heart and months of anti-blood clot treatments, he returned to wrestling in April 2004. During his illness and recovery, he gained and then lost 40 lbs of fat.

In his 2005 autobiography, Matthews revealed that he was once arrested during a flight from Japan to the U.S. after getting drunk and urinating on a flight attendant, claiming to be so drunk that his only memory of the incident was waking up in jail in Anchorage, Alaska. In June 2022, he clarified that he was not acting inappropriately and had simply failed to close the toilet door properly, which resulted in him turning around in surprise and urinating on the flight attendant's shoe when she opened the door to check on him. He explained that the plane had actually been forced to land due to a fight breaking out between a group of passengers, not because of his behaviour, and that the flight attendant had confirmed his innocence in court.

On 30 August 2007, Sports Illustrated named Matthews and nine other athletes as those who were found to have been given steroids not in compliance with the WWE Talent Wellness program. He received stanozolol, somatropin, genotropin, and anastrozole between November 2004 and November 2006.

In December 2022, Matthews named Slade as his favourite band and their 1974 track "Far Far Away" as his favourite song. He dubbed comedian Tommy Cooper and Terry Hall of The Specials as people who were influential in his life. He is also a fan of artists The Jam, Liam Gallagher, Joe Longthorne, Motörhead, and Billy Ocean, as well as comedians Mick Miller and Cannon and Ball.

== Other media ==
Matthews has been featured in the WWE video games WWF Road to WrestleMania, WWF SmackDown! Just Bring It, WWE SmackDown! Shut Your Mouth, WWE SmackDown! vs. Raw 2006, SmackDown! vs. RAW 2007, SmackDown! vs. RAW 2008, SmackDown! vs. RAW 2009, SmackDown! vs. RAW 2010, SmackDown! vs. RAW 2011, WWE '12, WWE 2K15, WWE 2K16, WWE 2K22, WWE 2K24, and WWE 2K25. In 2K15 and 2K16, both his modern and WCW-era Lord Steven Regal personas were available.

Matthews participated in a 2001 episode of The Weakest Link alongside other wrestlers, winning two of the first three rounds and eventually finishing third.

Matthews' autobiography, Walking a Golden Mile, was released on 3 May 2005.

Matthews was also featured in WCW vs. nWo: World Tour under his Steven Regal name. While not a playable character, his voice and likeness appear in AEW Fight Forever during tutorial popups. After joining AEW, he briefly co-hosted a podcast titled The Gentleman Villain.

== Championships and accomplishments ==
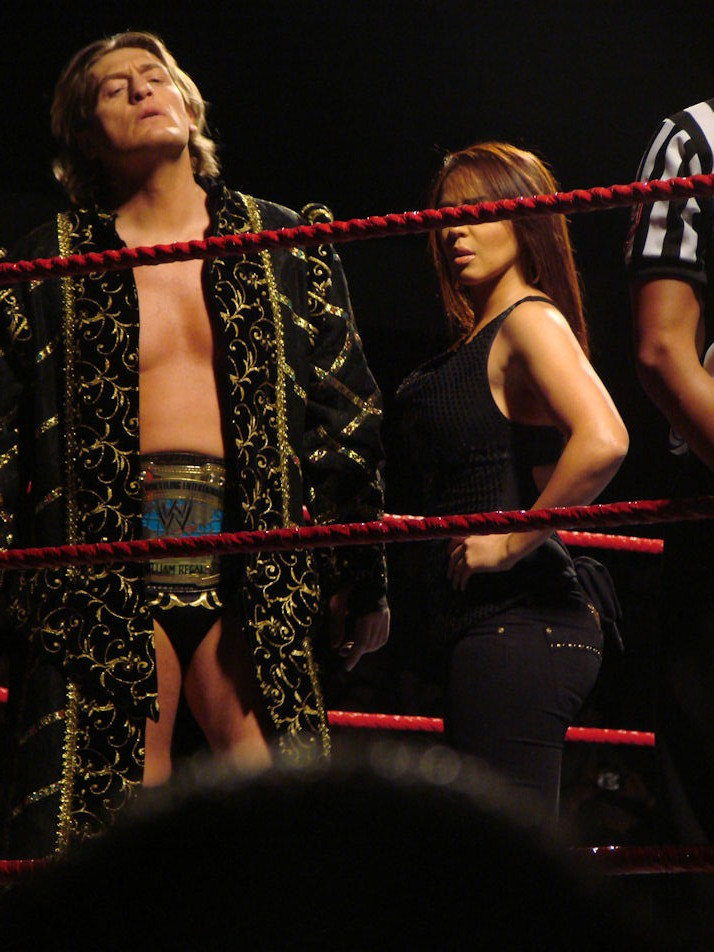
Regal is a two-time WWF/WWE Intercontinental Champion, shown here accompanied by Layla

- Memphis Championship Wrestling
  - MCW Southern Heavyweight Championship (1 time)
- Pro Wrestling Illustrated
  - Ranked No. 18 of the top 500 singles wrestlers in the PWI 500 in 1994
  - Ranked No. 196 of the top 500 singles wrestlers of the PWI Years in 2003
- World Championship Wrestling
  - WCW World Television Championship (4 times)
- World Wrestling Federation/World Wrestling Entertainment
  - WWF Hardcore Championship (3 times)
  - WWF/WWE European Championship (4 times)
  - WWF/WWE Intercontinental Championship (2 times)
  - World Tag Team Championship (4 times) – with Lance Storm (2), Eugene (1) and Tajiri (1)
  - King of the Ring (2008)
- Wrestling Observer Newsletter
  - Best Television Announcer (2013, 2014)

== Bibliography ==
- Matthews, Darren and Chandler, Neil (2005) Walking a Golden Mile, Pocket Books (ISBN 0-7434-7634-4)

== Notes ==
Preceded by Booker T "King Booker"	King of the Ring tournament winner 2008	Succeeded by Sheamus "King Sheamus"
