= Spring Stampede (1994) =

1994 World Championship Wrestling pay-per-view event

- Promotion: World Championship Wrestling
- Date: April 17, 1994
- City: Rosemont, Illinois
- Venue: Rosemont Horizon
- Attendance: 12,200
- Buy rate: 115,000
- Tagline: Locked Horns...Bullish Tempers...Let The Stampede Begin!

Pay-per-view chronology
← Previous; SuperBrawl IV	Next → Slamboree

Spring Stampede chronology
← Previous; First	Next → 1997

The 1994 Spring Stampede was the inaugural Spring Stampede pay-per-view (PPV) event produced by World Championship Wrestling (WCW). The event took place on April 17, 1994, from the Rosemont Horizon in Rosemont, Illinois (though it was billed as Chicago).

The main event was a standard wrestling match between Ric Flair and Ricky Steamboat for the WCW World Heavyweight Championship. The match ended in a double-pin, resulting in Flair retaining the title. However, the Commissioner Nick Bockwinkel stripped Flair of the title and booked a rematch for the title between Flair and Steamboat on the May 14 episode of Saturday Night, which Flair won.

Other matches on the card featured Sting defeating Rick Rude to win the International World Heavyweight Championship and Big Van Vader defeated The Boss while Steve Austin and Lord Steven Regal retained the United States Heavyweight Championship and the World Television Championship respectively.

== Storylines ==
The professional wrestling matches at Spring Stampede involved professional wrestlers performing as characters in scripted events pre-determined by the hosting promotion, WCW. Storylines between the characters played out on WCW's television programs, Saturday Night, WorldWide, Pro and Main Event.

At SuperBrawl IV, Ric Flair defeated Big Van Vader in a Thundercage match to retain the WCW World Heavyweight Championship. During SuperBrawl IV, Ricky Steamboat was named the #1 contender to the World Heavyweight Championship at Spring Stampede. On the March 5 episode of Saturday Night, Steve Austin's manager Col. Robert Parker confronted Steamboat and claimed that Austin deserved the title shot instead of Steamboat, leading to a tag team match, in which Austin and Lord Steven Regal defeated Steamboat and Arn Anderson when Austin pinned Steamboat. On the following week's Saturday Night, Steamboat defeated Austin by disqualification to become the #1 contender for the WCW World Heavyweight Championship at Spring Stampede. Following the match, Steamboat accidentally assaulted the champion Ric Flair after Flair came to rescue Steamboat from Austin and Col. Robert Parker. Flair and Steamboat confronted each other in the following weeks after Flair claimed that he could beat Hulk Hogan and offered Hogan an invitation to watch him beat Steamboat at Spring Stampede and Steamboat recalled having beaten Flair for the NWA World Heavyweight Championship at Chi-Town Rumble in 1989.

At SuperBrawl IV, The Boss acted as the special guest referee during a Thundercage match between Ric Flair and Big Van Vader for the WCW World Heavyweight Championship, during which Vader attacked Boss and handcuffed him to the cage. Boss broke free of the handcuffs during the climax of the match and then attacked Vader and his manager Harley Race and awarded the win to Flair while Flair had applied a figure four leglock on Vader, though the latter had not submitted. Vader confronted Boss on the decision and both men began a feud against each other, leading to a match between the two at Spring Stampede.

Rick Rude and Sting had been involved in a rivalry against each other since the beginning of 1994. At SuperBrawl IV, the team of Sting, Brian Pillman and Dustin Rhodes defeated Rick Rude, Steve Austin and Paul Orndorff in a Thundercage match. After the match, Rude slammed the door of the steel cage on Sting's face and executed a Rude Awakening to Sting on the floor. This intensified their rivalry. Rude commented on Sting that he was not a deserving contender for his International World Heavyweight Championship and Sting decided to wrestle him for the title at Spring Stampede. Rude briefly lost the title to Hiroshi Hase during a tour of New Japan Pro-Wrestling on March 16 but regained the title at the end of the tour on March 24. It was officially announced on the March 26 episode of Pro that Rude would defend the International World Heavyweight Championship against Sting at Spring Stampede.

On the March 12 episode of Worldwide, Lord Steven Regal defended the World Television Championship against Brian Pillman and retained the title via disqualification by hitting Pillman with a cane and then Regal delivered a Piledriver to Pillman outside the ring. On the March 19 episode of Saturday Night, Regal refused to defend the title against Pillman. On the March 26 episode of Pro, it was announced that Regal would defend the title against Pillman at Spring Stampede.

On the March 19 episode of Worldwide, Col. Robert Parker introduced his newest client Bunkhouse Buck to WCW. On the April 2 episode of Pro, it was announced that Buck would face Dustin Rhodes in a Bunkhouse match at Spring Stampede.

At SuperBrawl IV, The Nasty Boys (Brian Knobbs and Jerry Sags) retained the World Tag Team Championship against Cactus Jack and Maxx Payne by getting disqualified when Sags smashed a guitar on Payne. On the March 19 episode of Pro, it was announced that the two teams would compete in a rematch in a Chicago Street Fight at Spring Stampede. On the April 9 episode of Worldwide, Jack and Payne confronted Nasty Boys through a video after the Nasty Boys' match in which they said that there would be no rules at Spring Stampede and they would not have any remorse for their actions.

== Event ==
Other on-screen personnel
Role:	Name:
Commentator	Tony Schiavone
Commentator	Bobby Heenan
Interviewer	Gene Okerlund
Interviewer	Jesse Ventura
Ring announcer	Gary Michael Cappetta
Ring announcer	Michael Buffer
Referees	Randy Anderson
Referees	Nick Patrick

=== Pre-show ===
Before the event aired live on pay-per-view, actors Danny Bonaduce and Christopher Knight competed in a non-televised match, which Bonaduce won. The next dark match that followed saw Pat Tanaka and Haito defeat The Sullivans (Kevin Sullivan and Dave Sullivan) in a tag team match, which Dave injured his knee during the match.

=== Preliminary matches ===
The first match of the event was between Johnny B. Badd and Diamond Dallas Page. DDP gained momentum with a back suplex, a gutbuster, and a snap suplex. He then applied a chinlock on Badd but Badd got out of the move with a back suplex. Badd knocked DDP out of the ring with a Tutti Frutti. He then performed a sunset flip to win the match.

In the following match, Lord Steven Regal defended the World Television Championship against Brian Pillman. Pillman worked on Regal's arm in the earlier part of the match until Regal used Sir William to distract Pillman and gain the advantage over him. Regal used many submission moves on Pillman until Pillman countered a powerbomb attempt into a hurricanrana. Regal then followed it with a Regal Slam. Regal continued his momentum until Pillman dropkicked him while Regal dived onto him from the top turnbuckle. Regal sent Pillman out of the ring with a crossbody and then Sir William interfered whom Pillman attacked when fifteen seconds were remaining and then he suplexed Regal into the ring but the fifteen minute time limit expired and Regal retained the title.

The Nasty Boys (Brian Knobbs and Jerry Sags) took on Cactus Jack and Maxx Payne in a Chicago Street Fight. Both teams used several weapons and the match turned out to be brutal due to the severity of the action. Near the end of the match, Saggs delivered a Piledriver to Jack driving him through a table, and then hit him with a shovel in the back of the head to win the match. After the match, Payne was knocked out with a piece of the broken table.

Next, Steve Austin defended the United States Heavyweight Championship against The Great Muta. Austin started the match with a few punches until Muta applied a headlock on Austin. Muta continued to use submission holds on Austin and then Col. Robert Parker tripped Muta, allowing Austin to attack Muta and gain momentum. Austin delivered a diving knee drop and applied an abdominal stretch on Muta, who hip tossed Austin and whipped him through the ropes to dropkick him but Austin held on to the ropes. Austin delivered a forearm from the second rope but got a near-fall. Muta executed a spin kick on Austin and followed it with a back body drop. Muta attempted a missile dropkick but Austin avoided it. Muta performed a hotshot on Austin followed by a back elbow. Muta executed a diving hurricanrana and then Parker climbed the apron and Muta kicked him off. Austin charged at Muta but Muta delivered a back body drop to Austin, tossing him over the top rope and getting disqualified. As a result, Austin retained the title.

Later, Rick Rude defended the International World Heavyweight Championship against Sting. Before the match began, Harley Race challenged the winner of the match for a future title match on behalf of his client Big Van Vader and then tried to attack Sting but Sting beat him up. Rude attacked Sting from behind but Sting suplexed him out on the floor. Sting tossed Rude into the ring to gain momentum until Rude crotched him on the ropes and tossed him out of the ring and roughed up his back. He delivered a belly-to-back suplex to Sting and then applied a chin lock. Sting escaped the move and attempted a roll-up but Rude applied a sleeper hold. Sting executed a few atomic drops and a clothesline and then attempted a Stinger Splash on Rude but the referee accidentally got in the way and got knocked out. Sting applied a Scorpion Deathlock on Rude and then Race came back and brought Vader along with him. Sting fought them off and Rude clipped Sting's leg with a chop block. Rude attempted a Rude Awakening on Sting but Race accidentally hit him with a steel chair in the back, allowing Sting to pin him to win the title.

This was followed by a Bunkhouse match between Dustin Rhodes and Bunkhouse Buck. Rhodes initially brawled with Buck until Buck broke a lumber on the back of his head to make him bleed. Buck capitalized on the bleeding head until Rhodes threw a powder in his eyes and tried to gain momentum but Buck whipped him with his belt. Both men exchanged momentum until Col. Robert Parker climbed the apron to distract Rhodes. Rhodes suplexed Parker into the ring, which distracted him enough for Buck to roll him up for a near-fall. Parker then handed Buck a pair of brass knuckles and Buck hit Rhodes with the brass knuckles for the victory.

In the penultimate match of the event, The Boss took on Big Van Vader. Vader attacked Boss on the ramp during his entrance before the match started. Vader then tossed Boss into the ring and attempted to dive onto him from the top rope but Boss avoided it and Vader hit the railing. Both men traded moves until Boss delivered a DDT to Vader from the second rope. He then executed a diving crossbody on Vader to get a near-fall and then attempted another diving crossbody but Vader countered by powerslamming him and then dragged him near the corner and delivered a Vader Bomb for a near-fall. He then followed with a Moonsault to win the match. After the match, Harley Race tried to handcuff Boss but Boss attacked Vader, Race, and the referee with his nightstick, which led the Commissioner Nick Bockwinkel to take away his name "Boss" because this was not the way he was supposed to act.

=== Main event match ===
Ric Flair defended the World Heavyweight Championship against Ricky Steamboat in the main event of the show. Steamboat performed many moves on Flair to get control of the match until he missed a dropkick and Flair began attacking him with his chops. Flair then continued to attack Steamboat until a crossbody sent him out of the ring and then Flair attempted a Piledriver on the floor but Steamboat backdropped him on the floor. Steamboat charged at him but Flair moved out of the way and Steamboat crashed into the railing. The duo then returned to the ring and Steamboat hit a superplex. Steamboat followed with a series of chops and applied Flair's own figure four leglock. Flair tried to reach the ropes but Steamboat pulled him in the middle of the ring and Flair raked him in the eye. Both men traded moves until Steamboat hit a diving crossbody to gain a near-fall. Steamboat tried to execute a diving splash but Flair moved out and Steamboat injured his knee, which allowed Flair to apply a figure four leglock. Steamboat reached to the ropes and Flair attempted another figure four leglock but Steamboat rolled him up. Steamboat followed with a backslide for a near-fall and then delivered a superplex, which put both men down on the mat. Steamboat then applied a double chickenwing on Flair and both men's shoulders were pinned to the mat. As a result of the double pinfall, Flair retained the title.

== Reception ==
Spring Stampede received favorable reviews from the critics. The event was a success. Arnold Furious of 411mania rated the event 8.5, appreciating the booking of the event and the performances of the matches. He stated, "The booking in early 1994 was really good for WCW. Flair bringing Steamboat back to the main event scene gave them an instant classic PPV main event without any effort at all. They even left it open for a second match. The undercard was also doing something for a change. The crazy tag title match, the wild brawl from Rhodes-Buck and the super heavies busting their asses made the undercard REALLY solid. Everything else at least had a little energy to it with even Muta showing up eventually. It’s an easy thumbs up and a recommendation to check out."

Ric Flair's booking was considered to be better than former booker Dusty Rhodes' booking style as 411Mania Staff wrote "Flair turned the product around—giving the fans good quality wrestling, which was a huge alternative compared to Dusty’s impractical “shades-of-grey” booking throughout 1993. Some fans think of early '94 as them just doing "stuff".

In 2013, WWE released a list of their "15 best pay-per-views ever", with 1994's Spring Stampede ranked at number four.

== Aftermath ==
Ric Flair initially retained the WCW World Heavyweight Championship but Ricky Steamboat also claimed his right to be the champion due to having pinned Flair, which led Commissioner Nick Bockwinkel to vacate the title on the April 30 episode of Saturday Night due to the controversial ending of the title match at Spring Stampede. Bockwinkel then scheduled a rematch between the two for the vacant title for the May 14 episode of Saturday Night, which Flair won. At Slamboree, Flair successfully defended the WCW World Heavyweight Championship against Barry Windham, who returned to WCW for the first time as Flair's mystery challenger since losing the NWA World Heavyweight Championship to Flair, the previous year at Beach Blast.

The Guardian Angels appeared in WCW on the April 30 episode of Saturday Night to scout Ray Traylor to become a member of the group after Traylor had been banned by Nick Bockwinkel from using the name "The Boss" (in reality, World Wrestling Federation had threatened to sue WCW due to similarities with his WWF-trademarked ring name "Big Boss Man"). Traylor would soon begin using the name "Guardian Angel" and resumed his feud with Vader and the two competed in a match at Bash at the Beach, where Angel was disqualified after the referee saw a nightstick in his hand which he took away from Harley Race.

Sting and Rick Rude continued their rivalry after Spring Stampede, leading to Sting defending the International World Heavyweight Championship against Rude in a rematch at New Japan Pro-Wrestling's Wrestling Dontaku, where Rude won the title in the last match of his career. However, Rude suffered a career-ending injury during the match, which led to Nick Bockwinkel stripping him off the title at Slamboree due to Rude cheating to win the title. On the May 14 episode of Worldwide, Rude walked out during an "I Quit" match (which was taped before Wrestling Dontaku) against Sting due to Vader and Harley Race appearing at the screen to distract and confront Rude as he held Vader responsible for costing him the title at Spring Stampede. Rude was scheduled to face Vader for the title at Slamboree but was unable to compete due to his injury. Bockwinkel awarded the title to Sting, who however insisted on winning the title in a wrestling match and defeated Vader later that night to win the vacant title. On June 23 at Clash of the Champions XXVII, Ric Flair defeated Sting in a title unification match to unify the International World Heavyweight Championship into the WCW World Heavyweight Championship. Flair would then go on to lose the World Heavyweight Championship to the debuting Hulk Hogan at Bash at the Beach.

== Results ==
No.	Results	Stipulations	Times
1^{D}	Danny Bonaduce defeated Christopher Knight	Singles match	—
2^{D}	Pat Tanaka and Haito defeated The Sullivans (Kevin and Dave)	Tag team match	—
3	Johnny B. Badd defeated Diamond Dallas Page (with The Diamond Doll)	Singles match	05:55
4	Lord Steven Regal (c) (with Sir William) vs. Brian Pillman ended in a time-limit draw	Singles match for the WCW World Television Championship	15:00
5	The Nasty Boys (Brian Knobbs and Jerry Sags) defeated Cactus Jack and Maxx Payne	Chicago Street Fight	08:54
6	Steve Austin (c) (with Col. Robert Parker) defeated The Great Muta by disqualification	Singles match for the WCW United States Heavyweight Championship	16:20
7	Sting defeated Rick Rude (c)	Singles match for the WCW International World Heavyweight Championship	12:50
8	Bunkhouse Buck (with Col. Robert Parker) defeated Dustin Rhodes	Bunkhouse match	14:11
9	Big Van Vader (with Harley Race) defeated The Boss	Singles match	09:02
10	Ric Flair (c) vs. Ricky Steamboat ended in a double pin	Singles match for the WCW World Heavyweight Championship	32:19
(c) / – the champion(s) heading into the match; D / – this was a dark match
