= Spring Stampede (2000) =

2000 World Championship Wrestling pay-per-view event

- VHS cover featuring Vampiro, Sting, Scott Steiner, The Wall, Jeff Jarrett and Diamond Dallas Page
- Promotion: World Championship Wrestling
- Date: April 16, 2000
- City: Chicago, Illinois
- Venue: United Center
- Attendance: 12,556
- Buy rate: 115,000
- Tagline(s): Stomp Of Approval; The New Blood And The Millionaires' Club In A Savage Shoot-Out For Gold!

Pay-per-view chronology
← Previous; Uncensored	Next → Slamboree

Spring Stampede chronology
← Previous; 1999	Next → Final

The 2000 Spring Stampede was the fifth and final Spring Stampede pay-per-view (PPV) event produced by World Championship Wrestling (WCW). The event took place on April 16, 2000 from the United Center in Chicago, Illinois. Spring Stampede would be the final wrestling pay-per-view to be held at this venue until Forbidden Door in 2022.

The event was notable due to the creation of a new WCW after Eric Bischoff and Vince Russo rebooted the company by vacating all the championships and refreshing the WCW roster. Many tournaments occurred during the event for the vacated championships. The main event was the tournament final for the vacated WCW World Heavyweight Championship between Diamond Dallas Page and Jeff Jarrett. During the match, Page's wife Kimberly Page turned on her husband, allowing Jarrett to win the title.

The undercard featured tournaments to crown the new World Tag Team and United States Heavyweight Champions. Shane Douglas and Buff Bagwell defeated Ric Flair and The Total Package to win the vacated World Tag Team Championship and Scott Steiner defeated Sting to win the vacated United States Heavyweight Championship. Chris Candido won a Six-Way match for the vacant Cruiserweight Championship and Terry Funk defeated Norman Smiley in a Hardcore match for the vacant Hardcore Championship.

The events of Spring Stampede 2000 would lead to the beginning of an angle, in which the WCW roster was divided into two factions: New Blood and Millionaire's Club. New Blood was the villainous group of young wrestlers and Millionaire's Club was the heroic group of veterans of the industry.

== Storylines ==
The event featured wrestlers from pre-existing scripted feuds and storylines. Wrestlers portrayed villains, heroes, or less distinguishable characters in the scripted events that built tension and culminated in a wrestling match or series of matches.

Other on-screen personnel
Role:	Name:
Commentators	Tony Schiavone
Commentators	Scott Hudson
Commentators	Mark Madden
Interviewer	Gene Okerlund
Referees	Mickie Jay
Referees	Mark Johnson
Referees	Nick Patrick
Referees	Charles Robinson
Referees	Billy Silverman
Ring announcers	David Penzer

== Reception ==
In 2015, Kevin Pantoja of 411Mania gave the event a rating of 3.5 [Bad], stating, "Surprisingly, this is the highest score I’ve given WCW in 2000. Nothing on this show is must see at all, but I managed to see a near three star effort. With the exception of the Mancow/Hart match, everything is at the very least watchable. The fact that there are fourteen matches means that things move by rather quickly, which helps. There was potential here, but everything is so overdone by shenanigans that [it] ends up ruining it."

== Results ==
No.	Results	Stipulations	Times
1	Ric Flair and The Total Package (with Elizabeth) defeated The Harris Brothers (Ron and Don) and The Mamalukes (Big Vito and Johnny the Bull) (with Disco Inferno)	WCW World Tag Team Championship tournament semifinal	06:11
2	Mancow (with Al Roker Jr., Turd the Bartender, and Freak) defeated Jimmy Hart	Singles match	02:48
3	Scott Steiner defeated The Wall by disqualification	WCW United States Heavyweight Championship tournament quarterfinal	03:53
4	Mike Awesome defeated Bam Bam Bigelow	WCW United States Heavyweight Championship tournament quarterfinal	04:00
5	Shane Douglas and Buff Bagwell defeated Harlem Heat 2000 (Stevie Ray and Big T) (with J. Biggs and Kash)	WCW World Tag Team Championship tournament semifinal	02:41
6	Sting defeated Booker	WCW United States Heavyweight Championship tournament quarterfinal	06:34
7	Vampiro defeated Billy Kidman (with Torrie Wilson)	WCW United States Heavyweight Championship tournament quarterfinal	08:28
8	Terry Funk defeated Norman Smiley	Hardcore match for the vacant WCW Hardcore Championship	08:02
9	Scott Steiner defeated Mike Awesome by submission	WCW United States Heavyweight Championship tournament semifinal	03:14
10	Sting defeated Vampiro by submission	WCW United States Heavyweight Championship tournament semifinal	05:59
11	Chris Candido (with Tammy Lynn Sytch) defeated The Artist Formerly Known as Prince Iaukea (with Paisley), Juventud Guerrera, Shannon Moore (with Shane Helms), Lash LeRoux and Crowbar (with Daffney)	Six-Way match for the vacant WCW Cruiserweight Championship	05:12
12	Shane Douglas and Buff Bagwell (with Vince Russo) defeated Ric Flair and The Total Package (with Elizabeth)	Tournament final for the vacant WCW World Tag Team Championship	08:29
13	Scott Steiner defeated Sting by technical submission	Tournament final for the vacant WCW United States Heavyweight Championship	05:33
14	Jeff Jarrett defeated Diamond Dallas Page (with Kimberly Page)	Tournament final for the vacant WCW World Heavyweight Championship	15:02

=== Tournament brackets ===
==== World Heavyweight Championship Tournament ====
Qualification matches (TV)
4	The Total Package	5:00
5	Diamond Dallas Page	Pin
3	Sid Vicious	5:00
6	Sting	CO

Semifinals (TV)
1	Diamond Dallas Page	Pin
Sting	9:01
2	Curt Hennig	8:52
Jeff Jarrett	Pin

Final (PPV)
Diamond Dallas Page	15:02
Jeff Jarrett	Pin

==== World Tag Team Championship Tournament ====
Semifinals (PPV)
1	Ric Flair and The Total Package	Pin
4	The Harris Brothers (Ron Harris and Don Harris); The Mamalukes (Johnny the Bull and Vito)	6:11
3	Harlem Heat 2000 (Stevie Ray and Big T)	2:41
2	Shane Douglas and Buff Bagwell	Pin

Final (PPV)
Ric Flair and Total Package	8:29
Shane Douglas and Buff Bagwell	Pin

==== United States Heavyweight Championship Tournament ====
Quarterfinals (PPV)
Scott Steiner	DQ
The Wall	3:53
Mike Awesome	Pin
Ernest Miller	4:00
Booker T	6:34
Sting	Pin
Vampiro	Pin
Billy Kidman	8:28

Semifinals (PPV)
Scott Steiner	Sub
Mike Awesome	3:14
Vampiro	5:59
Sting	Sub

Final (PPV)
Scott Steiner	Sub
Sting	5:33
