= Slamboree '95: A Legends' Reunion =

1995 World Championship Wrestling pay-per-view event

- Promotional poster featuring various wrestlers
- Promotion: World Championship Wrestling
- Date: May 21, 1995
- City: St. Petersburg, Florida, United States
- Venue: Bayfront Arena
- Attendance: 7,000
- Buy rate: 110,000
- Tagline: A Legends' Reunion

Pay-per-view chronology
← Previous; Uncensored	Next → The Great American Bash

Slamboree chronology
← Previous; 1994	Next → 1996

Slamboree '95: A Legends' Reunion was the third Slamboree professional wrestling pay-per-view (PPV) event produced by World Championship Wrestling (WCW). It took place on May 21, 1995, from the Bayfront Arena in St. Petersburg, Florida in the United States. Eric Bischoff filled in on commentary for Tony Schiavone at this event; Schiavone took time off to undergo neck surgery. Wahoo McDaniel, Angelo Poffo, Terry Funk, Antonio Inoki, Dusty Rhodes, Gordon Solie, and Big John Studd were inducted into the WCW Hall of Fame during the show, which also marked Solie's final appearance on a wrestling broadcast following an announcing career dating back to the 1950s. Solie had declined induction into the Hall of Fame because of the presence of Poffo, whom he considered unworthy of the honor but who was included because of the influence of his son, top WCW star Randy Savage. After being surprised on air by the induction, Solie left WCW. The event also saw the last WCW PPV for ring announcer Gary Michael Cappetta, who still appeared in television tapings for the next month before being replaced.

== Storylines ==
The event featured Professional wrestling matches that involve different wrestlers from pre-existing scripted feuds and storylines. Professional wrestlers portray villains, heroes, or less distinguishable characters in the scripted events that build tension and culminate in a wrestling match or series of matches.

== Event ==
Other on-screen personnel
Role:	Name:
Commentators	Eric Bischoff
Commentators	Bobby Heenan
Commentators	Gordon Solie (McDaniel vs. Murdoch)
Interviewer	Gene Okerlund
Ring announcer	Gary Michael Cappetta
Ring announcer	Michael Buffer
Referees	Randy Anderson
Referees	Nick Patrick

During the pre-show on WCW Main Event, there were four matches. The Blue Bloods (Lord Steven Regal and Earl Robert Eaton) attacked the Nasty Boys (Brian Knobbs and Jerry Sags) by the entryway, prior to their match, in which they defeated Los Especialistas (Especialista I and Especialista II). During the next two matches, Steve Austin defeated Eddie Jackie and Sgt. Craig Pittman defeated Mark Starr.

During the final match, a quarterfinal match for the WCW United States Championship Tournament, Meng defeated Brian Pillman. Following the match, Road Warrior Hawk confronted Meng. This led to the announcement of the two men facing each other, later that night, on the pay-per-view.

In the first match of the pay-per-view, The Nasty Boys won the WCW World Tag Team Championship by defeating Harlem Heat (Booker T and Stevie Ray). Sags began the match by himself, following the injuries Knobbs received during Main Event, before being joined by his partner. Ultimately Sags got the pinfall, following a running powerslam on Booker T. Following the match, The Blue Bloods appears on the entry way again, staring down the new champions.

During the next match, Kevin Sullivan defeated The Man With No Name, via pinfall following the Tree of Woe. Following the match, an unknown individual appeared on the screen telling Sullivan he needed to discuss "Hulkamania" with him. Following this, Sullivan exited the arena through the crowd.

The "Legends match" between Wahoo McDaniel and Dick Murdoch was shown in black and white, during the pay-per-view telecast. For the match Gordon Solie joined on commentary with Bobby Heenan to further the "old school" aspects of the match. The Great Muta then retained the IWGP Heavyweight Championship against Paul Orndorff, and Arn Anderson retained the WCW World Television Championship against Alex Wright, handing Wright his first loss. Road Warrior Hawk and Meng next ended in a double count-out, they ultimately needed to be broken up by additional referees and wrestlers from the back.

During the second to last match of the evening Sting defeated Big Bubba Rogers via submission following the Scorpion Deathlock.

The main event saw Hulk Hogan and Randy Savage defeated Ric Flair and Big Van Vader. During Hogan and Savage's entrance to the ring an unknown man can be seen standing near the entryway (later revealed to be The Giant). Hogan picked up the pinfall following Anderson accidentally hitting Flair, enabling Hogan to do a leg drop on Flair. After the match, Flair, Vader and Anderson continued to attack Hogan and Savage, leading to Savage's father Angelo Poffo to jump the guardrail from ringside to come to his son's rescue. Flair however was able to get the figure four leglock on Poffo, before Hogan and The Renegade were able to get Flair, Anderson and Vader out of the ring.

== Results ==
No.	Results	Stipulations	Times
1^{ME}	The Blue Bloods (Lord Steven Regal and Earl Robert Eaton) defeated Los Especialistas (Especialista I and Especialista II)	Tag team match	01:22
2^{ME}	Steve Austin defeated Eddie Jackie	Singles match	01:00
3^{ME}	Sgt. Craig Pittman defeated Mark Starr by submission	Singles match	02:02
4^{ME}	Meng defeated Brian Pillman	Singles match	04:40
5	The Nasty Boys (Brian Knobbs and Jerry Sags) defeated Harlem Heat (Booker T and Stevie Ray) (c) (with Sister Sherri)	Tag team match for the WCW World Tag Team Championship	10:52
6	Kevin Sullivan defeated The Man With No Name	Singles match	05:24
7	Wahoo McDaniel defeated Dick Murdoch	Singles match	06:18
8	The Great Muta (c) defeated Paul Orndorff	Singles match for the IWGP Heavyweight Championship	14:11
9	Arn Anderson (c) defeated Alex Wright	Singles match for the WCW World Television Championship	11:36
10	Meng (with Col. Robert Parker) vs. Road Warrior Hawk ended in a double countout	Singles match	04:41
11	Sting defeated Big Bubba Rogers by submission	Lights Out match	09:29
12	Hulk Hogan and Randy Savage (with Jimmy Hart and The Renegade) defeated Vader and Ric Flair (with Arn Anderson)	Tag team match	18:57
(c) / – the champion(s) heading into the match; ME / – the match was broadcast prior to the pay-per-view on Main Event
