= List of World Championship Wrestling tournaments =

World Championship Wrestling had held a variety of professional wrestling tournaments competed for by wrestlers that were a part of their roster.

== Sporadic tournaments ==
Pin-Pinfall; Sub-Submission; CO-Countout; DCO-Double countout; DQ-Disqualification; DDQ-Double Disqualification Ref-Referee's decision; NC-No Contest

=== NWA United States Championship Tournament (1975) ===
The NWA United States Championship Tournament was a tournament that took place on November 9, 1975, and was created to crown a new United States Champion after Johnny Valentine suffered a career ending back injury.

Quarterfinals
Rufus R. Jones
Terry Funk
Blackjack Mulligan
Dusty Rhodes
Wahoo McDaniel
Harley Race
Paul Jones
Johnny Weaver

Semifinals
Terry Funk
Dusty Rhodes
Harley Race
Paul Jones

Final
Terry Funk
Paul Jones

=== NWA United States Championship Tournament (1979) ===
The NWA United States Championship Tournament was a tournament that took place on September 1, 1979, to crown a new United States Champion after Ric Flair vacated the championship due to winning the NWA World Tag Team Championship four days earlier.

First Round
Rick Steamboat	PIN
Ernie Ladd
"Nature Boy" Buddy Rogers	SUB
Bob Marcus
Wahoo McDaniel	DDQ
Big John Studd
Ken Patera	PIN
Rufus R. Jones
BYE
BYE
"Superfly" Jimmy Snuka	REF DECISION
"Mr Wrestling" Tim Woods
Bruiser Brody
Johnny Weaver
Jim Brunzell	REF DECISION
Dewey Robertson

Quarterfinals
Rick Steamboat	COUNT OUT
"Nature Boy" Buddy Rogers
Ken Patera
BYE
Jimmy Snuka
BYE
Bruiser Brody
Jim Brunzell	PIN

Semifinals
"TV Champion" Rick Steamboat	PIN
"Mid-Atlantic Champion" Ken Patera
Jimmy Snuka
"High Flyer" Jim Brunzell

Final
Rick Steamboat
Jimmy Snuka	PINFALL; WINNER

=== NWA United States Championship Tournament (1981) ===
The NWA United States Championship Tournament was a tournament to crown the new United States Champion after Wahoo McDaniel vacated the title due to injury.

First Round
Pat Patterson
Mike Davis
Nikolai Volkoff
Ricky Steamboat
Leroy Brown
Super Destroyer
Ron Bass
Ivan Koloff
Sgt. Slaughter
Johnny Weaver
Steve Muslin
Jay Youngblood
Dusty Rhodes
Jacques Goulet
Ron Ritchie
Ole Anderson

Quarterfinals
Pat Patterson
Ricky Steamboat
Leroy Brown
Ivan Koloff
Sgt. Slaughter
Jay Youngblood
Jacques Goulet	DDQ
Ole Anderson

Semifinals
Ricky Steamboat
Leroy Brown
Sgt. Slaughter
BYE

Final
Ricky Steamboat
Sgt. Slaughter

=== NWA United States Championship Tournament (1984) ===
The NWA United States Championship Tournament was a tournament to crown the new United States Champion after Wahoo McDaniel was forced to vacate the title due to his controversial title win over Ricky Steamboat, which took place due to outside interference by Tully Blanchard.

First Round
Mike Rotunda
The Assassin
Wahoo McDaniel
Mark Youngblood
Ivan Koloff
Brian Adias
Don Kernodle
Dusty Rhodes
Manny Fernandez
Paul Kelly
Billy Graham
Carlos Colon
Tully Blanchard
Jimmy Valiant
Ricky Steamboat	DRAW
Ron Bass

Quarterfinals
Mike Rotunda
Wahoo McDaniel
Ivan Koloff	DDQ
Dusty Rhodes
Manny Fernandez
Billy Graham
Tully Blanchard
BYE

Semifinals
Wahoo McDaniel
BYE
Manny Fernandez
Tully Blanchard

Final
Wahoo McDaniel
Manny Fernandez

=== NWA World Television Championship Tournament (1986) ===
The NWA World Television Championship Tournament was a tournament held on January 4, 1986, to crown a new World Television Champion after Dusty Rhodes was stripped of the title due to injury at the hands of Ric Flair and The Minnesota Wrecking Crew.

Quarterfinals
Arn Anderson	pin
Jimmy Valiant	11:13
Black Bart	DCO
Road Warrior Animal	04:45
Tully Blanchard	pin
Ron Bass	10:38
The Barbarian	pin
Wahoo McDaniel	9:31

Semifinals
Arn Anderson
BYE
Tully Blanchard	DQ
Wahoo McDaniel	12:15

Final
Arn Anderson	pin
Wahoo McDaniel	13:24

=== Jim Crockett, Sr. Memorial Cup Tag Team Tournament (1986) ===
The Jim Crockett, Sr. Memorial Cup Tag Team Tournament was a tournament held on April 19, 1986, at The Superdome in New Orleans, Louisiana and had an afternoon & night show.

=== Jim Crockett, Sr. Memorial Cup Tag Team Tournament (1987) ===
The Jim Crockett, Sr. Memorial Cup Tag Team Tournament was a tournament that ran from April 9 to April 10, 1987, with both shows at The Baltimore Arena in Baltimore, Maryland.

=== Jim Crockett, Sr. Memorial Cup Tag Team Tournament (1988) ===
The Jim Crockett, Sr. Memorial Cup Tag Team Tournament was a tournament.

=== NWA United States Tag Team Championship Tournament (1988) ===
The NWA United States Tag Team Championship Tournament was a tournament to crown the new United States Tag Team Champions after the titles were vacated when The Midnight Express won the NWA World Tag Team Championship on September 10, 1988.

Quarterfinals
The Fantastics
The Varsity Club
The Russian Assassins
Ivan Koloff & Nikita Koloff
Al Perez & Larry Zbyszko
Eddie Gilbert and Ron Simmons
The Sheepherders
BYE

Semifinals
The Fantastics
BYE
Eddie Gilbert and Ron Simmons
The Sheepherders

Final
The Fantastics
Eddie Gilbert and Ron Simmons^{1}

Notes:
^{1} The Sheepherders defeated Gilbert and Simmons in the semifinals but were replaced by them in the finals when they left for the WWF.

=== NWA World Tag Team Championship Tournament (1989) ===
The NWA World Tag Team Championship Tournament was a tournament to crown the new World Tag Team Champions after Mike Rotunda and Steve Williams were forced to vacate the titles due to their Varsity Club teammates attacking special guest referee Nikita Koloff during their title defense against Road Warriors at WrestleWar.

Quarterfinals
The Fabulous Freebirds^{1}
The Road Warriors
Johnny Ace and Shane Douglas
Jack Victory and Rip Morgan
Samoan Swat Team
Ranger Ross and Ron Simmons
Butch Reed and The Raider
The Midnight Express

Semifinals
The Fabulous Freebirds
Johnny Ace and Shane Douglas
The Samoan Swat Team
The Midnight Express

Final
The Fabulous Freebirds
The Midnight Express

Notes:
^{1} Terry Gordy originally teamed with Michael Hayes in the quarterfinals while Jimmy Garvin replaced him in the semifinals and finals.

=== Iron Man Tournaments (1989) ===
The Iron Man and Iron Team tournaments were round-robin tournaments featuring four competing individuals and tag teams respectively. The point system: 20 points for a pinfall or submission victory, 15 for a countout victory, 10 for a disqualification victory, 5 for a time-limit draw and 0 for a loss.

Iron Man tournament

	Sting	Luger	Flair	Muta	Total
Sting	*	0	20	20	40
Lex Luger	20	*	5	10	35
Ric Flair	0	5	*	20	25
The Great Muta	0	0	0	*	0

Iron Team tournament

	Warriors	Steiners	Samoans	Doom	Total
The Road Warriors	*	0	20	20	40
The Steiner Brothers	20	*	0	15	35
The New Wild Samoans	0	10	*	20	30
Doom	0	0	0	*	0

=== NWA United States Tag Team Championship Tournament (1990) ===
The NWA United States Tag Team Championship Tournament was a tournament to crown the new United States Tag Team Champions after Eddie Gilbert and Rick Steiner vacated the titles due to Steiner splitting from Gilbert to form a tag team with his brother Scott.

Quarterfinals
Brian Pillman and Tom Zenk
Jack Victory and Rip Morgan
The Midnight Express
Rock 'n' Roll Express
The Fabulous Freebirds
Tommy Rich and Eddie Gilbert
The MOD Squad
Johnny Ace and Shane Douglas

Semifinals
Brian Pillman and Tom Zenk
The Midnight Express
The Fabulous Freebirds
Johnny Ace and Shane Douglas

Final
Brian Pillman and Tom Zenk
The Fabulous Freebirds

=== Running the Gauntlet Tournament (1990) ===
The Running the Gauntlet Tournament was a tournament.

- September 14–16, 1990

Brian Pillman defeated Tim Horner and Buddy Landel, before losing to Dan Spivey.

- September 21–23, 1990

Scott Steiner defeated Bobby Eaton, Ric Flair, and Arn Anderson to run the gauntlet.

- September 28–30, 1990

Bobby Eaton defeated Tracey Smothers and Ricky Morton, before losing to Sid Eudy.

- November 11–13, 1990

Steve Armstrong defeated Stan Lane, but lost to his second opponent Buddy Landel. Had Armstrong defeated Landel, he would've wrestled Bobby Eaton.

- November 17–19, 1990

Rick Steiner defeated Moondog Rex, Sid Vicious and Ric Flair to run the gauntlet.

- November 23–25, 1990

Ric Flair defeated Buddy Landel, but lost to his second opponent Ron Simmons. Had Flair defeated Simmons, he would've wrestled The Nightstalker.

=== Pat O'Connor Memorial International Tag Team Tournament (1990) ===
The Pat O'Connor Memorial International Tag Team Tournament was a tournament at Starrcade.

=== WCW World Tag Team Championship Tournament (1991) ===
The WCW World Tag Team Championship Tournament was a tournament to crown the new World Tag Team Champions after Steiner Brothers vacated the titles due to Scott Steiner suffering an injury.

Quarterfinals
One Man Gang & Black Blood
El Gigante & Big Josh
Rick Steiner and Bill Kazmaier
The Ringlords
Firebreaker Chip & Todd Champion
Terrance Taylor and Richard Morton
The Young Pistols
The Enforcers

Semifinals
One Man Gang and The Executioner
Rick Steiner & Bill Kazmaier
Firebreaker Chip & Todd Champion
The Enforcers

Final
Rick Steiner & Bill Kazmaier
The Enforcers

- The Executioner replaced Black Blood

=== WCW United States Championship Tournament (1991) ===
The WCW United States Championship Tournament was a tournament to crown the new United States Champion after Lex Luger vacated the title upon winning the WCW World Heavyweight Championship at The Great American Bash.

First round
Sting
Arn Anderson
Bobby Eaton
Diamond Studd
Barry Windham
BYE
Steve Austin
Tom Zenk

Quarterfinal
Sting
Diamond Studd
Barry Windham
Steve Austin

Semifinals
Sting
Steve Austin

Final
Sting

=== WCW Light Heavyweight Championship Tournament ===
The WCW Light Heavyweight Championship Tournament was a tournament held in 1991 to crown the first-ever Light Heavyweight Champion. The finals took place at Halloween Havoc, where Brian Pillman defeated Richard Morton to become the inaugural champion.

=== NWA World Tag Team Championship Tournament (1992) ===
The NWA World Tag Team Championship Tournament was a tournament to crown the first-ever NWA World Tag Team Champions. The tournament took place at The Great American Bash on July 12, 1992.

=== Nintendo Top Ten Challenge Tournament (1992) ===
The Nintendo Top Ten Challenge Tournament was a tournament.

First round
Rick Rude
Terry Taylor
Dustin Rhodes
Larry Zbyszko
Ricky Steamboat
Cactus Jack
Big Van Vader
Nikita Koloff
Ron Simmons
Steve Austin

Second round
Rick Rude
Dustin Rhodes
Ricky Steamboat
BYE
Steve Austin

Semifinals
Rick Rude
Ricky Steamboat
Steve Austin

Finals
Rick Rude
BYE

=== King of Cable Tournament ===
The King of Cable Tournament was a single-elimination tournament in 1992. The finals were held at Starrcade.

=== Jesse Ventura Invitational Strongest Arm arm wrestling tournament (1992) ===
The Jesse Ventura Invitational Strongest Arm Tournament was a 1992 arm wrestling tournament held on WCW WorldWide to determine which wrestler on the roster was the best. The competitors were (kayfabe) selected by WCW color analyst Jesse Ventura.

Quarterfinals
Van Hammer
Vinnie Vegas
Vader
Nikita Koloff
The Barbarian
Arn Anderson
Ron Simmons
Steve Austin

Semifinals
Van Hammer
Vader
The Barbarian
Ron Simmons

Final
Van Hammer
Ron Simmons

=== WCW World Television Championship Tournament (1993) ===
The WCW World Television Championship Tournament was a tournament to crown the new World Television Champion after Scott Steiner was stripped of the title due to leaving WCW.

First Round
Paul Orndorff
Too Cold Scorpio
Cactus Jack
Tom Zenk
Johnny B. Badd
Chris Benoit
The Barbarian
Steven Regal
Erik Watts
Johnny Gunn
Maxx Payne
Marcus Bagwell
Robbie V
Shanghai Pierce
Vinnie Vegas
Van Hammer

Quarterfinals
Paul Orndorff
Cactus Jack
Johnny B. Badd
Steven Regal
Erik Watts
Maxx Payne
Robbie V
Vinnie Vegas

Semifinals
Paul Orndorff
Johnny B. Badd
Erik Watts
Vinnie Vegas

Finals
Paul Orndorff
Erik Watts

=== WCW United States Championship Tournament (1993) ===
The WCW United States Championship Tournament was a tournament that ran from December 14, 1992, to January 11, 1993. This was initially a #1 contenders tournament for Rick Rude's United States Heavyweight Championship, but when Rude became injured, he was stripped of the title, thus the final between Ricky Steamboat and Dustin Rhodes was for the championship.

Quarterfinals
Dustin Rhodes
Vinnie Vegas
Tony Atlas
Van Hammer
Barry Windham
Johnny B. Badd
Ricky Steamboat
Dan Spivey

Semifinals
Dustin Rhodes
Tony Atlas
Barry Windham
Ricky Steamboat

Final
Dustin Rhodes
Ricky Steamboat

=== European Cup Tournament (1994) ===
The European Cup Tournament was a tournament that took place from March 3 to March 20, 1994.

First Round
Sting
Kane
Ron Simmons
Marcus Bagwell
Ricky Steamboat
Kole
Steve Austin
Too Cold Scorpio
Ric Flair
Johnny B. Badd
Steven Regal
Maxx Payne
Cactus Jack
Paul Orndorff
Vader
Paul Roma

Quarterfinals
Sting
Ron Simmons
Ricky Steamboat
Steve Austin
Ric Flair
Steven Regal
Cactus Jack
Vader

Semifinals
Sting
Steve Austin
Ric Flair
Vader

Finals
Sting
Vader

=== WCW United States Championship Tournament (1995) ===
The WCW United States Championship Tournament was a tournament to crown the new United States Heavyweight Champion after Vader was stripped of the title due to injuring Dave Sullivan.

=== Slim Jim Challenge (1995) ===
The Slim Jim Challenge was a tournament.

Semifinals
1	Paul Orndorff
4	Jim Duggan
3	Flyin' Brian
2	Big Bubba Rogers

Final
Paul Orndorff
Flyin' Brian

=== Lord Of The Ring Tournament (1996) ===
The Lord Of The Ring Tournament was a tournament from Slamboree 1996, where teams were randomly selected through lottery, which every team that won their respective matches, would win a spot at the Lord Of The Ring Battle Royal later on that night.

No.	Results	Stipulations	Times
1	Booker T & Road Warrior Animal vs. Lex Luger & Road Warrior Hawk ended in Double Count Out	Lord Of The Ring First Round	6:54
2	Diamond Dallas Page & The Barbarian defeated Hugh Morrus & Meng	Lord Of The Ring First Round	5:15
3	Dick Slater & Earl Robert Eaton defeated Alex Wright & Disco Inferno	Lord Of The Ring First Round	2:56
4	Fire And Ice (Ice Train & Scott Norton) defeated Big Bubba Rogers & Stevie Ray	Lord Of The Ring First Round	3:32
5	"Hacksaw" Jim Duggan & V.K. Wallstreet defeated The Blue Bloods (Lord Steven Regal & Squire David Taylor)	Lord Of The Ring First Round	3:46
6	Randy Savage & Ric Flair defeated Arn Anderson & Eddie Guerrero	Lord Of The Ring First Round	4:04
7	Rick Steiner & The Booty Man defeated Scott Steiner & Sgt. Craig Pittman	Lord Of The Ring First Round	8:21
8	The Public Enemy (Johnny Grunge & Rocco Rock) defeated Chris Benoit & The Taskmaster	Lord Of The Ring First Round	4:44
9	Diamond Dallas Page & The Barbarian defeated Rick Steiner & The Booty Man	Lord Of The Ring Semi Final	5:05
10	Dick Slater & Earl Robert Eaton defeated Jim Duggan & VK Wallstreet	Lord Of The Ring Semi Final	4:08
11	The Public Enemy (Johnny Grunge & Rocco Rock) defeated Randy Savage & Ric Flair by forfeit	Lord Of The Ring Semi Final	—
12	Diamond Dallas Page defeated Dick Slater and The Barbarian and Earl Robert Eaton and Ice-Train and Johnny Grunge and Rocco Rock and Scott Norton	Lord Of The Ring Final Battle Royal	9:33

=== WCW United States Championship Tournament (1996) ===
The WCW United States Championship Tournament was a tournament to crown the new United States Heavyweight Champion after Ric Flair vacated the title due to shoulder injury.

=== WCW Women's Championship Tournament (1996) ===
The WCW Women's Championship Tournament was a tournament to determine the first-ever Women's Champion, with the finals taking place at Starrcade.

=== WCW Women's Cruiserweight Championship Tournament (1997) ===
The WCW Women's Cruiserweight Championship Tournament was a tournament to crown the first-ever Women's Cruiserweight Champion.

=== WCW World Tag Team Championship Tournament (1999) ===
The WCW World Tag Team Championship Tournament was a tournament to crown the new World Tag Team Champions after Rick Steiner was stripped of the titles due to suffering an injury. The tournament finals took place at Superbrawl IX.

=== WCW United States Championship Tournament (1999) ===
The WCW United States Championship Tournament was a tournament to crown the new United States Heavyweight Champion after Scott Hall was stripped of the title by Ric Flair.

Quarterfinals
Scott Steiner
Chris Jericho
Meng
Bam Bam Bigelow
Booker T
Perry Saturn
Chris Jericho*
Chris Adams

Semifinals
Scott Steiner
Meng
Booker T
Chris Jericho

Final
Scott Steiner
Booker T

- After Jericho was eliminated by Steiner, he was able to negotiate his way back in.

=== WCW World Heavyweight Championship Tournament (1999) ===
The WCW World Heavyweight Championship Tournament was a tournament to crown the new World Heavyweight Champion after Sting was stripped of the title due to attacking a referee at Halloween Havoc. The tournament finals took place at Mayhem.

=== WCW World Tag Team Championship Tournament (January 2000) ===
The WCW World Tag Team Championship Tournament was a tournament to crown the new World Tag Team Champions after The Outsiders vacated the title due to Scott Hall suffering an injury.

First Round
Kevin Nash
Wall & Sid Vicious
PG-13
Rick Steiner & Berlyn
The Harris Brothers
Meng & Fit Finlay
Dean Malenko & Konnan
Mike Rotunda & Buzzkill
Buff Bagwell & Kanyon
Disco Inferno & Big Vito
Jim Duggan & Perry Saturn
Asya & Norman Smiley
Midnight & Lash LeRoux
Harlem Heat
Vampiro & Evan Karagias
David Flair & Crowbar

Quarterfinals
Kevin Nash & Scott Steiner
PG-13
The Harris Brothers
Mike Rotunda & Buzzkill
Buff Bagwell & Kanyon
Asya & Norman Smiley
Midnight & Lash Leroux
David Flair & Crowbar

Semifinals
Kevin Nash & Scott Steiner
The Harris Brothers
Buff Bagwell & Vampiro
David Flair & Crowbar

Finals
Kevin Nash & Scott Steiner
David Flair & Crowbar

Scott Steiner became Kevin Nash's partner in the second round.

Vampiro replaced Kanyon in the third round.

=== WCW Cruiserweight Championship Tournament (2000) ===
The WCW Cruiserweight Championship Tournament was a tournament for the vacated Cruiserweight Championship, which took place after Oklahoma was forced to vacate the title due to exceeding the weight limit of a cruiserweight.

=== WCW World Heavyweight Championship Tournament (2000) ===
The WCW World Heavyweight Championship Tournament was a tournament to crown the new World Heavyweight Champion after Eric Bischoff and Vince Russo vacated all the titles.

=== WCW United States Championship Tournament (April 2000) ===
The WCW United States Championship Tournament was a tournament to crown the new United States Heavyweight Champion after Eric Bischoff and Vince Russo vacated all the titles. The tournament took place at Spring Stampede.

=== WCW World Tag Team Championship Tournament (April 2000) ===
The WCW World Tag Team Championship Tournament was a tournament to crown the new World Tag Team Champions after Eric Bischoff and Vince Russo vacated all the titles. The tournament took place at Spring Stampede.

=== WCW United States Championship Tournament (July 2000) ===
The WCW United States Championship Tournament was a tournament that took place on July 18, 2000, for the vacated United States Championship after Scott Steiner was stripped of the title due to using his banned Steiner Recliner on Mike Awesome during a match at Bash at the Beach.

Quarterfinals
Shane Douglas	3:53
Billy Kidman	DQ
Buff Bagwell	4:00
Lance Storm	Sub
Mike Awesome	6:34
Kanyon	Pin
Vampiro	8:28
Great Muta	Pin

Semifinals
Shane Douglas	4:30
Lance Storm	Pin
Mike Awesome	3:35
Great Muta	Pin

Final
Lance Storm	5:05
Mike Awesome	Sub

=== London Lethal Lottery Tag Team Tournament (2000) ===
The London Lethal Lottery Tag Team Tournament was a tournament.

Semifinals
1	Scott Steiner and Sting
4	Bam Bam Bigelow and Mike Awesome
3	KroniK
2	Booker T and Lex Luger

Final
Scott Steiner and Sting
Kronik

=== WCW Hardcore Championship Tournament (2000) ===
The WCW Hardcore Championship Tournament was a tournament to crown the new Hardcore Champion after Mike Sanders stripped Norman Smiley of the title.

Semifinals
1	Johnny The Bull
4	Sgt. AWOL
3	Crowbar
2	Reno

Final
Sgt. AWOL
Reno

- Sgt. AWOL originally defeated Reno in the finals but WCW Commissioner Mike Sanders reversed the decision and awarded the win to Reno.

=== European Cup Tournament (2000) ===
The European Cup Tournament was a tournament.

=== WCW Cruiserweight Tag Team Championship Tournament (2001) ===
The WCW Cruiserweight Tag Team Championship Tournament was a tournament to crown the inaugural Cruiserweight Tag Team Champions.

== See also ==
- Professional wrestling tournament
