= The Great American Bash (1995) =

World Championship Wrestling pay-per-view event

- Promotional poster
- Promotion: World Championship Wrestling
- Date: June 18, 1995
- City: Dayton, Ohio
- Venue: Hara Arena
- Attendance: 6,000
- Buy rate: 100,000
- Tagline(s): Back By Popular Demand! Celebrate With Some Red, White, Black and Blue!

Pay-per-view chronology
← Previous; Slamboree	Next → Bash at the Beach

The Great American Bash chronology
← Previous; 1992	Next → 1996

The 1995 Great American Bash was a professional wrestling pay-per-view event produced by World Championship Wrestling (WCW). It was the fifth Great American Bash under the WCW banner and ninth Great American Bash event overall. It took place on June 18, 1995, at the Hara Arena in Dayton, Ohio. This was the first Great American Bash event in nearly three years, with the last event taking place in 1992.

Seven matches were contested at the event. The main event was a standard wrestling match between Ric Flair and Randy Savage, which was part of a rivalry stemming from a match in a tournament to crown the new United States Heavyweight Champion. Flair defeated Savage. The undercard featured several matches including a tournament final for the United States Heavyweight Championship between Sting and Meng. Sting defeated Meng to win the title.

== Production ==
=== Background ===
The Great American Bash is a professional wrestling event established in 1985. It was first produced by the National Wrestling Alliance's (NWA) Jim Crockett Promotions (JCP) and aired on closed-circuit television before becoming a pay-per-view event in 1988; JCP was rebranded as World Championship Wrestling (WCW) later that same year. WCW then seceded from the NWA in 1991. The 1995 event was the fifth Great American Bash event promoted by WCW and the ninth overall. The event took place on June 18, 1995, at the Hara Arena in Dayton, Ohio. It was the first Great American Bash event held since the 1992 event.

=== Storylines ===
The event featured wrestlers from pre-existing scripted feuds and storylines. Wrestlers portrayed villains, heroes, or less distinguishable characters in the scripted events that built tension and culminated in a wrestling match or series of matches.

==== Flair, Savage, and the United States Championship tournament ====
Entering 1995, Vader was the reigning United States Champion; he won the championship at Starrcade by defeating Hacksaw Jim Duggan In March 1995, as Vader was in the midst of challenging Hulk Hogan for the WCW World Heavyweight Championship, he was stripped of the United States Championship for repeatedly attacking and injuring his fellow competitors, the last of which was Evad Sullivan. To settle the vacant championship, sixteen wrestlers were chosen to participate in a single-elimination tournament. The tournament commenced on the April 22, 1995 installment of WCW Saturday Night and was to conclude at The Great American Bash. Among the sixteen competitors were Ric Flair, a five-time former United States Champion, and Randy Savage, contending for his first championship since joining WCW at the end of 1994. Their participation in the tournament was coinciding with a continuation of the feud that had carried over from their days in the World Wrestling Federation. Flair, who had been forced to retire from WCW in October 1994 after suffering a defeat to Hogan at Halloween Havoc, attacked Savage during his match with Avalanche at Uncensored in March. Two months later, at May's Slamboree, a reinstated Flair teamed with Vader to take on Hogan and Savage in a tag team match; while Flair and Vader were defeated, a brawl after the match saw him attack Angelo Poffo, Savage's father, and place him in the figure four leglock.

Savage and Flair reached the semifinals of the tournament along with Sting and Meng. Savage defeated The Butcher and "Stunning" Steve Austin in his two tournament matches to that point, while Flair's first match was a victory over The Patriot. In his second contest, Flair faced Alex Wright in a match where Savage caused a disqualification by attacking the multiple-time former world champion.

Sting, meanwhile, had defeated Arn Anderson in his opening match and then took out Paul Orndorff to advance to the other semifinal match. Meng earned his chance by defeating Marcus Alexander Bagwell and Flyin' Brian. Both semifinal matches were scheduled for June 3, 1995, on Saturday Night, with Flair and Savage scheduled first. Before Flair could enter the ring, Savage ran backstage and began assaulting him, with the ensuing brawl resulting in the match being called off. Since the two had signed to face each other at The Great American Bash, it was decided that they would both be removed from the tournament and that the other semifinal contest, which had yet to take place, would now be pushed back to the pay-per-view with either Sting or Meng becoming the new United States Champion.

==== Other storylines ====
In March 1995, Hulk Hogan began hyping his "ultimate surprise" which he would reveal at Uncensored in March to combat the alliance of Vader, Ric Flair and Arn Anderson. It was rumored that the surprise would be Ultimate Warrior but it was the debut of The Renegade. Renegade would aid Hogan and Randy Savage in their feud with Flair, Vader and Anderson. Renegade then challenged Anderson to a match for the World Television Championship at The Great American Bash, which was later made official.

On the May 21 episode of Main Event during Slamboree pre-show, The Blue Bloods (Earl Robert Eaton and Lord Steven Regal) attacked The Nasty Boys (Brian Knobbs and Jerry Sags) backstage. Later that night at Slamboree, Nasty Boys defeated Harlem Heat (Booker T and Stevie Ray) to win the World Tag Team Championship and Blue Bloods showed up at the aisle to confront Nasty Boys. On the May 27 episode of Saturday Night, Nasty Boys expressed their desire to face Blue Bloods for the titles. On the June 3 episode of Saturday Night, a match between the two teams was made official for the title at The Great American Bash.

Sgt. Craig Pittman began an undefeated streak following his WCW debut in February. On the June 3 episode of Saturday Night, it was announced that Pittman would face Marcus Alexander Bagwell in a match at The Great American Bash.

On the February 18 episode of Pro, Dave Sullivan was scheduled to compete in an arm wrestling contest against Diamond Dallas Page but DDP faked an arm injury and brought in Max Muscle as his replacement, who defeated Sullivan after Sullivan was distracted by The Diamond Doll's beauty. Due to the pre-match stipulation, Sullivan had to hand over his childhood piggy back to DDP, who threw it to break it down. Soon after, Diamond Doll would develop an affection for Sullivan as she visited him in hospital on the April 15 episode of Saturday Night while he was recovering from an attack by Vader in March. The affection between Sullivan and Doll grew to the point leading DDP to challenge Sullivan to an arm wrestling contest at The Great American Bash. A stipulation was added to the match that if Sullivan won then he would get a date with Doll and if DDP won then he would get Sullivan's pet rabbit Ralph.

== Event ==
Other on-screen personnel
Role:	Name:
Commentators	Tony Schiavone
Commentators	Bobby Heenan
Interviewer	Gene Okerlund
Ring announcer	David Penzer
Referee	Nick Patrick
Referee	Jimmy Jett
Referee	Randy Anderson

The Fantastics were substitutes for the Rock 'n' Roll Express, who failed to show, due to commitments with the National Wrestling Alliance and Smoky Mountain Wrestling. Scott D'Amore was mistakenly billed as Chris Kanyon in this match. After their match, Harlem Heat and Sister Sherri came out to confront Dick Slater and Bunkhouse Buck; Sherri punched Col. Robert Parker and challenged Slater and Buck to a match later that night. Dave Sullivan won a date with the Diamond Doll by defeating Diamond Dallas Page; had Page won he would've taken possession of Ralph, Sulivan's pet rabbit. Referee Nick Patrick disqualified Sgt. Craig Pittman when he refused to let go of the Code Red while Jim Duggan was holding onto the ropes. Pittman was originally supposed to face Marcus Alexander Bagwell, but Bagwell suffered an injury and Duggan was announced as his replacement. The match between Sting and Meng was originally scheduled as a semifinal match in the United States Championship Tournament started after Big Van Vader was stripped of the title. However, the other semifinal between Ric Flair and Randy Savage ended in a no-contest and both men were eliminated from the tournament.

== Results ==
No.	Results	Stipulations	Times
1^{ME}	Harlem Heat (Booker T and Stevie Ray) (with Sister Sherri) defeated The Fantastics (Bobby Fulton and Tommy Rogers)	Tag team match	06:46
2^{ME}	Sgt. Craig Pittman defeated Scott D'Amore	Singles match	02:16
3^{ME}	Dick Slater and Bunkhouse Buck (with Col. Robert Parker) defeated Frankie Lancaster and Barry Houston	Tag team match	03:52
4	Alex Wright defeated Brian Pillman	Singles match	15:42
5	Dave Sullivan defeated Diamond Dallas Page (with the Diamond Doll and Max Muscle)	Arm Wrestling contest	—
6	Jim Duggan defeated Sgt. Craig Pittman by disqualification	Singles match	08:13
7	Harlem Heat (Booker T and Stevie Ray) (with Sister Sherri) defeated Dick Slater and Bunkhouse Buck (with Col. Robert Parker and Meng)	Tag team match	08:39
8	The Renegade (with Jimmy Hart) defeated Arn Anderson (c)	Singles match for the WCW World Television Championship	09:07
9	The Nasty Boys (Brian Knobbs and Jerry Sags) (c) defeated The Blue Bloods (Earl Robert Eaton and Lord Steven Regal)	Tag team match for the WCW World Tag Team Championship	15:03
10	Sting defeated Meng (with Col. Robert Parker)	Singles match for the vacant WCW United States Heavyweight Championship	13:34
11	Ric Flair defeated Randy Savage (with Angelo Poffo)	Singles match	14:42
(c) / – the champion(s) heading into the match; ME / – the match was broadcast prior to the pay-per-view on Main Event

=== Tournament bracket ===
First Round (TV)
Sting	10:36
Arn Anderson	sub
Paul Orndorff	8:27
Johnny B. Badd	pin
Meng	8:12
Marcus Bagwell	pin
Brian Pillman	0:15
Bunkhouse Buck	pin
Ric Flair	10:15
The Patriot	pin
Alex Wright
Big Bubba Rogers	DQ
Randy Savage	5:46
The Butcher	pin
Steve Austin	7:14
Jim Duggan	pin

Quarterfinals (TV)
Sting
Paul Orndorff	sub
Meng	4:41
Brian Pillman	pin
Ric Flair	9:53
Alex Wright	DQ
Randy Savage	2:19
Steve Austin	pin

Semifinals (TV/PPV)
Sting	13:34
Meng^{1}	pin
Ric Flair
Randy Savage	NC

Finals
Sting

^1This match was originally scheduled as a semifinal match in the tournament but the other semi-final match between Randy Savage and Ric Flair ended in a no contest and both men were eliminated from the tournament, resulting in Sting and Meng's match determining the champion.
