= Slamboree (1996) =

1996 World Championship Wrestling pay-per-view event

- Promotional poster featuring various wrestlers
- Promotion: World Championship Wrestling
- Date: May 19, 1996
- City: Baton Rouge, Louisiana
- Venue: Riverside Centroplex
- Attendance: 7,791
- Buy rate: 155,000
- Tagline: What goes up Must come down...HARD!

Pay-per-view chronology
← Previous; Uncensored	Next → The Great American Bash

Slamboree chronology
← Previous; 1995	Next → 1997

The 1996 Slamboree was the fourth Slamboree professional wrestling pay-per-view event produced by World Championship Wrestling (WCW). The event took place on May 19, 1996 from the Riverside Centroplex in Baton Rouge, Louisiana.

The key feature of the event was a Lord of the Ring tournament, in which wrestlers were randomly paired in Lethal Lottery tag team matches to qualify for a Battlebowl battle royal and the winner of that battle royal would earn a title shot at the WCW World Heavyweight Championship. Diamond Dallas Page won the Battlebowl and earned the title of the Lord of the Ring. Aside from the Lord of the Ring tournament, three titles were defended on the card. In the main event, The Giant defeated Sting to retain the WCW World Heavyweight Championship after performing a Chokeslam. In the other title matches, Konnan retained the WCW United States Heavyweight Championship against Jushin Liger and Dean Malenko retained the WCW Cruiserweight Championship against Brad Armstrong.

== Storylines ==
At Uncensored, the WCW World Tag Team Champion Sting and Booker T defeated Road Warriors in a Street Fight to get Harlem Heat, a title shot for the WCW World Tag Team Championship against Sting and Lex Luger. Later in the night, Hulk Hogan and Randy Savage defeated Alliance to End Hulkamania, a team consisting of Four Horsemen and The Dungeon of Doom, in a Doomsday Cage match after Dungeon member Lex Luger hit Flair with a loaded glove. This sparked tension within the Alliance as the following night on Monday Nitro as Horsemen leader Ric Flair defended the WCW World Heavyweight Championship against Dungeon member The Giant and the match ended in a no contest after interference by Flair's Four Horsemen teammate Arn Anderson and Giant's Dungeon of Doom leader The Taskmaster. Anderson hit Giant with a steel chair and handed it over to Taskmaster and Giant assumed that Taskmaster hit him with it and then attacked his mentor, thus quitting the Dungeon. This also marked the beginning of a rivalry between Dungeon and Horsemen and the end of Alliance. His exit from the Dungeon was confirmed after he came to the ring with a new entrance music and defeated Dungeon member Big Bubba Rogers on the March 30 episode of Saturday Night. Jimmy Hart paid off Harlem Heat to let Giant compete against Sting on the April 1 episode of Monday Nitro. Later that night, Flair successfully defended his title against Luger. On the April 13 episode of Saturday Night, Flair teamed with Giant to pick up a victory against The American Males (Marcus Bagwell and Scotty Riggs). Two nights later on Monday Nitro, Flair and Giant challenged Sting and Lex Luger for the World Tag Team Championship but lost via disqualification. The following week, on Monday Nitro, Sting and Luger took on Flair and Giant in a title versus title match where Flair's World Heavyweight Championship and Sting and Luger's World Tag Team Championship were on the line. The match ended after Flair inadvertently threw a powder into Giant's face which was intended for Sting and Luger. This angered the Giant and set up a title match between the two on the April 29 episode of Monday Nitro, where Giant defeated Flair to win the title. This set up a match between Giant and Sting for the title at Slamboree. Sting began accusing Luger of his betrayal but Luger proved Sting of his loyalty and constantly challenged Giant for the title and got a title shot against Giant on the May 13 episode of Monday Nitro, which ended in a no contest after Sting prevented Giant from driving Luger with the announce table with a Chokeslam. Sting and Luger reconciled on the May 18 episode of Saturday Night.

== Event ==
Other on-screen personnel
Role:	Name:
Commentators	Tony Schiavone
Commentators	Bobby Heenan
Commentators	Dusty Rhodes
Interviewer	Gene Okerlund
Ring announcers	David Penzer
Ring announcers	Michael Buffer
Referees	Randy Anderson
Referees	Nick Patrick

=== Pre-show ===
Before the event aired live on pay-per-view, The American Males (Marcus Bagwell and Scotty Riggs) competed against Dungeon of Doom members The Shark and Maxx in a tag team match which aired on Main Event. American Males won after Maxx accidentally dropped Shark with a Clothesline while Shark was attempting a Powerslam on Riggs and Riggs fell on Shark for the pinfall victory. Shark attacked Maxx in retaliation, which resulted in the WCW World Heavyweight Champion The Giant performing a Chokeslam on Shark.

=== Preliminary matches ===
The main theme of the event was a Lord of the Ring tournament for a WCW World Heavyweight Championship match at The Great American Bash, in which wrestlers were randomly paired in Lethal Lottery tag team matches to qualify for a Battlebowl battle royal. The opening match of the first round of the tournament featured Road Warriors on separate teams as Road Warrior Hawk and Booker T took on Lex Luger and Road Warrior Animal. Booker gained a near-fall on Luger by performing an axe kick. Luger began fighting with Hawk and a brawl took place during which Road Warriors united against Booker and Luger and then Luger left the ringside. The match ended in a double count-out and both teams were eliminated from the tournament.

Public Enemy (Johnny Grunge and Rocco Rock) faced Chris Benoit and The Taskmaster in the next match. Taskmaster held Benoit down on the table and Public Enemy delivered a Drive-By on Benoit through the table and Taskmaster moved out of the way. Public Enemy won as a result.

Steiner Brothers were separated in the next match as Rick Steiner was paired with The Booty Man against Scott Steiner and Sgt. Craig Pittman after Pittman applied a Code Red on Booty Man and he accidentally tagged Rick, allowing Rick to deliver a German suplex for the victory.

VK Wallstreet and Jim Duggan defeated The Blue Bloods (Lord Steven Regal and Squire David Taylor) after Duggan hit Taylor with a taped fist.

Dick Slater and Earl Robert Eaton, the third half of Blue Bloods, defeated Alex Wright and Disco Inferno after Slater hit Inferno with his cowboy boot while Inferno was dancing in the ring.

The next match saw Faces of Fear on separate teams as Meng and The Barbarian were paired with Hugh Morrus and Diamond Dallas Page respectively. Originally, Barbarian was set to team with Bobby Walker, but due to an injury to Walker, Page was a last-minute replacement. After a back and forth match, Meng delivered a savate kick to DDP and Barbarian delivered a Kick of Fear to Morrus and Faces of Fear simultaneously pinned DDP and Morrus. However, DDP put his foot on the rope and the referee counted Barbarian's pinfall. DDP and Barbarian qualified for the next round.

Fire and Ice (Scott Norton and Ice Train) defeated Big Bubba Rogers and Stevie Ray when Norton pinned Rogers after Rogers collided with Ray.

The final match of the first round pitted rivals Ric Flair and Randy Savage against Arn Anderson and Eddie Guerrero. Anderson attacked Savage before the match and Flair joined Anderson in assaulting him until Guerrero made the save. Flair and Anderson were allied with each other throughout the match despite being on opposing teams. Anderson turned on Guerrero by delivering a DDT, allowing Flair to pin him for the victory. Fire and Ice were randomly selected to perform in the Battlebowl battle royal without having to wrestle in the second round.

Dean Malenko defended the WCW Cruiserweight Championship against Brad Armstrong. Both men traded momentum throughout the match until Armstrong applied Malenko's own submission move, Texas Cloverleaf on Malenko but Malenko caught the ropes. Armstrong attempted the move again but Malenko caught him and delivered a fireman's carry gutbuster from the second rope to retain the title.

The second round of the Lord of the Ring tournament began with Dick Slater and Earl Robert Eaton beating VK Wallstreet and Jim Duggan when Eaton rolled up Duggan after Duggan and Wallstreet began arguing with each other.

Ric Flair and Randy Savage lost to Public Enemy by forfeit after Savage attacked Flair during his entrance as a retribution for Flair's attack on Savage in their earlier match.

Rick Steiner and The Booty Man took on Diamond Dallas Page and The Barbarian in the final qualifying match for the Battlebowl. Booty Man attempted to win the match with a high knee on Barbarian but got a near-fall and then rolled him up for the pinfall but Page delivered an elbow drop to Booty Man and Barbarian pinned him to win the match.

Konnan defended the WCW United States Heavyweight Championship against Jushin Thunder Liger in the second title match of the night. After trading momentum, Liger delivered a fisherman buster and Konnan delivered a whiplash slam for near-falls. Liger performed a Ligerbomb on Konnan but got a near-fall and then climbed the top rope and landed on Konnan, which allowed Konnan to deliver a Splash Mountain to retain the title.

The Lord of the Ring battle royal was the final match on the undercard and the match stipulated that the winner would earn a title shot at the WCW World Heavyweight Championship. The Barbarian eliminated Diamond Dallas Page but the referee did not see it and Page remained in the match. Rocco Rock charged at Barbarian but Barbarian tossed him over the top rope with a back body drop for the first official elimination of the match. Dick Slater then eliminated Earl Robert Eaton and the two continued to brawl with each other to the backstage area. DDP eliminated Scott Norton over the top rope. Ice Train and Barbarian dominated the opponents and then Train attacked Barbarian. The pinfall stipulation was quietly added into the match after DDP eliminated Johnny Grunge and then Train with Diamond Cutter. DDP and Barbarian exchanged moves and Barbarian attempted a diving headbutt on Page but Page avoided it and performed a Diamond Cutter to win the Battlebowl.

=== Main event match ===
In the main event, The Giant defended the WCW World Heavyweight Championship against Sting. Sting tried to attack Giant as the match began but Giant overpowered his opponent and dominated him for the earlier part of the match. Giant tossed Sting out of the ring and tried to perform a Chokeslam on the announce table but Sting's tag team partner Lex Luger put Jimmy Hart in the place, preventing Giant from performing the move. Giant accidentally dropkicked the referee, allowing Sting to gain momentum as he delivered a Stinger Splash in the ring. Sting diverted his attention to Hart with a Stinger Splash but missed, with Lex Luger appearing to pull Hart out of the way, and then performed a diving splash on Giant for a near-fall. Sting applied a Scorpion Deathlock on Giant and then Luger and Hart began fighting for Hart's megaphone, during which Luger-supposedly- accidentally hit Sting with the megaphone and Giant capitalized by delivering a Chokeslam to retain the title.

== Aftermath ==
The title shot was revoked the next night on Nitro, after footage shown that Page was thrown over the top rope by The Barbarian and one foot touched the floor. A feud between Sting and Luger-whose allegiance to Sting appeared to be in question following his role in costing Sting the title- also never materialized soon afterward, with the two maintaining the WCW World Tag Team Titles for the next month and uniting to face the New World Order. Luger would also soon face The Giant at the 1996 Great American Bash for the title, with Sting in his corner.

== Results ==
No.	Results	Stipulations	Times
1^{ME}	The American Males (Marcus Bagwell and Scotty Riggs) defeated The Shark and Maxx (with Jimmy Hart)	Tag team match	02:39
2	Road Warrior Animal and Booker T vs. Road Warrior Hawk and Lex Luger ended in a double countout	Lethal Lottery tag team match	06:54
3	The Public Enemy (Rocco Rock and Johnny Grunge) defeated Chris Benoit and The Taskmaster (with Jimmy Hart)	Lethal Lottery tag team match	04:44
4	Rick Steiner and The Booty Man (with The Booty Babe) defeated Sgt. Craig Pittman and Scott Steiner	Lethal Lottery tag team match	08:21
5	VK Wallstreet and Jim Duggan defeated The Blue Bloods (Lord Steven Regal and Squire David Taylor)	Lethal Lottery tag team match	03:46
6	Dick Slater and Earl Robert Eaton (with Col. Robert Parker) defeated Disco Inferno and Alex Wright	Lethal Lottery tag team match	02:56
7	Diamond Dallas Page and The Barbarian defeated Meng and Hugh Morrus	Lethal Lottery tag team match	05:15
8	Fire and Ice (Scott Norton and Ice Train) defeated Big Bubba Rogers and Stevie Ray	Lethal Lottery tag team match	03:32
9	Ric Flair and Randy Savage (with Woman and Miss Elizabeth) defeated Arn Anderson and Eddie Guerrero	Lethal Lottery tag team match	04:04
10	Dean Malenko (c) defeated Brad Armstrong	Singles match for the WCW Cruiserweight Championship	08:29
11	Dick Slater and Earl Robert Eaton defeated VK Wallstreet and Jim Duggan	Lethal Lottery tag team match	04:08
12	The Public Enemy (Rocco Rock and Johnny Grunge) defeated Ric Flair and Randy Savage (with Woman and Miss Elizabeth) by forfeit	Lethal Lottery tag team match	00:00
13	Diamond Dallas Page and The Barbarian defeated Rick Steiner and The Booty Man (with The Booty Babe)	Lethal Lottery tag team match	05:05
14	Konnan (c) defeated Jushin Thunder Liger	Singles match for the WCW United States Heavyweight Championship	09:30
15	Diamond Dallas Page won by last eliminating The Barbarian	Battlebowl to determine the #1 contender for the WCW World Heavyweight Championship	09:33
16	The Giant (c) (with Jimmy Hart) defeated Sting (with Lex Luger)	Singles match for the WCW World Heavyweight Championship	10:41
(c) / – the champion(s) heading into the match; ME / – the match was broadcast prior to the pay-per-view on Main Event

=== Battlebowl eliminations ===
Elimination no.	Wrestler	Eliminated by	Elimination move
1	Rocco Rock	The Barbarian	Over the top rope via back body drop
2	Earl Robert Eaton	Dick Slater	Over the top rope via running boot
3	Dick Slater	N/A	Unknown
4	Scott Norton	Diamond Dallas Page	Over the top rope
5	Johnny Grunge	Diamond Dallas Page	Diamond Cutter
6	Ice Train	Diamond Dallas Page	Diamond Cutter
7	The Barbarian	Diamond Dallas Page	Diamond Cutter
Winner:	Diamond Dallas Page		
