= Barry Houston =

American professional wrestler

Personal information
- Born: August 22, 1970 (age 56) Miami, Florida, U.S.

Professional wrestling career
- Ring name(s): Agony; Barry Houston
- Billed height: 6 ft 1 in (1.85 m)
- Billed weight: 210 lb (95 kg)
- Billed from: Texas City, Texas
- Trained by: Dory Funk, Jr.
- Debut: 1994
- Retired: 2003

Todd Passmore (born August 22, 1970) is a semi-retired American professional wrestler, known by his ringname Barry Houston, who has competed in North American independent promotions including Music City Wrestling, the National Wrestling Alliance and World Championship Wrestling. He was also part of third incarnation of "The Black Harts" teaming with David Heath in IWA Japan during the mid-1990s.

== Career ==
In early 1994, he began appearing in World Championship Wrestling losing to Terry Funk and Bunkhouse Buck in a tag team match with Erik Watts during WCW Worldwide on May 17 and the following week on WCW Saturday Night, teamed with Todd Morton to lose to Pretty Wonderful (Paul Orndorff and Paul Roma) on May 24 after being pinned by Roma. He also lost to Harlem Heat in several matches with Watts, Morton, Brian Armstrong and Buddy Wayne during the next few weeks.

On April 4, 1995, Houston lost to "Mr. Wonderful" Paul Orndorff on WCW Saturday Night in Atlanta, Georgia; during the match, Orndorff appeared to have a black eye as a result of the backstage fight between Orndorff and Big Van Vader earlier that night. Teaming with Frankie Lancaster, the two lost to Colonel Parker's Stud Stable (Bunkhouse Buck and "Dirty" Dick Slater) a dark match at The Great American Bash held at the Hara Arena in Dayton, Ohio on June 18, 1995. During the next several months, he would become a regular on WCW Saturday Night facing Al Snow, Kamala, The Blacktop Bully, Meng, Kevin Sullivan and Mr. JL in single matches before teaming with Frankie Lancaster and Mark Starr in a 6-man tag team match against The Four Horsemen (Brian Pillman, Arn Anderson and "Nature Boy" Ric Flair) on Monday Night Nitro on October 30, 1995.

After losing to V.K. Wallstreet on November 25, Passmore left WCW the next year and began teaming with David Heath as "The Black Harts" replacing Tom Nash as Heath's regular tag team partner. Managed by Luna Vachon, Passmore and Heath had a successful run as a gaijin tag team with IWA Japan eventually touring with Heath four more times between June 1996 and May 1997. Houston was praised by wrestler Mick Foley after seeing him at Korakuen Hall in Tokyo on June 4, 1996. The two split after Heath began wrestling for All Japan Pro Wrestling and later for the World Wrestling Federation the following year. On December 27, 1997, Houston himself received a tryout match for the WWF facing Tom Brandi on Shotgun Saturday Night.

Briefly returning to WCW, Houston competed in the cruiserweight division against La Parka, Super Calo, El Dandy, Norman Smiley and WCW Cruiserweight Champion Chris Jericho before again training under Dory Funk, Jr. at the WWF Dojo later during the year. On October 24, 1998, Houston appeared at the NWA 50th Anniversary show in Cherry Hill, New Jersey participating in a 14-man battle royal along with other students of the WWF Dojo including Devon Storm, Steve Corino, Giant Silva, Christopher Daniels, Babu, Teddy Hart, Shawn Stasiak, Glenn Kulka, Andrew Martin, Kurt Angle, Tom Prichard, Tiger Ali Singh and "Dr. Death" Steve Williams who eventually won the battle royal.

In early 2000, he began competing in NWA Worldwide teaming with The Colorado Kid to defeat Big Bully Douglas and Rick Cornell on February 5 as well as single matches against Tony Falk and Basket Case that same month. He later teamed with Sean O'Hare against Rick Cornell & Alan Funk as well as wrestling against Slash and Chris Champion during the year.

Continuing to wrestle with the National Wrestling Alliance throughout the country, he soon became a mainstay in the Tennessee-area winning the vacant NWA Nashville Television Championship in a three-way dance with Big Bully Douglas and Chris Gatlin on April 20, 2001. He also appeared in USA Wrestling defeating Outlaw Lover on August 18. He later lost to Bart Sawyer in a fan participation strap match for a NWA USA event in Nashville, Tennessee on November 11.

Appearing at an event for Tony Falk's USWO, he lost to Jarell by disqualification in Madison, Tennessee on May 23, 2003.

== Championships and accomplishments ==
- National Wrestling Alliance (Regional)
  - NWA Nashville Television Championship (1 time) - first champion
- Pro Wrestling Illustrated
  - PWI ranked him #419 of the 500 best singles wrestlers of the PWI 500 in 1994.
  - PWI ranked him #414 of the 500 best singles wrestlers of the PWI 500 in 1993.
