= The Renegade (wrestler) =

American professional wrestler (1965–1999)

- Wilson as The Renegade c. 1995

Personal information
- Born: Richard Wilson; October 16, 1965 Marietta, Georgia, U.S.
- Died: February 23, 1999 (aged 33) Marietta, Georgia, U.S.
- Cause of death: Suicide

Professional wrestling career
- Ring name(s): The Renegade; Rio, Lord of the Jungle; Rick Wilson
- Billed height: 5 ft 10 in (178 cm)
- Billed weight: 255 lb (116 kg)
- Billed from: Parts Unknown; Macon, Georgia; Columbus, Georgia; Los Angeles, California
- Trained by: Richard Byrne
- Debut: May 26, 1990

Richard L. Wilson (October 16, 1965 – February 23, 1999) was an American professional wrestler. He was best known for his tenure in World Championship Wrestling (WCW) under the ring name The Renegade, where he was a one-time WCW World Television Champion.

== Early life ==
Wilson was born in Marietta, Georgia, and lived an abusive childhood; his father was in jail for his involvement in a car accident, and his stepfather frequently beat him. He worked as an exotic dancer in the New England area.

== Professional wrestling career ==
=== Early career (1990–1995) ===
Wilson went to Boston to train for a wrestling career under the tutelage of Killer Kowalski, but Kowalski never trained him, so Richard Byrne, one of Kowalski's students, continued his in-ring education. Wilson debuted on May 26, 1990 for a television taping for the North Carolina–based North American Wrestling Association, losing a match to Robert Fuller, which aired on July 14. In 1992, he joined Killer Kowalski's International Wrestling Federation under the ring name "Rio, Lord of the Jungle"; the character included him banging on his chest like a gorilla and wearing a loincloth. During his early career, Wilson wrestled for the Japanese promotion WAR and the New England independent circuit. Wilson worked a try-out match for the World Wrestling Federation on an August 18, 1993, taping of WWF Superstars, facing The Brooklyn Brawler.

=== World Championship Wrestling (1995–1998) ===
==== World Television Champion (1995) ====
In 1995, Wilson was signed by World Championship Wrestling (WCW). Hulk Hogan and Randy Savage were involved in the main event feud with Ric Flair and Vader. Leading up to Uncensored, in which Hogan was scheduled to face Vader in a strap match in the main event, Hogan began hyping an "Ultimate Surprise" and showed a silhouette of a man with long hair and tassels tied to his arms, implying that Ultimate Warrior was the man in question. On March 19 at Uncensored, Wilson, under the ring name The Renegade, was billed by Hogan as "the man that's gonna bring Hulkamania into the 21st Century."

Soon after his debut, The Renegade acquired Jimmy Hart as his manager and soon defeated several heels while utilizing mannerisms, moves and entrance music very similar to Ultimate Warrior's. On June 18, 1995, Renegade defeated Arn Anderson for the World Television Championship at The Great American Bash, his first and only championship. The following month at Bash at the Beach, Renegade defeated "Mr. Wonderful" Paul Orndorff to retain his title for the first time. Under a month later on Clash of the Champions XXXI, Renegade again retained his title in a rematch with Orndorff. He would continue to defend his title in matches (mostly against enhancement talent) until he lost the World Television Championship to Diamond Dallas Page on September 17 at Fall Brawl.

He then went on to lose to Orndorff on an episode of WCW Main Event preceding Halloween Havoc the next month in less than two minutes. On the November 6 episode of WCW Monday Nitro, after losing to Kevin Sullivan, Jimmy Hart who had just turned on Hulk Hogan also turned on Renegade before ultimately burying him by splashing water in his face to remove his facepaint before saying, "You're not a Renegade! You're just plain old Rick! A nobody! You're nothing!"

==== Various rivalries (1996–1998) ====
Over the next few month's Wilson's career went into a gradual decline. He returned to television on the February 26, 1996 episode of WCW Monday Nitro as The Renegade, in a losing effort to Lex Luger. Upon returning, Renegade's signature facepaint and singlet were replaced with trunks and tribal armbands; his physique was also shrinking. After wrestling sporadically throughout house shows, Renegade returned on the July 1 episode of Nitro, where he teamed up with Joe Gomez and The Rock 'n' Roll Express in a losing effort to The Four Horsemen. After competing in the World War 3 battle royal, which was won by The Giant, Renegade formed a short-lived tag team with Joe Gomez in late 1996. The team was not successful, as they were relegated to being jobbers.

After their team ended in early 1997, Renegade turned heel during a match with Scotty Riggs on the March 22 episode of Saturday Night, which he lost. Renegade remained a jobber while competing sporadically on Nitro, Thunder, and Saturday Night. After a five-month hiatus, Renegade returned on the August 12 episode of Saturday Night, losing to Super Caló. Renegade would remain utilized as a jobber throughout the rest of 1997 and 1998 (as well as being used as a stunt double for the actual Ultimate Warrior during his 1998 WCW run) before wrestling the final match of his career on the December 7 episode of Nitro, which he lost to Wrath. He was released from WCW soon after. He then worked as a bouncer and was training to be a farrier.

== Personal life and death ==
Severe depression continued to increase for Wilson after being released from WCW as well as a bad financial situation, and the fact that no other wrestling companies had made any offers to him.

Wilson died of a self-inflicted gunshot wound to the head on February 23, 1999, at the age of 33. Police said that he was arguing with his girlfriend, who lived with him in the home, when he suddenly pulled out a .380 caliber pistol in the kitchen and shot himself with it.

Wilson's grave site is located at Parkhill Cemetery in Muscogee County, Georgia, United States.

== Championships and accomplishments ==
- Pro Wrestling Illustrated
  - PWI ranked him No. 245 of the top 500 singles wrestlers in the PWI 500 in 1995
- World Championship Wrestling
  - WCW World Television Championship (1 time)
- Wrestling Observer Newsletter
  - Worst Wrestler (1995)

== See also ==
- List of premature professional wrestling deaths
