= The Great American Bash (1992) =

World Championship Wrestling pay-per-view event

- Promotional poster featuring Sting and Big Van Vader
- Promotion: World Championship Wrestling
- Date: July 12, 1992
- City: Albany, Georgia
- Venue: Albany Civic Center
- Attendance: 8,000
- Buy rate: 70,000
- Tagline: The Battle Beyond The Belt!

Pay-per-view chronology
← Previous; Beach Blast	Next → Halloween Havoc

The Great American Bash chronology
← Previous; 1991	Next → 1995

The 1992 Great American Bash was a professional wrestling pay-per-view event produced by World Championship Wrestling (WCW). It was the fourth annual Great American Bash under the WCW banner and the eighth annual Great American Bash event overall. The event took place on July 12, 1992, at the Albany Civic Center in Albany, Georgia. It was the last Great American Bash held until 1995.

Seven matches were contested at the event. The event featured a tag team tournament for the newly created NWA World Tag Team Championship. Miracle Violence Connection (Terry Gordy and Steve Williams) defeated Dustin Rhodes and Barry Windham in the finals to win the tournament and to be crowned the first champions. From this point onwards, the WCW and NWA World Tag Team Championships were considered to be unified and were defended together by Miracle Violence Connection and subsequent champions until WCW withdrew from the NWA in 1993. Aside from the tag team tournament, the WCW World Heavyweight Championship was also defended at the event. Sting defended the title against Big Van Vader. Vader defeated Sting to win the title.

== Production ==
=== Background ===
The Great American Bash is a professional wrestling event established in 1985. It was first produced by the National Wrestling Alliance's (NWA) Jim Crockett Promotions (JCP) and aired on closed-circuit television before becoming a pay-per-view event in 1988; JCP was rebranded as World Championship Wrestling (WCW) later that same year. WCW then seceded from the NWA in 1991. The 1992 event was the fourth annual Great American Bash event promoted by WCW and eighth annual overall. The event took place on July 12, 1992, at the Albany Civic Center in Albany, Georgia.

=== Storylines ===
The event featured wrestlers from pre-existing scripted feuds and storylines. Wrestlers portrayed villains, heroes, or less distinguishable characters in the scripted events that built tension and culminated in a wrestling match or series of matches.

Other on-screen personnel
Role:	Name:
Presenters	Tony Schiavone
Presenters	Magnum T. A.
Commentator	Jim Ross
Commentator	Jesse Ventura
Interviewer	Eric Bischoff
Ring announcer	Gary Michael Cappetta

== Aftermath ==
The 1992 Great American Bash was the final Great American Bash event held until the 1995 event. The event launched the first NWA World Tag Team Championship recognized at the NWA level and those titles still exist currently. From this point forward, the WCW and NWA World Tag Team titles were defended together until WCW seceded for good from the NWA in September, 1993.

Also at the event was the announcement of a tournament beginning on August 6, 1992 in Tokyo for the NWA World Heavyweight Championship, which had been vacant since Ric Flair left for the WWF in September 1991. During the announcement, WCW Executive Vice President Bill Watts anticipated an eventual unification with the WCW World title though the titles remained separate entities during WCW’s relationship with the NWA. The unification didn’t occur until 1994 when the big gold belt shown in the segment represented the WCW International World Heavyweight Championship.

A rematch between Sting and Big Van Vader was scheduled on August 2 though Sting was injured so a drawing was held to determine a new contender for the WCW World title. Ron Simmons won that drawing and the championship. Vader regained the title on December 30. Sting would briefly take the title in March 1993 until Vader got it back again.

== Home Video Release ==
The event was released on home video in the United Kingdom in early 1993 by Turner Home Entertainment. Although the event was edited down to two hours, it was one of the first WCW home videos to be released in the UK to include all of the originally broadcast matches.

== Results ==
No.	Results	Stipulations	Times
1^{D}	The Super Invader (with Harley Race) defeated Marcus Alexander Bagwell	Singles match	—
2	Nikita Koloff and Ricky Steamboat defeated Jushin Thunder Liger and Brian Pillman	Tournament quarter-final match	19:26
3	Hiroshi Hase and Shinya Hashimoto defeated The Freebirds (Michael Hayes and Jimmy Garvin)	Tournament quarter-final match	09:16
4	Dustin Rhodes and Barry Windham defeated Steve Austin and Rick Rude (with Madusa)	Tournament quarter-final match	19:15
5	Terry Gordy and Steve Williams defeated Nikita Koloff and Ricky Steamboat	Tournament semi-final match	21:39
6	Dustin Rhodes and Barry Windham defeated Hiroshi Hase and Shinya Hashimoto	Tournament semi-final match	14:55
7	Big Van Vader (with Harley Race) defeated Sting (c)	Singles match for the WCW World Heavyweight Championship	17:17
8	Terry Gordy and Steve Williams defeated Dustin Rhodes and Barry Windham	Tournament final for the NWA World Tag Team Championship	21:10
(c) / – the champion(s) heading into the match; D / – this was a dark match

=== Tournament bracket ===
First Round (TV)
Ricky Steamboat & Nikita Koloff
Joe Malenko & Dean Malenko
Beef Wellington & Chris Benoit
Jushin Thunder Liger & Brian Pillman
Miracle Violence Connection
Larry O'Dea & Jeff O'Dea
The Steiner Brothers
Miguel Perez, Jr. & Ricky Santana
Dustin Rhodes & Barry Windham
Arn Anderson & Bobby Eaton
Steve Austin & Rick Rude
Marcus Bagwell & Tom Zenk
Hiroshi Hase & Akira Nogami
The Headhunters
The Fabulous Freebirds
El Texano & Silver King

Quarterfinals (PPV)
Ricky Steamboat & Nikita Koloff
Jushin Thunder Liger & Brian Pillman
Miracle Violence Connection
The Steiner Brothers
Dustin Rhodes & Barry Windham
Steve Austin & Rick Rude
Hiroshi Hase & Shinya Hashimoto^{1}
The Fabulous Freebirds

Semifinals (PPV)
Ricky Steamboat & Nikita Koloff
Miracle Violence Connection
Dustin Rhodes & Barry Windham
Hiroshi Hase & Shinya Hashimoto

Finals (PPV)
Miracle Violence Connection
Dustin Rhodes & Barry Windham

^1 Shinya Hashimoto was substituting for the injured Akira Nogami.
