= List of WCW World Television Champions =

Listing of professional wrestling champions for the WCW World Television Championship

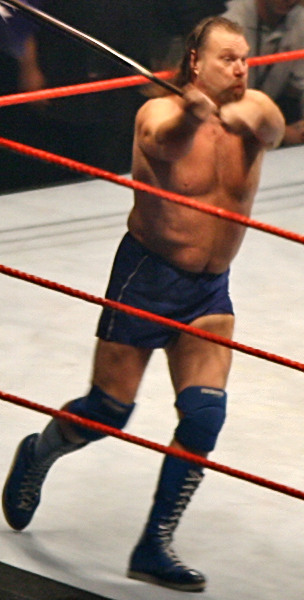
Hacksaw Jim Duggan was the final WCW World Television Champion

The WCW World Television Championship was a professional wrestling world television championship owned by the now-defunct World Championship Wrestling (WCW) promotion.

The title was introduced on February 27, 1974, in Mid-Atlantic Championship Wrestling (MACW), a territory of the National Wrestling Alliance (NWA). MACW, also known as Jim Crockett Promotions (JCP), was purchased by Turner Broadcasting System in 1988, and subsequently renamed WCW. In March 2001, certain assets of WCW were sold by AOL Time Warner to the World Wrestling Federation (WWF, now WWE). As such these assets, including the rights to the WCW World Television Championship, inactive since April 10, 2000, were now WWF property. Before it was known as the WCW World Television Championship (starting in 1991 and continuing until the title's deactivation), it was known as the NWA Mid-Atlantic Television Championship (1974 to 1977), the NWA Television Championship (1977 to 1985), and the NWA World Television Championship (1985 to 1991).

Being a professional wrestling championship, it was won via a scripted ending to a match or awarded to a wrestler because of a storyline. All title changes occurred at JCP or WCW-promoted events. The inaugural champion was Danny Miller, who defeated Ole Anderson on February 27, 1974, in the finals of a tournament. Booker T holds the record for most reigns, with six. Ricky Steamboat's second reign ended due to vacancy for unknown reasons. The day on which the reign ended is also unknown, although it is known that the reign began on June 10, 1978, and came to a close sometime in 1980. As such, if the reign ended on January 1, 1980, or any later time during 1980, then Steamboat's second reign is the longest in the title's history, at over 570 days. (Note: The exact day in October 1980 Masked Superstar vacated the title during his only reign is unknown, which means that his reign lasted between 183 and 213 days.) Five different reigns are tied for the record for shortest reign in the title's history, at one day.

Jim Duggan was the last champion in his only reign. At the time, then-champion Scott Hall did not want to be champion, and after unsuccessfully trying to give the title to Kevin Nash, he abandoned the title by throwing the championship belt into a trashcan on the November 29, 1999, episode of one of WCW's television programs, Nitro. Duggan later found the championship belt in a dumpster on the February 16, 2000, episode of another of WCW's television programs, WCW Saturday Night and named himself champion. The championship was later retired on the April 10, 2000, episode of Nitro, after a storyline reboot by WCW authority figures Eric Bischoff and Vince Russo. Overall, there were 108 reigns shared among 56 wrestlers, with 11 vacancies.

== Title history ==
=== Names ===
Name	Duration
NWA Mid-Atlantic Television Championship	1974–1977
NWA Television Championship	1977–1985
NWA World Television Championship	1985–1991
WCW World Television Championship	1991–2000

=== Reigns ===
Key
No.	Overall reign number
Reign	Reign number for the specific champion
Days	Number of days held
†	Championship change is unrecognized by the promotion

No.	Champion	Championship change			Reign statistics		Notes	Ref.
No.	Champion	Date	Event	Location	Reign	Days	Notes	Ref.
National Wrestling Alliance (NWA) / Jim Crockett Promotions: NWA Mid-Atlantic
1	Danny Miller	February 27, 1974	Live event	Raleigh, North Carolina	1	72	Miller defeated Ole Anderson in a tournament final to become the first NWA Mid-Atlantic Television Champion.	
2	Ivan Koloff	May 10, 1974	Live event	Richmond, Virginia	1	59		
3	Paul Jones	July 8, 1974	Live event	Charlotte, North Carolina	1	108		
4	Ivan Koloff	October 24, 1974	Live event	Anderson, South Carolina	2	63		
5	Paul Jones	December 26, 1974	Live event	Greensboro, North Carolina	2	44		
6	Ric Flair	February 8, 1975	Live event	Winston-Salem, North Carolina	1	181		
7	Paul Jones	August 8, 1975	Live event	Richmond, Virginia	3	117		
—	Vacated	December 3, 1975	—	—	—	—	Jones gave up the title after he won the NWA Mid-Atlantic United States Heavyweight Championship on November 27, 1975.	
8	Angelo Mosca	April 14, 1976	Live event	Raleigh, North Carolina	1	77	Mosca defeated Tim Woods in a tournament final to win the vacant championship.	
9	Paul Jones	June 30, 1976	Live event	Raleigh, North Carolina	4	42		
10	Angelo Mosca	August 11, 1976	Mid-Atlantic Championship Wrestling	Raleigh, North Carolina	2	66	This title change aired on broadcast delay.	
11	Mr. Wrestling	October 16, 1976	Live event	Greensboro, North Carolina	1	23		
12	Greg Valentine	November 8, 1976	Live event	Fayetteville, North Carolina	1	22		
13	Rufus R. Jones	November 30, 1976	Live event	Charleston, South Carolina	1	50		
14	Greg Valentine	January 19, 1977	Live event	Raleigh, North Carolina	2	27		
15	Rufus R. Jones	February 15, 1977	Live event	Raleigh, North Carolina	2	48		
16	Ric Flair	April 4, 1977	Live event	Greenville, South Carolina	2	72		
17	Ricky Steamboat	June 15, 1977	Mid-Atlantic Championship Wrestling	Raleigh, North Carolina	1	119	This title change aired on broadcast delay.	
NWA Television Championship
18	Baron Von Raschke	October 12, 1977	Live event	Raleigh, North Carolina	1	144	During Von Raschke's reign, the championship was renamed the "NWA Television Championship" after he was billed as having won a tournament for all the regional NWA Television Champions.	
19	Johnny Weaver	March 5, 1978	Live event	Charlotte, North Carolina	1	21		
20	Baron Von Raschke	March 26, 1978	Live event	Greensboro, North Carolina	2	73		
21	Paul Jones	June 7, 1978	Live event	Raleigh, North Carolina	5	368		
22	Ricky Steamboat	June 10, 1979	Live event	Asheville, North Carolina	2	136		
—	Vacated	October 24, 1979	Live event	Raleigh, North Carolina	—	—	After winning the NWA World Tag Team Championship with Jay Youngblood.	
23	Masked Superstar	April 1, 1980	Live event	Raleigh, North Carolina	1		Masked Superstar won a tournament to win the vacant championship.	
—	Vacated	October 1, 1980	—	—	—	—	Upon starting to team with Paul Jones.	
24	Roddy Piper	November 1, 1980	Live event	Richmond, Virginia	1	87	Defeats Paul Jones in tournament final.	
—	Vacated	January 27, 1981	Live event	Raleigh, North Carolina	—	—	The championship was vacated after Piper won the NWA United States Heavyweight Championship.	
25	Sweet Ebony Diamond	April 29, 1981	Live event	Raleigh, North Carolina	1	7	Sweet Ebony Diamond won a tournament to win the vacant championship.	
26	Greg Valentine	May 6, 1981	Live event	N/A	3	24		
27	Sweet Ebony Diamond	May 30, 1981	Live event	Charlotte, North Carolina	2	15		
28	Greg Valentine	June 14, 1981	Live event	N/A	4	84		
29	Ron Bass	September 6, 1981	Live event	Asheville, North Carolina	1	58		
30	Ivan Koloff	November 3, 1981	Live event	Charlotte, North Carolina	3	60		
31	Jimmy Valiant	January 2, 1982	Live event	Hampton, Virginia	1	260		
32	Jos LeDuc	September 19, 1982	Live event	Charlotte, North Carolina	1	37		
—	Vacated	October 26, 1982	—	—	—	—	Leduc was stripped of the championship due to cheating.	
33	Bad Leroy Brown	November 25, 1982	Live event	Greensboro, North Carolina	1	28	Brown won a 20-man battle royal to win the vacant championship.	
34	Mike Rotundo	December 25, 1982	Live event	Charlotte, North Carolina	1	59		
35	Dick Slater	February 22, 1983	Live event	Columbia, South Carolina	1	33		
36	Roddy Piper	March 27, 1983	Live event	Asheville, North Carolina	2	7		
37	Dick Slater	April 3, 1983	Live event	Greensboro, North Carolina	2	27		
38	Jos LeDuc	April 30, 1983	Live event	Richmond, Virginia	2	23		
39	The Great Kabuki	May 23, 1983	Live event	Greenville, South Carolina	1	185		
40	Charlie Brown	November 24, 1983	Starrcade	Greensboro, North Carolina	2	(Note: The exact date on which Charlie Brown (Jimmy Valiant) lost the title during his second reign in January 1984 is unknown, which means that his reign lasted between 38 and 68 days.)		
—	Vacated	January 18, 1984	—	—	—	—	Jimmy Valiant dropped the "Charlie Brown" alias and vacated the title; aired on broadcast delay 01/21/84.	
41	Mark Youngblood	March 7, 1984	Live event	Spartanburg, South Carolina	1	21	Youngblood won a tournament final against Dick Slater to win the vacant championship.	
42	Tully Blanchard	March 28, 1984	Live event	Spartanburg, South Carolina	1	353		
NWA World Television Championship
43	Dusty Rhodes	March 16, 1985	Live event	Greensboro, North Carolina	1	43	During Rhodes' reign, the title was renamed the "NWA World Television Championship".	
44	Tully Blanchard	April 28, 1985	Live event	Charlotte, North Carolina	2	69		
45	Dusty Rhodes	July 6, 1985	The Great American Bash	Charlotte, North Carolina	2	105		
—	Vacated	October 19, 1985	—	—	—	—	Rhodes was stripped of the title due to an injury.	
46	Arn Anderson	January 4, 1986	Live event	Greensboro, North Carolina	1	248	Anderson defeated Wahoo McDaniel in a tournament final to claim the vacant championship.	
47	Dusty Rhodes	September 9, 1986	Live event	Columbia, South Carolina	3	79		
48	Tully Blanchard	November 27, 1986	Starrcade '86: The Skywalkers	Greensboro, North Carolina	3	263	This was a "first blood" match.	
49	Nikita Koloff	August 17, 1987	Live event	Fayetteville, North Carolina	1	162	On November 27, 1987 at Starrcade, Koloff defeated Terry Taylor to unify the UWF Television Championship and the NWA World Television Championship.	
National Wrestling Alliance (NWA) / World Championship Wrestling (WCW)
50	Mike Rotunda	January 26, 1988	Live event	Raleigh, North Carolina	2	335	On November 21, 1988 the National Wrestling Alliance's flagship promotion Jim Crockett Promotions was purchased by Ted Turner and renamed World Championship Wrestling (WCW).	
51	Rick Steiner	December 26, 1988	Starrcade	Norfolk, Virginia	1	56		
52	Mike Rotunda	February 20, 1989	Chi-Town Rumble	Chicago, Illinois	3	39		
53	Sting	March 31, 1989	Live event	Atlanta, Georgia	1	114		
—	Vacated	July 23, 1989	The Great American Bash	Baltimore, Maryland	—	—	The championship was vacated after a controversial finish to a match between Sting and The Great Muta.	
54	The Great Muta	September 3, 1989	Live event	Atlanta, Georgia	1	121	Muta defeated Sting to win the vacant title.	
55	Arn Anderson	January 2, 1990	Power Hour	Gainesville, Georgia	2	336		
56	Tom Zenk	December 4, 1990	World Championship Wrestling	Atlanta, Georgia	1	34	This episode aired on tape delay on December 29, 1990.	
WCW World Television Championship
57	Arn Anderson	January 7, 1991	World Wide Wrestling	Perry, Georgia	3	132	During Anderson's reign, the title was renamed the "WCW World Television Championship". This episode aired on tape delay on February 2, 1991.	
58	Bobby Eaton	May 19, 1991	SuperBrawl I	St. Petersburg, Florida	1	15		
59	Steve Austin	June 3, 1991	World Wide Wrestling	Birmingham, Alabama	1	329	This episode aired on tape delay on June 29, 1991.	
60	Barry Windham	April 27, 1992	Saturday Night	Atlanta, Georgia	1	26	This episode aired on tape delay on May 9, 1992.	
61	Steve Austin	May 23, 1992	WorldWide	Chattanooga, Tennessee	2	102	This episode aired on tape delay on June 13, 1992.	
62	Ricky Steamboat	September 2, 1992	Clash of the Champions XX	Atlanta, Georgia	3	27		
63	Scott Steiner	September 29, 1992	WorldWide	Columbus, Georgia	1	(Note: The exact date on which Scott Steiner was stripped of the title during his first reign is unknown, which means that his reign lasted between 33 and 62 days.)	This episode aired on tape delay on October 10, 1992.	
—	Vacated	January 13, 1993	—	—	—	—	Steiner was stripped of the title after he and his brother Rick Steiner left for the World Wrestling Federation.	
64	Paul Orndorff	March 2, 1993	Power Hour	Macon, Georgia	1	169	Orndorff defeated Erik Watts in a tournament final to become the new champion. This episode aired on tape delay on March 27, 1993.	
65	Ricky Steamboat	August 18, 1993	Clash of the Champions XXIV	Daytona Beach, Florida	4	32	World Championship Wrestling (WCW) withdrew from the National Wrestling Alliance (NWA) on September 1, 1993.	
66	Lord Steven Regal	September 19, 1993	Fall Brawl	Houston, Texas	1	225		
67	Larry Zbyszko	May 2, 1994	Saturday Night	Atlanta, Georgia	1	52	This episode aired on tape delay on May 28, 1994.	
68	Lord Steven Regal	June 23, 1994	Clash of the Champions XXVII	North Charleston, South Carolina	2	87		
69	Johnny B. Badd	September 18, 1994	Fall Brawl	Roanoke, Virginia	1	112		
70	Arn Anderson	January 8, 1995	Main Event	Atlanta, Georgia	4	161		
71	The Renegade	June 18, 1995	The Great American Bash	Dayton, Ohio	1	91		
72	Diamond Dallas Page	September 17, 1995	Fall Brawl	Asheville, North Carolina	1	42		
73	Johnny B. Badd	October 29, 1995	Halloween Havoc	Detroit, Michigan	2	111		
74	Lex Luger	February 17, 1996	Live event	Baltimore, Maryland	1	1		
75	Johnny B. Badd	February 18, 1996	Live event	Norfolk, Virginia	3	17		
76	Lex Luger	March 6, 1996	Saturday Night	Macon, Georgia	2	167		
77	Lord Steven Regal	August 20, 1996	Saturday Night	Dalton, Georgia	3	181	This episode aired on tape delay on August 31, 1996.	
78	Prince Iaukea	February 17, 1997	Nitro	Tampa, Florida	1	49		
79	Ultimate Dragon	April 7, 1997	Nitro	Huntsville, Alabama	1	41		
80	Lord Steven Regal	May 18, 1997	Slamboree	Charlotte, North Carolina	4	65		
81	Ultimate Dragon	July 22, 1997	Nitro	Jacksonville, Florida	2	30		
82	Alex Wright	August 21, 1997	Clash of the Champions XXXV	Nashville, Tennessee	1	32		
83	Disco Inferno	September 22, 1997	Nitro	Salt Lake City, Utah	1	42		
84	Perry Saturn	November 3, 1997	Nitro	Philadelphia, Pennsylvania	1	35		
85	Disco Inferno	December 8, 1997	Nitro	Buffalo, New York	2	21		
86	Booker T	December 29, 1997	Nitro	Baltimore, Maryland	1	49		
87	Rick Martel	February 16, 1998	Nitro	Tampa, Florida	1	6		
88	Booker T	February 22, 1998	SuperBrawl VIII	San Francisco, California	2	67		
89	Chris Benoit	April 30, 1998	Live event	Augusta, Georgia	1	1		
90	Booker T	May 1, 1998	Live event	Greenville, South Carolina	3	1		
91	Chris Benoit	May 2, 1998	Live event	North Charleston, South Carolina	2	1		
92	Booker T	May 3, 1998	Live event	Savannah, Georgia	4	1		
93	Fit Finlay	May 4, 1998	Nitro	Indianapolis, Indiana	1	41		
94	Booker T	June 14, 1998	The Great American Bash	Baltimore, Maryland	5	29		
95	Stevie Ray	July 13, 1998	Nitro	Las Vegas, Nevada	1	28	Stevie Ray claimed the title saying he was given Power of Attorney by Booker T to defend the title due to him not being allowed to compete due to injury.	
96	Chris Jericho	August 10, 1998	Nitro	Rapid City, South Dakota	1	112		
97	Konnan	November 30, 1998	Nitro	Chattanooga, Tennessee	1	28		
98	Scott Steiner	December 28, 1998	Nitro	Baltimore, Maryland	2	76		
99	Booker T	March 14, 1999	Uncensored	Louisville, Kentucky	6	56		
100	Rick Steiner	May 9, 1999	Slamboree	St. Louis, Missouri	2	127		
101	Chris Benoit	September 13, 1999	Nitro	Chapel Hill, North Carolina	3	41		
102	Rick Steiner	October 24, 1999	Halloween Havoc	Las Vegas, Nevada	3	28		
103	Scott Hall	November 21, 1999	Mayhem	Toronto, Ontario, Canada	1	8		
—	Vacated	November 29, 1999	Nitro	Denver, Colorado	—	—	Hall abandoned the title by giving it to Kevin Nash who then threw the belt into a trashcan.	
104	Jim Duggan	February 19, 2000	Saturday Night	Bethlehem, Pennsylvania	1	54	Duggan found the championship belt in a dumpster and claimed the title.	
—	Deactivated	April 10, 2000	Nitro	Denver, Colorado	—	—	The title was retired after Vince Russo and Eric Bischoff rebooted WCW.	

== Combined reigns ==
¤	The exact length of at least one title reign is uncertain, so the shortest possible length is used.

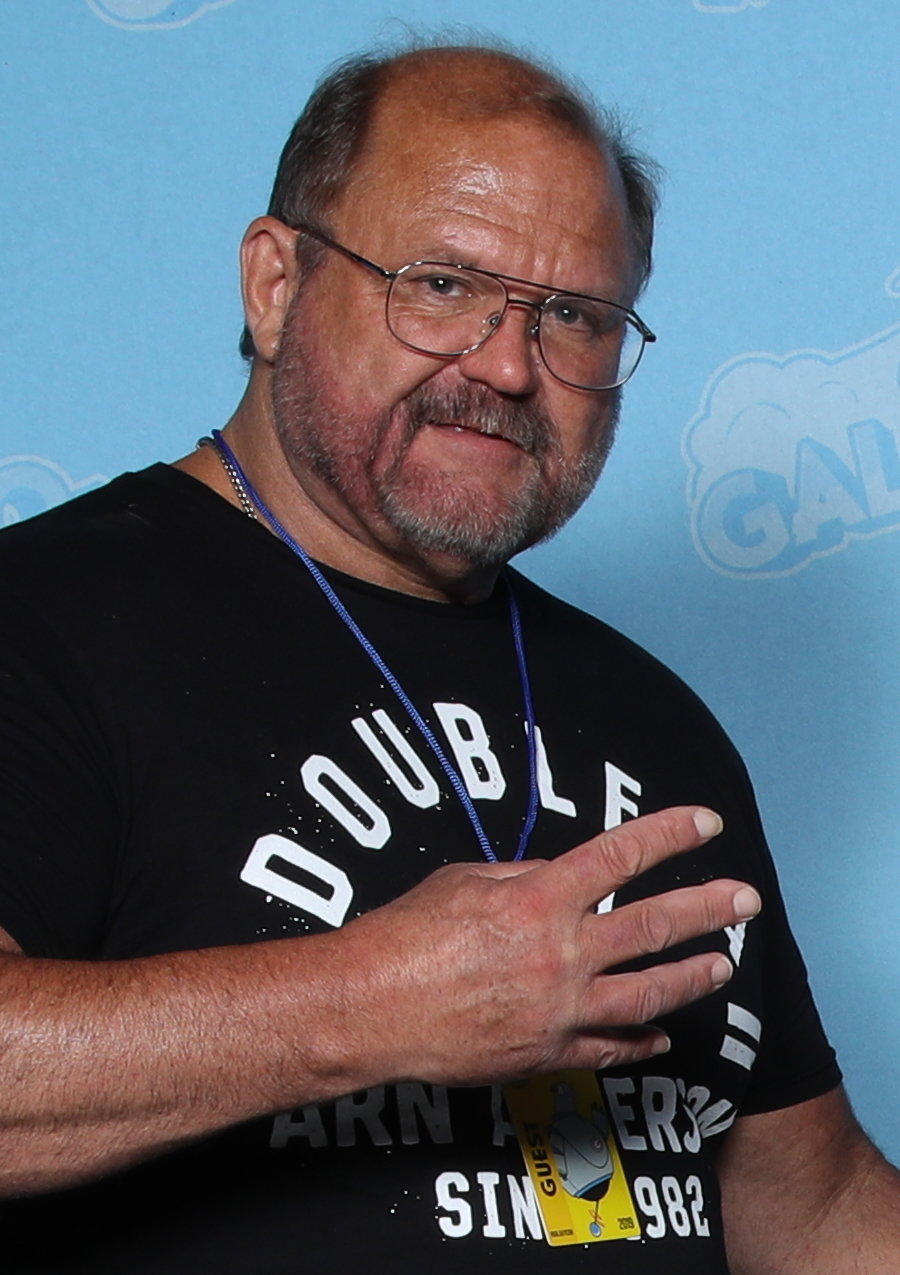
4-time Arn Anderson has the longest combined reign at 877 days.

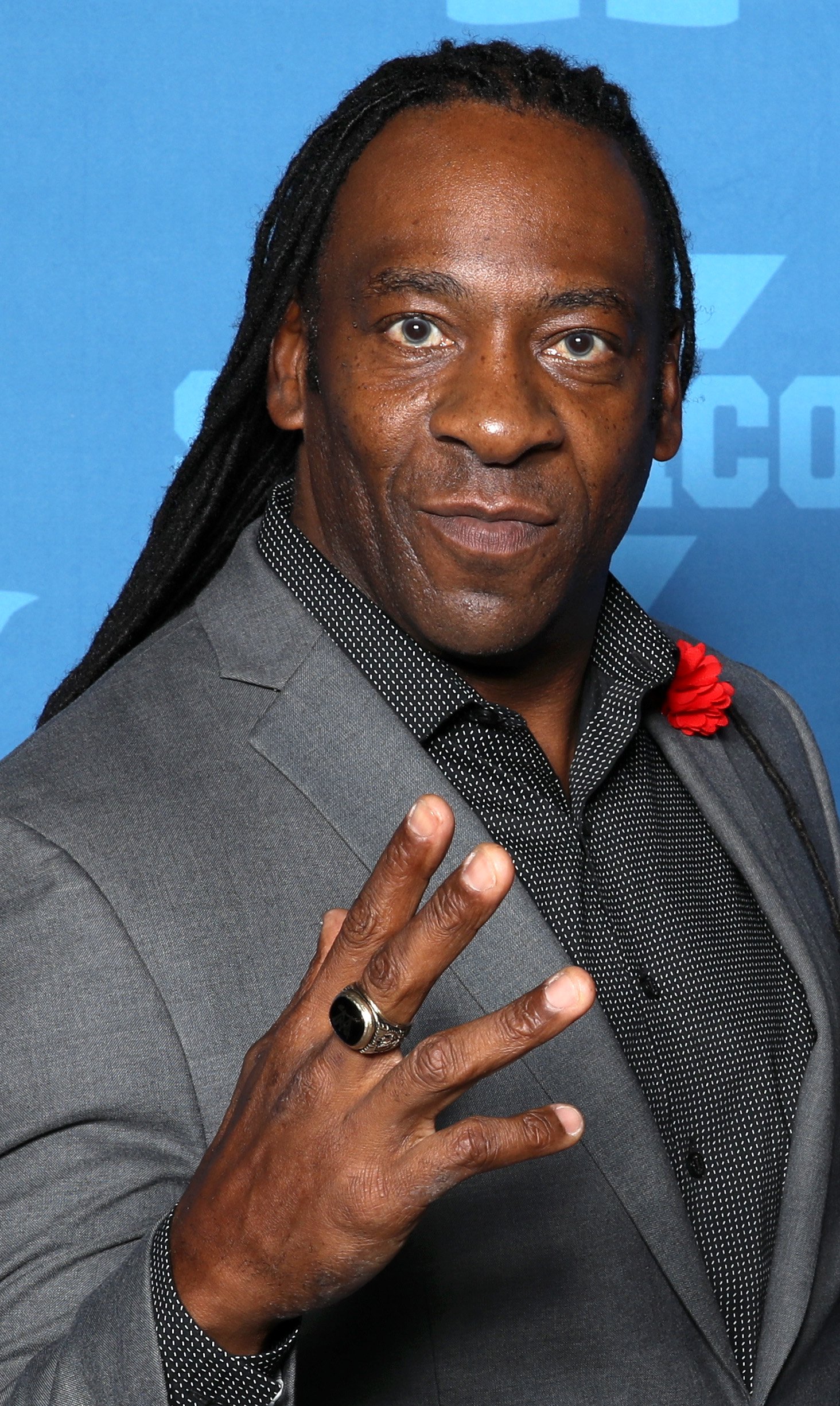
Booker T won the championship a record-setting six times.

Rank (Note: Each reign is ranked highest to lowest; reigns with the same number are tied for that rank.)	Wrestler	No. of reigns	Combined days
1	Arn Anderson	4	877
2	Tully Blanchard	3	685
3	Paul Jones	5	679
4	Lord Steven Regal	4	557
5	Mike Rotunda	3	433
6	Steve Austin	2	431
7	Ricky Steamboat	4	314
8	Charlie Brown/Jimmy Valiant	2	260¤
9	Ric Flair	2	253
10	Johnny B. Badd	3	240
11	Dusty Rhodes	3	227
12	Baron Von Raschke	2	217
13	Rick Steiner	3	211
14	Booker T	6	204
15	The Great Kabuki	1	185
16	Ivan Koloff	3	182
17	Paul Orndorff	1	169
18	Lex Luger	2	168
19	Nikita Koloff	1	162
20	Greg Valentine	4	157
21	Angelo Mosca	2	143
22	The Great Muta	1	121
23	Sting	1	114
24	Chris Jericho	1	112
25	Scott Steiner	2	108¤
26	Rufus R. Jones	2	98
27	Roddy Piper	2	94
28	The Renegade	1	91
29	Danny Miller	1	72
29	Ultimate Dragon	2	72
30	Disco Inferno	2	63
31	Dick Slater	2	60
31	Jos LeDuc	2	60
32	Ron Bass	1	58
33	Jim Duggan	1	54
34	Larry Zbyszko	1	52
35	Prince Iaukea	1	49
36	Chris Benoit	3	43
37	Diamond Dallas Page	1	42
38	Fit Finlay	1	41
39	Perry Saturn	1	35
40	"Z-Man" Tom Zenk	1	34
41	Alex Wright	1	32
42	Konnan	1	29
43	Bad Leroy Brown	1	28
44	Stevie Ray	1	27
45	Barry Windham	1	26
46	Mr. Wrestling	1	23
47	Sweet Ebony Diamond	2	22
48	Johnny Weaver	1	21
48	Mark Youngblood	1	21
49	Bobby Eaton	1	15
50	Scott Hall	1	8
51	Rick Martel	1	6
52	Masked Superstar	1	0¤
