= Craig Pittman =

Former US Marine and professional wrestler (born 1959)

- Born: March 7, 1959 (age 67)
- Years active: 1993–1998, 2011 (professional wrestling); 1995, 2011–2012 (MMA)
- Professional wrestling career
- Ring name: Sgt. Craig Pittman
- Billed height: 6 ft 1 in (1.85 m)
- Billed weight: 250 lb (110 kg)
- Trained by: WCW Power Plant; The Assassin; Terry Taylor
- Debut: 1993
- Retired: 1998
- Martial arts career
- Height: 6 ft 1 in (1.85 m)
- Weight: 250 lb (110 kg)
- Division: Heavyweight

Mixed martial arts record
- Total: 4
- Wins: 2
- By submission: 1
- By decision: 1
- Losses: 2
- By submission: 1
- By decision: 1

Other information
- Mixed martial arts record from Sherdog
- Military service
- Allegiance: United States
- Branch: United States Marine Corps
- Rank: Sergeant

Craig Pittman (born March 7, 1959) is a former United States Marine and professional wrestler. He served in the Marine Corps until the early 1990s. He then wrestled professionally as Sgt. Craig "Pitbull" Pittman in World Championship Wrestling (WCW). After leaving WCW in 1997, he continued to wrestle in independent promotions until 2004.

Prior to his professional career Pittman was a successful amateur wrestler. In addition to wrestling, he fought in four mixed martial arts bouts.

== Early life ==
In his early childhood Pittman grew up in Brooklyn, New York, but moved with his family to Freeport, New York when he was young. Pittman attended Freeport High School, where he was recruited to the Wrestling team by coach Terry Haise. In his senior year, Pittman won the state championship in Wrestling. During a subsequent trip to national championships, Pittman was offered a scholarship by University of Kentucky which he accepted. However, after Pittman's freshman year the Wrestling program was shut down and without the scholarship he was forced to return to the east coast. Back home, Pittman attended Nassau Community College where he also wrestled, again reaching the national championships where he was disqualified in the first match due to a bodyslam.

== United States Marine Corps ==
After the community college, Pittman joined the United States Marine Corps and achieved the rank of sergeant. He was a Wrestler in the Marines and won several championships. His biggest victories came in the 1989 and 1991 USA Senior Greco-Roman Championships, in which he won the heavyweight division. He also placed seventh in the heavyweight division at the 1989 FILA Greco-Roman World Championships.

== Professional wrestling career ==
=== World Championship Wrestling (1993 - 1997) ===
==== Undefeated streak and feuding with Cobra (1993–1995) ====
After leaving the military, Pittman trained as a professional wrestler at the WCW Power Plant under Terry Taylor and The Assassin in 1993. Pittman made his wrestling debut as Sgt. Craig Pittman, a villainous character at a live event on February 5, 1994. He won his first match by pinning Brian Anderson just before the time limit expired. He made his televised debut as one of the judges for Marquess of Queensberry Rules between Ric Flair and Lord Steven Regal on the April 30 episode of Worldwide. His first televised match was on the November 5 episode of Pro by defeating Ken Kendall. His character was repackaged in early 1995 and vignettes promoting his debut aired on television beginning with the February 19 episode of Worldwide. He made his televised re-debut by defeating Todd Morton on the February 26 episode of Worldwide. Pittman made his pay-per-view debut at The Great American Bash, against "Hacksaw" Jim Duggan, which he lost by disqualification when he refused to let go of the Code Red when Duggan was in the ropes. This marked Pittman's first loss but he remained undefeated as he was not pinned or submitted.

Pittman began his first feud against Cobra in the summer of 1995. According to the storyline, he had been Cobra's commanding officer during the Gulf War. During a mission, he left Cobra behind, which led to Cobra seeking revenge in WCW. This feud led to a match between the two at Fall Brawl, which Pittman won by submission after attacking him from behind before the match while a recruit of Pittman distracted Cobra. However, Pittman lost a rematch to Cobra on the September 23 episode of Saturday Night, thus ending Pittman's undefeated streak in WCW. In November 1995, Pittman also appeared at WCW's first World War 3 pay-per-view. In a sixty-man battle royal, he became the forty-second wrestler eliminated when Hugh Morrus threw him over the top rope. Following the pay-per-view, Pittman began a quest to find a manager to guide his career. After propositioning the likes of Jimmy Hart, Bobby Heenan, and Steve McMichael, Pittman connected with Teddy Long, turning face in the process.

==== Mid-card competitor (1996–1997) ====
In 1996, Pittman wrestled mainly as a mid-carder, losing most of his matches to main event wrestlers. He received his first opportunity for the World Heavyweight Championship against Ric Flair on the March 23 episode of Saturday Night, where Flair retained the title. He made two final pay-per-view appearances in 1996. The first came at Slamboree 1996 as part of a "Lethal Lottery" tournament. In a storyline in which wrestlers were supposedly assigned partners in a random drawing, Pittman teamed with Scott Steiner in a loss to Rick Steiner and The Booty Man., in fall 1996, Pittman quietly turned heel again and dropped Long as his manager, Pittman also appeared at 1996's World War 3 as part of the sixty-man battle royal, which was won by The Giant.

Pittman would go on to wrestle in WCW through the first 5 months of 1997, gaining opportunities at the United States Heavyweight Championship against Eddie Guerrero on Saturday Night on March 4, and his final match in WCW taking place on the 24th of May on Saturday Night, a shot at the World Television Championship against Lord Steven Regal.

=== Independent circuit (1997 - 2004) ===
Pittman left WCW in mid-1997 for the National Wrestling Alliance's Mid-Atlantic area. Pittman arrived in Florida Underground Wrestling for several months finally coming out of retirement to defeat "The Cuban Assassin" Fidel Sierra.

On the July 10, 1998, Sgt. Craig Pittman would receive a shot at the NWA World Heavyweight Championship, battling and losing to the champion at the time Dan "The Beast" Severn. Afterwards he retired from wrestling.

In June 2011, Pittman came out of retirement to wrestle in two MMA style shoot fights both against Brent Dali in which in Pittman won both for Florida Underground Wrestling.

== Mixed martial arts record ==
Pittman also had four mixed martial arts bouts. He fought in Vale Tudo Japan 1995 a mixed martial arts competition that took place in Japan on April 20, 1995. The tournament was ultimately won by Rickson Gracie. Pittman won his first fight against ninjitsu practitioner Wayne Emons by arm triangle choke. His lost his second fight against Yuki Nakai, a 150 lb shoto practitioner, by armbar. Vale Tudo Japan 1995 was well documented in the documentary Choke, a 98-minute film by filmmaker Robert Goodman which follows three of the participants (Rickson Gracie, Todd Hays and Koichiro Kimura) as they prepared for and fought in the event.

On October 1, 2011, Pittman competed at Real Fighting Championships 25 in Tampa Florida losing a Unanimous Decision to Rodney Bell.

On October 13, 2012, competed at Operation Octagon 21 in Sterling, Virginia where be beat Tony Horn by Unanimous Decision.

His MMA record currently stands at 2-2.

Res.	Record	Opponent	Method	Event	Date	Round	Time	Location	Notes
Win	2–2	(United States) Tony Horn	Decision (unanimous)	Operation Octagon 21	October 13, 2012	3	5:00	Sterling, Virginia, United States	
Loss	1–2	(United States) Rodney Bell	Decision (unanimous)	Real Fighting Championships 25	October 1, 2011	3	5:00	Tampa, Florida, United States	
Loss	1–1	(Japan) Yuki Nakai	Submission (armbar)	Vale Tudo Japan 1995	April 20, 1995	2	7:32	Tokyo, Japan	
Win	1–0	(United States) Wayne Emons	Submission (arm-triangle choke)	Vale Tudo Japan 1995	April 20, 1995	1	2:12	Tokyo, Japan	

== Championships and accomplishments ==
- Amateur Wrestling
  - USA Senior Greco-Roman Champion (2 times; 1989 and 1991)
