= Blue Bloods (professional wrestling) =

Professional wrestling stable

Tag team
- Members: "Lord" Steven Regal "Earl" Robert Eaton "Squire" David Taylor; Jeeves (butler)
- Name(s): Blue Bloods; William Regal and Dave Taylor
- Billed heights: Regal: 6 ft 2 in (1.88 m); Eaton: 6 ft 0 in (1.83 m); Taylor: 6 ft 3 in (1.91 m)
- Combined billed weight: 723 lb (328 kg; 51.6 st)
- Billed from: England
- Former members: Jean-Paul Levesque
- Debut: 1995
- Disbanded: 17 June 2007
- Years active: 1995–2000; 2006–2007

The Blue Bloods was a heel professional wrestling stable in World Championship Wrestling (WCW) who consisted of "Lord" Steven Regal, "Earl" Robert Eaton, and "Squire" David Taylor, along with their butler Jeeves, who operated in the middle to late 1990s.

== History ==
=== World Championship Wrestling (1995–2000) ===
The Blue Bloods were formed in 1995 in WCW by Regal after he split with his manager, Sir William, and became a tag team wrestler. Originally, Regal scouted Jean-Paul Levesque, and they were slated to be a tag team before Levesque left to join the World Wrestling Federation (WWF). Eventually, Regal recruited Alabama-born Bobby Eaton, getting him (kayfabe) "knighted" and renaming him "Earl Robert Eaton". Regal took it upon himself to teach Eaton the finer points of the British lifestyle, including the Queen's English and proper dining etiquette.

The team feuded with Harlem Heat (Booker T and Stevie Ray) and the team of Bunkhouse Buck and Dick Slater over the WCW World Tag Team Championship, but never got their hands on the titles. Later they were joined by "Squire" David Taylor and a butler named Jeeves, whom they openly abused. Eaton eventually left the group, leaving Taylor and Regal to feud with him.

Taylor and Regal continued to team together until Regal was released from WCW in February 1998 and went to the WWF, as at which point Taylor went on to compete in the singles division and later teamed with Fit Finlay.

When Regal returned to WCW in July 1999 after being fired from WWF, Regal and Taylor would reform the Blue Bloods in August. They would compete primarily on WCW Saturday Night, until the team disappeared from television in January 2000.

=== Memphis Championship Wrestling (2000) ===
On 23 August 2000, Taylor and Regal worked a match for WWF developmental territory Memphis Championship Wrestling. Wrestling only once, in a losing effort to the MCW Southern Tag Team Champions Mean Street Posse (Rodney and Pete Gas). Taylor got a contact from the WWF and was sent down to Heartland Wrestling Association another developmental territory of the WWF in Ohio. He left the company in October 2001. Regal would work full time for the WWF winning the WWF European Championship four times and WWF Intercontinental Championship twice.

=== World Wrestling Entertainment (2006–2007) ===
In October 2006, Regal (with his ring name changed to William) and Taylor reunited as a tag team on the SmackDown brand of World Wrestling Entertainment, however they used no parts of their previous "Blue Bloods" gimmick, instead becoming sadistic fighters, willing to go to just about any lengths for a win. Taylor and Regal's tag team ended on 17 June 2007 when Regal was drafted to Raw during the Supplemental Draft.

=== Split ===
After Regal went to Raw, Taylor stayed on SmackDown! and began teaming with Paul Burchill at house shows and dark matches. In October 2007, Taylor began teaming with Drew McIntyre and acting as his mentor. Taylor wrestled his last match with the WWE in December of that year and went on a leave of absence from WWE television. He was released by WWE on 28 April 2008. Taylor retired from wrestling in 2012. Return for only two more matches in 2017 and 2019.

Regal stayed with WWE working as the General manager for the Raw brand, and won the 2008 King of the Ring. He also had stints as the on-screen commissioner, and the official match coordinator for the 2011 season of the original NXT. Regal retired form wrestling in 2013. As NXT became WWE's developmental brand, he appeared as the on-screen General Manager and served as WWE's Director of Talent Development and Head of Global Recruiting from 2018 until his release in January 2022.

== Championships and accomplishments ==
- World Championship Wrestling
  - WCW World Television Championship (4 times) – Regal
