= Arn Anderson =

American professional wrestler, road agent, and author

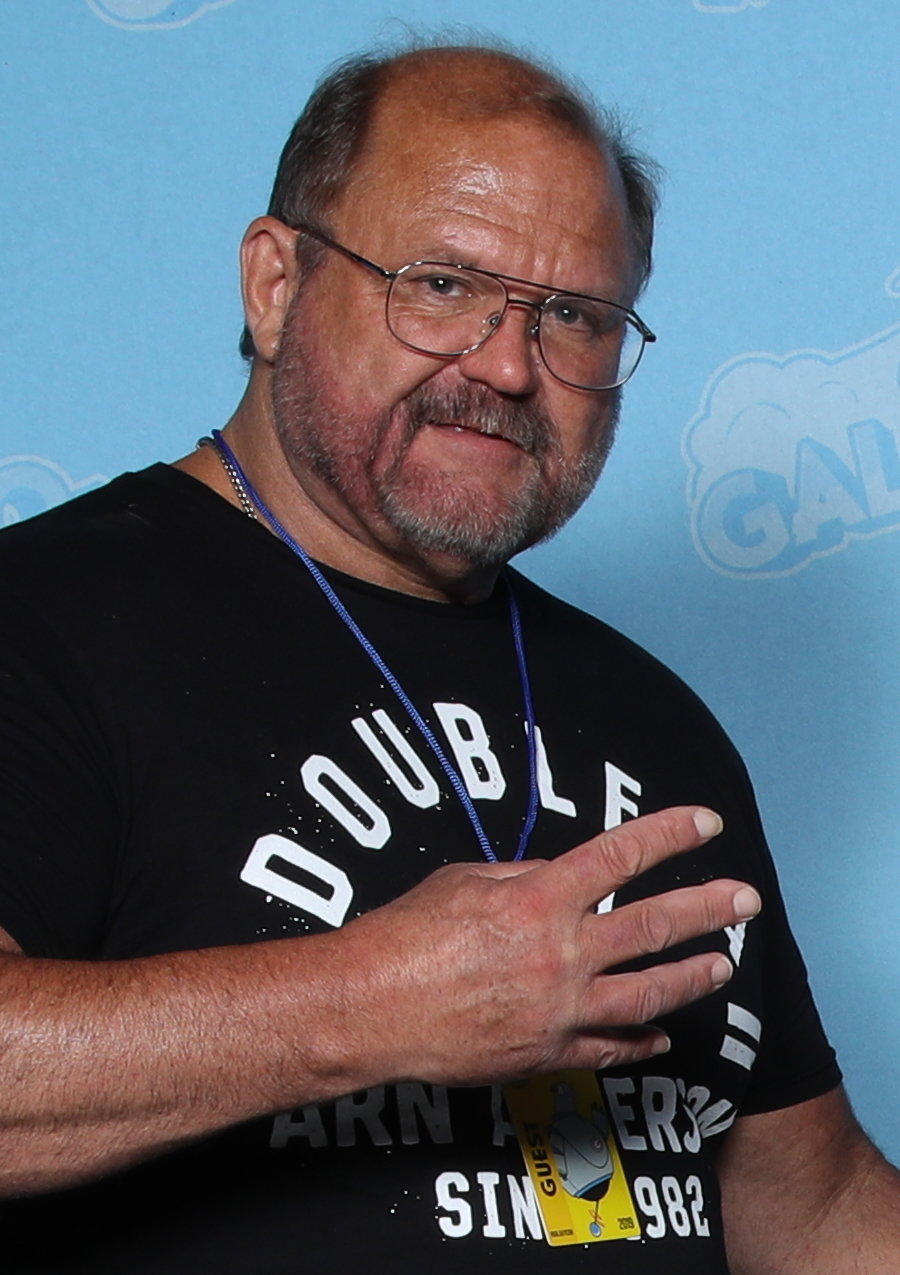
- Anderson in 2019

Personal information
- Born: Martin Anthony Lunde; September 20, 1958 (age 68) Rome, Georgia, U.S.
- Spouse: Erin Lunde (m. 1985)
- Children: 2, including Brock

Professional wrestling career
- Ring name(s): Arn Anderson; Super Olympia; Marty Lunde; Jim Vertaroso
- Billed height: 6 ft 1 in (185 cm)
- Billed weight: 255 lb (116 kg)
- Billed from: Minneapolis, Minnesota
- Trained by: Ted Allen
- Debut: December 16, 1981
- Retired: May 16, 2000

Martin Anthony Lunde (born September 20, 1958), better known by his ring name Arn Anderson, is an American retired professional wrestler, professional wrestling road agent, and author. Although he is widely regarded as one of the greatest tag team wrestlers in history, he also had a successful singles career and became a four-time NWA/WCW World Television Champion, which he often called his "world title".

Anderson's career was highlighted by his alliances with Ric Flair and various members of the wrestling stable The Four Horsemen in the National Wrestling Alliance (NWA) and World Championship Wrestling (WCW). After his retirement, he worked as a producer for WWE until 2019, when he joined All Elite Wrestling (AEW). On March 31, 2012, Anderson was inducted into the WWE Hall of Fame as a member of the Four Horsemen. His son, Brock Anderson also pursued a career in professional wrestling.

== Early life ==
Martin Anthony Lunde was born in Rome, Georgia, on September 20, 1958.

== Professional wrestling career ==
=== Early career (1981–1984) ===
Lunde was trained by Ted Allen. He debuted on December 16, 1981, in Georgia Championship Wrestling. He briefly wrestled under the ring name "Jim Vertaroso" before changing to "Marty Lunde" in 1982. He spent much of the year wrestling in various independent wrestling companies across the United States, including a minor run in Mid South Wrestling based out of Shreveport for Bill Watts from 1982 to 1983.

In April 1983, Lunde returned to Georgia Championship Wrestling, where he was given the ring name "Arn Anderson" due to his resemblance to veteran wrestler Ole Anderson, who was presented as being his uncle. He was put into a tag team, "Destruction Inc.", with Matt Borne, managed by Paul Ellering. The team were pushed strongly throughout mid-1983. In June 1983, Borne was abruptly fired from GCW due to legal issues, and the team immediately disbanded, with the newly-formed Road Warriors replacing them as the promotion's top team under Ellering.

By the middle of 1983, Lunde made his way to Southeastern Championship Wrestling, a National Wrestling Alliance-affiliated promotion operating out of Tennessee and Alabama. Taking the name of "Super Olympia", Lunde soon became a member of Ron Fuller's Stud Stable before the year was out. Lunde saw success in the tag team ranks by winning the NWA Southeastern Tag Team Championship three times with Mr. Olympia and once with Pat Rose throughout 1984. It was also here in this promotion that Lunde met and began what would become a lifelong friendship with Ric Flair.

At the end of 1984, Lunde left Southeastern Championship Wrestling and re-joined Mid South Wrestling. Lunde's time in Mid South was coming to an end, and during a TV taping the Junkyard Dog mentioned to Bill Watts, the owner of Mid South Wrestling, that Lunde looked like an Anderson. Watts called Jim Crockett and convinced him to book Lunde.

=== Jim Crockett Promotions / World Championship Wrestling (1985–1988) ===
==== Minnesota Wrecking Crew (1985) ====
In March 1985, Lunde made his way to Jim Crockett Jr.'s Mid-Atlantic Championship Wrestling, based in the Virginias and the Carolinas. By this time, the company extended its range into Georgia after rival promoter Vince McMahon purchased Georgia Championship Wrestling. There was a strong physical resemblance between Lunde and Ole Anderson, who had achieved legendary status in the Georgia and Mid-Atlantic territories as a tag team wrestler. Ole noticed that Lunde's style was a no nonsense approach in the ring and specialized in working over a part of an opponent's body throughout the match, much like Ole himself. Anderson agreed to work with Lunde, helping to hone his capabilities, and re-formed the Minnesota Wrecking Crew with Lunde replacing Gene Anderson and being presented as Ole's kayfabe brother. The team quickly became a force in the territory by capturing the NWA National Tag Team Championship in March 1985. Arn and Ole defended the titles throughout the year, with their highest profile match being part of the card for Starrcade '85: The Gathering on Thanksgiving night. The Crew successfully defended the titles against Wahoo McDaniel and Billy Jack Haynes.

==== The Four Horsemen (1985–1988) ====
"Not since the Four Horsemen of the Apocalypse have so few wreaked so much havoc on so many." - Arn Anderson, 1985

In the latter half of 1985, the Andersons formed a loose knit alliance with fellow heels Tully Blanchard and Ric Flair, as they began to have common enemies. The origin of the stable dates to a Jim Crockett Promotions taping which was held in The Omni in Atlanta, Georgia in September 1985. During the event, Ric Flair turned on Dusty Rhodes after Rhodes saved him from a beatdown at the hands of the Koloffs and Krusher Kruschev, with Arn and Ole Anderson then entering the ring and assisting Flair in breaking Rhodes' ankle and putting him out of action. As Rhodes was attempting to surrender his NWA Television Title, which was vacated on October 19, 1985, Arn, who desired the title, would recruit Tully Blanchard, with the two then kicking Dusty's crutches away, with Arn then stealing the title. On the October 26, 1985 episode of NWA Worldwide, Arn, who had possession of the stolen NWA Television Championship, called himself, Ole, Tully and Flair "The four horses, the four people that make things happen." The foursome frequently teamed together in six-man, and sometimes, eight-man tag matches or interfered in each other's matches to help score a victory or, at least, to prevent each other from losing their titles. The alliance quickly became a force within the territory, working in feuds against some of the biggest stars in the company like Dusty Rhodes, Magnum T. A., the Road Warriors and the Rock 'n' Roll Express.

At Starrcade '85: The Gathering in November 1985, the Andersons successfully defended the NWA National Tag Team Championship against Billy Jack Haynes and Wahoo McDaniel. Anderson also saw success as a singles wrestler on January 4, 1986, by winning the vacant NWA Television Championship. Simultaneously, Anderson was still one half of the NWA National Tag Team Champions and, even though Crockett promotions abandoned the National Tag titles in March, Anderson's success as a dual champion elevated his status within the territory. It was also during this time (in 1986) that the Andersons, Blanchard, and Flair began calling themselves The Four Horsemen with J. J. Dillon serving as the group's manager.

Anderson also had a tremendous ability to do interviews to further the storylines he participated in. His ability to improvise in interviews allowed him to coin the "Four Horsemen" moniker for the stable, as he likened their coming to wrestle at an event and the aftermath of their wrath as being akin to the Four Horsemen of the Apocalypse, and the name stuck. Anderson continued his reign as NWA Television Champion for most of the year, holding the championship for just over 9 months before losing it to Dusty Rhodes on September 9, 1986.

The first real setback with the Horsemen occurred at Starrcade '86: The Skywalkers in November 1986 after Anderson and Ole lost a steel cage match to the Rock 'n' Roll Express, with Ole getting pinned. The subsequent storyline positioned Ole as the weak link within the team, possibly attributed to his age. Ole's position with the group was only further weakened after he decided to take two months off after Starrcade. After Ole's return in February 1987, the other Horsemen turned on him and threw him out of the group, resulting in Ole incurring numerous attacks over the next several months. Afterwards, Ole was replaced with Lex Luger and the Horsemen resumed their dominance of the company.

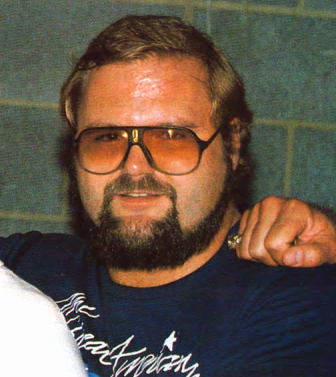
Anderson, c. 1987

As a member of the Horsemen, Anderson continued to be involved in high-profile angles within the company. By mid-1987, Anderson and fellow Horsemen Tully Blanchard began regularly competing as a tag team and rose quickly through the tag team ranks. The duo faced the Rock 'n' Roll Express for the NWA World Tag Team Championship on September 29, 1987, and were victorious. This win further solidified the group's dominance in the company as Lex Luger was the reigning NWA United States Heavyweight Champion and Ric Flair spent most of 1987 as the NWA World Heavyweight Champion, losing it to Ron Garvin in September, only to regain it at Starrcade '87: Chi-Town Heat on Thanksgiving night. Anderson and Tully continued to feud throughout the rest of the year and first few months of 1988 with the Road Warriors, the Rock 'n' Roll Express and the Midnight Express being their most frequent rivals.

By December 1987, Luger had defected from the Horsemen and began a heated feud with the group, with Ric Flair especially. In early 1988, Luger formed a tag team with Barry Windham and began challenging Anderson and Blanchard for the NWA World Tag Team Championship. The bigger, stronger team of Windham and Luger were eventually successful, winning the titles on March 27, 1988. The reign would be short lived, however, as Anderson and Blanchard regained the titles less than a month later after Barry Windham turned on Luger during their match and joined the Horsemen.

Though Anderson and Blanchard were two of the biggest stars in Crockett's company, they were frequently in dispute with Crockett over their pay. Despite the fact that the two, along with the Horsemen, were helping to generate millions of dollars in revenue for the company, they considered themselves to be underpaid. Their last contracted match with the company took place on September 10, 1988, when they dropped the NWA World Tag Team Championship to the Midnight Express before leaving for the WWF.

=== World Wrestling Federation (1988–1989) ===
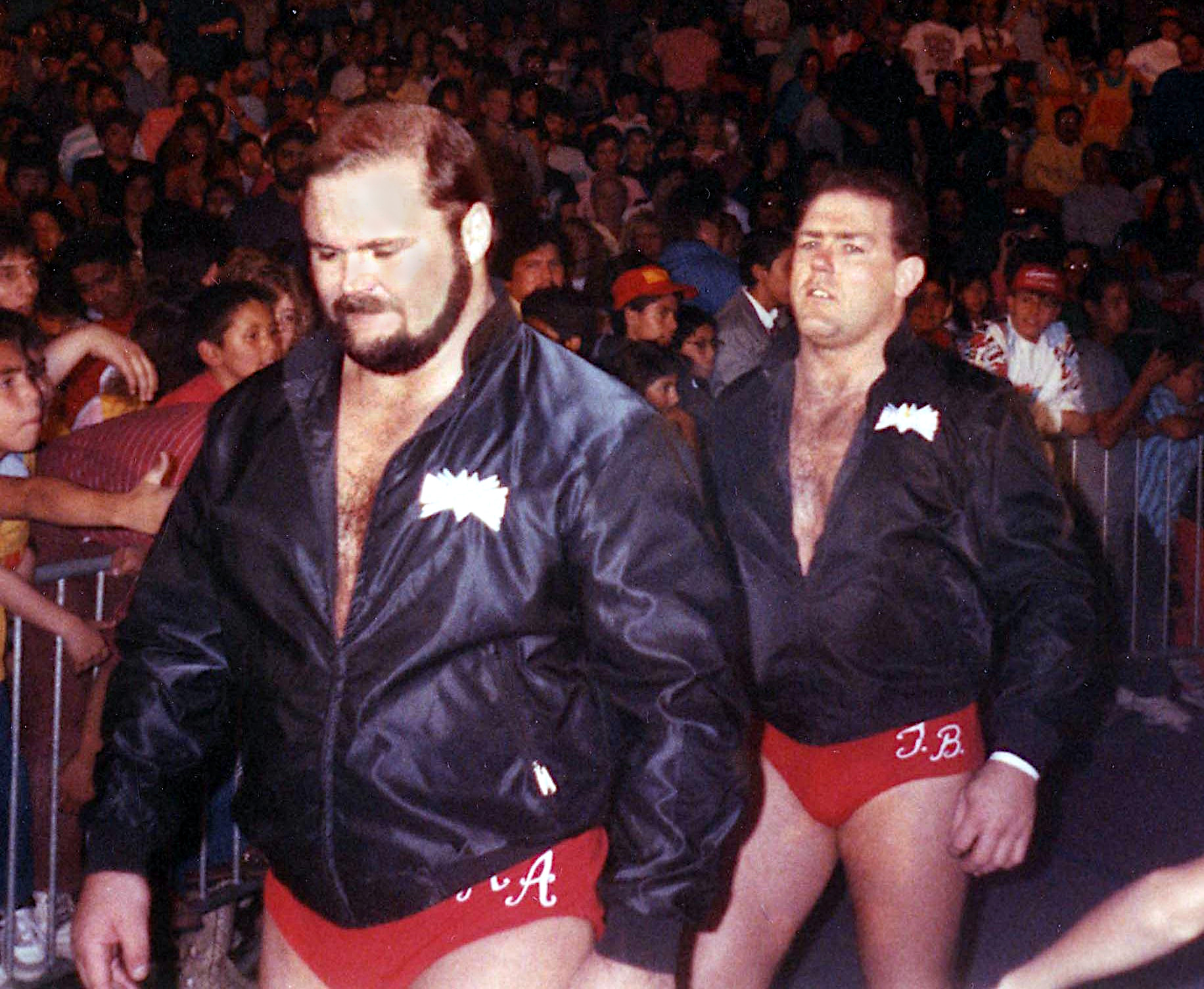
Anderson (left) with his tag team partner Tully Blanchard as the Brain Busters in 1989

Leaving Jim Crockett Promotions in September 1988, the following month Anderson and Blanchard joined Vince McMahon's World Wrestling Federation (WWF). Upon arrival, they were given Bobby "The Brain" Heenan as their manager, joining his Heenan Family stable, and dubbed the "Brain Busters". They competed in the tag team division against teams such as the Young Stallions and the Rockers. At Survivor Series in November 1988, the Brain Busters took part in a 10 team elimination match, teaming with Demolition, the Bolsheviks, Los Conquistadores, and the Fabulous Rougeaus in a loss to the British Bulldogs, Hart Foundation, Powers of Pain, Rockers, and Young Stallions. In January 1989, Anderson entered the Royal Rumble, but was eliminated by Hulk Hogan. Following the Royal Rumble, the Brain Busters wrestled a lengthy series of matches against the Rockers. At WrestleMania V in April 1989, they defeated Strike Force after Rick Martel abandoned his partner Tito Santana.

At Saturday Night's Main Event XXI in April 1989, the Brain Busters challenged Demolition for the WWF Tag Team Championship, winning by disqualification. After a series of matches against the Bushwhackers, the Brain Busters faced Demolition in a rematch at Saturday Night's Main Event XXII in July 1989, winning the titles and ending Demolition's record 478 day reign after Heenan Family member André the Giant interfered on their behalf. At SummerSlam in August 1989, they defeated the Hart Foundation in a non-title match. Following a series of title defences against Demolition, the Brain Busters lost the titles back to Demolition on WWF Superstars in October 1989. The Brain Busters faced Demolition in a series of rematches over the following weeks but failed to regain the titles.

At Saturday Night's Main Event XXIV at the end of October 1989, the Brain Busters lost to the Rockers in a two out of three falls match. Around this time, Anderson and Blanchard had given their notice to the WWF; after Blanchard failed a drug test, he disappeared from the WWF following the match. Anderson remained in the WWF to work his notice, teaming with Heenan Family member Haku to challenge Demolition. He wrestled his final match for the WWF at Survivor Series in November 1989, teaming with André the Giant, Haku, and Heenan (substituting for Blanchard) in a loss to Jim Neidhart, the Rockers, and the Ultimate Warrior.

=== World Championship Wrestling (1989–2001) ===
==== World Television Champion (1990–1991) ====
In November 1989, Anderson left the WWF and went back to WCW, where he reformed the Minnesota Wrecking Crew with Ole Anderson. Blanchard was slated to return as well but the offer was withdrawn by WCW due to Blanchard's failed drug test for the WWF, forcing Ole to step in. The following month, the Minnesota Wrecking Crew reformed The Four Horsemen - this time as a face stable - with Ric Flair and Sting. The Minnesota Wrecking Crew went on to compete in WCW's tag team division, facing teams such as the State Patrol (Lt. James Earl Wright and Sgt. Buddy Lee Parker), the Fabulous Freebirds, the New Zealand Militia, and the Samoan SWAT Team.

The reformed Four Horsemen feuded with the J-Tex Corporation/Gary Hart International. On January 2, 1990, Anderson defeated J-Tex Corporation/Gary Hart International member The Great Muta for the NWA World Television Championship. The feud culminated in a steel cage match at Clash of the Champions X: Texas Shootout in February 1990 where the Minnesota Wrecking Crew and Flair defeated Buzz Sawyer, the Dragon Master, and the Great Muta. At the same event, Sting was ejected from the Four Horsemen and the stable turned heel.

At WrestleWar '90: Wild Thing in February 1990, the Minnesota Wrecking Crew unsuccessfully challenged the Steiner Brothers for the WCW World Tag Team Championship. They challenged the Steiner Brothers on multiple occasions in early 1990, including facing them in a stretcher match, but failed to win the titles. Ole Anderson wrestled the final match of his career on April 28, 1990, teaming with Arn Anderson in a loss to Rick Steiner and Road Warrior Animal; he subsequently retired again to manage the Four Horsemen.

On December 4, 1990, Anderson lost the NWA World Television Championship to Tom Zenk. At Starrcade '90: Collision Course on December 16, 1990, Anderson and Barry Windham challenged NWA World Tag Team Champions Doom in a street fight, with the match ending in a draw. Anderson regained the NWA World Television Championship, since renamed the WCW World Television Championship on January 14, 1991. His third reign with the title was also considered successful as he held the title a little more than five months before dropping it to "Beautiful" Bobby Eaton on May 19, 1991. Afterwards, with Horsemen members Ric Flair and Sid Vicious gone to the WWF and Barry Windham having turned face, Anderson entered the tag team ranks of WCW.

==== World Tag Team Champion (1991–1992) ====
In the summer of 1991, Anderson formed a tag team with Larry Zbyszko called the Enforcers. After competing for several months and moving up in the tag team ranks, they successfully captured the WCW World Tag Team Championship on September 2, 1991. The reign would be short lived, however, as they lost the titles roughly two and a half months later to Ricky Steamboat and Dustin Rhodes. Anderson and Zbyszko wrestled their final match as a tag team in December 1991 as part of WCW's "Roar Power" tour of Europe. At Starrcade '91: Battlebowl – The Lethal Lottery that month, Anderson teamed with Lex Luger to defeat Terrance Taylor and Tom Zenk.

Also in December 1991, Anderson joined Paul E. Dangerously's new stable the Dangerous Alliance, where he formed a new tag team with "Beautiful" Bobby Eaton. They quickly moved up the tag team division and were soon a threat to Steamboat and Rhodes. Anderson and Eaton quickly won the titles on January 16, 1992, and defended the titles against all comers for the next four and a half months before losing the titles to the Steiner Brothers in May 1992. The Dangerous Alliance disbanded in November 1992 following Clash of the Champions XXI, following which Anderson took a short hiatus from WCW.

==== The Four Horsemen reunion (1993–1994) ====
Ric Flair returned to WCW in February 1993; as a result of a "no-compete" clause negotiated as part of his departure from the World Wrestling Federation, he was initially unable to wrestle, so he instead hosted a short-lived talk show segment called "A Flair for the Gold". Anderson usually appeared at the bar on the show's set.

While still under WCW contract, Anderson wrestled a handful of matches for Smoky Mountain Wrestling in March and April 1993, teaming with the Rock 'n' Roll Express. At Slamboree '93: A Legends' Reunion in May 1993, Anderson unsuccessfully challenged Barry Windham for the NWA World Heavyweight Championship.

In May 1993, Anderson joined Ole Anderson and Ric Flair to once more reform the Four Horsemen. The Horsemen introduced Paul Roma as their newest member. Although athletic and a skilled in-ring competitor, Roma had spent much of his career as a jobber in the WWF. As part of an interview segment for the Ric Flair and the Four Horsemen DVD, Triple H stated that he thought the addition of Roma made the membership the weakest in the history of the group, and Arn himself referred to Roma as "a glorified gym rat". Although Anderson and Roma won the WCW World Tag Team Championship in August, the group was seen as a failure by WCW. The stable disbanded in October 1993 after Anderson was legitimately injured in an altercation with Sid Vicious.

Anderson returned to the ring in December 1993, facing his former stablemate Paul Roma in a series of matches. In February 1994, he formed a short-lived tag team with Ricky Steamboat. In May 1994, Anderson wrestled at the Eastern Championship Wrestling event When Worlds Collide as part of a talent exchange between WCW and ECW. At the event, Anderson teamed with Terry Funk to face Sabu and Bobby Eaton; the match ended when Funk attempted to hit Sabu with a steel chair, but instead accidentally hit Anderson, causing Anderson himself to take the chair and hit Funk in the leg in retaliation, with Sabu then applying a single leg crab to Funk's injured leg, forcing him to submit.

==== Stud Stable; World Television Champion (1994–1995) ====
In May 1994, Anderson formed another new tag team, this one with Dustin Rhodes. At Bash at the Beach 1994, Anderson and Rhodes faced Col. Rob Parker's Stud Stable; during the match, Anderson betrayed Rhodes and cost him them match, subsequently joining the Stud Stable alongside Terry Funk, Bunkhouse Buck, "Stunning" Steve Austin and Meng. The Stud Stable feuded with Dusty Rhodes and Dustin Rhodes until late 1994 when Funk left.

At Starrcade '94: Triple Threat in December 1994, Anderson unsuccessfully challenged WCW World Television Champion Johnny B. Badd. He went on to defeat Badd for the title on January 8, 1995, marking the beginning of his final championship run. Anderson helped restore the prestige of the title, which he held for over six months before dropping it to The Renegade at Great American Bash 1995. He briefly feuded with long-time friend Flair, and was assisted by Brian Pillman in his efforts.

==== The Four Horsemen reunion (1995–1997) ====
In 1995, Anderson reformed the Four Horsemen yet again with Flair, Anderson, Pillman, and a partner to be named later (who ended up being Chris Benoit).

By the end of 1996, Anderson rarely competed in the ring as years of wear and tear on his body finally started to catch up with him. On the November 25 edition of Nitro, Anderson fought Luger to a double count-out in a quarter-final tournament match for the vacant WCW United States Championship.

==== Semi-retirement (1997–2001) ====
On the August 25, 1997, episode of Monday Nitro, Anderson formally announced his retirement from the ring. While standing in the ring, surrounded by Ric Flair and newest Horsemen members Steve McMichael and Benoit, Anderson declared that his last official act as the "Enforcer" for the Four Horsemen was to offer his "spot" in the group to Curt Hennig, as he was forced to retire due to extensive neck and upper back injuries. He worked a couple tag matches afterward, including teaming with David Flair on an episode of WCW Thunder, but his physical involvement was extremely limited in those bouts.

On the September 14, 1998, edition of Nitro, alongside Steve McMichael, Dean Malenko, and Chris Benoit, Anderson ceremoniously reintroduced Ric Flair to WCW after his 12-month hiatus. In doing so, they reformed the Horsemen who then feuded with WCW President Eric Bischoff. Flair won the presidency of WCW from Bischoff on the December 28, 1998, episode of Nitro followed by winning the WCW World Heavyweight Championship at Uncensored 1999 and turn heel in the process. Anderson remained Flair's right-hand man during this time as he attempted to keep Flair's delusional hunger for power at bay.

In 2000, Anderson was a member of the short-lived Old Age Outlaws. Led by Terry Funk, the group of veteran wrestlers battled the revived New World Order. On May 9, Anderson wrestled and lost to David Flair and a week later teamed with Ric Flair to defeat David Flair and Crowbar.

WCW was purchased by the World Wrestling Federation (WWF) in early 2001, ending Anderson's tenure there. He later made his return to the WWF.

=== World Wrestling Federation / World Wrestling Entertainment / WWE (2001–2019) ===
Not long after the closing of WCW, Anderson became a road agent for WWF, renamed World Wrestling Entertainment (WWE) in May 2002. He occasionally appeared on WWE television trying to, with the help of other WWE management, pull apart backstage brawls. Before the WCW/ECW Invasion storyline, Anderson took up color commentary for a WCW World Heavyweight Championship match between Booker T and Buff Bagwell, WCW Cruiserweight Championship match with Billy Kidman and Gregory Helms as well as another WCW Championship match between Diamond Dallas Page and Booker T, which would be his only appearances as a commentator in WWE. He made an appearance on Raw in 2002 delivering a video to Triple H before he was supposed to renew his wedding vows to then-heel, Stephanie McMahon. Anderson was assaulted by The Undertaker on February 25, 2002, in an episode of Raw leading up the Undertaker vs. Ric Flair match at WrestleMania X8. During that bout, Anderson made an in-ring appearance, delivering his signature spinebuster to The Undertaker. He would later turn heel by helping Ric Flair in his feud with Stone Cold Steve Austin, leading to Austin urinating on him. Anderson became a face once again on June 10, 2002, and attempted to help a then-babyface Flair gain sole ownership of WWE during a match with Mr. McMahon, but backed down from a confrontation with Brock Lesnar, who entered the ring to assist McMahon.

Anderson made a special appearance at the October 2006 Raw Family Reunion special, in which he was in Ric Flair's corner for his match against Mitch of the Spirit Squad. Anderson was in the corner of Flair, Sgt. Slaughter, Dusty Rhodes, and Ron Simmons at Survivor Series 2006, where the four faced the Spirit Squad, but was ejected from the arena during the match. On the March 31, 2008 Raw, Anderson came out to say his final goodbye to Ric Flair and thank him for his career. At No Mercy, he was backstage congratulating Triple H for retaining the WWE Championship against Jeff Hardy.

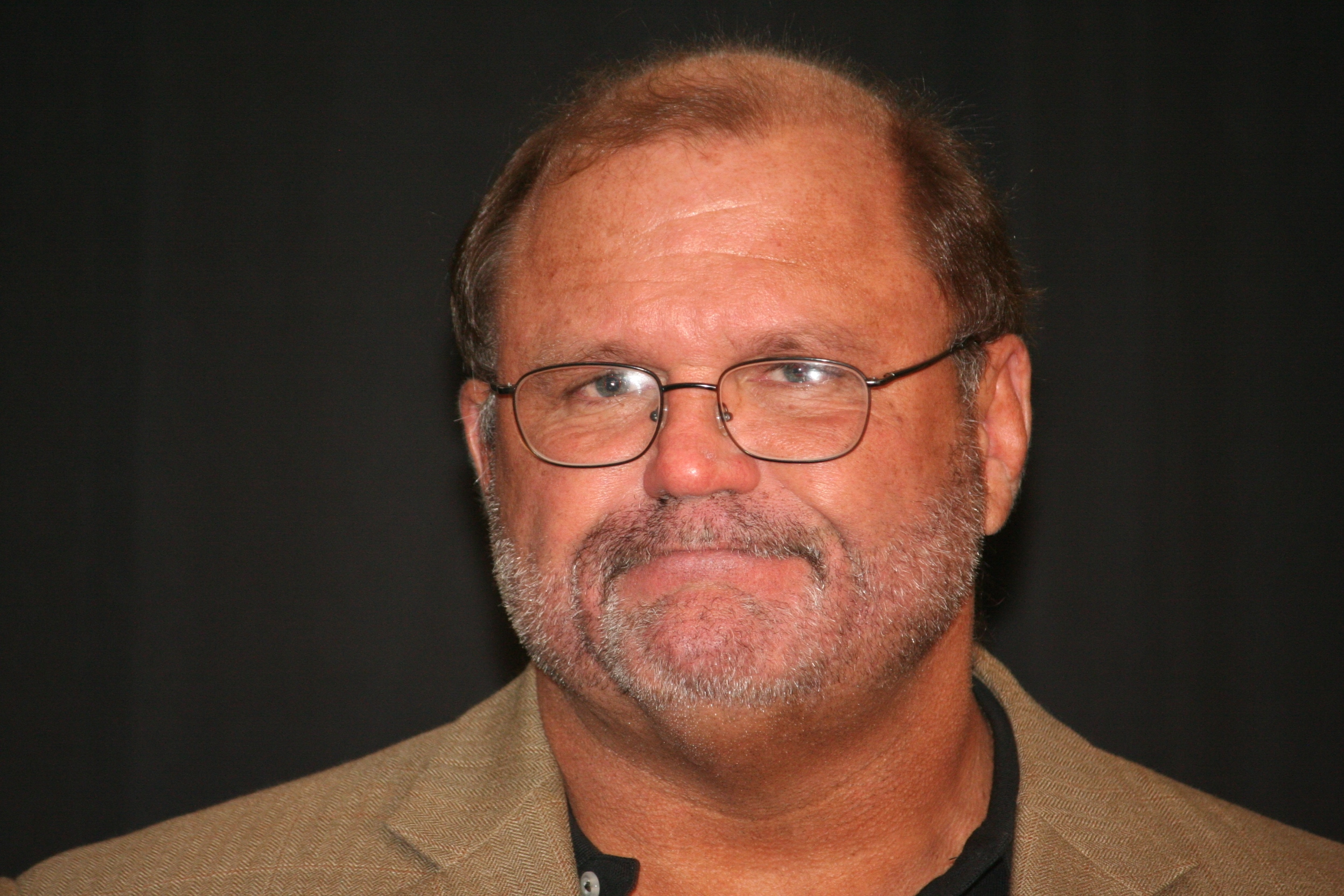
Anderson in 2014

On an episode of Smackdown Live in August 2016, Anderson made an appearance as one of the people asked by Heath Slater to be his tag team partner for the tournament to determine the inaugural winners of the WWE SmackDown Tag Team Championship. Anderson refused to help Slater upon learning that he was not Slater's first choice as a tag team partner. On the August 8, 2017, episode of Smackdown Live, Anderson made a guest appearance on Fashion Police, revealing himself to be the one who destroyed Breezango's toy horse, Tully, and boasting he was the best horse from The Four Horsemen, and that "Tully" should have been named "Arn".

On February 22, 2019, it was reported Anderson had been released from the WWE. It was later reported this was due to Anderson allowing an intoxicated Alicia Fox to wrestle a match at a WWE house show on February 10. At Starrcast II, Anderson spoke briefly about his release saying he did not want to be somewhere he was not wanted and the hours had become too much for him. He could not say much due to being bound by a non-disclosure agreement.

=== All Elite Wrestling (2019–2024) ===
On August 31, 2019, Anderson made a surprise appearance at the All Elite Wrestling (AEW) pay-per-view event, All Out, assisting Cody in his match against Shawn Spears by hitting Spears with a spinebuster. On November 6, 2019, Anderson would be a guest commentator on Dark.

On December 30, 2019, AEW announced that Anderson had signed a contract with the company as Cody's personal advisor and head coach. He would make his Dynamite debut on the January 1, 2020, episode, assisting Cody to win his match against Darby Allin. On June 3, 2020, Anderson announced that he had signed a new multi-year contract with AEW.

On the June 11, 2021 episode of Dynamite, in an interview with Tony Schiavone, Anderson, alongside his son Brock and Cody (now going under his original ring name Cody Rhodes), announced that Brock would be wrestling with AEW and would join the Nightmare Family. The interview was interrupted by Q. T. Marshall and a fight ensued. On the June 18 episode of Dynamite, Anderson accompanied Brock to the ring for his debut match. Brock, teaming with Rhodes defeated Marshall and Aaron Solow. After the match, Anderson hugged Brock and raised his hand.

On the September 29 episode of Dynamite, Anderson dumped Rhodes, who was on a losing streak, and left the ring with Lee Johnson, who had just successfully scored a winning pinfall while teaming with Rhodes. During the promo when he dumped Rhodes, Anderson (a real-life gun enthusiast) told him that Rhodes would allow a carjacker to steal his car while Anderson would "pull out the Glock, put it on his forehead, and spill his brains all over the concrete". The promo, which received approval in advance from both Tony Khan and TNT, received universal critical praise from fans and other wrestlers, as the quote got Anderson trending on Twitter; AEW promptly released a T-shirt featuring the quote due to the reaction. Additionally, the promo was sampled by rapper JPEGMafia in the song "End Credits". However, Anderson would afterwards resume coaching Rhodes, who would later go on to have another reign as AEW TNT Champion. Rhodes departed from the promotion in February 2022, which also caused the end of the Nightmare Family, but Anderson would continue to manage Brock and Johnson for the rest of the year.

On the April 19, 2023 episode of Dynamite, Anderson assisted Wardlow in his match with Powerhouse Hobbs to win the TNT Championship. Anderson and Wardlow began feuding with Christian Cage and Luchasaurus, and at Double or Nothing, he was involved in a spot where he bit the thumb of Luchasaurus. Wardlow ended up retaining the title at the event, but Anderson and Wardlow's partnership ended after he lost the title to Luchasaurus on the June 17 episode of Collision. On the August 12 episode of Collision, held in Greensboro, North Carolina, Anderson was in Brock's corner who unsuccessfully challenged Luchasaurus for the TNT Championship. Brock's contract with the promotion would expire later that month and Anderson took a backstage role as a producer.

On May 28, 2024, Anderson announced on his podcast The ARN Show that he would not be renewing his AEW contract upon its expiration on May 31, 2024.

=== Return to WWE (2024–2026) ===
On August 3, 2024, Anderson made an appearance at WWE's SummerSlam event in a backstage segment during Cody Rhodes' entrance as a part of the main event, promising Cody that he would not be facing The Bloodline alone. On January 25, 2025, Anderson was shown alongside Tully Blanchard in the crowd during Saturday Night's Main Event XXXVII. He appeared at the WWE Hall of Fame (2026) alongside Haku and The Warlord to induct Demolition.

== Personal life ==
Although he was billed as such, Lunde is not related to the Anderson family. He was given the name "Anderson" and was originally billed as Ole Anderson's brother, and later billed as Ole's nephew, because of his resemblance to Ole in appearance and wrestling style. He was also billed as Flair's cousin at various times, even though he is not related to Ric Flair, but they are long time friends.

Lunde has been married to his wife Erin since 1985. They reside in Charlotte, North Carolina, and have two sons named Barrett and Brock, the latter of whom followed in his father's footsteps and became a professional wrestler. Lunde stated on an episode of his podcast The Arn Show that the only reason he had stayed in the business for so long was to make sure Brock was able to get his start in it.

During a WCW tour of Europe, Lunde and Sid Eudy (better known as Sid Vicious or Sycho Sid) were involved in an argument at a hotel bar in the English town of Blackburn on October 27, 1993. Anderson threatened Eudy with a broken bottle; after being sent to their rooms by security chief Doug Dillinger, Eudy later came to Lunde's room and attacked him with a chair leg, and Lunde retaliated with pair of scissors. Eudy received four stab wounds while Lunde received twenty, losing a pint and a half of blood in the process. The fight was broken up by fellow wrestler 2 Cold Scorpio, who was credited with saving Lunde's life. Neither man pressed charges against the other, and British police declined to do so since both men would soon be leaving the country. Eudy was later fired over the incident.

As stated in his biography, Lunde was thrown into the ring ropes during a match in 1994. The top rope broke from the turnbuckle, but he was able to land on his feet. Six months later, the same event happened again, but this time he landed full-force on to the concrete and hit his head, neck, and upper back. He never took time off to heal. As time passed, with no down time, the injuries worsened. In his biography, Lunde states that the first sign of problems was his left arm suddenly going numb and unresponsive during a match. Doctors found that a rib, possibly torn away from the spine during the accident, was popping in and out of the joint and causing shoulder discomfort and weakness. Upon seeing his chiropractor in Charlotte, North Carolina, and consulting medical experts in Atlanta, Georgia, the damage to Lunde's body was found to be much more severe than previously thought and surgery was deemed the only option to keep his left arm functioning at all. Surgery occurred in Atlanta in late 1996 (resulting in a left posterior laminectomy of the 3rd, 4th, and 5th cervical bones and a fusion of the 7th cervical and 1st thoracic bones) and was successful in repairing most of the damage, but Anderson still has some muscle weakness, loss of fine motor control, and loss of muscle mass in his left arm. He spent many weeks in the hospital during that time, crediting his recovery to his wife, his physical therapist, and the fact he did not want his children to be fatherless. He would be readmitted in March 1997 with symptoms akin to cardiac arrest and pulmonary failure, but was released soon afterwards.

On March 11, 2023, Lunde announced on Twitter that his son Barrett had died the night before at age 37.

== Other media ==
Anderson's autobiography, Arn Anderson 4 Ever, was released on April 30, 2000.

Anderson has appeared in the video games WWE Legends of WrestleMania, WWE '12, WWE 2K16 (as DLC), and WWE 2K17 as a member of The Enforcers with Larry Zbyszko.

Anderson's podcast, The Arn Show, initially hosted by Conrad Thompson and then by Paul Bromwell, debuted in 2019.

Anderson appeared on the reality show Rhodes to the Top.

== Championships and accomplishments ==
- Cauliflower Alley Club
  - Art Abrams Lifetime Achievement/Lou Thesz Award (2016)
- George Tragos/Lou Thesz Professional Wrestling Hall of Fame
  - Frank Gotch Award (2024)
- Jim Crockett Promotions / World Championship Wrestling
  - NWA/WCW World Television Championship (4 times)
  - NWA World Tag Team Championship (1 time) – with Paul Roma
  - NWA National Tag Team Championship (1 time) – with Ole Anderson
  - NWA/WCW World Tag Team Championship (5 times) – with Tully Blanchard (2), Larry Zbyszko (1), Bobby Eaton (1), and Paul Roma (1)
- Pro Wrestling Illustrated
  - Ranked No. 9 of the 500 best wrestlers in the PWI 500 in 1991
  - PWI Feud of the Year (1987) – The Four Horsemen vs. The Super Powers and The Road Warriors
  - PWI Tag Team of the Year (1989) – with Tully Blanchard
  - PWI Tag Team of the Year (1991) – with Larry Zbyszko
  - PWI Stanley Weston Award (1997)
  - Ranked No. 62 of the top 500 singles wrestlers of the "PWI Years" in 2003
- Southeastern Championship Wrestling
  - NWA Southeastern Tag Team Championship (4 times) – with Jerry Stubbs (3) and Pat Rose (1)
- Southern States Wrestling
  - Kingsport Wrestling Hall of Fame (Class of 2001)
- World Wrestling Federation / World Wrestling Entertainment
  - WWF Tag Team Championship (1 time) – with Tully Blanchard
  - WWE Hall of Fame (Class of 2012) as a member of The Four Horsemen
- Wrestling Observer Newsletter
  - Best on Interviews (1990)
  - Worst Worked Match of the Year (1996) – with Ric Flair, Meng, The Barbarian, Lex Luger, Kevin Sullivan, Z-Gangsta, and The Ultimate Solution vs. Hulk Hogan and Randy Savage in a Towers of Doom match at Uncensored
