= WCW World Television Championship =

Former professional wrestling title

- The last WCW World Television Championship belt

Details
- Promotion: National Wrestling Alliance; Jim Crockett Promotions; World Championship Wrestling
- Date established: February 27, 1974
- Date retired: April 10, 2000

Other names
- NWA Mid-Atlantic Television Championship; NWA Television Championship; NWA World Television Championship
Statistics
- First champion: Danny Miller
- Final champion: Jim Duggan
- Most reigns: Booker T (6)
- Longest reign: Paul Jones 368 days
- Shortest reign: Lex Luger, Chris Benoit and Booker T (1 day)
- Oldest champion: Jim Duggan (46 years, 37 days)
- Youngest champion: Alex Wright (22 years, 96 days)
- Heaviest champion: Stevie Ray (289 lb (131 kg))
- Lightest champion: Último Dragón (180 lb (82 kg))

The WCW World Television Championship was a professional wrestling television championship owned by the now-defunct World Championship Wrestling (WCW) promotion.

The title was introduced on February 27, 1974 in Mid-Atlantic Championship Wrestling/Jim Crockett Promotions, a territory of the National Wrestling Alliance (NWA). Jim Crockett Promotions was purchased by Turner Broadcasting System in 1988, and subsequently renamed WCW. In March 2001, certain assets of WCW were sold by AOL Time Warner to the World Wrestling Federation (WWF, now WWE). As such these assets, including the rights to the WCW World Television Championship, inactive since April 10, 2000, were now WWF property. Before it was known as the WCW World Television Championship (from 1991 until the title's deactivation), it was known as the NWA Mid-Atlantic Television Championship (1974 to 1977), the NWA Television Championship (1977 to 1985), and the NWA World Television Championship (1985 to 1991).

The title was often defended in matches with a time limit of ten or fifteen minutes. More often than with other championships, title matches resulted in time limit draws and the champion retaining the title. This was often used as a heat-building device to allow a villain champion to retain his title. The NWA version of the belt had the logos of the major television networks in the U.S. (NBC, CBS, and ABC) on either side of the belt, though they were never featured on any of the three networks. Rival promotion WWF was featured on NBC as Saturday Night’s Main Event, but never established a TV Champion or title. The 1992–1995 WCW version of the belt had the logo of TBS, the only station on which it was ever defended, on both sides of the belt.

== Reigns ==
The inaugural champion was Danny Miller who won a tournament final on February 27, 1974. There have been 104 different championship reigns, with Booker T having the most reigns at six. The longest-reigning champion is Paul Jones on his fifth reign, Jones held the championship for 368 days from June 7, 1978 to June 10, 1979. Lex Luger, Chris Benoit and Booker T hold the record for the shortest reign each having a reign of one day. Arn Anderson holds the record for most days as champion, with 870 days over four title reigns. The last champion was Jim Duggan, who claimed the title while working as the WCW janitor after Scott Hall threw it in the garbage and he found it in a dumpster. The title was retired on April 10, 2000, after the Vince Russo-Eric Bischoff WCW reboot.
