= SuperBrawl V =

1995 World Championship Wrestling pay-per-view event

- Promotional poster featuring various WCW wrestlers.
- Promotion: World Championship Wrestling
- Date: February 19, 1995
- City: Baltimore, Maryland
- Venue: Baltimore Arena
- Attendance: 13,390
- Buy rate: 180,000
- Tagline: The World Title Is On The Line In The SuperBrawl For It All!

Pay-per-view chronology
← Previous; Starrcade	Next → Uncensored

SuperBrawl chronology
← Previous; IV	Next → VI

SuperBrawl V was the fifth SuperBrawl professional wrestling pay-per-view (PPV) event produced by World Championship Wrestling (WCW). The event took place on February 19, 1995 from the Baltimore Arena in Baltimore, Maryland.

In the main event, Hulk Hogan successfully defended the World Heavyweight Championship against Big Van Vader as Vader was disqualified due to Ric Flair's interference in the match. In the penultimate match, Sting and Randy Savage defeated Avalanche and Big Bubba Rogers. Also at the event, Harlem Heat (Booker T and Stevie Ray) retained the World Tag Team Championship against The Nasty Boys (Brian Knobbs and Jerry Sags) by disqualification.

== Storylines ==
The professional wrestling matches involved professional wrestlers performing as characters in scripted events pre-determined by the hosting promotion, WCW. Storylines between the characters played out on WCW's television programs, Saturday Night, WorldWide, Pro, Prime and Main Event.

At Starrcade, Big Van Vader defeated Jim Duggan to win the United States Heavyweight Championship. Later that night, Hulk Hogan defeated The Butcher to retain the World Heavyweight Championship. After the match, Vader confronted Hogan during a post-match interview and challenged him to a match for the title and said that Hogan was afraid of him which led to a brawl took place between the two. This led to a match between the two for the World Heavyweight Championship at SuperBrawl. On January 14 episode of Saturday Night, it was revealed by Gene Okerlund that Vader and Hogan were not allowed to be involved in any physical confrontation and be near each other before their title match at SuperBrawl. At Clash of the Champions XXX, Monster Maniacs (Hulk Hogan and Randy Savage) defeated Three Faces of Fear members The Butcher and Kevin Sullivan and then Vader confronted Hogan by hitting a Powerbomb but then Hogan rose up and cleared Vader out of the ring. On the February 11 episode of Saturday Night, Gene Okerlund conducted an interview with Ric Flair, in which Flair predicted that Big Van Vader would win the title from Hogan at SuperBrawl. He then returned to WCW on the following week's Saturday Night to announce that he would show up at SuperBrawl during Hogan and Vader's title match.

At Starrcade, Sting defeated Avalanche by disqualification after Avalanche's Three Faces of Fear teammate Kevin Sullivan attacked Sting while the original referee was knocked out and led Randy Anderson to disqualify Avalanche. On the January 7 episode of Saturday Night, Commissioner Nick Bockwinkel announced a rematch between Sting and Avalanche at Clash of the Champions XXX, with Guardian Angel as the special guest referee. Before that, the two faced each other on the January 8 episode of Main Event, where Sting won by disqualification after interference by Three Faces of Fear. At Clash of the Champions XXX, Sting applied a Scorpion Deathlock on Avalanche during the match and Avalanche submitted to the hold but guest referee Guardian Angel did not ring the bell and Nick Patrick came in to ring the bell against Angel's orders. This led to a brawl between Sting and Angel, which led to Angel turning heel and reverting to his previous name "Big Bubba Rogers". On the January 28 episode of Saturday Night, it was announced that Sting and Randy Savage would compete against Avalanche and Rogers at SuperBrawl.

Dave Sullivan was involved in a rivalry with his kayfabe brother Kevin Sullivan since late 1994 due to Kevin being angry at Dave being a fan of Hulk Hogan and Kevin tried to prevent Dave from being Hogan's associate but failed to stop Dave from doing so and it evolved into a rivalry between the two. At Halloween Havoc, Dave defeated Kevin by count-out. At Starrcade, Dave cost Kevin, a match against Mr. T by posing as Santa Claus and hitting Kevin with a sack loaded with Jimmy Hart's megaphone. After the match, Kevin attacked Dave and delivered a Piledriver to Dave. On the January 14 episode of Saturday Night, Kevin cost Dave, a match against Bobby Eaton. On the following week's Saturday Night, Kevin and Dave competed in a match against each other in which Kevin was disqualified after The Butcher attacked Dave and then Butcher cut off Dave's hair and his boots. A match was announced between the two at SuperBrawl on the January 28 episode of Saturday Night.

On the January 28 episode of Saturday Night, Paul Roma confronted Alex Wright during Wright's match out of jealousy for Wright due to Wright becoming very popular with female fans. He tried to woo a female fan with his body and looks but the fan gave attention to Wright instead of him, which began a feud between Roma and Wright. Later that night, it was announced that Wright would face Roma at SuperBrawl.

Blacktop Bully was arrested for shoving Dustin Rhodes after Rhodes defeated George South in a match on the November 26, 1994 episode of Saturday Night. Bully returned to WCW the following month. After a brief confrontation with Rhodes on the January 14 episode of Saturday Night, Bully warned Rhodes on the following week's Saturday Night that Rhodes would end up like a roadkill if they had an encounter against each other. On the January 28 episode of Saturday Night, it was announced that Rhodes would face Bully at SuperBrawl. On the February 5 episode of Worldwide, Bully attacked Rhodes during a match between Rhodes and Bunkhouse Buck.

On the January 28 episode of Pro, it was announced that Jim Duggan would face Bunkhouse Buck at SuperBrawl V. The following night, on Worldwide, Duggan defeated Buck by disqualification after interference by Arn Anderson.

At Starrcade, The Nasty Boys (Brian Knobbs and Jerry Sags) defeated Harlem Heat (Booker T and Stevie Ray) by disqualification after Sister Sherri accidentally hit a splash from the top rope on Booker. On the January 14 episode of Saturday Night, Harlem Heat defeated Stars and Stripes (Marcus Alexander Bagwell and The Patriot) to win the World Tag Team Championship and successfully defended the title against Stars and Stripes in a rematch at Clash of the Champions XXX. On the January 28 episode of Saturday Night, it was announced that Harlem Heat would defend the titles against Nasty Boys at SuperBrawl. On the February 11 episode of Saturday Night, Harlem Heat successfully defended the title against Stars n Stripes in another rematch and Nasty Boys brawled with Harlem Heat after the match.

== Event ==
Other on-screen personnel
Role:	Name:
Commentators	Tony Schiavone
Commentators	Bobby Heenan
Interviewer	Gene Okerlund
Ring announcer	Gary Michael Cappetta
Ring announcer	Michael Buffer
Referees	Randy Anderson
Referees	Nick Patrick

=== Pre-show ===
Before the show aired live on pay-per-view, three matches aired on Main Event. In the first match, Paul Orndorff defeated Brad Armstrong after dropping him face first on the top turnbuckle and using the ropes for leverage. In the next match, Stars and Stripes (Marcus Alexander Bagwell and The Patriot) defeated the team of Romeo Valentino and Dino Casanova and then Big Van Vader attacked all the wrestlers in the ring while searching for Hulk Hogan. In the final match, Arn Anderson successfully defended the World Television Championship against Johnny B. Badd in a lumberjack match after one of the lumberjacks The Blacktop Bully dropped Badd from the top rope and Anderson pinned him by grabbing his tights for leverage.

=== Preliminary matches ===
As the pay-per-view began, Alex Wright competed against Paul Roma in the opening match of the event. Roma dominated Wright throughout the match until his Pretty Wonderful tag team partner Paul Orndorff came at ringside to support Roma. Near the end of the match, Roma was distracted while arguing with Orndorff, allowing Wright to dropkick Roma into Orndorff and roll him up. However, Roma kicked out of this pinfall attempt, despite being booked to lose. The referee counted the pinfall anyway and awarded the win to Wright, no replay of the fall was shown. Roma's lack of cooperation in the match and refusal to lose to Wright led to Roma's dismissal from WCW a month later.

In the next match, Jim Duggan competed against Bunkhouse Buck. Duggan executed a clothesline on Buck to toss him out of the ring and then Duggan charged at him and ran into the ringpost. The action then returned to the ring where both men traded chinlocks. Duggan began gaining momentum until Col. Robert Parker and Meng distracted him but Duggan delivered a spinning side slam and an Old Glory and then he knocked out Parker from the apron and then delivered a three-point stance clothesline to Buck to win the match. After the match, Meng attacked Duggan and applied a thumb choke hold on Duggan.

Kevin Sullivan took on Dave Sullivan. Kevin dominated the earlier part of the match until Dave gained momentum and then The Butcher distracted him by climbing the apron, allowing Kevin to toss Dave into Butcher, who fell on the floor and had a serious injury on the head. Kevin then rolled up Dave for the victory.

Harlem Heat (Booker T and Stevie Ray) defended the World Tag Team Championship against The Nasty Boys (Brian Knobbs and Jerry Sags). Harlem Heat dominated their opponents for much of the match until Sags tagged in Knobbs and then he threw Booker over the top rope. Ray dived onto the top rope and Sister Sherri attempted to hit Knobbs with her loaded purse but accidentally hit Ray with it, allowing Knobbs to pin him to win the title. However, after the match, another referee came and disqualified Nasty Boys for throwing Booker over the top rope, resulting in Harlem Heat retaining the title.

Later, Dustin Rhodes and The Blacktop Bully competed in a match. Commissioner Nick Bockwinkel ejected Meng from ringside due to his interference and post-match assault on Jim Duggan earlier at the event. Rhodes performed a flying clothesline on Bully. The match continued as both men traded moves against each other. Near the end of the match, Rhodes performed a bulldog on Bully and covered him for the pinfall but Parker put Bully's foot on the rope. Rhodes suplexed Parker into the ring and Bully missed a clothesline on Rhodes and fell on the apron. Rhodes then tried to suplex Bully into the ring but Parker tripped him and Bully fell on Rhodes and Parker held Rhodes' foot to render him unable to kick out and Bully pinned Rhodes to get the victory.

In the penultimate match, Sting and Randy Savage competed against the team of Avalanche and Big Bubba Rogers. Ric Flair took a seat at ringside. Tenta used his strength against Sting until Sting came back with clotheslines and punches and then Bubba attacked him to slower his momentum. Savage crotched Bubba on the ropes, allowing Sting to execute a Superplex. Savage was tagged in and he was double teamed by Bubba and Avalanche until Sting tagged in and then clipped Avalanche to attempt a Scorpion Deathlock. Savage prevented Bubba from interfering and put him in the corner, allowing Sting to execute Stinger Splashes on Bubba and Avalanche. Avalanche overpowered Sting until Sting ducked a corner charge by Avalanche and slammed him on the mat and then Bubba punched Sting to weaken him down. Sting managed to tag in Savage but the referee did not see the tag. A brawl occurred between both teams and Savage delivered a diving elbow drop to Bubba but the referee ejected him out of the ring. Sting delivered a diving crossbody on Avalanche to win the match.

=== Main event match ===
In the main event, Hulk Hogan defended the World Heavyweight Championship against Big Van Vader. Hogan hit Vader with punches but Vader did not sell them and then Hogan attempted an armbar but Vader moved out of it and hit a body avalanche to Hogan in the corner. Hogan moved out of the ring and Vader ran after him and then Hogan whipped him onto the railing. The two returned to the ring where Hogan sent Vader out of the ring with a big boot and a clothesline. Hogan tried to execute a scoop slam on Vader but failed and Vader dominated Hogan with a Vader Bomb and followed with a Moonsault but Hogan moved out of it and went out of the ring. He grabbed a steel chair and hit Vader with it but it did not affect Vader and he delivered a Chokeslam. Hogan tried a comeback by performing a big boot and followed with a leg drop but got a near-fall. Vader knocked out the referee with a splash and delivered a Powerbomb to Hogan. Ric Flair got involved in the match by attacking Hogan and revived the referee and then Vader got a near-fall on Hogan with a splash. Hogan then tossed Vader out of the ring and Flair hit Hogan from behind, causing Vader to get disqualified and Hogan retained the title. After the match, Vader and Flair double teamed Hogan until Sting and Randy Savage made the save.

== Reception ==
The event received negative reviews from the critics. Arnold Furious of 411mania stated that it was a "terrible" show and wrote "The last couple of matches are pretty good but the booking is a disaster. The rest of the card sucks. Avoid."

Kevin Pantoja of 411mania gave it a rating of 2.5 stars and considered it a "very bad" event. He appreciated the main event match and the penultimate tag team match while he panned the rest of the event by stating "Paul Roma makes Alex Wright look bad, the Sullivan brothers stink up the joint and the same goes for Jim Duggan and others. Just a bad first show for an important year in WCW history."

== Aftermath ==
Paul Roma was scheduled to lose the match to Alex Wright at SuperBrawl V but kicked out of Wright's pinfall attempt at two and a half during the event, which led the WCW officials to fire Roma the following month in March. During later years, Roma revealed in a shoot interview that WCW management planned on pushing Wright as the next major star of the company and a successor to Hulk Hogan and he was critical of Wright and considered Wright of being unworthy of being the next top guy.

Hulk Hogan continued his rivalry with Vader and he demanded a Leather Strap match against Vader at Uncensored, which Hogan won.

After beating Avalanche and Big Bubba Rogers at SuperBrawl, Randy Savage and Sting earned a title shot for the World Tag Team Championship against Harlem Heat on the February 25 episode of Saturday Night, where Sting and Savage won by disqualification after Avalanche and Rogers attacked them. This led to Savage beginning a feud with Avalanche and Sting beginning a feud with Rogers. Savage defeated Avalanche and Rogers defeated Sting at Uncensored. Sting finally ended the rivalry by defeating Rogers at Slamboree.

Harlem Heat and Nasty Boys continued their rivalry after SuperBrawl. At Uncensored, Nasty Boys defeated Harlem Heat in a non-title Falls Count Anywhere match. At Slamboree, Nasty Boys defeated Harlem Heat to win the World Tag Team Championship.

Dustin Rhodes and Blacktop Bully continued their rivalry after SuperBrawl as Rhodes and Johnny B. Badd defeated Bully and Arn Anderson in a tag team match on the February 26 episode of Main Event. At Uncensored, Bully defeated Rhodes in a King of the Road match but after that match aired both men were fired for intentionally bleeding during the match when there was a strict no bleeding policy in place at the time.

Jim Duggan began a rivalry with Meng due to Meng assaulting him after his win over Bunkhouse Buck at SuperBrawl. Meng defeated Duggan in a martial arts match, with Sonny Onoo as the special guest referee at Uncensored.

== Results ==
No.	Results	Stipulations	Times
1^{ME}	Paul Orndorff defeated Brad Armstrong	Singles match	03:45
2^{ME}	Stars and Stripes (Marcus Alexander Bagwell & The Patriot) defeated Romeo Valentino and Dino Casanova	Tag team match	01:10
3^{ME}	Arn Anderson (c) defeated Johnny B. Badd	Lumberjack match for the WCW World Television Championship	04:29
4	Alex Wright defeated Paul Roma	Singles match	13:21
5	Jim Duggan defeated Bunkhouse Buck (with Col. Robert Parker and Meng)	Singles match	11:58
6	Kevin Sullivan (with The Butcher) defeated Dave Sullivan	Singles match	07:18
7	Harlem Heat (Booker T and Stevie Ray) (c) (with Sister Sherri) defeated The Nasty Boys (Brian Knobs and Jerry Sags) by disqualification	Tag team match for the WCW World Tag Team Championship	17:07
8	Blocktop Bully (with Col. Robert Parker) defeated Dustin Rhodes	Singles match	16:10
9	Sting and Randy Savage defeated Avalanche and Big Bubba Rogers	Tag team match	10:18
10	Hulk Hogan (c) (with Jimmy Hart) defeated Big Van Vader by disqualification	Singles match for the WCW World Heavyweight Championship	15:09
(c) / – the champion(s) heading into the match; ME / – the match was broadcast prior to the pay-per-view on Main Event
