= Uncensored (1995) =

1995 World Championship Wrestling pay-per-view event

- VHS cover featuring Avalanche, Hulk Hogan, Randy Savage
- Promotion: World Championship Wrestling
- Date: March 19, 1995
- City: Tupelo, Mississippi
- Venue: Tupelo Coliseum
- Attendance: 5,782
- Buy rate: 180,000
- Tagline: Unsanctioned, Unauthorized, Unbelievable!

Pay-per-view chronology
← Previous; SuperBrawl V	Next → Slamboree

Uncensored chronology
← Previous; First	Next → 1996

The 1995 Uncensored was the inaugural Uncensored professional wrestling pay-per-view (PPV) event produced by World Championship Wrestling (WCW). It took place on March 19, 1995 from the Tupelo Coliseum in Tupelo, Mississippi.

== Storylines ==
The event featured professional wrestling matches that involve different wrestlers from pre-existing scripted feuds and storylines. Professional wrestlers portray villains, heroes, or less distinguishable characters in the scripted events that build tension and culminate in a wrestling match or series of matches.

The concept of Uncensored was that it was an event that, in storylines, the (fictional) WCW Board of Directors had washed their hands of (in reality, it was a normally-booked WCW show, albeit one with a tendency to feature more gimmick matches than usual). Thus, each match on the card was ostensibly unsanctioned, meaning they were not subject to the normal rules of WCW-sanctioned wrestling matches; as a result, despite all five of the company's champions competing at the event, no titles were on the line.

== Event ==
Other on-screen personnel
Role:	Name:
Commentators	Tony Schiavone
Commentators	Bobby Heenan
Interviewer	Mike Tenay
Ring announcers	Gary Michael Cappetta
Ring announcers	Michael Buffer
Referees	Randy Anderson
Referees	Nick Patrick

All of the pre-pay-per-view matches were broadcast live on WCW Main Event. The "King of the Road" match took place in the caged-off trailer of the Blacktop Bully's 18-wheeler truck, as it was driven (supposedly) around nearby roads. The object of the match was to climb to the top of the trailer's cage and sound a horn positioned there. Bully sounded the horn to win. This match was taped days earlier outside of Atlanta, Georgia and was heavily edited due to WCW's strict no-bleeding policy in place at the time; Dustin Rhodes and Bully were subsequently fired for blading during the match in violation of the policy.

The second match saw "Hacksaw" Jim Duggan take on Meng, with Col. Robert Parker in his corner, in a "Martial Arts match"; Sonny Onoo served as the guest referee. The match ended when Parker got on the apron and Duggan confronted him; as Parker and Onoo held Duggan's arms, Meng hit Duggan with a Savate kick and got the victory.

The "Boxer vs. Wrestler" match between Johnny B. Badd and WCW World Television Champion Arn Anderson was billed as having ten three-minute rounds, with a rest period of one minute between rounds. The rules stated that Anderson (as "the wrestler") could win by pinfall or submission, whereas Johnny B. Badd (as "the boxer") could only win by knockout. Johnny won the match during round 4 at the twenty-two second mark.

Despite the event being billed as "no rules" the Avalanche was disqualified in his match against Randy Savage after a "fan" attacked Savage. The fan turned out to be Ric Flair dressed like a woman.

In the next match, Big Bubba Rogers would defeat Sting when Sting, whose knee had been weakened over the course of the bout, tried to slam Rogers; he would collapse backwards, allowing Rogers to score the pinfall victory.

The Falls Count Anywhere Texas Tornado Tag Team match between The Nasty Boys and WCW World Tag Team Champions Harlem Heat ended up in the concession stands, where the participants attacked each other with cotton candy, soft drinks and other nearby objects. The Nasty Boys won when Brian Knobbs pinned Booker T after slamming him into the debris of a destroyed funnel cake stand.

The main event was a strap match between WCW United States Champion Big Van Vader and WCW World Heavyweight Champion Hulk Hogan. Before the PPV, Hogan's manager Jimmy Hart was kidnapped and tied up at an undisclosed location by Vader and Flair. During the match Hart escaped and joined The Renegade at ringside. During the match a masked man appeared and attacked Renegade, before returning to the back. Hogan was given the win over Vader when he dragged an interfering Flair and touched all four turnbuckles (despite Flair not being the legal opponent in the match). After the match, a masked man appeared again, seemingly siding with Vader and Flair, before unmasking to reveal himself as Randy Savage and embracing Hogan, Renegade and Hart. Savage had tied up the first masked man backstage, who was then revealed to be Arn Anderson.

== Results ==
No.	Results	Stipulations	Times
1^{ME}	Alex Wright defeated Mark Starr	Singles match	02:44
2^{ME}	Steve Austin defeated Tim Horner	Singles match	01:27
3^{ME}	Stars and Stripes (Marcus Alexander Bagwell and The Patriot) defeated Dick Slater and Bunkhouse Buck (with Col. Robert Parker)	Tag team match	09:34
4	The Blacktop Bully defeated Dustin Rhodes	King of the Road match	13:06
5	Meng (with Col. Robert Parker) defeated Jim Duggan	Martial Arts match with Sonny Onoo as special guest referee	07:04
6	Johnny B. Badd (with Roc Finnegan) defeated Arn Anderson (with Col. Robert Parker)	Boxing match	09:22
7	Randy Savage defeated Avalanche by disqualification	Singles match	11:44
8	Big Bubba Rogers defeated Sting	Singles match	13:43
9	The Nasty Boys (Brian Knobbs and Jerry Sags) defeated Harlem Heat (Booker T and Stevie Ray) (with Sister Sherri)	Falls Count Anywhere match	08:43
10	Hulk Hogan (with The Renegade) defeated Vader (with Ric Flair)	Leather Strap match	18:21
ME / – the match was broadcast prior to the pay-per-view on Main Event
