= List of WCW World Tag Team Champions =

Listing of professional wrestling champions for the WCW World Tag Team Championship

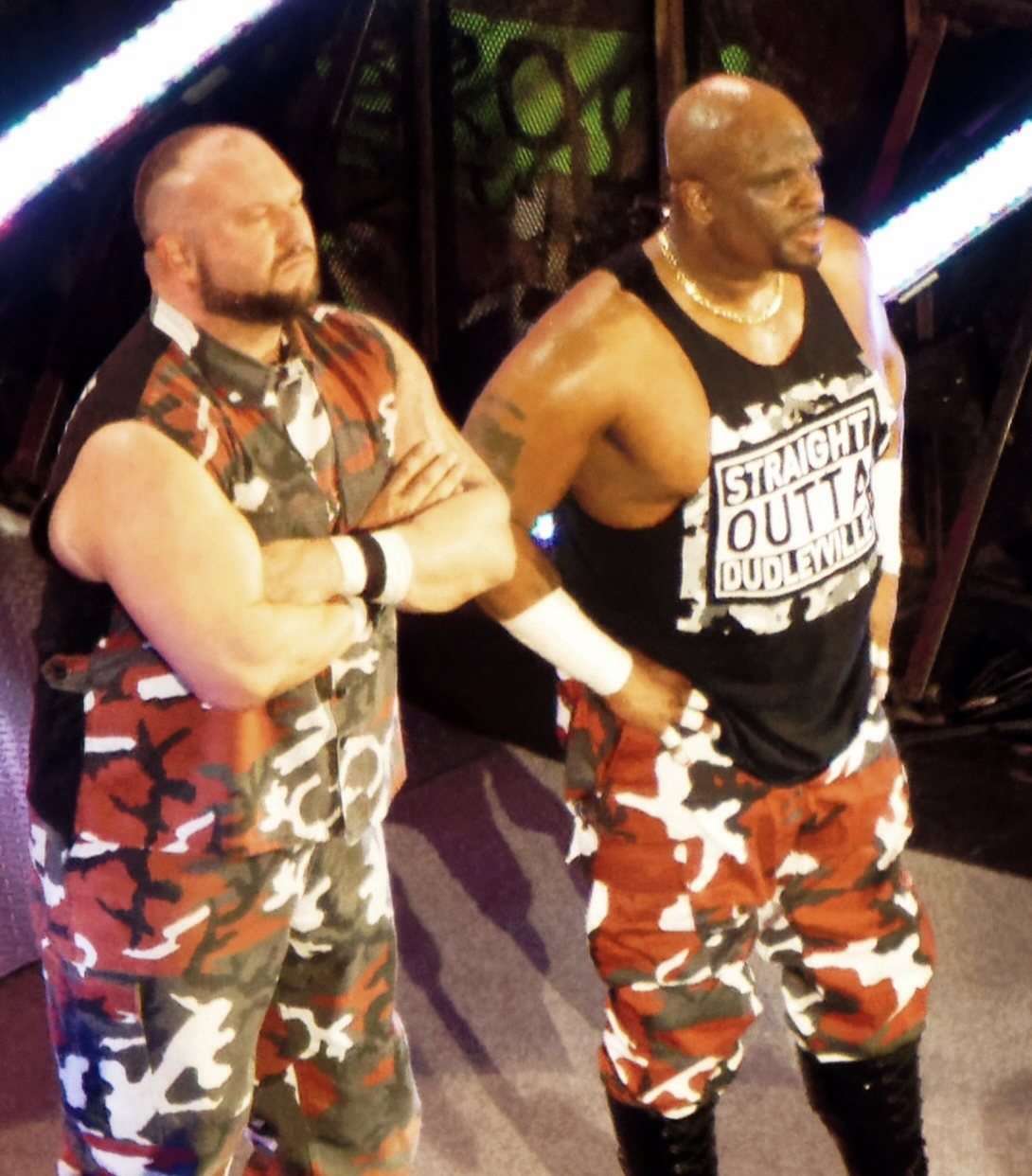
The Dudley Boyz were the final WCW World Tag Team Champions.

The WCW World Tag Team Championship was a professional wrestling World Tag Team Championship contested for in World Championship Wrestling (WCW). Originally, WCW was a member of the National Wrestling Alliance (NWA), which had numerous member promotions. The NWA operated many tag team championships before one prime tag team title was established in 1982. One of those titles was the NWA World Tag Team Championship, which was operated by the NWA member Mid-Atlantic Championship Wrestling (MACW), the predecessor of WCW. The championship was created by MACW in 1975.

In January 1991, WCW (the former MACW after merging with Championship Wrestling from Georgia in 1985) began the process of withdrawing as a member of the NWA to become an independent promotion, thus the name of the title was changed to the WCW World Tag Team Championship. On July 12, 1992, the WCW World Tag Team Championship was unified with the NWA World Tag Team Championship, which was created earlier that year by the NWA as its prime tag team championship. In September 1993, WCW's withdrawal from the NWA was made official, and the NWA World Tag Team Championship was returned to the NWA; the title was reactivated by the NWA in 1995.

In March 2001, all WCW assets were purchased by the then World Wrestling Federation (WWF) after AOL/Time Warner discontinued their involvement in wrestling programming. After the purchase, the WWF continued the use of the championship as a part of a storyline called The Invasion, which involved a rivalry between former WCW wrestlers and original WWF wrestlers before the purchase of WCW.

Title reigns were determined either by professional wrestling matches with different tag teams, a duo of wrestlers, involved in pre-existing scripted feuds, plots and storylines or were awarded the title due to scripted circumstances. Wrestlers were portrayed as either villains or fan favorites as they followed a series of tension-building events, which culminated in a wrestling match or series of matches for the championship. The inaugural champions, under the NWA, were The Minnesota Wrecking Crew (Gene Anderson and Ole Anderson), who were announced to have won the titles after winning a tournament in January 1975.

Before the promotion's purchase, the final champions recognized by WCW were Sean O' Haire and Chuck Palumbo; they were also the first champions under the titles operation in the WWF. On November 18, 2001, the championship was deactivated after its use in the Invasion storyline. The title was unified with the WWF Tag Team Championship, and the final champions recognized by the WWF, were The Dudley Boyz (Bubba Ray Dudley and D-Von Dudley). The title was won in Australia, Canada, Germany, and the United States. Harlem Heat (Booker T and Stevie Ray) held the most reigns as a tag team (10), and Booker T held the most individual reigns (11), which is the same number of times the title was vacated. At 282 days, Doom's reign during WCW's NWA withdrawal was the longest in the championship's history. Overall, there were 143 title reigns.

== Title history ==
=== Names ===
Name	Years
NWA World Tag Team Championship	January 29, 1975 – January 1991
WCW World Tag Team Championship	January 1991 – March 26, 2001
WCW Tag Team Championship	June 24, 2001 – November 18, 2001
Undisputed/Unified WWF Tag Team Championship	November 18, 2001

=== Reigns ===
Key
No.	Overall reign number
Reign	Reign number for the specific team—reign numbers for the individuals are in parentheses, if different
Days	Number of days held

No.	Champion	Championship change			Reign statistics		Notes	Ref.
No.	Champion	Date	Event	Location	Reign	Days	Notes	Ref.
National Wrestling Alliance (NWA)
1	Minnesota Wrecking Crew (Gene and Ole Anderson)	January 29, 1975	N/A	Raleigh, North Carolina	1	106	On a TV taping in Raleigh, the Andersons were said to be headed to San Francisco to participate in a tournament to crown new NWA World Tag Team Champions. The Andersons appeared with the belts on television the next week.	
2	Paul Jones and Wahoo McDaniel	May 15, 1975	House show	Greensboro, North Carolina	1	27		
3	Minnesota Wrecking Crew (Gene and Ole Anderson)	June 11, 1975	TV Taping at WRAL-TV	Raleigh, North Carolina	2	230		
4	Rufus R. Jones and Wahoo McDaniel (2)	January 27, 1976	House show	Columbia, South Carolina	1	7		
5	Minnesota Wrecking Crew (Gene and Ole Anderson)	February 3, 1976	House show	Raleigh, North Carolina	3	92		
6	Dino Bravo and Mr. Wrestling	May 5, 1976	TV Taping At WRAL-TV	Raleigh, North Carolina	1	54		
7	Minnesota Wrecking Crew (Gene and Ole Anderson)	June 28, 1976	House show	Greenville, South Carolina	4	181		
8	Ric Flair and Greg Valentine	December 26, 1976	House show	Greensboro, North Carolina	1	133		
9	Minnesota Wrecking Crew (Gene and Ole Anderson)	May 8, 1977	House show	Charlotte, North Carolina	5	138		
10	Dusty Rhodes and Dick Slater	September 23, 1977	House show	Atlanta, Georgia	1	21		
11	Minnesota Wrecking Crew (Gene and Ole Anderson)	October 14, 1977	House show	Atlanta, Georgia	6	16		
12	Ric Flair and Greg Valentine	October 30, 1977	House show	Greensboro, North Carolina	2	131		
—	Vacated	March 10, 1978	—	—	—	—	Flair and Valentine were forced to vacate their championship by the NWA for continually ending their matches via disqualification.	
13	Paul Jones (2) and Ricky Steamboat	April 23, 1978	House show	Greensboro, North Carolina	1	45	Defeated Masked Superstar and Ken Patera in a tournament final.	
14	Baron Von Raschke and Greg Valentine (3)	June 7, 1978	House show	Raleigh, North Carolina	1	202		
15	Paul Orndorff and Jimmy Snuka	December 26, 1978	House show	Richmond, Virginia	1	123		
16	Paul Jones (3) and Baron Von Raschke (2)	April 29, 1979	House show	Wilmington, North Carolina	1	101		
17	Ric Flair (3) and Blackjack Mulligan	August 8, 1979	House show	Raleigh, North Carolina	1	14		
18	Paul Jones (4) and Baron Von Raschke (3)	August 22, 1979	House show	Raleigh, North Carolina	2	63		
19	Ricky Steamboat (2) and Jay Youngblood	October 24, 1979	House show	Raleigh, North Carolina	1	157		
20	Ray Stevens and Greg Valentine (4)	March 29, 1980	House show	Charlotte, North Carolina	1	42		
21	Ricky Steamboat (3) and Jay Youngblood	May 10, 1980	House show	Greensboro, North Carolina	2	43		
22	Ray Stevens (2) and Jimmy Snuka (2)	June 22, 1980	House show	Greensboro, North Carolina	1	158		
23	Paul Jones (5) and The Masked Superstar	November 27, 1980	House show	Greensboro, North Carolina	1	87		
24	Ivan Koloff and Ray Stevens (3)	February 22, 1981	House show	Greensboro, North Carolina	1	28		
25	Paul Jones (6) and The Masked Superstar (2)	March 22, 1981	House show	Greensboro, North Carolina	2	40		
26	Minnesota Wrecking Crew (Gene and Ole Anderson)	May 1, 1981	House show	Richmond, Virginia	7	267		
—	Vacated	January 23, 1982	—	—	—	—	Gene was legitimately injured, and as a result, the NWA forced The Minnesota Wrecking Crew to relinquish the titles. Jim Crockett Promotions announced that a tournament to crown new champions would take place.	
27	Ole Anderson (8) and Stan Hansen	June 26, 1982	House show	Atlanta, Georgia	1	57	(Kayfabe) Awarded to Ole Anderson & Stan Hansen by the NWA after finalists Wahoo McDaniel & Magnificent Don Muraco split. In reality, Ole was fired as Jim Crockett Promotions booker and he took the championship belts to Georgia Championship Wrestling.	
—	Vacated	August 22, 1982	—	—	—	—	The NWA forced Anderson and Hansen to relinquish the championships. Ole Anderson returns the belts to Jim Crockett Promotions at a house show in Charlotte, North Carolina on August 22, 1982.	
28	Don Kernodle and Sgt. Slaughter	September 12, 1982	House show	N/A	1	181	Kernodle and Slaughter won the titles in a fictional tournament final. The promotion claimed that they had beaten Antonio Inoki and Giant Baba in Tokyo, Japan. Becomes undisputed championship on December 26, 1982, when Los Angeles version is abandoned.	
29	Ricky Steamboat (4) and Jay Youngblood	March 12, 1983	House show	Greensboro, North Carolina	3	98	Event was known as "The Final Conflict". The match had a stipulation that if Steamboat and Youngblood were to lose, they would never be a tag team again.	
30	Jack Brisco and Jerry Brisco	June 18, 1983	House show	Greenville, South Carolina	1	107		
31	Ricky Steamboat (5) and Jay Youngblood	October 3, 1983	House show	Greenville, South Carolina	4	18		
32	Jack Brisco and Jerry Brisco	October 21, 1983	House show	Richmond, Virginia	2	34		
33	Ricky Steamboat (6) and Jay Youngblood	November 24, 1983	Starrcade	Greensboro, North Carolina	5	31		
—	Vacated	December 25, 1983	—	—	—	—	The NWA vacated the title after Steamboat announced his retirement from professional wrestling.	
34	Don Kernodle (2) and Bob Orton Jr.	January 8, 1984	House show	Charlotte, North Carolina	1	56	Defeated Jimmy Valiant and Dory Funk Jr. in a tournament final.	
35	Wahoo McDaniel (3) and Mark Youngblood	March 4, 1984	House show	Charlotte, North Carolina	1	31		
36	Jack Brisco and Jerry Brisco	April 4, 1984	House show	Spartanburg, South Carolina	3	31		
37	Wahoo McDaniel (4) and Mark Youngblood	May 5, 1984	House show	Greensboro, North Carolina	2	3		
38	Don Kernodle (3) and Ivan Koloff (2)	May 8, 1984	House show	Raleigh, North Carolina	1	165		
39	Manny Fernandez and Dusty Rhodes (2)	October 20, 1984	House show	Raleigh, North Carolina	1	149	This was a steel cage match. Ivan Koloff and Nikita Koloff turned on Don Kernodle after the match, seriously (kayfabe) injuring him.	
40	Russian Team (Ivan Koloff (3), Nikita Koloff and Krusher Krushchev)	March 18, 1985	House show	Fayetteville, North Carolina	1	113	During this title reign, Krusher Krushchev joined the Koloffs to form a three-man team, in which the NWA applied the Freebird Rule, allowing all three members to defend the title.	
41	Rock 'n' Roll Express (Robert Gibson and Ricky Morton)	July 9, 1985	House show	Shelby, North Carolina	1	96	Defeated Ivan Koloff and Krusher Khrushchev.	
42	Russian Team (Ivan Koloff (4) and Nikita Koloff)	October 13, 1985	House show	Charlotte, North Carolina	2	46		
43	Rock 'n' Roll Express (Robert Gibson and Ricky Morton)	November 28, 1985	Starrcade	Greensboro, North Carolina	2	66		
44	The Midnight Express (Dennis Condrey and Bobby Eaton)	February 2, 1986	Superstars on the Superstation	Atlanta, Georgia	1	195		
45	Rock 'n' Roll Express (Robert Gibson and Ricky Morton)	August 16, 1986	House show	Philadelphia, Pennsylvania	3	112		
46	Manny Fernandez (2) and Rick Rude	December 6, 1986	World Championship Wrestling	Atlanta, Georgia	1	171	This title change aired on tape delay that evening.	
47	Rock 'n' Roll Express (Robert Gibson and Ricky Morton)	May 26, 1987	N/A	Spokane, Washington	4	126	Awarded in a phantom match in Spokane, Washington, said to have defeated Fernandez and Ivan Koloff (substituting for Rude after he left for the WWF). An earlier match against Fernandez and Rude was also shown.	
48	Arn Anderson and Tully Blanchard	September 29, 1987	Pro Wrestling	Misenheimer, North Carolina	1	180	Match was no disqualification. The Midnight Express attacked The Rock 'n' Roll Express en route to the ring, injuring Ricky Morton. Robert Gibson wrestled most of the match solo, but when an injured Morton returned to the ring, he was immediately put into a submission hold by Blanchard. Gibson surrendered rather than risk further injury to Morton. This title change aired on tape delay.	
49	Lex Luger and Barry Windham	March 27, 1988	Clash of the Champions I	Greensboro, North Carolina	1	24		
50	Arn Anderson and Tully Blanchard	April 20, 1988	World Championship Wrestling	Jacksonville, Florida	2	143	Windham turned on Luger and joined the Four Horsemen. This title change aired on tape delay.	
51	The Midnight Express (Bobby Eaton (2) and Stan Lane)	September 10, 1988	House show	Philadelphia, Pennsylvania	1	49	Anderson and Blanchard left for the WWF after this match.	
52	Road Warriors (Animal and Hawk)	October 29, 1988	World Wide Wrestling	New Orleans, Louisiana	1	155		
53	Varsity Club (Mike Rotunda and Steve Williams)	April 2, 1989	Clash of the Champions VI: Ragin' Cajun	New Orleans, Louisiana	1	35	Referee Teddy Long fast-counted Road Warrior Hawk's shoulders on the mat, beginning Long's eventual heel turn that would see him fired as a referee and become a manager.	
—	Vacated	May 7, 1989	WrestleWar	Nashville, Tennessee	—	—	The NWA forced Rotunda and Williams to relinquish the titles due to The Varsity Club members Kevin Sullivan and Dan Spivey attacking special referee Nikita Koloff during the WrestleWar '89 title defense against The Road Warriors.	
54	The Fabulous Freebirds (Jimmy Garvin and Michael Hayes)	June 14, 1989	Clash of the Champions VII: Guts and Glory	Fort Bragg, North Carolina	1	140	Defeated The Midnight Express in a tournament final.	
55	The Steiner Brothers (Rick Steiner and Scott Steiner)	November 1, 1989	World Championship Wrestling	Atlanta, Georgia	1	199	This title change aired on tape delay on November 18, 1989.	
National Wrestling Alliance (NWA)/World Championship Wrestling (WCW)
56	Doom (Butch Reed and Ron Simmons)	May 19, 1990	Capital Combat	Washington, D.C.	1	281	Title renamed the WCW World Tag Team Championship during this reign following WCW breaking ties with the NWA.	
57	The Fabulous Freebirds (Michael Hayes and Jimmy Garvin)	February 24, 1991	WrestleWar	Phoenix, Arizona	2	−6	Lost the titles at a television taping 7 days before winning them.	
58	The Steiner Brothers (Rick Steiner and Scott Steiner)	February 18, 1991	Pro Wrestling	Montgomery, Alabama	2	152	This title change aired on tape delay on March 9, 1991.	
—	Vacated	July 20, 1991	World Championship Wrestling	—	—	—	Stripped of titles after Scott sustained a legitimate biceps injury.	
59	Enforcers (Arn Anderson (3) and Larry Zbyszko)	September 5, 1991	Clash of the Champions XVI: Fall Brawl	Augusta, Georgia	1	75	Defeated Rick Steiner and Bill Kazmaier in a tournament final.	
60	Ricky Steamboat (7) and Dustin Rhodes	November 19, 1991	Clash of the Champions XVII	Savannah, Georgia	1	58		
61	Arn Anderson (4) and Bobby Eaton (3)	January 16, 1992	House show	Jacksonville, Florida	1	108		
62	The Steiner Brothers (Rick Steiner and Scott Steiner)	May 3, 1992	House show	Chicago, Illinois	3	63		
63	Miracle Violence Connection (Steve Williams (2) and Terry Gordy)	July 5, 1992	House show	Atlanta, Georgia	1	78	On July 12, 1992, Gordy and Williams won the NWA World Tag Team Championship, which was regarded as unified with the WCW World Tag Team Championship; from here until the withdrawal of WCW from the NWA, the two titles are defended together.	
64	Barry Windham (2) and Dustin Rhodes (2)	September 21, 1992	Saturday Night	Atlanta, Georgia	1	58	This title change aired on tape delay on October 3, 1992.	
65	Ricky Steamboat (8) and Shane Douglas	November 18, 1992	Clash of the Champions XXI	Macon, Georgia	1	104		
66	The Hollywood Blonds (Steve Austin and Brian Pillman)	March 2, 1993	WorldWide	Macon, Georgia	1	169	This title change aired on tape delay on March 27, 1993.	
67	Arn Anderson (5) and Paul Roma	August 18, 1993	Clash of the Champions XXIV	Daytona Beach, Florida	1	32	Anderson and Roma are stripped of the NWA World Tag Team Championship on September 1, 1993 following WCW's withdrawal from the NWA. WCW and NWA Tag Team Championships are hereafter no longer defended together.	
World Championship Wrestling (WCW)
68	The Nasty Boys (Jerry Sags and Brian Knobbs)	September 19, 1993	Fall Brawl	Houston, Texas	1	15		
69	Marcus Alexander Bagwell and 2 Cold Scorpio	October 4, 1993	Saturday Night	Columbus, Georgia	1	20	This title change aired on tape delay on October 23, 1993.	
70	The Nasty Boys (Jerry Sags and Brian Knobbs)	October 24, 1993	Halloween Havoc	New Orleans, Louisiana	2	210		
71	Cactus Jack and Kevin Sullivan	May 22, 1994	Slamboree	Philadelphia, Pennsylvania	1	56	This was a Broad Street Bully match. Dave Schultz was the special guest referee.	
72	Pretty Wonderful (Paul Roma (2) and Paul Orndorff (2))	July 17, 1994	Bash at the Beach	Orlando, Florida	1	70		
73	Stars and Stripes (Marcus Alexander Bagwell (2) and The Patriot)	September 25, 1994	Main Event	Atlanta, Georgia	1	28		
74	Pretty Wonderful (Paul Roma (3) and Paul Orndorff (3))	October 23, 1994	Halloween Havoc	Detroit, Michigan	2	24		
75	Stars and Stripes (Marcus Alexander Bagwell (3) and The Patriot (2))	November 16, 1994	Clash of the Champions XXIX	Jacksonville, Florida	2	22		
76	Harlem Heat (Booker T and Stevie Ray)	December 8, 1994	Saturday Night	Atlanta, Georgia	1	164	This title change aired on tape delay on January 14, 1995.	
77	The Nasty Boys (Jerry Sags and Brian Knobbs)	May 21, 1995	Slamboree	St. Petersburg, Florida	3	−18	See next reign for explanation.	
78	Harlem Heat (Booker T and Stevie Ray)	May 3, 1995	WorldWide	Orlando, Florida	2	28	This title change aired on tape delay on June 24, 1995. When the episode of WorldWide featuring this match was shot on May 3, Harlem Heat were still the champions as Slamboree did not occur until eighteen days later. While the reign of The Nasty Boys technically ended before it began due to the taping schedule, the team's official reign length is 33 days.	
79	Dick Slater (2) and Bunkhouse Buck	June 21, 1995	Saturday Night	Atlanta, Georgia	1	57	This title change aired on tape delay on July 22, 1995. Like the two previous reigns, the tapings were done far enough in advance for the champions not to have won the titles; when the match was taped, The Nasty Boys were still the champions and Harlem Heat's regaining of the titles on WorldWide had not yet aired.	
80	Harlem Heat (Booker T and Stevie Ray)	September 17, 1995	Fall Brawl	Asheville, North Carolina	3	1		
81	American Males (Marcus Alexander Bagwell (4) and Scotty Riggs)	September 18, 1995	Nitro	Johnson City, Tennessee	1	9		
82	Harlem Heat (Booker T and Stevie Ray)	September 27, 1995	Saturday Night	Atlanta, Georgia	4	117	This title change aired on tape delay on October 28, 1995.	
83	Sting and Lex Luger (2)	January 22, 1996	Nitro	Las Vegas, Nevada	1	154		
84	Harlem Heat (Booker T and Stevie Ray)	June 24, 1996	Nitro	Charlotte, North Carolina	5	30		
85	The Steiner Brothers (Rick Steiner and Scott Steiner)	July 24, 1996	House show	Cincinnati, Ohio	4	3		
86	Harlem Heat (Booker T and Stevie Ray)	July 27, 1996	House show	Dayton, Ohio	6	58		
87	The Public Enemy (Johnny Grunge and Rocco Rock)	September 23, 1996	Nitro	Birmingham, Alabama	1	8		
88	Harlem Heat (Booker T and Stevie Ray)	October 1, 1996	Saturday Night	Canton, Ohio	7	26	This title change aired on tape delay on October 5, 1996.	
89	The Outsiders (Kevin Nash and Scott Hall)	October 27, 1996	Halloween Havoc	Las Vegas, Nevada	1	90		
90	The Steiner Brothers (Rick Steiner and Scott Steiner)	January 25, 1997	Souled Out	Cedar Rapids, Iowa	5	2		
91	The Outsiders (Kevin Nash and Scott Hall)	January 27, 1997	Nitro	Las Vegas, Nevada	2	27	WCW President Eric Bischoff stripped The Steiner Brothers of the titles and returned them to The Outsiders due to WCW referee Randy Anderson, who was not an official referee for Souled Out, counting the fall.	
92	Lex Luger and The Giant	February 23, 1997	SuperBrawl VII	Daly City, California	1	1		
93	The Outsiders (Kevin Nash, Scott Hall and Syxx (1))	February 24, 1997	Nitro	Sacramento, California	3	231	WCW President Eric Bischoff returned the titles to The Outsiders as Luger was not medically cleared to wrestle at SuperBrawl, though Luger and The Giant only agreed to give back the belts if the nWo put all their titles on the line at Uncensored; Syxx also gets credited with a reign as the nWo invoked "Wolfpac Rules" and named Syxx as champion after an injury to Nash on October 13, 1997.	
94	The Steiner Brothers (Rick Steiner and Scott Steiner)	October 13, 1997	Nitro	Tampa, Florida	6	91	Defeated Scott Hall and Syxx for the titles.	
95	The Outsiders (Kevin Nash and Scott Hall)	January 12, 1998	Nitro	Jacksonville, Florida	4	28		
96	The Steiner Brothers (Rick Steiner and Scott Steiner)	February 9, 1998	Nitro	El Paso, Texas	7	13		
97	The Outsiders (Kevin Nash and Scott Hall)	February 22, 1998	SuperBrawl VIII	Daly City, California	5	84	The Outsiders win the titles after Scott turned on Rick and joined the nWo.	
98	Sting (2) and The Giant (2)	May 17, 1998	Slamboree	Worcester, Massachusetts	1	16	Sting and Giant won the titles after Hall turned on Nash and hit him with one of the title belts.	
—	Vacated	June 2, 1998	Thunder	Peoria, Illinois	—	—	WCW vacated the titles after Sting joined the nWo Wolfpac.	
99	Sting (3) and Kevin Nash (6)	June 14, 1998	The Great American Bash	Baltimore, Maryland	1	36	Sting won the championships in a singles match against The Giant, in which the winner would take control of the Tag Team Championship and choose a partner to defend with; on the following night's Nitro broadcast in Uniondale, NY, Sting chose Nash.	
100	Scott Hall (6) and The Giant (3)	July 20, 1998	Nitro	Salt Lake City, Utah	1	97		
101	Rick Steiner (8) and Kenny Kaos/Judy Bagwell	October 25, 1998	Halloween Havoc	Las Vegas, Nevada	1	74 (15/59)	Rick Steiner and Buff Bagwell defeated The Giant and Scott Steiner, who subbed for an injured Scott Hall. Since Bagwell turned on Steiner during the match, Steiner was allowed to pick a new championship partner, and chose Kaos the next night on Nitro. After Kaos was injured, Steiner then chose Bagwell's mother, Judy, as his new championship partner on November 9, 1998 as a psychological ploy against Buff Bagwell.	
—	Vacated	January 7, 1999	Thunder	Richmond, Virginia	—	—	WCW vacated the championship after Rick Steiner sustained a legitimate injury.	
102	Barry Windham (3) and Curt Hennig	February 21, 1999	SuperBrawl IX	Oakland, California	1	21	Defeated Chris Benoit and Dean Malenko in the finals of a double-elimination tournament.	
103	Chris Benoit and Dean Malenko	March 14, 1999	Uncensored	Louisville, Kentucky	1	15	This was a Lumberjack match.	
104	Rey Misterio Jr. and Billy Kidman	March 29, 1999	Nitro	Toronto, Ontario, Canada	1	41		
105	Raven and Perry Saturn	May 9, 1999	Slamboree	St. Louis, Missouri	1	22	Title won in a tag-team triangle match also involving the team of Chris Benoit and Dean Malenko.	
106	Diamond Dallas Page and Bam Bam Bigelow	May 31, 1999	Nitro	Houston, Texas	1	7	Defeated Saturn and Chris Kanyon (serving as an injury substitute for Raven).	
107	Chris Benoit (2) and Perry Saturn (2)	June 7, 1999	Nitro	Cleveland, Ohio	1	6		
108	Jersey Triad (Diamond Dallas Page (2), Bam Bam Bigelow (2), and Chris Kanyon)	June 13, 1999	The Great American Bash	Baltimore, Maryland	1	62	Page and Kanyon won the title, with Bigelow also defending via the "Freebird Rule".	
109	Harlem Heat (Booker T and Stevie Ray)	August 14, 1999	Road Wild	Sturgis, South Dakota	8	9	Defeated Bigelow and Kanyon for the title.	
110	The West Texas Rednecks (Barry Windham (4) and Kendall Windham)	August 23, 1999	Nitro	Las Vegas, Nevada	1	20		
111	Harlem Heat (Booker T and Stevie Ray)	September 12, 1999	Fall Brawl	Winston-Salem, North Carolina	9	36		
112	The Filthy Animals (Konnan and Rey Misterio Jr. (2))	October 18, 1999	Nitro	Philadelphia, Pennsylvania	1	6		
—	Vacated	October 24, 1999	Halloween Havoc	Las Vegas, Nevada	—	—	WCW vacated the titles after Misterio Jr. sustained a legitimate leg injury.	
113	Harlem Heat (Booker T and Stevie Ray)	October 24, 1999	Halloween Havoc	Las Vegas, Nevada	10	1	Titles won in a Triple Threat Street Fight against Konnan & Billy Kidman and Brian Knobbs & Hugh Morrus.	
114	The Filthy Animals (Konnan (2) and Billy Kidman (2))	October 25, 1999	Nitro	Phoenix, Arizona	1	28		
115	Creative Control (Gerald and Patrick)	November 22, 1999	Nitro	Auburn Hills, Michigan	1	15		
116	Bret Hart and Goldberg	December 7, 1999	Thunder	Madison, Wisconsin	1	6	Both men achieved the Triple Crown at the same time with this win.	
117	The Outsiders (Kevin Nash (7) and Scott Hall (7))	December 13, 1999	Nitro	New Orleans, Louisiana	6	14		
—	Vacated	December 27, 1999	Nitro	Houston, Texas	—	—	WCW vacated the titles after Hall sustained a legitimate injury.	
118	David Flair and Crowbar	January 3, 2000	Nitro	Greenville, South Carolina	1	15	Defeated Kevin Nash and Scott Steiner in a tournament final.	
119	The Mamalukes (Johnny the Bull and Big Vito)	January 18, 2000	Thunder	Evansville, Indiana	1	25		
120	Harris Brothers (Ron Harris and Don Harris)	February 12, 2000	House show	Oberhausen, Germany	2	1	Previous held the championship under the name "Creative Control".	
121	The Mamalukes (Johnny the Bull and Big Vito)	February 13, 2000	House show	Leipzig, Germany	2	35		
122	The Harris Brothers (Ron and Don Harris)	March 19, 2000	Uncensored	Miami, Florida	3	22		
—	Vacated	April 10, 2000	Nitro	Denver, Colorado	—	—	WCW Presidents Vince Russo and Eric Bischoff vacated every WCW championship during WCW's reboot.	
123	Shane Douglas (2) and Buff Bagwell (5)	April 16, 2000	Spring Stampede	Chicago, Illinois	1	29	Defeated The Total Package and Ric Flair in a tournament final.	
124	KroniK (Brian Adams and Bryan Clark)	May 15, 2000	Nitro	Biloxi, Mississippi	1	15		
125	The Perfect Event (Shawn Stasiak and Chuck Palumbo)	May 30, 2000	Thunder	Nampa, Idaho	1	40	This title change aired on tape delay.	
126	KroniK (Brian Adams and Bryan Clark)	July 9, 2000	Bash at the Beach	Daytona Beach, Florida	2	35		
127	Dark Carnival (The Great Muta and Vampiro)	August 13, 2000	New Blood Rising	Vancouver, British Columbia	1	1		
128	The Filthy Animals (Rey Misterio Jr. (3) and Juventud Guerrera)	August 14, 2000	Nitro	Kelowna, British Columbia	1	35		
—	Vacated	September 18, 2000	—	—	—	—	Misterio and Guerrera were stripped of the titles due to their stablemate, Disqo losing a match against the WCW Commissioner Ernest Miller in which if Disqo won, he would become Commissioner for a day.	
129	Sean O'Haire and Mark Jindrak	September 25, 2000	Nitro	Uniondale, New York	1	14	O'Haire and Jindrak won a tag team battle royal in which both members of the team must be eliminated, they last eliminated Rey Misterio Jr. representing The Filthy Animals; the other participants were Misterio's partner Juventud Guerrera, The Harris Brothers (Ron and Don Harris), 3 Count (Shane Helms and Shannon Moore), The Jung Dragons (Jamie-San and Kaz Hayashi), Misfits in Action (Cpl. Cajun and Lt. Loco)	
130	The Misfits in Action (Lieutenant Loco and Corporal Cajun)	October 9, 2000	Thunder	Sydney, Australia	1	0		
131	Sean O'Haire and Mark Jindrak	October 9, 2000	Thunder	Sydney, Australia	2	38		
132	Boogie Knights (Alex Wright and Disco Inferno)	November 16, 2000	Millennium Final	Oberhausen, Germany	1	4	Wright teamed up with General Rection, who took the place of an injured Disco Inferno. However, Inferno is recognized by WWE as the champion with Wright.	
133	The Perfect Event (Shawn Stasiak and Chuck Palumbo)	November 20, 2000	Nitro	Augusta, Georgia	2	6	Defeated Alex Wright and Elix Skipper, who took the place of an injured Disco Inferno.	
134	The Insiders (Diamond Dallas Page (3) and Kevin Nash (8))	November 26, 2000	Mayhem	Milwaukee, Wisconsin	1	8		
135	The Perfect Event (Shawn Stasiak and Chuck Palumbo)	December 4, 2000	Nitro	Lincoln, Nebraska	3	13	WCW Commissioner Mike Sanders awarded Stasiak and Palumbo the titles after The Insiders were forced to vacate the titles.	
136	The Insiders (Diamond Dallas Page (4) and Kevin Nash (9))	December 17, 2000	Starrcade	Washington, D.C.	2	28		
137	Natural Born Thrillers (Chuck Palumbo (4) and Sean O'Haire (3))	January 14, 2001	Sin	Indianapolis, Indiana	1	205	This title reign by Palumbo and O'Haire was the final recognized by WCW before its assets were bought by the WWF; titles renamed to WCW Tag Team Championship.	
World Wrestling Federation (WWF)
138	Brothers of Destruction (Kane and The Undertaker)	August 7, 2001	SmackDown!	Los Angeles, California	1	49	This title change aired on tape delay. Kane and The Undertaker later won the WWF Tag Team Championship from Diamond Dallas Page and Kanyon on August 19, 2001 at SummerSlam in a steel cage match where the WCW Tag Team Championship was also on the line. Both titles were independently active during this reign.	
139	Booker T (11) and Test	September 25, 2001	SmackDown!	Dayton, Ohio	1	13	This title change aired on tape delay.	
140	The Hardy Boyz (Jeff Hardy and Matt Hardy)	October 8, 2001	Raw	Indianapolis, Indiana	1	15		
141	Dudley Boyz (Bubba Ray Dudley and D-Von Dudley)	October 23, 2001	SmackDown!	Omaha, Nebraska	1	26		
—	Unified	November 18, 2001	Survivor Series	Greensboro, North Carolina	—	—	Unified with the WWF Tag Team Championship when The Dudley Boyz beat The Hardy Boyz.	

== Combined reigns ==
¤	The exact length of one title reign is uncertain, so the shortest possible length is used.

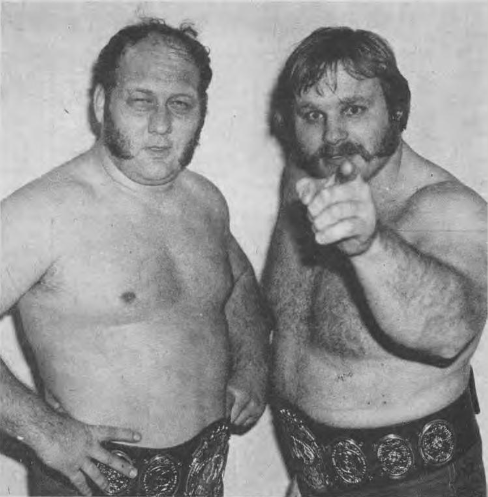
Inaugural, 7-time and record-setting most combined days at 992 days The Minnesota Wrecking Crew (Gene and Ole Anderson)

=== By team ===
Rank	Team	No. of reigns	Combined days
1.	Minnesota Wrecking Crew	7	992¤
2.	The Steiner Brothers	7	523
3.	Harlem Heat	10	470
4.	Rock 'n' Roll Express	4	400
5.	Ricky Steamboat and Jay Youngblood	5	347
6.	Arn Anderson and Tully Blanchard	2	323
7.	Ric Flair and Greg Valentine	2	286¤
8.	Doom	1	282
9.	The Nasty Boys	3	259
10.	The Outsiders	5	244
11.	The Outsiders with Syxx	1	231
12.	Sean O'Haire and Chuck Palumbo	1	205
13.	The Midnight Express (Dennis Condrey and Bobby Eaton)	1	195
14.	Sgt. Slaughter and Don Kernodle	1	193¤
15.	Ole Anderson and Stan Hansen	1	185¤
16.	Baron von Raschke and Greg Valentine	1	177¤
17.	Jack Brisco and Jerry Brisco	3	172
18.	The Hollywood Blonds	1	169
19.	Ivan Koloff and Don Kernodle	1	165
19.	Baron von Raschke and Paul Jones	2	165
21.	Jimmy Snuka and Ray Stevens	1	158
22.	Road Warriors	1	155
23.	Sting and Lex Luger	1	154
24.	Dusty Rhodes and Manny Fernandez	1	150
24.	Manny Fernandez and Rick Rude	1	150
26.	Jimmy Snuka and Paul Orndorff	1	148¤
27.	The Fabulous Freebirds	2	134
28.	Paul Jones and Masked Superstar	2	127
29.	Ivan Koloff and Nikita Koloff (with Krusher Khrushchev)	1	113
30.	Arn Anderson and Bobby Eaton	1	108
31.	Shane Douglas and Ricky Steamboat	1	104
32.	The Giant and Scott Hall	1	98
33.	Pretty Wonderful	2	94
34.	Miracle Violence Connection	1	78
35.	Enforcers	1	75
36.	Kenny Kaos and Rick Steiner	1	74
36.	The Mamalukes	2	70
38.	Jersey Triad	1	62
39.	The Perfect Event	3	59
40.	Dustin Rhodes and Ricky Steamboat	1	58
40.	Dustin Rhodes and Barry Windham	1	58
42.	Bunkhouse Buck and Dick Slater	1	57
43.	Don Kernodle and Bob Orton Jr.	1	56
43.	Cactus Jack and Kevin Sullivan	1	56
45.	Mr. Wrestling and Dino Bravo	1	54
46.	Mark Jindrak and Sean O'Haire	2	52
47.	KroniK	2	50
47.	Stars and Stripes	2	50
49.	The Midnight Express (Bobby Eaton and Stan Lane)	1	49
49.	Brothers of Destruction	1	49
51.	Ivan Koloff and Nikita Koloff	1	46
52.	Paul Jones and Ricky Steamboat	1	45
53.	Ray Stevens and Greg Valentine	1	42
54.	Billy Kidman and Rey Misterio Jr.	1	41
55.	Creative Control/Harris Brothers	3	40
56.	The Insiders	2	36
57.	Varsity Club	1	35
57.	Kevin Nash and Sting	1	35
57.	The Filthy Animals (Juventud Guerrera and Rey Misterio Jr.)	1	35
60.	Wahoo McDaniel and Mark Youngblood	2	33
61.	Arn Anderson and Paul Roma	1	32
62.	Buff Bagwell and Shane Douglas	1	29
63.	Ray Stevens and Ivan Koloff	1	28
63.	The Filthy Animals (Billy Kidman and Konnan)	1	28
65.	Wahoo McDaniel and Paul Jones	1	27
66.	Dudley Boyz	1	26
67.	Lex Luger and Barry Windham	1	24
68.	Raven and Perry Saturn	1	22
69.	Curt Hennig and Barry Windham	1	21
70.	Marcus Bagwell and 2 Cold Scorpio	1	20
70.	The West Texas Rednecks (Barry Windham and Kendall Windham)	1	20
72.	The Giant and Sting	1	18
73.	Chris Benoit and Dean Malenko	1	15
73.	Crowbar and David Flair	1	15
73.	The Hardy Boyz	1	15
76.	Ric Flair and Blackjack Mulligan	1	14
77.	Booker T and Test	1	13
78.	American Males	1	9
79.	The Public Enemy	1	8
80.	Wahoo McDaniel and Rufus R. Jones	1	7
80.	Dusty Rhodes and Dick Slater	1	7
80.	Diamond Dallas Page and Bam Bam Bigelow	1	7
83.	The Filthy Animals (Konnan and Rey Misterio Jr.)	1	6
83.	Goldberg and Bret Hart	1	6
83.	Chris Benoit and Perry Saturn	1	6
86.	Boogie Knights	1	4
87.	Lex Luger and The Giant	1	1
87.	The Great Muta and Vampiro	1	1
89.	The Misfits in Action	1	<1

=== By wrestler ===
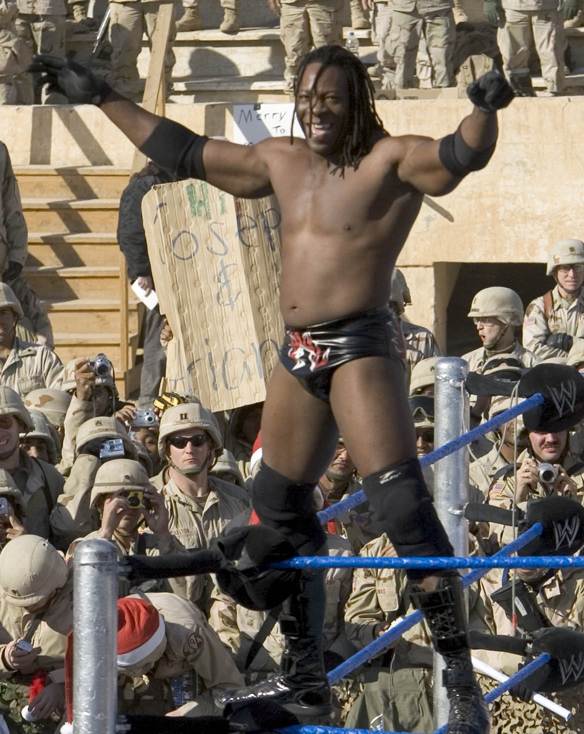
Booker T record eleven-time champion

Rank	Wrestler	No. of reigns	Combined days
1	Ole Anderson	8	1,162
2	Gene Anderson	7	977
3	Rick Steiner	8	597
4	Scott Hall	7	571
5	Ricky Steamboat	8	554
6	Kevin Nash	9	546
7	Arn Anderson	5	538
8	Greg Valentine	4	530
9	Scott Steiner	7	523
10	Booker T	11	483
11	Stevie Ray	10	470
12	Don Kernodle	3	413
13	Robert Gibson	4	400
13	Ricky Morton	4	400
15	Baron von Raschke	3	367
16	Paul Jones	6	364
17	Ivan Koloff	4	352
17	Bobby Eaton	3	352
19	Jay Youngblood	5	347
20	Tully Blanchard	2	323
21	Manny Fernandez	2	320
22	Ric Flair	3	300
23	Jimmy Snuka	2	281
23	Butch Reed	1	281
23	Ron Simmons	1	281
26	Chuck Palumbo	4	264
27	Sean O'Haire	3	257
28	Syxx	1	231
29	Ray Stevens	3	228
30	Paul Orndorff	3	217
31	Jerry Sags	3	207
31	Brian Knobs	3	207
32	Sting	3	206
34	Dennis Condrey	1	195
35	Sgt. Slaughter	1	192
36	Stan Hansen	1	185
37	Lex Luger	3	179
38	Jack Brisco	3	172
38	Jerry Brisco	3	172
40	Rick Rude	1	171
41	Dusty Rhodes	2	170
42	Steve Austin	1	169
42	Brian Pillman	1	169
44	Nikita Koloff	2	159
45	Animal	1	155
45	Hawk	1	155
47	Jimmy Garvin	2	134
47	Michael Hayes	2	134
49	Shane Douglas	2	133
50	The Masked Superstar	2	127
51	Paul Roma	3	126
52	Barry Windham	4	123
53	Dustin Rhodes	2	116
54	The Giant	3	114
55	Krusher Khrushchev	1	113
56	Marcus Alexander Bagwell/Marcus Bagwell/Buff Bagwell	5	107
57	Diamond Dallas Page	4	105
58	Steve Williams	2	94
59	Rey Mysterio Jr.	3	82
60	Dick Slater	2	78
61	Larry Zbyszko	1	75
62	Kenny Kaos	1	74
63	Billy Kidman	2	69
63	Bam Bam Bigelow	2	70
65	Wahoo McDaniel	4	68
66	Chris Kanyon	1	62
67	Johnny the Bull	2	60
67	Big Vito	2	60
69	Terry Gordy	1	78
69	Shawn Stasiak	3	59
71	Bunkhouse Buck	1	57
72	Bob Orton Jr.	1	56
72	Cactus Jack	1	56
72	Kevin Sullivan	1	56
75	Dino Bravo	1	54
75	Mr. Wrestling	1	54
77	Mark Jindrak	2	52
78	The Patriot	2	50
78	Brian Adams	2	50
78	Bryan Clark	2	50
81	Stan Lane	1	49
81	Kane	1	49
81	The Undertaker	1	49
84	Gerald/Ron Harris	3	38
84	Patrick/Don Harris	3	38
86	Mike Rotunda	1	35
86	Juventud Guerrera	1	35
88	Mark Youngblood	2	34
88	Konnan	2	34
90	Perry Saturn	2	28
91	Bubba Ray Dudley	1	26
91	D-Von Dudley	1	26
93	Raven	1	22
94	Chris Benoit	2	21
94	Curt Hennig	1	21
95	2 Cold Scorpio	1	20
95	Kendall Windham	1	20
98	Dean Malenko	1	15
98	David Flair	1	15
98	Crowbar	1	15
98	Jeff Hardy	1	15
98	Matt Hardy	1	15
103	Blackjack Mulligan	1	14
104	Test	1	13
105	Scotty Riggs	1	9
106	Johnny Grunge	1	8
106	Rocco Rock	1	8
108	Rufus R. Jones	1	7
109	Bret Hart	1	6
109	Goldberg	1	6
111	Alex Wright	1	4
111	Disco Inferno	1	4
113	The Great Muta	1	1
113	Vampiro	1	1
115	Lieutenant Loco	1	<1
115	Corporal Cajun	1	<1

== See also ==
- List of former championships in WWE
- Tag team championships in WWE

== Footnotes ==
- - This title reign is included twice for the purpose of showing the different recognitions by WCW and the WWF.
