= Pretty Wonderful =

Professional wrestling tag team

Tag team
- Members: Paul Orndorff; Paul Roma
- Billed heights: Orndorff: 5 ft 11 in (1.80 m); Roma: 5 ft 11 in (1.80 m)
- Combined billed weight: 499 lb (226 kg; 35.6 st)
- Debut: November 13, 1993
- Disbanded: March 7, 1995

Pretty Wonderful was a professional wrestling tag team composed of "Mr. Wonderful" Paul Orndorff and "Pretty" Paul Roma who competed in World Championship Wrestling (WCW) in 1993 and 1994

== History ==
=== The making of the team ===
In the leading up to Orndorff and Roma teaming together, Roma was a part of The Four Horsemen while Orndorff came off a stint as the WCW World Television Champion. Roma and Arn Anderson would hold the WCW World Tag Team Championship for a little over a month before losing the championship to The Nasty Boys (Brian Knobbs and Jerry Sags).

After the 1993 pay-per-view Battlebowl, the Horsemen Roma and Anderson faced the semi-regular team of Paul Orndorff and "Stunning" Steve Austin on Saturday Night. During the match, Roma acted very indifferent to his tag team partner. Next, Roma teamed with Erik Watts to take on the team of Orndorff and Lord Steven Regal, but this time Roma took it a step further and attacked Erik Watts before announcing that he was now teaming with Orndorff.

=== Pretty Wonderful ===
Under the tutelage of manager Masked Assassin, the team quickly began to work well together in a feud with Marcus Alexander Bagwell and 2 Cold Scorpio. After a few months as a team, they targeted the then WCW World Tag Team Champions, Cactus Jack and Kevin Sullivan. The champions had one last defense against former champions The Nasty Boys that also saw Kevin's injured brother Dave. The match degraded into a brawl that saw Pretty Wonderful interfere, using Dave's crutch to attack the champions. Before leaving the ring, they also took a couple of shots at The Nasty Boys for good measure.

Going into Bash at the Beach, Pretty Wonderful had the advantage as both champions were suffering from injuries inflicted by the challengers on previous occasions, which would lead Roma and Orndorff to win the championship. After successfully defending the championship against The Nasty Boys, Pretty Wonderful was challenged by the duo of Stars and Stripes (Marcus Alexander Bagwell and The Patriot) at Fall Brawl, where Pretty Wonderful retained the WCW World Tag Team Championship, only to lose it a week later to Stars and Stripes in a rematch. Pretty Wonderful was granted a rematch against the new champions with a match booked for Halloween Havoc, where Pretty Wonderful regained the championship when Roma used one of the title belts to knock Bagwell out cold. At Clash of the Champions XXIX, Stars and Stripes were granted one final shot at the WCW World Tag Team Championship, but the challengers also had to put up the Patriot's mask on the line, as if they lost he would unmask. After a controversial double pin, Stars and Stripes were declared the winners, and thus put an end to Pretty Wonderful's second and final run with the championship.

=== Aftermath ===
After their last title loss, Roma and Orndorff went their separate ways with Roma being used as "enhancement talent" to help build young stars. Roma would be fired less than three months later, due to kicking out from a pin attempt early in a match, where he lost to Alex Wright at SuperBrawl V. Orndorff remained with the company while also working as a trainer at the WCW Power Plant, until an injury cut his in ring career short at the end of 2000.

Orndorff died on July 12, 2021, from dementia at 71.

== Championships and accomplishments ==
- World Championship Wrestling
  - WCW World Tag Team Championship (2 times)
