= Halloween Havoc (1994) =

World Championship Wrestling pay-per-view event

- Promotional poster featuring Hulk Hogan and Ric Flair
- Promotion: World Championship Wrestling
- Date: October 23, 1994
- City: Detroit, Michigan
- Venue: Joe Louis Arena
- Attendance: 14,000
- Buy rate: 210,000
- Tagline: Witness the terrifying Rage in the Cage!

Pay-per-view chronology
← Previous; Fall Brawl	Next → AAA When Worlds Collide

Halloween Havoc chronology
← Previous; 1993	Next → 1995

The 1994 Halloween Havoc was the sixth annual Halloween Havoc professional wrestling pay-per-view (PPV) event produced by World Championship Wrestling (WCW). It took place on October 23, 1994, from the Joe Louis Arena in Detroit, Michigan.

== Production ==
=== Background ===
Halloween Havoc was an annual professional wrestling pay-per-view event produced by World Championship Wrestling (WCW) since 1989. As the name implies, it was a Halloween-themed show held in October. The 1994 event was the sixth event in the Halloween Havoc chronology and it took place on October 23, 1994, from the Joe Louis Arena in Detroit, Michigan.

=== Storylines ===
The event featured professional wrestling matches that involve different wrestlers from pre-existing scripted feuds and storylines. Professional wrestlers portray villains, heroes, or less distinguishable characters in the scripted events that build tension and culminate in a wrestling match or series of matches.

== Event ==
Other on-screen personnel
Role:	Name:
Commentators	Tony Schiavone
Commentators	Bobby Heenan
Interviewer	Gene Okerlund
Ring announcer	Gary Michael Cappetta
Ring announcer	Michael Buffer
Referees	Randy Anderson
Referees	Nick Patrick
Referees	Mr. T (Hogan vs. Flair)

Prior to the pay-per-view, on Main Event, Booker T defeated Brian Armstrong via pinfall after hitting a flying forearm. The match was originally scheduled to be Harlem Heat versus The Armstrongs, but Brad Armstrong had a family emergency, and did not appear. This marked the last PPV appearance of Brian Armstrong in WCW, he would move to the WWF and become "The Roadie" for Jeff Jarrett.

T. Graham Brown sang the Star-Spangled Banner.

The first pay-per-view match for the WCW World Television Championship saw the champion Johnny B. Badd and The Honky Tonk Man wrestle to a time-limit draw.

The next match saw Pretty Wonderful (Paul Orndorff & Paul Roma) winning the WCW World Tag Team Championship from the champions Stars and Stripes (The Patriot & Marcus Alexander Bagwell). Bagwell hit a fisherman's suplex on Orndorff, and as he went for the cover the referee's back was turned. This enabled Roma to hit Bagwell with an elbow off the top, and Orndoff to cover Bagwell for the victory.

Dave Sullivan then defeated Kevin Sullivan by countout.

In the following match, Dustin Rhodes defeated Arn Anderson. Anderson attempted to use the ropes for leverage during a cover of Rhodes, however, referee Randy Anderson caught him and broke the count. Rhodes used this distraction to roll up Anderson and record the victory via pinfall. After the match, Arn Anderson, frustrated with the loss, attacked Rhodes from behind & then DDT’ed him afterwards.

Prior to the next match, the entire match between Jim Duggan and Steve Austin from Fall Brawl, when Duggan won the title, was shown (the original match lasted 35 seconds). During the rematch, Duggan retained his title against Austin via disqualification. When Duggan attempted to hit Austin with a running clothesline, Austin avoided it and threw Duggan over the top rope, lead to Austin being to disqualified.

Next Big Van Vader defeated The Guardian Angel via pinfall following a jumping splash.

Then The Nasty Boys (Brian Knobbs & Jerry Sags) defeated Terry Funk & Bunkhouse Buck, after Meng accidentally hit Funk. The ending of the match saw Sags piledriving Funk on top of a Jack-o-lantern followed by Knobbs pinning Funk.

The main event saw Hulk Hogan battle Ric Flair in a Steel Cage match for the WCW World Heavyweight Championship with Mr. T as special guest referee. In addition, this was a career vs. career match. During the match, Sensuous Sherri attempted to climb the cage and hand Flair the championship. However, as Jimmy Hart attempted to stop her, he pulled off her skirt. As Sting attempted to come and help stop Sherri he was attacked by a masked man. This enabled Sherri to climb the cage and help Flair handcuff Mr. T. Hogan however was still able to pick up the victory following a leg drop. After the match, Hogan was attacked by a masked man who had been stalking him for months. Hogan eventually unmasked the man to reveal him as Brother Bruti. After the unmasking, Hogan was attacked by Bruti, Kevin Sullivan, and the debuting Avalanche, before Sting made the save.

== Results ==
No.	Results	Stipulations	Times
1^{ME}	Booker T (with Stevie Ray) defeated Brian Armstrong	Singles match	—
2	Johnny B. Badd (c) vs. The Honky Tonk Man ended in a time limit draw	Singles match for the WCW World Television Championship	10:00
3	Pretty Wonderful (Paul Orndorff and Paul Roma) defeated Stars and Stripes (The Patriot and Marcus Alexander Bagwell) (c)	Tag team match for the WCW World Tag Team Championship	13:47
4	Dave Sullivan defeated Kevin Sullivan by countout	Singles match	05:17
5	Dustin Rhodes defeated Arn Anderson (with Col. Robert Parker and Meng)	Singles match	09:50
6	Jim Duggan (c) defeated Steve Austin by disqualification	Singles match for the WCW United States Heavyweight Championship	08:02
7	Big Van Vader (with Harley Race) defeated The Guardian Angel	Singles match	08:17
8	The Nasty Boys (Brian Knobbs and Jerry Sags) defeated Terry Funk and Bunkhouse Buck (with Col. Robert Parker and Meng)	Tag team match	07:56
9	Hulk Hogan (c) (with Jimmy Hart) defeated Ric Flair (with Sensuous Sherri)	Retirement Steel Cage match for the WCW World Heavyweight Championship with Mr. T as special guest referee	19:25
(c) / – the champion(s) heading into the match; ME / – the match was broadcast prior to the pay-per-view on Main Event
