= Hulkamania: Let The Battle Begin =

Professional wrestling tour in Australia

- Date: 2009
- City: Melbourne; Perth; Brisbane; Sydney
- Venue: Rod Laver Arena; Burswood Dome; Brisbane Entertainment Centre; Acer Arena
- Attendance: 5,000

Hulkamania: Let The Battle Begin Tour was a 2009 professional wrestling tour promoted by Hulk Hogan and Eric Bischoff, which took place in Australia. These events featured the first wrestling appearance of Hogan in Australia. The event was taped by ONE HD but the footage was never released in any form.

== Background ==
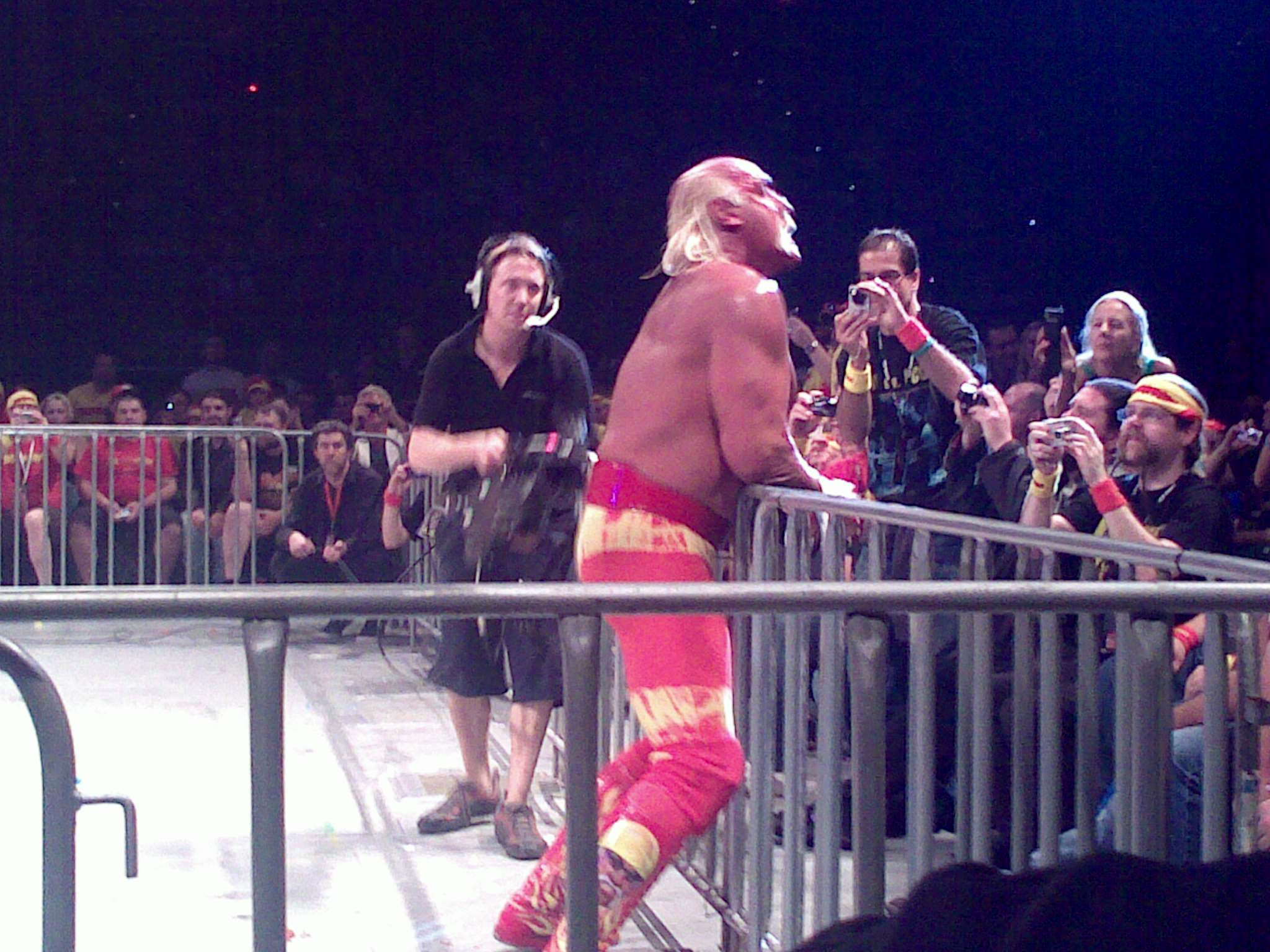
Hogan during a match against Ric Flair in 2009

Shows took place on 21, 24, 26 and 28 November 2009. The main event of each show was between Hulk Hogan and Ric Flair. Flair, performing as a heel, came out of retirement for this. Other wrestlers featured included Spartan-3000, Heidenreich, Eugene, Brutus "The Barber" Beefcake and Orlando Jordan. Hogan won all four main events in the tour.

On 21 November Lacey Von Erich won a bikini contest, which also included Koa Marie Turner, Stephanie Pietz and Kiara Dillon. She also interfered in the main event between Hogan and Ric Flair, on Flair's behalf. In other matches on the tour she was used as Flair's manager.

There was talk of another tour in China and other parts of Asia, however after the unsuccessful Australian tour, those plans fell through. The tour featured Umaga's last match, as he died on 4 December 2009.

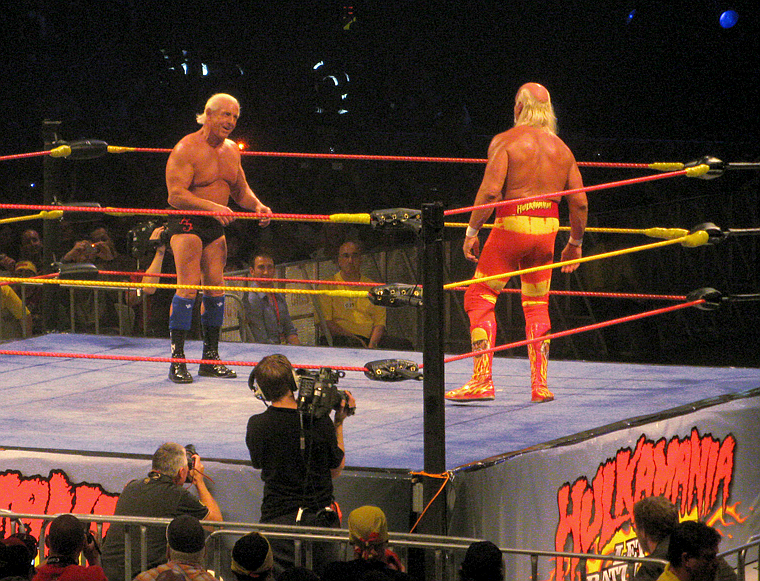
The Main Event of Hulkamania Tour in 2009, Ric Flair vs. Hulk Hogan

== Results ==
=== Night 1 Melbourne ===
No.	Results	Stipulations
1	Nick Dinsmore and The Pimp Fatha defeated Rock of Love (Billy Blade and Kadin Anthony)	Tag team match
2	Brutus Beefcake defeated Heidenreich	Singles match
3	Spartan 3000 defeated Shannon Moore	Singles match
4	The Nasty Boys (Brian Knobbs and Jerry Sags) defeated Vampire Warrior and Black Pearl	Australia Street Fight
5	Mr. Anderson defeated Sean Morley	Singles match
6	Brian Christopher and Kishi defeated Orlando Jordan and Osu Fatu	Tag team match
7	Hulk Hogan defeated Ric Flair	Singles match

=== Night 2 Perth ===
No.	Results	Stipulations
1	Brian Christopher and Kishi defeated Rock of Love (Billy Blade and Kadin Anthony)	Tag team match
2	Shannon Moore defeated Spartan 3000	Singles match
3	Big Daddy Row Row defeated Sean Morley and The Pimp Fatha	Triple threat match
4	Black Pearl, Heidenreich and Vampire Warrior defeated The Nasty Boys (Brian Knobbs and Jerry Sags) and Nick Dinsmore	Six-man tag team match
5	Orlando Jordan defeated Mr. Anderson	Singles match
6	Osu Fatu defeated Brutus Beefcake	Singles match
7	Hulk Hogan (with Jimmy Hart) defeated Ric Flair (with Lacey Von Erich)	No Disqualification match

=== Night 3 Brisbane ===
No.	Results	Stipulations
1	The Pimp Fatha defeated Heidenreich	Singles match
2	Shannon Moore vs. Spartan 3000 ended in a time limit draw	Singles match
3	Sean Morley defeated Nick Dinsmore	Singles match
4	Brutus Beefcake and Mr. Anderson defeated Orlando Jordan and Osu Fatu	Tag team match
5	The Nasty Boys (Brian Knobbs and Jerry Sags), Brian Christopher and Kishi defeated Rock of Love (Billy Blade and Kadin Anthony), Black Pearl and Vampire Warrior	Eight-man tag team elimination match
6	Hulk Hogan (with Jimmy Hart) defeated Ric Flair (with Lacey Von Erich)	Singles match

=== Night 4 Sydney ===
No.	Results	Stipulations
1	Sean Morley defeated The Pimp Fatha	Singles match
2	Rock of Love (Billy Blade and Kadin Anthony) vs. The Nasty Boys (Brian Knobbs and Jerry Sags) ended in a double disqualification	Tag team match
3	Nick Dinsmore defeated Heidenreich	Singles match
4	Brian Christopher and Kishi defeated Black Pearl and Vampire Warrior	Tag team match
5	Orlando Jordan defeated Brutus Beefcake	Singles match
6	Shannon Moore defeated Spartan 3000	Ladder match for $25,000
7	Mr. Anderson defeated Osu Fatu	Singles match
8	Hulk Hogan (with Jimmy Hart) defeated Ric Flair (with Lacey Von Erich)	Singles match

== See also ==
- Professional wrestling in Australia
- List of professional wrestling organisations in Australia
