= Jerry Sags =

American professional wrestler (born 1964)

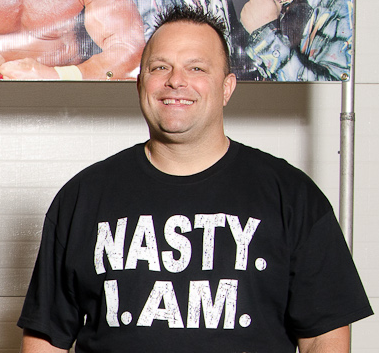
- Sags in 2011

Personal information
- Born: Jerome Saganowich; July 5, 1964 (age 62) Hokendauqua, Pennsylvania, U.S.
- Spouse: Laura Rubio (m. 1982)
- Children: 4

Professional wrestling career
- Ring name(s): Jerry Saganowich; Jerry Sags
- Billed height: 6 ft 3 in (191 cm)
- Billed weight: 280 lb (127 kg)
- Billed from: Allentown, Pennsylvania, U.S. "Nastyville"
- Trained by: Brad Rheingans
- Debut: October 4, 1986
- Retired: 2019

Jerome Saganowich (born July 5, 1964) is an American retired professional wrestler, better known by his ring name, Jerry Sags. He is best known for tag teaming with Brian Knobbs as the Nasty Boys. Over the course of his career, Sags wrestled for promotions including the American Wrestling Association, All Japan Pro Wrestling, World Championship Wrestling, the World Wrestling Federation, and New Japan Pro-Wrestling, holding championships such as the WCW World Tag Team Championship and WWF Tag Team Championship.

== Early life and education ==
Saganowich was born on July 5, 1964, in Hokendauqua, Pennsylvania. He attended and graduated from Whitehall High School in Whitehall Township, Pennsylvania, where he played football for the Whitehall Zephyrs. During this time, he befriended Brian Yandrisovitz.

== Professional wrestling career ==
=== Early career (1986–1988) ===
While working as a bouncer, Sags met Steve Burker, a friend of professional wrestler George "The Animal" Steele, who encouraged him to attend the Verne Gagne Wrestling School in Hamel, Minnesota. Enrolling in the school alongside Yandrisovitz, Sags was trained to wrestle by Brad Rheingans. He began his career in October 1986 in Gagne's Minneapolis, Minnesota-based American Wrestling Association, wrestling as "Jerry Saganowich". In early 1987, he adopted the ring name "Jerry Sags" and formed a tag team, "the Nasty Boys", with Yandrisovitz, who had adopted the ring name Brian Knobbs. Sags and Knobbs left the AWA in June 1987.

In July 1987, Sags and Knobbs joined the Memphis, Tennessee-based Continental Wrestling Association. In September 1987, they defeated Badd Company for the AWA Southern Tag Team Championship; they lost the titles to the Rock 'n' Roll RPMs later that month. In October 1987, they defeated the Rock 'n' Roll RPMs to win the titles for a second time, but lost the titles back to them a week later. They left the CWA in January 1988.

In January 1988, the Nasty Boys returned to the AWA. They faced the Midnight Rockers in several bouts for the AWA World Tag Team Championship, but failed to win the titles. They left the AWA once more in April 1988.

=== Professional Wrestling Federation (1988–1990) ===
In mid-1988, the Nasty Boys joined the Florida-based Professional Wrestling Federation (PWF). In November 1988, they defeated Johnny Ace and The Terminator for the PWF Tag Team Championship. In January 1989, they lost the titles back to Ace and The Terminator. They defeated Ace and The Terminator to win the titles for a second time in March 1989, but lost them to Southern Force (Black Bart and Bobby Jaggers) several days later. In June 1989, they defeated Bart and Tony Anthony to become three-time PWF Tag Team Champions. They lost the titles to Brett Sawyer and Jim Backlund on an unrecorded date, but regained them in August 1989. In October 1989, they lost the titles to Dennis Knight and Jumbo Baretta. In January 1990, they won the titles for a fifth and final time, defeating Bounty Hunter #1 and The Terminator at a PWF event in Nassau, Bahamas. They lost the titles to Kendall Windham and Robert Fuller on an unrecorded date. They left the PWF in mid-1990.

=== All Japan Pro Wrestling (1989) ===
In November and December 1989, the Nasty Boys wrestled in Japan for All Japan Pro Wrestling. They competed in the Real World Tag League for the vacant World Tag Team Championship, tying with The Great Kabuki and Shunji Takano in last place after losing eight matches and winning one.

=== World Championship Wrestling (1990) ===
In August 1990, the Nasty Boys began wrestling for the Carolinas-based National Wrestling Alliance (NWA)-affiliate World Championship Wrestling (WCW). In their debut match, on NWA Main Event, they defeated Barry Horowitz and Dave Diamond. The following month, at Clash of the Champions XII, they defeated Jackie Fulton and Terry Taylor. In October 1990, the Nasty Boys began feuding with the Steiner Brothers over the NWA United States Tag Team Championship (Mid-Atlantic version), including a bout at Halloween Havoc in Chicago, Illinois on October 27. In November 1990, they faced the Steiner Brothers in a series of cage matches. The Nasty Boys left WCW in December 1990 to join the World Wrestling Federation.

=== World Wrestling Federation (1990–1993) ===
In December 1990, the Nasty Boys joined the World Wrestling Federation (WWF), aligning themselves with Jimmy Hart. The following month, at the Royal Rumble, Sags defeated Sam Houston in a dark match. Following a feud with the Bushwhackers, at WrestleMania VII in March 1991 they defeated the Hart Foundation for the WWF World Tag Team Championship after Sags struck Jim Neidhart with a motorcycle helmet. After WrestleMania, they began feuding with the Legion of Doom. At SummerSlam in August 1991, the Legion of Doom defeated them in a street fight to win the titles.

In September 1991, Sags entered the King of the Ring tournament, defeating Road Warrior Hawk in the first round, but losing to Irwin R. Schyster in the semi-final. At Survivor Series in November 1991, the Nasty Boys teamed with the Beverly Brothers to defeat the Bushwhackers and the Rockers in a Survivor Series match. Over the following months, they had a series of matches with the Bushwhackers, the Rockers, and Jim Duggan and Sgt. Slaughter. At the Royal Rumble in January 1992, Sags entered at number four, being eliminated by the British Bulldog.

At WrestleMania VIII in April 1992, they teamed with Repo Man and The Mountie in a loss to Duggan, Slaughter, Big Boss Man, and Virgil. Following WrestleMania, they had a series of matches against Jim Powers and Owen Hart, then against High Energy (Hart and Koko B. Ware). In a dark match at SummerSlam in August 1992, they teamed with the Mountie in a loss to Duggan and the Bushwhackers.

In autumn 1992, the Nasty Boys parted ways with Jimmy Hart and turned face, feuding with the Natural Disasters. At Survivor Series in November 1992, they teamed with the Natural Disasters to defeat the Beverly Brothers and Money Inc. (Ted DiBiase and Irwin R. Schyster) in an elimination match in which they were the sole survivors. Following Survivor Series, they began feuding with Money Inc. over the WWF World Tag Team Championship, but were unable to win the titles. At the Royal Rumble in January 1993, Sags entered at number 20, being eliminated by Owen Hart.

In March 1993, the Nasty Boys began feuding with the Headshrinkers. They left the WWF in April 1993 following its spring tour of Europe.

=== World Championship Wrestling (1993–1997) ===
In July 1993, the Nasty Boys returned to World Championship Wrestling, were they were paired with manager Missy Hyatt. In September 1993 at Fall Brawl '93: War Games, they defeated Arn Anderson and Paul Roma for the WCW World Tag Team Championship. The following month, they lost the titles to 2 Cold Scorpio and Marcus Alexander Bagwell in a bout that aired on WCW Saturday Night. They regained the titles in a rematch the following month at Halloween Havoc.

In late 1993, the Nasty Boys took part in WCW's tour of Europe. At Clash of the Champions XXV in November 1993, they defeated Davey Boy Smith and Sting. At Battlebowl in November 1993, Sags qualified for the titular battle royal, which was won by Vader. At Starrcade '93: 10th Anniversary, they defended their titles against Road Warrior Hawk and Sting, who won the bout by disqualification, meaning the titles did not change hands. (Due to an incident during the match at Starrcade, Hyatt left WCW in February 1994.)

In January 1994 at Clash of the Champions XXVI, the Nasty Boys lost to Cactus Jack and Maxx Payne in a non-title match. At SuperBrawl IV in February 1994, Jack and Payne challenged the Nasty Boys for the WCW World Tag Team Championship, winning by disqualification. At Spring Stampede, the Nasty Boys defeated Jack and Payne in a Chicago street fight. At Slamboree '94: A Legends' Reunion in May 1994, the Nasty Boys once again defended their titles against Jack and Kevin Sullivan in a Broad Street Bully match with Dave Schultz as special guest referee; Jack and Sullivan defeated them to win the titles following interference by Payne and Evad Sullivan. In June 1994 at Clash of the Champions XXVII, the Nasty Boys challenged Jack and Sullivan in a rematch, but failed to regain the titles.

In August 1994, the Nasty Boys began feuding with Pretty Wonderful, who they defeated at Clash of the Champions XXVIII. In September 1994, they took part in the "Hulkamania" tour of Europe. They went on to feud with the Stud Stable At Fall Brawl '94: War Games later that month, they teamed with Dustin Rhodes and Dusty Rhodes to defeat the Stud Stable in a WarGames match. At Halloween Havoc in October 1994, they defeated the Stud Stable.

In late 1994, the Nasty Boys began feuding with Harlem Heat, who defeated them at Clash of the Champions XXIX. At Starrcade '94: Triple Threat in December 1994, they defeated Harlem Heat by disqualification. After Harlem Heat won the WCW World Tag Team Championship, the Nasty Boys began challenging them for the titles. At SuperBrawl V in February 1995, the Nasty Boys lost to Harlem Heat by disqualification. At Uncensored the following month, they defeated Harlem Heat in a non-title match. On May 21, 1995 at Slamboree '95: A Legends' Reunion, they defeated Harlem Heat for their third and final WCW World Tag Team Championship; their reign ended when they lost the titles back to Harlem Heat in a match that aired on WCW WorldWide on June 24 (but which was pre-recorded on May 3, prior to their winning the titles).

In June 1995, the Nasty Boys began feuding with the Blue Bloods. At Bash at the Beach in July 1995, they faced WCW World Tag Team Champions Harlem Heat and the Blue Bloods in a triangle match that was won by Harlem Heat.

In December 1995 at World War 3, Sags took part in the titular World War 3 match for the vacant WCW World Heavyweight Championship, which was won by Randy Savage.

In January 1996, the Nasty Boys began feuding with the Public Enemy, who they wrestled to a double disqualification at Clash of the Champions XXXII that month. At SuperBrawl VI in February 1996, they defeated the Public Enemy in a falls count anywhere match. At Bash at the Beach in July 1996, they defeated the Public Enemy in a dog collar match.

At Fall Brawl '96: War Games in September 1996, the Nasty Boys unsuccessfully challenged Harlem Heat for the WCW World Tag Team Championship.

On the September 23, 1996 episode of WCW Monday Nitro, Hollywood Hulk Hogan attempted to entice the Nasty Boys into joining his New World Order (nWo) stable. Over the following weeks, the Nasty Boys fraternized with the nWo. The angle culminated on the October 14 episode of WCW Monday Nitro, when the Nasty Boys came to the ring with the nWo wearing their t-shirts in anticipation of signing contracts to join the stable, only for the nWo to turn on them and beat them down. In November 1995 at World War 3, the Nasty Boys and the Faces of Fear both challenged nWo members the Outsiders for the WCW World Tag Team Championship, but failed to win the titles. The Nasty Boys went on to feud with the Outsiders.

During a match in November 1996, Sags received a stiff chair shot to the back of the head from Scott Hall, concussing him. During a match in Shreveport, Louisiana on January 4, 1997, Sags received another stiff blow to the back of the head; believing Hall had given him another chair shot, he became enraged and legitimately punched Hall, knocking his tooth out. Later, upon viewing footage of the incident, Sags realized that Hall's partner Kevin Nash had in fact been the one to strike him. The incident led to the Nasty Boys leaving WCW in February 1997, with Sags retiring.

=== New Japan Pro-Wrestling (1993–1995) ===
The Nasty Boys debuted in New Japan Pro-Wrestling (NJPW) in August 1993 as part of its G1 Climax event in the Ryogoku Kokugikan in Tokyo. During their five day tour, they wrestled opponents including the Hell Raisers, Raging Staff (Hiro Saito and Super Strong Machine), and King Haku and the Barbarian. In November 1993, the Nasty Boys returned to NJPW as part of its "Battle Final" tour. In December 1993, they unsuccessfully challenged the Jurassic Powers for the IWGP Tag Team Championship.

In June to July 1994, the Nasty Boys returned to NJPW as part of its "Summer Struggle" event, facing teams such as J-J-Jacks and the Steiner Brothers. They made a further tour in March 1995 as part of the "Muscle Storm" event. They wrestled their final matches for NJPW in November 1995 as part of the two-night "WCW World in Japan" event jointly promoted by NJPW and WCW, defeating Ookami Gundan in the Hamamatsu Arena in Hamamatsu, Shizuoka on the first night, then losing to Masa Saito and Riki Choshu in the Ryōgoku Kokugikan in Tokyo on the second night.

=== Late career (2001-2019) ===
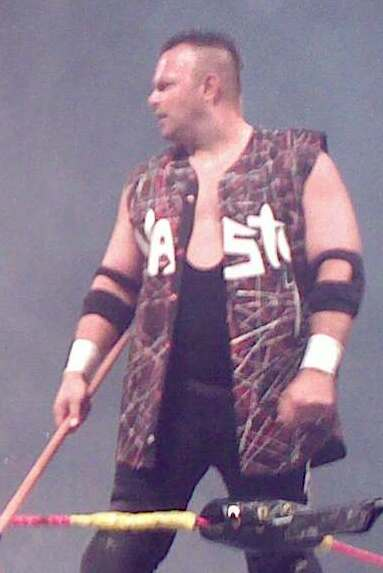
Sags at Hulkamania: Let The Battle Begin in Melbourne, Australia, in November 2009

Sags returned to wrestling in 2001 as a trainer. He reformed the Nasty Boys with Knobbs, appearing with the short-lived X Wrestling Federation (XWF), the World Wrestling Council in Puerto Rico, and Lutte Familiale in Montreal, Quebec. He retired again in 2003

Sags returned to the ring once more in 2006. In 2007, he reformed the Nasty Boys with Knobbs once again. On November 20, 2007, The Nasty Boys competed at the WWE SmackDown! tapings in Tampa, Florida, wrestling in their first WWE match in over 14 years. The Nasty Boys were accused of being unprofessionally stiff with their opponents, Dave Taylor and Drew McIntyre.

On January 4, 2010, the Nasty Boys made an appearance on Total Nonstop Action Wrestling's TNA Impact!, feuding with Team 3D. On the January 21 edition of Impact!, the Nasty Boys competed in their first match for TNA, defeating the team of Eric Young and Kevin Nash. At Against All Odds, the Nasty Boys defeated Team 3D in a tag team match, when Jimmy Hart made his return to the company and interfered in the match on the Nasty Boys' behalf. On the February 25 edition of Impact!, Team 3D defeated the Nasty Boys in a tables match with Jesse Neal interfering on Team 3D's behalf. The Nasty Boys and Hart continued their feud with Team 3D, defeating them and the returning Brother Runt, a replacement for Jesse Neal who The Nastys attacked prior to a six-man tag team match. After the match, Neal attacked the Nastys and helped Team 3D throw Sags through a table. On March 29, 2010, the Nasty Boys were released by TNA following an incident at a TNA function attended by Spike TV executives.

From 2010 to 2019, Sags wrestled sporadically on the independent circuit, primarily in tag team matches with Knobbs. He wrestled the final match of his career on October 26, 2019.

== Professional wrestling style and persona ==
As one-half of the Nasty Boys, Sags portrayed a "mohawked thug", "sweaty, toothless punk", and "tough degenerate".

Sags wrestled in a brawling, "smash-mouth" style. His finishing move was a diving elbow drop. His signature moves included the "Pitstop" (where he would rub an opponents face in his armpit). As one-half of the Nasty Boys, his finisher was the "Trip to Nastyville": a running powerslam by Knobbs, followed by a diving elbow drop from Sags.

== Personal life ==
Saganowich and his wife Laura have four children, daughters Chloe and Madison, and sons Seve and Jax. They reside in Treasure Island, Florida near Brian Knobbs and Hulk Hogan until his death in July 2025. Saganowich's sister-in-law Michelle was married to professional wrestler Dusty Rhodes.

In January 1994, Saganowich was stabbed during an altercation in Peoria, Illinois. Three people were subsequently arrested and charged with aggravated battery, armed violence, mob action with injury, and weapons violations.

In 2011, Saganowich appeared in an episode of Man vs. Food in the show's Tampa, Florida episode, where he won his challenge.

== Championships and accomplishments ==
- Cauliflower Alley Club
  - Tag Team Award (2023) – with Brian Knobbs
- Flemish Wrestling Force
  - FWF Tag Team Championship (1 time) - with Joe E. Legend
- Championship Wrestling International
  - CWI Tag Team Championship (1 time) – with Brian Knobbs
- Continental Wrestling Association
  - AWA Southern Tag Team Championship (2 times) – with Brian Knobbs
- North American Wrestling Association / South Atlantic Pro Wrestling
  - NAWA/SAPW Tag Team Championship (1 time) – with Brian Knobbs
- Professional Wrestling Federation
  - PWF Tag Team Championship (5 times) – with Brian Knobbs
- Pro Wrestling Illustrated
  - PWI Tag Team of the Year award in 1994 – with Brian Knobbs
  - PWI ranked him #420 of the 500 best singles wrestlers during the "PWI Years" in 2003
  - PWI ranked him #53 of the 100 best tag teams of the "PWI Years" with Brian Knobbs in 2003.
- World Championship Wrestling
  - WCW World Tag Team Championship (3 times) – with Brian Knobbs
- World Wrestling Federation
  - WWF Tag Team Championship (1 time) – with Brian Knobbs
- X Wrestling Federation
  - XWF World Tag Team Championship (1 time) – with Brian Knobbs
