= Stars and Stripes (professional wrestling) =

Professional wrestling tag team

Tag team
- Members: The Patriot; Marcus Alexander Bagwell
- Billed heights: Patriot: 6 ft 5 in (1.96 m); Bagwell: 6 ft 1 in (1.85 m)
- Combined billed weight: 522 lb (237 kg; 37.3 st)
- Billed from: United States of America
- Debut: May 28, 1994
- Disbanded: May 5, 1995

Stars and Stripes was a professional wrestling tag team in World Championship Wrestling composed of The Patriot and Marcus Alexander Bagwell.

== History ==
Stars and Stripes was formed in WCW in the summer of 1994 when The Patriot and Marcus Bagwell formed a face (fan favorite) tag team. Bagwell, who had previously held the WCW World Tag Team Championship while teaming with 2 Cold Scorpio, got wrestling gear to match The Patriot's patriotic look. Stars and Stripes teamed for the first time on May 28 episode of Saturday Night, defeating Dick Slater and Chris Sullivan in a tag team match.

Shortly after the pair began teaming, Pretty Wonderful (Paul Roma and Paul Orndorff) won the WCW World Tag Team Championship. Bagwell and The Patriot faced the new champions in a series of non-title matches on house shows. They defeated Roma and Orndorff in the majority of the matches, but they were unable to win the title belts during a match between the teams at Fall Brawl on September 18. They faced each other one week later on the September 25 episode of Saturday Night, and Stars and Stripes won the match and the championship.

Bagwell and The Patriot defended the title in a series of rematches over the next month, but they dropped the belts back to Pretty Wonderful at Halloween Havoc 1994 on October 23. The feud continued between the teams, and Stars and Stripes regained the championship on November 16 at Clash of the Champions XXIX. Had Roma and Orndorff won the match, The Patriot would have been forced to remove his mask.

The team defended the belts against a series of challenger but lost them in a match with Harlem Heat on December 8 during a taping of WCW Saturday Night. They were unable to regain them in subsequent rematches; the match was not aired for several weeks, however, so Stars and Stripes continued to be billed as champions at events until the match was shown on television. Bagwell and The Patriot resumed their rivalry with Pretty Wonderful and were given a title match against Harlem Heat at Clash of the Champions XXX, but the champions retained the belts.

In February 1995, Stars and Stripes began a series of matches with The Blue Bloods (Lord Steven Regal and Earl Robert Eaton). They also wrestled Romeo Valentino and Dino Casanova at SuperBrawl V in a dark match and defeated them in one minute and ten seconds. After the match, Bagwell and The Patriot were attacked by Big Van Vader. The team continued to face Harlem Heat and The Blue Bloods (with Steve Austin substituting for Bobby Eaton). They wrestled in another dark match at Uncensored 1995, defeating the team of Bunkhouse Buck and Dick Slater.

In May 1995, The Patriot was entered in a tournament for the vacant WCW United States Championship, but was eliminated in the first round by Ric Flair. Shortly thereafter, the team disbanded when The Patriot left WCW. Bagwell remained in WCW, holding the tag team belts once more while teaming with Scotty Riggs to form The American Males.

== Championships and accomplishments ==
- World Championship Wrestling
  - WCW World Tag Team Championship (2 times)
