= WCW Main Event =

- WCW Main Event logo
- Also known as: NWA Main Event
- Created by: Jim Crockett Promotions / World Championship Wrestling
- Starring: See World Championship Wrestling alumni
- Country of origin: United States

Production
- Camera setup: Multicamera setup
- Running time: 60 minutes per episode

Original release
- Network: TBS
- Release: April 3, 1988 – January 3, 1998

Related
- WWE Main Event (2012–present)

WCW Main Event, originally NWA Main Event, is an American televised wrestling program of World Championship Wrestling (WCW) that aired from April 3, 1988 to January 3, 1998. For most of its run, it was the promotion's secondary show and aired on Sunday evenings on TBS. The show originally aired in 1988 as NWA Main Event. The rights to WCW Main Event now belong to WWE.

== History ==
Jim Crockett Promotions's NWA World Championship Wrestling, along with its predecessor (Georgia Championship Wrestling), were Saturday night mainstays on TBS for almost 30 years. Throughout much of the 1970s and 1980s, these two Saturday night wrestling programs were also complemented with a Sunday night wrestling program titled Best of World Championship Wrestling. The Sunday editions were mostly presented as a magazine format, featuring sit-down interviews with wrestlers and footage from other GCW and JCP television programming. In later years, airings of the Sunday edition became infrequent, as these airings were frequently pre-empted by TBS' coverage of the Atlanta Braves and the Atlanta Hawks.

In early 1988, Ted Turner asked Jim Crockett, Jr. to create a new Sunday evening wrestling show featuring exclusive "main event caliber" matches. In 1988, NWA Main Event made its debut. The debut episode featured a main event match pitting Ric Flair, Arn Anderson and Tully Blanchard against Sting, Lex Luger and Barry Windham. The show proved to be an instant ratings success. Due to surmounting losses, Crockett was forced to sell JCP in November 1988 to Turner, who renamed the organization World Championship Wrestling.

The format for WCW Main Event kept one match that was regarded as "main event caliber" and would almost always feature one of WCW's top stars. Often, two or more matches would be featured, but by 1995 the format for the program slightly changed. Main Event would feature, in addition to its one featured match at the end of the program, matches that had aired on WCW Pro, WCW Saturday Night, and WCW WorldWide earlier in the weekend. When WCW Monday Nitro premiered later in 1995, matches from that program would also be featured.

On pay-per-view nights, Main Event would always air live from the venue where the pay-per-view was taking place and would feature multiple matches involving mid-carders and up-and-coming stars.

=== Title changes ===
Throughout the years, WCW Main Event has had numerous title changes.

- The Young Pistols (Steve Armstrong and Tracy Smothers) defeated The Patriots (Todd Champion and Firebreaker Chip) to win the WCW United States Tag Team Championship on December 15, 1991 (taped November 5, 1991)
- Ron Simmons and Big Josh defeated The Young Pistols (Steve Armstrong and Tracy Smothers) to win the WCW United States Tag Team Championship on February 16, 1992 (taped January 14, 1992)
- Dick Slater and The Barbarian defeated The Fabulous Freebirds (Jimmy Garvin and Michael Hayes) to win the WCW United States Tag Team Championship on July 12, 1992 (taped June 25, 1992)
- Ron Simmons defeated Big Van Vader to win the WCW World Heavyweight Championship on August 16, 1992 (taped August 2, 1992)
- Stars and Stripes (The Patriot and Marcus Alexander Bagwell) defeated Pretty Wonderful (Paul Orndorff and Paul Roma) to win the WCW World Tag Team Championship on September 25, 1994 (live show)
- Arn Anderson defeated Johnny B. Badd to win the WCW World Television Championship on January 8, 1995 (live show)
- Konnan defeated One Man Gang to win the WCW United States Heavyweight Championship on February 4, 1996 (taped January 29, 1996)

== The WCW gauntlet ==
In 1989, Turner also added a Friday night (later moved to Saturday mornings) wrestling show called NWA Power Hour. With three wrestling shows on TBS, WCW execs decided to create a unique feature called "Running the Gauntlet", which would have a select wrestler compete on all three TBS wrestling shows on a particular weekend, with the objective of winning all three of their matches (including singles and tag matches). Any wrestler who successfully ran the gauntlet won (kayfabe) $15,000. If a wrestler failed to win any one of their matches, their three scheduled opponents in their failing effort (including a loss or a draw) would split the $15,000. The Gauntlet format was eventually dropped in 1990/91. Only two wrestlers (The Steiner Brothers) managed to successfully run the gauntlet.

== PPV pre-shows ==
In the mid-1990s, WCW Main Event would be used as a live pre-show that aired before most WCW pay-per-view events. These special episodes would be used not only to promote the pay-per-view, but also to have special matches - which at any other time would be considered dark matches - prior to the pay-per-view. The last WCW Main Event episode to serve as a PPV pre-show aired July 7, 1996, leading up to Bash at the Beach.

One episode of WCW Main Event originated live in an outdoor environment: the episode prior to the 1995 Bash at the Beach.

== Later years and the end ==
Starting August 24, 1996, the show moved from its established Sunday evening time slot to Saturday mornings. Starting around 1997, WCW Main Event was re-tooled as a recap show with some "exclusive" matches. On January 3, 1998, the show was cancelled and was replaced by WCW Thunder which was launched 5 days later.
