= Paul Roma =

American professional wrestler (born 1960)

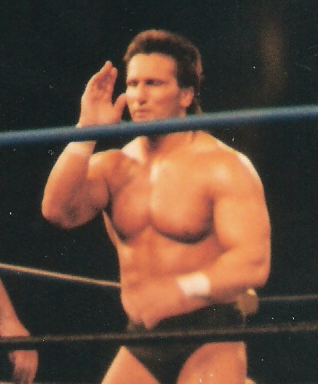
- Roma in 1994

Personal information
- Born: Paul Centopani; April 29, 1960 (age 66) Kensington, New York, U.S.

Professional wrestling career
- Ring name: Paul Roma
- Billed height: 5 ft 11 in (180 cm)
- Billed weight: 235 lb (107 kg)
- Trained by: Tony Altomare; Mr. Fuji
- Debut: December 17, 1984
- Retired: December 11, 2021

Paul Centopani (born April 29, 1959) is an American retired professional wrestler and boxer, better known by his ring name Paul Roma. He is best known for his time in the World Wrestling Federation and World Championship Wrestling between 1984 and 1995.

== Professional wrestling career ==
=== World Wrestling Federation (1984–1991) ===
==== Early career (1984–1987) ====
Centopani was trained to wrestle by Tony Altomare. He made his professional wrestling debut on December 17, 1984, with the World Wrestling Federation at a WWF All American Wrestling taping in Poughkeepsie, New York, teaming with Salvatore Bellomo in a loss to the Tag Team Champions Adrian Adonis and Dick Murdoch.

Roma primarily wrestled as a face during this time, and despite being successful over other preliminary wrestlers, he would still hold defeats to more-established superstars at the time such as Bret "Hitman" Hart, "Macho Man" Randy Savage, and Ace Cowboy Bob Orton at both TV shows and untelevised events.

==== The Young Stallions (1987–1989) ====
Roma was teamed with fellow preliminary wrestler Jim Powers in what at first likely seemed to be a one-time pairing on March 21, 1987, at a WWF Superstars taping in Las Vegas, Nevada. Losing to Demolition (Ax and Smash), Roma & Powers also lost televised matches to The New Dream Team (Greg "The Hammer" Valentine and Dino Bravo) (March 22) and "The Natural" Butch Reed, The Iron Sheik, and Nikolai Volkoff (April 23). Finally, a bit of success came at a WWF Superstars taping on April 24 when the two teamed with Tito Santana in a winning effort against Bob Orton, Don Muraco and Tiger Chung Lee. Shortly after Roma and Powers began teaming on the house show circuit, losing to Demolition and defeating fellow preliminary team The Shadows (Randy Colley & Jose Luis Rivera). Meanwhile, on television, Roma & Powers again lost to Demolition in May on WWF Superstars, followed by a loss to the Dream Team on Wrestling Challenge. According to both Roma and Powers, they were put together because of their physiques and because were fairly similar in build and overall athleticism.

The team's first significant victory came in a huge upset victory over Bob Orton and Don Muraco at Madison Square Garden on May 18. The match aired on Prime Time Wrestling later that month. Roma & Powers followed this with televised victories over The Shadows in June. Their momentum was quickly squashed when the duo teamed with Mario Mancini and Don Driggers in a squash match loss on June 20 to the newly formed Heenan Family (King Kong Bundy, Big John Studd, King Harley Race and a returning Paul Orndorff). For the next two months Roma and Powers would wrestle The Islanders (Haku and Tama) on house shows, where they were winless.

The team's first big break came on August 8, 1987, when they faced WWF Tag-Team Champions The Hart Foundation (Bret Hart and Jim "The Anvil" Neidhart) in a non-title match. Roma and Powers scored a tremendous upset victory in a reversed victory. Mr. T was reportedly planned to be their manager, but these plans never materialized.

The win was the beginning of a push for the team, which soon began winning multiple encounters with Muraco and Orton on the house show circuit as the summer closed. Another huge upset victory came on August 20 when they upended Kamala and Sika via countout on WWF Superstars. On August 30 they again defeated The Hart Foundation, this time via disqualification in a match on Prime Time. Meanwhile, on the house show circuit the team won several encounters with The New Dream Team.

That fall the Roma and Powers pairing finally received an official moniker, The Young Stallions. The team seemingly received their name by accident when play-by-play commentator (and WWF owner) Vince McMahon referred to them once as "a couple of young stallions", thus naming the team. The Stallions would soon acquire the music intended for the Hart Foundation, "Crank it Up", and entered a short feud with the WWF Tag-Team Champions. The Stallions had a Saturday Night's Main Event XII matchup, where they narrowly fell to The Hart Foundation in a great match that aired on October 3. This did little to stall the momentum that the team now had, and Roma and Powers scored the biggest victory of their careers when they became one of only two surviving teams alongside The Killer Bees ("Jumping" Jim Brunzell and B. Brian Blair) in the elimination tag team match at the first annual Survivor Series pay-per-view on November 26, 1987, eliminating the New Dream Team during the course of the match.

On December 26, 1987, the Stallions were scheduled to face The Hart Foundation in Buffalo, NY. Neidhart did not appear at the event, and the match was then switched to a singles match between Powers and Bret "Hitman" Hart. That night Powers scored a substantial upset when he pinned the future WWF World Champion. Following the match, Hart complained that the loss was a fluke and volunteered to take on Paul Roma. Another match followed, and Roma also pinned Hart.

The Stallions success took a small hit at the 1988 Royal Rumble, where Roma and Powers lost a best of three falls match to The Islanders in two straight falls. Despite this Roma & Powers continued to enjoy success that winter, winning house show encounters with The Bolsheviks (Nikolai Volkhoff and Boris Zhukov), The Alaskans (Dave Wagner and Rick Renslow), and The Conquistadors. The latter had many matches taking place in the original Boston Garden. On March 3, 1988, nearly a year after their initial encounter Roma and Powers again faced Demolition (Ax now with Barry Darsow as Smash) on Prime Time Wrestling. This time the match was much closer, with Demolition winning. The teams would later face on a house show match in Lugano, Switzerland on April 1, with the Stallions scoring a huge upset victory.

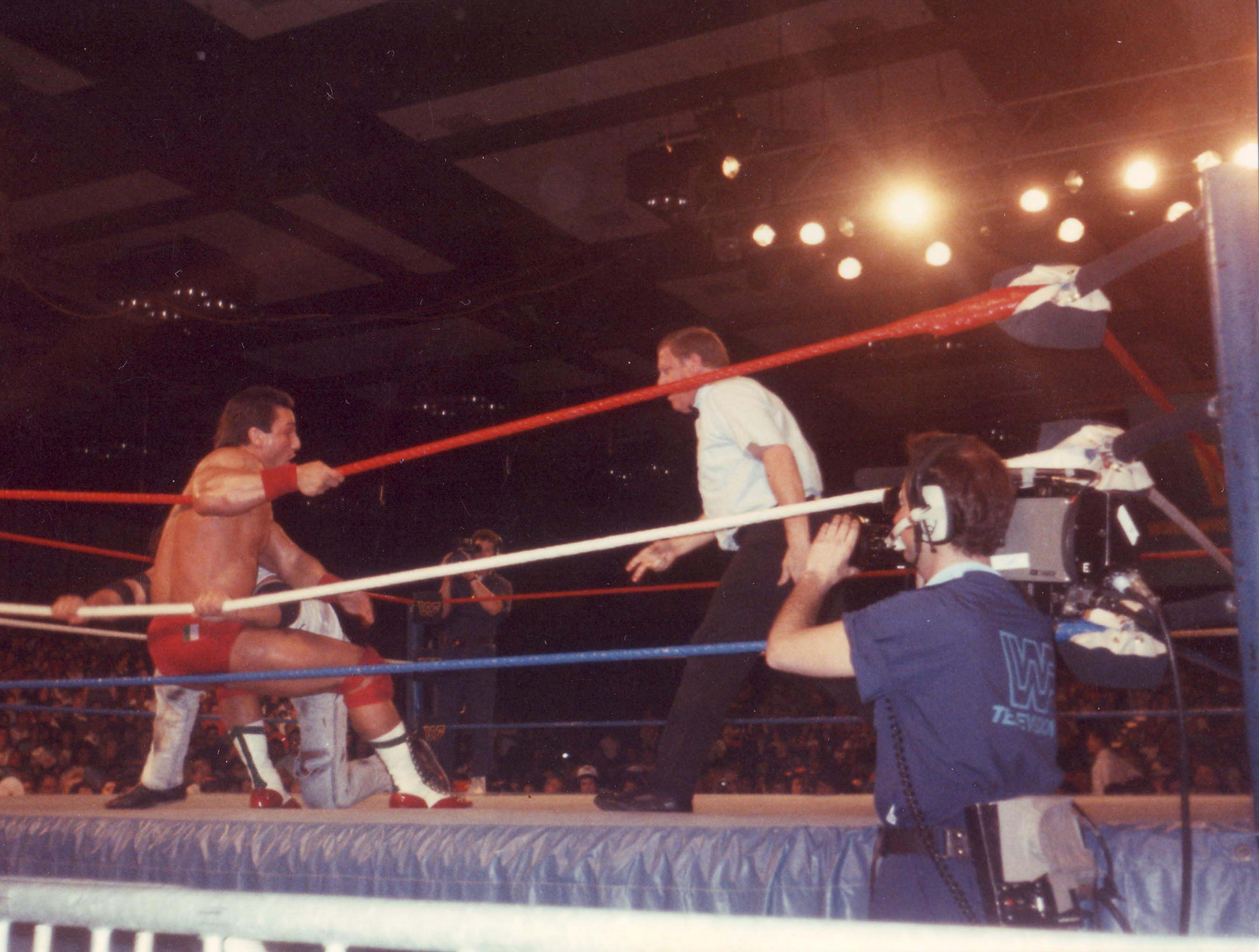
Roma (left) in a match in the late 1980s

However WWF owner Vince McMahon seemed to lose interest in the idea of pushing the team. This may have been due, in part, to the fact that Powers and Roma did not get along with each other behind the curtain. In later interviews, Roma called Powers difficult to work with. The Stallions lost house show matches to The Rougeau Brothers (Jacques and Raymond) in May, then dropped multiple encounters to The Bolsheviks the following month. Roma and Powers even lost to The Conquistadors on a house show in Warwick, Rhode Island, on July 3, and by the end of the summer had lost all momentum, losing multiple encounters to The Killer Bees. The team that had shocked the world less than a year earlier was now devoid of a push, and was fodder for the Brain Busters (Arn Anderson and Tully Blanchard) in the fall. A year after winning the inaugural Survivor Series, The Young Stallions found themselves the second team eliminated in the 1988 event.

As the Young Stallions limped into 1989 at nearly the very bottom of the tag-team ranks, Paul Roma again began to compete in singles competition. He defeated King Haku and "Ravishing" Rick Rude by disqualification on house shows in January 1989 in successive nights, and also scored multiple pinfall victories over Boris Zukhov, Barry Horowitz, and Iron Mike Sharpe. The teaming of the Young Stallions became less frequent, and after several losses to The Twin Towers (Akeem and the Big Boss Man) in January, the Stallions were not seen together until a Madison Square Garden victory on March 18 against The Conquistadors, followed by a Boston Garden victory the next night. The Stallions defeated Boris Zukhov and Barry Horowitz on June 19 and lost to The Powers of Pain (The Warlord and The Barbarian) on August 7, both times on Prime Time Wrestling. Without an official announcement or angle to end the partnership, Roma and Powers went their separate ways, competing in the singles division.

==== Singles competition (1989–1990) ====
Although successful against lower-level competition in the first half of 1989 when not competing in tag-team action, Paul Roma's momentum stalled out following the dissolution of The Young Stallions. He found himself on the losing end of multiple encounters with The Genius and The Widowmaker at house shows. Now slotted as a top-level card opener, Roma continued to win numerous matches with Boris Zukhov, Barry Horowitz, and others, but was unable to move up the card. He defeated Zukhov in a dark match at the 1989 Survivor Series, and also pinned Steve Lombardi in dark matches at both Royal Rumble and WrestleMania VI. Televised victories over Buddy Rose and Zukhov followed in the spring of 1990, although he sustained defeats to "The Model" Rick Martel, Bad News Brown and "The Million Dollar Man" Ted DiBiase.

==== Power and Glory (1990–1991) ====
It would be in tag-team action that Paul Roma would once again experience a career resurgence. On May 14, 1990, on Prime Time Wrestling Roma teamed with Hercules Hernandez for the first time, defeating Ken Johnson and Buddy Rose. At first this seemed like a one-time pairing, but played into a major storyline the following month. On June 18 on Prime Time, Hercules was defeated by Rick Martel. After the match Martel sprayed "Arrogance" into the face of Hercules, and Roma came out to make the save. On July 21 on WWF Superstars, Roma was defeated by Dino Bravo. Following the loss The Rockers (Shawn Michaels and Marty Jannetty) came out to help Roma but ended up getting into a shoving match with him instead. Hercules came to ringside and then proceeded to attack Michaels and Jannetty. Roma and Hercules then became an official heel team, Power and Glory, managed by Slick. Roma said that Hernandez did not even like him when they first met but that their partnership developed into a brother to brother type of relationship.

Following the initial pairing, Roma had an opportunity to face his former partner, Jim Powers after one year and half of their separation as team. Powers at the time, was also occasionally teaming with Jim Brunzell. Roma and Hernandez got the upper hand in the short-lived feud defeating Powers and Brunzell in a dark match, episode of Prime Time Wrestling after Roma and Hercules applied their finisher the Power-Plex to Brunzell, and ending with Roma pinning Brunzell thereafter. He also squared off against Powers in singles competition on several house shows in August 1990. The last time Roma and Powers would square against each other would be on a house show in late 1990, as Powers was teaming with Marty Jannetty as a replacement for Jannetty's original partner, Shawn Michaels, who was taking time off to heal an injury, there once again Power & Glory got the upper-hand while Powers and Jannetty were defeated. Power & Glory quickly moved into a high-profile feud with The Rockers. Power and Glory clashed with the Rockers at SummerSlam 1990 with Marty Jannetty being forced to wrestle the match on his own after Power and Glory (kayfabe) injured Shawn Michaels' knee before the match (this was a storyline excuse to give Michaels some time off to heal a previously suffered injury). Once Michaels returned, the feud continued, with the two teams being on opposite sides at Survivor Series, with Power and Glory once again coming out as the victors.

Power & Glory then challenged WWF Tag Team Champions The Hart Foundation, but never won the gold. They also challenged The Rockers during the latter's brief run as champions (which was erased from record books when the Rockers' title win over the Hart Foundation was reversed) Power & Glory's misfortune continued at WrestleMania VII where they lost to The Legion of Doom (Animal and Hawk) in under a minute. In a shoot interview, Roma admitted that the quick loss was his idea, as he was dealing with a nagging elbow injury and could barely move the arm, even wearing a large arm pad to protect it.

Roma was featured in numerous televised singles matches in the summer of 1991, including against Davey Boy Smith, Virgil, Bret Hart, and Ricky Steamboat. Power and Glory teamed up with Slick's other charge, The Warlord, for a series of 6-man tag-team matches.

Their last pay per view outing came when they teamed with The Warlord to face Ricky "The Dragon" Steamboat, "The Texas Tornado" Kerry Von Erich and Davey Boy Smith at SummerSlam 1991 in a losing effort. In one of their last recorded matches together as a team, they lost to the Legion of Doom at the Royal Albert Hall in London, England. Roma's final WWF match came later on that tour, when Power & Glory were defeated by The Rockers in Paris on October 9. Roma then left the Federation, while Hercules would remain with the company for a few months before departing as well.

According to Roma, Bret Hart told him that Power and Glory "were the best tag team he's ever seen".

=== World Championship Wrestling (1993–1995) ===
==== Four Horsemen (1993) ====
In 1993, Paul Roma signed a contract with World Championship Wrestling (WCW) and became part of the Four Horsemen alongside "Nature Boy" Ric Flair and Arn Anderson. Ric Flair had returned from WWF in early 1993 to rejoin WCW, promising a Horsemen reunion at Slamboree. Roma and Anderson teamed up and won the WCW World Tag Team Championship from "Stunning" Steve Austin and "Lord" Steven Regal (who was substituting for an injured Brian Pillman). Roma and Anderson held on to the titles for a little over a month before losing it to The Nasty Boys (Brian Knobbs and Jerry Sags).

After the 1993 WCW pay-per-view Battlebowl, Roma and Anderson faced the semi-regular team of "Mr. Wonderful" Paul Orndorff and "Stunning" Steve Austin on WCW Saturday Night, since Orndorff's alliance with Harley Race and Yoshi Kwan had failed to take them two out. During the match Roma acted very indifferent to his tag-team partner sowing the seeds for his heel turn. Next Roma teamed with Erik Watts to take on the team of Orndorff and Austin once again, this time Roma took it a step further and attacked Erik Watts before announcing that he was now teaming with Orndorff.

When WWE's video release spotlighting the Four Horsemen was released, Triple H questioned Roma's inclusion in the elite World Championship Wrestling group in 1993, and dismissively referred to him as a "job guy from WWE." Roma responded by criticizing Triple H for getting ahead by marrying Vince McMahon's daughter Stephanie.

==== Pretty Wonderful (1993–1995) ====
Under the tutelage of manager Masked Assassin the team quickly began to work well together in a feud with Marcus Alexander Bagwell and 2 Cold Scorpio. After a few months as a team they targeted the then WCW World Tag Team Champions Cactus Jack and Kevin Sullivan. Going into Bash at the Beach 1994 Pretty Wonderful had the advantage as both champions were suffering from injuries inflicted by the challengers on previous occasions (or so the storyline went). Cactus Jack and Kevin Sullivan were unable to hold off Roma and Orndorff as Pretty Wonderful left the ring with the gold. After winning the titles Pretty Wonderful was immediately challenged by the Nasty Boys but the Nasty Boys were never able to take the gold from the champions. Next Pretty Wonderful were challenged by the duo of Stars and Stripes (Marcus Alexander Bagwell & The Patriot) at Fall Brawl. The champions retained but a week later the championship changed hands when Stars and Stripes got the 1-2-3. Pretty Wonderful was granted a rematch against the new champions with a match booked for Halloween Havoc, Pretty Wonderful regained the titles when Roma dropped an elbow from the top rope on Bagwell, who had Orndorff trapped in a fisherman's suplex, but the referee's back was turned.

At Clash of the Champions XXIX, Stars and Stripes were granted a final shot at the tag-team titles, but the challengers also had to put up the Patriot's mask on the line, if they lost he would unmask. After a controversial double pin finish Stars and Stripes were declared the winners and thus the champions putting the end to Pretty Wonderful's second and final run with the gold. After the loss Roma and Orndorff went their separate ways, wrestling in singles matches.

Paul Roma was asked to help make WCW newcomer Alex Wright look good at SuperBrawl V. Roma was upset over the decision to lose the match that he went off script and dominated Wright for most of the match and no-sold any offense from Wright, yet Wright was able to score the upset win via pinfall. Roma actually had his shoulders up before three, but the referee called the match anyway as Roma was refusing to lose the match. Roma would receive a FedEx letter the next day informing him that his contract would not be renewed the following month as a result of his actions in the match with Wright. Roma continued appearing in WCW, teaming with Paul Orndorff two nights later in a losing effort against Dustin Rhodes & Johnny B Badd at a WCW Pro taping. He would lose multiple house show encounters with Alex Wright to close the month. His final match came in loss to Brian Pillman on WCW Saturday Night on March 8, 1995 (aired April 10). Roma's contract ended in March 1995 and was not renewed.

=== Later career (1995–1998) ===
In late 1995, after leaving WCW he joined the Catch Wrestling Association, winning the promotion's World Middleweight Championship by defeating Franz Schumann in October, and losing it to Fit Finlay the following month. He attempted to make a WWF comeback in December 1997 alongside a student of Mr. Fuji called Alex Roma. They wrestled only one dark match, at a Monday Night Raw taping on December 30. Roma also won a singles match at the same taping, defeating Nick Barberry. No contract was ever offered to them, and Roma retired in 1998 to focus on bodybuilding and wrestling-related business ventures.

=== Return to Wrestling (2006–2021) ===
In 2006, Roma resurfaced on the wrestling scene as he was named the commissioner of the now-defunct independent promotion, Connecticut Championship Wrestling. He also had a "Pretty Wonderful" reunion with Paul Orndorff in Connecticut Championship Wrestling. Roma has also been competing in the IAW (Independent Association of Wrestling) wrestling promotion. Roma won the IAW Heavyweight Championship, after beating Brian Costello (aka The Crippler), on July 8, 2006, at IAW Clash at the Cove VIII, in South Bend, IN. He eventually lost the title to The Crippler on March 24, 2007, at IAW Clash at the CAVE II (held in the gym of Mishawaka High School in Mishawaka, Indiana) after receiving a piledriver onto a chair, behind the back of special referee Brandon Trtan, who was attacked and knocked out of the ring by Roma.

In 2015, Roma returned to the ring working for the Connecticut promotion Paradise Alley Pro Wrestling. On November 21, he defeated Lukas Sharp to become the inaugural PAPW Heavyweight Champion. He vacated the title in 2016. On April 21, 2018, Roma defeated Ty Shyne in his last PAPW appearance.

In 2019, he defeated Vladimir Moskayev at an event held by the Empire Wrestling Federation (EWF) on July 12 in San Bernardino, California. Two years later, on December 11, 2021, Roma lost to Vladimir Moskayev at EWF event.

== Boxing career ==
After leaving the World Wrestling Federation in 1991, Roma turned to pro boxing, competing under Paul Roma since it was the name that he thought had the most recognition factor. He had a sum total of three professional boxing matches. In his debut match on March 6, 1992, Roma lost via TKO in the fourth round to a fighter named Jerry Arentzen, when his trainer threw in the towel. The victory was one of Arentzen's two wins in 22 matches. On April 1, 1992, he defeated Norman Fortini and then on May 5, 1992, he fought and defeated Norman Shrink, this was both Fortini's and Shrink's only professional boxing match ever. After the third fight Roma stopped boxing and returned to professional wrestling working for WCW.

== Television ==
In the late 1980s, Roma appeared on the Australian television game show Perfect Match, a show based on the format of The Dating Game.

== Current activities ==
Roma (alongside fellow wrestlers Mario Mancini, Paul Perez, and Dave Paradise) runs a wrestling training school in East Haven, Connecticut. In 2020, Roma's school received a cease and desist letter from East Haven Connecticut that the school violated zoning laws. Roma said in a 2013 shoot interview he regularly visits and speaks to children in St. Jude's Hospital.

Roma's nephew is IFBB professional bodybuilder Evan Centopani.

== Championships and accomplishments ==
- Catch Wrestling Association
  - CWA World Middleweight Championship (1 time)
- Independent Association of Wrestling
  - IAW Heavyweight Championship (3 times)
  - IAW Tag Team Championship (3 times) - with Repo Man (1), Hercules (1), and Alex Roma (1)
- Paradise Alley Pro Wrestling
  - PAPW Heavyweight Championship (1 time)
- Pro Wrestling Illustrated
  - PWI Most Improved Wrestler of the Year (1990)
  - Ranked No. 92 of the top 500 singles wrestlers in the PWI 500 in 1994
- World Championship Wrestling
  - NWA World Tag Team Championship (1 time) - with Arn Anderson
  - WCW World Tag Team Championship (3 times) - with Arn Anderson (1) and Paul Orndorff (2)
