= The Nasty Boys =

Professional wrestling tag team

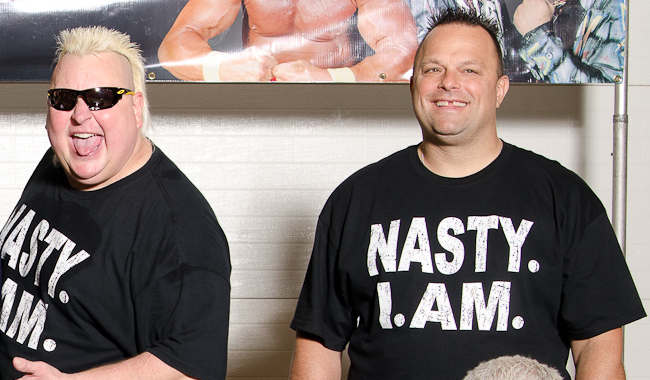
- The Nasty Boys, Brian Knobbs (left) and Jerry Sags (right), in 2011

Tag team
- Members: Brian Knobbs; Jerry Sags
- Name: The Nasty Boys
- Billed heights: 6 ft 1 in (1.85 m) (Knobbs); 6 ft 3 in (1.91 m) (Sags)
- Combined billed weight: 585 lb (265 kg)
- Hometown: Whitehall Township, Pennsylvania, U.S.
- Billed from: "Nastyville"; Allentown, Pennsylvania (WWF) "The Streets of New York City" (WCW)
- Debut: 1986
- Disbanded: April 20, 2019 (last match)
- Trained by: Verne Gagne; Brad Rheingans

The Nasty Boys were a professional wrestling tag team consisting of Brian Knobbs and Jerry Sags. The team were active from the mid-1980s through the 1990s. Their gimmick was that of anti-social punks who specialized in hardcore wrestling and brawling. They were noted for their distinctive all-black "street look", which, while very commonplace among today's wrestlers, was vastly different from the colorful attire of their wrestling peers of the late 1980s and early 1990s. This included graffiti-sprayed T-shirts, chain-adorned leather trenchcoats, and their distinctive mullet-hawk haircuts.

== Career ==
=== American Wrestling Association and Florida Championship Wrestling (1986–1990) ===
Jerry "Biff" Sags and Brian "Buff" Knobbs were childhood friends growing up in Whitehall Township, Pennsylvania. They both attended Whitehall High School in the Lehigh Valley region of eastern Pennsylvania. While most professional wrestling tag teams were and still are matched by bookers, Sags and Knobbs friendship led them to form The Nasty Boys without any such professional booking guidance or input.

The Nasty Boys began their career in the American Wrestling Association in 1985 and began teaming together as The Nasty Boyz in 1986. They began moving up the cards while in Memphis, Tennessee, as a heel team against The Rockers, a face team. In 1988, they moved to Florida Championship Wrestling, where they won five tag team championships between 1989 and 1990. While they were in Memphis, Jerry Lawler suggested they change their look to spandex gold tights and long boots. Sags and Knobbs also decided to cover their bodies and paint their faces, though they dropped the face paint when wrestling outside of Memphis.

=== World Championship Wrestling (1990) ===
In 1990, the Nasty Boys joined World Championship Wrestling (WCW). They initially feuded with the Steiner Brothers but were unable to defeat them for the United States Tag Team Championship. In December 1990, they left WCW and joined the WWE (then known as the WWF).

=== World Wrestling Federation (1990–1993) ===
They debuted on the December 29, 1990, episode of Superstars of Wrestling. Along with their manager Jimmy Hart, The Nasty Boys quickly announced their intention to "Nastisize the WWF". They became number one contenders after winning a seven team battle royal on February 16, 1991, that aired on WWF Superstars. On March 24, 1991, they defeated The Hart Foundation at WrestleMania VII in Los Angeles to win the WWF World Tag Team Championship.

The Nasty Boys held the title until SummerSlam 1991 at Madison Square Garden on August 26, 1991, where they were defeated by Legion of Doom in a no disqualification, no count out match. They then feuded with The Rockers and The Bushwhackers, leading to an elimination match at Survivor Series '91 in Detroit, where they teamed with The Beverly Brothers to defeat both teams. In late 1991 into early 1992, The Nasty Boys feuded with Hacksaw Jim Duggan and Sgt. Slaughter that culminated in an eight-man tag team match at WrestleMania VIII in Indianapolis, where Duggan, Slaughter, Big Boss Man, and Virgil defeated The Nasty Boys, The Mountie, and Repo Man. That fall, they turned face and dumped Jimmy Hart as their manager after Hart overlooked them for a tag team title match against The Natural Disasters, instead giving the title shot to Money Inc. Knobbs and Sags teamed with The Natural Disasters to defeat Money Inc. and The Beverly Brothers in an elimination match at Survivor Series '92 in Richfield Township, Ohio. The Nasty Boys continued feuding with Money Inc. but were unable to regain the title.

On the March 13, 1993, edition of WWF Superstars, The Nasty Boys agreed to step aside and allow Hulk Hogan and Brutus Beefcake to have a one-time title shot against Money Inc. at WrestleMania IX at Caesars Palace in Las Vegas. They then entered a house show series against The Headshrinkers and wrestled to double disqualifications on several occasions. Their feud spilled onto WWF television and into the European Rampage tour, and they wrestled once more to a double disqualification against Fatu and Samu on the Italian version of WWF Superstars, in which both teams hit each other with wooden chairs in a post-match brawl. In April 1993, after the European tour, The Nasty Boys were suspended and then fired from the company. Their final television appearance came on May 16, 1993, when they defeated jobbers Steve Vega and Barry Horowitz on WWF Wrestling Challenge.

=== Return to WCW (1993–1997) ===
The Nasty Boys returned to WCW in July 1993 as heels managed by Missy Hyatt. They defeated Arn Anderson and Paul Roma at Fall Brawl 1993 in Houston to become WCW World Tag Team Champions. They then lost the championship on October 4 to Marcus Alexander Bagwell and 2 Cold Scorpio before regaining it on October 24. In February 1994, they parted ways with Missy Hyatt (who in reality was fired from WCW over a dispute with Eric Bischoff) and they started Cactus Jack and Maxx Payne in a series of wild brawls. They were supposed to feud with Kevin Sullivan and his (kayfabe) dyslexic brother Dave, who called himself Evad ("Dave" backwards). Evad, however, injured his knee, and Sullivan convinced Cactus Jack to team with him. The Nasty Boys lost the title to the thrown together team of Jack and Sullivan in a wild street fight at Slamboree 1994 in Philadelphia.

Shortly after Slamboree, The Nasty Boys quietly turned face and Knobbs and Sags went on to feud with tag teams such as Harlem Heat and The Blue Bloods. At Slamboree 1995 in St. Petersburg, Florida, they defeated Harlem Heat to become three-time WCW tag team champions but lost the title to them soon after. In October 1996, Knobbs and Sags attempted to join the New World Order by wearing their shirts to garner attention from the group, but were attacked them as soon as they were "accepted" into the fold. In a subsequent match against Scott Hall and Kevin Nash, Sags became enraged during the contest after being struck on the head. Thinking Hall had struck him with a chair, Sags retaliated by punching him and knocking his tooth out. After the match Sags filed a lawsuit, but he later saw footage realizing it was Nash that had hit him with a tag belt. Both Nasty Boys were released from WCW in February 1997, however Brian Knobbs would return to WCW as a singles wrestler in April 1999.

=== Independent circuit (2001-2019) ===
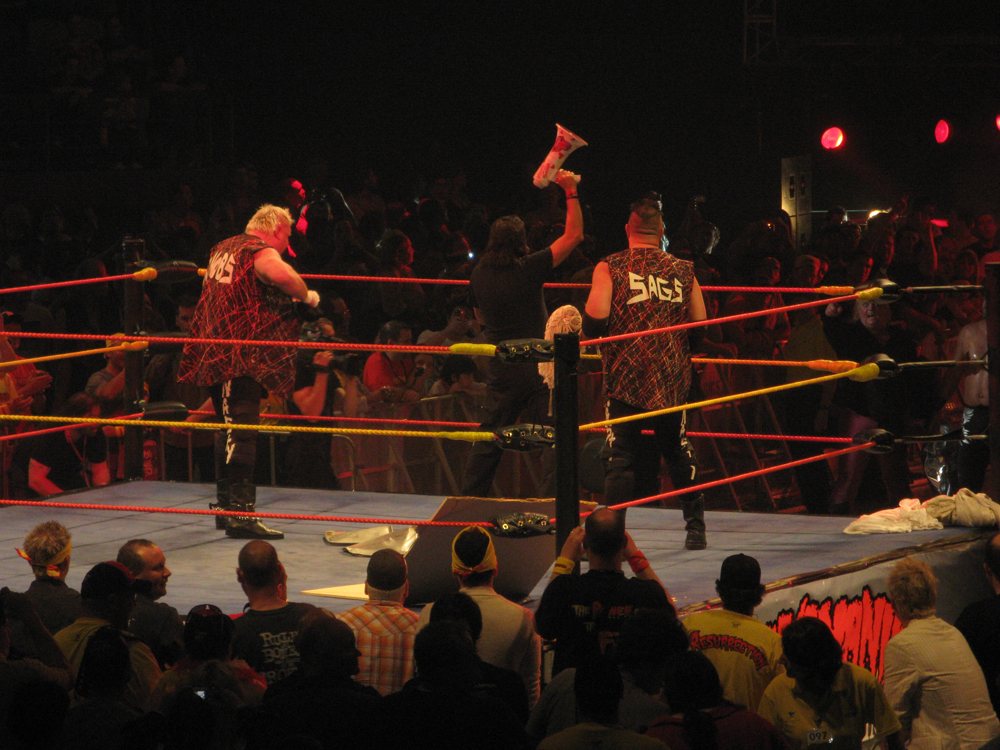
The Nasty Boys during the Hulkamania Tour in Melbourne, Australia, 2009

The Nasty Boys reunited in the Southeast Wrestling Alliance on May 6, 2001, where they defeated Death & Destruction (Frank Parker and Roger Anderson). They were also active in the short-lived XWF and the World Wrestling Council in Puerto Rico.

On November 21, 2009, they were involved with Hulkamania's Australian tour in Melbourne, Australia, where they wrestled and defeated Reno Anoaʻi and Vampire Warrior in an Australian street fight. In March and April 2012 they feuded with AJ Mitrano and Mr. TA for Big Time Wrestling in Massachusetts.

The Nasty Boys have both appeared on Hogan Knows Best and in WWE magazine's "Where are they now?" section.

=== Return to WWE (2007) ===
On November 20, 2007, Brian Knobbs and Jerry Sags made a brief return to the WWE as The Nasty Boys at WWE SmackDown in Tampa, Florida, participating in their first WWE match in 14 years. They defeated Dave Taylor and Drew McIntyre, but were subsequently released the following day. On August 26, 2024 the WWE posted this match on YouTube through their WWE Vault channel.

=== Total Nonstop Action Wrestling (2010) ===
On January 4, 2010, The Nasty Boys made their debut appearance on Total Nonstop Action Wrestling's television show, TNA Impact!, where they trashed Team 3D's locker room during their absence from the show while in Japan. This initiated a feud, with both teams exchanging physical onslaughts with one another. on the January 14 episode of Impact!, Team 3D returned, but were attacked by The Nasty Boys. On the January 21 episode of Impact!, The Nasty Boys competed in their first match for TNA, defeating Eric Young and Kevin Nash. On the January 28 episode of Impact!, The Nasty Boys and Team 3D got into an intense confrontation as they hyped their upcoming match. On the February 4 episode of Impact!, The Nasty Boys attacked Team 3D following a match until Hernandez and Matt Morgan ended the confrontation.

At Against All Odds in Orlando, Florida, The Nasty Boys defeated Team 3D in a tag team match when Jimmy Hart made his return and interfered in the match on The Nasty Boys' behalf. On the February 25 edition of Impact!, Team 3D defeated the Nasty Boys in a tables match when Jesse Neal interfered on Team 3D's behalf. The Nasty Boys and Hart continued their feud with Team 3D on the March 15 episode of Impact!, defeating them and returning Brother Runt, who served as a replacement for Jesse Neal, who The Nastys attacked prior to the match in a six-man tag team match. After the match, Neal attacked The Nastys and helped Team 3D throw Sags through a table.

On March 29, 2010, The Nasty Boys were released by TNA.

=== Retirement and aftermath ===
Their last match together was on April 20, 2019, teaming with Jacob Fatu as they defeated Leo Brien, Mike Patrick and Drew Sipilia for Legends Of Wrestling in Fraser, Michigan.

In 2019, Knobbs was hospitalized with a blood infection and had surgery on one of his knees. This forced him to retire from wrestling. Since then he's had other health issues.

== Reputation ==
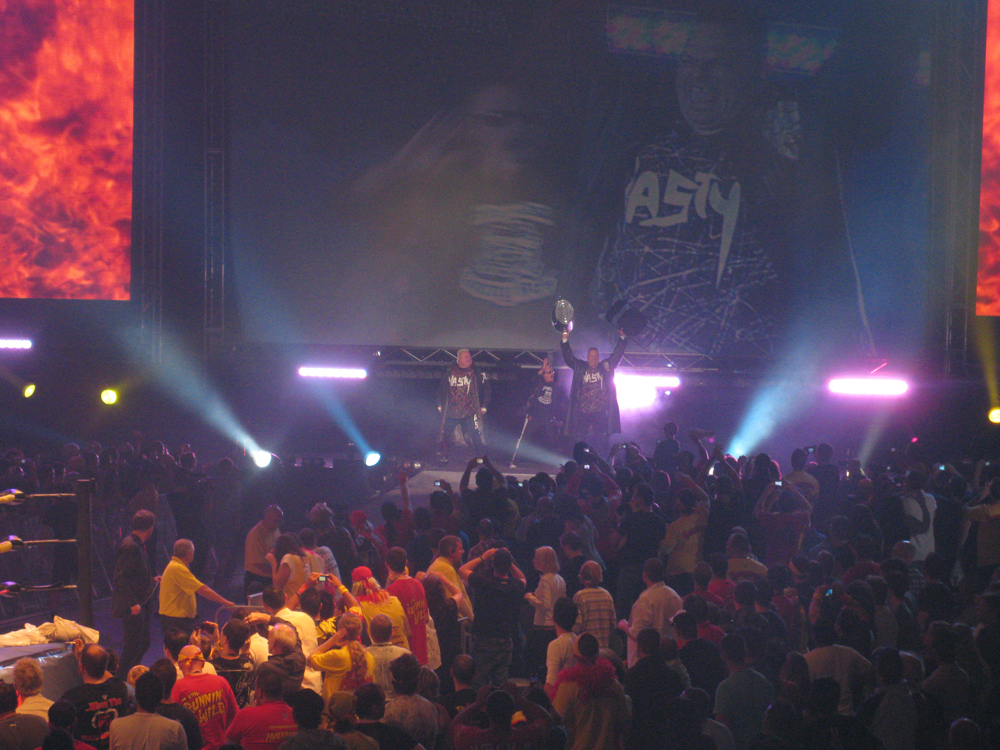
The Nasty Boys' entrance at Hulkamania, 2009

The Nasty Boys have a reputation of being very stiff with their opponents. They have also been involved in ribbing (pranking backstage) other wrestlers and have engaged in several legitimate fights.

== Championships and accomplishments ==
- American Wrestling Association
  - AWA Southern Tag Team Championship (2 times)
- Cauliflower Alley Club
  - Tag Team Award (2023)
- Florida Championship Wrestling
  - FCW Tag Team Championship (5 times)
- Championship Wrestling International
  - CWI Tag Team Championship (1 time)
- North American Wrestling Association / South Atlantic Pro Wrestling
  - NAWA/SAPW Tag Team Championship (1 time)
- Pro Wrestling Illustrated
  - PWI Tag Team of the Year award in 1994
  - PWI ranked them # 53 of the best tag teams of the "PWI Years" in 2003.
- Professional Wrestling Federation
  - PWF Tag Team Championship (1 time)
- World Championship Wrestling
  - WCW World Tag Team Championship (3 times)
- World Wrestling Federation
  - WWF World Tag Team Championship (1 time)
- X Wrestling Federation
  - XWF World Tag Team Championship (1 time)
- Wrestling Observer Newsletter
  - Best Gimmick (1996) – nWo
  - Feud of the Year (1996) New World Order vs. World Championship Wrestling
