= Starrcade '92: Battlebowl – The Lethal Lottery II =

1992 World Championship Wrestling pay-per-view event

- Official cover of the VHS tape, featuring Sting (left), Rick Rude (center), and Ron Simmons (right)
- Promotion: World Championship Wrestling
- Date: December 28, 1992
- City: Atlanta, Georgia
- Venue: The Omni
- Attendance: 8,000
- Buy rate: 95,000
- Tagline(s): The Ultimate Challenge Of Skill, Luck, and Survival; Only One Man Can Survive

Pay-per-view chronology
← Previous; Halloween Havoc	Next → WCW/New Japan Supershow III

Starrcade chronology
← Previous; 1991	Next → 1993

Starrcade '92: Battlebowl – The Lethal Lottery II was the 10th annual Starrcade professional wrestling pay-per-view (PPV) event produced by World Championship Wrestling (WCW). It was broadcast December 28, 1992, from The Omni in Atlanta, Georgia.

The show's focus was the second-ever "Lethal Lottery" / "Battle Bowl" tournament, where randomly paired tag teams competed for a spot in the Battle Bowl battle royal at the end of the night. Unlike the previous Starrcade, it was only a 16-man tournament with 8 finalists in a single ring battle royal. It also saw Ron Simmons defend the WCW World Heavyweight Championship against "Dr. Death" Steve Williams; the team of Shane Douglas and Ricky Steamboat putting the WCW World Tag Team Championship on the line against the team of Brian Pillman and Barry Windham; and Masahiro Chono defend the NWA World Heavyweight Championship against The Great Muta. In addition, Sting faced off against Big Van Vader in the finals of the "King of Cable" tournament.

It was the last WCW Pay-Per-View for announcer Jim Ross, who left for the World Wrestling Federation (now WWE) shortly thereafter.

This was also the last Starrcade featuring championships from the National Wrestling Alliance, WCW would leave the NWA for good in September, 1993.

In 2001, WCW, including all rights to their television and pay-per-view shows, was bought by WWE.

== Storylines ==
The event featured wrestlers from pre-existing scripted feuds and storylines. The first match of the "Lethal Lottery" was drawn at random as part of the Clash of the Champions XXI show on November 18, 1992, which paired up Johnny B. Badd and Cactus Jack to face the team of Van Hammer and Danny Spivey, who won as part of the Starrcade show. Sting won the first BattleBowl at the 1991 Starrcade and thus was guaranteed to be one of the 16 wrestlers in the tournament.

== Event ==
Other on-screen personnel
Role:	Name:
Commentator	Jim Ross
Commentator	Jesse Ventura
Interviewer	Tony Schiavone
Battlebowl Commissioner	Larry Zbyszko
Ring announcer	Gary Michael Cappetta

Ron Simmons was originally scheduled to defend the WCW World Heavyweight Championship against Rick Rude, but Rude was injured in the weeks prior to the show and had to be replaced by "Dr. Death" Steve Williams instead. The "King of Cable" tournament was an eight-man tournament conducted to celebrate the 20th anniversary of wrestling airing on TBS Superstation.

== Reception ==
J.D. Dunn of 411Mania gave the event a rating of 5.0 [Not So Good], stating, "Bill Watts got fired almost immediately following this show, and Verne Gagne's coffee boy Eric Bischoff would take over and surprisingly not get fired himself after a dismal 1993. I appreciate that Watts tried to bring back realism and sportsmanship to WCW, but he booked to his tastes and not the audience when it came to who to push, and that came back to bite him. The show, like a lot of early 1990s WCW shows, had a hebetudinous pace and deathly atmosphere. The two matches worth seeing are on the Essential Starrcade, so no need to pick this one up. Thumbs down."

== Aftermath ==
Ron Simmons would lose the WCW World Heavyweight Championship two days later back to Big Van Vader in Baltimore, MD, on the same site Simmons had defeated Vader on August 2.

Rick Rude appeared at the event distraught over being unable to challenge for the WCW World title and even more upset over WCW’s decision to strip him of the WCW United States Championship if he failed to defend by January 23, 1993. A tournament that was to begin the following month to determine a number one contender would eventually become a tournament final to determine a new champion, won by Dustin Rhodes. When Rude returned he would feud with Rhodes over the title. Rude’s next shot at a World title came at Fall Brawl '93: War Games, where he defeated Ric Flair to win the WCW International World Heavyweight Championship.

== Home Video and Streaming ==
The event was released on home video in the United States and the United Kingdom by Turner Home Entertainment. In the UK, it was released in the autumn of 1993 and was among the first WCW home videos not to be heavily cut from the original broadcast.

On the launch of the WWE Network in 2014, the event was among the WCW pay-per-views included on the streaming platform. In December 2025, the WWE uploaded the event in full to their WCW YouTube channel for free streaming.

== Results ==
No.	Results	Stipulations	Times
1^{D}	Brad Armstrong defeated Shanghai Pierce	Singles match	07:30
2	Van Hammer and Danny Spivey defeated Johnny B. Badd and Cactus Jack	Lethal Lottery tag team match	06:51
3	Big Van Vader and Dustin Rhodes defeated Kensuke Sasaki and The Barbarian	Lethal Lottery tag team match	06:56
4	The Great Muta and Barry Windham defeated Brian Pillman and 2 Cold Scorpio	Lethal Lottery tag team match	06:59
5	Steve Williams and Sting defeated Jushin Thunder Liger and Erik Watts	Lethal Lottery tag team match	09:08
6	Masahiro Chono (c) defeated The Great Muta by submission	Singles match for the NWA World Heavyweight Championship	12:49
7	Ron Simmons (c) defeated Steve Williams by disqualification	Singles match for the WCW World Heavyweight Championship	15:12
8	Shane Douglas and Ricky Steamboat (c) defeated Barry Windham and Brian Pillman	Tag team match for the NWA and WCW World Tag Team Championships	20:02
9	Sting defeated Big Van Vader (with Harley Race)	King of Cable tournament final	16:50
10	The Great Muta won by last eliminating Barry Windham	BattleBowl II	14:01
(c) / – the champion(s) heading into the match; D / – this was a dark match

^1Other competitors were Big Van Vader, Dustin Rhodes, Van Hammer, Danny Spivey, Sting, Steve Williams and Barry Windham

=== King of Cable Tournament brackets ===
Quarterfinals
Big Van Vader
Tony Atlas
Dustin Rhodes
The Barbarian
Rick Rude
Barry Windham
Sting
Brian Pillman

Semifinals
Big Van Vader
Dustin Rhodes
Rick Rude
Sting

Final
Big Van Vader
Sting
