= Halloween Havoc (1993) =

World Championship Wrestling pay-per-view event

- VHS cover featuring Vader and Cactus Jack
- Promotion: World Championship Wrestling
- Date: October 24, 1993
- City: New Orleans, Louisiana
- Venue: Lakefront Arena
- Attendance: 6,000
- Buy rate: 100,000
- Tagline: Spin the Wheel, Make the Deal

Pay-per-view chronology
| ← Previous; Fall Brawl | Next → Battlebowl |

Halloween Havoc chronology
| ← Previous; 1992 | Next → 1994 |

The 1993 Halloween Havoc was the fifth annual Halloween Havoc professional wrestling pay-per-view (PPV) event produced by World Championship Wrestling (WCW). It took place on October 24, 1993, from the Lakefront Arena in New Orleans, Louisiana.

Eight matches were contested at the event. In the main event, Vader defeated Cactus Jack in a Texas Death match. In other prominent matches, Rick Rude defeated Ric Flair by disqualification to retain the WCW International World Heavyweight Championship, and The Nasty Boys (Brian Knobbs and Jerry Sags) defeated Marcus Alexander Bagwell and 2 Cold Scorpio to win the WCW World Tag Team Championship.

== Production ==
=== Background ===
Halloween Havoc was an annual professional wrestling pay-per-view event produced by World Championship Wrestling (WCW) since 1989. As the name implies, it was a Halloween-themed show held in October. The 1993 event was the fifth event in the Halloween Havoc chronology and it took place on October 24, 1993, from the Lakefront Arena in New Orleans, Louisiana.

=== Storylines ===
The event featured professional wrestling matches that involve different wrestlers from pre-existing scripted feuds and storylines. Professional wrestlers portray villains, heroes, or less distinguishable characters in the scripted events that build tension and culminate in a wrestling match or series of matches.

== Event ==
Other on-screen personnel
| Role: | Name: |
|---|---|
| Play-by-play | Tony Schiavone |
| Color Commentator | Jesse Ventura |
| Interviewer | Eric Bischoff |
| Ring announcers | Gary Michael Cappetta |
| Ring announcers | Michael Buffer |
| Referees | Randy Anderson |
| Referees | Nick Patrick |
| Referees | Terry Taylor (Match 7 only) |

In the opening match of the pay-per-view, Ice Train, Charlie Norris and The Shockmaster defeated Harlem Heat (Kole and Kane) and The Equalizer, after the Shockmaster powerslammed Kole.

Paul Orndorff replaced the injured Yoshi Kwan in the second match, against Ricky Steamboat. The Assassin, who came out with Orndorff, put something into his mask and headbutted Steamboat. Steamboat was unable to get up from this and ultimately lost via countout.

In the next match, Lord Steven Regal was defending his WCW World Television Championship against Davey Boy Smith. Regal was able to retain his title after the match ended at a time limit draw, after 15 minutes.

The next match, for the WCW United States Heavyweight Championship, Steve Austin originally thought he defeated Dustin Rhodes, however his feet were on the rope. While Austin was looking for the title, Rhodes was able to roll up Austin and record the pinfall victory. Following the match Austin attacked Rhodes with the belt.

The Nasty Boys (Brian Knobbs and Jerry Sags) next won the WCW World Tag Team Championship from Marcus Alexander Bagwell and 2 Cold Scorpio. Scorpio hit the 450 splash on Knobbs, however he then got attacked by Sags, enabling Knobbs to pin Scorpio.

Next, Sting was able to roll up Sid Vicious to pick up the victory.

The second to last match was for the WCW International World Heavyweight Championship. The champion, Rick Rude was able to successfully retain the title against Ric Flair via disqualification. Flair utilized a foreign object on Rude, and as guest referee Terry Taylor began to count the cover by Flair, referee Randy Anderson stopped the match and disqualified Flair.

The main event Big Van Vader faced Cactus Jack in a "Spin the Wheel, Make the Deal" match; the match type was determined by Vader spinning a wheel of fortune earlier in the evening. The selected match was a Texas death match, in which a wrestler unable to stand up during a ten-count, following a pinfall, would lose the match. Although Vader held the WCW World Heavyweight Championship, this was a non-title match. Cactus Jack scored the first and second fall, after clotheslining Vader on the ramp and hitting Vader with an elbow drop on the floor, but Vader managed to get to his feet. After a moonsault, Vader pinned Jack, who also managed to rise again. A DDT onto a chair allowed Vader to pin Jack another time. As Jack attempted to get to his feet, Harley Race attacked Jack with a stun gun while the referee's back was turned, enabling Vader to get the win.

== Results ==
| No. | Results | Stipulations | Times |
|---|---|---|---|
| 1 | Ice Train, Charlie Norris and The Shockmaster defeated Harlem Heat (Kole and Kane) and The Equalizer | Six-man tag team match | 9:45 |
| 2 | Paul Orndorff (with The Assassin) defeated Ricky Steamboat by countout | Singles match | 18:35 |
| 3 | Lord Steven Regal (c) (with Sir William) vs. Davey Boy Smith ended in a time limit draw | Singles match for the WCW World Television Championship | 15:00 |
| 4 | Dustin Rhodes (c) defeated Steve Austin | Singles match for the WCW United States Heavyweight Championship | 14:23 |
| 5 | The Nasty Boys (Brian Knobbs and Jerry Sags) (with Missy Hyatt) defeated Marcus Alexander Bagwell and 2 Cold Scorpio (c) (with Teddy Long) | Tag team match for the WCW World Tag Team Championship | 14:38 |
| 6 | Sting defeated Sid Vicious | Singles match | 10:41 |
| 7 | Rick Rude (c) defeated Ric Flair by disqualification | Singles match for the WCW International World Heavyweight Championship | 19:22 |
| 8 | Vader (with Harley Race) defeated Cactus Jack | Texas Death match | 15:59 |
(c) / – the champion(s) heading into the match
