= Starrcade '93: 10th Anniversary =

1993 World Championship Wrestling pay-per-view event

- Promotional Poster Featuring Big Van Vader and Ric Flair
- Promotion: World Championship Wrestling
- Date: December 27, 1993
- City: Charlotte, North Carolina
- Venue: Independence Arena
- Attendance: 8,200
- Buy rate: 115,000
- Tagline: Vader's Belt...Flair's Career. It's All On The Line!

Pay-per-view chronology
← Previous; Battlebowl	Next → SuperBrawl IV

Starrcade chronology
← Previous; 1992	Next → 1994

Starrcade '93: 10th Anniversary was the 11th annual Starrcade professional wrestling pay-per-view (PPV) event produced by World Championship Wrestling. It took place on December 27, 1993, from the Independence Arena in Charlotte, North Carolina. This was the first Starrcade to feature Ric Flair since the Starrcade in 1990.

The main event was between Big Van Vader and Ric Flair for the WCW World Heavyweight Championship, booked as a result of the double stabbing that occurred between Arn Anderson and Sid Vicious in October. Flair replaced Vicious in his match against Vader. Their feud continued after the event with a Thundercage match at SuperBrawl IV. The event also included The Nasty Boys against Sting and Road Warrior Hawk for the WCW World Tag Team Championship, Rick Rude against The Boss (replacing Davey Boy Smith) for the WCW International World Heavyweight Championship, and a two out of three falls match between Dustin Rhodes and Steve Austin for the WCW United States Heavyweight Championship.

== Storylines ==
The event featured wrestlers from pre-existing scripted feuds and storylines.

The main feud heading into Starrcade was between Ric Flair and Big Van Vader over the WCW World Heavyweight Championship. After leaving WCW in 1991, Ric Flair returned in early 1993, winning the NWA World Heavyweight Championship on July 18 at Beach Blast for the eighth time in a match with Barry Windham. The title became the WCW International World Heavyweight Championship in September after WCW left the National Wrestling Alliance. Flair then lost the title to Rick Rude at Fall Brawl.

After defeating Ron Simmons for the WCW World Heavyweight Championship on December 30, 1992, Big Van Vader held the championship all year up to Starrcade (save for a six-day run by Sting in March 1993). Vader feuded with Davey Boy Smith in May over the title. The feud also involved Sid Vicious and Sting, who formed an alliance with Vader and Smith respectively. Vader then had a short feud with Cactus Jack before being chosen to face Vicious at Starrcade. On October 28, Arn Anderson and Vicious had a fight at a hotel that resulted in a double stabbing. The incident led to Vicious being fired, and Flair challenging Vader to a title match at Starrcade, with Flair also putting his career on the line.

== Event ==
Big Van Vader, the WCW World Heavyweight Champion, before his match at Starrcade

The first match was between Pretty Wonderful (Paul Orndorff and Paul Roma) (accompanied by The Assassin) and the team of 2 Cold Scorpio and Marcus Bagwell. The match started with Scorpio and Bagwell having the advantage, and targeting the left arm of Orndorff and Roma. Pretty Wonderful dominated Bagwell after Roma attacked him from behind. After Roma missed a splash, Scorpio and Orndorff tagged in. Scorpio had the advantage, and performed a headscissors takedown. The Assassin then climbed onto the apron, and placed a disc in his mask. As Scorpio attempted another headscissors takedown, The Assassin performed a headbutt to Scorpio, and Orndorff pinned him to win the match.

The second match was between Awesome Kong (accompanied by King Kong) and The Shockmaster. Before the match, Awesome and King Kong attacked The Shockmaster. The match started with King Kong competing instead. The Shockmaster blocked a body avalanche, and performed a clothesline and a crossbody block. The Shockmaster then pinned King Kong after a scoop slam to win the match.

Other on-screen personnel
Role:	Name:
Commentator	Tony Schiavone
Commentator	Jesse Ventura
Interviewer	Eric Bischoff
Interviewer	Gene Okerlund
Referee	Randy Anderson
Referee	Nick Patrick
Ring announcer	Michael Buffer
Ring announcer	Gary Michael Cappetta

The third match was between Ricky Steamboat and Lord Steven Regal (accompanied by Sir William) for the WCW World Television Championship. The match started back and forth until Steamboat gained the advantage with an enzuigiri. Regal fought back after a dropkick following the distraction by William. Steamboat reversed the butterfly into a double underhook suplex, and attacked Regal outside the ring. As Steamboat performed a bridging German suplex, the time limit expired, and Regal retained the title.

The fourth match was between the team of Tex Slazenger and Shanghai Pierce and the team of Cactus Jack and Maxx Payne. The match started back and forth until Jack delivered punches to Slazenger, and Jack and Payne had the advantage. Jack performed a Cactus clothesline to Pierce and an aided suicide senton to Slazenger. Slazenger and Pierce attempted to double-team Payne, but Payne performed a clothesline to both. Jack tagged in, and Pierce accidentally performed a clothesline on Slazenger. Jack then pinned Pierce after a double arm DDT to win the match.

The fifth match was a two out of three falls match between Steve Austin (accompanied by Col. Robert Parker) and Dustin Rhodes for the WCW United States Heavyweight Championship. They went back and forth for most of the match. After Austin missed an axe handle elbow drop, Rhodes performed a clothesline and a scoop powerslam. Parker climbed onto the apron, and Rhodes sent Austin into him. Austin fell over the top rope outside the ring, and Rhodes lost the first fall via disqualification. Rhodes continued to attack Austin, and performed mounted punches. Austin pulled him down, and pinned Rhodes with a roll-up while pulling his tights to win the match and the title. This match was notable for the lights in the arena going out briefly during the second fall, shortly before the finish.

The sixth match was between The Boss and Rick Rude for the WCW International World Heavyweight Championship. The match started with Rude attacking The Boss until The Boss performed a back body drop and a big boot. The Boss attacked Rude outside, and applied the bear hug. After several punches, The Boss attempted a leapfrog body guillotine. Rude avoided it, and pinned The Boss with a sunset flip to win the match, and retain the title.

The seventh match was between The Nasty Boys (Brian Knobbs and Jerry Sags) (accompanied by Missy Hyatt) and the team of Sting and Road Warrior Hawk for the WCW World Tag Team Championship. Sting and Hawk had the early advantage, and targeted the left arm of Knobs. After Hawk missed a turnbuckle thrust in the corner, he fell outside, and was attacked by The Nasty Boys. They had the advantage until Hawk performed a clothesline to both, and tagged in Sting. Sting attacked them both, and attempted a splash to Knobs, but Knobs raised his knees. The Nasty Boys then dominated Sting, and repeatedly applied the abdominal stretch. This continued until Hawk came in, and attacked both with Sting. They performed a Doomsday Device on Knobs, and Sting attempted to pin him, but Hyatt interfered. Sting and Hawk won the match by disqualification, and The Nasty Boys retained the title.

Ric Flair won the WCW World Heavyweight Championship at Starrcade.

The main event was between Big Van Vader (accompanied by Harley Race) and Ric Flair for the WCW World Heavyweight Championship. Flair would have to retire from professional wrestling if he lost. The match started with Vader having the advantage with attacks. After Vader performed a gorilla press slam, Flair rolled outside the ring, and Vader performed a gorilla press drop onto the guard rail. Vader then missed an attack, and ran into the guard rail. Flair fought back, and sent Vader into the ringpost. Race then attacked Flair, and Vader regained the advantage. Vader dominated Flair, performing a superplex and a body avalanche. Flair fought back, and sent Vader's left leg into the ringpost. Flair attacked the leg with a chair, and continued to target the leg. After Vader missed a corner slingshot splash, Flair applied the figure four leglock. Vader reached the ropes, and fought back, but missed a moonsault. Flair attempted to pin Vader while Race climbed the turnbuckle Vader jumped from. Race attempted a diving headbutt to break up the pin, but Vader powered Flair off of him to kick out just as Race jumped and as a result the champion took the diving headbutt from his manager. After referee Randy Anderson threw Race out of the ring, Flair hit a running forearm smash on Vader then proceeded to chop the champion repeatedly. Flair then attempted another running maneuver only to be met with a bell clap from Vader. Flair then grabbed Vader's left leg, causing him to trip and fall, and pinned him with a roll-up to win the match and the title.

== Reception ==
Dave Meltzer of the Wrestling Observer Newsletter gave the Vader vs. Flair main event a rating of 4-1/2 (out of 5) stars, calling it a defining moment in Flair's career and most memorable of his numerous (11 at the time) title wins.

The event did a 0.55 pay-per-view buyrate, just above average for WCW's core PPV audience at the time. The show did double the business of the previous month's WCW pay-per-view, Battlebowl, with Starrcade considered a mild success due to being the last of four consecutive monthly pay-per-views, an unusual practice at the time. As highly promoted as Starrcade was, it only drew about 15-20,000 more buys than poorly promoted WCW pay-per-views earlier in the year. The live event gross was $65,000 and the pay-per-view gross for WCW and Turner was $1.35 million. Paid attendance was about 7,000, with 1,000 comps, and a large amount of $8 tickets sold.

== Aftermath ==
Big Van Vader continued to feud with Ric Flair until SuperBrawl IV, where Flair defeated Vader in a Thundercage match to retain the WCW World Heavyweight Championship. Flair then defended and retained the title against Ricky Steamboat before defeating Sting at Clash of the Champions XXVII in a championship unification match to unify the WCW World Heavyweight Championship and the WCW International World Heavyweight Championship. Flair turned heel and began a feud with Hulk Hogan, who debuted with the promotion in June 1994. Their feud was the main focus of the year for the promotion, with their first match occurring at Bash at the Beach. Hogan won the title, and they continued to wrestle in rematches for the remainder of the year. Hogan remained the champion, and his reign continued for over a year.

== Legacy ==
On December 30, 2019, Starrcade 1993 was the topic of the ‘83 Weeks’ podcast hosted by Eric Bischoff and Conrad Thompson.

== Results ==
No.	Results	Stipulations	Times
1^{D}	Terry Taylor defeated The Equalizer	Singles match	—
2	Pretty Wonderful (Paul Orndorff and Paul Roma) (with The Assassin) defeated 2 Cold Scorpio and Marcus Alexander Bagwell (with Teddy Long)	Tag team match	11:45
3	The Shockmaster defeated Awesome Kong (with King Kong)	Singles match	01:34
4	Lord Steven Regal (c) (with Sir William) vs. Ricky Steamboat ended in a time-limit draw	Singles match for the WCW World Television Championship	15:14
5	Cactus Jack and Maxx Payne defeated Tex Slazenger and Shanghai Pierce	Tag team match	07:48
6	Steve Austin (with Col. Robert Parker) defeated Dustin Rhodes (c) by 2-0	Two-out-of-three-falls match for the WCW United States Heavyweight Championship	23:56
7	Rick Rude (c) defeated The Boss	Singles match for the WCW International World Heavyweight Championship	09:08
8	Road Warrior Hawk and Sting defeated the Nasty Boys (Brian Knobbs and Jerry Sags) (c) (with Missy Hyatt) by disqualification	Tag team match for the WCW World Tag Team Championship	29:11
9	Ric Flair defeated Big Van Vader (c) (with Harley Race)	Title vs. career match for the WCW World Heavyweight Championship	21:18
(c) / – the champion(s) heading into the match; D / – this was a dark match
