= Fall Brawl '93: War Games =

1993 World Championship Wrestling pay-per-view event

- VHS cover featuring Rick Rude, Ric Flair, Sting, Big Van Vader, Davey Boy Smith and Sid Vicious
- Promotion: World Championship Wrestling
- Date: September 19, 1993
- City: Houston, Texas
- Venue: Astro Arena
- Attendance: 6,000
- Buy rate: 95,000
- Tagline: One Will Rise, One Will Fall

Pay-per-view chronology
← Previous; Beach Blast	Next → Halloween Havoc

Fall Brawl chronology
← Previous; First	Next → 1994

Fall Brawl '93: War Games was the inaugural Fall Brawl professional wrestling pay-per-view (PPV) event produced by World Championship Wrestling (WCW). It was originally held as an annual September WCW Clash Of The Champions Event On TBS from 1988 to 1992. It took place on September 19, 1993, from the Astro Arena (now NRG Arena) in Houston, Texas.

Eight matches were contested at the event. The main event was a WarGames match, in which the team of The Superpowers (Sting and Davey Boy Smith), Dustin Rhodes and The Shockmaster (with Road Warrior Animal) defeated The Masters of the Powerbomb (Sid Vicious and Big Van Vader) and Harlem Heat (Kole and Kane). Also on the card, Rick Rude defeated Ric Flair to win the WCW International World Heavyweight Championship. Other title changes included Lord Steven Regal winning the World Television Championship and The Nasty Boys winning the World Tag Team Championship.

== Production ==
=== Background ===
The WarGames match was created when Dusty Rhodes was inspired by a viewing of Mad Max Beyond Thunderdome. It was originally used as a specialty match for the Four Horsemen. The first WarGames match took place at The Omni in Atlanta during the NWA's Great American Bash 1987 tour, where it was known as War Games: The Match Beyond. It became a traditional Fall Brawl event from 1993 to 1998.

=== Storylines ===
The event comprised professional wrestling matches that resulted from scripted storylines on WCW's television programs Saturday Night, Main Event, Pro, WorldWide and Power Hour. Professional wrestlers portrayed villains, heroes, or less distinguishable characters to build tension and culminate in a wrestling match or series of matches.

After returning to WCW at SuperBrawl III, Ric Flair defeated Barry Windham at Beach Blast to win the NWA World Heavyweight Championship. On the August 28 episode of Saturday Night, Flair hosted an edition of his talk show A Flair for the Gold with Fifi, which was interrupted by Rick Rude, who forcibly kissed Fifi. After a confrontation, Flair closed the segment, and then Rude attacked him from behind and delivered a Rude Awakening to Flair on the floor and promised to take away his title and Fifi. Later that night, Flair was scheduled to defend the NWA World Heavyweight Championship against Rude at Fall Brawl. WCW withdrew from the NWA on September 1, which led to WCW keeping the Big Gold Belt that represented the NWA World Heavyweight Championship at the time and renamed it the International World Heavyweight Championship. On the September 11 episode of Saturday Night, Flair cost Rude his match against Dustin Rhodes in the decisive match of the best of three match series for the vacant United States Heavyweight Championship by preventing Rude from hitting Rhodes with a steel chair, causing enough distraction for Rhodes to win the title.

At Beach Blast, The Superpowers (Sting and Davey Boy Smith) defeated The Masters of the Powerbomb (Big Van Vader and Sid Vicious) in a tag team match when Smith pinned Vader. As a result of pinning Vader, Smith earned a title shot against Vader for the WCW World Heavyweight Championship at the following month's Clash of the Champions XXIV, where Vader retained the title with the assistance of Harley Race. Also at the event, Harlem Heat (Kole and Kane) were revealed to be Vicious and Vader's tag team partners against the team of Sting, Smith and Rhodes in the WarGames match during Ric Flair's A Flair for the Gold segment. Sting introduced their mystery partner, The Shockmaster, who had an infamously botched debut during the segment. The two teams competed in several matches on WCW television before the event.

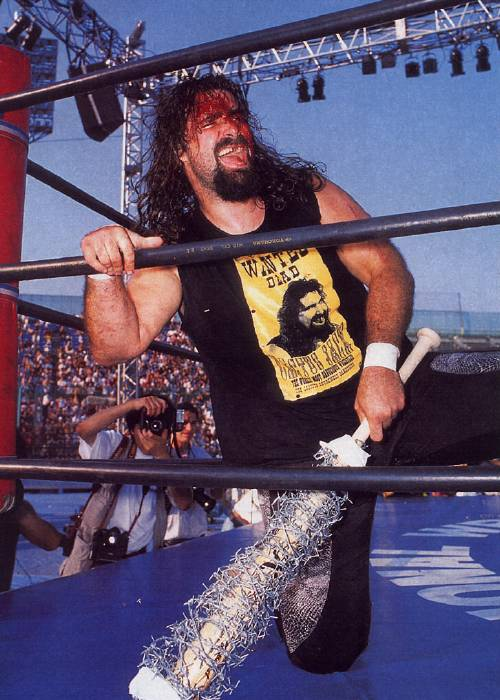
Cactus Jack made his highly anticipated return heading into Fall Brawl.

Cactus Jack had been feuding with Harley Race since Big Van Vader and Race attacked Jack during his street fight against Paul Orndorff on the January 10 episode of Main Event. Vader injured Jack by powerbombing him on the concrete floor during a match between the two on the April 24 episode of Saturday Night, thus putting Jack, who was taken out in a stretcher, out of action. Race took possession of a small cherished bag of Jack's. Throughout the summer of 1993, the missing Cactus Jack was sought out by WCW, with it explained that he had been institutionalized and developed suffering from amnesia (though this was later revealed to be a ruse). On the August 7 episode of Saturday Night, Yoshi Kwan debuted as Race's new client, wearing Jack's bag around his neck. At Clash of the Champions XXIV on August 18, Jack returned to WCW and saved Davey Boy Smith from a post-match assault by Vader and Harley Race. On the August 28 episode of Saturday Night, Jack was scheduled to face Kwan in a bounty match at Fall Brawl with the possession of Jack's bag on the line.

== Event ==
Other on-screen personnel
Role:	Name:
Commentators	Tony Schiavone
Commentators	Jesse Ventura
Interviewer	Eric Bischoff
Ring announcer	Michael Buffer
Ring announcer	Gary Michael Cappetta
Referees	Randy Anderson
Referees	Nick Patrick

=== Dark match ===
Before the event aired live on pay-per-view, Erik Watts defeated Bobby Eaton via submission by making him submit to the STF.

=== Preliminary matches ===
In the first match of the event, Ricky Steamboat defended the World Television Championship against Lord Steven Regal. Steamboat was injured, and his ribs were taped due to the injury. Regal aggravated the injury by attacking the injured ribs. Despite being assaulted, Steamboat made a comeback with a flying crossbody on Regal, which further injured his ribs and Regal's manager Sir William hit him in the ribs with an umbrella, allowing Regal to perform a German suplex to win the title.

Next, Charlie Norris competed against Big Sky. After a back and forth action, Norris performed a running bicycle kick to Big Sky for the victory.

Marcus Alexander Bagwell and 2 Cold Scorpio competed against Paul Orndorff and The Equalizer in a tag team match. Orndorff and Equalizer dominated Bagwell throughout the earlier portion of the match until a brawl broke out between all the four men, during which Orndorff accidentally hit Equalizer, which allowed Scorpio to perform a 450° splash on Equalizer for the win. After the match, Orndorff and Equalizer attacked their opponents.

In the next match, Ice Train took on Shanghai Pierce and his tag team partner Tex Slazenger was at ringside. Train dominated Pierce throughout the match, which led to Slazenger trip Train from his feet to try to assist Pierce in winning but Train countered their double-team attempt and performed a Powerslam on Pierce to get the victory.

The Four Horsemen members Arn Anderson and Paul Roma defended the World Tag Team Championship against The Nasty Boys (Brian Knobbs and Jerry Sags). Nasty Boys had hinted at bringing a surprise for Horsemen, and Missy Hyatt was revealed to be their valet. Nasty Boys dominated the champions throughout the match until Roma made a comeback and tagged in Anderson, and then Nasty Boys regained the momentum again. Roma tagged back in again, and Anderson delivered an AA Spinebuster and Roma delivered a diving splash. The referee was distracted in ejecting Anderson from the ring, allowing Sags to deliver a diving elbow drop to Roma to win the titles.

Next, Cactus Jack fought Yoshi Kwan in a bounty match. After some brawling between the two, Race tried to distract Jack, but the interference backfired, and Race was hit on the apron, allowing Jack to perform a double-arm DDT to win the match and regain his bag. After the match, Jack suplexed Race in the ring and challenged Big Van Vader to a match at Halloween Havoc.

=== Main event matches ===
In the penultimate match of the event, Ric Flair defended the International World Heavyweight Championship against Rick Rude. Flair applied the Figure Four Leglock during the early moments of the match but Rude avoided it by grabbing the ropes. Flair then applied an armbar to injure Rude's arm until Rude gained momentum. Rude constantly teased Flair's maid Fifi at ringside throughout the match, which lead to Fifi ultimately going to the backstage near the end of the match. Flair attempted to apply a Figure Four Leglock on Rude but Rude hit him with a pair of brass knuckles to win the title.

In the WarGames match, The Shockmaster made his in-ring debut in WCW as the tag team partner of The Superpowers (Sting and Davey Boy Smith) and Dustin Rhodes against The Masters of the Powerbomb (Sid Vicious and Big Van Vader) and Harlem Heat (Kole and Kane). Rhodes and Vader started the match. After a back and forth match, Shockmaster entered in as the last entrant of the match and immediately put Kole in a Bearhug and Kole submitted to the hold, leading to Sting's team winning the match.

== Reception ==
The event mostly received negative reviews from critics. J.D. Dunn scored the event rated 2 out of 10 stars, "Started out okay with the Steamboat/Regal match, but it was ALL downhill after that. The talented guys either didn't give effort, were mismatched, or had been beaten down by bad booking. The rest was just horrible gimmicks and wrestling. One of the worst shows of all time. Just awful."

Arnold Furious rated the event 2.5 out of 10 stars: "WCW gets even worse here. This is a new low by my reckoning and possibly the worst WCW show ever, by this point. Especially considering the stacked nature of the card." The International World Heavyweight Championship and World Tag Team Championship matches received negative reviews. The WarGames match was criticized for having a "weak finish" but Furious appreciated Ricky Steamboat's performance in the World Television Championship opening match, with Steamboat being "one of the few guys on the roster with enough pride to not call it in when the opportunity presents itself." He further added, "Not that the booking helped any. Bischoff’s Disney tapings killed any heat the majority of the matches would have had, and WCW in 1993, despite their great roster, would push some of the biggest, most worthless lumps they could find. Fred Ottman, Dave Sullivan, Ice Train, Charlie Norris and that’s just this show. Thumbs way down. Avoid at all costs."

== Aftermath ==
Rick Rude and Ric Flair continued their rivalry after Fall Brawl, and a rematch was scheduled between the two for the International World Heavyweight Championship at Halloween Havoc on the October 2 episode of Saturday Night. At Halloween Havoc, Rude successfully defended the title against Flair after Flair was disqualified for hitting Rude with brass knuckles. Flair would ultimately win the WCW World Heavyweight Championship by defeating Vader at Starrcade.

Cactus Jack continued his feud with Harley Race and was seeking revenge against Vader for injuring him in April. On October 16 episode of Saturday Night, Jack ended his feud with Kwan by defeating him in a rematch from Fall Brawl. At Halloween Havoc, Vader defeated Jack in a Texas Deathmatch. The two were then randomly paired as tag team partners for a match at Battlebowl, which ended their feud, and Jack then formed a tag team with Maxx Payne.

On the October 2 episode of Saturday Night, Ricky Steamboat defeated Lord Steven Regal in a non-title rematch. The two would then be randomly paired as tag team partners at Battlebowl, during which Steamboat attacked Regal and Sir William with their own umbrella. This led to Regal defending the World Television Championship against Steamboat at Starrcade, where Regal retained the title after the match ended in a fifteen-minute time limit draw.

Arn Anderson and Paul Roma received their rematch for the World Tag Team Championship against Nasty Boys on the October 2 episode of Saturday Night, where Nasty Boys retained the title. Nasty Boys lost the titles to Marcus Alexander Bagwell and 2 Cold Scorpio on the October 23 Saturday Night but regained the titles the following night at Halloween Havoc.

Sting and Sid Vicious continued their rivalry after Fall Brawl, leading to a match between the two at Halloween Havoc, which Sting won after Col. Robert Parker accidentally cost Vicious the match.

== Home media and streaming ==
The event was released on VHS in the United Kingdom by Turner Home Entertainment in 1994. It was the last WCW home video to be released in the UK until Spring Stampede 1997.

In 2014, the event was included on the WWE's streaming platform the WWE Network as part of its launch and remained on the service until the platform closed in 2026. In September 2025, the WWE uploaded the event to their WCW YouTube channel, for free streaming.

== Results ==
No.	Results	Stipulations	Times
1^{D}	Erik Watts defeated Bobby Eaton via submission	Singles match	—
2	Lord Steven Regal (with Sir William) defeated Ricky Steamboat (c)	Singles match for the WCW World Television Championship	17:05
3	Charlie Norris defeated Big Sky	Singles match	04:34
4	2 Cold Scorpio and Marcus Bagwell defeated The Equalizer and Paul Orndorff	Tag team match	10:46
5	Ice Train defeated Shanghai Pierce (with Tex Slazenger)	Singles match	03:27
6	The Nasty Boys (Brian Knobbs and Jerry Sags) (with Missy Hyatt) defeated Arn Anderson and Paul Roma (c)	Tag team match for the WCW World Tag Team Championship	23:58
7	Cactus Jack defeated Yoshi Kwan (with Harley Race)	Singles match	03:38
8	Rick Rude defeated Ric Flair (c) (with Fifi)	Singles match for the WCW International World Heavyweight Championship	30:47
9	Sting, Davey Boy Smith, Dustin Rhodes and The Shockmaster (with Road Warrior Animal) defeated Sid Vicious, Big Van Vader and Harlem Heat (Kole and Kane) (with Harley Race and Col. Robert Parker)	WarGames match	16:39
(c) / – the champion(s) heading into the match; D / – this was a dark match
