= Alex Wright =

German professional wrestler (born 1975)

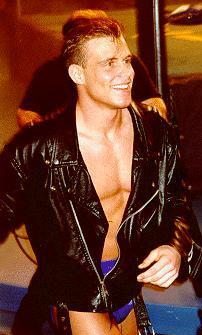
- Wright in 1995

Personal information
- Born: Alexander Wright; May 17, 1975 (age 51) Nuremberg, West Germany

Professional wrestling career
- Ring name(s): Alex Wright; Berlyn
- Billed height: 6 ft 4 in (193 cm)
- Billed weight: 225 lb (102 kg)
- Billed from: Nuremberg, Germany; Berlin, Germany
- Trained by: Steve Wright
- Debut: 1991
- Retired: May 31, 2003

Alexander Wright (born May 17, 1975) is a German former professional wrestler and professional wrestling promoter. He wrestled professionally in Germany and Japan before signing with World Championship Wrestling (WCW) in 1994. He is known for his iconic dance to his techno entrance theme song. He remained a prominent mid-card performer during his seven-year tenure with WCW, including reigns as a one time Cruiserweight Champion, a one time World Television Champion and a one time World Tag Team Champion (with Disco Inferno).

He was the owner, founder and CEO of New Sport Entertainment GmbH which is the company that owns New European Championship Wrestling.

== Professional wrestling career ==
=== Early career (1991–1994) ===
Alex was trained by his father Steve Wright, a British professional wrestler. He wrestled his first match in 1991 in Germany when he was sixteen years old. He wrestled in his hometown during his early career and also worked in Japan.

=== World Championship Wrestling (1994–2001) ===
==== Das Wunderkind (1994–1996) ====
Wright was discovered by World Championship Wrestling (WCW) in mid-1994 when WCW toured through Germany. He signed a contract with Time Warner, the parent company of WCW, and went through more training at the WCW Power Plant. Wright made his WCW debut, defeating Brady Boone on the September 3rd edition of Saturday Night. He originally wrestled as a babyface and was known as "Das Wunderkind" Alex Wright. His entrance music ("Warped Mind" by Dominic Glynn), was of the techno genre, which was popular in some American and German dance clubs at the time, and he often danced as he walked to the ring or once he got in the ring. His first feud was with Jean-Paul Levesque, whom he defeated at Starrcade in December in both men's pay-per-view debut. In his early career, Wright went undefeated in matches against several WCW superstars including Bobby Eaton in January 1995 at Clash of the Champions XXX and Paul Roma at SuperBrawl V in February '95. However, the latter saw Roma's contract later terminated by WCW because of his stiff performance and his disregard of instructions to put Wright over during the match. WCW had Wright feud on and off with Disco Inferno, another wrestler who danced in or on his way to the ring, with Wright representing modern dancing and music, and Disco representing older styles. Wright would win all of the matches in this feud.

Wright wrestled Arn Anderson for the WCW World Television Championship on an episode of WCW Saturday Night and beat Anderson by DQ. A rematch was scheduled for the next pay-per-view, Slamboree '95: A Legends' Reunion, where Wright suffered his first loss.

Due to WCW's partnership with New Japan Pro-Wrestling (NJPW), Wright participated in NJPW's Best of the Super Juniors and finished third in the tournament. He started wrestling against fellow cruiserweight and babyface Brian Pillman, whom he defeated in the opening match at The Great American Bash. On the July 16 edition of Main Event before Bash at the Beach, Wright teamed with Marcus Bagwell to face Dick Slater and Bunkhouse Buck in a losing effort. He had encounters with other up and coming WCW stars such as Diamond Dallas Page in August at Clash of the Champions XXXI. In September 1995 on Nitro, Wright wrestled Sabu. Sabu won the match but continued to attack Wright, even putting him through a table. Referee Nick Patrick thus reversed his decision, disqualifying Sabu for his violence and giving the win to Wright. Wright had several matches against Eddie Guerrero, with a very notable match taking place on The Main Event before Fall Brawl 1995: War Games, which resulted in a draw. Wright also had several matches in '95 and '96 against Dean Malenko. In January 1996, at Clash of the Champions XXXII, Malenko defeated Wright by pinfall.

At World War 3, Wright took part in the first-ever three-ring 60-man battle royal for the vacant World Heavyweight Championship, which was won by Randy Savage. At Starrcade, WCW wrestlers faced NJPW wrestlers in a World Cup of Wrestling. Wright represented WCW against NJPW's Koji Kanemoto (for the IWGP Junior Heavyweight Championship even though WCW never announced it as such) but ended up losing the bout to Kanemoto. Wright then began a feud with Dick Slater, to whom he lost at Uncensored in a singles dark match. At Slamboree, Wright was forced by WCW to be teamed with his wrestling and dancing nemesis Disco Inferno in a tag team match against Slater and Eaton. Wright and Disco lost when Disco was pinned. In June of '96, famed Japanese wrestler Antonio Inoki helped put together the World Wrestling Peace Festival, which was held in Los Angeles. Wright wrestled and lost to Chris Benoit on that card. On the August 10 edition of Saturday Night that aired immediately before Hog Wild, Wright defeated Bobby Eaton in a rematch.

At World War 3, Wright again participated in a three-ring, 60-man battle royal, with the winner getting a shot at the World Heavyweight Championship. The battle royal was won by The Giant. In January '97 on Clash of the Champions XXXIV, Wright lost to Masa Chono, who had recently come to the U.S. and joined the nWo.

==== Championship reigns (1997) ====
WCW had Wright wrestle in several tag team matches with fellow midcarders, mostly on the losing side. On the May 12, 1997, edition of Nitro, Wright partnered with Ice Train against Konan and Hugh Morrus of the Dungeon of Doom, a match in which Wright openly displayed heelish behavior such as teasing the return of his dance routine that he had temporarily shelved as a babyface, and clashing with Train's manager Teddy Long during the match. This culminated in Wright claiming to be unable to continue due to a sudden unexplainable knee injury, angrily confronting Long and then abandoning Ice Train, leaving him to lose the match by submission. Wright was then pushed as a heel for the remainder of 1997, which led to his first championship gold: on the July 28 edition of Nitro, he defeated Chris Jericho to win the Cruiserweight Championship. Wright feuded with Jericho thereafter, including a successful title defense against Jericho at Road Wild, before dropping the title back to Jericho on August 16 edition of Saturday Night. However, five days later, he defeated Último Dragón on the August 21 Clash of the Champions XXXV to win the World Television Championship. Wright was able to successfully defend the TV title against Lord Steven Regal on an episode on Nitro.

At Fall Brawl, Wright made a successful title defense against Último Dragón in a rematch before dropping the title to rival Disco Inferno on September 22 edition of Nitro. Wright feuded with Steve McMichael after McMichael's valet Debra left him and became Wright's valet. She ordered the feud and in the rivalry, Wright defeated McMichael at Halloween Havoc, with help from Goldberg, who promptly attacked Wright postmatch. The next month at World War 3, McMichael took out Goldberg prior to their match and Wright was literally dragged to the ring by Debra to wrestle McMichael again, and this time suffered a defeat.

Wright would go on to be managed by Debra for a little while longer. Debra would often try to illegally interfere in matches to help him win, but the plan would usually backfire, causing Wright to lose. He then cut ties with Debra after a string of losses that Wright claimed was her fault.

==== The Dancing Fools (1998) ====
Wright would then begin to patch things up with former rival Disco Inferno as they began teaming in 1998 to form a moderately successful tag team called the Dancing Fools, which at times also featured Japanese wrestler Tokyo Magnum in the role of a tag-along who regularly attempted to imitate their dancing styles. Wright and Inferno feuded with The Public Enemy (Johnny Grunge and Rocco Rock), including a loss to Grunge and Rocco at Road Wild. Wright then began an angle where he claimed that he was the best WCW wrestler to come out of Europe. British Bulldog, however, disputed Wright's proclamation, leading to a feud between Wright and Inferno against Bulldog and Jim Neidhart. The feud culminated at Fall Brawl, where the Dancing Fools lost to Bulldog and Neidhart. After suffering losses, Wright and Inferno split and began singles careers again.

Wright feuded with another fellow European wrestler, Fit Finlay, because he blamed Finlay for ending his father's career. Wright took his father's revenge from Finlay by beating him at Halloween Havoc.

Wright again competed in the 60-man battle royal at the '98 edition of World War III, with that year's battle royal being won by Kevin Nash.

==== Berlyn (1999–2000) ====
At the beginning of 1999, Wright was kept off WCW television for an extended length of time until May, when Wright came up with his own idea for a gimmick. Promotional spots began appearing on WCW television featuring Wright as a surprising new Rivethead-style character named Berlyn (an intentional misspelling of the city Berlin, the capital of Wright's home country Germany), with a black Mohawk and goatee replacing his blond hair. He was clad entirely in black with a long trench coat and arrogantly refused to speak English. He spoke through an interpreter—Uta Ludendorff—and was accompanied to the ring by a large wrestler known as The Wall. The promos coincided with the aftermath of the Columbine school massacre, which threw a hitch in WCW's plans. Sensing the unintentional similarities in dress between Berlyn and the teenage killers, WCW delayed the debut of Berlyn for several months. During his debut on August 30 on Nitro, he quickly insulted Americans, debuting the character as a heel.

Wright was booked to face Buff Bagwell at Fall Brawl shortly after his debut, but the match did not take place. While WCW claimed that Bagwell had missed his flight, Bagwell was in the arena but did not want to lose. WCW replaced Bagwell with Hacksaw Jim Duggan, and Wright's problems continued as Duggan no-sold all of Wright's offense and did not cooperate in the ring. Berlyn instead wrestled and defeated Bagwell on the next night's Nitro. Afterwards, Berlyn attacked Scott Armstrong and began a feud with Brad Armstrong. Alex (as Berlyn) and Brad Armstrong had a match at Halloween Havoc, which Berlyn lost. After the match, Berlyn and The Wall attacked Armstrong. Although Berlyn had been given a push after the fiasco with Duggan and Bagwell, his gimmick was unpopular. WCW furthered the damage by giving The Wall a singles push, leaving Wright to flounder in the mid-card.

On the October 25 edition of Nitro, it was announced that a tournament would be held for the vacant World Heavyweight Championship and the finals would occur at Mayhem. On the following edition of Nitro, Berlyn participated in the tournament but lost his first round match to Vampiro. Berlyn began a small feud with Vampiro and cost him his second round match in the tournament against Buff Bagwell. At Mayhem, Vampiro defeated Berlyn in a Dog Collar match after the Wall turned on Berlyn. Berlyn then feuded with the Wall before disappearing from WCW television again.

==== Boogie Knights (2000–2001) ====
After several months off from wrestling, Wright returned under his real name on the September 27, 2000, edition of Thunder during a match between former partner, Disco Inferno, now renamed "Disqo" (a pun on the name of then-popular R&B singer Sisqó), and Konnan. Wright helped Disqo in getting the victory and the duo reunited as the Boogie Knights. Wright was now completely bald but had returned to his previous dancing mannerisms. The Boogie Knights began a feud with The Filthy Animals while they also feuded with two members of The Natural Born Thrillers (Sean O'Haire and Mark Jindrak), who were the World Tag Team Champions at the time. At Halloween Havoc, the three teams participated in a triangle match but O'Haire and Jindrak won the match. Disqo and Wright would then go on to win the World Tag Team Championship from O'Haire and Jindrak at Millennium Germany on November 16. However, four days later on Nitro, due to Disqo being out with an injury, Wright and substitute Elix Skipper lost the titles to Chuck Palumbo and Shawn Stasiak, two other members of the Natural Born Thrillers.

Wright then started an angle where he kept KroniK (Brian Adams and Bryan Clark) as his bodyguards to squash other cruiserweights. At Mayhem, Wright and KroniK faced Billy Kidman and Rey Misterio, Jr. in a 3-on-2 handicap match. However, KroniK abandoned Wright after the 15 minutes they were paid for expired, leading to him being pinned. Disqo eventually returned from his injury and the Boogie Knights gimmick lasted until WCW was purchased by World Wrestling Federation (WWF) in March 2001. Wright remained under contract with AOL Time Warner, as his contract was not bought out by the WWF.

=== Retirement ===
Wright fell out of the spotlight after the folding of WCW and has not appeared on American television since then. Wright stated in an interview that WWE could not sign him as he was one of the few who was under contract with AOL Time Warner at the time. He also stated that he took a break from wrestling as he was not happy with the backstage politics in WCW that were happening at the time. In the years following, Wright has stayed away from regular active competition, only wrestling on rare occasions for German wrestling promotions NAWA and GWP.

He wrestled his last match on May 31, 2003 defeating Chris the Bambi Killer for NAWA in Uelzen, Germany.

After working as a banker and fitness instructor, he opened a pro-wrestling school called "The Wright Stuff" in Nuremberg, Germany. Notable students include former WWE wrestler Giovanni Vinci. In 2009, he started his own wrestling promotion called New European Championship Wrestling (NEW).

== Championships and accomplishments ==
- Pro Wrestling Illustrated
  - Rookie of the Year (1995)
  - Ranked No. 54 of the 500 best singles wrestlers of the year in the PWI 500 in 1995
  - Ranked No. 408 of the top 500 singles wrestlers of the PWI Years in 2003
- World Championship Wrestling
  - WCW Cruiserweight Championship (1 time)
  - WCW World Television Championship (1 time)
  - WCW World Tag Team Championship (1 time) – with Disco Inferno
  - World Cup Of Wrestling (1995) – with Sting, Randy Savage, Lex Luger, Johnny B. Badd, Eddie Guerrero, and Chris Benoit

== Other media ==
Wright appears in the wrestling themed episode of Louis Theroux's Weird Weekends. In this episode, Wright mentions that he was to debut his new gimmick (Alexander Wright) that night in WCW. He later renamed the gimmick "Berlyn".
