= Fall Brawl '94: War Games =

1994 World Championship Wrestling pay-per-view event

- VHS cover
- Promotion: World Championship Wrestling
- Date: September 18, 1994
- City: Roanoke, Virginia
- Venue: Roanoke Civic Center
- Attendance: 6,500
- Buy rate: 115,000

Pay-per-view chronology
← Previous; Bash at the Beach	Next → Halloween Havoc

Fall Brawl chronology
← Previous; 1993	Next → 1995

Fall Brawl '94: War Games was the second Fall Brawl professional wrestling pay-per-view (PPV) event produced by World Championship Wrestling (WCW). It took place on September 18, 1994 from the Roanoke Civic Center in Roanoke, Virginia.

== Production ==
=== Background ===
The WarGames match was created when Dusty Rhodes was inspired by Mad Max Beyond Thunderdome. It was originally used as a specialty match for the Four Horsemen. The first WarGames match took place at The Omni in Atlanta during the NWA's Great American Bash '87 tour. It became the traditional main event at Fall Brawl pay-per-views from 1993 to 1998.

=== Storylines ===
The event featured professional wrestling matches that involve different wrestlers from pre-existing scripted feuds and storylines. Professional wrestlers portray villains, heroes, or less distinguishable characters in the scripted events that build tension and culminate in a wrestling match or series of matches.

== Event ==
Other on-screen personnel
Role:	Name:
Commentator	Tony Schiavone
Commentator	Bobby Heenan
Interviewer	Gene Okerlund
Ring announcer	Gary Michael Cappetta
Ring announcer	Michael Buffer
Referees	Randy Anderson
Referees	Nick Patrick

Ricky Steamboat was originally scheduled to defend the WCW United States Championship against Steve Austin, but he was suffering from a back injury and could not compete. As a result, Austin won the United States title by forfeit. This was Steamboat's last appearance in WCW as he was fired shortly thereafter and decided to retire from the ring. Following the announcement that Austin was the new champion WCW Commissioner Nick Bockwinkel declared that Austin would defend his title against a mystery opponent. As Austin was protesting the decision, saying he would not wrestle again that night, Hacksaw Jim Duggan was revealed as the mystery opponent.

In the triangle match, Big Van Vader pinned The Guardian Angel in the first part of the match. The second part, between Vader and Sting ended in a 15-minute time limit draw. Referee Nick Patrick continued the match with a five-minute overtime and, when that period expired with no decision, with a sudden death period, in which the first wrestler to be taken off his feet would lose. Vader won when a masked man attacked Sting while Race and the Guardian Angel fought at ringside, distracting Patrick; Sting had knocked Vader down first but Vader got up before Patrick turned his back to the action and declared Vader the winner. As per a pre-match stipulation, Big Van Vader was declared number one contender for Hulk Hogan's WCW World Heavyweight Championship.

== Results ==
No.	Results	Stipulations	Times
1^{D}	Brad Armstrong and Brian Armstrong defeated Bad Attitude (Steve Keirn and Bobby Eaton)	Tag team match	—
2	Johnny B. Badd defeated Lord Steven Regal (c) (with Sir William)	Singles match for the WCW World Television Championship	11:08
3	Kevin Sullivan (with Dave Sullivan) defeated Cactus Jack	Loser Leaves WCW match	06:08
4	Jim Duggan defeated Steve Austin (c)	Singles match for the WCW United States Heavyweight Championship	00:35
5	Pretty Wonderful (Paul Orndorff and Paul Roma) (c) defeated Stars and Stripes (The Patriot and Marcus Alexander Bagwell)	Tag team match for the WCW World Tag Team Championship	12:54
6	Vader (with Harley Race) defeated Sting and The Guardian Angel	Triangle Elimination match	30:22
7	Dusty Rhodes, Dustin Rhodes and The Nasty Boys (Brian Knobbs and Jerry Sags) defeated The Stud Stable (Terry Funk, Arn Anderson, Bunkhouse Buck and Col. Robert Parker) (with Meng)	WarGames match	19:05
(c) / – the champion(s) heading into the match; D / – this was a dark match
