= Fall Brawl '98: War Games =

1998 World Championship Wrestling pay-per-view event

- VHS cover featuring Goldberg and Sting
- Promotion: World Championship Wrestling
- Brand(s): WCW nWo
- Date: September 13, 1998
- City: Winston-Salem, North Carolina
- Venue: Lawrence Joel Veterans Memorial Coliseum
- Attendance: 11,528
- Buy rate: 275,000
- Tagline: No Retreat. No Surrender. One Rule: Take No Prisoners.

Pay-per-view chronology
← Previous; Road Wild	Next → Halloween Havoc

Fall Brawl chronology
← Previous; 1997	Next → 1999

Fall Brawl '98: War Games was the sixth Fall Brawl professional wrestling pay-per-view (PPV) event produced by World Championship Wrestling (WCW). It took place on September 13, 1998, from the Lawrence Joel Veterans Memorial Coliseum in Winston-Salem, North Carolina.

Nine matches were contested at the event. In the main event, Team WCW (Diamond Dallas Page, Roddy Piper and The Warrior) defeated nWo Hollywood (Bret Hart, Hollywood Hogan and Stevie Ray) and nWo Wolfpac (Kevin Nash, Lex Luger and Sting) in a WarGames match, with Page pinning Ray to win the match and earn a WCW World Heavyweight Championship opportunity at Halloween Havoc. In another prominent match, Perry Saturn defeated Raven in a Raven's Rules match to free The Flock from Raven's control.

The event garnered negative reviews from critics, with the matches being criticised for lacking substance and setting up angles instead, and is regarded as one of the worst PPVs in WCW history. However, the Raven's Rules bout received praise, and was singled out as the best match of the night by most critics.

== Production ==
=== Background ===
The WarGames match was created when Dusty Rhodes was inspired by a viewing of Mad Max Beyond Thunderdome. It was originally used as a specialty match for the Four Horsemen. The first WarGames match took place at The Omni in Atlanta during the NWA's Great American Bash '87 tour, where it was known as War Games: The Match Beyond. It became a traditional Fall Brawl event from 1993 to 1998.

=== Storylines ===
The event featured professional wrestling matches that involve different wrestlers from pre-existing scripted feuds and storylines. Professional wrestlers portray villains, heroes, or less distinguishable characters in the scripted events that build tension and culminate in a wrestling match or series of matches.

== Event ==
Other on-screen personnel
Role:	Name:
Commentators	Tony Schiavone
Commentators	Bobby Heenan
Commentators	Mike Tenay
Interviewer	Gene Okerlund
Referees	Mark Curtis
Referees	Scott Dickinson
Referees	Mickie Jay
Referees	Nick Patrick
Referees	Charles Robinson
Referees	Billy Silverman

Prior to the match between Rick Steiner and Scott Steiner, WCW commissioner J. J. Dillon warned Scott that he would be permanently banned from WCW had he refused to wrestle against his brother in any way, even via no-show or forfeit. The match ended in a no-contest after Buff Bagwell pretended to re-injure his neck. As per a prematch stipulation, Saturn's victory freed The Flock from Raven's control; if Saturn had lost, he would have had to become Raven's servant. Chris Kanyon was also handcuffed to the ring. During the match, Kidman interfered on Saturn's behalf. In the WarGames Match Diamond Dallas Page pinned Stevie Ray after a Diamond Cutter. For the first time ever in a WarGames match, pinfalls were allowed. As a result of Page getting the pinfall victory; Page earned a shot at the WCW World Heavyweight Championship at Halloween Havoc.

A match between The Giant and Meng was advertised on WCW.com, but did not take place. WCW.com also advertised a Juventud Guerrera vs. Kaz Hayashi match, but it was announced that the match would actually be Guerrera vs. Silver King the night before the pay-per-view on WCW Saturday Night.

The match between Curt Hennig and Dean Malenko, while heavily built in storylines, was not advertised ahead of time.

During the match between The British Bulldog and Jim Neidhart against Disco Inferno and Alex Wright, Bulldog severely injured his back on a trap door installed in the ring for The Ultimate Warrior's entrance later in the show. Although it has been claimed that WCW wrestlers were not informed of the trapdoor prior to the show, Disco Inferno has disputed this version of events and has said that wrestlers were made aware of the trapdoor in the afternoon before the PPV.

== Reception ==
The event has received negative reviews from critics.

In 2012, Jack Bramma of 411Mania gave the event a rating of 4.0 [Poor], stating, "There are TWO good matches on the entire PPV and only one above ***. If there was a fifth rider of the Apocalypse, it'd look something like this PPV."

In 2021, Lance Augustine of TJR Wrestling gave the event a rating of 4/10, stating, "The Wrestling Observer poll had this show at a 99.4% thumbs down rating. I wanted to go into it with an open mind, and I have to say, the fans were right. There was nothing on this show of any substance and had a lot more angles than a Pay-Per-View should. The fact that this is the second straight month that Goldberg didn’t defend the title on a big show is ridiculous, but it’s like yelling down a hallway at this point. The one standout match on the show was Saturn vs. Raven, which should tell you the quality of the rest of the show. There were some spots here and there, but overall, this show was not very good."

In 2021, Thomas Hall of Wrestling Rumors gave the event a rating of F−, stating, "If there was a rating lower than this, the show would get that. This was dreadful throughout with Raven vs. Saturn being the only match worth checking out and even that’s a stretch. They took all of the good potential that WCW had been building up for months and wasted it in one night. No Guerrero, no Goldberg (he couldn’t even show up and beat on Jericho?), no Flair, and Anderson gets beaten down because we need to keep Curt Hennig looking strong. This ranks up there with the worst shows of all time and I can easily see why it was named the worst show of the year for 1998."

The event was named as the Worst Major Wrestling Show of 1998 by the Wrestling Observer Newsletter.

The event generated 275,000 ppv buys.

== Results ==
No.	Results	Stipulations	Times
1	The British Bulldog and Jim Neidhart defeated The Dancing Fools (Alex Wright and Disco Inferno)	Tag team match	11:03
2	Chris Jericho (c) defeated "Goldberg" (impersonator)	Singles match for the WCW World Television Championship	01:15
3	Ernest Miller defeated Norman Smiley	Singles match	05:04
4	Rick Steiner vs. Scott Steiner (with Buff Bagwell) ended in a no contest	Singles match (Note: Had Scott refused to wrestle Rick, even by way of a forfeit or no-show, he would have been permanently banned from WCW.)	05:30
5	Juventud Guerrera (c) defeated Silver King	Singles match for the WCW Cruiserweight Championship	08:36
6	Perry Saturn defeated Raven (with Kanyon and Lodi)	Raven's Rules match	14:04
7	Dean Malenko defeated Curt Hennig (with Rick Rude) by disqualification	Singles match	07:38
8	Konnan defeated Scott Hall (with Vincent)	Singles match	12:03
9	Team WCW (Diamond Dallas Page, Roddy Piper and The Warrior) defeated nWo Hollywood (Bret Hart, Hollywood Hogan and Stevie Ray) and nWo Wolfpac (Kevin Nash, Lex Luger and Sting)	WarGames match	20:06
(c) / – the champion(s) heading into the match
