= Jeff Farmer =

Jeff Farmer may refer to:

- Jeff Farmer (wrestler) (born 1962), professional wrestler best known as The nWo Sting
- Jeff Farmer (footballer) (born 1977), former Australian Rules footballer
