= Steve Wright (wrestler) =

English professional wrestler

Personal information
- Born: Steve Wright; 24 December 1953 (age 72) Warrington, England, UK

Professional wrestling career
- Ring name(s): Steve Wright; Bull Blitzer
- Billed height: 1.85 m (6 ft 1 in)
- Billed weight: 95 kg (209 lb; 15.0 st)
- Trained by: Ted Betley, Billy Riley
- Debut: 1969
- Retired: 1999

Steve Wright (born 24 December 1953) is an English professional wrestler. He is well known wrestling in Germany, most notably for Catch Wrestling Association.

== Career ==
Wright began his wrestling career in 1969 in the United Kingdom. In 1971, he made his debut in Germany. He also worked in Mexico from 1973 to 1974 and made his debut in North America, working in Los Angeles during 1974. From 1975 to 1977, Wright worked in Japan for New Japan Pro Wrestling.

Then in 1978, Wright made his debut for the Germany promotion Catch Wrestling Association where he spent the rest of his wrestling career. He became a three-time CWA Middleweight Champion.

Later in his career he worked for Verband der Berufsringer in Germany. He retired from wrestling in 1999.

== Personal life ==
Wright's brother, Bernie, was a wrestler. He is the father of Alex Wright and trained Alex.

== Championships and accomplishments ==
- Catch Wrestling Association
  - CWA World Middleweight Championship (3 times)
- Joint Promotions
  - World Mid-Heavyweight Championship (4 times)
