= Fall Brawl =

Professional wrestling pay-per-view event

- WCW Fall Brawl logo used since 1993
- Promotions: World Championship Wrestling
- First event: Fall Brawl '93: War Games
- Last event: Fall Brawl (2000)
- Signature matches: WarGames match

Fall Brawl was an annual professional wrestling pay-per-view (PPV) event produced by World Championship Wrestling (WCW) and was held in September from 1993 through 2000. The name was derived from the fall edition of Clash of the Champions, called "Fall Brawl", in 1988, 1989, 1990, and 1991. There was no Fall Brawl event held in 1992.

It was considered by many as WCW's answer to the World Wrestling Federation's annual Survivor Series pay-per-view event due to the main event WarGames match held during most of the Fall Brawl shows. World Wrestling Entertainment have owned the rights to Fall Brawl since they purchased WCW in March 2001 and although they have not produced the event under the main banner, Ohio Valley Wrestling did use the "Fall Brawl" name during the time it was a WWE development territory. In 2014, All WCW pay-per-views were made available on the WWE Network.

== Events ==
#	Event	Date	City	Venue	Main event
1	Fall Brawl '93: War Games	September 19, 1993	Houston, Texas	Astro Arena	The Superpowers (Sting and Davey Boy Smith), Dustin Rhodes and The Shockmaster vs. Sid Vicious, Vader and Harlem Heat (Kole and Kane) in a WarGames match
2	Fall Brawl '94: War Games	September 18, 1994	Roanoke, Virginia	Roanoke Civic Center	Dusty Rhodes, Dustin Rhodes and The Nasty Boys (Brian Knobbs and Jerry Sags) vs. The Stud Stable (Terry Funk, Arn Anderson, Bunkhouse Buck and Col. Robert Parker) in a WarGames match
3	Fall Brawl '95: War Games	September 17, 1995	Asheville, North Carolina	Asheville Civic Center	Hulk Hogan, Randy Savage, Lex Luger and Sting vs. The Dungeon of Doom (Kamala, Zodiac, Shark and Meng) in a WarGames match
4	Fall Brawl '96: War Games	September 15, 1996	Winston-Salem, North Carolina	Lawrence Joel Veterans Memorial Coliseum	nWo (Hollywood Hogan, Kevin Nash, Scott Hall and nWo Sting) vs. Team WCW (Lex Luger, Ric Flair, Arn Anderson and Sting) in a WarGames match
5	Fall Brawl '97: War Games	September 14, 1997	Winston-Salem, North Carolina	Lawrence Joel Veterans Memorial Coliseum	The nWo (Buff Bagwell, Kevin Nash, Syxx and Konnan) vs. The Four Horsemen (Chris Benoit, Steve McMichael, Ric Flair and Curt Hennig) in a WarGames match
6	Fall Brawl '98: War Games	September 13, 1998	Winston-Salem, North Carolina	Lawrence Joel Veterans Memorial Coliseum	Team WCW (Diamond Dallas Page, Roddy Piper and The Warrior) vs. nWo Hollywood (Hollywood Hogan, Stevie Ray and Bret Hart) vs. nWo Wolfpac (Kevin Nash, Sting and Lex Luger) in a WarGames match
7	Fall Brawl (1999)	September 12, 1999	Winston-Salem, North Carolina	Lawrence Joel Veterans Memorial Coliseum	Hulk Hogan (c) vs. Sting for the WCW World Heavyweight Championship
8	Fall Brawl (2000)	September 17, 2000	Buffalo, New York	HSBC Arena	Kevin Nash (c) vs. Booker T in a Steel Cage match for the WCW World Heavyweight Championship
(c) – refers to the champion(s) heading into the match
