= Halloween Havoc (1998) =

World Championship Wrestling pay-per-view event

- VHS cover featuring Hollywood Hogan and The Warrior
- Promotion: World Championship Wrestling
- Brand: WCW
- Date: October 25, 1998
- City: Paradise, Nevada
- Venue: MGM Grand Garden Arena
- Attendance: 10,663
- Buy rate: 310,000
- Tagline: The Night When Good Battles Evil

Pay-per-view chronology
← Previous; Fall Brawl	Next → World War 3

Halloween Havoc chronology
← Previous; 1997	Next → 1999

The 1998 Halloween Havoc was the 10th annual Halloween Havoc professional wrestling pay-per-view (PPV) event produced by World Championship Wrestling (WCW). It took place on October 25, 1998, from the MGM Grand Garden Arena in the Las Vegas suburb of Paradise, Nevada for the third consecutive year. The event is notable for both the Hollywood Hogan vs. The Warrior match, which is considered one of the worst matches of all time, and the Goldberg vs. Diamond Dallas Page match for the WCW World Heavyweight Championship, which is considered one of the greatest WCW matches of all time.

== Production ==
=== Background ===
Halloween Havoc was an annual professional wrestling pay-per-view event produced by World Championship Wrestling (WCW) since 1989. As the name implies, it was a Halloween-themed show held in October. The 1998 event was the 10th event in the Halloween Havoc chronology and it took place on October 25, 1998, from the MGM Grand Garden Arena in the Las Vegas suburb of Paradise, Nevada for the third consecutive year.

=== Storylines ===
The event featured professional wrestling matches that involve different wrestlers from pre-existing scripted feuds and storylines. Professional wrestlers portray villains, heroes, or less distinguishable characters in the scripted events that build tension and culminate in a wrestling match or series of matches.

== Event ==
Other on-screen personnel
Role:	Name:
Commentators	Tony Schiavone
Commentators	Bobby Heenan
Commentators	Mike Tenay
Interviewer	Gene Okerlund
Ring announcers	David Penzer
Ring announcers	Michael Buffer
Referees	Scott Dickinson
Referees	Mickie Jay
Referees	Nick Patrick
Referees	Charles Robinson
Referees	Billy Silverman

Buff Bagwell turned on Rick Steiner during the match, leaving him to win the title on his own. Scott Steiner was a substitute for Scott Hall, the other half of the tag team champions who was wrestling later that night. During the singles match between The Steiner Brothers, Bagwell (wearing a mask) interfered with Stevie Ray's Slapjack, but Rick was still able to defeat Scott. Kevin Nash was counted out after he hit two Jackknife Powerbombs on Scott Hall and left the ring. Bret Hart beat Sting via knockout when he put an unconscious Sting in the Sharpshooter. Hollywood Hogan pinned Warrior after Horace Hogan came out and hit Warrior over the head with a steel chair. In many areas, the pay-per-view feed was cut off after this match, so for those areas, this was the last match which aired on pay-per-view. Goldberg pinned Diamond Dallas Page after a Jackhammer. This match was also shown free the next night on Nitro, due to the pay-per-view feed cutting out in many areas.

== Reception ==
The event has received mixed reviews from critics.

The card is infamous for featuring a widely pilloried rematch of the main event of WrestleMania VI, a 1990 pay-per-view event produced by WCW's rival the World Wrestling Federation (WWF, now WWE) in which The Ultimate Warrior had defeated Hulk Hogan for the WWF Championship. Their 1998 return bout is regarded by critics as one of the worst matches of all time. Wade Keller of the Pro Wrestling Torch gave the bout his lowest "dud" rating, lamented the "poor in-ring action" and lack of crowd response, and declared that Hogan and Warrior "don't have it anymore". Wrestling Observer Newsletter editor Dave Meltzer awarded it a minimum score of minus five stars out of five (the single lowest ever for a WCW match), and readers of the publication voted it the worst match of the year. Readers of professional wrestling magazine Power Slam cast the same vote; editor Fin Martin later called it "one of the worst matches ever held." The Standard-Times dubbed it "the worst match of the decade".

Then-WCW announcer Gene Okerlund described the contest as a "disaster". Comparing the WrestleMania VI and Halloween Havoc 1998 bouts, Warrior stated, "It's weird that my best match ever was with Hogan, and at the same time my worst match ever was with Hogan". Hogan felt the contest was ruined by his botching a spot he himself devised, in which he was supposed to throw fire at Warrior; Hogan instead lit the flash paper in his own face and legit burnt his mustache and eyebrows. This led to an improvised ending in which Hogan's nephew, Horace, hit Warrior with what Sports Illustrated writer Luke Winkie called "the most unsatisfying chair shot in history". Winkie also observed a lack of co-operation between the two combatants, who did not get along personally, and slammed the contest as a "passive-aggressive wankfest". Hogan unequivocally said of the censured bout, "It was my fault."

Former WCW president Eric Bischoff conceded critical opinion that Hogan vs. Warrior II was one of the worst matches in history, and admitted that it "pretty much stunk up the joint." He however dismissed the notion that he had hired Warrior solely to lose to Hogan in return for Hogan's WrestleMania VI loss, claiming that this is "not true" and that those who hold this belief are "drinking their own Kool-Aid". WrestleCrap journalist Art O'Donnell and Fin Martin of Power Slam disputed Bischoff's claims, the latter writing that WCW "hired Warrior at great expense in May 1998 specifically to massage the Hogan ego." Warrior himself commented, "They used [Ted] Turner's check book to buy me to come back to lose a match to Hulk [Hogan]...it was repulsive, to me, when I finally realized it. And if I would have known I never would have went back for all the money that they gave me."

In 2011, Jack Bramma of 411Mania gave the event a rating of 6.0 [Average], stating, "So right off the bat, I can't include any sort of assessment or rating of the 3 matches I didn't see. That being said, you've got a standard WCW show for the time. Most non-main event guys bring their working boots even though they get little to no character time or TV time and the nWo despite ruling the universe and having several interviews lay a giant turd in their matches. There's enough good here to make this worth your time, but just barely."

In 2021, Lance Augustine of TJR Wrestling gave the event a rating of 5/10, stating, "I was going to go a little higher than this, but Hogan vs. Warrior was really terrible. I thought there were a lot of good moments on the show too. Goldberg vs. Page was the first main event on a WCW show in a while where I didn't want to be run over by a car after watching it. I thought Disco had two good showings in his matches, and I was a big fan of the opening match between Raven and Jericho. This was a good show, but it was bogged down by egos and guys not willing to step out of the limelight. It's going to keep me up at night thinking about Hogan lighting that flash paper."

In 2022, Paul Matthews of Classic Wrestling Review described the event as "a failure," stating, "The Hogan/Warrior match is a stain on this PPV. Outside of it, most of the show ranged from decent to pretty good. However, it's hard to consider this show anything other than a failure. WCW's poor time management killed this event. They had to give refunds to angry viewers. This is a company in crisis. They lost all their momentum and it's downhill from here."

== Feed termination during main event ==
WCW ran Halloween Havoc 1998 to three-and-a-half hours, rather than the standard three; due to this, many PPV feeds ended while the main event, Goldberg vs. Diamond Dallas Page, was still underway. WCW aired the match the following night on the TNT show Nitro. WWE journalist Kevin Powers hailed the bout as the best ever held at a Halloween Havoc event, while criticizing Hogan vs. Warrior. He wrote, "It's hard to believe that thousands of pay-per-view customers missed the main event of Halloween Havoc 1998 because WCW ran out of broadcast time. By some cruel twist of fate, fans did get to watch the disastrous WrestleMania VI rematch between The Ultimate Warrior and Hollywood Hogan, only to see their screens go black just as Diamond Dallas Page prepared to lock up with undefeated WCW World Heavyweight Champion Goldberg in what was the best match in the October event's 11-year span." Luke Winkie of Sports Illustrated said of Goldberg vs. Page, "It's a great match...if more TVs carried this match maybe the Warrior/Hogan disaster would be less remembered. WCW was forced to reimburse millions of dollars to customers who ordered Halloween Havoc." The match was shown the next night on Nitro. However this showing was edited out of that particular show on the WWE Network.

== Results ==
No.	Results	Stipulations	Times
1	Chris Jericho (c) defeated Raven by submission	Singles match for the WCW World Television Championship	07:50
2	Wrath defeated Meng	Singles match	04:23
3	Disco Inferno defeated Juventud Guerrera	Singles match	09:39
4	Alex Wright defeated Fit Finlay	Singles match	05:09
5	Saturn defeated Lodi	Singles match	03:50
6	Billy Kidman (c) defeated Disco Inferno	Singles match for the WCW Cruiserweight Championship	10:49
7	Rick Steiner and Buff Bagwell defeated Scott Steiner and The Giant (c)	Tag team match for the WCW World Tag Team Championship	08:24
8	Rick Steiner defeated Scott Steiner	No Disqualification match	05:10
9	Scott Hall defeated Kevin Nash by countout	Singles match	14:19
10	Bret Hart (c) defeated Sting	Singles match for the WCW United States Heavyweight Championship	15:05
11	Hollywood Hogan defeated The Warrior	Singles match	14:18
12	Goldberg (c) defeated Diamond Dallas Page	Singles match for the WCW World Heavyweight Championship	10:29
(c) / – the champion(s) heading into the match
