= Fall Brawl (1999) =

1999 World Championship Wrestling pay-per-view

- VHS cover featuring Diamond Dallas Page, Sid Vicious, Lex Luger, Sting, and Hulk Hogan
- Promotion: World Championship Wrestling
- Date: September 12, 1999
- City: Winston-Salem, North Carolina
- Venue: Lawrence Joel Veterans Memorial Coliseum
- Attendance: 7,491
- Buy rate: 130,000
- Tagline: Sting & Hogan Brawl For It All!

Pay-per-view chronology
← Previous; Road Wild	Next → Halloween Havoc

Fall Brawl chronology
← Previous; 1998	Next → 2000

The 1999 Fall Brawl was the seventh Fall Brawl professional wrestling pay-per-view (PPV) event produced by World Championship Wrestling (WCW). It took place on September 12, 1999 from the Lawrence Joel Veterans Memorial Coliseum in Winston-Salem, North Carolina.

Nine matches were contested at the event. In the main event, Sting defeated Hulk Hogan to win the WCW World Heavyweight Championship. In other prominent matches, Goldberg defeated Diamond Dallas Page, Sid Vicious defeated Chris Benoit to win the WCW United States Heavyweight Championship, and Harlem Heat (Booker T and Stevie Ray) defeated The West Texas Rednecks (Barry Windham and Kendall Windham) to win the WCW World Tag Team Championship.

== Production ==
=== Background ===
The WarGames match was created when Dusty Rhodes was inspired by a viewing of Mad Max Beyond Thunderdome. It was originally used as a specialty match for the Four Horsemen. The first WarGames match took place at The Omni in Atlanta during the NWA's Great American Bash '87 tour, where it was known as War Games: The Match Beyond. It became a traditional Fall Brawl event from 1993 to 1998. This was the first Fall Brawl not to have a War Games Match.

=== Storylines ===
The event featured professional wrestling matches that involve different wrestlers from pre-existing scripted feuds and storylines. Professional wrestlers portray villains, heroes, or less distinguishable characters in the scripted events that build tension and culminate in a wrestling match or series of matches.

== Event ==
Other on-screen personnel
Role:	Name:
Commentators	Tony Schiavone
Commentators	Bobby Heenan
Commentators	Mike Tenay
Interviewer	Gene Okerlund
Ring announcers	Michael Buffer
Ring announcers	David Penzer
Referees	Scott Dickinson
Referees	Mickie Jay
Referees	Nick Patrick
Referees	Charles Robinson
Referees	Billy Silverman

Berlyn was originally supposed to face Buff Bagwell, but the storyline was that Bagwell was late in arriving. In reality, Bagwell had refused to lose the match. Instead Berlyn wrestled against Jim Duggan. In the main event Sting put an unconscious Hulk Hogan in the Scorpion Deathlock after knocking him out with a baseball bat and Hogan failed to respond to his arm being raised three times by referee Charles Robinson. The outcome of the match played out due to large amounts of interference. Diamond Dallas Page was the first to interfere, attacking referee Nick Patrick and then hit the Diamond Cutter on Hogan. After Hogan kicked out Page attacked Patrick with the Diamond Cutter and took him out of the match. Bret Hart then came out to attack Page while Hogan forced Sting to the outside. Sid Vicious entered the ring to attack Hogan but was quickly taken out with the Big Boot. Hogan then intercepted a bat-wielding Lex Luger as he tried to interfere; Sting then took the bat after Luger had dropped it and assaulted Hogan with it. After the match, Sting and Luger celebrated in the middle of the ring.

== Reception ==
In 2007, Arnold Furious of 411Mania gave the event a rating of 2.0 [Very Bad], stating, "In terms of delivering tonight’s matches went 0 for 9. That has to be worth some sort of special mention. Hey, you’ll never believe how awful the WCW PPV was! This one is to be avoided at all costs. There’s nothing to redeem it."

== Results ==
No.	Results	Stipulations	Times
1	The Filthy Animals (Rey Misterio Jr., Eddy Guerrero and Billy Kidman) defeated Vampiro and Insane Clown Posse (Violent J and Shaggy 2 Dope)	Six-man tag team match	14:14
2	Lenny Lane (c) (with Lodi) defeated Kaz Hayashi	Singles match for the WCW Cruiserweight Championship	12:10
3	The First Family (Hugh Morrus and Brian Knobbs) (with Jimmy Hart) defeated The Revolution (Dean Malenko and Shane Douglas)	No Disqualification match	09:26
4	Rick Steiner (c) defeated Perry Saturn	Singles match for the WCW World Television Championship	09:23
5	Berlyn (with The Wall) defeated Jim Duggan	Singles match	07:58
6	Harlem Heat (Booker T and Stevie Ray) defeated The West Texas Rednecks (Barry Windham and Kendall Windham) (c) (with Curt Hennig)	Tag team match for the WCW World Tag Team Championship	13:07
7	Sid Vicious defeated Chris Benoit (c)	Singles match for the WCW United States Heavyweight Championship	11:48
8	Goldberg defeated Diamond Dallas Page	Singles match	09:04
9	Sting defeated Hulk Hogan (c)	Singles match for the WCW World Heavyweight Championship	12:24
(c) / – the champion(s) heading into the match
