= Fall Brawl '96: War Games =

1996 World Championship Wrestling pay-per-view event

- VHS cover featuring Ric Flair and Hollywood Hogan
- Promotion: World Championship Wrestling
- Date: September 15, 1996
- City: Winston-Salem, North Carolina
- Venue: Lawrence Joel Veterans Memorial Coliseum
- Attendance: 11,300
- Buy rate: 230,000
- Tagline: Wanna Play with the Big Boys?... In a Cage?...

Pay-per-view chronology
← Previous; Hog Wild	Next → Halloween Havoc

Fall Brawl chronology
← Previous; 1995	Next → 1997

Fall Brawl '96: War Games was the fourth Fall Brawl professional wrestling pay-per-view (PPV) event produced by World Championship Wrestling (WCW). It took place on September 15, 1996 from the Lawrence Joel Veterans Memorial Coliseum in Winston-Salem, North Carolina.

This was Mean Gene Okerlund's last WCW appearance until November 1996 due to his contract expiring and took time off.

== Production ==
=== Background ===
The WarGames match was created when Dusty Rhodes was inspired by a viewing of Mad Max Beyond Thunderdome. It was originally used as a specialty match for the Four Horsemen. The first WarGames match took place at The Omni in Atlanta during the NWA's Great American Bash '87 tour, where it was known as War Games: The Match Beyond. It became a traditional Fall Brawl event from 1993 to 1998.

=== Storylines ===
The event featured professional wrestling matches that involve different wrestlers from pre-existing scripted feuds and storylines. Professional wrestlers portray villains, heroes, or less distinguishable characters in the scripted events that build tension and culminate in a wrestling match or series of matches.

== Event ==
Other on-screen personnel
Role:	Name:
Commentators	Tony Schiavone
Commentators	Bobby Heenan
Commentators	Dusty Rhodes
Commentators	Mike Tenay
Interviewer	Mike Tenay
Ring announcers	David Penzer
Ring announcers	Michael Buffer
Referees	Randy Anderson
Referees	Mark Curtis
Referees	Nick Patrick

Hollywood Hogan came to ringside late in the match between Randy Savage and the Giant, right after Savage had hit a flying elbow on Giant. Savage left the ring to chase Hogan, then was attacked by Scott Hall and Kevin Nash, who knocked Savage out with a chair. Referee Nick Patrick was arguing with Giant while this all was going on and didn't see anything, and Giant pinned the fallen Savage after the rest of the nWo carried him back to the ring. Due to the tension caused by the nWo's presence in WCW, a modification to the traditional WarGames Match rules was made. Instead of both teams coming to ringside before the match, each side stayed backstage and the participants entered from there one at a time. nWo Sting and Hogan forced Lex Luger to submit as nWo Sting had the Scorpion Deathlock locked in and Hogan held him down with a front facelock. Due to Team WCW doubting his allegiance, Sting abandoned Luger, Ric Flair and Arn Anderson shortly after entering and the match became a 4-on-3 handicap match. After the match Randy Savage came out to attack Hogan, only to be beaten down by the entire nWo. Miss Elizabeth was spray painted after she came down to plead with Hogan to stop.

== Results ==
No.	Results	Stipulations	Times
1	Diamond Dallas Page defeated Chavo Guerrero Jr.	Singles match	13:07
2	Ice Train (with Teddy Long) defeated Scott Norton	Submission match	07:08
3	Konnan (c) (with Jimmy Hart) defeated Juventud Guerrera	Singles match for the AAA Heavyweight Championship	13:45
4	Chris Benoit defeated Chris Jericho	Singles match	14:36
5	Rey Misterio Jr. (c) defeated Super Caló	Singles match for the WCW Cruiserweight Championship	15:47
6	Harlem Heat (Booker T and Stevie Ray) (c) (with Sister Sherri and Col. Robert Parker) defeated The Nasty Boys (Brian Knobbs and Jerry Sags)	Tag team match for the WCW World Tag Team Championship	15:31
7	The Giant defeated Randy Savage	Singles match	07:47
8	nWo (Hollywood Hogan, Scott Hall, Kevin Nash and nWo Sting) (with Ted DiBiase) defeated Team WCW (Lex Luger, Ric Flair, Arn Anderson and Sting)	WarGames match	18:15
(c) / – the champion(s) heading into the match
