= Fall Brawl '97: War Games =

1997 World Championship Wrestling pay-per-view event

- Promotional poster featuring The Giant and Scott Hall
- Promotion: World Championship Wrestling
- Date: September 14, 1997
- City: Winston-Salem, North Carolina
- Venue: Lawrence Joel Veterans Memorial Coliseum
- Attendance: 11,939
- Buy rate: 195,000
- Tagline: The Rage in the Cage

Pay-per-view chronology
← Previous; Road Wild	Next → Halloween Havoc

Fall Brawl chronology
← Previous; 1996	Next → 1998

Fall Brawl '97: War Games was the fifth Fall Brawl professional wrestling pay-per-view (PPV) event produced by World Championship Wrestling (WCW). It took place on September 14, 1997, from the Lawrence Joel Veterans Memorial Coliseum in Winston-Salem, North Carolina.

== Production ==
=== Background ===
The WarGames match was created when Dusty Rhodes was inspired by a viewing of Mad Max Beyond Thunderdome. It was originally used as a specialty match for the Four Horsemen. The first WarGames match took place at The Omni in Atlanta during the NWA's Great American Bash '87 tour, where it was known as War Games: The Match Beyond. It became a traditional Fall Brawl event from 1993 to 1998.

=== Storylines ===
The event featured professional wrestling matches that involve different wrestlers from pre-existing scripted feuds and storylines. Professional wrestlers portray villains, heroes, or less distinguishable characters in the scripted events that build tension and culminate in a wrestling match or series of matches.

== Event ==
Other on-screen personnel
Role:	Name:
Commentators	Tony Schiavone
Commentators	Bobby Heenan
Commentators	Mike Tenay
Commentators	Larry Zbyszko
Interviewer	Gene Okerlund
Ring announcers	Michael Buffer
Ring announcers	David Penzer
Referees	Randy Anderson
Referees	Mark Curtis
Referees	Scott Dickinson
Referees	Mickie Jay
Referees	Nick Patrick

During the WarGames Match, Curt Hennig entered the match for the Horsemen last due to an apparent shoulder injury. Moments later Hennig revealed his injury to be a ruse and that he was on the nWo's side all along. The New World Order then handcuffed Chris Benoit and Steve McMichael to the cage and began assaulting Ric Flair. Kevin Nash took the microphone and repeatedly asked the helpless Horsemen if they wanted to give up, but McMichael refused and Benoit repeatedly spat in Nash's face. The Horsemen finally surrendered after Nash threatened to slam Flair's head into the cage structure with the door. McMichael, not wanting to see Flair beat up any worse than he already was, made the call for his team. After the surrender, Hennig slammed the door onto Flair's head anyways.

A Steve McMichael vs. Konnan match had been advertised on WCW.com and in the event program, though never on television. Both participated in the War Games main event, but a singles match between the two did not take place.

== Results ==
No.	Results	Stipulations	Times
1	Eddie Guerrero defeated Chris Jericho (c)	Singles match for the WCW Cruiserweight Championship	17:19
2	The Steiner Brothers (Rick Steiner and Scott Steiner) (with Ted DiBiase) defeated Harlem Heat (Booker T and Stevie Ray) (with Miss Jacqueline)	Tag Team match	11:44
3	Alex Wright (c) defeated Último Dragón	Singles match for the WCW World Television Championship	18:43
4	Jeff Jarrett (with Debra) defeated Dean Malenko	Singles match	14:53
5	Wrath and Mortis (with James Vandenberg) defeated The Faces of Fear (Meng and The Barbarian)	Tag team match	12:22
6	The Giant defeated Scott Norton	Singles match	05:27
7	Diamond Dallas Page and Lex Luger defeated nWo (Randy Savage and Scott Hall) (with Miss Elizabeth)	No Disqualification match	10:19
8	The nWo (Buff Bagwell, Kevin Nash, Konnan and Syxx) defeated The Four Horsemen (Chris Benoit, Curt Hennig, Ric Flair and Steve McMichael)	WarGames match	19:38
(c) / – the champion(s) heading into the match
