= Dancing Fools =

Professional wrestling tag team

Tag team
- Members: Disco Inferno; Alex Wright; Tokyo Magnum (associated member)
- Name(s): Dancing Fools; Boogie Knights; Dancing Idiots
- Billed heights: Disco: 6 ft 0 in (1.83 m); Wright: 6 ft 3 in (1.91 m)
- Combined billed weight: 452 lb (205 kg; 32.3 st)
- Debut: 1998
- Disbanded: 2001

The Dancing Fools were a professional wrestling tag team in World Championship Wrestling (WCW) composed of Disco Inferno and Alex Wright. They were also called the Dancing Idiots and Boogie Knights when the pair reunited later on.

== History ==
=== The Dancing Fools ===
Disco Inferno and Alex Wright were two wrestlers in World Championship Wrestling that liked to dance before and after (and sometimes during) their matches. They were feuding with each other in 1998 and decided to form a tag team called "The Dancing Fools". Tokyo Magnum, a Japanese wrestler new to WCW, wanted to join the Fools and would appear dancing behind them (without their knowledge) during their entrance. At Road Wild, the angle came to a head when his interference on behalf of The Dancing Fools backfired in a tag team match between The Fools and The Public Enemy. Two nights later on the August 10 edition of Nitro, Magnum was told by Wright and Disco that if he wanted to be a member, he needed to impress them in a match against Eddy Guererro. He lost the match in under two minutes and he later left WCW. Both Wright and Disco then mainly feuded with The Public Enemy, but usually found themselves on the receiving end of various maneuvers involving tables. They split up in the fall to wrestle individually in the cruiserweight division. Because the team consisted of a German (Wright), a Japanese man (Tokyo Magnum), and an Italian-American (Disco Inferno), popular WCW fan site DDTDigest.com referred to the team as the "Dancin' Axis powers".

=== Reunion, World Tag Team Champions and split ===
Disco and Wright reunited in 2000 as the "Boogie Knights". However, the reunion was short-lived due to Disco suffering a shoulder injury during a feud with The Natural Born Thrillers. To substitute for Disco, Wright picked General Rection as his temporary tag team partner and they both would go on to win the World Tag Team Championship (although Rection's reign with the title was credited to Disco) during a tour in Wright's home country of Germany. Wright then chose Elix Skipper as another substitute for Disco in a title defense on the November 20 edition of Nitro, but Wright and Skipper lost the titles to the Perfect Event. The team then separated as both wanted to attempt singles careers once again.

== Championships and accomplishments ==
- World Championship Wrestling

- WCW World Tag Team Championship (1 time)

== See also ==
- Filthy Animals
- New Blood (professional wrestling)
- Mamalukes
