= Ice Train (wrestler) =

American professional wrestler (1965–2024)

- Ice Train, circa the mid 1990s

Personal information
- Born: Harold Fitzgerald Hogue; November 13, 1965 Atlanta, Georgia, U.S.
- Died: January 23, 2024 (aged 58) Atlanta, Georgia, U.S.

Professional wrestling career
- Ring name(s): Ice Train; M. I. Smooth
- Billed height: 6 ft 2 in (188 cm)
- Billed weight: 315 lb (143 kg)
- Billed from: Detroit, Michigan; Atlanta, Georgia
- Trained by: DeWayne Bruce; Paul Orndorff
- Debut: 1990
- Retired: 2001

Harold Fitzgerald Hogue (November 13, 1965 – January 23, 2024) was an American professional wrestler. He is best known for his tenure with World Championship Wrestling, where he wrestled under the ring names Ice Train and M. I. Smooth.

== Professional wrestling career ==
=== World Championship Wrestling (1993–1994) ===
On the July 7, 1993, edition of WorldWide, Hogue made his World Championship Wrestling debut under the ring name Ice Train by winning a handicap match. He later made his pay-per-view debut at the first Fall Brawl event, where he defeated Shanghai Pierce. Hogue then teamed up with The Shockmaster and Charlie Norris and defeated Harlem Heat and The Equalizer at Halloween Havoc. Hogue's undefeated streak ended when he lost to Ron Simmons (in storyline his former mentor who had turned heel on him) at Clash of the Champions on January 27, 1994.

=== Catch Wrestling Association (1994–1996) ===
Hogue wrestled for the Catch Wrestling Association from 1994 to 1995, and again in 1996. He won the Catch Cup 1995 tournament by defeating John Hawk in the final.

=== Return to World Championship Wrestling (1996–1997) ===
==== Fire and Ice (1996) ====
After being absent from WCW for the rest of 1994 and all of 1995, Hogue returned to WCW on the February 14, 1996 edition of Saturday Night in a match against Scott Norton. The match ended in a double countout when both men clotheslined each other, knocking themselves out in the process. After the match, the two shook hands and Norton declared to announcer Gene Okerlund that he and Ice Train would become a formidable tag team because of their similar in-ring styles. The team was quickly named Fire and Ice with Norton representing "Fire" and Ice Train eponymously representing "Ice". The team defeated numerous teams as they tried to establish themselves as a legitimate contender for the World Tag Team Championship. At Slamboree: Lord of the Ring, Ice Train and Norton were "randomly selected" to be on the same team and they defeated the makeshift team of "Big" Bubba Rogers and Stevie Ray in the first round of the Lethal Lottery tournament. After winning their match, both Ice Train and Norton advanced to the final round and competed in an eight-man battle royal, but neither was successful as Diamond Dallas Page eliminated both men and went on to win the Lethal Lottery tournament, earning a title shot in the process.

Soon afterward, Fire and Ice began feuding with Norton's longtime rivals, The Steiner Brothers. After wrestling to a double countout on two separate occasions, the two teams faced off at the Great American Bash on June 16 to determine who would become the number one contenders to the WCW World Tag Team Championship. Scott Steiner pinned Norton after a Frankensteiner to earn the win for his team as well as the number one contendership. After the loss, Fire and Ice continued feuding with the Steiners. After a loss to The Rock 'n' Roll Express on an episode of Main Event before Bash at the Beach, dissension started to appear between Fire and Ice as Norton attacked Ice Train after another team loss. The team split when Norton faced and defeated Ice Train at Hog Wild on August 10 in a submission match after Norton made Ice Train submit to an armbar. However, Ice Train defeated Norton in a submission rematch on September 15 at Fall Brawl, when Norton submitted to a full nelson.

==== Singles competition (1996–1997) ====
After the split of Fire and Ice, Ice Train returned to singles competition in a loss to Diamond Dallas Page on the November 4, 1996 edition of Nitro and lost a rematch to Page on the following week's edition of Nitro. Ice Train then competed at World War 3, eliminating Mark Starr and Villano IV and reaching the final ten, but he was eliminated from the match due to the combined efforts of Kevin Nash and Diamond Dallas Page. After World War 3, Ice Train returned to the undercard and briefly had Theodore Long as his manager. Ice Train began defeating opponents on Nitro and he soon became a mainstay on Pro. He later continued his undercard role on WorldWide as well as on Thunder.

=== Return to Catch Wrestling Association (1997–1998) ===
Hogue returned to the Catch Wrestling Association in 1997. He competed in the CWA Internationaler Catch Cup '98.

=== Second return to World Championship Wrestling (2000–2001) ===
In mid-2000, Hogue was again given a prominent role as he became a member of The New Blood faction, who feuded with the Millionaire's Club. Hogue was renamed "M. I. Smooth" and served as Commissioner Ernest Miller's personal limo driver. Smooth regularly appeared in segments with various members of the New Blood. In early 2001, Smooth began a minor feud with Kanyon by brawling with him. On the March 19, 2001 edition of Nitro, Kanyon defeated Smooth. However, Smooth gained revenge two days later on Thunder as he teamed up with Ernest "The Cat" Miller to defeat Kanyon and Road Warrior Animal. The feud was one of several angles left unresolved by the time of WWF's purchase of WCW. Hogue retired from wrestling shortly afterwards.

=== Return to Wrestling (2019) ===
At age 52, after 18 years of inactivity, Ice Train returned to wrestling for a one- night appearance in Hannover, Germany for European Wrestling Promotion on December 21, 2019, where he fought Dave Taylor to a no contest.

== Personal life and death ==
Hogue helped train Toney Freeman for his career in bodybuilding.

Hogue died on January 23, 2024. Diamond Dallas Page first announced his death on his Facebook page. No cause of death has been disclosed.

== Championships and accomplishments ==
- Catch Wrestling Association
  - Catch Cup (1995)
- Pro Wrestling Illustrated
  - PWI ranked him #221 of the best 500 singles wrestlers in the PWI 500 in 1993
