= Big Gold Belt =

Professional wrestling championship belt

A cast copy of the original Big Gold Belt first used in the National Wrestling Alliance, then World Championship Wrestling, and finally WWE (then known as the World Wrestling Federation). WWE would reintroduce the design for the World Heavyweight Championship in 2002, with later designs incorporating their logo.

The Big Gold Belt is a historic professional wrestling championship belt that has represented titles in multiple promotions throughout its history. Originally designed in 1985 by silversmith Charles Crumrine and commissioned by Jim Crockett Promotions for Ric Flair as the NWA World Heavyweight Champion, the championship belt has three large gold plates with a distinctive name plate onto which the champion's name was etched. While not the first wrestling championship belt to incorporate a name plate, it popularized the concept. The original championship belt design was known for being unbranded as it only read "World Heavyweight Wrestling Champion" and bore no initials or trademark of its owning promotion.

== History ==
=== NWA World Heavyweight Championship (1986–1991) ===
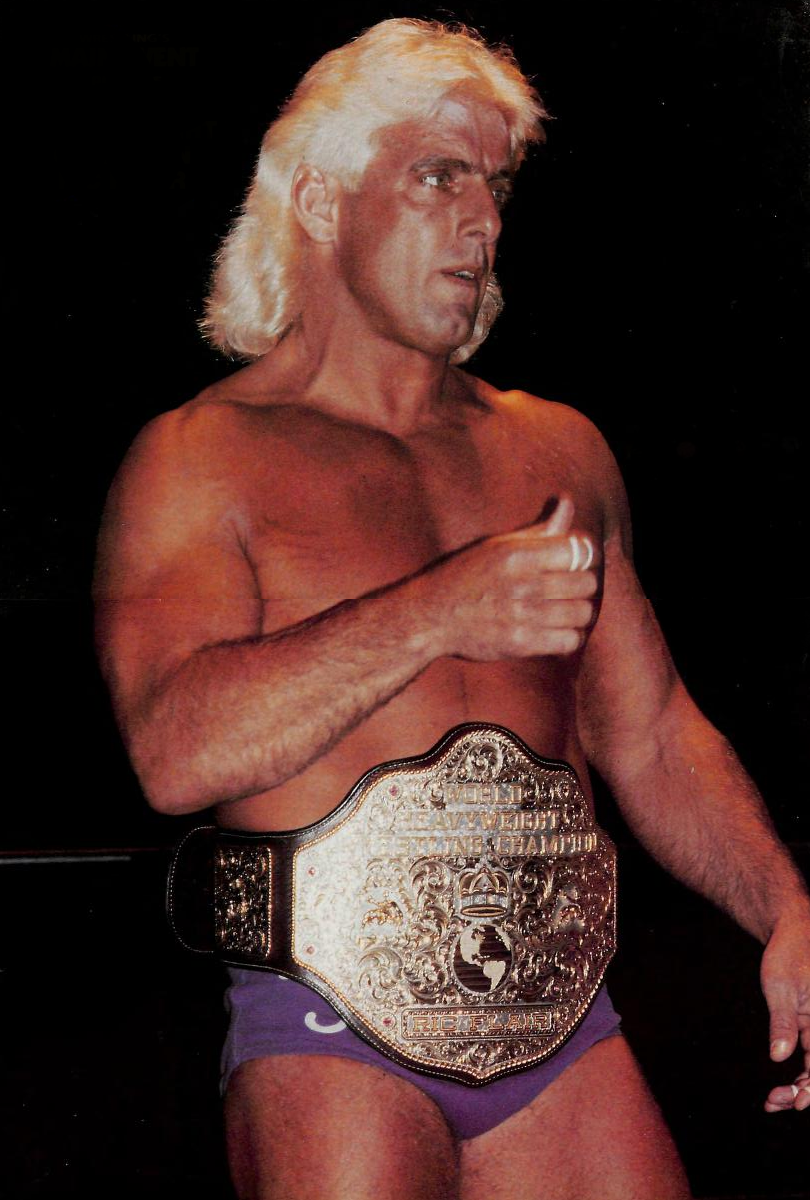
The Big Gold Belt was introduced during Ric Flair's 1986 reign

The Big Gold Belt was first introduced in 1986 to replace the NWA World Heavyweight Championship belt that had been used since 1973, historically known as the "domed globe", and nicknamed by both wrestlers and fans the "Ten Pounds of Gold". Jim Crockett Jr. of Jim Crockett Promotions (JCP) commissioned Charles Crumrine, a Reno, Nevada, silversmith specializing in rodeo-style belt buckles, to produce the new championship belt. The championship belt debuted on February 14, 1986, at a Championship Wrestling from Florida card called "Battle of the Belts II", where NWA World Heavyweight Champion Ric Flair defended the title against Barry Windham.

In 1988, the assets of JCP were purchased by media mogul Ted Turner, whose cable network TBS broadcast JCP programming. He launched the promotion World Championship Wrestling (WCW), which took its name from JCP's flagship television show, and inherited its membership in the National Wrestling Alliance (NWA), continuing to promote the NWA World Heavyweight Champion Ric Flair until 1991.

=== WCW World Heavyweight Championship (1991) ===
In January 1991, WCW officially recognized Ric Flair as their world champion in conjunction with the NWA's recognition. During this time, the Big Gold Belt represented the NWA World Heavyweight Championship as well as the newly established WCW World Heavyweight Championship. An exception to this arose in the spring of 1991. On March 21, 1991, Tatsumi Fujinami defeated Flair at the WCW/New Japan Supershow. Following this match, the NWA recognized Fujinami as their new champion; however, WCW did not recognize this title change. While Flair would defeat Fujinami at SuperBrawl I on May 19, 1991 to reunify the NWA and WCW world titles, during Fujinami's approximately two-month reign as NWA World Heavyweight Champion, Flair retained possession of the championship belt and it only represented the WCW World Heavyweight Champion.

=== "Real World's Heavyweight Championship" and NWA World Heavyweight Championship (1991–1993) ===
In July 1991, Flair and WCW parted ways while Flair was still champion. The Big Gold Belt left with Flair due to a dispute with WCW Vice President Jim Herd in which Herd refused to return Flair's $25,000 deposit, a deposit per regulations that was required of reigning NWA World Heavyweight Champions and was to be returned after the conclusion of their reigns. WCW was forced to strip Flair of their recognition of world champion and introduced a new title belt design to continue to represent the WCW World Heavyweight Championship. On September 8, two days before Flair's WWF debut, the NWA followed suit and also stripped Flair of their recognition as world champion. Flair soon signed with the World Wrestling Federation (WWF, now WWE) and exhibited the Big Gold Belt there, proclaiming himself "The Real World's Heavyweight Champion".

When the WCW sued, Flair instead used a WWF World Tag Team title belt, digitized out on television, on the (kayfabe) orders of WWF President Jack Tunney until Flair won the World Wrestling Federation Championship at the 1992 Royal Rumble, thereby unifying it with his own claim. Flair stated on the 2008 DVD release of Nature Boy Ric Flair: The Definitive Collection that the $25,000 he initially deposited with additional interest totalling $38,000 was never paid back to him, and as a result, Flair kept the Big Gold Belt until a settlement was finally reached with WCW. With its return to WCW, the Big Gold Belt represented the NWA World Heavyweight Championship once again, being awarded to Masa Chono after his August 1992 tournament final victory over Rick Rude for the vacant title in New Japan Pro-Wrestling. Meanwhile the new WCW World Heavyweight Championship belt design that had been commissioned after Flair's departure also continued to be used until 1993.

=== WCW International World Heavyweight Championship (1993–1994) ===
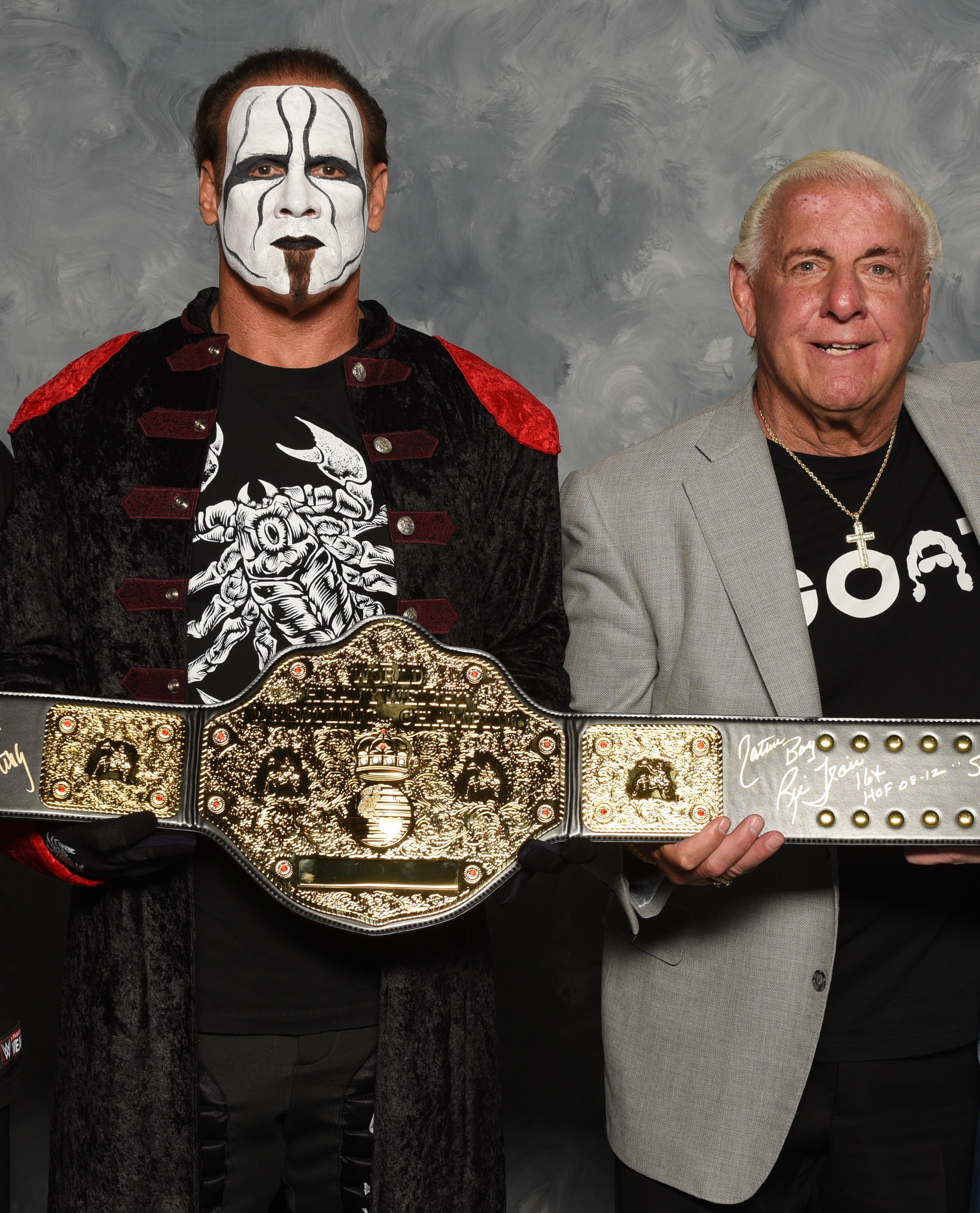
Sting and Ric Flair pose with a replica of the belt in 2017. They are the only two men to have held all three of the championships it represented in WCW.

In September 1993, WCW formally seceded from the NWA, and the promotional rights to the NWA World Heavyweight Championship were returned to the NWA. With the Big Gold Belt remaining property of WCW, Ric Flair, who had won the NWA World Heavyweight Championship in July, was recognized by WCW as holding the WCW International World Heavyweight Championship, the world championship of "WCW International" a kayfabe office of WCW that purportedly managed WCW's working relationships with foreign promotions. The WCW International World Heavyweight Championship was represented by the Big Gold Belt until June 19, 1994, when it was unified with the WCW World Heavyweight Championship.

=== WCW World Heavyweight Championship again (1994–2001) ===
The Big Gold Belt then represented the WCW World Heavyweight Championship again, remaining the top title in WCW until the end of the promotion in 2001. Upon winning the title for the second time in 1996, Hollywood Hogan spray-painted the belt with the nWo logo and afterwards wore the Big Gold Belt in that defaced condition. In 1999, the original shell cordovan strap on the belt was replaced with a black leather strap, and bronze cast copies of the original belt were made for use as substitute belts at WCW events.

=== WWF purchases WCW (2001) ===
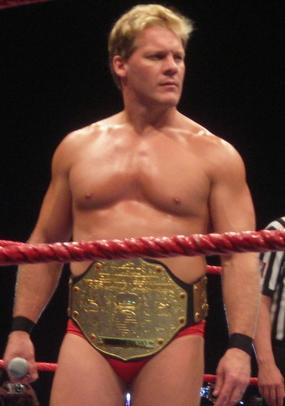
Chris Jericho held the Big Gold Belt six times in WWE over the course of a decade under three different incarnations, with two WCW Championship reigns during The Invasion, one reign with the Undisputed WWF Championship, and three reigns as World Heavyweight Champion

In March 2001, after the long and bitter rivalry of the Monday Night War, World Wrestling Federation Entertainment, Inc. bought out WCW. The Big Gold Belt became property of the WWF and continued to represent the abbreviated WCW Championship within the promotion during the period of the WCW/ECW "Invasion". After the conclusion of Invasion at the Survivor Series in November 2001, the WCW Championship being held by The Rock became known simply as the World Championship for the month that followed as the WCW name was phased out. The title was unified with the WWF Championship at Vengeance in December 2001. Chris Jericho became the final recognized titleholder and was subsequently promoted as undisputed champion in the WWF and professional wrestling.

=== Undisputed WWF Championship (2001–2002) ===
Following the unification of the World Championship (formerly WCW Championship) and WWF Championship in December 2001, the Big Gold Belt and the WWF Championship belt were collectively used to represent the Undisputed WWF Championship (those who held the championship belts after Jericho are credited as having held only the WWF Championship). After Jericho was defeated by Triple H at WrestleMania X8, the two title belts were replaced by a single Undisputed WWF Championship belt (later WWE), which was first awarded to Triple H on April 1, 2002.

=== Unbranded World Heavyweight Championship (2002–2013) ===
By 2002, the WWF had been divided in what became known as the brand extension and the promotion along with its parent company were renamed to World Wrestling Entertainment (WWE). The roster was divided into two franchises or "WWE brands", split between Raw and SmackDown!. The WWE Undisputed Champion appeared on both shows and defended against challengers from both brands. After SummerSlam in August 2002, WWE Undisputed Champion Brock Lesnar announced that he had signed an exclusive contract with SmackDown, ignoring the claim to the title's number-one contendership by Raw's Triple H. Raw General Manager Eric Bischoff said that the WWE Undisputed Championship was thus disputed, and he awarded the World Heavyweight Championship, in the form of the Big Gold Belt, to Triple H. A new version of the belt, incorporating a WWE logo for copyright purposes, was introduced in March 2003 until 2013.

=== WWE World Heavyweight Championship (2013–2014) ===
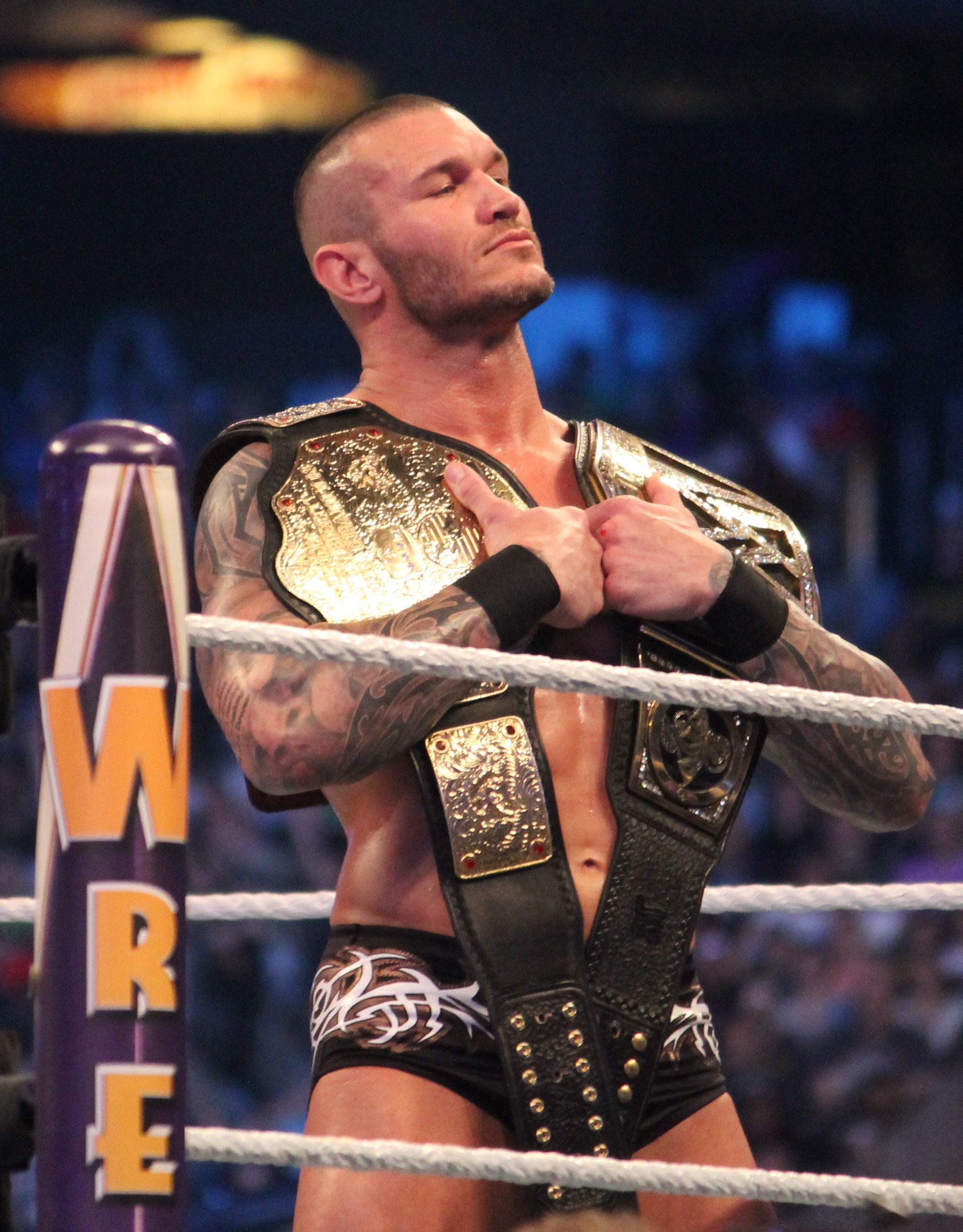
Randy Orton, a four-time World Heavyweight Champion, seen here holding the most recent version of Big Gold Belt as a component of the WWE World Heavyweight Championship

On December 15, 2013 at the TLC: Tables, Ladders & Chairs pay-per-view, the title was unified with the WWE Championship when WWE Champion Randy Orton defeated World Heavyweight Champion John Cena, and the title was officially retired. Afterwards, the Big Gold Belt was used in conjunction with the existing WWE Championship belt to represent the unified championship known as the WWE World Heavyweight Championship (the name has since reverted to the WWE Championship). However, much like how Chris Jericho carried both physical title belts as Undisputed WWF Champion, the title history for the World Heavyweight Championship was retired as this lineage follows that of WWE's original world title. On the August 18, 2014, episode of Raw, a single, redesigned WWE Championship belt was presented to then-champion Brock Lesnar, and the Big Gold Belt was permanently retired.

== Legacy ==
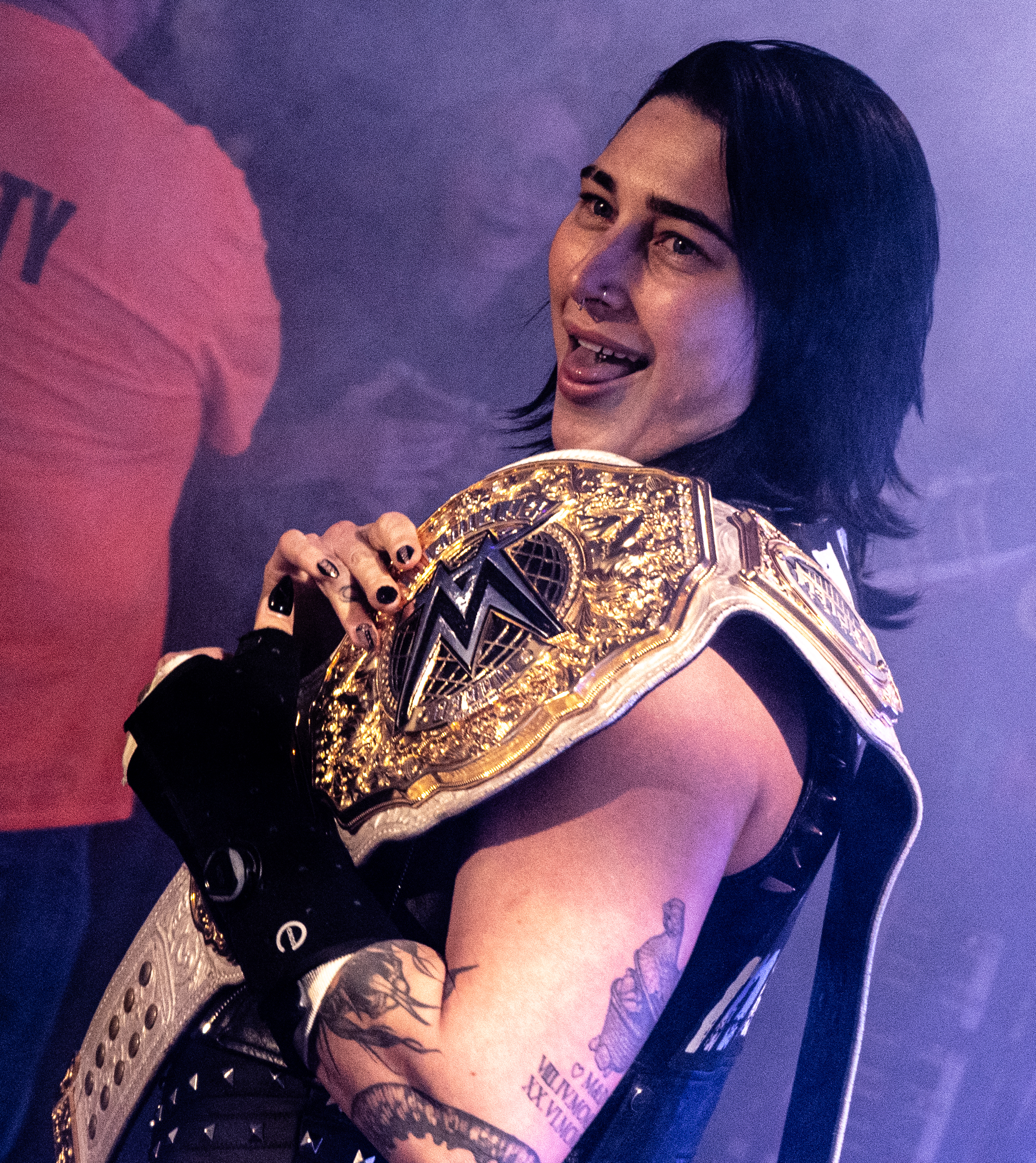
Rhea Ripley with the Women's World Championship, whose design was inspired by the Big Gold Belt

In 2023, WWE unveiled a new World Heavyweight Championship that is represented by an all-new belt design that pays homage to the Big Gold Belt in its overall shape and use of floral scroll work. Shortly after, a new belt for the renamed Women's World Championship was also unveiled using the same design except the strap is white and the belt is an overall smaller size.

CM Punk is the first and thus far only wrestler to have won both the new and previous versions of WWE's World Heavyweight Championship.
