= Jeff Farmer (wrestler) =

American professional wrestler

Personal information
- Born: Jeffrey Farmer; August 14, 1962 (age 64) New York City, U.S.
- Family: Paul Farmer (brother)

Professional wrestling career
- Ring name(s): Lightning; The nWo Sting; Cobra; Jeff Barber; NWO Sting; Super J Jeff Farmer
- Billed height: 6 ft 3 in (1.91 m)
- Billed weight: 265 lb (120 kg)
- Billed from: Arlington County, Virginia
- Trained by: Steve Keirn; Ole Anderson; Blackjack Mulligan
- Debut: 1991
- Retired: 2020

Jeffrey Farmer (born August 14, 1962) is an American retired professional wrestler. He is best known for his appearances with World Championship Wrestling (WCW) and New Japan Pro-Wrestling (NJPW) as The nWo Sting, an impostor version of the original Sting aligned to the New World Order stable.

== Professional wrestling career ==
=== Early career (1991–1993) ===
Farmer began his professional wrestling career in late 1991, at the age of 29, performing under the ring name Lightning as part of the tag team "Thunder and Lightning" within the IWF promotion in Florida.

In August 1993, the team undertook a tour with All Japan Pro Wrestling, where they faced established teams including Dan Kroffat and Doug Furnas, Jun Akiyama and Tsuyoshi Kikuchi, as well as Mighty Inoue and Takao Omori. During their time in the promotion, they were billed as "Lightning & Thunder".

=== World Championship Wrestling (1993–1994) ===
In 1993, Thunder and Lightning were signed by World Championship Wrestling (WCW). They made their first appearance at a WCW Worldwide taping in Orlando, Florida on July 10, 1993 (in an episode that would not air until November 13 of that year), defeating Billy Brooks and Rhett Blair. Their first actual television appearance came on August 29, 1993, on WCW's The Main Event, where they upset Chris Benoit and Bobby Eaton. Thunder and Lightning's next match saw their first defeat, as they fell to Eaton and Yoshi Kwan (Chris Champion) at a house show in Kennesaw, Georgia on September 28.

Although WCW had cut back severely on house shows in Eric Bischoff's first year helming the company, they did continue to tour smaller locations to give new, younger wrestlers experience. Thunder and Lightning would wrestle on several of these events in the fall of 1993 and engaged in a house show program with Tex Slazinger and Shanghai Pierce. On the December 11, 1993 edition of WCW Saturday Night the team called out WCW World Tag Team Champions The Nasty Boys, as well as several other teams.

Thunder and Lightning entered 1994 continuing to come out victorious on television against preliminary level competition, but suffered their first loss when they were defeated on February 20, 1994, by Pretty Wonderful on The Main Event. They made their first PPV appearance at SuperBrawl IV where they lost to Harlem Heat. Their losing streak on television continued into April as they suffered defeats to Bad Attitude (Steve Keirn and Bobby Eaton) and Pretty Wonderful. Thunder and Lightning's final match however was a win; they teamed with Terry Taylor to defeat Slazinger, Pierce, and Dallas Page on WCW Pro on April 30, 1994. Farmer left WCW in the spring of 1994.

=== Independent circuit (1994–1995) ===
In July 1994, Farmer wrestled for the National Wrestling Alliance territories in Tennessee and the Carolinas. In February 1995, he and fellow former WCW wrestler Jim Steele wrestled a dark match for the World Wrestling Federation.

=== World Championship Wrestling and New Japan Pro-Wrestling (1995–2002) ===
==== Cobra (1995) ====
Farmer returned to WCW in July 1995 as Cobra to feud with Craig Pittman. Cobra made his WCW debut on September 9, 1995, edition of WCW Worldwide, defeating The Grappler with his Cobra clutch slam finisher. Bobby "The Brain" Heenan and "Mean" Gene Okerlund explained Cobra's kayfabe back story of having served in the Gulf War. Sgt. Craig Pittman, a legit Marine sergeant, abandoned Cobra in the Jungle, then reported him AWOL back at camp. Cobra lost all rank and respect, learned to wrestle, and came to WCW seeking revenge on Pittman. The feud was short-lived, with Pittman defeating Cobra by submission in a very short match, although in a rematch the following week, Cobra won. They then would go back and forth and trade victories for a few months before the feud ended.

==== nWo Sting (1996–1999) ====
The nWo had been battling Sting, one of WCW’s most loyal supporters, since its inception in July 1996. As part of an elaborate plan, Farmer made his debut as “Sting” on the September 9, 1996, edition of Monday Nitro when he attacked Lex Luger, appearing from the nWo limousine after a tape recording of Sting speaking had been played. This led Luger, Sting's longtime ally, friend and tag team partner, to publicly question Sting’s loyalty. At Fall Brawl, as Team WCW was being interviewed, Sting came in and told his teammates that he had nothing to do with the attack. Luger told Sting rather bluntly that he did not believe him. Later during the War Games match, the last man out for Team nWo was “Sting” (Farmer), leading viewers (including the broadcast team) to believe that Sting was part of the nWo. However, the real Sting showed up as the last man for Team WCW. After single-handedly taking out Team nWo, Sting walked over to Luger, shoved him, and said, "Is that good enough for ya?" and left the ring. Farmer picked up the victory in the match for Team nWo when he forced Luger to submit with the Scorpion death lock.

After the War Games match, the real Sting began to evolve into a much darker Crow-like character, with Farmer’s imposter character serving as the catalyst. Farmer, now adopting the ring name of nWo Sting, became more of a comedy act in WCW, mimicking Sting’s classic mannerisms, while dressed as the dark Sting. He would also copy the loyalty tests and began carrying a baseball bat as the real Sting did. On occasion, nWo Sting would try to appease the real Sting when both were in the ring. Unfortunately for Farmer, this usually led to the real Sting attacking him and Farmer getting laid out with the Scorpion Death Drop. In matches, nWo Sting would usually lose to opponents, or need help from the entire nWo to win. The television announcers would refer to him as imposter, fake, or bogus Sting. Announcer Larry Zbyszko nicknamed him “Stink”. The rest of the nWo would completely ignore him whenever the real Sting was around, as they were trying to recruit him. After it was revealed that Sting had sided with WCW, Eric Bischoff promised an interview with Sting. He instead brought out nWo Sting and held a mock interview that berated the real Sting and praised Hollywood Hogan.

Farmer appeared in the video game WCW vs. nWo: World Tour as nWo Sting, labeled in the game as "Sting".

In March 1997, Farmer joined nWo Japan in New Japan Pro-Wrestling and began to split his time between NJPW and WCW. While in Japan, nWo Sting began to rise in popularity and became a prominent member of nWo Japan, regularly teaming with group leader Masahiro Chono. nWo Sting became much more popular than the real Sting in Japan, and as a result, Farmer would spend more time in Japan. In November 1997, he teamed up with Hiroyoshi Tenzan to compete in the 1997 Super Grade Tag League. The team would score three victories during the league.

In May 1998, nWo Sting joined nWo Hollywood and began teaming with The Giant. The Giant had previously won the WCW World Tag Team Championship with the real Sting, but the team imploded when Giant joined nWo Hollywood, and began feuding over control of the tag team titles that they held together. On the May 25, 1998, edition of Monday Nitro, the team of nWo Sting & Giant lost to Lex Luger and Sting, which after the match saw the real Sting join the nWo as a part of the Wolfpac faction. After Farmer left, the nWo began using Sting masks and having other nWo members appear as fake Stings. He made one final appearance as fake Sting on the July 5, 1999, edition of Monday Nitro when he interfered in a match between Kevin Nash and Sid Vicious.

nWo Sting returned to Japan, where he had a run as a fan favorite. Chono, the leader of nWo Japan, suffered a neck injury which led to Keiji Mutoh taking charge and changing the group's philosophy. As a fan favorite, nWo Sting teamed up with Brian Adams to challenge for the IWGP Tag Team Championship, and also teamed up with Tenzan again to compete in the 1998 Super Grade Tag League. In May 1999, Chono returned from his injury and began feuding with Mutoh over direction of nWo Japan. During this feud, nWo Sting left the group and sided with Chono.

In 2014, WWE released a retrospective DVD collection titled "The Best of Sting". A picture of Farmer as nWo Sting was featured on the back cover of the set but it was later revealed that the picture of nWo Sting was actually a mistake on WWE's part.

==== Team 2000 & New Japan Army (1999–2002) ====
After leaving nWo Japan, Farmer changed his ring name to Super J, and along with Chono, and Michael Wallstreet formed Team 2000 to feud with nWo Japan. The two factions would fight for the next seven months before the feud culminated at the Wrestling World 2000 event. At the event, Team 2000 defeated nWo Japan in a best of four series, forcing the nWo Japan to disband and become part of Team 2000.

Super J was well received by the NJPW audience, and was also a prominent member of Team 2000, teaming with Chono through 2001. The team made an appearance in WCW on the January 17, 2000, edition of Monday Nitro defeating Rick Steiner and Mike Rotunda before its closure in March 2001. Super J teamed up with Scott Norton to compete in the 2001 G1 Tag League, scoring 7 victories. Super J left Team 2000 in March 2002, and joined rival group, the New Japan Army. The two groups feuded until September 2002 when Team 2000 was absorbed into the New Japan Army as well.

=== Return to the independent circuit (2001–2005) ===
In 2004, Farmer went back to the nWo Sting gimmick on the independent circuit in the Carolinas until he started wrestling exclusively for Ultimate Championship Wrestling on January 8, 2005, when he won the title. He retired later that year.

=== Return to wrestling (2018–2020) ===
Farmer returned to wrestling in 2018 in Japan for Wrestle-1. He also made appearances in the independents in 2019. His last match was on February 28, 2020, teaming with Keji Muto losing to Tatsumi Fujinami and Yoshiaki Fujiwara.

== Academic career ==
As of late 2010, Farmer was project manager of a research program known as GEAR (Genetics, Exercise, and Research) at the University of Miami Miller School of Medicine. The program aims to identify how "people's genetic background influences their response to physical activity."

== Personal life ==
Farmer is the brother of Paul Farmer.

== Championships and accomplishments ==
- Pro Wrestling Illustrated
  - PWI ranked him No. 130 of the 500 best singles wrestlers of the PWI 500 in 1999
- Other accomplishments
  - IWF Tag Team Championship (1 time) – with Thunder
- Ultimate Championship Wrestling
  - UCW Heavyweight Championship (1 time)
- Wrestling Observer Newsletter
  - Best Gimmick (1996) – nWo
  - Feud of the Year (1996) New World Order vs. World Championship Wrestling
