= WCW International World Heavyweight Championship =

Former professional wrestling title

- The Big Gold Belt represented the WCW International World Heavyweight Championship from 1993 to 1994.

Details
- Promotion: National Wrestling Alliance; World Championship Wrestling; New Japan Pro-Wrestling
- Brand: WCW International
- Date established: July 18, 1993
- Date retired: June 23, 1994
Statistics
- First champion: Ric Flair
- Final champion: Ric Flair
- Most reigns: Rick Rude (3)
- Longest reign: Rick Rude (178 days)
- Shortest reign: Hiroshi Hase (8 days)

The WCW International World Heavyweight Championship was a professional wrestling world heavyweight championship that was contested in World Championship Wrestling (WCW) between September 1993 and June 1994. Although it was owned and controlled by WCW, the championship was presented as the highest accolade of "WCW International", a fictitious subsidiary. The championship was contested at WCW events and at several events in Japan under the aegis of New Japan Pro-Wrestling (NJPW).

Represented by the historic Big Gold Belt, the championship originated as the world heavyweight title of the National Wrestling Alliance (NWA), an umbrella organization of wrestling promotions from which WCW withdrew in 1993. At that time, WCW was responsible for deciding which of their wrestlers would hold the NWA championship. When the NWA withdrew WCW's control of the booking of their championship, a fictitious alternative was created to promote the use of the title belt.

Over the title's history, eight title reigns were shared between four wrestlers. Rick Rude's three title reigns comprise the longest total time as champion with 202 cumulative days. Hiroshi Hase is the champion with the shortest reign of eight days; Rude holds the longest individual reign of 178 days. Ric Flair was the first and last titleholder.

== Background ==
The WCW International World Heavyweight Championship has its origins in the NWA World Heavyweight Championship, the principal championship of the National Wrestling Alliance (NWA). The NWA was a syndicate of wrestling promotions who would book an overall champion. In 1991, the NWA World Heavyweight Champion was Ric Flair, who held the title when he wrestled for WCW. Flair was simultaneously considered the WCW World Heavyweight Champion; he was stripped of both titles because he left to work for rival company World Wrestling Federation (WWF, now WWE). Lex Luger won the vacant WCW World Heavyweight Championship, which would remain the promotion's primary title throughout WCW's existence until the company's assets were bought by the WWF; Masahiro Chono won a tournament designed to crown the next holder of the NWA championship. As a result of WCW withdrawing its membership of the NWA in September 1993, the NWA World Heavyweight Championship, now once again held by Flair, no longer carried the NWA name, but WCW retained the physical belt they had used to represent the title. This belt became the WCW International World Heavyweight Championship. The NWA then appointed Eastern Championship Wrestling as the promotion in charge of booking a new NWA champion.

== Overview ==
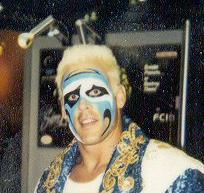
Sting held the WCW International World Heavyweight Championship on two occasions.

Ric Flair was the first WCW International World Heavyweight Champion; he had defeated Barry Windham for the NWA World Heavyweight Championship in July 1993 and held it at the point when WCW withdrew from the NWA two months later. Flair was booked by WCW to lose the championship to Rick Rude in the 1993 Fall Brawl event. After the NWA objected to this, WCW withdrew from the NWA and the title change went ahead, but with no mention of the NWA. For a brief time following WCW's withdrawal, the championship was not officially named; it was referred to as the "Big Gold Belt" until WCW management renamed it the WCW International World Heavyweight Championship. This was not intended to be the "International World Heavyweight Championship" contested by WCW, but rather the "World Heavyweight Championship" of a fictitious promotion named WCW International.

Rude engaged in a promotional tour in Japan with the championship; WCW held a partnership with Japanese promotion New Japan Pro-Wrestling (NJPW). Rude lost the championship briefly to NJPW wrestler Hiroshi Hase as part of this arrangement, regaining it after eight days to set up a loss to Sting. An angle in which Rude defeated Sting for the championship in another NJPW-organized bout was then set up. The finish was arranged to involve Rude illegally using the title belt as a weapon to score the victory, causing officials to declare the win null and void. Sting refused to accept the title without "winning" it back. This match caused a back injury to Rude, which ended his in-ring career.

At the 1994 Slamboree event, Rude had been scheduled to defend against Sting in a return match. However, due to the nature of Rude's win (and in reality because of his injury) WCW Commissioner Nick Bockwinkel declared Rude's win void and returned the title to Sting. However, Sting immediately vacated the title, claiming that the fans had come to the event to see him win the title in the ring and they deserved to see a championship match. Therefore, a match for the then-vacant championship was held later that night, in which Sting defeated Big Van Vader to begin a second title reign. The title last changed hands at the Clash of the Champions XXVII event in 1994. The angle matched Sting against Flair, who was now the WCW World Heavyweight Champion, in a championship unification match as a way of eliminate the WCW International title. Flair would win the match, unifying both championships and ending the existence of the WCW International World Heavyweight Championship. The unified title would be represented by the Big Gold Belt.

== Reigns ==
Key
No.	Overall reign number
Reign	Reign number for the specific champion
Days	Number of days held

No.	Champion	Championship change			Reign statistics		Notes	Ref.
No.	Champion	Date	Event	Location	Reign	Days	Notes	Ref.
1	Ric Flair	July 18, 1993	Beach Blast 1993	Biloxi, Mississippi	1	63	Flair defeated Barry Windham for the NWA World Heavyweight Championship. The NWA withdraws recognition on September 15, 1993, when WCW leaves the NWA. Flair continued to be recognized as "World Heavyweight Champion" by WCW. WWE does not recognize this reign as a separate reign, and it is included as one of Flair's eight NWA title reigns recognized by WWE.	
2	Rick Rude	September 19, 1993	Fall Brawl 1993	Houston, Texas	1	178	Rude was recognized as "WCW International" World Heavyweight Champion after withdrawal of WCW from NWA.	
3	Hiroshi Hase	March 16, 1994	House show	Tokyo, Japan	1	8		
4	Rick Rude	March 24, 1994	House show	Kyoto, Japan	2	24		
5	Sting	April 17, 1994	Spring Stampede 1994	Rosemont, Illinois	1	14		
—	Rick Rude	May 1, 1994	Wrestling Dontaku 1994	Fukuoka, Japan	2^{(3)}	21	Later, this victory was reversed due to use of the belt as a weapon and Rude's entire reign became unrecognized by WCW. However, Rude had already defended the title on the April 21, 1994 taping of WCW Saturday Night, which was shown via tape delay on May 14. This reign is currently recognized by WWE.	
—	Vacated	May 22, 1994	Slamboree 1994	Philadelphia, Pennsylvania	—	—	Sting was notified of the reversal at Slamboree, but refused the title, leaving it vacant.	
6	Sting	May 22, 1994	Slamboree 1994	Philadelphia, Pennsylvania	2	32	Sting defeated Big Van Vader, who replaced Rude (who suffered a career-ending injury during the May 1 match) for the held-up championship later that same night.	
7	Ric Flair	June 23, 1994	Clash of the Champions XXVII	North Charleston, South Carolina	2	<1		
—	Unified	June 23, 1994	—	—	—	—	The WCW International World Heavyweight Championship is unified with the WCW World Heavyweight Championship. The WCW International World Heavyweight Championship is retired and the lineage of the WCW World Heavyweight Championship continues and is represented by the Big Gold Belt. The belt design first used when Ric Flair left WCW in 1991 is retired.	

== Combined reigns ==
Rank	Wrestler	No. of reigns	Combined days
1	Rick Rude	3	202
2	Ric Flair	2	63
3	Sting	2	46
4	Hiroshi Hase	1	8

== Footnotes ==
=== References ===
- Hornbaker, Tim (2007). National Wrestling Alliance: The Untold Story of the Monopoly That Strangled Pro Wrestling: The Untold Story of the Monopoly That Strangled Professional Wrestling. ECW Press. ISBN 978-1550227413.
- Lawler, Jerry (2002). It's Good to be the King... Sometimes. Simon & Schuster. ISBN 0743475577.
- Reynolds, R. D.; Baer, Randy (2003). WrestleCrap: The Very Worst of Pro Wrestling. ECW Press. ISBN 1550225847.
- Shields, Brian (2010). Main Event: WWE in the Raging 80s. Simon & Schuster. ISBN 978-1451604672.

Sporting positions
Preceded by NWA World Heavyweight Championship	WCW's world championship 1993–1994	Succeeded by WCW World Heavyweight Championship
