= Gary Michael Cappetta =

American professional wrestling ring announcer

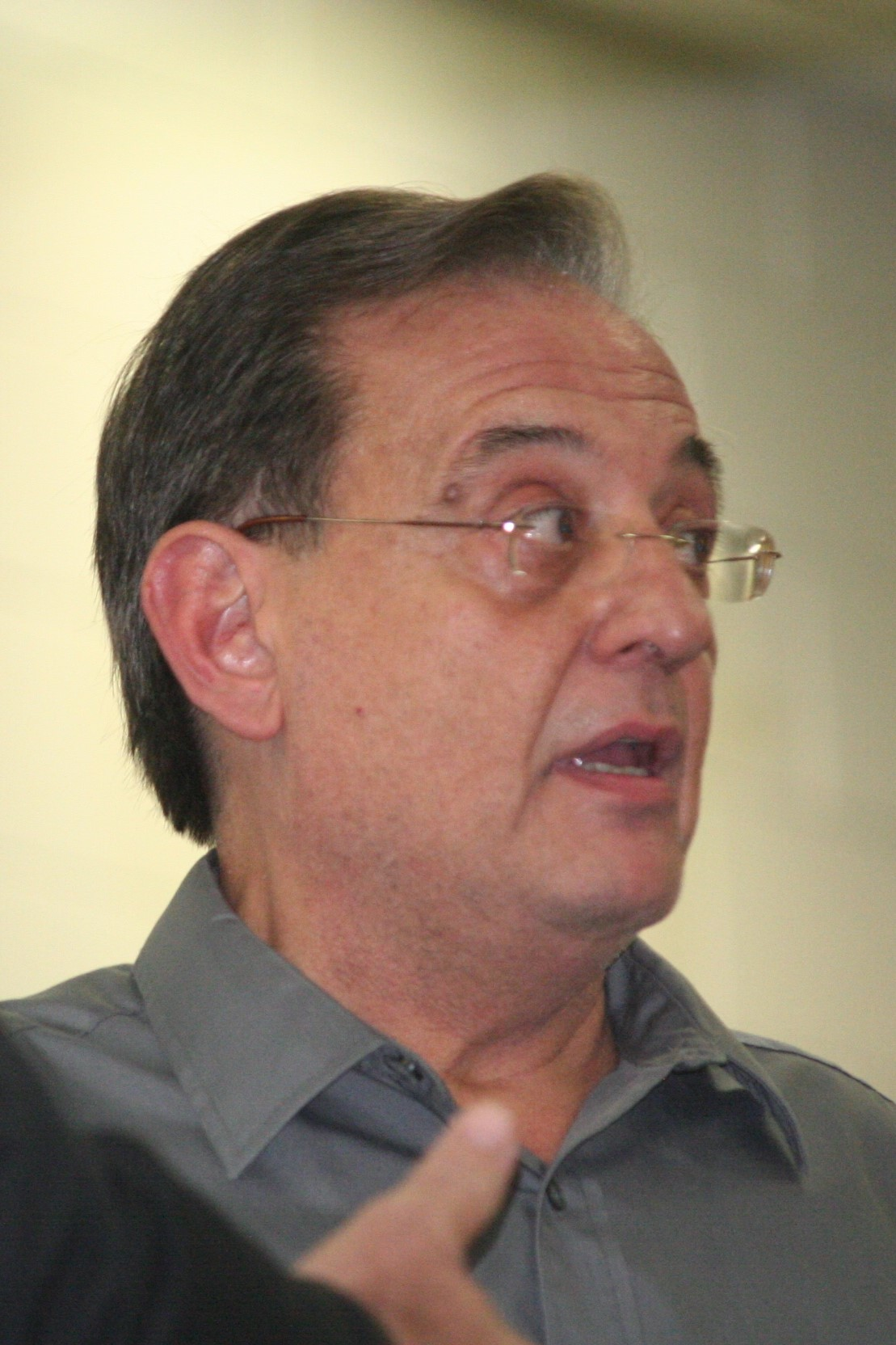
- Cappetta in 2015

Personal information
- Born: December 12, 1952 (age 73) Newark, New Jersey, U.S.

Professional wrestling career
- Ring name(s): Gary Cappetta; Gary Michael Cappetta; G.M.C.
- Billed from: Seaside Park, New Jersey
- Debut: 1974

Gary Michael Cappetta (born December 12, 1952) is an American professional wrestling ring announcer, author, voice over artist, screenwriter, stage performer, and teacher. For years, he was dubbed "The World's Most Dangerous Announcer" by longtime friend and colleague Jim Cornette. Having spent more than 20 years in the middle of the pro wrestling ring, he then wrote and self-published Bodyslams: Memoirs of a Wrestling Pitchman. The autobiography was later re-released by ECW Press in 2006, this time adding chapters that covered 10 additional years of his wrestling experience. Cappetta was the ring announcer on World Wrestling Federation broadcasts from 1974 to 1985, followed by stints with the American Wrestling Association (AWA), the National Wrestling Alliance (NWA) and World Championship Wrestling shows. He was released from WCW in May 1995 due to budget cuts. Later on, he worked backstage for Ring of Honor, doing backstage interviews for their DVD releases. He also was the ring announcer for the 2004 wrestling game Showdown: Legends of Wrestling. On the February 26, 2020 episode of AEW Dynamite, Cappetta presided over the AEW Revolution main event weigh-in as the Master of Ceremonies between AEW World Champion Chris Jericho and Jon Moxley.

Cappetta grew up in Kearny, New Jersey, where he attended Kearny High School and spent his summers in Seaside Park, New Jersey, before moving to Ocean County, New Jersey following his high school graduation.

In addition to his announcing duties, Cappetta has produced and directed commercials to promote WCW special events and was the Spanish announce voice for World Championship Wrestling programming on KCAL in Los Angeles. Cappetta has written a screenplay about the sport of wrestling entitled Fall For The Dream. Gary wrote, directed, and starred in "Bodyslams! & Beyond", a one-man stage show based on his autobiography, Bodyslams: Memoirs of a Wrestling Pitchman. Cappetta taught Spanish at Donovan Catholic aka Monsignor Donovan aka St. Joseph's High School and Christian Brothers Academy in New Jersey intermittently for years, rising to chair The World Language Department before resigning.

== Championships and accomplishments ==
- Cauliflower Alley Club
  - Jim Ross Announcer Award (2026)
- NWA Mid South Wrestling Hall of Fame
  - Class of 2017
- New England Pro Wrestling Hall of Fame
  - Class of 2019

== Bibliography ==
- Ettkin, Brian (2004). "Get this: The Animal is a good guy." Albany Times Union. May 8.
- Gramarrosa, Andrew (2001). "Wrestling pitchman pins insider's look at sport." South Bend Tribune. July 15.
- Russo, Ric (2000). "Circling the Square." Orlando Sentinel. October 13.
