= Starrcade (1997) =

1997 World Championship Wrestling pay-per-view event

- Promotional poster featuring Hollywood Hogan and Sting
- Promotion: World Championship Wrestling
- Date: December 28, 1997
- City: Washington, D.C.
- Venue: MCI Center
- Attendance: 17,500
- Buy rate: 700,000
- Tagline(s): Hogan's a colorful guy... but his nightmare's black 'n white. Paybacks Are Hell!

Pay-per-view chronology
← Previous; World War 3	Next → Souled Out

Starrcade chronology
← Previous; 1996	Next → 1998

The 1997 Starrcade was the 15th annual Starrcade professional wrestling pay-per-view (PPV) event produced by World Championship Wrestling (WCW). It was held on December 28, 1997, at the MCI Center in Washington, D.C.

The matches revolved around the ongoing storyline between WCW and the New World Order (nWo) organization. The main event was between Hollywood Hogan and Sting for the WCW World Heavyweight Championship, with Hogan representing the nWo and Sting representing WCW. The match culminated a year-long buildup of their feud. The match ended in controversy over the referee's pinfall count, and their feud continued after the event surrounding this. Other matches included Larry Zbyszko and Eric Bischoff for the control of WCW Monday Nitro, and Curt Hennig and Diamond Dallas Page for the WCW United States Heavyweight Championship.

Starrcade became the highest-grossing pay-per-view in WCW history. Despite its success, the main event was seen by critics and journalists as the beginning of WCW's downfall due to setting a tone for backstage dissension and what would retrospectively be seen as poor creative decisions going forward.

== Storylines ==
Hollywood Hogan, the WCW World Heavyweight Champion, before his match at Starrcade

The event consisted of matches resulting from scripted feuds and storylines. Wrestlers portrayed villains, heroes, or less distinguishable characters to build tension and culminated in a wrestling match or series of matches.

Since its formation in July 1996, the New World Order (nWo) organization had been a dominant force. Hollywood Hogan, the leader of the nWo, had been the WCW World Heavyweight Champion for most of the preceding year. Most of the WCW programming in 1997 revolved around Sting, whose character changed into a mysterious avenger. He watched from the rafters of arenas, and did not speak his thoughts. Sting soon showed his opposition to the nWo, and challenged Hogan to a match for the title at Starrcade. In reality, Hogan and Eric Bischoff, the executive vice president of WCW, disagreed over the outcome of the match. This resulted in a planned ending that had Sting lose because of a fast pinfall count by the referee. Bret Hart would restart the match, and Sting would win.

Late in 1997, Bret Hart was a top star in the World Wrestling Federation (WWF), a competitor of WCW. Hart was the WWF Champion, and had decided to leave the WWF and join WCW. As Hart was the champion, WWF owner Vince McMahon devised the Montreal Screwjob, secretly changing the planned outcome of a title match. This resulted in Hart losing the title in controversial manner. After Hart made his debut with WCW, he was assigned as the guest referee for a match between Bischoff and Larry Zbyszko at Starrcade. The outcome of the match between Hogan and Sting at Starrcade was inspired by the Montreal Screwjob.

The match between Hogan and Sting was made official with a pre-taped "live press conference" at the MGM Grand in Las Vegas. This aired on October 28, 1997, on TNT during a commercial break for the premiere of Hogan's new cable movie, Assault on Devil's Island. The promotion was a success, drawing a 4.2 cable rating (at the same time on the USA Network, the WWF ran a Survivor Series Flashback show, which drew a 2.8 rating), with fans tuning in to finally see the Sting/Hogan bout signed. During the press conference, Hogan and Sting had a brief stare-down as Sting signed the contract without ever taking his eyes off the champion. On the November 10 episode of Nitro, the nWo beat down Sting, with Hogan delivering several leg drops as the show came to a close. Sting then disappeared for a month, with the nWo beating down the likes of The Giant, Diamond Dallas Page, the Steiner Brothers, and Larry Zbyszko, and looking stronger than ever.

On the November 24, 1997 episode of Nitro, commentator Zbyszko stormed to the ring following an nWo paid advertisement, only to have propaganda fall from the ceiling showing the nWo's Eric Bischoff posing over him at Halloween Havoc. Bischoff, after repeatedly insulting Zbysko, finally agreed to a match, later scheduled for Starrcade. On the December 1 episode of Nitro, Bischoff claimed he never signed a contract, and wouldn't wrestle unless control of Nitro was on the line, which WCW Commissioner J. J. Dillon agreed to later in the show. On the same episode, Page challenged the nWo's Curt Hennig for the WCW United States Heavyweight Championship. Page hit Hennig with a Diamond Cutter but Rick Rude interrupted the pinfall attempt. This was Page's second disqualification victory over Hennig. The nWo then beat down Page to end the show, with Page sustaining two "Diamond Cutters" from Hogan. On the December 8 episode of Nitro, Ric Flair, on behalf of Page, challenged Hennig to a steel cage match at Starrcade.

=== Postponed match ===
On the December 8 episode of Nitro, the nWo's Kevin Nash (in a pre-recorded statement) declared himself the "one, true giant", belittled The Giant's chokeslam as useless and challenged The Giant to a match at Starrcade. Moments later, The Giant came to the ring and told Gene Okerlund he'd see Nash at Starrcade and was bringing the chokeslam with him. Nash no-showed the event due to 'health issues', and the match would be subsequently postponed and later rescheduled for Souled Out the following month.

== Event ==
Other on-screen personnel
Role:	Name:
Commentator	Tony Schiavone
Commentator	Dusty Rhodes
Commentator	Mike Tenay
Interviewer	Gene Okerlund
Referees	Randy Anderson
Referees	Scott Dickinson
Referees	Mickie Jay
Referees	Nick Patrick
Referees	Charles Robinson
Referees	Billy Silverman
Ring announcers	Michael Buffer
Ring announcers	David Penzer

The first match was between Dean Malenko and Eddie Guerrero for the WCW Cruiserweight Championship. Malenko had the advantage from the start of the match. Guerrero fought back briefly by attacking Malenko's left leg, but Malenko regained the advantage. This continued until Guerrero countered a suplex, and targeted the knee with the use of the ringpost and ringsteps. Guerrero performed a missile dropkick and a frog splash to the knee, and pinned Malenko to win the match, and retain the title.

Scott Hall afterwards came out and stated that that Nash, who was not in attendance, could not wrestle The Giant at the event. The Giant afterwards came out and stated that while understood why Nash was absent, he would wait for another opportunity to wrestle Nash and, following a verbal confrontation, gave Hall a power bomb.

The second match was between the team of Scott Norton, Vincent and Randy Savage (replacing Konnan) of the nWo (accompanied by Miss Elizabeth) and the team of The Steiner Brothers (Rick Steiner and Scott Steiner) and Ray Traylor (accompanied by Ted DiBiase) (WCW). The match started with the nWo having the advantage over Scott. Scott fought back with a double underhook powerbomb, and WCW gained the advantage. Vincent was dominated until Traylor missed a big splash. nWo attacked Traylor until Rick tagged in. The Steiners double-teamed Vincent, and Scott performed an elevated DDT. As Scott was attempting a Frankensteiner on Savage, Norton stopped him, and performed an electric chair drop. Savage then pinned Scott after a diving elbow drop to win the match.

The third match was between Bill Goldberg and Steve McMichael. The match started from the entrance ramp, and went back and forth. Goldberg gained the advantage with a punch to the midsection as McMichael jumped from the top turnbuckle. Goldberg applied the kneebar, and performed a spear. After sending McMichael through a table, Goldberg performed a Jackhammer, and pinned him to win the match.

The fourth match was scheduled to be between Raven and Chris Benoit. Raven chose not to compete, however, and for Saturn to replace him. Saturn was a member of The Flock, a group led by Raven. The match started with Benoit having the advantage. As they fought out the ring, The Flock came out of the audience, and attacked Benoit. Saturn then dominated Benoit, and targeted his neck. As Saturn climbed the turnbuckles, Benoit pushed him to the outside. Benoit applied the Crippler Crossface on Saturn, but The Flock attacked him. Raven performed an Evenflow DDT on Benoit, and Saturn applied the Rings of Saturn. Benoit had passed out from the DDT, and Saturn won the match.

The fifth match was between Buff Bagwell (nWo) and Lex Luger (WCW). Luger had the early advantage until a distraction from Vincent allowed Bagwell to fight back. Bagwell then dominated Luger. Bagwell had Luger in the sleeper hold, and Luger fought out with a belly to back suplex. Luger then blocked a big splash with his knees, and fought back. Luger had Bagwell in the Torture Rack, but the referee was knocked down. Randy Savage and Scott Norton then attempted to interfere. Luger fought off Savage, but Norton punched Luger with a foreign object. Bagwell then pinned Luger to win the match.

The sixth match was between Curt Hennig (nWo) and Diamond Dallas Page (WCW) for the WCW United States Heavyweight Championship. It was originally going to be Ric Flair facing Hennig for the title and it was to be contested in a cage. However, two weeks earlier on Nitro, Flair was injured at the hands of Hennig and the nWo. Because of the injury, DDP took Flair's place in the match. The match started back and forth until Hennig performed a hangman, and gained the advantage. Hennig targeted Page's injured ribs. Page fought back after fighting out of a chinlock with a jawbreaker. Page attacked Hennig outside the ring, and pulled Hennig's groin into the ringpost. They then exchanged attacks, and Page pinned Hennig after a Diamond Cutter to win the match and the title.

The seventh match was between Eric Bischoff (accompanied by Scott Hall) (nWo) and Larry Zbyszko (WCW), with Bret Hart as the guest referee. The organization of the winner would have control over WCW Monday Nitro, WCW's weekly television show. The match began with Zbyszko having the advantage. Hart appeared to be favoring Bischoff, stopping Zbyszko from using certain attacks and holds. Hart pulled Zbyszko away, and this allowed Bischoff to kick Zbyszko in the head. Bischoff continued with kicks and punches, but soon grew weary. Zbyszko fought back, and Hart pulled him back. Hall placed a steel plate in Bischoff's footwear, and Bischoff kicked Zbyszko in the head. Hart appeared to raise Bischoff's hand in victory, but Hart knocked him down instead. Hall came in, and Hart beat him down. Hart applied the Sharpshooter as Zbyszko choked Bischoff. Hart awarded Zbyszko the victory by disqualification for Bischoff using the steel plate.

Sting won the WCW World Heavyweight Championship at Starrcade

The main event was between Hollywood Hogan (nWo) and Sting (WCW) for the WCW World Heavyweight Championship. Nick Patrick, who had favored the nWo before, was chosen as the referee through a random drawing. The match started with Hogan delivering attacks. Sting fought back with dropkicks, and applied the side headlock. Hogan sent Sting out of the ring, and attacked him with the ringpost and guard rail. Hogan performed a big boot, and pinned Sting after a leg drop. However, Bret Hart claimed Patrick counted the pinfall fast, and restarted the match with himself as the referee. Sting performed a Stinger splash, and applied the Scorpion Deathlock. Hart called for the bell and Sting won the championship.

== Aftermath ==
The feud between Hollywood Hogan and Sting continued after Starrcade. The outcome of the main event at Starrcade did not occur as planned, with the referee not making the pinfall count fast enough as scripted. Many former WCW wrestlers who were at Starrcade believe that Hogan through Eric Bischoff instructed the referee Nick Patrick to make a regular three count to protect himself and to make Sting and the debuting Bret Hart look weak. The following night, a controversial rematch took place in which Patrick again counted a 1-2-3 pinfall in Hogan's favor, but saw Sting again defeat Hogan and maintain the championship after referee Randy Anderson restarted the match. To address this, the following WCW programming surrounded the controversy. Replays of the count were shown, and the WCW World Heavyweight Championship was vacated. A rematch was made, and Sting regained the title in a match at SuperBrawl VIII. In 1998, Bill Goldberg was given a push to main event status. Goldberg debuted in 1997, and started an undefeated streak. WCW continued to build the character of Goldberg with the continuation of his undefeated streak since his debut in 1997. On July 6, the undefeated Goldberg defeated Hollywood Hogan to win the WCW World Heavyweight Championship, and remained the champion until the next Starrcade.

Starrcade drew a buy rate of 1.9, the best WCW ever achieved. In 1998, WCW expanded with the creation of another television show, WCW Thunder. However, Thunder could not gain the success of WCW Monday Nitro, WCW's main weekly program. Nitro was also extended from two to three hours, and more house shows were run. In March, the World Wrestling Federation (WWF) began to fight back in its competition with WCW. Stone Cold Steve Austin became the top star in the WWF, and eventually helped the WWF outperform WCW in the following years.

== Reception ==
In 2017, Kevin Pantoja of 411Mania gave the event a rating of 2.0 [Very Bad], stating, "It was WCW's biggest show ever and they bombed. Hard. The only match worth seeing is Malenko/Guerrero and you can see better versions of it elsewhere. There are a whopping THREE matches [that] get negative stars, including the main event being an all-time screw up. They gave Luger/Bagwell the most time of any match, which is a travesty. Savage was a last minute replacement. Hall had no match. Vincent, Traylor, Zbyszko, Bischoff and Mongo were booked, while Rey Mysterio, Harlem Heat and several others sat in the crowd."

The event had a buyrate of 1.90 and 700,000 total buys, which made it the most bought PPV in WCW's history.

== Results ==
No.	Results	Stipulations	Times
1	Eddie Guerrero (c) defeated Dean Malenko	Singles match for the WCW Cruiserweight Championship	14:57
2	Randy Savage, Scott Norton and Vincent (with Miss Elizabeth) defeated Ray Traylor and The Steiner Brothers (Rick Steiner and Scott Steiner) (with Ted DiBiase)	Six-man tag team match	11:06
3	Goldberg defeated Steve McMichael	Singles match	6:00
4	Saturn (with Raven) defeated Chris Benoit	Raven's Rules match	10:50
5	Buff Bagwell defeated Lex Luger	Singles match	16:36
6	Diamond Dallas Page defeated Curt Hennig (c)	Singles match for the WCW United States Heavyweight Championship	10:52
7	Larry Zbyszko defeated Eric Bischoff (with Scott Hall) by disqualification	Singles match with Bret Hart as Special Guest Referee (Note: Since Zbyszko won, he will face Hall at the next Pay Per View, Souled Out. Had Bischoff won, the nWo would take control of Monday Nitro.)	11:12
8	Sting defeated Hollywood Hogan (c)	Singles match for the WCW World Heavyweight Championship	12:53
(c) / – the champion(s) heading into the match
