= Starrcade (1996) =

1996 World Championship Wrestling pay-per-view event

- Promotional poster featuring Lex Luger and Bobby Walker
- Promotion: World Championship Wrestling
- Date: December 29, 1996
- City: Nashville, Tennessee
- Venue: Nashville Municipal Auditorium
- Attendance: 9,030
- Buy rate: 345,000
- Tagline: Not Your Typical Warm, Fuzzy Holiday Special

Pay-per-view chronology
← Previous; World War 3	Next → Souled Out

Starrcade chronology
← Previous; 1995	Next → 1997

The 1996 Starrcade was the 14th annual Starrcade professional wrestling pay-per-view (PPV) event produced by World Championship Wrestling (WCW). It took place on December 29, 1996, from the Nashville Municipal Auditorium in Nashville, Tennessee. The event featured the New World Order (nWo) stable, which formed in July.

The main event was between Hollywood Hogan and Roddy Piper. Piper debuted in WCW a few months prior to oppose the nWo, and challenge Hogan to determine who the bigger icon was. Other matches featured Lex Luger and The Giant, Diamond Dallas Page and Eddie Guerrero for the vacant WCW United States Heavyweight Championship, The Outsiders and the Faces of Fear for the WCW World Tag Team Championship, and Ultimo Dragon and Dean Malenko to unify the J-Crown Championship and the WCW Cruiserweight Championship. The event generated 345,000 ppv buys.

== Storylines ==
The event featured wrestlers from pre-existing scripted feuds and storylines. Wrestlers portrayed villains, heroes, or less distinguishable characters in the scripted events that built tension and culminated in a wrestling match or series of matches.

Hollywood Hogan as the WCW World Heavyweight Champion

The main feud heading into Starrcade was between Roddy Piper and Hollywood Hogan. At Bash at the Beach, Hogan, Scott Hall and Kevin Nash formed the New World Order (nWo), a group of rebels who terrorized, and aimed to take over World Championship Wrestling. Since then, the group increased in members and power, winning the WCW World Heavyweight Championship and the WCW World Tag Team Championship. Piper returned to WCW at Halloween Havoc, and confronted Hogan. Piper claimed to be as big an icon as Hogan and wanted Hogan to admit it. After Hogan did, he insulted Piper when Piper was on his way out of the ring, implying Piper was going to use the women's bathroom. The show went off the air while they were arguing in the ring. In the following weeks, Eric Bischoff claimed that he attempted to get in touch with Piper regarding a match, but said that Piper was not interested since he had said his piece. Finally, Piper showed up on Nitro and accused WCW Executive Vice President Eric Bischoff of secretly working for the nWo. This was revealed to be true as the nWo came out, attacked Piper, and declared their alliance with Bischoff. The match between Piper and Hogan was made for Starrcade.

== Event ==
The first match was between Ultimate Dragon and Dean Malenko to unify the J-Crown Championship and the WCW Cruiserweight Championship. The match started back and forth, with both exchanging holds. Ultimo Dragon gained the advantage with the single leg Boston crab and the STF. Malenko fought back with suplexes, and applied the ankle lock. He then targeted the left leg of Ultimo Dragon. They then went back and forth until Ultimo Dragon missed a moonsault, and Malenko applied the Texas cloverleaf. After Malenko performed a brainbuster, they exchanged holds, and Ultimo Dragon pinned Malenko with a bridging tiger suplex to win the match, and unify the two titles.

The second match was between Akira Hokuto (accompanied by Sonny Onoo and Kensuke Sasaki) and Madusa for the WCW Women's Championship. The match started back and forth. Hokuto applied the double choke, and performed a Northern Lights suplex. Madusa performed a tornado DDT and a powerbomb. After Hokuto performed a superplex, Madusa sent her outside with a dropkick. Onoo came in, and hit Madusa with a pole. Hokuto pinned Madusa after a missile dropkick and a Northern Lights Bomb to win the match and the title.

Other on-screen personnel
Role:	Name:
Commentators	Tony Schiavone
Commentators	Bobby Heenan
Commentators	Dusty Rhodes
Commentators	Mike Tenay (for the Malenko/Ultimo Dragon Match)
Commentators	Lee Marshall (for the Madusa/Hokuto match)
Interviewer	Gene Okerlund
Referees	Randy Anderson
Referees	Mark Curtis
Referees	Scott Dickinson
Referees	Nick Patrick
Ring announcers	Michael Buffer
Ring announcers	David Penzer

The third match was between Jushin Thunder Liger and Rey Mysterio Jr. Liger had the early advantage with a delayed vertical suplex and a powerbomb. Mysterio performed a headscissors takedown, but Liger performed a suplex off the apron. They then went back and forth. Mysterio performed a springboard moonsault and a springboard legdrop. Liger fought back with a diving headbutt. Liger pinned Mysterio after a Liger Bomb to win the match.

The fourth match was a No Disqualification match between Chris Benoit and Jeff Jarrett. The match started back and forth until Benoit performed a belly to back suplex, and applied the sleeper hold. Jarrett fought back with a belly to back suplex, and a belly to belly suplex. Arn Anderson came down as Jarrett performed a back body drop. Jarrett and Benoit exchanged attacks as Kevin Sullivan came down. Sullivan hit Benoit with a wooden chair as Anderson performed a DDT to Jarrett. Jarrett then pinned Benoit to win the match.

The fifth match was between The Outsiders (Scott Hall and Kevin Nash) and The Faces of Fear (Meng and The Barbarian) for the WCW World Tag Team Championship. Nick Patrick, the referee, was biased towards The Outsiders. The match started back and forth until the Faces of Fear double-teamed Nash. Nash fought back after The Barbarian missed a diving elbow drop. The Outsiders dominated The Barbarian until the Faces of Fear double-teamed Hall. After performing a big boot, The Barbarian applied the nerve hold on Hall. Hall fought out with a belly to back suplex, and Nash tagged in. Nash pinned The Barbarian after a big boot and a Jackknife Powerbomb.

The sixth match was between Diamond Dallas Page and Eddie Guerrero in the final match of a tournament for the WCW United States Heavyweight Championship, which had been vacated after the nWo refused to return the belt after stealing it from then-reigning champion Ric Flair. After starting back and forth, Guerrero gained the advantage with a slingshot senton, and applied the armbar. Guerrero performed mounted punches, but Page dropped him on the top turnbuckle. Page had the advantage, and applied the abdominal stretch. They then went back and forth until Hall, Nash and Syxx came down. The Outsiders, who had been interfering in Page's matches for several weeks to help him win and join the nWo, interfered against Page this time. Hall performed an Outsider's Edge on Page, and Guerrero pinned him after a frog splash to win the match and the title. After the match, Hall, Nash and Syxx beat down Guerrero and stole the title belt again.

Roddy Piper, before his match with Hollywood Hogan at Starrcade

The seventh match was between The Giant and Lex Luger. The match began with Luger delivering punches, and The Giant pushing off Luger. The Giant dominated Luger after performing a clothesline. Luger fought back with kicks after The Giant missed a body avalanche. The Giant continued to attack, but missed a dropkick. Luger performed clotheslines, a hangman's neckbreaker and a scoop slam. Luger then applied the Torture Rack, but Syxx came down, and performed a spin kick to Luger. Sting came down, and left a baseball bat in the ring. Luger performed a low blow to The Giant, and pinned him after several attacks with the bat to win the match.

The main event was between Hollywood Hogan (accompanied by Ted DiBiase) and Roddy Piper. The match started back and forth. After Piper performed a clothesline and kicks, Hogan left the ring. Piper followed, and sent Hogan's head into the guard rail. Piper then whipped and choked Hogan with a belt. DiBiase distracted Piper, and Hogan fought back, sending Piper's head into the guard rail. Hogan kicked Piper's hip, and applied the abdominal stretch. They exchanged attacks, and The Giant came down. He attempted to perform a chokeslam to Piper. At this point, a fan interrupted the finale by jumping the safety barrier and hitting Ted DiBiase. The Giant was confused by the event and continued to hold Roddy in the chokeslam position. Hogan and referee Randy Anderson ran over and subdued the fan, by kicking him several times in the ring corner until security arrived. After the incident was over, the match continued and Piper reversed the chokeslam hold by biting The Giant on the nose. Piper then applied the sleeper hold on Hogan, causing him to pass out, and won the match.

== Aftermath ==
After Starrcade, The Giant was removed from the New World Order (nWo) for failing to help Hogan win his match. The Giant was also unhappy with how he was never given a match for Hollywood Hogan's WCW World Heavyweight Championship despite winning the World War 3 battle royal. At Souled Out, The Giant faced Hogan for the title, but the match ended with nWo members beating down The Giant. Roddy Piper continued his feud with Hogan after, and they faced each other at SuperBrawl VII for the title. Randy Savage interfered, helping Hogan win the match, and their feud ended. Throughout 1997, WCW seemed to revolve around Sting, whose character was changed to become an avenger, frequently seen observing from the rafters. The storyline was built towards his match with Hogan for the title at the following Starrcade.

=== Reception ===
WCW earned $113,040 in ticket sales with an attendance of 9,030. The pay-per-view received a buyrate of 0.95, which is the equivalent of approximately 380,000 buys. The event was released on VHS in the United States on April 15, 1997 by Warner Home Video.

Arnold Furious of 411Mania gave the event a rating of 6.5 [Average], stating, "This is a great show until the nWo stuff kicks in. While a few months beforehand it was fresh and different now it was getting irritating. While it was nice that they let some of the cruisers go and have fun in the early going (Malenko-Dragon & Liger-Mysterio) you have to think that was because they weren’t deemed important enough for the nWo to care about them. Once the show got into the more important matches the nWo was everywhere and had their fingers in every pie including DDP-Guerrero, which had nothing to do with them at all. A couple of good cruiserweight matches doesn’t make a show great as anyone who watches TNA will testify but it makes the show passable enough to get a mild thumbs up. I’d watch most of the last two matches on fast forward though because they suck."

== Results ==
No.	Results	Stipulations	Times
1	Ultimate Dragon (J-Crown) (with Sonny Onoo) defeated Dean Malenko (Cruiserweight)	Title Unification match for the J-Crown and the WCW Cruiserweight Championship	18:30
2	Akira Hokuto (with Sonny Onoo and Kensuke Sasaki) defeated Madusa	Singles match for the inaugural WCW Women's Championship	7:06
3	Jushin Thunder Liger defeated Rey Mysterio Jr.	Singles match	14:16
4	Jeff Jarrett defeated Chris Benoit (with Woman)	No Disqualification match	13:48
5	The Outsiders (Kevin Nash and Scott Hall) (c) (with Syxx) defeated The Faces of Fear (Meng and The Barbarian) (with Jimmy Hart)	Tag team match for the WCW World Tag Team Championship	11:54
6	Eddie Guerrero defeated Diamond Dallas Page	Singles match for the vacant WCW United States Heavyweight Championship	15:20
7	Lex Luger defeated The Giant	Singles match	13:23
8	Roddy Piper defeated Hollywood Hogan (with Ted DiBiase) by technical submission	Non-title Singles match	15:27
(c) / – the champion(s) heading into the match

=== Women's Championship Tournament ===
Quarterfinals
Madusa
Reina Jubuki
Zero
Malia Hosaka
Kaoru
Sonoko Kato
Akira Hokuto
Meiko Satomura

Semifinals
Madusa
Zero
Kaoru
Akira Hokuto

Final
Madusa
Akira Hokuto

=== United States Heavyweight Championship Tournament ===
Quarterfinals
Eddie Guerrero	21:28
Konnan
Chris Benoit	8:54
Steven Regal
Lex Luger	DCO
Arn Anderson	18:18
Jeff Jarrett	11:31
Diamond Dallas Page

Semifinals
Eddie Guerrero	11:44
Chris Benoit
BYE
Diamond Dallas Page

Final
Eddie Guerrero	15:20
Diamond Dallas Page
