= Souled Out (1998) =

1998 World Championship Wrestling pay-per-view event

- Promotion: World Championship Wrestling
- Brand(s): WCW nWo
- Date: January 24, 1998
- City: Dayton, Ohio
- Venue: Hara Arena
- Attendance: 5,486
- Buy rate: 380,000
- Tagline(s): Hell Hath No Fury Like... First Fight '98; Who Do You Trust?

Pay-per-view chronology
← Previous; Starrcade	Next → SuperBrawl VIII

Souled Out chronology
← Previous; 1997	Next → 1999

Souled Out (1998) was the second Souled Out professional wrestling pay-per-view (PPV) event produced by World Championship Wrestling (WCW) and sponsored by Snickers. The event took place on January 24, 1998 from the Hara Arena in Dayton, Ohio. Unlike the previous year's event, this year's event was billed as a joint production by WCW and the nWo (in storyline) and the pay-per-view events until the following year's Uncensored were jointly produced by WCW and the nWo. The event generated 380,000 ppv buys.

The event featured a double main event. The first main event featured Bret Hart making his WCW in-ring debut against Ric Flair. Hart made Flair submit to the Sharpshooter. The second main event featured WCW's Lex Luger against nWo's Randy Savage. Luger made Savage submit to the Torture Rack.

The event featured several WCW vs. nWo matches. There were two singles matches as Larry Zbyszko and The Giant represented WCW against the nWo's Scott Hall and Kevin Nash in respective matches while WCW's Ray Traylor and The Steiner Brothers (Rick Steiner and Scott Steiner) took on the nWo's Konnan, Scott Norton and Buff Bagwell in a six-man tag team match. Aside from WCW vs. nWo matches, the WCW Cruiserweight Championship and the WCW World Television Championship were also defended at the event. Chris Benoit took on Raven in a Raven's Rules Match and a lucha libre cruiserweight eight-man tag team match also took place at the event.

== Storylines ==
The event featured wrestlers from pre-existing scripted feuds and storylines. Wrestlers portrayed villains, heroes, or less distinguishable characters in the scripted events that built tension and culminated in a wrestling match or series of matches.

At Starrcade, Randy Savage provided a distraction to Lex Luger during his match against Savage's teammate Buff Bagwell, allowing Bagwell to win the match. Luger defeated Bagwell in a rematch the following night on Nitro and then challenged Savage to a match. Luger defeated Savage in a short match on the following week's Nitro. Luger then cost Savage, a match against Chris Adams by hitting Savage with a steel chair on the debut episode of Thunder. Later on the show, it was announced that Luger would face Savage at Souled Out.

Larry Zbyszko's rivalry with the nWo, particularly Scott Hall, had been brewing since Zbyszko confronted Eric Bischoff and threw him off of the Nitro set in the spring of 1997. In October, Zbyszko counted a pin against Hall and Syxx to allow the Steiner Brothers to regain the WCW World Tag Team Championship. Later, at Halloween Havoc, Zbyszko officiated the match between Hall and Luger. He initially counted the fall for Hall, but reversed his decision after consulting a replay showing Syxx's interference behind Zbyszko's back. Luger won the restarted match, but after the match he fell victim to an attack by Hall, Syxx, and Bischoff. At Starrcade, in a match where control of Nitro was at stake, Zbyszko won after special referee Bret Hart disqualified Bischoff for putting a metal plate in his shoe.

== Event ==
Other on-screen personnel
Role:	Name:
Commentators	Tony Schiavone
Commentators	Bobby Heenan
Commentators	Mike Tenay
Interviewer	Gene Okerlund
Ring announcers	Michael Buffer
Ring announcers	David Penzer
Referee	Randy Anderson
Referee	Mickie Jay
Referee	Charles Robinson
Referee	Nick Patrick
Referee	Billy Silverman

One notable moment of the night was when Kevin Nash attempted his Jackknife Powerbomb on The Giant. Nash was unable to lift the Giant high enough, and the impact caused the Giant to land on his head. The announcers were noticeably stunned as it appeared the Giant may have suffered a serious neck injury. While he ultimately recovered, Nash and the Giant would play it off as a deliberate move on Nash's part to try to break the Giant's neck.

Dusty Rhodes began the evening as the second color commentator alongside Bobby Heenan, but left the table to accompany Larry Zbyszko, at his request, to the ring for his match with Scott Hall. Rhodes then turned on Zbyszko during the match to align himself with Hall and the New World Order and did not return to the broadcast position; Mike Tenay joined Heenan and Tony Schiavone for the rest of the program.

== Reception ==
In 2010, 411Mania staff gave the event a rating of 7.5 [Good], stating, "All the non-nWo stuff delivers, but all the nWo stuff pretty much sucks. Even though there's a lot to enjoy on this card, it still reminded me of a nursing home, since you could smell death coming. Eric Bischoff was a one-trick pony for a booker. The only major angle he came up with was nWo. It got over huge, but once it was time to end it, he didn't. Instead of pushing talent the fans wanted to see, he shoved nWo down the fans' throats. Bischoff thought no matter how shitty the product was, people would still watch WCW over WWF. His method did in fact work for a while, but once people started seeing fresh talent, interesting characters, cussing, puppies, and aggressive violence - the WCW fans evolved into WWF fans. I will have to give this a thumbs up, but do not say I didn't warn you about the nWo garbage."

== Results ==
No.	Results	Stipulations	Times
1	Juventud Guerrera, Super Caló, Lizmark Jr. and Chavo Guerrero Jr. defeated La Parka, Psychosis, Silver King and El Dandy	Eight-man tag team match	09:30
2	Chris Benoit defeated Raven	Raven's Rules Match	10:36
3	Chris Jericho defeated Rey Misterio Jr. (c)	Singles match for the WCW Cruiserweight Championship	08:22
4	Booker T (c) defeated Rick Martel	Singles match for the WCW World Television Championship	10:50
5	Larry Zbyszko (with Dusty Rhodes) defeated Scott Hall (with Louie Spicolli) by disqualification	Singles match	08:09
6	Ray Traylor and The Steiner Brothers (Rick and Scott) (with Ted DiBiase) defeated nWo (Buff Bagwell, Konnan and Scott Norton) (with Vincent)	Six-man tag team match	12:20
7	Kevin Nash (with Hollywood Hogan and Eric Bischoff) defeated The Giant	Singles match	10:47
8	Bret Hart defeated Ric Flair	Singles match	18:06
9	Lex Luger defeated Randy Savage (with Miss Elizabeth)	Singles match	07:07
(c) / – the champion(s) heading into the match
