= Souled Out =

World Championship Wrestling pay-per-view series

- WCW Souled Out 2000 logo
- Promotions: World Championship Wrestling
- Brands: nWo (1997); WCW/nWo (1998-1999)
- First event: Souled Out (1997)
- Last event: Souled Out (2000)
- Signature matches: WCW roster vs. nWo members

Souled Out was a professional wrestling pay-per-view (PPV) event promoted by World Championship Wrestling (WCW) in January from 1997 through 2000. The 1997 and 1998 WCW Souled Out PPV events were held on Saturdays due to the Super Bowl being played the next day, the 1999 and 2000 shows were held on Sundays.

The event was originally conceived in 1997 as a New World Order (nWo) exclusive pay-per-view, but did not generate the revenue that WCW had hoped it would, due to a low buy rate and a lack of ticket revenue from hosting the event in such a small facility. The pay-per-view was also created as a testing nWo event in order to see if there was enough demand to having two PPVs per month (one as a WCW event and the other as an nWo event). Despite the initial poor review, WCW elected to keep the event on its calendar (as prior to 1997 it did not have a regular January PPV event) and Souled Out became a co-branded WCW/nWo event during the 1998 edition. This established a practice WCW used throughout 1998, as all of its pay-per-view events that year were co-branded. The co-branding continued until the following Souled Out, when interim WCW President Ric Flair declared that WCW pay-per-views would no longer carry nWo branding.

The final Souled Out event was held in 2000, and WCW renamed its January PPV WCW Sin for 2001. Since its 2001 purchase of WCW, World Wrestling Entertainment has owned the rights to the Souled Out name, but have not used it for a pay-per-view. In 2015, All WCW pay-per-views were made available on the WWE Network.

== Souled Out dates and venues ==
nWo-branded event	WCW/nWo co-branded event

Event	Date	City	Venue	Main Event	Ref(s)
Souled Out (1997)	January 25, 1997	Cedar Rapids, Iowa	Five Seasons Center	Hollywood Hogan (c) vs. The Giant for the WCW World Heavyweight Championship	
Souled Out (1998)	January 24, 1998	Dayton, Ohio	Hara Arena	Lex Luger vs. Randy Savage	
Souled Out (1999)	January 17, 1999	Charleston, West Virginia	Charleston Civic Center	Goldberg vs. Scott Hall in a Stun Gun Ladder match	
Souled Out (2000)	January 16, 2000	Cincinnati, Ohio	Firstar Center	Chris Benoit vs. Sid Vicious for the vacant WCW World Heavyweight Championship with special guest referee Arn Anderson	
(c) – refers to the champion(s) heading into the match
