= Souled Out (2000) =

2000 World Championship Wrestling pay-per-view event

- UK VHS cover featuring Kevin Nash, Diamond Dallas Page and Buff Bagwell
- Promotion: World Championship Wrestling
- Date: January 16, 2000
- City: Cincinnati, Ohio
- Venue: Firstar Center
- Attendance: 14,132
- Buy rate: 115,000
- Tagline(s): Control Is Everything! Who Will Be The Soul Survivor?

Pay-per-view chronology
← Previous; Starrcade	Next → SuperBrawl 2000

Souled Out chronology
← Previous; 1999	Next → Final

Souled Out (2000) was the fourth and final Souled Out professional wrestling pay-per-view (PPV) event produced by World Championship Wrestling (WCW). It took place on January 16, 2000, from the Firstar Center in Cincinnati, Ohio. The event would be replaced by Sin as the January pay-per-view the following year.

In the main event, Chris Benoit defeated Sid Vicious to win the vacant WCW World Heavyweight Championship. The match ended up being Benoit's last in WCW, as he left for the WWF the next night along with Eddie Guerrero, Dean Malenko, and Perry Saturn.

== Background ==
This was the pay-per-view where creative writers Vince Russo and Ed Ferrara were not involved in the scripting of the show as Russo stepped down days before after being told by management that he had to work in a creative team rather than write the show by himself alongside Ferrara. Prior to this evening, the creative direction from October 18, 1999, had been drastically different with a focus on the development of storylines and younger stars due to the involvement of the creative writers.

== Storylines ==
The event featured wrestlers from pre-existing scripted feuds and storylines. Wrestlers portrayed villains, heroes, or less distinguishable characters in the scripted events that built tension and culminated in a wrestling match or series of matches.

The originally scheduled card was heavily changed due to the serious injuries of Bret Hart and Jeff Jarrett. On the December 20, 1999 edition of WCW Monday Nitro, the WCW World Heavyweight Championship was vacated due to a controversial finish to the main event match between Hart and Goldberg at Starrcade, where Goldberg mule-kicked Hart; this resulted in a severe concussion which limited Hart's ability to compete. Hart defeated Goldberg to win the vacant title with the help of Scott Hall and Kevin Nash; this resulted in the formation of a new incarnation of the nWo known as nWo 2000. However, in early 2000, Hart was diagnosed with post-concussion syndrome; this forced him to vacate the title on his own terms. Jarrett, who was scheduled to wrestle Chris Benoit in a Triple Threat Theater series (Dungeon Rules, Bunkhouse, Caged Heat), suffered lingering headaches from Benoit's diving headbutt off the top of the steel cage on the January 10 episode of Nitro, which forced him to vacate the WCW United States Heavyweight Championship. Benoit was instead moved to take Hart's place against Vicious in the championship match and the Triple Threat Theater series was contested between Billy Kidman and three separate wrestlers. Kidman won the first match because Dean Malenko forgot that the match rules stated that a wrestler could win by having his opponent's feet touch the floor; Malenko had rolled out of the ring to collect himself in the early stages of the match, thus losing the match per the rules. The second match of the show was originally scheduled to be a match between Flair and Crowbar and Vampiro and a partner of his choosing for the WCW World Tag Team Championship; when Flair and Crowbar jumped Vampiro during a backstage interview, Vampiro wanted to take them on himself.

Other on-screen personnel
Role:	Name:
Commentator	Tony Schiavone
Commentator	Bobby Heenan
Commentator	Mike Tenay
Interviewers	Gene Okerlund
Interviewers	Scott Hudson
Referee	Johnny Boone
Referee	Mark Johnson
Referee	Nick Patrick
Referee	Charles Robinson
Referee	Billy Silverman
Ring announcer	Michael Buffer
Ring announcer	David Penzer

== Reception ==
In 2014, Kevin Pantoja of 411Mania gave the event a rating of 0.0 [Torture], stating, "Why would any company put on a show this bad? 12 matches and not one can get to two stars. Nothing on this card is redeemable and it's the worst Pay-Per-View that I've ever seen. Seriously, every single thing on this show is bad and most of it doesn't make sense."

== Results ==
No.	Results	Stipulations	Times
1	Billy Kidman defeated Dean Malenko	Catch-as-Catch Can match	02:36
2	Vampiro defeated David Flair and Crowbar (with Daffney)	Handicap match	10:32
3	The Mamalukes (Big Vito and Johnny the Bull) (with Disco Inferno) defeated The Harris Brothers (Ron and Don)	Tag team match	09:33
4	Oklahoma defeated Madusa (c) (with Spice)	Singles match for the WCW Cruiserweight Championship	02:56
5	Brian Knobbs (c) defeated Fit Finlay, Norman Smiley and Meng	Four-Way match for the WCW Hardcore Championship	06:11
6	Billy Kidman defeated Perry Saturn	Bunkhouse Brawl	10:05
7	Booker T (with Midnight) defeated Stevie Ray by disqualification	Singles match	06:30
8	Tank Abbott defeated Jerry Flynn	Singles match	01:39
9	Buff Bagwell defeated Diamond Dallas Page	Last Man Standing match	11:19
10	The Wall (with Shane Douglas) defeated Billy Kidman	Caged Heat match	05:03
11	Kevin Nash defeated Terry Funk	Hardcore match (Note: Since Nash won, he became the new WCW commissioner. Had Funk won, the nWo would disband.)	07:59
12	Chris Benoit defeated Sid Vicious by submission	Singles match for the vacant WCW World Heavyweight Championship with Arn Anderson as special guest referee	14:53
(c) / – the champion(s) heading into the match

== Aftermath ==
The following night on Nitro, Chris Benoit was (kayfabe) stripped of the WCW World Heavyweight Championship after Arn Anderson determined that Sid Vicious's foot was under the rope when Benoit performed the submission hold. In reality, however, Benoit left for the WWF and relinquished the title due to a management dispute. Eddie Guerrero, Dean Malenko, and Perry Saturn also departed for the WWF in solidarity with Benoit. WCW then refused to recognize Benoit's reign; this reign was later recognized by the WWF after it acquired the rights to the championship in March 2001.

As a result of Benoit leaving WCW for the WWF, a tournament was organized to determine who would receive the vacated championship. On the January 24 edition of Nitro, Sid Vicious defeated the Harris Brothers for the right to face Kevin Nash, who became the commissioner of WCW after defeating Terry Funk at Souled Out. Vicious then defeated Nash to win the vacant title; however, he was stripped of the WCW World Heavyweight Championship on the January 26 edition of WCW Thunder for pinning the wrong Harris brother. This led to a triple threat steel cage match between Vicious, Nash, and Ron Harris for the vacant title; Sid went on to win the championship by forcing Nash to submit, and would remain champion until WCW was rebooted one week before Spring Stampede.
