= Halloween Havoc (1997) =

World Championship Wrestling pay-per-view event

- VHS cover featuring Hulk Hogan and Roddy Piper
- Promotion: World Championship Wrestling
- Date: October 26, 1997
- City: Paradise, Nevada
- Venue: MGM Grand Garden Arena
- Attendance: 12,457
- Buy rate: 405,000
- Tagline: Snap Into The Madness!

Pay-per-view chronology
← Previous; Fall Brawl	Next → World War 3

Halloween Havoc chronology
← Previous; 1996	Next → 1998

The 1997 Halloween Havoc was the ninth annual Halloween Havoc professional wrestling pay-per-view (PPV) event produced by World Championship Wrestling (WCW). It took place on October 26, 1997, from the MGM Grand Garden Arena in Paradise, Nevada.

The event is notable for the Rey Mysterio Jr. vs. Eddie Guerrero title vs. mask match for the WCW Cruiserweight Championship, which is considered both one of the best matches in WCW history, and one of the best matches of the 1990s.

== Production ==
=== Background ===
Halloween Havoc was an annual professional wrestling pay-per-view event produced by World Championship Wrestling (WCW) since 1989. As the name implies, it was a Halloween-themed show held in October. The 1997 event was the ninth event in the Halloween Havoc chronology and it took place on October 26, 1997, from the MGM Grand Garden Arena in the Las Vegas suburb of Paradise, Nevada for the second consecutive year.

=== Storylines ===
The event featured professional wrestling matches that involve different wrestlers from pre-existing scripted feuds and storylines. Professional wrestlers portray villains, heroes, or less distinguishable characters in the scripted events that build tension and culminate in a wrestling match or series of matches.

One of the major stories involved the rivalry that had developed between Larry Zbyszko and the nWo over the course of the previous several months. Earlier in the year, in one of the many instances where the nWo ran the WCW Monday Nitro broadcast crew out of their position, Eric Bischoff was on commentary mocking The Giant, who was in the ring cutting a promo. Zbyszko decided he had had enough of Bischoff's antics and returned to the desk, demanding Bischoff to leave. Bischoff responded by picking a fight with the former wrestler, which allowed Zbyszko to apply a front facelock on Bischoff and drag him to the ring for Giant to chokeslam him.

A match was signed pitting Scott Hall against Lex Luger for Halloween Havoc with Zbyszko as the special guest referee. Later, on the October 13 edition of Nitro, Hall and Syxx were defending the WCW World Tag Team Championship against the Steiner Brothers, with the team using Wölfpac Rules to allow Syxx to substitute for Kevin Nash. Zbyszko got involved after Hall pulled referee Charles Robinson out of the ring, chasing him into the ring where he counted the pin for Rick Steiner on Hall; Roddy Piper, who had recently returned to television as the onscreen WCW commissioner, upheld the decision after an nWo protest.

Piper himself, meanwhile, still had a problem with reigning WCW World Heavyweight Champion Hollywood Hogan. Since Piper made his WCW debut at the previous year's Halloween Havoc, the two wrestlers had squared off three times in pay-per-view main events. Piper won the first match, a non-title match at Starrcade in December 1996, while Hogan won the rematch to retain his title at SuperBrawl in February 1997. Piper had also been part of the three team elimination battle royal at Uncensored in March of 1997, but his team was eliminated. Had his team won, Piper would have received a third match with Hogan inside a steel cage; since he was now in power, Piper decided to make that match for Halloween Havoc. Since Hogan was slated to defend his championship against Sting at Starrcade in December of that year, the title was not on the line in this match.

Another longstanding feud involving the nWo and WCW was the rivalry between Randy Savage and Diamond Dallas Page, which began shortly after Savage betrayed WCW at SuperBrawl. In an intensely personal rivalry, which also involved attacks on Page's wife Kimberly and the meddling of Miss Elizabeth, Savage's valet, as well as some trickery by Page, the two men had already met twice in 1997. At Spring Stampede in April, Page defeated Savage in the main event with a Diamond Cutter. Savage got his return victory at The Great American Bash in June in a falls count anywhere match. A last man standing match, called a Las Vegas Sudden Death Match for this event, was signed for Halloween Havoc to settle the feud.

Two separate feuds centered around the splintering of the Four Horsemen. The first involved the aftermath of the War Games match at Fall Brawl the previous month. The match was originally supposed to feature Ric Flair, Chris Benoit, Arn Anderson, and Steve McMichael facing the nWo's Nash, Syxx, Konnan, and Buff Bagwell. Anderson, however, had been dealing with significant arm injuries due to years of physical contact and was forced into retirement over the summer of 1997. In his retirement ceremony, which aired on the August 25 edition of Nitro, Anderson asked Curt Hennig, who had recently returned to professional wrestling competition after a multi-year hiatus due to injuries and had also signed with WCW, to take "his spot" as the Horsemen's enforcer. Hennig agreed, but conspired with the nWo to betray the Horsemen and assist them in handcuffing Benoit and McMichael to the cage while mercilessly assaulting the helpless Flair. McMichael eventually surrendered in the hopes that it would stop the attack, but Hennig instead punctuated it by slamming the cage door on Flair's head. The next night, Henning presented Flair's robe to Hogan, then defeated McMichael to win the WCW United States Championship. Flair would return to challenge Hennig several weeks later.

McMichael, meanwhile, had his own concerns that revolved around his former wife and valet, Queen Debra. Entering 1997, McMichael and Jeff Jarrett had been quarreling over Jarrett's being included in the Horsemen. Shortly after Jarrett beat Dean Malenko for the United States Championship, he was kicked out of the Horsemen and then joined by Debra after she betrayed McMichael in their match at Bash at the Beach. The continued feud was to culminate at Halloween Havoc, with Jarrett and McMichael to fight one last time. However, Jarrett's WCW contract had expired shortly before Halloween Havoc and he had decided to return to the World Wrestling Federation. Since Debra had also begun managing Alex Wright in the intervening weeks, Wright was inserted into the match to take the place of the departed Jarrett.

== Event ==
Other on-screen personnel
Role:	Name:
Commentators	Tony Schiavone
Commentators	Bobby Heenan
Commentators	Mike Tenay
Commentators	Dusty Rhodes
Interviewer	Gene Okerlund
Ring announcers	Michael Buffer
Ring announcers	David Penzer
Referees	Randy Anderson
Referees	Mark Curtis
Referees	Scott Dickinson
Referees	Mickie Jay
Referees	Nick Patrick

The third match was for the Cruiserweight title between Eddie Guerrero and Rey Mysterio with the added stipulation that if Mysterio lost he would no longer be allowed to wrestle wearing a luchador mask. Mysterio won the match after he managed to counter Guerrero's crucifix powerbomb off the second rope into a Hurricanrana for the pin being one of the greatest matches in Wrestling history.

The fourth match pitted Alex Wright against Steve McMichael, with Wright being a replacement for the departed Jeff Jarrett. Goldberg attacked McMichael during the match, hit the Jackhammer on him, and placed Wright on top of him for the pin. After the match Goldberg was given McMichael's Super Bowl XX championship ring by McMichael's ex-wife Debra and then attacked Wright in the ring.

Ric Flair challenged Curt Hennig for the United States Championship. Flair wrapped Hennig in a tree of woe, put the title belt over Hennig's head, and kicked the center plate into his face to cause a disqualification.

Next was the match between Scott Hall and Lex Luger with Larry Zbyszko as the special guest referee. Hall originally defeated Luger by giving him the Outsiders Edge after Syxx interfered and kicked Luger in the head as Zbyszko was arguing with Eric Bischoff. He then began celebrating in the ring with Bischoff and Syxx and forced Zbyszko to raise his hand in victory.

Zbyszko, meanwhile, suspected the nWo had played a role in Hall's victory and called for a replay of the match's ending. Once he saw what Syxx had done, Zbyszko restarted the match. Hall began arguing with Zbyszko once back in the ring, and Zbyszko shoved him into a waiting Luger. Luger then placed Hall in the Torture Rack and Hall submitted. As Zbyszko called for the bell Syxx attacked him, only to be put in a gogoplata followed by a guillotine choke. Bischoff and Hall then returned to the ring and attacked Zbyszko, ending with Bischoff kicking Zbyszko in the head and Hall counting a pin.

Randy Savage defeated Diamond Dallas Page in a last man standing match after a fake Sting (Hollywood Hogan) hit Page with a baseball bat. The only way to win the match was to have your opponent not answer the referee's count of 10.

In the main event, held inside a steel cage, Roddy Piper beat Hogan by technical submission with a sleeper hold. Randy Savage interfered by climbing into the cage and he and Hogan beat down Piper following the match. After the match, a fan climbed into the cage and was beat up by Savage and Hogan.

== Reception ==
In 2017, Kevin Pantoja of 411Mania gave the event a rating of 6.0 [Average], stating, "One of the better WCW Pay-Per-Views I can recall from this era. It still suffered from the same issues (fun undercard with a bad main event) but had more positives. For one, you can’t miss Guerrero/Mysterio. It is required viewing. Nagata/Dragon and DDP/Savage were both strong matches. Gedo/Jericho is alright too. There are a few stinkers (Mongo/Wright, Disco/Jackie and Hogan/Piper) but the good manages to outweigh the bad on this particular night."

== Results ==
No.	Results	Stipulations	Times
1	Yuji Nagata (with Sonny Onoo) defeated Último Dragón	Singles match	09:42
2	Chris Jericho defeated Gedo	Singles match	07:18
3	Rey Misterio Jr. defeated Eddie Guerrero (c)	Title vs. Mask match for the WCW Cruiserweight Championship	13:51
4	Alex Wright (with Debra) defeated Steve McMichael	Singles match	06:31
5	Jacqueline defeated Disco Inferno	Singles match	09:39
6	Curt Hennig (c) defeated Ric Flair by disqualification	Singles match for WCW United States Heavyweight Championship	13:57
7	Lex Luger defeated Scott Hall (with Syxx)	Singles match with Larry Zbyszko as special guest referee	13:02
8	Randy Savage (with Miss Elizabeth) defeated Diamond Dallas Page	Las Vegas Sudden Death match	18:07
9	Roddy Piper defeated Hollywood Hogan	Steel Cage match	13:37
(c) / – the champion(s) heading into the match
