= Souled Out (1999) =

1999 World Championship Wrestling pay-per-view event

- Promotional poster
- Promotion: World Championship Wrestling
- Brand(s): WCW nWo
- Date: January 17, 1999
- City: Charleston, West Virginia
- Venue: Charleston Civic Center
- Attendance: 10,833
- Buy rate: 330,000
- Tagline: No Turning Back

Pay-per-view chronology
← Previous; Starrcade	Next → SuperBrawl IX

Souled Out chronology
← Previous; 1998	Next → 2000

Souled Out (1999) was the third Souled Out professional wrestling pay-per-view (PPV) event produced by World Championship Wrestling (WCW). The event took place on January 17, 1999, from the Charleston Civic Center in Charleston, West Virginia.

The main event was a Stun Gun ladder match between Scott Hall and Goldberg, based on Hall helping Kevin Nash in beating Goldberg for the WCW World Heavyweight Championship and ending Goldberg's undefeated streak, the previous month at Starrcade. The objective of the match was to retrieve the stun gun by climbing the ladder and tasing the opponent with the gun to win the match. Goldberg won by tasing Hall after performing a Spear and a Jackhammer.

== Storylines ==
The event featured wrestlers from pre-existing scripted feuds and storylines. Wrestlers portrayed villains, heroes, or less distinguishable characters in the scripted events that built tension and culminated in a wrestling match or series of matches.

The Chris Benoit vs. Mike Enos and Fit Finlay vs. Van Hammer matches were not advertised ahead of time. The Finlay vs. Hammer match was also not included in the home video release of the event, though it was later included when the event was uploaded to the WWE Network.

Other on-screen personnel
Role:	Name:
Commentators	Tony Schiavone
Commentators	Bobby Heenan
Commentators	Mike Tenay
Interviewer	Gene Okerlund
Ring announcers	David Penzer
Ring announcers	Michael Buffer
Referees	Johnny Boone
Referees	Scott Dickinson
Referees	Mickie Jay
Referees	Charles Robinson
Referees	Billy Silverman

== Reception ==
The event has received mixed to negative reviews from critics.

In 2007, Arnold Furious of 411Mania gave the event a rating of 5.0 [Not So Good], stating, "This PPV doesn’t actually suck, which is a refreshing change. The very positive reviews at the time were probably down to the improvement over the previous six months worth of drek. Time isn’t kind to it. The cruiser 4-way doesn’t hold up too well (actually suggested as a MOTYC at the time, no really). Neither does anything else really. At least most of the show isn’t actively bad and nothing slips into negative snowflakes. Call this one thumbs in the middle."

In 2021, Lance Augustine of TJR Wrestling gave the event a rating of 5 out of 10, stating, "Where do I begin? The first hour of this show was hard to get through. It featured matches that had no heat and weren’t that good overall, despite having moments of excitement. The crowd on the night was either into everything someone did or was completely silent. There was no middle ground. I mentioned in the introduction that Nash, after beating Goldberg for the title, turned around and laid down for Hogan to have him win the title. Why not have Hogan defend the title on this show? I couldn’t imagine wrestling Pay-Per-Views where the champion didn’t defend the title or just be involved in more than a run-in, but that was WCW booking at this point. This was a forgettable show, but I didn’t think the Cruiserweight Four Corners match was good. Although, not much else was."

In 2022, Paul Matthews of Classic Wrestling Review described the event as "lackluster," stating, "The first half of this PPV was a slog. They filled it with dull action and meaningless contests. WCW only had three weeks to build this event, but that’s no excuse for this card. The final hour saved it from being terrible, but it was still a lackluster show. This isn’t a great way to begin the year. They are already hurting from the poor booking choices. It also doesn’t help the WWF is on fire."

The event generated 330,000 ppv buys.

== Results ==
No.	Results	Stipulations	Times
1	Chris Benoit defeated Mike Enos	Singles match	10:34
2	Norman Smiley defeated Chavo Guerrero Jr.	Singles match	15:44
3	Fit Finlay defeated Van Hammer	Singles match	07:54
4	Bam Bam Bigelow defeated Wrath	Singles match	09:23
5	Lex Luger (with Miss Elizabeth) defeated Konnan	Singles match	09:31
6	Chris Jericho (with Ralphus) defeated Perry Saturn	Loser Wears a Dress match (Note: Since Saturn lost, he was forced to wear a dress.)	11:44
7	Billy Kidman (c) defeated Rey Misterio Jr., Juventud Guerrera and Psychosis	Fatal 4-Way match for the WCW Cruiserweight Championship	14:25
8	Ric and David Flair (with Arn Anderson) defeated Curt Hennig and Barry Windham	Tag team match	13:56
9	Goldberg defeated Scott Hall	Stun Gun Ladder match	17:45
(c) / – the champion(s) heading into the match
