= Souled Out (1997) =

1997 World Championship Wrestling pay-per-view event

- Promotional poster featuring The Giant, Hollywood Hogan, Scott Hall, and Kevin Nash
- Promotion: World Championship Wrestling
- Brand: nWo
- Date: January 25, 1997
- City: Cedar Rapids, Iowa
- Venue: Five Seasons Center
- Attendance: 5,120
- Buy rate: 170,000
- Tagline(s): Finally... a Pay-Per-View Worth Watching; The World Ain't Big Enough for the Both of Us.

Pay-per-view chronology
← Previous; Starrcade	Next → SuperBrawl VII

Souled Out chronology
← Previous; First	Next → 1998

Souled Out (1997) was the inaugural Souled Out professional wrestling pay-per-view (PPV) event produced by World Championship Wrestling (WCW). The event took place on January 25, 1997 from the Five Seasons Center in Cedar Rapids, Iowa. The pay-per-view was presented by the nWo in storyline and the official title of the event was nWo Souled Out. It was an nWo-themed pay-per-view, with nWo official referee Nick Patrick officiating all of the matches by wearing an nWo T-shirt and cap and the group's members Eric Bischoff and Ted DiBiase providing commentary.

Eight matches were contested at the event and all the matches featured WCW roster versus nWo members. nWo leader Hollywood Hogan defended the WCW World Heavyweight Championship against WCW's The Giant in the main event as Giant invoked his title opportunity which he earned by winning the 1996 World War 3. The match ended in a no contest when the nWo referee Nick Patrick stopped counting the pinfall for Giant and the nWo members interfered to attack him.

The event generated 170,000 ppv buys.

== Storylines ==
The event involved professional wrestlers performing as heroic and villainous characters in scripted events pre-determined by the hosting promotion, WCW. Storylines between the characters played out on WCW's primary television programs, Monday Nitro, Saturday Night, WorldWide, Pro and Main Event.

nWo member The Giant won the World War 3 battle royal at the 1996 World War 3 by last eliminating Lex Luger, which entitled him to a WCW World Heavyweight Championship match at a place and time of his choosing. Giant demanded his title shot against the nWo leader, Hollywood Hogan on the Nitro after Starrcade but Hogan refused to give him a title shot and made fun of him for losing to Luger, the previous night at Starrcade. Later that night, the nWo attacked Roddy Piper due to Piper beating Hogan at Starrcade. Hogan ordered Giant to deliver a Chokeslam to Piper but Giant instead went for Hogan. Hogan agreed to give Giant, his title shot and then all the nWo members attacked Giant, thus kicking him out of the nWo. On the January 4 episode of Saturday Night, it was announced that Hogan would defend the WCW World Heavyweight Championship against Giant at Souled Out. On the January 13 episode of Nitro, Giant faced Hogan in a non-title match which ended when the nWo members attacked Giant.

At Starrcade, Eddie Guerrero defeated Diamond Dallas Page to win the vacant WCW United States Heavyweight Championship. Guerrero won the match after the nWo attacked Page. However, after the match, Guerrero confronted Syxx and The Outsiders for interfering in his match. The trio beat Guerrero and stole his newly won title belt. On the January 4 episode of Saturday Night, it was announced that Guerrero would defend the title against Syxx at Souled Out.

On the November 25 episode of Monday Nitro, Eric Bischoff gave an ultimatum to all the WCW roster that they would become targets of the nWo if they did not join the group until December 30. The American Males (Marcus Alexander Bagwell and Scotty Riggs) came to accept the offer. Riggs was hesitant to accept it while Bagwell accepted the offer and turned on Riggs, thus joining the nWo and breaking up American Males. This set up a match between Bagwell and Riggs at Souled Out.

== Event ==
Other on-screen personnel
Role:	Name:
Commentators	Eric Bischoff
Commentators	Ted DiBiase
Interviewer	Jeff Katz
Ring announcer	Neal Pruitt
Referees	Randy Anderson
Referees	Nick Patrick

=== Preliminary matches ===
The opening match of the event featured WCW representative Chris Jericho taking on nWo member Masahiro Chono, with nWo referee Nick Patrick officiating the match. After a back and forth action between the two men, Chono won the match by pushing Jericho from the top rope onto a table placed on the ringside. Chono delivered a Yakuza Kick to Jericho to win the match.

A Mexican Death match followed between WCW's Hugh Morrus and nWo's Big Bubba Rogers. Nick Patrick favored Bubba throughout the match, allowing him to take full advantage of the stipulations of the match, while threatened to disqualify Morrus if he tried to do so, allowing Bubba to use steel steps and a steel chain to gain advantage. Morrus grabbed away the chain and hit Bubba with it and then delivered a No Laughing Matter to Bubba. Patrick gave a very slow 10 count, which allowed Bubba to regain his senses and survive the count. The two men fought into the ring and then the action spilled to the outside, where Morrus missed a No Laughing Matter and Bubba ran him down with a motorcycle. Bubba returned to the ring while Morrus failed to beat the referee's 10 count. This gave nWo, the lead with two wins.

Jeff Jarrett took on Mr. Wallstreet from the nWo. As in the earlier matches of the night, Patrick continued to officiate the match in Wallstreet's advantage until Jarrett's tag team partner and member of The Four Horsemen, Steve McMichael came to the ringside. Jarrett gained momentum in the closing moments of the match by applying a figure four leglock on Wallstreet, but Patrick dragged him to the ropes to break the hold. McMichael nailed Wallstreet with a Halliburton, and then intimidated Patrick into allowing Jarrett to pin him for the win and giving WCW, the first victory of the night.

Buff Bagwell (nWo) and Scotty Riggs (WCW) faced in the fourth match of the night, stemming from Bagwell's betrayal of Riggs to join the nWo, thus breaking The American Males tag team. The two men had a lengthy match which ended with Bagwell delivering a Blockbuster to Riggs to win the match.

Diamond Dallas Page from WCW faced nWo's Scott Norton. Page dominated the match until Norton's nWo teammates Buff Bagwell, Big Bubba Rogers, Mr. Wallstreet and Vincent showed up at ringside and offered Page to join the nWo. Page apparently accepted the offer but then delivered a Diamond Cutter to Norton and fled the ring. He escaped through the crowd and got counted-out, thus giving Norton, the win by count-out.

nWo representatives The Outsiders (Scott Hall and Kevin Nash) defended the WCW World Tag Team Championship against Steiner Brothers (Rick Steiner and Scott Steiner) (WCW). Nick Patrick was knocked out by the end of the match as Hall knocked out Scott with an Outsider's Edge. Rick took advantage of the situation and delivered a diving bulldog to Hall. Scott leaned onto Hall for the pinfall and the WCW referee Randy Anderson rushed to the ring and counted the pinfall. As a result, Steiner Brothers won the World Tag Team Championship.

The final match on the undercard was a ladder match between Eddie Guerrero (WCW) and Syxx (nWo) for the WCW United States Heavyweight Championship. Syxx appeared with Guerrero's stolen title belt and attacked him with a spinning heel kick. The title was suspended on a hook. After a back and forth action, Guerrero won the match when both men climbed the ladder and retrieved the belt from the hook and then Guerrero hit Syxx with the title belt and knocked him down to the floor, thus retaining his title and regaining his United States Heavyweight Championship belt.

=== Main event match ===
The main event was a WCW World Heavyweight Championship match between the defending champion, nWo leader Hollywood Hogan and The Giant. Hogan was escorted to the ring by Nate Newton, Ray Donaldson and George Teague of the Dallas Cowboys. Both men traded moves and exchanged momentum throughout the match until Giant controlled the match by performing a Chokeslam on Hogan and covering him for the pinfall but Nick Patrick refused to count the pinfall. This angered Giant and he delivered a Chokeslam to Patrick as well. The nWo members rushed to the ring to attack Giant but he delivered Chokeslam to each member. Eric Bischoff handed a guitar to Hogan and Hogan nailed Giant with the guitar. As a result, the match ended in a no contest and Hogan retained his title.

== Aftermath ==
On the January 27 episode of Monday Nitro, Eric Bischoff fired Randy Anderson for counting the pinfall victory for the Steiner Brothers at Souled Out and stripped the Steiner Brothers of the WCW World Tag Team Championship as their title win was officiated by Anderson, who was a non-sanctioned referee at the event. Bischoff then returned the titles to The Outsiders. Later that night, The Giant defeated Roadblock and challenged Hollywood Hogan to a WCW World Heavyweight Championship rematch. Lex Luger declared his intent on siding with Giant against the nWo. Hogan was disqualified in the title match against Giant after outside interference by Outsiders but Luger came to Giant's rescue, setting up a title defense for Outsiders against Luger and Giant at SuperBrawl VII.

On the February 3 episode of Monday Nitro, Hogan challenged Roddy Piper to a match, in which he agreed to put his WCW World Heavyweight Championship on the line. Later that night, Piper and Hogan had a confrontation where Piper tried to leave the arena, but Hogan insulted Piper in front of his son Colt. After helping his son out of the ring, Piper stood up to Hogan and accepted the challenge for the match at Superbrawl.

== Results ==
No.	Results	Stipulations	Times
1	Masahiro Chono (nWo) defeated Chris Jericho (WCW)	Singles match	11:08
2	Big Bubba Rogers (nWo) defeated Hugh Morrus (WCW) (with Jimmy Hart)	Mexican Death match	09:03
3	Jeff Jarrett (WCW) defeated Mr. Wallstreet (nWo)	Singles match	09:22
4	Buff Bagwell (nWo) defeated Scotty Riggs (WCW)	Singles match	13:51
5	Scott Norton (nWo) defeated Diamond Dallas Page (WCW) via countout	Singles match	09:39
6	The Steiner Brothers (WCW) (Rick and Scott) defeated The Outsiders (nWo) (Kevin Nash and Scott Hall) (c)	Tag team match for the WCW World Tag Team Championship	14:43
7	Eddie Guerrero (WCW) (c) defeated Syxx (nWo)	Ladder match for the WCW United States Heavyweight Championship	13:50
8	Hollywood Hogan (nWo) (c) vs. The Giant (WCW) ended in a no contest	Singles match for the WCW World Heavyweight Championship	10:52
(c) / – the champion(s) heading into the match
