= List of New World Order members =

Members of professional wrestling stable, New World Order

The following is a list of members of the New World Order (nWo), a professional wrestling stable in World Championship Wrestling (WCW), New Japan Pro-Wrestling (NJPW), and World Wrestling Federation/Entertainment (WWF/WWE).

There were a total of 79 members of the group in its existence.

== Incarnations and members ==
=== WCW ===
Incarnation	Notes	Members
nWo; July 7, 1996 – April 27, 1998	The original heel incarnation was formed when Hulk Hogan defected from WCW to join the Outsiders, Scott Hall and Kevin Nash. The group was portrayed as being a separate entity, operating apart from WCW.	Scott Hall (founding member, sided briefly with nWo Wolfpac after the split, before defecting to nWo Hollywood with Dusty Rhodes); Kevin Nash (founding member, leader of nWo Wolfpac after split); Hulk Hogan/Hollywood Hogan (leader and founding member, leader of nWo Hollywood after split); Ted DiBiase (joined on the August 26, 1996, episode of Nitro, last seen accompanying the nWo on the April 21, 1997, episode of Nitro, leaving to manage the Steiner brothers); The Giant (joined on the September 2, 1996, episode of Nitro, expelled on the December 30, 1996, episode of Nitro); nWo Sting (joined on the September 9, 1996, episode of Nitro, became a member of nWo Japan and sided with nWo Hollywood after split); Syxx (joined on the September 16, 1996, episode of Nitro, injured on the October 13, 1997, episode of Nitro, and made his last WCW appearance on the November 16, 1997, episode of WorldWide before being fired from WCW in March 1998); Vincent (joined on the September 23, 1996, episode of Nitro, sided with nWo Hollywood after split); Miss Elizabeth (joined on the September 30, 1996, episode of Nitro, sided briefly with nWo Wolfpac after split, until defecting to nWo Hollywood); Eric Bischoff (joined on the November 18, 1996, episode of Nitro, sided with nWo Hollywood after split); Buff Bagwell (joined on the November 25, 1996, episode of Nitro, sided with nWo Hollywood after split); Michael Wallstreet (joined on the December 9, 1996, episode of Nitro, contractually removed from group on April 21, 1997. Was still a silent member and a member of nWo Japan); Big Bubba Rogers (joined on the December 16, 1996, episode of Nitro, injured and contractually removed from group on April 21, 1997); Scott Norton (joined on the December 16, 1996, episode of Nitro, sided with nWo Hollywood after split); Masahiro Chono (joined on the December 16, 1996, episode of Nitro, member of nWo Japan and sided with nWo Hollywood after split); Randy Savage (joined on February 23, 1997, at SuperBrawl VII, sided with nWo Wolfpac after split); Tenzan (joined in May 1997, member of nWo Japan and sided with nWo Hollywood after split); The Great Muta (joined on the May 26, 1997, episode of Nitro, member of nWo Japan and sided with nWo Hollywood after split); Konnan (joined on the July 14, 1997, episode of Nitro, sided briefly with nWo Hollywood after split, until defecting to nWo Wolfpac); Curt Hennig (joined on the September 14, 1997, at Fall Brawl, sided briefly with nWo Wolfpac after split, until defecting to nWo Hollywood with Rick Rude); Rick Rude (joined on the November 17, 1997, episode of Nitro, sided briefly with nWo Wolfpac after split, until defecting to nWo Hollywood with Curt Hennig); Dusty Rhodes (joined on January 24, 1998, at Souled Out, sided briefly with nWo Wolfpac after split, until defecting to nWo Hollywood with Scott Hall); Brian Adams (joined on the February 16, 1998, episode of Nitro, sided with nWo Hollywood after split); Scott Steiner (joined on February 22, 1998, at SuperBrawl VIII; sided with nWo Hollywood after split); The Disciple (joined on the February 23, 1998, episode of Nitro, sided with nWo Hollywood after split); Nick Patrick (referee; outed as a nWo referee on October 27, 1996, at Halloween Havoc, quit the nWo on the April 21, 1997, episode of Nitro)
nWo Hollywood (nWo Black & White); April 27, 1998 – January 4, 1999	Heel faction of the nWo formed when Kevin Nash and Randy Savage left the group and created the nWo Wolfpac, splitting the group in two.	Hollywood Hogan (leader and founding member; retired in November 1998; came back in January 1999; leader of nWo Elite after reunion); Eric Bischoff (founding member, part of nWo Elite after reunion); The Disciple (founding member, left the group on the September 21, 1998, episode of Nitro after being kidnapped by The Warrior and joined the oWn); Brian Adams (founding member; part of nWo B-Team after reunion); Konnan (founding member; defected to nWo Wolfpac on the May 4, 1998, episode of Nitro after Brian Adams walked out on him and Scott Steiner during a 3-on-3 tag match vs Luger, Sting and Giant on the April 27, 1998, episode of Nitro); Scott Steiner (founding member; leader of the group from November 1998 – January 1999 while Hogan was retired; part of nWo Elite after reunion); Scott Norton (founding member; part of nWo B-Team after reunion); Vincent (founding member; part of nWo B-Team after reunion); The Giant (joined on the May 11, 1998, episode of Nitro; part of nWo B-Team after reunion); Scott Hall (joined on May 17, 1998, at Slamboree with Dusty Rhodes; expelled on November 22, 1998, at World War 3; re joined Wolfpac right before reunion); Dusty Rhodes (joined on May 17, 1998, at Slamboree with Scott Hall; left the group on the November 30, 1998, episode of Nitro after Scott Hall was expelled); nWo Sting (only made occasional appearances from nWo Japan); Miss Elizabeth (joined on the June 8, 1998, episode of Nitro; part of nWo Elite after reunion); Curt Hennig (joined on June 14, 1998, at The Great American Bash with Rick Rude; part of nWo B-Team after reunion); Rick Rude (joined on June 14, 1998, at The Great American Bash with Curt Hennig; last appeared with the nWo at Fall Brawl); Buff Bagwell (injured when the split occurred; part of nWo Elite after reunion); Stevie Ray (joined on the August 24, 1998, episode of Nitro; part of nWo B-Team after reunion); Horace (joined on the October 26, 1998, episode of Nitro; part of nWo B-Team after reunion); Mark Johnson (nWo referee for Scott Steiner and Buff Bagwell starting at World War 3; last appeared with the nWo on January 4, 1999 at the reunion)
nWo Wolfpac (nWo Red & Black); April 27, 1998 – January 4, 1999	Face faction of the nWo formed when Kevin Nash and Randy Savage split the group in two.	Kevin Nash (leader and founding member; part of nWo Elite after reunion); Randy Savage (founding member; left the group on the December 28, 1998, episode of Nitro after assisting Ric Flair to defeat Eric Bischoff); Konnan (joined straight after the split on the May 4, 1998, episode of Nitro; expelled immediately after reunion); Curt Hennig (joined straight after the split on the May 4, 1998, episode of Nitro; defected to nWo Hollywood with Rick Rude on June 14, 1998, at The Great American Bash); Scott Hall (founding member despite being injured when the split occurred, defected to nWo Hollywood with Dusty Rhodes on May 17, 1998, at Slamboree); re joined Wolfpac and then part of nWo Elite after reunion); Dusty Rhodes (joined on the May 11, 1998, episode of Nitro; defected to nWo Hollywood with Scott Hall on May 17, 1998, at Slamboree); Miss Elizabeth (joined on May 17, 1998, at Slamboree; defected to nWo Hollywood on the June 8, 1998, episode of Nitro); Rick Rude (joined on the May 21, 1998, episode of Thunder; defected to nWo Hollywood with Curt Hennig on June 14, 1998); Lex Luger (joined on the May 25, 1998, episode of Nitro; part of nWo Elite after reunion); Sting (joined on the June 1, 1998, episode of Nitro; left the group on October 25, 1998, at Halloween Havoc due to rehab for drug issues); Disco Inferno (Associate of nWo Wolfpac but officially joined after the reunion, quietly left in May 1999)
nWo Elite (Wolfpac); January 4, 1999 – August 16, 1999	The nWo reunited as heels after the Fingerpoke of Doom, wrestling in the colors of nWo Wolfpac.	Hollywood Hogan (leader and founding member, left on August 9, 1999, episode of Nitro returning to Hulkamania and then on August 14, 1999, at Road Wild defeated Nash to end the nWo Wolfpac Elite.); Kevin Nash (founding member, forced to retire on August 14, 1999, at Road Wild after losing to Hogan in a retirement match which was the end of nWo Wolfpac Elite.); Scott Hall (founding member, injured on March 14, 1999, and on the March 18, 1999, episode of Thunder was stripped of the WCW United States championship); Eric Bischoff (founding member, left the group in May 1999 to focus on the WCW brand); Scott Steiner (founding member, injured in June 1999 and stripped of the WCW United States championship); Konnan (founding member, expelled on the January 11, 1999, episode of Nitro); Buff Bagwell (founding member, expelled on the March 15, 1999, episode of Nitro); Lex Luger (founding member, left the group on May 17, 1999, episode of Nitro to help Sting); Miss Elizabeth (founding member, left the group in May 1999 with Lex Luger); Torrie Wilson (joined with David Flair; David Flair (joined on February 21, 1999, at SuperBrawl IX, left in May 1999 with Torrie Wilson, to reconcile with his father Ric Flair); Disco Inferno (Left in May 1999)
nWo Black & White (nWo B-Team); January 7, 1999 – August 28, 1999	Heel grouping of lower card members who were never fully inducted into nWo Elite. Labeled as "nWo B-Team" by fans and commentators, wrestling in the colors of nWo Black and White.	Stevie Ray (leader and founding member, left the group on July 29, 1999 episode of Thunder to reform Harlem Heat); The Giant (founding member, expelled straight after the reunion on the January 11, 1999, episode of Nitro); Curt Hennig (founding member, expelled on the January 25, 1999, episode of Nitro); Vincent (founding member, changed his name to Vince); Scott Norton (founding member); Brian Adams (founding member, expelled on the August 16, 1999, episode of Nitro); Horace (founding member)
nWo 2000; December 20, 1999 – April 10, 2000. August 28, 2000 - October 4, 2000.	The group was reformed as heels under Bret Hart using a silver and black logo and the catchphrase, "The Band is Back Together". (Vince Russo briefly re formed the group four months after disbanding bringing Kevin Nash, Jeff Jarrett and Scott Steiner with cameos from Bret Hart back together under the nickname “The Band” using the Wolfpac theme)	Bret Hart (leader and founding member, left the group on January 16, 2000, at Souled Out, due to injury); Kevin Nash (founding member, became WCW commissioner and leader of the group after Bret Hart was injured, left the group on February 23, 2000, episode of Thunder following Scott Hall's departure. Also stripped of the WCW commissioner role due to injury); Jeff Jarrett (founding member, became leader of the group after SuperBrawl taking over from Kevin Nash); Scott Hall (founding member, left the group on February 20, 2000, at SuperBrawl before being fired from WCW); Scott Steiner (joined on the December 27, 1999, episode of Nitro); Midajah (nWo Girl, joined in December 1999); April Hunter (nWo Girl, joined in December 1999); Major Gunns (nWo Girl, joined in December 1999); Pamela Paulshock (nWo Girl, joined in December 1999); Shakira (nWo Girl, joined in December 1999); Ron and Don Harris (nWo bodyguards, officially joined the group on the January 31, 2000, episode of Nitro); Mark Johnson (nWo referee again, joined in February 2000)

=== NJPW ===
Incarnation	Notes	Members
nWo Japan; December 1996 – February 8, 2000	Also known as nWo Gundam (heels under Masahiro Chono, faces under Keiji Muto)	Masahiro Chono (leader and founding member, left the group in August 1998 due to injury); Hiro Saito (founding member); Hiroyoshi Tenzan (founding member); nWo Sting (joined in February 1997, left the group in February 1999); Scott Norton (joined in February 1997 and toured Japan on a regular basis); Buff Bagwell (joined in February 1997 for several tours in 1997); Keiji Muto/The Great Muta (joined in May 1997, became leader after Chono suffered an injury); Michael Wallstreet (joined in May 1997, left the group in February 1999); Scott Hall (joined for one tour in May 1997); Kevin Nash (joined for one tour in May 1997); Syxx (joined for one tour in May 1997); Big Titan (joined in September 1997, left the group in April 1999 due to injury); Brian Adams (joined in September 1998 for several tours until August 1999); Satoshi Kojima (joined in October 1998); Yuji Nagata (made one appearance as a member of nWo Japan, replacing Buff Bagwell during a WCW house show); Masa Saito (nWo Japan announcer)

=== WWF/WWE ===
Incarnation:	Notes	Members
nWo; February 17, 2002 – July 15, 2002	The nWo were brought into the WWF by owner Vince McMahon as heels	Hollywood Hulk Hogan (leader and founding member; reformed the nWo on February 17, 2002, at No Way Out; expelled on March 18, 2002, episode of Raw); Kevin Nash (founding member; reformed the nWo on February 17, 2002, at No Way Out; and later leader after taking over from Hollywood Hulk Hogan); Scott Hall (founding member; reformed the nWo on February 17, 2002, at No Way Out; expelled on the May 13, 2002, episode of Raw); X-Pac (joined on the March 21, 2002, episode of SmackDown!); Big Show (joined on the April 22, 2002, episode of Raw); Booker T (joined on the May 13, 2002, episode of Raw; expelled on the June 10, 2002, episode of Raw); Shawn Michaels (joined on the June 3, 2002, episode of Raw)

=== Celebrities ===
Celebrity members:
- Kyle Petty (NASCAR driver; joined on the September 23, 1996, episode of Nitro, last ran nWo race car on September 5, 1997)
- Dennis Rodman (Chicago Bulls basketball player; joined on the March 10, 1997 episode of Nitro and last appeared August 9, 1997, later rejoined with nWo Hollywood in 1998)
- Paul Gilmartin (Dinner and a Movie host; one night only member, joined August 21, 1997, at Clash of the Champions XXXV)
- Claud Mann (Dinner and a Movie chef; one night only member, joined August 21, 1997, at Clash of the Champions XXXV)
- Daisuke Miura (Yokohama BayStars baseball player; joined nWo Japan on January 4, 1998 at Final Power Hall in Tokyo Dome)
- Takanori Suzuki (Yokohama BayStars baseball player; joined nWo Japan on January 4, 1998 at Final Power Hall in Tokyo Dome)
- Takashi Manei (Yokohama BayStars baseball player; joined nWo Japan on January 4, 1998 at Final Power Hall in Tokyo Dome)
- Jun Inoue (Yokohama BayStars baseball player; joined nWo Japan on January 4, 1998 at Final Power Hall in Tokyo Dome)
- Masahiro Yamamoto (Chunichi Dragons baseball player; nWo Japan member)
- Takeshi Yamasaki (Chunichi Dragons baseball player; nWo Japan member)
- Yukinaga Maeda (Chunichi Dragons baseball player; nWo Japan member)
- Masashi Nakayama (Júbilo Iwata soccer player; nWo Japan member)
- Masayuki Okano (Urawa Reds soccer player; nWo Japan member)
- Chiyotaikai Ryūji (Sumo wrestler; nWo Japan member)
- Toshimasa Yoshioka (Keirin cyclist; nWo Japan member)
- Yūji Yamada (Keirin cyclist; nWo Japan member)
- Koji Yamaguchi (Keirin cyclist; nWo Japan member)
- Daita (Guitarist for Siam Shade; nWo Japan member)
- Yoshinari Tsuji (TV Asahi announcer; nWo Japan member)
- Tsuyoshi Kusanagi (Actor and singer; nWo Japan member)
- Yūsuke Santamaria (Actor and singer; nWo Japan member)

== Sub-groups ==
Affiliate	Members	Tenure	Type	Promotion(s)
The Wolfpac / The Band	Kevin Nash; Scott Hall; Syxx/X-Pac	1996–1997; 2002 2010	Trio	WCW; WWF/WWE; TNA
The Outsiders	Kevin Nash; Scott Hall	1996–1999; 2002	Tag team	WCW; WWF/WWE
Vicious and Delicious	Scott Norton; Buff Bagwell	1996–1998	Tag team	WCW
Sting and Lex Luger	Sting; Lex Luger	1998	Tag team	WCW
Harris Brothers	Ron Harris; Don Harris	1999–2000	Tag team	WCW
