= List of JCP/WCW closed-circuit events and pay-per-view events =

Listing of closed-circuit television and pay-per-view events from WCW and NWA

This is a list of all closed-circuit television and pay-per-view events held by Jim Crockett Promotions (JCP) and its successor World Championship Wrestling (WCW).

From 1983 to 1987, these events aired live on closed-circuit television under the National Wrestling Alliance (NWA) banner. Beginning in 1987, the events would air live on pay-per-view television. In November 1988, JCP sold its assets to the Turner Broadcasting System, which rebranded the company as World Championship Wrestling; they later left the NWA in 1991. In 1998 and early 1999, PPV events were promoted using the dual WCW/nWo brands.

In 2001, the World Wrestling Federation (now known as WWE) purchased the assets of WCW, including the video libraries of all previous NWA and WCW pay-per-views, and the ownership rights of the names of these events. To date WWE has only promoted one pay-per-view event using the name of a former WCW PPV, The Great American Bash, from 2004 until 2009. In 2012, it was rebooted as a live WWE SmackDown special and in 2020, it was used as a two-week show as part of the NXT brand followed in 2021 by a special episode on one night. Also in 2020, the Halloween Havoc event name would be revived, once again as a special episode of NXT. In 2017, WWE revived the Starrcade name for a non-televised house show and then would show a portion of the 2018 and 2019 iterations of the event on the WWE Network. Both The Great American Bash and Halloween Havoc names would rotate between special episodes and live streaming events as WWE ceased airing NXT pay-per-views from 2022 and has aired solely on the WWE Network and Peacock.

Beginning in 2014, nearly all NWA and WCW pay-per-view events were made available on the WWE Network and Peacock.

== Jim Crockett Promotions closed-circuit television events ==
=== 1983 ===
Date	Event	Venue	Location	Main event
November 24	Starrcade '83: A Flare for the Gold	Greensboro Coliseum	Greensboro, North Carolina	Harley Race (c) vs. Ric Flair in a steel cage match for the NWA World Heavyweight Championship with Gene Kiniski as special guest referee
(c) – refers to the champion(s) heading into the match

=== 1984 ===
Date	Event	Venue	Location	Main event
November 22	Starrcade '84: The Million Dollar Challenge	Greensboro Coliseum	Greensboro, North Carolina	Ric Flair (c) vs. Dusty Rhodes for the NWA World Heavyweight Championship with Joe Frazier as special guest referee
(c) – refers to the champion(s) heading into the match

=== 1985 ===
Date	Event	Venue	Location	Main event
November 28	Starrcade '85: The Gathering	Greensboro Coliseum; The Omni	Greensboro, North Carolina; Atlanta, Georgia	Ric Flair (c) vs. Dusty Rhodes for the NWA World Heavyweight Championship
(c) – refers to the champion(s) heading into the match

=== 1986 ===
Date	Event	Venue	Location	Main event
November 27	Starrcade '86: The Skywalkers	Greensboro Coliseum; The Omni	Greensboro, North Carolina; Atlanta, Georgia	Ric Flair (c) vs. Nikita Koloff for the NWA World Heavyweight Championship
(c) – refers to the champion(s) heading into the match

== Jim Crockett Promotions pay-per-view events ==
=== 1987 ===
Date	Event	Venue	Location	Main event
November 26	Starrcade '87: Chi-Town Heat	UIC Pavilion	Chicago, Illinois	Ron Garvin (c) vs. Ric Flair in a steel cage match for the NWA World Heavyweight Championship
(c) – refers to the champion(s) heading into the match

=== 1988 ===
Date	Event	Venue	Location	Main event
January 24	The Bunkhouse Stampede Finals	Nassau Coliseum	Uniondale, New York	Dusty Rhodes vs. Arn Anderson vs. The Barbarian vs. Tully Blanchard vs. Ivan Koloff vs. Lex Luger vs. Road Warrior Animal vs. The Warlord in the Bunkhouse Stampede
July 10	The Great American Bash	Baltimore Arena	Baltimore, Maryland	Ric Flair (c) vs. Lex Luger for the NWA World Heavyweight Championship
(c) – refers to the champion(s) heading into the match

== NWA (World Championship Wrestling) pay-per-view events ==
=== 1988 ===
Date	Event	Venue	Location	Main event
December 26	Starrcade '88: True Gritt	Norfolk Scope	Norfolk, Virginia	Ric Flair (c) vs. Lex Luger for the NWA World Heavyweight Championship
(c) – refers to the champion(s) heading into the match

=== 1989 ===
Date	Event	Venue	Location	Main event
February 20	Chi-Town Rumble	UIC Pavilion	Chicago, Illinois	Ric Flair (c) vs. Ricky Steamboat for the NWA World Heavyweight Championship
May 7	WrestleWar '89: Music City Showdown	Nashville Municipal Auditorium	Nashville, Tennessee	Eddie Gilbert and Rick Steiner (c) vs. The Varsity Club (Dan Spivey and Kevin Sullivan for the NWA United States Tag Team Championship
July 23	The Great American Bash	Baltimore Arena	Baltimore, Maryland	Ric Flair (c) vs. Terry Funk for the NWA World Heavyweight Championship
October 28	Halloween Havoc	Philadelphia Civic Center	Philadelphia, Pennsylvania	Ric Flair and Sting vs. The Great Muta and Terry Funk in a Thunderdome match with Bruno Sammartino as special guest referee
December 13	Starrcade '89: Future Shock	The Omni	Atlanta, Georgia	Ric Flair vs. Sting in an Iron Man tournament match
(c) – refers to the champion(s) heading into the match

=== 1990 ===
Date	Event	Venue	Location	Main event
February 25	WrestleWar '90: Wild Thing	Greensboro Coliseum	Greensboro, North Carolina	Ric Flair (c) vs. Lex Luger for the NWA World Heavyweight Championship
May 19	Capital Combat	D.C. Armory	Washington, D.C.	Ric Flair (c) vs. Lex Luger in a Steel Cage match for the NWA World Heavyweight Championship
July 7	The Great American Bash	Baltimore Arena	Baltimore, Maryland	Ric Flair (c) vs. Sting for the NWA World Heavyweight Championship
October 27	Halloween Havoc	UIC Pavilion	Chicago, Illinois	Sting (c) vs. Sid Vicious for the NWA World Heavyweight Championship
December 16	Starrcade '90: Collision Course	Kiel Auditorium	St. Louis, Missouri	Sting (c) vs. The Black Scorpion in a Steel Cage match for the NWA World Heavyweight Championship and to create the new WCW World Heavyweight Championship
(c) – refers to the champion(s) heading into the match

== WCW pay-per-view events ==
=== 1991 ===
Date	Event	Venue	Location	Main event	Notes	Ref
February 24	WrestleWar '91	Arizona Veterans Memorial Coliseum	Phoenix, Arizona	Larry Zbyszko and The Four Horsemen (Barry Windham, Ric Flair and Sid Vicious) vs. Brian Pillman, Sting and The Steiner Brothers (Rick Steiner and Scott Steiner) in a WarGames match		
March 21 (aired April)	WCW/New Japan Supershow I	Tokyo Dome	Tokyo, Japan	Tatsumi Fujinami (IWGP) vs. Ric Flair (NWA/WCW) in a Title-for-Title match for the IWGP Heavyweight Championship and the WCW and NWA World Heavyweight Championships	Co-produced with New Japan Pro-Wrestling	
May 19	SuperBrawl I	Bayfront Arena	St. Petersburg, Florida	Ric Flair (WCW) vs. Tatsumi Fujinami (NWA) for the WCW World Heavyweight Championship and the NWA World Heavyweight Championship		
July 14	The Great American Bash	Baltimore Arena	Baltimore, Maryland	Rick Steiner vs. Arn Anderson and Paul E. Dangerously in a Steel Cage match		
October 27	Halloween Havoc	UTC Arena	Chattanooga, Tennessee	Lex Luger (c) vs. Ron Simmons in a two-out-of-three falls match for the WCW World Heavyweight Championship		
December 29	Starrcade '91: Battlebowl – The Lethal Lottery	Norfolk Scope	Norfolk, Virginia	Battlebowl Battle Royal		
(c) – refers to the champion(s) heading into the match

=== 1992 ===
Date	Event	Venue	Location	Main event	Notes	Ref
January 4 (aired March)	WCW/New Japan Supershow II	Tokyo Dome	Tokyo, Japan	Sting and The Great Muta vs. The Steiner Brothers (Rick Steiner and Scott Steiner)	Co-produced with New Japan Pro-Wrestling	
February 29	SuperBrawl II	Milwaukee Theatre at the MECCA	Milwaukee, Wisconsin	Lex Luger (c) vs. Sting for the WCW World Heavyweight Championship		
May 17	WrestleWar '92	Jacksonville Memorial Coliseum	Jacksonville, Florida	Sting's Squadron (Barry Windham, Dustin Rhodes, Nikita Koloff, Ricky Steamboat and Sting) vs. The Dangerous Alliance (Arn Anderson, Bobby Eaton, Larry Zbyszko, Rick Rude and Steve Austin) in a WarGames match		
June 20	Beach Blast	Mobile Civic Center	Mobile, Alabama	The Steiner Brothers (Rick Steiner and Scott Steiner) (c) vs. The Miracle Violence Connection (Steve Williams and Terry Gordy) for the WCW World Tag Team Championship		
July 12	The Great American Bash	Albany Civic Center	Albany, Georgia	The Miracle Violence Connection (Steve Williams and Terry Gordy) vs. Barry Windham and Dustin Rhodes in a tournament final for the vacant NWA World Tag Team Championship		
October 25	Halloween Havoc	Philadelphia Civic Center	Philadelphia, Pennsylvania	Sting vs. Jake Roberts in a coal miner's glove match		
December 28	Starrcade '92: Battlebowl – The Lethal Lottery II	The Omni	Atlanta, Georgia	Battlebowl Battle Royal		
(c) – refers to the champion(s) heading into the match

=== 1993 ===
Date	Event	Venue	Location	Main event	Notes	Ref
January 4 (aired March)	WCW/New Japan Supershow III	Tokyo Dome	Tokyo, Japan	Sting vs. Hiroshi Hase	Co-produced with New Japan Pro-Wrestling	
February 21	SuperBrawl III	Asheville Civic Center	Asheville, North Carolina	Big Van Vader vs. Sting in a White Castle of Fear Strap match		
May 23	Slamboree '93: A Legends' Reunion	The Omni	Atlanta, Georgia	Big Van Vader (c) vs. Davey Boy Smith for the WCW World Heavyweight Championship		
July 18	Beach Blast	Mississippi Coast Coliseum	Biloxi, Mississippi	The Superpowers (Davey Boy Smith and Sting) vs. The Masters of the Powerbomb (Big Van Vader and Sid Vicious)		
September 19	Fall Brawl '93: War Games	Astro Arena	Houston, Texas	The Superpowers (Sting and Davey Boy Smith), Dustin Rhodes, and The Shockmaster vs. Harlem Heat (Kole and Kane) and The Masters of the Powerbomb (Big Van Vader and Sid Vicious) in a WarGames match		
October 24	Halloween Havoc	Lakefront Arena	New Orleans, Louisiana	Big Van Vader vs. Cactus Jack in a Texas Deathmatch		
November 20	Battlebowl	Pensacola Civic Center	Pensacola, Florida	Battlebowl Battle Royal		
December 27	Starrcade '93: 10th Anniversary	Independence Arena	Charlotte, North Carolina	Big Van Vader (c) vs. Ric Flair in a title vs. career match for the WCW World Heavyweight Championship		
(c) – refers to the champion(s) heading into the match

=== 1994 ===
Date	Event	Venue	Location	Main event	Notes	Ref
February 20	SuperBrawl IV	Albany Civic Center	Albany, Georgia	Ric Flair (c) vs. Vader in a Thundercage match for the WCW World Heavyweight Championship		
April 17	Spring Stampede	Rosemont Horizon	Rosemont, Illinois	Ric Flair (c) vs. Ricky Steamboat for the WCW World Heavyweight Championship		
May 22	Slamboree '94: A Legends' Reunion	Philadelphia Civic Center	Philadelphia, Pennsylvania	Sting vs. Vader for the vacant WCW International World Heavyweight Championship		
July 17	Bash at the Beach	Orlando Arena	Orlando, Florida	Ric Flair (c) vs. Hulk Hogan for the WCW World Heavyweight Championship		
September 18	Fall Brawl '94: War Games	Roanoke Civic Center	Roanoke, Virginia	The Stud Stable (Arn Anderson, Bunkhouse Buck, Col. Robert Parker and Terry Funk) vs. Dustin Rhodes, Dusty Rhodes and The Nasty Boys (Brian Knobbs and Jerry Sags) in a WarGames match		
October 23	Halloween Havoc	Joe Louis Arena	Detroit, Michigan	Hulk Hogan (c) vs. Ric Flair in a Steel Cage match for the WCW World Heavyweight Championship with Mr. T as special guest referee		
November 6	When Worlds Collide	Los Angeles, California	Los Angeles Memorial Sports Arena	Perro Aguayo vs. Konnan in a steel cage match	Co-produced with Asistencia, Asesoría y Administración de Espectáculos	
December 27	Starrcade '94: Triple Threat	Nashville Municipal Auditorium	Nashville, Tennessee	Hulk Hogan (c) vs. The Butcher for the WCW World Heavyweight Championship		
(c) – refers to the champion(s) heading into the match

=== 1995 ===
Date	Event	Venue	Location	Main event	Notes	Ref
February 19	SuperBrawl V	Baltimore Arena	Baltimore, Maryland	Hulk Hogan (c) vs. Vader for the WCW World Heavyweight Championship		
March 19	Uncensored	Tupelo Coliseum	Tupelo, Mississippi	Hulk Hogan vs. Vader in a Leather Strap match		
April 28–29 (aired August 4)	Collision in Korea	May Day Stadium	Pyongyang, North Korea	Antonio Inoki vs. Ric Flair	Co-produced with New Japan Pro-Wrestling	
May 21	Slamboree '95: A Legends' Reunion	Bayfront Arena	St. Petersburg, Florida	The Mega Powers (Hulk Hogan and Randy Savage) vs. Ric Flair and Vader		
June 18	The Great American Bash	Hara Arena	Dayton, Ohio	Randy Savage vs. Ric Flair		
July 16	Bash at the Beach	"The Beach"	Huntington Beach, California	Hulk Hogan (c) vs. Vader in a Steel Cage match for the WCW World Heavyweight Championship		
September 17	Fall Brawl '95: War Games	Asheville Civic Center	Asheville, North Carolina	Hulk Hogan, Lex Luger, Randy Savage and Sting vs. The Dungeon of Doom (Kamala, Meng, Shark and Zodiac) in a WarGames match		
October 29	Halloween Havoc	Joe Louis Arena	Detroit, Michigan	Hulk Hogan (c) vs. The Giant for the WCW World Heavyweight Championship		
November 26	World War 3	Norfolk Scope	Norfolk, Virginia	60-man World War 3 Battle Royal		
December 27	Starrcade '95: World Cup of Wrestling	Nashville Municipal Auditorium	Nashville, Tennessee	Randy Savage (c) vs. Ric Flair for the WCW World Heavyweight Championship		
(c) – refers to the champion(s) heading into the match

=== 1996 ===
Date	Event	Venue	Location	Main event
February 11	SuperBrawl VI	Bayfront Arena	St. Petersburg, Florida	Hulk Hogan vs. The Giant in a Steel Cage match
March 24	Uncensored	Tupelo Coliseum	Tupelo, Mississippi	THe Alliance to End Hulkamania (Ric Flair, Arn Anderson, Meng, The Barbarian, Lex Luger, The Taskmaster, Z-Gangsta and The Ultimate Solution) vs. The Mega Powers (Hulk Hogan and Randy Savage) in a Doomsday Cage match
May 19	Slamboree	Riverside Centroplex	Baton Rouge, Louisiana	The Giant (c) vs. Sting for the WCW World Heavyweight Championship
June 16	The Great American Bash	Baltimore Arena	Baltimore, Maryland	The Giant (c) vs. Lex Luger for the WCW World Heavyweight Championship
July 7	Bash at the Beach	Ocean Center	Daytona Beach, Florida	Hulk Hogan and The Outsiders (Kevin Nash and Scott Hall) vs. Randy Savage, Sting and Lex Luger
August 10	Hog Wild	Sturgis Motorcycle Rally	Sturgis, South Dakota	The Giant (c) vs. Hollywood Hogan for the WCW World Heavyweight Championship
September 15	Fall Brawl '96: War Games	Lawrence Joel Veterans Memorial Coliseum	Winston-Salem, North Carolina	Team WCW (Arn Anderson, Lex Luger, Ric Flair and Sting) vs. nWo (Hollywood Hogan, Kevin Nash, nWo Sting and Scott Hall) in a WarGames match
October 27	Halloween Havoc	MGM Grand Garden Arena	Paradise, Nevada	Hollywood Hogan (c) vs. Randy Savage for the WCW World Heavyweight Championship
November 24	World War 3	Norfolk Scope	Norfolk, Virginia	60-man World War 3 Battle Royal
December 29	Starrcade	Nashville Municipal Auditorium	Nashville, Tennessee	Hollywood Hogan vs. Roddy Piper
(c) – refers to the champion(s) heading into the match

=== 1997 ===
nWo-branded event

Date	Event	Venue	Location	Main event
January 25	Souled Out	Five Seasons Center	Cedar Rapids, Iowa	Hollywood Hogan (c) vs. The Giant for the WCW World Heavyweight Championship
February 23	SuperBrawl VII	Cow Palace	Daly City, California	Hollywood Hogan (c) vs. Roddy Piper for the WCW World Heavyweight Championship
March 16	Uncensored	North Charleston Coliseum	North Charleston, South Carolina	Team Piper (Chris Benoit, Jeff Jarrett, Roddy Piper and Steve McMichael) vs. Team WCW (Lex Luger, Rick Steiner, Scott Steiner, and The Giant) vs. nWo (Hollywood Hogan, Kevin Nash, Randy Savage and Scott Hall) in a Triangle Elimination match
April 6	Spring Stampede	Tupelo Coliseum	Tupelo, Mississippi	Diamond Dallas Page vs. Randy Savage in a No Disqualification match
May 18	Slamboree	Independence Arena	Charlotte, North Carolina	Kevin Greene, Ric Flair and Roddy Piper vs. nWo (Kevin Nash, Scott Hall and Syxx)
June 15	The Great American Bash	The MARK of the Quad Cities	Moline, Illinois	Diamond Dallas Page vs. Randy Savage in a Falls Count Anywhere match
July 13	Bash at the Beach	Ocean Center	Daytona Beach, Florida	Dennis Rodman and Hollywood Hogan vs. Lex Luger and The Giant
August 9	Road Wild	Sturgis Motorcycle Rally	Sturgis, South Dakota	Lex Luger (c) vs. Hollywood Hogan for the WCW World Heavyweight Championship
September 14	Fall Brawl '97: War Games	Lawrence Joel Veterans Memorial Coliseum	Winston-Salem, North Carolina	The Four Horsemen (Chris Benoit, Curt Hennig, Ric Flair and Steve McMichael) vs. The nWo (Buff Bagwell, Kevin Nash, Konnan and Syxx) in a WarGames match
October 26	Halloween Havoc	MGM Grand Garden Arena	Paradise, Nevada	Hollywood Hogan vs. Roddy Piper in a Steel Cage match
November 23	World War 3	The Palace of Auburn Hills	Auburn Hills, Michigan	60-man World War 3 Battle Royal
December 28	Starrcade	MCI Center	Washington, D.C.	Hollywood Hogan (c) vs. Sting for the WCW World Heavyweight Championship
(c) – refers to the champion(s) heading into the match

=== 1998 ===
WCW/nWo co-branded event

Date	Event	Venue	Location	Main event
January 24	Souled Out	Hara Arena	Dayton, Ohio	Lex Luger vs. Randy Savage
February 22	SuperBrawl VIII	Cow Palace	Daly City, California	Hollywood Hogan vs. Sting for the vacant WCW World Heavyweight Championship
March 15	Uncensored	Mobile Civic Center	Mobile, Alabama	Hollywood Hogan vs. Randy Savage in a Steel Cage match
April 19	Spring Stampede	Denver Coliseum	Denver, Colorado	Sting vs. Randy Savage in a No Disqualification match for the WCW World Heavyweight Championship
May 17	Slamboree	The Centrum	Worcester, Massachusetts	The Outsiders (Kevin Nash and Scott Hall) (c) vs. Sting and The Giant for the WCW World Tag Team Championship
June 14	The Great American Bash	Baltimore Arena	Baltimore, Maryland	Sting (c) vs. The Giant (c) for control of the WCW World Tag Team Championship
July 12	Bash at the Beach	Cox Arena	San Diego, California	Dennis Rodman and Hollywood Hogan vs. Diamond Dallas Page and Karl Malone
August 8	Road Wild	Sturgis Motorcycle Rally	Sturgis, South Dakota	Diamond Dallas Page and Jay Leno vs. Eric Bischoff and Hollywood Hogan
September 13	Fall Brawl '98: War Games	Lawrence Joel Veterans Memorial Coliseum	Winston-Salem, North Carolina	Team WCW (Diamond Dallas Page, Roddy Piper and The Warrior) vs. nWo Hollywood (Bret Hart, Hollywood Hogan and Stevie Ray) vs. nWo Wolfpac (Kevin Nash, Lex Luger and Sting) in a WarGames match
October 25	Halloween Havoc	MGM Grand Garden Arena	Paradise, Nevada	Goldberg (c) vs. Diamond Dallas Page for the WCW World Heavyweight Championship
November 22	World War 3	The Palace of Auburn Hills	Auburn Hills, Michigan	Diamond Dallas Page (c) vs. Bret Hart for the WCW United States Heavyweight Championship
December 27	Starrcade	MCI Center	Washington, D.C.	Goldberg (c) vs. Kevin Nash for the WCW World Heavyweight Championship
(c) – refers to the champion(s) heading into the match

=== 1999 ===
WCW/nWo co-branded event

Date	Event	Venue	Location	Main event
January 17	Souled Out	Charleston Civic Center	Charleston, West Virginia	Goldberg vs. Scott Hall in a Stun Gun ladder match
February 21	SuperBrawl IX	Oakland Arena	Oakland, California	Hollywood Hogan (c) vs. Ric Flair for the WCW World Heavyweight Championship
March 14	Uncensored	Freedom Hall	Louisville, Kentucky	Hollywood Hogan (c) vs. Ric Flair in a Barbed Wire Steel Cage First Blood match for the WCW World Heavyweight Championship
April 11	Spring Stampede	Tacoma Dome	Tacoma, Washington	Ric Flair (c) vs. Diamond Dallas Page vs. Hollywood Hogan vs. Sting for the WCW World Heavyweight Championship with Randy Savage as special guest referee
May 9	Slamboree	TWA Dome	St. Louis, Missouri	Diamond Dallas Page (c) vs. Kevin Nash for the WCW World Heavyweight Championship
June 13	The Great American Bash	Baltimore Arena	Baltimore, Maryland	Kevin Nash (c) vs. Randy Savage for the WCW World Heavyweight Championship
July 11	Bash at the Beach	National Car Rental Center	Fort Lauderdale, Florida	Kevin Nash (c) and Sting vs. Randy Savage and Sid Vicious for the WCW World Heavyweight Championship
August 14	Road Wild	Sturgis Motorcycle Rally	Sturgis, South Dakota	Hulk Hogan (c) vs. Kevin Nash in a Retirement match for the WCW World Heavyweight Championship
September 12	Fall Brawl	Lawrence Joel Veterans Memorial Coliseum	Winston-Salem, North Carolina	Hulk Hogan (c) vs. Sting for the WCW World Heavyweight Championship
October 24	Halloween Havoc	MGM Grand Garden Arena	Paradise, Nevada	Sting (c) vs. Goldberg for the WCW World Heavyweight Championship
November 21	Mayhem	Air Canada Centre	Toronto, Ontario, Canada	Bret Hart vs. Chris Benoit in a tournament final for the vacant WCW World Heavyweight Championship
December 19	Starrcade	MCI Center	Washington, D.C.	Bret Hart (c) vs. Goldberg in a No Disqualification match for the WCW World Heavyweight Championship
(c) – refers to the champion(s) heading into the match

=== 2000 ===
Date	Event	Venue	Location	Main event
January 16	Souled Out	Firstar Center	Cincinnati, Ohio	Sid Vicious vs. Chris Benoit for the vacant WCW World Heavyweight Championship with Arn Anderson as special guest referee
February 20	SuperBrawl 2000	Cow Palace	Daly City, California	Sid Vicious (c) vs. Jeff Jarrett vs. Scott Hall for the WCW World Heavyweight Championship
March 19	Uncensored	American Airlines Arena	Miami, Florida	Hulk Hogan vs. Ric Flair in a Yappapi Indian Strap match
April 16	Spring Stampede	United Center	Chicago, Illinois	Diamond Dallas Page vs. Jeff Jarrett in a tournament final for the vacant WCW World Heavyweight Championship
May 7	Slamboree	Kemper Arena	Kansas City, Missouri	David Arquette (c) vs. Diamond Dallas Page vs. Jeff Jarrett in a Triple Cage match for the WCW World Heavyweight Championship
June 11	The Great American Bash	Baltimore Arena	Baltimore, Maryland	Jeff Jarrett (c) vs. Kevin Nash for the WCW World Heavyweight Championship
July 9	Bash at the Beach	Ocean Center	Daytona Beach, Florida	Jeff Jarrett (c) vs. Booker T for the WCW World Heavyweight Championship
August 13	New Blood Rising	Pacific Coliseum	Vancouver, British Columbia, Canada	Booker T (c) vs. Jeff Jarrett for the WCW World Heavyweight Championship
September 17	Fall Brawl	HSBC Arena	Buffalo, New York	Kevin Nash (c) vs. Booker T in a Caged Heat match for the WCW World Heavyweight Championship
October 29	Halloween Havoc	MGM Grand Garden Arena	Paradise, Nevada	Goldberg vs. KroniK (Brian Adams and Bryan Clark)
November 16	Millennium Final	Arena Oberhausen	Oberhausen, Germany	Sting vs. Kevin Nash for the WCW European Cup with Axel Schulz as special guest referee
November 26	Mayhem	Wisconsin Center Arena	Milwaukee, Wisconsin	Scott Steiner (c) vs. Booker T in a Straitjacket Caged Heat match for the WCW World Heavyweight Championship
December 17	Starrcade	MCI Center	Washington, D.C.	Scott Steiner (c) vs. Sid Vicious for the WCW World Heavyweight Championship
(c) – refers to the champion(s) heading into the match

=== 2001 ===
Date	Event	Venue	Location	Main event
January 14	Sin	Conseco Fieldhouse	Indianapolis, Indiana	Scott Steiner (c) vs. Jeff Jarrett vs. Sid Vicious vs. Road Warrior Animal for the WCW World Heavyweight Championship
February 18	SuperBrawl Revenge	Nashville Municipal Auditorium	Nashville, Tennessee	Scott Steiner (c) vs. Kevin Nash in a Two-out-of-Three Falls Loser Leaves WCW match for the WCW World Heavyweight Championship
March 18	Greed	Jacksonville Memorial Coliseum	Jacksonville, Florida	Scott Steiner (c) vs. Diamond Dallas Page in a Falls Count Anywhere match for the WCW World Heavyweight Championship
(c) – refers to the champion(s) heading into the match

== See also ==
- Clash of the Champions
- List of All Elite Wrestling pay-per-view events
- List of major Lucha Libre AAA Worldwide events
- List of ECW supercards and pay-per-view events
- List of FMW supercards and pay-per-view events
- List of Global Force Wrestling events and specials
- List of Impact Wrestling pay-per-view events
- List of Major League Wrestling events
- List of National Wrestling Alliance pay-per-view events
- List of NJPW pay-per-view events
- List of Ring of Honor pay-per-view events
- List of Smokey Mountain Wrestling supercard events
- List of World Class Championship Wrestling Supercard events
- List of WWA pay-per-view events
- List of WWE pay-per-view and livestreaming supercards
