= Referee (professional wrestling) =

Authority figure in professional wrestling

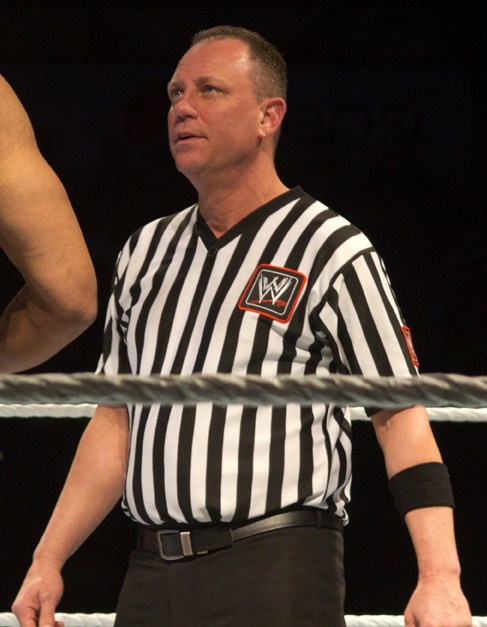
- Mike Chioda in 2012

Occupation
- Activity sectors: Professional wrestling matches

In professional wrestling, a referee is an authority figure present in or near the ring during matches. The referee's purpose is similar to that of referees in combat sports such as boxing or mixed martial arts, that is, as an arbiter of the rules and the person charged with rendering decisions. In reality, the referee is, like the wrestlers, a participant in executing a match in accordance with its script including its predetermined outcome, and is responsible for controlling the flow of the match and for relaying information or instructions from backstage officials to the wrestlers. Like wrestlers, referees are also responsible for maintaining kayfabe, and must render decisions in accordance with the promotion's kayfabe rules.

== Purpose ==
The kayfabe purpose of a professional wrestling referee is to render decisions (pinfalls, submissions, disqualifications, countouts) during a match but the legit purpose they serve is to transmit messages to wrestlers about the progress of matches, communicate with them about the amount of time left (plus the beginning and end of commercial breaks on live broadcasts) and, if necessary, help them gauge the crowd reaction as well as reminding them of match script. They also have a key role in ensuring that the wrestlers are physically capable to continue, and to stop the match/inform the opponent if there is a risk of injury present. According to referee Jim Korderas, the purpose of a referee is to help the talent to tell the story, while being invisible.

Presently, referees wear wireless earpieces, to allow backstage officials to communicate with them during matches. Referees are also selected by their employers subject to their height and weight, and normally referees would be no more than six feet (183 cm) tall, weigh no more than 180 lb (81.5 kg) and may generally display a non-athletic physique; examples of this are WWE referees Mike Chioda and Charles Robinson. Wrestlers who either began as referees, or retired from the ring and continued as referees, often were under six feet. The purpose of this size discrepancy is purely to emphasize the height, weight and musculature of some of the larger wrestlers and to compensate for smaller stars.

In recent years, to prevent the spread of blood-borne diseases such as hepatitis, WWE referees began keeping a pair of latex medical gloves in their pockets. This policy remains today. The gloves are put on whenever a wrestler is bleeding.

== The "X" sign ==
Although professional wrestling is worked, real injuries can be sustained. In such an event, the referee raises their hands above their head into an "X" shape to alert backstage officials and paramedics, as well as any other wrestlers that what is going on is really happening. An "X" sign across the chest is a warning, it signifies that a wrestler may be injured, but is still able to compete. In recent times, Total Nonstop Action Wrestling (TNA) and WWE have used the "X" sign to signify storyline as well as legitimate injuries. An example of this is when A.J. Styles was kayfabe injured after being hit with a powerbomb off the stage through a table by Bully Ray. Another example is during the 2006 Money in the Bank ladder match at WrestleMania 22 when Matt Hardy performed a suplex on Ric Flair from the top of the ladder, and the two referees, Jim Korderas and Mike Chioda, used the "X" sign. Flair re-entered the match minutes afterwards, showing that he was not legitimately injured.

An unusual usage of the sign came at TNA Victory Road (2011) when Jeff Hardy was heavily intoxicated but had managed to evade management prior to his entrance. Referee Brian Hebner realised that Hardy was not in condition to wrestle and threw up the sign prior to the match starting, causing an on-screen intervention from Eric Bischoff that lead Sting to immediately and legitimately pin Hardy in a shoot.

After the X sign is given, the officials backstage would communicate to the referee, if necessary, revised plans to end the match quickly. There is also a "blow off" sign, raising both arms straight up, if a wrestler seemed injured but feels he can continue.

Following AEW's All Out where a match was stopped in the middle for medical checkup, referees now have two-way radio communication so they can observe incidents during matches that may require medical attention by communicating with medical officials if necessary on the spot. Instead of the "X" sign, referees are now able to stop matches on the spot with radio communication. Referee Paul Turner used the radio to call medical officials immediately on an October 18, 2022 episode of Dynamite after "Hangman" Adam Page was legitimately injured. The match was stopped immediately and Jon Moxley was declared winner via referee stoppage.

== Distractions and bumps ==
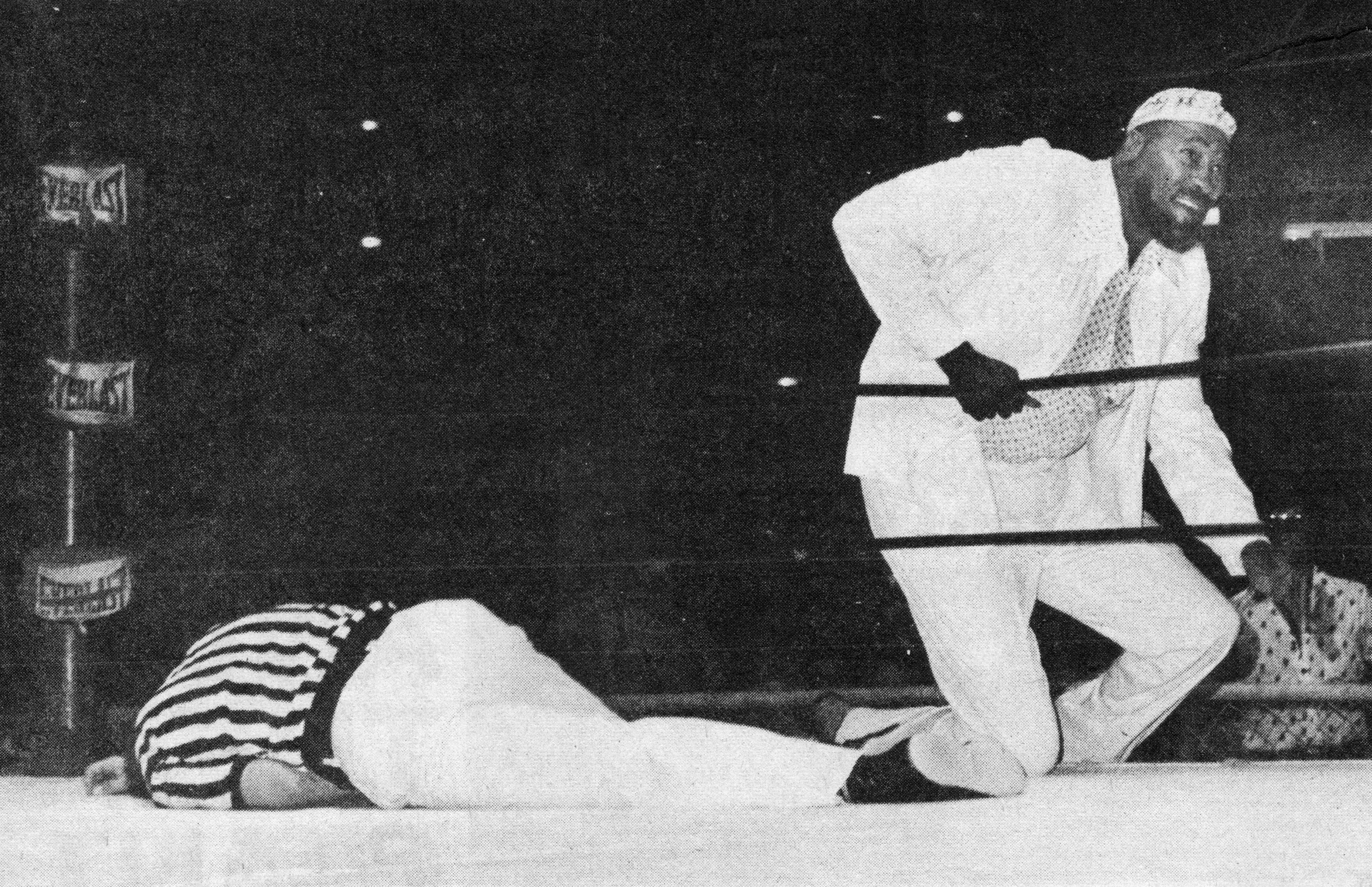
In a 1975 match for the NWA World Heavyweight Championship between champion Jack Brisco and challenger Mongolian Stomper, Stomper's manager, Bearcat Wright, enters the ring to interfere following a referee bump.

Most professional wrestling promotions have a kayfabe rule that referees do not make decisions based on anything they do not personally witness. Because of this, distracting or incapacitating the referee is often an element of a match, especially in standard matches where a wrestler is liable to lose a match by disqualification for performing an illegal move. Distraction or incapacitation of the referee is usually a precursor to the villain wrestler either performing a normally illegal move without any consequence, or outside interference in the match (a run in). Less commonly, the heroic wrestler might appear to win the match by pinfall or submission if not for the referee being distracted or incapacitated. These pre-planned temporary injuries to the referee are known as "bumps".

Distracting the referee is usually a deliberate tactic done by the villain, his manager, valet or his partner in a tag-team. It can also take the form of the referee taking an inordinate amount of time to talk to the heroic wrestler for violating the rules. Incapacitating the referee is usually done by a purportedly accidental collision with a wrestler, or a wrestler missing an attack on an opponent and hitting the referee instead, though sometimes a referee may be incapacitated by a deliberate attack by the villain or his manager. These distractions and bumps are usually designed to generate heat and response from the crowd. An example being a referee who is distracted by a heel that prevents the referee from seeing the face wrestler tagging in his partner, then once the heel leaves, the referee pointedly blocks the newly tagged in face wrestler from entering due to the "missed" tag. Often while the referee is now distracted by enforcing the rule requiring the official to see a tag to allow it, the heel team switch themselves in order to double team the stricken face wrestler left on his own.

When any of these happen, the referee usually appears to be knocked unconscious for a period of time by a move that is not considered particularly devastating when applied to a wrestler. This has garnered criticism over the years, as many referee bumps are supposed to depict the wrestlers as exceptionally powerful, but in many situations, referee bumps simply make the referees appear unrealistically weak and fragile. Perhaps the most infamous example of this happened at the otherwise universally-acclaimed pay-per-view event Wrestlemania X-Seven, during a match between Triple H and The Undertaker, when the Undertaker knocked out referee Mike Chioda with a single stomp and a single elbow to the back. Despite the relative lack of brutality, Chioda was kayfabe unconscious for ten solid minutes.

== Special referees ==
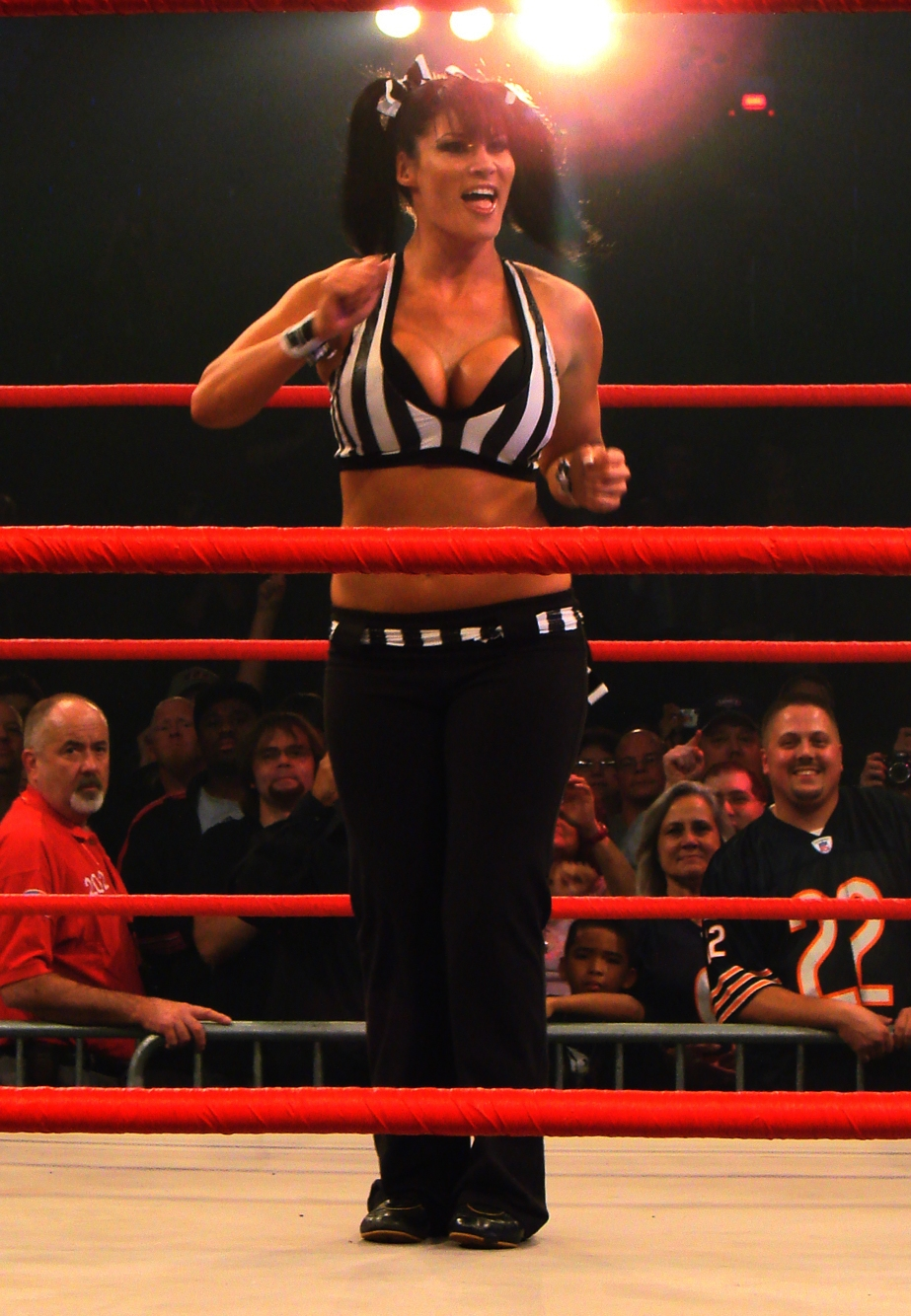
TNA performer Traci Brooks, who occasionally refereed matches in the company's Knockout Division

A special guest referee is a stipulation for any match in which the usual referee is replaced with a "guest" filling in as the official. Celebrities (such as Muhammad Ali in the main event of WrestleMania I), managers and other wrestlers can "guest" as the special referee. In some cases, a special referee is put into a match which is already a different match type or stipulation (for example: Hell in a Cell with a special referee, usually Shawn Michaels). The special referee would often be biased towards or against one of the competitors or could be assigned as the special referee to ensure the match is called down the line. In the WWF in September 1999, after all the referees got sick of continuously being attacked by wrestlers, they kayfabe went on strike, leading to other WWF workers (most notably Harvey Whippleman and Tom Prichard, along with a non-striking Jim Korderas) becoming "scab" referees until the night after Unforgiven, where Vince McMahon gave the regular referees more authority in matches (along with fining Triple H for striking on that same night).

Though rare, it is not unheard of for normal referees to engage in storylines where they become biased against or in favor of particular wrestlers in a manner usually reserved for special referees, Danny Davis being an example. Also, one of the more famous examples of this is the case of Earl Hebner in 2000, who became biased against then-dominant heel Triple H because Triple H would constantly abuse him during their matches. This culminated on the April 26, 2000, edition of Raw is War, where Hebner counted as fast as he could while Chris Jericho was pinning Triple H with the WWF Championship on the line. A more recent example is Scott Armstrong, a referee who was in cahoots with The Authority during the years of 2013 through 2016, often making fast counts when it was advantageous to members of the Authority and often coming out during ref bumps during matches where Authority members were competing.

=== Special outside referee ===
Also known as special enforcer or special guest enforcer is same as the special referee, but the guest referee stays on the outside of the ring enforcing what the normal referee does not see. These guests are sometimes known as "enforcers", the most famous of which was Mike Tyson, who served as the special guest enforcer for the WWF Championship match between Stone Cold Steve Austin and Shawn Michaels at WrestleMania XIV, and Chuck Norris who served as special guest enforcer at the 1994 Survivor Series in a match between The Undertaker and Yokozuna.

Special enforcers can become regular referees if the original inside referee becomes (kayfabe) permanently incapacitated. Otherwise though, the enforcer generally has no decision-making power, and is really put in the match to physically force wrestlers to obey the rules or physically remove interfering wrestlers from ringside.

== Personal referees ==
An effective gimmick for the villain wrestlers is to have a personal referee, who is on the permanent payroll of the villain. The referee can be simply a lackey, or a loyal ally with a senior position. This is a broader extension of the "corrupt referee" gimmick, in that the referee's allegiance is openly made public, and is blatantly flaunted to incense the audience – the referee himself is exempt from punishment due to his official position.

Examples include when the New World Order recruited WCW's senior referee Nick Patrick, and he became the sole official of nWo matches. He officiated every single match of the nWo Souled Out event in 1997. Ric Flair and The Four Horsemen had their own personal referee in WCW, Charles Robinson, who eventually adopted the look and mannerisms of Flair, and earned the nickname "Little Naitch", from Flair's nickname "Nature Boy". For a time in WCW, referees would not work Scott Steiner's matches, so he employed Mark "Slick" Johnson as his personal referee. Johnson had black and white paint on top of his head, wore an nWo logo on his shirt and had a whistle around his neck, just like ECW's Bill Alfonso. Another example of this is when Kurt Angle had Daivari as his personal referee during late 2005, with Daivari starting as the referee of Angle's match against John Cena for the WWE Championship at the 2005 Survivor Series. After Eric Bischoff was fired weeks after this, Daivari was relegated to being Angle's manager.

== Attire ==
A comparison of both Raw and SmackDown brand referee attires from past years, though there is no longer much difference between the attire of Raw and SmackDown referees

WWE referees have had a series of different uniforms throughout the years. From the 1970s until 1983, still operating under the World Wide Wrestling Federation banner, referees wore black and white striped shirts, comparable to referees in other sports, such as ice hockey, basketball, and American football. In the mid-1980s until 1995, a World Wrestling Federation (WWF) referee's attire consisted of a blue collared shirt with black trousers, boots, and bow tie, similar to that of a boxing official. Beginning with the March 13, 1995 episode of Monday Night Raw, the uniform was changed back to the black and white striped shirt with a WWF logo patch on the left breast as well as the shoulders. With the WWE brand extension in 2002, referees appearing on SmackDown! began wearing blue polo shirts with black pinstripes, differentiating themselves from the Raw referees, who continued to wear black and white shirts. When ECW was revived in 2006, their referees were given black shirts. As of 2007, they had grey and black polo shirts. As of November 2008, however, all referees wore black and white striped shirts and were no longer brand exclusive. On the November 15, 2010 episode of Raw, the referees wore the "boxing referee" attire as part of the Old School Raw special episode. Since the re-establishment of the brand extension in 2016, WWE referees have given colored designations on the patches with the logo; for instance, blue for SmackDown and red for Raw. However, NXT, WWE's developmental brand, has the NXT logo patches (formerly yellow until 2021) in place of the WWE logo patches. After Raw moved to Netflix in January 2025, all WWE referees in three assigned brands consolidated their look wearing a gray polo shirt with two black stripes on the left side similar to its UFC counterparts as both promotions are owned by TKO Group Holdings.

In WCW, referees wore collared shirts with bow ties until around 1999, when they switched to striped shirts. During The Invasion storyline in WWE (known at the time as WWF), the WCW referees wore white polo shirts, switching near the end of the storyline to baseball-jersey style grey shirts with a small black WCW logo on the left breast and one on the right sleeve. In ECW, referees first wore striped shirts (as they split off from the NWA), and later wore an all-black uniform akin to those of mixed martial arts officials, later with a half-black, half-red shirt. The all black uniform would return for the first two WWE One Night Stand events, before giving way to the brand extension ECW referee shirts.

In Total Nonstop Action Wrestling, referees wear blue football kit style jerseys from LaMelo Ball's "LaFrancé" brand.

In All Elite Wrestling, referees wear black and white striped shirts with the AEW logo, except for pay-per-view events, where the referee's shirt contains a patch with the event logo, on the right breast. AEW referee Aubrey Edwards noted on social media the promotion has a deal with Canton, Ohio manufacturer Smitty Officials Apparel, which supplies a gridiron football-specific two-inch wide stripe shirt for officials.

Special referees wear themed versions of these; for example, if a regular female wrestler or celebrity is cast, she would typically wear a skimpier version of a normal referee's shirt. This practice was phased out the WWE throughout the 2010s, as a reflection on the general trend of treating female wrestlers less as models and more like genuine athletes; WWE, AEW, and Impact all now regularly feature female referees on their programming wearing the same uniform as their male counterparts. Others may just add a referee-style shirt to their normal costume such as the case of Mick Foley, who wore a rumpled white dress shirt with black stripes painted on while arbitrating matches. In these cases, the emphasis is on the character temporarily assuming the referee's role.

== Notable referees ==
- Matt Ball (UK referee and former wrestler)
- Bill Alfonso
- Randy Anderson (1959–2002)
- Scott Armstrong
- Jason Ayers
- Jessika Carr (first full-time female WWE referee)
- Rita Chatterton (first female referee in the WWF)
- Mike Chioda
- John Cone
- Dangerous Danny Davis
- Jack Doan
- Aubrey Edwards (first full-time female AEW referee)
- Dan Engler
- Tiger Hattori
- Dave Hebner (1949–2022)
- Earl Hebner
- Joe Higuchi (1929–2010)
- Brian Hildebrand (1962–1999)
- Jimmy Korderas
- Mills Lane (1937–2022)
- Theodore Long
- Joey Marella (1963–1994)
- Shane McMahon (using the name Shane Stevens)
- Nick Patrick
- Charles Robinson
- Billy Silverman
- Kyohei Wada
- Tim White (1954–2022)
- Drake Wuertz
- Tommy Young
