= Nick Patrick (referee) =

American professional wrestling referee

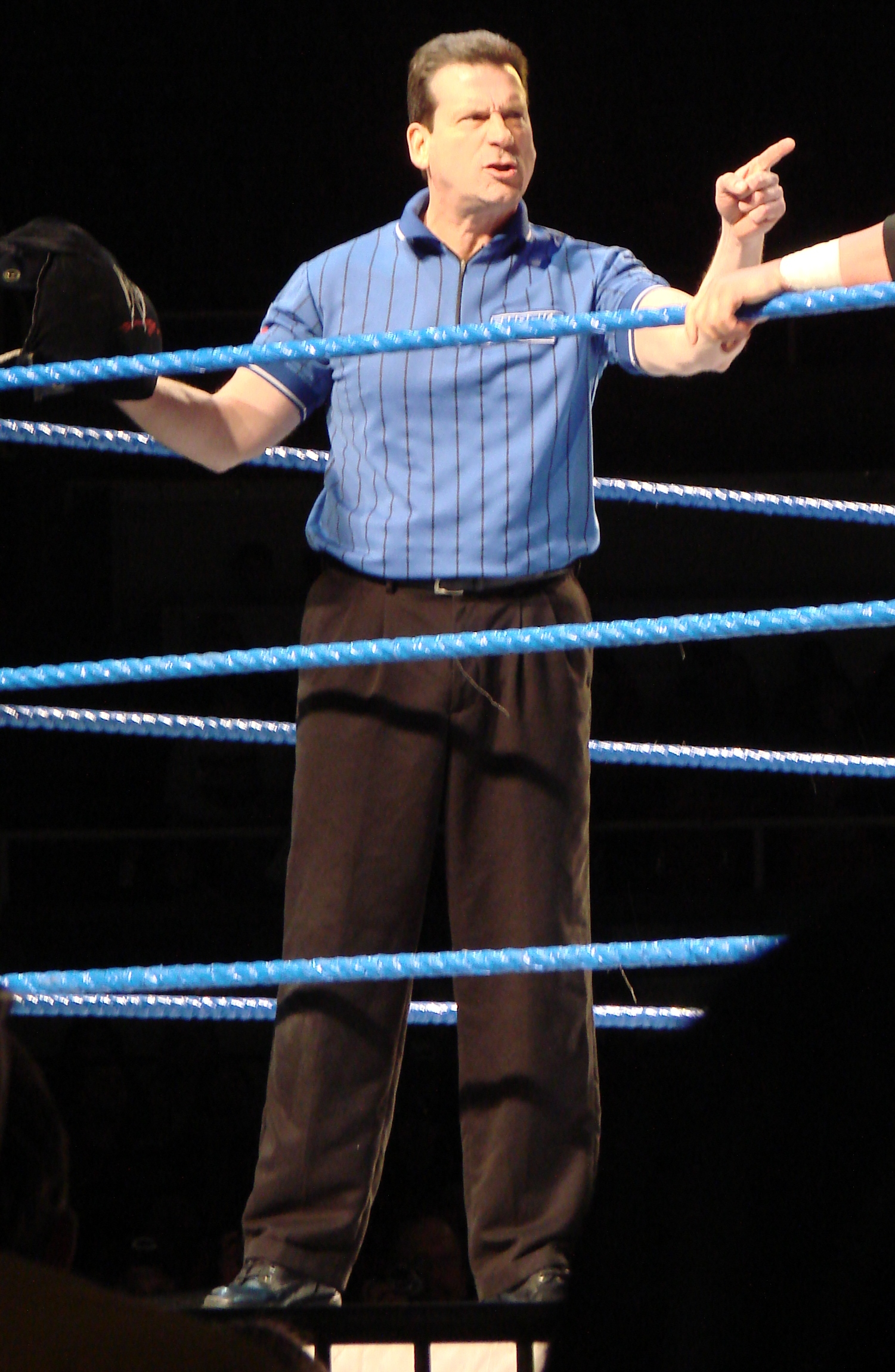
- Patrick in 2007

Personal information
- Born: Joseph Nicholas Patrick Hamilton Jr. November 9, 1960 (age 66) St. Joseph, Missouri, U.S.
- Family: Jody Hamilton (father)

Professional wrestling career
- Ring name: Nick Patrick
- Billed height: 6 ft 2 in (1.88 m)
- Billed weight: 220 lb (100 kg)
- Debut: 1984
- Retired: 1985 (as a wrestler); 2010 (as a referee)

Joseph Nicholas Patrick Hamilton Jr. (born November 9, 1959), better known by his ring name Nick Patrick, is a retired American professional wrestling referee. He is a former referee for World Championship Wrestling (WCW) and World Wrestling Entertainment (WWE). He has also served as head referee for former WWE developmental territory Deep South Wrestling (DSW) until that company's closing, and is former head referee for Florida Championship Wrestling (FCW).

== Early life ==
Hamilton is the son of wrestling legend Jody Hamilton, who wrestled as The Assassin.

== Career ==
=== Georgia Championship Wrestling (1980–1984) ===
He was a referee in the National Wrestling Alliance (NWA)'s Georgia Championship Wrestling starting in 1980 under the name Nick Patrick, as he wanted to make a name for himself without his father's help.

=== Brief wrestling career (1984–1985) ===
In June 1984, Patrick transitioned into a wrestler, teaming with his father. In CWG, Patrick was in a feud with Bob Roop, which resulted in a series of Lights Out matches, where they traded victories. In 1985, he moved to the Gulf Coast for Continental Championship Wrestling, frequently teaming with Steve Armstrong, feuding with The Nightmares. By October 1985, he moved on to Mid-South Wrestling, where he was used as an enhancement talent. By the end of 1985, Patrick suffered a knee injury that ended his wrestling career.

=== Deep South Wrestling and World Championship Wrestling (1986–2001) ===
After his wrestling career was cut short due to a knee injury, Patrick would help his father out in his promotion, Deep South Wrestling, as an announcer/color commentator. In 1988, when Turner Broadcasting bought JCP and renamed it World Championship Wrestling (WCW), Patrick was brought in as a referee. After Tommy Young retired in November 1989, Patrick became WCW's senior referee.

==== NWO (1996-1997) ====
Shortly after the New World Order (nWo), Patrick slowly began having a change in attitude, at WCW Hog Wild, he was the referee for the match between Sting and Lex Luger again The Outsiders and during the match, Patrick clipped Luger in the leg and Kevin Nash pinned Luger and giving a fast count and a win for The Outsiders. Afterwards, Sting and Luger began blaming Patrick for the loss. Patrick began favoring more heels to win their matches including the nWo stable. On WCW Saturday Night, they began showing a portion called "nWo Saturday Night" with Patrick playing a masked referee and Patrick claimed it wasn't him. Patick then feuded with former referee turned manager Theodore Long who thinks Patrick was copying him what Long was doing during his referee days,he was forced into a match against Chris Jericho at the World War 3 pay-per-view on November 24, 1996, in Norfolk, Virginia. Jericho had one arm tied behind his back and still defeated Patrick. Afterwards Patrick officially joined the nWo.

Patrick's biggest night with the nWo was refereeing every single match on the nWo Souled Out pay-per-view on January 25, 1997, in Cedar Rapids, Iowa. However, during the Steiner Brothers VS. Outsiders match, Patrick was knocked out and Randy Anderson refereed the rest of the match and awarded the match to The Steiners who won the WCW World Tag Team Championship. However, Eric Bischoff reversed the decision and the titles returned to the Outsiders and because of this, Randy Anderson (who in storyline was fired for refereeing the rest of the match) was forced to wrestle Patrick on WCW Monday Nitro in which Anderson won but was disqualified by Bischoff for using the brass knuckles on Patrick.

His nWo tenure came to an end at Spring Stampede 1997. Scott Hall and Kevin Nash were scheduled to defend the WCW World Tag Team Championship against The Steiner Brothers. Due to out-of-ring attacks and such, combined with Hall failing to show for the event, the title match eventually became a singles match between Nash and Rick Steiner. Nash was allowed to appoint a referee and he chose Patrick. During the match, Nash removed the padding over the turnbuckle and dropped Steiner's face on it. However, in a turn of events, Patrick was starting to become visibly uncomfortable with how Nash was treating Steiner and would soon have a change of heart. Fellow nWo associate Ted DiBiase also had a change of heart and attempted, with Patrick, to get Nash to stop. When Nash refused, DiBiase left to get help for Steiner. Nash covered an unconscious Steiner and Patrick didn't want to make the 3-count until Nash forced him to, awarding the contest to Nash. Patrick then told Nash to stop as he would also leave to get help for Steiner. After the match, Nash kept performing the maneuver on Steiner. Later that evening, Patrick served as referee for the main event match between nWo member Randy Savage and Diamond Dallas Page, counting a proper pin for Page. After the match, Nash came out and attacked Patrick, for all intents and purposes, kicking him out of the nWo.

On the April 21, 1997 edition of Nitro, he unexpectedly appeared at the broadcast desk with Tony Schiavone and Larry Zbyszko. Wearing a green WCW polo shirt, he cut a promo explaining that he was sick of Eric Bischoff and the way the nWo did business. He explained that he never wanted to fight fellow referee Randy Anderson (probably due to the real fact that Anderson was battling cancer which took his life in 2002) and asked for his job back. Both Schiavone and Zbyszko were skeptical, especially Zbyszko, who was intensely critical. They went to a commercial break with Patrick and Zbyszko arguing. The next week on Nitro, WCW executive J. J. Dillon re-hired Patrick on a probationary basis. Although Patrick never sided with the nWo again, he remained a heel referee.

Patrick created massive controversy during the WCW World Heavyweight Championship match between Sting and Hollywood Hogan at Starrcade 1997; he was supposed to make a "fast count" but botched it by counting at normal speed. Bret Hart stopped Patrick from giving Hogan the title, claiming the fast-count, and restarted the match claiming that he didn't want to see Sting get screwed like he was. After a rematch, the title was declared vacant. Patrick would referee another rematch for the vacant belt, taking over for Charles Robinson (who had been knocked out during the match). Sting would win that match.

=== World Wrestling Federation/Entertainment (2001–2008) ===
When WCW was bought by the WWF, he was one of three WCW referees who had their contracts purchased, along with Charles Robinson and Billy Silverman. He became a referee for The Alliance of WCW and Extreme Championship Wrestling (ECW) wrestlers trying to take over the WWF. He even had a match against Earl Hebner at the WWF Invasion pay-per-view on July 22, 2001, in Cleveland, Ohio. Patrick lost to Hebner and Mick Foley, the special guest referee, gave him "Mr. Socko" after the match.

During the time of the Alliance, Patrick continued to play a heel referee, siding with the Alliance wrestlers over the WWF wrestlers. For example, during a WCW Championship handicap match between The Rock and Booker T and Shane McMahon at Unforgiven, Patrick refused to count when The Rock had Booker T or Shane pinned down. At Survivor Series, Patrick knocked out Hebner to take over as referee during the "Winner Take All" elimination tag match. After he gave a normal "slow count" for The Rock, Stone Cold Steve Austin became enraged, knocked Patrick out, and brought Hebner back in as referee. After the Alliance angle ended, Patrick became an official WWF referee. At first he was a heel referee, refusing to count to three for face wrestlers as Austin and The Rock, and favoring heel wrestlers like Chris Jericho and Kurt Angle. After WrestleMania X8, Patrick started portraying a neutral referee once again.

After the brand split, Patrick became head referee on the SmackDown! brand. He officiated the World Heavyweight Championship match at ECW One Night Stand 2006 between champion Rey Mysterio and Sabu.

Patrick left the SmackDown! brand on February 9, 2007, and Mickie Henson took over as senior referee. Patrick remained with WWE, officiating matches in their new developmental territory, Florida Championship Wrestling (FCW).

Patrick returned to the SmackDown brand on February 8, 2008, and refereed a tag team match between Jesse and Festus and Deuce 'n Domino. However, he quickly disappeared again due to his injuries.

Patrick was released from the WWE on August 8, 2008, after seven months of inactivity due to a chronic back injury.

=== Retirement (2009–2010) ===
On February 15, 2009, Patrick officially returned to wrestling when he was introduced as the on-camera commissioner of Rampage Pro Wrestling, an independent promotion based out of Warner Robins, Georgia. Patrick portrayed a neutral commissioner. Patrick refereed his first match since his WWE release at RPW's "Showdown" supercard at the Macon City Auditorium on April 10, 2009, officiating a no-holds-barred, hair vs. hair contest between Cru Jones and Doc Gayton.

In April 2009, Patrick became RPW's television show director, replacing his father, Jody Hamilton, after the promotion released Hamilton due to financial cutbacks. The promotion re-hired Hamilton later in the year in October. In September 2009, Patrick became the promotion's legitimate general manager. When Patrick took over, he and Hamilton became the primary forces behind the booking. In June 2010, the promotion was temporarily closed down due to internal disputes he and his father were having with others in RPW. The company decided to move forward, but not before firing everyone involved in the disputes, including Patrick and Hamilton. A few days later, Patrick signed on to become the general manager of Great Championship Wrestling, an independent promotion based out of Phenix City, Alabama. However, Patrick resigned from GCW after only two weeks.

=== Promoting (2021–present) ===
In February 2021, Patrick revived his father's old promotion, Deep South Wrestling.

=== Video games ===
Patrick is featured in the WWE video game series with appearances in WWE Smackdown vs. Raw 2007, WWE Smackdown vs. Raw 2008, and WWE Smackdown vs. Raw 2009.

He was also the base of the referee model of WWE SmackDown! Here Comes the Pain.

== Job titles ==
- Senior Developmental Referee and Referee Trainer
- National Wrestling Alliance (NWA) Referee
- Former World Championship Wrestling (WCW) Referee
- Former World Wrestling Entertainment (WWE) Referee
- Former Deep South Wrestling (DSW) Referee
- Former Florida Championship Wrestling (FCW) Referee
- Rampage Pro Wrestling TV Director/General Manager/On-Camera Commissioner/Occasional Special Referee
- Great Championship Wrestling General Manager
- Deep South Wrestling Owner/Promoter

== Awards ==
- Wrestling Observer Newsletter
  - Best Gimmick (1996) – nWo
  - Feud of the Year (1996) New World Order vs. World Championship Wrestling

Sporting positions
Preceded by Mike Chioda	WWE SmackDown Senior Referee; 2003–2007	Succeeded by Mickie Henson
Preceded by First	WCW Senior Referee	Succeeded by none
