= Randy Anderson =

American professional wrestling referee and amateur wrestler

Personal information
- Born: Randall Anderson; July 17, 1959 Rome, Georgia, U.S.
- Died: May 5, 2002 (aged 42) Rome, Georgia, U.S.
- Cause of death: Testicular cancer
- Spouse: Kristy Anderson
- Children: 2

Professional wrestling career
- Ring name(s): Pee Wee Anderson; Randy Anderson
- Billed height: 5 ft 7 in (170 cm)
- Debut: 1978
- Retired: 1999

Randall "Pee Wee" Anderson (July 17, 1959 – May 5, 2002) was an American professional wrestling referee and amateur wrestler who worked for the National Wrestling Alliance (NWA)'s Jim Crockett Promotions and World Championship Wrestling.

== Professional wrestling career ==
Anderson was a childhood friend of Arn Anderson. He started out training for a professional wrestling career with Arn under the tutelage of Ted Allen. Anderson started working as a referee upon his graduation in 1978 in Mid-South Wrestling. He also refereed in Championship Wrestling from Florida.

In 1985, Anderson joined the National Wrestling Alliance (NWA)'s Jim Crockett Promotions in 1985. He quickly rose up the referee ranks and was the referee for several main event matches. In 1988, when Ted Turner bought Crockett and renamed it World Championship Wrestling, Anderson stayed on.

Anderson was the referee in charge of the main event six-man tag match at Bash at the Beach 1996 which saw the heel turn of Hulk Hogan and the formation of the New World Order (nWo). From 1996 to 1997, Anderson played a role in the "hostile takeover" of WCW by the nWo. He refused to work on the September 23, 1996, episode of Monday Nitro after nWo members took control of the broadcast. Eric Bischoff and the nWo bullied him around. At Souled Out, nWo referee Nick Patrick was bumped and knocked out. Anderson came from the crowd to count the pinfall and award the tag team championship to the Steiner Brothers. Bischoff fired Anderson for interfering, but then decided to allow Anderson to wrestle Patrick to get his job back. Anderson defeated him by using a foreign object, from fellow WCW referee Jimmy Jett. Immediately following this match, Eric Bischoff reversed the decision and fired both Jett and Anderson. According to story line, Anderson was reinstated and officiated his first match after being fired on the March 10, 1997, episode of Nitro. Anderson continued as a referee in WCW until September 1999.

== Personal life ==
Anderson was an amateur wrestler in high school, winning a state championship in the 119-lb class.

== Death ==
In 1996, Anderson was diagnosed with testicular cancer at the age of 36. He was diagnosed after recognizing his symptoms while reading a medical magazine. Because of a malignant tumor, he had to have his left testicle removed. In November 1996, he beat the cancer, however in September 1999, the cancer returned and Anderson retired from refereeing. Anderson died on May 5, 2002, as a result of the testicular cancer. He was 42 years old. Anderson was survived by his wife Kristy, daughter Montana, and son Chase.

== See also ==
- List of premature professional wrestling deaths
