= Billy Silverman =

American professional wrestling referee

Personal information
- Born: William Daley; February 21, 1962 (age 64) Auburn, Maine, U.S.

Professional wrestling career
- Debut: 1985

William Daley (born February 21, 1962) better known by his ring name Billy Silverman, is an American professional wrestling referee who worked for World Championship Wrestling and the World Wrestling Federation and later World Wrestling Entertainment.

== Professional wrestling career ==
Silverman started with the WWF in 1986 and worked there until 1997. Soon after his departure from the WWF, he signed with World Championship Wrestling. He stayed with WCW until the company was purchased by Vince McMahon and the WWE in March 2001. He returned to World Wrestling Entertainment and became a member of The Alliance.

Silverman appeared in the 2000 movie Ready to Rumble and the 2003 movie Mystic River. And most recently in the 2021 Hollywood International Golden Age Festival Award Winner The Lollipop Gang

== Awards and honors ==
- Cauliflower Alley Club
  - Charlie Smith Referee's Award (2022)
- New England Pro Wrestling Hall of Fame
  - Class of 2014
