= TCW Tag Team Championship =

Professional wrestling tag team championship

Details
- Promotion: Turnbuckle Championship Wrestling
- Date established: March 3, 2001
- Date retired: July 27, 2002
Statistics
- First champions: Scott Anton and Erik Watts
- Final champions: Jorge Estrada and Sonny Siaki

The TCW Tag Team Championship was the primary professional wrestling tag team title of Turnbuckle Championship Wrestling. It was originally won by Scott Anton and Erik Watts who defeated Glacier and Jorge Estrada, coincidentally opponents for the TCW Heavyweight Championship, in Dothan, Alabama, on March 3, 2001. Unlike the singles titles, the tag team titles changed hands very often when the promotion toured outside the state of Georgia, as far away as Alabama and Tennessee.

== Title history ==
Wrestlers:	Times:	Date:	Location:	Notes:
Scott Anton and Erik Watts	1	March 3, 2001	Dothan, Alabama	Defeat Glacier and Jorge Estrada to become the first champions.
Glacier and Jorge Estrada	1	April 21, 2001	Cleveland, Tennessee	
The Public Enemy; Rocco Rock and Johnny Grunge)	1	July 7, 2001	Dothan, Alabama	Public Enemy also held the MECW Tag Team Championship at the time of the match.
Title is vacated in August 2001 when The Public Enemy leave the promotion to return to Main Event Championship Wrestling.
Southside Trash (Randy Harris and David Parrish)	1	September 15, 2001	Carrollton, Georgia	Defeated Jorge Estrada and Sonny Siaki to win the vacant titles.
Glacier (2) and "Big" Ron Studd	1	March 1, 2002	Carrollton, Georgia	
Title is vacated in 2002.
Jorge Estrada (2) and Sonny Siaki	1	July 27, 2002	Carrollton, Georgia	Defeated the Dobbins Brothers (Chad and Jason Dobbins) at the VFW Fairgrounds to win vacant title.
