= Turnbuckle Championship Wrestling =

American professional wrestling promotion

- Acronym: TCW
- Founded: 2000
- Style: Southern
- Headquarters: Marietta, Georgia, United States
- Founder: Dusty Rhodes
- Owner: Dusty Rhodes (2000–2003)
- Parent: TurnBuckle Entertainment, Inc.
- Website: DustyRhodes.net (Archived)

Turnbuckle Championship Wrestling was a Southeastern independent professional wrestling promotion based in Marietta, Georgia. It was founded by retired wrestler and former NWA World Heavyweight Champion Dusty Rhodes in 2000 and, during its three years in operation, held events throughout the Southern United States in Virginia, Tennessee, Florida, Georgia and Alabama; it was especially popular in Atlanta, Georgia and Dothan, Alabama where the promotion regularly held events. TCW also cooperated with rival independent promotions by holding interpromotional shows with Florida Championship Wrestling. The promotion, at its height, had a successful weekly television series in the Atlanta-Macon, Georgia area and had planned to air one live pay-per-view event before its closure in 2003.

TCW later became home to many high-profile wrestlers after the closure of World Championship Wrestling and later Extreme Championship Wrestling in 2001. Among the former WCW roster included Sean Evans, Disco Inferno, David Flair, Lodi, Daffney Glacier, Ron Reis, Sonny Siaki, Scotty Riggs, Larry Zbyszko, Scott Hall, and The Public Enemy (Rocco Rock & Johnny Grunge), all of whom would win championship titles. Dusty's son Dustin Rhodes, who at the time was also wrestling for World Wrestling Entertainment as Goldust, also had a central role in the promotion and briefly held the TCW Heavyweight Championship in early 2002.

From ECW, Yoshihiro Tajiri and Super Crazy continued their long-running feud. The "heel stable" The Extreme Horsemen was formed by ex-ECW stars Steve Corino, Barry Windham and C. W. Anderson. Windham's brother, Kendall, also made occasional appearances for the promotion.

Older stars such as father and son Bob and Scott Armstrong, Manny Fernandez, Bobby Eaton, Ricky Morton, female wrestlers Leilani Kai, Malia Hosaka and Kim Nielsen, and independent wrestlers Jorge Estrada, Jason Sugarman and Steve Lawler were part of the roster as well. Damian Steele, one-half of Ebony & Ivory with Ray Gordy in Deep South Wrestling, got his start in Turnbuckle Championship Wrestling. Erik Watts and Chad Fortune, who previously teamed together in the World Wrestling Federation as Tekno Team 2000, also competed in the promotion.

== History ==
Dusty Rhodes began plans for organizing a new promotion based in the state of Georgia in 1999, later establishing offices in East Cobb County, Georgia. It would be, said Rhodes, a southern promotion that was "old school but with modern ideas". Early the next year, he started promoting local wrestling events in Georgia, Alabama and Tennessee as part of "The American Dream Tour 2000". The first official event held by TCW took place in Ashburn, Georgia on July 6, 2000, and crowned its first heavyweight champion, Glacier, defeating Jorge Estrada in tournament final. Rhodes, who had previous experience as a booker and television producer for Jim Crockett Promotions and World Championship Wrestling, was able to get a television show aired in Atlanta and Macon, Georgia and soon began negotiating with the Sunshine Network hoping to build on the traditional wrestling fanbase in the Southern, Gulf Coast and Mid-Atlantic region.

In early 2001, the closings of World Championship Wrestling and Extreme Championship Wrestling resulted in the appearance of many of its former stars in TCW. Sean Evans, a trainer at the WCW Power Plant, joined the promotion early on and helped bring in several former WCW stars. One of these was former manager/valet Daffney whose ex-husband, Rich Ward, was a friend of Evans. She was one of four female wrestlers who competed for the promotion, the others being Kim Nielsen, Leilani Kai and Malia Hosaka.

A house show in Winchester, Tennessee on February 17, later released on VHS, featured former ECW stars Yoshihiro Tajiri and Super Crazy, WCW veterans Ron Reis, Glacier, Scott Anton and, in the main event, a tag team match between Dusty Rhodes and Barry Windham against Erik Watts and Steve Corino. Female wrestlers Leilani Kai and Malia Hosaka also participated in an exhibition match. The next night in Carrollton, Georgia featured a Rookies Battle Royal, showcasing the younger up-and-coming wrestlers in the promotion, and Dusty Rhodes with a mystery partner in a tag team match against Erik Watts and Steve Lawler. On March 3, Scott "The Clap" Anton and "The Extreme Dream" Erik Watts became the first TCW Tag Team Champions defeating Glacier and Jorge Estrada in Dothan, Alabama.

In April, Rhodes announced that the promotion would be airing its first PPV event that fall, originally on Thanksgiving night in Charlotte, North Carolina, and that TCW would also be airing on television. The series, Rhodes claimed, would feature regular TV appearances by some of the more recognizable wrestlers in professional wrestling, most notably, his son Dustin Rhodes. Scott Hall also joined the promotion and made his official in-ring debut at a special house show in Dothan on May 12.

On June 16 in Calhoun, Georgia, Larry Zbyszko made an appearance to take on Dusty Rhodes in the main event. Though starting off as a singles match, it was turned into a tag team match following outside interference by Luther Biggs and Bobby Hayes. The match was eventually won by Rhodes and Hayes. The promotion also continued to hold regular monthly shows at the Houston County Farm Center in Dothan, Alabama between July and December 2001.

The next month, Rhodes teamed with his son Dustin, then making his TCW debut less than three days after his WCW contract expired, at a Dothan house show on August 4. Together they faced C. W. Anderson and the masked wrestler American Nightmare in the main event. Dustin Rhodes was highly supportive of TCW as he explained in an August 2001 interview with Greg Oliver, "TCW is the alternative to the World Wrestling Federation. To me in my mind, my opinion, and my dad's opinion, we are the World Wrestling Federation's competition. We are not an independent, we are a company. We want to be treated as one. So we're going to do everything we can to make it a respectable, family entertainment business."

Having begun holding events in Florida that year, Turnbuckle Championship Wrestling began branching out to rival promotions. Among these was NWA Florida, a promotion Rhodes' himself competed earlier in his career, and two of their stars, Jason Sugarman and Jorge Estrada, appeared at the August 21st NWA Florida show at the Fort Homer W. Hesterly Armory in Tampa, Florida. Their match was to fill in for Cyborg and Horace Hogan, both men having been injured. Steve Corino, then NWA World Heavyweight Champion, defended the title in the main event against Buck Quartermaine. NWA Florida stars Buck Quartermain and The New Heavenly Bodies (Vito DeNucci and Chris Nelson) would appear at TCW house shows in late August. A secondary title, the TCW Hardcore Championship, was established when Lodi defeated "Raging Bull" Manny Fernandez in Carrollton, Georgia on September 15.

The promotion held its first television taping, TCW Halloween Horror Slam I, which was later released on VHS. It featured the tag team of Bobby Eaton and Ricky Morton, the two men having experienced a fierce rivalry during the 1980s as members of The Midnight Express and The Rock 'n' Roll Express respectively, in the semi-main event against Erik Watts and Chad Fortune. Watts and Fortune had previously teamed together in the World Wrestling Federation during the 1990s as Tekno Team 2000. In the main event, Glacier defended the TCW Heavyweight Championship against Barry Windham.

On December 28, 2001, TCW and NWA Florida held an interpromotional event at the Volusia County Fairgrounds in DeLand, Florida. In singles matches, Lex Lovett defeated Steve Madison, Jorge Estrada defeated Luther Biggs and Buck Quartermaine defeated Spanky Malone. In a match lasting over 30 minutes, TCW's Glacier and Jason Sugarman won the NWA World Tag Team Championship from The New Heavenly Bodies. In the semi-main event, TCW Heavyweight Champion Scotty Riggs kept his title via disqualification against Barry Windham. The sixth and final match was an "ECW vs. TCW" match in which Steve Corino and Jack Victory took on father and son Dusty and Dustin Rhodes.

On January 26, 2002, Dustin Rhodes defeated Scotty Riggs to win TCW Heavyweight Championship but surrendered the title the following day with the announcement that he would be returning to WWE as a full-time competitor. Dustin wrestled a few last matches before leaving TCW. The first, on February 2, was a 6-man tag team TLC match with his father Dusty and Ron Studd against Scotty Riggs, Jason Sugarman and an impostor Goldust. A second match took place days later in Carrollton and resulted in a victory over Steve Corino. His third and last match was against Scotty Riggs who defeated him for the TCW Heavyweight Championship in Carrollton on March 1. With this victory, Riggs became a record 3-time heavyweight champion.

In July 2003, Rhodes appeared alongside sports director Mike Raita on the Paul Finebaum Radio Network and discussed both his wrestling career and Turnbuckle Championship Wrestling. However, partially due to declining business as well as increased competition from WWE, Rhodes was forced to close the promotion shortly after The Dusty 35th Anniversary Tour that same year. The announcement followed after Rhodes signed a contract with Total Nonstop Action Wrestling.

In December 2023, Nightmare Factory LLC, under the leadership of WWE star Cody Rhodes, filed for the trademark of "Turnbuckle Championship Wrestling". This filing hints the revival of the original TCW brand, initially founded by Cody's father, Dusty Rhodes. The trademark application, covering various merchandise and entertainment services related to wrestling contests, is about preserving TCW legacy while adapting to the evolving landscape of entertainment.

== Alumni ==
Male wrestlers

Birth name:	Ring name(s):	Tenure:	Notes
Scott Antol	Scotty Riggs	2001–2002	
Larry Brannon	Vivacious Vito	2001	
Luther Biggs	Disgraceland	2001–2002	
Bradley Cain	Lodi	2001	
Edward Chastain	Iceberg	2002	
Jonathan Clark	Chase Stevens	2003	
Steve Corino	Steve Corino	2001–2002	
James Cox	James Storm	2003	
Damien Dothard	Damien Dynamite	2004	
James Duggan Jr.	Jim Duggan	2003	
Sean Evans	Sean Evans	2001–2002	
Stephen Favata	Steve Madison	2001	
Emanuel Fernandez	Manny Fernandez	2001	
David Fliehr	David Flair	2003	
Chad Fortune	Chad Fortune	2001	
Glenn Gilberti	Disco Inferno	2003	
Terry Ray Gordy Jr.	Ray Gordy	2003	
Michael Gossett	Mike Graham	2001	
Steve Gower	Steve Lawler / Liberty McCall	2001	
Scott Hall	Scott Hall	2001	
Joseph Melton James	Bob Armstrong	2001	
Joseph Scott James	Scott Armstrong	2001	
Christopher Klucsaritis	Chris Kanyon	2001	
Raymond Lloyd	Glacier / Ray Lloyd	2001–2003	
Dustin Fordham	Dustin Fordham	2001–2003	
Jorge Moraza	Jorge Estrada	2001–2003	
Ronald Reis	Big Ron Studd	2001–2002	
Francisco Islas Rueda	Super Crazy	2001	
Dustin Runnels	Dustin Rhodes	2001–2002	
Virgil Runnels Jr.	Dusty Rhodes	2001–2003	
Jason Seguine	Buck Q	2001	
Sonny Siaki	Sonny Siaki	2002–2003	
Jason Sugarman	Jason Sugarman	2001–2003	
Yoshihiro Tajiri	Yoshihiro Tajiri	2001	
Christopher Tipton	Casanova Chris	2001	
Chris Vaughn	Chris Vaughn	2003	
Erik Watts	Erik Watts	2001	
Lawrence Whistler	Larry Zbyszko	2001; 2003	
David Williams	David Young	2003	
Barry Windham	Barry Windham	2001–2002	
Kendall Windham	Kendall Windham	2002	
Chris Wright	C. W. Anderson	2001	
Jerome Young	New Jack	2001–2003	
Unknown	Bobby Hayes	2001; 2003	
TJ Gray	Fake Goldust	2001–2002	
Unknown	Henry Hoss	2002–2003	
Unknown	Lee Thomas	2003	
Unknown	Palm Beach Boy Jon / Jon Holcombe	2001–2002	
Unknown	Palm Beach Boy Scott / Scott Ross	2001–2002	
Unknown	The Reverend	2002–2003	
Unknown	Scotty Beach		
Unknown	Silky Boom Boom	2002	
Unknown	Simon Sermon	2002	
Unknown	Spanky Malone	2001	
Unknown	Terry Austin	2002	
Unknown	TJ Gray	2002	

Female wrestlers

Birth name:	Ring name(s):	Tenure:	Notes
Malia Hosaka	Malia Hosaka	2001	
Selina Majors	Bambi	2002–2003	
Kimberly Nielsen	Desire	2001; 2003	
Patty Seymour	Leilani Kai	2001	
Shannon Spruill	Daffney	2001–2002	

== Championships ==
=== TCW Heavyweight Championship ===
The TCW Heavyweight Championship was the primary professional wrestling singles title of Turnbuckle Championship Wrestling. It was originally won by Glacier who defeated Jorge Estrada in tournament final held in Ashburn, Georgia on July 6, 2000. It was defended primarily in the state of Georgia but throughout the Southern United States, most often in Dothan, Alabama, until the promotion's close in 2003.

Wrestlers:	Times:	Date:	Location:	Notes:
Glacier	1	July 6, 2000	Ashburn, Georgia	Defeated Jorge Estrada in tournament final to become the first champion.
Barry Windham	1	October 28, 2000	Warner Robins, Georgia	
Scotty Anton	1	June 2, 2001	Dothan, Alabama	the match ended with Daffney counting the pinfall and Anton left with the title.
Barry Windham	2	June 7, 2001	Milledgeville, Georgia	Title is returned to Windham due to the controversial finish.
Scotty Anton	2	September 15, 2001	Carrollton, Georgia	
Dustin Rhodes	1	January 26, 2002	Carrollton, Georgia	
Scotty Anton	3	March 1, 2002	Carrollton, Georgia	
Title is vacated when Scotty Riggs forfeits the championship after suffering an elbow injury.
Glacier	2	September 14, 2002	Carrollton, Georgia	Defeated Damien to win the vacant title.

=== TCW Hardcore Championship ===
The TCW Hardcore Championship was the secondary professional wrestling singles title of Turnbuckle Championship Wrestling. It was first won by Lodi after defeating "Raging Bull" Manny Fernandez in Carrollton, Georgia on September 18, 2001. The Hardcore title, like the Heavyweight title, was mostly defended in Georgia but also in other parts of the Southern United States such as Dothan, Alabama.

Wrestlers:	Times:	Date:	Location:	Notes:
Jason Sugarman	1	September 15, 2001	Carrollton, Georgia	
Lodi	1	September 29, 2001	Dothan, Alabama	Defeated Manny Fernandez to become the first recognized champion.

=== TCW Tag Team Championship ===
The TCW Tag Team Championship was the primary professional wrestling tag team title of Turnbuckle Championship Wrestling. It was originally won by Scott Anton & Erik Watts who defeated Glacier & Jorge Estrada, coincidentally opponents for the TCW Heavyweight Championship, in Dothan, Alabama on March 3, 2001. Unlike the singles titles, the tag team titles changed hands very often when the promotion toured outside the state of Georgia, as far away as Alabama and Tennessee.

Wrestlers:	Times:	Date:	Location:	Notes:
Scott Anton & Erik Watts	1	March 3, 2001	Dothan, Alabama	Defeat Glacier & Jorge Estrada to become the first champions.
Glacier & Jorge Estrada	1	April 21, 2001	Cleveland, Tennessee	
The Public Enemy (Rocco Rock & Johnny Grunge)	1	July 7, 2001	Dothan, Alabama	Public Enemy also held the MECW Tag Team Championship at the time of the match.
Title is vacated in August 2001 when The Public Enemy leave the promotion to return to Main Event Championship Wrestling.
Southside Trash (Randy Harris & David Parrish)	1	September 15, 2001	Carrollton, Georgia	Defeated Jorge Estrada & Sonny Siaki to win the vacant titles.
Glacier (2) & "Big" Ron Studd	1	March 1, 2002	Carrollton, Georgia	
Title is vacated in 2002.
Jorge Estrada (2) & Sonny Siaki	1	July 27, 2002	Carrollton, Georgia	Defeated the Dobbins Brothers (Chad & Jason Dobbins) at the VFW Fairgrounds to win vacant title.
