= Desire (wrestler) =

American professional wrestler

Personal information
- Born: Kimberly Nielsen; June 2, 1973 (age 53) Falmouth, Michigan, United States

Professional wrestling career
- Ring name(s): Desire; Every Man's Desire; Kim Neilson; Miss Galaxy
- Billed height: 5 ft 8 in (173 cm)
- Billed weight: 145 lb (66 kg)
- Trained by: Dusty Rhodes
- Debut: August 25, 2001
- Retired: 2005

Kimberly Nielsen (born June 2, 1973) is an American retired professional wrestler and professional wrestling valet. She is best known for her appearances with NWA Total Nonstop Action from 2002 to 2004 under the ring name Desire.

== Professional wrestling career ==
After a career as a fitness competitor, which included placing eighth in the 2000 Miss Galaxy competition, Nielsen began training under Dusty Rhodes for a career in professional wrestling. She made her debut on August 25, 2001 in a mixed tag team match for Rhodes' Turnbuckle Championship Wrestling, where she and Jorge Estrada defeated Leilani Kai and Lodi in an intergender tag team match.

Nielsen was signed to a development contract by World Wrestling Entertainment in April 2002. She wrestled multiple matches at house shows along with dark matches at Jakked television tapings, facing opponents such as Dawn Marie and Ivory. She was sent to the WWE developmental territory Heartland Wrestling Association, but was released from her contract after the HWA was dropped as a developmental territory in July 2002.

Nielsen debuted in NWA Total Nonstop Action on December 12, 2002 as "Every Man's Desire", the valet of Sonny Siaki and a member of Sports Entertainment Xtreme. She debuted on January 15, 2003, defeating April Hunter in a match. She then began a feud with Trinity, which resulted in Desire teaming with Siaki in a series of matches against Trinity and Kid Kash. In June 2003 during a dark match, her back was broken after being fisherman suplexed onto the edge of the ring. She spent ten months recovering before returning to television in April 2004. Upon her return, she resumed her feud with Trinity. On June 23, Desire was defeated by Trinity in a stretcher match with help from the debuting Big Vito. As a result, on July 7, Trinity and Big Vito teamed to defeat Desire and Siaki in a tag team match. Her last appearance with the company was on September 8, 2004 in a 3-on-3 match, where she teamed with Erik Watts and Siaki to defeat Abyss, Alex Shelley and Goldy Locks.

In February 2005, Desire appeared with the Ring of Glory promotion in Chickamauga, Georgia, defeating Traci Brooks. She retired later that year after feeling uncomfortable with taking bumps following her back injury in addition to becoming pregnant with her third child.

== Personal life ==
Nielsen has three children. During her third pregnancy, Nielsen gained 80 lb (36 kg). After being unhappy over being overweight and at the suggestion of her then-partner Sonny Siaki, Nielsen successfully auditioned for The Biggest Loser. Originally weighing in at 252 pounds, she was the season's runner-up, losing 118 pounds by the season finale.
