= TNA 1st Anniversary Show =

2003 Total Nonstop Action Wrestling pay-per-view event

- Promotion: Total Nonstop Action Wrestling
- Date: June 18, 2003
- City: Nashville, Tennessee
- Venue: TNA Asylum
- Attendance: 1,000

TNA Anniversary Show chronology
← Previous; First	Next → 2nd

TNA 1st Anniversary Show (also known as NWA: TNA Anniversary and NWA-TNA PPV #50) was a professional wrestling pay-per-view event produced by Total Nonstop Action Wrestling (TNA), which took place on June 18, 2003, at the TNA Asylum in Nashville, Tennessee. The event commemorated the first anniversary of TNA's first event which took place on June 19, 2002. The event would later become known as Slammiversary in 2005.

Eleven matches were contested at the event with seven matches airing live on the pay-per-view. The main event was a tag team match, in which Sting made his TNA debut as Jeff Jarrett's tag team partner against AJ Styles and his mystery partner Syxx-Pac, which Jarrett and Sting won. In other prominent matches on the undercard, Triple X (Christopher Daniels and Elix Skipper) retained the NWA World Tag Team Championship against America's Most Wanted (Chris Harris and James Storm), New Jack defeated Mike Sanders in the semi-final match of the Hard 10 Tournament and Chris Sabin retained the X Division Championship against Paul London.

== Production ==
=== Storylines ===
TNA 1st Anniversary Show featured nine professional wrestling matches and one pre-show matches that involved different wrestlers from pre-existing scripted feuds and storylines. Wrestlers portrayed villains, heroes, or less distinguishable characters in the scripted events that built tension and culminated into a wrestling match or series of matches.

On June 11, AJ Styles defeated Jeff Jarrett and Raven in a three-way match to win the NWA World Heavyweight Championship after Vince Russo turned on Jarrett by hitting him with the guitar and aligned with Styles, leading to a double turn for Styles and Jarrett. Immediately after losing the title, Jarrett demanded a rematch for the title at the Anniversary Show but Styles refused and said he could give Jarrett, his title shot at any point within thirty days. Jarrett then demanded that he face Styles in a tag team match and gave Styles, the option to pick his tag team partner while announced that Sting would be Jarrett's partner at Anniversary Show.

On June 11, America's Most Wanted (Chris Harris and James Storm) defeated David Young and Traci to win the Anarchy Alliance Tournament despite interference by Triple X (Christopher Daniels and Elix Skipper). After the match, AMW challenged Triple X to a match for the NWA World Tag Team Championship at the Anniversary Show.

On June 11, Don West and Mike Tenay conducted an interview with Extreme Championship Wrestling alumni Jerry Lynn and Justin Credible over their ECW careers, during which the two got into a brawl after Lynn accused Credible of being Paul Heyman's "butt buddy" in ECW.

== Event ==
Before the event aired live on pay-per-view, matches were taped for the June 22 episode of Xplosion. In the first match, 3Live Kru (BG James, Konnan and Ron Killings) defeated Sal Rinauro, Tommy Vandal and Matt Vandal. In the second match, Trinity defeated Malia Hosaka. In the next match, Julio Dinero defeated Steve Madison. In the final taped match, Shark Boy defeated Delirious.

=== Preliminary matches ===
The event kicked off with a six-man tag team match, in which D-Lo Brown, Frankie Kazarian and The Sandman took on David Young, Don Harris and Sonny Siaki. Brown nailed a frog splash to Young for the win. After the match, Sports Entertainment Xtreme attacked Brown, Kazarian and Sandman until Jeff Jarrett and the debuting Sting made the save.

Next, Chris Sabin defended the NWA-TNA X Championship against Paul London. CM Punk interfered in the match after London executed a shooting star press on Sabin and Punk nailed a Raven Effect to London allowing Sabin to execute a fisherman buster to London to retain the title.

Next, the semi-final match of the Hard 10 Tournament took place between New Jack and Mike Sanders. Shark Boy handed over Incredible Hulk foam fist to Jack who hit Sanders with it causing Sanders to crash through a table. Jack was then awarded the win with a score of 10:7.

Next, Jerry Lynn took on Justin Credible. Lynn reversed a That's Incredible by Credible for a near-fall and then Credible reversed it into a pin and used the ropes for leverage to gain the victory. Lynn attacked Credible after the match and they brawled through the crowd.

Later, Perry Saturn took on Kenzo Suzuki. The match ended in a no contest after Lynn and Credible interfered in the match by brawling with each other.

In the penultimate match, Triple X (Christopher Daniels and Elix Skipper) defended the NWA World Tag Team Championship against America's Most Wanted (Chris Harris and James Storm). After avoiding a belt shot by Daniels, Storm superkicked Daniels and AMW nailed a Death Sentence to Daniels and Harris covered him for the pinfall but Low Ki pulled the referee out of the ring. The distraction allowed Skipper to hit Harris with the title belt and Daniels pinned him to retain the titles.

=== Main event match ===
The main event was a tag team match pitting AJ Styles and mystery partner Sean Waltman against Jeff Jarrett and Sting. The referee was knocked out after a superkick by Styles which allowed Vince Russo to hit Jarrett with a bat until Raven interfered to attack Russo but Shane Douglas attacked him. Jarrett then nailed a Stroke to Styles from the middle rope for the win.

== Aftermath ==
The feud between AMW and Triple X over the NWA World Tag Team Championship continued as the following week, on June 25, AMW defeated Christopher Daniels and Elix Skipper in the first-ever steel cage match to win the tag team titles on June 25.

On June 25, The Sandman defeated Sonny Siaki in the second semi-final of the Hard 10 Tournament. The tournament concluded on July 2, where Sandman defeated New Jack in the tournament final.

Jerry Lynn and Justin Credible continued their feud over the next three weeks, which led to Lynn defeating Credible in a Lights Out match on June 25, a Chain match on July 2 and a Last Man Standing match on July 9.

Jeff Jarrett continued his feud with Vince Russo by engaging in feuds with Russo's hand-picked wrestlers including Joe E. Legend and Christopher Daniels for the next three months. Jarrett received his rematch for the NWA World Heavyweight Championship against AJ Styles on October 22, where Jarrett defeated Styles which led to a double turn.

== Results ==
No.	Results	Stipulations	Times
1^{X}	3Live Kru (BG James, Konnan and Ron Killings) defeated Sal Rinauro, Tommy Vandal and Matt Vandal	Six-man tag team match	—
2^{X}	Trinity defeated Malia Hosaka	Singles match	—
3^{X}	Julio Dinero defeated Steve Madison	Singles match	—
4^{X}	Shark Boy defeated Delirious	Singles match	—
5	D-Lo Brown, Frankie Kazarian and The Sandman defeated David Young, Don Harris and Sonny Siaki	Six-man tag team match	3:53
6	Chris Sabin (c) defeated Paul London	Singles match for the NWA-TNA X Championship	7:53
7	New Jack (with Shark Boy) defeated Mike Sanders (10:7)	Hard 10 Tournament semi-final match	5:33
8	Justin Credible defeated Jerry Lynn	Singles match	2:43
9	Kenzo Suzuki versus Perry Saturn ended in a no contest	Singles match	4:35
10	Triple X (Christopher Daniels and Elix Skipper) (with Low Ki) (c) defeated America's Most Wanted (Chris Harris and James Storm)	Tag team match for the NWA World Tag Team Championship	7:03
11	Jeff Jarrett and Sting defeated AJ Styles and Syxx-Pac	Tag team match	11:49
(c) / – the champion(s) heading into the match; X / – the match was taped for a future broadcast of Xplosion
