= Glacier (wrestler) =

American professional wrestler and martial artist (born 1964)

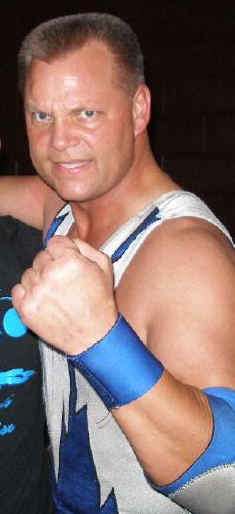
- Glacier in 2008

Personal information
- Born: Raymond M. Lloyd; May 13, 1964 (age 62) Brunswick, Georgia, U.S.
- Education: Valdosta State University

Professional wrestling career
- Ring name(s): Coach Buzz Stern; Glacier; Ray Lloyd
- Billed height: 6 ft 2 in (188 cm)
- Billed weight: 245 lb (111 kg)
- Billed from: Valdosta, Georgia; Shorinji Temple / Shinobi Temple, Fukuoka, Japan (as Glacier)
- Trained by: Mr. Wrestling II; Fred Avery; Bob Armstrong; WCW Power Plant
- Debut: 1987

Raymond Lloyd (born May 13, 1964) is an American martial artist, professional wrestler and actor. He is signed to All Elite Wrestling (AEW) as a coach and trainer. He is best known for his appearances with World Championship Wrestling from 1996 to 1999 under the ring name Glacier.

== Early life ==
Lloyd was born into a law-enforcement family in Brunswick, Georgia. His father, Harold, served as a commander with the Georgia State Patrol for 28 years; his mother, Lois, worked with the Georgia Driver's License Division prior to her retirement in 1999; and his fraternal twin brother, Ron, is a retired state trooper. A lifelong professional wrestling fan, Lloyd and his brother attended shows at the Jacksonville Coliseum. He graduated from Brunswick High School in 1982, and played offensive tackle for the school football team all four years, becoming its first All-State player in his senior year. He additionally competed for the track and field team, in the shot put and discus.

A skilled martial artist, Lloyd took up Hung Ga at fourteen, later adding other disciplines. His school was owned and taught by a former government agent and a U.S. Marshal, before it closed to the public in 1982. In 1983, he began competing for the World Karate Association in full-contact tournaments, eventually winning the United States Southeastern Super Heavyweight title. During his WKA stint, he was never knocked out or even knocked down; his only loss came on a disqualification. However, when the WKA changed its rules in 1985 to allow kicks from the knee up (they were previously only from the waist up), Lloyd opted to retire from competition in order not to jeopardize his football scholarship by risking injury. He played center for Valdosta State University (the same alma mater as former WCW announcer Scott Hudson), under coach Mike Cavan, and was a teammate of former Atlanta Falcons linebacker Jessie Tuggle during his collegiate career. Lloyd graduated in 1989 with a master's degree in education.

== Professional wrestling career ==
=== Early career (1987–1996) ===
Lloyd began his wrestling career shortly after graduation. He was trained by Georgia grappler Fred Avery in a makeshift ring set up in Avery's backyard, and then cut his teeth on the Georgia independent circuit for two years, during which he was given the ring name "Sugar Ray" Lloyd by Tommy Rich. Lloyd joined World Championship Wrestling (then the NWA) for their 1989 Great American Bash tour, in which his debut match was a loss to Butch Reed in Albany, Georgia. He recalled in a March 2001 interview with WCW Magazine, "To be in the same ring with a man that big who could move like that was intimidating."

Lloyd worked as an assistant high school football coach at Lassiter High in Marietta, and at Valdosta Junior High School, once organizing a one-time pro wrestling event in the Valdosta High school gymnasium in which he participated. During weekends he worked Southern Championship Wrestling shows while receiving further training from Mr. Wrestling II and Bob Armstrong. He moved to Atlanta in 1990, and again as "Sugar Ray" Lloyd, tag teamed with Swain as "The Blazers," named such after the Valdosta State athletic mascot. In 1991, Pro Wrestling Illustrated held a contest for readers to come up with a ring name for Swain. Lloyd additionally competed in the North Georgia Wrestling Alliance, alongside future WCW stars Scotty Riggs, Buff Bagwell, and Disco Inferno.

Lloyd's second stint in WCW was when he was booked to be defeated by The Great Muta at a house show in Atlanta. Following that match, at Muta's request, Lloyd joined Muta on a string of WCW house shows before he moved to Japan in 1993. He joined the UWFI as a guest of shootfighter Nobuhiko Takada, and competed against Japanese and American fighters. Lloyd returned to the United States after UWFI folded in 1996, and during a conversation with friend Diamond Dallas Page, he mentioned that he was planning to integrate martial arts into his wrestling, which he had been unable to do during the early days of his career. At Page's request, WCW president Eric Bischoff, a martial arts practitioner himself, met with Lloyd for three hours and signed him to a contract.

=== World Championship Wrestling (1996–1999) ===
==== Blood Runs Cold (1996–1998) ====
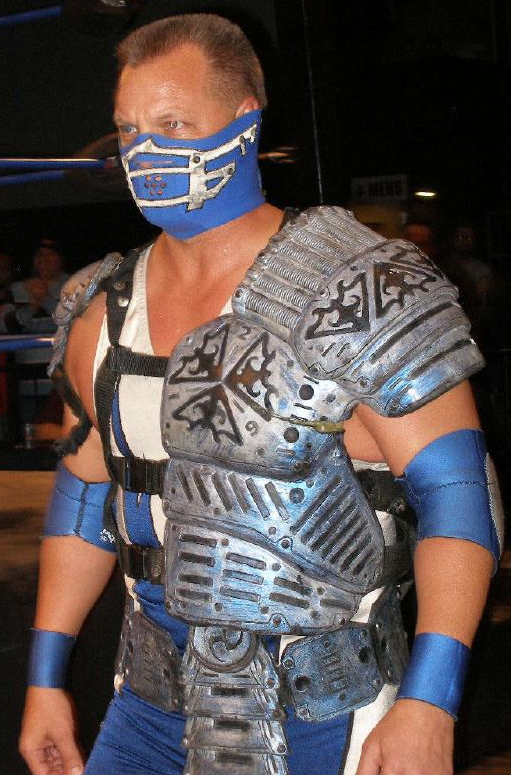
Glacier in 2008

Beginning in April 1996, Lloyd's new ring persona, Glacier, a gimmick similar to the Mortal Kombat character Sub-Zero, was introduced via a series of vignettes during WCW programming that featured the tagline Blood Runs Cold. He was fictionally profiled in the October 1996 issue of WCW Magazine as having traveled to Japan to study a fighting style that combined martial arts and pro wrestling maneuvers, with a 400-year-old helmet passed down to him by his master instructor, David Stater. He was then given the name "Glacier" by sensei Stater as a symbolization of the power of the elements.

Glacier was also given one of the most extravagant entrances in wrestling at the time, which consisted of blue laser lights streaming across the arena and synthetic snow falling from the ceiling, while the ring was enveloped in blue lighting. Production costs for the entrance amounted to nearly half a million dollars, while the costume and armor, designed by Andre Freitas of Atlanta-based AFX Studios, cost $35,000. The number 126 was carved into the armor's single breastplate as a reference to his father's badge number. Glacier wore a blue contact lens in his right eye to top off the outfit, which often prompted comments from WCW Monday Nitro analyst Bobby Heenan, such as "[He's] half man, half Siamese cat." After slowly walking to the ring, he then engaged in a ritual of standing on a center turnbuckle in order to remove his armor and mask, then somersaulting off the buckle and into the center of the ring to perform a kata routine; this process sometimes lasted as long as two minutes. Moreover, since he was a face character, he would bow to the referee and his opponent. To further accentuate the character's image, Lloyd, a natural brunette, temporarily bleached his hair blond from April to December 1997.

Glacier was originally intended to debut in July, but due to the coinciding appearance and immediate impact of the New World Order at the Bash at the Beach pay-per-view that month, his debut was delayed indefinitely; WCW worked this into a feud with Big Bubba Rogers, who criticized Glacier's hype and the overlong wait for his arrival during interviews on Nitro with the Dungeon of Doom. His debut finally occurred on the September 9, 1996 episode of Pro, when he pinned The Gambler in a match, which was also one of only two matches in which he executed his Cryonic Kick finisher off the top rope before it was changed to a spinning reverse roundhouse kick, and subsequently to a standard side kick. Glacier then defeated Bubba on his Nitro debut on September 16, ending the brief feud. The original costume and blue lighting were scrapped, however, after only his fourth match, a pinfall victory on Nitro over Mike Wenner on September 30. Following a subsequent ten-week hiatus off WCW television, he reappeared on Nitro on December 2, in which he debuted a new ring outfit and entrance music, then pinned Hardbody Harrison in a 60-second squash.

After spending the beginning of his WCW career in the midcard, it was not until March 1997 that Glacier was put into his first long-term feud, with Mortis, who was depicted in the new storyline as an Asian pitfighter who was one of eccentric manager James Vandenberg's collection of "rare oddities" and who had shared a history with Glacier. The angle was titled "Blood Runs Cold"; the slogan had not been used since the vignettes from the previous year had stopped airing.

Glacier defeated Mortis in the pay-per-view debut for both, at Uncensored on March 16, but after the match, Wrath made his first appearance as Vandenberg's then-unnamed newest charge, and both men double-teamed Glacier. Postmatch assaults by Mortis and Wrath became commonplace after Glacier's Nitro matches, and on the April 21 episode, his helmet was also stolen by the pair after he defeated Ciclope in less than one minute. His rematch with Mortis at Slamboree on May 18 ended in a disqualification after less than two minutes when Wrath attacked him from behind. Mortis and Wrath then had their way with Glacier for several minutes before he was rescued by Ernest "The Cat" Miller, who had entered the ring from the crowd.

On June 15, Glacier pinned Wrath at The Great American Bash, after which another beating commenced, this time after he was handcuffed to the top rope by Mortis, who himself had been cuffed to the turnbuckle prior to the match in order to prevent outside interference. The very next night on Nitro, Glacier again defeated Mortis and then was attacked for the last time by Mortis and Wrath after Miller again came to his rescue. From then until Bash at the Beach, Glacier wrestled as a tag unit with Miller, mainly in the lower card against luchadors. After Mortis and Wrath finally won their first encounter in the feud at Bash at the Beach on July 13 and ended Glacier's undefeated streak, WCW promptly shut down the angle due to the creative team's inability to further evolve the characters and the storyline. As a result, the backstory between Mortis and Glacier was therefore never revealed.

On September 1, nearly a year after he had made his official debut, Glacier was handed his first singles loss by Buff Bagwell. He and Miller lost their second consecutive pay-per-view affair in November, to the Faces of Fear at World War 3, and Glacier capped off the year with a squash at the hands of Bill Goldberg on December 27.

Despite an undefeated twelve-month singles period from September 1996 to August 1997, Glacier remained entrenched in the midcard ranks. He was booked as a heel for 1998, starting with an edition of WCW Saturday Night on January 24 in a rematch alongside Miller against Mortis and Wrath. Glacier and Miller were to fight each other two weeks earlier on the program, but it was called off after Glacier was attacked by Mortis and Wrath offscreen beforehand. However, during the tag match, Glacier turned on Miller, allowing Mortis and Wrath to get the win. This brought the "Blood Runs Cold" angle to an official close as Mortis and Wrath were split up from Vandenberg and moved into the singles ranks.

==== Feud with Perry Saturn and injury (1998–1999) ====
Glacier spent the next three months on a losing streak, losing matches to the likes of Steve McMichael, Prince Iaukea, and Lex Luger on Nitro and Thunder, while feuding on the side with Chris Adams on WCW Saturday Night in a battle of superkick finishers.

Glacier then entered a feud with Perry Saturn, starting with an angle in which he cut a promo on the May 11 Nitro declaring that his Cryonic Kick finisher was his own move and threatened to take out anyone who used it. This prompted a response from Saturn on Thunder later in the week, in which he lambasted Glacier for his in-ring appearance and his claiming ownership of the superkick. Starting with a pin of Sick Boy on May 18 after Saturn's outside interference was unsuccessful, Glacier then fought a series of matches against several other members of Raven's Flock. He and Saturn then alternated wins on WCW Thunder, but the most notable aspect of the angle was that Kanyon, who had recently shed the Mortis gimmick, was regularly conducting sneak attacks on Raven and the Flock in various disguises. On the June 4 edition of Thunder, Kanyon (disguised as referee Nick Patrick) entered the ring and took out Saturn with a Russian legsweep, allowing Glacier to get the win, and flashed the Mortis mask to Glacier before leaving the ring. The feud died down shortly thereafter when Saturn was moved to a new angle involving Raven and the breakup of the Flock. A Glacier-Saturn matchup (won by Saturn) that aired on WCW Worldwide on September 26 was the last match broadcast on the program before its format was changed to a recap show.

Glacier suffered a severe knee injury during the main event on Nitro on June 29, in which he lost to then-United States champion Goldberg for the fourth time in what would be his only title challenge in WCW. He kept the extent of the injury hidden until after the match and left the ring under his own power, but after rehabilitation proved unsuccessful, he underwent knee surgery. He was out until the November 5 Thunder, where he offered his support to Miller, who himself had undergone a heel turn. One week later, he returned to ring action for the first time in over four months, and debuted his new finisher, a version of Terry Gordy's Oriental thumb spike (dubbed the "Ice Pick"), for a submission victory over Adams.

On November 16, Glacier, Kanyon, and Wrath reunited for the first and only time since the demise of Blood Runs Cold, when Glacier and Kanyon were scheduled to face each other on Nitro after Wrath fought Raven in the previous match, but Raven's refusal to wrestle, despite goading by Kanyon, saw it called off. Wrath then took out his frustration by pummeling both Glacier and Kanyon inside the ring before their opening bell, but the match commenced nonetheless with Kanyon ultimately scoring the pin. Glacier made his final WCW pay-per-view appearance with a loss to Wrath at World War 3 on November 22, and closed out the year with another series of matches against Saturn on Thunder and Saturday Night, in which Miller's manager, Sonny Onoo, repeatedly interfered.

By early 1999, Glacier was again booked to lose to lower-card opponents so that WCW could finally bury the character and allow Lloyd to transition into a new one. This came to a head on February 6, when he was pinned on Saturday Night by Al Green. Five days later, a series of skits aired on Thunder in which Glacier, tired of his gimmick, sold his armor, mask, and helmet to Kaz Hayashi and Miller; Onoo convinced the gullible Hayashi to buy the gear for ten times Glacier's asking price. For a short time, Miller came out to Glacier's music and entrance, while Hayashi wore his armor and mask to the ring.

Though Lloyd had not appeared on television following the end of Glacier, he, along with Gene Okerlund, Alex Wright, and other WCW personalities, attended the public grand opening of the Nitro Grill at the Excalibur Hotel and Casino in Las Vegas on May 22, 1999; the restaurant lasted only sixteen months and closed in September 2000.

==== Coach Buzz Stern (1999) ====
On August 19, Lloyd made his first televised appearance in six months, this time on Thunder in the first of several promos as Coach Buzz Stern, featuring longtime independent wrestler Luther Biggs. The clips were filmed at the WCW Power Plant and served to introduce the storyline of Stern choosing the clumsy Biggs as his protege, and aired until the end of September, when Biggs was pinned by Bobby Eaton in his in-ring debut on Thunder; Stern put Biggs in a postmatch full nelson as punishment. Over the following month, Stern served as Biggs' manager for only three additional matches: a squash loss to Meng on Thunder, a pinfall victory over Dave Burkhead on Saturday Night, and a match against Barry Darsow (wrestling as Blacktop Bully) on Worldwide, which Biggs won only after Stern's outside interference. Though the Stern character was inspired by Lloyd's days as a high school football coach prior to his WCW career, and had received buildup in Mark Madden's weekly WCW.com column, he received an indifferent reception from fans, and after Lloyd himself wrestled his only match as Stern in a November 4 Thunder loss to Eddie Guerrero, the angle was shelved and both Stern and Biggs were removed from television. Lloyd was one of many wrestlers released by the company on November 21, 1999 as part of a cost-cutting measure.

==== Return (2000–2001) ====
During WCW's Mayhem pay-per-view on November 26, a Glacier promo from 1996 was re-broadcast, this time with the tagline "Blood Runs Colder," after which he was openly buried by the announce team. The promos were aired infrequently on Nitro and Thunder, and during Starrcade. The night after Starrcade, Norman Smiley was seen on Nitro watching a promo on a backstage monitor, then happily reacting to having "a real hero" in WCW.

Lloyd returned to WCW in January 2001, and Glacier was now played out in the angle as a superhero parody, with him pledging to watch Smiley's back during matches. In separate contests against Mike Awesome and Bam Bam Bigelow on Thunder, an overpowered Smiley lost decisively both times because Glacier took his time coming to the ring in order to interact with fans. He then entered the ring after the fact to pose for the fans before pushing Smiley out of the way to perform his old kata routine. Though Lloyd never wrestled an actual match, the gimmick was a surprisingly mild success given the previous history of the character (a fan during the Bigelow match was seen on camera holding a sign that read "Glacier is My Hero"), but the angle abruptly ended and Glacier was not seen again following a skit on the February 7 edition of Thunder in which he was pummeled offscreen by Sean O'Haire inside his dressing room.

=== Independent circuit (2000–present) ===
Along with Dusty Rhodes, Lloyd co-founded Turnbuckle Championship Wrestling (TCW) in 2000, which held shows throughout the Southeast and whose roster featured additional WCW castoffs such as Scotty Anton (Scotty Riggs), Barry Windham, Big Ron Studd, and Chad Fortune. Lloyd wrestled under his real name, and was the TCW Heavyweight Champion from July to October 2000, when he was dethroned by Windham.

After Lloyd left WCW (which ceased operations six weeks later) permanently and returned to the independent circuit. On April 21, he won the TCW tag belts with Jorge Estrada. One of the highlights of Lloyd's wrestling career was fulfilling a childhood dream of winning the NWA World tag team titles, which he accomplished with Jason Sugarman on December 28, 2002, but Sugarman retired shortly after due to a career-ending injury. In 2002, he rejuvenated his Glacier gimmick to team with Big Ron Studd, with whom he won the tag title for the second time in his TCW stint on January 3, and then enjoyed a second reign as TCW Heavyweight Champion.

After TCW folded in 2003, Lloyd made sporadic appearances with Georgia Championship Wrestling, and held a backstage position with TNA Wrestling. He again wrestled as Glacier as part of Ultimate Christian Wrestling's Ultimate Armageddon Tour 2006, and participated in the CHIKARA King of Trios tournament in Philadelphia on March 2, 2008, teaming with Los Ice Creams as their mystery partner in a first-round loss against Team Mexico. Lloyd also feuded with TNA and IWA star Ricky Vega on the Florida independent Circuit in 2008.

He then made a return appearance in the 2009 King of Trios tournament on March 27, 2009, teaming with Al Snow and D'Lo Brown in another first-round loss, this time against The UnStable of Vin Gerard, Colin Delaney, and STIGMA.

He would make his return to a major wrestling promotion on August 26, 2017, when he entered at #20 in Ring of Honor's 2017 Honor Rumble, where he would be eliminated by Bully Ray.

=== All Elite Wrestling (2019, 2024–present) ===
On May 25, 2019, Lloyd made an appearance at the debut PPV for All Elite Wrestling, Double or Nothing, taking part in the Casino Battle Royal. He was eliminated by MJF. In June 2024, it was reported that Lloyd was hired full-time by AEW as a coach and trainer.

== Acting career ==
In addition to wrestling, Lloyd has pursued an acting career in both film and television. He had auditioned (unsuccessfully) for a part on the CBS program Walker, Texas Ranger back in 1997, and though he had expressed interest in an acting career in an interview with WCW journalist Chad Damiani the next year, he finally appeared in his first film, a low-budget movie titled Blood Bath, in 2002. He guest-starred in the season finale of the USA Network series Burn Notice, which aired on September 20, 2007. Lloyd also worked as a stuntman at Disney-MGM Studios in Orlando, Florida, playing the part of a German flight engineer in the Indiana Jones Epic Stunt Spectacular! show until November 2004. In 2025, Lloyd was the leading role in the movie The Unbreakable Bunch.

== Personal life ==
Lloyd participated in the annual Monsters Celebrity Bowling Tournament on June 30, 2012 at Boardwalk Bowling in Orlando for the non-profit organization Rock Pink in conjunction with The Monsters in the Morning radio show to raise breast cancer awareness.

== Championships and accomplishments ==
=== Martial arts ===
- World Karate Association
  - Southeastern Super Heavyweight Full Contact Karate Champion

=== Professional wrestling ===
- AWA World-1 South
  - AWA Southern Heavyweight Championship (1 time)
- Georgia All-Star Wrestling
  - GASW Tag Team Championship (1 time, last) – with R.D. Swain
- Georgia Championship Wrestling
  - GCW Tag Team Championship (1 time) – with R.D. Swain
- National Wrestling Alliance
  - NWA World Tag Team Championship (1 time) – with Jason Sugarman
- Peach State Wrestling
  - PSW United States Tag Team Championship (2 times, first) – with R.D. Swain
- Pro Wrestling Illustrated
  - PWI ranked him # 488 of the 500 best singles wrestlers of the PWI Years in 2003
- Turnbuckle Championship Wrestling
  - TCW Heavyweight Championship (2 times)
  - TCW Tag Team Championship (2 times) – with Jorge Estrada (1), Big Ron Studd (1)
- United States Wrestling Alliance
  - USWA Tag Team Championship (1 time) - with Jesse Neal
- Universal Independent Wrestling
  - UIW Heavyweight Championship (1 time)

== Filmography ==
=== Film ===
Year	Title	Role	Notes
2002	Blood Bath	Thorko	
2005	Hell's End	Future Soldier	
2006	Popsy	Bodyguard #2	
2007	Loaded Dice	Uno	
2010	River of Darkness	Clark Higgins	
2011	Kerberos	Big John	
2014	A Free Bird	Lonnie	
2014	Attack of the Morningside Monster	Joe Martino	
2016	Ta Daaaa: The Great Orecto	The Great Orecto	Short film
2017	Stop Doing That	Charles Betterman	Short film
2017	Slaw	Himself	
2021	The Replaceables	Jock Holiday	
2025	The Unbreakable Bunch		

=== Television ===
Year	Title	Role	Notes
2007	Burn Notice	Nydam	Episode: "Loose Ends, Part 2"
2009	Meet the Browns	Cop	Episode: "Meet the Couch Potato"

=== Video games ===
Year	Title	Notes
1997	WCW vs. nWo: World Tour	Boss character
1998	WCW/nWo Revenge	
1999	WCW/nWo Thunder	Unlockable character
