= Luther Biggs =

American professional wrestler

Personal information
- Born: Pontiac, Michigan, United States

Professional wrestling career
- Ring name(s): Big Sexy; Burnin' Love; Luther Biggs; Disgraceland
- Trained by: WCW Power Plant
- Debut: 1988
- Retired: 2003

Luther Biggs is an American professional wrestler, who has competed in North American independent promotions including the United States Wrestling Association (USWA), Total Nonstop Action Wrestling (TNA) and had a short stint in World Championship Wrestling (WCW) during the late 1990s, most notably as one half of the tag team Hard Knox with Killer Kyle and manager Coach Buzz Stern. He has also acted in several films, using the stage name Luther Wilson.

== Career ==
=== Early career ===
During the mid-1990s, Biggs competed in the Memphis-based United States Wrestling Association (USWA) as part of the stable the Country Boys along with Billy Joe Travis and Doomsday.

=== World Championship Wrestling (1996-1997, 1999) ===
Although he had appeared in WCW several years before as "Big Sexy" Luther Biggs losing a match to Ice Train on WCW Saturday Night on December 14 and WCW Pro on December 29, 1996, he was later introduced by wrestler turned manager Coach Buzz Stern (who had previously wrestled as Glacier) as his new "protege" during WCW Thunder selecting him as part of his "Winners Club" on September 2, 1999.

After appearing in subsequent vignettes as a somewhat clumsy varsity wrestler training with Stern, he made his debut on WCW Thunder losing to Bobby Eaton on September 30. After losing to Eaton, Stern attacked Eaton applying a full nelson hold on Eaton and then applying the hold on Biggs.

Regularly appearing on WCW Thunder and WCW Worldwide, while he continued to lose to mid-card wrestlers such as Meng, he also had some success while on WCW Worldwide and WCW Saturday Night against the Blacktop Bully on October 23 although his victory was due only to his manager's interference. He was released along with Stern and many other WCW wrestlers at the end of 1999.

=== Return to the independent circuit ===
In 2001, he appeared in NWA Wildside defeating his old manager Coach Buzz Stern on March 17. The following night, he appeared at ringside with "Big" Ron Studd in a handicap match against Damien Steele and The Underdoggs and later defeated Romeo Bliss during the event. He also began wrestling for Dusty Rhodes's Florida-based Turnbuckle Championship Wrestling as "Lethal" Luther Biggs losing to Bobby Hayes and, later that night, appeared in a tag team match with Larry Zbyszko against Dusty Rhodes and New Jack in Carrollton, Georgia on June 30.

Defeating Sean Evans in Woodstock, Georgia on December 7, he later lost to Jorge Estrada on December 28. He defeated Steve Madison on December 29 and Jason Sugarman on January 26, 2002.

=== Total Nonstop Action Wrestling (2003) ===
In 2003, Biggs resurfaced in NWA: Total Nonstop Action as Disgraceland who was introduced by Glen Gilberti as the newest member of the stable Sports Entertainment Xtreme after his debut defeating Shark Boy in Nashville, Tennessee on February 19, 2003. Following the match, Jorge Estrada of The Flying Elvises confronted Biggs over his Elvis impersonator gimmick and was attacked by Biggs, Gilberti and Mike Sanders who later dragged Estrada backstage to the S.E.X. dressing room and flushed his head in a toilet. Two weeks later, he would lose to Estrada after Gilberti and Sanders left ringside on March 5, 2003.

=== Later career ===
He also teamed with Ron Reis to defeat Gilligan and Scotty Beach at the Rock N' Shock Benefit Show on September 16, 2006. He also appeared with Lloyd and other celebrities such as musician Mark Wills and comedian Wix Wichman at the Steve Azar St. Cecilia Foundation Benefit Concert in 2007.
