= TNA 2nd Anniversary Show =

2004 Total Nonstop Action Wrestling pay-per-view event

- Promotion: Total Nonstop Action Wrestling
- Date: June 23, 2004
- City: Nashville, Tennessee
- Venue: TNA Asylum
- Attendance: 1,250

TNA Anniversary Show chronology
← Previous; Last	Next → 2005

TNA 2nd Anniversary Show (also known as Slammiversary (2004)) was a professional wrestling pay-per-view event produced by Total Nonstop Action Wrestling (TNA), which took place on June 23, 2004, at the TNA Asylum in Nashville, Tennessee. The event succeeded the promotion's first anniversary show and celebrated the second anniversary of TNA's first event held on June 19, 2002.

Nine matches were contested at the event, with six airing live on the pay-per-view. The event featured three championship matches including the main event, where Jeff Jarrett retained the NWA World Heavyweight Championship against Ron Killings after the match ended in a no contest. Also at the event, AJ Styles retained the X Division Championship against the debuting Jeff Hardy after the match ended in a no contest and America's Most Wanted (Chris Harris and James Storm) retained the NWA World Tag Team Championship against Miyamoto and Nosawa.

== Production ==
=== Storylines ===
On June 2, Ron Killings lost the NWA World Heavyweight Championship in the first-ever King of the Mountain match to Jeff Jarrett, also involving AJ Styles, Chris Harris and Raven. On June 9, Jarrett competed against all three members of Killings' faction 3Live Kru, defeating Konnan in a strap match and BG James in a Trailer Park Trash match but lost to Killings in a Ghetto Justice match. On the June 11 episode of Impact!, Dusty Rhodes announced that Jarrett would defend the title against Killings at the 2nd Anniversary Show. On the June 18 episode of Impact!, Vince Russo added a stipulation into the match that if Jarrett got disqualified then he would lose the title.

In a controversial angle Killings apparently won the NWA Championship for the third time after hitting Jarrett with a guitar that was meant for him. After a crisis of conscience moment for Russo he ultimately decided that the title should be returned to Jarrett after a week, even though his heart clearly wasn't in his decision due to animosity with Jarrett. While Killings would fight for the NWA Championship in the near future he would not win it again.

== Results ==
No.	Results	Stipulations	Times
1^{X}	Chris Sabin and Elix Skipper defeated Kid Krazy and Mikal Adryan	Tag team match	—
2^{X}	Team Canada (Bobby Roode, Eric Young and Petey Williams) (with Scott D'Amore) defeated Danny Daniels, Nate Webb and Ryan Boz	Six-man tag team match	—
3^{X}	Sabu defeated Lonestar	Singles match	—
4	America's Most Wanted (Chris Harris and James Storm) (c) defeated Miyamoto and Nosawa	Tag team match for the NWA World Tag Team Championship	9:50
5	Trinity defeated Desire	Stretcher match	9:50
6	Jerry Lynn defeated Scott D'Amore	Singles match	15:20
7	Mascarita Sagrada defeated Mini Pierroth	Singles match	8:14
8	AJ Styles (c) vs. Jeff Hardy ended in a no contest	Singles match for the TNA X Division Championship	7:00
9	Jeff Jarrett (c) vs. Ron Killings ended in a no contest	Singles match for the NWA World Heavyweight Championship	14:00
(c) / – the champion(s) heading into the match; X / – the match was taped for a future broadcast of Xplosion
