= Steve Madison =

American professional wrestler (born 1983)

Personal information
- Born: Stephen Phillip Favata; April 9, 1983 (age 43) Tampa, Florida, United States

Professional wrestling career
- Ring name(s): Steve Madison; Moose Madison
- Billed height: 5 ft 10 in (1.78 m)
- Billed weight: 220 lb (100 kg)
- Trained by: Steve Keirn; Jimmy Del Ray
- Debut: 2001

Stephen Philip Favata (born April 9, 1983) is an American professional wrestler, known by his ringname "Modern Miracle" Steve Madison, who competes in Southeastern independent promotions including AWA World-1 South, Full Impact Pro, Future of Wrestling, NWA Florida and Dusty Rhodes' Turnbuckle Championship Wrestling. While in NWA Florida, he was part of the heel stable 911 Incorporated with Ron Niemi, Rod Steel, Eric Loy and The Shane Twins. He was also a member of The Young, Rich & Ready with Chasyn Rance and Kenny King.

Madison has also made appearances in Ring of Honor, Total Nonstop Action Wrestling and WWE, including its developmental territories Deep South Wrestling and Florida Championship Wrestling, as well Japanese promotions Big Mouth Loud, Fighting World of Japan Pro Wrestling and New Japan Pro-Wrestling. He formed successful tag teams with Erick Stevens and Lex Lovett while touring Japan.

== Career ==
=== Early life and career ===
Stephen Favata was born in Tampa, Florida and graduated in 2001 from George D. Chamberlain High School, lettering four years in baseball and leading as Senior Class President. Madison was offered several baseball scholarships to small colleges, but turned them down to start wrestling. Steve decided to attend the University of South Florida while starting his professional wrestling training.

His wrestling training started in the summer of 2001 with current WWE Talent Agent Steve Keirn and Jimmy Del Ray of the tag team, The Heavenly Bodies. Steve adopted the "Madison" last name over a lunch meeting with former NWA President Howard Brody, after deciding that the last name "Favata" would not suit him well in the wrestling business.

On December 28, 2001, Madison wrestled future tag team partner Lex Lovett at a house show for Turnbuckle Championship Wrestling, a Georgia-based promotion owned by Dusty Rhodes, and was pinned by Lovett after a modified DDT.

In November 2002, Madison and David Babylon were the co-winners of an interpromotional NWA Florida vs. Future of Wrestling battle royal in which the winners would receive a title shot against the NWA Florida Unified Cruiserweight Champion Naphtali. Madison had been accompanied by Lex Lovett and Jimmy Del Rey while Babylon had FOW promoter Bobby Rogers and Vanessa Harding in his corner. The following month, he defeated the NWA Florida Heavyweight Championship against Agent Steele at NWA Florida's Total Annihilation.

On January 22, 2003, Madison and Agent Steele appeared in a dark match for NWA: Total Nonstop Action show against The Strong Brothers (Sedrick and Roderick Strong).

=== Touring Japan and Europe (2003-2004) ===
In mid-February 2003, Madison received a phone call from Steve Kiern who offered him a spot on an upcoming tour of Japan with Riki Choshu's Fighting World of Japan Pro Wrestling promotion. Looking for younger American wrestlers unfamiliar to Japanese fans, Choshu had become interested in several students from Keirn's wrestling school. Tiger Hattori, the American booker for Fighting World of Japan, had visited the school scouting for wrestlers to tour the country. Madison, Big Vito and the Shane Twins would be signed for the first tour and were joined by Lex Lovett on the second tour.

Madison made his first trip to Japan at the age of 19 for new upstart Japanese promotion, World Japan. After his first match against Kenzo Suzuki, he was complimented by Riki Choshu. Madison headlined the Nagareyama Citizen Gymnasium on March 20, 2003, battling Kensuke Sasaki in the main event, making him one of the youngest gaijin of all time to headline a singles match in Japan. The match was watched by The Road Warriors who came out to ringside. On his second tour, he teamed with Big Van Vader to wrestle Takao Omori and Koichiro Kimura during the prologue of the Magna02 Series.

Briefly returning to Florida, he was preparing for his third tour of Japan. Shortly after wrestling Mike Graham and David Babylon, he was hospitalized for appendicitis and had emergency surgery. According to doctors, his appendix was about 24 hours from rupturing. He had already been scheduled to appear for the Magna03 Series but called Hattori to cancel the tour. However, he was back in the gym within three weeks and was eventually cleared to wrestle in Japan the day of the first tour. He later went on to team with Riki Chosyu against Yoji Anjo & Koichiro Kimura at the Tsubame Civic Gym in Niigata Prefecture on October 22 and, teaming with Lex Meyer, against Takao Omori & Shiro Koshinaka at the Thajo City Gym in Miyagi. Three days later, he returned to NWA Florida to wrestle Scoot Andrews at the Leaman School in St. Petersburg.

After several tours with World Japan, Madison teamed with Mike Shane, subbing for Mike's brother, Todd Shane, for several dates with the World Wrestling Council in Puerto Rico. Soon after that, Madison ventured to Europe, along with Dennis Knight and Jeff Bradley, to wrestle for EWA Wrestling in Austria. On May 14, 2004, Madison faced and lost to Ahmed Chear in a match to crown the first EWA Middleweight Champion in Wolfsburg, Austria. Madison was then booked by Tiger Hattori to participate for New Japan Pro-Wrestling in the summer of 2004. An ankle injury suffered two weeks before the tour postponed Madison's debut in New Japan.

=== NWA Florida & Full Impact Pro (2004-2005) ===
In the fall, Madison had sufficiently recovered from his injury to win the NWA Florida Heavyweight Championship from Todd Shane on September 4, 2004. He defended the title for the next three months with victories over Michael Shane and Vordell Walker before losing the belt to Bruce Steel in a 3-way dance with Roderick Strong on November 20.

On January 8, 2005, he defeated Sal Rinauro at a show for Full Impact Pro. Less than a week later, he made his first WWE appearance in a tag team match with Shannon Moore against The Shane Twins (Mike & Todd) in a dark match on the January 13th edition of SmackDown!. He spent the next six months wrestling for NWA Florida and FIP. Feuding with "Miami Pound Machine" Rod Steel and occasionally teaming with Antonio Banks in NWA Florida, he was frequently featured in high-profile matches in FIP. On February 11, he lost a gauntlet match to Vordell Walker which included Azriael, Roderick Strong, Rainman and Sal Rinauro. He and Rinauro later lost to DP Associates (Jimmy Rave & Fast Eddie) on March 25.

On April 22, he entered the FIP Tag Team Title Tournament with James Gibson but lost to Spanky & Sal Rinauro in the opening rounds. Madison faced James Gibson in a singles match the following night beating him after using a chain wrapped around his fist. Madison would go on to win a string of victories against Jay Fury, Aaron Epic, Rainman and Kahagus during the next two months. Alternately, he worked in the tag team division during his last weeks in NWA Florida. He and Lex Lovett lost to 911 Incorporated (Rod & Bruce Steele) on May 6 and, with Erick Stevens, against The Strong Brothers (Roderick & Sedrick Strong) at the 2005 Peterson Cup tournament on June 10. He wrestled his last match for NWA Florida defeating Buck Quartermain via disqualification on June 17.

=== Full Impact Pro and the indy circuit (2005-2006) ===
On July 22, Madison participated in the Elite Wrestling Entertainment's debut show Florida's Strongest Tournament. He defeated Scott Davis in the opening round but lost to Buck Quartermain in the second via countout. On July 30, he and Chris Kanyon fought to a double-disqualification against Buck Quartermaine & Roderick Strong. On August 5, he lost a match to Homicide for the FIP Heavyweight Championship. The next night, he teamed with Erick Stevens to defeat The Masked FIPers (Masked FIPer I & Masked FIPer II). On August 19, Madison teamed with Erick Stevens and Chris Kanyon at an EWE show and lost to Buck Quartermain and The Marker Crashers in a no disqualification match.

On August 20, Madison made a one-time appearance for Ring of Honor defeating Davey Andrews at ROH Do or Die 5. He also appeared in the main event losing to Sal Rinauro in a 4-way match to receive a contract with the promotion. The other participants included Claudio Castagnoli and Jerelle Clark. On August 27, he and Stevens returned to EWE to defeat The Market Crashers via disqualification. Two days later, Madison and Quartermain appeared together in a handicap match against The Big Show on WWE Raw. He also appeared on the September 1 edition of SmackDown! losing to Hardcore Holly. The match was later broadcast on WWE Velocity. During the next two days, he lost to Tony Mamaluke and Jerrelle Clark & Jay Fury in a tag team match with Erick Stevens.

Madison also appeared for new Japanese group, Big Mouth Loud, on their inaugural show on September 11, 2005, at Korakuen Hall teaming with Buck Quartermain against Japanese wrestling legend, Riki Choshu, and Choshu's student, Takashi Uwano. Madison claimed victory on Uwano at 10 minutes 5 seconds with the Axe Bomber.

At IPW Hardcore Wrestling's Reunion show, Madison defeated Antonio Banks on September 17. In FIP the next month, he and Stevens lost to Dunn & Marcos in a three-way match with Jay Fury & Jerrelle Clark on October 7, but beat Clark & Fury in a regular tag team match the following night. He started wrestling in single matches around this time defeating Frankie Capone in his debut for Pro Wrestling Warfare on November 5. During the next two months, he also had matches against Derrick Dempsey, Jerrelle Clark and Colt Cabana in FIP and both Andy Douglas and Chris Kanyon in PWW. He and Erick Stevens also teamed up once again in FIP and lost to Jay Fury & Jerrelle Clark on December 10, 2005.

At FIP's "Big Year One Bash: The Hangover", a supercard celebrating the one-year anniversary of FIP's first show, Madison and Stevens lost to Fury & Clark in a gauntlet match for a title shot at FIP Tag Team Champions The Heartbreak Express (Sean & Phil Davis). They later attacked Fury & Clark in their match against Evan Starsmore & Jaison Moore, giving them each piledrivers, and costing them the match.

=== Miracle Violence Connection (2005-2006) ===
Madison eventually teamed up with fellow Florida standout, Erick Stevens, and formed a tag team called the Miracle Violence Connection, a name that was originally used by "Dr. Death" Steve Williams and Terry "Bam Bam" Gordy in Japan. The team originally formed in late 2005 and called themselves "The Miracle Violence Connection 2005" and in 2006, renamed themselves "The Miracle Violence Connection 2006".

On January 6, 2006, Steve Madison defeated Salvatore Rinauro in a singles match. The next night, he and Stevens beat Rinauro and Colt Cabana in a tag team match. Madison had less luck in PWW losing a tag team match, with Donovan Morgan, to The Down Boyz on January 13 and a rematch against Chris Kanyon the following night. Another loss against Jerrelle Clark & Jay Fury on January 20 prompted a falling out between Madison and Stevens. The next night, they faced each other in a match with ended in a double-knockout. The match was held at an event by Elite Wrestling Entertainment.

He also made two appearances in Deep South Wrestling losing to Frankie Capone on January 26 and Frankie Ciatso on February 16. He also lost to Sal Rinauro at a FIP show the next night. On February 25, Madison defeated Tom Carter and Andy Douglas at an event for Pro Wrestling Warfare. He also won that night's main event which was a "Bring Your Own Weapons" Steel Cage Battle Royal. On March 8, he and Osamu Nishimura beat Donovan Morgan & Lex Lovett at an EWE show. Madison made two more appearances for EWE in April fighting Mike Sullivan to a no-contest on April 1 and lost a tag team match with Kevin Sullivan against Mike Graham & Lex Lovett at the end of the month.

Madison and Erick Stevens feuded with Colt Cabana & Sal Rinauro in FIP during April, however they soon began fighting each other. On April 8, the team of Madison & Stevens broke up when Madison turned on Stevens after a tag match at a Full Impact Pro event. Madison eventually brought in Shingo Takagi as a "hired assassin" and who defeated Stevens on June 9. Madison was also involved in the main event which pitted him in a six-way match against Austin Aries, Davey Richards, Roderick Strong, Canadian Cougar and Colt Cabana who ended up winning the contest. With single victories over Jerrelle Clark and Ace Rockwell, Madison defeated Erick Stevens in a Grudge match on June 10.

On July 1, Madison lost to Scott Davis in a 3-way match with Buck Quartermaine at a Pro Wrestling World 1 show.

=== The Young, Rich & Ready (2006-2007) ===
During the summer of 2006, Madison formed a faction called The Young, Rich & Ready, or "The YRR", with Chasyn Rance & Kenny King. The three made their debut at a FIP event on July 7, 2006, when Madison and Rance defeated Seth Delay & Erick Stevens in a tag team match with outside help from Kenny King. Madison also defeated Erick Stevens in a singles match the following night. On July 19, he appeared at a show for Innovative Wrestling Experience teaming with Marcus Hall to beat The Blue Assassin & Butch Long. Madison remained in IWE for several weeks feuding with The Blue Assassin and eventually lost to him in a "Hair vs Mask" match on August 30. However, the IWE President intervened by suspending Madison before the stipulation could be carried out.

On September 8, the YRR returned to FIP to defeat Roderick Strong, Seth Delay & Erick Stevens in Inverness, Florida. The show, Second Year Spectacular: Night 1, was part of a two-day supercard celebrating the second anniversary of FIP. He faced Erick Stevens in a singles match the next night in Crystal River. Madison lost to Stevens in singles matches during the next two weeks, the last being a Human Cage match at an event for the Alliance Wrestling Force on September 16. Madison recovered by beating Stevens' tag team partner Seth Delay on October 13 and, the next night, he and Chasyn Rance defeated Erick Stevens & Sal Rinauro. He would, however, lose to stablemate Kenny King at a Division I Pro Wrestling event on October 27.

On November 4, Madison won an "Over the Top Rope" Battle Royal to become the number one contender for the Sunray Pro Wrestling Heavyweight Championship then held by his old rival Erick Stevens. Facing the champion in the main event that same night, he defeated Stevens to win the title.

Back in FIP, he and Rance defeated Rhett Titus & Alex Sugarfoot Payne on November 10. The next night, Madison teamed with American Dragon, Davey Richards, Shane Hagadorn and SHINGO as Team Dragon in a 10-man elimination match with Team Strong captained by FIP Heavyweight Champion Roderick Strong, FIP Tag Team Champions The Briscoe Brothers, Erick Stevens and Pelle Primeau. Strong & The Briscoe Brothers ended up winning the contest. Madison was given a shot at the FIP heavyweight title a month later but lost to Strong on December 15. The YRR (Madison, Rance, King and Rinauro) defeated Seth Delay, Jerrelle Clark and Black Market (Shawn Murphy and Joey Machete) the following night.

On January 1, 2007, Madison appeared on WWE Heat losing to Super Crazy. The match was later broadcast on WWE Raw. On January 12, he and Rance defeated Black Market. Madison also faced Erick Stevens in back-to-back matches during the next two days. The first was a bloody Dog Collar match for FIP and the second for AWA World 1 South in Valdosta, Georgia, Madison losing in both these encounters.

A week later, he won a six-way match against Jerrelle Clark, Kahagus, Spanky Malone, Leon Scott and David Mercury at an AWF show. He spent the next few weeks in American Combat Wrestling with victories over Twizted Vengeance, "Latin Sensation" Ricky Romeo and Shaun Hill. He also defeated ACW Cruiserweight Champion Nooie Lee in a non-title match on February 13. On February 17, he lost to Scotty Riggs at another AWA World 1 South in Savannah, Georgia.

On March 3, he lost to "The Marquee" Bruce Santee at a Division-1 Pro Wrestling event, to Shan Hill in American Combat Wrestling on March 13 and in a Barbed Wire match with Joey Machete against The Heartbreak Express in AWA World 1 South on March 24. On April 6, Madison appeared on another show for AWA World-1 South at the Abraham Baldwin Agricultural College in Tifton, Georgia where he and Alexis Smirnoff Jr. took on The Hillbillies. The event was both to help raise funds for the college's athletic program and the American Cancer Society’s Relay For Life.

On April 10, he wrestled as "Moose Madison" at an ACW show and beat "The G.O.A.T." Dave Mercury. Later that month, he defeated "Mr. 360" Jerrelle Clark at an FIP show on April 29. On May 8, he lost to Shan Hill at an ACW show in a Texas Bullrope match. Madison was managed by Big Bubba Madison. After defeating Jerrelle Clark at an FIP show on May 25, Madison announced he was leaving the YRR. In response, he was attacked Chasyn Rance, Kenny King and Sal Rinauro with Becky Bayless. He teamed with The Heartbreak Express to beat the YRR via disqualification the next night.

On June 4, he made another WWE appearance losing to Chuck Palumbo on WWE Heat and broadcast on Monday Night Raw the next week. On June 7, a tag team match between him and Freedom Ryder against The Sheik and Maximum Capacity ended in a no-contest. The event was hosted by Pro Wrestling Fusion and held at the St. Lucie Country Fairgrounds in Fort Pierce, Florida. He also made his debut appearance in Florida Championship Wrestling losing to René Dupreé on June 26. Returning to FIP, he joined The Heartbreak Express and Seth Delay in a Four-on-Four Melbourne Street Fight to defeat Chasyn Rance, Kenny King, Mad Man Pondo and Ricky Vega on June 29. He defeated Danny Daniels on August 18 and teamed with Black Market to beat The YRR (Chasyn Rance, Kenny King and Jason Blade) with valets Rain & Becky Bayless in an "Anything Goes" Street Fight the next night.

Steve Madison was part of the initial training team of Florida Championship Wrestling when it was moved from Deep South Wrestling in 2007. Madison was tasked with being in charge of teaching the Divas Division for FCW and is credited with the initial training of The Bella Twins, Nicole and Brianna. He also worked hands on with Natalya and Alicia Fox. Madison made several appearances on FCW house shows working as Doink the Clown against “Hacksaw” Jim Duggan, Carlito and Billy Kidman. Steve was responsible for the initial contact between Naofumi Yamamoto and World Wrestling Entertainment/ FCW.

On November 10, 2007, he made a second FCW appearance as "Moose Madison" losing to "The Natural" Nick Nemeth with manager Big Rob. Madison was suspended from Florida Championship Wrestling in late-December, apparently following an argument with Steve Keirn, but was allowed to continue on as a trainer. He took part in New Japan Pro-Wrestling's 35th Anniversary 8-day tour that same month which started on December 2 in Fujisawa, Kanagawa and ended on December 9 in Aichi Prefecture. Madison was released from his WWE contract in mid December 2007 for unknown reasons and went on a hiatus from the professional wrestling scene.

=== Recent years ===
In early 2008, Madison began wrestling for Ultimate Championship Wrestling and quickly captured the promotion's heavyweight title. On June 20, Madison took part in a four-way match against "Sensational" Scott Davis, Freedom Ryder and Buck Quartermaine for the title in Dade City, Florida. Madison was also reportedly in attendance at FCW's debut television taping in South Tampa on July 17. A month later, he returned in Dade City to defend his UCW title.

On September 6, he appeared at the PWF supercard Mass Destruction in Fort Pierce.

Madison currently makes Full Impact Pro his home base in Florida wrestling. Madison also works in several other promotions, and does the booking for the promotion, Elite Wrestling Entertainment that promotes shows every Thursday night out of the historic Cuban Club in Ybor City, Florida. Madison also runs Steve Keirn's "School of Hard Knocks" in Brandon, Florida with Jeff Bradley & Buck Quartermain. An episode of Hogan Knows Best was filmed with Madison and Quartermain teaching Nick Hogan how to wrestle at the school.

As of April 2012, Madison has entered semi-retirement as a professional wrestler and has become a full-time firefighter and paramedic with the city of St. Petersburg, Florida

In 2021, Madison returned to the professional wrestling scene for California-based promotion PCW ULTRA . “The Modern Miracle” made his debut with the promotion in 2018 with a DQ victory over UFC Hall of Famer, Stephan Bonnar. Steve Madison has experienced a career resurgence with victories over JTG and NJPW wrestler, Yuya Uemura.

== Championships and accomplishments ==
- Championship Wrestling from Florida
  - NWA Florida Heavyweight Championship (3 times)
- Independent Professional Wrestling
  - IPW Television Championship (1 time)
- Pro Wrestling Illustrated
  - PWI ranked him #280 of the 500 best singles wrestlers of the PWI 500 in 2005
- Sunray Pro Wrestling
  - SPW Heavyweight Championship (1 time)
