= Slammiversary =

- TNA Slammiversary logo as of 2024
- Promotion: Total Nonstop Action Wrestling
- First event: 2005

Slammiversary is a professional wrestling pay-per-view (PPV) event produced by the American promotion Total Nonstop Action Wrestling. It is one of TNA's “Big Four” PPV events (along with Hard To Kill, Rebellion, and Bound for Glory), and celebrates the anniversary of the promotion's first event that was held on June 19, 2002.

The event had been held in July since 2017; the 2022 event took place on June 19 – twenty years to the day of the promotion's first event.

== History ==
=== King of the Mountain ===
Slammiversary's signature match was the King of the Mountain match, a five-man reverse ladder match which was previously contested for the NWA World Heavyweight Championship and, later, the TNA World Heavyweight Championship. The match debuted on the June 2, 2004, edition of Impact's (then known as NWA:TNA) weekly pay-per-views in Nashville, Tennessee, and was featured at all Slammiversary events up until the 2010 edition. The match made a return in 2015, where the newly announced TNA King of the Mountain Championship was on the line to crown the inaugural champion.

== Events ==
#	Event	Date	City	Venue	Main event	Ref.
–	TNA 1st Anniversary Show	June 18, 2003	Nashville, Tennessee	Nashville Fairgrounds	AJ Styles and Syxx-Pac vs. Jeff Jarrett and Sting	
–	TNA 2nd Anniversary Show	June 23, 2004	Nashville, Tennessee	Nashville Fairgrounds	Jeff Jarrett (c) vs. Ron Killings for the NWA World Heavyweight Championship	
1	Slammiversary (2005)	June 19, 2005	Orlando, Florida	Impact Zone (Universal Studios Florida)	A.J. Styles (c) vs. Abyss vs. Monty Brown vs. Raven vs. Sean Waltman in a King of the Mountain match for the NWA World Heavyweight Championship	
2	Slammiversary (2006)	June 18, 2006	Orlando, Florida	Impact Zone (Universal Studios Florida)	Christian Cage (c) vs. Abyss vs. Jeff Jarrett vs. Ron Killings vs. Sting in a King of the Mountain match for the NWA World Heavyweight Championship	
3	Slammiversary 2007	June 17, 2007	Nashville, Tennessee	Nashville Municipal Auditorium	A.J. Styles vs. Chris Harris vs. Christian Cage vs. Kurt Angle vs. Samoa Joe in a King of the Mountain match for the vacant TNA World Heavyweight Championship	
4	Slammiversary 2008	June 8, 2008	Southaven, Mississippi	DeSoto Civic Center	Samoa Joe (c) vs. Booker T vs. Christian Cage vs. Rhino vs. Robert Roode in a King of the Mountain match for the TNA World Heavyweight Championship with Kevin Nash as special guest enforcer	
5	Slammiversary Seven	June 21, 2009	Auburn Hills, Michigan	The Palace of Auburn Hills	Mick Foley (c) vs. A.J. Styles vs. Jeff Jarrett vs. Kurt Angle vs. Samoa Joe in a King of the Mountain match for the TNA World Heavyweight Championship	
6	Slammiversary VIII	June 13, 2010	Orlando, Florida	Impact Zone (Universal Studios Florida)	Rob Van Dam (c) vs. Sting for the TNA World Heavyweight Championship	
7	Slammiversary IX	June 12, 2011	Orlando, Florida	Impact Zone (Universal Studios Florida)	Jeff Jarrett vs. Kurt Angle to become number one contender to the TNA World Heavyweight Championship and the Olympic gold medal	
8	Slammiversary 10	June 10, 2012	Arlington, Texas	College Park Center	Bobby Roode (c) vs. Sting for the TNA World Heavyweight Championship	
9	Slammiversary XI	June 2, 2013	Boston, Massachusetts	Agganis Arena	Bully Ray (c) vs. Sting in a No Holds Barred match for the TNA World Heavyweight Championship	
10	Slammiversary XII	June 15, 2014	Arlington, Texas	College Park Center	Eric Young (c) vs. Austin Aries vs. Lashley in a three-way steel cage match for the TNA World Heavyweight Championship	
11	Slammiversary 2015	June 28, 2015	Orlando, Florida	Impact Zone (Universal Studios Florida)	Bobby Roode vs. Drew Galloway vs. Eric Young vs. Jeff Jarrett vs. Matt Hardy in a King of the Mountain match for the inaugural TNA King of the Mountain Championship	
12	Slammiversary 2016	June 12, 2016	Orlando, Florida	Impact Zone (Universal Studios Florida)	Drew Galloway (c) vs. Lashley in a Tap Out or Knockout match for the TNA World Heavyweight Championship	
13	Slammiversary XV	July 2, 2017	Orlando, Florida	Impact Zone (Universal Studios Florida)	Lashley (Impact Wrestling World Heavyweight Championship) vs. Alberto El Patrón (GFW Global Championship) in a Title vs. title Winner takes all match	
14	Slammiversary XVI	July 22, 2018	Toronto, Ontario, Canada	The Rebel Complex	Austin Aries (c) vs. Moose for the Impact Wrestling World Heavyweight Championship	
15	Slammiversary XVII	July 7, 2019	Dallas, Texas	Gilley's Dallas	Sami Callihan vs. Tessa Blanchard	
16	Slammiversary 2020	July 18, 2020	Nashville, Tennessee	Skyway Studios	Ace Austin vs. Eddie Edwards vs. Eric Young vs. Rich Swann vs. Trey in a Five-way elimination match for the vacant Impact World Championship	
17	Slammiversary 2021	July 17, 2021	Nashville, Tennessee	Skyway Studios	Kenny Omega (c) vs. Sami Callihan in a no disqualification match for the Impact World Championship	
18	Slammiversary 2022	June 19, 2022	Nashville, Tennessee	Nashville Fairgrounds	Josh Alexander (c) vs. Eric Young for the Impact World Championship	
19	Slammiversary 2023	July 15, 2023	Windsor, Ontario, Canada	St. Clair College	Alex Shelley (c) vs. Nick Aldis for the Impact World Championship	
20	Slammiversary 2024	July 20, 2024	Montreal, Quebec, Canada	Verdun Auditorium	Moose (c) vs. Josh Alexander vs. Steve Maclin vs. Nic Nemeth vs. Frankie Kazarian vs. Joe Hendry in a Six-way elimination match for the TNA World Championship	
21	Slammiversary 2025	July 20, 2025	Elmont, New York	UBS Arena	Trick Williams (c) vs. Mike Santana vs. Joe Hendry in a Three-way match for the TNA World Championship	
22	Slammiversary 2026	June 28, 2026	Boston, Massachusetts	Agganis Arena	Mike Santana (c) vs. Nic Nemeth for the TNA World Championship	
(c) – refers to the champion(s) heading into the match
