= Tekno Team 2000 =

Professional wrestling tag team

Tag team
- Members: Travis; Troy
- Name: Tekno Team 2000
- Billed heights: Troy: 6 ft 6 in (1.98 m); Travis: 6 ft 4 in (1.93 m)
- Debut: 1994
- Disbanded: Summer 1996
- Years active: 1994–1996, 2001

Tekno Team 2000 was a professional wrestling tag team who competed in the World Wrestling Federation (WWF) from 1995 to 1996, composed of Travis and Troy (son of WWF writer Bill Watts). They started off with strong hype, but did not deliver on it, faltering after winning a few early matches. They were sent to the WWF's farm territory, United States Wrestling Association (USWA), for practice. After returning, they continued to lose matches and were soon released.

== History ==
Originally, Chad Fortune and Erik Watts were football teammates for the University of Louisville. In 1994, they reunited and began wrestling as a tag team. They debuted in Minnesota for the AWA, losing to Wayne Bloom and Mike Enos.

=== World Wrestling Federation ===
Wearing "futuristic" silver and maroon ring outfits, they debuted in the WWF as a babyface tag team who was "ahead of its time". As part of the "New Generation" of the WWF, they were said to be "determined to bring the New Generation into the 21st Century". Building on their youthful appearance, Troy and Travis were featured in pin-up pictures in the World Wrestling Federation Magazine.

Tekno Team 2000 made their WWF debut during a house show at Madison Square Garden on March 19, 1995. They defeated The Heavenly Bodies (Tom Prichard and Jimmy Del Ray) and repeated the result the following night at Boston Garden. Their WWF television debut took place on the May 27, 1995 episode of WWF Superstars; they defeated Barry Horowitz and the Brooklyn Brawler. They were booked to appear in a series of matches against The Heavenly Bodies. Del Ray was not able to appear in several of the matches, so he was replaced by Mantaur and Barry Horowitz in several of the matches. Tekno Team 2000 won all of the matches in this series. The WWF teased a storyline in which Tekno Team 2000 was being scouted by Ted DiBiase to join the Million Dollar Corporation, but they did not join the group. Their success led Pro Wrestling Illustrated to rank them among the top ten tag teams in the world.

On July 2, Troy and Travis served as lumberjacks in the lumberjack match between Diesel and Sid at In Your House 2: The Lumberjacks. During the match, Sid attacked Troy and Travis. While he was distracted, other wrestlers attacked Sid and helped Diesel to win the match.

=== USWA ===
Watts has stated that the WWF intended to have Tekno Team 2000 win the WWF Tag Team Championship after two months in the promotion. After Watts' father, Bill Watts, began booking matches, the team was later sent to developmental territories to improve their skills. They returned to USWA in Tennessee, where they had wrestled a tag team match together in April 1995 under their real names. Competing as Tekno Team 2000, they defeated PG-13 on September 18. They began losing matches, however, while facing PG-13, The Heavenly Bodies, and The Bushwhackers. On October 30, Troy and Travis reversed their fortunes and defeated King Cobra and Spellbinder.

=== Return to World Wrestling Federation ===
In 1996, Troy and Travis resumed competition in the WWF with black muscle shirts and silver face paint. They lost to The Bodydonnas on the May 6 episode of Monday Night Raw. During Tekno Team 2000's return, however, the WWF instructed The Bodydonnas to help make Troy and Travis look good to the fans. Five days later, Tekno Team 2000 lost to The Smoking Gunns on WWF Superstars. Their final appearance came in a loss to The Godwinns on the June 3 episode of Monday Night Raw. Watts and Fortune were released from their WWF contracts in the summer of 1996.

=== Aftermath ===
After disbanding, Watts took a hiatus from wrestling for two years. He returned to WCW in 1998 until 1999. Fortune went to World Championship Wrestling and worked there from 1997 to 1999. They later formed a team while wrestling in Japan. In 2001, they reunited in Dusty Rhodes' Turnbuckle Championship Wrestling, teaming together under their real names. Watts later found work with Extreme Championship Wrestling and Total Nonstop Action Wrestling, and Fortune retired from wrestling to drive monster trucks. Tekno Team 2000 was included during a video montage of poor gimmicks during the tenth anniversary of Monday Night Raw in January 2003.
