= Vanessa Harding =

American professional wrestler and manager

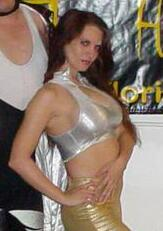
- Vanessa Harding (2013)

Personal information
- Born: Leslie Culton; October 11, 1970 (age 55) Atlanta, Georgia, United States

Professional wrestling career
- Ring name(s): Vanessa Harding; Ms. Blue; Ms. Blu; Ring Girl; The American Hard Body
- Billed height: 5 ft 8 in (1.73 m)
- Billed weight: 128 lb (58 kg)
- Billed from: Everyone's Imagination; Zephyr Hills, Florida; St. Petersburg, Florida; Atlanta, Georgia
- Trained by: Dory Funk Jr. Black Knight; Robbie Chance
- Debut: 2002

Leslie Culton (born October 11, 1970) better known by her ring name Vanessa Harding, is a semi-retired American professional wrestler and manager who has competed in North American independent promotions throughout the early 2000s including Full Impact Pro, Future of Wrestling, the Heartland Wrestling Association, Ohio Valley Wrestling and NWA Florida. She has also had short stints in Ring of Honor, World League Wrestling and Women's Extreme Wrestling. She is also known as Elle Cee, where she has appeared in several adult films, such as on the bangbus.com website.

== Professional wrestling career ==
=== Training ===
Born in Atlanta, Georgia, Harding frequently moved around up until adulthood. While living in Zephyr Hills, Florida, she became interested in professional wrestling after seeing Dusty Rhodes on Championship Wrestling from Florida. However, it was after she began regularly watching wrestling with an ex-boyfriend that she began to consider a career in professional wrestling. Hardy received much of her initial training from independent wrestlers Black Knight and Robbie Chance, however she also received training from others on the independent circuit including Mikey from the Spirit Squad in Ohio Valley Wrestling, Mana of the Samoan Island Tribe, Navy Seal, Pat Powers, Al Hardeman, Virgil and Dory Funk, Jr., among others. Harding later attended the IWA wrestling school.

=== 2003–2005 ===
She moved to St Petersburg, Florida and began managing wrestlers in Southeastern promotions. Harding began to build a solid reputation as a heel manager frequently using typical outside interference such as holding a leg down or more direct attacks including using the ring ropes to choke another wrestler, kicking him while outside the ring or using an eye gouge or neckbreaker. Among those she managed included Robbie Chance and The Heartbreak Express in Full Impact Pro. She also managed The Nighthawk in Southern Championship Wrestling and the National Wrestling Alliance.

Later, as a wrestler, she also faced Luna Vachon on September 25, 2003. In October, Harding appeared in IPW Hardcore where she managed Mideon in his feud with Antonio Banks, and later Danny Doring, for almost a year before leaving to continue training. The following year, Harding managed Lexie Fyfe in her feud against Malia Hosaka and appeared on several PPV events for Woman's Extreme Wrestling. She also worked for Major League Wrestling as "Ring Girl".

In mid-2004, Harding took part in the first-ever professional wrestling national tour of the People's Republic of China. Organized by NWA Mid-Atlantic Championship Wrestling, the tour began with its inaugural show, The Brawl at the Wall, held in Beijing near the Great Wall of China. Between August 15 to September 10, The Great Brawl of China tour visited Beijing, Shanghai, Nanjing, Shenzhen, Hong Kong and Guangzhou. Wrestlers who appeared on the 4-week tour included former NWA World Heavyweight Champion Barry Windham, Dustin Rhodes, The Barbarian, Glacier as well as NWA MACW Junior Heavyweight Champion Rikki Nelson, Chris Hamrick, Andrue Bane and Bruiser Bradley. Female wrestlers, the first to compete in China, included Malia Hosaka, Brandy Wine, Jenny Taylor and Amber Holly. Harding and SoCal Val also made their NWA MACW debuts on the tour. In September 2004, Harding was introduced as Ms. Blue (or Ms. Blu) in Ohio Valley Wrestling (OVW) as the newest member of manager Kenny Bolin's stable Bolin Services in September 2004. Later that year, in Georgia Championship Wrestling, she would also make a failed attempt to defeat GCW Women's International Champion Christie Ricci on November 27, 2004.

On February 25, 2005, Harding made a one-time appearance for Ring of Honor in Dayton, Ohio as a valet and manager for Jimmy Rave and The Embassy. Later, she interfered in a match between Rave and A.J. Styles causing Styles to be pinned after Harding sprayed bug spray into his eyes. Feuding with Lady Victoria in the World Wrestling Alliance in late February, Harding defeated Syren by disqualification at an event for Hoosier Pro Wrestling on March 5, and in a tag team match with Fantasia, lost to Team Blondage (Krissy Vaine and Amber O'Neal) at a show for Carolina Championship Wrestling in Lenoir, North Carolina a week later. After a near 15 minute match, Fantasia was pinned by O'Neal while Vaine helped hold her down. Returning to Hoosier Pro Wrestling, she would defeat Lady Victoria in a singles match and later in a mixed tag team match teaming with Beech to defeat Lady Victoria & Robbie Chance on April 2. In one of her last appearances on OVW television on June 4, Harding fought to a no contest with Alexis Laree after Laree and Mike Mondo became involved in an altercation in which she slapped Mondo after he had kissed her. At the Independent Association of Wrestling supercard Clash at the Cove, Harding lost to Jacqueline in a three-way match with Krystal Carmichael for the IAW Championship at Coveleski Stadium in South Bend, Indiana on June 25. Harding left OVW in August planning to take a year off from competition. On September 2, Harding appeared at the 2005 Dragon*Con against Lexie Faye at the Hyatt Regency Atlanta Hotel. The following night, Harding was eliminated by Lady Victoria in a three-way dance with Lexie Fyfe.

=== 2006–2008 ===
In January 2006, Harding began touring Italy appearing with Nu-Wrestling Evolution losing to Nikita on January 29, 2006. On March 25, 2007, Harding faced Hellena Heavenly at the Heartbreakers supercard. In August 2008, Harding made an appearance for Lady Victoria's Ringin' Wet & Wild show at the annual Sturgis Motorcycle Rally. Held at the Buffalo Chip Campground, Harding faced Christie Ricci, Sybil Starr and Lady Victoria in matches held at several locations at the campground and amphitheater.

== Championships and accomplishments ==
- Funking Conservatory

- FC Women's Championship (1 time)

- Total Wrestling Magazine

- TWM ranked her #41 in the Top 50 Independent Women Wrestlers in 2005
