= TCW Heavyweight Championship =

Professional wrestling championship

Details
- Promotion: Turnbuckle Championship Wrestling
- Date established: July 6, 2000
- Date retired: September 14, 2002
Statistics
- First champion: Glacier
- Final champion: Glacier
- Most reigns: Scotty Anton (3 reigns)

The TCW Heavyweight Championship was the primary professional wrestling singles title of Turnbuckle Championship Wrestling. It was originally won by Glacier who defeated Jorge Estrada in tournament final held in Ashburn, Georgia on July 6, 2000. It was defended primarily in the state of Georgia but throughout the Southern United States, most often in Dothan, Alabama, until the promotion's close in 2003.

== Title history ==
Wrestlers:	Times:	Date:	Location:	Notes:
Glacier	1	July 6, 2000	Ashburn, Georgia	Defeated Jorge Estrada in tournament final to become the first champion.
Barry Windham	1	October 28, 2000	Warner Robins, Georgia	
Scotty Anton	1	June 2, 2001	Dothan, Alabama	the match ended with Daffney counting the pinfall and Anton left with the title.
Barry Windham	2	June 7, 2001	Milledgeville, Georgia	Title is returned to Windham due to the controversial finish.
Scotty Anton	2	September 15, 2001	Carrollton, Georgia	
Dustin Rhodes	1	January 26, 2002	Carrollton, Georgia	
Scotty Anton	3	March 1, 2002	Carrollton, Georgia	
Title is vacated when Scotty Riggs forfeits the championship after suffering an elbow injury.
Glacier	2	September 14, 2002	Carrollton, Georgia	Defeated Damien to win the vacant title.
