= Ron Reis =

American professional wrestler (born 1970)

Personal information
- Born: Ronald Allen Reis; April 26, 1970 (age 56) San Jose, California, U.S.
- Education: Santa Clara University

Professional wrestling career
- Ring name(s): Big Bomb Jones; Big Ron Studd; Evil; Reese; Ron Reis; The Super Giant Ninja; SWAT; Vanilla Gorilla; The Yeti
- Billed height: 7 ft 2 in (218 cm)
- Billed weight: 365 lb (166 kg)
- Trained by: Big John Studd
- Debut: March 12, 1994
- Retired: 2005

Ronald Allen Reis (born April 26, 1970) is an American professional wrestler. He is best known for his appearances with World Championship Wrestling between 1995 and 1998 under the ring names The Yeti and Reese.

== Early life ==
Ron Reis is the son of Ron Reis, Sr., who was a member of National Collegiate Athletic Association title-winning basketball teams in 1961 and 1962 while studying at the University of Cincinnati.

Reis attended Monta Vista High School in Cupertino, California. He played on the school's basketball team, scoring 2,082 points and competing in the 1987 Central Coast Section championship. Reis went on to attend Santa Clara University, where he played basketball for four years. He played in 116 career games and averaged 10.7 points, 7.4 rebounds, and 1.4 assists per game. He led the West Coast Conference in total rebounds (320) and rebounds per game (11.0) during the 1990–91 season. He was named to the All-WCC team in 1990–91 and 1991–92. He has the highest career field goal percentage (.606) in school history and is fifth in career rebounds (851).

== Professional wrestling career ==
=== Early career (1994–1995) ===
Ron Reis was trained by Big John Studd, with whom he was tagged as the "Giants of Wrestling." He made his professional debut on March 12, 1994, for the New England–based International Wrestling Federation under his birth name. In 1995, Reis began performing for the Las Vegas–based National Wrestling Conference as "SWAT".

=== World Championship Wrestling (1995–1996, 1998) ===
Reis debuted in World Championship Wrestling on Monday Nitro on October 23, 1995, as The Yeti – the Dungeon of Doom's so-called "insurance policy" for the upcoming WCW World Heavyweight Championship match between Dungeon member The Giant and current champion Hulk Hogan at Halloween Havoc 1995. Initially introduced (supposedly) frozen inside a block of ice, the Yeti soon broke out of the ice to reveal a heavily bandaged appearance reminiscent of a huge mummy and went on to interfere in the Halloween Havoc 1995 main event, where he and The Giant attacked Hulk Hogan with a double-bearhug. Reis wore lifts in his boots at the event and had bandages wrapped high on his head, which gave the effect of The Yeti appearing noticeably taller than The Giant (in reality Reis is only around an inch taller than Wight) and caused an astonished Tony Schiavone to remark "The Yeti is taller than The Giant!".

Following Halloween Havoc, The Yeti's ring attire was changed without explanation to resemble a masked ninja. However, Reis only made three more appearances as the character; as an entrant in the 60-man battle royal at World War 3 1995, in a match against Barry Houston on WCW Prime, and in a match against WCW United States Heavyweight Champion One Man Gang on WCW Saturday Night in January 1996, where the character was renamed The Super Giant Ninja. This would be the final appearance of the character.

Reis later became known as Big Ron Studd in 1996, and WCW announcers billed Reis as having taken the surname of his trainer Big John Studd. In his column in WCW Magazine, Bobby Heenan, who had managed John Studd, expressed disdain over this angle. WCW primarily used the Studd character as an enhancement talent. He would lose to Chris Benoit, Randy Savage, Lex Luger and Jeff Jarrett.

He left WCW by the end of 1996, and in 1997 worked in the independent circuit.

On the March 2, 1998, edition of Nitro, Reis returned to WCW and joined Raven's Flock as Reese. Raven claimed that Reis' size had made him an outcast from society, leading him to seek acceptance within the Flock. Reis acted as Raven's enforcer, though he was unable to prevent Goldberg defeating Raven for the WCW United States Heavyweight Championship. He also suffered a loss to Juventud Guerrera at the 1998 Great American Bash. Reese's last appearance was on the June 29, 1998, episode of Nitro. Saturn pinned Reese with a Death Valley Driver.

=== Later career (2000–2005) ===
After being released, Reis toured Japan as Big Bomb Jones (a take on Big Van Vader) in 2000. That same year, he wrestled for NWA Wildside in Georgia. In 2001, he began working for Dusty Rhodes' Turnbuckle Championship Wrestling promotion, returning to the Big Ron Studd gimmick. He formed a tag team with Glacier, and they won the TCW Tag Team Championships on January 3, 2004. The titles were vacated later that year.

Reis reemerged in Vince Russo's Christian-oriented Ring Of Glory Wrestling promotion in 2005 as the abstract character Evil, losing to Joshua the Carpenter on February 26.

== Filmography ==
- Assault on Death Mountain a.k.a. Shadow Warriors II: Hunt for the Death Merchant (1999) as "Vlassi"

== Championships and accomplishments ==
- Turnbuckle Championship Wrestling
  - TCW Tag Team Championship (1 time) – with Glacier
