= Damian Steele =

American professional wrestler (1975 – 2009)

Personal information
- Born: Damien Dothard; 1975 Trenton, New Jersey
- Died: July 22, 2009 (age 33 or 34) Smyrna, Georgia

Professional wrestling career
- Ring name(s): Damian Steele; Damien Steele; Damian Dynamite
- Billed height: 6 ft 0 in (1.83 m)
- Billed weight: 225 lb (102 kg)
- Debut: 2004
- Retired: 2008

Damien Dothard (1975 – July 22, 2009) was an American professional wrestler, better known by his ring name Damian Steele.

Steele competed mainly in North American independent promotions, including Georgia Championship Wrestling. He later signed a developmental contract with World Wrestling Entertainment and was assigned to their developmental territory, Deep South Wrestling (DSW). While in DSW, he competed as one half of the tag team Ebony and Ivory with Ray Gordy.

== Career ==
=== Georgia Championship Wrestling (2004-2005) ===
Making his professional debut in 2004, Damian Steele teamed with AJ Steele in one of his earliest matches in the promotion to challenge GCW Tag Team Champions Sonny Siaki and David Young on October 14, 2004. The following month, he was selected by AJ Steele as his new partner after he and Bull Buchanan, then reigning GCW Tag Team Champions, had split up. Steele had beaten Buchanan in a singles match to win that right. The two successfully defended the tag team titles against Sonny Siaki & David Young and Bull Buchanan and The Grappler before losing the belts to Elix Skipper and John Bogie in Columbus, Georgia on December 25, 2004.

They briefly regained the titles from Glenn Gilbertti and Johnny Swinger on February 12, 2005 before losing to Sonny Siaki and The Wrestler a little over two weeks later. On May 6, Steele lost to Jason Cross in a three-way match with Tony Mamaluke. He also lost to Glen Gilbertti in a four-way match with Jason Cross and Tony Mamaluke for the GCW Television Championship on May 21. At GCW's 1st Anniversary Show a week later, Damian Steele participated in a War Games cage match as part of Dusty Rhodes' team which included Jason Cross, Sonny Siaki and A.J. Steele. After defeating their opponents David Young, The Wrestler, Chris Stevens and Greg Brown, Dusty Rhodes defeated Tully Blanchard in the cage with Ronnie Garvin as special guest referee.

On June 4, Steele and Glenn Gilberti wrestled to a time limit draw in a match for the GCW Television Championship. Due to a contract loophole however, Steele was awarded the title. Defeating Elix Skipper weeks later on June 18, he officially unified the GCW Television and US Junior Heavyweight titles. Feuding with Jason Cross over the title, he fought Cross to a 15-minute time limit draw at GCW's Never Say Never held at the GCW Arena on July 2 and defeated Jason Cross and Glen Gilbertti in a three-way match a week later. He finally lost the title to Jason Cross on July 23. He also lost to Elix Skipper on August 6 and, at The Point of No Return, he lost to GCW Television Champion Glen Gilbertti in a no time limit match. Later that month, Steele lost to John Bogie & Lee Thomas in a tag team match with Cassidy Riley in an "Australian Rules" tag team match on August 20. He and Riley faced each other in a singles match the following month. Steele, while arguing with the referee, was pinned by Riley. Steele would wrestle his last match defeating Lee Thomas on October 15, 2005.

=== World Wrestling Entertainment ===
==== Deep South Wrestling (2005-2006) ====
Steele was transferred to Deep South Wrestling in the fall of 2005. He was less than successful in the singles division losing matches to Johnny Slaughter, Johnny Parisi, Lash LeRoux, Todd Shane and The Freakin' Deacon. In December, he also teamed with Justin Sane and Ryan Reeves in tag team matches against The Regulators.

He scored his first major victory in the promotion defeating "Uptown" Frankie Capone on January 19, 2006. That same month, he began teaming with Ray Gordy as "Ebony and Ivory" and quickly became a formidable tag team in the promotion facing both The Slaughter Boys and The Gymini during their first weeks as a team. On February 9, they teamed with Bill DeMott to defeat Simon Dean and The Gymini in a 6-man tag team match. They also teamed with Scott Fantastic against Frankie Piazzo and The Slaughter Boys on March 9.

Defeating Frankie Ciasta in a singles match on March 16, he and Gordy defeated Ciasta and his partner Mikal Adryan in a dark match a week later. At that same event, they were defeated by the Blue Bloods (William Regal and David Taylor) in a championship tournament for the DSW Tag Team Championship. On April 13, Steele lost to Palmer Canon in a singles match with Matt Striker as the special guest referee. During the match, The Great Khali interfered knocking out Steele with a headbutt. Ebony and Ivory also faced Sonny Siaki and Jay Bradley and Montel Vontavious Porter and Eric Perez that same month.

On May 4, Steele defeated Francisco Ciatso in a dark match and defeated he and Cru Jones in a tag team match with T-Ray a week later. On June 6, he and Gordy defeated Matt Striker and Cru Jones. They also faced The Great Khali several days later losing to him in a handicap match. The following night at Six Flags, Steele lost to Eric Perez. Steele began wrestling in single matches later that month against Matt Striker, Francisco Ciatso and Derek Niekirk.

On July 13, Ebony and Ivory lost a four-way match to Urban Assault (Eric Perez and Sonny Siaki). The match, which included Team Elite (Tony Salantri and Mike Taylor) and The Major Brothers (Brett and Brian), was to decide the number one contenders to the DSW Tag Team Championship. Defeating Bradley Jay and Chris Rombola a week later, Steele also faced Montel Vontavious Porter, Bradley Jay and Big Bully Douglas in single matches for the next few weeks. On August 31, he and Gordy lost to Bradley Jay and Magnus Maximus in a dark match at a DSW television taping.

Three days later, he and Gordy made their first World Wrestling Entertainment appearance facing The Pitbulls (Jamie Noble and Kid Kash) at the September 2 edition of SmackDown!. On September 7, they lost to Derrick Neikirk and Danny Gimondo in another dark match on DSW television. Steele also faced Dan Rodimer in the opening match at Six Flags Over Georgia held at the Axis Arena in Austell, Georgia two days later.

=== Later career (2007-2009) ===
Steele remained with Georgia Championship Wrestling after the promotion ended its business relationship with World Wrestling Entertainment. He made his official return on April 17, 2007 when he defeated Randall Johnson with a Northern Lights Suplex in Phenix City, Alabama. At GCW's fourth annual War Games show at the Great Skate Plex on April 24, Steele lost to The Bruiser when he was pinned after receiving a high kick to the head. AJ Steele had originally been scheduled to appear at the event, but was replaced by Damian Steele when his former partner left for the Independent Wrestling Network.

== Personal life and death ==
Dothard had an on and off relationship with Julie Patterson for nine years. He had two sons. Prior to his death he had been working as a personal trainer.

Dothard died in his sleep on July 22, 2009 at his home in Smyrna, Georgia. The cause of death was later determined as a brain aneurysm.

== Championships and accomplishments ==
- Georgia Championship Wrestling
  - GCW United States Junior Heavyweight Championship (1 time)
  - GCW Television Championship (2 times)
  - GCW Tag Team Championship (1 time) - with AJ Steele
