= Sonny Siaki =

American wrestler (born 1974)

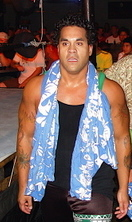
- Siaki in 2007

Personal information
- Born: July 23, 1974 (age 52) Pago Pago, American Samoa
- Education: East Carolina University

Professional wrestling career
- Ring name(s): Cocky Siaki; Hawaiian GQ; Money; Sonny Siaki
- Billed height: 6 ft 1 in (185 cm)
- Billed weight: 242 lb (110 kg)
- Billed from: Pago Pago, American Samoa
- Trained by: Paul Orndorff; WCW Power Plant; Dusty Rhodes
- Debut: March 1998
- Retired: January 9, 2009

Sonny Siaki (born July 23, 1974) is an American retired professional wrestler of American Samoan descent. He is best known for his time in NWA Total Nonstop Action, where he was a one-time TNA X Division Champion.

== Early life ==
When Siaki was three, his family moved to Hawaii, then California in the United States of America before settling in Wilmington, North Carolina. Siaki graduated from New Hanover High School, received a football scholarship to play at East Carolina University, and majored in Physical Education. He played inside linebacker until a serious stinger injury forced him to stop playing football, preventing him from pursuing a professional football career.

== Professional wrestling career ==
=== Early career (1998–2002) ===
After his school friend Brad Cain known as Lodi notified Siaki that the WCW Power Plant was holding tryouts in early 1999, Siaki attended the tryout and was awarded a WCW developmental contract. He graduated after seven months and wrestled his first televised match on WCW Saturday Night against Allan Funk. Siaki largely appeared on Saturday Night and faced other Power Plant graduates, though he did make several appearances on Thunder and Nitro. Siaki eventually left WCW in March 2000, unhappy with the way he was being utilized.

Siaki moved on to the Urban Wrestling Alliance in California, where he was known as "Money". After nine months, the UWA folded and Siaki joined Turnbuckle Championship Wrestling in March 2001 where he received further training from the TCW owner, Dusty Rhodes.

=== NWA Total Nonstop Action (2002–2005) ===
On June 19, 2002, Siaki debuted on the first event of the National Wrestling Alliance-Total Nonstop Action as one-third of The Flying Elvises with Jimmy Yang and Jorge Estrada. The Elvises were a comedy heel stable who impersonated Elvis Presley. After the team disbanded, Siaki joined Vince Russo's Sports Entertainment Xtreme, a faction that tried to take over TNA (kayfabe). There he was then given a valet, Desire, a fellow TCW graduate, and earned the nickname "The Ace in the Hole". He won his first and only title in the promotion on December 11, 2002, when he defeated Jerry Lynn to win the TNA X Division Championship. He held the belt until February 12, 2003 when he lost to Kid Kash. In July 2003, Siaki began a feud with D'Lo Brown, who he defeated in a casket match. In October 2003, he formed a tag team with Ekmo, which split when Ekmo began working for All Japan Pro Wrestling.

In April 2004 he and Simon Diamond began feuding with Glenn Gilberti and Johnny Swinger. After Siaki and Diamond were victorious in a tag match, their opponents were forced to wear Irish and Samoan native dress respectively, punishing Gilberti and Swinger for the ethnic jokes they had made in the preceding weeks. Siaki formed a tag team with Apolo, having his most notable match at Lockdown, where they faced Lance Hoyt and Chris Candido in a steel cage tag match. During the match, Candido broke his leg and died four days after due to a blood clot. In December 2005, Siaki's contract with TNA expired, and he declined to re-sign, instead leaving the promotion on good terms.

=== World Wrestling Entertainment (2005–2007) ===
In late December 2005, Siaki signed a contract with World Wrestling Entertainment. He debuted in the WWE developmental territory Deep South Wrestling on February 2, 2006, suffering a minor injury in the process. On February 23, 2006, Sonny returned to Deep South Wrestling as a heel having a match with Damian Steele. Going by the moniker "Cocky Siaki", he and Eric Perez (as Urban Assault) would win the Deep South Tag Team Titles on November 30, 2006. He then began teaming up with Afa Anoa'i, Jr. Both Siaki and former partner Eric Perez were working Raw house shows in March but Siaki suffered a back injury during that tour which left him out of action for one month. Siaki continued to tag with Afa Jr. in Deep South until it closed in April 2007. Siaki then re-debuted with Afa, as The Samoan Fight Club, in the new development territory, under the World Wrestling Entertainment (WWE) name, Florida Championship Wrestling. On September 15, 2007, it was reported that Siaki had been released from his developmental contract. Three days after the release, Siaki issued a statement saying that he has had some "personal issues" at home and that his focus was on his family right now, not wrestling.

=== Late career (2007–2009) ===
After leaving WWE, Siaki returned to the independent circuit. On September 17, 2008, Siaki announced his intention to retire from professional wrestling because he planned to donate one of his kidneys to his brother. Siaki would only have one kidney remaining, and thus the doctor told him he could not wrestle anymore, effectively ending his ten-year career. He wrestled his final match on January 9, 2009.

== Personal life ==
He currently resides in Atlanta, Georgia and has a daughter. After retiring from professional wrestling Siaki began working for UPS.

Siaki appeared on an episode of Family Feud with his family.

== Championships and accomplishments ==
- Deep South Wrestling
  - Deep South Tag Team Championship (1 time) – with Eric Perez
- Great Championship Wrestling
  - GCW Heavyweight Championship (1 time)
  - GCW Interstate Championship (1 time)
  - GCW Tag Team Championship (2 times) – with David Young and The Wrestler
- NWA Wrestle Birmingham
  - NWA Wrestle Birmingham Tag Team Championship (1 time) – with Elix Skipper
- NWA Total Nonstop Action
  - TNA X Division Championship (1 time)
- Turnbuckle Championship Wrestling
  - TCW Tag Team Championship (1 time) – with Jorge Estrada
