= Chad Fortune =

American professional wrestler, football player (born 1967)

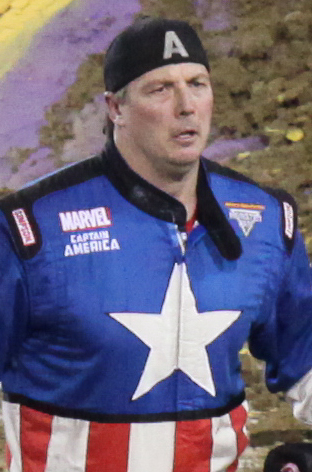
- Fortune in 2014

Personal information
- Full name: Chad Adrianne Fortune
- Nationality: American
- Born: August 13, 1967 (age 59) Roswell, Georgia, U.S.
- Education: Louisville
- Occupation: Monster truck driver
- Years active: 1986–1992 (football); 1994–2000 (wrestling); 2000–2019 (Monster Jam)
- Football career

No. 81
- Position: Tight end

Career information
- High school: Valparaiso High School
- College: Louisville (1986–1989)
- NFL draft: 1990: undrafted

Career history
- Indianapolis Colts (1990)*; Miami Dolphins (1990)*; Philadelphia Eagles (1991)*; Frankfurt Galaxy (1991–1992); Washington Redskins (1992)*; Dallas Cowboys (1992)*; Chicago Bears (1992)
- * Offseason or practice squad member only

Sport
- Country: United States
- Sport: Monster Jam
- Team: Soldier Fortune
- Retired: 2019
- Professional wrestling career
- Ring name(s): Chad Fortune; Travis
- Billed height: 6 ft 5 in (1.96 m)
- Billed weight: 240 lb (110 kg)
- Trained by: WCW Power Plant
- Debut: 1994
- Retired: 2000

Chad Adrianne Fortune (born August 13, 1967) is an American former monster truck driver, football tight end and professional wrestler in both the World Wrestling Federation (WWF) and World Championship Wrestling (WCW).

== Football career ==
Fortune played tight end at the University of Louisville from 1986 to 1989. In 1987, he appeared in 11 games and recorded 16 receptions for 204 yards and one touchdown. In 1988, he appeared in 11 games and recorded 35 receptions for 339 yards and four touchdowns. In 1989, he appeared in 11 games and recorded 30 receptions for 353 yards. He was a 1989 first team All-South Independent, 1988 Second team All-South Independent

Following his college career he signed an undrafted free agent contract with the Indianapolis Colts but was released prior to the start of the 1990 season. Fortune spent time on the practice squad of both the Miami Dolphins and Colts during the 1990 season. He competed in the Philadelphia Eagles 1991 training camp, but the team released him to clear a roster spot for Kenny Jackson.

Fortune was signed at various points of 1992 preseason, with the Washington Redskins, Dallas Cowboys, and Chicago Bears. He was on the Bears practice squad at the start of the 1992 season, missing some time due to an allergic reaction caused by a bee sting. He was promoted to the main roster, and spent part of the 1992 season as the team's third string tight end.

Fortune was also a starting tight end for the Frankfurt Galaxy during both their 1991 and 1992 seasons.

== Professional wrestling ==
=== World Wrestling Federation (1995-1996) ===
Fortune joined the World Wrestling Federation (WWF) under the ring name Travis and teamed with college teammate Erik Watts (as Troy) as Tekno Team 2000. Wearing silver smocks and tight zubaz, their gimmick was that they represented the cutting edge of cyberculture. Their tag team made its debut on the May 27, 1995 episode of Superstars in a victorious effort against Brooklyn Brawler and Barry Horowitz. They wrestled two more matches on television the following month before disappearing from television until July 1995 for the In Your House pay-per-view acting as lumberjacks for the main event. After the pay-per-view they disappeared off of television for a year being sent to United States Wrestling Association (USWA), only to resurface back on WWF television in 1996. They got a WWF Tag Team title shot against The Bodydonnas.

=== World Championship Wrestling (1997-1999) ===
Fortune signed a World Championship Wrestling (WCW) contract in 1997. He wrestled mainly on the taped shows such as WCW Saturday Night and WCW Worldwide. He made his WCW debut on the June 24 episode of WCW Saturday Night in a loss to Joey Maggs. Fortune is also known as the first wrestler to defeat Bill Goldberg in a singles match on July 24, 1997, albeit in a dark match on Saturday Night before Goldberg's television debut. He and Dale Torborg were briefly a tag team known as "The Pit Crew". He would barely perform throughout 1998, returning in early 1999 before again being taken off TV. His last WCW match would come on July 8, 1999, in a loss to The Barbarian. Fortune was one of many wrestlers released by WCW in October 1999.

== Monster trucks ==
In 2000, SFX Entertainment (recently Live Nation, now Feld Entertainment) signed a contract with World Championship Wrestling to bring WCW-based trucks to their USHRA Monster Jam series, which gave Fortune, through wrestling, his start in monster trucks. He was initially an unnamed "spokesman" for the nWo truck, who would give antagonistic interviews while the driver, Rob Knell, acted as being focused on the truck. Many in the industry were vocal against the use of professional wrestling gimmicks for drivers, and the truck only lasted one season.

The following year, Fortune began driving the WCW Nitro Machine truck in the winter season, then bounced around trucks during the summer. He gave Karl Malone a ride in the WCW Nitro truck and the two became friends. In 2002, Malone signed a deal with SFX/Clear Channel to create a truck called Power Forward. Fortune was chosen as the driver and drove the truck for three years, reaching the World Finals in 2002 and 2003.

In 2005, Fortune brought to the table the idea of the Superman truck. The company created the new truck. Based on his professional wrestling background, he decided to dye his hair black and alter his look to match the character of Superman. He was successful in the Superman truck, and made the final rounds of several stadium events. He was then given the "Most Improved Driver" award for 2005.

In 2012, 2013 and 2014 Monster Jam Seasons, Fortune drove the new Captain America truck, one of the two Marvel Comics themed trucks coming back onto the circuit along with Alex Blackwell who was to drive Wolverine. In the 2015 season, Fortune initiated the idea of the "Soldier Fortune" truck honoring the United States Armed Forces. As of 2024, the truck is still running, with a different driver named Kayla Blood (since she served as the Louisiana National Guard).

In 2019, Fortune announced his retirement from Monster Jam.

== See also ==
- List of gridiron football players who became professional wrestlers
