= Jorge Estrada =

American professional wrestler

Personal information
- Born: Jorge Moraza Miami, Florida, U.S.

Professional wrestling career
- Ring name(s): Estrada; Hexxy; Jorge Estrada
- Billed height: 5 ft 9 in (175 cm)
- Billed weight: 205 lb (93 kg)
- Billed from: Memphis, Tennessee
- Trained by: Dusty Rhodes
- Debut: 1999
- Retired: 2003

Jorge Moraza is an American professional wrestler, better known by the ring name Jorge Estrada. He is a former National Wrestling Alliance North American Heavyweight champion and participated in the first televised match of NWA Total Nonstop Action.

== Professional wrestling career ==
Moraza was trained by Dusty Rhodes and debuted in 1999 as "Jorge Estrada". He wrestled in Georgia's NWA Wildside as well as Rhodes's Turnbuckle Championship Wrestling, winning the TCW Tag Team Championship with Glacier (Ray Lloyd). Estrada also wrestled for Extreme Championship Wrestling during 2000, including a match against Simon Diamond and Johnny Swinger in their first appearance as a team.

Estrada's biggest exposure came in the early days of the Total Nonstop Action (TNA) wrestling promotion. From the first TNA event in June 2002, he wrestled with the gimmick of an Elvis impersonator as part of The Flying Elvises trio until that group disbanded in October.

Estrada continued to wear the Elvis jumpsuit as a solo wrestler, and took a valet named Priscilla. During this time, he won the NWA North American Championship from Paul Atlas at the National Wrestling Alliance 54th Anniversary Show on October 26 in Texas. His status as champion was never mentioned on TNA programming, even though TNA was the flagship promotion of the NWA at the time and the North American Championship was ostensibly the second-highest in status behind the World Heavyweight Championship. Estrada never appeared on-camera with the belt, as TNA's agreement with NWA only extended to the World Heavyweight and Tag Team championships.

Instead, Estrada was booked as an underdog face against the heel group Sports Entertainment Xtreme (SEX). After he rejected their offer to join them, members of the group physically stripped Estrada of his costume during an assault. The leaders of SEX then debuted an overweight wrestler with the name Disgraceland to taunt Estrada, wearing his costume.

Estrada defeated Disgraceland on the March 5, 2003 TNA pay-per-view and disappeared from TNA shortly after. He returned to the independent circuit, including some matches with IWA Mid-South. Estrada lost the North American Championship on May 3, 2003, to Hotstuff Hernandez in NWA Wildside.

== Championships and accomplishments ==
- Turnbuckle Championship Wrestling
  - TCW Tag Team Championship (2 times) – with Glacier (1 time) and Sonny Siaki (1 time)
- National Wrestling Alliance
  - NWA North American Heavyweight Championship (1 time)
- Independent Wrestling Association
  - IWA Mid-South North American Heavyweight Championship (1 time)
- Pro Wrestling Illustrated
  - Ranked No. 182 of the top 500 wrestlers in the PWI 500 in 2003
