= Erik Watts =

American professional wrestler and football player (born 1967)

Personal information
- Born: December 19, 1967 (age 58) Amarillo, Texas, U.S.
- Education: University of Louisville
- Family: Bill Watts (father)

Professional wrestling career
- Ring name(s): Amarillo Slim; Erik Watts; Troy
- Billed height: 6 ft 5 in (196 cm)
- Billed weight: 262 lb (119 kg)
- Trained by: Bill Watts
- Debut: 1992
- Retired: 2006
- Football career

No. 13
- Position: Quarterback

Career information
- College: Louisville (1987–1991)

Erik Watts (born December 19, 1967) is an American semi-retired professional wrestler. He is best known for his appearances with World Championship Wrestling and the World Wrestling Federation in the 1990s. He is the son of wrestler Bill Watts.

== Early life ==
Watts attended the University of Louisville, where he was a quarterback for the Louisville Cardinals. He was the team's leading passer in 1991, completing 115 of 260 passes for 1294 yards, 6 touchdowns, and 16 interceptions.

== Professional wrestling career ==
=== World Championship Wrestling (1992–1994) ===
Watts trained as a wrestler under his father, Bill Watts, and after wrestling for three months, he was hired by World Championship Wrestling. He debuted on August 27, 1992, in McMinnville, Tennessee, and began a house show series against Buddy Lee Parker and Mark Canterbury. Still undefeated three months later, Watts would defeat Scotty Flamingo (later known as Raven), Vinnie Vegas, and a rookie Diamond Dallas Page. On November 2 Watts defeated Michael Hayes on WCW Saturday Night, and went on to score multiple victories against Mike Thor and Tex Slazenger. On November 8 he achieved a time-limit draw with Steve Austin on a live event in Winston-Salem, NC. In late November he entered his first feud, facing members of The Dangerous Alliance. On November 25 he upset Bobby Eaton in Baltimore, MD, winning by submission with an STF. The following month Watts took WCW US Champion Rick Rude to several time limit draws, and he gained his first pinfall victory over Steve Austin on December 5 in St Paul, MN. On December 7 at WCW Saturday Night his undefeated streak was ended by Rude. His constant pushes were controversial in that his father was WCW's booker at the time, leading to accusations of nepotism. On December 28, at Starrcade, Watts teamed with Jushin Thunder Liger, in a Lethal Lottery tag team match, losing to "Dr. Death" Steve Williams and Sting.

In January 1993 Watts gained victories over The Barbarian, Tony Atlas, and a returning Paul Orndorff. In February Watts teamed with Buff Bagwell and to take on Hollywood Blonds in a tag team match at SuperBrawl III, which Watts and Bagwell lost. Later in February, he was entered into a tournament to crown a new WCW TV Champion after previous titleholder Scott Steiner had departed four months earlier for the WWF. After defeating Johnny Gunn in the opening round, Watts beat Maxx Payne by disqualification in the quarter-finals. The last two rounds of the tournament were held on March 2 in Macon, GA. Watts pinned Vinnie Vegas in the semifinals, but was defeated by Paul Orndorff in the finals. Following his father's departure from WCW, Erik was targeted by Arn Anderson and began a house show series with The Enforcer as the Four Horsemen began the reformation. Watts continued to perform strongly against lower-level competition, but was defeated by Steve Regal on July 18, 1993, at Beach Blast. In August, he began a house show series with Chris Benoit and came out victorious in each encounter. A month later however he began his first losing streak, dropping matches to WCW TV Champion Steve Regal on multiple occasions.

On November 30, 1993, he was involved in a major angle on WCW Saturday Night. After defeating Paul Orndorff, Paul Roma came out to ringside and attacked Watts. This would lead to the formation of eventual tag-team champions Pretty Wonderful. Meanwhile, Watts continued to be victorious in 1994 against lower-level competition, but was unable to break through against more experienced competition like Regal or Orndorff. His final match was on August 1, 1994, against Jean Paul Levesque in Ft Pierce, FL.

=== World Wrestling Federation (1995–1996) ===
In 1995, Watts followed his father to the World Wrestling Federation. In the WWF, Watts was renamed "Troy" and, together with Chad Fortune as "Travis", formed Tekno Team 2000. Wearing silver smocks and tight zubaz, their gimmick was that they represented the cutting edge of cyberculture. Their tag team made its debut on the May 27, 1995, episode of Superstars in a victorious effort against The Brooklyn Brawler and Barry Horowitz. They wrestled two more matches on TV the following month, but disappeared from television until reappearing at In Your House 2 pay-per-view, acting as lumberjacks for the main event. In the fall of 1995, they were sent down to WWF's development territory, United States Wrestling Association in Memphis. After being absent from TV for a year, they resurfaced in 1996, but still failed to achieve any success and both men were released from the WWF. Watts took a hiatus from wrestling.

=== Return to WCW (1998–1999) ===
Watts returned to wrestling after a two-year hiatus on the April 16, 1998 edition of Thunder, Watts returned to WCW losing to Yuji Nagata. Eight months later Watts made a full-time return, and would win his first 2 matches back out of the gate. Before mainly being used as enhancement talent working on Saturday Night, WorldWide and on rare occasions on Monday Nitro. He would receive a shot at the WCW Television Championship on the March 30 edition of WCW Saturday Night, but would fall short at the hands of Booker T. His last TV appearance was on November 13 as he lost in a match against Disco Inferno on Saturday Night.

=== Extreme Championship Wrestling (2000) ===
Watts joined the Philadelphia-based Extreme Championship Wrestling promotion in 2000, losing to Spike Dudley in his ECW Arena debut. He remained with the promotion until June of that year.

=== All Japan Pro Wrestling (2000) ===
In late 2000, Watts worked for All Japan Pro Wrestling.

=== Turnbuckle Championship Wrestling (2001) ===
In 2001, Watts worked for Dusty Rhodes' Turnbuckle Championship Wrestling in Philadelphia where he won the TCW Tag Team titles with Scotty Riggs.

=== NWA Total Nonstop Action (2002–2005) ===
In 2002, Watts joined NWA Total Nonstop Action. He eventually formed a heel stable with David Flair and Brian Lawler (two other second generation wrestlers whose careers were overshadowed by those of their famous fathers, Ric and Jerry) known as "The Next Generation". After the faction disbanded, Watts turned face. He acted as the TNA Director of Authority from July 23, 2003, to January 28, 2004, before being ousted from his position by Don Callis. Watts then feuded with his on-screen girlfriend, Goldy Locks, throughout 2004. In late 2004, he feuded with Raven, defeating him at Final Resolution on January 16, 2005, before leaving the promotion in February.

=== Retirement (2005–2006) ===
After leaving TNA, Watts began working primarily for the Georgia-based Great Championship Wrestling promotion. He also appeared with AWA Superstars of Wrestling, defeating Diamond Dallas Page for the vacant International Heavyweight Championship on February 4, 2005, in Tucson, Arizona, in a match refereed by Mick Foley. The title was retired by the AWA Board of Directors later that year. In November 2009, Watts returned to Great Championship Wrestling, now based in Phenix City, Alabama, to be the promotion's booker. He is also playing an authority role on their weekly live events.

== Championships and accomplishments ==
- AWA Superstars of Wrestling
  - AWA Superstars of Wrestling International Heavyweight Championship (1 time)
- Great Championship Wrestling
  - GCW Heavyweight Championship (2 times)
  - GCW Tag Team Championship (1 time) – with John Bogie
- NWA Spinebuster
  - NWA Spinebuster Heavyweight Championship (1 time)
- Pro Wrestling Illustrated
  - Rookie of the Year (1992)
  - Ranked No. 37 of the top 500 singles wrestlers in the PWI 500 in 1998
- Turnbuckle Championship Wrestling
  - TCW Tag Team Championship (1 time) – with Scotty Anton
- Wrestling Observer Newsletter
  - Most Overrated Wrestler (1992)
  - Readers' Least Favorite Wrestler (1992)
  - Most Disgusting Promotional Tactic (1992) Being pushed by WCW
