= Main Event Championship Wrestling =

American professional wrestling promotion

Main Event Championship Wrestling, LLC
- Acronym: MECW
- Founded: 2009
- Style: Professional wrestling, sports entertainment
- Headquarters: Evansville, Indiana, United States
- Founder(s): Reno Riggins, Steve Doll, John Collins, and Jason Daniel
- Owner: Jason Daniel
- Website: Official Site

Main Event Championship Wrestling (MECW) is a privately owned professional wrestling promotion founded by Jason Daniel. The company is active in the integrated-media industry, broadcasting its events on television and the Internet. MECW also gains revenue from live events, product licensing, and direct product sales. Jason Daniel is also the President of the company and head booker for MECW events, but only currently works as a part-time wrestler on camera. The company has its headquarters in Evansville, Indiana; its official company name Main Event Championship Wrestling, LLC operates out of its offices and studios in Evansville, Washington and Vincennes, Indiana.

The current owner recognizes prior use of the "Main Event Championship Wrestling" name by Reno Riggins and Steve Doll. The company also recognizes prior use of the MECW name by former promoter John Collins. Reno Riggins and Steve Doll started running a promotion under the MECW name in 1999. According to Jason Daniel, in early 2001, Tracy Smothers and Jason Daniel facilitated the assumed transactional purchase of the MECW set from Reno Riggins and Steve Doll on behalf of former promoter John Collins. This transaction only consisted of an 18 x 18 foot wrestling ring, MECW vinyl banners and 3 championship title belts. With the WWF buyout of World Championship Wrestling, many thought Main Event Championship Wrestling was going to be the next big professional wrestling promotion. In late 2001, John Collins found himself in legal trouble and the promotion ran by Collins, which used the MECW name, ceased to exist.

Since then, Jason Daniel has not only revived the Main Event Championship Wrestling name, but he has also filed the Articles of Incorporation making Main Event Championship Wrestling, LLC a legal entity. On February 15, 2011, Main Event Championship Wrestling was filed to be a registered Trademark of Main Event Championship Wrestling, LLC.

== History ==
=== Formation ===
The concept of the revival of the MECW name originated shortly after the end of Jason Cain's time as head booker at an Evansville, Indiana based local independent promotion, which ran out of the Evansville Veterans Memorial Coliseum. A group, which included: Jason Cain, Chris Thomas, Wade Givens, Josh Stratton, Kyle Wood and John Cooper walked away from the Coliseum group citing they no longer wished to be a part of the promotion as they didn't see it going anywhere, especially if the owners insisted on using untrained self-proclaimed wrestlers. With drawing a consistent 30+ fans each week, this group mentioned above no longer wanted to be associated with the Coliseum-based promotion. Later, with help from Jeremy Lewis and Eric Gilley, they all realized each had similar vision of a much bigger promotion, which led them to organize their debut show at The Centre in downtown Evansville, Indiana. This debut show, titled MECW Arrives, featured a double main event. The first main event match consisted of former TNA Tag Team Champion, "Natural" Chase Stevens vs TNA Founder, Jeff Jarrett. The headlined main event consisted of former OVW Superstar, Dirty Money vs WWE Hall of Famer, Jerry "The King" Lawler. This show received high praise as the show that featured two active wrestlers from both WWE and TNA under one roof.

=== Expansion ===
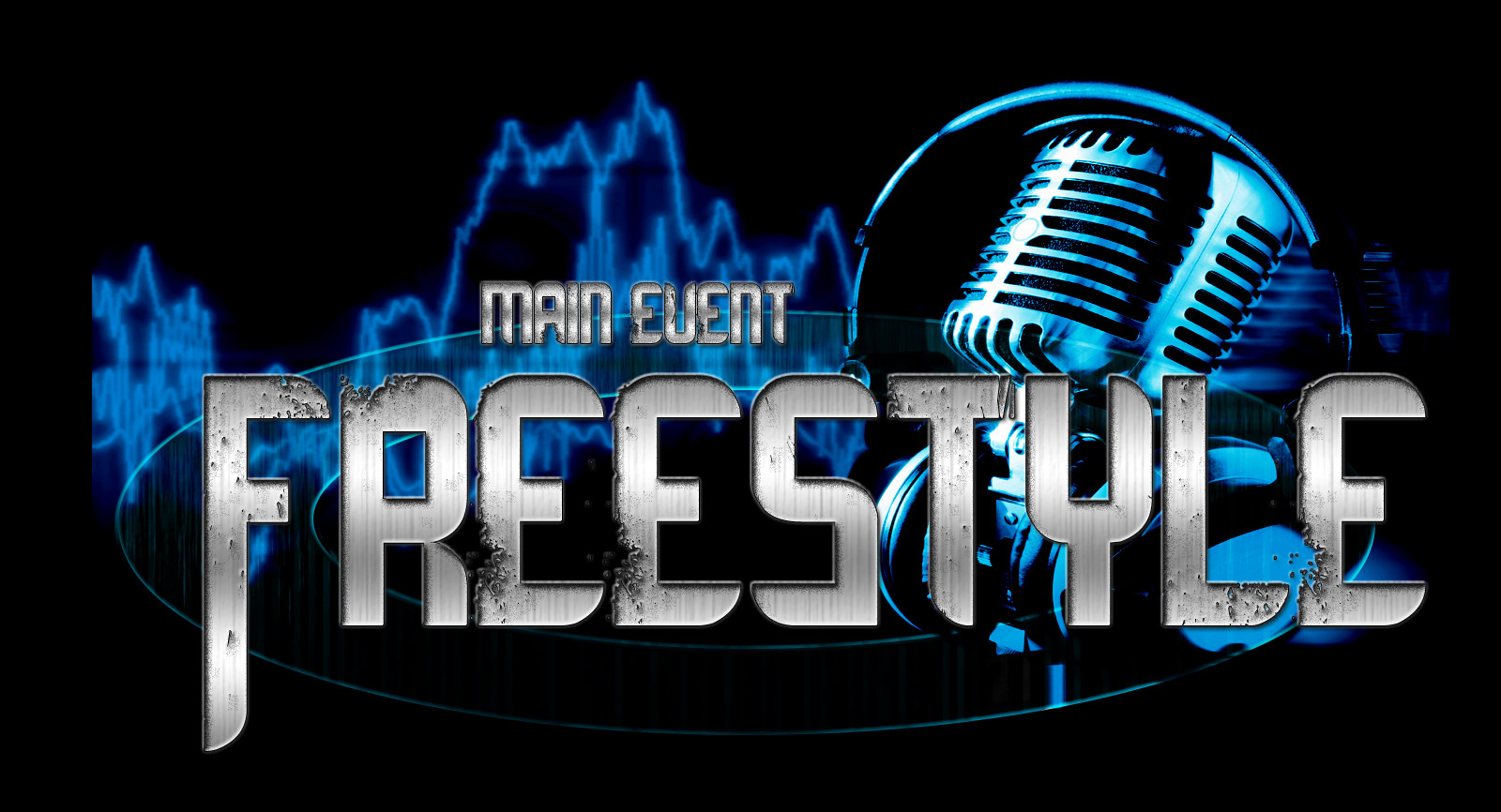
Main Event Freestyle

MECW aired its first TV show on this station on September 4, 2010. Shortly after, with the suggestion from the live commentators (Nic Wood and Kyle Wood), the company began its talk show segments known as the "Main Event Freestyle". With the success and local popularity of this TV show, this led MECW Management to make a decision to seek even more households via larger networks. MECW is currently in negotiations with a major affiliate network. MECW is also currently mapping out a new territory system, in which they hope to implement sometime in late 2011.

== House shows and touring ==
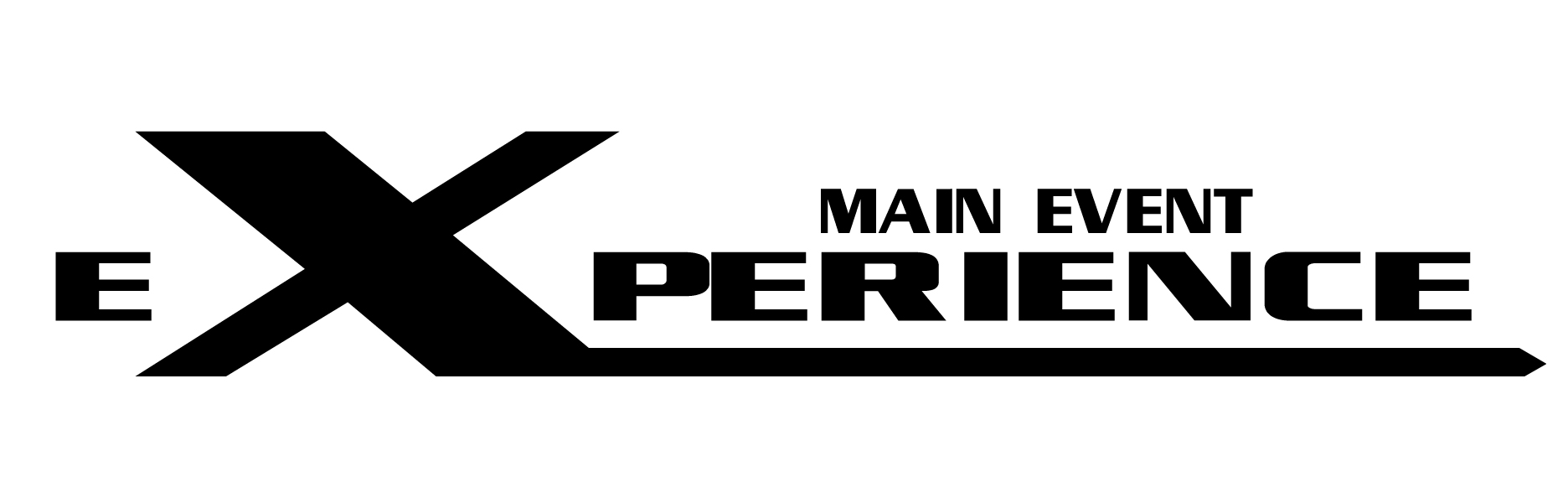
Main Event Experience

Apart from their TV tapings, MECW has also produced DVDs of various live events. MECW Arrives, MECW Returns and MECW Supershow at Vincennes University. Since MECW's inception by Jason Daniel, the MECW live events have been held in Evansville, Monroe City, Cannelton and Vincennes, Indiana.

Other shows and TV Tapings include, July 31, 2010 in Monroe City, IN. Also, August 14, 2010, which featured Former NWA/TNA Tag Team Champion, Chase Stevens vs Former WWE Superstar, 'Psycho' Sid Vicious in Evansville, IN. Also, an August 28, 2010 show featured Former WWE Spirit Squad member, Kenny Dykstra. Another show on January 15, 2011. MECW began using the title "Main Event Experience" for its TV Tapings, as well as its CBS Affiliate MY44 TV show.

Benefit show - On July 31, 2010, Main Event Championship Wrestling participated in carrying out a wrestling show to help benefit three different organizations, Survivors of Suicide, Muscular Dystrophy Foundation and Helping Area Residents Through Tragedy. This show was put on last minute, because the group that was supposed to put on the show backed out at the last minute.

Prior to this inception, MECW events spanned from Vincennes to Marion, Lafayette, and Evansville, Indiana, as well as Nashville, Kingsport and various other cities in Tennessee.

== Personnel ==
=== Creative team ===
In the John Collins era, the creative team consisted of Mark Mayhugh, Jeff Lane, Chase Stevens and Jason Cain. The Sandman booked the 08-11-2001 Philadelphia, PA show. This team was grouped for all other MECW business. This group also primarily booked towns for live events as well.

Currently, Jason Daniel holds the position of head talent booker. He also leads the creative team of Chris Thomas and Wade Givens, with additional creative input from a TV production standpoint from Tracey Russell, Jeremy Lewis, Josh Stratton, Kyle Wood and Chad Matthews.

=== Authority figures ===
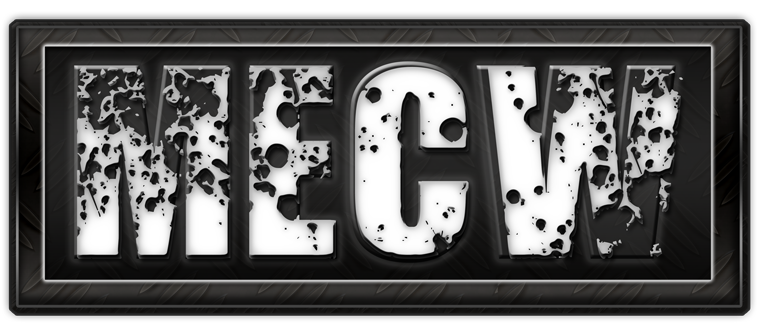
MECW License Plate Logo

When MECW once again launched in 2010, it billed the on-air authority figure as a representative appointed by Main Event Championship Wrestling. This authority figure was known as MECW Executive Vice President, Alexander C. West. It did this for storyline purposes only.

As storylines progressed, Alexander C. West became quite a notable heel with less than favorable "Management decisions". This later prompted the "release" of A.C. West and opened the door for a new authority figure, known as the new Executive Vice President, Chad Matthews. This person still currently holds this authority figure role. A.C. West since returned, once again as the Manager of Champions. The storyline found him returning, not as an MECW employee, but as an independently contracted Manager hired by each individual wrestler to get "around" his formal release.

=== MECW contracts ===
MECW wrestlers are not currently under any exclusive contract. The roster of MECW wrestlers are paid on a per appearance basis. This includes wrestlers currently under WWE and TNA contracts.

Like World Wrestling Entertainment and Total Nonstop Action Wrestling, MECW wrestlers are classified as independent contractors and are not entitled to form workers' unions or employer health coverage.

== Championships ==
Championship	Current champion(s)	Previous champion(s)	Date won	Location
MECW Heavyweight Championship	Vacant	Curt Hennig	July 14, 2001	
MECW Television Championship	Vacant	Zachary Raiden	October 31, 2014	
MECW Tag Team Championship	The Hybrids	The Bad Boys	February 4, 2011	Vincennes, Indiana
