= Scotty Riggs =

American former professional wrestler (born 1967)

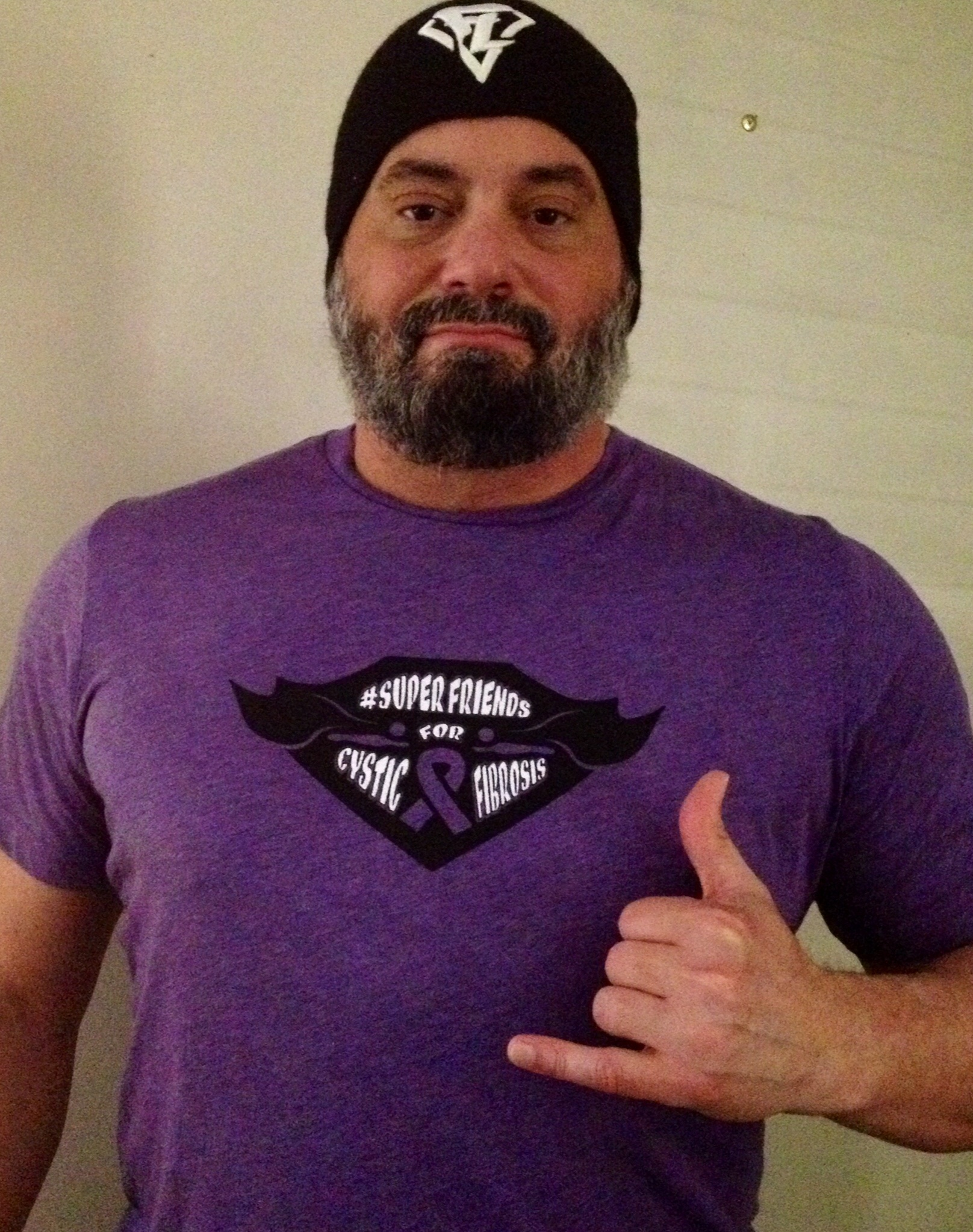
- Riggs in 2014

Personal information
- Born: Scott Antol; March 1, 1967 (age 59) Savannah, Georgia, U.S.

Professional wrestling career
- Ring name(s): Kendo the Samurai; Riggs; Scott Studd; Scotty Anton; Scotty Riggs
- Billed height: 6 ft 0 in (183 cm)
- Billed weight: 251 lb (114 kg)
- Billed from: Atlanta, Georgia
- Trained by: Ted Allen
- Debut: 1992
- Retired: 2024

Scott Antol (born March 1, 1967) is a retired American professional wrestler. He is best known for his tenure with World Championship Wrestling (WCW) from 1993 to 1999, under the ring names Scotty Riggs and Riggs. Antol is also known for his appearances with Extreme Championship Wrestling (ECW) as Scotty Anton. He currently works backstage for All Elite Wrestling (AEW).

== Professional wrestling career ==
=== Early years (1992–1995) ===
Antol debuted on June 2, 1992 using the ring name Scott Studd after being trained by Ted "The Nightmare" Allen. Allen trained Studd by teaching while wrestling in front of live crowds. In the early 1990s, he worked for various independent promotions, including the North Georgia Wrestling Association (NGWA), Peach State Championship Wrestling (PSCW), Smoky Mountain Wrestling (SMW), and the United States Wrestling Association (USWA).

=== World Championship Wrestling (1993–1999) ===
==== Scott Studd (1993–1995) ====
Antol made his WCW debut in 1993 as Scott Studd, working as a jobber.

==== American Males (1995–1997) ====
Antol signed a contract with World Championship Wrestling in 1995 and was renamed Scotty Riggs, with his last name taken from Mel Gibson's character, Martin Riggs, from the Lethal Weapon films. He was immediately placed in to a tag team with Marcus Alexander Bagwell and they became known as the American Males. Together, they captured their first and only World Tag Team Championship, but only held it for eight days before losing it back to Harlem Heat, the team they won it from in the first place. The team competed on a tour of Germany for WCW at this time.

The American Males broke up in November 1996 after Bagwell turned heel on Riggs and joined the New World Order. Following the split, Riggs began competing as a singles competitor. He immediately entered a feud with Bagwell, which resulted in a match at nWo Souled Out which he lost and a rematch at Uncensored in a strap match where Riggs was choked out by Bagwell with the strap while hanging from the ropes.

==== Raven's Flock and departure (1997–1999) ====
After performing in the mid-card for most of 1997, Raven took an interest in him and during a No Disqualification match on the October 27 edition of Nitro, Raven caught Riggs in a drop toe-hold, sending him face-first into a steel chair and injuring his eye in the process. Riggs then began wearing an eye patch and, to this day, claims that the eye injury was legitimate. At first, Riggs resisted joining Raven's Flock, but eventually joined after they kidnapped him following his loss to Raven at the World War 3 pay-per-view. Raven explained that Riggs's "ocular disability" had alienated him from society and that he was seeking acceptance within The Flock. Riggs remained within The Flock until Saturn defeated Raven at Fall Brawl: War Games in a match that forced The Flock to disband.

Following The Flock's disbanding, Riggs remained a heel and adopted a narcissistic gimmick. However, the gimmick was unsuccessful, and Riggs remained on the undercard before being released from WCW in 1999.

=== Extreme Championship Wrestling (2000–2001) ===
In 2000, Antol debuted in Extreme Championship Wrestling as Scotty Anton, aligning with his real-life friend Rob Van Dam. At Hardcore Heaven, Anton betrayed Van Dam, knocking him off the top rope to the floor, allowing Jerry Lynn to pin him and thus end Van Dam's two-year undefeated streak. From there, he joined The Network as a "hired gun". Van Dam gained revenge at Heat Wave, where he defeated Anton by using his new Van Terminator finisher.

=== Independent circuit and retirement (2001–2003, 2007–2024) ===
After leaving ECW, Antol returned to the independent circuit, where he found his greatest success in Turnbuckle Championship Wrestling (TCW). While competing for TCW, he became a three time Heavyweight Champion and a one time TCW Tag Team Champion with Erik Watts. Following TCW's closure in 2003, Antol took time away from professional wrestling to deal with personal issues of divorce and his father developing lung cancer. His father died from the illness in 2004. Following this, Antol moved to Hilton Head Island, South Carolina to work as a bouncer and manager at a lounge.

Upon getting his life together, Antol resumed his wrestling career under his Scotty Riggs ring name, where he wrestled several matches for AWA World-1 Championship Wrestling in 2007 before retiring in 2009 due to injuries.

In 2024, he returned to wrestling, working for Major League Wrestling and independents.

=== All Elite Wrestling (2024–present) ===
On March 3, 2024, Antol was shown in the crowd during Sting's retirement match at AEW's Revolution alongside Nikita Koloff. In December 2024, it was reported that Antol was working for AEW in a backstage capacity by helping provide logistical support, including driving talent to and from venues. This was confirmed by AEW commentator Tony Schiavone one month later.

== Championships and accomplishments ==
- Peach State Wrestling
  - PSW United States Heavyweight Championship (1 time)
- Pro Wrestling Illustrated
  - PWI ranked him #134 of the 500 best singles wrestlers of the PWI 500 in 1996
  - PWI ranked him #461 of the best 500 singles wrestlers of the "PWI Years" in 2003
- Smoky Mountain Wrestling
  - SMW Beat the Champ Television Championship (1 time)
- Turnbuckle Championship Wrestling
  - TCW Heavyweight Championship (3 times)
  - TCW Tag Team Championship (1 time) – with Erik Watts
- World Championship Wrestling
  - WCW World Tag Team Championship (1 time) – with Marcus Bagwell
