= WCW Magazine =

Official magazine of World Championship Wrestling

- The final edition (number 73) of WCW Magazine featuring Diamond Dallas Page on the cover
- Founded: 1989
- Final issue: 2001
- Company: WCW
- Country: USA
- Language: English

WCW Magazine was the official professional wrestling magazine of World Championship Wrestling (WCW). This incarnation of the magazine contained lifestyle sections, a monthly calendar, entertainment, work out tips, and other information. Originally known as NWA/WCW Wrestling Wrap-Up from 1989 to 1991 with Dennis Brent as Editor-in-Chief. WCW Magazine was launched and ran from 1991 to 1994 from Kappa Publishing. It was relaunched in 1995 running to 1999 and was published and edited by Colin Bowman. Between 1999 and 2001 the final issues were published in-house by WCW, ceasing once the wrestling promotion was sold to WWE.

The August 1991 edition of WCW Magazine sold 80,000 copies in Great Britain, making it the highest selling imported magazine launch to that point.

== See also ==
- List of professional wrestling magazines
