= NWA Georgia Tag Team Championship =

Professional wrestling tag team championship

- Previous version of the NWA Georgia Tag Team Championship belt

Details
- Promotion: Georgia Championship Wrestling; NWA Wildside
- Date established: July 5, 1968
- Date retired: November 22, 2005

Other names
- MCW/NWA Georgia Tag Team Championship; NWA Wildside Tag Team Championship
Statistics
- First champions: Alberto and Ramon Torres
- Most reigns: The Assassins (12 reigns) (as individual) Ole Anderson (17 reigns)
- Longest reign: The Texas Death Club (Masada and Todd Sexton) (189 days)
- Shortest reign: Pomp and Circumstance (Ace Rodwell and Shaun Tempers) (Less than 1 day)

The NWA Georgia Tag Team Championship was the top tag team championship in Georgia Championship Wrestling from 1968 to 1980, when it was replaced with the NWA National Tag Team Championship.

The title was revived in 1998 by Music City Wrestling as the MCW/NWA Georgia Tag Team Championship. In 1999, it became the top tag team title in NWA Georgia/Wildside as the NWA Wildside Tag Team Championship, until April 2005, when Wildside closed. After the close of NWA Wildside/Anarchy, the Georgia Tag Team Championships were revived by NWA Action. With the close of NWA Action in 2016, Georgia Championship Wrestling remerged in late 2020 and revived the titles in 2021.In 2025, Georgia Championship Wrestling dissolved and became Georgia Classic Wrestling and continued recognizing the Georgia Tag Team Championships.

== Title history ==
(n) indicates that a title change happened no later than the date listed. Silver marks in the history indicate periods of unknown lineage.

Wrestlers:	Times:	Date:	Location:	Notes:
NWA Georgia Tag Team Championship
Mike Paidousis and Wild Man Zimm face Jack Steele and El Toro for the title on September 20, 1954, in Valdosta, Georgia; however, it is unclear which team holds the title at this point.
El Toro and Whitey Whittier	1	September 30, 1955	Atlanta, GA	Defeat Farmer Jones and Danny O'Shocker and still champions as of October 15, 1955.
The Torres Brothers (Alberto and Ramon)	1	July 5, 1968	Atlanta, Georgia	Defeated El Mongol and Tarzan Tyler in an 8-team tournament final.
The Vachon Family (Butcher and Stan)	1	September 6, 1968	Atlanta, Georgia	
The Torres Brothers (Alberto and Ramon)	2	September 20, 1968	Atlanta, Georgia	
The Vachon Family (Butcher and Stan Vachon)	2	October 29, 1968	Savannah, Georgia	
The Torres Brothers (Alberto and Ramon)	3	November 11, 1968		
The Assassins (Assassin #1 and Assassin #2)	1	November 22, 1968	Atlanta, Georgia	
The Torres Brothers (Alberto and Ramon)	4	December 25, 1969		
Assassin #2 and The Professional	1	January 25, 1969		
The title was vacant on March 21, 1969, after the match against Buddy Fuller and Ray Gunkel.
The Assassins (Assassin #1 and Assassin #2 (3))	2	April 4, 1969	Atlanta, Georgia	Defeated El Mongol and Louie Tillet in a one night 8-team tournament final.
El Mongol and The Professional (2)	1	June 27, 1969	Atlanta, Georgia	
Mr. Ito and Chati Yokouchi	1	July 10, 1969	Athens, Georgia	
The Assassins (Assassin #1 and Assassin #2 (4))	3	August 8, 1969		
Buddy Fuller and Ray Gunkel	1	October 10, 1969	Atlanta, Georgia	
The Assassins (Assassin #1 and Assassin #2 (5))	4	December 19, 1969	Atlanta, Georgia	With Nick Bockwinkel, defeated Fuller, Gunkel and The Professional in a six-man tag team match in which Fuller and Gunkel's title was on the line.
Buddy Fuller and Ray Gunkel	2	March 20, 1970	Atlanta, Georgia	
The title was vacated on June 1, 1970, when Gunkel decides Georgia singles title.
The Professional (3) and Bobby Shane	1	July 3, 1970	Atlanta, Georgia	Defeated Bubby Colt and Homer O'Dell in a tournament final.
The Assassins (Assassin #1 and Assassin #2 (6))	5	August 28, 1970	Atlanta, Georgia	
The title was vacated on September 25, 1970, due to an illegal headgear worn.
The Assassins (Assassin #1 and Assassin #2 (7))	6	October 16, 1970	Atlanta, Georgia	Defeated Mr. Ito and The Great Ota and The Professional and Bobby Shane in a three-team tournament.
Ray Gunkel (3) and El Mongol (2)	1	April 2, 1971	Atlanta, Georgia	
The Assassins (Assassin #1 and Assassin #2 (8))	7	June 11, 1971	Atlanta, Georgia	
The title was held up on October 1, 1971, after the match against Dick Steinborn and George Scott.
The Assassins (Assassin #1 and Assassin #2 (9))	8	October 8, 1971		Defeats Dick Steinborn and George Scott in a rematch.
The title was stripped on November 20, 1971, due to multiple infractions over recent months.
The Assassins (Assassin #1 and Assassin #2 (10))	9	November 26, 1971	Atlanta, Georgia	Defeated Bob Armstrong and Bill Dromo by forfeit in a one night 7-team tournament final, due to Armstrong being injured.
Buddy Fuller and Ray Gunkel (4)	3	December 17, 1971	Atlanta, Georgia	
The Assassins (Assassin #1 and Assassin #2 (11))	10	March 10, 1972		
The title was held up on August 25, 1972, after The Assassins intentionally got disqualified in a match against Bob Armstrong and Dick Steinborn.
Skandor Akbar and Ox Baker	1	September 15, 1972	Atlanta, Georgia	Defeat Bob Armstrong and Dick Steinborn in one night 8-team tournament final.
Argentina Apollo and Dick Steinborn	1	October 20, 1972	Atlanta, Georgia	
The title was vacated on November 1, 1972, when Apollo and Steinborn quit GCW to open All-South Championship Wrestling with Ann Gunkel.
The Graham Family (Eddie and Mike Graham)	1	December 29, 1972	Atlanta, Georgia	Defeated Rocket Monroe and Sputnik Monroe in a one night 4-team tournament final.
The Super Infernos (Doug Lindzy (4) and Don Smith)	1	May 11, 1973		
Bob Orton, Jr. and Mr. Wrestling II	1	June 9, 1973		
The Super Infernos (Doug Lindzy (5) and Don Smith (2))	2	August 4, 1973		
The title was stripped on September 3, 1973, when The Super Infernos got themselves deliberately disqualified in Savannah, Georgia.
Bobby Duncum and Stan Vachon (3)	1	September 21, 1973	Atlanta, Georgia	
Bob Armstrong and Robert Fuller	1	October 27, 1973		
Gorgeous George, Jr. and Bobby Shane (2)	1	December 21, 1973	Atlanta, Georgia	
The title was held up on January 4, 1974, after a match against Bob Armstrong and Robert Fuller in Atlanta, Georgia.
The Garvin's (Ron and Terry)	1	January 18, 1974	Atlanta, Georgia	Defeated Bob Armstrong and Robert Fuller in a tournament final.
Bob Armstrong and Robert Fuller	2	March 8, 1974	Atlanta, Georgia	
The Garvin's (Ron and Terry)	2	March 15, 1974	Atlanta, Georgia	
Bob Armstrong and Robert Fuller	3	May 24, 1974	Atlanta, Georgia	
The Minnesota Wrecking Crew (Gene and Ole Anderson)	1	May 31, 1974	Atlanta, Georgia	
Mr. Wrestling I and Mr. Wrestling II	3	August 2, 1974	Atlanta, Georgia	
The Minnesota Wrecking Crew (Gene and Ole Anderson)	2	August 16, 1974	Atlanta, Georgia	Defeated Harley Race and Mr. Wrestling I after Mr. Wrestling II paid $10,000 to defend his half of the title for him.
Mr. Wrestling I and Mr. Wrestling II	2	September 6, 1974	Atlanta, Georgia	
The Minnesota Wrecking Crew (Gene and Ole Anderson)	3	September 20, 1974	Atlanta, Georgia	
The title was held up on October 25, 1974, after a match against Buddy Colt and Harley Race in Atlanta, Georgia.
Buddy Colt and Roger Kirby	1	November 1, 1974	Atlanta, Georgia	Defeated The Minnesota Wrecking Crew.
Jerry Brisco and Rocky Johnson	1	January 25, 1975	Atlanta, Georgia	
Assassin #2 (12) and Toru Tanaka	1	March 17, 1975		
Bob Armstrong and Robert Fuller	4	May 9, 1975	Atlanta, Georgia	
Bob Orton, Jr. (2) and Dick Slater	1	June 27, 1975	Atlanta, Georgia	
The title was vacated on July 29, 1975, when Orton and Slater wina Macon Tag Team Championship.
Mr. Fuji and Toru Tanaka (2)	1	September 19, 1975	Atlanta, Georgia	Defeat Tony Garea and Dean Ho in a one-night 4-team tournament final.
Bob Backlund and Jerry Brisco	1	October 16, 1975		
Tony Charles and Les Thornton	1	December 3, 1975		
Jerry Oates and Ted Oates	1	March 19, 1976	Atlanta, Georgia	
The Red Devils (Black Gordman and Great Goliath)	1	June 7, 1976		
Dean Ho and Ken Mantell	1	July 2, 1976	Atlanta, Georgia	
Jimmy and Johnny Valiant	1	July 16, 1976	Atlanta, Georgia	
The Black Bombers (Porkchop Cash and Tom Jones)	1	September 3, 1976	Atlanta, Georgia	
The Minnesota Wrecking Crew (Gene and Ole Anderson)	4	October 22, 1976	Atlanta, Georgia	
Mr. Wrestling I and Mr. Wrestling II	3	January 14, 1977		
The title was held up after match with The Minnesota Wrecking Crew on February 8, 1977.
Mr. Wrestling I and Mr. Wrestling II	4	February 15, 1977		Defeat The Minnesota Wrecking Crew in a rematch.
The Minnesota Wrecking Crew (Gene and Ole Anderson)	5	February 25, 1977	Atlanta, Georgia	
Thunderbolt Patterson and Mr. Wrestling I (5)	1	April 29, 1977	Atlanta, Georgia	
The Minnesota Wrecking Crew (Gene and Ole Anderson)	6	June 10, 1977		
The title was vacant when The Minnesota Wrecking Crew leave the area on September 6, 1977.
Tony Atlas and Tommy Rich	1	September 9, 1977		Defeat Pak Song and The Executioner in a one-night 8-team tournament final.
The Executioner and Pak Song	1	September 16, 1977		
Tony Atlas and Tommy Rich	2	November 15, 1977		
Ole Anderson (7) and Jacques Goulet	1	December 13, 1977	Macon, Georgia	
Tony Atlas (3) and Mr. Wrestling II (5)	1	February 7, 1978	Columbus, Georgia	
The Minnesota Wrecking Crew (Lars and Ole Anderson (8))	1	February 27, 1978	Macon, Georgia	
Thunderbolt Patterson (2) and Tommy Rich (3)	1	March 21, 1978	Atlanta, Georgia	
The Minnesota Wrecking Crew (Lars and Ole Anderson (9))	2	April 28, 1978		
Thunderbolt Patterson (3) and Tommy Rich (4)	2	May 5, 1978		
Ole Anderson (10) and Ivan Koloff	1	June 7, 1978		
Rick Martel and Tommy Rich (5)	1	September 23, 1978	Atlanta, Georgia	
Ole Anderson (11) and Stan Hansen	1	October 20, 1978		
The title was vacant on November 11, 1978, due to too many DQ's.
The Funks (Dory Funk, Jr. and Terry Funk)	1	November 23, 1978	Atlanta, Georgia	Defeated The Brisco Brothers Jack and Jerry Brisco in a tournament final.
The Brisco Brothers (Jack and Jerry (4))	1	January 1, 1979	Atlanta, Georgia	
Ole Anderson (12) and Ivan Koloff	2	January 19, 1979	Atlanta, Georgia	
Norvell Austin and Rufus R. Jones	1	April 25, 1979	Augusta, Georgia	
The title was vacant on May 1, 1979, when Norvell Austin and Rufus R. Jones leaves the area.
Wahoo McDaniel and Tommy Rich (6)	1	May 18, 1979	Atlanta, Georgia	Defeated Ole Anderson and Ivan Koloff for the vacant titles.
Ole Anderson (13) and Ivan Koloff	3	June 8, 1979	Atlanta, Georgia	
Stan Hansen ^{(2)} and Tommy Rich ^{(7)}	1	July 2, 1979	Augusta, Georgia	
Ole Anderson (14) and Ivan Koloff	4	August 31, 1979	Atlanta, Georgia	
Crusher Lisowski and Tommy Rich (8)	1	September 21, 1979	Atlanta, Georgia	
Ole Anderson (15) and Ernie Ladd	1	October 5, 1979		
The title was vacant on October 15, 1979, after Ole Anderson turns face and the team splits up.
Austin Idol and The Masked Superstar	1	November 22, 1979	Atlanta, Georgia	Defeat The Brisco Brothers Jack and Jerry Brisco in a one-night 10-team tournament final.
The Brisco Brothers (Jack and Jerry (5))	2	November 30, 1979		
Ole Anderson (16) and Jerry Brisco (6)	1	December 5, 1979		Jack Brisco gave his half of the title to Anderson.
Ivan Koloff (5) and Alexis Smirnoff	1	December 7, 1979		
Tony Atlas (4) and Kevin Sullivan	1	April 21, 1980	Atlanta, Georgia	
Ivan Koloff (6) and Alexis Smirnoff	2	April 24, 1980	Atlanta, Georgia	This was the infamous "ether rag" match where a rag laced with ether was used on Tony Atlas and resulted in Ivan Koloff pinning Atlas.
The Minnesota Wrecking Crew (Lars and Ole Anderson (17))	3	June 8, 1980	Atlanta, Georgia	
The Assassins (Assassin #1 (11) and Assassin #3)	1	June 16, 1980	Augusta, Georgia	
Steve Keirn and Mr. Wrestling I (6)	1	July 30, 1980	Columbus, Ohio	
The Assassins (Assassin #1 (12) and Assassin #3)	2	August 6, 1980	Columbus, Ohio	
Mr. Wrestling I (7) and Mr. Wrestling II (6)	5	September 19, 1980	Atlanta, Georgia	
The Fabulous Freebirds (Terry Gordy and Michael Hayes)	1	October 10, 1980	Atlanta, Georgia	Won a three-team tournament, defeating Mr. Wrestling I and Mr. Wrestling II and The Assassins.
The title was held up on November 14, 1980, after a match against Austin Idol and Kevin Sullivan. Later The Fabulous Freebirds defeated Robert Fuller and Stan Frazier in a tournament final to become the first NWA National Tag Team Champions on November 27, 1980, in Atlanta, Georgia. The National title was eventually unified with the Georgia title, ending its lineage here.
MCW/NWA Georgia Tag Team Championship
Hot and Heavy (Frenchy Riviera and Silky Boom Boom)	1	October 17, 1998	Eatonton, Georgia	Defeated Shane Helms and Mike Maverick and The Centerfolds in a 3-way elimination match for the inactive title.
The Samoan Death Squad (Faku and Spade)	1	March 11, 1999	Loganville, Georgia	
Billy Black and Joel Deaton	1	April 1, 1999	Loganville, Georgia	
The title was stripped on June 10, 1999, in Loganville, Georgia when Black attacked promoter Bill Behrens.
Rukkus and Vic Violent	1	June 10, 1999	Loganville, Georgia	Defeated Mark Davis and Faku.
The title was stripped on August 19, 1999, when Rukkus and Violent no-showed a title defense.
The Sex Pistols (David and Shane Young)	1	August 19, 1999	Loganville, Georgia	Defeated Terry Lawler and Bart Sawyer for the vacant titles.
The Road Hoggs (Joe Harley and Pan Head Nelson)	1	November 20, 1999	Cornelia, Georgia	Defeated Rick Michaels (subbing for Shane Young) and David Young to win both the NWA Georgia Tag Team Championship and the National Championship Wrestling (NCW) Tag Team Championship and unify both titles.
The title becomes a part of NWA Wildside, formed from the merger of National Championship Wrestling and NWA Georgia.
NWA Wildside Tag Team Championship
The Underdogs (Big Eddie Cool and Mark E. Mark)	1	December 4, 1999	Cornelia, Georgia	
Bad Attitude (Rick Michaels and David Young (2))	1	January 8, 2000	Cornelia, Georgia	
The Rock 'n' Roll Express (Robert Gibson and Ricky Morton)	1	February 19, 2000	Cornelia, Georgia	
Bad Attitude (Rick Michaels and David Young (3))	2	June 17, 2000	Cornelia, Georgia	
The title was vacated when Bad Attitude won the NWA World Tag Team Championship, defeating Triple X (Drake Dawson and Curtis Thompson) on August 15, 2000, in Tampa, Florida.
The Boogaloo Crew (J.C. Dazz and Scottie Wrenn)	1	August 19, 2000	Cornelia, Georgia	Defeated Terry Knight and Onyx in a tournament final.
Suicidal Tendencies (Adam Jacobs and John Phoenix)	1	January 6, 2001	Cornelia, Georgia	
3 Count (Shane Helms and Shannon Moore)	1	January 19, 2001	Cornelia, Georgia	
The Boogaloo Crew (J.C. Dazz and Scottie Wrenn)	2	January 20, 2001	Cornelia, Georgia	Defeated 3 Count and Suicidal Tendencies in a three-way match.
The Kohl Brothers (Keith Kohl and Kent Kohl)	1	February 3, 2001	Cornelia, Georgia	
Romeo Bliss and David Flair	1	March 24, 2001	Cornelia, Georgia	
The Boogaloo Crew (J.C. Dazz and Scottie Wrenn)	2	April 21, 2001	Cornelia, Georgia	
TNT (Todd Sexton and Tony Stradlin)	1	August 4, 2001	Cornelia, Georgia	
Blackout (Homicide and Rainman)	1	August 10, 2001	Kingsport, Tennessee	Total Destruction (Rusty Riddle and Sean Royal) defeated Blackout on the same night, however, due to Total Destruction being banned from NWA Wildside for 30 days, the titles were returned to Blackout on August 18, 2001, in Cornelia, Georgia.
Project Mayhem (Tank Trash and White Trash)	1	October 19, 2001	Cornelia, Georgia	
Blackout (Homicide and Rainman)	2	November 17, 2001	Cornelia, Georgia	Defeated Project Mayhem, Bad Attitude (Terry Knight and David Young) and The Lost Boyz (Azrieal and Gabriel) in a four-way match.
The Lost Boyz (Azrael (2) and Gabriel)	1	March 22, 2002	Cornelia, Georgia	This was a ladder match and Azrael formerly known as Mark. E. Mark.
The Briscoe Brothers (Jay Briscoe and Mark Briscoe)	1	August 3, 2002	Cornelia, Georgia	Defeated The Lost Boyz, TNT and The S.A.T. (Joél Maximo and José Maximo) in an elimination match, last defeating TNT.
TNT (Todd Sexton and Tony Stradlin)	2	August 17, 2002	Cornelia, Georgia	
Tank (2) and Scottie Wrenn (3)	1	November 2, 2002	Cornelia, Georgia	
Future Shock (Jay Freeze and Brandon P.)	1	March 28, 2003	Cornelia, Georgia	Defeated Tank and Scottie Wrenn and The Lost Boyz in a three-way ladder match.
The Impact (Scott Cage and Kaos)	1	June 20, 2003	Cornelia, Georgia	
Bulldog Raines and Tank (3)	1	July 19, 2003	Cornelia, Georgia	
Brandon P. (2) and Jeremy Vain	1	October 18, 2003	Cornelia, Georgia	
The Texas Death Club (Masada and Todd Sexton)	1	December 27, 2003	Cornelia, Georgia	
Murder One and Slim J.	1	July 3, 2004	Cornelia, Georgia	This was a WarGames match.
Mikael Adryan and Azrael (3)	1	September 18, 2004	Cornelia, Georgia	
Devils Reject (Iceberg and Tank (4))	1	January 1, 2005	Cornelia, Georgia	Defeated Adryan and Azrael and Pomp and Circumstance (Ace Rockwell and Shaun Tempers) in a three-way elimination match.
Pomp and Circumstance (Ace Rockwell and Shaun Tempers)	1	March 5, 2005	Cornelia, Georgia	
Devils Reject (Iceberg and Tank (5))	2	March 26, 2005	Cornelia, Georgia	
The title reverted to its original name when NWA Wildside closed on April 30, 2005.
NWA Georgia Tag Team Championship
Pomp and Circumstance (Ace Rockwell and Shaun Tempers)	2	November 22, 2005	Soddy-Daisy, Tennessee	Won at an NWA Wildside reunion event.
The title become inactive on December 30, 2005
Bald Beautiful Besties (Michael Stevens and Zac Edwards)	1	June 2014		
Blunt Force Trauma (Bill the Butcher and Pain)	1	October 25, 2014	Griffin, Georgia	
Young Lions (Lex Lee and Kevin Coffman)	1	February 28, 2015	Stockbridge, Georgia	
Drew Adler and Fry Daddy	1	June 13, 2015	Locust Grove, Georgia	
The title vacant on January 23, 2016, after the team splits
Cryme Tyme (JTG and Shad Gaspard)	1	February 13, 2016	Atlanta, Georgia	
The Face of Pain (Andy Anderson and Pain (2))	1	February 27, 2016	Locust Grove, Georgia	
GCW Georgia Tag Team Championship
100 Proof (Chris and Jerry Nelms)	1	May 22, 2021	Buckhead, Georgia	The title vacated on February 28, 2016, after close of NWA Atlanta is revived as part of the revival of GCW
6:05 Wrecking Crew (Big Andy and Swole)	1	April 30, 2022	Buckhead, Georgia	
The Grapplers	1	October 22, 2022	Buckhead, Georgia	
Alex Kytel & Alexander Lev	1	May 27, 2023	Buckhead, Georgia	
The Grapplers	2	July 29, 2023	Buckhead, Georgia	
100 Proof (Chris and Jerry Nelms)	2	September 30, 2023	Buckhead, Georgia	
The Grapplers	3	December 23, 2023	Buckhead, Georgia	
Unrated (TJ Trigger & Austin Thorne)	1	June 29, 2024	Buckhead, Georgia	This was a triple threat match also featuring Scott Mayson & Stevie Frost
The Enterprise (The Ultimate Pusher Tyreke, Dee Munny, Luke Stone)	1	October 26, 2024	Buckhead, Georgia	
The Crusade (Pat Roach & Grillo)	1	February 22, 2025	Buckhead, Georgia	This was a triple threat match also featuring The Unrated
Dead Man’s Hand(Chop Top & Jerry Nelms)	1	June 28, 2025	Buckhead, Georgia	
Bad Company (Jay Shaw & Chris Nelms)	1	September 5, 2025	Milledgeville, GA	
Chainsaws & Chuckles	1	March 28, 2026	Buckhead, Georgia	
Bad Company (Jay Shaw & Chris Nelms)	2	May 30, 2026	Buckhead, Georgia	
The Enterprise ( The Ultimate Pusher Tyreke, Dee Munny, Luke Stone)	2	September 6, 2026	Milledgeville, Georgia	

== See also ==
- Georgia Championship Wrestling
- National Wrestling Alliance
- NWA National Tag Team Championship
- NWA Wildside
