= Iceberg (wrestler) =

American professional wrestler

Personal information
- Born: Edward Chastain

Professional wrestling career
- Ring name(s): Edward Chastain; Iceberg
- Billed height: 6 ft 1 in (1.85 m)
- Billed weight: 385 lb (175 kg)
- Billed from: "Places Men Fear to Tread"
- Trained by: Abdullah the Butcher

Edward Chastain is an American professional wrestler, better known by his ring name, Iceberg. Iceberg has competed for several professional wrestling promotions, including Total Nonstop Action Wrestling (TNA), Ring Of Honor, World Wrestling Council and Wrestling International New Generations (W*ING) in Japan. He later wrestled as part of The Extreme Freebird Alliance. He was NWA Wildside Heavyweight Champion, NWA Wildside Tag Team Champion 3 times. He has also held the NWA Anarchy Heavyweight Championship and the NWA Anarchy Tag Team Championships 2 times.

== Professional wrestling career ==
Chastain was mentored by Abdullah the Butcher, who inspired him to use a fork as a foreign object during matches. Early in his career, Chastain faced and defeated such wrestlers as Mr. Pogo and Abdullah the Butcher. In TNA Wrestling, he was brought in by manager Don Callis to feuded with The Sandman. At TNA's fifty-third weekly pay-per-view event, Chastain defeated Norman Smiley. Chastain later lost a pay-per-view match against The Sandman. After the match, Callis ended his business arrangement with Chastain, putting on a rubber glove and then shaking his hand.

In 2003, he was one third of the alliance The Extreme Freebirds, with Tank and Ray Gordy.

After winning the NWA Anarchy Heavyweight Championship, he defended it against Mikael Judas and Phill Shatter at the NWA 60th Anniversary Show. In NWA in September 2009, he wrestled in a match which carried a stipulation that he would be forced to retire if he lost. Iceberg lost the match but then wrestled one final match under his real name, Edward Chastain, claiming that only the Iceberg character had to retire. During this match, he wore a dress shirt and tie, and the fans chanted "You're a legend!" after Chastain won the match.

== Championships and accomplishments ==
- Atlanta Wrestling Entertainment
  - AWE Tag Team Championship (1 time) - with Tank
- Continental Championship Wrestling

- CCW Heavyweight Championship (1 time)
- CCW Brass Knuckles Championship (2 time)

- Extreme Wrestling Alliance

- EWA Heavyweight Championship (1 time)
- EWA United States Championship (3 time)

- IWA-Deep South

- IWA-Deep South Tag Team Championship (1 time) - with Tank

- Pro Wrestling Evolution

- PWE World Heavyweight Championship (1 time)

- Peachstate Wrestling Alliance

- PWA Tag Team Championship (1 time) - with Rick Michaels

- National Wrestling Alliance

- NWA Southern Tag Team Championship (1 time) - with Luke Gallows

- National Wrestling Federation

- NWF Heavyweight Championship (1 time)

- Anarchy Wrestling

- NWA Anarchy Heavyweight Championship (1 time)
- NWA Anarchy Tag Team Championship (1 time) - with Slim J.

- NWA Wildside

- NWA Wildside Heavyweight Championship (1 time)
- NWA Wildside Tag Team Championship (2 times) - with Tank

- New Age Wrestling Alliance

- NEWA Hardcore Championship (1 time)

- Starsouth Championship Wrestling Alliance

- SCWA Georgia Heavyweight Championship (2 times)
- SCWA Heavyweight Championship (3 time)
- SCWA Tag Team Championship (4 times)– Tank

- Ultimate Extreme Wrestling

- UEW Tag Team Championship (1 time) – with Tank

- Wrestling International New Generations

- W*ING Hardcore Championship (2 time)
