= Onyx (wrestler) =

American professional wrestler

Personal information
- Born: Kyle McNeely Jamaica, Queens, New York, U.S.

Professional wrestling career
- Billed height: 5 ft 10 in (178 cm)
- Billed weight: 217 lb (98 kg)
- Billed from: Jamaica, Queens, New York
- Debut: 1998
- Retired: 2007

Kyle McNeely, better known by his ring name Onyx, is an American retired professional wrestler. He is best known for his appearances in Total Nonstop Action Wrestling (TNA) from 2003 to 2004.

== Early life ==
Born in Jamaica, Queens, New York, McNeely moved to Georgia, settling in Cornelia. He was educated at White County High School, before attending Western Carolina University. McNeely played for the Western Carolina Catamounts football team, where he was a three year starter from 1991 to 1993. After graduating, he attempted a career in the National Football League (NFL), but it was cut short due to two Achilles tears within separate training camps. McNeely would then begin a career in professional wrestling, debuting in 1998.

== Professional wrestling career ==
=== NWA Wildside (1999–2005) ===
Onyx debuted for the National Wrestling Alliance's Wildside territory in 1999. The following year, he won the vacant Junior Heavyweight Championship on May 20, 2000, after defeating Adam Jacobs in the finals of a tournament. Onyx would hold the title for just over five months before losing it to Lazz in a handicap match with Jeff G. Bailey as his partner.

On July 7, 2001, Onyx and his team lost to Prince Justice's team in a WarGames match for Justice's Heavyweight Championship. Despite the loss, Onyx managed to win the Television Championship from Adam Jacobs on October 20. On December 22, Onyx defeated Cru Jones in his first title defense. After successful title defenses against Sgt. Overkill and Iceberg, Onyx lost the TV Title to Jones on March 23, 2002. Onyx faced Jones in a rematch for title on May 3, but was unsuccessful in regaining the title.

After going undefeated in singles competition for a few months, Onyx began feuding with Iceberg over his Heavyweight Championship. On November 16, he defeated Iceberg via disqualification, but did not win the title due to championships being unable to change hands on a disqualification. On December 21, Onyx and Iceberg wrestled for the title, but the match ended in a double disqualification. Onyx received another rematch on March 15, 2003, but was again unable to defeat Iceberg for the title. After being unable to win the Heavyweight Championship, he turned his sights to the Television Championship and unsuccessfully wrestled Rainman for the title on May 3.

On October 25, 2003, Onyx finally won the Heavyweight Championship after defeating Shawn Hernandez. He then defended the title against the likes of Rudy Boy Gonzales, Chance Prophet and Abyss, before engaging in a feud with Ray Gordy, who he also defeated to retain the championship. Onyx would then lose the title to Jason Cross on September 4, 2004 to end his reign at 315 days, the longest single reign in the championship's entire history. After Gordy defeated Cross for the title on December 4, Onyx defeated Gordy on the same day to win his second Heavyweight Title, thus reigniting their feud. Onyx held the title for a few months before losing it to Rainman on March 26, 2005 in a three-way match also involving Gordy. One month later, Onyx defeated Rainman to win his third and final Heavyweight Championship on April 30. Wildside closed down immediately afterwards, resulting in Onyx becoming the shortest reigning Heavyweight Champion as a result.

=== World Wrestling Federation (2001–2002) ===
McNeely, under the ring name Onyx, wrestled for the World Wrestling Federation (WWF) on the February 10, 2001 episode of Jakked against Albert, which he lost. On the July 9 episode of Jakked, he lost to Haku. Onyx wrestled his third and final match on Metal on January 26, 2002, which he lost to Crash Holly.

=== NWA Total Nonstop Action (2003–2004) ===
McNeely, as Onyx, made his debut for Total Nonstop Action Wrestling (TNA) on the August 27, 2003 episode of Xplosion, where he and Matt Sydal lost to The Gathering (Julio Dinero and CM Punk). On June 14, 2004, Onyx was brought in by TNA as a member of The Elite Guard, and debuted as a member of the faction with Hotstuff Hernandez and Chad Collyer. They were brought in to help Jeff Jarrett in his feud against the 3Live Kru. Two days later, the two factions wrestled on the TNA weekly pay-per-view in a six-man tag team match, which the Kru won after Ron Killings pinned Hernandez. In order to even the odds, the Kru gained Ken Shamrock as an ally to feud with Jarrett and the Guard.

The Elite Guard earned their first victory on the July 3 episode of Xplosion after they defeated Mikal Adryan, Dirk Ciglar, and Austin Lane in a six-man tag team match. Four days later, Jarrett emerged victorious from a Running of the Gauntlet match that saw him outlast Shamrock, the Guard, and the 3Live Kru to retain the NWA World Heavyweight Championship after Shamrock turned on the Kru. On the July 9 episode of Impact!, the Guard finally got their revenge on the 3Live Kru by defeating them in a six-man tag team match.

The following week on the weekly TNA pay-per-view, Dusty Rhodes and Larry Zbyszko joined the Kru in defeating Jarrett, the Elite Guard, and Shamrock in a ten-man Guitar on a Pole match when Rhodes pinned Onyx. Onyx and Hernandez teamed up for the final time in a tag team match against A. J. Styles and Jeff Hardy on the September 3 episode of Impact!, but were defeated when Hardy pinned Onyx after a Swanton Bomb.

=== World Wrestling Entertainment (2003–2004) ===
He reappeared for the now-renamed World Wrestling Entertainment (WWE) on the March 1, 2004 episode of Sunday Night Heat, losing to Steven Richards. He made his final appearance for WWE on the March 2 episode of Velocity, where he and Mikal Adryan lost to The Full Blooded Italians (Chuck Palumbo and Johnny Stamboli).

=== NWA Anarchy (2005–2007) ===
After Wildside's closure, Onyx began wrestling in NWA Anarchy. While in Anarchy, Onyx competed for the territory's Heavyweight Championship on two occasions, but was unable win the title. In addition to wrestling singles matches, he also formed a tag team with Jeff Lewis, gained Jeff G. Bailey as their manager and collectively, they became known as the NWA Elite. The Elite would remain together until Onyx retired from professional wrestling in early 2007.

=== Combat Zone Wrestling (2006–2007) ===
Following a stint in Deep South Wrestling (DSW), one of World Wrestling Entertainment's former developmental territories, Onyx and former NWA Wildside rival Rainman debuted in Combat Zone Wrestling (CZW) on October 15, 2006 in a losing effort to The Kings of Wrestling (Chris Hero and Claudio Castagnoli) for the World Tag Team Championship. In December, Onyx and Rainman, now known as The Blackout, were unsuccessful in winning a tournament for the vacant World Tag Team Title. However, they did start a feud with CZW's own Blackout while both teams competed in the tournament, due to Onyx and Rainman accusing them of ruining the Blackout name. On December 9 at Cage of Death 8, Onyx and Rainman defeated the Blackout (Sabian and Robbie Merino) for the World Tag Team Championship. Onyx and Rainman would hold the title until January 13, 2007, before losing it back to the Blackout (Sabian and Ruckus). Onyx retired from professional wrestling in early 2007.

== Championships and accomplishments ==
- Combat Zone Wrestling
  - CZW World Tag Team Championship (1 time) – with Rainman
- NWA Wildside
  - NWA Wildside Heavyweight Championship (3 times)
  - NWA Wildside Junior Heavyweight Championship (1 time)
  - NWA Wildside Television Championship (1 time)
- Pro Wrestling Illustrated
  - PWI ranked him #235 of the top 500 singles wrestlers in the PWI 500 in 2002
