= Rukkus =

American professional wrestler (born 1970)

Personal information
- Born: R. Deon Walker; January 21, 1970 (age 56) Atlanta, Georgia

Professional wrestling career
- Ring name: Rukkus
- Billed height: 5 ft 10 in (1.78 m)
- Billed weight: 240 lb (110 kg)
- Trained by: Bull Buchanan; Bulldog Raines
- Debut: June 1994
- Retired: 2000

R. Deon Walker (born January 21, 1970), better known by his ring name, Rukkus, is an American professional wrestler. Though he has mainly appeared with NWA Wildside and Georgia Championship Wrestling, Rukkus has also competed for WWF in a dark match in May 2000. He also appeared in a host of indie shows throughout the US and UK.

== Career ==
R. Deon Walker was a professional wrestling fan from an early age, and while attending the U.S.N.A. he began training at Sammy Kent's Pro-Wrestling School. In June 1994, at twenty-four (24) Walker made his professional wrestling debut on television for Georgia Championship Wrestling as Dr. D.O.A., a wrestler and body guard for Manager Big Tex. Walker wrestled until May 2000, when he made a dark match appearance at the Georgia Dome against one of his trainers, Bull Buchanan.

== Championships and accomplishments ==
- Georgia Championship Wrestling
  - Georgia Championship Lightweight Championship (1 time)
- NWA Wildside
  - NWA Wildside Heavyweight Championship (1 time)
  - NWA Wildside Tag Team Championship (1 time)
