= Jason Cross =

American professional wrestler (born 1979)

Personal information
- Born: William Jason Massengale; June 13, 1979 (age 47) Macon, Georgia, U.S.

Professional wrestling career
- Ring name(s): Green Guy; Jason Cross
- Billed height: 6 ft 1 in (185 cm)
- Billed weight: 227 lb (103 kg)
- Billed from: Gainesville, Georgia
- Trained by: John Phoenix; Roger Ruffen
- Debut: 1998

William Jason Massengale (born June 13, 1979) is an American professional wrestler, better known by his ring name, Jason Cross. He is best known for his appearances with NWA Total Nonstop Action and NWA Wildside in the 2000s.

== Professional wrestling career ==
=== NWA Wildside (2002–2005) ===
After training under his childhood friend, mentor, and perpetual superior John Phoenix (alias John Couch), Massengale made his professional wrestling debut with a local promotion in 1998 at Walter B. Williams Gymnasium in Milledgeville, GA. Jason Cross later appeared in NWA Wildside in mid-2001 where he, Adam Jacobs, John Phoenix and Prince Justice defeated A.J. Styles, Onyx, Air Paris and Stone Mountain. Soon after his debut in Wildside, Cross became a heel and was managed by Jeff G. Bailey, Styles' former manager. Cross' gimmick was that of a "clone" of Styles, in which Cross copied him in every aspect, such as attire and wrestling moves. After David Young defeated Styles for the Heavyweight Title, Cross left Bailey and became a face before beginning a feud with Young over the championship. Three months later, he defeated Young for the championship on June 1, 2002. Cross held the title just under a month before losing it to Adam Jacobs. After losing to Jeremy V in a match for the vacant Television Championship on August 27, 2004, Cross began feuding with Onyx over the Heavyweight Championship after Onyx won the title. On September 4, 2004, Cross defeated Onyx for his second and final Heavyweight Championship. Cross held the title for exactly one month before losing it to Ray Gordy and remained within NWA Wildside until its closure in 2005.

=== NWA Total Nonstop Action (2002–2004) ===
In addition to wrestling for NWA Wildside, Cross also began competing for NWA Total Nonstop Action. On January 15, 2003, Massengale, under his Jason Cross ring name, suffered a broken hand and a crushed knuckle in a losing effort against David Young. However, he recovered soon afterwards and he began appearing regularly in TNA as a part of its X Division. On February 26, Cross wrestled then-X Division Champion Kid Kash in a match for the title, which Cross lost. After this, he wrestled in a few more matches sparingly throughout 2003. On August 11, 2004 at a weekly pay-per-view, Cross wrestled in a 22-man gauntlet match for the X Division Title, but was the sixth competitor eliminated as Petey Williams would go on to win the match and the title. He then wrestled in a few six-man tag team matches before competing in a 20-man gauntlet match at TNA's first-ever official pay-per-view event, Victory Road, which he lost.

=== Independent circuit (2005–2008, 2013) ===
After leaving TNA, Massengale began wrestling for various independent promotions in his home state of Georgia under his Jason Cross ring name, including Georgia Championship Wrestling, Dropkick Pro Wrestling, the Independent Wrestling Network and Rampage Pro Wrestling.

== Personal life ==
Massengale is married to Tara Lyn Tapley.

== Championships and accomplishments ==
- Georgia Championship Wrestling^{1}
  - GCW Heavyweight Championship (1 time)
  - GCW Tag Team Championship (1 time) – with John Bogey
  - GCW Television Championship (2 times)
  - GCW United States Junior Heavyweight Championship (3 times)
- New Alliance Wrestling
  - NAW Light Heavyweight Championship (1 time)
- NWA Wildside
  - NWA Wildside Heavyweight Championship (2 times)
- Northern Wrestling Federation
  - NWF Tri-State Championship (1 time)
  - NWF Tag Team Championship (1 time) – with Nick Rivers
- Pro Wrestling Illustrated
  - PWI ranked him #246 of the top 500 singles wrestlers in the PWI 500 in 2003

^{1}This Georgia-based promotion, which was eventually renamed Great Championship Wrestling, has no connection to the Georgia Championship Wrestling that was a prominent NWA affiliate until it was purchased by Jim Crockett Promotions in 1985.
