= El Mongol =

Raul Molina

Personal information
- Born: April 7, 1930 Mexico
- Died: October 9, 2016 (aged 86)

Professional wrestling career
- Ring name(s): El Mongol; Dr. M
- Billed weight: 105 kg (231 lb)
- Billed from: Mongolia; Lima, Peru
- Debut: 1951
- Retired: 1982

Raul Molina (April 7, 1930 – October 6, 2016) was a Mexican-born professional wrestler better known by his ring name of El Mongol. He was most famous in the Georgia territory during the late 1960s and early '70s.

== Professional wrestling career ==
Molina trained in martial arts and boxing as well as wrestling at a young age, but ultimately chose professional wrestling as an occupation. He got his start wrestling throughout Mexico and the United States, and by January 1966 he was in the Los Angeles-based Worldwide Wrestling Associates (WWA), where he captured the vacant World Tag Team Championship with partner Gorilla Monsoon. The duo held the belts for little more than two weeks, but El Mongol recaptured a share of the title on April 18, 1966, with partner Buddy Austin, holding the championship for a further two months.

By late 1966 El Mongol had moved on to Georgia Championship Wrestling (GCW), where he had his most lasting success. Under the tutelage of dapper manager Dandy Jack Crawford, El Mongol quickly became one of the promotion's top heels. Another gimmick in a long line of villainous Asian wrestling characters, El Mongol was a rulebreaking Mongol trained in martial arts, who punished opponents with karate-style chops and kicks. Molina completed the character's intimidating visual appearance with a Fu Manchu moustache, queue hairstyle and bare feet. The "Mongolian heel" gimmick was later used by other wrestlers, Killer Khan or The Mongolian Stomper probably the best known of them.

On February 24, 1967, El Mongol won the Georgia Heavyweight Title for the first time, defeating Buddy Fuller. He lost it after a month to Nick Kozak, but took it back three weeks later. On April 28 El Mongol lost it back again to Fuller, but claimed the title for a third time on June 16. This reign lasted two months before he traded the belt with Mr. Wrestling and then Bobby Shane, making El Mongol a five-time champion in the space of one calendar year.

In December 1967, El Mongol was suspended by GCW promoter Paul Jones for getting himself disqualified too often so he could retain the title. So for the first two months of 1968 the suspended El Mongol disappeared, at the same time as a mysterious masked wrestler known as "Dr. M" competed in the GCW. The widely held suspicion that Dr. M. was in fact El Mongol was confirmed after he lost a mask vs. mask match to Mr. Wrestling on February 27. Mr. Wrestling then defeated El Mongol again on April 12 to become GCW's undisputed Heavyweight Champion.

El Mongol feuded with the Torres brothers throughout this time, and won the Southern Tag Team titles with partner Hans Schmidt from Enrique and Alberto Torres on April 26 before trading them back a month later. He also won the Atlanta version of the NWA Texas Brass Knuckles Championship from Louie Tillet on June 29, though the Atlanta lineage is not officially recognized.

On July 6, 1968, El Mongol was partnered with stablemate Tarzan Tyler in a tag match against the Torres brothers. After losing the match, Tyler and Crawford attacked El Mongol, blaming him for the loss. El Mongol switched to a face as he feuded with his former manager Crawford and his stable.

The feud only lasted a few weeks as El Mongol soon departed under the pretense that Crawford had sold El Mongol's contract to a Peruvian company. He returned to the Los Angeles territory and wrestled there from August–December 1968. Again a heel, El Mongol became WWA's last Heavyweight Champion before WWA merged with the NWA. Upon going back to the GCW in January 1969 and resuming his feud with Crawford's stable, El Mongol was now billed as hailing from Lima, Peru.

On February 7, 1969, El Mongol won the Heavyweight Title a sixth time, defeating Dale Lewis. After reaffirming his undisputed claim to the title following a controversial finish against Assassin #1, he dropped the belt to The Professional on May 16. He won tag gold again with The Professional on June 27 but they lost the belts two weeks later. El Mongol departed the GCW for the second time after losing in a six-man tag team match on July 18 that carried the stipulation that the wrestler who lost the fall would have to leave the promotion.

El Mongol wrestled in the Tampa region during the second half of 1969 before returning to the GCW for a third stint starting in January 1970. He quickly re-entered the title picture and defeated Nick Bockwinkel for the Television Championship on March 7 before losing it back two weeks later. On April 3 he re-teamed with The Professional to once again briefly hold tag team gold. In October and November 1970 he teamed with Bobo Brazil in tag matches that were historically significant for their interracial composition: their success increased the confidence of Atlanta-region promoters to book more interracial matches in the future without fear of crowd problems.

El Mongol held the GCW Heavyweight Title twice more during 1971 and 1972, for a total of eight reigns over five years. He moved on to Ann Gunkel's short-lived All South Wrestling Alliance (ASWA), where he co-held another Tag Team Championship with Ray Candy in 1973. El Mongol proceeded to wrestle for another decade, briefly holding the AWA Southern Tag Team belts with Killer Karl Krupp during the summer of 1980 as a heel once again. He also made an appearance in the 1981 film Sharky's Machine playing a chauffeur/bodyguard.

Raul Molina retired from wrestling in 1982. At the peak of his popularity, Molina and wife Maria opened a restaurant aptly named Maria’s Mexican Restaurant in 1970 in the Georgia Motel in Doraville GA. Naturally, many of the area’s wrestlers would frequent the establishment, which became a meeting place for fans and grapplers alike. The Molinas expanded the operation to a larger site in downtown Atlanta six years later when business picked up due to his dad’s popularity and the great food served there. A second business was opened in nearby Griffin two years later. Mongol operated the Griffin eatery, while Maria ran the Atlanta restaurant. Both did all the cooking. They sold the business sometime around the year 2000 and went into retirement. They had five children together.

Raul Molina died on October 9, 2016, at the age of 86.

== Championships and accomplishments ==
- All-South Wrestling Alliance
  - Georgia Tag Team Championship (1 time) - with Ray Candy
- Continental Wrestling Association
  - AWA Southern Tag Team Championship (1 time) - with Killer Karl Krupp
- Southwest Sports, Inc. / NWA Big Time Wrestling
  - NWA Brass Knuckles Championship (Texas version) (1 time)
- Mid-South Sports
  - NWA Georgia Heavyweight Championship (8 times)
  - NWA Georgia Tag Team Championship (1 time) - with The Professional
  - NWA Georgia Television Championship (1 time)
  - NWA Macon Tag Team Championship (2 times) - with Joe Scarpa (1) and Bob Armstrong (1)
  - NWA Southeastern Tag Team Championship (Georgia version) (1 time) - with Bob Armstrong
  - NWA Southern Tag Team Championship (Georgia version) (1 time) - with Hans Schmidt
- Worldwide Wrestling Associates
  - WWA World Heavyweight Championship (1 time)
  - WWA World Tag Team Championship (2 times) - with Gorilla Monsoon (1) and Buddy Austin (1)
