= Austin Idol =

American professional wrestler

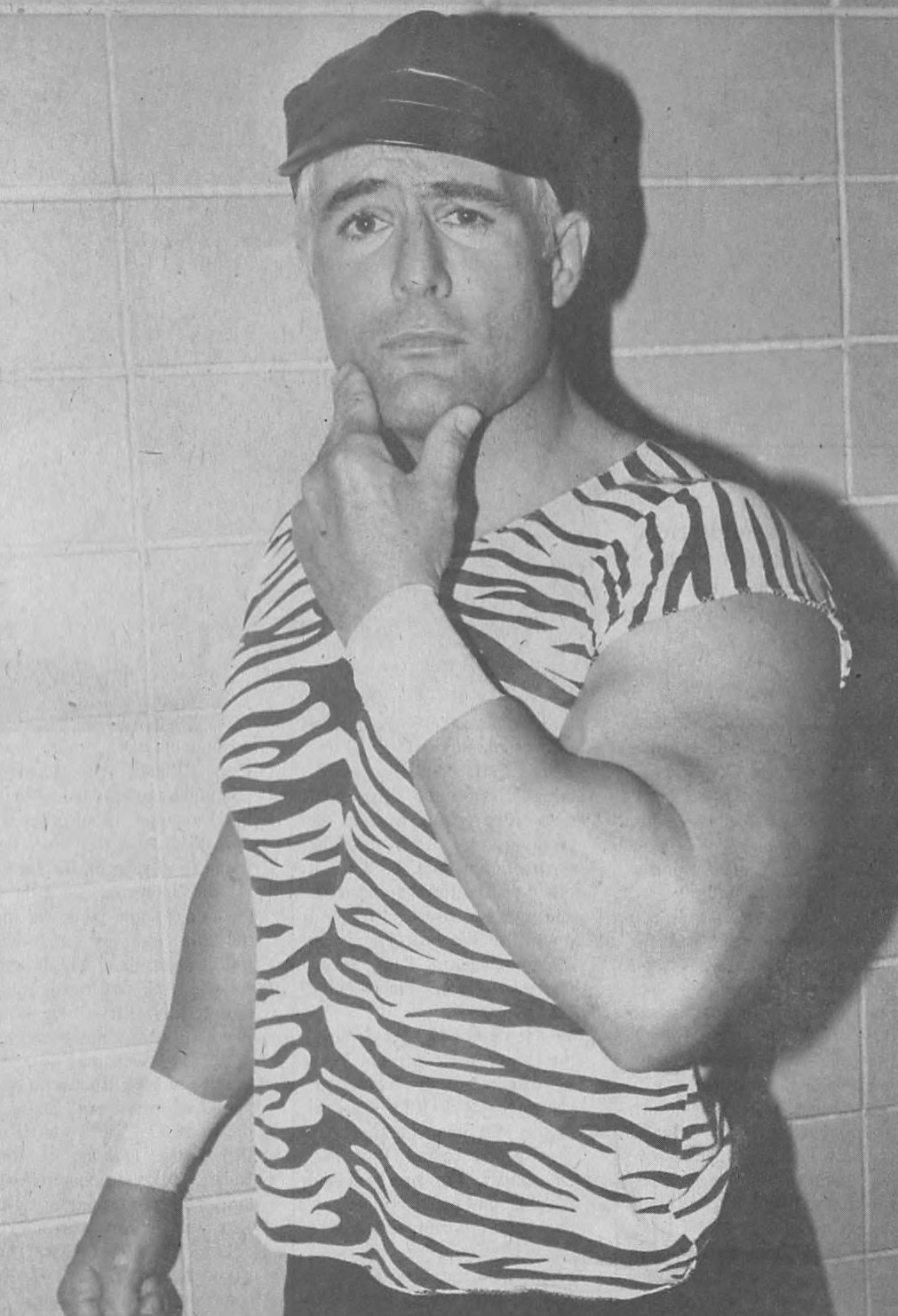
- Idol, circa 1984

Personal information
- Born: Michael McCord; October 26, 1949 (age 77) Tampa, Florida, U.S.
- Website: www.austinidollive.com

Professional wrestling career
- Ring name(s): Austin Idol; Black Diamond; Dennis McCord; Mike McCord; Often Idle; Super A The Super Texan
- Billed height: 6 ft 2 in (188 cm)
- Billed weight: 242 lb (110 kg)
- Billed from: Las Vegas, Nevada
- Trained by: Eddie Graham; Mike Graham
- Debut: 1972
- Retired: 1994

Michael McCord (born October 26, 1949) is an American retired professional wrestler and current Manager in the National Wrestling Alliance (NWA), better known by the ring name Austin Idol. He is best known for his appearances in the Mid-South with the Continental Wrestling Association (CWA), in particular his recurring feud with Jerry Lawler.

== Early life ==
McCord grew up in Tampa, Florida, where he attended Robinson High School. After graduating in 1966, he worked in construction. After developing an interest in becoming a professional wrestler, he eventually persuaded Mike Graham, the son of Eddie Graham (promoter of Championship Wrestling from Florida), to train him.

== Professional wrestling career ==
=== Early career (1972–1973) ===
McCord spent a year training to wrestle under Eddie and Mike Graham; during his training, he was stretched by Bob Roop, Hiro Matsuda, and Jack Brisco. He initially worked for Graham's Championship Wrestling from Florida promotion as a referee before debuting as a wrestler in early 1972 under the ring name Dennis McCord. McCord wrestled in Florida until mid-1972, then briefly for Nick Gulas' NWA Mid-America promotion in Alabama before joining the Carolinas-based Jim Crockett Promotions. In late 1972 and early 1973, McCord appeared in Sydney, Australia with World Championship Wrestling, where he and Jimmy Golden won a tournament to become the inaugural NWA Austra-Asian Tag Team Champions (they forfeited the titles in January 1973).

=== World Wide Wrestling Federation (1973–1974) ===
In March 1973, McCord joined Vincent J. McMahon's northeastern United States-based World Wide Wrestling Federation, where he adopted the new persona of "Iron" Mike McCord and was given Lou Albano as his manager. In July 1973, McCord faced Chief Jay Strongbow in a memorable match in Madison Square Garden in New York City. As Strongbow applied a sleeper hold to McCord, Albano interfered by smashing a cast on Strongbow's forehead; McCord was disqualified, but Strongbow was cut wide open by Albano's blows. During his stint in the WWWF, McCord wrestled primarily in the mid-card, although he (unsuccessfully) challenged Pedro Morales for the WWWF Championship on several occasions. McCord remained with the WWWF until January 1974, when he left for Florida due to disliking the colder weather in the northeast.

=== Florida and Georgia; plane crash (1974–1975, 1977) ===
Upon returning to Florida in January 1974, McCord resumed wrestling for Championship Wrestling from Florida, this time as "The Super Texan", a masked heel allied with Dusty Rhodes. McCord was unmasked in March 1974 after losing a "mask versus beard match" to Jos LeDuc. In summer 1974, McCord began wrestling for Georgia Championship Wrestling as Mike McCord. He competed in Georgia until losing a loser leaves town match to Harley Race in November 1974, returning to Florida later that month.

On February 20, 1975, McCord and wrestlers Gary Hart and Bobby Shane were passengers on a Cessna 182 Skylane piloted by wrestler Buddy Colt between Miami and Tampa. While attempting to land at Peter O. Knight Airport in foggy conditions, Colt crashed into Tampa Bay. Shane was killed in the crash and the other wrestlers injured, with McCord sustaining two broken ankles, several broken ribs, and severe lacerations to his feet. McCord was inactive for several months while rehabilitating. Later that year, McCord wrestled a handful of matches for Georgia Championship Wrestling, some of them as the masked "Super A" - briefly holding the NWA Georgia Heavyweight Championship - before going on hiatus for the next two years. Following the accident, McCord reportedly developed a fear of flying, which led him to largely restrict his future wrestling career to the Mid-South. His return from injury led Pro Wrestling Illustrated to name him its "Most Inspirational Wrestler of the Year" for 1975.

In July 1977, McCord wrestled a handful of matches for Championship Wrestling from Florida before once again going on hiatus. By this point, McCord's weight had increased to 300 lbs.

=== Texas, Tennessee, and Alabama (1978–1979) ===
McCord re-emerged in March 1978 in Fritz Von Erich's Texas-based NWA Big Time Wrestling promotion under the new persona of "the Universal Heartthrob" Austin Idol. As part of his new character, McCord lost considerable weight, developed a more muscular physique, and bleached his hair blonde. Over the next two months, Idol competed in NWA Big Time Wrestling and Paul Boesch's Houston Wrestling (where he was briefly billed as "Often Idle"). In May 1978, he unsuccessfully challenged Dale Valentine for the NWA Texas Heavyweight Championship. He left Texas later that month after losing a loser leaves town match to Kevin Von Erich.

Idol made a handful of appearances for Pacific Northwest Wrestling in Portland, Oregon and for Big Time Wrestling in Detroit, Michigan before joining the Memphis, Tennessee-based Continental Wrestling Association in December 1978. Idol was immediately booked as a main event star in the CWA. Shortly after debuting, Idol defeated Jerry Lawler for the AWA Southern Heavyweight Championship. He held the title until January 1979, when he lost to Ron Fuller. Over the following months, Idol feuded with Lawler (and his allies Bill Dundee and Jackie Fargo) until losing a hair versus loser leaves town steel cage match to Lawler in April 1979.

In May 1979, Idol began appearing with Southeastern Championship Wrestling in Alabama, briefly holding the NWA Southeastern Heavyweight Championship (Southern Division). He left the promotion in summer 1979 to return to Georgia Championship Wrestling.

=== Georgia (1979–1980) ===
Idol returned to Georgia Championship Wrestling in summer 1979. In November 1979, he and The Masked Superstar won a one-night tournament in the Omni Coliseum in Atlanta, Georgia for the NWA Georgia Tag Team Championship. They lost the titles to Jack Brisco and Jerry Brisco later that month. In December 1979, Idol defeated Ray Candy for the NWA Georgia Television Championship. In January 1980, Idol was named the inaugural NWA National Heavyweight Champion (the title was vacated later that year in unclear circumstances). Idol's reign as NWA Georgia Television Champion lasted until January 1980, when he lost to Steve Travis. Idol regained the title from Travis several days later, but lost it to Travis' ally Kevin Sullivan later that month. Idol defeated Sullivan to win the title for a third time in February 1980, but lost it to Tommy Rich two days later. In February 1980, Idol lost to Sullivan in a "Boston street fight". Later that month, he defeated Sullivan in a strap match. In March 1980, Idol defeated Mr. Wrestling II to win the NWA Georgia Heavyweight Championship for a second time. He held the title until June 1980, when he lost to Baron von Raschke. During his reign, he unsuccessfully challenged visiting NWA World Heavyweight Champion Harley Race. Idol left Georgia Championship Wrestling in July 1980, briefly returning to the Continental Wrestling Association before embarking on a tour of Japan.

=== All Japan Pro Wrestling (1980) ===
In August and September 1980, Idol made his first appearances in Japan with the All Japan Pro Wrestling promotion as part of its "Summer Action Series II" tour. He teamed with Ray Candy to compete in the PWF Cup Tag Team Tournament, defeating Atsushi Onita and Prince Tonga in the quarter-finals before losing to The Cruiser and The Destroyer in the semi-finals. Idol's other opponents during the tour included Giant Baba, Jumbo Tsuruta, Mil Mascaras, and Rocky Hata.

=== Georgia and Tennessee (1980–1981) ===
Following his tour of Japan, Idol began appearing for both Georgia Championship Wrestling in Georgia and the Continental Wrestling Association in Tennessee. In August 1980, Idol and Dutch Mantell won the CWA World Tag Team Championship. In October 1980, Idol defeated Billy Robinson to win the CWA World Heavyweight Championship; he lost the title to Bobby Eaton later that month. In Georgia, Idol formed a tag team with his former enemy Kevin Sullivan, with the duo feuding with the Fabulous Freebirds.

In January 1981, Idol reignited his feud with Jerry Lawler in the Continental Wrestling Association. Idol was presented as one of a series of "bounty hunters" brought into the territory by Lawler's enemy Jimmy Hart to try and defeat Lawler, who had recently returned after rehabilitating a broken leg. During a bout between the two men, Lawler threw a fireball at Idol while trapped in his Las Vegas Leglock, supposedly burning Idol's neck. Idol made his return in a memorable angle in which ring announcer Lance Russell announced that he had received a telegram from Mexican promoter Salvador Lutteroth announcing that Lawler had been voted the most popular wrestler in Mexico City, with the masked luchador "Black Diamond" to present Lawler with a plaque; during the ceremony, Black Diamond broke the plaque over Lawler's head, then unmasked to reveal himself as Idol. In March 1981, Idol and Mantell lost the CWA World Tag Team Championship to Bill Dundee and Tommy Rich. Idol left the CWA once more the following month.

=== Jim Crockett Promotions (1981–1982) ===
In May 1981, Idol began wrestling for the Carolinas-based Jim Crockett Promotions as a heel, facing opponents such as Johnny Weaver, The Masked Superstar, Ricky Steamboat, and Wahoo McDaniel. During his time in Jim Crockett Promotions, an angle saw Idol bring an 8 mm film camera to ringside and record other wrestlers' matches, angering them. Idol left Jim Crockett Promotions in March 1982.

=== Alabama, Tennessee, and Texas (1982–1987) ===
In mid-1982, Idol resumed wrestling for Southeastern Championship Wrestling in Birmingham, Alabama. He became the NWA Alabama Heavyweight Champion in unclear circumstances, losing the title to Wayne Ferris in September 1982. In December 1982, he won the NWA Southeastern Heavyweight Championship (Northern Division), with his reign ending in unclear circumstances. In December 1982, Idol wrestled visiting NWA World Heavyweight Champion Ric Flair to a draw. Idol faced Flair again in May 1983 but failed to win the title.

Idol returned to Continental Wrestling Association in February 1983; upon arrival, he was named the inaugural AWA International Heavyweight Champion. He lost the title to Lawler the following month, with Lawler once again hitting him with a fireball. In summer 1983, Idol turned face and formed an alliance with Lawler. In August 1983, Lawler and Idol won the CWA World Tag Team Championship from The Assassins, only for The Assassins to regain the title one week later. In September 1983, Idol defeated Ken Patera to become AWA International Heavyweight Champion for a second time, only to lose the title to Stan Hansen two days later. Idol regained the title from Hansen in October in a bullrope match. In November 1983, Idol and Dutch Mantell defeated The Midnight Express for the CWA World Tag Team Championship; the title was later quietly abandoned. Idol's third reign as AWA International Heavyweight Champion lasted until April 1984, when he lost to Randy Savage. Idol regained the title from Savage in May, only to lose it to Masao Ito in June 1984. Idol left the CWA once again in mid-1984.

In July 1984, Idol returned to Southeastern Championship Wrestling in Alabama. In August 1984, he defeated Vic Rain to win the NWA Southeastern Heavyweight Championship (Northern Division) for a second time. He held the title until November 1984, when he lost to Jimmy Golden. In March 1985, Idol defeated Lord Humongous for the NWA Alabama Heavyweight Championship, losing the title back to Humongous the following month. In July 1985, Idol defeated Jimmy Golden to regain the NWA Southeastern Heavyweight Championship (Northern Division); his third reign ended the following month when he lost to Adrian Street. Idol left Southeastern Championship Wrestling once more later that month.

Idol returned to the Continental Wrestling Association in August 1985, teaming with Jerry Lawler in a short feud with the Fabulous Freebirds. In December 1985, he and Lawler defeated Bill Dundee and Dutch Mantel to win the AWA Southern Tag Team Championship. The title was vacated later that month when Lawler lost a loser leaves town match to Dundee, and Idol left the Continental Wrestling Association once again. In early 1986, Idol appeared in Texas with World Class Championship Wrestling and Texas All-Star Wrestling. In January 1986, Idol defeated Big Bubba in Ponce, Puerto Rico to win the Texas All-Star Wrestling USA Heavyweight Championship; he held the title until April 1986, when he was defeated by Al Madril in Pasadena, Texas.

Idol returned to the Continental Wrestling Association yet again in June 1986. In January 1987, he turned on Jerry Lawler, beginning what was regarded as "the most memorable series of their feud". In early 1987, Idol acquired Paul E. Dangerously as his manager. In February 1987, Idol won a tournament to become the new AWA Southern Heavyweight Champion, defeating Soul Train Jones in the tournament final. His reign lasted until April 1987 when Lawler defeated him in a chain match. One week later, Idol challenged Lawler for the title in a hair versus hair cage match. Idol defeated Lawler to regain the title after his ally Tommy Rich (This was the first incarnation of the Dangerous Alliance: Paul E Dangerously, Austin Idol, and Tommy Rich)- who hid underneath the ring for the entirety of the event - emerged to assist him, Following the match, Idol and Rich beat down Lawler and shaved his head, enraging the Mid-South Coliseum audience. Idol's third reign as AWA Southern Heavyweight Champion ended in June 1987 when he was once again defeated by Lawler. One week later, Idol and Rich lost to Lawler and Dundee in a scaffold match. Following this, Idol left the Continental Wrestling Association for a tour of Japan. The feud between Idol/Rich and Lawler was named "Feud of the Year" for 1987 by the Wrestling Observer Newsletter.

=== All Japan Pro Wrestling (1987, 1988) ===
Idol toured Japan with All Japan Pro Wrestling for a second time in August and September 1987 as part of its "Summer Action Series II". Upon arriving in AJPW, Idol and Stan Hansen were awarded the vacant PWF World Tag Team Championship. They successfully defended the titles in bouts against teams such as Hiroshi Wajima and Takashi Ishikawa and Jumbo Tsuruta and Tiger Mask before losing to Ashura Hara and Genichiro Tenryu on September 3. Throughout the remainder of the tour, Idol primarily competed in six-man tag team matches alongside Hansen and Joel Deaton.

Idol had a third stint in Japan with AJPW in March and April 1988 as part of its Champion Carnival tour. For the bulk of the tour, Idol teamed with Tommy Rich, with the duo facing wrestlers such as The Great Kabuki, John Tenta, Shunji Takano, and Takashi Ishikawa.

=== Late career (1988–1998) ===
Following his third stint in Japan, Idol began wrestling less frequently. In summer 1988, he appeared with the Continental Wrestling Association in Memphis, Tennessee - where he once again faced Jerry Lawler - and the Continental Wrestling Federation in Jackson, Mississippi. In 1989, he made a handful of appearances with the United States Wrestling Association (USWA) (the successor to the Continental Wrestling Association), both wrestling against and teaming with Lawler. Throughout 1990, Idol appeared with the USWA and with the Philadelphia, Pennsylvania-based Tri-State Wrestling Alliance. In October 1990, he competed in a one-night tournament for the vacant USWA Unified World Heavyweight Championship, losing to Lawler in the final bout of the tournament. In 1991, Idol made a handful of appearances with the Tri-State Wrestling Alliance and the Dallas, Texas-based Global Wrestling Federation. Idol wrestled very few matches over the following years. In 1993, he briefly ran his own promotion in Alabama. Idol formally retired in 1998 after appearing on the debut television episode of the Memphis, Tennessee-based Power Pro Wrestling promotion.

=== Retirement; various endeavours (1998–present) ===
After retiring, Idol went on to work as a real estate investor.

In August 2011, Idol broke his retirement for one night to wrestle a five-way match on the Juggalo Championship Wrestling pay-per-view "Legends & Icons" in Cave-In-Rock, Illinois, defeating Brickhouse Brown, Doug Gilbert, Dutch Mantel, and Koko B. Ware.

In November 2012, Idol launched the Austin Idol Rock & Roll Wrestling Show on American Hearts Radio. In 2017, after appearing on Jim Cornette's podcast, The Jim Cornette Experience, Idol began hosting his own podcast, Austin Idol Live. Idol discontinued the podcast after 31 weekly broadcasts.

In 2017 and 2018, Idol appeared alongside Nick Aldis as his manager.

On January 8, 2020, Idol made a guest appearance on All Elite Wrestling's AEW Dark webcast as part of a commemoration of Memphis wrestling.

In 2020, Idol established the Universal Wrestling College professional wrestling school in Greenville, South Carolina.

In 2021, Idol's likeness was featured as a playable character in the RetroMania Wrestling video game on Steam, Nintendo Switch, PS4, and Xbox One.

In 2021, Idol founded the stable "Idolmania Sports Management" - consisting of Jordan Clearwater, Marshe Rocket, BLK Jeez, and Tyrus - in the National Wrestling Alliance. The stable later expanded with the masked Cyon, who was portrayed as being Idol's son. Tyrus won the NWA World Television Championship on the August 6, 2021 episode of NWA Powerrr. In November 2022 at NWA Hard Times 3, Tyrus relinquished the NWA World Television Championship to challenge for the NWA Worlds Heavyweight Championship, defeating champion Trevor Murdoch in a triple threat match. Stablemate Jordon Clearwater also won the World Television Championship at NWA Hard Times 3 by pinning A.J. Cazana. Cyon with his "father" at his side won the NWA National Heavyweight Championship at the NWA 74th Anniversary Show in August 2022. From November 13, 2022, until February 14, 2023 (when Clearwater lost the World Television Championship to Thom Latimer), Idolmania Sports Management held every singles championship except the NWA Junior Heavyweight Championship.

== Legacy ==
Fellow wrestler Jerry Lawler noted Idol's promo skills and impressive looks and physique. Professional wrestling manager and referee Scott Bowden described Idol as "a marginal worker... somewhat limited" but with "an excellent grasp of psychology" and being "great on the stick". Writing in 1986, journalist Dave Meltzer noted that Idol was "not considered a strong worker" but that he "got over on his looks and his arrogant interviews, both as a heel and a babyface" and had "a good physique".

Idol did not enjoy the colder weather of the north and, following his plane crash, also reportedly disliked flying; as a result, Idol primarily restricted himself to the Mid-South rather than becoming a national star. In 2014, WWE named Idol as one of "the 10 best wrestlers you've never heard of".

In an interview on The Joe Rogan Experience podcast in 2023, Hulk Hogan credited getting the idea to cup his hand next to his ear to get a crowd reaction after seeing Idol do it, and the reaction he got. He also credited getting the idea for the term "Hulkamania" after hearing Idol use the term "Idolmania".

== Professional wrestling style and persona ==
At the beginning of his career, McCord portrayed a powerlifter. In 1978, he adopted the new character of Austin Idol, a verbose bleach blonde braggart who called himself "the Universal Heartthrob" and fancied himself attractive to women and wore tie-dyed ring attire. At the beginning of his matches, Idol would often make a show of removing his robe by quickly outstretching his arms in a crucifix position to reveal his physique, and would swivel his hips from side to side while slowly continuing to disrobe. The character of Austin Idol was often compared to "Superstar" Billy Graham.

Idol's finishing move was the Las Vegas Leglock (a figure-four leglock). His signature moves included the piledriver, elbow smash, knee drop, and sleeper hold.

== Championships and accomplishments ==
- All Japan Pro Wrestling
  - PWF World Tag Team Championship (1 time) - with Stan Hansen
- Continental Wrestling Association
  - AWA Southern Heavyweight Championship (3 times)
  - AWA Southern Tag Team Championship (1 time) - with Jerry Lawler
  - CWA International Heavyweight Championship (4 times)
  - CWA World Heavyweight Championship (1 time)
  - CWA World Tag Team Championship (3 times) - with Dutch Mantel (2) and Jerry Lawler (1)
- Georgia Championship Wrestling
  - NWA Georgia Heavyweight Championship (1 time)
  - NWA Georgia Tag Team Championship (1 time) - with Masked Superstar
  - NWA Georgia Television Championship (3 times)
  - NWA National Heavyweight Championship (1 time, inaugural)
- Pro Wrestling Illustrated
  - PWI Most Inspirational Wrestler of the Year (1975)
  - PWI ranked him # 193 of the 500 best singles wrestlers during the PWI Years in 2003.
- Southeastern Championship Wrestling
  - NWA Alabama Heavyweight Championship (2 times)
  - NWA Southeastern Heavyweight Championship (Northern Division) (3 times)
  - NWA Southeastern Heavyweight Championship (Southern Division) (1 time)
- Texas All-Star Wrestling
  - TAW USA Heavyweight Championship (1 time)
- World Championship Wrestling
  - NWA Austra-Asian Tag Team Championship (1 time) - with Jimmy Golden
- Wrestling Observer Newsletter
  - Feud of the Year (1987) with Tommy Rich vs. Jerry Lawler
