= NWA Georgia Junior Heavyweight Championship =

Professional wrestling championship

Details
- Promotion: National Wrestling Alliance
- Date established: 1975
- Date retired: August 2017
Statistics
- First champion: Bob Orton Jr.
- Final champion: Stunt Marshall
- Most reigns: Air Paris, Jeremy Lopez, Jimmy Rave, Slim J., Kevin Sullivan and J.C. Dazz (2 reigns)
- Longest reign: Fast Eddie (455 days)
- Shortest reign: Koonce (1 day)

The NWA Georgia Junior Heavyweight Championship was a championship in the NWA's Georgia Championship Wrestling promotion. It was strictly for the junior heavyweight wrestlers.

== Title history ==
Wrestler:	Times:	Date:	Location:	Notes:
Bob Orton, Jr.	1	April 1975		
The title is vacated in April 8, 1980.
Kevin Sullivan	1	June 8, 1980	Atlanta, Georgia	Defeated Dutch Mantel in a tournament for the vacant title.
Stan Lane	1	September 3, 1980	Columbus, Georgia	
Kevin Sullivan	2	January 1981		
Dutch Mantell	1	1981		
Record Unrecorded.
Steve Olsonoski	1	1981		
Record Unrecorded.
George South	1	1986		
The title is inactive.
Air Paris	1	May 13, 1999	Loganville, Georgia	Defeats Bart Sawyer in the tournament final for the reactivated title.
Title stripped on October 28, 1999 for failure to defend in 30 days with injury.
Andy Anderson	1	October 28, 1999	Loganville, Georgia	Defeats Dusty Dotson for the vacant title.
Air Paris	2	November 4, 1999	Gainesville, Georgia	
Title stripped in May 2000.
Onyx	1	May 20, 2000	Cornelia, Georgia	Defeats Adam Jacobs in a tournament final.
Lazz	1	October 21, 2000	Cornelia, Georgia	Defeats Onyx and Jeff G. Bailey in a handicap match.
Caprice Coleman	1	December 2, 2000	Cornelia, Georgia	
J.C. Dazz	1	March 24, 2001	Cornelia, Georgia	
Jimmy Rave	1	April 21, 2001	Cornelia, Georgia	Defeats Dazz and Caprice Coleman in a 3-way match.
J.C. Dazz	2	September 29, 2001	Cornelia, Georgia	
Title held up after a match against A.J. Styles on October 6, 2001 in Cornelia, Georgia.
Jimmy Rave	2	October 19, 2001	Cornelia, Georgia	Defeats A.J. Styles, Jason Cross and J.C. Dazz.
Jeremy Lopez	1	November 3, 2001	Cornelia, Georgia	
Todd Sexton	1	April 20, 2002	Cornelia, Georgia	Defeats Lopez and Jimmy Rave in a 3-way match.
Jeremy Lopez	2	May 4, 2002	Cornelia, Georgia	
Slim J.	1	October 19, 2002	Cornelia, Georgia	
Salvatore Rinauro	1	March 1, 2003	Cornelia, Georgia	
Seth Delay	1	July 5, 2003	Cornelia, Georgia	
Ray Gordy	1	September 6, 2003	Cornelia, Georgia	Defeats Altar Boy Luke, Delirious, Matt Sydal, Salvatore Rinauro and Seth Delay in a 5-men one night tournament.
Title stripped on December 6, 2003 for failure to defend the title within 30 days.
Fast Eddie	1	December 27, 2003	Cornelia, Georgia	Wins an 8-man gauntlet match defeating Nick Halen, Rinauro, Jay Fury, Ray Gordy, Matt Sydal, Delirious and Seth Delay.
Slim J.	2	March 26, 2005	Cornelia, Georgia	Defeats Eddie and Jay Fury in a 3-way match unified with NWA Anarchy Television Title on June 4, 2005 when Jeff Lewis defeats Slim J. in 4-man tournament final to unify Georgia Junior Heavyweight and NWA Wildside Television titles.
Elix Skipper	1	April 2, 2005	Columbus, Georgia	
The title is deactivated by the NWA on April 30, 2005.
Koonce	1	October 25, 2014	Griffin, Georgia	Defeats Marko in tournament to be recognized by NWA Atlanta.
Fry Daddy	1	October 25, 2014	Griffin, Georgia	
Michael Stevens	1	July 25, 2015	Locust Grove, Georgia	
Kevin Blue	1	September 12, 2015	Locust Grove, Georgia	
The title is vacated in November 2016.
Stunt Marshall	1	December 2016		
The title is deactivated in August 25, 2017.
