= Ax (wrestler) =

American professional wrestler (born 1947)

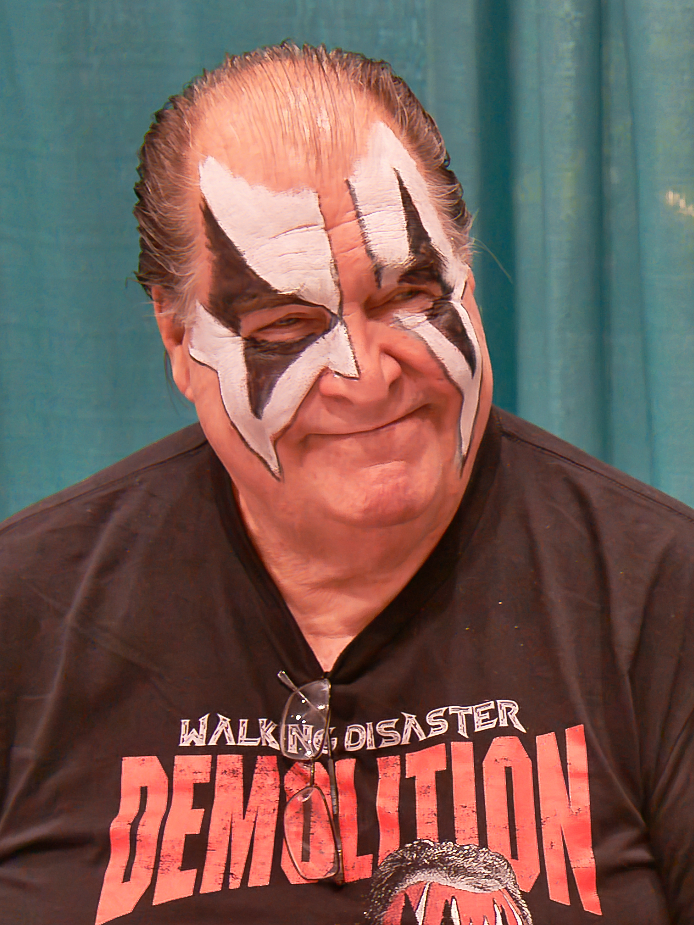
- Eadie in 2024

Personal information
- Born: William Reid Eadie; December 27, 1947 (age 78) Brownsville, Pennsylvania, U.S.
- Education: West Virginia University
- Spouse: Sue Eadie
- Children: 2

Professional wrestling career
- Ring names: Ax; Ax Demolition; Axis the Demolisher; Bill Eadie; Billy Crusher; Bolo; Bolo Mongol; Demolition Ax; International Superstar; Masked Destroyer; Masked Superstar; Masked Superstar #1; The Paramedic; Super Machine; Superstar
- Billed height: 6 ft 3 in (191 cm)
- Billed weight: 291 lb (132 kg)
- Billed from: Mongolia (as Bolo Mongol) "Parts unknown" (as Ax)
- Trained by: Boris Malenko; Geto Mongol
- Debut: December 15, 1972
- Retired: August 12, 2017

William Reid Eadie (born December 27, 1947) is an American retired professional wrestler, best known for performing under the ring names The Masked Superstar and Ax, the latter as part of Demolition.

He is a former three-time WWF World Tag Team Championships as part of Demolition, including a record 478-day reign during their first title run. He is also a two time IWA World Tag Team Champion with Geeto Mongol. Individually he held the NWA Television Championship, NWA American Heavyweight Championship and was a three-time NWA National Heavyweight Champion. He was inducted into the Professional Wrestling Hall of Fame in 2014 as The Masked Superstar, and was later inducted into the New England Pro Wrestling Hall of Fame in 2020 along with fellow Demolition partner Smash.

In March 2026, The Undertaker announced that Demolition would be inducted into the WWE Hall of Fame Class of 2026, with Ax and Smash as the inducted members.

== Early life ==
Eadie was born in Brownsville, Pennsylvania in 1947. He attended Brownsville High School, where he competed in gridiron football and track. After graduating high school in 1964, he attended West Virginia University on a track scholarship and received a degree in physical education in 1968. He the worked as a high school teacher and football coach, first at East Liverpool High School in East Liverpool, Ohio, and then spent 5 years at Cambridge High School in Cambridge, Ohio, before beginning his wrestling career.

== Professional wrestling career ==
=== Early career (1972–1976) ===
While attending a wrestling event in the early-1970s, Eadie met professional wrestler Geto Mongol, who invited him to train as a wrestler. Eadie's first match was on December 15, 1972, under the name "The Paramedic". Throughout 1973, he wrestled under a mask as the tag team "Para-Medics" in the Sheik's Detroit territory.

Eadie then wrestled in Pittsburgh, Detroit, the World Wide Wrestling Federation, and the IWA as "Bolo Mongol", the new partner of Geto Mongol.

=== Mid-Atlantic Championship Wrestling (1976–1978) ===
In 1976, Eadie entered the Mid-Atlantic Championship Wrestling territory under the management of Boris Malenko and donned a mask as "the Masked Superstar", given the character at the advice of matchmaker George Scott. It was stated that he was an Olympic champion by various wrestling promoters. He challenged opponents with a $10,000 reward to whoever could break his "cobra clutch", as well as utilizing the "corkscrew neckbreaker". The Masked Superstar was 6' 3", weighed 300 lbs and created many mismatches due to his size, strength and quickness. He had many bouts with Mighty Igor, Paul Jones, Blackjack Mulligan, Wahoo McDaniel, Mr. Wrestling II, Stan Hansen, Tommy Rich, and Dick Murdoch. In 1978, he was the first wrestler (along with Blackjack Mulligan) to have one-hour cage matches, then have a series of "12" ninety-minute cage matches, against Mulligan. It is believed that neither feat of hour or hour and a half cage matches has since been performed by any wrestlers. He was one of the first wrestlers to body slam André the Giant.

=== Georgia Championship Wrestling (1978–1980) ===
From 1978 to 1980, Eadie wrestled for Georgia Championship Wrestling. Among other accomplishments, he won four Georgia Heavyweight titles and unified that title with the NWA National Heavyweight Championship.

=== Mid-Atlantic Championship Wrestling (1980–1981) ===
Eadie left Georgia in February 1980 and returned to Mid-Atlantic Championship Wrestling as "Masked Superstar" later that month. Shortly after returning, he began teaming with Masked Superstar 2 as the "Masked Superstars". In March 1980, the Masked Superstars defeated Dino Bravo and Ricky Steamboat for the NWA Mid-Atlantic Tag Team Championship; in the same month Eadie defeated Blackjack Mulligan to win the vacant NWA Television Championship. In April 1980, Masked Superstar 2 was unmasked, causing him to leave the territory; the Masked Superstars subsequently vacated the NWA Mid-Atlantic Tag Team Championship. Eadie continued to defend the NWA Television Championship until vacating it in October 1980.

In September 1980, Eadie began teaming with Paul Jones and Ricky Steamboat to repeatedly challenge for the NWA World Tag Team Championship (Mid-Atlantic version). In November 1980, Eadie and Jones finally defeated Jimmy Snuka and Ray Stevens in a cage match to win the titles. Their reign lasted until March 1981, when they lost to Stevens and Ivan Koloff. They regained the titles from Koloff and Stevens later that month, holding them until May 1981 when they were defeated by the Minnesota Wrecking Crew. Later that month, Eadie repeatedly unsuccessfully challenged Roddy Piper for the NWA United States Heavyweight Championship (Mid Atlantic version). Eadie left Mid-Atlantic Championship Wrestling once more in June 1981 for a tour of Japan.

=== Georgia Championship Wrestling (1981–1983) ===
Eadie returned to Georgia Championship Wrestling in April 1981. In August 1981, he defeated Steve O to win the NWA National Heavyweight Championship. The following month, he defeated NWA Georgia Heavyweight Champion Tommy Rich to unify the titles. Later that month, Rich defeated him in a mask versus hair cage match to win the NWA National Heavyweight Championship. In November 1981, Eadie regained the title from Rich in a Texas death match. In January 1982, Rich won the title back in a cage match, ending their feud.

In January 1982, Eadie and The Super Destroyer defeated Bob Armstrong and Brad Armstrong for the NWA National Tag Team Championship. In March 1982, Eadie gave his half of the titles to Big John Studd. In mid-1982, Eadie revived his feud with Tommy Rich. In October 1982, he defeated Paul Orndorff to win the NWA National Heavyweight Championship for a third time; Orndorff regained the title the following month in a no disqualification match.

Eadie left Georgia Championship Wrestling once more in June 1983, briefly wrestling for Mid-South Wrestling and Lutte Internationale before returning to the World Wrestling Federation in August 1983.

=== World Wrestling Federation (1983–1984, 1985) ===
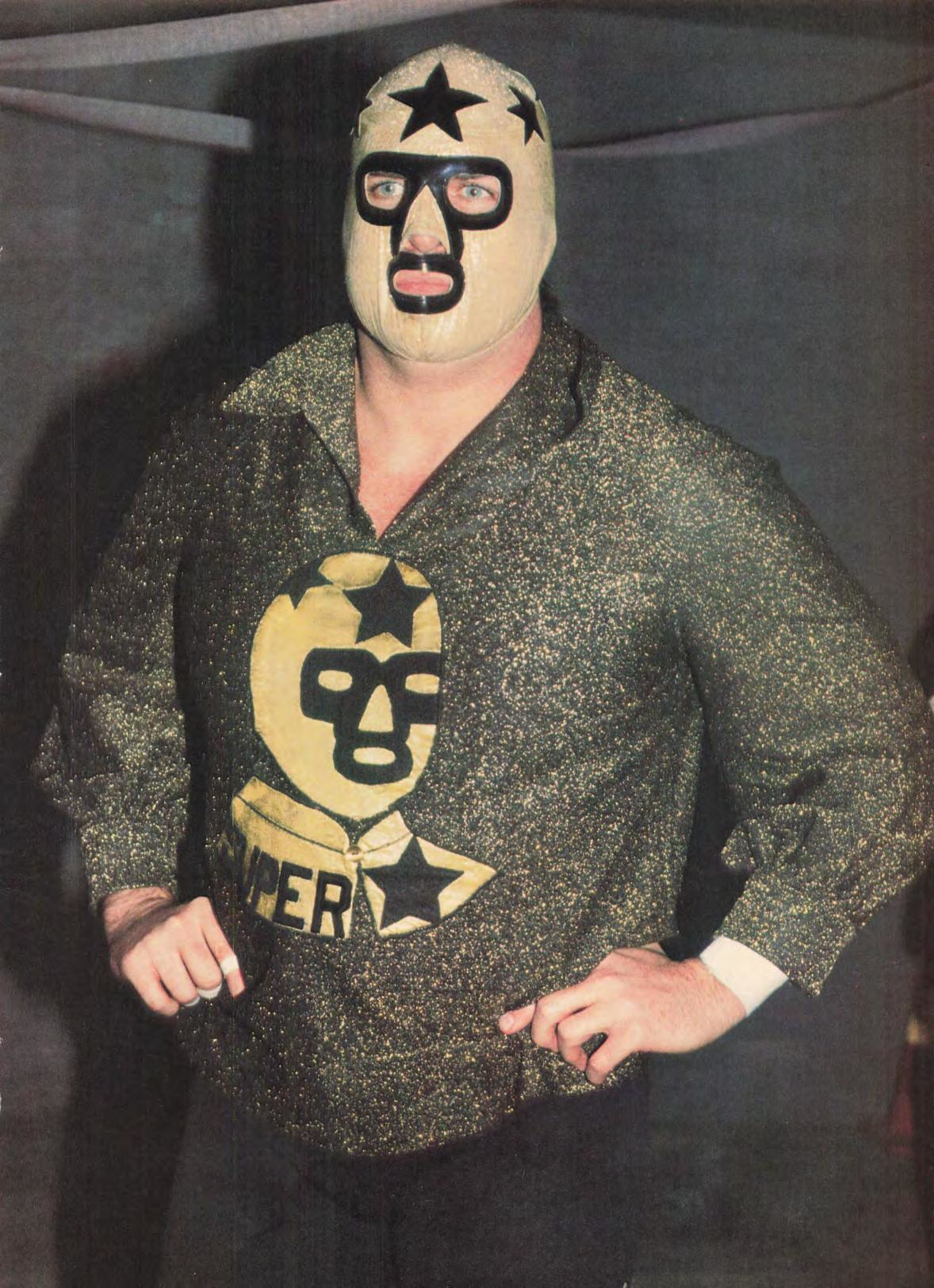
Eadie as the Masked Superstar in 1985

As the Masked Superstar, Eadie also competed in the World Wrestling Federation against many top wrestlers in 1983–84. His opponents included Bob Backlund, Hulk Hogan, Sgt. Slaughter, and Jimmy Snuka.

=== Georgia Championship Wrestling (1984) ===
In 1984, Eadie teamed with King Kong Bundy (also a hero at the time) to defeat the Road Warriors for the NWA National Tag Team Championship (which he had previously held with Super Destroyer in 1982) but was forced to give up the title due to injuries suffered in a mysterious assault (kayfabe).

=== International Wrestling (Montreal) (1984, 1985) ===
Under the persona The Masked Superstar, he feuded with Dino Bravo and Rick Martel while teaming with King Tonga.

In 1985, he returned as Bolo for two TV appearances.

=== World Wrestling Federation (1986–1990) ===
==== The Machines (1986) ====
In 1986, Eadie returned to the World Wrestling Federation and became "Super Machine" with André the Giant as "Giant Machine" and Blackjack Mulligan as "Big Machine". Eadie was the primary mouthpiece of the team. The three Machines were introduced as rivals of Bobby Heenan and his massive tag team of Big John Studd and King Kong Bundy. (The Machines' masks and gimmick were copied from New Japan Pro-Wrestling character "Super Strong Machine", played by Japanese wrestler Junji Hirata).

Eadie later dropped the Machine gimmick and left the WWF to head to Florida for a run as the Masked Superstar, upending Lex Luger to win the NWA Southern title. He held the title for two weeks before Luger regained it.

==== Demolition (1987–1990) ====
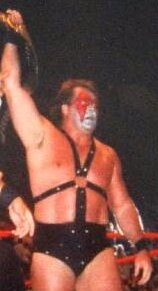
Eadie (as Ax) as WWF Tag Team Champion

In January 1987, Eadie returned to the WWF and formed the tag team Demolition with Randy Colley, formerly Moondog Rex, who wrestled as Smash while Eadie wrestled as Ax. Colley was later replaced by Barry Darsow as Smash, after it was discovered that too many people recognised Colley as Moondog Rex, the character he previously portrayed. Though they began as heels, their unique brawling style and charisma made them so popular that they became faces in November 1988. They won the WWF Tag Team Championship three times.

In 1989, Eadie played opposite Hulk Hogan as "Jake Bullet" in the movie No Holds Barred. He and Smash appeared in several Pizza Hut commercials for the "Kids Night Out" promotion widely seen on national television.

In June 1990, Demolition was expanded to a stable with the addition of Brian Adams, who briefly wrestled as "B.A." before adopting the ring name "Crush". The trio concept was precipitated by a mutual decision to phase out the Ax character and for Eadie to take a backstage role in the company. Popular rumor at the time cited heart problems on Eadie's part, which have been discredited in recent years. An allergic reaction to shellfish while in Japan after WrestleMania VI was the real cause of his temporary heart problem; Eadie confirmed this in a shoot interview in 2007. Before Eadie was medically cleared, Crush had been recruited as a temporary replacement. Demolition's third reign as champions ended at SummerSlam 1990. In September 1990, the three men wrestled against The Legion of Doom and Ultimate Warrior at Madison Square Garden. This match, which was included on the WWF SuperTape III home video, was Eadie's last bout at the Garden. Eadie's final WWF appearance was at Survivor Series 1990. This event also marked the last time that he and Smash worked together for sixteen years.

=== Late career (1991–2017) ===
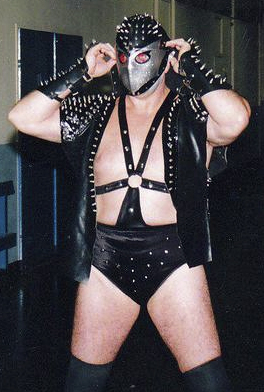
Eadie (as Ax) in 1991.

Around 1991, Ax formed a new tag team, using the Demolition name, and pairing up with a 6 ft 10 in (2.08 m) Canadian wrestler, dubbed "Canadian Giant" or "Demolition Hux." They toured with New Japan Pro-Wrestling, facing established stars such as Masa Saito, Riki Choshu and Tatsumi Fujinami, at the same time that Smash and Crush were still wrestling under the name for the then WWF and on Japanese tours with Super World of Sports. Eadie would then go on to form a third Demolition team with partner Blast (Carmine Azzato). They competed on a few independent shows, then went their separate ways.

Eadie also competed on the Southern independent circuit as The Masked Superstar. On August 15, 1997, Eadie was disqualified in a match against Jimmy Snuka at the IWA Night of the Legends show in Kannapolis, North Carolina after hitting special guest referee Ricky Steamboat. On March 1, 1998, he defeated Vladimir Koloff in Fredericksburg, Virginia to win the UCW Heavyweight Championship. On March 14, 1999, Eadie and Ben Steele captured the NAWA United States Tag Team Championship from Kane and Abel Atoms in Columbia, South Carolina.

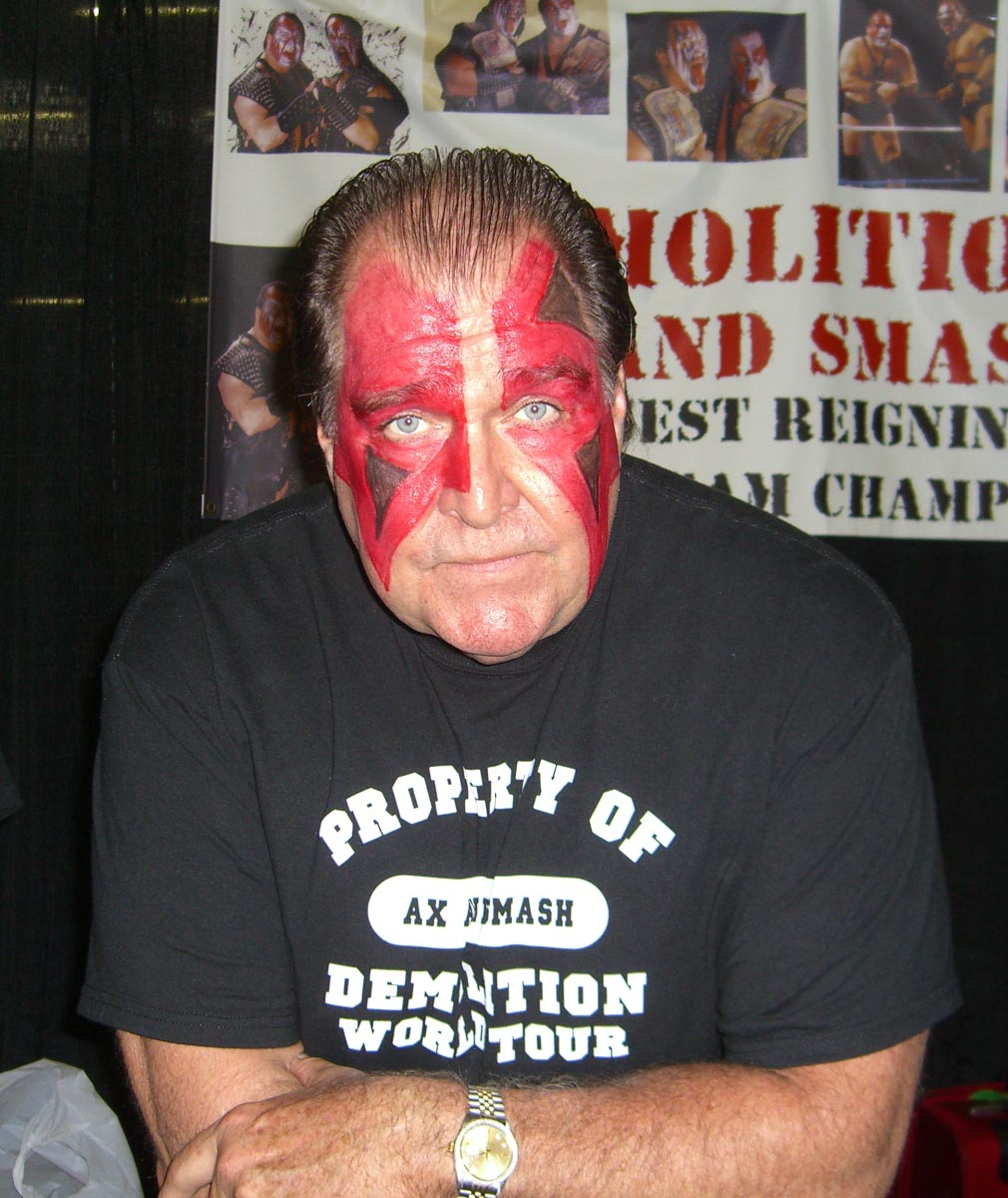
Eadie (as Ax) in 2009

The Millennium Wrestling Federation reunited Ax and Smash of Demolition at the Wrestling's Living Legends reunion April 1, 2007, prior to WrestleMania 23 in Windsor, Ontario. They began regularly competing as Ax and Smash for the first time in 16 years. The Masked Superstar defeated Greg Valentine for the Mid-Atlantic Heritage Championship. The title changed hands at the Carolina Wrestling Classic on Saturday, June 2, 2007, at the L.P. Frans Stadium in Hickory, North Carolina. Alongside One Man Gang, Demolition competed in the Chikara King of the Trios Tournament in 2008, but were eliminated in the second round by "The Fabulous Three" (Larry Sweeney, Mitch Ryder and Shayne Hawke). On March 28, 2009, Demolition Ax was inducted into the Keystone State Wrestling Alliance (KSWA) Hall of Fame in Pittsburgh, Pennsylvania. Ax was inducted because of his success, and the fact that he is a native of Brownsville, PA, also in Western Pennsylvania.

On October 2, 2010, Ax made his third appearance for the Dynamic Wrestling Alliance based in Middletown, Ohio.

On May 21, 2011, Demolition reunited at Full Impact Pro's debut iPPV In Full Force. Their match against Tony DeVito and Ralph Mosco went to a no contest when local commentator and manager Larry Dallas came out and said his men wanted revenge. The ring was stormed by Manu, Sami Callihan, Blain Rage and Joey Attel. Demolition, Devito and Mosco managed to clear the ring and beat Dallas to end the show.

Demolition returned to Chikara on September 16, 2012, taking part in a tag team gauntlet match, from which they eliminated The Devastation Corporation (Blaster McMassive and Max Smashmaster), before being eliminated themselves by their old WWF rivals, The Powers of Pain (The Barbarian and Warlord). In 2013, Eadie wrestled occasionally for independent promotions and makes signing appearances in "legends" shows across the United States, Canada, and Europe.

On June 3, 2017, Eadie announced his retirement, although he went on to have two more matches. His final singles match took place at KSWA's "Brawl Under the Bridge" event in the Homestead neighborhood of Pittsburgh, PA on July 22, 2017. On August 12, 2017, Eadie had his final match, resulting in a victory in a 6-man tag team match for Georgia Premier Wrestling in Canton, Georgia.

On March 2, 2026, The Undertaker announced that the third inductees of the WWE Hall of Fame Class of 2026 are Ax and Smash of Demolition.

== Other media ==
Ax made his video game debut in the 1991 game WWF WrestleFest, he also appeared in WWE 12. He was then added as downloadable content for WWE 2k26.

== Personal life ==
Eadie and his wife Sue reside in Roswell, Georgia, they have two daughters together Heather and Julie, and four grandchildren.

Eadie formerly supported the work of the Inner Harbour Hospital Springs Campus in Rockmart, Georgia. For several years, the Masked Superstar made many of his masks and wrestling gear available to wrestling fans through raffles and auctions, the proceeds of which supported the general operating fund of the non-profit Inner Harbour Hospital, which has since closed and all operations moved to The Shoals campus in Douglasville, Georgia due to a lack of funding.

In July 2016, Eadie was named part of a class action lawsuit filed against WWE which alleged that wrestlers incurred traumatic brain injuries during their tenure and that the company concealed the risks of injury. The suit was litigated by attorney Konstantine Kyros, who has been involved in a number of other lawsuits against WWE. US District Judge Vanessa Lynne Bryant dismissed the lawsuit in September 2018. In September 2020, an appeal for the lawsuit dismissed by a federal appeals court.

A long-time friend of André the Giant outside of wrestling, Eadie revealed in a 2016 interview that André was the godfather to his two daughters.

== Championships and accomplishments ==
- All-American Wrestling
  - AAW Tag Team Championship (1 time) – with Killer Kyle
- American Wrestling Federation
  - AWF Heavyweight Championship (1 time)
- Cauliflower Alley Club
  - Tag Team Award (2015) – with Smash
- Championship Wrestling from Florida
  - NWA Southern Heavyweight Championship (Florida version) (1 time)
- Eastern Sports Association
  - IW North American Heavyweight Championship (1 time)
- Georgia Championship Wrestling
  - NWA Georgia Heavyweight Championship (4 times)
  - NWA Georgia Tag Team Championship (1 time) – with Austin Idol
  - NWA National Heavyweight Championship (3 times)
  - NWA National Tag Team Championship (2 times) – with King Kong Bundy (1) and Super Destroyer (1)
- Great Lakes Championship Wrestling
  - GLCW Tag Team Championship (1 time) – with Smash
- International Wrestling Association
  - IWA World Tag Team Championship (2 times) - with Geeto Mongol
- Keystone State Wrestling Alliance
  - KSWA "Brawl Under the Bridge" Championship (1 time)
  - KSWA Tag Team Championship (1 time) – with Smash
- Mid-Atlantic Championship Wrestling
  - NWA Mid-Atlantic Tag Team Championship (1 time) – with Masked Superstar 2
  - NWA Television Championship (1 time)
  - NWA World Tag Team Championship (Mid-Atlantic version) (2 times) – with Paul Jones
- Midwest Championship Wrestling Alliance
  - MCWA Midwest Heavyweight Championship (1 time)
- NWA Big Time Wrestling
  - NWA American Heavyweight Championship (1 time)
- NWA Detroit
  - NWA World Tag Team Championship (Detroit version) (1 time) - with Geeto Mongol
- NWA Mid-America
  - NWA World Tag Team Championship (Mid-America version) (1 time) – with Masked Superstar 2
- New England Pro Wrestling Hall of Fame
  - Class of 2020 – with Smash
- North American Wrestling Alliance
  - NAWA Tag Team Championship (1 time) – with Ben Steele
- Ohio Professional Wrestling Hall of Fame
  - Ohio Professional Wrestling Hall of Fame (Class of 2023)
- Professional Wrestling Hall of Fame
  - Class of 2014 – as The Masked Superstar
- Pro Wrestling Illustrated
  - PWI ranked him #112 of the top 500 singles wrestlers of the "PWI Years" in 2003
- Southern States Wrestling
  - East Tennessee Wrestling Hall of Fame (Class of 1999)
- Ultimate Championship Wrestling
  - UCW Heavyweight Championship (1 time)
- United States Wrestling League
  - USWL Unified World Heavyweight Championship (1 time)
- United States Xtreme Wrestling
  - USXW Tag Team Championship (1 time) – with Smash
- Universal Superstars of America
  - USA Heavyweight Championship (1 time)
  - USA Tag Team Championship (1 time) - with Blast
- World Wrestling Federation/WWE
  - WWF Tag Team Championship (3 times) – with Smash
  - WWE Hall of Fame (Class of 2026) – with Smash
