= NWA Georgia Heavyweight Championship =

Professional wrestling championship

GCW Georgia Heavyweight Championship
- Dick Slater holding the championship belt above his head in 1977

Details
- Promotion: Georgia Championship Wrestling (1964–1981); NWA Georgia / NWA Wildside (1998–2005); NWA Action / NWA Atlanta (2013–2017); Georgia Championship Wrestling / Georgia Classic Wrestling (2021–present)
- Date established: August 9, 1964
- Current champion: Nick Halen
- Date won: June 28, 2025

Other names
- NWA Georgia Heavyweight Championship (1963–1981, 1998, 2012–2017); NWA Wildside Heavyweight Championship (1998–2005); GCW Georgia Heavyweight Championship (2021–present)
Statistics
- First champion: Sputnik Monroe
- Most reigns: Mr. Wrestling II (12 reigns)
- Longest reign: Tyson Dean (497 days)
- Shortest reign: Onyx (1> day)

The GCW Heavyweight Championship is the major title in the Georgia Championship Wrestling professional wrestling promotion. It started in 1964 and was unified in 1981 with the NWA National Heavyweight Championship.

The title was picked back up in 1998 by NWA Georgia, which became NWA Wildside in September 1999 when it merged with National Championship Wrestling. Along with this change, the championship became known as the NWA Wildside Heavyweight Championship. The title continued until Wildside ceased operations on April 30, 2005.

In 2012, NWA Action (later renamed NWA Atlanta) picked up the title and restored its original name. Cru Jones won the reactivated title by defeating Steve Stiles on June 23, 2012, in Stockbridge, Georgia, and vacated it in 2013. It was either unified with the Atlanta Heavyweight Championship in June 2015 or retired in February 2016.

Under the resurrection of Georgia Championship Wrestling, an announcement was made that the Georgia Heavyweight Championship would be revived and a new champion crowned on April 24, 2021.

In May 2025, Georgia Championship Wrestling was rebranded as Georgia Classic Wrestling, although through the name change the titles remained active.

== Title history ==
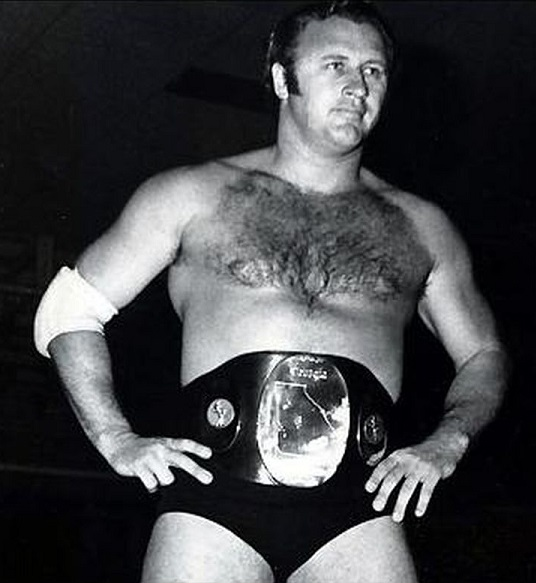
Nick Bockwinkel wearing the championship belt in 1970

=== Names ===
Name	Time of use
NWA Georgia Heavyweight Championship	February 5, 1963 – September 9, 1981
NWA Wildside Heavyweight Championship	September 1999 – April 30, 2005
NWA Georgia Heavyweight Championship	June 23, 2012 – June 15, 2017
GCW Georgia Heavyweight Championship	April 24, 2021 – present

=== Reigns ===
Wrestler	Count	Date	Location	Notes
NWA Georgia Heavyweight Championship
John Mauldin *	1	1938		Reported on an Atlanta program in July 1938 as having "recently" retired as champion.
Choo-Choo Lynn	1	February 5, 1963		Recognized in Macon.
Honey Boy Hannigan	1	July 23, 1963	Macon, GA	
Choo-Choo Lynn	2	July 30, 1963	Macon, GA	
Dick the Bruiser	1	March 24, 1964		
Sputnik Monroe	1	August 9, 1964	Atlanta, GA	
Don Fargo	1	September 25, 1964	Atlanta, GA	
Sputnik Monroe	2	October 16, 1964	Atlanta, GA	
Mario Galento	1	November 13, 1964	Atlanta, GA	
Buddy Fuller	1	May 28, 1965	Atlanta, GA	
Louie Tillet	1	May 27, 1966		
Buddy Fuller	2	June 17, 1966	Atlanta, GA	
El Mongol	1	February 24, 1967	Atlanta, GA	
Nick Kozak	1	March 17, 1967	Atlanta, GA	
El Mongol	2	April 7, 1967	Atlanta, GA	
Buddy Fuller	3	April 28, 1967	Atlanta, GA	
El Mongol	3	June 16, 1967	Atlanta, GA	
Tim Woods	1	July 11, 1967	Atlanta, GA	
El Mongol	4	July 18, 1967	Atlanta, GA	
Tim Woods	2	August 11, 1967	Atlanta, GA	
El Mongol	5	September 8, 1967	Atlanta, GA	
Bobby Shane	1	September 29, 1967		
El Mongol	6	October 10, 1967	Atlanta, GA	
Tim Woods	3	May 3, 1968	Atlanta, GA	Wins a title under a mask calling himself the Big O; Unmask on May 24, 1968.
The Big O	1	May 10, 1968	Atlanta, GA	
Tarzan Tyler	1	June 14, 1968	Atlanta, GA	
The Professional	1	August 23, 1968	Atlanta, GA	
The Big O	2	November 8, 1968	Atlanta, GA	
Held up		November 29, 1968	Atlanta, GA	After a match against with The Professional.
The Professional	2	December 6, 1968	Atlanta, GA	Defeated Valentine in a rematch to win vacant title.
Dale Lewis	1	December 27, 1968	Atlanta, GA	
El Mongol	7	February 7, 1969	Atlanta, GA	
Assassin #1	1	March 21, 1969		
El Mongol	8	April 15, 1969	Atlanta, GA	
The Professional	3	May 16, 1969	Atlanta, GA	
Paul DeMarco	1	June 21, 1969	Atlanta, GA	
Joe Scarpa	1	September 19, 1969	Atlanta, GA	
Paul DeMarco	2	October 3, 1969	Atlanta, GA	
The Professional	4	November 28, 1969	Atlanta, GA	
Vacated		February 18, 1970		After The Professional was injured.
Assassin #2	1	March 13, 1970	Atlanta, GA	Defeated Joe Scarpa in an 8-man tournament final to win the vacant title.
Nick Bockwinkel	1	April 17, 1970	Atlanta, GA	
Paul DeMarco	3	July 17, 1970	Atlanta, GA	
Nick Bockwinkel	2	July 24, 1970	Atlanta, GA	
Buddy Colt	1	September 4, 1970	Atlanta, GA	
Fred Blassie	1	November 13, 1970	Atlanta, GA	
Buddy Colt	2	November 20, 1970	Atlanta, GA	
Ray Gunkel	1	November 27, 1970	Atlanta, GA	
Vacated		November 30, 1970		When Buddy Colt and Homer O'Dell file an appeal.
El Mongol	9	February 5, 1971	Atlanta, GA	Defeated Nick Bockwinkel in a 14-man tournament final to win the vacant title.
Buddy Colt	3	June 18, 1971	Atlanta, GA	
Ray Gunkel	2	July 20, 1971	Atlanta, GA	
Buddy Colt	4	January 1972		
El Mongol	10	January 25, 1972		
Buddy Colt	5	April 8, 1972	Griffin, GA	
Roberto Soto	1	May 5, 1972		
Vacated		November 1972		When Soto jumps to the All South Wrestling Alliance.
Mr. Wrestling II	1	March 2, 1973	Atlanta, GA	Defeated Sputnik Monroe in a 16-man tournament final to win the vacant title.
Bill Watts	1	May 11, 1973	Atlanta, GA	
Mr. Wrestling II	2	July 13, 1973		
Bill Watts	2	July 21, 1973	Atlanta, GA	
Stripped		August 17, 1973		After Watts deliberately gets disqualified in a defense against Mr. Wrestling II.
Mr. Wrestling II	3	August 31, 1973		Defeated Watts in a rematch to win the title.
Bill Watts	3	November 2, 1973	Atlanta, GA	
Ron Fuller	1	December 21, 1973	Atlanta, GA	
Mr. Wrestling II	4	January 11, 1974	Atlanta, GA	
Buddy Colt	6	July 5, 1974	Atlanta, GA	
Mr. Wrestling II	5	August 30, 1974	Atlanta, GA	
Harley Race	1	September 13, 1974	Atlanta, GA	
Don Muraco	1	September 21, 1974		
Held Up		October 4, 1974		After match with Buddy Colt.
Luke Graham	1	October 8, 1974	Atlanta, GA	Won a tournament to win the vacant title.
Buddy Colt	7	October 11, 1974	Atlanta, GA	Won a battle royal to win the title.
Held up		November 15, 1974	Atlanta, GA	In a following match against Rocky Johnson.
Rocky Johnson	1	December 6, 1974	Atlanta, GA	Defeated Colt in a rematch.
Abdullah the Butcher	1	February 21, 1975	Atlanta, GA	
Mr. Wrestling II	6	July 4, 1975	Atlanta, GA	
Abdullah the Butcher	2	July 11, 1975	Atlanta, GA	
Toru Tanaka	1	August 7, 1975	Atlanta, GA	
Mike McCord	1	September 16, 1975		
Nikolai Volkoff	1	September 23, 1975	Atlanta, GA	
Mr. Wrestling II	7	October 3, 1975	Atlanta, GA	
The Spoiler	1	November 27, 1975	Atlanta, GA	
Dusty Rhodes	1	January 30, 1976	Atlanta, GA	
The Spoiler	2	February 6, 1976	Atlanta, GA	
Dick Slater	1	August 20, 1976	Atlanta, GA	
Mr. Wrestling II	8	October 26, 1976	Columbus, GA	
Dick Slater	2	November 25, 1976	Columbus, GA	
Paul Jones	1	April 15, 1977		
Dick Slater	3	June 4, 1977		
Mr. Wrestling II	9	July 22, 1977		
Stan Hansen	1	November 16, 1977		
Mr. Wrestling II	10	January 25, 1978		
Stan Hansen	2	February 6, 1978		
Stripped		May 20, 1978		When attacking the referee after a match with Mr. Wrestling II.
Angelo Mosca	1	June 9, 1978	Atlanta, GA	Won a one night 14-man tournament to win the vacant title.
Stripped		September 23, 1978		After a match with Thunderbolt Patterson.
Mr. Wrestling II	11	October 16, 1978	Augusta, GA	Defeated Stan Hansen in a one night 6-man tournament final.
Masked Superstar	1	December 4, 1978	Augusta, GA	
Wahoo McDaniel	1	May 14, 1979	Augusta, GA	
Masked Superstar	2	July 30, 1979	Augusta, GA	
Wahoo McDaniel	2	August 17, 1979	Augusta, GA	
Vacated		August 18, 1979		After double pin in a match with Masked Superstar.
Killer Karl Kox	1	August 24, 1979	Augusta, GA	Defeats Bob Armstrong in a one night 14-man tournament final.
Tommy Rich	1	October 26, 1979	Atlanta, GA	
Masked Superstar	3	December 7, 1979	Atlanta, GA	
Mr. Wrestling II	12	January 12, 1980	Atlanta, GA	
Austin Idol	2	March 29, 1980	Atlanta, GA	
Baron von Raschke	1	June 8, 1980	Atlanta, GA	
Steve Keirn	1	August 11, 1980		
Dennis Condrey	1	September 8, 1980		
Tony Atlas	1	October 24, 1980	Atlanta, GA	
Vacated		April 1981		When Tony Atlas leaves Georgia.
Tommy Rich	2	May 17, 1981	Atlanta, GA	Defeated Greg Valentine in a tournament final to win the vacant title.
Ken Patera	1	June 12, 1981	Atlanta, GA	
Tommy Rich	3	August 9, 1981	Atlanta, GA	Defeated Masked Superstar to win the vacant title when Patera leaves the area after a dispute with booker Ole Anderson.
Masked Superstar	4	September 12, 1981	Atlanta, GA	
Retired		September 13, 1981	Atlanta, GA	Unified with the NWA National Heavyweight Championship.
Billy Black	1	June 1, 1998		Awarded the title when it is revived by NWA Georgia.
Lord Humongous	1	February 25, 1999	Loganville, GA	
Silky Boom Boom	1	April 5, 1999	Loganville, GA	
Frenchy Riviera	1	May 6, 1999	Loganville, GA	
Silky Boom Boom	2	June 2, 1999	Conyers, GA	
Bart Sawyer	1	June 27, 1999	Stockbridge, GA	
Vacated		October 1999		
NWA Wildside Heavyweight Championship.
Rick Michaels	1	October 14, 1999	Loganville, GA	Last eliminated Dusty Dotson in a Mega Rumble match to win the vacant title.
Vacated		January 2000		
Rukkus	1	February 5, 2000	Cornelia, GA	Won the title in a Mega Rumble match.
Stone Mountain	1	April 15, 2000	Cornelia, GA	Defeated Mark E. Mark, who subbed for Rukkus.
Prince Justice	1	May 5, 2001	Cornelia, GA	
Scott Wrenn	1	September 1, 2001	Cornelia, GA	
Rick Michaels	2	October 19, 2001	Cornelia, GA	
A.J. Styles	1	December 22, 2001	Cornelia, GA	
David Young	1	March 23, 2002	Cornelia, GA	Defeated Styles and Rick Michaels in a three-way elimination match.
Jason Cross	1	June 1, 2002	Cornelia, GA	
Adam Jacobs	1	June 29, 2002	Cornelia, GA	Won a gauntlet steel cage match, last eliminating A.J. Styles.
David Young	2	August 2, 2002	Cornelia, GA	Defeated John Phoenix when Jacobs no-showed.
Iceberg	1	September 22, 2002	Cornelia, GA	
Hotstuff Hernandez	1	July 5, 2003	Cornelia, GA	
Onyx	1	October 25, 2003	Cornelia, GA	
Jason Cross	2	September 4, 2004	Cornelia, GA	
Ray Gordy	1	December 4, 2004	Cornelia, GA	
Onyx	2	December 4, 2004	Cornelia, GA	
Rainman	1	March 26, 2005	Cornelia, GA	Defeated Onyx and Ray Gordy in a three-way match.
Onyx	3	April 30, 2005	Cornelia, GA	Final champion.
Retired		April 30, 2005	Cornelia, GA	When NWA Wildside closes.
NWA Georgia Heavyweight Championship.
Cru Jones	1	June 23, 2012	Stockbridge, GA	Defeats Steve Stiles to be recognized by NWA Action when title is revived.
Vacated		September 2013		
Andy Anderson	1	October 26, 2013	Stockbridge, GA	Defeats Pain in 32-man tournament final.
Tyson Dean	1	December 14, 2013	Griffin, GA	
Odinson	1	April 25, 2015	Griffin, GA	Replaces Shane Marx, who is injured during the match to defeats Tyson Dean.
Tommy Too Much	1	June 27, 2015	Stockbridge, GA	Reigning NWA Atlanta Heavyweight Champion, defeats Odinson in a unification match.
Mike Pain	1	August 13, 2016	Dudley, GA	Recognized as champion by NWA Georgia after NWA Atlanta closes operations
Logan Creed	1	October 1, 2016	Columbus, GA	
Damien Wayne	1	July 15, 2017	Columbus, GA	NWA ends licenses with promotions worldwide. Title declared vacant
GCW Georgia Heavyweight Championship
Terry Lawler	1	April 24, 2021	Buckhead, GA	Title is revived under the new GCW. Lawler wins a 20 man Rumble match to win the vacated championship. Last eliminating Shawn Hunter
Shawn Hunter	1	July 24, 2021	Buckhead, GA	
Charlie Anarchy	1	April 30, 2022	Buckhead, GA	
Chop Top	1	July 30, 2022	Buckhead, GA	
Hunter James	1	March 25, 2023	Buckhead, GA	
Terry Lawler	2	September 30, 2023	Buckhead, GA	
Sean Nelson	1	November 30, 2024	Buckhead, GA	
Nick Halen	1	June 28,2025	Buckhead, GA	
Terry Lawler	3	March 28,2026	Buckhead, GA	

== See also ==
- Georgia Championship Wrestling
- National Wrestling Alliance
- NWA Wildside
