= Buddy Colt =

American professional wrestler (1936–2021)

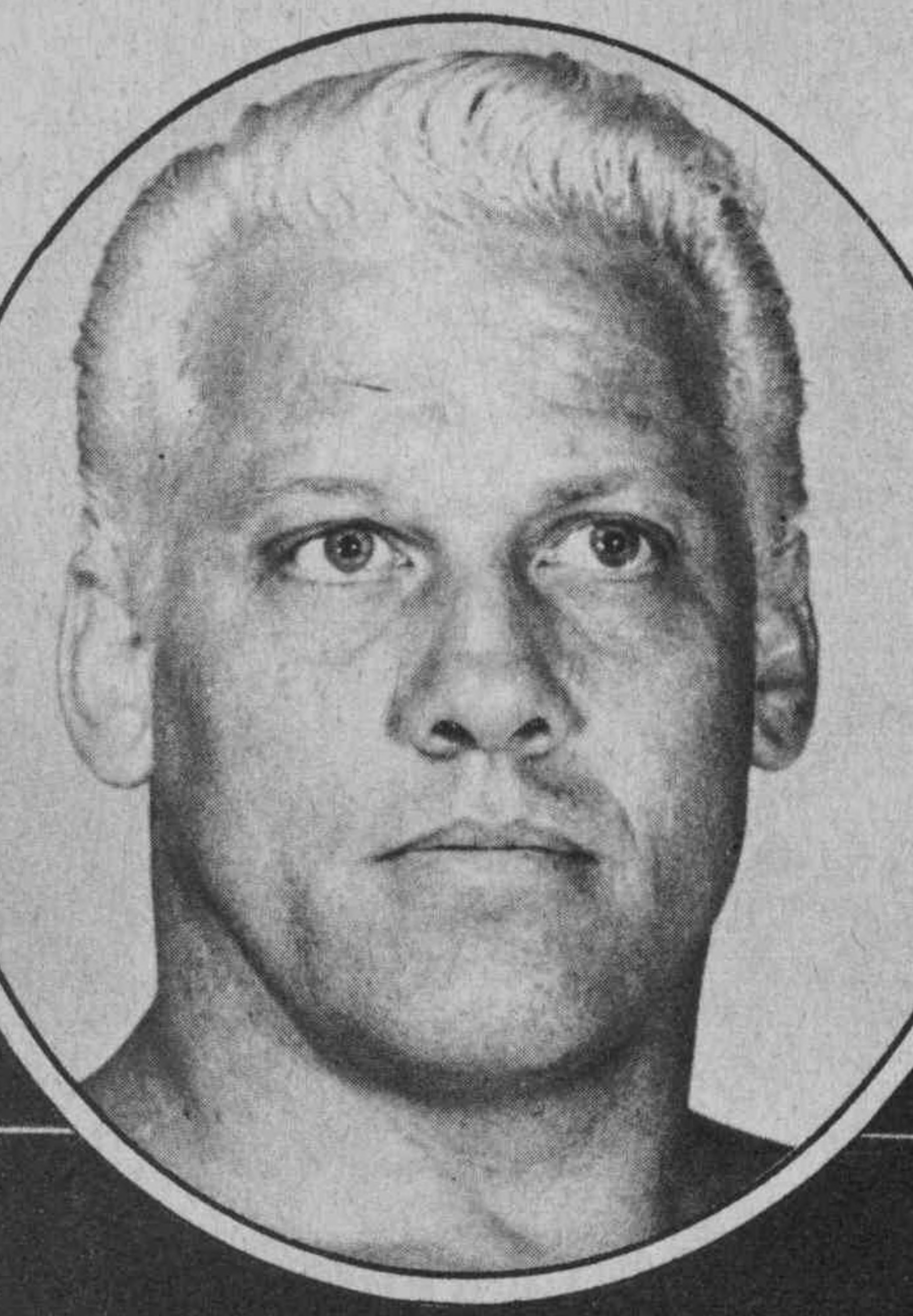
- Colt, circa 1973

Personal information
- Born: Ron Read; January 13, 1936 Bladensburg, Maryland, U.S.
- Died: March 3, 2021 (aged 85) Tampa, Florida, U.S.
- Spouse: Lorraine Read
- Children: Cindy Read Carmack, Vicki Read, LeighAnn Frankel, Tracey Nance, Ricky Nance

Professional wrestling career
- Ring name(s): Buddy Colt; Ron Reed; Ty Colt
- Billed height: 6 ft 1 in (185 cm)
- Billed weight: 235 lb (107 kg)
- Trained by: Killer Karl Krupp
- Debut: June 4, 1962
- Retired: 1975
- Military service
- Allegiance: United States
- Branch: United States Marine Corps

Ron Read (January 13, 1936 – March 3, 2021), known professionally as Buddy Colt, Ty Colt and "Cowboy" Ron Read, was an American professional wrestler who worked in NWA promotions including the St. Louis Wrestling Club, Championship Wrestling from Florida and Georgia Championship Wrestling. Among others, he won the NWA Georgia Heavyweight Championship seven times, the NWA Florida Southern Heavyweight Championship four and the NWA North American Heavyweight Championship once.

== Early life ==
Read grew up in Bladensburg, Maryland, before becoming an aviation mechanic and sergeant in the United States Marines, discharging in January 1957.

== Professional wrestling career ==
Trained by Killer Karl Krupp, Read made his professional wrestling debut in 1962 in Nick Gulas and Roy Welch's NWA Mid-America in the Tennessee region, worked under the name “Cowboy” Ron Reed. Aside from NWA Mid-America, he also worked St. Louis Wrestling Club, went to the West Coast to work for the World Wrestling Alliance (WWA) where he was renamed Ty Colt. In 1969, he renamed to Buddy Colt working NWA Western States, the Amarillo, Texas promotion run by the Funk family, where he quickly won the NWA North American Heavyweight Championship.

On February 20, 1975, Colt was the pilot of a plane, which crashed in water near Tampa Bay, resulting in the death of Bobby Shane. Colt and passengers Gary Hart and Mike McCord were seriously injured. He retired from wrestling due to broken ankles, which later developed gangrene and were fused together, but continued to fly. He remained in Championship Wrestling from Florida as a color commentator along with Gordon Solie and had part ownership of the company.

== Death ==
Read died on March 3, 2021, aged 85. He had Parkinson's disease and dementia, and is survived by his wife of 40 years, Lorraine Read.

== Championships and accomplishments ==
- 50th State Big Time Wrestling
  - NWA Hawaii Heavyweight Championship (1 time)
- Central States Wrestling
  - NWA Central States Heavyweight Championship (2 times)
  - NWA North American Tag Team Championship (Central States version) (2 times) – with Doug Gilbert
- Championship Wrestling from Florida
  - NWA Florida Heavyweight Championship (4 times)
  - NWA Florida Television Championship (1 time)
  - NWA Southern Heavyweight Championship (Florida version) (4 times)
- Georgia Championship Wrestling
  - NWA Georgia Heavyweight Championship (7 times)
  - NWA Macon Tag Team Championship (4 times) - with Homer O'Dell, Karl Von Stroheim, Skandor Akbar and Big Bad John
- Western States Sports
  - NWA North American Heavyweight Championship (Amarillo version) (1 time)
  - NWA Western States Tag Team Championship (2 times) – with Gorgeous George Jr.
