= NWA Wildside =

American professional wrestling promotion

- Founded: September 1999
- Defunct: April 2005
- Style: American Wrestling
- Headquarters: Cornelia, Georgia
- Founder: Steve Martin
- Owner: Bill Behrens
- Formerly: National Championship Wrestling; NWA Georgia

NWA Wildside was an American independent professional wrestling promotion based in Cornelia, Georgia, with an office in Atlanta, Georgia, operating between September 1999 and April 2005. It was originally formed when National Championship Wrestling merged with NWA Georgia. While in operation, NWA Wildside was one of the main affiliates of the National Wrestling Alliance, a group that dates back to 1948. It also served as a developmental territory for World Championship Wrestling.

== History ==
NWA Wildside originated as National Championship Wrestling. In November 1998, the first show was held at the (then) NCW Arena in Cornelia, Georgia. Over the next few months, NCW began to gain notoriety in the Georgia independent scene until Bill Behrens approached Steve Martin with an offer to syndicate NCW television programming and merge his company NWA Georgia to create one NWA affiliate. This offer was accepted, and in September 1999, the first NWA Wildside weekly show aired out of Atlanta. Over the next six years, multiple notable wrestling personalities appeared on NWA Wildside television. Wrestlers such as Onyx, David Young and Rick Michaels appeared on World Wrestling Federation tapings. With the establishment of Total Nonstop Action Wrestling, various NWA Wildside stars such as Styles, Abyss (Prince Justice), Young, Onyx, Slim J, Joey Corman, Hotstuff Hernandez, Jason Cross, Jimmy Rave, Altar Boy Luke, Matt Sydal, Delirious, and Tony Mamaluke appeared for the company.

=== WCW developmental territory ===
World Championship Wrestling (WCW) hired NWA Wildside to serve as its development territory and sent their Power Plant wrestlers like Shannon Moore, Jamie Noble, Sean O'Haire, Mark Jindrak and Elix Skipper to compete in the company. WCW hired several NWA Wildside talent for their shows including A.J. Styles and Frank "Air" Paris

=== Television ===
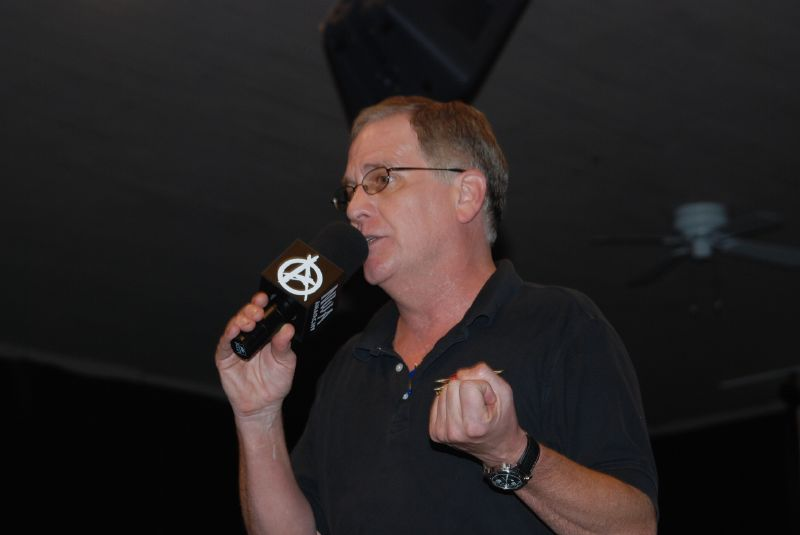
Bill Behrens, former owner of NWA Wildside

Wildside's weekly one-hour TV show aired nationally through syndication and was available to as much as 40% of the United States at its peak. By 2002, NWA Wildside was the fourth most-watched wrestling program in the United States.

In late 2004, Wildside was broadcast by The Wrestling Channel in the United Kingdom giving them a transatlantic audience.

=== Demise ===
In April 2005, NWA Wildside closed down, after producing 300 consecutive weeks of television, as a result of owner Behrens accepting a job with World Wrestling Entertainment. NWA Wildside was replaced by NWA Anarchy, a promotion operating in the same arena using similar talent.

=== Legacy ===
NWA Wildside had a notable influence on the early 2000s independent wrestling scene. Multiple future international superstars passed through Wildside in its six-year existence. Wildside's syndication television deal largely kept NWA wrestling on the map in the first half of the decade as one of the NWA's main affiliates.

On September 9, 2017, NWA Wildside held a reunion show at the former NCW Arena, now the Landmark Arena in Cornelia, Georgia featuring over 50 alumni from the Wildside years including Bad Attitude, New Jack, Tank, Iceberg and A.J. Styles.

== Championships ==
Champions listed are the final champions in Wildside.

- NWA Wildside Heavyweight Championship — Onyx
- NWA Wildside Junior Heavyweight Championship — Slim J.
- NWA Wildside Tag Team Championship — Iceberg and Tank
- NWA Wildside Television Championship — Brandon P
- NWA Wildside United States Heavyweight Championship — Rainman (unified with NWA Wildside Heavyweight Championship)
- NWA Wildside Hardcore Championship — The Jailhouse Rocker

== Alumni ==
- Altar Boy Luke
- C. W. Anderson
- Brian Black
- Bull Buchanan
- Brian Christopher
- Jason Cross
- Eddie Golden
- El Blanco Burrow
- Delirious
- Ray Gordy
- Jimmy Rave
- Chris Hamrick
- Chris Harris
- Hotstuff Hernandez
- Ron Killings
- New Jack
- Prince Justice
- Alexis Laree
- Lodi
- Tony Mamaluke
- Joey Matthews
- Rick Michaels
- Shannon Moore
- Sean O'Haire
- Kenny Omega
- Onyx
- Air Paris
- Bob Sapp
- Ric Savage
- Sinister Minister
- Sal Rinauro
- Tony Stradlin
- A.J. Styles
- Matt Sydal
- David Young

== See also ==
- List of National Wrestling Alliance territories
- List of independent wrestling promotions in the United States
