= Air Paris =

American professional wrestler (born 1979)

Personal information
- Born: Frank Parris; May 11, 1979 (age 47) Summerville, Georgia, U.S.

Professional wrestling career
- Ring name(s): Air Paris; Frank Ott; Kid Ego
- Billed height: 6 ft 1 in (1.85 m)
- Billed weight: 185 lb (84 kg; 13.2 st)
- Billed from: Atlanta, Georgia
- Debut: April 20, 1996

Frank Parris (born May 11, 1979) is an American professional wrestler. He is best known for his stint in World Championship Wrestling under ring name Air Paris.

== Professional wrestling career ==
=== Debut ===
On April 20, 1996, Parris made his professional wrestling debut under ring name Kid Ego, where he and Mark Pain lost to Dusty Dotson and Nasty Critter in a tag team match for the North Georgia Wrestling Alliance. One week later, Ego made his singles debut in a losing effort to Mike Golden. After losing to Jailhouse Rocker on May 10, he picked up the first win of his career by defeating Kenny D on June 21.

=== National Wrestling Alliance ===
==== NWA Wildside ====
After a three-year hiatus, Parris returned to wrestling and began competing on the independent circuit, most prominently for the National Wrestling Alliance, as Air Paris. He debuted for the NWA on September 25, 1999, at their 51st anniversary show, and was unable to win a battle royal to determine the number one contender for the World Junior Heavyweight Championship. Paris appeared at the following year's anniversary show on October 14, 2000, where he and Cassidy O'Reilly lost to Bad Attitude (David Young and Rick Michaels) in a match for the World Tag Team Championship. After debuting in the NWA territory Wildside in early 1999, he soon won the territory's Junior Heavyweight Championship on May 13. However, he was stripped of the title on October 28 after being unable to defend the title in 30 days due to an injury. Paris regained the title after defeating Andy Anderson on November 4, but was once again stripped of the title in May 2000. Paris would go on to win his first and only Television Championship after defeating Eddie Golden on January 6, 2001, but lost the title to A.J. Styles that same night.

==== Music City Wrestling / NWA Main Event ====
In addition to Wildside, Paris began competing for Music City Wrestling and Main Event, two other NWA territories. While in MCW, he won the North American Championship. Meanwhile, in Main Event, he reformed his tag team with Cassidy O'Reilly and together, they won the North American Tag Team Championship on August 14, 1999. They later lost the title on November 27 to New South (Ashley Hudson and Cory Williams). Chase Stevens later replaced Paris in the tag team due to Paris signing a developmental deal with World Championship Wrestling in 2000. Despite being contracted to WCW, Paris returned to Main Event and won the North American Tag Team Title for the second time, this time with Big Bully Douglas, on April 14, 2000. They held the title until September of that year before it was vacated due to Paris and Douglas splitting.

=== World Championship Wrestling (2001) ===
After being signed to a deal with World Championship Wrestling in 2000, Parris, under his Air Paris name, debuted for the promotion alongside former NWA Wildside rival A.J. Styles on the February 14, 2001, episode of Thunder, where they lost to Evan Karagias and Jamie Noble. Paris and Styles gained their first and only win in WCW when they scored an upset against former World Tag Team Champions The Boogie Knights (Alex Wright and Disco Inferno) the following week on Thunder. Paris and Styles made their Nitro debut on the March 5 episode, there they lost to Elix Skipper and Kid Romeo in quarterfinals of a tournament to crown the first WCW Cruiserweight Tag Team Champions. On the final episode of Thunder on March 21, Styles was renamed to Air Styles and together the team was given the new name Air Raid as they went on to lose to The Jung Dragons. When WCW was bought out by the World Wrestling Federation, neither Paris nor Styles had their contracts picked up by the WWF.

=== Independent circuit ===
After the closures of both WCW and NWA Wildside, Paris returned to competing on the Georgia independent circuit, and wrestled his final match in the Rings of Glory promotion on December 16, 2005. On May 1, 2008, he returned to wrestling under his Air Paris name and joined the promotion NAWA Ring Champions as a booker and wrestler.

==== NAWA Ring Champions ====
Upon debuting, Paris was given a match for any NAWA championship of his choosing by Commissioner Ted Guinness, but was subsequently attacked by The Exotic Ones (Simon Sermon and Rick Michaels), the promotion's Tag Team Champions. On May 15, Paris teamed with Cruiserweight Champion Chris Ganz to face The Exotic Ones for the Tag Team Championship, but were unsuccessful in winning the title. After the match, Paris turned on Ganz by utilizing the title match he received from Guinness and defeated Ganz to win the Cruiserweight Championship, resulting in Paris becoming a heel in the process.

After vacating the Cruiserweight Title, Paris began feuding with Ganz and faced him on June 5 in a tag team match, but was unsuccessful as he and Jason Valentine lost to Ganz and Tommy Rich. On July 3, their feud culminated when Paris and Bobby Eaton were defeated by Ganz and Ricky Morton.

==== Purks International Championship Wrestling ====
In 2009, Parris left NAWA Ring Champions and joined Purks International Championship Wrestling as a booker and wrestler. He made his in-ring debut for the promotion on December 16 as a heel, where he and Bobby Hayes lost to The Steiner Brothers. After the match, Paris shook hands with the Steiner Brothers, becoming a face in the process, but was attacked by Hayes until being saved by the Steiner Brothers.

On February 6, 2010, Paris teamed with David Young and Ron Simmons to face Hayes, Terry Lawler and Alexander the Great, but lost after Young turned on Paris by attacking him. On March 6, Paris wrestled against former tag team partner and then-TNA World Heavyweight Champion A.J. Styles in a non-title match, which ended in a no-contest due to outside interference. Paris then continued his feud with Hayes and Young and defeated them in a tag team match with Kevin Nash as his partner on April 10. After the match, Hayes piledrove Paris before Young did the same, injuring him in the process.

Despite being injured, Paris returned on June 12 during a triple threat match for the Heavyweight Championship between Hayes, Young and Chris Harris and helped Harris defeat Hayes and Young to win the Heavyweight Title. On February 12, 2011, Paris teamed with Terry Lawler to defeat Hayes and Young in a tag team match.

== Other media ==
In 2013, Parris was announced as being one of the contributors to Phenomenal, the autobiography of former tag team partner A.J. Styles.

== Championships and accomplishments ==
- Music City Wrestling
  - NWA North American Heavyweight Championship (1 time)
- NAWA Ring Champions
  - NAWA Ring Champions Cruiserweight Championship (1 time)
- NWA Main Event
  - NWA North American Tag Team Championship (2 times) – with Cassidy O'Reilly (1 time) and Big Bully Douglas (1 time)
- NWA Wildside
  - NWA Wildside Junior Heavyweight Championship (2 times)
  - NWA Wildside Television Championship (1 time)
- Pro Wrestling Illustrated
  - PWI ranked him number #195 of the 500 best singles wrestlers in the PWI 500 in 2001
