= Ray Gordy =

American professional wrestler (born 1979)

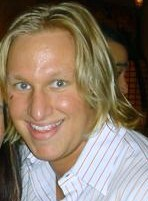
- Gordy in 2007

Personal information
- Born: Terry Ray Gordy Jr. March 23, 1979 (age 47) Chattanooga, Tennessee, U.S.
- Family: Terry Gordy (father); Miranda Gordy (sister); Richard Slinger (cousin)

Professional wrestling career
- Ring name(s): Jesse; Jesse Dalton; Ray Geezy; Ray Gordy; T-Ray; Terry Gordy Jr. Slam Master J
- Billed height: 5 ft 10 in (1.78 m)
- Billed weight: 220 lb (100 kg)
- Billed from: Chattanooga, Tennessee; The ATL
- Trained by: Terry Gordy; Pro Wrestling Noah
- Debut: 2000
- Retired: April 22, 2010

Terry Ray Gordy Jr. (born March 23, 1979) is an American retired professional wrestler. He is best known for his appearances with World Wrestling Entertainment (WWE) between 2005 and 2010, where he performed on its SmackDown brand under the ring names Jesse and Slam Master J.

== Professional wrestling career ==
=== Early career (2000–2005) ===
After receiving training from his father Terry, Gordy began performing for several promotions, most notably NWA Georgia and North American Wrestling Association (NAWA), where he found championship success in both promotions.

In 2001, Gordy went to Japan to wrestle for Pro Wrestling Noah. There he stayed and wrestled until 2002 where he joined NAWA Ring Champions based out of Rome, Georgia. There he formed a brief team with Nick Rampage and Jayson Phoenix known as the New Varsity Club. Early 2003 saw Gordy form a new union with Iceberg Slim and Tank Norton known as the Extreme Freebirds. During this time he had a string of matches against his former partners Phoenix and Rampage, along with matches against A.J. Styles.

=== World Wrestling Entertainment (2005–2010) ===
==== Developmental territories (2005–2007) ====
In August 2005, Gordy signed a developmental contract with World Wrestling Entertainment (WWE). He made his televised debut for the company on the December 9, 2005 episode of SmackDown!, where he lost to The Boogeyman in just over a minute. Following this, Gordy was assigned to Deep South Wrestling (DSW) in early 2006 under the ring name Ray Geezy, a white rapper gimmick based on Young Jeezy. He teamed with Damian Steele, who contrasted Geezy by being African American, preppy and well-spoken. In November 2006, Gordy dropped the gangsta gimmick, was renamed to Cousin Ray and adopted a hillbilly gimmick as he began teaming with Henry Godwinn at SmackDown! house shows.

==== Jesse and Festus (2007–2009) ====
On the May 11, 2007 edition of SmackDown!, a vignette aired with Gordy as Jesse Dalton alongside fellow WWE developmental talent Drew Hankinson as Festus Dalton. It was reported on June 2, 2007 that the Dalton Boys gimmick was being changed by WWE. Jesse and Festus were put in traditional wrestling gear and transformed their gimmick to be a little less country. On the June 29, 2007 edition of SmackDown!, vignettes hyping the team of Jesse and Festus began to air.

Jesse and Festus made their official televised in-ring debut on the October 5, 2007 edition of SmackDown!, defeating Mike Tolar and Chad Collyer. Their secondary gimmick was that when the opening bell rang, Festus's persona changed into a very focused, aggressive competitor as compared to the aloof, absent-minded character he had been portrayed as. When the bell rang signifying the end of the match, Festus returned to his "normal" self.

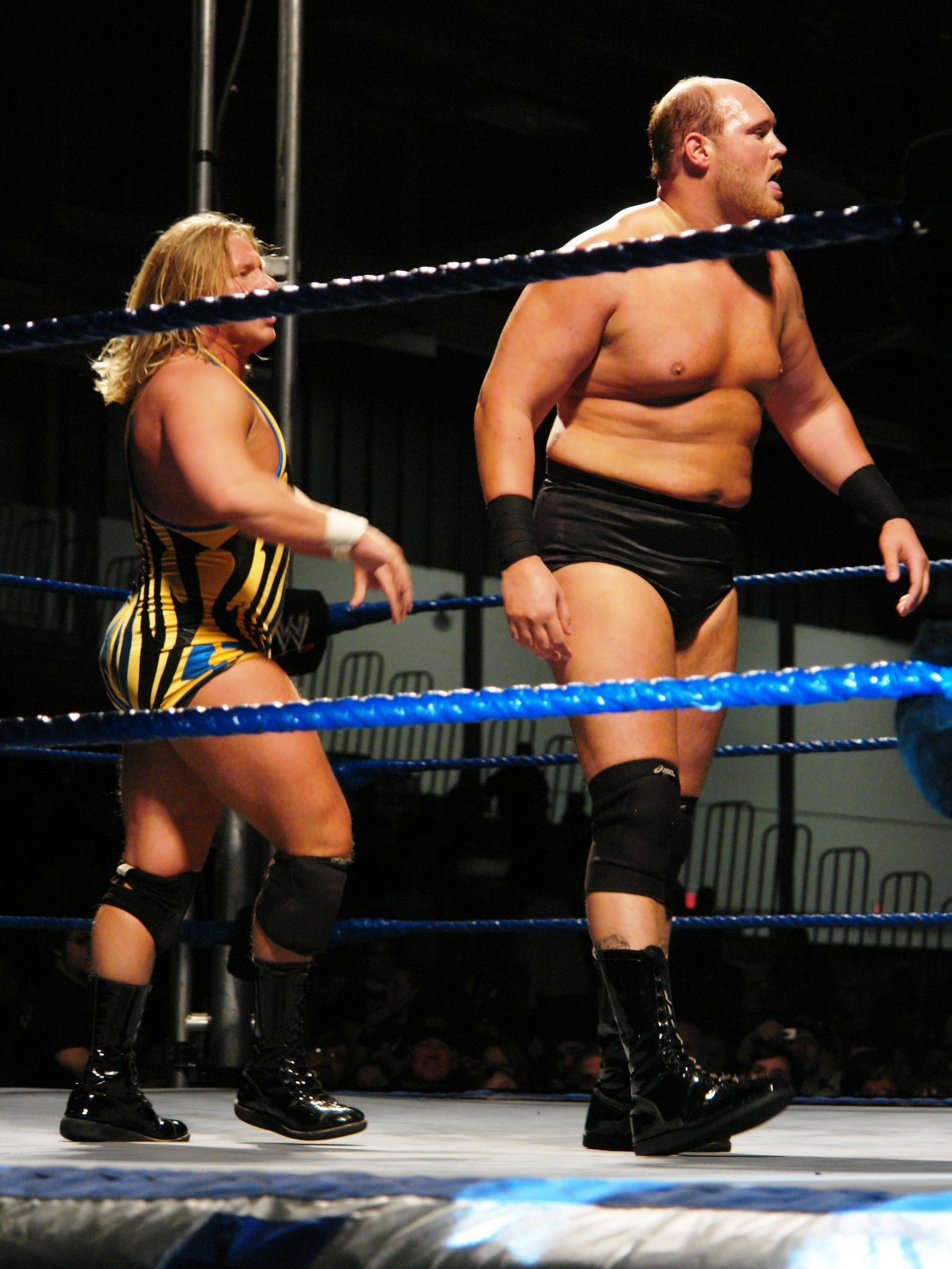
Jesse with his former tag team partner Festus

On the October 16, 2007 edition of ECW, Jesse and Festus made their debut for the ECW brand in conjunction with a "Talent Exchange" discussed between ECW General Manager Armando Estrada and acting SmackDown! General Manager Vickie Guerrero. Jesse and Festus defeated their first notable opponents, the team of Elijah Burke and Nunzio.

On the November 9 episode of SmackDown!, Jesse and Festus suffered their first WWE loss in a 10-Man Tag Team Battle Royal to determine the number one contenders for the WWE Tag Team Championship that also involved Deuce 'n Domino, The Major Brothers, Shannon Moore and Jimmy Wang Yang, and William Regal and Dave Taylor. Jesse and Festus suffered their second loss in the WWE when they were defeated by the WWE Tag Team Champions John Morrison and the Miz on the November 27 edition of ECW, and lost to them again on the December 7 episode of SmackDown!.

After a brief hiatus, more vignettes aired that featured Jesse explaining Festus' condition and spoke of a cure for it. The team returned on February 8, 2008, on SmackDown, defeating Deuce 'n Domino. Festus appeared to be unchanged, aside from perhaps being more aggressive than ever. This success continued as they once again defeated Morrison and Miz in another non-title match on the February 29 edition of SmackDown. When they received a title match on the March 21 edition, however, they failed to win.

They continued in a sporadic feud with Miz and Morrison for the rest of 2008, but also underwent a gimmick change which began on the September 12 edition of SmackDown. Jesse and Festus made their way to the ring, dressed in moving attire, and with a hand truck, large cardboard box and moving supplies. After an attack from Kenny Dykstra the duo proceeded to package Dykstra up and roll him away. The next week they did the same thing to Ryan Braddock and later the set of Carlito's Cabana. The gimmick highlighted SmackDown's move to MyNetworkTV, complete with overalls bearing the parodic company title of "MyMoving Company". After the show's move, however, they reverted to their previous gimmick.

On April 15, 2009, Festus was drafted to the Raw brand as part of the 2009 Supplemental Draft and, as a result, was separated from his tag team partner Jesse who remained on SmackDown.

==== Slam Master J (2009–2010) ====
Jesse appeared on the June 26 edition of SmackDown, during the first televised edition of Cryme Tyme's Word Up internet show. During this segment, Jesse reprised his thug-wannabe mannerisms from his Ray Geezy gimmick. On the July 24 episode of SmackDown, Jesse was officially renamed Slam Master J; his first match with this moniker was on the August 7 episode of SmackDown, defeating Charlie Haas. He then formed a tag team with Jimmy Wang Yang and faced The Hart Dynasty on two occasions and lost. They picked up their first win as a team against Charlie Haas and Mike Knox. Gordy was soon taken off television until he reappeared at WrestleMania XXVI, where he took part in the 26-man Battle Royal that also involved his former partner Festus, now known as Luke Gallows, but both were unsuccessful as the match was won by Yoshi Tatsu.

Gordy was released from his WWE contract on April 22, 2010 along with several other talents. Following his departure from WWE, Gordy retired from professional wrestling and began working as a police officer in Atlanta, Georgia.

== Personal life ==
Gordy is the son of professional wrestler Terry Gordy (1961–2001), the brother of professional wrestler Miranda Gordy, and the cousin of professional wrestler Richard Slinger.

On April 2, 2016, Gordy made an appearance at the 2016 WWE Hall of Fame ceremony during his father Terry's induction as part of The Fabulous Freebirds, accepting the award on his behalf.

== Championships and accomplishments ==
- Georgia Championship Wrestling
  - NWA Georgia Junior Heavyweight Championship (1 time)
- NWA Wildside
  - NWA Wildside Heavyweight Championship (1 time)
- North American Wrestling Association
  - NAWA Georgia Heavyweight Championship (1 time)
- Pro Wrestling Illustrated
  - PWI ranked him #147 of the top 500 singles wrestlers in the PWI 500 in 2008

== See also ==
- Jesse and Festus
