= Bunkhouse Stampede (1988) =

Jim Crockett Promotions pay-per-view event

The Bunkhouse Stampede Finals
- Promotion(s): National Wrestling Alliance; Jim Crockett Promotions
- Date: January 24, 1988
- City: Uniondale, New York
- Venue: Nassau Coliseum
- Attendance: 6,000
- Buy rate: 200,000

Pay-per-view chronology
← Previous; Starrcade	Next → The Great American Bash

The Bunkhouse Stampede Finals was the third Bunkhouse Stampede professional wrestling event produced by Jim Crockett Promotions under the National Wrestling Alliance (NWA) banner. It was the only Bunkhouse Stampede event to air as a pay-per-view (PPV) event. The event took place on January 24, 1988 from the Nassau Veterans Memorial Coliseum in Uniondale, New York in direct competition with the WWF's Royal Rumble television special.

In the main event, Dusty Rhodes won a Steel Cage Bunkhouse Stampede. On the undercard Ric Flair successfully defended the NWA World Heavyweight Championship against Road Warrior Hawk, Nikita Koloff successfully defended the NWA World Television Championship against Bobby Eaton and Barry Windham lost the short-lived NWA Western States Heritage Championship to Larry Zbyszko.

== Storylines ==
The event comprised four professional wrestling matches that involved wrestlers from pre-existing rivalries, plots and storylines that were played out on Worldwide, Pro and World Championship Wrestling–Jim Crockett Promotions (JCP)'s television programs. Wrestlers portrayed a hero, villain or a tweener as they followed a series of events that built tension, and culminated in a wrestling match or a series of matches.

The main match heading into the event was the Steel Cage Bunkhouse Stampede. By December 26, Big Bubba Rogers, Arn Anderson, Tully Blanchard, The Barbarian and The Warlord, Lex Luger, Road Warrior Animal, Steve Williams, Mighty Wilbur and Ivan Koloff had qualified for the Bunkhouse Stampede final. The final participant was determined by a Wildcard Bunkhouse Stampede on January 1, which was won by Dusty Rhodes. Mighty Wilbur was injured and therefore was unable to compete in the final. No explanation was ever given as to why Steve Williams and Big Bubba Rogers did not compete in the final.

Another rivalry heading into the event was between Ric Flair and Road Warrior Hawk for the NWA World Heavyweight Championship. At Starrcade, Flair defeated Ron Garvin to win the title. On December 6, The Road Warriors (Hawk and Animal) defeated Flair and Arn Anderson by disqualification. On January 24 episode of World Championship Wrestling, Flair was scheduled to defend the title against Hawk at Bunkhouse Stampede.

On January 3 episode of World Championship Wrestling, Jim Cornette, the manager of the NWA United States Tag Team Champions Midnight Express (Bobby Eaton and Stan Lane) predicted that Eaton would be the next NWA United States Heavyweight Champion and Lane the next NWA World Television Champion, resulting in a rivalry between Midnight Express and the US Champion Dusty Rhodes and the Television Champion Nikita Koloff. Rhodes and Koloff competed against Midnight Express in several Steel Cage matches at live events. This resulted in a Television Championship match between Koloff and Eaton at Bunkhouse Stampede.

== Event ==
=== Preliminary matches ===
When the live broadcast commenced, Nikita Koloff defended the NWA World Television Championship against Bobby Eaton in the opening match. Koloff started focusing on Eaton's arm but Eaton gained the control of the match. The action continued back and forth with both men exchanging moves. Eaton eventually regained momentum and performed a Diving Elbow Drop and a Hammerlock. Koloff finally got out of the Hammerlock but Eaton attacked Koloff again and performed a Missile Dropkick. Eaton applied another Hammerlock and Koloff got out of the move and tried to hit a Lariat, which he called Russian Sickle. However, Eaton caught Koloff's arm and applied a third Hammerlock. The action continued until Koloff performed a Russian Sickle and the twenty–minute time limit of the match expired. As a result, Koloff retained the title.

In the next match, Barry Windham defended the NWA Western States Heritage Championship against Larry Zbyszko. Windham controlled the earlier part of the match until Zbyszko began focusing on Windham's injured knee and continued to attack it. Windham eventually made a comeback by performing a Powerslam. He tried to perform a Diving Elbow Drop but Zbyszko continued to attack his knee. Windham countered with a Dropkick and tried to perform a Backdrop Suplex but he suffered some pain in his knee that allowed Zbyszko to get a near-fall. Windham eventually gained control of the match by performing a Gutwrench Suplex and applied a Sleeper Hold. Zbyszko held the ropes to be released and rolled out, causing Windham to follow him. Zbyszko shoved him into the ringpost. Windham tried to perform a Lariat but Zbyszko collapsed and Windham fell to the floor. Zbyszko took advantage and smashed Windham's face on a ringside table. The action returned to the ring where Windham tried to perform a Sunset Flip but Zbyszko countered it with a near-fall. Zbyszko tried to perform a Swinging Neckbreaker but Windham countered it into a Backslide. Zbyszko tried to perform a Piledriver but Windham countered with a Back Body Drop, allowing both men to get knocked out. Zbyszko missed a charge on Windham into the corner, allowing Windham to hit ten punches in the corner. The referee was attacked by Zbyszko and Windham tried to pin him with a roll-up. Zbyszko's valet Baby Doll gave him her shoe and Zbyszko hit him with the shoe to win the championship.

In the final match on the undercard Ric Flair defended the NWA World Heavyweight Championship against Road Warrior Hawk. Hawk dominated Flair with his power moves, while Flair's moves seemed to have no effect on Hawk until Flair hit Hawk with a Low Blow, raked his eyes and delivered a Knee Drop. Flair started getting control of the match until Hawk performed a Shoulder Neckbreaker. After Hawk missed a Jumping Fist Drop, Flair applied a Figure Four Leglock. Flair eventually broke the hold and tried to climb the top rope but Hawk tossed him down. Hawk performed a Clothesline on both Flair and the referee. Flair was clotheslined outside the ring and also pulled Hawk outside the ring, where Hawk hit him with a powerslam. Hawk performed a Superplex and tried to pin him but Flair's manager J. J. Dillon broke the attempt with a chair. Hawk's manager Paul Ellering woke up the referee as Flair nailed Hawk with a chair, for which he was disqualified. However, Flair retained the title.

=== Main event match ===
The main event was a Steel Cage Bunkhouse Stampede. The objective of the match was to throw the opponent out of the cage door or send him out via the top of the cage for the elimination. The participants were Tully Blanchard, Arn Anderson, The Barbarian, The Warlord, Dusty Rhodes, Ivan Koloff, Lex Luger and Road Warrior Animal. Animal eliminated first Koloff over the top of the cage, and then Warlord through the cage door, but was himself eliminated by The Barbarian after a Big Boot. Blanchard and Anderson double-teamed Luger and tried to eliminate him through the cage door but all three men were eliminated at the same time. Rhodes and Barbarian were the remaining participants and continued to fight each other. Barbarian hit Rhodes with a Diving Headbutt but was unable to eliminate him. Both men climbed the over the top of the cage, where Rhodes hit Barbarian with two Bionic Elbows to win the Bunkhouse Stampede for the third consecutive time.

=== Dark match ===
After the event aired live on PPV, Sting and Jimmy Garvin defeated The Sheepherders (Butch Miller and Luke Williams) by disqualification in a non-televised tag team match. In prior weeks of TV it was mentioned that The Rock and Roll Express would face The Sheepherders at this event, but no explanation was ever given as to why this did not occur, although behind the scenes, both Morton and Gibson had left the promotion the day before.

== Aftermath ==
The Bunkhouse Stampede event met little success and was badly criticized. Especially, its booking was not appreciated due to Dusty Rhodes winning every Bunkhouse Stampede Battle Royal. Along with Rhodes' booking, the event was marred by the tickets having the wrong start time on them (a 6:30 start time was incorrectly advertised as 7:30, causing a majority of the fans to miss the first half of the event).

The event gave birth to a new rivalry between Lex Luger and the Four Horsemen, a group Luger left in late 1987 after losing the NWA United States Heavyweight Championship. On Clash of the Champions I, Luger and Barry Windham defeated Horsemen members, the NWA World Tag Team Champions Arn Anderson and Tully Blanchard to win the title. On April 23 edition of World Championship Wrestling, Luger and Windham lost the title back to Anderson and Blanchard when Windham betrayed Luger and joined the Horsemen. Luger became the #1 contender for Horsemen's leader Ric Flair's NWA World Heavyweight Championship, unsuccessfully challenging him for the title at The Great American Bash and Starrcade.

Larry Zbyszko would hold the NWA Western States Heritage Championship for all of 1988, eventually being vacated when Zybszko went to the AWA after Ted Turner's buyout of JCP. Baby Doll would be fired after her then-husband Sam Houston went to the WWF, which was considered a conflict of interest, and ending a short-lived feud with her former charge, Dusty Rhodes, and Zbyszko would join forces with Gary Hart and Al Perez. The Warlord and Barbarian would team up to form The Powers of Pain with their manager, Paul Jones, and began feuding with the Road Warriors. Nikita Koloff would go on to lose the NWA World TV Title to Mike Rotunda of the Varsity Club and would hold the title for over a year, then Koloff began to gradually step away from wrestling when his then-wife Mandy fell ill. Jimmy Garvin would team up with his kayfabe brother Ron Garvin in a feud with Kevin Sullivan and the Varsity Club over Jimmy's valet, Precious, while The Sheepherders would fall into the mid-card, finally making it to the final match for the vacant NWA United States Tag Team Championship in November, 1988 before leaving for the WWF and becoming The Bushwhackers.

== Results ==
No.	Results	Stipulations	Times
1	Nikita Koloff (c) vs. Bobby Eaton (with Jim Cornette) ended in a time-limit draw	Singles match for the NWA World Television Championship	20:00
2	Larry Zbyszko (with Baby Doll) defeated Barry Windham (c)	Singles match for the NWA Western States Heritage Championship	19:16
3	Road Warrior Hawk (with Paul Ellering) defeated Ric Flair (c) (with J. J. Dillon) by disqualification	Singles match for the NWA World Heavyweight Championship	21:39
4	Dusty Rhodes defeated Arn Anderson, The Barbarian, Ivan Koloff, Lex Luger, Road Warrior Animal, Tully Blanchard and The Warlord	Steel Cage Bunkhouse Stampede	26:21
5^{D}	Jimmy Garvin and Sting defeated The Sheepherders (Butch Miller and Luke Williams) by disqualification	Tag team match	11:45
(c) / – the champion(s) heading into the match; D / – this was a dark match
