= Starrcade '87: Chi-Town Heat =

1987 Jim Crockett Promotions pay-per-view event

- VHS cover featuring various wrestlers
- Promotion(s): National Wrestling Alliance; Jim Crockett Promotions
- Date: November 26, 1987
- City: Chicago, Illinois
- Venue: UIC Pavilion
- Attendance: 8,000
- Buy rate: 20,000
- Tagline: Chi-Town Heat-Glory Bound

Pay-per-view chronology
← Previous; First	Next → The Bunkhouse Stampede Finals

Starrcade chronology
← Previous; 1986	Next → 1988

Starrcade '87: Chi-Town Heat was the fifth annual Starrcade professional wrestling supercard event produced by Jim Crockett Promotions (JCP) under the National Wrestling Alliance (NWA) banner. It took place on November 26, 1987, from the UIC Pavilion in Chicago, Illinois. It was the first NWA event to be broadcast live on pay-per-view, and was also shown on closed circuit narrowcast at 100 different venues, as previous supercards had. This was the first major JCP event to feature wrestlers from the Universal Wrestling Federation, which was purchased by JCP shortly before the event. The event had a secondary theme, "Glory Bound", referring to Ron Garvin's quest for glory as NWA World Heavyweight Champion.

The main event was a steel cage match between Ric Flair and Ron Garvin for the NWA World Heavyweight Championship. After the event, Flair feuded with Sting. The event also included a steel cage match between Dusty Rhodes and Lex Luger for the NWA United States Heavyweight Championship, a match between The Road Warriors and the team of Tully Blanchard and Arn Anderson for the NWA World Tag Team Championship, and a match between Nikita Koloff and Terry Taylor to unify the NWA World Television Championship and the UWF World Television Championship.

== Storylines ==
Ron Garvin as the NWA World Heavyweight Champion

The event involved wrestlers from pre-existing scripted feuds and storylines. Wrestlers portrayed villains or, heroes in the scripted events to build tension and lead to a wrestling match.

Starrcade was headlined by Ric Flair and Ron Garvin for the NWA World Heavyweight Championship. Garvin went into the event as champion after a short reign because Jim Crockett wanted the drama of a Flair title win at Starrcade.

Jim Crockett Promotions had previously aired Starrcade on closed-circuit television while the World Wrestling Federation (WWF) aired its events on pay-per-view. The 1987 Starrcade was the first pay-per-view event of the National Wrestling Alliance. To compete, the WWF introduced the Survivor Series event, and held it on the same night. The WWF warned pay-per-view providers that if they carried Starrcade '87, they would not be allowed to carry WrestleMania IV. As a result, few of them carried Starrcade, which drew a 3.30 buy rate compared to Survivor Series with a 7.0 buy rate.

== Event ==
Other on-screen personnel
Role:	Name:
Commentator	Jim Ross
Commentator	Tony Schiavone
Interviewer	Bob Caudle
Interviewer	Missy Hyatt
Interviewer	Jack Gregory
Referee	Earl Hebner
Referee	Tommy Young
Ring Announcer	Tom Miller

The pay-per-view opened with Eddie Gilbert, Rick Steiner, and Larry Zbyszko taking on Sting, Michael Hayes, and Jimmy Garvin. Sting, Hayes, and Garvin had the early advantage until a front powerslam from Zbyszko on Garvin. Sting tagged in and fought off Zbyszko, Gilbert, and Steiner, but Zbyszko raked his eyes. Zbyszko, Gilbert, and Steiner had the advantage until Hayes executed a small package on Gilbert. As Hayes had Gilbert in the sunset flip, the match ended in a time-limit draw.

Next, Steve Williams defended the UWF Heavyweight Championship against Barry Windham. The match went back and forth until Williams applied a side headlock. After breaking the hold, Williams attempted to jump over Windham, but Windham's head hit Williams in the groin. Windham leaped at Williams but fell out of the ring, as Williams avoided his opponent. After Windham came back into the ring, Williams pinned Windham with an Oklahoma roll to retain the title.

The third match was a Skywalkers match between The Midnight Express (Bobby Eaton and Stan Lane) (accompanied by Jim Cornette and Big Bubba Rogers) and The Rock 'n' Roll Express (Ricky Morton and Robert Gibson). The match started with Rogers attacking Morton, as Gibson was double-teamed on the scaffold. Rogers attempted to climb the scaffold, but Morton attacked him, Lane, and Eaton with Cornette's tennis racket. Eaton fought back by throwing powder at Morton and Gibson. The teams went back and forth until Lane climbed under the scaffold. Morton followed and pushed Lane off. Morton and Gibson attacked Eaton until he fell, and The Rock 'n' Roll Express won the match.

After this, NWA World Television Champion Nikita Koloff faced UWF World Television Champion Terry Taylor (accompanied by Eddie Gilbert) to unify the titles. The match started with Koloff targeting Taylor's left arm. Taylor gained the advantage by sending Koloff's head into the guard rail outside. Taylor then targeted Koloff's left arm and shoulder with the use of the ring post. Gilbert attacked Koloff's left knee with a steel chair, and Taylor applied the figure four leglock. After Taylor accidentally knocked Gilbert off the apron, Koloff performed a Russian Sickle and pinned Taylor to unify the titles.

In the fifth match, Tully Blanchard and Arn Anderson defended the NWA World Tag Team Championship against local favorites, The Road Warriors (Hawk and Animal). The Road Warriors took the early advantage. As Hawk had Blanchard in the gorilla press, Anderson attacked Hawk's left knee, which the champions continued to target with the use of the ring post and a chair. Anderson attempted a seated senton, but Hawk raised his knees and hit Anderson's groin. The Road Warriors regained the advantage, and Blanchard knocked referee Tommy Young outside the ring. Animal threw Anderson over the top rope with a back body drop. The Road Warriors then performed a Doomsday Device on Anderson, who was pinned by Animal, with replacement referee Earl Hebner counting the pin. However, the original referee reversed the decision and disqualified the Road Warriors for throwing Anderson over the top rope. Blanchard and Anderson won the match and retained the title.

Ric Flair, after winning the NWA World Heavyweight Championship for the fifth time

Next, Lex Luger (accompanied by J. J. Dillon) defended the NWA United States Heavyweight Champions against Dusty Rhodes in a steel cage match. Johnny Weaver held the key to the cage. Rhodes would be suspended in storyline for 90 days if he lost. The match went back and forth until Luger sent Rhodes headfirst into the cage and ground his head against it. Luger attacked Rhodes's left arm until Rhodes fought back and applied the sleeper hold. Dillon attacked Weaver and took the key. As the referee attempted to prevent Dillon unlocking the door, Luger ran into him, and Dillon threw in a chair. Luger attempted to pick it up, and Rhodes performed a DDT on the chair. Rhodes then pinned Luger to win the match and the title.

In the main event, Ron Garvin lost the NWA World Heavyweight Championship to Ric Flair. Garvin had the early advantage with forehand chops, mounted punches, and the Garvin Stomp. After exchanging chops, Flair hit Garvin with a low blow and an inverted atomic drop. Flair targeted the left leg, hit a shin breaker and applied the figure four leglock. Garvin fought back after blocking Flair's attempts to send him headfirst into the cage. Garvin hit Flair into the cage, applied a figure four leglock, and performed a diving crossbody. Garvin punched Flair, who countered with an inverted atomic drop. Flair then reversed an Irish whip, sent Garvin headfirst into the cage, and pinned him to win the match and the title.

== Aftermath ==
Ron Garvin, who had a reign of two months as a NWA World Heavyweight Champion, never regained the title. He then joined his stepson Jimmy in a feud with Kevin Sullivan that ran until the 1988 Great American Bash. Ric Flair remained NWA champion for over a year. In early 1988, Sting, who was rising to stardom, challenged Flair to a match at Clash of the Champions I. Flair accepted, and fought Sting for 45 minutes to a time-limit draw, making Sting a top star. Sting wrestled many more matches against Flair, as well as the other members of the Four Horsemen, and their rivalry continued for over ten years. The Road Warriors feuded with the Four Horsemen through most of 1988.

At the end of 1987, the UWF was closed and its titles retired. Lead UWF announcer Jim Ross joined the World Championship Wrestling announce team with Tony Schiavone and David Crockett.

Larry Zbyszko and Baby Doll joined forces and went after Barry Windham's Western States Heritage title, which he won at the Bunkhouse Stampede in January 1988, then went after Dusty Rhodes' United States Heavyweight title in an angle where Baby Doll (Rhodes' valet in 1986) had "incriminating photos" that she was going to use to force Rhodes to defend his title, but Baby Doll was fired and the angle was scrapped. Zbyszko held the Western States title until he went to the AWA at the beginning of 1989 (after JCP was sold to Ted Turner).

Meanwhile, Nikita Koloff lost his NWA World TV Title to Mike Rotunda in January 1988. He dropped down the card during his wife's illness, appearing less and less on TV, and took time off in November 1988 to care for her until her death in 1989.

Rhodes retained the United States Heavyweight title until April 1988, when he was stripped of the belt and suspended for 120 days after attacking NWA President Jim Crockett Jr. at a taping of World Championship Wrestling when Tully Blanchard assaulted Magnum T. A. and Rhodes came to his defense, hitting Blanchard repeatedly with a baseball bat, then inadvertently hitting Crockett when he intervened. Lex Luger was kicked out of the Horsemen after blaming J. J. Dillon for losing the title, and teamed with Barry Windham to capture the NWA World Tag Team titles from Blanchard and Anderson. Windham then turned on Luger to join the Horsemen, capturing the vacant United States Heavyweight title in a tournament and feuding with Rhodes, who never held another NWA title.

The Road Warriors moved on to a feud with Paul Jones' new team, the Powers of Pain (Warlord and Barbarian), during which Road Warrior Animal's orbital eye socket was injured during a "test of strength" weightlifting contest, which forced the Warriors and Dusty Rhodes to vacate their NWA World Six-Man Tag Team Championship, which was won by the Powers of Pain and Ivan Koloff. The feud lasted until the summer of 1988, when the Powers of Pain left for the WWF after refusing to work a series of scaffold matches with the Warriors during the Great American Bash.

Big Bubba Rogers left the NWA to join the World Wrestling Federation as the "Big Boss Man" where he had high-profile feuds, most notably with Hulk Hogan.

After Starrcade was outperformed by Survivor Series, Jim Crockett Promotions (JCP) and the World Wrestling Federation (WWF) continued to compete. When JCP held the Bunkhouse Stampede pay-per-view event in January 1988, the WWF held the Royal Rumble event, a television special, on the same night as Bunkhouse Stampede. In return, JCP held the first Clash of the Champions, also a television special, on the same night as WrestleMania IV. Clash of the Champions was a success, and drew a large cable rating.

== Results ==
No.	Results	Stipulations	Times
1	Eddie Gilbert, Larry Zbyszko and Rick Steiner (with Baby Doll) vs. Jimmy Garvin, Michael Hayes and Sting (with Precious) ended in a time-limit draw	Six-man tag team match	15:00
2	Steve Williams (c) defeated Barry Windham	Singles match for the UWF Heavyweight Championship	06:50
3	The Rock 'n' Roll Express (Ricky Morton and Robert Gibson) defeated The Midnight Express (Bobby Eaton and Stan Lane) (with Big Bubba Rogers and Jim Cornette)	Skywalkers match	10:23
4	Nikita Koloff (NWA) defeated Terry Taylor (UWF) (with Eddie Gilbert)	Unification match for the NWA and UWF World Television Championships	18:58
5	Tully Blanchard and Arn Anderson (c) (with J. J. Dillon) defeated The Road Warriors (Animal and Hawk) (with Paul Ellering) by disqualification	Tag team match for the NWA World Tag Team Championship	13:27
6	Dusty Rhodes defeated Lex Luger (c) (with J. J. Dillon)	Steel Cage match for the NWA United States Heavyweight Championship	16:28
7	Ric Flair (with J. J. Dillon) defeated Ron Garvin (c)	Steel Cage match for the NWA World Heavyweight Championship	17:38
(c) / – the champion(s) heading into the match
