= NWA Western States Heritage Championship =

Professional wrestling championship

Details
- Promotion: Universal Wrestling Federation; Jim Crockett Promotions; World Championship Wrestling
- Date established: June 20, 1987
- Date retired: January 20, 1989
Statistics
- First champion: Barry Windham
- Final champion: Larry Zbyszko
- Longest reign: Larry Zbyszko (362 days)
- Shortest reign: Barry Windham (218 days)
- Oldest champion: Larry Zbyszko (37 years, 46 days)
- Youngest champion: Barry Windham (26 years, 351 days)
- Heaviest champion: Larry Zbyszko (233 lb (233 lb))
- Lightest champion: Barry Windham (220 lb (220 lb))

The NWA Western States Heritage Championship was a short-lived National Wrestling Alliance (NWA) title in Jim Crockett Promotions (JCP) that was filled via a tournament in the Universal Wrestling Federation in 1987 and defended in JCP and World Championship Wrestling (WCW) until it was abandoned in 1989. The belt was created as a tribute to the NWA Western States Heavyweight Championship, a retired territorial championship based in Amarillo, Texas; despite this, the NWA Western States Heritage Championship was never actually defended in Amarillo and most title defenses occurred on the East Coast or in the Midwest.

The NWA Western States Heavyweight Championship was revived in 2015 by NWA Vendetta Pro Wrestling, using a belt design identical to that of the NWA Western States Heritage Championship. NWA Vendetta Pro Wrestling recognized all former Western States Champions — including the Western States Heritage titleholders. The NWA Western States Heavyweight Championship was retired and replaced with the Vendetta Pro Western States Championship on September 8, 2017.

== Reigns ==
Key
No.	Overall reign number
Reign	Reign number for the specific champion
Days	Number of days held

No.	Champion	Championship change			Reign statistics		Notes	Ref.
No.	Champion	Date	Event	Location	Reign	Days	Notes	Ref.
National Wrestling Alliance: Jim Crockett Promotions (JCP)
1	Barry Windham	June 20, 1987	Live event	Houston, TX	1	218	Defeated Black Bart in a tournament to fill the title.	
2	Larry Zbyszko	January 24, 1988	Bunkhouse Stampede	Uniondale, NY	1	362		
National Wrestling Alliance: World Championship Wrestling (WCW)
—	Deactivated	January 20, 1989	—	—	—	—	The championship retired when Larry Zbyszko left to work for the American Wrestling Association (AWA). Zbyszko's final match in WCW was on January 16, 1989 in Chicago. He debuted 4 days later in the AWA on January 20, 1989, after which WCW retired the championship.	

== See also ==
- Jim Crockett Promotions
- National Wrestling Alliance
- Universal Wrestling Federation
