= Barry Windham =

American professional wrestler (born 1960)

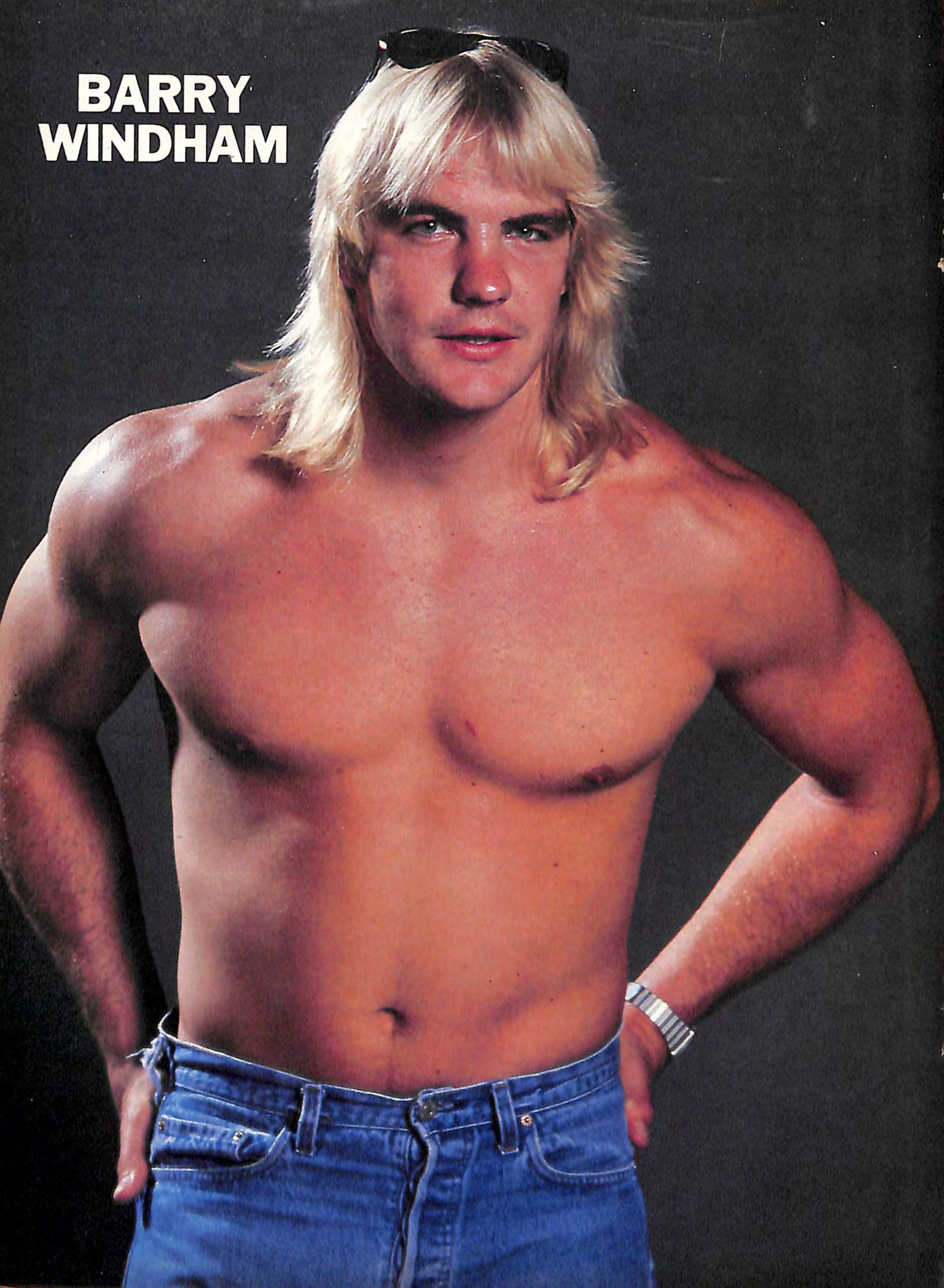
- Windham, c. 1986

Personal information
- Born: Barry Clinton Windham; July 4, 1960 (age 66) Sweetwater, Texas, U.S.
- Spouse: Kebra Windham (divorced)
- Children: 3
- Relatives: Blackjack Mulligan (father); Kendall Windham (brother); Mike Rotunda (brother-in-law); Bray Wyatt (nephew); Bo Dallas (nephew)

Professional wrestling career
- Ring name(s): Barry Windham; Dirty Yellow Dog; Blackjack Mulligan Jr. The Widowmaker; The Lone Wolf; Barry Windam; The Stalker; Blackjack Windham
- Billed height: 6 ft 6 in (198 cm)
- Billed weight: 275 lb (125 kg)
- Billed from: Sweetwater, Texas; The Environment
- Trained by: Blackjack Mulligan; Harley Race
- Debut: 1979
- Retired: February 26, 2010

Barry Clinton Windham (born July 4, 1960) is an American retired professional wrestler. The son of wrestler Blackjack Mulligan, he is best known for his appearances with the National Wrestling Alliance (NWA) and the World Wrestling Federation (WWF).

In NWA/WCW, he was a one-time NWA World Heavyweight Champion, a one-time United States Heavyweight Champion, a one-time Television Champion, a one-time Western States Heritage Champion, a four-time NWA/WCW World Tag Team Champion and a one-time NWA United States Tag Team Champion with Ron Garvin. In the WWF, he was a two-time World Tag Team Champion with his brother-in-law, Mike Rotunda. Windham was inducted into the WWE Hall of Fame twice, first in 2012 as a member of The Four Horsemen and then again in 2024 as a member of The U.S. Express.

== Professional wrestling career ==
=== Early years (1979–1984) ===
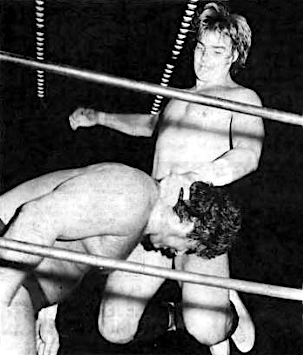
Windham going for a forearm smash against Don Muraco during a 1980 match

Windham was trained by his father Blackjack Mulligan and world champion Harley Race. He debuted on November 27, 1979, against his future manager J.J. Dillon in San Angelo, Texas when he was 19 years old. Much of his early career was in the NWA's Championship Wrestling from Florida territory where Gordon Solie was the head announcer. He was a fan favorite for most of the early and middle periods of his career, having great success in singles and tag action. Windham had notable feuds with Kevin Sullivan and his army. With his brother-in-law Mike Rotunda, Windham formed a tag team in 1984. The duo captured the NWA Florida United States Tag Team Championship four times between March and May 1984.

=== World Wrestling Federation (1984–1985) ===
Rotunda and Windham were signed by World Wrestling Federation (WWF) in October 1984. They debuted in WWF as babyfaces on the November 17, 1984 edition of Maple Leaf Wrestling defeating Mohammed Saad and Bobby Bass. Their tag team was named "The U.S. Express". They quickly made impact in WWF's tag team division as they beat North South Connection (Dick Murdoch and Adrian Adonis) for their first WWF Tag Team Championship on January 21, 1985, at a house show in Hartford, CT. At the first-ever WrestleMania, US Express dropped the titles to The Iron Sheik and Nikolai Volkoff. On the July 13 edition of Championship Wrestling, they beat Sheik and Volkoff for their second and final WWF Tag Team Championship, which they lost to Dream Team (Greg Valentine and Brutus Beefcake) in Philadelphia at The Spectrum on August 24.

=== Championship Wrestling from Florida; American Wrestling Association; (1986–1987) ===
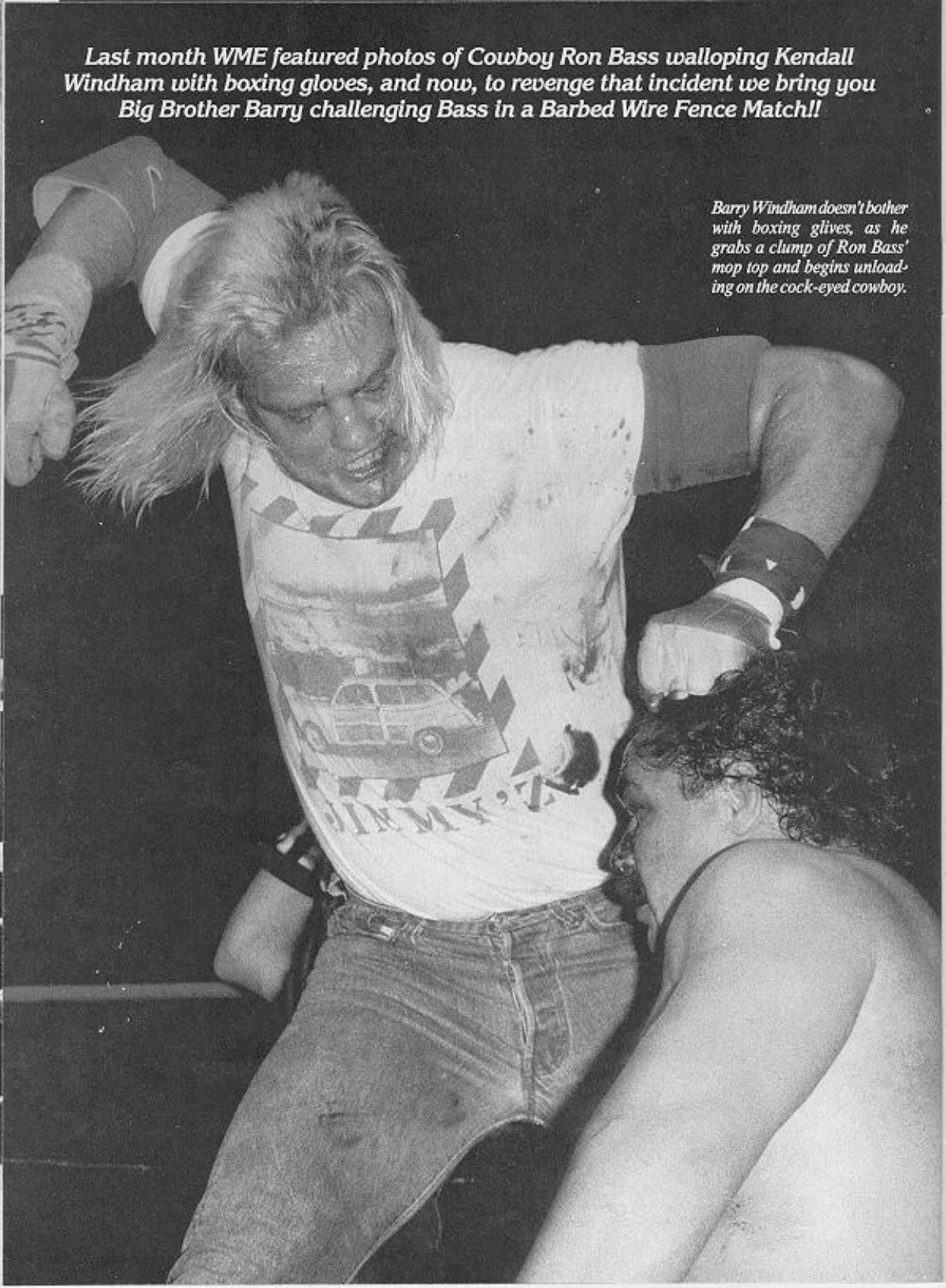
Windham (top) winds up to punch Ron Bass (bottom), circa 1987

After departing from the WWF, Windham worked in the National Wrestling Alliance territory Championship Wrestling from Florida (CWF) as a babyface, where most notably he wrestled in the main event of Battle of the Belts II for the NWA World Heavyweight Championship against Ric Flair, and feuded over the NWA Florida Heavyweight Championship with Ron Bass. Windham and Rotundo also wrestled at WrestleRock 86 show in the American Wrestling Association (AWA) where they defeated The Fabulous Ones.

=== Jim Crockett Promotions (1986–1989) ===
==== Early appearances (1986–1988) ====
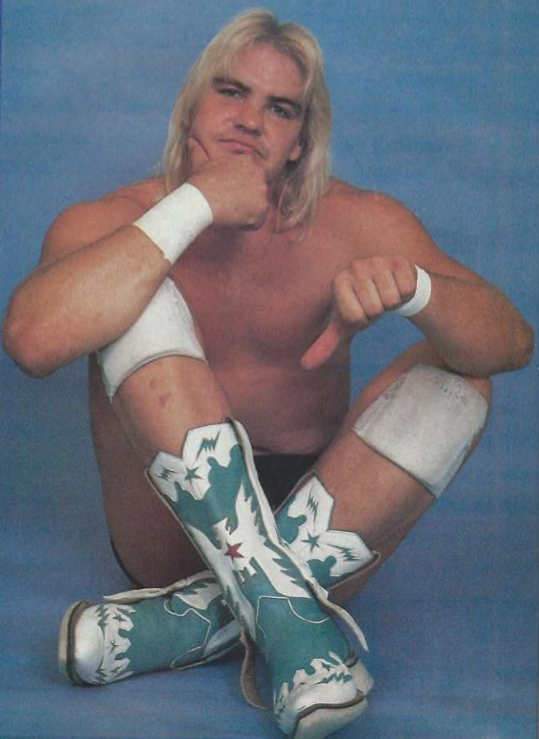
Windham, c. 1986

In the fall of 1986, Windham shifted to NWA's Jim Crockett Promotions (JCP) territory as a babyface where he had many memorable matches with "Nature Boy" Ric Flair. These included matches going to 60 minute time limit draws and even some extending beyond an hour of action. He then shifted back to the tag team division, forming a successful pairing with Ron Garvin. On December 9, 1986, Windham and Garvin defeated Ivan Koloff and Khrusher Khruschev. for the U.S. tag team championship. Their biggest feud as a team was with The Midnight Express (Bobby Eaton and Stan Lane), managed by Jim Cornette.

The Midnight Express were never able to beat Windham and Garvin for the titles. Windham and Garvin eventually lost these titles to Ivan Koloff and Dick Murdoch in the spring of 1987, shortly before the annual Jim Crockett Memorial Tag Team Tournament (also known as the Crockett Cup). After Koloff and Murdoch were stripped of the titles, however, the Midnight Express were able to beat Windham and Garvin in the finals of the subsequent tournament to fill the title vacancy. At this time, Windham also formed an alliance with Lex Luger, who would turn his back on Windham shortly afterward when Luger had aspirations of joining The Four Horsemen. Rather than enter the tournament as a team, Windham and Garvin were split up. Ronnie Garvin instead teamed up with his kayfabe brother Jimmy Garvin (Ronnie was Jimmy's legit stepfather). Rather than have Windham partner up with someone in the tournament, he was booked to face Ric Flair for the NWA World Championship in what would be another classic match between the two. Flair defeated Windham with a controversial pinfall after a little over 25 minutes of action.

Windham spent the rest of 1987 in midcard status. On June 20, 1987, Windham defeated Black Bart in a tournament final to win the short-lived NWA Western States Heritage Championship, becoming first champion. He defended the title against the likes of Rick Steiner, Big Bubba Rogers. The title was also recognized by Bill Watts' Universal Wrestling Federation (UWF). He began climbing up the ranks of UWF. At JCP's Starrcade 1987: Chi-Town Heat, he lost to UWF Heavyweight Champion "Dr. Death" Steve Williams. In 1988, Windham began rising in the JCP ranks again. He started off by dropping the Western States Heritage Title to Larry Zbyszko at Bunkhouse Stampede.

==== The Four Horsemen (1988–1989) ====
In early 1988, Windham reunited with Luger and together they formed a tag team called "The Twin Towers". On March 27, 1988, at Clash of the Champions I they won the NWA World Tag Team Championship from Arn Anderson and Tully Blanchard. A few weeks later, on April 20, in Jacksonville, Florida, a swerve took place where Windham betrayed Luger causing the team to lose the titles back to Blanchard and Anderson. Windham turned heel and joined Ric Flair's stable, the Four Horsemen (which also consisted of Anderson and Blanchard) and his heel turn was considered shocking at the time. In addition, he began using a black glove as well as the clawhold as his finisher, which was a signature move of his father Blackjack Mulligan. He went back to singles competition and defeated Nikita Koloff in a tournament final to win the vacant NWA United States Heavyweight Championship after then-champion Dusty Rhodes was suspended. Windham was a dominant US Champion, who reigned for nine months. He defended the title against the likes of Brad Armstrong, Dusty Rhodes, Sting and Bam Bam Bigelow before dropping it to Lex Luger at Chi-Town Rumble in February 1989. His contract expired in March 1989.

=== World Wrestling Federation (1989) ===
Windham returned to the WWF in June 1989 as the "Widowmaker", a heelish cowboy character. He went undefeated for four months, primarily wrestling at house shows and on WWF Wrestling Challenge. He was planned to have been on Randy Savage's Survivor Series team, but was replaced by the Earthquake as Windham left the company in October 1989 due to his family's involvement in a counterfeiting scandal.

=== World Championship Wrestling (1990–1994) ===
==== The Four Horsemen (1990–1991) ====
On May 5, 1990, Windham made a surprise return to World Championship Wrestling, interfering in a match between US Champion Lex Luger and World Champion Ric Flair. Following the appearance he re-united with the Four Horsemen which at that point consisted of Ric Flair, Arn Anderson, Sid Vicious, and Ole Anderson. At the time, Ole Anderson was only semi-active and permanently became their manager once Windham joined. The first match back for the former United States champion came fifteen days later when he teamed with Ric Flair and Arn Anderson to defeat Rick Steiner and The Road Warriors at a house show in Atlanta, GA.

He defeated Doug Furnas on June 13, 1990 Clash of the Champions XI: Coastal Crush. He spent most of the time that year in tag team matches with the other Horsemen as partners.

At Halloween Havoc 1990, Windham was involved in a controversial match between Sid Vicious and then NWA World Heavyweight Champion Sting. Vicious appeared to pin Sting and win the championship, but it was actually Windham who was dressed like Sting. Once the hoax was noticed, the match was restarted and the real Sting defeated Sid Vicious. Windham spent the rest of the year teaming with Arn Anderson in the continuation of a feud between the Four Horsemen and then NWA World Tag Team Champions, Doom. At Starrcade 1990: Collision Course, Windham and Anderson wrestled Doom to a no contest in a Street Fight when a member of each team was pinned.

In 1991, Windham continued teaming with Arn Anderson and Sid Vicious. Windham feuded with Brian Pillman in the spring of 1991, culminating in a taped fist match at SuperBrawl I: Return of the Rising Sun, which Windham won.

As the middle of the year approached, controversy erupted when WCW World Heavyweight Champion, Ric Flair, was fired by the company, thus vacating the title. It is rumored that Flair was going to drop the title to Windham at a TV taping in Columbus, Georgia, but was fired before it could happen. To crown a new champion Windham then faced number-one contender Lex Luger at The Great American Bash 1991 in a steel cage match, which Luger won after outside interference by heel manager Harley Race and bodyguard Mr. Hughes. Luger became the top villain in WCW while Windham, double-crossed by fellow heels Race and Hughes, began a slow move to babyface, confirmed three weeks later on August 5 at the St Joseph Civic Center when he and Ron Simmons - after taking turns to rescue each other from attacks by Luger and his entourage - formed an alliance because, in Windham's words, "it looks like we've got the same enemies."

==== Championship reigns; various feuds (1991–1992) ====
In October 1991, Windham formed a tag team with Dustin Rhodes and feuded with WCW World Tag Team Champions The Enforcers (Arn Anderson and Larry Zbyszko). At Halloween Havoc 1991: Chamber of Horrors, Anderson and Zbyszko slammed a car door on Windham's hand, breaking it, and putting him out of action for a while (including that night's Chamber of Horrors match). That led to Ricky Steamboat stepping in as Rhodes's partner at Clash of the Champions XVII that November. Steamboat and Rhodes won the titles. Windham, meanwhile, came back a couple of months later to feud with Anderson, Zbyszko, and the rest of what was now the Dangerous Alliance. Windham would feud with TV Champion "Stunning Steve" Austin in the spring of 1992. On the May 9, 1992 edition of Saturday Night, he defeated Austin in a two out of three falls match to win the WCW World Television Championship. He dropped the title to Austin on the June 13 edition of WorldWide.

On a taped edition of Saturday Night on September 2, Windham teamed with Dustin Rhodes to defeat Steve Williams and Terry Gordy for the unified WCW/NWA World Tag Team Championship (their NWA title reign is not recognized by NWA); the match aired on October 3. They held the belts for about two months before losing them to Ricky Steamboat and Shane Douglas on November 18 at Clash of the Champions XXI. As Rhodes refused to go for the pinfall after an accidental low blow on Steamboat, Windham turned heel on Rhodes after the match.

At the end of the year, Windham teamed with Brian Pillman, who had also turned heel, to pursue the titles he and Rhodes lost, but ended up losing to Steamboat and Douglas at Starrcade 1992: Battlebowl/The Lethal Lottery II.

==== NWA World Heavyweight Champion (1993–1994) ====
In January 1993 Windham pursued the NWA World Championship held by The Great Muta. He defeated Muta for the NWA World Heavyweight Championship at SuperBrawl III. Ric Flair, who returned to WCW that night, tried to present Windham with the title belt, but when Windham saw it was Flair trying to put the belt around his waist, he took the belt and walked away. Flair and Anderson tried to recruit Windham to join the Horsemen again, but Windham declined and called himself a "Lone Wolf", starting a feud with Flair and Anderson. Windham successfully defended the title against Anderson at Slamboree 1993: A Legend's Reunion.

Following a successful title defense against 2 Cold Scorpio, Windham dropped the NWA belt to Flair at Beach Blast, and during the match suffered a knee injury that saw him rupture all four knee ligaments and tear his meniscus. After reconstructive surgery, Windham returned ten months later where he again took on Flair again at Slamboree 1994: A Legend's Reunion for the WCW World Heavyweight Championship. For weeks leading up to the match, WCW led fans to believe it would be Hulk Hogan coming to challenge Flair (as indeed he would a month later), saying a 6'7", 300 lbs blond haired former World Champion was the masked man that Col. Robert Parker's Stud Stable was bringing in to challenge Flair as his "Stable Stud". It was revealed to be Barry Windham. Flair won again and Windham reinjured the knee that he had surgery on, then dropped out of sight for over two years.

Originally the WWF wanted Windham to return and once again team with his brother in-law Mike Rotunda (who by then wrestled as Irwin R. Schyster) and form the "New Money Inc.", as part of Ted DiBiase's Million Dollar Corporation. Windham and Schyster were supposed to feud with Lex Luger and Tatanka (who Schyster was feuding with), but however his knee injury forced him out of the deal with WWF and Tatanka replaced Windham in the feud with Luger.

=== Return To The WWF (1996–1998) ===
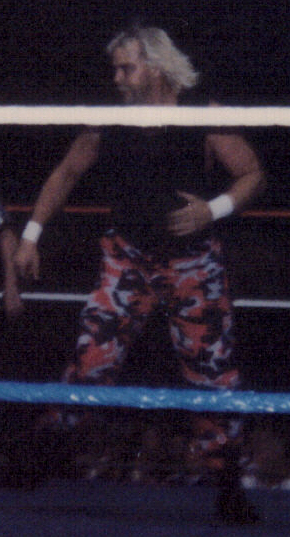
Windham as "The Stalker" in the WWF, 1996

==== The Stalker (1996) ====
Windham would again return to the WWF, making his first appearance in a vignette on the August 10, 1996 edition of WWF Superstars. His first match back came nine days later, when he defeated Justin Bradshaw in a dark match at a Monday Night RAW taping in Wheeling, WV. Windham portrayed a deranged "Forest Stalker" gimmick called "The Stalker". He was to be wearing camouflage face paint, while originally being supposed to feud with Marc Mero, but the angle was dropped due to Mero's request. Originally, his PPV debut was to be at Mind Games, but did not happen for unknown reasons. In Your House 11: Buried Alive was originally to hype "The Stalker" gimmick however the announcers acknowledged that he was Barry Windham.

The Stalker was introduced with little fanfare as a babyface. For a short time, he renewed his feud with Dustin Rhodes (known by that time as Goldust). In Windham's only pay-per-view appearance with this gimmick, he was eliminated from a Survivor Series match at Survivor Series 1996 by Goldust. His last appearance as the "Stalker" gimmick was booked to be at In Your House 14: Revenge of the 'Taker's pre-show Free for All against Flash Funk. However, he was replaced by The Sultan for unknown reasons.

==== The New Blackjacks (1997–1998) ====
In February 1997, Windham turned heel and formed The New Blackjacks with Justin "Hawk" Bradshaw. Windham dyed his hair and moustache black. The tag team was a tribute to the original Blackjacks (Windham's father, Mulligan, and Jack Lanza). The team had opportunities for the World Tag Titles, but no success. That team didn't last long, as Windham turned on Bradshaw to join Jim Cornette's "NWA faction" in January 1998. He wore a brown cowboy vest and boots. The angle was scrapped months later. His last WWF TV appearance was a loss to Vader on Monday Night Raw May 11 and his last WWF match losing to Bradshaw on May 16, 1998, at a house show. Windham left for WCW again.

=== World Championship Wrestling (1998–1999) ===
In his last World Championship Wrestling run, Barry Windham was brought back to WCW in late-1998 by Eric Bischoff. Barry was then loosely associated with Bischoff's nWo Hollywood for a while before forming a tag team with Curt Hennig. At SuperBrawl IX, Hennig and Windham defeated Chris Benoit and Dean Malenko in the finals of a tag team tournament to win the vacant WCW World Tag Team Championship.

Windham reinjured his knee during this period, but would return as part of "The West Texas Rednecks" in mid-1999. They were supposed to be a heel group to feud with rapper Master P's "No Limit Soldiers", but the southern fans of WCW cheered the Rednecks, going against what WCW management and booking had hoped for, and the angle was eventually dropped. The group consisted of his brother Kendall Windham, Curt Hennig, and Bobby Duncum Jr.; Duncum was replaced by Curly Bill after he was injured and shortly before the group was disbanded and the Rednecks storyline was dropped. On the August 23, 1999 edition of Nitro, the Windham brothers defeated Harlem Heat (Booker T and Stevie Ray) to win their final WCW World Tag Team Championship, before losing the titles back to Harlem Heat at Fall Brawl 1999. Both Barry and Kendall were shortly after released by WCW.

=== Late career (1999–2005, 2010) ===
In late 1999, Windham worked for Ted DiBiase's promotion WXO and World Wrestling Council (WWC), where he won the latter's World Tag Team Championship in Puerto Rico with brother Kendall.

By 2000, Windham began competing on the American independent scene in the Florida-based Turnbuckle Championship Wrestling, where he won their Heavyweight Championship and held it for the better part of a year. He also became part of the Xtreme Horsemen in a stable with Steve Corino and C. W. Anderson. They feuded with Dusty and Dustin Rhodes.

Windham's last wrestling appearances were at Major League Wrestling's War Games, a U.S. Express reunion with Mike Rotunda in a loss to Larry Zbyszko and "The Outlaw" Ron Bass at WrestleReunion I on January 29, 2005, and on the "WrestleMania Rewind" episode of WWE Monday Night Raw on March 10, 2008, appearing with Rotunda to reform the U.S. Express one final time against The Iron Sheik and Nikolai Volkoff in a rematch from WrestleMania I, although the match never commenced.

Windham worked as a producer for WWE. In 2007, he appeared on the Ric Flair and the Four Horsemen DVD. Barry was also seen during the 2007 WWE Hall of Fame broadcast, sitting next to former partner John "Bradshaw" Layfield. In June 2007, Windham did the introduction of SuperBrawl III for WWE 24/7. On December 31, 2008, he was released by the WWE.

Windham wrestled his final match in February 2010 for American Combat Wrestling.

Windham appeared at the 2012 WWE Hall of Fame with Ric Flair, J.J. Dillon, Arn Anderson, and Tully Blanchard as The Four Horsemen were inducted.

Windham appeared at the 2024 WWE Hall of Fame alongside his former tag team partner Mike Rotunda, as The U.S. Express were inducted.

== Personal life ==
He is the maternal uncle of WWE wrestlers Bray Wyatt and Bo Dallas.

On October 26, 2011, it was reported that he was hospitalized for either a very serious stroke or a massive heart attack and was in an ICU unit. He was found at his ranch by his brother-in-law Mike Rotunda. His family confirmed that Windham suffered a heart attack. His father Blackjack Mulligan posted a message to Facebook saying "I have a son near death".

On December 2, 2022, Windham experienced another massive heart attack while at the Atlanta airport, which led to cardiac arrest and required an emergency procedure to save his life and he was again hospitalized and has since recovered.

== Championships and accomplishments ==
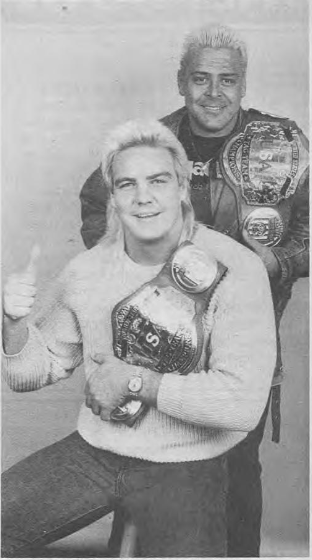
Windham and Ron Garvin as NWA United States Tag Team Champions, c. 1987

- All Japan Pro Wrestling
  - World's Strongest Tag Determination League Exciting Award (1983) – with Ron Fuller
- Championship Wrestling from Florida
  - NWA Florida Global Tag Team Championship (1 time) – with Ron Bass
  - NWA Florida Heavyweight Championship (6 times)
  - NWA Florida Tag Team Championship (2 times) – with Mike Graham (1) and Scott McGhee (1)
  - NWA Florida Television Championship (3 times)
  - NWA North American Tag Team Championship (Florida version) (1 time) – with Mike Graham
  - NWA Southern Heavyweight Championship (Florida version) (2 times)
  - NWA United States Tag Team Championship (Florida version) (4 times) – with Mike Rotunda
- Jim Crockett Promotions / World Championship Wrestling
  - NWA Worlds Heavyweight Championship (1 time)
  - WCW World Television Championship (1 time)
  - NWA Western States Heritage Championship (1 time)
  - NWA United States Heavyweight Championship (1 time)
  - NWA United States Tag Team Championship (1 time) – with Ron Garvin
  - NWA World (Mid-Atlantic)/WCW World Tag Team Championship (4 times) – with Lex Luger (1), Dustin Rhodes (1), Curt Hennig (1), and Kendall Windham (1)
- NWA All-Star Wrestling (North Carolina)
  - NWA World Tag Team Championship (1 time) - with Tully Blanchard^{1}
- NWA New England
  - NWA New England Heavyweight Championship (1 time)
- NWA Southern Championship Wrestling
  - NWA Southern Heavyweight Championship (Tennessee version) (2 times)
- Pro Wrestling Illustrated
  - PWI Most Improved Wrestler of the Year (1982)
  - PWI ranked him #11 of the top 500 singles wrestlers in the PWI 500 in 1993
  - PWI ranked him #35 of the top 500 singles wrestlers of the "PWI Years" in 2003
  - PWI ranked him #48 of the top 100 tag teams of the "PWI Years" with Mike Rotunda in 2003
  - PWI ranked him #87 of the top 100 tag teams of the "PWI Years" with Dustin Rhodes in 2003
  - PWI ranked him #90 of the top 100 tag teams of the "PWI Years" with Lex Luger in 2003
- Turnbuckle Championship Wrestling
  - TCW Heavyweight Championship (2 times)
- World Wrestling Council
  - WWC World Tag Team Championship (1 time) – with Kendall Windham
- World Wrestling Federation/WWE
  - NWA North American Heavyweight Championship (1 time)
  - WWF Tag Team Championship (2 times) – with Mike Rotunda
  - WWE Hall of Fame (2 times)
    - Class of 2012 as a member of The Four Horsemen
    - Class of 2024 as a member of The U.S. Express
- Wrestling Observer Newsletter
  - Rookie of the Year (1980)
  - Match of the Year (1986) vs. Ric Flair on February 14

^{1}The title was won by Windham and Blanchard in a small North Carolina NWA affiliated promotion. However, it should not be confused with the more prominent NWA All-Star Wrestling promotion that operated out of Vancouver, British Columbia from the early '60s to the late '80s.
