= Larry Zbyszko =

American professional wrestler (born 1951)

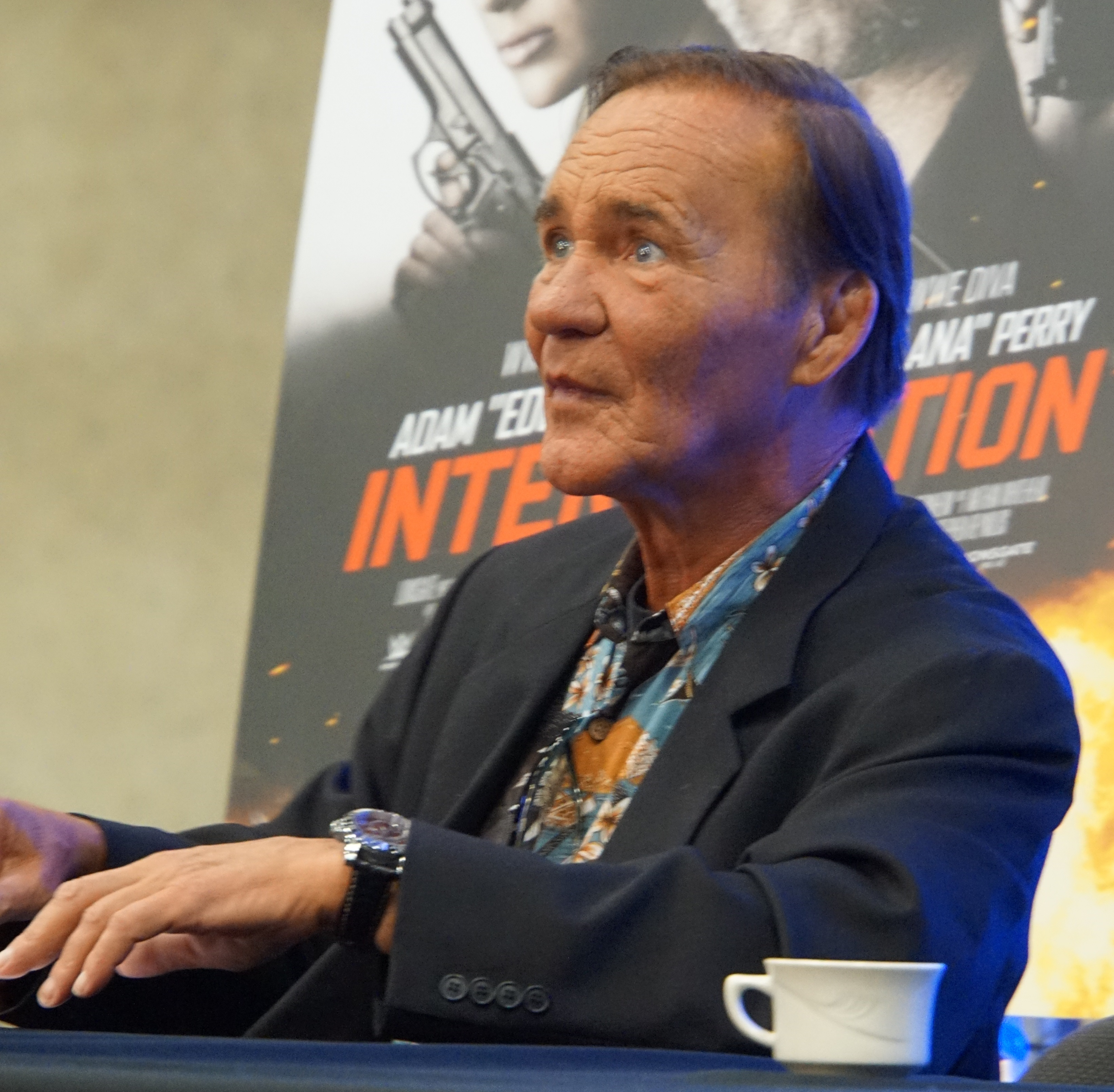
- Zbyszko in 2016

Personal information
- Born: Lawrence Whistler; December 5, 1951 (age 74) Chicago, Illinois, U.S.
- Spouse: Kathleen Gagne
- Children: 4
- Family: Verne Gagne (father-in-law); Greg Gagne (brother-in-law)

Professional wrestling career
- Ring name: Larry Zbyszko
- Billed height: 5 ft 9 in (175 cm)
- Billed weight: 233 lb (106 kg)
- Billed from: Pittsburgh, Pennsylvania
- Trained by: Bruno Sammartino; Geeto Mongol
- Debut: 1972
- Retired: 2015

Lawrence Whistler (born December 5, 1951), better known by the ring name Larry Zbyszko, is an American retired professional wrestler. He is perhaps best known for his feud with his mentor, Bruno Sammartino, during the early 1980s as well as his work as a wrestler and color commentator for World Championship Wrestling. Among other accolades, he is a two-time world champion having twice held the AWA World Heavyweight Championship. Zbyszko was inducted into the WWE Hall of Fame on March 28, 2015, by Sammartino.

== Professional wrestling career ==
=== Early career (1972–1974) ===
Whistler trained under Bruno Sammartino after cutting his collegiate wrestling career at Penn State University short. He debuted in 1972 as the babyface "Larry Zbyszko", with his name a tribute to 1920s Polish American wrestler Stanislaus Zbyszko. He initially wrestled in the Pittsburgh area in 1972, appearing on the local wrestling program Studio Wrestling, before receiving bookings in Vancouver with NWA All-Star Wrestling in 1973. Studio Wrestling shut down in 1974.

=== World Wide Wrestling Federation (1974–1981) ===
He debuted in the World Wide Wrestling Federation in 1974 before working in both California and Japan in 1975. Zbyszko was one of the attractions in the 1976 Latin America Wrestling Alliance World Heavyweight championship, held in Guatemala City, under José Azzari promotions. Three days after the tournament ended (with Mil Máscaras winning the title, defeating José Azzari in the final), an earthquake destroyed much of Guatemala.

Zbyszko returned to the WWWF in 1976 and formed a tag team with Tony Garea, with whom he won the WWWF World Tag Team Championship on November 21, 1978, in Allentown, Pennsylvania. Their reign lasted until March 6, 1979, when they were defeated by the Valiant brothers in Allentown.

Zbyszko feuded with Bugsy McGraw, Abdullah the Butcher and Superstar Billy Graham in addition to wrestling Killer Kowalski and Baron Mikel Scicluna. In 1978 he summarized his mat-based ringwork with the statement, "I just believe in science over brawn."

At the end of the decade, Zbyszko became frustrated with his inability to shed his label as Bruno Sammartino's protégé. He challenged Sammartino to an exhibition match, claiming this was the only way he could step out of Sammartino's shadow. Sammartino respectfully declined Zbyszko's challenge, but he eventually agreed after Zbyszko threatened to retire. The mentor and his pupil faced off on a televised match in Allentown on January 22, 1980. Sammartino dominated the early stages of the match, to Zbyszko's obvious and mounting frustration. After he unintentionally threw Zbyszko out of the ring, in a gesture of sportsmanship Bruno separated the ropes to clear space for Larry to return to the canvas. With Bruno vulnerable and unprepared, an irate Zbyszko delivered a cheap-shot to the midsection and proceeded to attack Bruno viciously. His assault ended with Zbyszko swinging a wooden chair into Sammartino's head, leaving Bruno face down in a pool of blood in the middle of the ring. The attack instantly turned Zbyszko into a reviled heel.

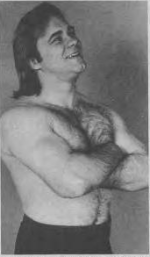
Zbyszko in 1981

Zbyszko was struck with an iron pole following a match with Ivan Putski, and was stabbed in the buttock following a match with Pedro Morales in the Washington Avenue Armory in Albany, New York. After turning against Sammartino, Zbyszko was approached by the WWWF's "Unholy Trio" of managers (Fred Blassie, The Grand Wizard, and "Captain" Lou Albano), but he decided to continue wrestling without a manager. Sammartino and Zbyszko fought one another repeatedly in a lengthy feud that stretched throughout 1980. In the course of the feud, Zbyszko began referring to himself as "The New Living Legend" (a reference to Sammartino, who was often addressed as "The Living Legend"). The feud culminated in a steel cage match at Showdown at Shea at Shea Stadium in Flushing, New York on August 9, 1980, that saw Sammartino defeat Zbyszko in front of an audience of 36,295.

=== All Japan Pro Wrestling; International Wrestling Federation (1981–1982) ===
Zbyszko left the WWF in spring 1981. In mid-1981, he toured Japan with All Japan Pro Wrestling.

In early to mid-1982, Zbyszko appeared with the International Wrestling Federation, where he faced Bruno Sammartino Jr. in a series of matches. In October 1982, he made another tour of Japan with All Japan Pro Wrestling.

=== Georgia Championship Wrestling (1983–1984) ===
In March 1983, Zbyszko joined the Georgia Championship Wrestling territory of the National Wrestling Alliance, where he began claiming to have retired Bruno Sammartino (Sammartino had retired from full-time competition in 1981). Zbyszko initially feuded with Tim Woods and Paul Orndorff, whom he was unable to defeat for the NWA National Heavyweight Championship. After Killer Tim Brooks defeated Orndorff for the title on March 20, 1983, Zbyszko immediately offered him US$25,000 for the title, which Brooks accepted. His reign lasted until April 30 of that year, when NWA President Bob Geigel stripped Zbyszko of the title due to the manner in which he had acquired it. A tournament was held for the vacant title, which Zbyszko entered. He defeated Mr. Wrestling II in the tournament final on May 6, 1983, in Atlanta, Georgia to regain the title. His second reign lasted until September 25, 1983, when he lost to Brett Wayne in Atlanta. He continued to wrestle in Georgia until April 1984.

=== American Wrestling Association (1984–1987) ===
In March 1984, Zbyszko joined the Minneapolis, Minnesota-based American Wrestling Association. He was awarded the newly created AWA America's Championship in January 1985 and engaged in a lengthy feud with Sgt. Slaughter, who defeated him for the title on June 21, 1985, in Chicago, Illinois. Throughout the feud, Zbyszko drew the ire of fans by fleeing the ring and stalling for minutes at a time whenever Slaughter gained an advantage (in an April 2004 interview, Zbyszko claimed that the longest he ever stalled for was sixteen minutes).

Zbyszko feuded with Nick Bockwinkel throughout 1986, losing to him in a Texas death match at Rage in a Cage on April 28, 1986. In the course of the feud, he also vied with Bockwinkel's ally Ray Stevens and boxer Scott LeDoux. Zybszko lost to LeDoux in a boxing match at WrestleRock '86 on April 20, 1986, and fought him to a double count out at Battle by the Bay on June 28, 1986.

On May 2, 1987, Zbyszko helped Curt Hennig defeat Nick Bockwinkel for the AWA World Heavyweight Championship by handing him a roll of dimes to knock Bockwinkel out with. He was suspended "for life" by the AWA as a result of an assault on Bockwinkel during Bockwinkel's rematch with Hennig in July 1987. As Bockwinkel retired shortly after the incident, Zbyszko began claiming to have retired both Bockwinkel and Bruno Sammartino.

=== Jim Crockett Promotions/World Championship Wrestling (1987–1989) ===
In November 1987, Zbyszko joined Jim Crockett Promotions, where he was managed by Baby Doll. He began feuding with Barry Windham, and on January 24, 1988, in Uniondale, New York he defeated Windham for the NWA Western States Heritage Championship. After Baby Doll left Zbyszko he gained a new manager in Gary Hart, who placed him in a tag team with Al Perez. Perez and Zbyszko feuded with Kendall Windham and Dustin Rhodes. In November 1988, Ted Turner bought Crockett and became World Championship Wrestling.

It was also during this time that Hart was asking for NWA World Title shots for both Zbyszko and Perez. It was claimed by Hart and even announcer Jim Ross that Zbyszko and Perez both had the ability to beat Flair for the title, but neither received title shots and the NWA quickly dropped the overtures. Crockett Promotions was under new ownership and both Zbyszko and Perez were essentially left without an angle. Zbyszko signed with the AWA in January 1989 and the NWA Western States Heritage Championship, which Zbyszko still held at that point, was subsequently retired.

=== American Wrestling Association (1989–1990) ===
Zbyszko took part in an eighteen-man battle royal in Saint Paul, Minnesota on February 7, 1989, to fill the vacant AWA World Heavyweight Championship. By stalling and avoiding confrontations with other wrestlers, Zbyszko was able to remain in the match until only two men remained: himself and Tom Zenk. The two men fought for several minutes. When Zenk went for a pin, referee Gary DeRusha inexplicably entered the ring to make the count. Zbyszko kicked out and the two continued in what now appeared to be a conventional wrestling match. DeRusha ended up taking a bump and was unable to make the three count when Zenk covered Zbyszko for the pin. As DeRusha slowly recovered, Zenk continued to dominate the match. As he attempted a flying body press, however, Zbyszko managed to catch him in mid-air and deliver a fallaway slam, throwing him over the top rope and to the ground below. Zbyszko was thus the new AWA World Heavyweight Champion.

Early in his title reign, Zbyszko would feud with Wahoo McDaniel and Sgt. Slaughter. He would face Greg Gagne on June 23, 1989, at War in the Windy City, and David Sammartino, who he defeated at the Tri-State Winter Challenge on January 27, 1990. He then began feuding with Mr. Saito, who defeated him for the AWA World Heavyweight Championship on February 10, 1990, at Super Fight In Tokyo Dome during a tour of Japan. Zbyszko regained the title at SuperClash 4 on April 8, 1990, in Saint Paul and successfully defended it against The Trooper, Brad Rheingans, and Nikita Koloff (who he defeated on May 5, 1990, at Twin Wars '90) toward the end of his reign. He was stripped of the title after leaving the AWA for World Championship Wrestling on December 12, 1990, and the AWA declared bankruptcy in 1991, making Zbyszko the last man to reign as AWA World Heavyweight Champion.

=== Return to World Championship Wrestling (1990–2000) ===
In December 1990, Zbyszko returned to the NWA. Zbyszko initially teamed with Terrence Taylor, a member of The York Foundation, but was not recruited to the stable. Zbyszko was paired with Arn Anderson as the Enforcers in the late summer of 1991. After Scott Steiner, one-half of the WCW World Tag Team Champions, was injured, the titles were vacated on July 18, 1991, and placed on the line in an eight-man tag team tournament. The tournament finals were held on September 5, 1991, at Clash of the Champions XVI: Fall Brawl and pitted the Enforcers against Rick Steiner and Bill Kazmeier. At the outset of the event, the Enforcers struck Kazmeier with a weight during a weightlifting demonstration, injuring his ribs. This enabled them to defeat Steiner and Kazmeier for the titles in the main event.

At Halloween Havoc, The Enforcers began feuding with Barry Windham and Dustin Rhodes, and broke Windham's hand by slamming the door of his car on his hand. Following this act, Zbyszko gave himself the sobriquet the "Cruncher". Windham was replaced by Ricky Steamboat, and at Clash of the Champions XVII on November 19, 1991, in Savannah, Georgia, the Enforcers lost the titles to Steamboat and Rhodes.

In December 1991, the Enforcers joined Paul E. Dangerously's Dangerous Alliance, which also included Rick Rude, "Stunning" Steve Austin, Bobby Eaton and Madusa. They feuded with Ricky Steamboat, Dustin Rhodes, Barry Windham, Nikita Koloff, Sting and the WCW World Heavyweight Champion Ron Simmons. On May 17, 1992, at WrestleWar 1992: WarGames, the Dangerous Alliance lost a WarGames match to their rivals after Zbyszko accidentally hit Eaton in the arm with the turnbuckle that he had dismantled, forcing Eaton to submit as a result of the pain. As a result of his blunder, Zbyszko was fired from the stable by Dangerously, turning him into a face for the first time since 1980. He briefly feuded with Austin and Eaton before retiring from full-time competition to become a color commentator. One of his first appearances as a commentator occurred at Starrcade alongside of Missy Hyatt. As a commentator, Zbyszko began referring to himself simply as "The Living Legend", as many WCW fans were unfamiliar with his feud with Bruno Sammartino. He also hosted an interview segment, "Larry Z's Legends" on WCW television which only lasted a few weeks.

In March 1994, Zbyszko began hosting WCW Pro, alongside Dusty Rhodes and Gordon Solie. Shortly thereafter, Lord Steven Regal began harassing Zbyszko, prompting him to return to the ring. On May 2, 1994, in Atlanta, Zbyszko defeated Regal for the WCW World Television Championship. He held the title until June 23, 1994, when Regal regained the belt in Charleston, South Carolina.

In 1996, Zbyszko was promoted to the WCW Monday Nitro broadcast team, where he announced during the first hour with Tony Schiavone. In 1997, he was antagonized by New World Order (nWo) member Scott Hall, but Hall opted not to face Zbyszko. Zbyszko remained in the broadcast booth for most of 1997, occasionally refereeing matches involving Hall and the nWo. On October 13, 1997, Zbyszko got involved in a WCW Tag Team Championship match between the Steiner Brothers and Scott Hall and Syxx (subbing for an injured Kevin Nash) and counted the ensuing fall for the Steiner Brothers who became the champions. This reign was official despite Zbyszko not being an official referee, a role he previously played in Scott Hall's match against Lex Luger at Halloween Havoc (1997). On December 28, 1997, at StarrCade 1997, Zbyszko returned to the ring for a match against Bischoff for control of WCW Monday Nitro with Bret Hart acting as special referee. Hart ensured that the nWo did not interfere, and Zbyszko won the match, regaining control of Nitro for WCW. He continued to feud with Hall and his lackey, Louie Spicolli, culminating in a match between Zbyszko and Hall at Souled Out 1998 on January 24, 1998. Zbyszko won the match by disqualification after Dusty Rhodes betrayed him, joining the nWo.

Zbyszko went back to commentating, becoming part of the main Thunder announce team in April along with Mike Tenay, leaving Nitro. On December 6, 1999, when he faced Curt Hennig in a retirement match on Nitro and lost by disqualification. He returned in January 2000 as a member of the Old Age Outlaws with Terry Funk, Arn Anderson and Paul Orndorff to feud with the revived nWo, then returned to commentary in February until he was released from his WCW contract in late 2000 just before WCW was bought by the WWF in March 2001.

=== Independent circuit (2000–2003) ===
After being released from World Championship Wrestling Zbyszko was rumored to be the replacement for Jerry Lawler as the commentator for Monday Night Raw in early 2001 after Lawler quit the company. Zbyszko did an interview with Live Audio Wrestling saying he wanted the job. These rumors never materialized as Paul Heyman would go on to become the color commentator for Monday Night Raw until Lawler returned to the company later that year.

In 2001 Zbyszko wrestled several matches for Dusty Rhodes's Turnbuckle Championship Wrestling promotion.

In late 2001, Zbyszko requested that World Wrestling Entertainment cease referring to Chris Jericho as "The Living Legend", claiming that this infringed upon his common law trademark. After WWF refused to comply, with chairman Vince McMahon personally addressing Jericho as "The Living Legend" during a televised broadcast, Zbyszko launched a lawsuit against WWF. In addition, he challenged McMahon to a shoot fight during a 2002 World Wrestling All-Stars pay-per-view which never happened.

In 2002, Zbyszko had a short feud with Chris Harris in the Nashville, Tennessee-based USA Championship Wrestling promotion. On March 2, 2002, Zbyszko defeated Harris for the USA North American Heavyweight Championship. He held the title until March 30, 2002, when Harris regained the belt at the Tojo Yamamoto Memorial Show. On August 27, 2005, at WrestleReunion in Valley Forge, Pennsylvania, Zbyszko faced Diamond Dallas Page, with the provision that he would receive five minutes alone in the ring with the sixty-nine-year-old Bruno Sammartino if he won. Page knocked Zbyszko out with his signature Diamond Cutter, however, then pulled Zbyszko on top of him, thus giving him the win by pinfall. Sammartino then entered the ring and began throttling the still-prone Zbyszko until he was dragged away.

=== Total Nonstop Action Wrestling (2003–2006) ===
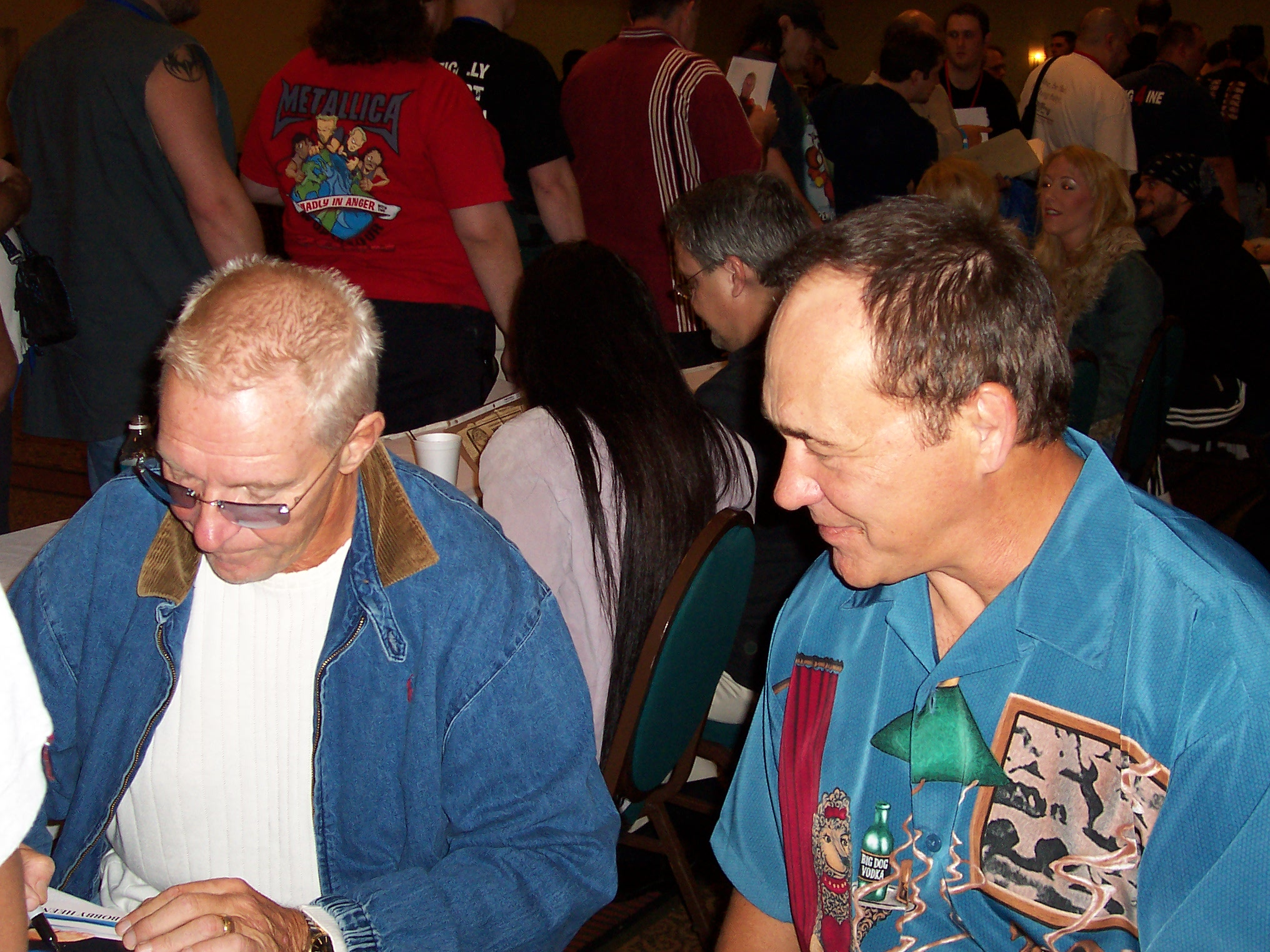
Zbyszko (right) signing autographs in 2005 with Bobby Heenan

Zbyszko debuted in Total Nonstop Action Wrestling on January 15, 2003, and delivered a speech in which he exhorted the roster to respect tradition. This sparked a feud with A.J. Styles, who was not receptive to Zbyszko's requests. On January 29, 2003, Zbyszko faced Styles in a ten-minute-long match with the stipulation that, should Styles be unable to pin him twice in that time, he would become Styles's manager. Styles was only able to pin Zbyszko once, and Zbyszko managed him for a short time before booker Vince Russo cancelled the angle and Zbyszko left the promotion. He returned for one night on August 6, 2003, losing to Kid Kash following interference from Abyss.

Zbyszko made a full-time return to TNA on June 23, 2004, assisting Ron Killings in his feud with Jeff Jarrett. On July 14, 2004, Killings, Zbyszko, Dusty Rhodes, Konnan and B.G. James defeated Jarrett, Ken Shamrock and "The Elite Guard" (Shawn Hernandez, Chad Collyer and Onyx) in a "ten-man guitar on a pole match".

Along with Harley Race and Terry Funk, Zbyszko was appointed to a body known as the Championship Committee. The Committee would watch matches on TNA Impact!, most of which had a ten-minute time limit, and determine a winner in the eventuality of a draw. As on practise few professional wrestling matches end in a draw, the Committee was gradually phased out.

In February 2005, Zbyszko joined Planet Jarrett, Jarrett's dominant heel stable. He disappeared several weeks later.

On June 19, 2005, at Slammiversary, the returning Zbyszko was named Director of Authority, replacing Dusty Rhodes. His first act as DOA was to give Jeff Jarrett's place in the King of the Mountain match later that night to Raven. At Sacrifice on August 14, Zbyszko responded to Jarrett's request for a shot at the NWA World Heavyweight Championship by informing him that he would receive a title shot if he won his tag team match that night, but would be banned from receiving a title shot for a year if he lost the match. As Jarrett's partner, Rhino, won the match, neither stipulation was applicable.

Zbyszko remained neutral for several months, but in October 2005 he became exasperated with Raven, who continually accused him of robbing the NWA World Heavyweight Championship and refusing to grant him a rematch. At Genesis on November 13, Zbyszko told Raven to resign from TNA or have his life "made hell". After Raven refused to resign, Zbyszko forced him to wrestle P.J. Polaco. Much to Zbyszko's chagrin, Raven defeated Polaco. Nevertheless, Zbyszko continued his personal crusade against Raven, and to that end booked him into a Raven's House of Fun Match, again with an unknown opponent, for the December 3 episode of Impact!. The opponent turned out to be the entire Diamonds in the rough stable (Simon Diamond, Elix Skipper, and David Young). Despite interference from Cassidy Riley on Raven's behalf, he was pinned and lost the match.

Raven went on to defeat his former tag team partner Chris K. at Turning Point. At Final Resolution on January 15, 2006, Raven was scheduled to face a mystery opponent, with the stipulation that he would receive a shot at the NWA World Heavyweight Championship if he was victorious, but would be fired if he was defeated. Raven lost to the returning Sean Waltman after Zbyszko, who refereed the match after the original referee was knocked unconscious, distracted Raven so that Waltman could deliver an X Factor and then counted to three despite Raven placing his foot on a ring rope. Following the match, Zbyszko ordered the TNA security to escort Raven from "my arena", then mocked Raven until he was confronted by Jackie Gayda about an undisclosed issue.

At Lockdown on April 23, 2006, the debuting Christy Hemme handed commentator Mike Tenay an envelope containing a message from "TNA management" stating that Zbyszko had been placed on probation due to his conduct, while Raven had been reinstated. Raven then entered the arena and approached the ring, causing Zbyszko to evade him until he was removed by security guards. At Victory Road on July 16, 2006, Zbyszko lost to Raven in a hair versus hair match. On the October 5 edition of iMPACT he booked a match where the man who was pinned would be fired. He interfered in the match after he hit Eric Young with a golf club. Jim Cornette booked a match at Bound for Glory between him and Young where the loser would be fired. He would then go on to lose the match to Eric Young at Bound for Glory, and he was fired a week later.

=== Later career (2006–2015) ===
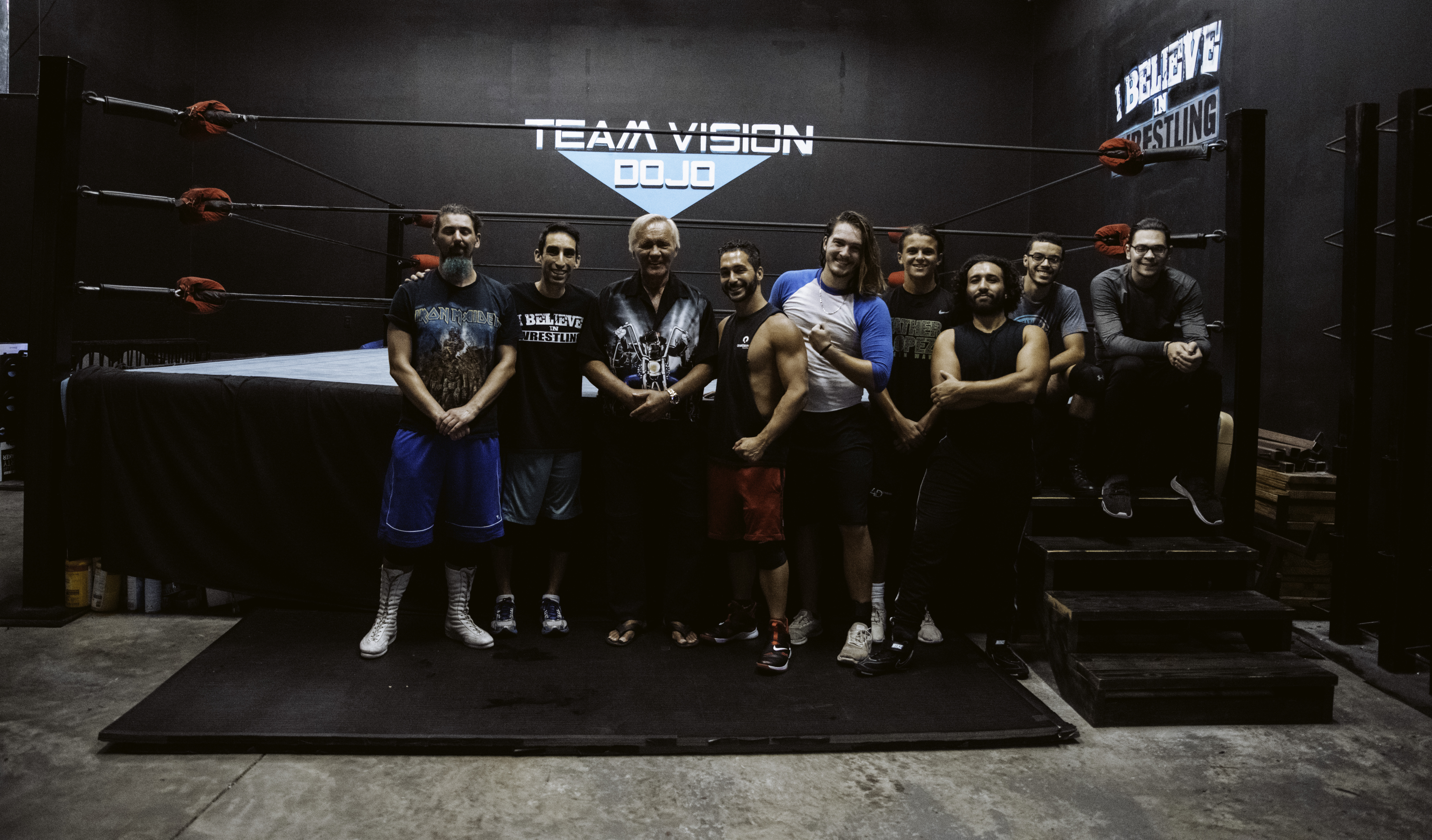
Zbyszko with several wrestlers in the Team Vision Dojo

Zbyszko returned to the independent circuit and claimed the AWA Superstars of Wrestling World Heavyweight Championship in AWA Superstars of Wrestling. Zbyszko started rallying for what he claimed was rightfully his since mid-2007. The situation heated up immediately after the then AWA Superstars of Wrestling board of directors stripped Masato Tanaka of the World's title. Zbyszko, through his newly named "representative" Mister Saint Laurent and legal representation, started filing documentation, to the new AWA Superstars of Wrestling Management Team, proving he had never lost the title in 1991 when Verne Gagne's American Wrestling Association entered into bankruptcy. After considerable deliberation and review of the bankruptcy file from the early 1990s, the AWA agreed with Zbyszko that he did indeed never actually lose the title. Accordingly, Zbyszko was once again the recognized AWA Superstars of Wrestling World Heavyweight Championship. He lost the title to Brian Logan. Logan defeated Larry Zbyszko and Ricky Landell in a three-way match on April 18, 2008, at a Mountaineer Wrestling Association event in Fayetteville, West Virginia.

On March 22, 2008, Larry was inducted into the XWF Hall of Fame by its creator Jack Blaze at their "XWF March Madness 2008" event. XWF was later renamed LPW (Legends Pro Wrestling) where Larry is still honored in their Hall of Fame- Class 2008.

Four Territories of the AWA Superstars of Wrestling have broken away from AWA Superstars of Wrestling, however, and joined with Championship Wrestling of Tennessee to create the American Wrestling Affiliates. Brian Logan took his championship reign and belt with him and Zbyszko is once again recognized as the AWA Superstars World Heavyweight Champion as AWA Superstars of Wrestling retroactively refused to recognize the title change. He dropped the title to Ricky Landell on October 11.

In 2009, Full Impact Pro hired Zbyszko as the executive director of the FIP Championship committee.

Zbyszko competed at the ROH show on January 29 as a part of Wrestle Reunion 4 where he defeated Scotty 2 Hotty.

In March 2010 Zbyszko started appearing at live events for the WFX in Winnipeg, Manitoba, Canada. Shortly after his debut, he was named the interim commissioner of the promotion, and makes regular appearances. He competed in one match for the promotion thus far, teaming with Jessie Godderz, to compete against Bushwacker Luke and Eugene Dinsmore.

Zbyszko defeated Palmer Canon for the All Out Mayhem Heavyweight Championship on November 20, 2010, in South Portland, Maine. In late March 2011, it was noted that Chris Jericho was very critical of Zbyszko and his announcing capabilities during his tenure in WCW in his latest book. When this was brought to his attention, Larry proceeded to challenge Jericho to say it to his face and questioned his manhood in a popular internet video. Zbyszko stated in another video that the reason for Jericho's disrespect was because he could not use the phrase "The Living Legend" in the WWE because it has been used and trademarked by Zbyszko. On March 17, 2012, In Caribou, Maine Zbyszko defeated Ryan Michaels in a lumberjack match to retain the All Out Mayhem Heavyweight Championship. He would lose the title a month later to Gino Martino in Gray, Maine.

His last match was on April 25, 2015, teaming with CPA which they lost to Beefcake Charlie and Damian Gibbs at Pro Wrestling Syndicate in Rahway, New Jersey.

== Personal life ==
Whistler married Kathleen Gagne (Daughter of AWA co-founder Verne Gagne and sister of wrestler Greg Gagne) in 1988. They have four sons: Timothy, Michael, John and Robert. Timothy is also a professional wrestler, and performs under the ring name Tim Zbyszko.

== Other media ==
Zbyszko's autobiography, Adventures In Larryland, was released on June 1, 2008.

Zbyszko has appeared as a playable character in WCW/nWo Revenge, WCW/nWo Thunder, WCW Nitro, WWE 2K16 (as DLC) and WWE 2K17 as a member of The Enforcers with Arn Anderson, and in WWE 2K18 without Anderson.

In 2025, he appeared on the movie The Unbreakable Bunch.

== Championships and accomplishments ==
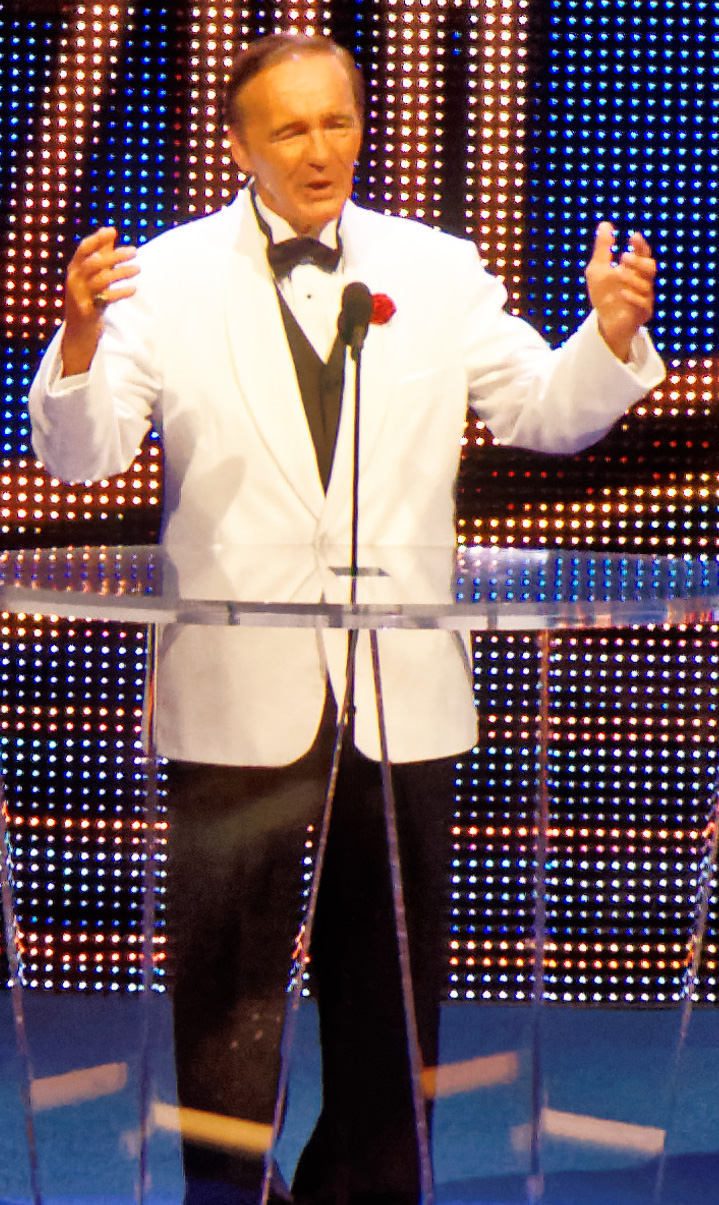
Zbyszko during his Hall of Fame induction in 2015

- All Out Mayhem Wrestling
  - AOM Heavyweight Championship (1 time)
- American Wrestling Association
  - AWA World Heavyweight Championship (2 times)
  - AWA America's Heavyweight Championship (1 time)
- AWA Superstars of Wrestling
  - AWA Superstars of Wrestling World Heavyweight Championship (1 time)
- Cauliflower Alley Club
  - Other honoree (1996)
- Georgia Championship Wrestling
  - NWA National Heavyweight Championship (2 times)
- Jim Crockett Promotions / World Championship Wrestling
  - NWA Western States Heritage Championship (1 time)
  - WCW World Television Championship (1 time)
  - WCW World Tag Team Championship (1 time) – with Arn Anderson
  - WCW World Tag Team Championship Tournament (1991) – with Arn Anderson
- Legends Pro Wrestling
  - XWF/LPW Hall of Fame (Class of 2008)
- NWA Hollywood Wrestling
  - NWA "Beat the Champ" Television Championship (1 time)
- New England Pro Wrestling Hall of Fame
  - Class of 2010
- Pro Wrestling Illustrated
  - PWI Match of the Year (1980) vs. Bruno Sammartino in a cage match at Showdown at Shea
  - PWI Most Hated Wrestler of the Year (1980)
  - PWI Rookie of the Year (1974)
  - PWI Tag Team of the Year (1991) with Arn Anderson
  - PWI ranked him #38 of the top 500 singles wrestlers in the PWI 500 in 1991
  - PWI ranked him #105 of the top 500 singles wrestlers of the "PWI Years" in 2003
- Southern Championship Wrestling
  - SCW Southern Tag Team Championship (1 time) – with Mister Saint Laurent
  - SCW Florida Tag Team Championship (2 times) – with Mister Saint Laurent
- USA Championship Wrestling
  - USA North American Heavyweight Championship (1 time)
- World Wide Wrestling Alliance
  - WWWA United States Championship (1 time)
- World Wide Wrestling Federation / WWE
  - WWWF Tag Team Championship (1 time) – with Tony Garea
  - WWE Hall of Fame (Class of 2015)
- Wrestling Observer Newsletter
  - Best Heel (1980)
  - Feud of the Year (1980) vs. Bruno Sammartino
  - Most Improved Wrestler (1980)
- Other titles
  - AWA World Six-Man Tag Team Championship (1 time) – with Chasyn Rance and Seth Springer
