= Jim Crockett Promotions =

Professional wrestling promotion

Jim Crockett Promotions Inc.
- Type: Private
- Industry: Professional wrestling
- Founded: 1931 (original company in Virginia); March 1965 (reincorporated in North Carolina)
- Founder: Jim Crockett
- Defunct: February 1965 (original company); April 1993 (reincorporated company)
- Fate: Selected assets sold to Turner Broadcasting System and relaunched as World Championship Wrestling in October 1988
- Headquarters: Charlotte, North Carolina, United States
- Area served: Eastern Seaboard
- Owner: Original company: Jim Crockett (1931–1965, 1965–1973); Jim Crockett Jr. (1973–1988, 1988–1993); WWE (2001–present)
- Parent: Original company: WWE Libraries (2001–present)

Jim Crockett Promotions, at times branded as Eastern States Championship Wrestling and Mid-Atlantic Championship Wrestling, was a family-owned professional wrestling promotion headquartered in Charlotte, North Carolina, United States. Founded in 1931, the promotion emerged as a cornerstone of the National Wrestling Alliance (NWA). By the 1980s, Jim Crockett Promotions was, along with the World Wrestling Federation (WWF, now WWE), one of the two largest promotions in the United States. The Crockett family sold a majority interest in the promotion to Turner Broadcasting System, resulting in the creation of World Championship Wrestling (WCW) in 1988.

== History ==
=== Early history (1931–1952) ===
Jim Crockett (1909–1973) was a promoter of live events including professional wrestling, music concerts, plays, minor league baseball, and ice hockey. In 1931, he founded his own professional wrestling promotion, Jim Crockett Promotions. Crockett built JCP as a regional promotion centred on the Carolinas and Virginia.

Although the business was always called Jim Crockett Promotions, it used a variety of pseudonyms as brand names for specific TV shows, newspaper and radio ads, and even on event tickets, themselves. Among those brand names that JCP created were "Championship Wrestling", "All Star Wrestling", "East Coast Wrestling", "Eastern States Championship Wrestling", "Mid-Atlantic Championship Wrestling", "Mid-Atlantic Championship Sports", "Wide World Wrestling", and "NWA Pro Wrestling", NWA World Wide Wrestling", and "NWA World Championship Wrestling" following its membership in the National Wrestling Alliance (NWA).

=== Early membership in the NWA (1952–1978) ===
==== 1950s to 1960s ====
Crockett joined the National Wrestling Alliance (NWA) in 1952, and his "territory" covered Virginia, North Carolina and South Carolina. The name "Mid-Atlantic Championship Wrestling" became JCP's primary brand name in print, radio, and other advertising (the name was also used for its main television programs). The business was incorporated in the 1950s.

==== 1970s ====
Jim Crockett died in 1973. He left JCP to his family, with his eldest son, Jim Crockett Jr., taking over as chief executive.

Led by the younger Crockett and under the guidance of a new creative force—former wrestler-turned-match-booker George Scott—the promotion moved away from generally primarily featuring tag teams, to primarily focusing on singles wrestling (although tag-team matches continued to play a big part in the company).

By the early-1970s, JCP had gradually phased-out its multiple weekly television tapings in such cities as Charlotte, North Carolina, Greenville, South Carolina, and High Point, North Carolina, consolidating its production schedule into just one shoot (a Wednesday night videotaping at WRAL-TV in Raleigh, North Carolina), and then syndicating the broadcast to several local TV stations throughout the Carolinas and Virginia. In 1981, JCP moved to the WPCQ-TV studios in Charlotte (a station once owned by Ted Turner).

The local shows hosted by announcers like Billy "Big Bill" Ward (from WBTV in Charlotte) and Charlie Harville (at WGHP in High Point) gave way to Mid-Atlantic Championship Wrestling (known briefly in 1978 as Mid-Atlantic Championship Sports). Mid-Atlantic was hosted by Bob Caudle, (a long-time WRAL weatherman). Caudle was joined by a rotation of co-hosts (everyone from Les Thatcher all the way to Dr. Tom Miller), before David Crockett (another son of Jim Crockett Sr.) became Bob's permanent co-host/color commentary man (after ending a very brief career as a wrestler, himself). For a brief period, a secondary show, East Coast Wrestling, was taped at WRAL; it was basically a re-packaged version of Mid-Atlantic, and it was also announced by Billy "Big Bill" Ward.

In 1975, JCP premiered a new, syndicated show, Wide World Wrestling (renamed World Wide Wrestling in 1978). The original host of this show was former Georgia Championship Wrestling announcer Ed Capral. Subsequent Wide World/World Wide announcers included Les Thatcher, George George, Sandy Scott, and Dr. Tom Miller. It was also hosted by the team of Rich Landrum and Johnny Weaver. In 1978, JCP later added a short-lived show, The Best of NWA Wrestling, which was taped at the WCCB studios in Charlotte (across the street from the now-Bojangles' Coliseum, a regular venue for Mid-Atlantic live events) and featured then-active wrestler Johnny Weaver sitting down with top stars in a "coach's show" format (in which host and guest did running commentary over 16 millimeter film footage of matches from local arenas). Rich Landrum and David Crockett appeared on "Best Of", doing promo interviews for local arena shows.

=== Regional expansion (1978–1983) ===
JCP gradually began to expand, running shows in eastern Tennessee, parts of West Virginia, and even Savannah, Georgia. In the late 1970s and early 1980s, it ran regular shows in Cincinnati and Dayton, Ohio. Crockett and Scott also bought minority shares of Frank Tunney's Toronto-based promotion, Maple Leaf Wrestling. Mid-Atlantic Championship Wrestling also aired on WUTV in Buffalo, New York, enabling the Tunney/Crockett/Scott enterprise to bring a full slate of shows to Ontario and upstate New York.

In the 1980s, Crockett, Jr. began consolidating the Southern member promotions of the National Wrestling Alliance. Discarding the Mid-Atlantic Championship Wrestling brand, he began promoting his events simply as NWA shows, although his promotion remained distinct from the larger NWA entity. In August 1980, Crockett, Jr. was elected president of the NWA, and the next year (the same year Crockett moved his TV show tapings from Raleigh to Charlotte), former (and future) Georgia Championship Wrestling (GCW) booker Ole Anderson took over as Mid-Atlantic's booker. In 1981, Anderson booked both JCP and GCW simultaneously.

In 1982, Crockett partnered with wrestlers Ric Flair and Blackjack Mulligan to start Southern Championship Wrestling, a secondary company out of Knoxville, Tennessee. The promotion featured such stars as Mulligan; his son Barry Windham (then billed as Blackjack Mulligan Jr.); Kevin Sullivan; Wayne Ferris; The Mongolian Stomper; Terry Taylor; Tim Horner, and others. The enterprise lasted less than one year, however.

=== National expansion (1983–1985) ===
By the 1980s, American professional wrestling was undergoing seismic and rapid change. The old, NWA-sanctioned system of separate, regional "territory" promotions was collapsing under increasing competitive pressure from Vincent K. McMahon's World Wrestling Federation (WWF, now WWE)—itself a family-owned territory promotion covering the northeastern U.S. — which was aggressively expanding into a nationwide promotion. Crockett had similar expansion goals, envisioning a united NWA through JCP's buyout of or merger with all of the NWA's regional promotions.

Ted Turner, whose Atlanta television station WTCG would become distributed nationally via satellite starting in 1976, had realized the value of professional wrestling for cable television in the early 1970s. WTCG aired Georgia Championship Wrestling's programming on Saturday evenings, and wrestling provided his then-fledgling enterprise (the future SuperStation WTBS) a source of cheap live entertainment which was well-suited to the station's target demographics. Turner could run per inquiry advertisements (for products like Slim Whitman albums and Ginsu knives) and take part of the sales profits just by providing the big viewing audience delivered by pro wrestling's loyal fanbase (wrestling generally did not attract large ad revenues at that time, due to negative industry perceptions of its lower-income target demographic).

SuperStation TBS's parent company, Turner Broadcasting System, had asked Georgia Championship Wrestling to change its public brand name to World Championship Wrestling, helping fuel rumors that the Jim Barnett-controlled company would go national itself; GCW acquiesced to the World Championship Wrestling name change in 1982. Meanwhile, by 1983, JCP went from recording its weekly shows in a television studio to shooting on-location, in between matches at live arena events. After purchasing a mobile television production unit for $1 million, Crockett unveiled what became the NWA's dominant annual supercard, Starrcade.

In 1984, McMahon's WWF purchased controlling interest in GCW from a number of its co-owners (including Barnett and brothers Jack and Jerry Brisco), thus gaining control of GCW's flagship Saturday night time slot on TBS. This tactic—co-opting the time slots of rival territories in their own "backyard"/local TV markets—was part of the WWF's national expansion strategy. To McMahon's surprise, however, the move backfired with TBS. When the WWF aired its first show on TBS on July 14, replacing World Championship Wrestling, viewer backlash was severe, as the show's Southern fans were incensed to see their beloved stars suddenly replaced—without advance notice—by an "invading force" of wrestlers from "up North", an event that has since become known in pro wrestling lore as Black Saturday. In response to the ensuing deluge of complaints, TBS granted an upstart promotion called Championship Wrestling from Georgia (backed by holdout GCW shareholder and NWA member Fred Ward and former GCW wrestler/booker Ole Anderson) an early Saturday morning time slot so that the local stars could still be seen. Championship Wrestling from Georgia's television show (which had the same name as the promotion itself), along with that of Bill Watts's Mid-South Wrestling (to whom Turner had also granted a time slot), easily surpassed the ratings for the WWF broadcast, which only featured clips and wrestler promos instead of original matches. The steep decline in ratings for the Saturday evening WWF show, and viewers clamoring for GCW's return, began to make the WWF's move a money-losing one. Eventually, McMahon cut his losses and sold the time slot to Crockett for $1 million. Although this gave Crockett vital national exposure, it also allowed McMahon to finance his own marquee wrestling event, WrestleMania. This chain of events was critical in Turner's eventual decision to purchase JCP and form World Championship Wrestling (WCW) in 1988.

An extra sense of urgency was added to Crockett's national expansion ambitions when, after Frank Tunney's death, his nephew and successor Jack joined forces with the WWF. Crockett would now have to either find other willing partner-promoters or buy them out if he wanted to run shows outside the Mid-Atlantic territory. This period also marked Crockett's first attempt to create a national promotion; Crockett and other wrestling companies needed this opportunity after the WWF buyout of the Toronto territory occurred, as well as after the airing of the WWF program The War to Settle the Score on MTV to high ratings. Together with the Minneapolis-based American Wrestling Association (AWA), Championship Wrestling from Georgia, and Memphis-based Jarrett Promotions, JCP created Pro Wrestling USA. However, the organization fell apart in January 1986.

=== Consolidation of the NWA (1985–1988) ===
Crockett bought out Ole Anderson's Championship Wrestling from Georgia, on April 6, 1985, and was re-elected NWA President. This was to help counter the WWF, after it became America's dominant wrestling business in the wake of WrestleMania. Crockett then purchased both Saturday evening TBS time slots from Vince McMahon and filled the time slot with two hours of original programming filmed in Ted Turner's Atlanta studios. The programming aired under the World Championship Wrestling banner, which had been adopted by GCW before its demise. The entire company was frequently referred to in the influential Pro Wrestling Illustrated and its sister publications by the WCW name or more commonly as "the World Championship area." As a result of the success World Championship Wrestling now had from JCP acquiring the Saturday night time slot, Crockett (along with JCP booker Dusty Rhodes) was able to establish an annual summer arena tour, "The Great American Bash" starting with a single supercard in 1985 and expanding to the full tour in 1986.

By 1987, Crockett was elected to a third term as NWA President, and gained control (either through purchase or working agreements) of the St. Louis Wrestling Club, Heart of America Sports Attractions (Bob Geigel's Central States brand), Championship Wrestling from Florida, and Bill Watts's Mid-South Sports (which operated under the Mid-South Wrestling, and later, upon expansion, Universal Wrestling Federation brand names). Despite Crockett now having six consolidated territories under his banner and leading the NWA, JCP and the NWA were still two separate entities, and Crockett—like all NWA promoters before and since—was simply licensing the NWA brand name, whose true value was as a credibility-infusing, fan-trusted brand name for wrestling championships. Still, Crockett had an iron-clad grip on the NWA World Heavyweight Championship during his presidency; by this point, JCP's top contracted performer, Ric Flair, was locked-in as the champion. Moreover, even though Flair was obligated to perform title-defense matches in each territory against the territory's own chosen star/challenger, any title changes only occurred between other performers also contracted to Crockett, such as Dusty Rhodes and Ron Garvin.

Crockett's rapid expansion had significant financial consequences for JCP. By December, the company had bought-out the rival UWF; Crockett even moved many of his administrative employees from his Charlotte base to the UWF's former offices in Dallas. Jim Crockett, Jr. and Dusty Rhodes personally manned the Dallas office, leaving Jim Jr.'s brother David Crockett in charge of the Charlotte operations. Bob Geigel, a former NWA President who bought his promotion back from Crockett in Febrtuary 1987 through a partnership, had also withdrawn from the NWA. JCP also began to run shows in new markets from coast-to-coast (often in less-than-sold-out arenas), greatly increasing travel costs and other overhead. JCP's first pay-per-view endeavor, 1987's Starrcade, was scheduled in its traditional Thanksgiving slot, but ran into unexpected competition from the WWF's inaugural Survivor Series PPV, which was scheduled to air the same night. Not wanting to possibly lose to the WWF in a direct PPV competition, Crockett decided to move Starrcade's starting time to Thanksgiving afternoon instead of the evening. However, the WWF then threatened cable companies that if they chose to air Starrcade, they would not be offered future WWF PPVs, including that year's Survivor Series and the forthcoming WrestleMania IV. Since the WWF was the uncontested #1 PPV content provider in America at the time, only a handful of companies committed to air Starrcade, devastating the event's profitability.

After the cable industry warned McMahon to never again attempt such a move, Crockett felt it safe to restart his PPV attempts, and scheduled Bunkhouse Stampede in January 1988. However, the WWF again sabotaged JCP by airing the first-ever Royal Rumble on the USA Network opposite Bunkhouse Stampede, cutting into its buy rate. Crockett then attempted to use McMahon's tactics against him, airing Clash of the Champions I—featuring a PPV-quality card—on TBS in an attempt to draw viewers away from WrestleMania IV on PPV, which took place that same night. This was one of the few tactics to actually work for JCP in its war with the WWF, as WrestleMania IV's buy rate was much lower than that of the previous year's Survivor Series. However, Clash of the Champions was now the only thing Crockett could use to keep the NWA alive, though it was not even as highly watched as the WWF's Saturday Night's Main Event. On the verge of bankruptcy, Crockett sold Jim Crockett Promotions to Ted Turner in November 1988, and the promotion was renamed the Universal Wrestling Corporation. Soon after, it was renamed again to World Championship Wrestling (WCW).

=== Sale to Turner Broadcasting System (1988–1993) ===
The eventual downfall of JCP, leading to its eventual sale to Ted Turner (and thereby the birth of WCW) can be attributed to several key factors. Magnum T. A. — one of JCP's top babyfaces, and the performer scheduled to become NWA World Heavyweight Champion at Starrcade 1986 — was severely injured in a car accident over two months before Starrcade (October 14), and could never wrestle again. So, JCP turned major "heel" Nikita Koloff, into a face on October 25, to take Magnum T. A.'s place while still being able to have a profitable build-up to Starrcade's main event. JCP alienated loyal fans in the Carolinas by moving Starrcade '87 and the Bunkhouse Stampede to arenas in Chicago and New York City, respectively. JCP had no real history and market presence in either of these non-southern metro areas, and its ability to drawing sellout crowds for arena shows in the Southeast eventually suffered, as some local fans vindictively withheld their support.

Booking decisions also factored into the promotion's downfall. JCP flushed away a potentially profitable angle following the acquisition of Bill Watts's UWF by "burying" the UWF's talent. Instead of portraying them as competitive with JCP wrestlers, the UWF's wrestlers and championships were portrayed as second-rate compared to those of JCP. Meanwhile, mid-carder Ron Garvin beat perennial champion Ric Flair for the NWA world title. Although Garvin was booked to be a babyface, many fans did not find him credible enough to be a serious threat to Flair.

JCP apparently neglected to monitor its own lavish spending as well. Crockett flew himself and his top performers around in an expensive private jet. In addition to the expense of Crockett's personal jet, there were other extravagant purchases such as the limousines provided for various wrestlers and regular business parties held by officials throughout JCP's regional offices. In addition, the large amount of capital needed to take a wrestling company on a national tour and Crockett's aggressive territorial acquisitions had seriously drained JCP's coffers. In purchasing the UWF, JCP also took responsibility for the UWF's large debt from TV contracts, etc.

Compounding the issues that came with expansion was a lack of investing in the kind of marketing needed to make it successful. As mentioned, major cards such as Starrcade and the Bunkhouse Stampede did not draw as well when moved out of JCP's traditional territory. According to Rhodes, JCP failed to gain the national name recognition that McMahon achieved with the World Wrestling Federation. Rhodes also pointed out that with the WWF's success, McMahon was financially able to lure the top talent away from rival companies. Because of this, JCP offered many of its stars lucrative contracts - paying them beyond their actual value - to prevent them from leaving the company.

Another factor was the fans' exasperation with the "Dusty Finish" (a type of "screwjob" finish named after Rhodes, who did not actually invent the concept, but used it frequently for matches at regular house shows and PPV/major cards, alike). Due to the heavy overuse of this end-of-match sequence, many JCP fans started to expect the swerve at any moment, whenever a popular wrestler (usually a face) appeared to win a title match and was about to be awarded the championship belt (or any similar situation), only to have the win overturned due to a technicality. As a result, attendance at live shows began to fall — even at venues where JCP had traditionally drawn well or extremely well.

By 1988, JCP was on the verge of bankruptcy. In November 1988, Turner Broadcasting System purchased a majority interest in JCP for $9 million. The Crockett family retained a minority interest, with Crockett, Jr. becoming a consultant. Turner Broadcasting System ultimately rebranded the promotion World Championship Wrestling. In 1993, JCP ceased to exist.

=== Ric Flair's Last Match ===
On May 16, 2022, Ric Flair announced he would return to the ring for the pay-per-view card Ric Flair's Last Match on July 31, 2022. Shortly after Flair's announcement, Conrad Thompson, organizer of the Starrcast wrestling fan convention (and Flair's son-in-law), who promoted the card, along with David Crockett filed for U.S. trademarks on "Jim Crockett Promotions" and "JCP" with respect to wrestling events, news, and merchandise, the trademark having been long abandoned. The event was presented under the JCP name. During a media call promoting the pay-per-view event, Thompson stated he would give his 50 percent of the Jim Crockett Promotions trademark to David Crockett on August 1, 2022, after the conclusion of the Starrcast weekend. As of 2026, there have been no further events promoted under the banner.

== Championships ==
World Championships	Retired	Notes	Revived
NWA World Heavyweight Championship	–	Currently active	
NWA World Women's Championship	–	Currently active	
NWA World Junior Heavyweight Championship	1989	Revived from 1995–2017	Lightning One, Inc. reintroduced the championship in 2022
NWA World Television Championship (Mid-Atlantic version)	1991	Became the WCW World Television Championship	Lightning One, Inc. introduced its own version in 2020
NWA World Tag Team Championship (Mid-Atlantic version)	1991	Became the WCW World Tag Team Championship	National Wrestling Alliance, Inc. introduced its own version in 1992 and again in 1995
NWA World Six-Man Tag Team Championship	1989	Replaced with the WCW World Six-Man Tag Team Championship	NWA New Jersey reintroduced the championship in 1998
United States Championships	Retired	Notes	Revived
NWA United States Heavyweight Championship (Mid-Atlantic version)	1991	Became the WCW United States Heavyweight Championship	World Wrestling Entertainment reintroduced the championship in 2003
NWA United States Tag Team Championship (Mid-Atlantic version)	1991	Became the WCW United States Tag Team Championship	Lightning One, Inc. introduced its own version in 2022
NWA United States Women's Championship	1988	Retired	Defunct
National Championships	Retired	Notes	Revived
NWA National Heavyweight Championship	1987	Unified with the NWA United States Heavyweight Championship (Mid-Atlantic version)	Pro Wrestling Organization LLC reintroduced the championship in 1997
NWA National Television Championship	1986	Retired in favor of the NWA World Television Championship (Mid-Atlantic version)	Defunct
NWA National Tag Team Championship	1985	Replaced with the NWA United States Tag Team Championship (Mid-Atlantic version)	Defunct
Regional Championships	Retired	Notes	Revived
NWA Brass Knuckles Championship (Mid-Atlantic version)	1986	Retired	Defunct
NWA Mid-Atlantic Heavyweight Championship	1986	Retired when JCP expanded out of the Mid-Atlantic	Defunct
NWA Mid-Atlantic Television Championship	1984	Became the NWA World Television Championship (Mid-Atlantic version)	Defunct
NWA Mid-Atlantic Tag Team Championship	1984	Retired when JCP expanded out of the Mid-Atlantic	Revived version promoted by the modern Mid-Atlantic Championship Wrestling from 1999–2017
NWA Western States Heritage Championship	1989	Retired when final champion Larry Zbyszko returned to the American Wrestling Association	Defunct

== See also ==
- David Crockett
- Jim Crockett
- Jim Crockett Jr.
- List of former Jim Crockett Promotions personnel
- World Championship Wrestling
