= Battle royal (professional wrestling) =

Multi-competitor match type

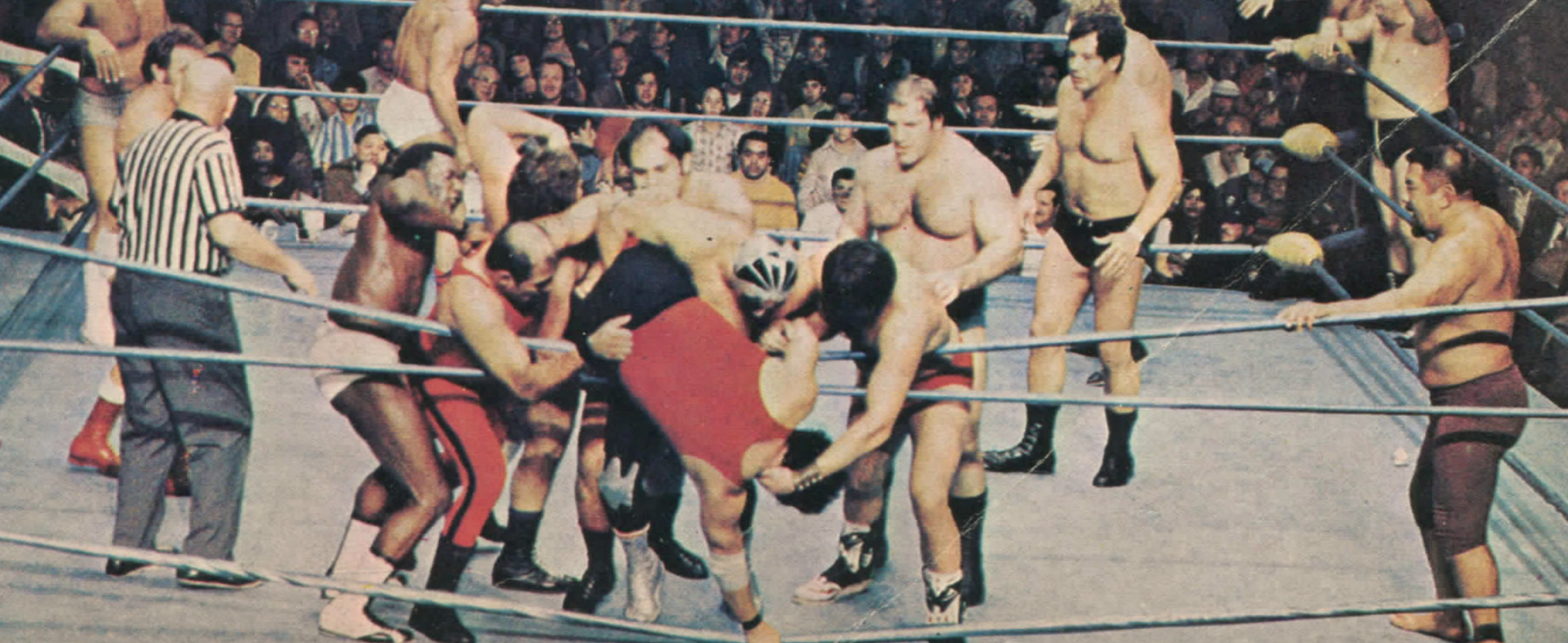
1972 22-Man Invitational Battle Royal

In professional wrestling, a battle royal (sometimes battle royale), is a multi-competitor match type in which wrestlers are eliminated until one is left and declared the winner. Typical battle royals begin with a number of participants in the ring, who are then eliminated by going over the top rope and having both feet touch the venue floor.

== Variations ==
=== Battlebowl ===
In a two-ring variation on a battle royal, the wrestlers start in one ring and try to throw wrestlers into the second ring, after which they can be eliminated by being thrown out of that ring. The last remaining wrestler in the first ring can rest until only one wrestler is left in the second ring, after which they fight in both rings until one is eliminated and a winner is declared, in similar fashion to a double elimination tournament. The two-ring version was held in World Championship Wrestling's 1991 Starrcade event. Subsequent Battlebowl matches occurred under normal battle royal rules.

=== Battle Zone ===
This format uses any number of wrestlers in a standard one-ring, over-the-top-rope elimination, but includes tables covered with barbed wire, thumbtacks, and light bulbs around the ring's perimeter, onto which losing wrestlers may be thrown.

=== Bunkhouse Stampede ===
The National Wrestling Alliance's (NWA) Bunkhouse Stampede involved wrestlers wearing what was described as "bunkhouse gear"—cowboy boots, jeans, T-shirts—instead of their normal wrestling tights, and not only allowed but encouraged the bringing of weapons. In 1988 the NWA named a pay-per-view after the Bunkhouse Stampede, headlined by a Bunkhouse Stampede match in a cage.

=== Dynamite Dozen Battle Royale ===
The original AEW Dynamite Diamond Ring (2019–2020).

The Dynamite Dozen Battle Royale is utilized by All Elite Wrestling (AEW) and is held once a year as part of their weekly television program, Dynamite, with the ultimate prize being the AEW Dynamite Diamond Ring. The inaugural match took place in November 2019, and then from 2020 to 2022, it was held in December to coincide with the annual Winter Is Coming television special of Dynamite, but moved up to October in 2023, then returned to coincide with Winter Is Coming in 2024. The original rules featured 12 wrestlers competing in a standard battle royal, but ended when there were two wrestlers remaining, with the co-winners then facing each other in a singles match on the following week's episode for the AEW Dynamite Diamond Ring. The winner of the championship ring holds it until the following year's battle royal. In 2022 and 2023, there was only one winner of the 12-man battle royal, who then went on to face the reigning ring holder from the prior year. In 2024, it returned to having two winners with the co-winners then facing each other for the right to challenge the reigning ring holder from the prior year. MJF is the only wrestler to have won the ring, winning it every year since its inception—since 2022, he has received a bye in the battle royal.

=== Fulfill Your Fantasy battle royal ===
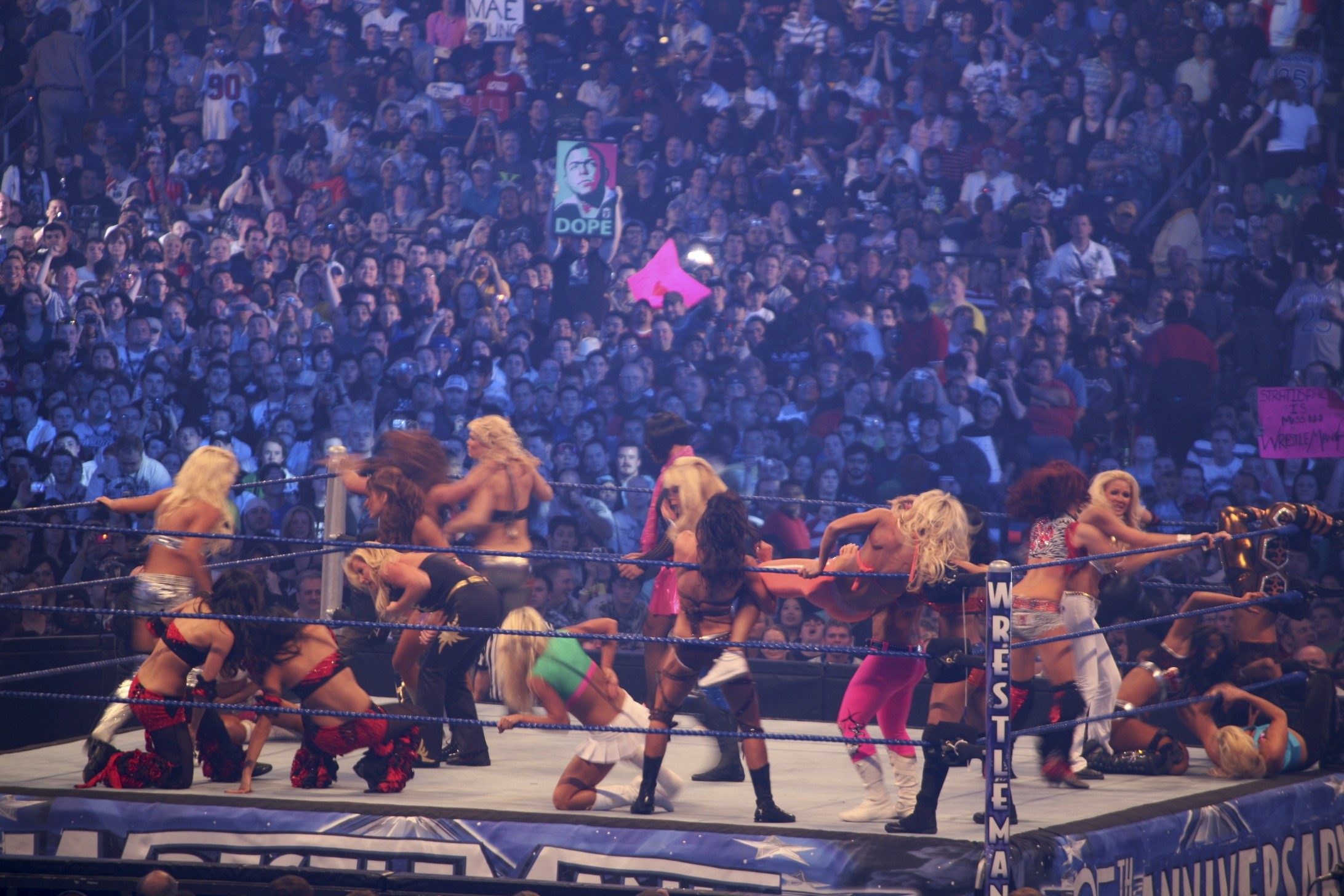
A 25-Diva battle royal held at WrestleMania XXV. Male wrestler Santino Marella won the match dressed as his fictional twin sister, Santina.

A WWE women's battle royal with the addition of fetish outfits, such as french maid, lingerie, nurse and schoolgirl. Often the type of outfit is chosen by an audience poll.

=== Hardcore battle royal ===
A battle royal with hardcore rules (no disqualifications and no count-outs) involving several competitors in the ring at the same time. The match could last for either 15 or 20 minutes. Participants are not eliminated by being thrown out of the ring and both feet touching the floor. Pinning or forcing to submit the current Hardcore champion made that participant the interim champion. Whoever held the title at end of the time limit was declared the winner and official champion.

=== Last Blood battle royal ===
A Last Blood battle royal is essentially a multi-competitor First Blood match. The winner is the last wrestler in the match not bleeding.

=== Reverse battle royal ===
Generally used in Total Nonstop Action Wrestling, a reverse battle royal begins with wrestlers surrounding the ring instead of inside it. At the start of the match they battle for half of them to get into the ring, at which point a standard last person standing wins the battle royal.

=== TNA Knockout Makeover Battle Royal ===
The match begins as a multi-woman over-the-top elimination battle royal. Participants are eliminated as they are thrown over the top rope and both feet land on the floor. When two competitors remain, they face each other in a ladder match, where the winner receives a TNA Knockout Championship match and the loser has her head shaved.

=== Women's battle royal ===
A women's battle royal may allow women to be eliminated by being thrown through or under the ropes as well as over the top rope, although WWE's first official women's Royal Rumble match in 2018 used the same rules as the men's version.

=== World War 3 ===
Created by World Championship Wrestling in 1995, the World War 3 battle royal had three rings and 60 competitors. 20 wrestlers started in each ring, where they wrestled under regular battle royal rules. When 30 competitors remained (except in 1997, where the number was 15 and 1998, when 20 men were left), all competitors entered the center ring and continued under regular rules until only one was left standing.

== Rumble rules battle royals ==
In this version - unlike traditional battles royal, where all wrestlers begin the match in the ring - only the first two competitors begin the match. The rest enter at timed intervals, according to numbers they draw, until the entire field has entered.

Former wrestler and longtime WWE official Pat Patterson is credited with inventing this variation.

=== Royal Rumble ===
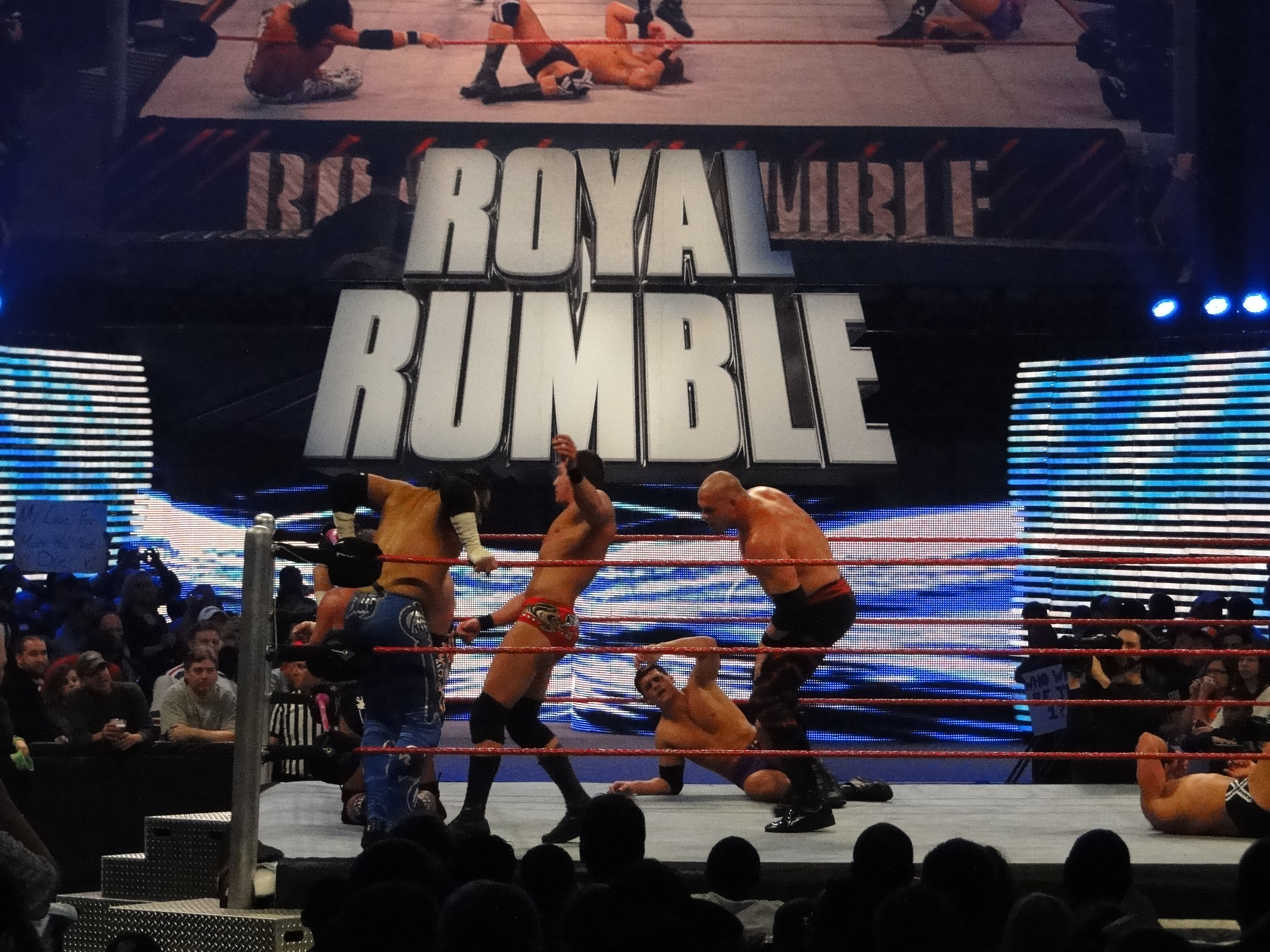
2010 Royal Rumble match

WWE's Royal Rumble is the original battle royal to use this format. It begins with two wrestlers in the ring, with the remaining participants introduced one by one at a set time period, usually 90 seconds or two minutes. Elimination occurs in the normal way with the last person standing as the winner, after all participants (traditionally 30) have entered the ring. There is both a men's and women's Royal Rumble match, with the winners getting a world championship match (in their respective divisions) at that year's WrestleMania, which is WWE's biggest annual show. Deviations from the traditional 30 wrestler field include the original 20-man Royal Rumble in 1988, the 40-man 2011 Royal Rumble and the 50-man Greatest Royal Rumble in 2018.

=== Extreme Warfare / King of the Hill ===
Extreme Championship Wrestling promoted two "Rumble" style battle royals. The first was the "Extreme Warfare" match, which was held on December 12, 1994 and aired on the December 27 broadcast of ECW Hardcore TV. Extreme Warfare was won by Ron Simmons, who last eliminated Chris Benoit and Dean Malenko. The second was the "King of the Hill," which also featured pinfall and submission eliminations. The match took place on December 20, 1996, and was aired on the December 24 edition of Hardcore TV. The match was won by Sabu, who last eliminated Brian Lee to named the "King of the Hill".

=== Honor Rumble ===
Ring of Honor (ROH) also periodically features the "Rumble" style of battle royal on their shows, billing it as the Honor Rumble.

=== New Japan Rumble ===
New Japan Pro-Wrestling's annual "Rumble" battle royal takes place on the pre-show of the Wrestle Kingdom show on January 4. (Note: During the era in which Wrestle Kingdom was a two- or three-night show, the Rumble took place on the pre-show of the first night.) Participants enter at one-minute intervals and are eliminated via pinfall, submission, or by being thrown over the top rope. Typically leaning towards light comedy, the match includes past stars as surprise entrants. It is also known as the "New Japan Ranbo", the Japanese word ranbo meaning "to run riot".

=== Stardom Rumbles ===
Similar to NJPW Rambo match, its sister promotion World Wonder Ring Stardom also uses the same concept, as well as traditional Royal Rumble matches. On March 3, 2021, Unagi Sayaka won the inaugural "All-Star Rumble" at Stardom All Star Dream Cinderella. The first "Stardom Rambo" match took part on November 20, 2022, during Historic X-Over, which was won by Mirai.

=== Royal Sambo ===
A variation in Dragongate exclusive to Sambo Hall shows in the promotion's home city of Kobe, Japan. The match begins with two participants. Every 60 seconds after, two more wrestlers enter the ring simultaneously, with a range of 10-20 total participants. Eliminations occur via pinfall, submission, or being thrown over the top rope to the floor. Multiple wrestlers may pin or submit a single wrestler simultaneously. The match is typically more comedic in tone, is contested by members of the roster lower on the card, and is rarely for any defined prize. However, occasionally the match has higher stakes and participants higher on the card vying for #1 contender stipulations, or with multiple winners advancing to an important match at another show.

=== Call Your Shot Gauntlet ===
The Call Your Shot Gauntlet (originally called Gauntlet for the Gold) is the "Rumble" style battle royal used by TNA Wrestling. In this version two wrestlers begin in the ring, with additional wrestlers entering on a set time period. Wrestlers are eliminated by being thrown over the top rope and to the floor until two wrestlers are left, at which point a standard singles match begins. The prize for winning this match (which in recent years has become intergender and held at Impact's biggest annual show Bound For Glory) is getting a championship match at the time, the place, and for the title of the winner's choosing.

=== Square Go! ===
Square Go! is Insane Championship Wrestling's (ICW) own hybrid of WWE's Royal Rumble and Money in the Bank matches, and is named for the Glaswegian term for a street fight. It features 30 competitors that compete in an over-the-top-rope battle royal, with the winner earning the Square Go! Briefcase. It has mostly the same rules as WWE's Royal Rumble, where two competitors draw the numbers 1 and 2 and the remaining participants enter the match one-by-one every 2 minutes. There are also five random numbers that allow those entrants to carry a weapon of their choice into the ring. As with battle royals, participants are eliminated when thrown over the top rope with both feet landing on the floor. The winner receives a briefcase that entitles them to a match for the ICW World Heavyweight Championship at any time and place of their choosing for up to one year, after which it becomes invalid (like WWE's Money in the Bank briefcase).

=== Battle Riot ===
Major League Wrestling's "Rumble" style battle royal. Participants enter at one minute intervals and are eliminated via pinfall, submission or by being thrown over the top rope.

=== Aztec Warfare ===
Aztec Warfare is the Lucha Underground version of the "Rumble Rules" battle royal. Upwards to 20 participants enter every 90 seconds and elimination occurs by either pinfall or submission and has to take place inside the ring. There are no count-outs and no disqualifications. As of April 2019, four Aztec Warfare matches have occurred—one in each season of Lucha Underground.

=== Casino Battle Royale ===
The Casino Battle Royale is utilized by All Elite Wrestling (AEW). It is a modified rumble rules battle royal that features 21 entrants. It begins with a group of five wrestlers, and every three minutes, another group of five wrestlers enters, while the 21st and final entrant enters alone. The wrestlers are grouped based on the suit they drew from a deck of cards—spades, diamonds, clubs, or hearts—and the order of when each group enters is based on a random draw of the cards. The 21st and final entrant is the wrestler who drew the joker. The winner receives a world championship match of their respective gender's division—either the AEW World Championship or the AEW Women's World Championship. The first Casino Battle Royale, which was a men's match, was held at Double or Nothing in May 2019.

A men's tag team variation of the match, called the Casino Tag Team Royale, was first utilized at Revolution in March 2021. Instead of being contested between 21 individual singles wrestlers, the match features 10-15 tag teams (for a total of 20-30 wrestlers). The rules in terms of entrants also differs. The order of entrants is based on a lottery. Two tag teams start the match, and every 90 seconds, a new team enters. Individual eliminations occur when a wrestler has gone over the top rope and both feet hit the floor; a team is eliminated when both members of the team have been ruled out of the match. The match ends when one wrestler or team is left. The winning tag team earns an AEW World Tag Team Championship match.

A variation for three-man teams (referred to as trios by AEW) has also been established, called the Casino Trios Royale. Debuting in December 2022 on Rampage, this version features eight trios teams (24 total wrestlers). Three teams start, and a new team enters every 90 seconds. When all three members of a team are eliminated, then the team is ruled out of the match. The winner (or winners if more than one team member is remaining) receives $300,000 to be split amongst the team.

=== Royal Rampage ===
Established in 2022 by All Elite Wrestling (AEW) on their Rampage program, Royal Rampage takes place on the same night as their Dynamite: Blood and Guts event because of the two ring setup used for the eponymous match. A modified Rumble rules battle royal, Royal Rampage involves two rings and 20 competitors. It starts with two wrestlers in each ring, with a new wrestler entering every 60 seconds to their assigned ring, until all 20 wrestlers have entered (10 in each ring). The two final wrestlers from each ring then consolidate into a single ring, where the last wrestler remaining wins the match, with the prize being a future championship match.

=== Copa Bardahl ===
The Copa Bardahl (Spanish for Bardahl Cup) is a professional wrestling match based on a traditional battle royal, sponsored by the automotive brand Bardahl. The match is usually held annually at Lucha Libre AAA Worldwide's TripleMania events. The rules are similar to both WWE's Royal Rumble match and Major League Wrestling's Battle Riot where 12 to 17 wrestlers compete; two competitors start the match with another competitor entering every 90 seconds. In addition to eliminating opponents by throwing them over the top rope with both of their feet touching the floor like a traditional battle royal, eliminations can also occur via pinfall or submission.

== Team variations ==
Team variations of battle royals consist of designated tag teams of wrestlers, usually two to a team. There are different types of such matches, and though most follow normal battle royal rules, teams may be eliminated when either one or both partners are eliminated from the ring. One notable version was the battle royal prior to WrestleMania XV, where each wrestler fought as a singles competitor, with the final two in the ring named joint winners, earning the right to challenge for the promotion's tag team championship later that night.
