= Bunkhouse Stampede =

Professional wrestling tournament

The Bunkhouse Stampede was a professional wrestling tournament/show held annually by Jim Crockett Promotions from 1985 through 1988.

== History ==
=== Concept ===
In 1985, the NWA's Jim Crockett Promotions came up with a new match to increase the fans' interest in their product. The Bunkhouse Stampede was a regular battle royal where the wrestlers wore "bunkhouse gear" (blue jeans and cowboy boots, etc.) to the match, similar to 'street fight' matches. Weapons were also allowed. For example, Ivan and Nikita Koloff brought their chains to the ring, and The Road Warriors brought their spikes, others used trash can lids and leather straps. To win this match, a wrestler had to be the last one in the ring, with all of the other wrestlers having been thrown over the top rope. These were most often bloody matches, as there were several weapons involved.

Each year, there were several Bunkhouse Stampedes held in the prior weeks, with the winners of each one going to the final Bunkhouse Stampede to battle for the championship. They began in 1985, and the last was held in 1989, after which it was abandoned. The winner was awarded a large bronze cowboy boot.

==== 1987 format ====
The format was slightly different in 1987; rather than have all of the champions meet in a final match, it was decided that whoever won the most matches during the tour would be declared the champion. When Dusty Rhodes and Big Bubba Rogers ended up tied after the final match in San Francisco (itself marred by the fact that the last two wrestlers in the ring were The Road Warriors, but they tossed a coin and the loser jumped out of the ring), a two-man steel cage bunkhouse match (where one wrestler had to throw the other out of the cage) between the two determined the overall winner, over Jim Cornette's protests that Rogers should have been declared the winner because, while Rhodes had won as many of the matches, Rogers had won more money (because while most of the matches had $25,000 prizes, Rogers won a $100,000 match in Atlanta).

=== Broadcasts ===
Only one of the earlier Bunkhouse Stampedes, on December 28, 1985, was broadcast on NWA Television, but it was cut off after only a few minutes of action. The 1988 Championship was held on pay-per-view on January 24, 1988 in Uniondale, New York at the Nassau Coliseum.

Petitions from wrestling fans to bring the event back and rename it as The Dusty Rhodes Memorial Bunkhouse Stampede.

== Bunkhouse Stampede winners ==
- 1985: Dusty Rhodes
- 1986: Dusty Rhodes
- 1987: Dusty Rhodes
- 1988: Dusty Rhodes

== See also ==
- National Wrestling Alliance
- Jim Crockett Promotions
