= American Digger =

American Digger may refer to:

- American Digger (magazine), a bimonthly magazine about the hobby of recovering historical artifacts
- American Digger (TV series), an American reality television series
