= Fred Ward Memorial Show =

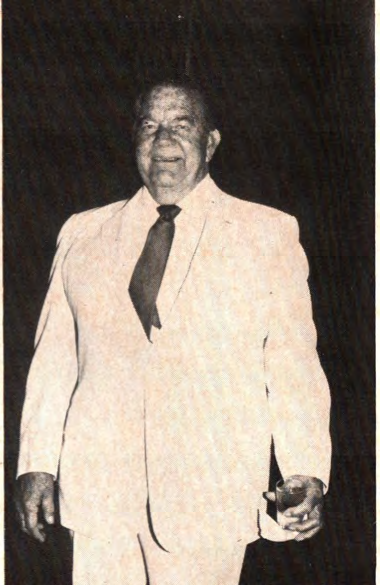
- Fred Ward
- Promotion: Georgia Championship Wrestling
- Date: 2004-2009
- City: Columbus, Georgia (2004-2006); Phenix City, Alabama (2007-2009)
- Venue: GCW Arena (2004-2006); GR8 SK8 Plex (2007-2009)

The Fred Ward Memorial Show was an annual professional wrestling memorial event produced by the Georgia Championship Wrestling (GCW) promotion, which was held from 2004 to 2009. The show was held in honor of Fred Ward, a pioneering wrestling promoter who controlled the central Georgia wrestling territory for over 30 years, who died on May 7, 1992. It was originally held in Columbus, Georgia by GCW until Jerry Oates' retirement in 2006, whereupon the new owners Bill and Diane Hewes relocated the promotion, renamed Great Championship Wrestling, to Phenix City, Alabama. Its third annual memorial show, the last show held at the GCW Arena, "drew the biggest crowd [at the venue] in over a year".

Many of the featured wrestlers were former stars in World Championship Wrestling or were then competing in Total Nonstop Action Wrestling as well as local stars such as Jason Cross, Damian Steele, Vordell Walker, and David Young. Older regional stars from the Georgia territory, many of whom had worked for Fred Ward, also made guest appearances. The first Ward tribute show in 2004 saw masked wrestler The Wrestler defeat GCW United States Junior Heavyweight Champion Vordell Walker and an 8-man single-elimination tournament in which the winner, Jason Cross, received an award from Mr. Wrestling II. Ole Anderson, Bill Dromo, Thunderbolt Patterson, Les Thatcher, Masked Superstar, The Oates Brothers (Jerry and Ted Oates), and Brad and "Bullet" Bob Armstrong were seen in later shows.

== Show results ==
=== First Annual Fred Ward Tribute Show (2004) ===
August 10, 2004 in Columbus, Georgia (GCW Arena)

#	Results	Stipulations	Times
1	Elix Skipper and Sonny Siaki wrestled to a time-limit draw.	First Round Tournament match	na
2	Johnny Swinger defeated John Bogey	First Round Tournament match	na
3	Jason Cross defeated Damian Steele	First Round Tournament match	n/a
4	A.J. Steele defeated Erik Watts	First Round Tournament match	n/a
5	Jason Cross defeated A.J. Steele	Semi-Final Tournament match	n/a
6	The Wrestler defeated Vordell Walker (c)	Singles match for the GCW United States Junior Heavyweight Championship	n/a
7	Jason Cross defeated Johnny Swinger	Finals Tournament match	6:38
(c) - refers to the champion prior to the match

==== Tournament brackets ====
This was a one-night tournament which took place on August 10, 2004. The tournament brackets were:

Quarterfinals
Elix Skipper	Draw
Sonny Siaki
Johnny Swinger
John Bogey
Jason Cross
Damien Steele
A.J. Steele
Erik Watts

Semifinals
Johnny Swinger
BYE
Jason Cross
A.J. Steele

Finals
Johnny Swinger
Jason Cross

=== Second Annual Fred Ward Memorial Show (2005) ===
August 6, 2005 in Columbus, Georgia (GCW Arena)

#	Results	Stipulations	Times
1	A.J. Steele defeated Greg Brown	Singles match	n/a
2	Brad Armstrong and Bob Armstrong defeated Lee Thomas and John Bogie	Tag Team match	n/a
3	Masked Superstar and The Wrestler defeated The Oates Brothers (Jerry and Ted Oates)	Tag Team match	n/a
3	Elix Skipper defeated Damian Steele	Singles match	n/a
4	Disco Inferno (c) defeated Jason Cross	Singles match for the GCW Television Championship	n/a
5	David Young and Chris Stevens defeated Erik Watts and Sonny Siaki	Tag Team match	n/a
(c) - refers to the champion prior to the match

=== Third Annual Fred Ward Memorial Show (2006) ===
September 23, 2006 in Columbus, Georgia (GCW Arena)

#	Results	Stipulations	Times
1	John Bogie defeated DeathRow	Steel Cage barbed wire baseball bat match	16:11
2	Suicide defeated Nooie Li	Singles match	7:05
3	Amy Young defeated 4 other participants by last eliminating Gina Marie. (Note: The other participants included were: Trenesha, Sapphire, and Devin Diamo.)	Five-woman battle royal for the GCW Women’s Championship; As per the pre-match stipulation, Young became the first champion.	10:07
4	Michaels Inc. (Scott Fantastic, Shaun Banks and Quentin Michaels) defeated Team Beach (Scotty Beach, Heath Miller and John Rodriguez)	Six-Man Elimination match	14:50
5	Bobby Sanford (c) defeated Legion "Freakin" Cage (with Gina Marie)	Ladder match for the GCW Columbus Heavyweight Championship	16:28
6	Chris Stevens (c) defeated Elix Skipper and Johnny Swinger	No-DQ Three-Way Dance match for the GCW Heavyweight Championship	15:11
(c) - refers to the champion prior to the match

=== Fourth Annual Fred Ward Memorial Show (2007) ===
September 29, 2007 in Phenix City, Alabama (GR8 SK8 Plex)

#	Results	Stipulations	Times
1	John Bogie defeated Chuck The Ring Inspector by TKO	Bouncing Boxing match	n/a
2	Frankie Valentine defeated Randall Johnson	Hair vs. Hair match	n/a
3	David Young and Chris Stevens wrestled Sonny Siaki and Damien Steele to a time limit draw	Best 2/3 Falls Tag Team match for the vacant GCW Tag Team Championship; Prior to the match, GCW Commissioner Bo Oates had stripped The Naturals of the titles for failing to appear at the event.	n/a
4	A.J. Steele defeated DeathRow	Electric Chair match	n/a
5	Cru Jones and Scrappy McGowan defeated John Bogie and Bo Oates	Retirement match; As per the pre-match stipulations, Oates surrendered his position as GCW Commissioner to McGowan and forced to retire.	n/a
6	Scotty Beach defeated Shaun Banks (with Quentin Michaels)	Weasel Suit vs. Dress Match; As per the pre-match stipulations, Quentin Michaels had to put on a weasel suit.	n/a
7	Bull Buchanan defeated Johnny Swinger (c) (with Quentin Michaels)	Six-Sides-of-Steel match for the GCW Heavyweight Championship	n/a
(c) - refers to the champion prior to the match

=== Fifth Annual Fred Ward Memorial Show (2008) ===
September 4, 2008 in Phenix City, Alabama (GR8 SK8 Plex)

#	Results	Stipulations	Times
1	John Bogie and Kareem Abdul Jamar defeated Merchants of Death (Orion Bishop & Murder One) (with Wicked Nemesis) (c)	Hardcore match for the GCW Tag Team Championship	13:12
2	Scotty Beach defeated Mike Stratus (with Princeton Gainey III)	Singles match; As per the pre-match stipulation, Beach received five minutes in the ring with Gainey.	10:17
3	Princeton Gainey III defeated Scotty Beach	Singles match	:47
4	Sonny Siaki defeated Tilo	Singles match	:29
5	J-Rod defeated Shaun Banks	First Blood match for the GCW Interstate Championship	11:56
5	Cru Jones (c) defeated Bull Buchanan	Bullrope match for the GCW Heavyweight Championship	18:50
6	Micah Taylor and Diane Hewes defeated Johnny Swinger and Quentin Michaels	All or Nothing match; As per the pre-match stipulations, Diane Hewes won 100% ownership of GCW.	16:00
(c) - refers to the champion prior to the match

=== Sixth Annual Fred Ward Memorial Show (2009) ===
September 17, 2009 in Phenix City, Alabama (GR8 SK8 Plex)

#	Results	Stipulations	Times
1	Dany Only and Ron Stalker defeated Kyle Matthews and Bobby Moore (c) and J-Rod and Frankie Valentine	3-Way Steel Cage Tag Team match for the GCW Tag Team Championship	n/a
2	Tex Monroe (c) defeated Mike Kross and Rubén	3-Way Dance for the GCW Interstate Heavyweight Championship	n/a
3	Michael Stevens and Leon McMichael defeated Cru Jones and Chris Stevens	Tag Team match	n/a
4	Johnny Swinger defeated Shaun Banks	I Quit match	n/a
5	Jimmy Rave (c) defeated Murder One	Singles match for the GCW Heavyweight Championship	n/a
(c) - refers to the champion prior to the match
