= UCW-Zero Ultra-X Championship =

Professional wrestling championship

Details
- Promotion: Ultra Championship Wrestling-Zero
- Date established: 2004
- Current champion: Odwun
- Date won: January 11, 2020
Statistics
- First champion: Tristan Gallo
- Most reigns: Khan Kussion (3 reigns)

The UCW-Zero Ultra-X Championship is the secondary singles title in Ultra Championship Wrestling-Zero. It was first won by Tristan Gallo in 2004 and has been defended throughout the state of Utah, most often in Salt Lake City, but also in the Rocky Mountains and the Southwest United States. The title was formerly recognized by AWA Superstars from 2005 to 2007, and then by the National Wrestling Alliance when the promotion became an NWA territory that same year.

== Title history ==
Wrestler:	Times:	Date:	Location:	Notes:
Tristan Gallo	1	2004		
Los Mochi Paco	1	August 2004		
Title history unrecorded'
Alex Brady	1	June 2005		
Title history unrecorded'
Adrian Blade	1	September 2005		
Khan Kussion	1	November 12, 2005		
G.Q. Gallo	1	June 20, 2006	Tempe, Arizona	
Khan Kussion	2	June 24, 2006	Salt Lake City, Utah	Defeated Gallo in a 3-Way Dance with David Young.
Stevie Slick	1	September 2006	Salt Lake City, Utah	Slick was the UCW-Zero CEO.
Khan Kussion	3	December 2, 2006	Salt Lake City, Utah	
Title vacated after Khan Kussion surrendered the championship at a UCW-Zero event in Salt Lake City, Utah on January 20, 2007.'
Kid Cade	1	January 20, 2007	Salt Lake City, Utah	Defeated Devan Payne in a tournament final.
Jeff Orcut	1	April 14, 2007	Salt Lake City, Utah	
Alex Brady	2	August 3, 2007	Salt Lake City, Utah	Won title in an elimination match against Orcut, Kid Cade, Chip, and Junior X.
Cassidy	1	September 7, 2007	Salt Lake City, Utah	
Jeff Orcut	2	December 7, 2007	Salt Lake City, Utah	
Stevie Slick	2	May 17, 2008	West Jordan, Utah	
Jr-X	1	August 16, 2008	West Jordan, Utah	Won title in a gauntlet match against Steve Slick, Kid Kade, Chip and Jeff Orcut.
Dallas Murdock	1	July 18, 2009	Murray, Utah	
Antonio Mestre	1	August 22, 2009	Murray, Utah	
Dallas Murdock	2	November 21, 2009	Murray, Utah	
Antonio Mestre	2	March 20, 2010	Murray, Utah	
Title deactivated
Zack James	1	December 8, 2012	Salt Lake City, Utah	Won reactivated title in a battle royal.
Suede Thompson	1	June 15, 2013	Salt Lake City, Utah	
Lacey Ryan	1	October 19, 2013	Salt Lake City, Utah	
Durango Kid	1	January 11, 2014	Salt Lake City, Utah	Defeated Ryan and Kid Kade in a triple threat match.
Lacey Ryan	2	May 10, 2014	Salt Lake City, Utah	Defeated Durango Kid.
Manny Fresh	1	August 4, 2014	Salt Lake City, Utah	Defeated Lacey Ryan.
Rocky Ocean (The Seas Snake)	1	September 22, 2014	Salt Lake City, Utah	Defeated Manny Fresh.
Manny Fresh	2	October 11, 2014	Salt Lake City, Utah	Defeated Rocky Ocean (The Seas Snake) on a Loser Leave UCW Zero Match.
Jason Jaxon	1	March 14, 2015	Salt Lake City, Utah	Defeated Manny Fresh.
Durango Kid	2	June 13, 2015	Salt Lake City, Utah	Defeated Jason Jaxon.
Kade	2	October 3, 2015	Salt Lake City, Utah	Defeated Durango Kid.
Braydon Austin	1	March 3, 2016	Salt Lake City, Utah	Defeated Kade and Andrew SoWell in 3-way match.
Andrew Sowell	1	June 25, 2016	Salt Lake City, Utah	Defeated Braydon Austin.
Title history unknown
Guerrero Azteca	1	March 9, 2019	Salt Lake City, Utah	Defeated Christian Connors.
Title vacated by Guerrero Azteca on July 3, 2019 to contend for UCW Heavyweight Championship
Paradise	1	August 10, 2019	Salt Lake City, Utah	Defeated Adan Reyes & Kade in a Triple Threat Match for the vacant title.
Blake Grayson	1	November 2, 2019	Salt Lake City, Utah	Defeated Paradise.
Vacated by Blake Grayson on January 11, 2020 after suffering an injury outside UCW-Zero. Stevie Slick ordered for an immediate Triple Threat title match for the vacated title
Odwun	1	January 11, 2020	Salt Lake City, Utah	Defeated Christian Connors and Paradise in a Triple Threat Match for the vacant title. Odwun became dual champion, also being UCW-Zero Tag Team Champions with Christian Connors.
