= UCW-Zero Tag Team Championship =

Professional wrestling championship

Details
- Promotion: Ultra Championship Wrestling-Zero
- Date established: March 2003
- Date retired: November 30, 2013
Statistics
- First champions: Los Mochis (Paco and Pedro)
- Final champions: 801 District (Paco and Junior X)

The UCW-Zero Tag Team Championship is the primary tag team title in Ultra Championship Wrestling-Zero. It was first won by Los Mochis (Paco and Pedro) in March 2003 and defended throughout the state of Utah, most often in Salt Lake City, but also in the Rocky Mountains and the Southwest United States. The title was formerly recognized by AWA Superstars from 2005 to 2007, and then by the National Wrestling Alliance when the promotion became an NWA territory that same year.

== Title history ==
Wrestler:	Times:	Date:	Location:	Notes:
Los Mochis (Paco & Pedro)	1	March 2003		
Jason Ray & Stevie Slick	1	March 15, 2003	Salt Lake City, Utah	
Title vacated in early-2003.'
Los Mochis (Paco & Damien)	2	May 16, 2003		Defeated ERA to win the vacant titles.
Title history unrecorded'
No Fat Chicks (Derrick Jannetty & Charles Shipwright)	1	December 6, 2003		
Title history unrecorded'
Tristan Gallo & Justin Wilde	1	June 2004		
Tyson Ferrari & Jeff Matthew Bryant	1	June 18, 2004	Salt Lake City, Utah	
European Union (Adrian Blade & Rain McCreede)	1	November 2004		
Tyson Ferrari & Jeff Matthew Bryant	2	December 2004		
Title history unrecorded'
Team Climazzz (G.Q. Gallo & Tristan Gallo)	1	November 27, 2005		
Los Mochi Paco & Tyson Ferrari	1	March 31, 2006	Casa Grande, Arizona	
Los Mochis (Paco & Damien)	2	May 15, 2006	Salt Lake City, Utah	Damien reunited with Paco when Ferrari walked out on Paco during a match.
High Rollaz (Blitz & Jeff Matthew Bryant)	1	June 24, 2006	Salt Lake City, Utah	Won titles from Paco and Guerrero Azteca, substituting for Damien.
Los Mochis (Paco & Guerrero Azteca)	1	July 28, 2007	Salt Lake City, Utah	Won titles in a six-man tag team match with Konnan against High Rollaz and Stevie Slick.
Total Control (Tristan Gallo & Devan Payne)	1	September 4, 2006	Provo, Utah	Won titles in best 2-of-3 falls match.
High Risk (Derrick Jannetty & Radical Ricky)	1	December 2, 2006	Salt Lake City, Utah	
Cassidy & Dallas Murdock	1	August 31, 2007	Provo, Utah	Won titles in a handicap match against Derrick Jannetty.
Paco & Blitz	1	May 17, 2008	West Jordan, Utah	
Stevie Slick & Devan Payne	1	September 6, 2008	West Jordan, Utah	Won titles in handicap match when Blitz did not arrive for the match.
Stevie Slick & Dallas Murdock	1	July 18, 2009		Murdock replaces Payne as Slick's partner.
Eccentric Lion & Jayson Cash	1	August 22, 2009	Murray, Utah	Won titles from Dallas Murdock & Kid Cade, substituting for Stevie Slick.
Paco & Jr-X	1	December 19, 2009	Murray, Utah	Defeated Lion & Cash in a Tables, Ladders, & Chairs match.
Wild Bunch (Deavud the Destroyer & Zack James)	1	2010		Won the titles sometime after May 29, 2010.
CJ Ramos & Guerrero Azteca	1	November 20, 2010	Salt Lake City, Utah	
Dream Team (Stevie Slick & Tyler Cintron)	1	January 19, 2011	Salt Lake City, Utah	
Dream Team (Stevie Slick & Protege)	1	2011		Cintron decided to focus on singles competition and was replaced by Protege.
God Squad (Paco and Bronson)	1	November 19, 2011	Salt Lake City, Utah	
Salt City Masquerade (Junior X & Zack James)	1	January 28, 2012	Salt Lake City, Utah	
Guerrero Azteca & Validus	1	March 31, 2012	Salt Lake City, Utah	Won the titles at the UCW-Zero Ten Year Anniversary show.
Regulators (Cassidy & Dallas Murdock)	2	July 28, 2012	Salt Lake City, Utah	
Title vacated in October 2012.
American Pitbulls (Craig Stevens & Jason Jaxon)	1	October 20, 2012	Salt Lake City, Utah	Won the vacant titles in a tournament.
Martin Casaus & Derrick Jannetty	1	March 23, 2013	Salt Lake City, Utah	
American Pitbulls	2	April 20, 2013	Salt Lake City, Utah	
The Foundation (Martin Casaus & Derrick Jannetty)	2	October 19, 2013	Salt Lake City, Utah	Defeated American Pitbulls and Paco & Junior X in a three way elimination match.
801 District (Paco & Junior X)	2	November 30, 2013	Salt Lake City, Utah	Won the titles in a cage match at Incarceration.
