= American Digger (TV series) =

- Genre: Reality
- Starring: Ric Savage
- Country of origin: United States
- No. of seasons: 2
- No. of episodes: 26

Production
- Running time: 22 minutes

Original release
- Network: Spike
- Release: March 21, 2012 – April 13, 2013

American Digger is an American reality television series airing on Discovery Networks. The show follows former professional wrestler Frank Huguelet (aka Ric Savage) and his company American Savage as they search the United States for buried historical artifacts. The second season of the show was retitled Savage Family Diggers as Savage's wife Rita and son Nick join the crew.

On August 7, 2012, Spike TV announced that American Digger had been renewed for a second thirteen-episode season. Filming of the new season began Fall 2012 and aired in Spring 2013.

== Description ==
The series focuses on Savage and his crew as they travel across the United States searching for buried artifacts. Searching historical documents, the team attempts to find locations that may contain artifacts that can be located using a variety of tools including shovels, pickaxes and metal detectors. The crew has to negotiate with the various land owners for permission to dig on their land. Due to many Americans being protective of their land it can be quite harrowing trying to find locations to dig. When valuable artifacts are discovered they are taken to various collectors and sold at which time the money would be split (ratio 20:80) between the land owner and Savage's team. The show has a famous catchphrase, "Boom Baby!" which is said by Savage every time the team would find something big.

== The Savage Crew ==
- Ric Savage
- Rita Savage (married Ric in 1999).
- Giuseppe "G" Savage, Ric's and Rita's eldest son.
- Nick Savage, their youngest son.
- Rue Shumate, 43 (left the crew)
- Bob Buttafuso (left the crew)

== Controversies ==
Professor of anthropology at the University of Florida Susan Gillespie criticized American Digger as well as the National Geographic Channel show "Diggers", saying, "Our main issue is that these shows promote the destruction and selling of artifacts which are part of our cultural heritage and patrimony."

The American Anthropological Association protested the show's presentation of archaeology as a "treasure-seeking adventure, in which our collective heritage is dug up and sold for monetary gain." Ric Savage's column in American Digger magazine was cancelled. The publisher also filed a trademark infringement lawsuit against Viacom. Viacom reported that it obtained a license for the trademark.

The issues regarding American Diggers stretch beyond anthropology. Hobby metal detectorists also detest the show, claiming it to be a “disgrace” to the hobby. The TV show exaggerates success, encouraging people who would otherwise have no interest in metal detecting to go out and buy expensive equipment. The hobbyists say it doesn’t take an expert to know that something about the show doesn’t seem right. According to them finding so many rare objects, in quick succession, all on one episode is just not possible. American Diggers claiming to be an unscripted reality TV show gives people impressions of the hobby that could be damaging.

== Savage Family Diggers ==
In December 2012, Spike TV announced that American Digger would be renamed Savage Family Diggers for its second season premiering January 30, 2013, at 10:30pm. The name change better reflects the crew in the second season which adds Savage's wife Rita and son Nick to the dig team.

== Episodes ==
=== American Digger ===
No.	Title	Original release date
1	"Ice Cold Gold"	March 21, 2012
2	"Motor City Money"	March 28, 2012
3	"Savage Shark Hunt"	April 4, 2012
4	"Moonshine Money"	April 11, 2012
5	"Cherokee Treasure Trove"	April 18, 2012
6	"The Bowels of Brooklyn"	April 25, 2012
7	"Blood, Sweat, and Money"	May 2, 2012
8	"New World Treasure"	May 9, 2012
9	"Unearthing Controversy"	May 16, 2012
10	"Mob Money"	May 23, 2012
11	"Spoils of War"	May 30, 2012
12	"The Fountain of Cash"	June 6, 2012
13	"Buried Bucks in the Bayou"	June 6, 2012

=== Savage Family Diggers ===
No.	Title	Original release date
1	"Devil Dug Down to Georgia"	January 30, 2013
2	"History of Hookers"	January 30, 2013
3	"America's First Fight Club"	February 6, 2013
4	"Pirate's Booty Calls"	February 13, 2013
5	"The Real Moby Dick"	February 20, 2013
6	"Mansion Money"	March 2, 2013
7	"Fear No Evil"	March 9, 2013
8	"Virginia Is for Prisoners"	March 16, 2013
9	"In Perfect Harmony"	March 23, 2013
10	"Mormon War"	March 30, 2013
11	"Dr. Quarantine"	April 6, 2012
12	"The Original, Original Sin City"	April 13, 2013
13	"Bomb Baby!"	April 13, 2013
