= UCW-Zero Heavyweight Championship =

Professional wrestling championship

Details
- Promotion: Ultra Championship Wrestling-Zero
- Date established: January 18, 2003
- Current champion: Trey Matthews
- Date won: October 12, 2019
Statistics
- First champion: Blitz
- Most reigns: Martin Casaus (6 reigns)

The UCW-Zero Heavyweight Championship is the primary singles championship title in Ultra Championship Wrestling-Zero. It was first won by Blitz Mason in March 2003 and defended throughout the state of Utah, most often Salt Lake City, Utah, but also in the Rocky Mountains and the Southwest United States. The title was formerly recognized by AWA Superstars from 2005 to 2007, and then by the National Wrestling Alliance when the promotion became an NWA territory that same year. On February 26, 2011, the UCW-Zero Heavyweight Championship was around the waist of Los Mochis Paco until it was stolen by Tyler Cintron after Junior X attacked Paco. Later, Paco retrieved his belt back from Tyler Cintron. The following show however, Tyler Cintron walks into the ring with his own UCW-Zero Heavyweight Championship. UCW Director Blitz decide to make a Triple Threat TLC Match to determine the Undisputed UCW-Zero Heavyweight Champion which took place on June 4, 2011. Los Mochis Paco was the victor to become the Undisputed Heavyweight Champion. It would however be short lived because Los Mochis Paco was attacked by Black Out in the back and broke his leg and was unable to defend it. Two Weeks later on June 18, 2011, Director for the night and Former 4 time UCW-Zero Heavyweight Champion Martin Casaus made a Gauntlet Match to determine a New Champion. In the end, it was Junior X that prevailed and became the NEW UCW-Zero Heavyweight Champion. 2011 Rocky Mountain Rumble Champion Kid Kade went on to win the UCW-Zero Heavyweight Champion after defeating Junior X at "Meltdown Mayhem" on August 13, 2011.

== Title history ==
Wrestler:	Times:	Date:	Location:	Notes:
Blitz	1	January 18, 2003	Salt Lake City, Utah	APW Heavyweight Championship was converted to the UCW-Zero Heavyweight with the inception of Ultra Championship Wrestling-Zero
Validus	1	February 18, 2003	Salt Lake City, Utah	
Blitz	2	March 17, 2003	Layton, Utah	
Validus	1	August 22, 2003	Salt Lake City, Utah	
Title was stripped'
Mastodon	1	March 23, 2004	Salt Lake City, Utah	Mastodon pinned Blitz to win the vacated championship
Charles Shipwright	1	April 21, 2004	Salt Lake City, Utah	
Mastodon	2	May 28, 2004	Salt Lake City, Utah	
Blitz	3	July 15, 2004	Salt Lake City, Utah	
Los Mochi Damien	1	November 12, 2004	Salt Lake City, Utah	
Derrick Jannetty	1	January 17, 2005		
Title was stripped'
"JMB" Jeff Matthew Bryant	1	2005	Salt Lake City, Utah	JMB won a tournament to win title after it was held up due to Jannety's back injury.
Blitz	4	July 10, 2005		
JMB	2	September 23, 2005		
Derrick Jannetty	2	May 20, 2006	Salt Lake City, Utah	Won title in a death match at Final Retribution.
Tristan Gallo	1	July 28, 2006	Salt Lake City, Utah	
David Young	1	January 20, 2007	Salt Lake City, Utah	
Devan Payne	1	February 17, 2007	Salt Lake City, Utah	
Tristan Gallo	2	May 12, 2007	Salt Lake City, Utah	
Validus	2	June 29, 2007	Salt Lake City, Utah	
Tristan Gallo	3	August 3, 2007	Salt Lake City, Utah	
Guerrero Azteca	1	July 18, 2009	Murray, Utah	
Tristan Gallo	4	September 4, 2009	Provo, Utah	Won title in a 3-Way Dance with Cassidy.
Guerrero Azteca	2	September 5, 2009	Provo, Utah	
Title was stripped'
TyTan	1	October 24, 2009	Murray, Utah	Defeated Tristan Gallo and Blitz in a 3-Way Dance to win the vacant title.
Paco	1	May 8, 2010	Murray, Utah	
Dallas Murdock	1	August 28, 2010	Salt Lake City, Utah	
Paco	2	November 5, 2010	Salt Lake City, Utah	Pinned Tristan Gallo in a Triple Match which included Dallas Murdock at Cold Vengeance.
Junior X	1	June 18, 2011	Salt Lake City, Utah	Won Gauntlet Match after Paco was stripped due to injury.
Kid Kade	1	August 13, 2011	Salt Lake City, Utah	Won Rocky Mountain Rumble on July 30, 2011 and pinned Junior X at Meltdown Mayhem.
Cassidy	1	December 17, 2011	Salt Lake City, Utah	
Tyler Cintron	1	March 31, 2012	Salt Lake City, Utah	UCW-Zero Ten Year Anniversary show.
Derrick Jannetty	3	June 2, 2012	Salt Lake City, Utah	
Jayson Bravo	1	October 6, 2012	Salt Lake City, Utah	
Guerrero Azteca	3	June 15, 2013	Salt Lake City, Utah	
Jayson Bravo	2	July 2, 2013	Salt Lake City, Utah	
Martin Casaus (Tristan Gallo)	5	August 25, 2013	Salt Lake City, Utah	Defeated Bravo and Los Mochi Paco in a triple threat match.
Jason Jaxon	1	November 30, 2013	Salt Lake City, Utah	Defeated Casaus in a cage match at Incarceration.
Zack James	1	March 22, 2014	Salt Lake City, Utah	Defeated Jaxon and Dallas Murdock in a triple threat match; UCW-Zero 12th Anniversary show.
Martin Casaus	6	May 10, 2014	Salt Lake City, Utah	
Dallas Murdock	2	September 1, 2014	Provo, Utah	
VACANT	-	November 8, 2014		
Big Vig	1	December 9, 2014	Salt Lake City, Utah	
Tyler Cintron	2	February 21, 2015	Salt Lake City, Utah	
Dallas Murdock	3	May 16, 2015	Salt Lake City, Utah	
Manny Fresh	1	August 15, 2015	Salt Lake City, Utah	
Bronson	1	December 6, 2015	Salt Lake City, Utah	
Blitz	5	March 14, 2016	Salt Lake City, Utah	
Zack James	1	May 17, 2016	Salt Lake City, Utah	
Title history unrecorded
Deacon of Doom	1	March 9, 2019	Salt Lake City, Utah	Defeated Jeff Orcutt and Tyler Cintron in a Triple Threat match for the vacant title.
Mr. D (Derrick Jannetty)	4	July 13, 2019	Salt Lake City, Utah	Defeated Deacon of Doom after winning the Rocky Mountain Rumble a month prior.
Trey Matthews	1	October 12, 2019	Salt Lake City, Utah	Defeated Mr.D in a Six-Man WarGames Elimination match. Also included Tony Nova, Blake Grayson, Guerrero Azteca and Bobby Jaxon.
