= Ric Savage =

American retired professional wrestler (born 1969)

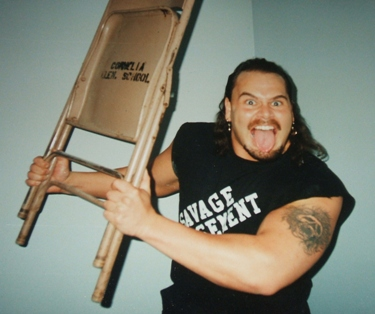

Personal information
- Born: Frances Huguelet; June 5, 1969 (age 57) Sylva, North Carolina

Professional wrestling career
- Ring name(s): Ric Rage; Ric Savage
- Billed height: 6 ft 5 in (1.96 m)
- Billed weight: 290 lb (130 kg)
- Billed from: Sylva, North Carolina
- Trained by: Ivan Koloff; Chuck Justice
- Debut: 1991
- Retired: 1997

Frank Huguelet (born June 5, 1969) is an American retired professional wrestler, better known by his ring name "Heavy Metal" Ric Savage. He was the host of Savage Family Diggers, a reality treasure hunting show airing on Spike TV. He also conducts haunted "ghost tours" in Gettysburg, Pennsylvania.

Huguelet wrestled across the eastern seaboard of the U.S. from 1990 until 1997. While spending much of his career in the independent circuits, he also wrestled for the National Wrestling Alliance, United States Wrestling Association, Extreme Championship Wrestling, World Championship Wrestling and National Championship Wrestling.

== Professional wrestling career ==
=== Early career ===
Huguelet broke into the wrestling business in the independent circuit in western North Carolina. He was trained initially in a garage in Waynesville, North Carolina, by Chuck Justice, a high school friend. Savage then wrestled every independent show he could before getting his first television break with South Atlantic Pro Wrestling in 1991 in a televised match against Chief Wahoo McDaniel. Savage then trained briefly under the "Russian Bear" Ivan Koloff at his school in Indian Trails, North Carolina.

=== Professional Wrestling Federation ===
Huguelet went to work for the Professional Wrestling Federation owned by Gary Sabaugh (The Italian Stallion) and George South. Savage would compete against Nelson Knight and Bobby Knight before the pair went to the World Wrestling Federation as Men on a Mission. He also wrestled "Mean" Mark Canterbury.

=== World Championship Wrestling ===
Sabaugh booked Huguelet with World Championship Wrestling where he would perform at several television tapings in 1992, but was used as a jobber. Huguelet left WCW at the advice of friend and mentor Jimmy Valiant, to wrestle for Jerry Lawler's United States Wrestling Alliance.

=== United States Wrestling Alliance ===
Huguelet would only work for USWA for a week due to a desire at that point to leave professional wrestling and begin preparing for a career in law. While working for Lawler, Huguelet feuded with Skull Von Krush. He would also wrestle Tommy Rich, Eddie Gilbert, and The Moondogs. Huguelet had the opportunity to work with the Rock 'n' Roll Express, where he would build a friendship with Ricky Morton. After Huguelet left the USWA, he began to focus more on college and wrestled on the independent circuit to pay his bills. He toured with Jimmy Valiant for several months. Huguelet also tried a brief, unofficial cross-promotion with 1980s glam metal band Quiet Riot, but the venture was not a success.

=== National Wrestling Alliance ===
Huguelet wrestled for the National Wrestling Alliance, where he was booked by former Four Horsemen member Tully Blanchard, and was managed by former Freebird Michael P.S. Hayes. Huguelet had formed a tag-team with a biker gimmick called the Hard Riders with Frankee Lawless (Mark Cavnar) and the pair became the leading "heel" tag-team in the new NWA wrestling federation based out of the Sportatorium in Dallas, Texas, and run by pioneer professional wrestling promoter Jim Crockett, Jr. The Hard Riders feuded with brothers Chris and Mark Youngblood. The Hard Riders also competed against Ahmed Johnson, Greg Valentine, Chris Adams, C. W. Anderson and the Junkyard Dog. Huguelet and Lawless met an obscure brother duo at this time that would influence Huguelet's later career. The team was Matt and Jeff Hardy. Huguelet would work closely with the Hardy's for the remainder of his time in wrestling. The Hard Riders drifted apart after Crockett folded in 1996.

=== Extreme Championship Wrestling ===
In 1996, after getting his bachelor's degree from Western Carolina University, Huguelet and travelling partner Kid Kash rode to Philadelphia to get work with Extreme Championship Wrestling at the suggestion of Savage's friends New Jack and Rob Van Dam. Huguelet wrestled several house shows as Shane Douglas' Bounty Hunter in an ongoing feud with The Pitbulls. Paul Heyman had Huguelet change his name to Ric Rage to avoid any conflicts with WCW over "Macho Man" Randy Savage. Huguelet left ECW after a few months, but Kash stayed on. After ECW, Huguelet went back to the independent circuit. During this time he made a regional television promo with Rickey Medlocke of Blackfoot, now the lead guitarist of Lynyrd Skynyrd. The promo was aimed at curbing domestic violence against women in western North Carolina but never aired. Huguelet also made some regional talkshow appearances as well.

=== Independent circuit ===
Huguelet and Cavnar reunited The Hard Riders when Ric Flair offered the team a shot to try out for WCW where they had a dark match the following week at Center Stage in Atlanta. The gimmick did not go over with WCW fans and was dropped. Huguelet then went back to the independent circuit as a single's wrestler and changed his look to a grunge rocker. His old friend from the NWA Ahmed Johnson introduced him to Chief Jay Strongbow at a WWF show. Strongbow scheduled a dark match for Savage in Fayetteville, North Carolina. But Strongbow suffered a massive heart attack and was released from the WWF before he could return. Huguelet's dark match fell through the cracks.

=== National Championship Wrestling ===
Huguelet teamed for a while with Bull Buchanan in a team called "Body Count" in National Championship Wrestling which was a promotion owned by Huguelet's longtime manager and friend Steve Martin. But Buchanan was first signed by Jim Cornette's Smoky Mountain Wrestling and later by the World Wrestling Federation causing him to leave Body Count. Huguelet then teamed in Body Count with David Young and Rusty Riddle. Riddle turned on Huguelet and joined Kid Kash and feuded with Huguelet and Young for the NCW world tag titles. It was in 1996 that Huguelet partnered with Martin in National Championship Wrestling, and Huguelet began to help create the wrestler's characters, storylines, and do interview coaching. NCW did monthly television tapings from Huguelet's hometown of Sylva, North Carolina. Notable wrestlers that worked for NCW during that time are Matt and Jeff Hardy, Brad Cain (Lodi), Shannon Moore, Ricky Morton of the Rock 'n' Roll Express, Bull Buchanan, Kid Kash, Jason Arhndt (Joey Abs of the Mean Street Posse), Rick Michaels, and Chris Hamrick. NCW later became NWA Wildside and was briefly syndicated after Huguelet left the promotion.

=== Retirement ===
After suffering from a left knee reconstruction, and three lower back surgeries, Huguelet retired from professional wrestling in 1997. Initially, he moved to Gettysburg, Pennsylvania, where he performed a live storytelling presentation called Haunted Gettysburg for author Bob Wasel at the now defunct Conflict Theater. It was in Gettysburg that Huguelet met his wife Rita. They have three children and two recent grandchildren. In 1998, Huguelet moved his family to New Jersey, where they lived until moving to Virginia in 2009.

Huguelet is very interested in American history, in particular the Civil War. He is an avid artifacts collector, and maintains a website that assists collectors in identifying fake Civil War and World War II relics. He enjoys metal detecting across the country for historical artifacts. Since 2007 Huguelet has written a column for American Digger magazine called The Savage Facts that provides tips on identifying fraudulent Civil War and other militaria collectibles. He has done lectures for Civil War roundtables, metal detecting clubs, and other historical organizations across the United States on avoiding the pitfalls of buying fake or misrepresented militaria items. It was announced on August 10, 2011, that Spike TV bought 13 episodes of the new reality show, American Digger, featuring Huguelet and his team of artifact recovery experts. However, the concept of the show is being protested by a number of archaeological and historical institutions, including the Society for American Archaeology and the American Institute of Archaeology, as promoting illegal looting and destroying shared cultural history.

In April 2013, American Digger magazine stated that they would no longer have any association with Rick Savage, saying, "We won’t lie, our dropping his association was in great part because of the controversy his TV show has created, and the confusion that American Digger Magazine had anything more than a passing association with the Spike TV series which shares our name." According to Huffington Post, the American Anthropological Association sent Spike TV a letter "urging [the network] to withdraw or modify the contents" of "American Digger" because it "wrongly represents archaeology as a treasure-seeking adventure, in which our collective heritage is dug up and sold for monetary gain."

=== Savage Family Diggers (previously American Digger) ===
In 2012 American Digger debuted on Spike TV. The show performed well and drew an average audience of 1.2 million viewers weekly. Huguelet and his crew of artifact recovery experts dug on private property in Tombstone, AZ, Brooklyn, NY, Detroit, MI, Mechanicsville, Jamestown, and Middletown, VA, Chicago, IL, Venice, LA, St. Augustine, FL, Asheville and Sylva, NC, Girdwood, AK, and Aiken, SC. It was announced in August 2012 by Spike TV that another 13 episodes of American Digger had been ordered and would be filmed in the fall and winter with a planned airtime in spring 2013. American Digger is produced by Gurney Productions who also produce Duck Dynasty, Auction Hunters, American Guns, Hollywood Treasure and Haunted Collector as well as many Shark Week specials. One of the signature points on the show is when Huguelet yells his catch-phrase "boom baby" after a significant discovery. The phrase is popular with show fans and has been made into both T-shirts and ringtones.

In December 2012, Spike TV announced that American Digger would be renamed Savage Family Diggers for its second season premiering January 30, 2013, saying the name change better reflects the crew which adds Savage's wife Rita and son Nick to the dig team. Highlights from the second season would be a dig with Emmy nominated actor Bill Paxton and his son James, a dig lead to Memphis, Tennessee from Lynyrd Skynyrd guitarist Rickey Medlocke, a hunt for Blackbeard's treasure, and a tour of one of America's Gilded Age havens, loaded with mansions of the early elite.

=== The Savage~Turner Rock Express Radio Show/Podcast ===
In November 2013, Ric Savage and Erik Turner of '80's powerhouse Band, Warrant (American band), joined forces to create The Savage~Turner Rock Express Radio Show. The show airs Saturday and Sunday nights at 10p EST on the KZOI / KZOY FM stations located in Sioux City, Iowa and Sioux Falls, SD. The show streams worldwide at Sunnyradio.com. The show consists of Savage and Turner interviewing guests from a diversity of fields from rock musicians to professional wrestlers. Guests have included: Rickey Medlocke of Lynyrd Skynyrd, actor Peter Sherayko, Gary Hoey, Matt Hardy, and other notable personages from all genres of entertainment. The interviews are punctuated with music from artists from the '80's through today. The show used to contain a weekly fitness tip from Todd Howard, star of Spike TV's Worlds Worst Tenants, and also a special segment with Rock legend Carmine Appice, former drummer for Rod Stewart, Ozzy Osbourne, and Vanilla Fudge. He is currently the drummer of The Rascals.

The radio show became a podcast in 2016, and it is hosted on SoundCloud. Guests have included Nick Searcy, John Moyer of Disturbed, Ambassador Scott Brown and more.

=== “Born to be Wild” Single and Video ===
In March 2016 Ric Savage teamed up with Danger Danger frontman Ted Poley and Trixter guitar wizard Steve Brown to do a heavy metal remake of the iconic Steppenwolf hit, Born to be Wild. They were joined by the legendary Carmine Appice on drums, “The Fretless Monster” Tony Franklin from Whitesnake on bass, and Mike Orlando of Adrenaline Mob on lead guitar. The single was released by Rocker Records, and the video was shot in New Jersey and is available on YouTube. Greg Smith, bass player for Ted Nugent played the bass track on the video.

== Championships and accomplishments ==
- Great American Wrestling Federation
  - GAWF Southern Heavyweight Championship (1 time)
- International Wrestling Alliance
  - IWA United States Heavyweight Championship (1 time)
- National Championship Wrestling
  - NCW World Tag Team Championship (2 times) – with Rusty Riddle (1) and David Young (1)
- Southeastern Wrestling Alliance
  - SWA World Heavyweight Championship (2 times)
- Western Carolina Wrestling
  - WCW Southeastern Regional Six-Man Tag Team Championship – with Chief Wahoo McDaniel and Tommy Gunn (1)
