= Wrestling mask =

Professional wrestling ring gear

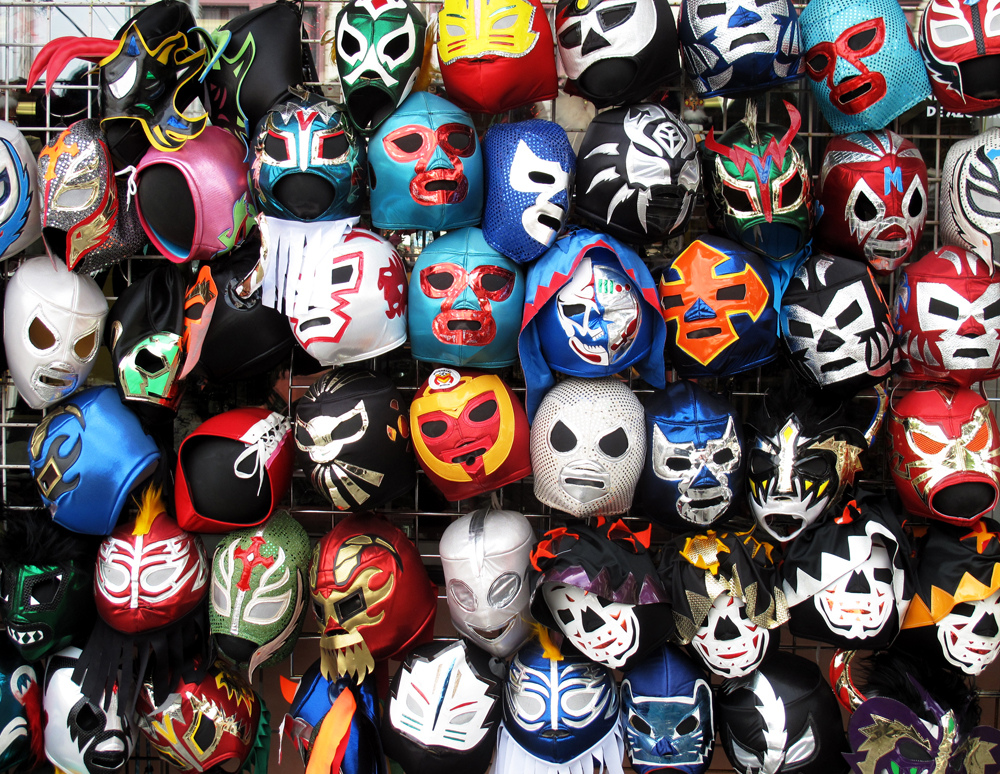
A selection of lucha libre (Mexican wrestling) masks sold at stores.

A wrestling mask is a fabric-based mask that some professional wrestlers wear as part of their in-ring persona or gimmick. Professional wrestlers have been using masks as far back as 1867. and they are still widely used today, especially in Mexican lucha libre.

== History ==
Legend has it, at the 1865 World's Fair, Theobaud Bauer debuted the mask, wrestling as "The Masked Wrestler" in Paris, France. He continued wrestling using the mask throughout France as part of a circus troupe in the 1860s before moving on to the United States in the early 1870s. Historians are unable to verify this legend due to no records of a "World's Fair" accruing in 1865 at Paris, France. No reports exist for a masked wrestler debuting at Paris's 1867, World's Fair either.

On December 14, 1874, The Charlotte Democrat, reported on an interesting story from Bucharest Romania about an open challenge made by local wrestler, Jules Rigal being accepted by a gentleman wishing to remain anonymous. The gentleman was a masked wrestler named "The Great Unknown", and rumored to have been Prince Stourja, a Moldavian nobleman with a reputation of Herculean strength. The success of this match lead to the several successful nightly rematches between the two opponents. One night a talkative member of the troupe let it slip that "The Great Unknown" was another clown from this circus. The Bucharest crowd became aware of this and lead to a disturbance that cause "The Great Unknown", the manager, and their troupe to narrowly escape being torn apart by the crowd. The police succeeded in suppressing what seemed to be a serious riot brewing that night. This event was the earliest documented masked wrestler in Romania and the earliest pro wrestling riot.

On Saturday, February 21, 1891, San Antonio's The Light, reported on an upcoming wrestling event being held at San Antonio's historic Washington Theatre: "There will be a large crowd at the Washington theatre next Monday night to witness Christol wrestling with the masked unknown. Who the masked wrestler is, nobody knows, but that he is very expert, there can be no doubt."

In 1915, Mort Henderson started wrestling as the "Masked Marvel" in the New York area making him the second earliest North American wrestler to perform with such a gimmick. In the subsequent years many wrestlers would put on a mask after they had been used in an area, or territory, that their popularity and drawing ability diminished, it would be an easy way for a wrestler to begin working in a new area as a "fresh face". Sometimes workers wore masks in one territory and unmasked in another territory in order to keep their two identities separate.

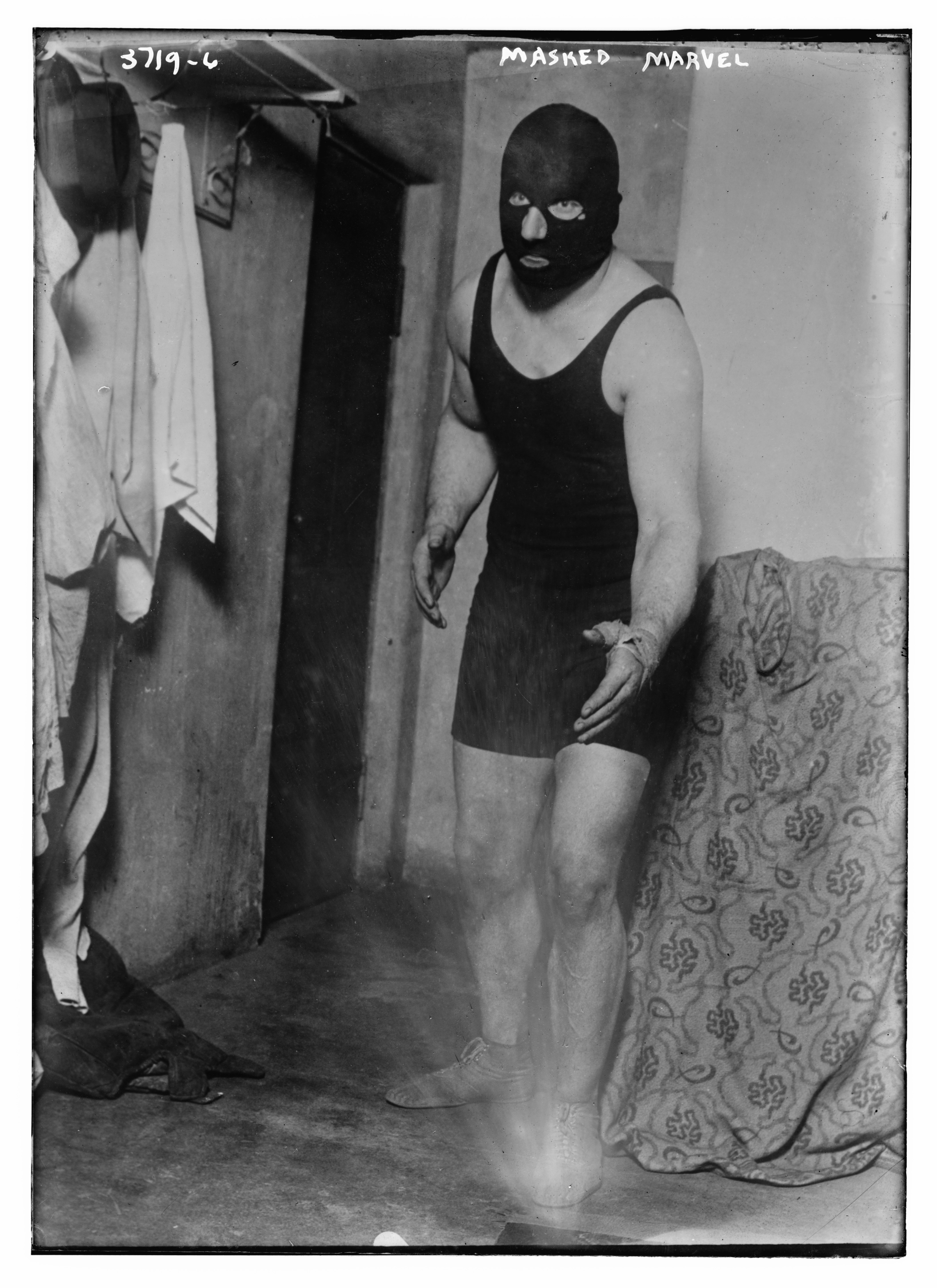
Henderson as the Masked Marvel

=== US and Canada ===
Many wrestlers have had very successful careers while masked such as The Destroyer/Dr. X, Mr. Wrestling, Masked Superstar and the Spoiler. In the days where professional wrestling was more regional, with less national television coverage, it was not uncommon for more than one person or team to use the same gimmick and mask, and there have at times been several masked "Interns", "Assassins" and "Executioners" working simultaneously. Tag team wrestling has seen more masked teams, using identical masks to create unity between wrestlers. Successful masked teams include the Masked Assassins, Blue Infernos and the Grapplers.

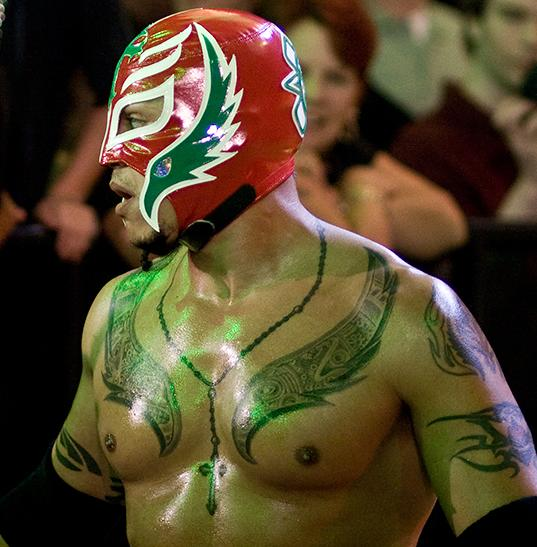
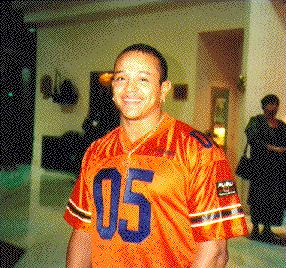
Rey Mysterio is one of the most notable masked wrestlers in the US, although he was unmasked in World Championship Wrestling (right)

One of the best-known North American masked wrestlers was Big Van Vader, who was also known for his in-ring agility despite his large frame during the 1980s and 1990s. Other notable examples are Rey Mysterio, Mankind, Kane, Doom, Edge and Christian as 'Los Conquistadores', and Owen Hart as 'Blue Blazer'.

Today, masked wrestlers are not a common sight in the United States and Canada, but masked wrestlers have a long history in that region, dating back to 1891. A mask sometimes will be used by a well known wrestler in a storyline where they must get around various "stipulations" or betray a trust without revealing their true identity. For instance wrestlers who are suspended in a storyline return under a mask under another name, usually with it being very obvious who is under the mask. Examples of this include: Hulk Hogan as Mr. America, Dusty Rhodes as The Midnight Rider, André the Giant as Giant Machine, Brian Pillman as The Yellow Dog, The Miz as The Calgary Kid, Dan Marsh as Mr. X, and Bo Dallas as Mr. NXT. Jimmy Valiant once returned under a mask as Charlie Brown from Outta Town after losing to Paul Jones in a "Loser Leaves Town" match (a stipulation where the loser of the match must resign from the organization for which he worked). Mickie James also revealed to be under the mask when she returned to WWE as Alexa Bliss's partner.

=== Lucha libre ===
When I put on the mask, I'm transformed. The mask gives me strength. The mask gives me fame. The mask is magical. When I remove the mask, I'm a normal human who can walk right by you, and not even get a "hello". Usually with the mask on, everything is positive. Without the mask I'm a normal being who has his problems, who cries, who sometimes suffers. I could tell you that I really admire El Hijo del Santo. But do you know who I admire more? The human being. Thanks to him, El Hijo del Santo has a life. And this human being sometimes sacrifices a lot to give this other identity life.

— El Hijo del Santo

The luchador mask, known as a mascara in Spanish, "draws from Mexican history in which Mayans and Aztecs warriors [sic] would complete for superiority". The style of the masks represent "animals, gods, mythological figures and other elements of Mexican folklore".

"The mask is the luchador's identity, both in and out of the ring. Luchadores will keep their faces and real names a secret throughout their entire lives; some of the more iconic luchadores have even been buried in their mask."

WWE hall of famer El Santo is one of the most iconic luchadores. He "helped fuel the growth and reputation of lucha libre throughout the world". "WWE Hall of Famer Eddie Guerrero once wrote that 'Calling him a legend doesn't even do justice to how big he was. In his heyday, Santo was bigger than Hulk Hogan and 'Stone Cold' Steve Austin combined.'"

The Mexican fanbase took to the mystery of the masked man and soon after, Mexican wrestlers themselves started wearing masks, becoming enmascarados. Early masks were simple with strong, basic color designs that could be recognized even in the back row of the arena. Over the years, the masks evolved to become intricate and colorful, drawing on Mexico's rich history.

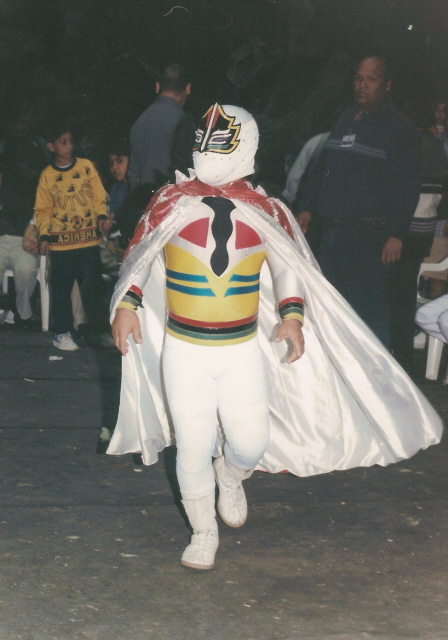
Luchador Mascarita Sagrada wearing a mascara (mask)

Lucha libre is still an incredibly popular sport in Mexico, with souvenir masks being sold at events and online. Masks are colorfully designed to evoke the images of animals, gods, ancient heroes, and other archetypes, whose identity the luchador takes on during a performance. Most wrestlers in Mexico start their career wearing a mask, but over the span of their careers, a substantial number of them will be unmasked. Sometimes, a wrestler slated for retirement will be unmasked in one of his final bouts or at the beginning of a final tour, signifying loss of identity as that character. Sometimes, losing the mask signifies the end of a gimmick, with the wrestler moving on to a new gimmick and mask, often without public acknowledgement of the wrestler's previous persona.

The wrestling mask is considered "sacred", so much so that the intentional removal of a mask is grounds for disqualification. If a wrestler is unmasked during the match, his top priority is to cover up his face and they usually get help from people at ringside to do so. Most masked wrestlers wear their masks for any and all public appearances, using the mask to keep their personal life separate from their professional life; because of the mask, most Mexican wrestlers enjoy a high degree of anonymity about their personal lives. Some wrestlers become larger-than-life characters, such as El Santo, one of the most popular cultural icons who always wore his mask in public, revealing his face only briefly in old age, and was even buried in his trademark silver mask.

==== Luchas de Apuestas ====
In lucha libre, the highest achievement is not winning a championship but winning the mask of an opponent in a lucha de apuesta, a "bet fight" where each wrestler bets their mask. The lucha de apuesta is usually seen as the culmination of a long and heated storyline between two or more wrestlers, with the winner getting the "ultimate victory". It is customary for the loser of such a match to reveal his real name, where he is from and how long he has been a wrestler before taking the mask off to show his face. Unmasked wrestlers will wager their hair instead, risking having his or her head shaved bald in case of defeat. There can be several reasons to book a lucha de apuesta beyond the obvious purpose of elevating the winner. If the loser is a younger wrestler, then the loss of the mask can sometimes lead to a promotional push after unmasking, or the wrestler being given a new ring persona. Older wrestlers often lose their masks during the last couple of years of their career, often for a big payday depending on how long and successful a career they have had; the more successful the wrestler that is unmasked, the bigger the honor for the winner.

The first lucha de apuesta was presented on July 14, 1940, at Arena México. The defending champion Murciélago was so much lighter than his challenger Octavio that he requested a further condition before he would sign the contract: Octavio would have to put his hair on the line. Octavio won the match and Murciélago was unmasked, giving birth to a tradition in lucha libre.

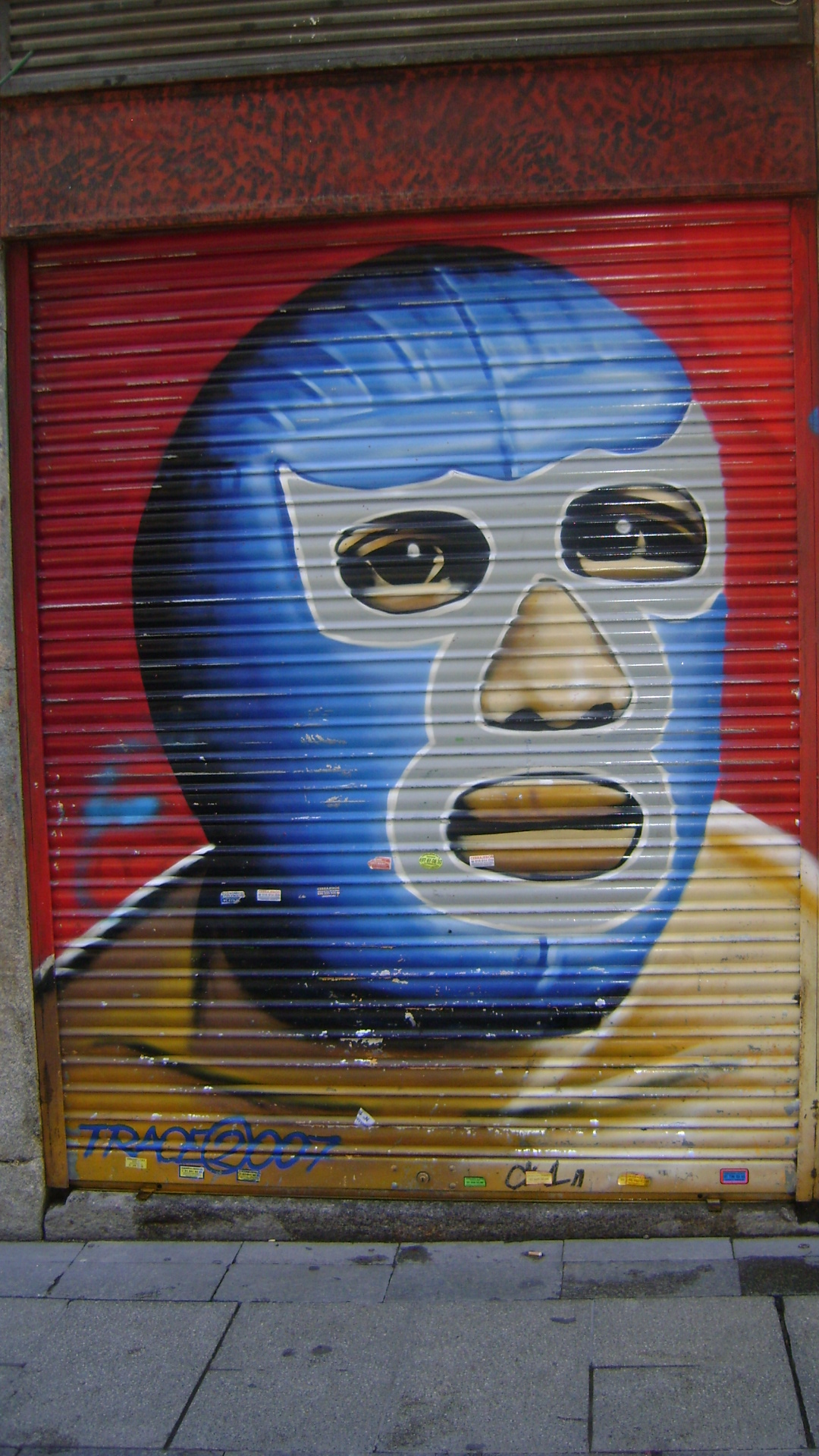
Blue Demon's wrestling mask mural in Madrid, Spain

High-profile luchas de apuestas include El Santo winning the mask of Black Shadow, Los Villanos winning the masks of all three of Los Brazos (El Brazo, Brazo de Oro and Brazo de Plata), Atlantis winning the mask of Villano III, La Parka unmasking both Cibernético and El Mesias, Villano V taking Blue Panther's mask, and Último Guerrero winning the mask of Villano V. Some wrestlers have made a career by the volume of masks they have won rather than the general quality of their opponents—wrestler Super Muñeco claims to have won over 100 masks, with at least 80 verifiable lucha de apuesta wins, while Estrella Blanca is said to have the most luchas de apuestas, with over 200 masks won.

=== Japanese wrestling ===
The Destroyer, an American, was the first masked wrestler to work in Japan during the 1960s but remained a novelty with very few Japanese wrestlers choosing to wear a mask. The first Japanese masked wrestler is considered to be Shozo Kobayashi, who briefly competed under a mask as Fukumen Taro ("Masked Taro"). In the 1970s Mil Máscaras became the first Mexican luchador to work on a regular basis and became very popular with the fans. The original Tiger Mask, Satoru Sayama, was inspired by Mil Máscaras to create the "Tiger Mask" persona. After the success of Tiger Mask several wrestlers have adopted the mask, mainly lighter wrestlers who like Sayama had a more high flying and flashy style. The wrestling mask is held in more regard by the Japanese fans than the North American fans but is not as "sacred" as the Mexican mask, meaning that the wrestler can perform both masked one day and unmasked another if he so wishes. Famous Japanese masked wrestlers include Jyushin Thunder Liger, Último Dragón, El Samurai, The Great Sasuke, Dragon Kid, and Bushi.

=== British wrestling ===
Although at live shows, masked wrestlers were as prolific in British wrestling as its American counterpart, they were largely kept off ITV's television coverage until the late 1960s. Successful masked wrestlers up until this point included Count Bartelli (Geoff Condliffe), the White Angel (Judo Al Hayes), and Doctor Death (promoter Paul Lincoln as the top villain of his own major independent promotion). Masked wrestlers were frequently disparaged by top promoters during this period as a symptom of the allegedly "anarchic" conditions in American wrestling; indeed, the first masked wrestler on ITV, The Outlaw (Gordon Nelson), was announced as being an American.

The most famous masked wrestler in British history, Peter Thornley, the original British version of Kendo Nagasaki, made his professional debut – complete with masked Samurai gimmick – in 1964 but did not appear on television until 1971. Nagasaki's first big victory was a win over mentor (and real life trainer) Bartelli in a 1966 mask vs mask match. His own mask was pulled off by opponent Big Daddy during a televised match in December 1975, an important landmark in Big Daddy's rise to popularity. Nagasaki later voluntarily unmasked in a ceremony in the ring on TV in December 1977. By 1986 he was back under the mask and was the top villain of All Star Wrestling from this point until his second retirement in 1993.

Another successful masked wrestler from the 1970s was blue-eye martial artist Kung Fu, played by Eddie Hamill (1943–2025), who lost his mask after a 1976 televised defeat by Mick McManus, but continued to wrestle unmasked still as Kung Fu, winning the British Heavy Middleweight Championship in 1986.

At Christmas 1979, Big Daddy defeated and unmasked Mr. X (Arthur Byce) on television. Subsequently, during the 1980s in Joint Promotions, masked wrestlers were generally built towards being fodder for Big Daddy to defeat, unmask and humiliate in headline tag matches on ITV, such as the Spoiler (Drew McDonald), King Kendo (aka Red Devil), Battle Star (Barry Douglas), El Diablo, the Black Baron, the Masked Marauders tag team, and The Emperor. Meanwhile in All Star Wrestling – apart from Nagasaki – they were mostly treated as short lived reflections of recent fads in popular culture. In 1995, All Star shows were frequently headlined by a masked tag team based on the Power Rangers franchise, until the copyright owners intervened. In the 21st century, El Ligero wrestled successfully for both the traditional and American-style promotions.

=== French wrestling ===
Bauer as the Masked Wrestler of Paris in the 1860s would be followed by more masked wrestlers in his home country. A wrestling mask was known in France as a cagoule (hood) and fans would often chant he he la cagoule to encourage the bon (babyface) to unmask a masked méchant (heel). Doing so, however, was banned under French wrestling rules – if unmasked, a wrestler would crouch on the mat face-down until the referee restored his mask. (This tactic was adopted by Mexican lucha libre (see above) and it became one of the reasons why masks became the rule there.)

One of the earliest successes of televised wrestling in France was the feud between babyface masked wrestler L'Ange Blanc (lit. 'The White Angel') and black-clad heel masked wrestler L'Homme Masqué (The Masked Man). It inspired the above-described Hayes–Lincoln feud in the UK. Another successful masked heel of the 1960s was Le Bourreau de Béthune (lit. 'The Executioner of Béthune'). Spanish wrestler Angelito initially wore a silver mask in France before taking it off midway through a 1971 televised match with Jacky Richard. Another Spaniard, Oscar "Crusher" Verdu, who wrestled under a mask as Der Henker (German for 'The Hangman'), would win the French Heavyweight Championship in 1983. Der Henker was previously played in the early 1970s by Remy Bayle. British wrestler Dave Larsen wrestled in France under a mask as Zarak. In the 1980s, masks were primarily worn as a component of more outlandish characters such as the tag teams Les Piranhas and Les Maniaks (a team of evil masked clowns) and Mambo Le Primitiv, based on the film character King Kong. This tradition continued in the early 21st century with Cybernic Machine, a masked wrestler playing a "computer virus" character, who was a successful heel in France.

== Anatomy of the wrestling mask ==
The original wrestling masks were often masks attached to a top that snapped in the groin making it very uncomfortable for the people wearing it. If the masks were not attached to the top, then they were made from uncomfortable material such as brushed pig skin, leather or suede. In the 1930s, a Mexican shoe maker called Antonio Martinez created a mask on request from Charro Aguayo that became the standard for wrestling masks created since then. The basic design consists of four pieces of fabric sewn together to create the basic shape that covers the entire head. The mask has openings for the eyes, nose and mouth with colorful trim around the open features, known as "Antifaz" in Spanish. The back of the mask is open with a "tongue" of fabric under laces to keep it tight enough to not come off accidentally during a match. The first variation in style came when the jaw and mouth area was removed from the mask to expose the skin. Other masks have solid material over the mouth, nose, eyes or all three, in the case of fabric covering the eyes a stretched fabric that is see through up-close is used.

Originally being made from fabric, masks have evolved and are now made from a variety of materials from cotton to nylon to various vinyl polymers in many different colours and patterns. Several additions have been made to the mask decorations over the years with the most prevalent and visually striking being foam horns and artificial hair attached to the mask. Mock ears are also commonly used, especially if the mask has an animal motif such as a tiger and other animals.

== See also ==
- List of masked wrestlers
- Professional wrestling in Mexico
