= List of masked wrestlers =

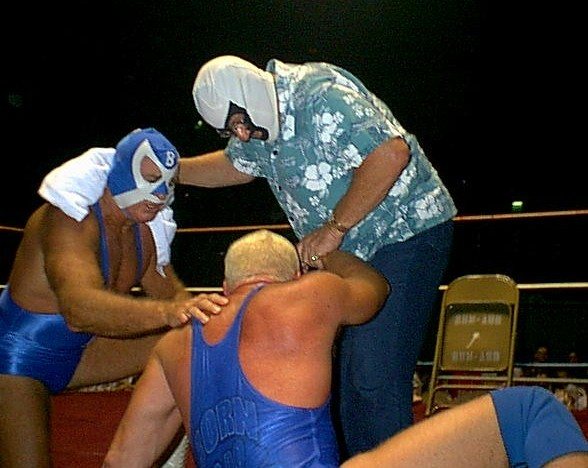
The Bullet (left) and Mr. Wrestling II (right), seen here with Scott Armstrong (center), were very popular in the NWA's Southeastern and Continental wrestling areas during the 1980s.

This is a list of masked wrestlers. The earliest known masked wrestler in the United States was The Masked Marvel who famously "crashed" the international tournament, which featured many of the top stars of the "Farmer" Burns-Frank Gotch era, held at the Manhattan Opera House in 1915. In North America, many professional wrestlers have traditionally worn masks after they had been used in an area, or "territory", that their popularity and drawing ability diminished, it would be an easy way for a wrestler to begin working in a new area as a "fresh face". Sometimes workers wore masks in one territory and unmasked in another territory in order to keep their two identities separate. Several wrestlers used one or two personas for their entire career such as The Destroyer (1962–1984), Mr. Wrestling (1965–1983) and Masked Superstar (1976–1986). Tony Atlas debuted as the Black Atlas in a feud with Randy Savage around 1976.

Wrestling masks also have a significant cultural importance in Mexican lucha libre, and Japanese puroresu to a lesser extent; famed professional wrestlers such as Blue Demon, Mil Máscaras and El Santo have achieved an almost iconic status in Mexico. In Japan, masked wrestlers are also very popular. Many are heavily influenced by anime and manga characters such as Tiger Mask and Black Tiger during the 1980s, and Jushin Thunder Liger in the ‘90s. Many of these stars would appear in World Championship Wrestling during the "Monday Night War" period.

In recent years, World Wrestling Entertainment has re-used masked characters for comedic purposes. Edge and Christian donned the masks worn by the WWF's original Los Conquistadores in their feud with World Tag Team Champions The Hardy Boyz in 2000. Under the guise of El Gran Luchadore, Paul London, Shannon Moore, Eddie Guerrero and Kurt Angle each challenged JBL for the WWE Championship in 2004. Likewise, El Generico and Shark Boy play a similar role on the independent circuit.

== List ==
=== Single wrestlers ===
Name	Promotion	Years Active	Country	Notes
Abismo Negro	AAA, Consejo Mundial de Lucha Libre	1997–2009	Mexico	Died after drowning.
Abyss	Total Nonstop Action Wrestling	2002–2019	United States	One of two masked wrestlers to have ever held the NWA World Heavyweight Championship.
Agent Orange	Pacific Northwest Wrestling, Mid-Eastern Wrestling Federation, Independent circuit	1983-2011	Canada	
Aigle Blanc	Independent circuit, WXW, AJPW, WWE	2014–present	France	
Aldo Montoya	World Wrestling Federation	1994–1997	Portugal	
American Dragon	New Japan Pro-Wrestling	2003–2004	United States	
The Apocalypse	Philippine Wrestling Revolution	2014–2022	Philippines	
Arachnaman	World Championship Wrestling	1991–1992	United States	
Australian Suicide	Lucha Libre AAA Worldwide	2013–2025	Australia	
Atlantis	Consejo Mundial de Lucha Libre	1983–	Mexico	
Avatar	World Wrestling Federation	1995-1996	China	
The Avenger (original)	Jim Crockett Promotions	1968–1980	Canada	Unmasked by The Spoiler in 1975.
The Avenger	Stampede Wrestling	1986	Canada	
Badstreet	World Championship Wrestling	1991	United States	
Bandido	All Elite Wrestling, Ring of Honor, Independent circuit	2011	Mexico	
Battle Kat	World Wrestling Federation	1990	United States	Replaced by Bob Bradley.
Battman	World Wide Wrestling Federation	1966–1970	United States	
Beetlejuice	Pacific Northwest Wrestling, World Championship Wrestling	1988–1990	United States	While wrestling in WCW, Barr wrestled under the name "The Juicer" due to copyright issues.
Big Van Vader	All Japan Pro Wrestling, New Japan Pro-Wrestling, World Championship Wrestling, World Wrestling Federation	1987–2017	United States	
Black Blood	World Championship Wrestling	1991	United States	
Black Cat	AAA, New Japan Pro-Wrestling, Universal Wrestling Association, World Championship Wrestling	1977–2006	Japan	
Black Scorpion	World Championship Wrestling	1990	United States	Played by Ric Flair and Al Perez.
Black Shadow	Consejo Mundial de Lucha Libre	1942-1981	Mexico	
Black Tiger	New Japan Pro-Wrestling	1982–	Japan	Arch-rival of Tiger Mask. Portrayed by Mark Rocco, Eddie Guerrero, Silver King, Rocky Romero and Tatsuhito Takaiwa.
Blitzkrieg	All Pro Wrestling, World Championship Wrestling	1994–2004	United States	Surrendered rights to the name to Jack Evans in 2004.
Blue Blazer	World Wrestling Federation	1988–1991; 1998–1999	Canada	Lost mask to El Canek in 1991. It was also portrayed by Steve Blackman, Phil Lafon, Tom Prichard and Koko B. Ware in 1998.
Blue Demon	Empresa Mexicana de Lucha Libre	1948–1989	Mexico	
The Bullet	Continental Championship Wrestling, Smoky Mountain Wrestling, World Championship Wrestling, NWA Wrestle Birmingham	1985–1989, 1993–1995, 1996, 2004-2007	United States	
Captain USA	World Class Championship Wrestling, Houston Wrestling	1977	United States	
Calgary Kid	World Wrestling Entertainment	2009	United States	Unmasked himself after the match as The Miz.
Captain Charisma	World Wrestling Entertainment	2004	United States	Unmasked himself after the match. it was The Miz
Carmella	World Wrestling Entertainment	2021-	United States	
Cat Burglar	Maryland Championship Wrestling, Mid-Eastern Wrestling Federation	1994–2012	United States	
Cien Caras	Consejo Mundial de Lucha Libre	1974–1990	Mexico	
Checkmate	World Class Championship Wrestling	1982–1983	United States	May have been portrayed by Welsh wrestler Tony Charles.
The Cheetah Kid	International World Class Championship Wrestling, Independent circuit	1978–1992	United States	
Christmas Creature	United States Wrestling Association	1992	United States	
The Claw	Pacific Northwest Wrestling, American Wrestling Association	1970–1972	United States	
CM Punk	World Wrestling Entertainment	2010	United States	
Cobra	New Japan Pro-Wrestling, World Wrestling Federation, Stampede Wrestling	1983–1986	Japan	
Command Bolshoi	JWP Joshi Puroresu, Pure-J	1991-2019	Japan	
Curry Man	Dragon Gate, Ring of Honor	2005; 2008–2009	Japan	
The Dark Patriot	Eastern Championship Wrestling, Global Wrestling Federation, United States Wrestling Association	1991–1994	United States	The Dark Patriot was unmasked by Brian Christopher in 1994.
The Dark Secret	Smokey Mountain Wrestling	1994	United States	
Delirious	Chikara, Jersey All Pro Wrestling, Pro Wrestling Noah, Ring of Honor	2001–	United States	
The Destroyer	National Wrestling Alliance, All-Japan Pro Wrestling	1962–1993	United States	
Deuce Wyld	Lucha Libre AAA Worldwide, Consejo Mundial de Lucha Libre, New Japan Pro-Wrestling	1986–1987	United States	
Dirty Yellow Dog	Florida Championship Wrestling	1983	United States	
Doomsday	United States Wrestling Association	1997	United States	
Dr. Feel Good	National Wrestling Alliance	1980s	United States	
Dr. Wagner	Empresa Mexicana de Lucha Libre, National Wrestling Alliance	1961–1985	Mexico	Unmasked by El Solitario in 1985.
Dr. Wagner, Jr.	Lucha Libre AAA Worldwide, Consejo Mundial de Lucha Libre, New Japan Pro-Wrestling	1986–	Mexico	
Dr. X	American Wrestling Alliance	1966–1972	United States	Unmasked by both Blackjack Lanza and Paul Diamond in 1970.
Dr. X	American Wrestling Association, Japan Wrestling Association	1959–1961	United States	Unmasked by both Verne Gagne and Bob Ellis in 1960, and Rikidōzan in 1961.
Dr. X	National Wrestling Alliance	1970–1978	United States	
Dr. X (Red Osborne)	National Wrestling Alliance, UWF Mid-South	1963-1978	United States	
Dr. X	Portland Wrestling	1977	United States	
Dr. X	Georgia Championship Wrestling	1982	United States	Unmasked by Dusty Rhodes and Tommy Rich in 1982.
Dr. X	World Championship Wrestling	1990–1991	United States	
Dr. X	World Wrestling Federation	1996–1998	United States	
Dr. X	Consejo Mundial de Lucha Libre	1995–2011	Mexico	Was murdered on October 11, 2011.
Dos Caras	Consejo Mundial de Lucha Libre, Universal Wrestling Association, World Wrestling Association	1970–2020	Mexico	
El Canek	Lucha Libre AAA Worldwide, Consejo Mundial de Lucha Libre, International Wrestling Revolution Group Universal Wrestling Association	1973–	Mexico	
El Katipunero	Manila Wrestling Federation	2022–2024	Philippines	
Espectro I	Empresa Mexicana de Lucha Libre	1953–1993	Mexico	
El Grande Diablo	World Class Championship Wrestling	1984–1985	Mexico	
El Gato	World Championship Wrestling	1996	United States	
El Generico	Pro Wrestling Guerrilla, Ring of Honor, CHIKARA	2002–2013	United States	Once he went to WWE, he went unmasked.
El Gran Luchadore	World Wrestling Entertainment	2004	United States	Portrayed by Paul London, Shannon Moore, Eddie Guerrero and Kurt Angle.
El Invader#1	World Wrestling Council, International Wrestling Association	1966–2004	Puerto Rico	In 2015, he was inducted into the Salón de los Inmortales.
El Olympico	World Wide Wrestling Federation	1972–1976; 1980	Mexico	
El Samurai	All-Japan Pro Wrestling, Michinoku Pro Wrestling, New Japan Pro-Wrestling	1991–2013	Japan	
El Santo	Empresa Mexicana de Lucha Libre	1942–1982	Mexico	
El Hijo del Santo	AAA, Consejo Mundial de Lucha Libre, Universal Wrestling Association, World Wrestling Association	1982–	Mexico	
El Sicodelico	World Wrestling Association	1968–2014	Mexico	
El Solitario	Empresa Mexicana de Lucha Libre, Universal Wrestling Association	1965–1986	Mexico	He died from a heart attack during an operation.
The Executioner	World Wrestling Federation	1981-1984, 1985, 1996-1997	United States	Portrayed by Ron Shaw, Buddy Rose, and Terry Gordy.
Fishman	AAA, Empresa Mexicana de Lucha Libre, Universal Wrestling Association	1971–2000, 2004-2012	Mexico	Unmasked by Máscara Sagrada in 2000.
Golden Terror (original)	World Wide Wrestling Federation, National Wrestling Alliance, Georgia Championship Wrestling	1964-1966	United States	
Golden Terror	World Wide Wrestling Federation, NWA Hollywood Wrestling	1964, 1960s	United States	
Golden Terror	World Wide Wrestling Federation	1977-1978	United States	
Golga	World Wrestling Federation	1998–1999	United States	
The Gladiator	Championship Wrestling from Florida, Worldwide Wrestling Associates, World Wrestling Federation	1968–1988	Canada	
The Grappler	National Wrestling Alliance, Pacific Northwest Wrestling	1978–2006	United States	
The Great Sasuke	Michinoku Pro Wrestling, New Japan Pro-Wrestling, World Wrestling Federation, Extreme Championship Wrestling	1990–	Japan	
Juventud Guerrera	AAA, Extreme Championship Wrestling, World Championship Wrestling	1992–1998	Mexico	Unmasked by Chris Jericho in 1998.
Fuego Guerrero	All Japan Pro Wrestling	2002–2003	United States	
Hallowicked	CHIKARA, Ring Of Honor	2002–2021	United States	
The Handsome Stranger	Global Wrestling Federation	1991	United States	
The Hangman	Stampede Wrestling, World Wrestling Federation, National Wrestling Alliance, Lutte International	1976-1987	Canada	
Dasher Hatfield	CHIKARA	2009	United States	Also wore masks as Create-A-Wrestler, MosCOW The Communist Bovine and Ultimo Breakfast
Hayabusa	AAA, Consejo Mundial de Lucha Libre, Frontier Martial Arts Wrestling	1993–2001	Japan	
The Hood	Pacific Northwest Wrestling	1991	United States	
The Hood	World Class Championship Wrestling	1988	United States	Also used the same mask in Wild West Wrestling as "The New Spoiler".
The Hurricane	World Wrestling Entertainment	2001–2005; 2009–2019	United States	
Japanese Pool Boy	East Coast Wrestling Association, Ring of Honor	1999-2013	United States	
Jimmy Jack Funk	National Wrestling Alliance, World Class Championship Wrestling, World Wrestling Federation	1986–1991	United States	
Kalisto	Lucha Libre AAA Worldwide, World Wrestling Entertainment, Major League Wrestling	2006–present	Mexico	
Kane	World Wrestling Entertainment	1997–2003; 2011–2014; 2015–2018	United States	
Kapitan PWR	Philippine Wrestling Revolution	2016–2022	Philippines	
Kato	World Wrestling Federation	1990–1992	United States	
Kendo Nagasaki (original)	Joint Promotions, All Star Wrestling, Stampede Wrestling Pacific Northwest Wrestling, LDN Wrestling	1964–1978; 1981; 1986–1993; 2000-2001; 2007-2008	United Kingdom	Unmasked in a public ceremony on ITV's World of Sport in 1977. Was also unmasked on UK television by Billy Howes in 1971, Big Daddy in 1975, Dave Taylor and Robbie Brookside both in 1988 and Giant Haystacks in 1991.
Kendo Nagasaki (imposter)/ King Kendo (original)	Joint Promotions, All Star Wrestling, British Wrestling Federation	late 1970s-1993	United Kingdom	Renamed King Kendo after legal action from Peter Thornley. Unmasked repeatedly as Bill Clarke at 1981 All Star Wrestling house shows around the UK by the real Kendo Nagasaki. Also appeared as the Red Devil on UK television 1982, unmasked as Clarke by Big Daddy
King Kendo (replacement)	All Star Wrestling, World Association of Wrestling	1994–1996; 2012-present	United Kingdom	Replaced Bill Clarke in the role after the latter retired
Kowabunga (original)	United States Wrestling Association	1990	United States	
Kowabunga	Smokey Mountain Wrestling	1994	United States	
Kwang	World Wrestling Federation, Major League Wrestling	1994–1995, 2021-2022	Japan	
L'Ange Blanc	FFCP	1950s-1960s	France	
La Parka (original)	AAA, Consejo Mundial de Lucha Libre, World Championship Wrestling	1992–	Mexico	
La Parka (AAA)	Lucha Libre AAA Worldwide	2003–2020	Mexico	Died from injuries on January 11, 2020.
Lazer-Tron	National Wrestling Alliance	1987	United States	
Leatherface (original)	Frontier Martial-Arts Wrestling, W*ING, IWA Japan, independent circuit	1989–2010	United States	Michael Kirchner was sent to jail in 1993 and was replaced by Rick Patteron.
Leatherface (Rick Patterson)	IWA Japan, CMLL, Elite Canadian Championship Wrestling, independent circuit	1993–2013	Canada	
Le Bourreau de Béthune	FFCP	1950s-1960s	France	
Leon	Arsion, JWP Joshi Puroresu, Pure-J	2000-	Japan	
Jushin Thunder Liger	New Japan Pro-Wrestling	1989–2020	Japan	
Lizmark	Lucha Libre AAA Worldwide, Empresa Mexicana de Lucha Libre	1978–2013	Mexico	
Lizmark, Jr.	Consejo Mundial de Lucha Libre, International Wrestling Revolution Group, Lucha Libre USA	1991–2007	Mexico	Unmasked by Blue Panther in 2007.
Lord Humongous	American Wrestling Association, Continental Wrestling Association, National Wrestling Alliance, United States Wrestling Association	1984–1990s	United States	Portrayed by Mike Stark, Jeff Van Kamp, Gary Nations, Sid Eudy, Barry Buchanan, Randy Lewis, and Emory Hale.
Mankind	World Wrestling Federation	1996–1999, 2005	United States	
The Masked Avenger	World Class Championship Wrestling	1983	United States	Unmasked after defeating Gorgeous Jimmy Garvin in 1983.
The Masked Canadian	National Wrestling Alliance	1975	United States	
The Masked Crusader	Maple Leaf Wrestling	1973	Canada	The Masked Crusader was unmasked by The Sheik in 1973. He continued wrestling under a mask as one-half of The Crusaders with Crusader#2 until again being unmasked by The Sheik a year later.
The Masked Destroyer	Championship Wrestling from Florida	1975	Canada	
The Masked Marvel (original)	National Wrestling Association	1915–1916	United States	Earliest-known masked matman in the US, he was eventually unmasked as Mort Henderson by Joe Stecher in 1916.
The Masked Marvel	National Wrestling Alliance	1951–1953	United States	Unmasked by Lou Thesz in 1953.
The Masked Superstar	Georgia Championship Wrestling, World Wrestling Federation, Lutte International, Jim Crockett Promotions, Independent circuit	1976–1986; 1998–2017	United States	
The Masked Superstar II	Jim Crockett Promotions	1978–1980	United States	Unmasked by Blackjack Mulligan in 1980.
The Masked Terror	American Wrestling Association	1963–1964	United States	Unmasked by Lou Thesz in 1963 and Dick the Bruiser in 1964.
The Masked Tornado	Bronco Universal Promotions, International Wrestling Federation	1983–1990	South Africa	
Master of Pain	United States Wrestling Association	1989	United States	
Matanza Cueto	Lucha Underground	2015-2018	United States	
Max Moon (original)	World Wrestling Federation	1992	United States	Was fired by WWF, and replaced by Paul Diamond.
Max Moon	World Wrestling Federation, New Japan Pro Wrestling	1992–1993, 1994	United States	
Mayhem Brannigan	Philippine Wrestling Revolution	2014–2016	Philippines	
Mercurio	EPW American Wrestling	2015–2017	United Kingdom	
Midnight Rider	Championship Wrestling from Florida	1983–1984	United States	
Mil Máscaras	All Japan Pro Wrestling, National Wrestling Alliance, World Championship Wrestling, World Wrestling Association, World Wrestling Federation	1965–2019	Mexico	First masked wrestler to compete at Madison Square Garden.
Místico	New Japan Pro-Wrestling, World Wrestling Entertainment, Lucha Libre AAA Worldwide, Lucha Underground, All Elite Wrestling, Major League Wrestling	1998-present	Mexico	
Mr. Águila	World Wrestling Federation	1997–1998	Mexico	
Mr. America	World Wrestling Entertainment	2003	United States	
Mr. JL	World Championship Wrestling	1995–1997	United States	
Mr. M	American Wrestling Association	1962, 1970	United States	
Mr. Olympia	National Wrestling Alliance	1982–1984	United States	Unmasked by former tag team partner Super Olympia in 1984.
Mr. R	National Wrestling Alliance	1984	United States	
Mr. Wrestling	All-Japan Pro Wrestling Championship Wrestling from Florida, National Wrestling Alliance	1965–1983; 1986–1987	United States	
Mr. Wrestling II	National Wrestling Alliance	1973–2007	United States	
Mr. X	World Wrestling Federation	1984–1986	United States	
Mortis	World Championship Wrestling, World Wrestling Entertainment	1995–1997, 2003	United States	Wrestled with the gimmick in dark Matches and house shows for WWE in 2003.
Night Hawk (Original)	World Wide Wrestling Federation	1970–1971	United States	Portrayed by Charlie "Man" Lassiter Jr. of Walton County, Florida. He unmasked himself when his wife Joy became ill, she died a year later.
The Nighthawk	National Wrestling Alliance, Wrestling Superstars Live	1990–2006	United States	
Ophidian	Chikara	2007–2020	United States	
Oz	World Championship Wrestling	1991	United States	
The Patriot	All Japan Pro Wrestling, Global Wrestling Federation, World Championship Wrestling, World Wrestling Federation, World Wrestling Council	1991–1997	United States	
The Patriot	Independent circuit	2002–	United States	
The Pegasus Kid	New Japan Pro-Wrestling	1989–1991	Canada	After losing his mask to Jushin Thunder Liger in 1991, Benoit continued competing as the masked wrestler "Wild Pegasus" until 1995.
Pentagón Jr.	Lucha Libre AAA Worldwide, Lucha Underground, Major League Wrestling, TNA, Consejo Mundial de Lucha Libre, World Wrestling Entertainment,	2007-present	Mexico	
Pierroth Jr.	AAA, Consejo Mundial de Lucha Libre, International Wrestling Revolution Group, World Wrestling Council, World Wrestling Federation	1989–1998	Mexico	Unmasked by La Parka in 1998.
The Pink Assassin	Century Wrestling Alliance, International Championship Wrestling, Millennium Wrestling Federation, Power League Wrestling	1989–2001	United States	
The Predator	World Wrestling Federation	1993	United States	
The Pro	World Championship Wrestling	1989	United States	
The Professional	National Wrestling Alliance	1968–1972	United States	
The Masked Russian (Joe Celli)	East Coast Wrestling Association	1982–1984		
Psicosis	Consejo Mundial de Lucha Libre, Extreme Championship Wrestling, World Championship Wrestling	1989–1998	Mexico	
The Punisher	USWA Texas	1989	United States	
Quatro	Philippine Wrestling Revolution	2017–2018	Philippines	Currently in Filipino Pro Wrestling as an unmasked wrestler.
Ray	Smash, Wrestling New Classic, Frontier Martial-Arts Wrestling	2003-2018	Hong Kong; Japan	Died on August 30, 2018, from a brain tumor.
Rayo de Jalisco, Jr.'	Consejo Mundial de Lucha Libre, World Wrestling Association	1975–	Mexico	
Red River Jack	World Class Championship Wrestling	1987	United States	
Repo Man	World Wrestling Federation	1991–1993, 2001, 2007	United States	
Rey Celestial	Lucha Libre AAA Worldwide, various Mexican promotions	2010-2017	Mexico	Killed in a hit and run car accident
Rey Mysterio, Jr.	Lucha Libre AAA Worldwide, Extreme Championship Wrestling, World Championship Wrestling, World Wrestling Entertainment	1989–1999; 2002–	Mexico	Unmasked in 1999.
Rock 'n' Roll Phantom	United States Wrestling Association	1993	United States	
SANDATA	Philippine Wrestling Revolution	2015–2022	Philippines	
Scorpio Sky	Independent wrestling, Pro Wrestling Guerrilla	2002–2005	United States	
The Shadow	World Wide Wrestling Federation	1963	United States	
Shark Boy	Total Nonstop Action Wrestling	1997–	United States	
Shinobi	World Wrestling Federation, Smokey Mountain Wrestling, Independent circuit	1993-1994, 1996, 2004	United States	He was known as the Five Star Ninja on April 12, 2004, episode of Monday Night Raw.
The Shockmaster	World Championship Wrestling	1993-1994	United States	Later known as the Super Shockmaster.
The Silent Warrior	Independent circuit	2010	United States	Better known deaf masked wrestler in the US and Japan.
Silver King	World Championship Wrestling, various promotions in Mexico.	1985-2019	Mexico	Died in the ring on May 11, 2019.
Sin Cara	World Wrestling Entertainment	2011–2019	Mexico	Originally portrayed by Luis Ignacio Urive Alvirde and later by Jorge Arriaga.
Sin Cara Negro	World Wrestling Entertainment	2011	Mexico	An evil, black-clad doppelganger of the original Sin Cara; portrayed by Jorge Arriaga, who would later go on to take over the role of the original Sin Cara character.
Spider Lady	World Wrestling Federation	1985	United States	
The Spoiler	National Wrestling Alliance, World Class Championship Wrestling, World Wide Wrestling Federation	1967–1994	United States	
The Spoiler	Joint Promotions	1987	United Kingdom	Managed by Doctor Monika Kaiser from Germany. Unmasked twice on TV in 1987 by Big Daddy, positively identified as Drew McDonald the second time.
Stagger Lee (original)	Mid-South Wrestling	1982	United States	
Stagger Lee	Mid-South Wrestling	1982	United States	
Star Blazer	World Championship Wrestling	1990	United States	
Starlight Kid	World Wonder Ring Stardom	2015-	Japan	
The Student	National Wrestling Alliance	1962–1967	United States	
Suicide	Total Nonstop Action Wrestling	2008–	United States Philippines Japan	Portrayed by Frankie Kazarian, Christopher Daniels, Akira Kawabata, T. J. Perkins, Austin Aries and Jonathan Gresham.
The Sultan	World Wrestling Federation	1996–1998	United States	
Super Delfin	Consejo Mundial de Lucha Libre, Michinoku Pro Wrestling	1989–	Japan	
Super Destroyer	Jim Crockett Promotions	1973–1975	United States	
Super Hentai	Combat Zone Wrestling	1998–	Japan	
Super Invader	World Championship Wrestling	1992	United States	
Super Olympia	NWA Southeast	1984	United States	Unmasked by former tag team partner Mr. Olympia in 1984.
Super Parka	AAA, Consejo Mundial de Lucha Libre, International Wrestling Revolution Group, World Wrestling Association	1976–	Mexico	Unmasked by El Hijo del Santo in 2003.
Super Shocker	Consejo Mundial de Lucha Libre	1992–1999	Mexico	
Sweet Brown Sugar	Championship Wrestling from Florida, National Wrestling Association	1979–1984	United States	
Sweet Ebony Diamond	Jim Crockett Promotions, Maple Leaf Wrestling	1980-1981	Canada	
Tank	World Wrestling Federation, United States Wrestling Association	1997	United States	Member of The Truth Commission.
The Terrorist	American Wrestling Association	1985	United States	
Texas Red	World Class Championship Wrestling	1984–1988	United States	
The Undertaker	World Wrestling Federation	1995–1996	United States	Wore the "Phantom" mask after he broke his oribtal bone.
Tiger Mask I	New Japan Pro-Wrestling	1981–1984	Japan	
Tiger Mask II	All-Japan Pro Wrestling	1985–1990	Japan	
Tiger Mask III	All-Japan Pro Wrestling	1990–1994	Japan	
Tiger Mask IV	New Japan Pro-Wrestling	1995–	Japan	
Tinieblas	World Wrestling Association	1971–2019	Mexico	
Thunder	Consejo Mundial de Lucha Libre	2007– 2016	Australia	Died from stomach cancer on June 30, 2016
Último Dragón	Consejo Mundial de Lucha Libre, Michinoku Pro Wrestling, New Japan Pro-Wrestling, WAR, World Championship Wrestling	1991–	Japan	
UltraMantis Black	CHIKARA	2002–2023	United States	
Virus	Consejo Mundial de Lucha Libre, Universal Wrestling Association	1998–	Mexico	
War Machine	Jim Crockett Promotions	1987	United States	
White Venus	World Wide Wrestling Federation	1971–1972	Mexico	
Who?	World Wrestling Federation	1996	United States	
Wrath	World Championship Wrestling	1997–1998	United States	
The Masked X	Total Nonstop Action Wrestling	2003	Canada	
Yeti	World Championship Wrestling	1995-1996	United States	Subsequently, wrestled under the name "The Super Giant Ninja".
The Yellow Dog	World Championship Wrestling	1990	United States	
Zan Panzer	Jim Crockett Promotions	1990	United States	
Zebra Kid	National Wrestling Alliance	1950s	United States	

=== Tag teams and stables ===
Name	Promotion	Years active	Country	Notes
American Starship (Starship Coyote & Starship Eagle)	Jim Crockett Promotions	1985	United States	
The A-Team (The "Atomic Kid" Buddy Wayne and the Frog)	All Star Wrestling	1987–1988	Canada	The Atomic Kid decided to start wrestling without his mask revealing himself to be Buddy Wayne not long after forming the A-Team in 1987. The Frog was unmasked by "Vicious" Verne Siebert, The Mighty I-Ton, and "Tiger" Dory Signh in 1988.
The Assassins (original) (Assassin#1 & Assassin #2)	Florida Championship Wrestling, Georgia Championship Wrestling, National Wrestling Alliance	1961–1983	United States	Roger Smith, Randy Colley and Hercules Hernandez each wrestled as "Assassin #2".
The Assassins (Assassin#1 and Assassin #2)	World Wrestling Association	1966–1967	United States	Assassin #1 was unmasked by The Sheik in 1971.
The Blackhearts (Destruction and Apocalypse)	All-Japan Pro Wrestling, IWA Japan, Stampede Wrestling	1989–1991; 1993, 1996–1997	United States	A second incarnation was formed with Apocalypse and Devastation in 1993; Apocalypse was replaced by Agony in 1996.
The Blue Infernos (Blue Inferno I & Blue Inferno II)	Continental Wrestling Association	1966–1967	United States	
The Colossal Kongs (Awesome Kong and Krusher Kong)	Global Wrestling Federation, United States Wrestling Association, World Championship Wrestling	1991–1993	United States	
The Columbian Tigers (Columbian Tiger I & Columbian Tiger II)	National Wrestling Alliance	1974	United States	
Los Conquistadores (original) (Conquistador I & Conquistador II)	World Wrestling Federation	1987–1989	United States	
Los Conquistadores (Conquistador I & Conquistador II)	World Wrestling Federation	2000	United States	
Los Conquistadores (Conquistador I & Conquistador II)	World Wrestling Federation	2000	United States	
Los Conquistadores (Conquistador I & Conquistador II)	World Wrestling Federation	2003	United States	
The Council of Trabajadores	Philippine Wrestling Revolution	2015–	Philippines	
The Cruel Connection (Cruel Connection I & Cruel Connection II)	Jim Crockett Promotions	1987	United States	
The Crusaders (Crusader I & Crusader II)	Maple Leaf Wrestling	1973–1974	Canada	Crusader I was unmasked by The Sheik in 1974.
The Cyberpunks (Ice & Fire)	United States Wrestling Association	1996	United States	
The Ding Dongs (Ding Dong I & Ding Dong II)	World Championship Wrestling	1989	United States	Unmasked by The Skyscrapers in 1989.
Doom (Ron Simmons and Butch Reed)	World Championship Wrestling	1989–1990	United States	
The Executioners (original) (Executioner#1 and Executioner#2, and Executioner#3)	World Wide Wrestling Federation	1976-1977	United States	
The Executioners (Pain and Agony)	World Wrestling Federation	1992–1994	United States	
The Grapplers (Grappler#1 and Grappler#2)	Continental Wrestling Association	1982–1984	United States	
The Infernos (original) (Mephisto & Dante)	Jim Crockett Promotions, National Wrestling Alliance	1966–1972	United States	
The Interns (Central States) (Tom Andrews & Jim Starr)	Continental Wrestling Association	1971–1975	United States	Andrews returned to the territory a year later wrestling under the name "Super Intern".
The Interns (Kenneth & John Moore)	Continental Wrestling Association	1976–1977	United States	
The Interns (Memphis) (Roger Smith & Don Bass)	Continental Wrestling Association	1984–1985	United States	
The Machines (Super Machine, Big Machine, Giant Machine, Hulk Machine)	World Wrestling Federation	1986–1987	United States	
The Invaders (Invader I, II, III, IV)	World Wrestling Council	1973–2012	Puerto Rico	
Jynx Brothers (Ingus Jynx, Wildo Jynx)	World Wrestling Federation	1996	United States	
The Knights (The Red Knight, The Blue Knight and The Black Knight)	World Wrestling Federation	1993	United States	
Los Villanos (Villano I, II, III, IV, V)	AAA, Consejo Mundial de Lucha Libre, Universal Wrestling Association, World Championship Wrestling	1970–	Mexico	Villano II committed suicide on April 17, 1989. Villano III was unmasked by Atlantis in 2000.
The Masked Marvels (Billy Garrett & Jim Starr)	Mid-Atlantic Championship Wrestling	1971	United States	
The Masked Marauders (Scrubber Daly & Lucky Gordon)	Joint Promotions	1983	United Kingdom	Gordon was later replaced by Larry "Black Jack Mulligan" Coulter for some later 1983 house shows. The originals Daly & Gordon teamed as the Marauders without masks 1985
The Masked Superstars (Karl Von Steiger & Don Greene)	Florida Championship Wrestling	1974–1975	United States	
The Medics (El Medicos); Medico I & Medico II	Continental Wrestling Association	1972	United States	
Minnesota Wrecking Crew II (Mike Enos & Wayne Bloom)	World Championship Wrestling	1990	United States	
Mr. X #1 & Mr. X #2	Jim Crockett Promotions	1976–1977	United States	Unmasked by Mid-Atlantic Tag Team Champions Paul Jones and Ricky Steamboat in 1977.
The Robotrons (Craig Bresett and Fabio Chiesa)	All Star Wrestling	1987	Canada	
The Russian Assassins (Russian Assassin#1 and Russian Assassin#2)	Jim Crockett Promotions	1988–1989	United States	
The Shadows (Shadow I and Shadow II)	World Wrestling Federation	1987	United States	
The Super Assassins (Super Assassin#1 & Super Assassin#2)	World Championship Wrestling	1995–1996	United States	
The Super Destroyers (original) (Super Destroyer I and Super Destroyer II)	World Class Championship Wrestling	1983–1984	United States	
The Super Destroyers (Super Destroyer I and Super Destroyer II)	Eastern Championship Wrestling	1992–1993	United States	
Super Zodiac #1 & Super Zodiac#2	World Class Championship Wrestling	1989	United States	
Tex Slazenger and Shanghai Pearce	World Championship Wrestling	1992–1994	United States	
