= Martin Casaus =

American professional wrestler (born 1985)

Personal information
- Born: March 5, 1985 (age 41) West Jordan, Utah
- Spouse: Leslie Dean Casaus (m. 2021)

Professional wrestling career
- Ring name(s): Magnificent Martin; Martin Casaus; Marty Casaus; Marty Martinez; Tristan Gallo
- Billed height: 6 ft 1 in (1.85 m)
- Billed weight: 245 lb (111 kg; 17.5 st)
- Billed from: La Jolla, California; Salt Lake City, Utah
- Trained by: Derrick Hubbard; Steve Nielsen; Tom Howard
- Debut: 2003

Martin Casaus (born March 5, 1985) is an American entrepreneur, content creator, and professional wrestler. Casaus is most known for his work in El Rey Network series Lucha Underground under the ring name of Marty "The Moth" Martinez, where he is a former Lucha Underground Champion.

== Personal life ==
Martin was born March 5, 1985, to Francis and Cheryl Casaus in West Jordan, Utah. Casaus was a four sport student athlete in high school and turned down college scholarships in lacrosse and football to pursue his academic studies. His parents put in overtime at their jobs so they could enroll Casaus in private schools until college. Casaus was the first in his family to graduate college. He received a bachelor's degree in Business Administration with a 3.98 GPA. Casaus has one brother who is currently in the United States Navy. Casaus holds a series 7 and 63 financial professional licenses. Martin married Leslie Dean on June 9, 2021.

Martin credits his success in life to his mentors, Pete Gallegos and Andrew Lucero. Without their continued guidance and direction, Martin admits his successes would not be so measurable.

== Career ==
=== Early career ===
Casaus first started training to become a wrestler in 2003 at the Utah-based Ultra Championship Wrestling-Zero (UCW). He was primarily trained by Derrick Jannetty. Adopting the ring name "Tristan Gallo", he was placed in Stevie Slick's faction, "The Dynasty", as an arrogant heel and crony to Slick. During his time in the promotion, he won the UCW-Zero Heavyweight Championship 6 times, the UCW-Zero Tag Team Championship 5 times and the UCW-Zero Ultra-X Championship 1 time.

In the early 2000s Casaus began working in the independent wrestling scene. He wrestled as Tristan Gallo in many promotions across the country, especially in the mid west. He later changed his name to reflect his real name after WWE Tough Enough used it during the show

=== World Wrestling Entertainment/WWE (2007, 2011) ===
Casaus had his first WWE tryout at the FCW training center in 2007. Casaus was announced as a competitor on the revival of WWE Tough Enough season five which began airing on April 4, 2011. The competition consisted of in and out of ring training, along with challenges in and out of the ring.

On the seventh episode ("Running With Wolves"), Casaus had a freak accident that sent him to the emergency room. He later returned to the training center on crutches with his title belt around his waist, revealing to Tough Enough host Stone Cold Steve Austin that he was forced to leave the competition after doctors would not allow him to continue. Casaus was the only contestant that got to hang his belt up, as well as the only competitor to never be in the "Bottom Three".

=== Lucha Underground (2014–2018) ===
In September 2014, Casaus confirmed he signed with El Rey Network's new show Lucha Underground, that began airing on October 29. He worked the tapings under the ring name "Magnificent Martin". He also worked as Marty the Magician, with Beautiful Brenda as his assistant. However, both suffered an injury and their characters were dropped. Casaus debuted on (aired April 29, 2015) as Marty "The Moth" Martinez, a fan who interfered in the match between Cage, King Cuerno and Hernandez. On February 22, 2015, Martinez had his first aired match, where he was defeated by Prince Puma. July 15, Marty demanded and lost a match against Sexy Star for one of the seven ancient Aztec medallions which she had won only moments before, due to the fact the insignia on the medallion was of a moth; confirming his claims of having "Aztec blood". His character then was tweaked to be mentally unhinged after he kidnapped Sexy Star and likely tortured her along with his storyline sister Mariposa for the duration of Lucha Underground’s hiatus in the summer. In Season 3, his character developed an obsession with ring announcer Melissa Santos, which led to a rivalry with Fénix, who was having a storyline relationship with Melissa. The rivalry culminated in a Luchas de Apuestas match at Ultima Lucha Tres with Fénix putting up his mask against Marty's hair. During the match, Marty used Mariposa (who had accompanied him) as a human shield and deliberately pulled her into the path of a dive by Fénix, causing her to turn on him and be instrumental in his losing the match, after which his head was shaved by Fénix and Melissa. In season 4 he was the last man eliminated in Aztec Warfare 4, losing to Pentagón Dark. During season 4, Martinez defeated Dragon Azteca Jr. to win the Gift of the Gods Championship. That same night, he cashed the title for an opportunity for Pentagón Dark's Lucha Underground Championship, which he won. During his reign, he defeated Mariposa and aligned with Reklusa, but lost the title against Pentagón Dark at Ultima Lucha Cuatro in a Cero Miedo match.

=== Lucha Libre AAA Worldwide (2016) ===
In 2016, Casaus had his first match in Mexico as part of a Lucha Underground match at Triplemania 24. The match featured Prince Puma, Rey Mysterio, and Dragon Azteca Jr. vs Marty the Moth Martinez, Mil Muertes, and Matanza. Martin continued his career in AAA working storylines with La Parka, Los Psycho Circus, Blue Demon, Ricky Banderas, John Morrison, Hernandez, El Hijo del Fantasma, and El Texano Jr.

=== All Elite Wrestling (2021) ===
Casaus made his debut for All Elite Wrestling on the April 28th edition of Dark, facing Brian Cage in a losing effort. Casaus would then appear again on the May 11th edition of Dark, losing to Jungle Boy. He went on in AEW having matches with Matt Sydal and his Ring of Honor debut against Angélico

== Acting career ==
In 2004 Casaus had his first taste of the entertainment business when he appeared on the TV show Everwood to play an uncredited featured folk style wrestler. He immediately began acting training.

=== Filmography ===
==== Television ====
Year	Title	Role	Notes
2004	Everwood	"Evil Wrestler"	Uncredited; Season 2 Episode 12
2007–2011	NWA Showcase	Tristan Gallo	
2011	WWE Tough Enough	Himself	
2013	Barter Kings	Trader	
2014–2018	Lucha Underground	Marty "the Moth" Martinez	

==== Film ====
Year	Title	Role	Notes
2012	Vampired	Bully	
2017	Sandy Wexler	Night Night wrestler	

== Championships and accomplishments ==
- American Championship Wrestling
  - ACW Midwest Championship (1 time)
  - ACW Match of the Year 2005
- Asylum Championship Wrestling
  - ACW Tag Team Championship (1 time) – with Josh Evans
  - ACW Championship (1 time)
- Fusion Pro Wrestling
  - Western States Cup (1 time) – with Dallas Murdock
- Future Stars of Wrestling
  - FSW Tag Team Championship (1 time) – with Sam Udell, Troy McClain and Tyler Cintron
- Lucha Libre & Laughs
  - LLL Championship (1 time)
- Lucha Underground
  - Lucha Underground Gift of the Gods Championship (1 time)
  - Lucha Underground Championship (1 time)
- Pro Wrestling Blitz
  - FITE TV Championship (1 time)
- Rocky Mountain Pro
  - Twitch Champion (2 Times)
- Ultra Championship Wrestling-Zero
  - UCW-Zero Heavyweight Championship (6 times)
  - UCW-Zero Tag Team Championship (5 times) – with Justin Wilde (1), G.Q. Gallo (1), Devan Payne (1) and Derrick Jannetty (2)
  - UCW-Zero Ultra-X Championship (1 time)

=== Luchas de Apuestas record ===
Winner (wager)	Loser (wager)	Location	Event	Date	Notes
Fénix (mask)	Marty Martinez (hair)	Boyle Heights, California	Ultima Lucha Tres	June 25, 2016	
