= Ultra Championship Wrestling-Zero =

Wrestling promotion

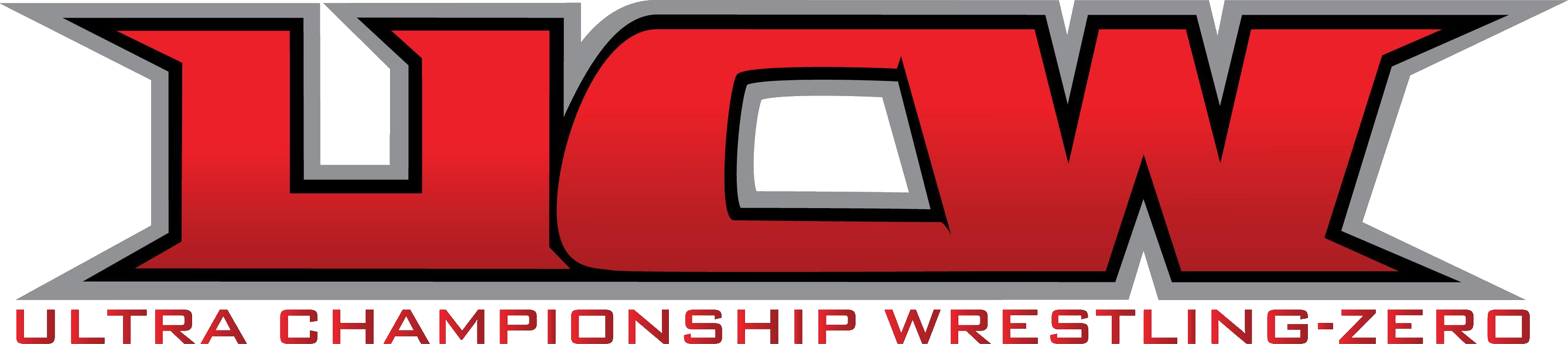
- Acronym: UCW-Zero
- Founded: 2002
- Style: American Wrestling
- Headquarters: Salt Lake City, Utah, United States
- Founder: Steve Neilson
- Owner: Steve Neilson (2002-)
- Parent: United Wrestling Network (2013-); National Wrestling Alliance (2007-2012); AWA Superstars (2005-2007)
- Sister: NWA Pro
- Formerly: American Professional Wrestling (2002)
- Website: Official website

Ultra Championship Wrestling-Zero (UCW-Zero, formerly known as American Professional Wrestling) is an American independent professional wrestling promotion based in Salt Lake City, Utah. Founded by promoter Steve Neilson in 2002, it is a Utah-based wrestling promotion that promotes events in the Rocky Mountains and Southwestern United States. One of its shows at the 2008 Festival Latinoamericano in Provo, Utah set an attendance record with over 1,000 people present at opening night.

It was affiliated with AWA Superstars from 2005 to 2007, and was also a member of the National Wrestling Alliance from May 2007-September 2012, co-promoting events with NWA Pro. A number of independent wrestlers spent their early careers in the promotion, most notably, Blitz, who was established as the first UCW-Zero Heavyweight Champion, Derrick Jannetty, Los Mochis' Paco, and Tristan Gallo who was the promotion's first UCW-Zero Ultra-X Champion; in 2011, Gallo was a participant in WWE Tough Enough. UCW-Zero has also featured former wrestlers from Extreme Championship Wrestling, Total Non-Stop Action Wrestling, and World Wrestling Entertainment.

== History ==
=== Formation ===
UCW-Zero was founded by Salt Lake City native Steve Neilson in early 2002. It was originally known as American Professional Wrestling until January 2003 when it was changed to Ultra Championship Wrestling Zero. According to Neilson, he decided to start a local professional wrestling promotion to discourage his sons and their friends from participating in backyard wrestling. He initially built a basement wrestling ring at his home where they could train safely. Later, he purchased a used boxing ring and started to offer consistent professional wrestling training to hopeful future grapplers. One of the wrestlers, Los Mochi Paco, developed a website for their backyard wrestling as a high school project. As Paco described, "other promoters started noticing the Website and the wrestling ring and began to contact us. From there, we started training to be pro wrestlers and started doing shows". Los Mochi Paco, Derrick Jannetty, and Blitz were among the first batch of young wrestlers to develop their basic skills under the tutelage of experienced female wrestler Morgan and promoter Steven Neilson. Neilson promoted the first UCW-ZERO show, under the banner of American Professional Wrestling, in May 2002 at a local high school after forcefully pushing out previous partners, Early APW/UCW Zero events featured the high flying tag team known as Los Mochis, the athletic standout Blitz, and an arrogant loud mouthed wrestler known as Derrick Jannetty. Steven Neilson himself would appear as "Stevie Slick" whose in-ring persona is modeled after World Wrestling Entertainment's "Mr. McMahon".

=== Centro Civico (2003-2004) ===
Throughout 2003 and 2004 UCW-ZERO found a consistent venue at Centro Civico Mexicano in Salt Lake City. During this time period, UCW-ZERO experienced significant growth in fan attendance, developing a strong following from local wrestling fans. Notable UCW-ZERO events took place in early February at Centro Civico (the first Mochi-Palooza) and in March at Northridge High School. At the event at Northridge High, Blitz captured the UCW Zero championship by defeating Validus in front of a hometown crowd. UCW-Zero events in 2003 were often headlined by Blitz or a popular tag team known as the Los Mochis. The Mochis, consisting of members Paco and Damien, faced off against a bundle of tag team combinations from both Utah and Colorado en route to claiming and defending the UCW Zero tag team titles. Another semi-regular venue was St. Joseph's Church in West Jordan, Utah in 2005.

During this period, the UCW training school continued to grow and develop, producing an influx of new talent such as Martin Casaus, Kahn Kushion, and Tyson Ferrari. These new faces joined an already impressive crew of ambitious and hungry grapplers to produce exciting wrestling events in the region. Moreover, UCW-ZERO started to incorporate reputable outside talent from Total Non-Stop Action and other promotions to enhance the wrestling events. Seasoned wrestling veteran David Young appeared on two UCW wrestling events in 2003 tag teaming with Blitz to take on Derrick Jannetty with partners Charles Shipwright and former WCW wrestler Elix Skipper. In early 2004, UCW Zero standout Blitz faced the biggest challenge of his young career when he squared off against multiple time TNA champion "The Phenomenal" AJ Styles. Though he put up a valiant effort, Blitz was defeated by Styles.

The Ultra X championship belt was added to the UCW title fold in the early spring of 2004. Martin Casaus (then known as Tristan Gallo) became the first Ultra X champion by defeating GQ X, Derrick Jannetty, and Paco in a double elimination fatal four-way match. In the summer of 2004, UCW was a main attraction in a large festival in West Jordan. While the festival included a plethora of events, the UCW wrestling was a hands down favorite among the many festival attendees. UCW concluded a successful 2004 with the third annual Season Beatings event. At the event, a returning Derrick Jannetty defeated Los Mochi Damien to claim his first UCW title. In the main event, Blitz avenged his earlier loss by defeating AJ Styles in a re-match to their first encounter held at the beginning of the year.

Utah, like most of the Rocky Mountains and Southwestern United States, is rarely visited by mainstream wrestling promotions such as Total Nonstop Action Wrestling and World Wrestling Entertainment. Within five years, UCW-Zero was able to build a strong following in the region and eventually expanded into Arizona, Colorado and California as well holding shows as far as Chicago and West Virginia. One show in Pocatello, Idaho drew a crowd of over 6,000. In a later interview, Neilson credited his wrestlers for the promotions success, "I would say the wrestlers we have are perfectionists. They train hard. They train every single week. They're in the gym, in the wrestling ring, and working continuously to perfect their craft."

=== Fight Coliseum (2005-2007) ===
At the onset of 2005, UCW Zero became a member of AWA Superstars. In the summer of that year, the promotion found a new home at a local arena known appropriately as the Fight Coliseum. In one of the first major shows promoted at the coliseum, ECW alumni Sabu and the Public Enemy entered the UCW ring to take on Derrick Jannetty, Paco, and Kahn Kussion. After a wild and brutal affair, the Public Enemy and Sabu emerged victorious. A few months later, WCW, WWE, and TNA competitor Shannon Moore teamed with Derrick Jannetty to face off against “Utah’s most popular tag team” the Los Mochis Paco and Damien.

In 2006, the UCW locker room continued to grow with fresh faces Dallas Murdock, Cassidy, Guerrero Azteca, Radical Ricky, Kid Kade, and Devan Payne entering the ranks. At the start of 2006, the UCW Zero title was held by JMB. In May, JMB lost the title to Derrick Jannetty. Jannetty's second title run was short-lived, and within two months he lost the title to Martin Casaus. Also in the summer of 2006, UCW co-promoted an event in association with the Utah Cancer Foundation. At the event, Los Mochi Paco and Guerrero Azteca teamed with Konnan to face the heel faction of Blitz and JMB.

2007 was a record setting year for UCW with consistent fan attendance of 300-500 fans. In January 2007, UCW-Zero held a major event at Salt Lake City's Fight Coliseum which featured a championship tournament where Los Mochi Paco, Jeff Orcut, “Mr. Spectacular” Devan Payne, and masked wrestler Kid Kade fought for the Ultra-X Championship. In the finals, Kid Kade defeated Payne to win the title. Another standout match included a hardcore-style "table match" between "fan favorites" Guerrero Azteca and Khan Kussion. The main event saw UCW-Zero Heavyweight Champion Tristan Gallo (Martin Casaus) successfully defend his title against David Young. UCW Zero received a visit from esteemed wrestling legend Marty Jannetty in the spring of 2008. Jannetty teamed with High Risk (Derrick Jannetty and Radical Ricky) against the team of Validus and Total Control (Martin Casaus and Devan Payne). Casaus and Payne would later sever their partnership and collide in a series of matches with the UCW title on the line. That summer, UCW-Zero was profiled by the Salt Lake City Weekly.

UCW ZERO reached another milestone in 2007 by wrestling in front of 6,000 fans in Pocatello, Idaho at Idaho State University. In November of that year, the first Incarceration event was held. In this event, all of the matches took place inside of a steel cage. David Young returned to UCW-ZERO for this event to team up with Paco against the unruly tag team of Dallas Murdoch and Cassidy. The evening of blood and carnage was capstoned by an especially brutal match up between former partners Derrick Jannetty and Radical Ricky. UCW-Zero held its year end supercard, Season's Beatings, in Salt Lake City on December 7, 2007. Steve Neilson, then in a kayfabe feud with newly appointed commissioner Stan the Man, was forced to participate in the battle royal opening the show. In the main event, Jeff Orcut pinned UCW-Zero Ultra-X Champion Cassidy to regain the title for the second time.

=== Association with the NWA (2007-2008) ===
In 2007, the promotion also left AWA Superstars to join the National Wrestling Alliance and began co-promoting shows with NWA Pro. By 2008, UCW-Zero was an official affiliate of the National Wrestling Alliance. UCW ZERO held bi-weekly events at St. Joseph's Church Rec Center during the summer of 2008. One of these events was headlined by a match up pitting former WWE tag team champion Rob Conway against Martin Casaus (then known as Tristan Gallo). Casaus, then holding the UCW Championship, continued to defend the belt against a number of worthy challengers from across the United States during the summer and fall of that year. Also during the summer, UCW originals Paco and Blitz formed a tag team to take on challengers from Fusion Pro Wrestling in Denver, Colorado. In late August, UCW-Zero held three events at the Festival Latinoamericano in Provo, Utah. On the first night, the show was attended by over 1,000 people, the largest opening night crowd in its history.

UCW Zero wrestlers continued to display impressive performances in outside promotions during 2008. Martin Casaus, Cassidy, Kahn Kussion, Dallas Murdoch, and Derrick Jannetty all made appearances for the NWA during the NWA TV tapings in Las Vegas and later in Hollywood. During one of these tapings, Cassidy competed against current World Champion Daniel Bryan. Martin Casaus was a routine competitor on the NWA television show, taking on Lance Cade and Trevor Murdoch, Kahn Kussion, and TJ Perkins.

In July 2009, UCW-Zero held an event at the South Valley Boys & Girls Club in Murray, Utah. The event was included in a feature story by the Provo Daily Herald of UCW-Zero wrestler Derrick Jannetty and the promotion.

=== UCW Training Center (2010–2020) ===
In early 2010, UCW ZERO expanded by opening the new "UCW Training Center". The center will be used to train future UCW stars and hold regular shows twice a month. UCW ZERO management responsibilities were divided between four directors: long time figurehead of UCW Steve Neilson, Blitz and Paco (UCW stars from the promotions inception), and current star Martin Casaus. At the beginning of this era, after eluding him for the duration of his tenure in the promotion, long-time UCW ZERO competitor Los Mochi Paco finally won the UCW Zero Heavyweight Title in May 2010 at 'Rise to the Top'. For the rest of 2010 and into 2011, Paco took on any and all worthy challengers including Kid Kade, Jr. X, and new star Tyler Cintron. After a grueling triple threat TLC match against Tyler Cintron and Jr. X and a post match beatdown by Zack James, Paco was unable to continue to compete and hence was forced to forfeit the UCW-ZERO heavyweight championship in May 2011. In a gauntlet match to decide a new UCW Champion, Jr. X outlasted five UCW competitors and was awarded the title.

2011 saw the UCW-Zero brand grow with Tristan Gallo (Martin Casaus) getting the opportunity to appear on the WWE's revival of 'Tough Enough'. After a very impressive showing, Martin's dream of winning a contract with WWE was eliminated after he fractured his ankle and was forced to leave the competition. In Casaus' absence, the brash and arrogant Tyler Cintron continued to call out and insult Casaus. Cintron even coaxed Casaus' fellow Tough Enough contestant Matt Cross into a match. After recovering from his injury, Casaus returned to the UCW ring in the summer of 2011 and competed in a series of grudge matches against Cintron. Their feud was finally put to rest in November at the third Incarceration event when Casaus pinned Cintron and scored the victory.

=== Ten-year anniversary (2012) ===
2012 marked the tenth year of production for the UCW ZERO company. At the first show of the new year on January 14, 2012, was the return of former five-time UCW ZERO Heavyweight Champion Blitz to the UCW ZERO ring as a regular member of the roster. On March 31, 2012, UCW ZERO held a show involving Martin Casaus, who faced his rival Luke Robinson. Blitz faced Los Mochis Paco in a career vs career match where the loser would be forced to retire. Paco defeated Blitz.

=== Coronavirus Pandemic (2020-present) ===
The last event UCW Zero produced was MochiPalooza 2020 in February, with the following show set to be UCW's 18th Anniversary Show. By March 2020, however, the coronavirus pandemic halted production of several professional wrestling programs across the globe, including UCW.

== Championships of UCW-Zero ==
=== Current champions ===
Championship	Current champion(s)	Reign	Date won	Days held	Location	Event	Former champion(s)
UCW-Zero Heavyweight Championship	Martin Casus	1	October 5, 2019	2502	Salt Lake City, Utah	UCW-Zero Training Center	Tray Matthews
UCW-Zero Tag Team Championship	Christian Connors & Odwun	1	August 3, 2019	2565	Salt Lake City, Utah	UCW-Zero Training Center	Dream Team
UCW-Zero Ultra X Championship	Odwun	1	January 11, 2020	2473	Salt Lake City, Utah	UCW-Zero Training Center	Vacant
UCW-Zero Women's Championship	Tommy Purr	1	July 13, 2019	2586	Salt Lake City, Utah	UCW-Zero Training Center	Helen Ward

=== Previous championships ===
Championship	Final Champion(s)	Defeated	Date Won	Location	Event
UCW-Zero Cruiserweight Championship	Dante Acosta	Zack James	N/A	Salt Lake City, Utah	Retired
UCW-Zero Mexico Championship (Note: This was a singles title in Ultra Championship Wrestling-Zero. It was first won by Los Mochi Paco at the Latino Americano Festival in Provo, Utah on August 31, 2007, and was defended mainly in Utah. Although regarded somewhat as a "gimmick title" (e.g. "Million Dollar Man" Ted DiBiase's WWF Million Dollar Championship), as of November 2009, Los Mochi Paco is still defending the title making him the longest reigning champion in the promotion's history.)	Los Mochi Paco	Chip	August 31, 2007	Provo, Utah	Abandoned

== See also ==
- List of National Wrestling Alliance territories
- List of independent wrestling promotions in the United States
