= David Young (wrestler) =

American professional wrestler (born 1972)

Personal information
- Born: David Williams; August 25, 1972 (age 54) Knoxville, Tennessee, U.S.
- Children: 3

Professional wrestling career
- Ring name(s): David Young; Maki Inu
- Billed height: 5 ft 11 in (1.80 m)
- Billed weight: 238 lb (108 kg)
- Billed from: Lawrenceville, Georgia
- Trained by: Larry Santo
- Debut: August 23, 1989

David Williams (born August 25, 1972), better known by his ring name, David Young, is an American professional wrestler. Though he has mainly appeared with NWA Wildside and Total Nonstop Action Wrestling, Young has also competed for Ring of Honor, AAA and ZERO-ONE.

== Professional wrestling career ==
Williams was a professional wrestling fan from an early age, and announced his intention to become a wrestler to his parents at the age of five. On August 17, 1989 a seventeen-year-old Williams attended a wrestling show at which his friend was working as a security guard, and was asked to wrestle. He began training the next day with the Dalton, Georgia-based Mountain Wrestling Federation under Larry Santo, and adopted the ring name "David Young".

=== NWA Wildside (1999–2002) ===
Young, dubbed "the Messiah of the Spinebuster", spent his early career in National Championship Wrestling as a singles wrestler before joining the team Body Count with "Heavy Metal" Ric Savage. Young and Savage feuded with Rusty Riddle and Kid Kash for the National Championship Wrestling world tag-team titles. Young stayed with NCW as it grew into NWA Wildside where Young became known as a tag team specialist, teaming with Shane Austin as "The Sex Pistols". On August 19, 1999 The Sex Pistols defeated Bart Sawyer and Terry Lawler in Loganville, Georgia for the NWA Wildside (Georgia) Tag Team Championship. On November 4, Austin was replaced by Rick Michaels, with Young and Michaels naming themselves Bad Attitude. On November 20, 1999 in Cornelia, Georgia, Young and Michaels lost the Tag Team Championships to The Road Hoggs (Joe Harley and Pan Head Nelson). Bad Attitude continued to pursue the Wildside Tag Team Championships, and on January 11, 2000 they defeated The Underdogs (Mark E. Mark and Big Eddie Cool) for the NWA Wildside Tag Team Championship, which they held until February 19, when they were defeated by the Rock 'n' Roll Express. Bad Attitude reclaimed the Tag Team Titles on June 17 in a two out of three falls match, making Young a three time NWA Wildside Tag Team Champion.

Bad Attitude set their sights on the World Tag Team Championship, and on August 15 in Tampa, Florida they defeated Curtis Thompson and Jeff Justice for the NWA World Tag Team Championship. As a result, they were stripped of the Wildside Tag Team Championship on August 19. They held the World Tag Team Championship until February 3, 2001, when they lost to Joey Matthews and Christian York in Nashville, Tennessee. Bad Attitude reclaimed the title in their home territory, Cornelia, on February 17, but soon lost them once more, losing to Dan Factor and David Flair on March 22 in Athens, Georgia. They took the title a third time the next day in Toccoa, Georgia, with what would be their final reign lasting until April 24, when they lost to The New Heavenly Bodies (Casanova Chris and Vivacious Vito) in Tampa.

Michaels and Young eventually parted ways in a somewhat acrimonious split, and Michaels went on to win the NWA Wildside (Georgia) Heavyweight Championship. During a December 22, 2001 title defense against AJ Styles, Young interfered, enabling Styles to pin Michaels and win the belt. This led to a three-way dance on March 23, 2002 at Hardcore Hell 2002, with Young eventually taking the win and becoming the Wildside Heavyweight Champion. He held the title until June 1, when he lost to Jason Cross. After Cross retired from wrestling, Adam Jacobs won the vacant title, but failed to appear for an August 3 title defence against John Phoenix. Young, a Wildside mainstay, was substituted into the match, and defeated Phoenix to become a two-time Wildside Heavyweight Championship. He held the belt until September 22, 2002 when he lost to Edward Chastaine "Iceberg".

=== Total Nonstop Action Wrestling (2002–2007) ===
David Young joined Total Nonstop Action Wrestling in June 2002, and wrestled a dark match against Apolo on June 19. He worked in TNA as a lower-card heel. On September 24, 2003, Young acted as the tag team partner of Simon Diamond when Diamond's usual partner, Johnny Swinger, was sidelined with appendicitis. The next week, Young assumed that he was now a member of Glenn Gilbertti's stable, the New York Connection (NYC), along with Diamond and Swinger, but Gilberti insisted that he first had to "prove himself" by defeating The Sandman. Young lost, and was subsequently beaten down by Gilberti and his clients. The following week, Young earned a spot in the group by helping them defeat the 3 Live Kru in a six-man tag match.

The stable began to fall apart, and on January 14, 2004 split into two tag teams; Gilberti and Young, and Simon and Swinger. Gilberti and Young went on to feud with the Insane Clown Posse, with Young claiming to be afraid of clowns. Young then began regularly losing his matches, with his losing streak leading Gilberti to turn on him. On August 11, Young finally broke his losing streak by pinning Gilberti in a "Final Gut Check match", then left TNA for several months. He returned on December 24, losing to Abyss. Young appeared sporadically with TNA for several months, and on July 17 at No Surrender 2005 he reforged his alliance with Simon Diamond, who offered to make him "a diamond in the rough". On February 22, 2007, TNA released David Young.

At Slammiversary, on June 19, 2022, Young made an unannounced appearance as a participant in the Reverse Battle Royal, which he failed to win as he was eliminated by Johnny Swinger.

=== Georgia Championship Wrestling (2004–2008) ===
Young joined Georgia Championship Wrestling in mid-2004, forming a tag team with Sonny Siaki. Young and Siaki became the first ever GCW Tag Team Champions on July 27, 2004 in Columbus, Georgia when they defeated John Bogey and Jason Cross. They held the title until October 30, when they lost to A.J. Steele and Bull Buchanan.

Young formed a stable known as "Bad Company" with Bull Buchanan, The Wrestler (Ted Allen), and Sonny Siaki. However, on March 5, 2005 Buchanan and Young turned on Siaki and accepted the managerial services of Greg Brown. Young then went on to win the GCW Heavyweight Championship from Siaki, and on April 23 he and Buchanan won the GCW Tag Team Championship in a three-way tag match. On June 11, Buchanan teamed with Chris Stevens, the latter of whom replaced Young due to Young being unavailable for the title defense, and Buchanan and Stevens lost the GCW Tag Team Championship to John Bogie and Lee Thomas. Upon returning, Young teamed with Stevens to regain the titles on June 25.

Young lost the GCW Heavyweight Championship to Erik Watts on August 13, 2005. In October 2005, the promotion was renamed Great Championship Wrestling. On December 11, 2005, Young regained the GCW Heavyweight Championship from Watts. On January 1, 2006, Young and Stevens lost the GCW Tag Team Championships to Watts and Bogie. On April 22, 2006, Young lost the GCW Heavyweight Championship to Deathrow.

Young also appeared at Georgia Wrestling Promotions teaming with Bill DeMott to take on a hometown team in the main event. The following week he appeared again with DeMott as they went on to lose against Tank and Iceberg the main event.

Young continued to work for the company during its transition into "Great Championship Wrestling", and was featured on top in major feuds with Sonny Siaki and Johnny Swinger. After a bitter rivalry that lasted for three months with Siaki, the two were slated to battle on September 4 at the 2008 Fred Ward Memorial. However, on August 22, 2008, Great Championship Wrestling severed ties with Young, ending a long-standing business relationship.

== Personal life ==
David has 2 daughters, Amber and Kristina, and a son, Chris. The Williams family lives in Chatsworth, Georgia.

== Championships and accomplishments ==
Ericules Wrestling Promotions

  - EWP Heavyweight Championship (1 Time)

Great Championship Wrestling

  - GCW Heavyweight Championship (2 times)
  - GCW Columbus Heavyweight Championship (1 time)
  - GCW Tag Team Championship (5 times) – with Sonny Siaki (1), Bull Buchanan (1), Chris Stevens (2), and Elix Skipper (1)
- Hardkore Championship Wrestling
  - HCW Hardcore Championship (1 time)
- National Championship Wrestling
  - NCW Tag Team Championship (1 time) – with Rick Michaels
- National Wrestling Alliance
  - NWA World Tag Team Championship (3 times) – with Rick Michaels
  - NWA Smoky Mountain Tag Team Championship (1 time, current) – with Sigmon
  - NWA Southern Television Championship (1 time)
  - NWA Wildside Heavyweight Championship (2 times)
  - NWA Wildside Tag Team Championship (2 times) – with Shane Young (1) and Rick Michaels (1)
- NWA Worldwide
  - NWA Worldwide Television Championship (1 time)
  - NWA Wrestle Birmingham Tag Team Championship (1 time) – with Elix Skipper
- Pro Wrestling Illustrated
  - Ranked No. 372 of the top 500 singles wrestlers in the PWI 500 in 2009
- Ultra Championship Wrestling-Zero
  - UCW-Zero Heavyweight Championship (1 time)
