= The Silent Warrior =

American professional wrestler (born 1976)

Silent Warrior
Personal information
- Born: Louis Long; March 20, 1976 (age 50) Buffalo, New York, United States

Professional wrestling career
- Ring name: Silent Warrior
- Billed height: 6 ft 2 in (1.88 m)
- Billed weight: 237 lb (108 kg)
- Trained by: Brandon Thurston; Pepper Parks; Robbie E Blackjack Phoenix
- Debut: 2010

Louis Long (born March 20, 1976) is an American professional wrestler who competed in Japanese and international promotions, independent circuit under the ring name, The Silent Warrior (サイレント·ウォリアー).

== Early life ==
Long was born in Buffalo, New York and has been deaf since birth. He is one of eight siblings. As an athlete at St. Mary's School for the Deaf. Long was a co-captain of the varsity soccer, basketball, and Track and field teams. Long was a center for the St. Mary's basketball team. He remained on the team from 1992 to 1995. Long gained a reputation for being one of the best defensive players in basketball, establishing himself as a rugged rebounder. Long played in the Eastern Schools for the Deaf Athletic Association's annual Soccer Tournament in Scranton, Pennsylvania, St. Mary's Boys varsity soccer teams won Soccer Championship in 1994. Long's individual accolade and accomplishments include four Most Valuable Player (MVP) Awards, three Varsity Soccer Awards, and the 1995 Independent Athletic Conference (IAC) All-Star Award. Long attended Emerson Vocational High School from St. Mary's in Buffalo, New York, where he studies Culinary Art. Long was former Erie Community College culinary student, who finished his education at the Culinary Training Institute, cook at the New Era Field during Buffalo Bills' season. Long is a member of the American Culinary Federation.

== Professional wrestling career ==
=== Training and early years (2003-2013) ===
Long's first venture into wrestling was a stint in a backyard wrestling with his brother and friends. Long started in wrestling as a ringside photographer in 2003, he decided to train. Long started his professional wrestling training in January 2010 with Empire State Wrestling in North Tonawanda, New York under Brandon Thurston and Pepper Parks. During this time, Long was billed as The Silent Warrior. He then went on to Empire State Wrestling's training seminar in 2011 in Lockport, New York where he trained under Robbie E to whom he credits with most of his training. He returned to training in 2013 at the Pride Martial Arts Academy in Williamsville, New York under Blackjack Phoenix.

=== Independent circuit (2010-present) ===
Silent Warrior made his professional debut in November 2010. Silent Warrior began as a babyface wrestler in 2010. His career as a masked wrestler, The Silent Warrior, began in 2011 in Ontario, California. He used powerbomb on his way to MATA Wrestling Championship on November 12, 2011, in a win over Kawambura Yosiya and Sawaterio. Silent Warrior went on to defend the Touroumon Japan Pro Wrestling title for 12 months.

== Personal life ==
Long's grandfather, Raymond Cook, was his inspiration. Raymond, who died in 2004, was an avid fan of the sport and took his grandson to see the World Wrestling Federation at Buffalo Memorial Auditorium. He taught Long what he viewed as some of the most important things in life – to overcome what others think, to buckle down and focus on schoolwork and to love wrestling. He is an avid fisherman.

Long has become a benefactor to the deaf wrestling community, creating the Deaf Wrestling Alliance. He joined Cauliflower Alley Club Lifetime Member, which holds annual reunions in Las Vegas.

Long has been married since 2017.

Long is a fan of boxing and mixed martial arts. He has practiced Brazilian jiu-jitsu and Judo.

== Championships and accomplishments ==
- Touroumon Japan Pro Wrestling

- Japan's Touroumon Pro Wrestling Championship (1 time)

- Pro Wrestling Illustrated
  - PWI ranked him # 478 of the 500 top singles wrestlers in the PWI 500 in 2015.
  - PWI ranked him # 484 of the 500 top singles wrestlers in the PWI 500 in 2014
  - PWI ranked him # 466 of the 500 top singles wrestlers in the PWI 500 in 2013
  - PWI ranked him # 495 of the 500 top singles wrestler in the PWI 500 in 2012.

== Newspaper covers ==
- The Buffalo News Sports - (July 8, 2013)
