= American Digger (magazine) =

American Digger Magazine
- Editor: Butch Holcombe
- Categories: Hobby magazine
- Frequency: Bi-monthly
- Publisher: Greybird Publishing
- Founded: 2004
- First issue: January 2005
- Country: United States
- Based in: Acworth, Georgia
- Language: English
- Website: www.americandigger.com

American Digger is a bimonthly magazine about the hobby of recovering historical artifacts based in the United States.

== History ==
American Digger was founded in 2004. The founder is Butch Holcombe and the first issue appeared in January 2005. It includes articles covering finds made by metal detecting, surface hunting, diving, and sifting. It also contains photo stories on old coins, Civil War and Revolutionary War relics, stone artifacts, fossils, and bottles.

It was founded in response to reader requests for more material related to amateur archeology. Holcombe has said he wants to help bridge the gap between professional archeologists and amateur historians and has said he promotes only the responsible excavation and documentation of artifacts.

Founder Butch Holcombe is a humorist and amateur historian from Atlanta, Georgia. He was born in 1955, and since 1968 has spent numnerous hours searching for historic artifacts with a metal detector. He has since founded Greybird Publishers, who now publishes the magazine, as well as other books related to artifacts. In 2011, the name American Digger was licensed as a registered trademark.

== Circulation ==
"The first issue of American Digger was 52 pages of black and white, with a circulation of only 500. This has now grown to 74 pages, much of which is in color, with a current print circulation of over 2000 in all 50 states, Canada, Jordan and Australia", quoted by Publisher Butch Holcombe "." "Subscriptions are also sent free to US aircraft carriers on tour. In 2012, a digital version of the print magazine was offered for the first time, resulting in a worldwide interest. The magazine now claims a readership of over 20,000 including both platforms.

== Featured Articles ==
- Just Dug, which is a collection of photos of recently recovered items submitted by readers.
- Can You ID written by noted Civil War artifact author Charles Harris and a network of experts attempt to identify items of significance recovered by both hobbyists and professionals.
- Stumpt contains photos of items which noted Civil War artifact author Charles Harris can not identify. This has resulted in several unknown or previously misidentified relics being positively identified by readers.
- News-n-Views by Mark Schuessler documents changes in laws and legal matters connected with artifacts and their recovery.
- The Whole Truth by Butch Holcombe, light hearted look at what is happening in the world of relic hunting and collecting.
- Beepin' by Steve Meinzer, a cartoon series concerning metal detecting, running exclusively in American Digger.
- What's the Point by Jim Roberson, concerns identification of arrowheads and stone artifacts. This column was ended after Roberson's retirement in May 2015.
- Past columns include The Savage Facts by Ric Savage, which dealt with fraud and fakes in the world of antiquities, and how to spot them. Savage was dismissed from the magazine in early 2012 after becoming the star of a reality TV show which has no direct connection to the magazine of the same name.The show name has now been changed as a result of a settled lawsuit filed by Greybird Publishers.

== Publisher ==
The magazine is published by Greybird Publishing LLC, Acworth, GA.

== Related Ventures ==
In 2010, American Digger magazine took over a weekly internet radio show, Relic Roundup, previously owned and operated by My History Project, a non profit group in Atlanta, GA. The name was changed to American Digger's Relic Roundup at that time. The show averages several hundred listeners weekly, and is an extension of the magazine's focus on amateur archaeology and collecting.
