= The Russian Assassins =

Professional wrestling tag team

Tag team
- Name: The Russian Assassins
- Members: Dave Shelton; Jack Victory
- Billed from: Soviet Union
- Debut: 1988
- Disbanded: August 26, 1989
- Years active: 1988–1989

The Russian Assassins were a professional wrestling tag team consisting of Dave Sheldon and Jack Victory.

== Jim Crockett Promotions (1988–1989) ==
=== Beginnings ===
Previously having wrestled as The Angel of Death, Sheldon made his first appearance as the masked "Russian Assassin" on the June 18th, 1988 episode of World Championship Wrestling. Managed by Paul Jones, he defeated The Italian Stallion. Jones billed the Assassin and fellow Russian wrestler Ivan Koloff as his new Powers of Pain, replacing the Warlord & Barbarian who had just departed for the World Wrestling Federation. Sheldon would team with Koloff throughout the summer of 1988, fulfilling the dates vacated by the old Powers of Pain and facing The Road Warriors in a series of scaffold matches.

On September 7, 1988 at Clash of Champions III Ivan Koloff faced Ricky Morton in a Russian chain match. After Morton defeated Koloff he then argued with manager Paul Jones. After shoving Jones down he was attacked by partner The Russian Assassin. Moments later he was joined by a second masked wrestler - The Russian Assassin #2.

=== The Russian Assassins ===
The second Russian Assassin was Jack Victory, having just arrived from World Class Championship Wrestling. He made his debut for the NWA on September 23, 1988 at house show in Frederick, MD. Wrestling under a mask as "The Russian Assassin #2, he faced Brad Armstrong. After wrestling on various house shows in singles competition, he united Sheldon officially as The Russian Assassins. The new duo made their debut on October 7 at a taping for NWA Pro, defeating Ivan Koloff and Nikita Koloff via disqualification. Managed by Paul Jones, the Assassins would face the Koloffs in numerous house shows in the fall. Their first loss came on October 21 in Detroit, MI when they were defeated by Ivan & Nikita.

On the November 12, 1988 edition of NWA Worldwide the Russian Assassins entered a tournament to claim the vacated United States Tag Team Championship, but fought the Koloffs to a double countout. The feud continued until the end of November at which point Nikita took a sabbatical from the promotion. At Clash of Champions IV in Chattanooga, TN on December 7 Ivan Koloff faced Paul Jones in a singles match. After Ivan pinned the manager, both Russian Assassins stormed the ring and attacked Koloff. The newly signed Junkyard Dog made the save, leading the feud to transition to matches against Koloff and Dog. Victory made his PPV debut on December 26, 1988 at Starrcade 88, where the Assassins defeated Koloff and the Junkyard Dog.

The Russian Assassins entered 1989 being booked into matches with a wider variety of opponents. At a house show on January 8 in Greensboro, NC the Assassins were defeated by The Midnight Express. Three days later they were beaten by the new team of Steve Doll & Scott Peterson at a house show in Seattle, WA, and again a day later at Portland, OR. Victory and Sheldon rebounded to defeat The Junkyard Dog & Ivan Koloff on January 13 in Las Vegas, and would defeat them on several additional house shows in January. The January 28, 1989 edition of Worldwide saw The Junkyard Dog team with Michael Hayes to defeat The Russian Assassins via disqualification. On the Clash of Champions V on February 15, 1989 in Cleveland, OH, the Russian Assassins opened the show in a match against The Midnight Express and were defeated.

== Aftermath ==
That Clash marked the end of the Russian Assassins tag-team, although Victory would continue to don the Assassins mask in singles competition. Victory was recast as "Secret Service" Jack Victory, a pseudo agent charged with protecting new manager Paul E Dangerously Paul Heyman. On February 20, 1989 at the Chi-Town Rumble PPV he again wrestled twice. First he donned the mask and competed as "Russian Assassin #1", falling to Michael Hayes. In his second match, he replaced the departed Dennis Condrey to team with Randy Rose & Paul E Dangerously in a losing effort against The Midnight Express & Jim Cornette in a losing team leaves the NWA match.

In March 1989 he continued to perform under two characters - Russian Assassin #2 and "Secret Service" Jack Victory. At a TV taping on March 12 he lost to Vince Young. The following day he competed as Secret Service, teaming with The Samoan Swat Team to defeat preliminary opposition. In April he transitioned to competing as Secret Service exclusively, and would later go on to team with Rip Morgan as The New Zealand Militia, and later The Royal Family from 1989 - 1991.

Sheldon would return to Stampede Wrestling following Clash of Champion V and would later compete in the United States Wrestling Association. He would return to World Championship Wrestling as one of the masked avatars of The Black Scorpion and would resume competing as The Angel of Death in 1991.
