= Russian Team =

Professional wrestling stable

Stable
- Members: Don Kernodle; Ivan Koloff; Nikita Koloff; Krusher Khruschev; Vladimir Petrov; Russian Assassin; Russian Assassin #2
- Billed from: Soviet Union
- Debut: 1984
- Disbanded: 1988
- Years active: 1984–1988

The Russian Team was a professional wrestling tag team and stable in the 1980s who attempted to prove their Soviet dominance over their opponents.

== History ==
The Russian Team was formed in December 1984 in the National Wrestling Alliance's Jim Crockett Promotions. It consisted of NWA World Tag Team Champions Don Kernodle and Ivan Koloff, both recently returned from the World Wrestling Federation, plus Ivan's nephew Nikita Koloff whom they were training. After they lost the title, Kernodle was fired and replaced with Krusher Khruschev.

The Koloffs and Kernodle had been named the NWA World Six-Man Tag Team Champions and after his firing, Kernodle was replaced with Kruschev mid reign. The new line-up won the NWA World Tag Team Championship twice (the second time without Kruschev as a championship team member). They feuded with Dusty Rhodes, Magnum T. A. and the Rock 'n' Roll Express. Nikita, mentored by Ivan, challenged Ric Flair for the NWA World Heavyweight Championship but was defeated by Flair in the main event of the 1985 Great American Bash. After his firing, former team member Kernodle teamed with his brother Rocky to feud with the Koloffs and helped the Express to win the Tag Team Title back from them at Starrcade '85: The Gathering.

They also had many hard-fought matches against the Road Warriors, who could match up in strength and size.

During their feud with Magnum T. A., Nikita won the United States Championship in a best of seven series. Then in October 1986, Magnum was injured in a car wreck and his career was over. Nikita left the Russian Team and joined Rhodes forcing Ivan and Krusher to feud with them.

Kruschev left JCP in December 1986 (to go to the WWF as Smash of Demolition) and Ivan replaced him with Vladimir Petrov to get Nikita. Ivan and Petrov continued to call themselves the Russian Team until they added Dick Murdoch a few months later.

In 1988, Ivan Koloff and his manager Paul Jones recruited two masked Russian Assassins to feud with Nikita. However, the Assassins and Jones turned on Koloff after he lost a Russian Chain match to Ricky Morton at Clash of the Champions III: Fall Brawl. Now a babyface, Ivan reunited with Nikita to feud with the Assassins.

After the Assassins attacked Nikita and put him out of action (in reality so he could tend to his unwell wife Mandy), Ivan replaced him as a tag partner with former rival Junkyard Dog. The Assassins would defeat Ivan and Dog at Starrcade '88 and one Assassin would lose to Michael Hayes at the Chi-Town Rumble early the next year. In late March 1989, Ivan and one Assassin left the company while the other continued in WCW without his mask under his regular ring identity Jack Victory.

== Championships and accomplishments ==
Only championships won as part of the Russian Team are listed. See individual members' articles for full title histories.

Don Kernodle

- National Wrestling Alliance

- NWA World Tag Team Championship (1 time as Russian Team member)
- NWA World Six-Man Tag Team Championship (1 time)

Ivan Koloff

- National Wrestling Alliance

- NWA World Tag Team Championship (3 times as Russian Team member)
- NWA World Six-Man Tag Team Championship (1 time)
- NWA United States Tag Team Championship (1 time)

Nikita Koloff

- National Wrestling Alliance

- NWA United States Championship (1 time)
- NWA World Tag Team Championship (2 times)
- NWA World Six-Man Tag Team Championship (1 time)
- NWA National Heavyweight Championship (1 time)

Krusher Khruschev

- National Wrestling Alliance

- NWA Mid-Atlantic Heavyweight Championship (1 time)
- NWA World Tag Team Championship (1 time)
- NWA World Six-Man Tag Team Championship (1 time)
- NWA United States Tag Team Championship (1 time)

- Pro Wrestling Illustrated

- PWI ranked the Koloffs # 64 of the 100 best tag teams during the "PWI Years" in 2003.
