= Paul Jones' Army =

Professional wrestling stable

Stable
- Members: Paul Jones (leader); The Barbarian; The Warlord; Abdullah the Butcher; Superstar Billy Graham; Shaska Whatley; Baron von Raschke; Teijo Khan; Manny Fernandez; Rick Rude; Ivan Koloff; Vladimir Petrov; The Assassins (#1 and #2); The Russian Assassins (#1 and #2); Mighty Wilbur
- Debut: 1982
- Disbanded: 1986

Paul Jones' Army was a villainous professional wrestling stable active in Jim Crockett Promotions in the mid-1980s led by (and named for) manager Paul Jones. The group's primary storyline was against "The Boogie Woogie Man" Jimmy Valiant in a long running feud between Jones and Valiant.

== History ==
Paul Jones formed Paul Jones' Army in the early 1980s in Jim Crockett Promotions to help him battle "The Boogie Woogie Man" Jimmy Valiant and his allies, Manny Fernandez, Wahoo McDaniel, Pez Whatley and Hector Guerrero. In January 1984, Valiant was attacked by Paul Jones and The Assassins. They tied him to the wrestling ring ropes so that Jones could cut his beard off. This led to a grudge match at a supercard called 'Boogie Man Jam '84' in Greensboro, North Carolina. For this match, Dusty Rhodes in Valiant's corner was tied by a rope to Paul Jones. Valiant defeated Assassin II, who was unmasked and revealed as Hercules Hernandez.

Due to the beard cutting attack, Valiant feuded heavily with Paul Jones and his "Army" of wrestlers, from 1984 through to late 1986. This army of wrestlers included The Barbarian, Baron von Raschke, Teijo Khan, and The Assassins. During this three-year feud, Valiant received help from Héctor Guerrero and "Raging Bull" Manny Fernandez. Although Jimmy Valiant would lose a Loser Leaves Town Tuxedo Street Fight to Paul Jones at Starrcade '84: The Million Dollar Challenge in Greensboro, North Carolina the feud with Paul Jones' Army continued, which would come to include Abdullah The Butcher. In 1985, Valiant and Ragin' Bull Manny Fernandez formed a team called B and B Connection ("Boogie Woogie" and "Bull").

In the spring of 1986 Pez Whatley turned on Valiant, cutting off his pony tail, later joining Jones' Army as Shaska Whatley. During The Great American Bash 1986 summer shows, Paul Jones adopted a military style look in his long feud with Valiant and labeled his stable of wrestlers The Army. Valiant would beat Shaska Whatley in a hair vs hair match, but with outside interference lost a hair vs hair match to Paul Jones only weeks later.

In the fall of 1986, Manny Fernandez accepted Jones' money and turned on Valiant, starting a feud between the two. Paul Jones at this point shortened his army to his newly acquired tag team of Fernandez and Rick Rude. The war between Valiant and Paul Jones climaxed at Starrcade '86: The Skywalkers with Valiant putting up the hair of Big Mama against the hair of Paul Jones in a No DQ Match which Valiant won (while Fernandez was placed in a cage above the ring).

== Championships and accomplishments ==
- Jim Crockett Promotions
  - NWA World Tag Team Championship (1 time) - Manny Fernandez and Rick Rude
