= New Zealand Militia =

Professional wrestling tag team

Tag team
- Members: Jack Victory; Rip Morgan
- Name(s): Maulers; New Zealand Militia; Royal Family
- Debut: 1989
- Disbanded: 1992
- Years active: 1988–1992

The New Zealand Militia were a professional wrestling tag team consisting of Jack Victory and Rip Morgan. The duo began teaming in 1989 in World Championship Wrestling.

== History ==
=== Beginnings ===
Morgan had been a part of Jim Crockett Promotions in 1988, serving as the flag bearer for The Sheepherders. He had also spent time that year in World Class Championship Wrestling, where Victory also was wrestling and teaming with John Tatum. Victory would join the National Wrestling Alliance (Jim Crockett Promotions) in September 1988 as The Russian Assassin #2.

=== World Championship Wrestling (1989–1991) ===
==== New Zealand Militia (1989–1990) ====
On the April 22, 1989, episode of World Championship Wrestling, Victory teamed with Rip Morgan for the first time, but the new duo was defeated by Randy Rose and Ranger Ross. On the June 10 episode, Victory and Morgan's team became official; now known as the "New Zealand Militia", they faced the Dynamic Dudes (Shane Douglas and Johnny Ace) in the quarterfinals of a tournament to crown new NWA World Tag Team Champions.

The New Zealand Militia faced the Dynamic Dudes and the Ding Dongs in a series of house show matches. On the August 5, 1989, episode of World Championship Wrestling, Sting and Eddie Gilbert defeated the Militia via disqualification after Terry Funk and The Great Muta attacked Sting. A day later on WCW Main Event, the Militia were defeated by the Midnight Express. They rebounded on August 12 on NWA Pro to defeat the Dynamic Dudes, and on August 14 at a television taping in Charleston, West Virginia, the Milita defeat Ranger Ross and Scott Hall. That same month, the team was featured in NWA Wrestling Wrap-Up.

As the summer concluded, the New Zealand Militia transitioned to a house show series with the newly formed Steiner Brothers, but were unsuccessful in numerous matches. In September 1989, they resumed their feud with the Dynamic Dudes and would later move on to a house show series with the Road Warriors where they were winless. On the November 19 episode of WCW Main Event, they were defeated by Sting and Brian Pillman. Lord Littlebrook came to ringside, scolded Victory and Morgan, and said that if they were to listen to him he would take them to the top.

On the November 25, 1989 episode of World Championship Wrestling the Milita appeared with Lord Littlebrook for the first time and defeated Ricky Nelson and Mike Jackson. A week later, they defeated Carl Nelson and Mike Thor. The Militia's newfound win streak came to an abrupt end on the December 30 episode of World Championship Wrestling when they were defeated by Arn Anderson and Ole Anderson.

The Militia faced the Dynamic Dudes on the first 1990 episode of WCW Main Event. In January 1990, they faced Eddie Gilbert and Tommy Rich, trading wins on the house show circuit. On the February 3, 1990 episode of NWA Worldwide, the Militia entered a tournament to crown new WCW United States Tag Team Champions, but lost in the quarter-finals to eventual winners Brian Pillman and Tom Zenk. On the February 24, 1990 episode of NWA Worldwide, the Militia unsuccessfully challenged the Steiner Brothers for the NWA World Tag Team Championship.

==== Royal Family (1990–1991) ====
On the March 10, 1990 episode of World Championship Wrestling the New Zealand Militia was renamed the "Royal Family". Still managed by Lord Littlebrook, Victory was now dubbed "Jacko Victory". The Royal Family defeated Zan Panzer and GQ Stratus, and while successful in televised matches against preliminary competition, the Royal Family continued to be winless against the Road Warriors in house show matches. On March 30, 1990, the Royal Family defeated the Fantastics in Lynchburg, Virginia. The Royal Family defeated Rick Ryder and Rocky King on the May 19 episode of World Championship Wrestling; after this Victory temporarily left the promotion to compete in South Atlantic Pro Wrestling.

Victory returned to reform the Royal Family on December 16, 1990. WCW held the "Pat O'Connor International Tag Team Tournament" as part of Starrcade 1990, with eight teams representing various countries. The storyline was that the Royal Family had won a tournament in Australia to earn the rights to represent Australia and New Zealand; in reality none of the teams had won qualifying tournaments. Victory and Morgan lost to "Team Japan" (Masa Saito and The Great Muta) in the first round of the tournament. On February 24, 1991, the Royal Family competed at WrestleWar 91, losing to the Young Pistols.

On April 13, 1991 on WCW Pro, Victory and Morgan defeated the Lightning Express, and after the match the Royal Family said that they were going after both the United States and World Tag Team Championships. However the Royal Family was winless that month on the house show circuit, falling to the tandems of Big Josh and Dustin Rhodes and The Junkyard Dog and Tommy Rich. The Royal Family's last significant appearance with WCW was on April 28, 1991, where they teamed up with Black Bart as they unsuccessfully challenged the team of the Junkyard Dog, Ricky Morton, and Tommy Rich for the WCW World Six-Man Tag Team Championship. On May 1, 1990 on WCW Main Event, they were defeated by Sting and Lex Luger. On May 10 at a house show in Cincinnati, Ohio, the Royal Family lost in an upset to Ron Cumberledge and Brad Armstrong, and a day later lost to Junkyard Dog and Sam Houston. Now mired in a long losing streak, the Royal Family ended its WCW run with a defeat to Tom Zenk and The Junkyard Dog.

=== Global Wrestling Federation (1991) ===
In 1991, Victory and Morgan made their way to the Global Wrestling Federation in Dallas, Texas, this time as the "Maulers". The duo competed in the tournament for the first ever GWF Tag Team Championship. In the first round they defeated "Wet 'n' Wild" (Steve Ray and Sunny Beach), followed by a victory over Chaz and Terry Garvin. In the third round – the semi-finals of the tournament – the Maulers lost to eventual tournament winners Chris Walker and Steve Simpson.

=== World Wrestling Federation (1992) ===
Wrestling as the Maulers, Victory and Morgan also wrestled a dark match at a WWF Superstars taping in Mobile, Alabama on March 9, 1992, defeating Jim Cooper and John Allen.

=== Smoky Mountain Wrestling (1992) ===
The Maulers did not stay in the GWF after the tournament, instead moving on to Smoky Mountain Wrestling (SMW) in Tennessee. They competed in a tournament to determine the first ever SMW Tag Team Champions. In the first round the Maulers defeated the Rich Brothers (Davey Rich and Johnny Rich), but lost to the Fantastics (Bobby Fulton and Jackie Fulton) in the second round to be eliminated from the tournament. Their short lived run in SMW was the last time Morgan and Victory teamed together on a regular basis.
