= Jack Victory =

American professional wrestler and manager (born 1964)

Personal information
- Born: Kenneth Rinehurst; July 3, 1964 (age 62) Atlantic City, New Jersey, U.S.

Professional wrestling career
- Ring name(s): The Blackmailer; Jack Victory; Jacko Victory; Russian Assassin #2; Super Destroyer; The Terrorist; Titán
- Billed height: 6 ft 3 in (191 cm)
- Billed weight: 245 lb (111 kg)
- Billed from: New Zealand (as Jacko Victory); Atlantic City, New Jersey; Russia (as Russian Assassin #2)
- Debut: 1984
- Retired: 2021

Kenneth Rinehurst (born July 3, 1964) is an American professional wrestler and manager, better known by his ring name, Jack Victory. He is perhaps best known for his appearances with the Universal Wrestling Federation and the World Class Wrestling Association in the mid-1980s, with World Championship Wrestling between 1988 and 1991, and with Extreme Championship Wrestling between 1998 and 2001.

== Professional wrestling career ==
=== Universal Wrestling Federation (1984–1985) ===
Rinehurst debuted in 1984 in the Oklahoma City, Oklahoma-based Universal Wrestling Federation under the ring name Jack Victory. His first match came on October 10, 1984, when he teamed with Jake Roberts in a defeat to The Rock 'n' Roll Express at a Mid South (later UWF) TV taping in Shreveport, LA. The rookie remained winless through the remainder of the year, falling to Tim Horner, Butch Reed, Terry Taylor, Brad Armstrong, Terry Daniels, and others.

Horner continued his losing streak into 1985 before finally gaining his first victory on February 22, 1985, when he defeated Shawn Michaels in Houston, TX at an event for Houston Wrestling. Back in Mid-South he continued to drop matches. Victory unsuccessfully challenged The Snowman for the Mid-South Television Title on May 14, 1985, after which he left the promotion.

He went on to wrestle throughout the Southeastern United States.

=== World Class Championship Wrestling (1985–1986) ===
Six days after losing to The Snowman, Victory moved to the Texas-based World Class Championship Wrestling promotion. A month after he debut he gained his first victory for the promotion on June 24 in Fort Worth, TX when he defeated Mike Reed. At the summer of 1985 progressed Victory began to ascend, winning matches against Mike Bond, Johnny Mantell, and Ranji while continuing to lose matches to more established veterans. He won his first championship on December 9, 1985, when he defeated David Peterson to win the WCCW Television Championship. Victory lost the title to Mark Youngblood less than a month later. His last match came on March 3, 1986, when he teamed with "Mr. Electricity" Steve Regal to face The Fantastics.

=== Universal Wrestling Federation (1986–1987) ===
Jack Victory returned to Mid South Wrestling (UWF) on March 17, 1986, losing to Brett Sawyer at a television taping in Tulsa. Six days later he gained his first ever MSW victory, defeating Sean O'Reilly in Houston, TX. In this second run Victory was more successful, defeating Terry Taylor and Ricky Gibson. On April 13, 1986, he scored the largest victory of his nascent career when he upset Steve Williams on an MSW televised event in Tulsa, OK.

Victory began to accompany The Sheepherders to ringside while carrying the New Zealand flag. On June 10, 1986, he teamed with The Sheepherders in a losing effort to Terry Taylor & The Fantastics in Plaquemine, LA.

He then formed a tag team with John Tatum. Managed by Tatum's girlfriend, Missy Hyatt, Victory and Tatum won the UWF Tag Team Championship On October 26, 1986, at a UWF TV Taping in Tulsa. Victory, Tatum and Hyatt joined "Hot Stuff International", a stable headed by "Hot Stuff" Eddie Gilbert. The new UWF Tag-Team Champions successfully defended the titles against The Fantastics, as well as Chavo Guerrero & Jeff Raitz before losing to Bill Irwin & Leroy Brown on November 9, 1986.

=== World Class Wrestling Association (1987) ===
Jack Victory jumped to the World Class Wrestling Association (World Class Championship Wrestling) in February 1987, losing to Matt Borne on February 23 at a house show in Fort Worth, TX. Victory was less successful in his initial run in this new promotion, losing to the Fantastics, Red River Jack, Jeep Swenson, Dingo Warrior, and others throughout the spring. His final match came on May 11, 1987, when he faced Cousin Junior.

=== Wild West Wrestling (1987) ===
He then jumped to Wild West Wrestling, making his first appearance in a six-man match when he teamed with John Tatum & Gatu Vera to lose to Bill Irwin, The Missing Link, and La Sirenta at a Wild West television taping on July 21. On November 30, 1987, he teamed with Tatum to win the vacated Wild West Tag Team Championship by defeating Jeff Raitz and The Missing Link in the finals of a tournament. They became the first tag team champions of the organization. These titles would unify with the WCCW tag team championship on the 12th of October, 1988.

=== World Class Wrestling Association (1987–1988) ===
Victory jumped back to WCWA along with John Tatum on December 25, 1987, facing The Fantastics at WCWA Christmas Star Wars 1987. Three days later Victory & Tatum defeated Solomon Grundy & Skip Young via disqualification to win the World Class Texas Tag-Team Championship.

On March 30, 1988, the duo lost the tag-team championship to Shaun Simpson & Steve Simpson at an event in Fort Worth, but would regain the belts on April 8. The Simpson Brothers would win back the titles once more during the spring of 1988, but then lost the championship by countout to Victory and Tatum at the 5th Von Erich Memorial Parade of Champions on May 8. The four continued to feud with each other through the summer, and Victory's final match with the promotion came on September 5, 1988, when he faced Steve Cox at an event in Fort Worth.

=== Jim Crockett Promotions (1988–1991) ===
==== Russian Assassins (1988–1989) ====
Jack Victory made his debut for the NWA on September 23, 1988, at house show in Frederick, MD. Wrestling under a mask as "The Russian Assassin #2, he faced Brad Armstrong. After wrestling on various house shows in singles competition, he united with a masked Dave Sheldon as The Russian Assassins. The new duo made their debut on October 7 at a taping for NWA Pro, defeating Ivan Koloff and Nikita Koloff via disqualification. Managed by Paul Jones, the Assassins would face the Koloffs in numerous house shows in the fall. Their first loss came on October 21 in Detroit, MI when they were defeated by Ivan & Nikita.

On the November 12, 1988 edition of NWA Worldwide the Russian Assassins entered a tournament to claim the vacated NWA United States Tag Team Championship but fought the Koloffs to a double countout. The feud continued until the end of November at which point Nikita took a sabbatical from the promotion. At Clash of Champions IV in Chattanooga, TN on December 7 Ivan Koloff faced Paul Jones in a singles match. After Ivan pinned the manager, both Russian Assassins stormed the ring and attacked Koloff. The newly signed Junkyard Dog made the save, leading the feud to transition to matches against Koloff and Dog. Victory made his PPV debut on December 26, 1988, at Starrcade 88, where the Assassins defeated Koloff and the Junkyard Dog.

The Russian Assassins entered 1989 being booked into matches with a wider variety of opponents. At a house show on January 8 in Greensboro, NC the Assassins were defeated by The Midnight Express. Three days later they were beaten by the new team of Steve Doll & Scott Peterson at a house show in Seattle, WA, and again a day later at Portland, OR. Victory and Sheldon rebounded to defeat The Junkyard Dog & Ivan Koloff on January 13 in Las Vegas, and would defeat them on several additional house shows in January. The January 28, 1989 edition of Worldwide saw The Junkyard Dog team with Michael Hayes to defeat The Russian Assassins via disqualification. Victory would find himself wrestling twice at Clash of Champions V on February 15, 1989, in Cleveland, OH. The Russian Assassins opened the show in a match against The Midnight Express. Later in the night Victory wrestled in singles competition. Appearing as "The Blackmailer" and managed by Hiro Matsuda, he faced Lex Luger and was defeated.

That Clash marked the end of the Russian Assassins tag-team, although he would continue to don the Assassins mask in singles competition. Victory was recast as "Secret Service" Jack Victory, a pseudo agent charged with protecting new manager Paul E Dangerously Paul Heyman. On February 20, 1989, at the Chi-Town Rumble PPV he again wrestled twice. First he donned the mask and competed as "Russian Assassin #1", falling to Michael Hayes. In his second match, he replaced the departed Dennis Condrey to team with Randy Rose & Paul E Dangerously in a losing effort against The Midnight Express & Jim Cornette in a losing team leaves the NWA match.

In March 1989 he continued to perform under two characters - Russian Assassin #2 and "Secret Service" Jack Victory. At a TV taping on March 12 he lost to Vince Young. The following day he competed as Secret Service, teaming with The Samoan Swat Team to defeat preliminary opposition. On March 25 on World Championship Wrestling Victory attacked partner Randy Rose, and would be seen being paid off by manager Paul E Dangerously on the April 9th edition of NWA Main Event.

In April he transitioned to competing as Secret Service exclusively. Victory faced Lex Luger at Clash of Champions VI on April 2, 1989, in the SuperDome in a match that was bumped from the live airing due to the card going long; the match would ultimately be shown on the next episode of World Championship Wrestling. On the April 15th edition of NWA Worldwide he received a non-title match against NWA World Heavyweight Champion Ricky Steamboat, but was pinned. On the same day on World Championship Wrestling, Victory pinned Randy Rose.

==== New Zealand Militia / Royal Family (1989–1991) ====
On the April 22, 1989 episode of World Championship Wrestling he teamed with Rip Morgan for the first time, but the new duo was defeated by Randy Rose and Ranger Ross. On the May 13th edition of World Championship Wrestling he unsuccessfully challenged Sting for the NWA World Television Championship. On the June 10th edition he dropped the "Secret Service" character and instead formed an official team with Rip Morgan. Now known as The New Zealand Militia, they faced The Dynamic Dudes (Shane Douglas & Johnny Ace) in the quarterfinals of a tournament to crown new NWA World Tag Team Champions.

Victory competed once more under a match on June 14, 1989, at Clash of Champions VII in Fort Bragg, North Carolina. Wrestling as "The Terrorist", he was defeated by Ranger Ross. After this he began teaming with Morgan full-time, facing the Dynamic Dudes and Ding Dongs in a series of house show matches. On the August 5th edition of World Championship Wrestling Sting & Eddie Gilbert defeated Victory & Morgan via disqualification after Terry Funk and The Great Muta attacked Sting. A day later on The Main Event the Militia were defeated by The Midnight Express. They rebounded on August 12 on NWA Pro to defeat The Dynamic Dudes, and on August 14 at a TV taping in Charleston WV the Milita would defeat Ranger Ross & Scott Hall.

As the summer concluded The New Zealand Militia transitioned to a house show series with the newly formed Steiner Brothers, but were unsuccessful in numerous matches. In September they resumed their feud with the Dynamic Dudes and would later move on to a house show series with The Road Warriors where they were winless. On the November 19th edition of Main Event they were defeated by Sting & Brian Pillman. Lord Littlebrook came to ringside, scolded Victory and Morgan, and said that if they were to listen to him he would take them to the top.

On Clash of Champions IX in Troy, NY on November 15 he donned a mask yet again, this time competing as "The Super Destroyer. He faced Steve Williams and was defeated. Maskless again, on the November 25th edition of World Championship Wrestling the Milita appeared with Lord Littlebrook for the first time and defeated Ricky Nelson & Mike Jackson. A week later they would defeat Carl Nelson & Mike Thor. The Militia's newfound win streak came to an abrupt end on the December 30th edition of World Championship Wrestling when they were defeated by Arn Anderson & Ole Anderson.

The New Zealand Militia faced The Dynamic Dudes on the first 1990 episode of the Main Event. In January they faced Eddie Gilbert & Tommy Rich, trading wins on the house show circuit. On the February 3, 1990 edition of NWA Worldwide the New Zealand Militia entered a tournament to crown new United States Tag-Team Champions but lost in the quarter finals to eventual winners Brian Pillman & Tom Zenk. On the February 24, 1990 edition of NWA Worldwide the Militia unsuccessfully challenged The Steiner Brothers for the NWA Tag-Team Championship.

On the March 10th edition of World Championship Wrestling the New Zealand Militia was renamed The Royal Family. Still managed by Lord Littlebrook, Victory was now dubbed "Jacko Victory". The Royal Family defeated Zan Panzer & GQ Status, and while successful in televised matches against preliminary competition, The Royal Family continued to be winless against The Road Warriors in house show matches. On March 30, 1990, the Royal Family defeated The Fantastics in Lynchburg, VA. The Royal Family defeated Rick Ryder & Rocky King on the May 19th episode of World Championship Wrestling; after this Victory temporarily left the promotion to compete in South Atlantic Pro Wrestling.

Victory returned to reform The Royal Family on December 16, 1990. WCW held the "Pat O'Connor International Tag Team Tournament" as part of the 1990 Starrcade with eight teams representing various countries. The storyline was that the Royal Family had won a tournament in Australia to earn the rights to represent Australia and New Zealand; in reality none of the teams had won qualifying tournaments. Victory and Morgan lost to "Team Japan" (Masa Saito and The Great Muta) in the first round of the tournament. On February 24, 1991, the Royal Family competed at the WrestleWar 91 PPV, losing to The Young Pistols. On April 13, 1991, on NWA Pro Victory & Morgan defeated The Lightning Express, and after the match the Royal Family said that they were after both the United States and World Tag-Team Championships.

However the Royal Family was winless that month on the house show circuit, falling to the tandems of Big Josh & Dustin Rhodes and The Junkyard Dog & Tommy Rich. The Royal Family's last significant appearance with WCW was on April 28, 1991, where they teamed up with Black Bart as they unsuccessfully challenged the team of the Junkyard Dog, Ricky Morton and Tommy Rich for the WCW World Six-Man Tag Team Championship. On May 1, 1990, on The Main Event they were defeated by Sting & Lex Luger. On May 10 at a house show in Cincinnati, Ohio the Royal Family lost in an upset to Ron Cumberledge & Brad Armstrong, and a day later fell to The Junkyard Dog & Sam Houston. Now mired in a long losing streak, the Royal Family ended its WCW run with a defeat to Tom Zenk & The Junkyard Dog.

=== Global Wrestling Federation (1991) ===
In 1991 Victory and Morgan made their way to the Global Wrestling Federation in Dallas, Texas, this time as "The Maulers." The duo competed in the tournament for the first ever GWF Tag Team Championship. In the first round they defeated "Wet'n'Wild" (Steve Ray and Sunny Beach), followed by a victory over Chaz and Terry Garvin. In the third round—the semi-finals of the tournament—the Maulers lost to eventual tournament winners Chris Walker and Steve Simpson.

=== World Wrestling Federation (1992) ===
Wrestling as the Maulers, Victory and Morgan also wrestled a dark match at a WWF Superstars taping in Mobile, Alabama on March 9, 1992, defeating Jim Cooper and John Allen.

=== Smoky Mountain Wrestling (1992) ===
The Maulers did not stay in the GWF after the tournament, instead moving on to Smoky Mountain Wrestling (SMW) in Tennessee. They competed in a tournament to determine the first ever SMW Tag Team Champions. In the first round the Maulers defeated the Rich Brothers (Davey Rich and Johnny Rich), but lost to The Fantastics (Bobby Fulton and Jackie Fulton) in the second round to be eliminated from the tournament. Their short lived run in SMW was the last time Morgan and Victory teamed together on a regular basis.

=== Consejo Mundial De Lucha Libre (1992) ===
In the latter half of 1992, Victory was a regular for Consejo Mundial de Lucha Libre, wrestling as Titán. His first match came on January 8, 1992, when he teamed with Kahoz & MS-1 to defeat Lazor Tron, Mano Negra & Oro in Mexico City. Wrestling as "Big Bang", he teamed with El Gran Markus Jr & El Supremo I to defeat Aaron Grundy, El Dandy, and Mascara Magica on a CMLL televised event on July 31, 1992. His final match came on December 29, 1992, when he teamed with El Gran Markus Jr & Sultan Gargola to face Blue Demon Jr, Kato Kung Lee, and Lazer Tron.

=== Various Promotions (1992–1998) ===
During his CMLL run he also made a brief return to the Global Wrestling Federation, losing to GWF North American Champion Rod Price in Dallas, TX on September 18, 1992. The same night he defeated Jim Ryder. After his time in Mexico, he returned to the American independents.

=== Extreme Championship Wrestling (1998–2001) ===
In 1998, Victory debuted in Extreme Championship Wrestling as a mercenary hired to assault New Jack. His first appearance came on May 16, 1998, when he emerged from the crowd to attack New Jack at an event in Philadelphia. Victory's first match came on May 29, when he defeated John Kronus at a house show in Baton Rouge.

Victory was scheduled to make his ECW PPV debut at Heat Wave 98 in Dayton, OH on August 2, 1998, in a match against New Jack. The match was called off after New Jack was attacked by The Dudley Boyz. Victory would appear during the main event to attack Tommy Dreamer; New Jack would then come out and attack Victory. This angle led to a fall 1998 feud with Tommy Dreamer which saw the ECW mainstay gain numerous victories. His initial ECW run ended when he broke his leg at 1998's November to Remember in a tag team match pitting himself and Justin Credible against Tommy Dreamer and Jake "The Snake" Roberts, when he was backdropped over the top rope by Dreamer.

While using a wheelchair for rehabilitation, Victory became the manager of Steve Corino. When his leg healed, Victory began interfering in Corino's matches on behalf of his client. Along with Corino, Victory was a member of the stable known as The Network. Ten months after breaking his leg he made his return to in-ring action, teaming with Corino to face Jazz & Francine at a house show in Dalton, GA on August 21, 1999.

On August 29, 1999, he teamed with Rhino in an unsuccessful attempt to wrest the ECW Tag-Team Championship from Tommy Dreamer & Raven. During the fall Corino & Victory would face the ECW champions on the house show circuit. During 2000 the duo faced Dreamer & Sandman, as well as Dusty Rhodes. On September 23, 2000, Victory challenged ECW World Champion Justin Credible in Danbury, CT but was defeated. Steve Corino would ultimately win the ECW title, with Victory frequently appearing in his corner. He remained in ECW until the promotion declared bankruptcy in April 2001, defeating C.W. Anderson on the promotion's last show in January 2001.

=== Independent circuit (2001–2021) ===
Following the closure of ECW, Victory began wrestling on the independent circuit. Along with several other ECW alumni, he made several appearances with the Premier Wrestling Federation, winning the PWF Tag Team Championship in February 2002 and the PWF Xtreme Championship in August 2002. He also wrestled for Pro-Pain Pro Wrestling, Pro Wrestling Zero1, and Ring of Honor.

His most recent match came on October 23, 2021, when he teamed with Colby Corino to face The Kirks (Brandon Kirk & Kasey Kirk) in Port Richey, FL.

== Championships and accomplishments ==
- Premier Wrestling Federation
  - PWF Tag Team Championship (1 time) – with Guillotine LeGrande
  - PWF Xtreme Championship (1 time)
- Universal Wrestling Federation
  - UWF Tag Team Championship (1 time) – with John Tatum
- Western Ohio Wrestling
  - WOW Tag Team Championship (1 time) - with Rip Morgan
- Wild West Wrestling
  - WWW Tag Team Championship (2 times) – with John Tatum
- World Class Championship Wrestling/World Class Wrestling Association
  - WCCW Television Championship (1 time)
  - WCWA Texas Tag Team Championship (3 times) – with John Tatum
  - Wild West tag team titles (1 time)
- Wrestling Observer Newsletter awards
  - Rookie of the Year (1985)
