= Angel of Death (wrestler) =

American professional wrestler (1953-2007)

Personal information
- Born: David Sheldon; July 20, 1953 Arlington, Texas, U.S.
- Died: November 25, 2007 (aged 54) Bedford, Texas, U.S.

Professional wrestling career
- Ring name(s): The Angel; Angel of Death; The Black Scorpion; Russian Assassin #I
- Billed height: 6 ft 5 in (196 cm)
- Billed weight: 310 lb (141 kg)
- Billed from: "Parts unknown" (as Angel of Death)
- Trained by: Bill Anderson
- Debut: 1985
- Retired: 1995

David Sheldon (July 20, 1953 – November 25, 2007) was an American professional wrestler, better known by his ring name, Angel of Death.

Sheldon wrestled in various North American regional promotions during the 1980s and early 1990s including Stampede Wrestling, World Class Championship Wrestling (WCCW), the Universal Wrestling Federation (UWF) (as the bodyguard of The Freebirds) and in Jim Crockett Promotions (where he was the first man to portray the masked wrestler "The Black Scorpion").

== Professional wrestling career ==
=== Early career (1985–1987) ===
Sheldon debuted in 1985. In early 1986, he began wrestling with "Strangler" Steve DiSalvo as "The Angel of Death" in the Calgary-based Stampede Wrestling and faced mainstays such as Johnny Smith and feuded with Owen Hart eventually losing to him and Bruce Hart in a tag team match with Robbie Stewart in Fort Qu'Appelle, Saskatchewan on April 28, and to him and Ben Bassarab in Calgary, Alberta on June 20, 1986. Moving on to Bill Watts' Universal Wrestling Federation as "The Angel of Death", he appeared at several Superdome Extravaganza supercards in late 1986 feuding with Ken Massey although he later lost to The Freebirds in a 6-man tag team match with Bill Irwin and The Viking on April 11. As "Angel of Death", His gimmick was to play Taps on a trumpet before his match.

Returning to Calgary to face Owen Hart in single matches in May 1987, their first matchup resulted in a double disqualification on May 21 although he was defeated in rematches on May 22 and May 24. While still in the Mid-South region, he continued to appear on Superdome Extravaganza events teaming with Vladimir Petrov against the then NWA Tag Team Champions The Rock 'n' Roll Express on June 13, 1987.

=== Jim Crockett Promotions / World Championship Wrestling (1987–1991) ===
He also began wrestling for Jim Crockett Promotions during the mid-1980s, teaming with Big Bubba Rogers and manager Skandor Akbar against UWF Tag Team Champions The Lightning Express at the Great American Bash '87 on July 31, 1987. He also competed in Dallas-based independent promotions early in his career including World Class Championship Wrestling later losing to The Missing Link and Jason Sterling in a tag team match with Vince Apollo and later participated in a "triple dome Texas roundup" match at the last WCCW Parade of Champions supercard on May 8, 1988.

Returning to Jim Crockett Promotions as one half of The Russian Assassins with Jack Victory, he and Victory feuded with Ivan Koloff who had left Paul Jones' Army during late 1988 eventually defeating Koloff and Junkyard Dog at Starrcade '88. Returning to Stampede Wrestling in mid 1989, he wrestled against Kim Schau, Ron Ritchie and Eddie Watts before the promotion closed later that year. In 1990, he was awarded the WCCW Texas Heavyweight Championship by forfeit from then champion Kerry Von Erich in Dallas, Texas on July 13, although he lost the title to Kevin Von Erich four months later on November 23, 1990.

In August 1990, while competing in World Championship Wrestling (WCW), Sheldon also began wrestling as "The Black Scorpion" at house shows. The identity of The Black Scorpion, speculated by announcers at the time to have been a former friend of Sting, was hinted to be as one of several wrestlers then competing in World Championship Wrestling including The Angel of Death, having been a former training partner of Sting while a part of Powerteam USA several years before. While wrestling as The Black Scorpion during that time, the character who eventually wrestled Sting was Al Perez (and at the conclusion of the storyline was eventually revealed to be longtime rival Ric Flair at Starrcade 1990) by the time of their first encounter at Clash of the Champions XII on September 5, 1990.

=== Late career (1991–1995) ===
During the early 1990s, Sheldon continued wrestling in Texas independent promotions winning the TWF Tag team titles with Abdullah the Butcher in 1990, although they eventually lost the belts to Steve Austin and "The California Studd" Rod Price on November 11, 1990. Following the close of WCCW in January 1991, he lost to Kevin Von Erich on February 23 in a match for the vacant WCCW Texas Heavyweight Championship recognized by the now defunct Texas Wrestling Federation before it closed three months later. Later aligning himself with Kevin Sullivan and One Man Gang, the three attacked El Gigante following his match against Tony Mella before Ron Simmons ran in chasing the three out of the ring during a televised WCW event in Dothan, Alabama on May 11, 1991. The next week he appeared on WCW Saturday Night, attacking Ron Simmons as Simmons had a match the following evening against Butch Reed, another of Teddy Long's charges. While in the Global Wrestling Federation, he teamed with Eddie Gilbert in his feud with Big Bad John facing Big Bad John in tag team matches with Dark Patriot on April 10 and Barry Horowitz on April 17 in a steel cage match resulting in a no contest. Turning against Gilbert, he was later defeated by Gilbert, John Tatum and Rod Price in a 6-man tag team match with Horowitz and Johnny Mantell on April 24, 1992. He was scheduled to wrestle Bruiser Brody and Kerry Von Erich at the time of their deaths; however, his own career was also cut short after suffering a severe leg injury after wrestling a match against P. N. News (as a result, P. N. News was taken off WCW television for the remainder of his contract and eventually released from the company). Wrestling sporadically in the promotion during the 1990s, he occasionally appeared on WCW Saturday Night.

Sheldon retired in 1995.

== Death ==
It was reported that Sheldon was found dead in Bedford, Texas, in November 2007. He was found on his couch with the TV remote in his hand. His body was claimed by his "little sister", Missy Evans, a close friend for more than 20 years. He did not have close family living near him, but a sister with whom he had not spoken in more than 20 years was said to be living in Miami at the time of his death. Sheldon's friends gathered on December 8, 2007, at a memorial service in North Richland Hills that Evans planned. Many wrestling greats were there, including Terry Taylor and Cowboy Johnny Mantell. His ashes are buried at Bear Creek Cemetery in Euless, Texas. Sheldon's dearest friend from high school, Pat Mitchell, provided early and later wrestling career highlights to the Fort Worth Star-Telegram for a full-page obituary.

== Championships and accomplishments ==
- Texas Wrestling Federation
  - TWF Tag Team Championship (1 time) – with Abdullah the Butcher
- World Class Championship Wrestling
  - WCCW Texas Heavyweight Championship (1 time)
