= Vladimir Petrov (wrestler) =

American professional wrestler (1957–2024)

Personal information
- Born: Alan Richard Blake; November 12, 1957 Minneapolis, Minnesota, U.S.
- Died: July 27, 2024 (aged 66) Pine City, Minnesota, U.S.

Professional wrestling career
- Ring name(s): Al Blake; Vladimir Petrov
- Billed height: 6 ft 3 in (1.91 m)
- Billed weight: 285 lb (129 kg)
- Billed from: Russia (as Vladimir Petrov)
- Trained by: Road Warrior Hawk; Road Warrior Animal
- Debut: January 1987
- Retired: 1992

Alan Richard Blake (November 12, 1957 – July 27, 2024) was an American professional wrestler, better known by his ring name, Vladimir Petrov. Petrov wrestled in various North American promotions including Jim Crockett Promotions and the Universal Wrestling Federation, most notably as a member of The Russian Team and Paul Jones' Army with Ivan Koloff during the 1980s.

== Professional wrestling career ==
=== Jim Crockett Promotions ===
A former bouncer, Al Blake was brought into the Jim Crockett Promotions in January 1987 as Vladimir Petrov, "The Russian Assassin" after Krusher Khruschev had left for the World Wrestling Federation. Although then head booker Dusty Rhodes was to originally have brought in John Nord, he instead had Blake team with Koloff at the last minute. Introduced as a protégé of Ivan Koloff, he had been brought to the United States to help Ivan Koloff in his feud with Nikita Koloff after turning on Ivan Koloff's group.

Facing Nikita Koloff in a series of Russian Chain Matches, they eventually kayfabe injured Koloff's neck with the help of Dick Murdoch in April. They also had a series of matches with then-NWA World Tag Team Champions the Rock 'n' Roll Express, The Fabulous Freebirds and Jimmy & Ron Garvin. They would again lose to Ron Garvin & Barry Windham in a tournament for the vacant NWA US Tag Team titles and were eliminated in the opening round of the Jim Crockett Sr. Memorial Cup by Bob & Brad Armstrong.

=== Universal Wrestling Federation ===
Petrov also went to the Universal Wrestling Federation briefly to feud with "Dr. Death" Steve Williams over the UWF Title and also teamed with the Angel of Death (who later, under a mask, became another Russian Assassin) in a losing effort against the NWA World Tag Team champions The Rock 'n' Roll Express at the Superdome Extravaganza supercard on June 13, 1987.

Later during the year, he would wrestle single matches against Barry Windham and Todd Champion during the year before losing to Jim and Ron Garvin in a tag team match with The Barbarian at The Great American Bash on July 4, 1987.

Joining Paul Jones' Army with Ivan Koloff in late 1987, Petrov feuded with Ron Garvin although he would lose that feud too. As Vladimir Petrov, he helped Ivan Koloff defend the NWA United States Tag Team titles after Koloff's tag team partner Dick Murdoch was suspended in April.

=== World Wrestling Federation ===
In 1990, after his release, Blake began wrestling under his own name in the World Wrestling Federation. However, he was used mainly as a preliminary wrestler and left the following year retiring to Minnesota.

== Personal life and death ==
Blake was married to Karla Nelsen, who was fourth runner up for the NABBA Ms. Universe title in 1994 (losing because the judges felt she was "too muscular"). Together, they made female wrestling videos (starring Karla). Aside from training with his wife at the Twin Cities Gym in Roseville, Minnesota, Blake later resided in Pine City, Minnesota (an exurb of Minneapolis).

Blake died on July 27, 2024, at the age of 66.
