= Pat Rose =

American professional wrestler

Personal information
- Born: Patrick Rose; May 23, 1960 (age 66) Trenton, Georgia, U.S.

Professional wrestling career
- Ring name(s): Pat Rose; Pat Fargo; White Knight
- Billed height: 5 ft 10 in (1.78 m)
- Billed weight: 240 lb (110 kg; 17 st)
- Trained by: Ken Hawk
- Debut: 1979
- Retired: 1994

Pat Rose (born May 23, 1960) is an American retired professional wrestler, better known by his ring name, Pat Rose who worked in Southern promotions, Continental Wrestling Association and World Championship Wrestling.

== Professional wrestling career ==
Rose began his career in 1979 in Tennessee.

Early in his career he worked for Georgia Championship Wrestling.

In 1984 he teamed up with his cousin Randy Rose as the Rose Cousins winning the NWA Southeastern Tag Team Championship in Continental Wrestling Association in Tennessee.

During Rose's career he worked for Mid-South Wrestling, Jim Crockett Promotions and Championship Wrestling from Florida.

Rose worked for World Championship Wrestling from 1989 to 1994 working as a jobber to the stars.

Also Rose worked for the World Wrestling Federation from 1989 to 1992.

Rose worked for Smoky Mountain Wrestling from 1991 to 1994.

In 1994, Rose retired from wrestling.

== Personal life ==
Since Rose's retirement from wrestling, he hosts fishing tournaments.

In 2007, he was interviewed by WWE to their "Where Are They Now?" section of WWE.com.

In 2018, Rose and his cousin Randy Rose were inducted into the Alabama Professional Wrestling Hall Of Fame.

== Championships and accomplishments ==
- Southeastern Championship Wrestling
  - NWA Southeastern Tag Team Championship (2 times) - with Arn Anderson (1 time) and Randy Rose (1 time), ^{A}
- NWA Mid-America
  - NWA Mid-America Tag Team Championship with - Rocky Brewer (1 time)
