= Starrcade '88: True Gritt =

1988 World Championship Wrestling pay-per-view event

- VHS cover featuring Ric Flair and Lex Luger
- Promotion(s): National Wrestling Alliance; World Championship Wrestling
- Date: December 26, 1988
- City: Norfolk, Virginia
- Venue: Norfolk Scope
- Attendance: 10,000
- Buy rate: 150,000
- Tagline: True Gritt

Pay-per-view chronology
← Previous; The Great American Bash	Next → Chi-Town Rumble

Starrcade chronology
← Previous; 1987	Next → 1989

Starrcade '88: True Gritt was the sixth annual Starrcade professional wrestling pay-per-view (PPV) event produced under the National Wrestling Alliance (NWA) banner. It was the first Starrcade event produced by World Championship Wrestling (WCW), and took place on December 26, 1988, from the Norfolk Scope in Norfolk, Virginia. Shortly before the event, Ted Turner bought Jim Crockett Promotions (JCP), and the company became WCW.

The main event featured Ric Flair and Lex Luger for the NWA World Heavyweight Championship. They were once members of the Four Horsemen stable, but Luger left the group. Luger started a feud with Flair when Barry Windham, Luger's tag team partner, turned on him, and joined the Four Horsemen. Other matches included The Road Warriors against Sting and Dusty Rhodes for the NWA World Tag Team Championship, Barry Windham against Bam Bam Bigelow for the NWA United States Heavyweight Championship, and Mike Rotunda against Rick Steiner for the NWA World Television Championship. A 17-Man $50,000 Bunkhouse Battle Royal was won by the Junkyard Dog

== Storylines ==
The event featured wrestlers from pre-existing scripted feuds and storylines. Wrestlers portrayed villains and, heroes in the scripted events to build tension and lead to a wrestling match.

Ric Flair, the NWA World Heavyweight Champion, before his match at Starrcade

The main feud heading into Starrcade was between Ric Flair and Lex Luger over the NWA World Heavyweight Championship. In March 1987, Luger joined the Four Horsemen stable. Luger remained a member until early 1988, when Luger felt he was held back and quit the group. Luger then teamed with Barry Windham. Windham turned on Luger, however, and joined the Four Horsemen. Luger feuded with Flair, and they faced each other in several title matches, including at The Great American Bash, where the match was stopped due to Luger bleeding. Flair remained champion, and a rematch was made at Starrcade.

In late 1988, Jim Crockett Promotions, which originally produced Starrcade, was on the verge of bankruptcy. Ted Turner bought the company in November, and it became World Championship Wrestling. Previous Starrcade events were held on Thanksgiving, but moved to December to avoid direct competition with the WWF's Survivor Series. Future WCW Starrcades were also held in December. This was the last to be held in a traditional format until 1993. The following four Starrcades featured tournaments.

== Event ==
Other on-screen personnel
Role:	Name:
Presenters	Tony Schiavone
Presenters	Magnum T. A.
Commentator	Jim Ross
Commentator	Bob Caudle
Referee	Teddy Long
Referee	Tommy Young
Interviewer	Magnum T. A.
Ring announcer	Gary Michael Cappetta

The first match was between the team of The Varsity Club (Kevin Sullivan and Steve Williams) and The Fantastics (Bobby Fulton and Tommy Rogers) for the NWA United States Tag Team Championship. The match began with The Fantastics having the advantage. Sullivan and Williams fought back after Sullivan blocked a splash from Rogers with his knees. They dominated Rogers until Fulton tagged in and attacked both. After performing mounted punches to Williams, Fulton applied the sleeper hold. As Fulton ran at Williams, Williams dropped him on the top rope, and pinned him to win the match and the titles.

The second match was between The Original Midnight Express (Dennis Condrey and Randy Rose) (accompanied by Paul E. Dangerously) and The Midnight Express (Bobby Eaton and Stan Lane) (accompanied by Jim Cornette). The match started with Eaton and Lane dominating, and Cornette interfering using his tennis racket. This continued until Eaton missed a corner attack on Rose. Condrey and Rose attacked Eaton, and attempted a Rocket Launcher. Eaton avoided it, and Lane tagged in. Lane attacked both men and pinned Rose after a double-team to win the match. After the match, Condrey, Rose and Dangerously attacked Eaton, Lane and Cornette until Eaton fought them off with the racquet.

The third match was between The Russian Assassins (#1 and #2) (with Paul Jones) and the team of Ivan Koloff and The Junkyard Dog (replacing Nikita Koloff). The Junkyard Dog and Koloff had the early advantage. After a double clothesline to #1, The Junkyard Dog missed a falling headbutt. The Russian Assassins fought back with attacks until #2 missed a Russian Missile to The Junkyard Dog. The Junkyard Dog and Koloff had the advantage until #1 placed a foreign object in his mask. #1 performed a headbutt to Koloff, and pinned him to win the match.

The fourth match was between Rick Steiner and Mike Rotunda for the NWA World Television Championship. Kevin Sullivan, who accompanied Rotunda, was locked inside a cage. Rotunda had the advantage after Steiner hit the floor outside the ring, and Rotunda applied the chinlock. Steiner avoided a dropkick, and fought back with mounted punches. After Steiner performed a belly to belly suplex, Steve Williams rang the bell, confusing Steiner and the referee. Sullivan was released from the cage, and climbed on the apron. Steiner sent Rotunda into Sullivan, and pinned Rotunda to win the match and the title.

The fifth match was between Barry Windham and Bam Bam Bigelow for the NWA United States Heavyweight Championship. Bigelow had the advantage, and performed a slingshot splash. Bigelow then missed a splash, and Windham fought back. Windham applied the clawhold, and attempted a diving elbow drop. Bigelow avoided it, and fought back until Windham sent them both outside the ring with a crossbody block. Windham avoided an attack, and Bigelow ran into the ringpost. Windham returned to the ring, and Bigelow was counted out. Windham won the match, and retained the title.

The sixth match was between The Road Warriors (Hawk and Animal) (accompanied by Paul Ellering) and the team of Sting and Dusty Rhodes for the NWA World Tag Team Championship. The match went back and forth until Hawk repeatedly raked the eyes of Rhodes. Animal applied the neck vice on Rhodes, and Hawk applied the sleeper hold. Rhodes performed a jawbreaker, and Sting and Animal tagged in. Sting performed a Stinger splash, and attempted to apply the Scorpion Deathlock. Hawk attacked Sting, and attempted to double-team Rhodes with Animal. Rhodes fought out, and Sting performed a diving crossbody to Animal. As Sting attempted to pin Animal, Ellering interfered, and the Road Warriors were disqualified. Rhodes and Sting won the match, but the Road Warriors retained the title.

Lex Luger, who challenged Ric Flair for the NWA World Heavyweight Championship at Starrcade

In the main event for the NWA World Heavyweight Championship, Lex Luger gained the early advantage, and targeted the left arm of Ric Flair. Luger applied the hammerlock, and used the guard rail and ringpost. Flair fought back after avoiding an elbow drop, and sent Luger headfirst into the guard rail. Luger applied a sleeper hold, but Flair fought out with a belly to back suplex. Luger fought back with a superplex, and applied the figure four leglock. Luger continued to have the advantage until Flair hit Luger's left knee with a steel chair. Flair then targeted Luger's left leg, and applied the figure four leglock. Luger fought back with a gorilla press slam. After performing mounted punches and a scoop powerslam, Luger applied the Torture Rack. However, his knees buckled, and Flair fell on top of him. Flair then pinned Luger with his feet on the rope to win the match, and retain the title.

== Aftermath ==
After Starrcade, the feud between Ric Flair and Lex Luger ended. The Four Horsemen faction, down to two after Tully Blanchard and Arn Anderson went to the WWF in the summer of 1988, officially disbanded after James J. Dillon left for a front office job in the WWF, and Flair and Windham were managed by Hiro Matsuda. (In storyline, never seen on camera, Dillon sold the contracts of Flair and Windham to Matsuda). Flair and Windham feuded with Eddie Gilbert, resulting in Gilbert bringing in a mystery partner to wrestle in a tag team match on World Championship Wrestling. Gilbert's partner was revealed to be Ricky Steamboat, and Steamboat pinned Flair on television, rekindling their feud from several years earlier. They were presented as polar opposites, with Steamboat as a family man in contrast to Flair's persona. Steamboat won the title at Chi-Town Rumble, and had a series of rematches which ended when Flair regained the title at WrestleWar in a match considered among the greatest matches of all time. Luger defeated Barry Windham at Chi-Town Rumble to win the NWA United States Heavyweight Championship. Windham then returned to the WWF as "The Widowmaker".

After Starrcade, Dusty Rhodes, fired for blading on an episode of World Championship Wrestling, joined Steve Keirn and Mike Graham to revive the old Florida territory (called Professional Wrestling Federation) before joining the WWF in 1989. Announcer Tony Schiavone left WCW in February 1989 for the WWF, announcing for the weekly Wrestling Challenge program and calling PPVs before returning to WCW in 1990. Paul Jones left WCW after Starrcade and retired in 1991.

== Results ==
No.	Results	Stipulations	Times
1	The Varsity Club (Kevin Sullivan and Steve Williams) defeated The Fantastics (Bobby Fulton and Tommy Rogers) (c)	Tag team match for the NWA United States Tag Team Championship	15:50
2	The Midnight Express (Bobby Eaton and Stan Lane) (with Jim Cornette) defeated The Original Midnight Express (Dennis Condrey and Randy Rose) (with Paul E. Dangerously)	Tag team match	17:46
3	The Russian Assassins (#1 and #2) (with Paul Jones) defeated Junkyard Dog and Ivan Koloff	Tag team match	06:47
4	Rick Steiner defeated Mike Rotunda (c) (with Kevin Sullivan)	Singles match for the NWA World Television Championship	17:59
5	Barry Windham (c) (with J. J. Dillon) defeated Bam Bam Bigelow (with Oliver Humperdink) by countout	Singles match for the NWA United States Heavyweight Championship	16:17
6	Sting and Dusty Rhodes defeated The Road Warriors (Hawk and Animal) (c) (with Paul Ellering) by disqualification	Tag team match for the NWA World Tag Team Championship	11:20
7	Ric Flair (c) (with J. J. Dillon) defeated Lex Luger	Singles match for the NWA World Heavyweight Championship	30:59
8^{D}	Junkyard Dog won by last eliminating Abdullah the Butcher. (Note: Other participants were Commando Ray, Commando Boone, Eddie Gilbert, Dick Murdoch, Kendall Windham, Dustin Rhodes, Tommy Rogers, Bobby Fulton, Dennis Condrey, Randy Rose, Steve Williams, Bobby Eaton, Stan Lane, Larry Zbyszko, and Al Perez.)	17-Man $50,000 Bunkhouse Battle Royal	20:15
(c) / – the champion(s) heading into the match; D / – this was a dark match
