= Starrcade '90: Collision Course =

1990 World Championship Wrestling pay-per-view event

- Promotional poster featuring various WCW wrestlers
- Promotion(s): National Wrestling Alliance; World Championship Wrestling
- Date: December 16, 1990
- City: St. Louis, Missouri
- Venue: Kiel Auditorium
- Attendance: 7,200
- Buy rate: 165,000
- Tagline: Collision Course

Pay-per-view chronology
← Previous; Halloween Havoc	Next → WrestleWar

Starrcade chronology
← Previous; 1989	Next → 1991

Starrcade '90: Collision Course was the eighth annual Starrcade professional wrestling pay-per-view (PPV) event produced by World Championship Wrestling (WCW). It was the final under the National Wrestling Alliance (NWA) banner and the first under the World Championship Wrestling (WCW) banner. It took place on December 16, 1990, from the Kiel Auditorium in St. Louis, Missouri.

The main event was a steel cage match between Sting and The Black Scorpion for the NWA World Heavyweight Championship. Their feud began when The Black Scorpion debuted and began taunting Sting. Ric Flair was revealed to be The Black Scorpion at the end of the match, and Flair continued to feud with Sting after Starrcade.

Other matches included a street fight between Doom and the team of Arn Anderson and Barry Windham for the NWA World Tag Team Championship, a Texas Lariat Match between Stan Hansen and Lex Luger for the NWA United States Heavyweight Championship and the entire Pat O'Connor Memorial International Cup Tag Team Tournament.

== Storylines ==
The event featured wrestlers from pre-existing scripted feuds and storylines. Wrestlers portrayed villains, heroes, or less distinguishable characters in the scripted events that built tension and culminated in a wrestling match or series of matches.

The Black Scorpion before his match at Starrcade

The main feud heading into Starrcade was between Sting and The Black Scorpion. At The Great American Bash, Sting defeated Ric Flair to win the NWA World Heavyweight Championship. Since then, Sting engaged in feuds with Flair and Sid Vicious over the title. In August, a masked man named The Black Scorpion debuted and taunted Sting. His identity remained a secret, and it was only revealed that he was from Sting's past. To reveal the identity of The Black Scorpion, a steel cage match between Sting and The Black Scorpion was made where both the title and The Black Scorpion's mask would be defended.

On August 16, Pat O'Connor died. He was a former NWA World Heavyweight Champion, and was well known for his training and booking skills in the Kansas City territory. In honor of O'Connor, Starrcade held the Pat O'Connor Memorial International Cup Tag Team Tournament, a single-elimination tournament between eight tag teams, each representing a different country. The winner of the tournament was awarded a trophy.

== Event ==
The first match was between Bobby Eaton and "Z-Man" Tom Zenk. The match began with Z-Man having the advantage, and performing two reverse crossbodies. Eaton fought back by reversing the armbar into a wrist lock. Z-Man sent Eaton onto the entrance ramp with a suplex, and followed with a crossbody block to the outside. Eaton fought back with a bulldog and a diving leg drop. Z-Man performed a superkick, and attempted a missile dropkick, but Eaton avoided it, and pinned him with an inside cradle.

The four quarterfinal matches in the Pat O'Connor Memorial International Cup Tag Team Tournament then occurred. The first was between the team of Sgt. Krueger and Col. DeKlerk (South Africa) and the Steiner Brothers (Rick Steiner and Scott Steiner) (USA). The match started back and forth, with Rick performing Steiner-Lines to Krueger and DeKlerk. DeKlerk sent Rick outside the ring, and performed a slingshot senton, but Rick caught him. After DeKlerk missed a clothesline, Scott tagged in. Scott pinned DeKlerk after a Frankensteiner to win the match.

Other on-screen personnel
Role:	Name:
Commentators	Jim Ross
Commentators	Paul E. Dangerously
Interviewers	Tony Schiavone
Interviewers	Missy Hyatt
Referees	Randy Anderson
Referees	Masao "Tiger" Hattori (for the Pat O'Connor Finals)
Referees	Nick Patrick
Referees	Lee Scott
Referees	Dick the Bruiser (For the Sting-Scorpion Cage Match)
Ring announcer	Gary Michael Cappetta
Ring announcer	Mickey Garagiola (for the Taylor-Wallstreet match)

The second quarterfinal was between the team of Norman Smiley and Chris Adams (United Kingdom) and the team of Rey Misterio and Konan (Mexico). The match began with Smiley and Adams having the advantage. Konan performed a springboard arm drag and a headscissors takedown to Smiley, but Smiley fought back with a fisherman suplex. Konan and Misterio performed a double back elbow to Adams and a double back body drop to Smiley. Konan then pinned Smiley after a super inverted vertical suplex to win the match.

The third quarterfinal was between The Royal Family (Rip Morgan and Jack Victory) (New Zealand) and the team of Mr. Saito and The Great Muta (Japan). The match started with The Great Muta and Saito having the advantage. Morgan fought back with a belly to back suplex to Saito, and threw him outside, where Victory attacked him. After The Great Muta and Victory tagged in, The Great Muta performed a handspring back elbow, and all four came in. Morgan accidentally performed a clothesline to Victory, and The Great Muta pinned Victory with a bridging German suplex.

The fourth quarterfinal was between the team of Troy Montour and Danny Johnson (Canada) and the team of Victor Zangiev and Salman Hashimikov (Soviet Union). The match started with Zangiev applying a back stretching hold on Johnson. Zangiev performed a belly to belly suplex, dropping Johnson on his head, but Johnson fought back with a double chop. Hashimikov and Montour tagged in, and after several collar-and-elbow tie-ups, Hashimikov performed a belly to belly suplex, and pinned Montour to win the match.

The sixth match of the event was between Terry Taylor and Michael Wallstreet. Taylor had the early advantage, and applied the side headlock. Wallstreet fought back, and applied the abdominal stretch with the use of the ropes for leverage. Taylor fought back, and performed a belly to back suplex and a Five Arm. Wallstreet fought back with a flapjack onto the top rope, and pinned Taylor after a Stock Market Crash to win the match.

The seventh match was between the team of Big Cat and The Motor City Madman and The Skyscrapers (Sid Vicious and Danny Spivey). The match started with all four fighting in the ring. Spivey threw The Motor City Madman outside the ring, and The Skyscrapers double-teamed Big Cat. The Motor City Madman tagged in, and The Skyscrapers sent him into the corner. Vicious performed a flying shoulder block, and Spivey followed with a corner clothesline. The Skyscrapers then performed a double powerbomb, and Vicious pinned The Motor City Madman to win the match.

The eighth match was between the team of Tommy Rich and Ricky Morton (accompanied by Robert Gibson) and The Fabulous Freebirds (Jimmy Garvin and Michael Hayes) (accompanied by Little Richard Marley). Morton and Rich had the early advantage. Morton sent Hayes outside the ring, where Gibson attacked him, and Morton sent him into the ringpost. Morton applied the figure four leglock on Hayes as Rich applied the figure four leglock on Garvin. Morton and Rich had the advantage until Hayes performed a bulldog to Morton. Rich and Garvin fought as Marley was about to attack Morton's knee from the top turnbuckle. Gibson hit Marley with his crutch, and Marley fell on Garvin. Morton then pinned Garvin with a roll-up to win the match. After the match, the Fabulous Freebirds attacked Marley and Gibson.

The two semifinal matches of the tournament then occurred. The first was between the team of Konan and Rey Misterio and the Steiner Brothers. Rick and Konan exchanged holds until Scott tagged in. Scott performed a scoop powerslam, and Rick performed a diving bulldog. Misterio tagged in, and Scott performed a fallaway slam. Rick tagged in, and Misterio performed shoulder blocks. He then jumped onto Rick's shoulders, and Rick performed a powerbomb. Rick then pinned Misterio to win the match.

The second semifinal was between the team of Victor Zangiev and Salman Hashimikov and the team of Mr. Saito and The Great Muta. Hashimikov applied the Boston crab on Saito. Zangiev tagged in, and Saito applied the sharpshooter. Hashimikov and The Great Muta tagged in, and Hashimikov performed a belly to belly suplex and an over the shoulder back-to-belly piledriver. Saito and Zangiev tagged in, and Saito performed a clothesline. Saito then pinned Zangiev after a Saito suplex to win the match.

The eleventh match of the event was a Texas Lariat match between Lex Luger and Stan Hansen for the NWA United States Heavyweight Championship. The match started back and forth until they fought outside the ring, and Hansen gained the advantage with the use of the guard rail and a steel chair. Hansen performed a belly to back suplex, and hung Luger with the rope over the top rope. Luger fought back, and pulled Hansen into the ringpost. After performing leg drops, Luger touched three of the turnbuckles. Both Hansen and Luger pulled the rope, and Luger was sent into the fourth turnbuckle. He also knocked down the referee, and Hansen attacked Luger with his boot. A replacement referee came down, and Hansen touched all four turnbuckles. Hansen was declared the winner, but the original referee revived and declared Luger the winner of the match and the title.

The twelfth match was a Street Fight between the team of Arn Anderson and Barry Windham and Doom (Ron Simmons and Butch Reed) for the NWA World Tag Team Championship. Windham was a last-minute replacement for Ric Flair, who defeated Butch Reed back in November at the Clash of the Champions XIII to earn a title rematch for him and Anderson. The match started back and forth with the use of belts and steel chairs. Anderson and Windham had the advantage until Simmons fought back with a spinebuster to Windham, and Reed attacked Anderson with a chair. The match went back and forth with Windham performed a superplex to Simmons and a DDT to Reed. Simmons used a chair on Anderson, and Reed performed a piledriver to Windham. Windham sent Reed outside, and he attempted to double-team Simmons with Anderson. Reed attacked Windham, and Simmons performed a clothesline to Anderson, who jumped off the top turnbuckle. Windham pinned Reed with an inside cradle as Simmons pinned Anderson. The match ended in a draw, and Doom retained the title. After the match, they continued to fight.

The thirteenth match was the final of the tournament between the team of Mr. Saito and The Great Muta and the Steiner Brothers. The match started back and forth until The Great Muta threw Rick outside the ring, and Saito and The Great Muta attacked him with the ringbell and ringpost. They had the advantage until Rick avoided a kick from The Great Muta, and performed a Steiner-Line. Scott tagged in, and performed a double underhook powerbomb. Saito tagged in, and performed a Saito suplex and an aided piledriver with The Great Muta. Saito dominated Scott until Rick tagged in, undetected by Saito. Saito applied the sleeper hold on Scott, and Rick performed a sunset flip from the top turnbuckle, pinning Saito to win the match and the tournament.

Sting, the NWA World Heavyweight Champion, at Starrcade

The main event was a steel cage match between The Black Scorpion and Sting and for the NWA World Heavyweight Championship with Dick the Bruiser as special guest referee. If The Black Scorpion lost, he would have to unmask. Four masked wrestlers (Moondog Rex, Colonel DeKlerk, Angel Of Death and "Wild" Bill Irwin), whom the real Black Scorpion called "messengers", came out dressed as the Black Scorpion. Then the actual Black Scorpion made his entrance through what Jim Ross described as "a spaceship". The match started back and forth until The Black Scorpion performed a gutwrench suplex, and applied the figure four necklock. After an inverted atomic drop and a corner clothesline, The Black Scorpion applied the chinlock. Sting fought back with a gorilla press slam, and sent The Black Scorpion into the cage. The Black Scorpion fought back with an eye rake, and sent Sting into the cage. Sting performed a one-handed bulldog, a Stinger splash before he applied the Scorpion Deathlock. Sting removed The Black Scorpion's mask, but another was underneath it. Sting sent The Black Scorpion into the cage, and performed a flying clothesline. Sting then pinned The Black Scorpion after a diving crossbody to win the match, and retain the title. After the match, the other Black Scorpions charged the ring, and Sting and Dick the Bruiser defended themselves by attacking and unmasking each, until Arn Anderson and Barry Windham attacked Sting with a chair, and Anderson performed a DDT. The Black Scorpion attacked Sting with the chair as wrestlers came down to help Sting. Sting fought off The Black Scorpion, and unmasked him, revealing him to be Ric Flair, which also explained why Windham took Flair's place in the World Tag Team title match.

== Reception ==
In a reader's poll in the January 8, 1991 edition of the Wrestling Observer Newsletter, 234 out of 447 fans that responded gave the show a thumbs up. 176 gave it a thumbs down, with the remaining 37 giving it a thumbs in the middle reaction. The match between Doom and Arn Anderson and Barry Windham received the most votes for the night's best match, with 238 votes, while the match between the teams of Hasimikov and Zangiev and Johnson and Montour received the most votes for the worst match of the night with 116.

== Aftermath ==
Sting and Ric Flair continued their feud, and Flair defeated Sting to win the NWA World Heavyweight Championship for the seventh time on January 11. At that time, the title belt was extended to also represent the newly created WCW World Heavyweight Championship, and Flair became the first WCW World Heavyweight Champion. Their feud continued with a WarGames match at WrestleWar between the Four Horsemen and the team of Sting, the Steiner Brothers and Brian Pillman. The Four Horsemen won the match, and Sting's feud with them ended. Sting went on to feud with Nikita Koloff while Flair left World Championship Wrestling in the summer of 1991 due to disputes with its president, Jim Herd, and joined the World Wrestling Federation (WWF). After this event, all secondary titles in WCW (United States Heavyweight Championship, World Tag Team Championship, United States Tag Team Championship, World Television Championship) were changed from NWA titles to WCW as WCW separated itself from the NWA. Ricky Morton and Tommy Rich would turn heel in early 1991 and join the York Foundation as Richard Morton and Thomas Rich, respectively, along with the returning Terry Taylor, who left the WWF and his Red Rooster character to become heel Terrance Taylor.

== Home media and streaming ==
The event was released on home video in the United States and the United Kingdom by Turner Home Entertainment. In the UK, it was released in the summer of 1992 and was edited down to two hours, with the Terry Taylor vs. Michael Wallstreet cut from the release.

In 2014, the event was included on the WWE's streaming platform the WWE Network as part of its launch and remained on the service until the platform closed in 2026. As of September 2026, the event is no longer available to stream and has not been added to any of the streaming platforms that the WWE has agreements with.

== Results ==
No.	Results	Stipulations	Times
1	Bobby Eaton defeated "Z-Man" Tom Zenk	Singles match	08:45
2	The Steiner Brothers (Rick Steiner and Scott Steiner) defeated Sgt. Krueger and Colonel DeKlerk	Tournament quarterfinal	02:12
3	Rey Misterio and Konan defeated Norman Smiley and Chris Adams	Tournament quarterfinal	05:29
4	Mr. Saito and The Great Muta defeated the Royal Family (Rip Morgan and Jack Victory)	Tournament quarterfinal	05:41
5	Victor Zangiev and Salman Hashimikov defeated Troy Montour and Danny Johnson	Tournament quarterfinal	03:54
6	Michael Wallstreet (with Alexandra York) defeated Terry Taylor	Singles match	06:52
7	The Skyscrapers (Sid Vicious and Danny Spivey) defeated Big Cat and the Motor City Madman	Tag team match	01:01
8	Tommy Rich and Ricky Morton (with Robert Gibson) defeated the Fabulous Freebirds (Michael Hayes and Jimmy Garvin) (with Little Richard Marley)	Tag team match	06:13
9	The Steiner Brothers (Rick Steiner and Scott Steiner) defeated Rey Misterio and Konan	Tournament semifinal	02:51
10	Mr. Saito and The Great Muta defeated Victor Zangiev and Salman Hashimikov	Tournament semifinal	03:08
11	Lex Luger defeated Stan Hansen (c)	Texas Lariat match for the NWA United States Heavyweight Championship	10:13
12	Doom (Ron Simmons and Butch Reed) (c) (with Teddy Long) vs. The Horsemen (Arn Anderson and Barry Windham) ended in a draw.	Street fight for the NWA World Tag Team Championship	07:19
13	The Steiner Brothers (Rick Steiner and Scott Steiner) defeated the Great Muta and Mr. Saito	Tournament final	10:52
14	Sting (c) defeated The Black Scorpion	Steel cage match for the NWA World Heavyweight Championship with Dick the Bruiser as special guest referee	18:31
(c) / – the champion(s) heading into the match

=== Tournament bracket ===
Quarterfinals
1	(United States) The Steiner Brothers	Pin
8	(South Africa) Krueger / DeKlerk	2:12
4	(Mexico) Konan / Misterio	Pin
5	(United Kingdom) Adams / Smiley	5:29
2	(Soviet Union) Zangiev / Hashimikov	Pin
7	(Canada) Johnson / Montour	3:54
3	(New Zealand) Morgan / Victory	Pin
6	(Japan) Saito / Muta	5:41

Semifinals
1	(United States) Steiner Brothers	Pin
5	(Mexico) Konan / Misterio	2:51
3	(Soviet Union) Zangiev / Hashimikov	Pin
2	(Japan) Saito / Muta	3:08

Finals
1	(United States) Steiner Brothers	Pin
2	(Japan) Saito / Muta	10:52

== See also ==
- 1990 in professional wrestling
