= Rocky King =

American professional wrestler and referee (1958–2022)

Personal information
- Born: William Boulware Jr. January 30, 1958 Richburg, South Carolina, U.S.
- Died: March 27, 2022 (aged 64)

Professional wrestling career
- Ring name(s): Little Richard Marley; Rocky King; Rocky Smith
- Billed height: 6 ft 1 in (1.85 m)
- Billed weight: 220 lb (100 kg; 16 st)
- Debut: 1984
- Retired: 1998

William Boulware Jr., (January 30, 1958 – March 27, 2022) better known by his ring name, Rocky King, was an American professional wrestler and referee in Jim Crockett Promotions and World Championship Wrestling.

== Professional wrestling career ==
=== Beginnings ===
Boulware was homeless before he began his wrestling career. He was hired by Jim Crockett Jr. after he would hang around the wrestlers trying to get a job. Boulware, using the ring name Rocky King, started wrestling in 1984 in Mid South Wrestling, making his debut on Mid South television on August 1, 1984 in a match against Hercules Hernandez.

=== Mid Atlantic Championship Wrestling (1984) ===
King next appeared for the National Wrestling Alliance's Jim Crockett Promotions (Mid Atlantic Championship Wrestling) in North Carolina. He began his career in the promotion as a jobber, making his first appearance on August 13, 1984 in a televised loss to Wahoo McDaniel. He quickly improved and was often allowed a lot of offense during his matches, and scored his first victory on October 2, 1984 at a house show in Spartanburg, SC when he defeated Nikita Koloff via disqualification. King appeared numerous times on JCP television events, and was a frequent opponent of the Four Horsemen.

=== Championship Wrestling from Florida (1984–1985) ===
King then traveled to NWA affiliate Championship Wrestling from Florida, making his first appearance on November 28, 1984 on CWF television when he teamed with Mike Allen to lose to Jim Neidhart & Krusher Kruschev. Later that night he teamed with Brian Blair and defeated Neidhart & Kruschev. On December 12, Rocky faced NWA Florida Heavyweight Champion Jesse Barr but was defeated. The same result was in play at an event on December 26. The rookie wrestler faced numerous opponents as the winter progressed, falling to Bill Irwin, The Missing Link, King Cobra and Sweet Sugar Brown before he gained his first ever pinfall win when he defeated Jack Hart (Barry Horowitz) on February 15, 1985 in Gainesville, FL. His final match with CWF came on March 8, 1985 when he was defeated by Dale Veasey.

=== American Wrestling Alliance (1984–1985) ===
While competing in the CWF, King traveled to Verne Gagne's American Wrestling Association and was defeated by Jimmy Garvin in a televised event on December 23, 1984. King would go on to face Billy Robinson later in the year, as well as The Road Warriors in tag-team action.

=== National Wrestling Alliance (1985–1988) ===
"[King] was just a fun loving, happy guy with an infectious personality. All the boys loved him and also had great respect for his work. He was a jobber that earned his way up the ranks, so much so, the office was putting him over in some house shows and I worked him several times putting him over. He was a fan favorite amongst our talent level. One of the good guys. He will be missed"

— Former NWA wrestler Tommy Angel on working with King

Rocky would also simultaneously wrestle for JCP, making his comeback at a house show on March 12, 1985 against The Golden Terror. Four days later at SilverStarr 85 (a closed circuit event in Greensboro, NC), he competed against Arn Anderson but was defeated. On March 30 he fought Sam Houston to a time limit draw, and followed that with subsequent draws against Gene Ligon and Joel Deaton in the days to come. After a string of televised losees, King secured his first JCP victory on April 19, 1985 in Lenoir, NC when he defeated Joel Deaton. He followed it the same night by defeated manager James J Dillon.

King formed a tag-team with Gene Ligon and competed on Crockett television; on the April 27, 1985 editionh of NWA Worldwide the duo were defeated by Superstar Billy Graham & The Barbarian. On May 4, King faced NWA World Heavyweight Champion Ric Flair but was defeated. The rookie wrestler rebounded to defeat The Golden Terror. As the year progressed he faced Tommy Lane, Bob Roop, and United States Heavyweight Champion Tully Blanchard.

In September 1985 he was involved with an angle that saw King attacked by The Midnight Express and Jim Cornette that led to Jimmy Valiant coming to his rescue. King and Valiant then formed a tag-team; on September 21, 1985 the duo defeated George South & Jim Jeffers on NWA Worldwide. On October 7, 1985 he secured the most significant victory yet of his career when he teamed with Valiant to defeat The Midnight Express (Bobby Eaton & Dennis Condrey) at a house show in Greenville, SC. This match - the start of their house show series - was the only victory as the Express were dominant in subsequent rematches.

On November 28, 1985, Rocky King challenged for the NWA Junior Heavyweight Champion Denny Brown in a dark match at Starrcade 85 but was unsuccessful. On December 11 he received another shot at NWA Champion Ric Flair but was defeated. Ten days later King faced Flair again; this time after The Nature Boy was victorious via submission he shook King's hand.

In January 1986 he formed a new team, this time tagging with Pez Whatley. The duo would face The Midnight Express as well as Ivan Koloff & Nikita Koloff and The Four Horsemen (Arn Anderson & Tully Blanchard) in matches in the winter and spring. Whatley would ultimately turn heel and join the stable of Paul Jones, the two former partners faced off on the April 5th episode of NWA Worldwide with Whatley coming out victorious. On May 24, he teamed with NWA Jr. Heavyweight Champion Denny Brown in an unsuccessful challenge to NWA World Tag-Team Champions The Midnight Express. King then continued to wrestle in the undercard, facing "Mr Electricity" Steve Regal, Thunderfoot, Rocky Kernodle, Denny Brown, Ivan Koloff, Buddy Landell, and others. During the fall of 1986, King would form a team with George South. and would face the Midnight Express and the Four Horsemen, amongst others.

On January 17, 1987 King mounted an unsuccessful challenge to Lex Luger. On January 30, NWA Television Champion Tully Blanchard put his championship and ten thousand dollars on the line against King and was victorious via pinfall. On February 23 the duo of King and South gained their first victory when they defeated The Mulkey Brothers at a house show in Greenville, SC. South & King then challenged NWA World Tag-Team Champions Rick Rude & Manny Fernandez, then faced to The New Breed.

On April 10, 1987, Rocky King teamed with Bobby Jaggers to enter the Jim Crockett Sr. Memorial Cup 1987 tournament. The new duo however was defeated by The Thunderfoots in the first round. On May 2, 1987 King was defeated by NWA Junior Heavyweight Champion Lazertron on NWA Pro. After several more televised losses, King rebounded to defeat Thunderfoot 2 on the July 11th edition of NWA Pro, and then beat Thunderfoot 1 at a house show the following day. As the second half of the year continued he would face The Barbarian, Ivan Koloff, Colt Steele, Teijo Khan, Kevin Sullivan, and others.

Rocky King temporarily diverted to another National Wrestling Alliance affiliate run under promoter Pez Whatley. in January 1988, making his debut at a house show in Fisherville, Virginia against Chris Champion. King would go on to wrestle Rick Steiner and Pez Whatley during his time in the promotion.

However, King continued to make appearances for JCP; on NWA Pro on February 6, 1988 the duo of King and South faced The Powers of Pain. A week later on World Championship Wrestling he was defeated by NWA World Television Champion Mike Rotundo. On NWA Pro on April 30, South & King again faced Arn Anderson & Tully Blanchard but were once more defeated. King's final match for Jim Crockett Promotions came at a house show on June 9, 1988 when he teamed with Bugsy McGraw to defeat Tiger Conway Jr. and Tony Suber in Dunn, NC.

=== World Championship Wrestling (1990–1998) ===
Rocky King returned to the promotion after it was bought by Ted Turner and gradually transformed into World Championship Wrestling. It was in the midst of this transition that King appeared on April 20, 1990, teaming with Brad Anderson in a loss to The Wild Samoans at a house show in Augusta, GA. He returned to television three days later on NWA Main Event, teaming with Lee Scott in a handicap match against Mean Mark (the future Undertaker).

On May 29 he faced NWA Television Champion Arn Anderson on World Championship Wrestling; King won via disqualification when he was attached by Sid Vicious, Barry Windham, and Ole Anderson. He thus became loosely associated with the Dudes With Attitudes during their feud with the Four Horsemen. On the June 23rd episode of World Championship Wrestling, King teamed with Paul Orndorff & The Junkyard Dog to defeat NWA World Champion Ric Flair, NWA Television Champion Arn Anderson and Barry Windham via disqualification.

In late 1990, King got a gimmick change and became Little Richard Marley, manager of Michael Hayes and Jimmy Garvin, the Fabulous Freebirds. He helped them in their feud with the Southern Boys for a couple of months. At Starrcade in 1990, he inadvertently cost the Freebirds their match against Tommy Rich and Ricky Morton. After the match, the Freebirds attacked him. He then went back to wrestling as Rocky King. King became a WCW referee before retiring in 1998, although he did wrestle a final time in a loss to Super Calo on WCW Pro on August 17, 1997.

=== Later career (1999–2011) ===
In July 1999, he started BWA Professional Wrestling to give fans a family-oriented product on the independent scene. He also formed Boulware Enterprises, Inc. to run his promotion Boulware Wrestling Association. The BWA ran shows for churches, non-profit organizations and private organizations on the east coast. He partnered with Bill Heard III of Bill Heard Chevrolet in Atlanta, Georgia to operate Kids Nite Out, a program to keep kids off the streets. King also partnered with Frank Aldridge's World Wrestling Alliance 4 - WWA4, and together they ran hundreds of wrestling shows every year.

On November 19, 2005 he defeated George South at the CCW A Tribute to Starrcade show in Spartanburg, SC. On December 9, 2011 he defeated Joe Etell at the Fighting Spirit Wrestling Immortal Holiday event.

== Death ==
Boulware died on March 27, 2022, aged 64 from health issues.
