= Chi-Town Rumble =

1989 World Championship Wrestling pay-per-view event

- VHS cover featuring Animal and Lex Luger
- Promotion(s): National Wrestling Alliance; World Championship Wrestling
- Date: February 20, 1989
- City: Chicago, Illinois
- Venue: UIC Pavilion
- Attendance: 8,000
- Buy rate: 130,000

Pay-per-view chronology
← Previous; Starrcade	Next → WrestleWar

Chi-Town Rumble was a professional wrestling pay-per-view (PPV) event produced by World Championship Wrestling (WCW) under the National Wrestling Alliance (NWA) banner. It took place on February 20, 1989, at the UIC Pavilion in Chicago, Illinois.

The main event was a standard wrestling match for the NWA World Heavyweight Championship, in which Ric Flair defended the title against Ricky Steamboat. Steamboat won the match—and the championship—by pinning Flair with a small package.

Featured matches on the undercard were The Road Warriors (Hawk and Animal) versus The Varsity Club (Steve Williams and Kevin Sullivan) for the NWA World Tag Team Championship, Lex Luger versus Barry Windham for the NWA United States Heavyweight Championship, Mike Rotunda versus Rick Steiner for the NWA World Television Championship, Midnight Express (Bobby Eaton and Stan Lane) and Jim Cornette versus Original Midnight Express (Jack Victory and Randy Rose) and Paul E. Dangerously in a Loser Leaves NWA match, Sting versus Butch Reed and Michael Hayes versus Russian Assassin #1.

== Storylines ==
Chi-Town Rumble featured seven professional wrestling matches that involved wrestlers from pre-existing rivalries, plots and storylines that were played out on World Wide Wrestling, Pro and World Championship Wrestling–WCW's television programs. Wrestlers portrayed a hero, villain or a tweener as they followed a series of events that built tension, and culminated in a wrestling match or a series of matches.

The main rivalry heading into the event was between Ric Flair and Ricky Steamboat for the NWA World Heavyweight Championship. At Starrcade, Flair defeated Lex Luger to retain the title. On the January 21 edition of World Championship Wrestling, Steamboat returned to WCW as Eddie Gilbert's surprise partner against Flair and Barry Windham in a tag team match. Steamboat pinned Flair to win the match and demanded a shot against Flair for the NWA World Heavyweight Championship. On January 28 edition of World Championship Wrestling, it was announced that Flair would defend the title against Steamboat at Chi-Town Rumble.

The main tag team rivalry heading into the event was between The Road Warriors (Hawk and Animal) and The Varsity Club (Steve Williams and Kevin Sullivan) for the NWA World Tag Team Championship. At Starrcade, Varsity Club defeated The Fantastics (Bobby Fulton and Tommy Rogers) to win the NWA United States Tag Team Championship. Later that night, Road Warriors retained the NWA World Tag Team Championship against Sting and Dusty Rhodes by intentional disqualification. On January 14 edition of World Championship Wrestling, Sullivan and Williams challenged Road Warriors to a match for the World Tag Team title. On January 28 edition of World Championship Wrestling, it was announced that Road Warriors would defend the title against Sullivan and Williams at Chi-Town Rumble.

Another tag team rivalry heading into the event was between Midnight Express (Bobby Eaton and Stan Lane) and Original Midnight Express (Dennis Condrey and Randy Rose). At Starrcade, Eaton and Lane defeated Condrey and Rose in a tag team match. The rivalry expanded to involve their managers Jim Cornette and Paul E. Dangerously respectively. On January 14 edition of World Championship Wrestling, Dangerously announced that he would force Cornette out of NWA. On January 28 edition of World Championship Wrestling, it was announced that a Six-man Loser Leaves NWA match would take place pitting Midnight Express and Cornette against Original Midnight Express and Dangerously. A secondary rivalry heading into the event was between Barry Windham and Lex Luger for the NWA United States Heavyweight Championship. At Starrcade, Windham defeated Bam Bam Bigelow to retain the US title. Later that night, Luger was defeated by Ric Flair in a title shot for the NWA World Heavyweight Championship. Windham and Luger's rivalry dated back to April 23 edition of World Championship Wrestling in 1988, when Windham turned on Luger during a NWA World Tag Team Championship title defense against Arn Anderson and Tully Blanchard and joined Four Horsemen. On January 28 edition of World Championship Wrestling, it was announced that Windham would defend the United States title against Luger at Chi-Town Rumble.

Another secondary rivalry heading into the event was between Rick Steiner and Mike Rotunda for the NWA World Television Championship. At Starrcade, Steiner defeated Rotunda to win the Television title. On January 14 edition of World Championship Wrestling, Steiner defeated Rotunda to retain the title in a rematch when Steve Williams caused the disqualification by attacking Steiner. On January 21 edition of World Championship Wrestling, Rotunda expressed about his quest to regain the title. On January 28 edition of World Championship Wrestling, it was announced that Steiner would defend the TV title against Rotunda at Chi-Town Rumble.

== Event ==
Other on-screen personnel
Role:	Name:
Commentators	Jim Ross
Commentators	Magnum T. A.
Referees	Teddy Long
Referees	Tommy Young
Interviewer	Bob Caudle
Ring announcer	Gary Michael Cappetta

=== Preliminary matches ===
As the event aired live on pay-per-view, the first match to take place was between Michael Hayes and Russian Assassin #1. Assassin delivered a series of Jumping Lariats called Russian Sickle to Hayes. Hayes made comebacks during the match but Assassin dominated him. Assassin's manager Paul Jones interfered in the match by attacking Hayes. Assassin tried to attack Hayes in the corner but Hayes countered it and tried to perform a bulldog but Assassin pushed him to the mat. Assassin tried to deliver a suplex but Hayes countered it. Hayes avoided a corner clothesline by Assassin and delivered him mounted punches in the corner. Hayes followed with a DDT to win the match.

The next match was between Sting and Butch Reed. Sting dominated Reed in the earlier part of the match. Reed gained momentum in the match with the help of his manager Hiro Matsuda. Reed applied a chinlock and began using dirty tactics. Sting tossed Reed into the corner and tried to perform a corner splash, which he called Stinger Splash but Reed avoided it. Reed tried to perform a Corner Clothesline but fell out to the floor. Sting delivered a vertical suplex to Reed and tried to pin him but got a near-fall as Matsuda pulled Sting out of the ring. Reed took advantage and pulled Sting in the ring to perform a swinging neckbreaker. He applied another chinlock. Sting countered with a Jawbreaker. Sting performed a diving elbow drop. Reed threw Sting out of the ring and stomped him on the apron. Sting managed to deliver a shoulder block and tried to perform a sunset flip but Reed fell on Sting and held the ropes for the pinfall. The referee Teddy Long pulled Reed from the ropes, causing Sting to pin Reed with the Sunset Flip for the win.

The third match was a Loser Leaves NWA match pitting the Midnight Express (Bobby Eaton and Stan Lane) and their manager Jim Cornette against Original Midnight Express (Dennis Condrey and Randy Rose) and their manager Paul E. Dangerously. Condrey left NWA just before the event and was replaced by Jack Victory. Lane and Rose started the match. The match went back and forth with both teams exchanging momentum. Dangerously was eventually tagged into the match. Dangerously tagged in Rose after a few attacks. Rose was tagged in. Dangerously distracted Cornette, allowing Rose to attack Cornette. He tagged in Dangerously, allowing Cornette and Dangerously to battle each other for the first time in the match. The match continued until miscommunication occurred between Original Midnight Express. Cornette tripped Dangerously outside the ring while Eaton and Lane delivered a double flapjack to Rose, enabling Lane to pin him and win the match for the Midnight Express.

The next match that occurred was between Rick Steiner and Mike Rotunda for the NWA World Television Championship. Steiner's younger brother Scott Steiner made his NWA debut at the event and appeared at ringside with Rick to manage him. Steiner and Rotunda exchanged submission maneuvers on each other. Rotunda offered Steiner a handshake but Steiner did not shake hands with him. Rotunda applied an abdominal stretch and cheated near the ropes. Steiner countered the hold with an Oklahoma roll but was in the ropes. Rotunda gained momentum and attacked Steiner in the corner with his shoulder. Steiner performed a scoop powerslam to Rotunda. Steiner was about to win the match until Kevin Sullivan distracted Steiner by talking about his dog Spike. Rotunda took advantage and delivered a back suplex to Steiner. Rotunda missed a dropkick on Steiner and received Mounted Punches in the corner by Steiner. Steiner applied a sleeper hold on Rotunda. Rotunda's back fell on Steiner and Steiner's shoulders were pinned. As a result, Rotunda won the title.

=== Main event matches ===
The fifth match pitted Barry Windham defending the NWA United States Heavyweight Championship against Lex Luger. Luger dominated Windham for much of the earlier part of the match by performing his power moves, the then action spilled to the ringside. The two returned with Windham delivering a Suplex to Luger to gain the advantage. The two outside the ring where Windham attacked Luger on the guardrail. Windham tried to punch Luger into the ringpost but Luger avoided it and Windham injured his hand. It became trouble for Windham as he was unable to use his hurt hand. He managed to apply a clawhold on Luger but Luger escaped the hold. Windham then delivered a superplex from the top rope and tried to pin Luger's shoulders to the mat. Luger reversed the pin into one of his own and got the three count. As a result, Luger won the title.

The final match on the undercard was a tag team match between The Road Warriors (Hawk and Animal) and The Varsity Club ("Dr. Death" Steve Williams and Kevin Sullivan) for the NWA World Tag Team Championship. Sullivan and Williams' NWA United States Tag Team Championship was not on the line, despite being the champions. Animal and Williams started the match. Hawk and Animal dominated Williams in the beginning, before Williams eventually tagged in Sullivan. Sullivan and Williams double-teamed Animal to gain control of the match. Hawk and Williams started battling each other outside the ring and the referee was distracted by their fight. This allowed Sullivan to perform a chair shot on Animal. Sullivan and Williams continued to dominate Animal, before Hawk was tagged in. The Road Warriors tried to perform a Doomsday Device, but Williams broke it up. Animal fought Williams while Hawk performed a Flying Clothesline on Sullivan to win the match and retain the titles.

The main event featured Ric Flair defending the NWA World Heavyweight Championship against Ricky Steamboat. Steamboat got the early momentum until Flair began attacking Steamboat. Flair performed a Jumping Knee Drop on Steamboat. Steamboat whipped Flair and Flair did a Flair Flip onto the apron. He climbed the top rope and delivered a diving crossbody to Steamboat but Steamboat countered it into a pinfall. Flair delivered an inverted atomic drop to Steamboat and followed a Figure Four Leglock. Flair began attacking Steamboat's knee. Steamboat eventually gained momentum by performing a clothesline. Steamboat tried to deliver a diving crossbody on Flair but the referee was hit as well. Steamboat tried to wake up the referee. Flair took advantage and tried to pin Steamboat with a roll-up. Flair tossed Steamboat over the top rope and Steamboat climbed the top rope to perform a Diving Crossbody but Flair moved out of the way. Teddy Long came in as the replacement referee. Flair tried to apply a Figure Four Leglock on Steamboat but Steamboat countered it with a small package to pin Flair to win the title.

== Aftermath ==
Ricky Steamboat and Ric Flair continued their rivalry for the NWA World Heavyweight Championship at Chi-Town Rumble. On April 2 Clash of the Champions VI: Ragin' Cajun, Steamboat defeated Flair in a two out of three falls match to retain the title. However, Flair's foot was on the bottom rope during the ending of the third fall. As a result, it was announced on April 9 edition of Main Event that a rematch would take place between the two for the title. At WrestleWar, Flair defeated Steamboat to win the title.

After winning the NWA United States Heavyweight Championship from Barry Windham at Chi-Town Rumble, Lex Luger continued his feud with Windham. On March 18 edition of World Championship Wrestling, Luger and Michael Hayes competed against Barry and Kendall Windham in a tag team match, during which Hayes turned on Luger and helped the Windhams in winning the match. As a result, Hayes joined Hiro Matsuda's group Yamazaki Corporation and began a rivalry with Luger. At WrestleWar, Hayes defeated Luger, with the help of Terry Gordy to win the United States Championship.

The Road Warriors (Hawk and Animal) continued their rivalry with The Varsity Club after retaining the NWA World Tag Team Championship against Club members Kevin Sullivan and Steve Williams at Chi-Town Rumble. On April 2 Clash of the Champions VI, Road Warriors lost the belts to Club members Mike Rotunda and Steve Williams. At WrestleWar, Rotunda and Williams defended the titles against Road Warriors. Club members Kevin Sullivan and Dan Spivey attacked the special guest referee Nikita Koloff, resulting in a disqualification loss for Rotunda and Williams. This misconduct between Club members caused the titles to get vacated.

Sting would capture his first NWA title, the NWA World TV title, beating Mike Rotunda on March 30, 1989 in the last TV taping of World Championship Wrestling held in the TBS studios (tapings moved to the Center Stage auditorium on April 15), ending 17 years of tapings at TBS. Paul E. Dangerously would begin his own segment, "The Danger Zone", on WCW TV as well as managing the newly arrived Samoan Swat Team.

== Results ==
No.	Results	Stipulations	Times
1	Michael Hayes defeated Russian Assassin I (with Paul Jones)	Singles match	15:48
2	Sting defeated Butch Reed (with Hiro Matsuda)	Singles match	20:07
3	The Midnight Express (Bobby Eaton and Stan Lane) and Jim Cornette defeated The Original Midnight Express (Jack Victory and Randy Rose) and Paul E. Dangerously	Six-Man Tag Team Loser of the fall Leaves NWA match Because Randy Rose was pinned, he was forced to leave the NWA.	15:51
4	Mike Rotunda defeated Rick Steiner (c) (with Scott Steiner)	Singles match for the NWA World Television Championship	16:21
5	Lex Luger defeated Barry Windham (c) (with Hiro Matsuda)	Singles match for the NWA United States Heavyweight Championship	10:43
6	The Road Warriors (Animal and Hawk) (c) (with Paul Ellering) defeated The Varsity Club (Kevin Sullivan and Steve Williams)	Tag team match for the NWA World Tag Team Championship	8:27
7	Ricky Steamboat defeated Ric Flair (c) (with Hiro Matsuda)	Singles match for the NWA World Heavyweight Championship	23:18
(c) / – the champion(s) heading into the match
