= The Black Scorpion (professional wrestling) =

Professional wrestling gimmick

The Black Scorpion is a retired professional wrestling gimmick in World Championship Wrestling in 1990 that was played by Ric Flair and variety of other wrestlers. The character had a feud with Sting which lasted from fall to winter that year.

== History ==
On August 12, 1990, on WCW Main Event, Missy Hyatt conducted an interview with NWA World Heavyweight Champion Sting, where it was announced that he would be facing a mysterious opponent called The Black Scorpion on the upcoming Clash of Champions. Nothing was known of the opponent, and on the August 24th episode of The Power Hour former NWA champion and Sting nemesis Ric Flair declared that The Four Horsemen had nothing to do with the mystery man. A day later on World Championship Wrestling, the first vignette for the Scorpion aired, showing him as a hooded figure in a darkly lit room. He declared that he was a man from Sting's past, specifically referencing "California in 1986" and stating that he had a different face from the man that Sting once knew. On NWA Worldwide on September 1, The Black Scorpion stated that he would unmask if Sting could defeat him at the Clash. WCW booker and former wrestler Ole Anderson provided the voice for the character, with his voice distorted enough to keep the fans pondering his identity. Meanwhile, the announcers and parties involved attempted to imply that The Scorpion was a former friend of Sting, with the main suspects being former tag partner Jim Hellwig (a.k.a. Ultimate Warrior, who was the WWF Champion at the time), or former training and Powerteam USA partner Dave Sheldon aka The Angel of Death.

On September 5, 1990, at Clash of the Champions XII "Fall Brawl: Mountain Madness", the main event was indeed Sting versus The Black Scorpion. Clad in a mask and a black body suit (and portrayed by the recently arrived Al Perez), the Black Scorpion was defeated by the NWA World Champion. However, as Sting was about to unmask him when another much larger, masked figure emerge onto the rampway, wearing a cloak and standing imposingly. . The announcers immediately declared that this was the true Black Scorpion, but before matters could be resolved Sting was confronted by Four Horsemen member Sid Vicious. The show and its mysterious opponent angle drew a 5.8 rating, which was the highest Clash rating for World Championship Wrestling that year.

In vignettes after the Clash ended, the Scorpion stated that he intended to destroy Sting's confidence between that point and the NWA World Champion's upcoming match with Sid at Halloween Havoc 1990. On the WCW house show circuit, Sting faced off for the first time on September 16, 1990, in Houston, TX. The Scorpion here was portrayed by Bill Irwin and Sting was victorious. On September 23 in Atlanta, GA at the Omni a rematch took place, with Sting defeating Randy Culley under the Scorpion mask. This would be the first of many house show matches where Sting faced the Scorpion who was portrayed by a variety of performers - Al Perez (September 30), Culley, Jeff Ellis or The Angel of Death. Ric Flair has long claimed that Al Perez was originally supposed to be the one who would ultimately be revealed to be the Black Scorpion. However, Perez has disputed Flair's claim, claiming that he was only officially booked to wear the Black Scorpion mask one time, and that he was not asked to be tied to the character over the long term. Jim Ross, who at the time was WCW's prominent play-by-play announcer, stated on the February 21, 2022 episode of his podcast Grilling with JR that WCW "did not have the tables set" for Sting's title run at the time of the Black Scorpion angle, with the character being created to give Sting a high-profile title defense with a clean win. According to Ross, WCW was in fact looking through a "huge cast" of contenders as challengers to Sting at the time of angle due to the lack of momentum for the company's mid-level heel wrestlers.

Meanwhile, on the September 29th episode of World Championship Wrestling the Scorpion confronted Sting while he was being interviewed, only to be driven back by Brian Pillman. On the October 6th episode, a blindfolded Gordon Solie was brought to the Scorpion's lair to interview him. The Scorpion told Solie to ask Sting about "Tulsa". A week later on World Championship Wrestling he stated in another vignette that he would disappear for a time to allow Sting to focus on Sid Vicious, but that he would reappear at Halloween Havoc. However house show matches between the two would continue, and as October progressed Sting would unmask his opponent at the end of each encounter and reveal the faces of Bill Irwin and Moondog Rex. On October 14 in Atlanta at the Omni the Scorpion character would wrestle someone besides the NWA World Champion for the first time, defeating Brian Pillman.

On October 27, 1990, at Halloween Havoc 90 the Black Scorpion made his promised return during an interview with Sting. After interrupting the world champion he abducted a female fan and teleported to the opposite side of the PPV stage. On the November 10th episode of World Championship Wrestling and the November 17th episode of WCW Worldwide he commandeered the arena PA system, taunting Sting while he was in the ring. On the November 17th edition of World Championship Wrestling the Scorpion had a referee attack Sting. On the November 20th Clash of the Champions XIII the character abducted a fan from the crowd and ultimately transforming him into a tiger as a bewildered Sting looked on. According to one wrestling website, magician Franz Harary performed the illusions.

Eventually, a rematch was signed between Sting and the Black Scorpion for Starrcade. It was to be a cage match with professional wrestling legend Dick the Bruiser as the special guest referee. During the entrance, various individuals came out dressed as The Black Scorpion, among them were Colonel DeKlerk, Moondog Rex, Angel Of Death and Bill Irwin. The rule was if the Black Scorpion did not win the title, he would be forced to reveal his identity. Sting defeated the Black Scorpion with a flying shoulder tackle off the top rope. However, after The Scorpion lost, the other "Scorpions" entered the ring, and Sting and Dick the Bruiser started to fight and unmask them one by one. It wasn't until both were outnumbered by Barry Windham and Arn Anderson and getting locked inside the cage that more babyface wrestlers came out to break in the cage, that the Scorpion who wrestled Sting was unmasked to reveal Ric Flair. According to Flair, it would have been either himself or Barry Windham. Flair volunteered thinking the gimmick wouldn't hurt him, whereas it could Windham, who recently portrayed an imposter Sting at Halloween Havoc on October 27. The Black Scorpion angle ended with Flair's unmasking.

=== Aftermath ===
In his first interview after Starrcade, Ric Flair jokingly adopted the "Black Scorpion" voice before challenging him to a rematch. That match would take place on January 11, 1991, at the Meadowlands, where Flair would regain the world championship. Meanwhile, the Black Scorpion character would live on, despite his official unmasking as "The Nature Boy". The character made a one off return on May 12, 1991, at a house show in Dayton, OH when "The Black Scorpion" faced and was defeated by Brad Armstrong.

Outside of World Championship Wrestling the masked character would go on to make subsequent appearances. The gimmick would return in International World Class Championship Wrestling on February 22, 1991, when Tony Atlas appeared as The Black Scorpion to face IWCCW Champion Vic Steamboat at a television taping, losing via disqualification. On October 30, 1991, the character appeared at the inaugural TV taping for Smoky Mountain Wrestling. Portrayed by Doug Stahl, he was defeated by Paul Miller. Stahl would periodically reprise the gimmick during the 1990s, next appearing as The Black Scorpion for the Pro Wrestling Federation and losing to the Italian Stallion on April 2, 1993. He would feud with the Stallion throughout the remainder of 1993 and into 1994, and his last appearance as the Scorpion came on January 7, 1995, when he lost to Johnny Dollar at an event in Inman, South Carolina. Three other wrestlers - Ray Hudson, Terry Austin, and Randy Sledge who were also competing in the PWF adopted the gimmick and would occasionally appear as the Black Scorpion during the same time period. Terry Austin would reprise the character a final time in Unified Championship Wrestling at an event in Bayou La Batre, Alabama when he faced Chris Adidas.

== See also ==
- The Four Horsemen
