= Rip Morgan =

New Zealand professional wrestler (born 1957)

Personal information
- Born: Michael Morgan; August 20, 1957 (age 68) Wellington, New Zealand

Professional wrestling career
- Ring name(s): The Crusher; Mike Morgan; The Thing; The Real Thing; Rip Morgan; Ripper Morgan; Bigfoot
- Billed height: 6 ft 3 in (191 cm)
- Billed weight: 275 lb (125 kg)
- Billed from: Wellington, New Zealand
- Debut: 1983
- Retired: 2002

Michael Morgan (born August 20, 1957) is a former professional wrestler from New Zealand who competed in the National Wrestling Alliance, World Championship Wrestling and World Class Championship Wrestling as Rip Morgan. He is perhaps best known as one half of The New Zealand Militia in WCW with Jack Victory. Morgan also wrestled in WCW/NAWA/SAPW with Victory as "The Royal Family". He was the last flag bearer for the original New Zealand Sheepherders. He was formerly the CEO of the now defunct Wellington-based professional wrestling promotion Kiwi Pro Wrestling.

== Professional wrestling career ==
=== Early career (1983–1985) ===
Mike Morgan made his professional wrestling debut in 1983 under the Ring name Rip Morgan, working in his native New Zealand. On 8 September 1983 he won the NWA New Zealand Heavyweight Championship, but records are not clear on who he defeated to win the championship, nor who he later on lost the championship to. In 1984, he travelled to the United States of America where he was paired up with The Sheepherders (Luke Williams and Butch Miller), working as their "Flag Bearer", someone who would wave the New Zealand flag during their introductions and help them cheat during their matches. Morgan worked with the two to continue his wrestling training as Williams and Miller taught him aspects of professional wrestling outside of the actual wrestling moves. In 1985, Morgan wrestled as Bigfoot for the WWF appearing on TV.

=== Kiwi Sheepherders (1985–1986) ===
After his brief WWF run Morgan teamed up with Jonathan Boyd to form a new version of the Sheepherders, using the name the "Kiwi Sheepherders". Boyd and Morgan quickly made their name known in the Continental Wrestling Association, based out of Memphis, Tennessee by defeating CWA's most popular team The Fabulous Ones (Steve Keirn and Stan Lane) for AWA Southern Tag Team Championship on 17 June 1985. The team was soon stripped of the titles due to excessive cheating but had the titles returned to them when Boyd and Morgan threatened to sue CWA management. Instead of taking the titles from the Sheepherders by stripping them the Fabulous Ones took the Southern tag team titles from them the old fashioned way – 4 times in a row between 5 September and 12 October. After the series of violent matches with the Fabulous Ones came to an end the Sheepherders came face to face with another team that would turn out to be a constant thorn in their side The Fantastics (Bobby Fulton and Tommy Rogers). Jonathan Boyd reunited with the Sheepherders in the World Wrestling Council in Puerto Rico. In the winter of 1985 the Kiwi Sheepherders and the Fantastics traded wins back and forth with no side gaining a clear advantage in their feud. In January 1986 the Kiwi Sheepherders defeated the teams of Koko Ware and Rick Casey and also the team of Tojo Yamamoto and Dirty Rhodes to reach the finals of a tournament to crown new Southern Tag Team Champions, but in the finals they fell to the Fantastics. The loss to the Fantastics only intensified the Sheepherders' anger bringing the feud to its high point as the two teams clashed in a "No DQ Loser Leaves Town" match on 20 January 1986. The Kiwi Sheepherders lost and left Memphis while the Fantastics rode a wave of popularity thanks to the feud.

=== The Thing, Rip Morgan (1987–1988) ===
Following the dissolution of the Sheepherders Morgan ended up worked for Fritz Von Erich's World Class Championship Wrestling in Texas under the ring name "The Thing" and later on "The Real Thing". In Texas he lost to Kerry Von Erich on WCCW's "Thanksgiving Star Wars" show in 1987. Later on Morgan joined Jim Crockett Promotions, later known as World Championship Wrestling (WCW). He worked the 1988 Great American Bash tour facing Bugsy McGraw on several stops of the tour. Later on Morgan and Jonathan Holliday teamed up to challenge for the NWA United States Tag Team Championship but lost to The Fantastics (Bobby Fulton and Tommy Rogers. At Clash of the Champions V special event Rip Morgan lost to Rick Steiner. Two months later he challenged Sting for the NWA World Television Championship at Clash of the Champions VII but again was unsuccessful in his efforts.

=== Teaming with Jack Victory (1989–1993) ===
In 1989 the bookers of World Championship Wrestling decided to put Rip Morgan together with another former flagbearer of the Sheepherders, Jack Victory, creating a tag team known as the "New Zealand Militia", billing Victory as a native of New Zealand despite him being born in the United States. The two made their in-ring debut on 14 June 1989 where they took part in a tournament for the vacant NWA World Tag Team Championship. The team faced and lost to The Dynamic Dudes (Shane Douglas and Johnny Ace, also a former flag bearer for the Sheepherders). Following the tournament loss the Militia found themselves frequently facing off against the Dynamic Dudes over the summer and fall of 1989. In 1990 WCW gave Morgan and Victory a new image, re-introducing them as "The Royal Family", naming them Ripper Morgan and Jack O'Victory and adding the manager Lord Littlebrook to the group. The Royal Family were billed as descendants of British Royalty. The Royal Family family was one of eight teams entered in a tournament for the vacant WCW United States Tag Team Championship. The group lost in the first round to eventual tournament winners Flyin' Brian and "Z-Man" Tom Zenk. WCW held the "Pat O'Connor International Tag Team Tournament" as part of the 1990 Starrcade with eight teams representing various countries. The storyline was that the Royal Family had won a tournament in Australia to earn the rights to represent Australia and New Zealand; in reality none of the teams had won qualifying tournaments. Victory and Morgan lost to "Team Japan" (Masa Saito and The Great Muta) in the first round of the tournament. The Royal Family's last significant appearance with WCW was on April 28, 1991, where they teamed up with Black Bart as they unsuccessfully challenged the team of the Junkyard Dog, Ricky Morton and Tommy Rich for the WCW World Six-Man Tag Team Championship. In 1991 Victory and Morgan made their way to the Global Wrestling Federation in Dallas, this time as "The Maulers." The duo competed in the tournament for the first ever GWF Tag Team Championship. In the first round they defeated "Wet'n'Wild" (Steve Ray and Sunny Beach), followed by a victory over Chaz and Terry Garvin. In the third round—the semi-finals of the tournament—the Maulers lost to eventual tournament winners Chris Walker and Steve Simpson. Wrestling as the Maulers, Victory and Morgan also wrestled a dark match at a WWF Superstars taping in Mobile, Alabama on March 9, 1992, defeating Jim Cooper and John Allen. The Maulers did not stay in the GWF after the tournament, instead moving on to Smoky Mountain Wrestling (SMW) in Tennessee. They competed in a tournament to determine the first ever SMW Tag Team Champions. In the first round the Maulers defeated the Rich Brothers (Davey Rich and Johnny Rich), but lost to The Fantastics (Bobby Fulton and Jackie Fulton) in the second round to be eliminated from the tournament. Their short lived run in SMW was the last time Morgan and Victory teamed together on a regular basis.

=== Late career (1993–present) ===
In 1993, Morgan wrestled in Germany, and was known for performing a Maori Haka before each match. Morgan retired from full-time wrestling in 2002 and returned to his native New Zealand, where he began promoting wrestling. He later became the CEO of the Wellington-based professional wrestling promotion Kiwi Pro Wrestling. The promotion is now defunct.

== Championships and accomplishments ==
- Continental Wrestling Association
  - AWA Southern Tag Team Championship (5 times) – with Jonathan Boyd
- NWA New Zealand
  - NWA New Zealand Heavyweight Championship (1 time)
- Pro Wrestling Illustrated
  - PWI ranked him #229 of the top 500 singles wrestlers in the PWI 500 in 1992
- Western Ohio Wrestling
  - WOW Tag Team Championship (1 time) – with Jack Victory
