= Al Perez =

American professional wrestler

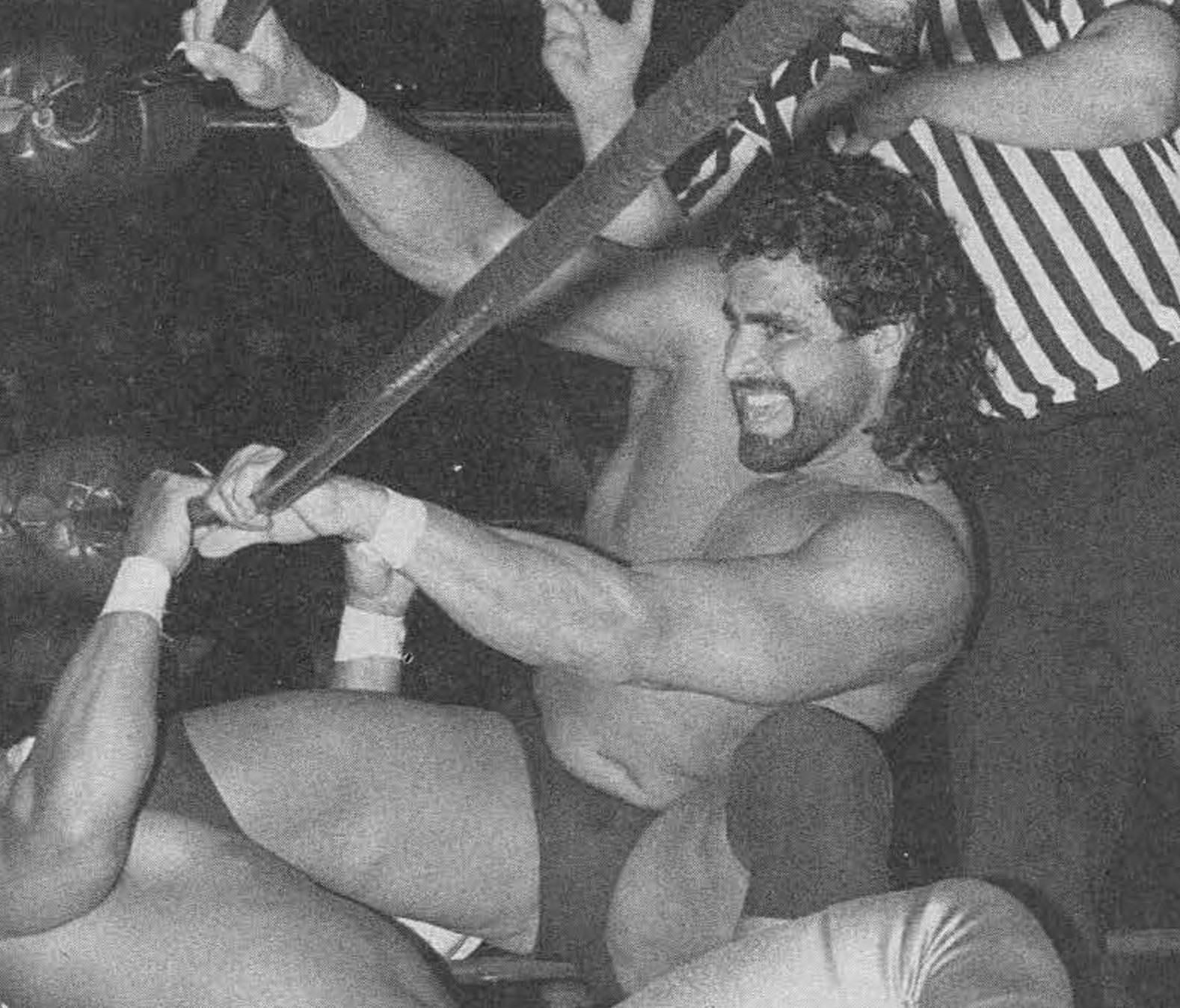
- Perez, c. 1988

Personal information
- Born: July 23, 1957 (age 69) Tampa, Florida, U.S.

Professional wrestling career
- Ring name(s): Al Perez; Alex Perez; The Black Scorpion
- Billed height: 6 ft 1 in (185 cm)
- Billed weight: 245 lb (111 kg)
- Trained by: Boris Malenko; Steve Keirn
- Debut: 1982
- Retired: 2002

Al Perez (born July 23, 1957) is an American retired professional wrestler. He held 16 titles during a 20-year career, including the WCWA World Heavyweight Championship.

== Professional wrestling career ==
=== Early career (1982–1985) ===
Perez began wrestling as an amateur in high school and was one of the top athletes in his home state of Florida. He started professional wrestling in 1982. He wrestled in Southwest Championship Wrestling in Texas and formed a team in ICW with Joe Savoldi known as the "New York Rockers". He then worked for the World Wrestling Council in Puerto Rico where he teamed a lot with Joe Savoldi and later feuded with Invader l.

=== Mid-South Wrestling (1985–1986) ===
On August 31, 1985, while wrestling for Bill Watts's Mid-South Wrestling, Perez teamed with "Wildcat" Wendell Cooley, and defeated the team of "Dr. Death" Steve Williams and "Bruiser" Bob Sweetan for the Mid-South Tag Team Championship. Sweetan was substituting for Ted DiBiase while DiBiase was touring Asia.

=== World Class Championship Wrestling (1987–1988) ===
Perez went on to make a name for himself as "The Latin Heartthrob" in World Class Championship Wrestling in 1987, where he was the top heel for several months. He was managed by Gary Hart and feuded with Kevin Von Erich, Kerry Von Erich and Dingo Warrior.

Perez won the World Class Texas Championship after supposedly defeating previous champion Warrior in a phantom match in Puerto Rico on 21 June 1987. He later defeated Kevin Von Erich for the WCWA World Heavyweight Championship by forfeit. On 25 December 1987 he successfully defended the title in a steel cage match against Kerry Von Erich, recently returned from a 1986 motorcycle accident. Hart and Von Erich's father Fritz were supposed to be handcuffed together but after Fritz was attacked by several heels and afterwards (kayfabe) collapsed with a suspected heart attack, Hart alone was handdcuffed to the ropes. A distraught (kayfabe) Von Erich nonetheless went ahead with the title challenge. Perez managed to smash Von Erich's head into the handcuffs to score the pinfall win.

Von Erich later defeated Perez for the title. Perez and Hart left for Jim Crockett Promotions.

=== Jim Crockett Promotions (1988–1989) ===
In 1988, Perez moved to the National Wrestling Alliance's Jim Crockett Promotions with Hart and teamed with Larry Zbyszko feuding with Nikita Koloff and Dusty Rhodes.

=== Professional Wrestling Federation (1989) ===
In 1989, Perez wrestled for Dusty Rhodes' Professional Wrestling Federation based in Florida. He won the PWF Florida Heavyweight Title, defeating Mike Graham for the title. He later lost the title to Dustin Rhodes.

=== World Wrestling Federation (1989–1990) ===
Al Perez signed with the World Wrestling Federation and made his debut on October 2, 1989, with a win over George South in a dark match at a WWF Superstars of Wrestling taping in Wheeling, West Virginia. Perez was undefeated the first month, wrestling primarily on C shows against Barry Horowitz and The Brooklyn Brawler. His first loss would come against Boris Zukhov on November 17, 1989, in Hershey, Pennsylvania. Perez would then continue to wrestle primarily on the undercard, although in one WWF Prime Time Wrestling show host Gorilla Monsoon made mention of a possible tag-team pairing of Perez and Santana. Perez was primarily seen on house shows and Prime Time Wrestling. Despite sustaining losses to the likes of Hercules and Tito Santana, Perez had many wins over wrestlers such as Paul Roma, Jim Powers, Red Rooster, Koko B. Ware, "Bullet" Bob Bradley, Paul Diamond/Kato, Jim Brunzell, and others. His last WWF match was a win over Jim Powers on July 23, 1990, in West Palm Beach, Florida.

=== World Championship Wrestling (1990) ===
On September 5, 1990, Perez competed as The Black Scorpion, wrestling Sting in a losing effort at Clash of the Champions XII. According to Ric Flair, Perez was always meant to be The Black Scorpion, but quit after finding out he was going to lose. Perez disputes this claiming he was booked to be the Black Scorpion only one time. Perez notes he lost to Sting in the match and stated he was not asked to continue long term as the character. Perez would wrestle one more match as The Scorpion at a house show in Chicago, Illinois on September 30.

=== Global Wrestling Federation (1991) ===
Perez reached the finals of a tournament to crown the first GWF North American Heavyweight Champion before losing to The Patriot at the promotion's debut show on 10 August 1991 in Dallas, Texas. However, because Perez's feet were under the ropes when he was pinned, the Patriot, as a matter of conscience (kayfabe) refused the victory and vacated the title, defeating Perez cleanly in a rematch on 23 August 1991. Perez was (kayfabe) so impressed with his opponent's integrity and sportsmanship that he changed his ways and became a babyface once again.

=== All Japan Wrestling (1991, 1993, 1994) ===
Perez traveled to All Japan Wrestling and teamed with Dory Funk Jr. against Dan Kroffat and Doug Furnas on December 6, 1991. He would wrestle in tag-team matches for All Japan again in 1993 and 1994.

=== Late career (1991–2002) ===
During the 1990s, Perez competed in several independent promotions around the United States, including a return to Liberty All-Star Wrestling (LAW) in 2001, where he beat Jimmy Jannetty for the LAW Heavyweight title before retiring from the business in 2002.

== Championships and accomplishments ==
- Championship Wrestling from Florida
  - FCW Heavyweight Championship (1 time)
  - PWF Florida Heavyweight Championship (1 time)
- Liberty All-Star Wrestling
  - LAW Heavyweight Championship (1 time)
- Mid-South Wrestling
  - Mid-South Tag Team Championship (1 time) - with Wendell Cooley
- NWA New Zealand
  - NWA Australasian Tag Team Championship (1 time) - with Mark Lewin
  - NWA New Zealand British Commonwealth Championship (2 times)
- Pro Wrestling Illustrated
  - PWI ranked him # 272 of the 500 best singles wrestlers during the "PWI Years" in 2003.
- Southwest Championship Wrestling
  - SCW Southwest Tag Team Championship (1 time) - with Manny Fernandez
- Supreme Wrestling Federation
  - SWF Tag Team championship (1 time) - with Paul Orndorff
- Texas Wrestling Federation
  - TWF Heavyweight Championship (2 times)
- Western States Sports
  - NWA Western States Tag Team Championship (1 time) - with Dennis Stamp
- World Class Wrestling Association
  - NWA Texas Heavyweight Championship (1 time)
  - WCWA World Heavyweight Championship (1 time)
- World Wrestling Council
  - WWC North American Heavyweight Championship (1 time)
  - WWC Puerto Rico Heavyweight Championship (1 time)
  - WWC World Tag Team Championship (1 time) - with Joe Savoldi
