= Randy Rose =

American professional wrestler (born 1956)

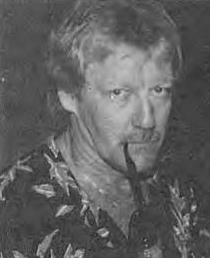
- Rose in 1987

Personal information
- Born: Randall Alls; July 19, 1956 (age 70) Nashville, Tennessee, U.S.

Professional wrestling career
- Ring name(s): Randy Alls; Randy Rose; Super Pro
- Billed height: 6 ft 2 in (188 cm)
- Billed weight: 240 lb (109 kg)
- Debut: 1974
- Retired: 2015

Randall Alls (born July 19, 1956) is an American retired professional wrestler, better known by his ring name, Randy Rose.

== Professional wrestling career ==
=== Early career (1974–1987) ===
Randy Rose began his career in 1974 in Tennessee.

In 1980, Rose formed a tag team with Dennis Condrey in the Alabama-based promotion Southeast Championship Wrestling. The duo initially feuded with Norvell Austin before joining forces with Austin to form a stable, The Midnight Express. The trio dominated the tag team scene there until 1983, when Condrey left SCW for Mid-South Wrestling, where he reformed The Midnight Express with Bobby Eaton.

=== American Wrestling Association (1987) ===
Rose reunited with Condrey in the American Wrestling Association in 1987. Now known as "Ravishing" Randy Rose, he and Condrey called themselves "The Midnight Express", and claimed the right to the name, which had since been used by Condrey and Eaton and later by Eaton and Stan Lane. The duo were managed by Paul E. Dangerously. Condrey and Rose defeated Jerry Lawler and Bill Dundee for the AWA World Tag Team Championship on October 30, 1987, in Whitewater, Wisconsin. They would have a two-month title reign, losing the titles to the returning Midnight Rockers (Shawn Michaels and Marty Jannetty) on December 27, 1987 in Las Vegas, Nevada.

=== World Championship Wrestling (1988–1989) ===
Condrey and Rose resurfaced in NWA flagship promotion World Championship Wrestling (with Dangerously) in November 1988, now known as "The Original Midnight Express". During the November 5 episode of World Championship Wrestling, Jim Cornette kayfabe received an anonymous phone call. The caller ridiculed Cornette over Eaton and Lane's loss of the NWA World Tag Team Championship to The Road Warriors on October 29. Cornette recognized the caller and basically asked him to come say it to his face. At that point, Dangerously and the Original Midnight Express hit the ring and proceeded to pummel Cornette and Stan Lane, who was wrestling in a singles match. By the time Bobby Eaton showed up, it was three on one. Cornette showed up the next week on TBS carrying his blood stained suit jacket and the feud was on. The teams wrestled at Starrcade '88: True Gritt, but nothing was solved.

The Midnights vs. Midnights would be the hottest feud in WCW for months, building up to a six-man tag match involving the managers at the Chi-Town Rumble pay-per-view in February 1989. The one who got pinned would have to leave the promotion. However, WCW (the former Jim Crockett Promotions) was under new ownership and in transition at the time and many wrestlers were coming and going. At the last minute, Condrey decided to leave WCW. Jack Victory was brought in as his replacement and the match went forward, but at this point no one really cared. Rose would leave WCW for a time and Dangerously would go on to bring in the Samoan Swat Team as his new team.

Rose would return to WCW for a brief time in mid 1989.

=== Late career (1989–2015) ===
In 1990 and 1991, Rose wrestled for Georgia All-Star Wrestling and the Global Wrestling Federation (GWF). He retired from active competition in 1992 after 18 years.

He returned to wrestling in 2004 working in independent shows in Alabama. On May 5, 2006, Rose reunited with Dennis Condrey losing to the Steiner Brothers in a Steel Cage match for TNT Wrestling in Lawrenceville, Georgia. Four months later they lost to Brad and Bob Armstrong. Afterwards, Rose retired from wrestling again.

On January 10, 2015 he teamed with Tom Prichard as they lost to the Rock 'n' Roll Express for Big Time Wrestling in Spartanburg, South Carolina.

Rose was also very involved with charity work during his wrestling career and tried to use his status as a pro wrestler to raise money.

== Championships and accomplishments ==
- All Star Wrestling Alliance
  - ASWA Georgia Tag Team Championship (2 times) - with Ron Starr (1 time) and Doug Somers (1 time)
- American Wrestling Association
  - AWA World Tag Team Championship (1 time) - with Dennis Condrey
- Continental Wrestling Association
  - AWA Southern Tag Team Championship (4 times) - with Dennis Condrey and Norvell Austin^{A}
- Central States Wrestling
  - NWA Central States Heavyweight Championship (1 time)
  - NWA Central States Tag Team Championship (1 time) - with Bryan St. John
- Deep South Wrestling
  - Deep South Heavyweight Championship (1 time)
- Professional Wrestling Hall of Fame
  - Class of 2019 - Inducted as part of The Midnight Express with "Loverboy" Dennis Condrey and "Beautiful" Bobby Eaton
- Southeastern Championship Wrestling
  - NWA Southeastern Tag Team Championship (13 times) - with Ron Bass (1 time), Dennis Condrey (4 times), Pat Rose (1 time), Jimmy Golden (1 time), and Dennis Condrey and Norvell Austin (6 times)^{A}
- Windy City Pro Wrestling
  - WCPW Tag Team Championship (1 time) - with Dennis Condrey

^{A}Rose, Austin and Condrey held the championship collectively via the "Freebird Rule"

== See also ==
- The Dangerous Alliance
- The Midnight Express
