= Ivan Koloff =

Canadian professional wrestler (1942–2017)

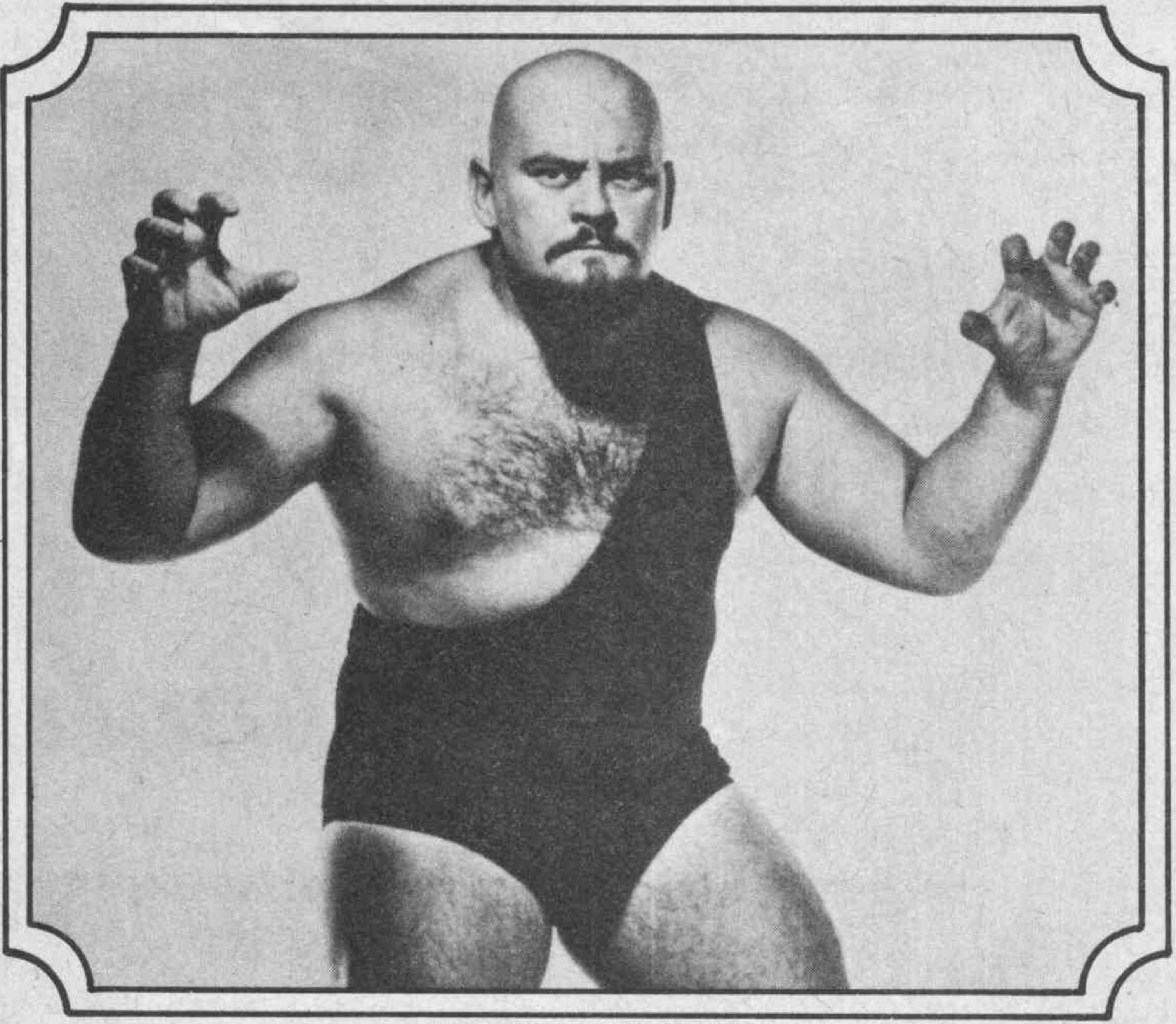
- Koloff, c. 1973

Personal information
- Born: Oreal Donald Perras; August 25, 1942 Montreal, Canada
- Died: February 18, 2017 (aged 74) Winterville, North Carolina, U.S.
- Cause of death: Liver cancer

Professional wrestling career
- Ring name(s): Ivan Koloff; Jim Parris; Orwell Paris; Red McNulty
- Billed height: 6 ft 1 in (185 cm)
- Billed weight: 298 lb (135 kg)
- Billed from: Moscow, Russia; Ukraine; Ireland (Red McNulty)
- Trained by: Jack Wentworth; Dan Koloff
- Debut: February 15, 1963
- Retired: November 16, 2013

Oreal Donald Perras (August 25, 1942 – February 18, 2017) was a Canadian professional wrestler, better known by the ring name "The Russian Bear" Ivan Koloff, under which name he was billed as being from Russia and, following the dissolution of the Soviet Union, Ukraine. He was the third wrestler to hold the WWWF Championship. In April 2025, Koloff was inducted into the WWE Hall of Fame.

== Early life ==
Perras was born in Montreal, Canada and raised on a dairy farm in rural Ontario along with his six brothers and three sisters.

Since first watching professional wrestling on TV at the age of eight, he wanted to become a wrestler, and would often wrestle with his brothers growing up. At age 18, he left high school and joined Jack Wentworth's wrestling school in Hamilton, Ontario, where he would lift weights and learn wrestling holds.

== Professional wrestling career ==
=== Early career (1963–1967) ===
Perras debuted as an Irish rogue villain character named Red McNulty, billed from Dublin, Ireland, and wrestling with an eyepatch. For the next three years, he wrestled around the Toronto area, eventually quitting his regular job to wrestle in the north-western area of Canada. There, Perras acquired much wrestling experience, and from there he made his first trip to Japan.

=== The Russian Bear (1967–1994) ===
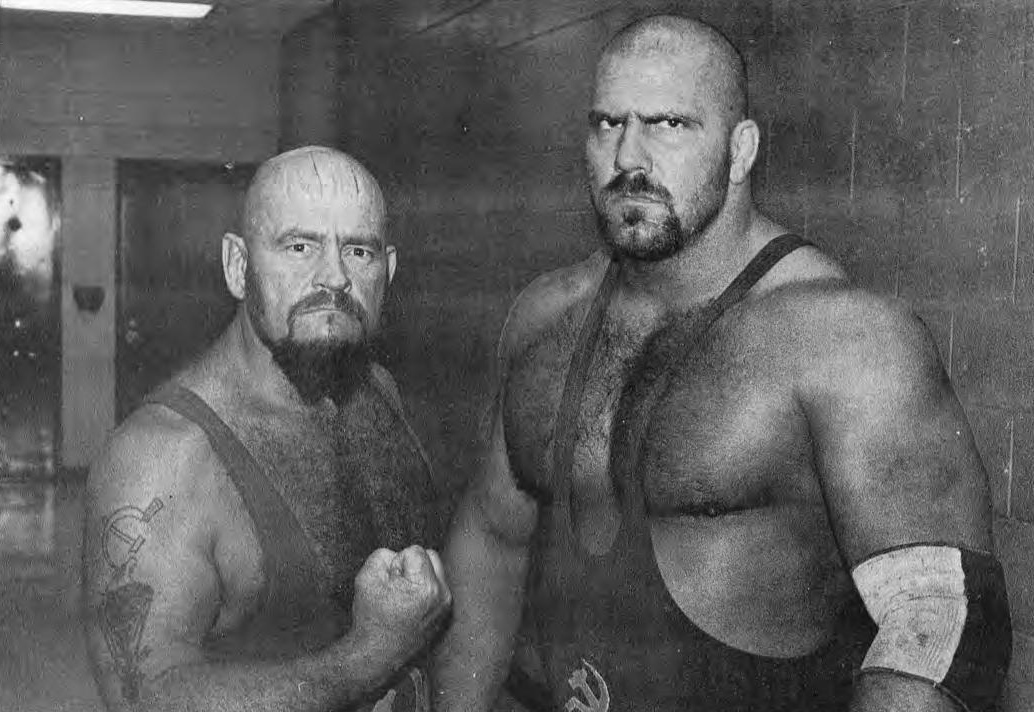
Ivan and Nikita Koloff in 1986

In 1967, Perras became "The Russian Bear" Ivan Koloff, a bearded villainous character billed from Ukraine (the name was taken from Dan Kolov, an actual Bulgarian wrestler who had competed in Canada in the 1930s), and debuted with the International Wrestling Association in Montreal. He defeated Johnny Rougeau for the IWA International Heavyweight Championship the following year. Koloff debuted in the World Wide Wrestling Federation in late 1969, managed by "Captain" Lou Albano. He soon started a rivalry with then-WWWF World Heavyweight Champion Bruno Sammartino. On January 18, 1971, Koloff defeated Sammartino in Madison Square Garden for the WWWF World Heavyweight Championship by pinfall after a knee drop from the top rope, ending Sammartino's seven and two-thirds years reign. Koloff lost the championship 21 days later to Pedro Morales, essentially being used as a "transitional champion" to move the title from Sammartino to Morales without the two fan favorites working against each other, much like Stan Stasiak and The Iron Sheik would be in later years. After the loss, Koloff remained a contender for the title but never reclaimed it, leaving the WWWF in 1971. During his time in the WWWF, Koloff weighing in at 310 pounds (140 kg) wrestled WWWF World Heavyweight Championship title matches against Sammartino, Morales, Superstar Billy Graham and Bob Backlund, holding the distinction, with fellow villain Stan Stasiak, as one of only two men to challenge all four of these champions. Koloff would also challenge Sammartino for the WWWF World Heavyweight Championship in the first ever steel cage match at Madison Square Garden in a rematch loss on December 15, 1975. He fought in the WWWF from 1975 to 1976, 1978–1979 and 1983.

During the 1970s and 1980s, Koloff found success in the National Wrestling Alliance, winning many regional tag team and singles titles in the Georgia, Florida, and Mid-Atlantic territories. In February 1981, he teamed with Ray Stevens to defeat Paul Jones and Masked Superstar to capture the NWA World Tag Team Championship. This would be the first of his four reigns as NWA World Tag Team Champion, later winning the belts with Don Kernodle and twice with Russian sympathizer, Krusher Kruschev, and his "nephew" (kayfabe), Nikita Koloff as The Russian Team using the "Freebird Rule".

In April and May 1973, Koloff wrestled in Japan for the International Wrestling Enterprise promotion as part of its Dynamite Series. In his debut match, he teamed with Mad Dog Vachon to defeat Great Kusatsu and Strong Kobayashi for the IWA World Tag Team Championship in a two-out-of-three falls match. They lost the titles to Great Kusatsu and Rusher Kimura several weeks later.

The Russians (which also included Krusher Kruschev) were a top villainous group from 1984 to 1986, and Nikita, under Perras' training and mentoring, and by association, became a hated villain in his own right, and would go on to have a successful singles career of his own. After Nikita turned on Ivan to join their enemy Dusty Rhodes in 1986, the latter teamed with Vladimir Petrov and Dick Murdoch to get revenge. Koloff's biggest NWA feuds were against Rhodes, The Road Warriors, The Rock 'n' Roll Express (Ricky Morton and Robert Gibson) and Magnum T. A. In 1988, Koloff spent time in Paul Jones' faction, The Paul Jones Army, where he was a "coach" of sorts for The Powers of Pain, The Barbarian and The Warlord. He later split with Jones, reunited with Nikita, and feuded with Jones' team, The Russian Assassins, before leaving Jim Crockett Promotions in January 1989. In 1992, Koloff also wrestled in the first television main event of Jim Cornette's Smoky Mountain Wrestling, beating Bobby Fulton. He lost to Ron Garvin at Tim Horner's National Championship Wrestling on July 22, 1994. He retired afterwards.

=== Eastern Championship Wrestling (1992–1993) ===
He also spent time in Eastern Championship Wrestling, appearing on the very first ECW card in 1992. In 1993 he began teaming with his storyline nephew Vladimir Koloff. The team won their debut match on the June 29 edition of ECW Hardcore TV. Koloff defeated The Sandman on the July 6, 1993, episode of ECW Hardcore TV in a number one contenders match for the ECW Heavyweight Championship.

=== Return to wrestling (2004–2013) ===
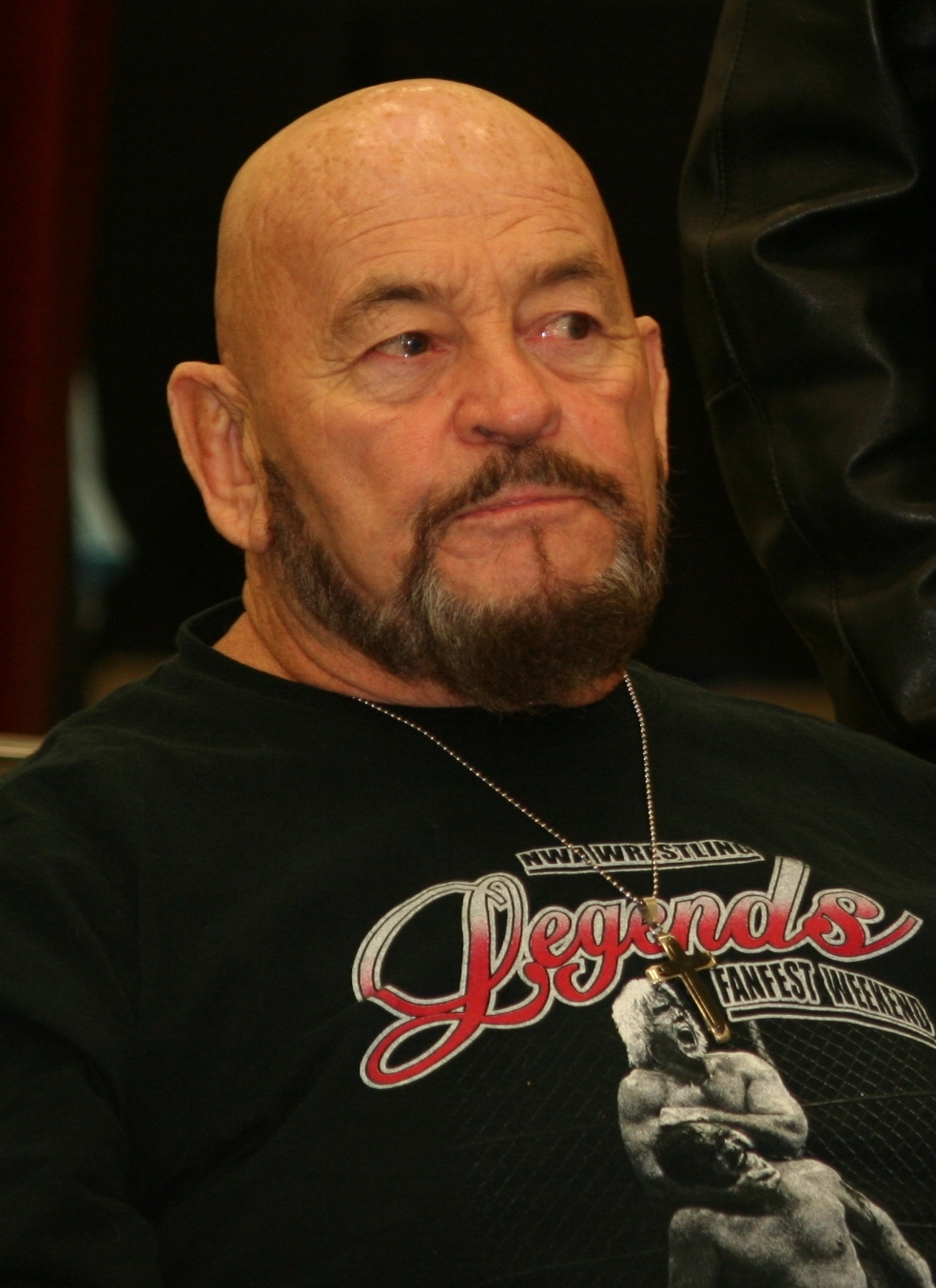
Koloff in 2012

In 2004, Koloff returned to the ring for the first time in 10 years. He wrestled in the independent circuit. On August 27, 2005, Koloff defeated Dominic DeNucci in a Russian chain match at WrestleReunion. Koloff would win his final wrestling title defeating The Barbarian in a Russian chain match for the Legends title at NWA Charlotte. On July 19, 2013, Koloff lost to Shane Douglas in an Extreme Rules match at Mega Pro. His final match was against Bob Armstrong in which Armstrong won on November 16, 2013, at Superstars of Wrestling 1 in Rome, Georgia. Koloff stood around 5 feet 9 inches (1.75 m) tall, and weighed approximately 300 pounds (140 kg) when he was at the peak of his career as a wrestler but Towards the end of his career, he dropped a considerable amount of weight and was tipping the scale at 205 pounds (93 kg).

== Personal life ==
Perras wrote a book titled Is That Wrestling Fake? The Bear Facts that was released on January 1, 2007. He became a born-again Christian in 1995 and traveled to churches to share his testimony as an ordained minister. Koloff spoke openly and candidly of his conversion to Christianity and struggles with alcohol and drugs and the crazy days of wrestling in his 2014 book, Life in the Trenches. Perras was named as a defendant in a 2015 lawsuit filed by WWE after they received a letter from him indicating that he intended to sue them for concussion-based injuries sustained during his tenure with them. He was represented by attorney Konstantine Kyros, who is involved in several other lawsuits involving former WWE wrestlers. The lawsuit was dismissed in September 2018.

He had five children... Doreal Perras being the eldest, followed by Kirsty Donaldson, Donald Perras and Elizabeth Perras Phillips. His youngest daughter Rachel Marley is a singer.

== Death ==
Perras died at his home in Winterville, North Carolina, on February 18, 2017, from liver cancer.

== Other media ==
Koloff is featured as a playable character in the video games Legends of Wrestling, Legends of Wrestling II and Showdown: Legends of Wrestling.

== Championships and accomplishments ==
- American Championship Wrestling
  - ACW United States Championship (1 time)
- Atlantic Coast Wrestling
  - ACW Tag Team Championship (1 time) – with Vladimir Koloff
- Cauliflower Alley Club
  - Iron Mike Mazurki Award (2013)
- Championship Wrestling from Florida
  - NWA Florida Tag Team Championship (5 times) – with Pat Patterson (1), Masa Saito (3), and Nikolai Volkoff (1)
  - NWA Southern Heavyweight Championship (Florida version) (1 time)
- Coastal Real Extreme Wrestling
  - CREW Heavyweight Championship (1 time)
- CWF Mid-Atlantic
  - CWF Mid-Atlantic Tag Team Championship (1 time) – with Sean Powers
- George Tragos/Lou Thesz Professional Wrestling Hall of Fame
  - Frank Gotch Award (2009)
- Georgia Championship Wrestling
  - NWA Georgia Tag Team Championship (7 times) – with Ole Anderson (5), and Alexis Smirnoff (2)
- Great Lakes Wrestling Association
  - GLWA United States Heavyweight Championship (1 time)
- High Volume Pro Wrestling
  - HVPW Hall of Fame (2014)
- International Wrestling Enterprise
  - IWA World Tag Team Championship (1 time) – with Maurice Vachon
- International Wrestling Association (Montreal)
  - IWA International Heavyweight Championship (1 time)
- Maple Leaf Wrestling
  - NWA Canadian Heavyweight Championship (Toronto version) (1 time)
  - NWA Television Championship (Toronto version) (2 times)
- Masterz of Mayhem
  - MoM USWA North American Heavyweight Championship (1 time)
- Mid-Atlantic Championship Wrestling/Jim Crockett Promotions
  - NWA Mid-Atlantic Heavyweight Championship (3 times)
  - NWA Mid-Atlantic Tag Team Championship (1 time) – with Don Kernodle
  - NWA Mid-Atlantic Television Championship (2 times)
  - NWA Television Championship (3 times)
  - NWA United States Tag Team Championship (2 times) – with Krusher Khruschev (1), Dick Murdoch (1)
  - NWA World Six-Man Tag Team Championship (2 times) – with Nikita Koloff and Krusher Khruschev (Baron von Raschke with Krusher injured) (1), The Barbarian and The Warlord (1)
  - NWA World Tag Team Championship (Mid Atlantic version) (5 times) – with Nikita Koloff (1), Nikita Koloff and Krusher Khruschev (1), Ray Stevens (1), Don Kernodle (1), and Manny Fernandez (1) (substituting for Rick Rude who had left for the WWF)
  - NWA United States Tag Team Championship Tournament (1986) – with Krusher Khruschev
- Mid-Atlantic Wrestling Alliance
  - MAWA Heavyweight Championship (1 time)
- NWA Charlotte
  - NWA Charlotte Legends Championship (1 time)
- Professional Wrestling Hall of Fame and Museum
  - (Class of 2011)
- Southern Championship Wrestling
  - SCW Hall of Fame (Class of 1999)
- St. Louis Wrestling Hall of Fame
  - Class of 2024
- Virginia Wrestling Association
  - VWA Heavyweight Championship (1 time)
- Western Ohio Wrestling
  - WOW International Heavyweight Championship (1 time)
- World Wide Wrestling Federation / WWE
  - WWWF World Heavyweight Championship (1 time)
  - WWE Hall of Fame (Class of 2025 – Legacy wing)
- World Wrestling Association
  - WWA World Heavyweight Championship (1 time)
- World Wrestling Council
  - WWC Puerto Rico Heavyweight Championship (1 time)
- Wrestling Observer Newsletter
  - Wrestling Observer Newsletter Hall of Fame (Class of 2015)
