= Halloween Havoc (1992) =

World Championship Wrestling pay-per-view event

- VHS cover featuring Sting
- Promotion: World Championship Wrestling
- Date: October 25, 1992
- City: Philadelphia, Pennsylvania
- Venue: Philadelphia Civic Center
- Attendance: 7,000
- Buy rate: 165,000
- Tagline: Spin the Wheel, Make the Deal

Pay-per-view chronology
← Previous; The Great American Bash	Next → Starrcade

Halloween Havoc chronology
← Previous; 1991	Next → 1993

The 1992 Halloween Havoc was the fourth annual Halloween Havoc professional wrestling pay-per-view (PPV) event produced by World Championship Wrestling (WCW). It took place on October 25, 1992, from the Philadelphia Civic Center in Philadelphia, Pennsylvania in the United States — this was the second Halloween Havoc held at this venue after the inaugural event in 1989.

Eight matches were contested at the event, including one dark match. The main event saw Sting defeat Jake Roberts in a Coal Miner's Glove match. In other prominent matches, Ron Simmons successfully defended his WCW World Heavyweight Championship against The Barbarian, Masahiro Chono lost by disqualification to Rick Rude to retain the NWA World Heavyweight Championship, and Barry Windham and Dustin Rhodes fought Steve Austin and Steve Williams to a time-limit draw for both the NWA and WCW World Tag Team Championships.

== Production ==
Halloween Havoc was an annual professional wrestling pay-per-view event produced by World Championship Wrestling (WCW) since 1989. As the name implies, it was a Halloween-themed show held in October. The 1992 event was the fourth event in the Halloween Havoc chronology and it took place on October 25, 1992, from the Philadelphia Civic Center in Philadelphia, Pennsylvania. This was the second Halloween Havoc held at this venue after the inaugural 1989 event.

The event featured professional wrestling matches that involve different wrestlers from pre-existing scripted feuds and storylines. Professional wrestlers portray villains, heroes, or less distinguishable characters in the scripted events that build tension and culminate in a wrestling match or series of matches.

== Event ==
Other on-screen personnel
Role:	Name:
Presenters	Tony Schiavone
Presenters	Bruno Sammartino
Commentator	Jim Ross
Commentator	Jesse Ventura
Interviewer	Missy Hyatt
Interviewer	Teddy Long
Ring announcer	Gary Michael Cappetta
Referees	Mike Adkins
Referees	Randy Anderson
Referees	Nick Patrick
Referees	Ole Anderson; Senior referee
Referees	Kensuke Sasaki; Chono vs. Rude
Referees	Harley Race; Chono vs. Rude

In a dark match, that did not air on pay-per-view, Erik Watts and Van Hammer defeated the Vegas Connection (Diamond Dallas Page and Vinnie Vegas).

The pay-per-view broadcast opened with a six man tag team match in which Johnny Gunn, Shane Douglas, and Tom Zenk defeated Arn Anderson, Michael Hayes, and Bobby Eaton. The match ended when Zenk delivered a superkick to Hayes and then Gunn gave him a Thesz Press, enabling Gunn to pin Hayes. Although Douglas, Gunn, and Zenk were the faces going into the match, they were vigorously booed by the Philadelphia audience, resulting in Douglas and Gunn working as heels.

Next, Brian Pillman faced Ricky Steamboat. The match ended when Steamboat attempted to perform a sunset flip, but Pillman was able to reverse it and attempted to roll-up Steamboat. Steamboat was in turn able to reverse this and pin Pillman.

The third match was a no disqualification match, in which Big Van Vader defended the WCW United States Heavyweight Championship against Nikita Koloff on behalf of Rick Rude (Rude, the incumbent champion, had complained about having to wrestle twice). Rude, Harley Race, and Madusa were barred from ringside. The match saw Vader squash Koloff; it ended when Koloff missed a Russian Sickle (lariat), enabling Vader to deliver a powerbomb to Koloff and pin him. During the match, Koloff sustained a herniated disc in his neck from a stiff clothesline from Vader, leading him to retire.

Next, Barry Windham and Dustin Rhodes defended both the NWA World Tag Team Championship and the WCW World Tag Team Championship against Steve Austin and Steve Williams. The match was originally scheduled to be Steve Williams and Terry Gordy defending against the Steiner Brothers, but this was changed after Rick Steiner suffered a torn chest muscle during a Japanese tour, resulting in Rhodes and Windham winning the titles from Gordy and Williams on the October 3, 1992 episode of WCW Saturday Night. Gordy and Williams then challenged Rhodes and Windham to a rematch for the titles, with Austin substituting for Gordy after he no-showed the event. Austin and Williams initially won the match after Austin pinned Windham, the illegal man. Original referee Randy Anderson thus overturned Nick Patrick's decision and restarted the match, which ended in a time limit draw after 30 minutes.

In the fifth match, Masahiro Chono defended his NWA World Heavyweight Championship against Rick Rude. Both competitors were able to choose their own guest referee for the match, with Chono choosing Kensuke Sasaki and Rude choosing Harley Race. Prior to the match, Ole Anderson flipped a coin which determined that Race would be inside the ring while Sasaki would be outside. The match ended when Chono was disqualified by Race for throwing Rude over the top rope, enabling him to retain the title despite losing the match.

Next, WCW World Heavyweight Champion Ron Simmons defended his title against The Barbarian. The match ended when Simmons powerslammed The Barbarian and then pinned him.

In the main event, Jake Roberts faced Sting in a "Spin the Wheel, Make the Deal" match; the match type was determined by Sting spinning a wheel of fortune earlier in the evening, resulting in a coal miner's glove match. Other potential options were a barbed wire match, a cage match, a dog collar match, a first blood match, an "I quit" match, a Lumberjacks with belts match, a Prince of Darkness match, a Russian chain match, a Texas bullrope match, a Texas death match and an option allowing Sting to choose the match type. The match ended when Sting retrieved the coal miner's glove and struck Roberts with it; Roberts was bitten by a snake he was holding, which allowed Sting to pin him.

== Home media and streaming ==
Although not broadcast live in the UK, the event was released on home video by Turner Home Entertainment in the spring of 1993. The event was edited down to two hours and the opening match was cut from the release.

In 2014, the event was included on the WWE's streaming platform the WWE Network as part of its launch and remained on the service until the platform closed in 2026. In October 2026, WWE uploaded the event to stream freely on their WCW YouTube channel.

== Results ==
No.	Results	Stipulations	Times
1^{D}	Erik Watts and Van Hammer defeated the Vegas Connection (Diamond Dallas Page and Vinnie Vegas)	Tag team match	12:00
2	Johnny Gunn, Shane Douglas, and Tom Zenk defeated Arn Anderson, Bobby Eaton, and Michael Hayes	Six-man tag team match	11:02
3	Ricky Steamboat defeated Brian Pillman	Singles match	10:25
4	Big Van Vader defeated Nikita Koloff	Singles match	11:35
5	Barry Windham and Dustin Rhodes (c) vs. Steve Austin and Steve Williams ended in a time-limit draw	Tag team match for the unified (NWA and WCW) World Tag Team Championships	30:00
6	Rick Rude (with Madusa) defeated Masahiro Chono (c) (with Hiro Matsuda) by disqualification	Singles match for the NWA World Heavyweight Championship	22:23
7	Ron Simmons (c) defeated The Barbarian (with Cactus Jack)	Singles match for the WCW World Heavyweight Championship	12:41
8	Sting defeated Jake Roberts	Coal Miner's Glove match	10:34
(c) / – the champion(s) heading into the match; D / – this was a dark match
