= NXT: Halloween Havoc (2021) =

WWE television special

NXT Halloween Havoc
- Official event logo
- Promotion: WWE
- Brand: NXT 2.0
- Date: October 26, 2021
- City: Orlando, Florida
- Venue: WWE Performance Center

NXT special episodes chronology
← Previous; The Great American Bash	Next → New Year's Evil

Halloween Havoc chronology
← Previous; 2020	Next → 2022

The 2021 NXT: Halloween Havoc was a professional wrestling television special produced by WWE, held exclusively for wrestlers from the promotion's developmental brand, NXT 2.0. It was WWE's second annual NXT Halloween Havoc, and the 14th Halloween Havoc overall, and aired as a special episode of the weekly series NXT 2.0 on the USA Network. The event took place on October 26, 2021, at NXT's home venue, the WWE Performance Center in Orlando, Florida for a second consecutive year. The show was hosted by Chucky in a crosspromotion for the Chucky TV series, with NXT wrestlers Grayson Waller and LA Knight also serving as hosts.

Six matches were contested at the event. In the main event, Tommaso Ciampa defeated Bron Breakker to retain the NXT Championship. This event was also notable for the start of Toxic Attraction's reign over the "2.0 era" of NXT. At the event, the group's leader Mandy Rose defeated Raquel González to win the NXT Women's Championship, beginning her 413-day reign as champion, while the other members, Gigi Dolin and Jacy Jayne, won a Triple Threat Tag Team Scareway to Hell Ladder match to win the NXT Women's Tag Team Championship. Dolin and Jayne would become two-time tag team champions for a combined 249 days. The event was also notable for the WWE debut of Solo Sikoa.

== Production ==
=== Background ===
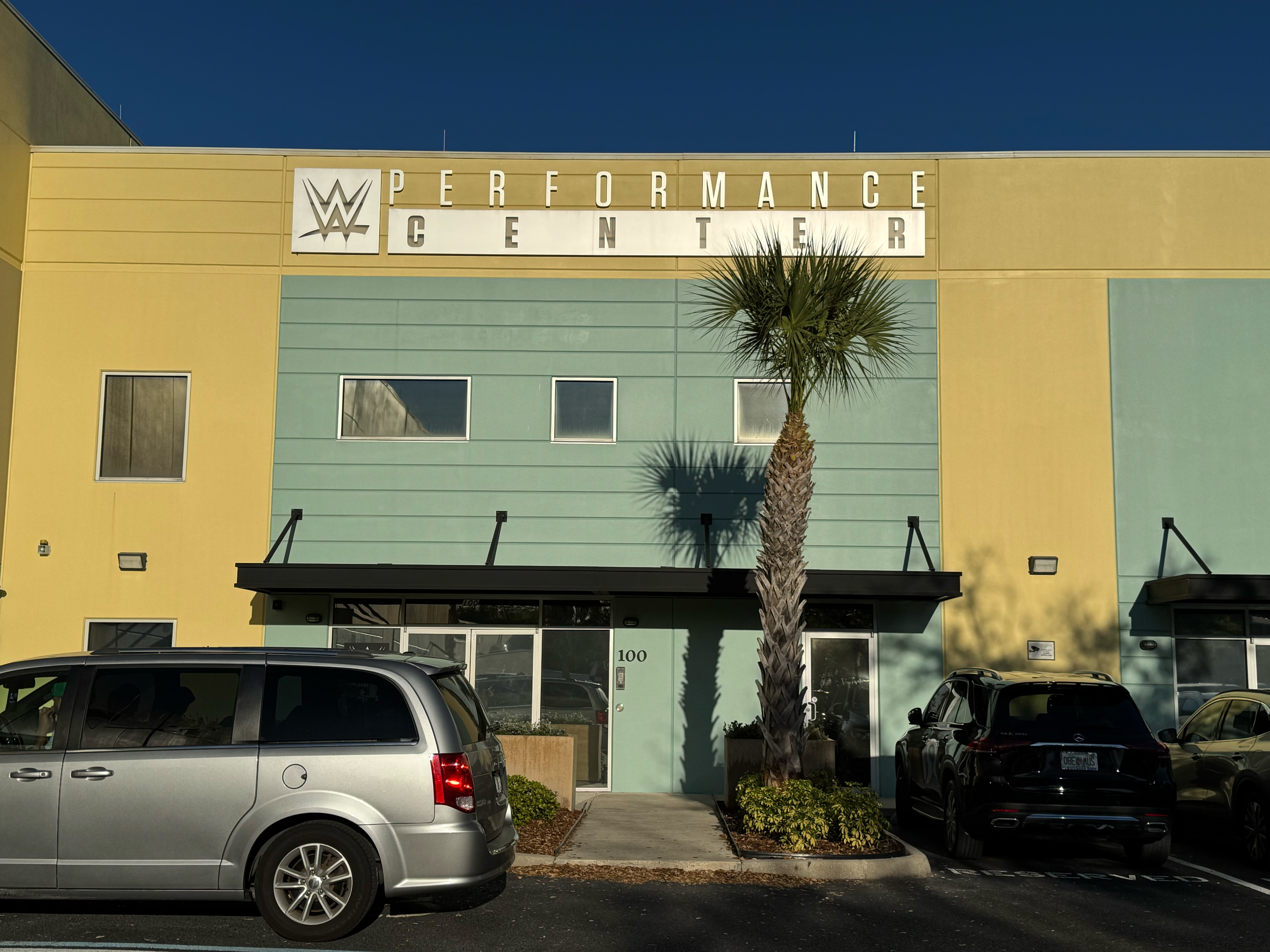
NXT's second annual Halloween Havoc was held at the brand's home venue, the WWE Performance Center in Orlando, Florida for a second consecutive year.

Halloween Havoc is a professional wrestling event established in 1989, held in October as part of the month's Halloween festivities. It was originally produced as an annual pay-per-view (PPV) event by the former World Championship Wrestling (WCW) from 1989 until 2000. Following WWE's acquisition of WCW in March 2001, WWE reinstated Halloween Havoc as a television special for its developmental brand, NXT 2.0, in 2020.

On the October 5, 2021, episode of NXT 2.0, it was announced by NXT wrestler Tommaso Ciampa that Halloween Havoc would be making its return to NXT as another television special on the USA Network, thus becoming an annual event for NXT. The brand's second Halloween Havoc, and 14th overall, was scheduled to take place on October 26, 2021, at NXT's home venue, the WWE Performance Center in Orlando, Florida for a second consecutive year.

=== Storylines ===
The card included matches that resulted from scripted storylines. Results were predetermined by WWE's writers on the NXT brand, while storylines were produced on the weekly television program, NXT.

At the beginning of the September 14 episode of NXT (which was also the first episode of NXT since the brand got revamped to "NXT 2.0"), Bron Breakker made his debut and defeated LA Knight. Later on the same night, Tommaso Ciampa captured the vacant NXT Championship by defeating Pete Dunne, Knight and Von Wagner in a fatal four-way match. On the October 5 episode of NXT, Breakker challenged Ciampa to a match for the championship at Halloween Havoc, which Ciampa accepted. On the October 12 episode, Ciampa took on Joe Gacy under the stipulation that if Gacy won, he would be added to the NXT Championship match. Ciampa defeated Gacy, keeping it a singles match.

On the October 12 episode of NXT, after Indi Hartwell and Persia Pirotta's match, they staked their claims for the NXT Women's Tag Team Championship, after which, Io Shirai and Zoey Stark and Toxic Attraction (Gigi Dolin and Jacy Jayne) showed up and started brawling. Later, William Regal decided that at Halloween Havoc, Shirai and Stark would defend their titles against Toxic Attraction and Hartwell and Pirotta in a Spin The Wheel, Make the Deal triple threat tag team match. The following week, Shirai defeated Jayne and Pirotta to earn the right to choose the match's stipulation, which was a Scareway to Hell match.

On the October 19 episode of NXT, after Imperium's (Fabian Aichner and Marcel Barthel) tag team match, MSK (Wes Lee and Nash Carter) showed up and gave Imperium a tag team title shot at Halloween Havoc.

On the September 28 episode of NXT, after Raquel González's successful NXT Women's Championship defense, Toxic Attraction (Mandy Rose, Gigi Dolin, and Jacy Jayne) showed up and attacked González. The following week, a Spin the Wheel, Make the Deal match between González and Rose for the NXT Women's Championship was scheduled for Halloween Havoc.

== Event ==
Other on-screen personnel
Role:	Name:
Hosts	Chucky
Hosts	LA Knight
Hosts	Grayson Waller
Commentators	Vic Joseph
Commentators	Wade Barrett
Commentators	Beth Phoenix
Spanish commentators	Carlos Cabrera
Spanish commentators	Marcelo Rodríguez
Ring announcer	Alicia Taylor
Referees	Darryl Sharma
Referees	Dallas Irvin
Referees	Daphne Lashaunn
Referees	Derek Sanders
Referees	Blair Baldwin
Referees	Felix Fernandez
Pre-show panel	Sam Roberts
Pre-show panel	McKenzie Mitchell
Pre-show panel	Denise Salcedo

=== Preliminary matches ===
The television special began with Io Shirai and Zoey Stark defending the NXT Women's Tag Team Championship against Toxic Attraction (Gigi Dolin and Jacy Jayne) and Indi Hartwell and Persia Pirotta in a Triple Threat Tag Team Scareway to Hell Ladder match. During the match, Pirotta tipped a ladder over, causing Stark to take out Dolin, Jayne, and Hartwell outside of the ring. Pirotta then prevented everyone else from retrieving the title belts, even powerbombing Dolin onto a ladder. Jayne touched one of the title belts, and countered a powerbomb from Pirotta into a hurricanrana into another ladder. Shirai pulled Jayne off a ladder onto another ladder and performed a Moonsault on Jayne onto it. After taking out Pirotta, Stark was on the receiving end of a Spinebuster onto a ladder by Hartwell. In the climax, as Shirai was at the top of a ladder, Hartwell tipped it over, causing Shirai to crash into another ladder outside the ring. Jayne distracted Hartwell enough for Dolin to get to the top of the ladder and push Hartwell off. Dolin then retrieved the belts to win the titles for Toxic Attraction for the first time.

Following this, Trick Williams and NXT North American Champion Carmelo Hayes pulled up to a haunted house, while Johnny Gargano and Dexter Lumis were in a security room. After Hayes and Williams mistaked a dead kid for Gargano, they entered the house.

Next, Grayson Waller, dressed as a vampire, introduced the audience to Halloween Havoc, only to be interrupted by Joe Gacy, who came for his match against Malik Blade. In the end, Harland appeared and grabbed Blade by the throat outside the ring, and back inside, Gacy performed a handspring clothesline to win the match.

In the third match, Diamond Mine issued an open challenge, which was accepted by Odyssey Jones, who chose to face NXT Cruiserweight Champion Roderick Strong in a non-title match. Jones dominated most of the match. In the end, The Creed Brothers (Brutus Creed and Julius Creed) distracted Jones, allowing Strong to perform a Jumping Knee to win the match.

Following this, a Halloween party took place backstage, where Xyon Quinn chokeslammed Robert Stone through a table.

In the fourth match, Raquel González defended the NXT Women's Championship against Mandy Rose in a Spin the Wheel, Make the Deal match. González entered the Performance Center on a motorcycle, and spun the wheel, which landed on "Chucky's Choice". Chucky chose a Trick or Street Fight. Outside the ring, Rose attacked González with a kendo stick, but González fought back and sent Rose into the plexiglass. Later, González attacked Rose with another kendo stick. Rose fought back and placed González onto a chair before using the kendo stick to trap her. González put on a hockey mask and used a fire extinguisher on Rose. González then sent Rose into the chairs set up on the top turnbuckle for a nearfall. González then set up the steel steps on the ring apron, but Rose tossed her into them for a nearfall. In the closing moments, González sent Rose through a table positioned in the corner for a nearfall. A hooded person then struck González with a shovel, allowing Rose to perform a Bicycle Knee on González to win the title for the first time, meaning that Toxic Attraction held all of the women's championships on the NXT brand. Afterwards, the hooded person was revealed to be Dakota Kai.

Following this, Carmelo Hayes and Trick Williams walked around the haunted house, where they punched a "monster" before being scared at creepy people. Andre Chase then appeared and led Hayes and Williams through the house. Afterwards, Johnny Gargano and Dexter Lumis left the security room and put the NXT Zombie in charge. Chase was then eaten by zombies. Later, Gargano and Lumis attacked Williams and Hayes, who fended off the zombies. They ran away when Gargano scared them. Gargano then said that next time, they're doing the party.

Afterwards, Grayson Waller continued to host the show until LA Knight, also dressed as a vampire, interrupted. Solo Sikoa then made his NXT debut, and caused Knight and Waller to retreat.

In the penultimate match, MSK (Wes Lee and Nash Carter) defended the NXT Tag Team Championship against Imperium (Fabian Aichner and Marcel Barthel) in a Spin the Wheel, Make the Deal match. A random child spun the wheel, which landed on "Lumberjack O'Lantern Match". Carter and Lee performed stereo dives on Aichner and Barthel. Aichner performed a rolling senton on Carter and Lee. Lee leapt over the ring post onto Aichner and the lumberjacks. Carter then sent himself and Aichner onto the lumberjacks. Afterwards, all of the lumberjacks were sent to the back. In the closing moments, Carter performed a Hot Fire Flame on Barthel for a nearfall. Barthel performed a running PK on Carter. Aichner performed a Brainbuster on Lee, and he and Barthel performed the European Bomb on Lee to win the titles.

=== Main event ===
In the main event, Tommaso Ciampa defended the NXT Championship against Bron Breakker. Breakker attempted a crossbody, but Ciampa avoided it. Ciampa attempted a leapfrog, but Breakker countered into a spinebuster. Ciampa performed Willow's Bell on Breakker for a nearfall. Breakker then performed a standing Frankensteiner and attempted a Military Press Powerslam, but Ciampa countered into a DDT. Outside the ring, Breakker attempted to suplex Ciampa onto the exposed concrete, but Ciampa countered into a DDT onto the concrete. Back inside the ring, Ciampa performed a Fairytale Ending for a nearfall. In the end, Ciampa performed three running knees and a second Fairytale Ending on Breakker to retain the title. Ciampa then hugged the title belt as the event ended.

== Reception ==
John Moore of Pro Wrestling Dot Net praised both women's title bouts, calling the Scareway to Hell match a "very fun ladder match to watch" and gave credit to González and Rose for making the Trick or Street Fight "an entertaining WWE-style hardcore match." He called the NXT Tag Title match a "well wrestled tag team title match" and felt the NXT Championship main event had "really good storytelling" and didn't hotshot the title onto Breakker to tell "a longer form story." Moore concluded that, "Overall this was a solid NXT 2.0 show. This [show] and the one from two weeks ago were the two best episodes. This one did have a lot of noteworthy moments with the multiple title changes ... I hope that WWE hasn't given up on doing NXT Takeovers because even though they can produce good theme shows like this one, Takeovers are something different and special. Have Breakker win his title at a Takeover." Matthew McFarlin of Slam Wrestling gave the event 3.5 out of 5 stars, saying: "Gimmicks and goofiness come with the terms of WWE Halloween specials, and it's always hit or miss. Trick Williams and Carmelo Hayes' haunted house mini-movie? Hit (because Hayes "never misses"). Giving the women's division to Toxic Attraction? Miss. But at any rate, the matches delivered, and the main event was very impressive. Bron Breakker with experience will be unstoppable.

== Aftermath ==
New NXT Women's Champion Mandy Rose opened the following episode of NXT to talk about her championship win. The other members of Toxic Attraction, NXT Women's Tag Team Champions Gigi Dolin and Jacy Jayne, attacked Zoey Stark in the locker room. It was then reported that Stark suffered a legitimate torn ACL and meniscus during the attack, which she underwent successful surgery for. Also on that same episode, Io Shirai interrupted and said that she didn't like Stark, but liked Rose less. Shirai and Rose were scheduled for a match, but Rose attacked Shirai before the match began. Shirai fought back, but Dolin and Jayne joined the fray, joining Rose in beating up Shirai until Kacy Catanzaro and Kayden Carter made the save, causing Toxic Attraction to retreat. This led to a six-woman tag team match for the following week where Toxic Attraction defeated Shirai, Catanzaro, and Carter.

Also on the following episode of NXT, Bron Breakker accepted Andre Chase's open challenge and defeated Chase in under two minutes. Following the match, Breakker said that NXT Champion Tommaso Ciampa was the man, but also said that Breakker would either win the NXT Championship or die trying. Breakker would earn another shot at the title after pinning Ciampa in a WarGames match to win the match for his team at NXT WarGames. The match was scheduled for NXT: New Year's Evil, where Breakker defeated Ciampa to win the title for the first time.

After losing the NXT Tag Team Championship to Imperium (Fabian Aichner and Marcel Barthel) at Halloween Havoc, MSK (Wes Lee and Nash Carter) spent the month of November going on a journey to find the legend of MSK called "The Shaman". On the December 7 episode of NXT, The Shaman was revealed to be Raw roster member and Raw Tag Team Champion Riddle, who helped them find themselves on their way to regaining the tag titles. On the December 28 episode, MSK returned and called out Imperium, who said they were the best tag team in the division. Walter then appeared on the TitanTron and said that Imperium showed "dignity and respect" to the tag titles, and MSK did not deserve a title match but a beating from his hands. Riddle then appeared on the TitanTron and proposed a six-man tag team match between him and MSK against Imperium, which Walter accepted.

For costing Raquel González the NXT Women's Championship, Dakota Kai took on González on the November 16 episode of NXT. The match ended in a disqualification win for González after interference from Toxic Attraction (NXT Women's Champion Mandy Rose and NXT Women's Tag Team Champions Gigi Dolin and Jacy Jayne). Afterwards, Cora Jade attacked Dolin and Jayne, only for Rose to overpower her. Io Shirai then grabbed a crutch from the injured Zoey Stark and attacked Kai and Toxic Attraction with it, sending them retreating. This led to a WarGames match pitting Jade, Shirai, and González against Toxic Attraction and Kai being scheduled for NXT WarGames. The following week, Kay Lee Ray was added to Shirai's team after causing Rose to lose to Jade in a non-title match. At NXT WarGames, González, Shirai, Ray, and Jade defeated Toxic Attraction and Kai when Jade made the pin. González then defeated Kai in a street fight on the December 21 episode to end their feud. González was subsequently scheduled to face Rose for the NXT Women's Championship at NXT: New Year's Evil in a triple threat match also involving Jade.

After being slammed through a table during the Halloween party at Halloween Havoc, Robert Stone took on Xyon Quinn and lost in less than a minute.

After what occurred in the haunted house at Halloween Havoc, Carmelo Hayes and Trick Williams took on Johnny Gargano and Dexter Lumis in a winning effort.

After Solo Sikoa sent hosts LA Knight and Grayson Waller retreating at Halloween Havoc, a triple threat match between the three took place on the November 9 episode of NXT where Sikoa won.

While the 2020 and 2021 Halloween Havoc events were held as television specials of the NXT program, the 2022 event was made a livestreaming event, airing on Peacock in the United States and the WWE Network in international markets. The 2023 event returned the show to being a television special but expanded to a two-part special.

== Results ==
No.	Results	Stipulations	Times
1	Toxic Attraction (Gigi Dolin and Jacy Jayne) defeated Io Shirai and Zoey Stark (c) and Indi Hartwell and Persia Pirotta	Spin the Wheel, Make the Deal: Triple threat tag team Scareway to Hell Ladder match for the NXT Women's Tag Team Championship	12:22
2	Joe Gacy (with Harland) defeated Malik Blade by pinfall	Singles match	2:10
3	Roderick Strong (with Diamond Mine) defeated Odyssey Jones by pinfall	Singles match	3:56
4	Mandy Rose defeated Raquel González (c) by pinfall	Spin the Wheel, Make the Deal: Chucky's choice - Trick or Street Fight match for the NXT Women's Championship	11:53
5	Imperium (Fabian Aichner and Marcel Barthel) defeated MSK (Nash Carter and Wes Lee) (c) by pinfall	Spin the Wheel, Make the Deal: Lumber Jack-o'-Lantern match for the NXT Tag Team Championship	13:10
6	Tommaso Ciampa (c) defeated Bron Breakker by pinfall	Singles match for the NXT Championship	13:49
(c) / – the champion(s) heading into the match
