= NXT Halloween Havoc (2022) =

WWE premium live event

- Promotional poster featuring Ilja Dragunov, Bron Breakker, JD McDonagh, Mandy Rose, and Alba Fyre
- Promotion: WWE
- Brand: NXT
- Date: October 22, 2022
- City: Orlando, Florida
- Venue: WWE Performance Center

WWE event chronology
← Previous; Extreme Rules	Next → Crown Jewel

Halloween Havoc chronology
← Previous; 2021	Next → 2023

NXT major events chronology
← Previous; Worlds Collide	Next → Deadline

The 2022 NXT Halloween Havoc was a professional wrestling premium live event (PLE) produced by WWE, held for wrestlers from the promotion's developmental brand, NXT. It was WWE's third annual NXT Halloween Havoc and the 15th Halloween Havoc overall. The event took place on Saturday, October 22, 2022, at NXT's home venue, the WWE Performance Center in Orlando, Florida for a third consecutive year. SmackDown wrestler Shotzi returned to co-host the event with NXT wrestler Quincy Elliott. In a cross-promotion with the Chucky television series, Chucky returned to participate in the Spin the Wheel, Make the Deal segments.

Unlike the previous two years, which aired as a television special of the weekly NXT program, the 2022 Halloween Havoc aired via WWE's livestreaming platforms, marking the first Halloween Havoc to air on Peacock in the United States, SonyLIV in India, Disney+ Hotstar in Indonesia, and the WWE Network in other international markets. It was in turn the first Halloween Havoc to be branded as a "premium live event", a term the company introduced at the start of the year to refer to its events airing on traditional pay-per-view and via the livestreaming platforms. This was also the second time for Shotzi to host, after previously hosting the 2020 event when she was still on NXT. It was also NXT's first PLE since the brand reverted back to its original "NXT" name the previous month, after it had been promoted as "NXT 2.0" since September 2021.

There were six matches scheduled on the event's card, as well as two dark matches that occurred before the live broadcast. In the main event, Bron Breakker defeated Ilja Dragunov and JD McDonagh in a triple threat match to retain the NXT Championship. In other prominent matches, Mandy Rose defeated Alba Fyre to retain the NXT Women's Championship, and in the opening bout, Wes Lee defeated Carmelo Hayes, Oro Mensah, Von Wagner, and Nathan Frazer in a five-way ladder match to win the vacant NXT North American Championship.

== Production ==
=== Background ===
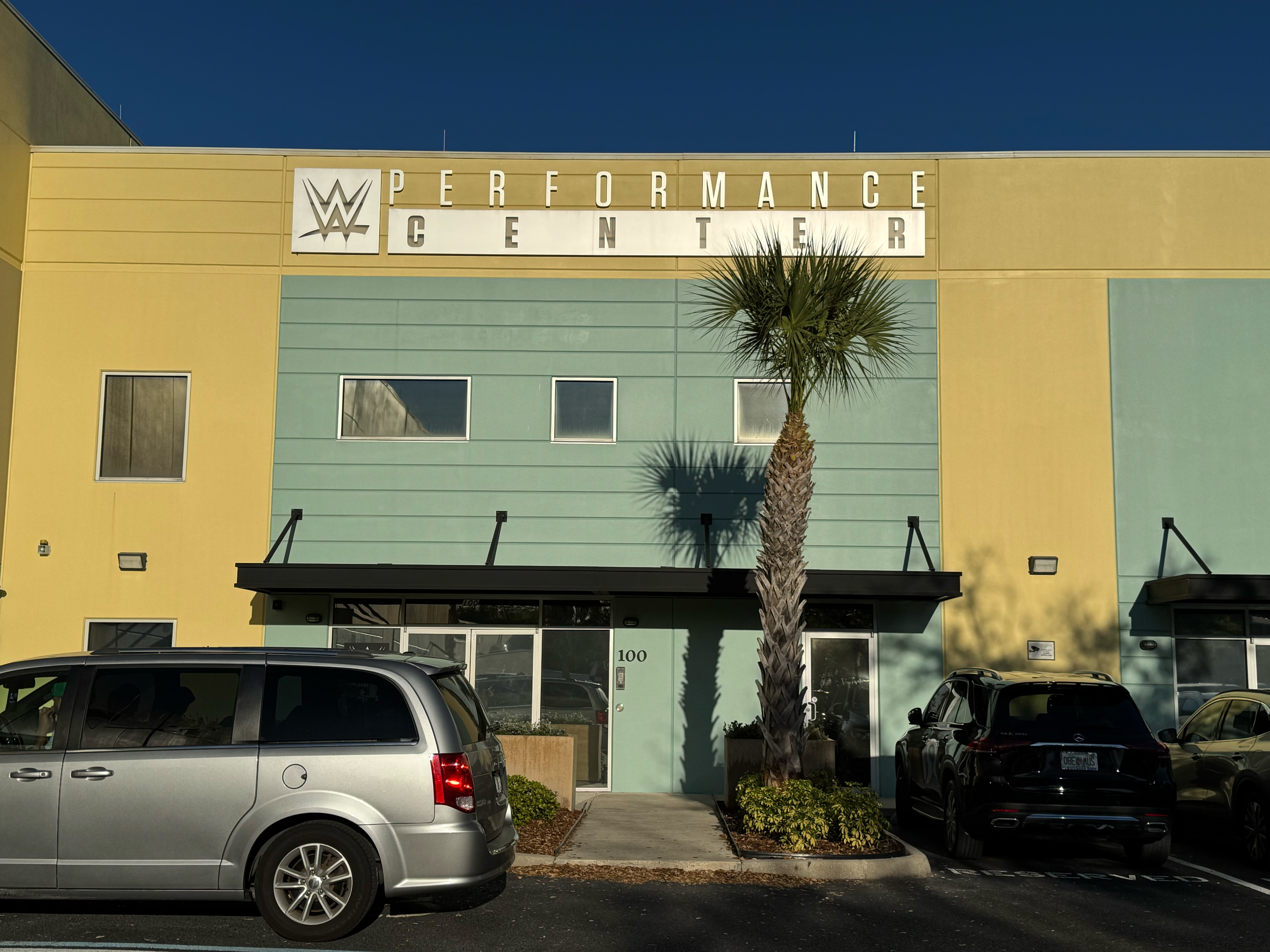
NXT's third annual Halloween Havoc was held at the brand's home venue, the WWE Performance Center in Orlando, Florida for a third consecutive year.

Halloween Havoc is a professional wrestling event established in 1989, held in October as part of the month's Halloween festivities. It was originally produced as an annual pay-per-view (PPV) event by the former World Championship Wrestling (WCW) from 1989 until 2000. Following WWE's acquisition of WCW in March 2001, WWE reinstated Halloween Havoc as an annual event for its developmental brand, NXT, in 2020, with both the 2020 and 2021 events held as a television special of the weekly NXT television program.

NXT's third Halloween Havoc, and 15th overall, was scheduled for Saturday, October 22, 2022, at NXT's home venue, the WWE Performance Center in Orlando, Florida for a third consecutive year. Unlike the prior two years, the 2022 event was scheduled to be held as a premium live event (PLE), marking the first Halloween Havoc to broadcast on WWE's livestreaming platforms: Peacock in the United States, SonyLIV in India, Disney+ Hotstar in Indonesia, and the WWE Network everywhere else. This was subsequently the first Halloween Havoc to be branded as a "premium live event", a term the company introduced on January 1 to refer to its events that are available on PPV and via livestreaming. This would also be NXT's first PLE held since the brand reverted back to its original name of "NXT" the previous month after it had been promoted as "NXT 2.0" since September 2021.

After serving as the host of the 2020 event, it was announced that SmackDown wrestler Shotzi would return to NXT to host the 2022 Halloween Havoc. NXT wrestler Quincy Elliott earned the right to co-host the event with Shotzi after defeating Xyon Quinn in a match on the October 18 episode of NXT.

=== Storylines ===
The card included six matches, as well as two dark matches before the live broadcast, that resulted from scripted storylines. Results were predetermined by WWE's writers on the NXT brand, while storylines were produced on WWE's weekly television program, NXT, and the supplementary online streaming show, Level Up.

At Heatwave on August 16, Bron Breakker defeated JD McDonagh to retain the NXT Championship and then defeated Tyler Bate at Worlds Collide to unify the NXT United Kingdom Championship into the NXT Championship. During this time, McDonagh would continuously taunt Breakker and the NXT Championship. On the September 20 episode of NXT, McDonagh defeated Bate to earn another title match against Breakker. Following the match, McDonagh was confronted by both Breakker and a returning Ilja Dragunov, a previous holder of the United Kingdom Championship but had to vacate it due to injury. The following week, during another confrontation between the three, Breakker suggested a triple threat match for the NXT Championship, which was made official for Halloween Havoc.

After defeating Carmelo Hayes to win the NXT North American Championship on the September 13 episode of NXT, Solo Sikoa, who replaced Wes Lee due to an attack by Hayes and Trick Williams, was informed by Shawn Michaels that he was stripped of the title because he was not sanctioned to compete in the match. After Sikoa was called up to the main roster on SmackDown after debuting at Clash at the Castle two weeks prior, it was announced that Hayes and four other challengers would compete in a ladder match for the vacant championship. That same episode, Oro Mensah became the first to qualify by defeating Grayson Waller. Over the next few weeks, Lee qualified by defeating Tony D'Angelo, Von Wagner qualified by defeating Andre Chase, and Nathan Frazer qualified by defeating Axiom, which also served as the final match of their best of three series.

On the September 13 episode of NXT, while Toxic Attraction (Mandy Rose, Gigi Dolin, and Jacy Jayne) were celebrating one year of dominance over NXT's "2.0 era", they were interrupted by Alba Fyre, who challenged Rose for the NXT Women's Championship. After Fyre played mind games with Rose over the next few weeks, including kidnapping her in the parking lot, the match was made official for Halloween Havoc.

After Cora Jade and Roxanne Perez won the NXT Women's Tag Team Championship at NXT: The Great American Bash on July 5, Perez announced that she would cash in her NXT Women's Breakout Tournament contract for an NXT Women's Championship match the following week, but failed to win the title due to Jade turning on Perez, turning heel and disbanding their team. As a result, the NXT Women's Tag Team Championship was vacated. Jade then defeated Perez at NXT: Heatwave on August 16. On the October 4 episode of NXT, Jade and Perez were the guests on the Waller Effect, hosted by Grayson Waller, where Waller announced that a rematch between the two at Halloween Havoc would be a Spin the Wheel, Make the Deal match. Waller then spun the wheel with it landing on a Weapons Wild match.

On the August 23 episode of NXT, Grayson Waller introduced a new talk show called "The Waller Effect". His first guest was Apollo Crews. After the two talked about Crews's time in NXT, Crews punched Waller in the mouth. A match between Waller and Crews was scheduled for the following week, where Waller won after he poked Crews in the eye. Crews returned on the September 20 episode, where he caused Waller to lose his match. On the October 4 episode, Waller wanted security guards to protect him from Crews. The following week, Crews talked about his issues with Waller and having visions of a graveyard and a casket. Later that night, Waller lost his match after he was distracted by the Halloween Havoc wheel spinning by itself. While that match was underway, a Spin the Wheel, Make the Deal match between the two was made official for Halloween Havoc.

At Worlds Collide, NXT Tag Team Champions The Creed Brothers (Brutus Creed and Julius Creed) competed in a fatal four-way tag team elimination match to unify the NXT and NXT UK Tag Team Championship, and were the final team eliminated by Pretty Deadly (Elton Prince and Kit Wilson) after Diamond Mine teammate Damon Kemp attacked Julius, turning heel. On the September 13 episode of NXT, The Creed Brothers failed to reclaim the title from Pretty Deadly in a Steel Cage match after Kemp handcuffed Julius to the cage, leaving Brutus to fight Pretty Deadly alone. On the October 4 episode, Kemp announced that he and Julius would have a match at Halloween Havoc, with the stipulation that if Julius lost, Brutus would have to leave NXT. In turn, Julius chose his own stipulation in the form of an ambulance match.

== Event ==
Other on-screen personnel
Role:	Name:
Hosts	Shotzi
Hosts	Quincy Elliott
Commentators	Vic Joseph
Commentators	Booker T
Spanish commentators	Marcelo Rodríguez
Spanish commentators	Jerry Soto
Ring announcer	Alicia Taylor
Referees	Adrian Butler
Referees	Chip Danning
Referees	Dallas Irvin
Referees	Derek Sanders
Referees	Joey Gonzalez
Pre-show panel	Sam Roberts
Pre-show panel	McKenzie Mitchell
Pre-show panel	Dave LaGreca

=== Dark matches ===
Before the event went live on the streaming services, two dark matches took place. In the first, Kiana James defeated Valentina Feroz, while in the second, Axiom defeated Javier Bernal.

=== Pre-show ===
No matches took place on the pre-show, however, Halloween Havoc hosts Shotzi and Quincy Elliott appeared alongside Apollo Crews and Grayson Waller. They spun the wheel, which landed on "Casket match", thus being the stipulation for Waller and Crews's match.

=== Preliminary matches ===
The actual PLE began with the ladder match for the vacant NXT North American Championship, featuring Carmelo Hayes, Nathan Frazer, Wes Lee, Oro Mensah, and Von Wagner as the five participants. Frazer performed a springboard Spanish Fly suplex on Hayes onto a ladder. Trick Williams interfered by taking Mensah off of a ladder and out of the ring. Williams and Mr. Stone tried to retrieve the title belt, but Stone knocked Williams off with a shoe. Williams then tipped the ladder over, causing Stone to fall out of the ring. Frazer performed a frog splash on Wagner through a ladder. Afterwards, Lee performed a Plancha on Frazer, followed by dropkick by Mensah on Lee. Hayes performed a crossbody from the barricade on Mensah before Lee performed a cannonball on Hayes. Wagner threw Lee over the top rope and onto the announce table. After Frazer and Wagner vied for the title belt, Mensah took both of them out at ringside. Frazer and Mensah threw Wagner over the barricade and slammed a ladder onto him. After Mensah and Frazer fought at the top of the ladder, Mensah shoved Frazer off. Hayes then positioned another ladder between the ropes and one of the other ladder's rungs before pulling Mensah off the ladder. In the closing moments, Lee performed a meteora on Hayes onto the ladder bridge and unhooked the belt to win the title for the first time.

Following this, Toxic Attraction (Gigi Dolin, Jacy Jayne, and NXT Women's Champion Mandy Rose) pulled up to a haunted house. As they explored the house, Alba Fyre dragged Jayne behind a curtain before slamming Dolin onto a table. Afterwards, Fyre attacked Rose with a bat. After Rose was distracted by creepy characters, Fyre got the better of Rose before placing her in an SUV. Fyre then drove the SUV back to the Performance Center.

In the second match, Apollo Crews took on Grayson Waller in a casket match. During the match, Waller poked Crews in the eye and sent him through the casket, but since the lid wasn't closed, the match continued. Afterwards, the lights flickered, and Crews led some druids to ringside with a new casket. Waller sent Crews into the casket, but Crews used his feet to prevent the lid from closing. Waller then performed an Ace Crusher on Crews and looked for the Tombstone Piledriver, but Crews countered into a modified gutbuster. In the climax, Waller prevented the lid from closing. Waller then attempted an Ace Crusher, but Crews countered and slammed Waller into the casket before closing the lid to win the match.

Afterwards, a Chase University segment took place with Andre Chase grading his students about the history of Halloween Havoc. One of the students, Bodhi Hayward, got a question wrong, with Duke Hudson getting that question right. After the class ended, Hayward stated that he didn't trust Hudson.

Following this, footage was shown of Alba Fyre driving NXT Women's Champion Mandy Rose to the Performance Center.

In the third match, Cora Jade took on Roxanne Perez in a Weapons Wild match. Perez had a clown makeup as she made her entrance. In the opening moments, Perez blocked Jade's weapon shots with a skateboard. After Perez set up a table, Jade sprayed her in the face and swung her into the barricade. After Jade dominated the next few minutes, Perez came back with bullrope shots to Jade and a trash can lid shot. Jade blocked a Pop Rocks attempt before performing a High Knee in the corner. Perez then performed a frankensteiner off the ropes on Jade for a nearfall. The two then made their way to the elevated platform, where Perez performed a legsweep on Jade, causing both to fall through tables. In the closing moments, Perez backdropped Jade onto the chairs and followed up with Pop Rocks on Jade onto the chairs to win the match.

Afterwards, footage was shown of a man burning a mask in a fire (believed to be teasing the potential return of T-Bar to NXT under a new ring name).

Following this, Halloween Havoc host Shotzi, who was dressed as a beetlejuice, rode a giant tank to the ring and talked about how great the event has been so far, and Quincy Elliott, who was dressed as a banana, entered the fray. However, they were interrupted by Lash Legend, and after the three traded insults, Shotzi attacked Legend with a DDT. It was later announced that Legend would take on Shotzi on the following episode of NXT.

Next, The Schism (Joe Gacy, Jagger Reid, and Rip Fowler) cut a promo about masks and the other person following them. They promised to unmask that person on the following episode of NXT.

In the fourth match, Julius Creed took on Damon Kemp in an Ambulance match under the stipulation that if Julius loses, Brutus Creed must leave NXT. Kemp made his entrance while holding a chair that had the name Julius written on it. Julius picked pumpkins to chuck at him and performed a dropkick on Kemp with the match officially starting moments later. After Julius dominated, Kemp prevented the ambulance door from closing with a crutch. After Kemp used a fire extinguisher on Julius, Julius sprayed him with it. Kemp performed a drop toehold on Julius onto the concrete, but Julius kicked the ambulance door to prevent it from closing. Kemp slammed Julius onto the steel ring steps. However, Julius placed Kemp on a wheelchair and placed a crutch to trap Kemp in it. Kemp was able to get the crutch off and rammed the fire extinguisher into Julius while Julius attempted a suicide dive on him. Kemp tossed Julius into a crate and rammed it into the ambulance. However, Julius used his fingers to prevent the door from closing. Julius performed an elbow drop on Kemp through a table, after which, Julius repeatedly hit Kemp with a chair. In the end, Julius powerbombed Kemp onto the stretcher before placing him in the ambulance and closing the doors to win the match. Afterwards, Diamond Mine members Ivy Nile and Brutus Creed celebrated the moment with Julius.

While the ambulance was leaving the Performance Center, Alba Fyre and NXT Women's Champion Mandy Rose continued their brawl, and their match officially began when they were in the ring. Rose performed a spinebuster on Fyre and looked for a double underhook facebuster, but Fyre blocked and followed up with a powerbomb for a nearfall. In the climax, Fyre performed a Swanton Bomb, but Gigi Dolin and Jacy Jayne pulled the referee away. Fyre performed a superkick on Jayne, who incapacitated the referee. Fyre then performed a Gory Bomb on Rose, but no referee was there to make the count. Afterwards, Jayne cheap shotted Fyre and moments later, Rose performed Kissed by the Rose on Fyre to retain the title.

=== Main event ===
In the main event, Bron Breakker defended the NXT Championship against JD McDonagh and Ilja Dragunov in a triple threat match. Breakker used a shovel to break two tombstones with Dragunov and McDonagh's names on them. After a brutal match between the three, Breakker performed a Military Press Powerslam on Dragunov, but McDonagh pulled Breakker out of the ring and pinned Dragunov himself for a nearfall. Dragunov performed the Torpedo Moscow on Breakker, but McDonagh prevented the referee from counting to three. After McDonagh and Dragunov battled outside the ring, Dragunov performed a Torpedo Moscow on McDonagh, but sold head pain. In the closing moments, Dragunov and Breakker traded blows, with Dragunov getting the upper hand after an enziguri, German suplex, and a lariat. As Dragunov went for a Torpedo Moscow on Breakker, Breakker intercepted Dragunov with a Spear to retain the title.

== Aftermath ==
NXT Champion Bron Breakker made his first appearance since NXT Halloween Havoc on the November 1 episode of NXT, but was quickly interrupted by NXT Tag Team Champions Pretty Deadly (Kit Wilson and Elton Prince). NXT North American Champion Wes Lee interrupted, and he and Breakker challenged Wilson and Prince for the NXT Tag Team Championship, which was scheduled for that episode's main event. Wilson and Prince retained after Carmelo Hayes tripped up Lee, causing him to get pinned. A match between Lee and Hayes for the NXT North American Championship was later scheduled for the November 22 episode, where Lee retained. After the match, T-Bar, now under the ring name Dijak, made his return to NXT with an attack on Lee.

After the aforementioned NXT Tag Team Championship match, Bron Breakker was attacked by Von Wagner, setting up a match between the two for the NXT Championship on the November 15 episode of NXT, where Breakker retained.

After they failed to defeat Bron Breakker for the NXT Championship, JD McDonagh and Ilja Dragunov faced each other on the following episode of NXT, where McDonagh won by referee stoppage.

After defeating Grayson Waller in a casket match, Apollo Crews set his sights on the NXT Championship. After defeating JD McDonagh on the November 15 episode of NXT, Crews was confronted by NXT Champion Bron Breakker, setting up a match between the two for the title at NXT Deadline.

Also on NXT, Wes Lee spoke about his NXT North American Championship win. He was interrupted by Grayson Waller, followed by Raw's R-Truth, who still thought it was Halloween Havoc. Waller then challenged Truth to a match before being attacked by Truth and Lee. The following week, Waller defeated Truth by referee stoppage after Truth suffered a legitimate knee injury.

For the next Chase University segment, Bodhi Hayward did not make it to class. This was done to write him off television, as he was released on November 1. At NXT that same day, Duke Hudson was named as the new addition to the stable, and Thea Hail was the new flag bearer.

The Creed Brothers (Brutus Creed and Julius Creed) were ready for another fight with Damon Kemp, but Kemp stated that he wasn't medically cleared. A five-minute challenge between Brutus and Kemp was later scheduled for the November 8 episode of NXT, where Kemp won by disqualification after Brutus hit him with a steel chair, ending the match with 2:13 remaining.

On the November 1 episode of NXT, Toxic Attraction (Gigi Dolin and Jacy Jayne) celebrated one year of Mandy Rose's NXT Women's Championship reign, only to be interrupted by Alba Fyre, who attacked the three and sent Dolin through a table. Fyre stated that she would take out Jayne the following week, and win the NXT Women's Championship from Rose in two weeks. After Fyre took out Jayne while the latter was on a FaceTime call with Rose on the November 8 episode, a Last Woman Standing match between Fyre and Rose for the title was scheduled for the following week, where Rose retained after interference from Isla Dawn, who made her NXT debut. A match between Fyre and Dawn would later be scheduled for Deadline.

The Schism (Joe Gacy, Jagger Reid, and Rip Fowler) unmasked their newest member, which was revealed to be The Rock's daughter, Ava Raine.

Shotzi, with Quincy Elliott, took on Lash Legend on the following episode of NXT, where Shotzi was victorious.

While the 2022 NXT Halloween Havoc was held as a livestreaming event, the 2023 event returned the show to being held as a television special of NXT.

== Results ==
No.	Results	Stipulations	Times
1^{D}	Kiana James defeated Valentina Feroz	Singles match	4:25
2^{D}	Axiom defeated Javier Bernal	Singles match	1:06
3	Wes Lee defeated Carmelo Hayes (with Trick Williams), Oro Mensah, Von Wagner (with Mr. Stone), and Nathan Frazer by retrieving the championship belt	Ladder match for the vacant NXT North American Championship	19:17
4	Apollo Crews defeated Grayson Waller by trapping him in the casket with the lid completely closed	Spin the Wheel, Make the Deal: Casket match	12:58
5	Roxanne Perez defeated Cora Jade by pinfall	Spin the Wheel, Make the Deal: Weapons Wild match	12:25
6	Julius Creed defeated Damon Kemp by trapping him in the ambulance with the doors completely closed	Ambulance match Had Julius lost, Brutus Creed would have had to leave NXT.	14:09
7	Mandy Rose (c) defeated Alba Fyre by pinfall	Singles match for the NXT Women's Championship	7:07
8	Bron Breakker (c) defeated Ilja Dragunov and JD McDonagh by pinfall	Triple threat match for the NXT Championship	23:47
(c) / – the champion(s) heading into the match; D / – this was a dark match
