= NXT: Halloween Havoc (2023) =

WWE two-part television special

- Promotional poster
- Promotion: WWE
- Brand: NXT
- Date: Night 1: October 24, 2023; Night 2: October 31, 2023
- City: Orlando, Florida
- Venue: WWE Performance Center

NXT special episodes chronology
← Previous; Heatwave	Next → New Year's Evil

Halloween Havoc chronology
← Previous; 2022	Next → 2024

The 2023 NXT: Halloween Havoc was a two-part professional wrestling television special produced by WWE, held for wrestlers from the promotion's developmental brand, NXT. It was WWE's fourth annual NXT Halloween Havoc, and the 16th Halloween Havoc overall, and aired as special episodes of the weekly series NXT on the USA Network. The two-part event took place on October 24 and October 31, 2023, at NXT's home venue, the WWE Performance Center in Orlando, Florida for a fourth consecutive year. The second night made this the first Halloween Havoc to take place on Halloween. SmackDown wrestlers Shotzi and Scarlett served as the hosts of the event, marking Shotzi's third time hosting the show, after 2020 and 2022.

The 2023 edition returned the event to being a television special of NXT, like the shows in 2020 and 2021, as the 2022 edition was a premium live event (PLE), airing on WWE's livestreaming platforms. The 2023 edition was also the only to be held as a two-night event, as the previous events were only one night each with it returning to one night in 2024. The 2024 edition also returned to being a PLE, thus the 2023 event was the final to air on the USA Network as NXT moved to The CW in October 2024.

The card comprised a total of 16 matches. Thirteen of these matches were televised, with seven on the first night and six on the second, as well as three dark matches, with one on the first night and two on the second night. In the main event of Night 1, Lyra Valkyria defeated Becky Lynch to win her first NXT Women's Championship. In another prominent match, Chase University (Andre Chase and Duke Hudson) defeated The Family (Tony D'Angelo and Channing "Stacks" Lorenzo) to win the NXT Tag Team Championship. Night 1 was also notable for the NXT in-ring debut of Lexis King, formerly known as Brian Pillman Jr. in All Elite Wrestling. In the main event of Night 2, Ilja Dragunov defeated Carmelo Hayes to retain the NXT Championship. In other prominent matches, Raw's "Dirty" Dominik Mysterio defeated Nathan Frazer to retain the NXT North American Championship and Bron Breakker defeated Mr. Stone. The rock band New Years Day also performed their songs, "Vampyre" and "Hurts Like Hell", to open Night 1 and 2, respectively.

== Production ==
=== Background ===
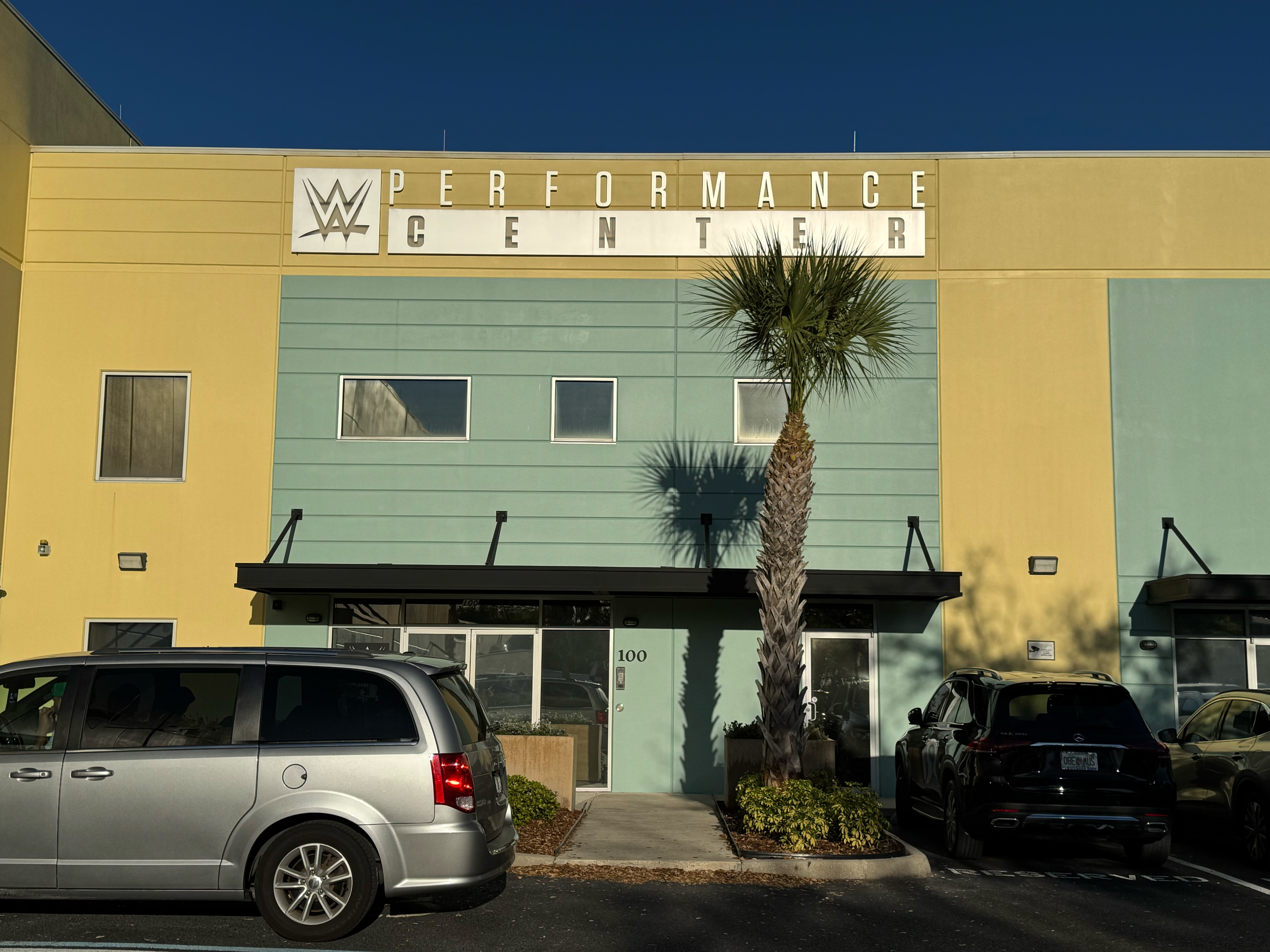
NXT's fourth annual Halloween Havoc was held at the brand's home venue, the WWE Performance Center in Orlando, Florida for a fourth consecutive year.

Halloween Havoc is a professional wrestling event established in 1989, held in October as part of the month's Halloween festivities. It was originally produced as an annual pay-per-view (PPV) event by the former World Championship Wrestling (WCW) from 1989 until 2000. Following WWE's acquisition of WCW in March 2001, WWE reinstated Halloween Havoc as an annual event for its developmental brand, NXT, in 2020. The 2020 and 2021 events were held as a television special of the weekly NXT television program, while the 2022 event was held as a premium live event (PLE).

At NXT No Mercy on September 30, 2023, it was announced that Halloween Havoc would return as a television special, but expanded to a two-part special of NXT on the USA Network. The fourth NXT Halloween Havoc, and 16th Halloween Havoc overall, was scheduled to take place on October 24 and 31, 2023, at NXT's home venue, the WWE Performance Center in Orlando, Florida for a fourth consecutive year. The second night of the event also made this the first Halloween Havoc to take place on Halloween. SmackDown wrestlers Shotzi and Scarlett served as the hosts of the event—Shotzi previously served as host of the 2020 and 2022 events, and in 2023, she and Scarlett began hosting a paranormal series on WWE's YouTube channel called Chamber of Horrors. It was also announced that the rock band New Years Day would perform their song, "Vampyre", during Night 1 of the event, which was the theme song of the two-part show, and they returned on Night 2 to perform "Hurts Like Hell".

=== Storylines ===
The card included 13 televised matches, with seven on the first night and six on the second, that resulted from scripted storylines. There were also three dark matches, with one held the first night and two the second. Results were predetermined by WWE's writers on the NXT brand, while storylines were produced on WWE's weekly television program, NXT, and the supplementary online streaming show, Level Up.

On the October 3 episode of NXT, Lyra Valkyria defeated Roxanne Perez and Indi Hartwell in a triple threat match to become the number one contender for Becky Lynch's NXT Women's Championship during Week 1 of Halloween Havoc.

On the October 10 episode of NXT, NXT Tag Team Champions The Family (Tony D'Angelo and Channing "Stacks" Lorenzo) proposed to guest NXT General Manager Cody Rhodes to set up a tag team battle royal where the last two remaining teams will compete in a standard tag team match to determine a number one contender for their titles during Week 1 of Halloween Havoc. Rhodes accepted the proposal and called this match the Bada Bing Bada Boom Battle Royal. The following week, the Battle Royal was won by Chase University (Andre Chase and Duke Hudson).

On the October 10 episode of NXT, guest NXT General Manager Cody Rhodes announced a triple threat match between Baron Corbin, Dijak, and the winner of Carmelo Hayes vs. Bron Breakker to determine the number one contender for Ilja Dragunov's NXT Championship at Halloween Havoc. Later that night, Hayes defeated Breakker to be added to the match. The following week, the triple threat match was won by Hayes.

On the September 5 episode of NXT, during Gigi Dolin's match against Thea Hail, Dolin was attacked by Blair Davenport, costing her the match. The following week, Dolin and Davenport engaged in a brawl backstage. Two weeks later, a scheduled match between Dolin and Davenport never occurred after Davenport attacked Dolin backstage. At the NXT No Mercy pre-show, after Davenport defeated Kelani Jordan, she was attacked by Dolin, and a match between them was set up for following episode of NXT, where Dolin won. After the match, Davenport choked the referee and yelled that her feud with Dolin was not over. Two weeks later, Davenport challenged Dolin to a match at Halloween Havoc, which Dolin accepted. Later that night, Dolin unveiled the Spin the Wheel, Make the Deal Wheel, and spun the wheel with it landing on a Lights Out match, which was later made official.

On the September 5 episode of NXT, Lyra Valkyria and Roxanne Perez were chatting in the locker room before being interrupted by Kiana James, where Perez hit her with a forearm to start a brawl. On the October 3 episode of NXT, during a triple threat match to become the number one contender for NXT Women's Championship, James pulled Perez to ringside, costing both James and Perez the match. The following week, James tried to attack Perez after her match with Asuka, but Shotzi appeared and attacked James. On the October 17 episode of NXT, Perez distracted James during her match with Shotzi, costing her the match. Later that night, a Spin the Wheel, Make the Deal match was announced between Perez and James, where Perez spun the wheel and it landed on Devil's Playground Match.

The NXT Women's Breakout Tournament is a tournament composed of eight female wrestlers from the NXT brand. The tournament began on the October 3 episode of NXT. The winner earns a contract and can cash-in for a NXT Women's Championship match at any time.

On the September 5 episode of NXT, Bron Breakker severely injured Von Wagner after crushing his skull with steel steps. At NXT No Mercy, Wagner's manager, Mr. Stone interfered in Breakker's match against Baron Corbin, ultimately costing him the match. On the October 17 episode of NXT, Mr. Stone stated that Wagner has a long way to go in his recovery and took issue with Breakker's lack of remorse. Mr. Stone challenged Breakker to a match at Halloween Havoc, which was later made official.

On the October 17 episode of NXT, Fallon Henley was giving advice to competitors in the NXT Women's Breakout Tournament before being interrupted by Tiffany Stratton, who mentioned she defeated Henley to advance to the finals in the previous year's tournament. The following week on Week 1 of Halloween Havoc, Henley cosplayed as Stratton and mocked her which lead to a brawl between the two. A match between Henley and Stratton was scheduled for Week 2 of Halloween Havoc.

On the October 17 episode of NXT, The Creed Brothers (Brutus Creed and Julius Creed) and Angel Garza and Humberto Carrillo competed in the Bada Bing Bada Boom Battle Royal. Garza and Carrillo eliminated the Creed Brothers before the latter cost them the match. The following week, the Creed Brothers asked for a match against Garza and Carrillo and spun the Spin the Wheel, Make the Deal wheel, landing on a Tables, Ladders, and Scares match.

In a digital exclusive on the October 16 episode of Raw, "Dirty" Dominik Mysterio interrupted an interview with Nathan Frazer, who wanted a match for the NXT North American Championship, but Mysterio declined, saying Frazer didn't deserve a title match. A brawl then ensued between Mysterio and Frazer. The next night on NXT, Mysterio and Frazer brawled again before Rhea Ripley, Mysterio's Judgment Day stablemate came to his defense. A title match between Mysterio and Frazer was later scheduled for Week 2 of Halloween Havoc.

On Week 1 of Halloween Havoc, Chase University (Andre Chase, Duke Hudson, Thea Hail, and Jacy Jayne) were celebrating Chase and Hudson winning the NXT Tag Team Championship before Chelsea Green and Piper Niven took issue with their loud voices. Green threatened to file a formal complaint and asked to be directed to Shawn Michaels's office. Hail and Jayne offered to take them there and ask for a match for the WWE Women's Tag Team Championship against Green and Niven, which was scheduled for Week 2 of Halloween Havoc.

== Results ==
Night 1 (October 24)
No.	Results	Stipulations	Times
1^{D}	Josh Briggs and Brooks Jensen defeated Tavion Heights and Riley Osborne by pinfall	Tag team match	—
2	Roxanne Perez defeated Kiana James by pinfall	Spin the Wheel, Make the Deal: Devil's Playground Match	10:51
3	Lexis King defeated Dante Chen by pinfall	Singles match	4:12
4	Kelani Jordan defeated Arianna Grace by pinfall	NXT Women's Breakout Tournament semifinal match	7:35
5	Chase University (Duke Hudson and Andre Chase) (with Thea Hail and Jacy Jayne) defeated The Family (Tony D'Angelo and Channing "Stacks" Lorenzo) (c) by pinfall	Tag team match for the NXT Tag Team Championship	11:19
6	Blair Davenport defeated Gigi Dolin by pinfall	Spin the Wheel, Make the Deal: Lights Out match	12:32
7	Lola Vice (with Elektra Lopez) defeated Karmen Petrovic by pinfall	NXT Women's Breakout Tournament semifinal match	3:36
8	Lyra Valkyria defeated Becky Lynch (c) by pinfall	Singles match for the NXT Women's Championship	16:06
(c) / – the champion(s) heading into the match; D / – this was a dark match

Night 2 (October 31)
No.	Results	Stipulations	Times
1^{D}	Ivy Nile defeated Jaida Parker by submission	Singles match	—
2^{D}	Brooks Jensen defeated Oba Femi by pinfall	Singles match	—
3	The Creed Brothers (Brutus Creed and Julius Creed) (with Ivy Nile) defeated Angel Garza and Humberto Carrillo by pinfall	Spin the Wheel, Make the Deal: Tables, Ladders, and Scares match	14:03
4	"Dirty" Dominik Mysterio (c) (with Rhea Ripley) defeated Nathan Frazer by pinfall	Singles match for the NXT North American Championship	10:26
5	Bron Breakker defeated Mr. Stone by pinfall	Singles match	2:38
6	Chelsea Green and Piper Niven (c) defeated Chase University (Thea Hail and Jacy Jayne) (with Andre Chase and Duke Hudson) by pinfall	Tag team match for the WWE Women's Tag Team Championship	8:58
7	Lola Vice (with Elektra Lopez) defeated Kelani Jordan by pinfall	NXT Women's Breakout Tournament final match	6:56
8	Ilja Dragunov (c) defeated Carmelo Hayes by pinfall	Singles match for the NXT Championship	16:42
(c) / – the champion(s) heading into the match; D / – this was a dark match

=== NXT Women's Breakout Tournament ===
The second Women's Breakout Tournament began on the October 3, 2023, episode of NXT. Lola Vice defeated Kelani Jordan in the final to win the tournament.

Tournament bracket

1st Round; NXT; October 3-17, 2023
Kelani Jordan	Pinfall
Izzi Dame	4:52
Arianna Grace	Pinfall
Brinley Reece (Note: Brinley Reece replaced Jakara Jackson after Jackson was not medically cleared to compete.)	2:56
Karmen Petrovic	Submission
Jaida Parker	3:38
Dani Palmer	3:59
Lola Vice	Pinfall

Semifinals; Halloween Havoc; October 24, 2023
Kelani Jordan	Pinfall
Arianna Grace	7:35
Karmen Petrovic	3:36
Lola Vice	Pinfall

Final; Halloween Havoc; October 31, 2023
Kelani Jordan	6:56
Lola Vice	Pinfall

== See also ==
- 2023 in professional wrestling
- List of WWE NXT special episodes
