= Van Hammer =

American professional wrestler (1959–2026)

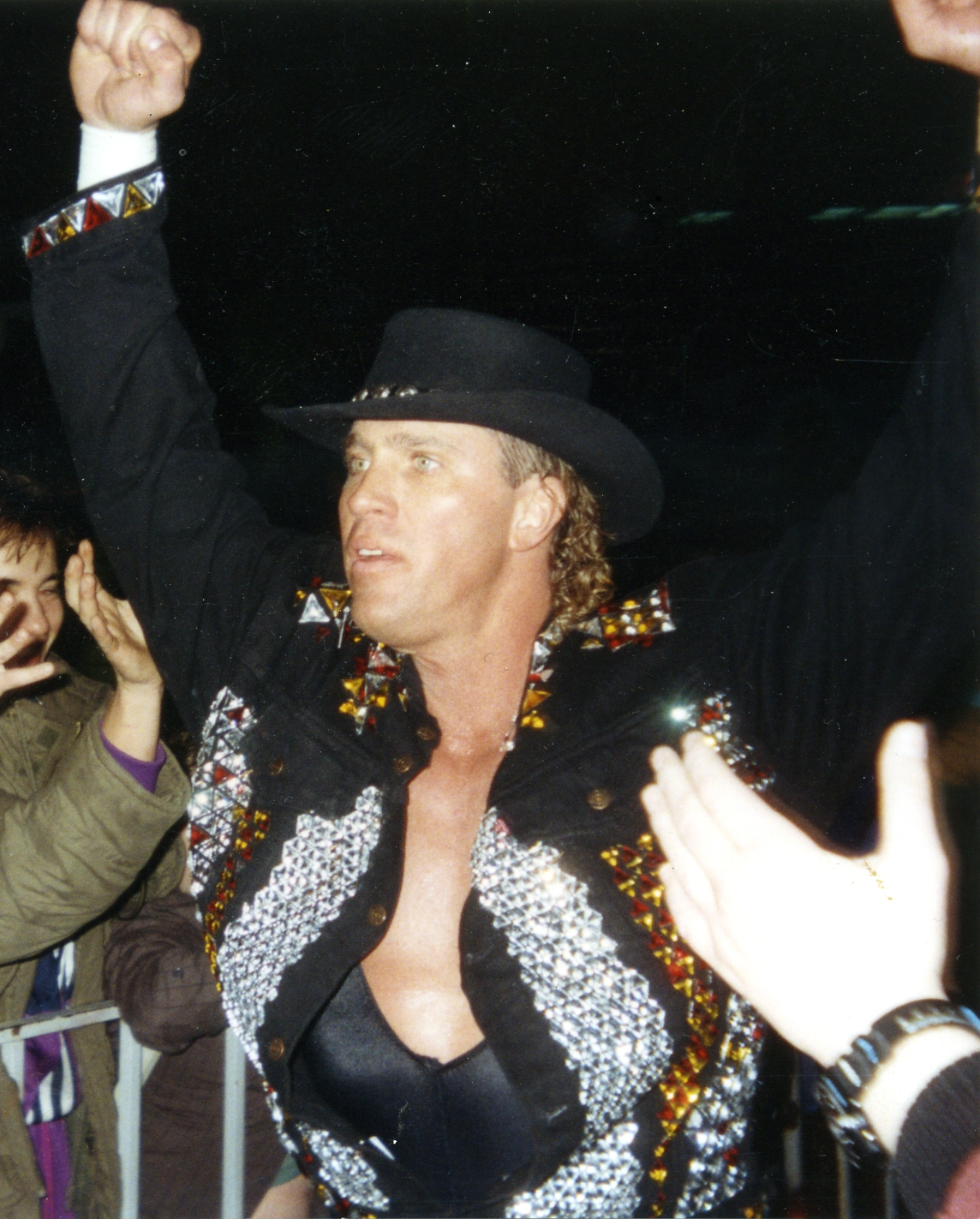
- Van Hammer in 1993

Personal information
- Born: Mark Ty Hildreth; November 1, 1959 Hebron, Maryland, U.S.
- Died: April 18, 2026 (aged 66) Boynton Beach, Florida, U.S.

Professional wrestling career
- Ring names: Van Hammer; Major Stash
- Billed height: 6 ft 6 in (198 cm)
- Billed weight: 280 lb (127 kg)
- Billed from: New York City; Baltimore, Maryland
- Trained by: Boris Malenko; Dan Spivey; WCW Power Plant
- Debut: 1991
- Retired: 2009

Mark Ty Hildreth (November 1, 1959 – April 18, 2026) was an American professional wrestler, best known for his tenures in World Championship Wrestling (WCW) under the ring name Van Hammer.

== Early life ==
Mark Ty Hildreth was born in Hebron, Maryland, on November 1, 1959. Before becoming a wrestler, Hildreth joined the United States Navy after graduating from high school and traveled around the world while on tour.

== Professional wrestling career ==
=== Early career (1991) ===
After being trained by Boris Malenko and Dan Spivey, Hildreth made his debut on July 19, 1991, as "The Hammer", teaming with "Iceman" King Parsons to defeat Billy Travis and Khris Germany in a tag team match for the North Georgia Wrestling Alliance. The referee for this match was Hildreth's brother, Dwayne Hildreth. Hildreth had expected to wrestle on the independent circuit for at least a few years. The promotion was booked by Dusty Rhodes, who also served as the booker for WCW. Despite having wrestled just one match, Hildreth was invited to be the opponent for fellow Malenko trainee Marc Mero for the latter's tryout match for WCW.

=== World Championship Wrestling (1991–1995) ===
Marc Mero was brought in to WCW for a tryout match in 1991, and Hildreth was his opponent. Then booker Dusty Rhodes liked both and signed each of them to contracts, with Hammer signed to a $156,000 deal. In September 1991, Hildreth joined WCW as "Heavy Metal" Van Hammer, a rock star gimmick. He made his debut for the promotion at Clash of the Champions XVI, where he squashed Terrance Taylor in 39 seconds. He immediately was thrust onto the house show circuit, defeating Taylor in multiple rematches as well as defeating Oz and Cactus Jack. He made his WCW television debut on the October 15 episode of Saturday Night, defeating Paul Lee. Twelve days later, he made his pay-per-view debut at Halloween Havoc, defeating Doug Somers. On November 3, he gained a non-title victory over WCW TV Champion Steve Austin at a house show in Charleston, West Virginia. Hammer would go on to amass a 42–0 record competing on both house shows and television before finally having his streak ended when he lost a match to Cactus Jack at Clash of the Champions XVII. At Starrcade, Hammer teamed with Big Josh in a losing effort to Steve Austin and Rick Rude.

After briefly continuing his tag team with Big Josh, Hammer returned to singles competition and faced Steve Austin for the WCW World Television Championship on the January 12 episode of Main Event, but was unable to win the title. After the loss, Hammer competed sporadically throughout the rest of the spring (including a brief feud with J. T. Southern) before returning full-time in August 1992. Hammer would fall to Greg Valentine and Nikita Koloff before his push began to accelerate. In September he went on a ten match winning streak, defeating Dallas Page, Vinnie Vegas (Kevin Nash), and Super Invader (Hercules Hernandez). He received a US title shot against Rick Rude on the September 12 episode of WCW Worldwide, where he sustained a knee injury. Upon his return he teamed with Erik Watts at Halloween Havoc and was victorious against The Vegas Connection. For the remainder of October and November he was strongly pushed, going 19–2 in a streak that included victories over Tony Atlas, The Barbarian, and Mustafa Saed. He would also team with Brad Armstrong in a brief feud with Page and Vegas.

On the November 21 episode of WCW Worldwide, Hammer was entered into the Jesse "The Body" Ventura Strongest Arm Tournament and defeated Vinnie Vegas. On the December 12 episode, Hammer upset Big Van Vader to advance to the finals against WCW World Heavyweight Champion Ron Simmons. The following week Hammer defeated Simmons to win the arm wrestling challenge.

Hammer teamed with Sting and was victorious in a tag-team match on the November 21 episode of WCW Saturday Night, defeating Rick Rude & Cactus Jack via disqualification. On a November 26 house show at the Omni in Atlanta, Georgia, Hammer was given a broken nose by Rick Rude during an eight-man tag-team main event match held in a thunderdome cage match. Rather than take time off he instead took a Sharpie, inserted it into his nose, and straightened it out. Despite the injury he missed no dates and continued to be victorious on the house show circuit. Hammer made his second Starrcade appearance, where he and his trainer Dan Spivey defeated Cactus Jack and Johnny B. Badd to qualify for the Battlebowl. In the main event, The Great Muta defeated both Hammer, Spivey and five other wrestlers to win the Battlebowl.

On January 2, 1993, Van Hammer lost to Tony Atlas in the quarterfinals of a tournament for the vacant WCW United States Heavyweight Championship on Saturday Night. A day later he lost to World Heavyweight Champion Big Van Vader on a house show in Bristol, TN, after which he took time off to have surgery to repair the broken nose that he had been wrestling with, causing him to miss the Thunderdome match at the Clash of the Champions XXII on January 13. He would be out for a month before returning on the February 9 taping of WCW Power Hour. Hammer continued to be a mainstay on Saturday Night, winning the majority of his matches. At the first-ever Slamboree pay-per-view, Van Hammer lost his match with Sid Vicious in only 35 seconds.

Despite the quick loss Hammer continued to be pushed, defeating Vinnie Vegas on a house show in Louisville, Kentucky, on June 3. He was victorious as well against Tommy Angel and Vladimir Koloff as well that month, although he sustained a defeat to Rick Rude. On July 3, Hammer defeated Lord Steven Regal at a house show in Spartanburg, South Carolina. His final WCW match came on July 11 in Tower City, Pennsylvania, when he pinned Wrecking Crew Fury. Due to WCW's lengthy tapings that began that month, he continued to appear much later in the year. On the September 11 episode of WCW Worldwide (taped July 7 in Orlando, Florida) he teamed with 2 Cold Scorpio and Marcus Alexander Bagwell in a losing effort against Sid Vicious & Harlem Heat. His final television appearance came on the November 6 episode of WCW Worldwide (taped July 10 in Orlando, Florida), Hammer attempted to defend his Jesse Ventura's Strongest Arm championship but was defeated by The Equalizer in the first round.

In addition to making a television appearance in November 1993 (due to the pre-taping in July) in the Jesse Ventura arm-wrestling challenge, Hammer's name was also mentioned on the January 4 episode of WCW Main Event in a segment with Diamond Dallas Page. The heel randomly drew names out a fishbowl, and Hammer's name was one of the selections. He returned November 29, 1994, and was defeated by Dick Slater at a television taping.

On the January 21, 1995, episode of WCW Pro (taped on December 4, 1994, in Dalton, Georgia) another challenge was made by Diamond Dallas Page, this time a call to defend his arm wrestling title. Van Hammer made a surprise appearance to accept the challenge and Page faked an arm injury and called it off. One month later, on the February 25 episode of WCW Pro, Page defeated Hammer in an arm wrestling match after Max Muscle interfered. Hammer took a hiatus from wrestling.

=== World Wrestling Federation (1993) ===
On July 26, 1993, Hildreth received a tryout match at a WWF Superstars taping in Utica, New York. Wrestling as Van Hammer, he worked as a heel and was defeated by Virgil. The following day working as a babyface at a Wrestling Challenge taping in Plattsburgh, New York he was defeated by Damien Demento in another dark match.

=== Return to World Championship Wrestling (1997–2000) ===
==== The Flock (1997–1998) ====
In November 1997, Hildreth returned to WCW, where he was placed in Raven's stable The Flock. Despite being an undercarder, much like the rest of The Flock's members, he was granted a title match against the United States Heavyweight Champion Diamond Dallas Page on the February 23, 1998, episode of Monday Nitro, but was unsuccessful in winning the title. On the March 2, 1998, episode of Nitro, Hammer lost to Page via disqualification in a title rematch.

==== Singles competition (1998–1999) ====
Hammer began jobbing to several top stars before winning a Loser Leaves The Flock match against fellow Flock member Perry Saturn on a special Friday episode of Nitro on May 4. Despite the win, The Flock attacked Hammer after the match and he was thrown out of the group. In his first match following his expulsion from The Flock, Hammer faced the new United States Heavyweight Champion Goldberg for the title the following night on Saturday Night, but lost. He then abandoned the grunge-related attire he had while with The Flock and became a face by adopting a hippie gimmick. After spending the rest of 1998 and January 1999 jobbing, he became a heel again and changed his gimmick to that of an anti-pacifist and returned to using his full Van Hammer name. Following this, he began a short winning streak over the next few weeks before losing to Bam Bam Bigelow on the February 22, 1999, episode of Nitro. Van Hammer quickly rebounded and began another winning streak over the following weeks on Nitro, Thunder, Saturday Night and even on pay-per-view at The Great American Bash on June 13 by defeating Mikey Whipwreck. Hammer's winning streak was ended a few weeks later as he lost to Rick Steiner in a title match for Steiner's World Television Championship on July 11 at Bash at the Beach. On the October 11 episode of Nitro, Hammer lost to Sid Vicious in a match for the United States Heavyweight Championship.

==== Misfits In Action (2000) ====
On the May 2, 2000, episode of Thunder, Hammer participated in a 41-man battle royal to determine the number one contender for the World Heavyweight Championship, which was ultimately won by Ric Flair. Soon afterward, Hammer joined the Misfits In Action and was renamed Major Stash so as to fit in with the stable's military gimmick. He was originally to be named Private Stash, as an inside joke to marijuana, but balked at being given the lowest rank in the stable, leading him to being "promoted" to "Major". Stash's tenure with the Misfits was short-lived, as he wrestled what turned out to be his final match in WCW, a loss to The Demon on the July 12, 2000, episode of Thunder, as he was released from his contract shortly after.

=== Late career (2001–2003, 2009) ===
After leaving WCW, Hildreth took a brief hiatus from wrestling. On March 16, 2001, under his Van Hammer ring name and rock star gimmick, he lost to Thrasher in a match for Maryland Championship Wrestling. He returned to MCW on June 9, and defeated Dino Devine. On December 16, he teamed with Cowboy to defeat Devine and Chad Bowman. In October 2001, Hammer went to Japan to wrestle a tour for Big Japan Pro Wrestling. On February 16, 2002, Hammer teamed with Cowboy in a rematch against Devine and Bowman, which he and Cowboy lost. After a year long hiatus, Van Hammer returned to MCW on July 16, 2003, at MCW's annual Shane Shamrock Memorial Cup, where he won an eight-man tag team match alongside Gillberg, Thrasher and Kelly Bell against Brock Singleton, Genesis and The Holy Rollers (Earl the Pearl and Rich Meyes).

In 2009, Hildreth attended an MCW show where wrestler Champ Champagne performed a promo calling Hildreth "washed up" and comparing him to Randy "The Ram" Robinson, the character played by Mickey Rourke in the film The Wrestler. In response, Hildreth entered the ring, but Champ Champagne fled before a fight could break out. On April 11, 2009, at MCW's event Xtreme Measures, Hildreth – wrestling as "Van Hammer" – came out of retirement for one night to defeat Champ Champagne.

== Other media ==
As Van Hammer, Hildreth appeared in the 2000 film Ready to Rumble, and was a playable character in the video games WCW/nWo Thunder and WCW/nWo Revenge.

== Legal issues ==
On January 26, 2020, Hildreth was arrested in Palm Beach County, Florida, and charged with DUI and first degree felony hit and run. Hildreth was reported to be driving at 58 mph in a 35 mph zone when he hit a 5-year-old child who was riding a bicycle. The child reportedly flew on to the hood of Hildreth's car and suffered internal injuries, but ultimately survived. In May 2020, Hildreth pleaded guilty to both charges, and as a result was sentenced to one year of probation, one year of driver's license revocation, and he was required to have an interlock device placed in his vehicle at all times.

== Death ==
Hildreth died on April 18, 2026, at the age of 66.

The autopsy reported a 2.5 inch laceration on the back of his head, two fractured anterior ribs, and evidence of long-term substance dependency in the liver. The cause of death was recorded as complications of chronic ethanolism.

== Championships and accomplishments ==
- Pro Wrestling Illustrated
  - PWI ranked him #112 of the 500 best singles wrestlers of the PWI 500 in 1993
  - PWI ranked him #402 of the top 500 singles wrestlers of the PWI Years in 2003
- World Championship Wrestling
  - Jesse Ventura Strongest Arms Arm Wrestling Tournament (1992)
- Wrestling Observer Newsletter
  - Most Embarrassing Wrestler (1991)
