= Halloween Havoc =

World Championship Wrestling/WWE special event series

- WWE Halloween Havoc logo used in 2024
- Promotions: World Championship Wrestling (1989–2000); WWE (2020–present)
- Brands: WCW/nWo (1998); NXT (2020–present)
- First event: 1989
- Signature matches: Spin the Wheel, Make the Deal (1992–1993, 2020–present)

Halloween Havoc is a professional wrestling event currently produced by WWE. Since 2020, it has been held annually for the company's developmental brand, NXT. As the name implies, it is a Halloween-themed show held in October.

It was originally produced as an annual pay-per-view (PPV) event by World Championship Wrestling (WCW) from 1989 until 2000. The first two events were held when WCW was still affiliated with the National Wrestling Alliance (NWA) before WCW split from the NWA in January 1991. The final five events under WCW (1996–2000) were held at the MGM Grand Garden Arena in the Las Vegas suburb of Paradise, Nevada.

WWE—at that time still known as the World Wrestling Federation (WWF)—purchased the assets of WCW in March 2001. Nineteen years later, Halloween Havoc was revived as an annual event for WWE's NXT brand in 2020. The 2020, 2021, and 2023 editions were held as special episodes of NXT's weekly television program, with the latter broadcast as a two-week event. The 2022 edition aired via WWE's livestreaming platforms, with the 2024 event to also air via this medium, subsequently returning to a singular night.

== History ==
In 1989, World Championship Wrestling (WCW) of the National Wrestling Alliance (NWA) scheduled a Halloween-themed pay-per-view (PPV) event for October 28, 1989, at the Philadelphia Civic Center in Philadelphia, Pennsylvania. The event was aptly named Halloween Havoc. A second Halloween Havoc was scheduled for the following year, thus establishing Halloween Havoc as an annual PPV for WCW. This second event was also the final Halloween Havoc produced by WCW under the NWA banner as WCW split from the NWA in January 1991.

The 2000 event was the final Halloween Havoc produced by WCW, as in March 2001, WCW was acquired by the World Wrestling Federation (WWF); the WWF was renamed to World Wrestling Entertainment (WWE) in 2002 ("WWE" became an orphaned initialism in 2011). After 19 years since the acquisition of WCW, WWE revived Halloween Havoc for their developmental brand, NXT. Both the 2020 and 2021 events were held as television special episodes of the NXT television program, which aired on the USA Network. The 2022 event, however, was held as a livestreaming event, airing on Peacock in the United States and the WWE Network in international markets. The event returned to being a television special in 2023, but was expanded to a two-part special of NXT on the USA Network. It then returned to livestreaming in 2024 and to one night.

The 1994 and 1995 events were both held at the Joe Louis Arena in Detroit, Michigan before becoming a main stay at the MGM Grand Garden Arena in Las Vegas, Nevada from 1996 to 2000. From the event's revival in 2020 to 2023, it was held at NXT's home venue, the WWE Performance Center in Orlando, Florida. The 2024 event marks the first time that NXT Halloween Havoc would take place outside of the WWE Performance Center.

In 2014, all WCW PPVs, including Halloween Havoc, were made available on WWE's streaming service, the WWE Network. Since March 2021, they are also available on Peacock in the United States as the American version of the WWE Network merged under Peacock at that time. From 2020 to 2023, Halloween Havoc carried the NXT logo until it was replaced by the WWE logo from 2024.

== Events ==
WCW/nWo co-branded event	NXT-branded event

#	Event	Date	City	Venue	Main event(s)	Ref
National Wrestling Alliance: World Championship Wrestling
1	Halloween Havoc (1989)	October 28, 1989	Philadelphia, Pennsylvania	Philadelphia Civic Center	Ric Flair and Sting vs. The Great Muta and Terry Funk in a Thunderdome match with Bruno Sammartino as special guest referee	
2	Halloween Havoc (1990)	October 27, 1990	Chicago, Illinois	UIC Pavilion	Sting (c) vs. Sid Vicious for the NWA World Heavyweight Championship	
World Championship Wrestling
3	Halloween Havoc (1991)	October 27, 1991	Chattanooga, Tennessee	UTC Arena	Lex Luger (c) vs. Ron Simmons in a two-out-of-three falls match for the WCW World Heavyweight Championship	
4	Halloween Havoc (1992)	October 25, 1992	Philadelphia, Pennsylvania	Philadelphia Civic Center	Sting vs. Jake Roberts in a Coal Miner's Glove match	
5	Halloween Havoc (1993)	October 24, 1993	New Orleans, Louisiana	Lakefront Arena	Big Van Vader vs. Cactus Jack in a Texas Death match	
6	Halloween Havoc (1994)	October 23, 1994	Detroit, Michigan	Joe Louis Arena	Hulk Hogan (c) vs. Ric Flair in a Steel Cage match for the WCW World Heavyweight Championship with Mr. T as special guest referee	
7	Halloween Havoc (1995)	October 29, 1995	Detroit, Michigan	Joe Louis Arena	Hulk Hogan (c) vs. The Giant for the WCW World Heavyweight Championship	
8	Halloween Havoc (1996)	October 27, 1996	Paradise, Nevada	MGM Grand Garden Arena	Hollywood Hogan (c) vs. Randy Savage for the WCW World Heavyweight Championship	
9	Halloween Havoc (1997)	October 26, 1997	Paradise, Nevada	MGM Grand Garden Arena	Roddy Piper vs. Hollywood Hogan in a Steel Cage match	
10	Halloween Havoc (1998)	October 25, 1998	Paradise, Nevada	MGM Grand Garden Arena	Goldberg (c) vs. Diamond Dallas Page for the WCW World Heavyweight Championship	
11	Halloween Havoc (1999)	October 24, 1999	Paradise, Nevada	MGM Grand Garden Arena	Sting (c) vs. Goldberg for the WCW World Heavyweight Championship	
12	Halloween Havoc (2000)	October 29, 2000	Paradise, Nevada	MGM Grand Garden Arena	Goldberg vs. KroniK (Brian Adams and Bryan Clark) in a Handicap elimination match	
WWE: NXT
13	NXT Halloween Havoc (2020)	October 28, 2020	Orlando, Florida	WWE Performance Center (Note: The main arena of the WWE Performance Center was known as the Capitol Wrestling Center from October 2020 to September 2021.)	Io Shirai (c) vs. Candice LeRae in a Tables, Ladders, and Scares match for the NXT Women's Championship	
14	NXT Halloween Havoc (2021)	October 26, 2021	Orlando, Florida	WWE Performance Center	Tommaso Ciampa (c) vs. Bron Breakker for the NXT Championship	
15	NXT Halloween Havoc (2022)	October 22, 2022	Orlando, Florida	WWE Performance Center	Bron Breakker (c) vs. Ilja Dragunov vs. JD McDonagh for the NXT Championship	
16	NXT Halloween Havoc (2023)	October 24, 2023	Orlando, Florida	WWE Performance Center	Becky Lynch (c) vs. Lyra Valkyria for the NXT Women's Championship	
16	NXT Halloween Havoc (2023)	October 31, 2023	Orlando, Florida	WWE Performance Center	Ilja Dragunov (c) vs. Carmelo Hayes for the NXT Championship	
17	NXT Halloween Havoc (2024)	October 27, 2024	Hershey, Pennsylvania	Giant Center	Trick Williams (c) vs. Ethan Page in a Devil's Playground match for the NXT Championship	
18	NXT Halloween Havoc (2025)	October 25, 2025	Prescott Valley, Arizona	Findlay Toyota Center	Ricky Saints (c) vs. Trick Williams for the NXT Championship	
19	NXT Halloween Havoc (2026)	October 31, 2026	Orlando, Florida	WWE Performance Center	Grayson Waller (c) vs. Tony D'Angelo for the NXT Championship	
(c) – refers to the champion(s) heading into the match
