= Doug Somers =

American professional wrestler

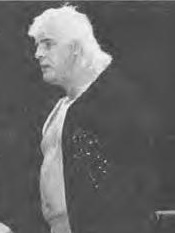

Personal information
- Born: Douglas Duane Somerson; September 22, 1951 Minneapolis, Minnesota, U.S.
- Died: May 16, 2017 (aged 65) Buchanan, Georgia, U.S.

Professional wrestling career
- Ring name: Doug Somers
- Billed height: 6 ft 3 in (1.91 m)
- Billed weight: 245 lb (111 kg)
- Trained by: Harley Race
- Debut: October 1, 1973
- Retired: July 20, 2013

Douglas Duane Somerson (September 22, 1951 – May 16, 2017) was an American professional wrestler known by his ring name "Pretty Boy" Doug Somers. He worked in the American Wrestling Association (AWA) in the mid-1980s as part of a tag team with "Playboy" Buddy Rose, managed by Sherri Martel, and twice held the AWA World Tag Team Championship.

== Early life ==
Douglas Duane Somerson, born September 22, 1951, in the heart of South Minneapolis, Minnesota, was the youngest of seven children of Carl and Dorothy Somerson. He had four brothers Jack, Russ, Dennis, and Gene and two sisters Barbara and Shirley.

== Professional wrestling career ==
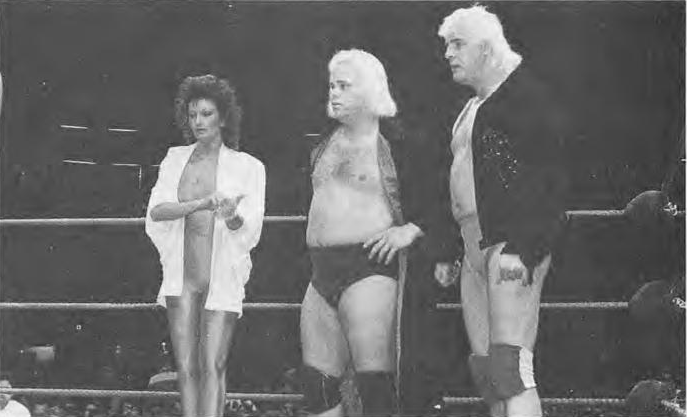
Somers (right) with manager Sherri Martel (left) and tag team partner Buddy Rose (center), circa 1986

=== 1973-1979 ===
Doug Somers made his debut on October 1, 1973, for the Mid-Atlantic Championship Wrestling, defeating Bill Bowman in Charlotte, North Carolina. As a rookie, Somers faced Mike Hall, Gene Lewis, Mike York, and Bruce Swayze. In 1974, he moved to Big Time Wrestling, an affiliate of the National Wrestling Alliance. He debuted for the promotion on March 11, 1974, in a loss to Bob Roop. During his tour of the territory he faced The Great Mephisto, The Texan, Benny Matta, and Joe Blanchard. His final match came on May 18 when he faced Ken Patera. Somers then moved to NWA affiliate Georgia Championship Wrestling, making his first appearance three days after his final Big Time Wrestling match on a card in Macon, Georgia. There he participated in twenty man battle royal that was won by Andre the Giant. A day later he teamed with Big Mac in a losing handicap effort against Andre. The young wrestler was winless during his run, being defeated by various performers including Ricky Gibson, Dudley Clements, Bill Dromo, and Jimmy Golden. He closed his GCW run with a loss to Larry Zbyszko on March 21, 1975. During his time with Georgia Championship Wrestling, Somers made initial appearances in Verne Gagne's American Wrestling Association (AWA). He made his debut for the large promotion on October 16, 1974, in a televised loss to Chris Taylor. Somers would also wrestle Jim Brunzell and Boris Breznikoff.

Somers then moved to another NWA affiliate in the Championship Wrestling from Florida (CWF). Winless since his initial run with Mid-Atlantic Championship wrestling, Somers defeated Ricky Fields in his debut with the promotion on March 24, 1975. He would enjoy moderate success, defeating Fields in a rematch as well as pinning Frank Hester and Rick Martel. On July 15, 1975, he participated in the Fort Myers Title Tournament at a house show in Fort Myers, Florida but was defeated by Mr Eito. His finished his first CWF on October 7, 1975, when he was beaten by "Coach" John Heath in Fort Myers. He then returned to MACW for the first time since his initial rookie run, making his debut on October 18, 1975, as he teamed with Joe Soto to face Ron Starr and Tony Rocco. During his second run he faced Ron Starr, The Avenger, Ken Patera, Tony Atlas, Ronnie Garvin, and Klondike Bill. As 1976 progressed Somers began to move up the card, defeating Manuel Soto, Larry Zbyszko, and Mr Hayashi in house show encounters. He also went to time limit draws with Mr Fujinami and Angelo Poffo and established himself in the midcard. His tour of MACW came to a conclusion on February 6, 1977, when he faced Frankie Lancaster. During his run with MACW, Somers traveled to Japan for the first time for a tour with All Japan Pro Wrestling. His first match came on November 14, 1975, when he battled Thunder Sugiyama to a double countout in Korakuen Hall. Somers was winless in his first tour, losing to multiple performers including The Destroyer, Jumbo Tsuruta, and AJPW headliner Giant Baba. Somers then moved to yet another National Wrestling Alliance territory and joined the NWA Western States promotion. He made his debut of March 16, 1977 in Lubbock, Texas when he teamed with Alex Perez and Rip Hawk to defeat El Bracero, Jerry Kozak and The Super Destroyer. Somers would battle Sika Anoai, The Super Destroyer, and Ted Dibiase to time limit draws.

He then moved on to NWA affiliate NWA Tri-State, making his debut on July 6, 1977, at a house show in Baton Rouge and battling Terry Sawyer to a time limit draw. Somers continued his ascent, defeating Johnny Boyd, Frank Dalton, Tom Shaft, Brian Blair, and Lynn Denton. During this time he formed a team with Ron McFarland, winning his first ever title in the NWA Tri-State Tag-Team Championship. He and McFarlane would go on to hold the belts twice.

His time in the Tri-State territory concluded on January 17, 1978, with a loss to Ray Candy in Alexandria, Louisiana. After spending some time in Central States Wrestling and NWA St Louis during the spring, Somers returned to NWA Western States on July 5, 1978, in a match against Noah Jones in Abilene, Texas. He remained in the mid-card, going to time limit draws with Ted Dibiase, Scott Casey, and Ricky Romero. On September 28, 1978, Somers captured his second title when he teamed with Roger Kirby to defeat Dory Funk Jr. and Larry Lane to win the NWA Western States Tag Team Championship in Amarillo. Somers and Kirby would hold the titles for one month before losing them to Blackjack Mulligan and Dick Murdoch on October 31, 1978, in Odessa. On November 30, the duo unsuccessfully challenged The Von Erichs (David & Kevin Von Erich) for the NWA Americas Tag Team Championship.

Somers then jumped to the AWA, making his return on December 30, 1978, at a house show in Milwaukee to face Frank Hill. This run saw Somers in competition against Nick Bockwinkle, Art Thomas, Doug Gilbert, and Paul Ellering. Somers returned to GCW on May 29, 1979, at a house show in Macon, Georgia, teaming with Kurt Von Hess in a match against Ray Candy and Mr. Wrestling I. As with in recent AWA run, Somers went on a lengthy winless streak and fell in singles matches against Ray Candy, Jerry Stubbs, and Tommy Rich. He then returned to MACW, marking his third run with the NWA territory. Somers made his debut at a house show on September 17, 1979, in Greenville, South Carolina, battling Nick DeCarlo to a time limit draw. On October 12, 1979, he secured a major upset, pinning former WWF World Heavyweight Champion Pedro Morales in Charleston.

=== 1980-1986 ===
On the January 16, 1980 episode of MACW television, Somers faced United States Heavyweight Champion Ric Flair but was pinned. Doug Somers jumped to NWA affiliate Houston Wrestling, making his debut on April 24, 1981, in Houston in a match against Chavo Guerrero Sr. Somers made a return to Central States Wrestling on August 16, 1981. Teaming with Michael Hayes, the duo unsuccessfully challenged Bob Sweetan and Terry Gibbs for the NWA Central States Tag Team Championship. This run saw him face Angelo Mosca Jr., Bobby Fulton, and Tom Jones. During this period Somers also ventured out into NWA Western States and NWA Tri-States. He then jumped to Don Owens's Pacific Northwest Wrestling, yet another NWA affiliate. Somers made his debut on January 14, 1984, in Portland, Oregon, battling Jerry O to a time limit draw. On February 11, 1984, he faced future partner Buddy Rose for the first time, losing the encounter on February 4 in Portland. On April 30 he unsuccessfully challenged Buddy Rose for the NWA Pacific Northwest Heavyweight Championship but was defeated. As the year progressed he battled Mando Guerrero, Kevin Kelly, Siva Afi, and Matt Borne. His final match with the promotion came on September 29, 1984, in a bout against Bobby Jaggers in Eugene. After brief stops in Pro Wrestling USA and NWA Polynesian, Somers returned to the reconstituted Championship Wrestling from Georgia on January 29, 1985, in a match against The Italian Stallion. Somers formed a brief team with Chick Donovan and engaged in a house show series with Rock 'n' Roll RPMs (Mike Davis and Tommy Lane) that spring, followed by singles matches against Ole Anderson and a victorious series against Paul Diamond.

=== AWA (1986-1987) ===
Doug Somers made his return to the American Wrestling Association on January 24, 1986, teaming with Spike Jones in an unsuccessful challenge of AWA World Tag Team Champions Scott Hall and Curt Hennig. Somers would face both members of The Midnight Rockers in singles matches that spring, as well as a young Leon White. On March 13, 1986, he teamed with up with "Playboy" Buddy Rose for the first time, losing to the Midnight Rockers on AWA television. This became a consistent partnership and the team was managed by Sherri Martel. The duo captured the AWA World Tag Team Championship by defeating Curt Hennig and Scott Hall via countout on May 17, 1986. They went on to feud with The Midnight Rockers over the belts for the remainder of 1986, culminating with Michaels and Jannetty winning the title on January 17, 1987. Somers would continue to wrestle for the AWA as both a singles wrestler and tag team wrestler (with both Buddy Wolfe and Kevin Kelly) throughout 1987.

=== 1987-1989 ===
Somers appeared in the Continental Wrestling Association (CWA), teaming with Soldat Ustinov as a last minute replacement Boris Zukhov (who jumped to the World Wrestling Federation) as Soldat Ustinov's tag team partner in a title defense against The Nasty Boys in Memphis on October 5, 1987. One week later they were defeated for the AWA Tag Team Championship by Jerry Lawler and Bill Dundee. The Pretty Boy then ventured into Southern Championship Wrestling (SCW), making his debut on February 21, 1988, by teaming with Sunny Beach in a losing effort against Ricky Morton and Tommy Rich. After wrestling for several months, his final match came on August 21, 1988, in a defeat to The Bullet.

Somers next appeared in Windy City Wrestling, where he teamed with Buddy Rose in a losing effort to The Windy City Dream Team (Eddie Strong and Lance Allen) on August 12, 1988, in Chicago. His final match came on February 11, 1989, as he teamed with Rose once more to face Hurricane Smith and John Nord. He then traveled to a Japan for a tour with All Japan Pro Wrestling. His first match came on February 23, 1989, as he teamed with Ted Oates in a losing effort to Giant Baba and Tiger Mask in Korakuen Hall. Somers teamed frequently with Oates during the tour, facing opponents such as Akira Taue, Haruka Eigen, Motoshi Okuma, Shinichi Nakano, Kenta Kobashi, and Rusher Kimura. His final match came on March 8, 1989, in Nippon Budokan when he teamed with Oates and was defeated by Baba and Haruka Eigen. Following his All Japan tour, Somers returned to the AWA on November 28, 1989, at a television taping in Minneapolis. Now managed by Johnny Valiant, he was defeated by Tommy Jammer via disqualification. On November 18, 1989, he was beaten by Nikita Koloff. His final match came at the same TV taping where he defeated Spike Jones. Somers took a hiatus from wrestling in 1990.

=== World Championship Wrestling (1991) ===
The Pretty Boy made his debut in World Championship Wrestling at a taping of World Championship Wrestling on September 14, 1991, in Atlanta when he faced Big Josh. He made his house show debut on October 12, 1991, teaming with Sgt. Buddy Lee Parker in a losing effort to The WCW Patriots. On October 19 edition WCW Saturday Night he was faced Sting for the WCW United States Heavyweight Championship but was defeated. During the fall he would face The Young Pistols, Arachnaman, and Ron Simmons. At WCW Halloween Havoc 1991, Somers lost to Van Hammer in the first PPV match of his career. His final match came on the November 30, 1991 episode of WCW Power Hour where he faced El Gigante.

=== World Wrestling Federation (1992) ===
Somers next appeared in the World Wrestling Federation, facing Tatanka on February 17, 1992, in a WWF Superstars taping in Tampa. He would also lose to Owen Hart at the same taping. Somers would make several appearances for the World Wrestling Federation as an enhancement talent on their weekly syndicated programming, facing The Bushwhackers, J. W. Storm, Tito Santana, Jim Duggan, Sgt. Slaughter, and Koko B. Ware. His final match came on the September 6, 1992 episode of Wrestling Challenge, where he was defeated by Big Boss Man.

=== Later Career (1991-2013) ===
Somers went on to wrestle on the independent circuit and for the Global Wrestling Federation in 1991, taking part in their TV title tournament. He has also wrestled for Georgia independent company Folkstyle Championship Wrestling, in a feud with Frankie Valentine.

On November 23, 1996, he joined the Allied Independent Wrestling Federations. Teaming with Johnny Reb they defeated The Tennessee Violence Authority. On December 28, 1996, he defeated Don Carson to capture the AIWF World Heavyweight Championship. On May 1, 2011, at the Memorial Mayhem 2 show, Somers debuted for NWA Rampage. He was on guest commentary during the television title match between champion Jeremy Vain and Somers' trainee Frankie Valentine. Vain defeated Valentine after Somers turned on Valentine and cost him the match. Afterwards Somers attacked Valentine. On May 15 Somers accompanied Vain and Sal Rinauro to the ring during their semi-final match in the NWA RPW tag team title tournament against Valentine and Kyle Matthews. Matthews and Valentine won the match. Somers interfered several times in the match. On May 29 Somers interfered in the finals of the tournament between Valentine and Matthews, and Cru Jones and Chip Day costing Valentine and Matthews the match.

His final match came on July 20, 2013, when he ventured to Northeast Championship Wrestling. In an Inglorious Gauntlet bout that featured also featured Brandon Behm, Tony Caruso, he closed out his career with in match that saw the defeat of Dean Livsley.

== Death ==
Somers died on May 16, 2017, at the age of 65.

== Championships and accomplishments ==
- American Independent Wrestling Federation
  - AIWF World Heavyweight Championship (1 time)
- American Wrestling Association
  - AWA World Tag Team Championship (2 times) - with Buddy Rose and Soldat Ustinov
- NWA Tri-State
  - NWA Tri-State Tag Team Championship (2 times) - with Ron McFarlane
- Western States Sports
  - NWA Western States Heavyweight Championship (1 time)
  - NWA Western States Tag Team Championship (1 time) - with Roger Kirby
