= Halloween Havoc (1995) =

World Championship Wrestling pay-per-view event

- VHS cover featuring Hulk Hogan
- Promotion: World Championship Wrestling
- Date: October 29, 1995 (Sumo Monster truck match was taped on October 28, 1995)
- City: Detroit, Michigan
- Venue: Joe Louis Arena
- Attendance: 13,000
- Buy rate: 110,000
- Tagline: There's Nowhere to Hide

Pay-per-view chronology
← Previous; Fall Brawl	Next → World War 3

Halloween Havoc chronology
← Previous; 1994	Next → 1996

The 1995 Halloween Havoc was the seventh annual Halloween Havoc professional wrestling pay-per-view (PPV) event produced by World Championship Wrestling (WCW). It took place on October 29, 1995, from the Joe Louis Arena in Detroit, Michigan for the second consecutive year.

== Production ==
=== Background ===
Halloween Havoc was an annual professional wrestling pay-per-view event produced by World Championship Wrestling (WCW) since 1989. As the name implies, it was a Halloween-themed show held in October. The 1995 event was the seventh event in the Halloween Havoc chronology and it took place on October 29, 1995, from the Joe Louis Arena in Detroit, Michigan for the second consecutive year.

=== Storylines ===
The event featured professional wrestling matches that involve different wrestlers from pre-existing scripted feuds and storylines. Professional wrestlers portray villains, heroes, or less distinguishable characters in the scripted events that build tension and culminate in a wrestling match or series of matches.

== Event ==
Other on-screen personnel
Role:	Name:
Commentators	Tony Schiavone
Commentators	Bobby Heenan
Commentators	Eric Bischoff (Sumo Monster truck match)
Commentators	Bob Chandler (Sumo Monster truck match)
Interviewers	Gene Okerlund
Interviewers	Mike Tenay
Ring announcers	Michael Buffer
Ring announcers	David Penzer
Referees	Randy Anderson
Referees	Nick Patrick

Sgt. Craig Pittman pinned VK Wallstreet after Jim Duggan hit Wallstreet with a taped fist. Duggan's interference came after Big Bubba Rogers hit Pittman with his own taped fist to knock him out. After Diamond Dallas Page entered the ring, a fake Johnny B. Badd appeared at the entranceway (played by Joey Maggs) to distract Page and allow the real Badd to sneak up on Page from behind. The Zodiac replaced Kamala, who had left WCW. During the match, a fan hopped the barricade and entered the ring. Savage and Zodiac fought to the outside until the referee and security could escort the fan away. Meng was disqualified after The Taskmaster interfered on Meng's behalf. Brian Pillman and Arn Anderson were disqualified when Ric Flair turned on Sting. Hulk Hogan's "Hulkster" truck (Bigfoot 15) pushed Giant's "Dungeon of Doom" truck (Bigfoot 8) out of the circle for the win. This match took place on top of the nearby Cobo Hall. Although it was portrayed as live, the match was actually taped the previous night. WCW stunt co-ordinator Ellis Edwards portrayed the referee for this match, and the commentary team was joined by Bigfoot creator Bob Chandler. After the match, Hogan and The Giant began fighting, resulting in the Giant (kayfabe) falling off the side of the building.

In the main event Hogan was disqualified after Hart hit the referee with the WCW World Heavyweight Championship belt. Hart then turned on Hogan by hitting him with the title belt and joined the Dungeon of Doom. After the match The Yeti came to the ring and assisted Giant by putting Hogan in a double bearhug, so that they were both crushing Hogan at the same time. Randy Savage came to the ring to try to save Hogan, as did Lex Luger. Lex Luger turned on Savage by attacking him and then put Hogan in the Torture Rack, joining the Dungeon of Doom. The Giant took the belt from the referee after the match and left with it; Hart later revealed that he had a clause put in the contract that the title could change hands on a disqualification, but a week later on Nitro, The Giant was stripped of the title, because the disqualification was due to Hart's interference. The title belt was later rewarded to the winner of the 3 ring 60 man Battle Royal at WCW World War 3 1995, which was won by Randy Savage.

== Results ==
No.	Results	Stipulations	Times
1^{ME}	Eddie Guerrero defeated Disco Inferno	Singles match	03:21
2^{ME}	Paul Orndorff defeated The Renegade	Singles match	01:22
3^{ME}	Chris Benoit and Dean Malenko defeated The Blue Bloods (Lord Steven Regal and Earl Robert Eaton)	Tag team match	08:41
4^{ME}	Craig Pittman defeated VK Wallstreet	Singles match	03:37
5	Johnny B. Badd defeated Diamond Dallas Page (c) (with The Diamond Doll and Max Muscle)	Singles match for the WCW World Television Championship	17:01
6	Randy Savage defeated The Zodiac	Singles match	01:30
7	Kurasawa (with Col. Robert Parker) defeated Road Warrior Hawk	Singles match	03:15
8	Sabu (with The Sheik) defeated Mr. JL	Singles match	03:25
9	Lex Luger defeated Meng by disqualification	Singles match	13:14
10	Sting and Ric Flair defeated Brian Pillman and Arn Anderson by disqualification	Tag team match	17:09
11	Hulk Hogan defeated The Giant	Sumo Monster truck match	05:00
12	Randy Savage defeated Lex Luger	Singles match	05:23
13	The Giant (with The Taskmaster) defeated Hulk Hogan (c) (with Jimmy Hart) by disqualification	Singles match for the WCW World Heavyweight Championship	14:30
(c) / – the champion(s) heading into the match; ME / – the match was broadcast prior to the pay-per-view on Main Event
