= Halloween Havoc (1990) =

World Championship Wrestling pay-per-view event

- VHS cover featuring Sting and Sid Vicious
- Promotion: National Wrestling Alliance: World Championship Wrestling
- Date: October 27, 1990
- City: Chicago, Illinois
- Venue: UIC Pavilion
- Attendance: 8,000
- Buy rate: 160,000
- Tagline: Terror Rules the Ring

Pay-per-view chronology
← Previous; The Great American Bash	Next → Starrcade

Halloween Havoc chronology
← Previous; 1989	Next → 1991

The 1990 Halloween Havoc was the second annual Halloween Havoc professional wrestling pay-per-view (PPV) event produced by World Championship Wrestling (WCW) under the National Wrestling Alliance (NWA) banner. It took place on October 27, 1990, from the UIC Pavilion in Chicago, Illinois. This was also the final Halloween Havoc produced by WCW under the NWA, as in January 1991, WCW split from the NWA.

On the original VHS release, only 6 of the 10 matches of the main broadcast were included as the fourth, fifth, sixth, and ninth matches of the show were not included. In 2014, all of WCW's Halloween Havoc PPVs became available on WWE's streaming service, the WWE Network; however, the WWE Network version of the 1990 Halloween Havoc is also edited and not the complete version as is usual for WCW's other PPVs on the Network from this period.

== Production ==
=== Background ===
On October 28, 1989, World Championship Wrestling (WCW) of the National Wrestling Alliance (NWA) held a Halloween-themed pay-per-view (PPV) event titled Halloween Havoc. A second Halloween Havoc was scheduled for October 27, 1990, at the UIC Pavilion in Chicago, Illinois, thus establishing Halloween Havoc as an annual PPV for WCW.

=== Storylines ===
The event featured professional wrestling matches that involve different wrestlers from pre-existing scripted feuds and storylines. Professional wrestlers portray villains, heroes, or less distinguishable characters in the scripted events that build tension and culminate in a wrestling match or series of matches.

Other on-screen personnel
Role:	Name:
Commentator	Jim Ross
Commentator	Paul E. Dangerously
Commentator	Jack Brickhouse; Taylor vs Irwin Match
Referee	Nick Patrick
Referee	Randy Anderson
Referee	Mike Atkins
Interviewer	Tony Schiavone
Ring announcer	Gary Michael Cappetta

== Event ==
Prior to the start of the event, there were two dark matches in which Tim Horner defeated Barry Horowitz and Rip Rogers defeated Reno Riggins.

In the opening match Tommy Rich and Ricky Morton defeated The Midnight Express (Bobby Eaton and Stan Lane), after Lane hit Rich with Jim Cornette’s tennis racket.

In the following match, Terry Taylor defeated Bill Irwin. Brad Armstrong then defeated J.W. Storm.

Following this match, The Master Blasters (Blade and Steel) defeated The Southern Boys (Tracy Smothers and Steve Armstrong). Armstrong attempted to attack Jim Cornette to stop him from interfering in the match, which allowed Steel to hit a clothesline on Armstrong and pick up the victory via pinfall.

In the following match, The Fabulous Freebirds (Jimmy Garvin and Michael Hayes) defeated The Renegade Warriors (Chris Youngblood and Mark Youngblood).

The Steiner Brothers (Rick Steiner and Scott Steiner) then defeated The Nasty Boys (Brian Knobbs and Jerry Sags) to retain the NWA United States Tag Team Championship. This match featured the Steiner Brothers using the double team bulldog off the top rope for the first time. Scott ultimately picked up the victory via pinfall on Knobbs following a Frankensteiner. After the match, The Nasty Boys attacked the Steiner Brothers with the championship belts, as well as the referee.

During the next match between the Junkyard Dog and Moondog Rex, Rex attempted to use his bone as a weapon. When the referee grabbed the bone, Junkyard Dog used the opportunity to hit a headbutt and pick up a pinfall.

In the next match for the NWA World Tag Team Championship, the champions Doom (Ron Simmons and Butch Reed) along with the challengers Ric Flair and Arn Anderson, wrestled to a double count out.

The second to last match, for the NWA United States Championship, saw Stan Hansen defeat Lex Luger to win the championship.

The main event, for the NWA World Heavyweight Championship saw Sting retain his title against Sid Vicious. Sid originally thought he won the match, after Sting hit a bodyslam off the top rope, with Sid falling on him to pick up the victory via pinfall. As fireworks went off and balloons dropped from the ceiling, Sting came out from the back and revealed the man in the ring was really Barry Windham. Windham had traded places with Sting during the main event, after Sid attacked him backstage before the match. The real Sting entered the ring, hit the Stinger Splash and picked up the victory. The show ended following Sting's interview with Jim Ross regarding the match and The Black Scorpion.

== Aftermath ==
The 1990 Halloween Havoc would be the final Halloween Havoc produced by WCW under the NWA banner, as in January 1991, WCW split from the NWA.

Stan Hansen ended Lex Luger's record 523-day reign as United States Heavyweight Champion, then returned to Japan shortly after dropping the title back to Luger at Starrcade. The Black Scorpion angle continued until Starrcade when it was revealed that Ric Flair was behind the character, in an attempt to regain the NWA World Heavyweight title.

The Midnight Express broke up after the PPV, Jim Cornette was tired of his and his team's treatment by Jim Herd so he and Stan Lane left to form Smoky Mountain Wrestling in 1991, but Bobby Eaton remained in the promotion and began a short singles career (even having a short reign with the WCW World Television Championship) before joining Paul E. Dangerously's "Dangerous Alliance" and teaming up with Arn Anderson.

== Home media and streaming ==
The event was released on home video in the United States and the United Kingdom by Turner Home Entertainment. In the UK, it was released in 1992. The event was edited down to under two hours and four of the originally broadcast matches were not included.

In 2014, the event was included on the WWE's streaming platform the WWE Network as part of its launch and remained on the service until the platform closed in 2026. In September 2026, WWE uploaded the home video cut of the event to stream freely on their WCW YouTube channel.

== Results ==
No.	Results	Stipulations	Times
1^{D}	Tim Horner defeated Barry Horowitz	Singles match	08:35
2^{D}	Rip Rogers defeated Reno Riggins	Singles match	03:57
3	Tommy Rich and Ricky Morton defeated The Midnight Express (Bobby Eaton and Stan Lane) (with Jim Cornette)	Tag team match	20:49
4	Terry Taylor defeated Bill Irwin	Singles match	11:47
5	Brad Armstrong defeated J.W. Storm	Singles match	05:04
6	The Master Blasters (Blade and Steel) defeated The Southern Boys (Tracy Smothers and Steve Armstrong)	Tag team match	07:17
7	The Fabulous Freebirds (Michael Hayes and Jimmy Garvin) (with Little Richard Marley) defeated The Renegade Warriors (Chris Youngblood and Mark Youngblood)	Tag team match	17:28
8	The Steiner Brothers (Rick Steiner and Scott Steiner) (c) defeated The Nasty Boys (Brian Knobbs and Jerry Sags)	Tag team match for the NWA United States Tag Team Championship	15:24
9	Junkyard Dog defeated Moondog Rex	Singles match	03:15
10	Doom (Ron Simmons and Butch Reed) (c) (with Teddy Long) vs. The Horsemen (Ric Flair and Arn Anderson) ended in a double count-out	Tag team match for the NWA World Tag Team Championship	18:20
11	Stan Hansen defeated Lex Luger (c)	Singles match for the NWA United States Heavyweight Championship	09:30
12	Sting (c) defeated Sid Vicious	Singles match for the NWA World Heavyweight Championship	12:38
(c) / – the champion(s) heading into the match; D / – this was a dark match

== See also ==
- 1990 in professional wrestling
