= Halloween Havoc (1991) =

World Championship Wrestling pay-per-view event

- Promotional poster featuring various WCW wrestlers
- Promotion: World Championship Wrestling
- Date: October 27, 1991
- City: Chattanooga, Tennessee
- Venue: UTC Arena
- Attendance: 8,900
- Buy rate: 120,000
- Tagline: An Evening of Terrifying Destruction!

Pay-per-view chronology
← Previous; The Great American Bash	Next → Starrcade

Halloween Havoc chronology
← Previous; 1990	Next → 1992

The 1991 Halloween Havoc was the third annual Halloween Havoc professional wrestling pay-per-view (PPV) event produced by World Championship Wrestling (WCW). The event took place on October 27, 1991, from the UTC Arena in Chattanooga, Tennessee. This was also the first Halloween Havoc held by WCW following its split from the National Wrestling Alliance (NWA) in January 1991.

The main event was a two out of three falls match, in which Lex Luger defeated Ron Simmons to retain the WCW World Heavyweight Championship. Another major match at the event was a Chamber of Horrors match between the team of El Gigante, Sting, and The Steiner Brothers (Rick Steiner and Scott Steiner) and the team of Abdullah the Butcher, The Diamond Studd, Cactus Jack, and Big Van Vader. Additionally, Brian Pillman was crowned the inaugural WCW Light Heavyweight Champion at the event by defeating Richard Morton in the finals of a tournament.

== Production ==
=== Background ===
Halloween Havoc was an annual professional wrestling pay-per-view event produced by World Championship Wrestling (WCW) since 1989. As the name implies, it was a Halloween-themed show held in October. The 1991 event was the third event in the Halloween Havoc chronology and it took place on October 27, 1991, from the UTC Arena in Chattanooga, Tennessee. This was also the first Halloween Havoc held by WCW alone following its split from the National Wrestling Alliance (NWA) in January 1991.

=== Storylines ===
The event featured wrestlers from pre-existing scripted feuds and storylines. Wrestlers portrayed villains, heroes, or less distinguishable characters in the scripted events that built tension and culminated in a wrestling match or series of matches.

== Event ==
Other on-screen personnel
Role:	Name:
Commentators	Jim Ross
Commentators	Tony Schiavone
Ring announcer	Gary Michael Cappetta
Interviewers	Eric Bischoff
Interviewers	Missy Hyatt

During the pre-show, Barry Windham was attacked by Arn Anderson and Larry Zbyszko and suffered a broken hand when they slammed his hand in a car door. In the opening match, Sting's team won after Cactus Jack accidentally pulled the switch while Abdullah the Butcher was in the electric chair. Originally, the match was supposed to feature El Gigante, Sting, and the Steiner Brothers against Oz, the Diamond Studd, the One Man Gang, and Barry Windham. Cactus replaced Oz, Big Van Vader replaced Windham, and Abdullah replaced Gang. One Man Gang was scheduled to take part in this match, but left WCW before the show. With Cactus Jack in the opening match, Oz replaced him against Bill Kazmaier. Doug Somers replaced the injured Michael Hayes, who was originally scheduled for the match against Van Hammer. The Phantom later revealed himself to be Rick Rude.

United States Tag Team Champions The Patriots challenged the Enforcers for the WCW World Tag Team Championship. The U.S. Tag Team Championships were not on the line.

This event also featured two matches utilizing the Refer-eye camera, where the referee wore a helmet with a camera to capture the action the referee sees.

== Home media and streaming ==
The event was released on home video in the United States and the United Kingdom by Turner Home Entertainment. In the UK, it was released in the summer of 1992 in the first batch of WCW home videos to be sold in Britain. The event was edited down to two hours and five matches were cut from the tape.

In 2014, the event was included on the WWE's streaming platform the WWE Network as part of its launch and remained on the service until the platform closed in 2026. In October 2026, the WWE uploaded the full event to their WCW YouTube channel.

== Results ==
No.	Results	Stipulations	Times
1	Sting, El Gigante and The Steiner Brothers (Rick Steiner and Scott Steiner) defeated Abdullah the Butcher, The Diamond Studd, Cactus Jack and Big Van Vader	Chamber of Horrors match	12:33
2	Big Josh and P. N. News defeated The Creatures (Creature 1 and Creature 2)	Tag team match	05:16
3	Bobby Eaton defeated Terrance Taylor (with Alexandra York)	Singles match	16:00
4	Johnny B. Badd (with Teddy Long) defeated Jimmy Garvin (with Michael Hayes)	Singles match	08:16
5	Steve Austin (c) (with Lady Blossom) vs. Dustin Rhodes ended in a time-limit draw	Singles match for the WCW World Television Championship	15:00
6	Bill Kazmaier defeated Oz by submission	Singles match	03:59
7	Van Hammer defeated Doug Somers	Singles match	01:13
8	Brian Pillman defeated Richard Morton (with Alexandra York)	Singles match for the inaugural WCW Light Heavyweight Championship	12:45
9	The Halloween Phantom defeated Tom Zenk	Singles match	01:27
10	The Enforcers (Arn Anderson and Larry Zbyszko) (c) defeated The Patriots (Todd Champion and Firebreaker Chip)	Tag team match for the WCW World Tag Team Championship	09:51
11	Lex Luger (c) (with Harley Race) defeated Ron Simmons (with Dusty Rhodes) 2-1	Two-out-of-three-falls match for the WCW World Heavyweight Championship	18:59
(c) / – the champion(s) heading into the match

=== Tournament brackets ===
Quarterfinals
Brian Pillman
BYE
Joey Maggs
Badstreet
Mike Graham
Terrence Taylor
Richard Morton
Johnny Rich

Semifinals
Brian Pillman
Badstreet
Mike Graham
Richard Morton

Final
Brian Pillman
Richard Morton

== Aftermath ==
Simmons would eventually capture the WCW World Heavyweight championship ten months later on August 2, 1992 defeating champion Big Van Vader who, like Luger, was managed by Race. Vader had beaten Sting for the title who had beaten Luger.

As a result of the attack by The Enforcers at the beginning of the show, a match was scheduled for Clash of the Champions XVII against Barry Windham and Dustin Rhodes even though Windham was not cleared to wrestle. This would lead to the return of Ricky Steamboat as Dustin's partner.

Rick Rude made a challenge to Sting during his debut promo. A match between the two would also take place at the Clash.

This marked the PPV return of "Ravishing" Rick Rude, who left WCW's predecessor company Jim Crockett Promotions for the WWF in 1987 whilst World Tag Team champions with Manny Fernandez. Rude left WWF earlier in 1991 after a four-year run. Kevin Nash would later shed the "Oz" gimmick and become "Vinnie Vegas". Brian Pillman would lose the Light Heavyweight title to Japanese star Jushin Thunder Liger later in 1991 before regaining it in a classic match at SuperBrawl II.
