= Halloween Havoc (1989) =

World Championship Wrestling pay-per-view event

- DVD cover featuring Animal and Hawk
- Promotion: National Wrestling Alliance: World Championship Wrestling
- Date: October 28, 1989
- City: Philadelphia, Pennsylvania
- Venue: Philadelphia Civic Center
- Attendance: 7,300
- Buy rate: 175,000
- Tagline: Settling the Score

Pay-per-view chronology
← Previous; The Great American Bash	Next → Starrcade

Halloween Havoc chronology
← Previous; First	Next → 1990

The 1989 Halloween Havoc was the inaugural Halloween Havoc professional wrestling pay-per-view (PPV) event produced by World Championship Wrestling (WCW) under the National Wrestling Alliance (NWA) banner. It took place on October 28, 1989, at the Philadelphia Civic Center in Philadelphia, Pennsylvania. As the name implies, it was a Halloween-themed event.

Eight matches were contested on the event. The main event was a Thunderdome match pitting Ric Flair and Sting against Terry Funk and The Great Muta. Flair and Sting won when Funk and Muta's manager Gary Hart threw in the towel for his team.

Other on-screen personnel
Role:	Name:
Commentator	Jim Ross
Commentator	Bob Caudle
Referee	Nick Patrick
Referee	Tommy Young
Referee	Bruno Sammartino (Thunderdome Match)
Interviewer	Gordon Solie
Interviewer	Chris Cruise
Ring announcer	Gary Michael Cappetta

== Production ==
=== Background ===
In 1989, World Championship Wrestling (WCW) of the National Wrestling Alliance (NWA) scheduled a Halloween-themed pay-per-view event for October 28, 1989, at the Philadelphia Civic Center in Philadelphia, Pennsylvania. The event was aptly named Halloween Havoc.

=== Storylines ===
The event featured wrestlers from pre-existing scripted feuds and storylines. Wrestlers portrayed villains, heroes, or less distinguishable characters in the scripted events that built tension and culminated in a wrestling match or series of matches.

== Aftermath ==
Ric Flair's feud with Terry Funk ended at Clash of Champions IX when Flair made Funk submit to the figure-four leglock in an "I Quit" match, then Gary Hart's J-Tex corporation began a full-scale feud with Fiair and Sting, but in early December Arn Anderson returned from the WWF and joined Flair, Sting, and Ole Anderson to reform the Four Horsemen. Tommy Young's long refereeing career in the NWA ended in November, 1989, during a TV taping of WCW Saturday Night when Tommy Rich knocked Young to the mat and into the ropes during a match, legitimately injuring his neck.

A second Halloween Havoc was scheduled for the following year, thus establishing Halloween Havoc as an annual PPV for WCW until 2000 (the 1989 and 1990 events were also the only two Halloween Havocs produced by WCW under the NWA as by late 1990, WCW / using "the NWA" as its trading name). The 2000 event was the final Halloween Havoc produced by WCW, as in March 2001, WCW was acquired by the World Wrestling Federation (WWF); the WWF was renamed WWE in 2002. In 2020, after 19 years since the acquisition of WCW, WWE revived Halloween Havoc as an annual event for their developmental brand, NXT.

== Results ==
No.	Results	Stipulations	Times
1	Tom Zenk defeated Mike Rotunda	Singles match	13:23
2	The Samoan SWAT Team (Fatu, The Samoan Savage and Samu) (with Oliver Humperdink) defeated The Midnight Express (Bobby Eaton and Stan Lane) and Steve Williams (with Jim Cornette)	Six-man tag team match	18:23
3	Tommy Rich defeated The Cuban Assassin	Singles match	08:29
4	The Fabulous Freebirds (Michael Hayes and Jimmy Garvin) (c) defeated The Dynamic Dudes (Shane Douglas and Johnny Ace) (with Jim Cornette)	Tag team match for the NWA World Tag Team Championship	11:28
5	Doom (Ron Simmons and Butch Reed) (with Woman) defeated The Steiner Brothers (Rick and Scott)	Tag team match	15:32
6	Lex Luger (c) defeated Brian Pillman	Singles match for the NWA United States Heavyweight Championship	16:49
7	The Road Warriors (Hawk and Animal) (with Paul Ellering) defeated The Skyscrapers (Sid Vicious and Dan Spivey) (with Teddy Long) by disqualification	Tag team match	11:39
8	Ric Flair and Sting (with Ole Anderson) defeated Terry Funk and The Great Muta (with Gary Hart)	Thunderdome match with Bruno Sammartino as special guest referee	23:46
(c) / – the champion(s) heading into the match
