= Vegas Connection: Casino Kara Ai wo Komete =

1989 video game

- Box art
- Developer: Graphic Research
- Publisher: Sigma Enterprises
- Designers: Takashi Kawashita; Isamu Ohnuma; Mitsutoshi Nomura
- Programmers: Yasuyuki Hamada; Kazushige Ishihara; Yasuhiro Shimano
- Composers: Hiroto Kanno; Mai Kidokoro
- Platform: Family Computer
- Release: JP: November 24, 1989
- Genres: Adventure; Casino
- Mode: Single-player

Vegas Connection: Casino Kara Ai wo Komete (ベガスコネクション ◆カジノから愛をこめて◆; "Las Vegas Connection: Call from the Casino") is a 1989 Nintendo Family Computer video game that was released exclusively in Japan.

== Plot ==
The player-controlled character Roberto is staying in Las Vegas with his girlfriend Marian in a motel room on a romantic vacation. He is summoned to the motel clerk to pay his hotel bill only to discover that Marian was apparently kidnapped by a mysterious person under the employment of Akiko.

He must then solve the mystery. Roberto must be able to pay the $800,000 in ransom money for the location of his girlfriend to be revealed. Key people show up in the adventure component of the game and give out advice whenever he makes a notable amount of money at blackjack. The first informant shows up after increasing Roberto's bankroll to $5,000 and the final informant appears once Roberto has $100,000 in his pocketbook.

== Gameplay ==
This screenshot shows the female dealer's reaction to a player victory.

The player can either choose to solve the mystery or go straight to the gambling games of blackjack, slot machines, and roulette instead. Most of the adventure component of the game is to find Marian's kidnapper and apprehend him. Key aspects of the game include searching everywhere, playing some gambling games to improve the financial situation, and grabbing clues in order to solve the mystery. Ultimately, Marian tells the player to give up gambling. Otherwise, she dumps Roberto even after he rescued her.

A female dealer officiates the table games. All the options are clearly in English, while dialogue is in Japanese. Up to $10,000,000 can be earned in the game. If the player runs out of money, the game instantly ends.
