= Von Wagner =

American professional wrestler (born 1994)

Personal information
- Born: Calvin Bloom; June 30, 1994 (age 32) Osseo, Minnesota, U.S.
- Education: University of Central Florida
- Parent: Wayne Bloom (father)

Professional wrestling career
- Ring names: Cal Bloom; Von Wagner
- Billed height: 6 ft 5 in (196 cm)
- Billed weight: 255 lb (116 kg)
- Billed from: Osseo, Minnesota, U.S.
- Trained by: Wayne Bloom; Ken Kennedy; Brad Rheingans; WWE Performance Center; Matt Bloom
- Debut: May 3, 2019

Calvin Bloom (born June 30, 1994) is an American professional wrestler and former college football player. He is performing for All Japan Pro Wrestling (AJPW), where he performs under his real name, stylized as Cal Bloom and is a member of HAVOC. He is best known for his tenure in WWE, where he performed under the ring name Von Wagner.

A second-generation professional wrestler, Bloom is the son of Wayne Bloom (who wrestled as Beau Beverly for the World Wrestling Federation (WWF) in the early 1990s).

== Early life ==
Bloom graduated from Osseo High School in 2012. He was a three-sport star, playing basketball, baseball, and football, earning three letters in each.

== Football career ==
After graduating high school, Bloom played football at the University of Central Florida (UCF). He played as a tight end for the UCF Knights from 2012 to 2016.

== Professional wrestling career ==
=== WWE (2019–2024) ===
In March 2019, it was announced Bloom was one of three recruits recently signed with WWE, and would report to the WWE Performance Center. He made his in-ring debut at a live event on May 3, 2019, teaming with fellow recruit Denzel Dejournette against Dan Matha and Riddick Moss in a losing effort. He continued wrestling at live events until March 2020, making his main roster debut on the April 10, 2020 episode of SmackDown, losing to Sheamus.

On September 14, 2021, he made his debut as a face on NXT with the new ring name Von Wagner, replacing Kyle O'Reilly, in a fatal four-way match for the vacant NXT Championship against LA Knight, Dunne and Tommaso Ciampa, which he lost. He then formed a tag team with O'Reilly, wrestling for the NXT Tag Team Championship at WarGames, being defeated by Imperium (Marcel Barthel and Fabian Aichner). After the match, Wagner attempted to attack O'Reilly from behind, but failed and got himself attacked instead, turning heel in the process. Two days later on NXT, Wagner defeated O'Reilly in a steel cage match.

Wagner acquired Mr. Stone as a manager in February 2022. On July 5, at NXT: The Great American Bash, Wagner began a feud with Solo Sikoa, culminating in a falls count anywhere match on the August 2 episode of NXT, which Wagner lost. On the October 4 episode of NXT, Wagner defeated Andre Chase to qualify for a ladder match for the NXT North American Championship at NXT Halloween Havoc on October 22, which was won by Wes Lee. The following month, Wagner faced the NXT Champion Bron Breakker, and failed to win the title from Breakker on the November 15 episode of NXT.

In June 2023, after opening up about his childhood struggles to Mr. Stone and reigniting his feud with Breakker, Wagner and Stone both turned face, shortly after Breakker himself turned heel. At NXT: Heatwave on August 22, Breakker attacked Wagner before his scheduled match against Baron Corbin and bludgeoned Wagner with a set of steel steps on the September 5 episode of NXT. Wagner returned from injury at Halloween Havoc on October 31, attacking Breakker after his match against Stone. On April 22, 2024, it was reported that Wagner had been released from WWE.

=== Independent circuit (2025–present) ===
Bloom, under his real name, made his return to wrestling on March 15, 2025 at Midwest All-Star Wrestling (MAW)'s event Mayhem At The Mall, defeating Shay Diesel. On March 27, Bloom made a cameo appearance for All Elite Wrestling (AEW) on that day's episode of Dynamite as a security guard trying to break up a brawl between Mark Davis and Powerhouse Hobbs. Bloom made his debut for Ring of Honor (ROH) on the April 3 episode of Ring of Honor Wrestling, teaming with Deonn Rusman in a losing effort to Gates of Agony (Bishop Kaun and Toa Liona).

=== All Japan Pro Wrestling (2026–present) ===
On September 22, 2026, Bloom was announced as the newest member of the All Japan Pro Wrestling (AJPW) stable "HAVOC". He made his debut for the promotion a month later during the Raising An Army Memorial Series tour, teaming with his HAVOC stablemates to defeat the Saito Brothers.

== Championships and accomplishments ==
- Pro Wrestling Illustrated
  - Ranked No. 439 in of the top 500 singles wrestlers in the PWI 500 in 2022
