= NXT: Halloween Havoc (2020) =

WWE television special

NXT Halloween Havoc
- Official event logo
- Promotion: WWE
- Brand: NXT
- Date: October 28, 2020
- City: Orlando, Florida
- Venue: Capitol Wrestling Center at WWE Performance Center
- Attendance: 0 (behind closed doors) (Note: The event was held without a paying audience due to the COVID-19 pandemic in the United States, though it featured a live crowd of WWE wrestlers, trainees, and select invited fans as well as virtual fans via NXT's Capitol Wrestling Center viewing experience.)

NXT special episodes chronology
| ← Previous; Super Tuesday | Next → New Year's Evil |

Halloween Havoc chronology
| ← Previous; 2000 | Next → 2021 |

The 2020 NXT: Halloween Havoc was a professional wrestling television special produced by WWE, held exclusively for wrestlers from the promotion's NXT brand division. It was WWE's first annual NXT Halloween Havoc, and the 13th Halloween Havoc overall, and aired as a special episode of the weekly series NXT on the USA Network. Due to the COVID-19 pandemic, the event took place on October 28, 2020, at the Capitol Wrestling Center, a bio-secure bubble that was hosted at the WWE Performance Center in Orlando, Florida. The show was hosted by NXT wrestler Shotzi Blackheart.

Halloween Havoc was previously held as an annual pay-per-view event by the former World Championship Wrestling (WCW) from 1989 to 2000. This 2020 event was the first Halloween Havoc held since the 2000 event, which was the last edition produced by WCW, as the company was acquired by WWE, then known as the World Wrestling Federation (WWF), in 2001; the WWF was renamed to WWE in 2002. With the scheduling of the 2021 event, Halloween Havoc became an annual event for NXT. This would also be the only Halloween Havoc held before NXT was rebranded as "NXT 2.0" in September 2021, which reverted NXT to a developmental brand for WWE.

Five matches were contested during the event. In the main event, Io Shirai defeated Candice LeRae in a Tables, Ladders, and Scares match to retain the NXT Women's Championship. In other prominent matches, Dexter Lumis defeated Cameron Grimes in a Haunted House of Terror match, and in the opening bout, Johnny Gargano defeated Damian Priest to win the NXT North American Championship in a Devil's Playground Match.

== Production ==
Other on-screen personnel
| Role: | Name: |
|---|---|
| Commentators | Vic Joseph |
| Commentators | Wade Barrett |
| Commentators | Beth Phoenix |
| Spanish commentators | Carlos Cabrera |
| Spanish commentators | Marcelo Rodríguez |
| Ring announcer | Alicia Taylor |
| Referees | Darryl Sharma |
| Referees | Dallas Irvin |
| Referees | Daphne Lashaunn |
| Referees | Derek Sanders |
| Referees | Blair Baldwin |
| Referees | Felix Fernandez |
| Pre-show panel | Sam Roberts |
| Pre-show panel | McKenzie Mitchell |
| Pre-show panel | Denise Salcedo |

=== Background ===
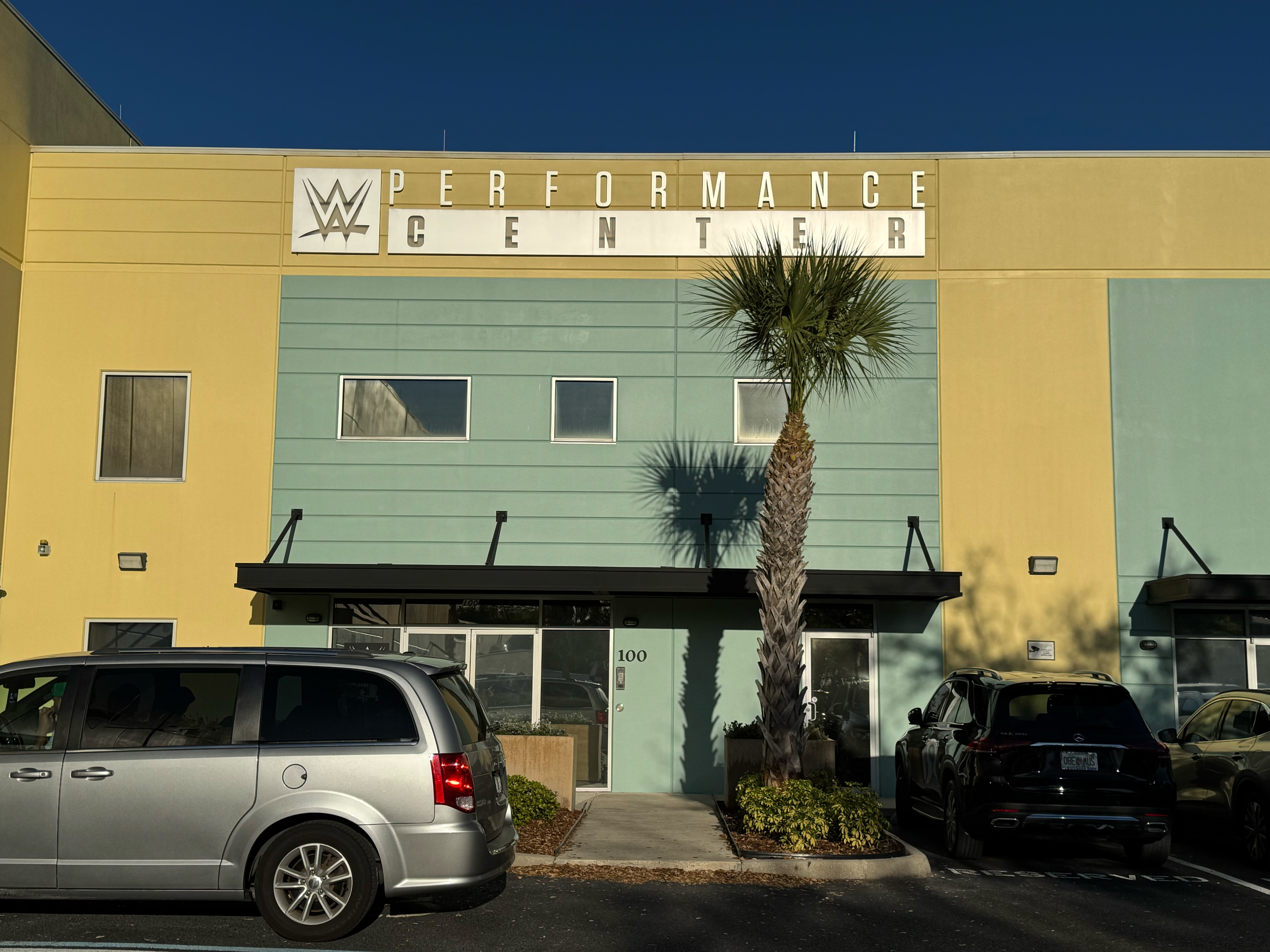
NXT's inaugural Halloween Havoc was held at the Capitol Wrestling Center, a bio-secure bubble that was hosted at the WWE Performance Center in Orlando, Florida.

Halloween Havoc was previously an annual professional wrestling pay-per-view (PPV) event produced by the former World Championship Wrestling (WCW) from 1989 to 2000. It was held in October as part of the month's Halloween festivities. The 2000 event was the final Halloween Havoc produced by WCW as WWE—at that time known as the World Wrestling Federation (WWF)—purchased WCW in 2001; WWF was renamed to WWE in 2002.

After 19 years since the acquisition of WCW, WWE announced that it would be reviving Halloween Havoc to be held as a television special for the company's NXT brand division. The event took place on October 28, 2020, and aired as a special episode of NXT on the USA Network. It was the 13th Halloween Havoc overall and NXT wrestler Shotzi Blackheart served as the host for the event.

==== Impact of the COVID-19 pandemic ====
Due to the COVID-19 pandemic, WWE's NXT events had to be presented from a behind closed doors set at NXT's home venue at the time, Full Sail University in Winter Park, Florida, since mid-March; WWE's programming for Raw and SmackDown were also done in this manner but at the WWE Performance Center in Orlando, Florida, before moving to Orlando's Amway Center in August in a bio-secure bubble called the WWE ThunderDome. In October 2020, it was announced that beginning with TakeOver 31, NXT would be moving their events to the Performance Center, which would feature a bio-secure bubble called the Capitol Wrestling Center. Like the ThunderDome for Raw and SmackDown, LED boards were placed around the Performance Center so that fans could attend virtually, while additionally and unlike the ThunderDome, friends and family members of the wrestlers were in attendance, along with a limited number of actual live fans, divided from each other by plexiglass walls.

=== Storylines ===
NXT: Halloween Havoc featured professional wrestling matches that involved different wrestlers from pre-existing scripted feuds and storylines. Results were predetermined by WWE's writers on the NXT brand, while storylines were produced on the weekly television program, NXT.

== Aftermath ==
With the scheduling of the 2021 event, Halloween Havoc became an annual event for NXT. The brand itself was rebranded as "NXT 2.0" in September 2021, reverting NXT to being a developmental brand for WWE.

== Results ==
| No. | Results | Stipulations | Times |
|---|---|---|---|
| 1 | Johnny Gargano defeated Damian Priest (c) | Spin the Wheel, Make the Deal: Devil's Playground Match for the NXT North American Championship | 21:06 |
| 2 | Santos Escobar (with Legado Del Fantasma) defeated Jake Atlas | Singles match | 3:28 |
| 3 | Dexter Lumis defeated Cameron Grimes by submission | Haunted House of Terror match | — |
| 4 | Rhea Ripley defeated Raquel González (with Dakota Kai) | Singles match | 13:02 |
| 5 | Io Shirai (c) defeated Candice LeRae | Spin the Wheel, Make the Deal: Tables, Ladders and Scares match for the NXT Women's Championship | 16:30 |
(c) / – the champion(s) heading into the match
