= Clash of the Champions =

World Championship Wrestling professional wrestling television program

- The Clash of the Champions logo from 1994 to 1997
- Also known as: NWA Clash of the Champions; WCW Clash of the Champions; NXT Clash of the Champions
- Genre: Professional wrestling
- Country of origin: United States
- Original language: English
- No. of episodes: 36

Production
- Production companies: National Wrestling Alliance (1–13); Jim Crockett Promotions (1–3); World Championship Wrestling (4–35); WWE (36)

Original release
- Network: TBS (1–35); Hulu (36)
- Release: March 27, 1988 – April 24, 2013

Related
- WCW Saturday Night; WCW WorldWide; WCW Monday Nitro; WCW Thunder; WCW Pro

Clash of the Champions is an American series of professional wrestling television specials that were produced by World Championship Wrestling (WCW) and Jim Crockett Promotions (JCP) in conjunction with the National Wrestling Alliance (NWA). The specials were supercards comprising pay-per-view caliber matches, similar to the World Wrestling Federation's (WWF, now WWE) Saturday Night's Main Event series. The Clash of the Champions shows were famous for typically not airing commercials during matches even though many of these matches lasted 20 minutes or more.

The first Clash of the Champions was held on March 27, 1988, by JCP, and was titled NWA Clash of the Champions. Subsequent events had different subtitles, for example, Clash of the Champions II: Miami Mayhem, up until Clash of the Champions XVI: Fall Brawl 1991, which was the last event with a subtitle. JCP was sold to Ted Turner and renamed WCW in 1988, and WCW continued to air the events until 1997. The rights to Clash of the Champions now belong to WWE, which acquired WCW in 2001. In 2013, WWE revived the Clash of the Champions name for a special episode of their WWE NXT program.

== History ==
Throughout 1987 and 1988, a bitter event scheduling war broke out between rival wrestling promoters Vince McMahon and Jim Crockett, Jr. On Thanksgiving night 1987, McMahon's World Wrestling Federation (WWF) aired Survivor Series against Starrcade from Crockett and the National Wrestling Alliance, two pay-per-view (PPV) events on the same day. At that time, many cable companies could only offer one live PPV event at a time, and furthermore were presented with an edict from the WWF saying that any cable company that chose to carry Starrcade would be barred from carrying any future WWF events. Hence, the WWF PPV was cleared 10–1 over Starrcade.

Following this incident, McMahon was warned by the PPV industry not to schedule PPV events simultaneously with the NWA again. However, he was still not willing to fully cooperate with Crockett, and on January 24, 1988, another scheduling conflict took place between the WWF and NWA. The NWA presented the Bunkhouse Stampede on PPV, while on the same night, the WWF aired the first Royal Rumble for free on the USA Network.

In 1988, with the WWF's WrestleMania IV around the corner, Crockett decided to give McMahon a taste of his own medicine. He aired his own supercard, Clash of the Champions for free on TBS on March 27, 1988 - the same night as WrestleMania. The first Clash was of PPV caliber and made Sting a star after he wrestled NWA World Champion Ric Flair to a 45-minute draw. WCW would repeat the practice again the following year with a Clash coinciding with the WWF's WrestleMania V. Although the main event of NWA Champion Ricky Steamboat defeating Flair in a best of three falls match was widely considered the best wrestling match that took place among the two promotions on that day, ratings and attendance for the event fell well below expectations due to the event not being advertised and the practice of conflicting major events would cease until the Monday Night War began in 1995.

Clash events continued on a sporadic basis over the next nine years, quickly changing focus to become a free marketing vehicle for NWA/WCW PPV events, similar to the WWF's Saturday Night's Main Event. WCW aired the 35th and last Clash of the Champions on August 21, 1997. In 1997 the determination was made to discontinue air Clash of the Champions due to the start of Thunder.

WWE, the owner of the WCW properties since 2001, resurrected the name for a special episode of WWE NXT, the flagship television program of their NXT developmental territory, in 2013. The special was filmed at Full Sail University on March 21, 2023, and aired on tape delay on April 24, 2013. Starting in 2016, WWE began holding the similarly named and conceptually similar but unrelated WWE Clash of Champions pay-per-view series.

Following a 25-year hiatus from Turner Sports, a spiritual successor to the Clash series was launched on TBS' sister channel, TNT, by All Elite Wrestling (AEW) as AEW Battle of the Belts, which aired on a quarterly basis from 2022 until 2024.

== Dates and venues ==
Event	Date	City	Venue	Main event	Ref
National Wrestling Alliance (Jim Crockett Promotions)
Clash of the Champions I	March 27, 1988	Greensboro, North Carolina	Greensboro Coliseum	Ric Flair (c) vs. Sting in a singles match for the NWA World Heavyweight Championship	
Clash of the Champions II: Miami Mayhem	June 8, 1988	Miami, Florida	James L. Knight Center	Arn Anderson and Tully Blanchard (c) vs. Sting and Dusty Rhodes in a tag team match for the NWA World Tag Team Championship	
Clash of the Champions III: Fall Brawl	September 7, 1988	Albany, Georgia	Albany Civic Center	Barry Windham (c) vs. Sting in a singles match for the NWA United States Heavyweight Championship	
National Wrestling Alliance (World Championship Wrestling)
Clash of the Champions IV: Season's Beatings	December 7, 1988	Chattanooga, Tennessee	UTC Arena	Ric Flair and Barry Windham vs. The Midnight Express (Bobby Eaton and Stan Lane in a tag team match	
Clash of the Champions V: St. Valentine's Massacre	February 15, 1989	Cleveland, Ohio	Cleveland Convention Center	The Road Warriors (Animal and Hawk) and Genichiro Tenryu (c) vs. The Varsity Club (Mike Rotunda, Kevin Sullivan and Steve Williams) in a six-man tag team match for the NWA World Six-Man Tag Team Championship	
Clash of the Champions VI: Ragin' Cajun	April 2, 1989	New Orleans, Louisiana	Louisiana Superdome	Ricky Steamboat (c) vs. Ric Flair in a 2 out of 3 falls match for the NWA World Heavyweight Championship	
Clash of the Champions VII: Guts and Glory	June 14, 1989	Fort Bragg, North Carolina	Ritz-Epps Fitness Center	Ricky Steamboat vs. Terry Funk in a singles match	
Clash of the Champions VIII: Fall Brawl '89	September 12, 1989	Columbia, South Carolina	Carolina Coliseum	Sting and Ric Flair vs. Dick Slater and The Great Muta in a tag team match	
Clash of the Champions IX: New York Knockout	November 15, 1989	Troy, New York	Houston Field House	Ric Flair vs. Terry Funk in an "I Quit" match	
Clash of the Champions X: Texas Shootout	February 6, 1990	Corpus Christi, Texas	Memorial Coliseum	The Four Horsemen (Ric Flair, Ole Anderson, and Arn Anderson) vs. Gary Hart International (The Dragonmaster, Buzz Sawyer, and The Great Muta) in a steel cage match	
Clash of the Champions XI: Coastal Crush	June 13, 1990	Charleston, South Carolina	McAlister Field House	Ric Flair (c) vs. Junkyard Dog in a singles match for the NWA World Heavyweight Championship	
Clash of the Champions XII: Mountain Madness/Fall Brawl '90	September 5, 1990	Asheville, North Carolina	Asheville Civic Center	Sting (c) vs. The Black Scorpion in a singles match for the NWA World Heavyweight Championship	
Clash of the Champions XIII: Thanksgiving Thunder	November 20, 1990	Jacksonville, Florida	Jacksonville Memorial Coliseum	Ric Flair vs. Butch Reed in a singles match	
World Championship Wrestling
Clash of the Champions XIV: Dixie Dynamite	January 30, 1991	Gainesville, Georgia	Georgia Mountains Center	Ric Flair (c) vs. Scott Steiner in a singles match for the WCW World Heavyweight Championship	
Clash of the Champions XV: Knocksville USA	June 12, 1991	Knoxville, Tennessee	Civic Auditorium	Ric Flair (c) vs. Bobby Eaton in a two-out-of-three falls match for the WCW World Heavyweight Championship	
Clash of the Champions XVI: Fall Brawl	September 5, 1991	Augusta, Georgia	Augusta-Richmond County Civic Center	Enforcers (Arn Anderson and Larry Zbyszko) vs. Rick Steiner and Bill Kazmaier in the WCW World Tag Team Championship tournament final	
Clash of the Champions XVII	November 19, 1991	Savannah, Georgia	Savannah Civic Center	Lex Luger (c) vs. Rick Steiner in a singles match for the WCW World Heavyweight Championship	
Clash of the Champions XVIII	January 21, 1992	Topeka, Kansas	Kansas Expo Center	Sting and Ricky Steamboat vs. Steve Austin and Rick Rude in a tag team match	
Clash of the Champions XIX	June 16, 1992	Charleston, South Carolina	McAlister Field House	Terry Gordy and Steve Williams vs. The Steiner Brothers (Rick Steiner and Scott Steiner) in the NWA World Tag Team Championship tournament quarter finals	
Clash of the Champions XX: 20th Anniversary	September 2, 1992	Atlanta, Georgia	Center Stage Theater	Rick Rude, Jake Roberts, Super Invader and Big Van Vader vs. Sting, Nikita Koloff and The Steiner Brothers (Rick Steiner and Scott Steiner) in a 4-on-4 elimination match	
Clash of the Champions XXI	November 18, 1992	Macon, Georgia	Macon Coliseum	Barry Windham and Dustin Rhodes (c) vs. Ricky Steamboat and Shane Douglas in a tag team match for the NWA World Tag Team Championship and the WCW World Tag Team Championship	
Clash of the Champions XXII	January 13, 1993	Milwaukee, Wisconsin	The MECCA	Dustin Rhodes, Sting and Cactus Jack vs. Big Van Vader, Barry Windham and Paul Orndorff in a Thundercage match	
Clash of the Champions XXIII	June 16, 1993	Norfolk, Virginia	Norfolk Scope	Ric Flair and Arn Anderson vs. The Hollywood Blonds (Brian Pillman and Steve Austin) in a two-out-of-three falls match for the NWA World Tag Team Championship and WCW World Tag Team Championship	
Clash of the Champions XXIV	August 18, 1993	Daytona Beach, Florida	Ocean Center	Big Van Vader (c) vs. defeated Davey Boy Smith in a singles match for the WCW World Heavyweight Championship	
Clash of the Champions XXV	November 10, 1993	St. Petersburg, Florida	Bayfront Arena	Vader (c) vs. Ric Flair in a singles match for the WCW World Heavyweight Championship	
Clash of the Champions XXVI	January 27, 1994	Baton Rouge, Louisiana	Riverside Centroplex	Sting and Ric Flair vs. Vader and Rick Rude in a tag team match	
Clash of the Champions XXVII	June 23, 1994	Charleston, South Carolina	North Charleston Coliseum	Ric Flair (World) vs. Sting (International) in a unification match for the WCW World Heavyweight Championship and the WCW International World Heavyweight Championship	
Clash of the Champions XXVIII	August 24, 1994	Cedar Rapids, Iowa	Five Seasons Center	Hulk Hogan (c) vs. Ric Flair in a singles match for the WCW World Heavyweight Championship	
Clash of the Champions XXIX	November 16, 1994	Jacksonville, Florida	Jacksonville Memorial Coliseum	Hulk Hogan, Sting and Dave Sullivan vs. The Three Faces of Fear (The Butcher, Avalanche and Kevin Sullivan) in a six-man tag team match with Mr. T as the special guest referee	
Clash of the Champions XXX	January 25, 1995	Paradise, Nevada	Caesars Palace	Hulk Hogan and Randy Savage vs. Kevin Sullivan and The Butcher in a tag team match	
Clash of the Champions XXXI	August 6, 1995	Daytona Beach, Florida	Ocean Center	Vader vs. Arn Anderson and Ric Flair in a handicap match	
Clash of the Champions XXXII	January 23, 1996	Paradise, Nevada	Caesars Palace	Ric Flair and The Giant vs. Hulk Hogan and Randy Savage in a tag team match	
Clash of the Champions XXXIII	August 15, 1996	Denver, Colorado	Denver Coliseum	Hollywood Hogan (c) vs. Ric Flair in a singles match for the WCW World Heavyweight Championship	
Clash of the Champions XXXIV	January 21, 1997	Milwaukee, Wisconsin	Wisconsin Center Arena	Lex Luger vs. Scott Hall in a singles match	
Clash of the Champions XXXV	August 21, 1997	Nashville, Tennessee	Nashville Municipal Auditorium	Scott Hall and Randy Savage (c) vs. Diamond Dallas Page and Lex Luger in a tag team match for the WCW World Tag Team Championship	
WWE
NXT Clash of the Champions	March 21, 2013 (aired April 24, 2013)	Winter Park, Florida	Full Sail University	Wade Barrett (c) vs. Bo Dallas in a singles match for the WWE Intercontinental Championship	
(c) – refers to the champion(s) heading into the match

== Results ==
=== National Wrestling Alliance (Jim Crockett Promotions) ===
==== Clash of the Champions I ====
Clash of the Champions I
- Promotion(s): Jim Crockett Promotions; National Wrestling Alliance
- Date: March 27, 1988
- City: Greensboro, North Carolina
- Venue: Greensboro Coliseum
- Attendance: 6,000

Clash of the Champions chronology
← Previous; First	Next → II

Clash of the Champions (known sequentially as Clash of the Champions I) took place on March 27, 1988, at the Greensboro Coliseum in Greensboro, North Carolina. There were 6,000 people in attendance and the show drew a 5.8 rating on TBS. This was aired head-to-head with WWF's WrestleMania IV. In a "College Rules" match, Mike Rotunda won with a cradle for the one-count pin 1:10 into the second round. In a match for the United States Tag Team Championship, The Fantastics' Tommy Rogers originally pinned The Midnight Express's Bobby Eaton to win the titles but the decision was reversed because Rogers' partner, Bobby Fulton, had thrown referee Randy Anderson over the top rope before the pinfall was made. The Road Warriors and Dusty Rhodes defeated The Powers of Pain and Ivan Koloff when The Barbarian accidentally hit his partner, The Warlord, with a diving headbutt. Animal wore a goalie mask during the match to protect his injured face.

Lex Luger and Barry Windham defeated Arn Anderson and Tully Blanchard for the World Tag Team Championship, when interference by the champions' manager J. J. Dillon backfired; Dillon held a chair on the apron, but Lex Luger whipped Arn Anderson into the chair.

In the main event, Sting challenged Ric Flair for the NWA World Heavyweight Championship. Flair's manager, J. J. Dillon, was suspended in a cage above the ring. As no wrestler scored a decision before the time limit expired, the decision was left to the judges appointed for this occasion: wrestling official Gary Juster awarded the match to Sting, while Penthouse model Patty Mullen decided in favor of Flair. Wrestling official Sandy Scott ruled the match a draw. No decision was announced for the remaining two judges, actors Jason Hervey and Ken Osmond, resulting in the match being ruled a draw and Flair retaining the title.

No.	Results	Stipulations	Times
1	Mike Rotunda (with Kevin Sullivan) defeated Jimmy Garvin (with Precious)	College Rules match	6:10
2	The Midnight Express (Bobby Eaton and Stan Lane) (c) (with Jim Cornette) defeated The Fantastics (Bobby Fulton and Tommy Rogers) by disqualification	Tag team match for the NWA United States Tag Team Championship	10:15
3	The Road Warriors (Animal and Hawk) and Dusty Rhodes (with Paul Ellering) defeated The Powers of Pain (The Barbarian and The Warlord) and Ivan Koloff (with Paul Jones)	Barbed wire match	3:39
4	Lex Luger and Barry Windham defeated Arn Anderson and Tully Blanchard (c) (with J. J. Dillon)	Tag team match for the NWA World Tag Team Championship	9:35
5	Ric Flair (c) vs. Sting ended in a time-limit draw	Singles match for the NWA World Heavyweight Championship	45:00
(c) / – the champion(s) heading into the match

==== Clash of the Champions II: Miami Mayhem ====
Clash of the Champions II
- Promotion(s): Jim Crockett Promotions; National Wrestling Alliance
- Date: June 8, 1988
- City: Miami, Florida
- Venue: James L. Knight Center
- Attendance: 2,400

Clash of the Champions chronology
← Previous; I	Next → III

Clash of the Champions II took place on June 8, 1988, at the James L. Knight Center in Miami, Florida. There were 2,400 people in attendance and the show drew a 4.8 rating on TBS. Throughout the show, wrestlers were being interviewed as they arrived to the building, most notably, Lex Luger who was attacked by The Four Horsemen and was busted open after being slammed head first into the trunk of his limosine. This would also be an important factor in the conclusion of Luger's match against Ric Flair at the 1988 Great American Bash. Kevin Sullivan was locked in a cage at ringside during the third match but stole the key from the Garvins’ valet Precious. Steve Williams ran in after the match to save the Garvins from a 3 on 2 beat down. Al Perez was disqualified when Larry Zbyszko interfered in the match attacking Nikita Koloff. The referee is knocked out near the end of the main event, prompting Flair and Barry Windham to interfere, resulting in a double disqualification.

No.	Results	Stipulations	Times
1	Barry Windham (c) (with J. J. Dillon) defeated Brad Armstrong	Singles match for the NWA United States Heavyweight Championship	13:35
2	The Fantastics (Bobby Fulton and Tommy Rogers) (c) defeated The Sheepherders (Luke Williams and Butch Miller) (with Rip Morgan)	Tag team match for the NWA United States Tag Team Championship	19:29
3	Jimmy Garvin and Ronnie Garvin (with Precious) defeated The Varsity Club (Rick Steiner and Mike Rotunda)	Tag team match	13:11
4	Nikita Koloff defeated Al Perez (with Gary Hart) by disqualification	Singles match	11:51
5	Arn Anderson and Tully Blanchard (c) (with J. J. Dillon) vs. Sting and Dusty Rhodes ended in a double disqualification	Tag team match for the NWA World Tag Team Championship	10:58
(c) / – the champion(s) heading into the match

==== Clash of the Champions III: Fall Brawl ====
Clash of the Champions III
- Promotion(s): Jim Crockett Promotions; National Wrestling Alliance
- Date: September 7, 1988
- City: Albany, Georgia
- Venue: Albany Civic Center
- Attendance: 3,700

Clash of the Champions chronology
← Previous; II	Next → IV

Clash of the Champions III took place on September 7, 1988, at the Albany Civic Center in Albany, Georgia. There were 3,700 people in attendance and the show drew a 5.4 rating on TBS. Fall Brawl would later become a regular PPV event for WCW. After the match Steve Williams ran to the ring to congratulate Brad Armstrong. Armstrong replaced Tim Horner, who left the company in August. Despite the match not being announced as a no-DQ match, Kevin Sullivan is not disqualified when Al Perez interferes in the match. Dusty Rhodes won the match by pinning Gary Hart and not the legal opponent Kevin Sullivan. The bout was originally scheduled as Rhodes and Dick Murdoch vs Al Perez and Ron Garvin. Garvin left the company in August and the bout was changed. Ivan Koloff had manager Paul Jones and The Russian Assassin at ringside. After accidentally costing Koloff the match, Paul Jones and the Russian Assassin attacked Koloff. Koloff was soon joined by a second masked Russian Assassin, turning Koloff face. Barry Windham was disqualified after hitting Sting with a chair. The referee did not see the chair shot but was informed of it by San Francisco 49er John Ayers, who came to ringside.

No.	Results	Stipulations	Times
1	Mike Rotunda (c) (with Kevin Sullivan) vs. Brad Armstrong ended in a time-limit draw	Singles match for the NWA World Television Championship	20:00
2	Nikita Koloff and Steve Williams defeated The Sheepherders (Luke Williams and Butch Miller) (with Rip Morgan)	Tag team match	17:07
3	Dusty Rhodes defeated Kevin Sullivan (with Gary Hart)	Singles match	6:59
4	Ricky Morton defeated Ivan Koloff (with Paul Jones and Russian Assassin #1)	Russian Chain match	9:52
5	Sting defeated Barry Windham (c) (with J. J. Dillon) by disqualification	Singles match for the NWA United States Heavyweight Championship	21:14
(c) / – the champion(s) heading into the match

=== National Wrestling Alliance (World Championship Wrestling) ===
==== Clash of the Champions IV: Season's Beatings ====
Clash of the Champions IV
- Promotion(s): World Championship Wrestling; National Wrestling Alliance
- Date: December 7, 1988
- City: Chattanooga, Tennessee
- Venue: UTC Arena
- Attendance: 8,000

Clash of the Champions chronology
← Previous; III	Next → V

Clash of the Champions IV took place on December 7, 1988, at the UTC Arena in Chattanooga, Tennessee. This was the first Clash of the Champions following the sale of Jim Crockett Promotions to Turner Broadcasting and the subsequent company name change to World Championship Wrestling. There were 8,000 people in attendance and the show drew a 4.5 rating on TBS. This show set up Starrcade '88. It was on this show that TBS/WCW experimented with a top down camera angle, which did not catch on. This is comparable to the "refer-eye" camera from Halloween Havoc '91. This was the finals of the tournament to crown new United States Tag Team champions; the titles were vacated when the Midnight Express won the NWA World Tag Team titles in September. Ron Simmons and Eddie Gilbert had originally lost to the Sheepherders in the semi-finals but the decision was reversed when the Sheepherders signed with the World Wrestling Federation to become the Bushwhackers. Both losing finalists would later win the title with other partners (Big Josh and Rick Steiner respectively.) Ivan Koloff pinned Paul Jones after hitting him with Jones’ own illegal object. Koloff had one arm tied behind his back during the entire match. The Russian Assassins attacked Koloff after the match only for the Junkyard Dog to make the save. Dusty Rhodes was disqualified for hitting Road Warrior Animal with a chair. Both Hawk and Sting had already interfered in the match. The Road Warriors chose Genichiro Tenryu to be the third member of the team on the December 10 edition of NWA World Championship Wrestling.

No.	Results	Stipulations	Times
1	The Fantastics (Bobby Fulton and Tommy Rogers) defeated Eddie Gilbert and Ron Simmons	Tag team match for the NWA United States Tag Team Championship tournament final	27:04
2	"Dr. Death" Steve Williams (with Kevin Sullivan) defeated The Italian Stallion	Singles match	15:17
3	Ivan Koloff defeated Paul Jones	Singles match	8:21
4	Road Warrior Animal (with Road Warrior Hawk) defeated Dusty Rhodes by disqualification	Singles match for control of the NWA World Six-Man Tag Team Championship	2:54
5	Ric Flair and Barry Windham (with J. J. Dillon) defeated The Midnight Express (Bobby Eaton and Stan Lane) (with Jim Cornette)	Tag team match	17:41

==== Clash of the Champions V: St. Valentine's Massacre ====
Clash of the Champions V
- Promotion(s): World Championship Wrestling; National Wrestling Alliance
- Date: February 15, 1989
- City: Cleveland, Ohio
- Venue: Cleveland Convention Center
- Attendance: 5,000

Clash of the Champions chronology
← Previous; IV	Next → VI

Clash of the Champions V took place on February 15, 1989, at the Cleveland Convention Center in Cleveland, Ohio. There were 5,000 people in attendance and the show drew a 4.6 rating on TBS. This show was warm up show for the Chi-Town Rumble PPV only 5 days later. Steven Casey was billed as "undefeated" coming into this match. The masked Blackmailer was Jack Victory who did double duty on the night (he was also Russian Assassin #2). Mike Rotunda replaced Kevin Sullivan in the match, Sullivan and Williams originally won the US titles. The main event match was declared a double disqualification when Sting, Junkyard Dog and Michael Hayes stormed the ring. Sting, JYD and Hayes were originally slated to face the Road Warriors and Tenryu but were locked in by Kevin Sullivan before the match. A Ric Flair scheduled interview resulted in a Ricky Steamboat confrontation and an unscheduled in-ring, and out-of-ring, brawl, resulting in Flair losing all his clothes except his socks and trunks. The ring announcer for the night was former IWA and WWF play-by-play announcer Jack Reynolds. Ricky Steamboat and Ric Flair had an in-ring contract signing for their match at Chi-Town Rumble.

No.	Results	Stipulations	Times
1	The Midnight Express (Bobby Eaton and Stan Lane) (with Jim Cornette) defeated The Russian Assassins (Russian Assassin I and Russian Assassin II) (with Paul Jones)	Tag team match	13:14
2	Butch Reed defeated Steven Casey	Singles match	17:36
3	Lex Luger defeated The Blackmailer (with Hiro Matsuda)	Singles match	12:53
4	The Varsity Club (Mike Rotunda and Steve Williams) defeated The Fantastics (Bobby Fulton and Tommy Rogers)	Tag team match for the NWA United States Tag Team Championship	13:25
5	Ricky Steamboat defeated Bob Bradley	Singles match	6:23
6	Rick Steiner defeated Rip Morgan	Singles match	4:40
7	The Road Warriors (Animal and Hawk) and Genichiro Tenryu (c) vs. The Varsity Club (Mike Rotunda, Kevin Sullivan and Steve Williams) ended in a double disqualification	Six-man tag team match for the NWA World Six-Man Tag Team Championship	5:53
(c) / – the champion(s) heading into the match

==== Clash of the Champions VI: Ragin' Cajun ====
Clash of the Champions VI
- Promotion(s): World Championship Wrestling; National Wrestling Alliance
- Date: April 2, 1989
- City: New Orleans, Louisiana
- Venue: Louisiana Superdome
- Attendance: 5,300

Clash of the Champions chronology
← Previous; V	Next → VII

Clash of the Champions VI took place on April 2, 1989, at the Louisiana Superdome in New Orleans, Louisiana. There were 5,300 people in attendance and the show drew a 4.3 rating on TBS. This show was used to build the WrestleWar 1989 PPV on May 7. Clash VI was held on the same day as WrestleMania V and on free TV in an attempt to hurt the PPV rating as per the first Clash the previous year.

The Samoan Swat Team defeated The Midnight Express when Fatu hit Bobby Eaton with Paul E. Dangerously's phone without the referee seeing it. This was the continuation of the Jim Cornette/Paul E. Dangerously feud that started when Dangerously brought the "Original Midnight Express" to WCW.

The Varsity Club (Mike Rotunda and Steve Williams) defeated The Road Warriors when Williams cradled Hawk for the pinfall. The match was marred by controversial officiating: referee Teddy Long refused to count a pinfall for the Road Warriors only moments before making a fast count on Williams pinning Hawk. Long was subsequently fired as a referee and became a manager.

NWA World Champion Ricky Steamboat was challenged by former champion Ric Flair in a two out of three falls match. The results of the falls were:

1. Flair pinned Steamboat after reversing an inside cradle in the first fall (19:33)
2. Steamboat forced Flair to submit with a double chickenwing in the second fall (34:54)
3. Steamboat pinned Flair after a failed double chickenwing attempt. Flair fell on top of Steamboat, both men's shoulders were down, but Steamboat got his left shoulder up before the three count in the third fall (55:49).

The replay would show that Flair's foot was under the bottom rope, allowing him to get one last rematch at WrestleWar 1989.

In non-televised dark matches, Sting made Rip Morgan submit to the Scorpion Deathlock and Lex Luger forced Jack Victory to submit with the Torture Rack. The announcers stated during the main event that these were two "standby matches" which would be screened live should the World title match end early. Both matches were later shown on NWA World Championship Wrestling.

Matches 4, 5, and 6 are edited out on the WWE Network showing.

No.	Results	Stipulations	Times
1	The Samoan Swat Team (Samu and Fatu) (with Paul E. Dangerously) defeated The Midnight Express (Bobby Eaton and Stan Lane) (with Jim Cornette)	Tag team match	20:32
2	The Great Muta (with Gary Hart) defeated Steven Casey	Singles match	8:11
3	The Junkyard Dog defeated Butch Reed (with Hiro Matsuda)	Singles match	9:56
4	Bob Orton (with Gary Hart) defeated Dick Murdoch	Singles match	0:33
5	The Varsity Club (Mike Rotunda and Steve Williams) (with Kevin Sullivan) defeated The Road Warriors (Animal and Hawk) (c) (with Paul Ellering)	Tag team match for the NWA World Tag Team Championship	11:40
6	Ranger Ross defeated The Iron Sheik by disqualification	Singles match	1:56
7	Eddie Gilbert and Rick Steiner (c) (with Missy Hyatt) defeated The Varsity Club (Dan Spivey and Kevin Sullivan)	Tag team match for the NWA United States Tag Team Championship	3:51
8	Ricky Steamboat (c) defeated Ric Flair 2-1	Two-out-of-three falls match for the NWA World Heavyweight Championship	55:32
9^{D}	Sting (c) defeated Rip Morgan by submission	Singles match for the NWA World Television Championship	6:42
10^{D}	Lex Luger (c) defeated Jack Victory	Singles match for the NWA United States Heavyweight Championship	8:02
(c) / – the champion(s) heading into the match; D / – this was a dark match

==== Clash of the Champions VII: Guts and Glory ====
Clash of the Champions VII
- Promotion(s): World Championship Wrestling; National Wrestling Alliance
- Date: June 14, 1989
- City: Fort Bragg, North Carolina
- Venue: Ritz-Epps Fitness Center
- Attendance: 3,100

Clash of the Champions chronology
← Previous; VI	Next → VIII

Clash of the Champions VII took place on June 14, 1989, at the Ritz-Epps Fitness Center in Fort Bragg, North Carolina. The show drew a 3.8 rating on TBS. This show was used to build the Great American Bash 1989 PPV on July 23. Jimmy Garvin replaced Terry Gordy who participated in the first round match; it was Garvin's debut as an official Freebird, although he had been an "undercover" Freebird since 1983. The Freebirds beat The Road Warriors in the first round while the Dynamic Dudes beat Jack Victory and Rip Morgan. Jack Victory once again appears at a Clash of Champions under a mask, having previously appeared as "Russian Assassin #2" and "The Blackmailer" when the bookers needed a generic heel. The Ding Dongs won after a flying kneedrop / flying elbow double team move The Ding Dongs were Jim Evans and Richard Sartain who only wrestled a handful of matches under this gimmick. Stan Lane pinned Samu after the Road Warriors ran in and attacked the Samoan Swat Team while the referee was knocked out. The Midnight Express beat Bob Orton, Jr. and Butch Reed in the first round while the Samoan Swat Team beat Ranger Ross and Ron Simmons. This match is one of the first the Steiner Brothers had together. Jim Cornette was attacked by Paul E. Dangerously early in the match and helped to the back by the Dynamic Dudes. Terry Funk is disqualified for hitting Ricky Steamboat with the microphone. Funk beat down on Steamboat after the match until Lex Luger made the save. After running Funk off Luger turns on Steamboat and attacks him as well.

No.	Results	Stipulations	Times
1	The Fabulous Freebirds (Jimmy Garvin and Michael Hayes) (with Terry Gordy) defeated The Dynamic Dudes (Johnny Ace and Shane Douglas)	Tag team match	7:14
2	Ranger Ross defeated The Terrorist	Singles match	1:25
3	The Ding Dongs (1 and 2) defeated Cougar Jay and George South	Tag team match	3:00
4	The Midnight Express (Bobby Eaton and Stan Lane) (with Jim Cornette) defeated The Samoan Swat Team (Samu and Fatu) (with Paul E. Dangerously)	Tag team match	6:00
5	Terry Gordy vs. Steve Williams ended in a double count-out	Singles match	6:26
6	Norman the Lunatic (with Teddy Long) defeated Mike Justice	Singles match	0:47
7	The Varsity Club (Mike Rotunda and Kevin Sullivan) defeated The Steiner Brothers (Rick Steiner and Scott Steiner) (with Missy Hyatt)	Tag team match	8:36
8	Sting (c) defeated Bill Irwin	Singles match for the NWA World Television Championship	3:14
9	The Fabulous Freebirds (Jimmy Garvin and Michael Hayes) defeated The Midnight Express (Bobby Eaton and Stan Lane) (with Jim Cornette)	Tag team match	10:03
10	Ricky Steamboat defeated Terry Funk by disqualification	Singles match	14:00
(c) / – the champion(s) heading into the match

==== Clash of the Champions VIII: Fall Brawl '89 ====
Clash of the Champions VIII
- Promotion(s): World Championship Wrestling; National Wrestling Alliance
- Date: September 12, 1989
- City: Columbia, South Carolina
- Venue: Carolina Coliseum
- Attendance: 2,600

Clash of the Champions chronology
← Previous; VII	Next → IX

Clash of the Champions VIII took place on September 12, 1989, at the Carolina Coliseum in Columbia, South Carolina. There were 2,600 fans in attendance and the show drew a 4.7 rating on TBS. This show was used to build the first ever Halloween Havoc PPV on October 28.

Tom Zenk made the Cuban Assassin pass out from the Sleeper hold. This was Zenk's WCW debut match.

Scott Steiner was tripped by either Missy Hyatt or Robin Green at ringside. It was later revealed to be Robin Green who would later go on to manage Doom in a feud with the Steiner Brothers. This was the Steiner Brothers’ first ever shot at a world tag-team title.

Dick Slater and The Great Muta were disqualified after Muta uses the Asian mist on Sting and Slater strikes Ric Flair with his cast. Slater was a substitute for an injured Terry Funk. After the match, Funk jumped Flair from behind and tried to suffocate Flair by putting a plastic bag over his head. The following week on Power Hour, Funk refused to apologize. After the match, Slater hit Sting in the leg with a branding iron. Brian Pillman ran out and performed cardiopulmonary resuscitation on an unconscious Flair.

No.	Results	Stipulations	Times
1	The Road Warriors (Hawk and Animal) (with Paul Ellering) defeated The Samoan Swat Team (Samu and Fatu) (with Paul E. Dangerously)	Tag team match	6:46
2	"Z-Man" Tom Zenk defeated The Cuban Assassin by submission	Singles match	3:36
3	Sid Vicious defeated Ranger Ross	Singles match	1:08
4	The Fabulous Freebirds (Michael Hayes and Jimmy Garvin) (c) defeated The Steiner Brothers (Rick Steiner and Scott Steiner) (with Missy Hyatt and Robin Green)	Tag team match for the NWA World Tag Team Championship	10:27
5	Brian Pillman defeated Norman the Lunatic (with Teddy Long)	Singles match	3:38
6	Steve Williams defeated Mike Rotunda	Singles match	7:04
7	Lex Luger (c) defeated Tommy Rich	Singles match for the NWA United States Heavyweight Championship	10:36
8	Sting and Ric Flair defeated Dick Slater and The Great Muta by disqualification	Tag team match	19:16
(c) / – the champion(s) heading into the match

==== Clash of the Champions IX: New York Knockout ====
Clash of the Champions IX
- Promotion(s): World Championship Wrestling; National Wrestling Alliance
- Date: November 15, 1989
- City: Troy, New York
- Venue: Houston Field House
- Attendance: 4,000

Clash of the Champions chronology
← Previous; VIII	Next → X

Clash of the Champions IX took place on November 15, 1989, at the Houston Field House in Troy, New York. There were 4,000 fans in attendance and the show drew a 4.9 rating on TBS.

This show mainly dealt with fallout from Halloween Havoc PPV and set up the Iron Man / Iron Team tournaments at Starrcade 1989.

The Road Warriors were disqualified when Hawk hit the referee. The Freebirds had actually lost the NWA World Tag Team Championship on November 1, but the match had not aired yet, so the Freebirds were introduced as the NWA World Tag Team champions. Eaton pinned Douglas after Jim Cornette hits Douglas with his tennis racket. Cornette was in a neutral corner at the start of the match before deciding to side with the Midnight Express.

"The Super Destroyer" marked Jack Victory's 4th "Masked Mystery Man" appearance at a Clash ("Russian Assassin #2", "The Blackmailer" and "The Terrorist").

The Steiner Brothers had actually won the NWA World Tag Team Championship on November 1, but the match had not aired yet, so The Steiners were not announced as the champions. The Skyscrapers were disqualified when Doom ran in and attacked the Steiner Brothers. During the match Sid Vicious punctures a lung and is replaced by "Mean" Mark Callous soon after. Woman's bodyguard Nitron makes his debut during the post match brawl between the Steiners, the Skyscrapers, Doom and the Road Warriors.

Lex Luger pinned Brian Pillman after hitting him with a chair while the referee was down. Sting saved Pillman from further attacks by Luger.

Ric Flair forced Terry Funk to say "I Quit" on the microphone due to the pain of the Figure Four Leglock. Gary Hart attacked Funk after the match and was quickly joined by The Great Muta. Sting saved Flair from the attack only to be attacked by Lex Luger. This match received a 5-star rating from Dave Meltzer.

No.	Results	Stipulations	Times
1	The Fabulous Freebirds (Michael Hayes and Jimmy Garvin) defeated The Road Warriors (Hawk and Animal) (with Paul Ellering) by disqualification	Tag team match	5:18
2	Doom (Doom #1 and Doom #2) (with Woman) defeated Eddie Gilbert and Tommy Rich	Tag team match	5:15
3	The Midnight Express (Bobby Eaton and Stan Lane) (with Jim Cornette) defeated The Dynamic Dudes (Shane Douglas and Johnny Ace)	Tag team match	9:22
4	Steve Williams defeated The Super Destroyer	Singles match	1:41
5	The Steiner Brothers (Rick Steiner and Scott Steiner) defeated The Skyscrapers (Sid Vicious and Dan Spivey) (with Teddy Long) by disqualification	Tag team match	6:08
6	Lex Luger (c) defeated Brian Pillman	Singles match for the NWA United States Heavyweight Championship	12:38
7	Ric Flair defeated Terry Funk (with Gary Hart)	"I Quit" match	18:33
(c) / – the champion(s) heading into the match

==== Clash of the Champions X: Texas Shootout ====
Clash of the Champions X
- Promotion(s): World Championship Wrestling; National Wrestling Alliance
- Date: February 6, 1990
- City: Corpus Christi, Texas
- Venue: Memorial Coliseum
- Attendance: 3,000

Clash of the Champions chronology
← Previous; IX	Next → XI

Clash of the Champions X took place on February 6, 1990, at the Memorial Coliseum in Corpus Christi, Texas. There were 3,000 fans in attendance and the show drew a 4.5 rating on TBS. This was the show that set up WrestleWar. Norman the Lunatic pinned Kevin Sullivan behind closed doors in the women's bathroom. The Skyscrapers were disqualified for bringing a chair into the ring. Doom was unmasked as Ron Simmons and Butch Reed. In the main event Arn Anderson pinned The Dragonmaster after a DDT. Sting was originally scheduled to be in the match but was kicked out of the Horsemen earlier in the night and replaced with Ole Anderson. During the match Sting ran to the ring and tried to climb into the cage. During the ensuing brawl Sting blew out his knee.

No.	Results	Stipulations	Times
1	Steve Williams defeated Samoan Savage (with The Big Kahuna)	Singles match	7:55
2	Brian Pillman and Tom Zenk defeated The MOD Squad (Spike and Basher)	Tag team match	9:53
3	Mil Máscaras defeated Cactus Jack Manson	Singles match	5:00
4	Norman the Lunatic defeated Kevin Sullivan	Falls Count Anywhere match	7:26
5	The Road Warriors (Hawk and Animal) (with Paul Ellering) defeated The Skyscrapers (Dan Spivey and Mark Callous) (with Teddy Long) by disqualification	Tag team match	7:26
6	The Steiner Brothers (Rick and Scott) (c) defeated Doom (Doom #1 and Doom #2)	Title vs. Mask match for the NWA World Tag Team Championship	13:04
7	The Four Horsemen (Ric Flair, Ole and Arn Anderson) defeated J-Tex Corporation (The Dragonmaster, Buzz Sawyer, and The Great Muta)	Steel Cage match	6:10
(c) / – the champion(s) heading into the match

==== Clash of the Champions XI: Coastal Crush ====
Clash of the Champions XI
- Promotion(s): World Championship Wrestling; National Wrestling Alliance
- Date: June 13, 1990
- City: Charleston, South Carolina
- Venue: McAlister Field House
- Attendance: 4,100

Clash of the Champions chronology
← Previous; X	Next → XII

Clash of the Champions XI took place on June 13, 1990, in Charleston, South Carolina. There were 4,100 fans in attendance at the McAlister Field House on the campus of The Citadel and the show drew a 4.1 rating on TBS. This was the buildup show for The Great American Bash. Bam Bam Bigelow was disqualified when he refused to break his chokehold on Tommy Rich by the 5-count. The Midnight Express were disqualified after Stan Lane grabbed the referee to break up a pin count. Ric Flair was disqualified when the Four Horsemen interfered in the match.

No.	Results	Stipulations	Times
1	The Southern Boys (Steve Armstrong and Tracy Smothers) defeated The Fabulous Freebirds (Michael Hayes and Jimmy Garvin)	Tag team match	7:29
2	Tommy Rich defeated Bam Bam Bigelow (with Oliver Humperdink) by disqualification	Singles match	3:46
3	Tom Zenk and Mike Rotunda defeated Fatu and Samoan Savage	Tag team match	5:25
4	Mean Mark (with Paul E. Dangerously) defeated Brian Pillman	Singles match	5:40
5	The Rock 'n' Roll Express (Ricky Morton and Robert Gibson) defeated The Midnight Express (Bobby Eaton and Stan Lane) (c) (with Jim Cornette) by disqualification	Tag team match for the NWA United States Tag Team Championship	12:08
6	Barry Windham defeated Doug Furnas	Singles match	5:40
7	Lex Luger (c) defeated Sid Vicious (with Ole Anderson)	Singles match for the NWA United States Heavyweight Championship	0:26
8	Doom (Ron Simmons and Butch Reed) (c) (with Teddy Long) defeated The Steiner Brothers (Rick Steiner and Scott Steiner)	Tag team match for the NWA World Tag Team Championship	11:19
9	Paul Orndorff defeated Arn Anderson	Singles match	11:39
10	Junkyard Dog defeated Ric Flair (c) (with Ole Anderson) by disqualification	Singles match for the NWA World Heavyweight Championship	6:37
(c) / – the champion(s) heading into the match

==== Clash of the Champions XII: Mountain Madness/Fall Brawl '90 ====
Clash of the Champions XII
- Promotion(s): World Championship Wrestling; National Wrestling Alliance
- Date: September 5, 1990
- City: Asheville, North Carolina
- Venue: Asheville Civic Center
- Attendance: 4,000

Clash of the Champions chronology
← Previous; XI	Next → XIII

Clash of the Champions XII took place on September 5, 1990, at the Asheville Civic Center in Asheville, North Carolina. There were 4,000 fans in attendance and the show drew a 5.0 rating on TBS. The Master Blasters debuted at this event, however, after approximately one week Iron was replaced by Blade. Ric Flair was disqualified due to interference by Stan Hansen. After their match, Sting attempted to unmask the Black Scorpion, tearing away his black mask only to reveal a red mask underneath. The Scorpion quickly escaped when the "real" Black Scorpion appeared on the entrance ramp. Although he was never truly unmasked, the Black Scorpion that Sting wrestled was Al Perez.

No.	Results	Stipulations	Times
1	The Southern Boys (Tracy Smothers and Steve Armstrong) (with Bob Armstrong) defeated The Fabulous Freebirds (Michael Hayes and Jimmy Garvin) (with Buddy Roberts)	Tag team match	8:34
2	Mike Rotunda defeated Buddy Landel	Singles match	5:39
3	The Master Blasters (Iron and Steel) defeated Brad Armstrong and Tim Horner	Tag team match	4:52
4	The Nasty Boys (Jerry Sags and Brian Knobbs) defeated Jackie Fulton and Terry Taylor	Tag team match	7:11
5	Tommy Rich defeated Bill Irwin	Singles match	3:59
6	Susan Sexton (c) defeated Bambi	Singles match for the LPWA Championship	4:11
7	The Steiner Brothers (Rick Steiner and Scott Steiner) defeated Maximum Overdrive (Tim Hunt and Jeff Warner) (c)	Tag team match for the PWA Tag Team Championship	6:23
8	Stan Hansen defeated "Z-Man" Tom Zenk	Singles match	3:19
9	Lex Luger (c) defeated Ric Flair by disqualification	Singles match for the NWA United States Heavyweight Championship	15:28
10	Sting (c) defeated The Black Scorpion	Singles match for the NWA World Heavyweight Championship	8:13
(c) / – the champion(s) heading into the match

==== Clash of the Champions XIII: Thanksgiving Thunder ====
Clash of the Champions XIII
- Promotion(s): World Championship Wrestling; National Wrestling Alliance
- Date: November 20, 1990
- City: Jacksonville, Florida
- Venue: Jacksonville Memorial Coliseum
- Attendance: 5,000

Clash of the Champions chronology
← Previous; XII	Next → XIV

Clash of the Champions XIII took place on November 20, 1990, at the Jacksonville Memorial Coliseum in Jacksonville, Florida. There were 5,000 fans in attendance and the show drew a 4.2 rating on TBS. This Clash of the Champions set up for Starrcade '90: Collision Course. The first match was originally scheduled as a 6-man tag team match with Bobby Eaton on the Fabulous Freebirds' team and El Gigante on the Southern Boys team, but before the match El Gigante was "injured" by the Freebirds, and the match was therefore changed to a regular tag team match. Ric Flair and Butch Reed both won coin tosses to determine who would represent their respective teams, while their respective partners Arn Anderson and Ron Simmons remained at ringside. Since Flair won, Flair and Anderson earned a rematch against Doom for the NWA World Tag Team titles at Starrcade and Teddy Long had to be Flair's chauffeur for a day. Had Butch Reed won, Teddy Long would have gotten the yacht and limosine and there would have been no rematch at Starrcade.

No.	Results	Stipulations	Times
1	The Fabulous Freebirds (Jimmy Garvin and Michael Hayes) (with Bobby Eaton and Little Richard Marley) defeated The Southern Boys (Tracy Smothers and Steve Armstrong)	Tag team match	4:50
2	Brian Pillman defeated Buddy Landel	Singles match	5:52
3	Big Cat defeated Brad Armstrong by submission	Singles match	4:31
4	Tom Zenk defeated Brian Lee	Singles match	3:10
5	Michael Wallstreet (with Ms. Alexandra York) defeated The Starblazer	Singles match	4:15
6	Sgt. Krueger and Col. DeKlerk defeated The Beast and Kalua	Pat O'Connor Memorial Tournament qualifying match	4:48
7	Lex Luger defeated The Motor City Madman	Singles match	2:34
8	The Renegade Warriors (Chris Youngblood and Mark Youngblood) defeated The Nasty Boys (Brian Knobs and Jerry Sags) by disqualification	Tag team match	4:49
9	Sid Vicious defeated The Nightstalker	Singles match	3:30
10	The Steiner Brothers (Rick Steiner and Scott Steiner) (c) defeated Magnum Force	Tag team match for the NWA United States Tag Team Championship	1:57
11	Ric Flair (with Arn Anderson) defeated Butch Reed (with Ron Simmons and Teddy Long)	Singles match	14:13
(c) / – the champion(s) heading into the match

=== World Championship Wrestling ===
==== Clash of the Champions XIV: Dixie Dynamite ====
Clash of the Champions XIV
- Promotion: World Championship Wrestling
- Date: January 30, 1991
- City: Gainesville, Georgia
- Venue: Georgia Mountains Center
- Attendance: 2,200

Clash of the Champions chronology
← Previous; XIII	Next → XV

Clash of the Champions XIV took place on January 30, 1991, at the Georgia Mountains Center in Gainesville, Georgia. There were 2,200 fans in attendance and the show drew a 3.9 rating on TBS. This was the first Clash of Champions event not to be produced by the NWA. Dusty Rhodes returned to WCW, following a stint in the WWF, as the new booker and as color commentator. It was originally set to be held at the CNN Center in Atlanta, but due to security reasons arising from the escalation of the Persian Gulf War, it was moved to the Georgia Mountains Center in Gainesville. Doom was disqualified due to Sting being tossed over the top rope by Butch Reed. Tom Zenk lost the WCW World Television Championship in a match taped on January 7, but the match had not yet aired, so Zenk was billed as champion.

The event was poorly received by fans. A fan poll in the February 18, 1991, issue of the Wrestling Observer Newsletter showed only 79 out of 394 responding fans gave the show a "thumbs up" vote, with 48 voting "thumbs in between" and 267 voting "thumbs down." Ric Flair and Scott Steiner received the most votes for the event's best match, with 54. El Cubano vs. Ranger Ross received the most votes for the worst match of the night, with 45.

No.	Matches*	Stipulations	Times
1	Sting and Lex Luger defeated Doom (Ron Simmons and Butch Reed) (c) by disqualification	Tag team match for the WCW World Tag Team Championship	10:33
2	Tom Zenk (c) defeated Bobby Eaton	Singles match for the WCW World Television Championship	7:08
3	The Fabulous Freebirds (Michael Hayes and Jimmy Garvin) defeated Tommy Rich and Allen Iron Eagle	Tag team match	5:53
4	Sid Vicious defeated Joey Maggs	Singles match	1:11
5	Terry Taylor (with Alexandra York) defeated Ricky Morton	Singles match	11:53
6	Ranger Ross defeated El Cubano	Singles match	3:05
7	The Horsemen (Arn Anderson and Barry Windham( defeated The Renegade Warriors (Chris and Mark Youngblood)	Tag team match	7:30
8	Brian Pillman defeated Buddy Lee Parker	Singles match	3:17
9	Ric Flair (c) fought Scott Steiner (with Rick Steiner) to a draw.	Singles match for the WCW World Heavyweight Championship	24:25
(c) / – the champion(s) heading into the match; *Card subject to change

==== Clash of the Champions XV: Knocksville USA ====
Clash of the Champions XV
- Promotion: World Championship Wrestling
- Date: June 12, 1991
- City: Knoxville, Tennessee
- Venue: Civic Auditorium
- Attendance: 5,000

Clash of the Champions chronology
← Previous; XIV	Next → XVI

Clash of the Champions XV took place on June 12, 1991, at the Civic Auditorium in Knoxville, Tennessee. There were 5,000 fans in attendance and the show drew a 3.9 rating on TBS. Steve Armstrong pinned Jimmy Garvin, Tracy Smothers pinned Badstreet, and Tom Zenk pinned Michael Hayes simultaneously. Terrance Taylor was disqualified when Richard Morton interfered. In the loser of the fall-leaves-WCW tag team match Pillman was pinned, thus the storyline was that he was forced to leave WCW. Pillman would continue to wrestle in WCW under a mask as The Yellow Dog until September 1991. Masahiro Chono replaced Kensuke Sasaki in the tag team match. During the match, Scott Steiner tore his bicep. After the match, The Hardliners (Dick Slater and Dick Murdoch) attacked both teams. The WCW World Tag Team Championship, which The Steiners also held, was not on the line in this event. Steve Austin won the WCW World Television Championship on June 3, but the match did not air yet, so Austin was not the champion on this show. In the first fall, Bobby Eaton pinned Ric Flair, in the second fall, Eaton was counted out, in the third fall, Flair pinned Eaton to win the match. Eaton's WCW World Television Championship was not on the line, although he lost the title to Steve Austin on June 3, but the match had not aired yet, so he was still recognized as champion. This was the last Clash of Champions until 1993 for Flair, as he was soon stripped of the WCW World Title by Jim Herd due to a contract dispute. This led to Flair departing for the WWF.

No.	Results	Stipulations	Times
1^{D}	Rikki Nelson defeated El Cubano	Singles match	—
2	The Young Pistols (Tracy Smothers and Steve Armstrong) and Tom Zenk defeated The Fabulous Freebirds (Michael Hayes, Jimmy Garvin and Badstreet)	Six-man tag team match	4:49
3	Oz (with The Wizard) defeated Johnny Rich	Singles match	1:29
4	Dan Spivey defeated Big Josh	Singles match	2:49
5	Dustin Rhodes defeated Terrance Taylor (with Alexandra York and Mr. Hughes) by disqualification	Singles match	4:27
6	Sting defeated Nikita Koloff	Singles match	9:33
7	Arn Anderson and Barry Windham defeated Brian Pillman and El Gigante	Loser Leaves WCW match	3:08
8	The Steiner Brothers (Rick and Scott) (c) defeated Masahiro Chono and Hiroshi Hase	Tag team match for the IWGP Tag Team Championship	8:14
9	The Diamond Studd (with Diamond Dallas Page) defeated Tommy Rich	Singles match	1:59
10	Lex Luger defeated The Great Muta	Singles match	3:43
11	Steve Austin defeated Joey Maggs	Singles match	0:25
12	Ric Flair (c) defeated Bobby Eaton 2-1	Two-out-of-three falls match for the WCW World Heavyweight Championship	14:26
(c) / – the champion(s) heading into the match; D / – this was a dark match

==== Clash of the Champions XVI: Fall Brawl ====
Clash of the Champions XVI
- Promotion: World Championship Wrestling
- Date: September 5, 1991
- City: Augusta, Georgia
- Venue: Augusta-Richmond County Civic Center
- Attendance: 2,800

Clash of the Champions chronology
← Previous; XV	Next → XVII

Clash of the Champions XVI took place on September 5, 1991, at the Augusta-Richmond County Civic Center in Augusta, Georgia. There were 2,800 fans in attendance and the show drew a 3.7 rating on TBS. The Patriots defeated the Fabulous Freebirds to win the WCW United States Tag Team Championship on August 12, but the match did not air yet, so the Freebirds were announced as the champions. Furthermore, the titles were not on the line, making it a non-title match. Larry Zbyszko pinned Bill Kazmaier. The titles were vacated on July 18, 1991, when one half of the reigning WCW World Tag Team Champions The Steiner Brothers, Scott Steiner, was injured. Steiner and Kazmaier defeated The Ringlords and One Man Gang and The Executioner to advance to the finals, while The Enforcers defeated The Young Pistols and The Patriots to advance to the finals. Earlier in the evening, Kazmaier was performing "feats of strength" in the ring when Anderson and Zbyszko attacked and injured his ribs with a weight plate. They exploited this injury during the actual match to gain the victory and the Tag Team titles.

No.	Results	Stipulations	Times
1	El Gigante won by last eliminating One Man Gang and Oz (Note: Order of elimination from first eliminated: Terrance Taylor, Ranger Ross, Big Josh, Thomas Rich, Sgt. Buddy Lee Parker, "Z-Man" Tom Zenk, Young Pistol Tracy, Bobby Eaton, P. N. News, Steve Austin, Barry Windham, Dustin Rhodes, One Man Gang and Oz.)	15-man battle royal	9:33
2	Brian Pillman defeated Badstreet	Singles match	6:52
3	Sting (c) defeated Johnny B. Badd (with Teddy Long)	Singles match for the WCW United States Heavyweight Championship	6:11
4	Richard Morton (with Alexandra York) defeated Mike Graham	Singles match	7:40
5	The Fabulous Freebirds (Michael Hayes and Jimmy Garvin) defeated The Patriots (Todd Champion and Firebreaker Chip)	Tag team match	5:42
6	Ron Simmons defeated The Diamond Studd	Singles match	2:25
7	Van Hammer defeated Terrance Taylor (with Alexandra York)	Singles match	1:07
8	Steve Austin (c) (with Lady Blossom) defeated Tom Zenk	Singles match for the WCW World Television Championship	9:07
9	The Enforcers (Arn Anderson and Larry Zbyszko) defeated Rick Steiner and Bill Kazmaier	Tag team match for the vacant WCW World Tag Team Championship	3:33
(c) / – the champion(s) heading into the match

==== Clash of the Champions XVII ====
Clash of the Champions XVII
- Promotion: World Championship Wrestling
- Date: November 19, 1991
- City: Savannah, Georgia
- Venue: Savannah Civic Center
- Attendance: 6,922

Clash of the Champions chronology
← Previous; XVI	Next → XVIII

Clash of the Champions XVII took place on November 19, 1991, at the Savannah Civic Center in Savannah, Georgia. There were 6,922 fans in attendance and the show drew a 4.3 rating on TBS.
Prior to this show, Sting had received "Mystery Boxes" which revealed Cactus Jack and Abdullah The Butcher. This Clash was to reveal who was actually sending the boxes to Sting. It turned out to be Lex Luger. A match involving Arachnaman and Richard Morton was scheduled for this show, but ended up not taking place. Thomas Rich's partner in the York Foundation, Terrence Taylor actually tripped Rich up, allowing Josh to pin Rich. Ricky Steamboat was a surprise replacement partner for Barry Windham.

No.	Results	Stipulations	Times
1	Big Josh defeated Thomas Rich (with Alexandra York)	Lumberjack match	6:03
2	Bobby Eaton defeated Firebreaker Chip	Singles match	4:52
3	Tom Zenk defeated The Diamond Studd	Singles match	1:24
4	Steve Austin (c) (with Lady Blossom) defeated P. N. News	Singles match for the WCW World Television Championship	4:21
5	Cactus Jack defeated Van Hammer	Singles match	4:03
6	Dustin Rhodes and Ricky Steamboat (with Barry Windham) defeated Enforcers (Arn Anderson and Larry Zbyszko) (c)	Tag team match for the WCW World Tag Team Championship	14:48
7	Brian Pillman (c) defeated Johnny B. Badd (with Teddy Long)	Singles match for the WCW Light Heavyweight Championship	4:19
8	Rick Rude (with Paul E. Dangerously) defeated Sting (c)	Singles match for the WCW United States Heavyweight Championship	4:50
9	Lex Luger (c) (with Harley Race and Mr. Hughes) defeated Rick Steiner (with Scott Steiner)	Singles match for the WCW World Heavyweight Championship	11:30
(c) / – the champion(s) heading into the match

==== Clash of the Champions XVIII ====
Clash of the Champions XVIII
- Promotion: World Championship Wrestling
- Date: January 21, 1992
- City: Topeka, Kansas
- Venue: Kansas Expo Center
- Attendance: 5,500

Clash of the Champions chronology
← Previous; XVII	Next → XIX

Clash of the Champions XVIII took place on January 21, 1992, at the Kansas Expo Center in Topeka, Kansas. There were 5,500 fans in attendance and the show drew a 3.7 rating on TBS. This event was a set-up for SuperBrawl II and saw the WCW debut of Jesse Ventura. It was originally scheduled as Brian Pillman and The Patriots vs. Diamond Studd and The Young Pistols.

No.	Results	Stipulations	Times
1	The Steiner Brothers (Rick Steiner and Scott Steiner) defeated Big Van Vader and Mr. Hughes (with Harley Race)	Tag team match	9:02
2	Marcus Alexander Bagwell and Brian Pillman defeated Taylor Made Man and Tracy Smothers	Tag team match	7:49
3	Johnny B. Badd defeated Richard Morton	Singles match	3:20
4	P. N. News defeated Diamond Dallas Page	Singles match	3:25
5	Cactus Jack defeated Van Hammer	Falls Count Anywhere match	10:08
6	The Fabulous Freebirds (Jimmy Garvin and Michael Hayes) defeated Brad Armstrong and Big Josh	Tag team match	3:03
7	Vinnie Vegas defeated Thomas Rich	Singles match	0:56
8	Dustin Rhodes, Barry Windham and Ron Simmons defeated Dangerous Alliance (Arn Anderson, Bobby Eaton and Larry Zbyszko) (with Paul E. Dangerously)	Six-man tag team match	9:28
9	Sting and Ricky Steamboat defeated Steve Austin and Rick Rude	Tag team match	11:21

==== Clash of the Champions XIX ====
Clash of the Champions XIX
- Promotion: World Championship Wrestling
- Date: June 16, 1992 (aired June 22, 1992)
- City: Charleston, South Carolina
- Venue: McAlister Field House
- Attendance: 4,600

Clash of the Champions chronology
← Previous; XVIII	Next → XX

Clash of the Champions XIX took place on June 16, 1992, in Charleston, South Carolina, at the McAlister Field House of The Citadel. The event aired on TBS on June 22, 1992. There were 4,600 fans in attendance and the show drew a 2.8 rating on TBS. The popularity of this event, and the opening of the new 12,000-seat arena twelve miles to the north, led this to be the last Clash on-campus. Later Charleston-based Clashes were held at the new arena. The storyline was that Miguel Pérez Jr. and Ricky Santana were assaulted backstage, although it was never shown. The rest of the tournament took place at The Great American Bash 1992.

No.	Results	Stipulations	Times
1	Ricky Steamboat and Nikita Koloff (United States/Lithuania) defeated Joe Malenko and Dean Malenko (Hungary)	NWA World Tag Team Championship tournament first round match	9:50
2	Rick Rude and Steve Austin (with Madusa) (United States) defeated Marcus Alexander Bagwell and Tom Zenk (United States)	NWA World Tag Team Championship tournament first round match	7:54
3	Terry Gordy and Steve Williams (Japan) defeated Larry O'Day and Jeff O'Day (Australia)	NWA World Tag Team Championship tournament first round match	2:35
4	The Steiner Brothers (Rick and Scott) (United States) defeated Miguel Pérez Jr. and Ricky Santana (Puerto Rico) via forfeit	NWA World Tag Team Championship tournament first round match	—
5	Barry Windham and Dustin Rhodes (United States) defeated Arn Anderson and Bobby Eaton (United States)	NWA World Tag Team Championship tournament first round match	10:23
6	The Fabulous Freebirds (Jimmy Garvin and Michael Hayes) (United States) defeated The Silver Kings (Silver King I and Silver King II) (Mexico)	NWA World Tag Team Championship tournament first round match	6:28
7	Jushin Thunder Liger and Brian Pillman (Japan/United States) defeated Chris Benoit and Biff Wellington (Canada)	NWA World Tag Team Championship tournament first round match	11:30
8	Akira Nogami and Hiroshi Hase (Japan) defeated The Headhunters (masked Bob Cook and Joe Cruze) (Dominican Republic)	NWA World Tag Team Championship tournament first round match	5:19
9	Terry Gordy and Steve Williams defeated The Steiner Brothers (Rick Steiner and Scott Steiner)	NWA World Tag Team Championship tournament quarter finals	15:01

==== Clash of the Champions XX: 20th Anniversary ====
Clash of the Champions XX
- Promotion: World Championship Wrestling
- Date: September 2, 1992
- City: Atlanta, Georgia
- Venue: Center Stage Theater
- Attendance: 500

Clash of the Champions chronology
← Previous; XIX	Next → XXI

Clash of the Champions XX: 20th Anniversary was a professional wrestling supercard produced by World Championship Wrestling (WCW) and broadcast live on TBS on September 2, 1992, from the Center Stage Theater in Atlanta. The event was not only the 20th time WCW held a "Clash of the Champions" show but also marked the 20th anniversary of professional wrestling first being shown on TBS (as Mid-Atlantic Championship Wrestling) in 1972. The show was held at the Center Stage Theater, the same location where most episodes of WCW's regular TBS show WCW Saturday Night were taped at the time. It was also the final wrestling TV appearance for André the Giant, who died four months later. Other wrestling legends, including "Bullet" Bob Armstrong and Thunderbolt Patterson, also appeared at the event.

The commentators for the event were Jim Ross and Jesse Ventura. Cactus Jack provided guest commentary for the tag team bout between The Barbarian and Butch Reed and Barry Windham and Dustin Rhodes

During the WCW World Heavyweight Championship match between Ron Simmons and Cactus Jack, Jack suffered a torn abdominal muscle upon executing his diving elbow drop from the ring apron to the concrete floor. Jack - known for his pain tolerance - described it as the most painful injury he had ever suffered. He did not return to the ring for several weeks, instead acting as The Barbarian's manager.

No.	Results	Stipulations	Times
1	Ricky Steamboat defeated Steve Austin (c) (with Paul E. Dangerously)	No Disqualification match for the WCW World Television Championship	10:43
2	Arn Anderson and Bobby Eaton (with Michael Hayes) defeated Dick Slater and Greg Valentine (with Larry Zbyszko)	Tag team match	5:42
3	Ron Simmons (c) defeated Cactus Jack	Singles match for the WCW World Heavyweight Championship, with Ole Anderson as special guest referee	8:51
4	The Barbarian and Butch Reed defeated Barry Windham and Dustin Rhodes	Tag team match	8:13
5	Rick Rude, Jake "The Snake" Roberts, Super Invader and Big Van Vader (with Harley Race) defeated Sting, Nikita Koloff and the Steiner Brothers (Rick Steiner and Scott Steiner)	Elimination match	15:57
(c) / – the champion(s) heading into the match

==== Clash of the Champions XXI ====
Clash of the Champions XXI
- Promotion: World Championship Wrestling
- Date: November 18, 1992
- City: Macon, Georgia
- Venue: Macon Coliseum
- Attendance: 7,500

Clash of the Champions chronology
← Previous; XX	Next → XXII

Clash of the Champions XXI took place on November 18, 1992, from Macon, Georgia, at the Macon Coliseum.

Brian Pillman pinned Brad Armstrong after attacking him pre-match while feigning injury. Scotty Flamingo knocked out Johnny B. Badd in the second round after hitting him with a glove Page and Vegas filled with water during the rest period. This was 2 Cold Scorpio's debut in WCW. Simmons' original partner Robbie Walker was injured. This was Paul E. Dangerously's last appearance on WCW television, moving on to Eastern Championship Wrestling (precursor to Extreme Championship Wrestling in 1993. The ringside judges were Ole Anderson, Larry Zbyszko, and Hiro Matsuda; Anderson and Matsuda voted for Sting while Zbyszko voted for Rude. Rude's WCW United States Heavyweight Championship was not on the line in the match. After their match Barry Windham berated Dustin Rhodes for not going finishing off an injured Ricky Steamboat during the match. Windham then turned on Rhodes and hit him with his new finisher, the Implant DDT. Windham then went backstage, attacking Steamboat and Shane Douglas with a steel chair while they were being interviewed by Jesse "The Body" Ventura.

No.	Results	Stipulations	Times
1	Brian Pillman defeated Brad Armstrong	Singles match	0:25
2	Erik Watts and Kensuke Sasaki defeated Arn Anderson and Bobby Eaton (with Michael Hayes)	Tag team match	6:06
3	Scotty Flamingo (with Diamond Dallas Page and Vinnie Vegas) defeated Johnny B. Badd (with Teddy Long)	Boxing match	3:01
4	Ron Simmons and 2 Cold Scorpio defeated Tony Atlas, The Barbarian and Cactus Jack	Handicap match	5:52
5	Madusa vs. Paul E. Dangerously (with Michael Hayes) ended in a time-limit draw	Singles match	5:00
6	Sting defeated Rick Rude	Singles match	20:00
7	Shane Douglas and Ricky Steamboat defeated Barry Windham and Dustin Rhodes (c)	Tag team match for the NWA and WCW World Tag Team Championships	15:52
(c) / – the champion(s) heading into the match

==== Clash of the Champions XXII ====
Clash of the Champions XXII
- Promotion: World Championship Wrestling
- Date: January 13, 1993
- City: Milwaukee, Wisconsin
- Venue: The MECCA
- Attendance: 4,000

Clash of the Champions chronology
← Previous; XXI	Next → XXIII

Clash of the Champions XXII took place on January 13, 1993, in Milwaukee, Wisconsin, at The MECCA. This was the last Clash for announcer Jim Ross who shortly after this event left WCW and joined the WWF.

Originally, it was scheduled to be Sting, Dustin Rhodes, Ron Simmons, and Van Hammer against Big Van Vader, Barry Windham, The Barbarian, and Rick Rude; due to injuries, Hammer and Rude dropped out and Orndorff took Rude's place. Earlier on the show, Vader's team got rid of Barbarian, and Vader injured Simmons. Cactus Jack came in during the match, siding with Sting and Rhodes, thus turning face. Johnny B. Badd replaced Erik Watts, where the storyline was that he was suspended from WCW, due to an altercation with Arn Anderson. Tony Atlas replaced Hammer in the arm-wrestling contest.

No.	Results	Stipulations	Times
1	Cactus Jack defeated Johnny B. Badd	Singles match	2:50
2	2 Cold Scorpio defeated Scotty Flamingo	Singles match	4:13
3	Chris Benoit defeated Brad Armstrong	Singles match	9:13
4	Vinnie Vegas defeated Tony Atlas	Arm Wrestling match	1:09
5	The Wrecking Crew (Rage and Fury) defeated Johnny Gunn and Tom Zenk	Tag team match	6:06
6	Shane Douglas and Ricky Steamboat (c) defeated Brian Pillman and Steve Austin	Tag team match for the NWA and WCW World Tag Team Championships	13:39
7	Dustin Rhodes, Sting and Cactus Jack defeated Big Van Vader, Barry Windham and Paul Orndorff	Thundercage match	11:22
(c) / – the champion(s) heading into the match

==== Clash of the Champions XXIII ====
Clash of the Champions XXIII
- Promotion: World Championship Wrestling
- Date: June 16, 1993
- City: Norfolk, Virginia
- Venue: Norfolk Scope
- Attendance: 6,000

Clash of the Champions chronology
← Previous; XXII	Next → XXIV

Clash of the Champions XXIII took place on June 16, 1993, in Norfolk, Virginia, from the Norfolk Scope.

Dick Slater replaced WCW World Television champion Paul Orndorff, who was injured in a car accident. Earlier, Maxx Payne shot Johnny B. Badd in the face with his Baddblaster. Flair pinned Pillman (9:41), The Blonds were disqualified (11:06). Although they won two straight falls, Anderson and Flair did not win the titles because the interference by Barry Windham caused the Hollywood Blonds to get disqualified in the second fall, thus the titles could not change hands. A dark match saw Jim Neidhart defeat Shanghai Pierce.

No.	Results	Stipulations	Times
1	Ron Simmons defeated Dick Slater (with Paul Orndorff)	Singles match	3:56
2	Lord Steven Regal (with Sir William) defeated Marcus Alexander Bagwell	Singles match	6:18
3	Barry Windham (c) defeated 2 Cold Scorpio	Singles match for the NWA World Heavyweight Championship	12:53
4	Big Van Vader, Sid Vicious and Rick Rude (with Col. Robert Parker and Harley Race) defeated Dustin Rhodes, Sting and Davey Boy Smith	Six-man tag team match	10:59
5	Ric Flair and Arn Anderson defeated The Hollywood Blonds (Brian Pillman and Steve Austin) (c) 2-0 by disqualification	Two-out-of-three falls match for the NWA and WCW World Tag Team Championships	20:45
(c) / – the champion(s) heading into the match

==== Clash of the Champions XXIV ====
Clash of the Champions XXIV
- Promotion: World Championship Wrestling
- Date: August 18, 1993
- City: Daytona Beach, Florida
- Venue: Ocean Center
- Attendance: 8,903

Clash of the Champions chronology
← Previous; XXIII	Next → XXV

Clash of the Champions XXIV took place on August 18, 1993, in Daytona Beach, Florida, from the Ocean Center.

Lord Steven Regal replaced the injured Brian Pillman. On September 1, Anderson and Roma would be stripped of the NWA World Tag Team Championship, due to WCW withdrawing from the NWA. Bobby Eaton replaced Regal, who replaced Pillman in the earlier match. If Vader had been disqualified in the main event, he would have lost the title to Smith. Cactus Jack returned after the main event match, attacking Vader. The Shockmaster made his WCW debut in one of the most infamous moments in wrestling history.

No.	Results	Stipulations	Times
1	Arn Anderson and Paul Roma defeated Steve Austin and Lord Steven Regal (c) (with Brian Pillman and Sir William)	Tag team match for the NWA and WCW World Tag Team Championships	9:52
2	2 Cold Scorpio defeated Bobby Eaton	Singles match	5:26
3	Johnny B. Badd defeated Maxx Payne	Mask vs. Guitar match	2:41
4	Ricky Steamboat defeated Paul Orndorff (c)	Singles match for the WCW World Television Championship	8:31
5	Sting and Ric Flair defeated the Colossal Kongs (Awesome Kong and King Kong) (with Harley Race)	Tag team match	2:14
6	Road Warrior Hawk and Dustin Rhodes (with Road Warrior Animal) defeated The Equalizer and Rick Rude	Tag team match	7:41
7	Big Van Vader (c) (with Harley Race) defeated Davey Boy Smith	Singles match for the WCW World Heavyweight Championship; Had Big Van Vader been disqualified, he would have lost the title.	11:11
(c) / – the champion(s) heading into the match

==== Clash of the Champions XXV ====
Clash of the Champions XXV
- Promotion: World Championship Wrestling
- Date: November 10, 1993
- City: St. Petersburg, Florida
- Venue: Bayfront Arena
- Attendance: 6,000

Clash of the Champions chronology
← Previous; XXIV	Next → XXVI

Clash of the Champions XXV took place on November 10, 1993, in St. Petersburg, Florida, from the Bayfront Arena.

Ric Flair pinned Big Van Vader but the referee later reversed the decision to a disqualification victory for Flair as Vader had accidentally knocked down the referee. As a result, Vader retained the championship.

No.	Results	Stipulations	Times
1	Rick Rude (c) vs. Road Warrior Hawk ended in a double countout	Singles match for the WCW International World Heavyweight Championship	5:23
2	The Shockmaster defeated The Equalizer	Singles match	2:29
3	Lord Steven Regal (c) (with Sir William) defeated Johnny B. Badd	Singles match for the WCW World Television Championship	6:33
4	Steve Austin (with Col. Robert Parker) defeated Brian Pillman	Singles match	9:12
5	Dustin Rhodes (c) defeated Paul Orndorff (with The Assassin)	Singles match for the WCW United States Heavyweight Championship	11:57
6	The Nasty Boys (Jerry Sags and Brian Knobs) (c) (with Missy Hyatt) defeated Sting and Davey Boy Smith	Tag team match for the WCW World Tag Team Championship	8:30
7	Ric Flair defeated Vader (c) (with Harley Race) by disqualification.	Singles match for the WCW World Heavyweight Championship	9:24
(c) / – the champion(s) heading into the match

==== Clash of the Champions XXVI ====
Clash of the Champions XXVI
- Promotion: World Championship Wrestling
- Date: January 27, 1994
- City: Baton Rouge, Louisiana
- Venue: Riverside Centroplex
- Attendance: 3,200

Clash of the Champions chronology
← Previous; XXV	Next → XXVII

Clash of the Champions XXVI took place on January 27, 1994, in Baton Rouge, Louisiana, from the Riverside Centroplex.

This event saw the debut of Bobby "The Brain" Heenan in WCW and Nick Bockwinkel debuted as the on camera WCW commissioner.

No.	Results	Stipulations	Times
1	Marcus Alexander Bagwell and 2 Cold Scorpio (with Teddy Long) defeated Pretty Wonderful (Paul Roma and Paul Orndorff) (with The Assassin)	Tag team match	12:39
2	Ron Simmons defeated Ice Train	Singles match	3:32
3	Lord Steven Regal (c) (with Sir William) vs. Dustin Rhodes ended in a time limit draw	Singles match for the WCW World Television Championship	15:00
4	Cactus Jack and Maxx Payne defeated The Nasty Boys (Jerry Sags and Brian Knobs) (with Missy Hyatt)	Tag team match	6:46
5	Brian Pillman defeated Col. Robert Parker (with Steve Austin)	Loser Wears a Chicken Suit match	5:41
6	Sting and Ric Flair defeated Vader and Rick Rude (with Harley Race)	Tag team match	22:07
(c) / – the champion(s) heading into the match

==== Clash of the Champions XXVII ====
Clash of the Champions XXVII
- Promotion: World Championship Wrestling
- Date: June 23, 1994
- City: North Charleston, South Carolina
- Venue: North Charleston Coliseum
- Attendance: 6,700

Clash of the Champions chronology
← Previous; XXVI	Next → XXVIII

Clash of the Champions XXVII took place on June 23, 1994, in North Charleston, South Carolina, from the North Charleston Coliseum.

WCW World Heavyweight Championship Ric Flair won the WCW International World Heavyweight Championship, unifying it with his own title. After this the unified championship was represented by the Big Gold Belt.

No.	Results	Stipulations	Times
1	Cactus Jack and Kevin Sullivan (c) (with Dave Sullivan) defeated The Nasty Boys (Jerry Sags and Brian Knobs)	Tag team match for the WCW World Tag Team Championship	10:35
2	The Guardian Angel defeated Tex Slazenger	Singles match	1:44
3	Lord Steven Regal (with Sir William) defeated Larry Zbyszko (c)	Singles match for the WCW World Television Championship	9:25
4	Johnny B. Badd defeated Steve Austin (c) by disqualification.	Singles match for the WCW United States Heavyweight Championship	10:25
5	Ric Flair (WCW) defeated Sting (WCW International)	Unification match for the WCW and the WCW International World Heavyweight Championships	17:17
(c) / – the champion(s) heading into the match

==== Clash of the Champions XXVIII ====
Clash of the Champions XXVIII
- Promotion: World Championship Wrestling
- Date: August 24, 1994
- City: Cedar Rapids, Iowa
- Venue: Five Seasons Center
- Attendance: 4,200

Clash of the Champions chronology
← Previous; XXVII	Next → XXIX

Clash of the Champions XXVIII took place on August 24, 1994, in Cedar Rapids, Iowa, from the Five Seasons Center.

Early on the show, Hulk Hogan was attacked by a masked man (played by Arn Anderson, though in the storyline the assassin was eventually revealed as Brother Bruti). Steamboat suffered a career-ending back injury during his match. He would however make a brief in ring return for the WWE in 2009.

No.	Results	Stipulations	Times
1	The Nasty Boys (Jerry Sags and Brian Knobs) defeated Pretty Wonderful (Paul Roma and Paul Orndorff)	Tag team match	9:33
2	Ricky Steamboat defeated Steve Austin (c)	Singles match for the WCW United States Heavyweight Championship	16:02
3	Dusty Rhodes and Dustin Rhodes defeated Terry Funk and Bunkhouse Buck (with Col. Robert Parker) by disqualification	Tag team match	7:27
4	Antonio Inoki defeated Lord Steven Regal (with Sir William)	Singles match	8:26
5	Ric Flair (with Sensuous Sherri) defeated Hulk Hogan (c) (with Jimmy Hart and Brother Bruti) by countout	Singles match for the WCW World Heavyweight Championship	14:26
(c) / – the champion(s) heading into the match

==== Clash of the Champions XXIX ====
Clash of the Champions XXIX
- Promotion: World Championship Wrestling
- Date: November 16, 1994
- City: Jacksonville, Florida
- Venue: Jacksonville Memorial Coliseum
- Attendance: 4,000

Clash of the Champions chronology
← Previous; XXVIII	Next → XXX

Clash of the Champions XXIX took place on November 16, 1994, in Jacksonville, Florida, from the Jacksonville Memorial Coliseum.

No.	Results	Stipulations	Times
1	Stars and Stripes (The Patriot and Marcus Alexander Bagwell) defeated Pretty Wonderful (Paul Roma and Paul Orndorff) (c)	Tag team match for the WCW World Tag Team Championship	9:20
2	Johnny B. Badd (c) defeated The Honky Tonk Man by disqualification	Singles match for the WCW World Television Championship	6:10
3	Harlem Heat (Booker T and Stevie Ray) defeated The Nasty Boys (Jerry Sags and Brian Knobs)	Tag team match	10:36
4	Vader (with Harley Race) defeated Dustin Rhodes	Singles match	11:43
5	Jim Duggan (c) defeated Steve Austin by disqualification	Singles match for the WCW United States Heavyweight Championship	0:54
6	Hulk Hogan, Sting and Dave Sullivan (with Jimmy Hart) defeated The Three Faces of Fear (The Butcher, Avalanche and Kevin Sullivan)	Six-man tag team match with Mr. T as special guest referee	10:55
(c) / – the champion(s) heading into the match

==== Clash of the Champions XXX ====
Clash of the Champions XXX
- Promotion: World Championship Wrestling
- Date: January 25, 1995
- City: Paradise, Nevada
- Venue: Caesars Palace
- Attendance: 3,500

Clash of the Champions chronology
← Previous; XXIX	Next → XXXI

Clash of the Champions XXX took place on January 25, 1995, in Paradise, Nevada, from Caesars Palace.

No.	Results	Stipulations	Times
1	Arn Anderson (c) defeated Johnny B. Badd	Singles match for the WCW World Television Championship	7:38
2	Alex Wright defeated Bobby Eaton	Singles match	7:38
3	Harlem Heat (Booker T and Stevie Ray) (c) (with Sister Sherri) defeated Stars and Stripes (Marcus Alexander Bagwell and The Patriot)	Tag team match for the WCW World Tag Team Championship	9:45
4	Sting defeated Avalanche by submission	Singles match with The Guardian Angel as special guest referee	5:22
5	Hulk Hogan and Randy Savage (with Jimmy Hart) defeated Kevin Sullivan and The Butcher	Tag team match	11:04
(c) / – the champion(s) heading into the match

==== Clash of the Champions XXXI ====
Clash of the Champions XXXI
- Promotion: World Championship Wrestling
- Date: August 6, 1995
- City: Daytona Beach, Florida
- Venue: Ocean Center
- Attendance: 4,039

Clash of the Champions chronology
← Previous; XXX	Next → XXXII

Clash of the Champions XXXI took place August 6, 1995, in Daytona Beach, Florida, from the Ocean Center.

If Harlem Heat and Sister Sherri won, they get a WCW World Tag Team Championship match against Bunkhouse Buck and Dick Slater at Fall Brawl. After losing to Vader, Arn Anderson and Ric Flair teased an eventual breakup and set up their match at Fall Brawl.

No.	Results	Stipulations	Times
1	Sting and Road Warrior Hawk defeated Meng and Kurasawa (with Col. Robert Parker)	Tag team match	7:23
2	Diamond Dallas Page (with The Diamond Doll) defeated Alex Wright	Singles match	8:14
3	The Renegade (c) (with Jimmy Hart) defeated Paul Orndorff	Singles match for the WCW World Television Championship	3:59
4	Harlem Heat (Booker T and Stevie Ray) and Sister Sherri defeated Bunkhouse Buck, Dick Slater and Col. Robert Parker	Six-man tag team match	11:01
5	Vader defeated Arn Anderson and Ric Flair	Handicap match	8:05
(c) / – the champion(s) heading into the match

==== Clash of the Champions XXXII ====
Clash of the Champions XXXII
- Promotion: World Championship Wrestling
- Date: January 23, 1996
- City: Paradise, Nevada
- Venue: Caesars Palace
- Attendance: 3,100

Clash of the Champions chronology
← Previous; XXXI	Next → XXXIII

Clash of the Champions XXXII took place on January 23, 1996, in Paradise, Nevada, from Caesars Palace.

Lord Steven Regal injured his knee during the opening dark match against Chris Benoit. Benoit bled from the eye after receiving several headbutts. The show included the wedding of Col. Robert Parker and Sister Sherri, which was interrupted by Madusa, who was revealed to have been seeing Parker on the side. Brian Pillman, during his match with Eddie Guerrero, grabbed ringside commentator Bobby Heenan's jacket collar from behind, causing Heenan to yell "What the fuck are you doing?" Heenan later apologized for his outburst. Disco Inferno forfeited his match to perform at Parker & Sherri's wedding. This was revealed by an Elvis Impersonator (Mike Winner) who Sullivan attacked. The Road Warriors returned at this event and challenged WCW Tag Team Champions Sting and Lex Luger, with Sting agreeing to a match despite Luger being reluctant. Miss Elizabeth, Debra McMichael, Linda Bollea, Woman, and several other women initially came to the ring with Hogan and Savage. It was reported that Ric Flair, who lost the WCW World Heavyweight Championship to Savage one day prior, threatened to quit WCW unless the finish to the main event (Hogan pinning Flair following a leg drop) was changed. At the event, Flair pinned Savage after use of a foreign object. Live reports claim 75% of the crowd left during the dark match that closed the show.

No.	Results	Stipulations	Times
1^{D}	Lord Steven Regal defeated Chris Benoit	Singles match	6:40
2	The Public Enemy (Johnny Grunge and Rocco Rock) vs. The Nasty Boys (Brian Knobbs and Jerry Sags) ended in a double disqualification	Tag team match	4:02
3	Dean Malenko defeated Alex Wright	Singles match	5:31
4	Brian Pillman defeated Eddie Guerrero	Singles match	5:50
5	Sting and Lex Luger (c) defeated The Blue Bloods (Lord Steven Regal and Robert Eaton)	Tag team match for the WCW World Tag Team Championship	7:46
6	Konnan defeated Psychosis by submission	Singles match	5:26
7	Ric Flair and The Giant (with Jimmy Hart) defeated Hulk Hogan and Randy Savage (with Miss Elizabeth and Kevin Greene)	Tag team match	9:51
8^{D}	One Man Gang (c) (with Jimmy Hart) defeated Disco Inferno	Singles match for the WCW United States Heavyweight Championship	6:16
(c) / – the champion(s) heading into the match; D / – this was a dark match

==== Clash of the Champions XXXIII ====
Clash of the Champions XXXIII
- Promotion: World Championship Wrestling
- Date: August 15, 1996
- City: Denver, Colorado
- Venue: Denver Coliseum
- Attendance: 8,304

Clash of the Champions chronology
← Previous; XXXII	Next → XXXIV

Clash of the Champions XXXIII took place on August 15, 1996, in Denver, Colorado, from the Denver Coliseum.

Ric Flair was the WCW United States Heavyweight Champion at the time, making the match champion vs. champion, but his title was not on the line.

No.	Results	Stipulations	Times
1	Rey Misterio Jr. (c) defeated Dean Malenko	Singles match for the WCW Cruiserweight Championship	12:07
2	V.K. Wallstreet defeated Jim Duggan	Singles match	3:48
3	Konnan defeated Ultimate Dragon (with Sonny Onoo)	Singles match	2:57
4	Madusa defeated Bull Nakano (with Sonny Onoo)	Singles match	2:42
5	Eddie Guerrero defeated Diamond Dallas Page	Singles match	4:20
6	The Giant (with Jimmy Hart) defeated Chris Benoit (with Woman and Miss Elizabeth)	Singles match	0:23
7	Harlem Heat (Booker T and Stevie Ray) (c) (with Sister Sherri and Col. Robert Parker) vs. The Steiner Brothers (Rick Steiner and Scott Steiner) and Sting and Lex Luger ended in a no contest	Triple threat match for the WCW World Tag Team Championship	13:22
8	Ric Flair (with Woman and Miss Elizabeth) defeated Hollywood Hogan (c) by disqualification	Singles match for the WCW World Heavyweight Championship	8:23
(c) / – the champion(s) heading into the match

==== Clash of the Champions XXXIV ====
Clash of the Champions XXXIV
- Promotion: World Championship Wrestling
- Date: January 21, 1997
- City: Milwaukee, Wisconsin
- Venue: Wisconsin Center Arena
- Attendance: 6,800

Clash of the Champions chronology
← Previous; XXXIII	Next → XXXV

Clash of the Champions XXXIV took place on January 21, 1997, in Milwaukee, Wisconsin, from the Wisconsin Center Arena. Chris Jericho replaced Juventud Guerrera, who no-showed, while La Parka replaced Psychosis, who was injured.

No.	Results	Stipulations	Times
1	Dean Malenko defeated Ultimate Dragon (c) (with Sonny Onoo) by submission	Singles match for the WCW Cruiserweight Championship	15:07
2	Scotty Riggs defeated Mike Enos	Singles match	2:26
3	Chris Jericho, Super Caló and Chavo Guerrero Jr. defeated Konnan, La Parka and Mr. JL	Six-man tag team match	5:27
4	Harlem Heat (Booker T and Stevie Ray) (with Sister Sherri) defeated The Renegade and Joe Gomez	Tag team match	3:44
5	Masahiro Chono defeated Alex Wright	Singles match	4:30
6	Eddie Guerrero defeated Scott Norton	Singles match	5:36
7	Chris Benoit (with Woman) defeated The Taskmaster (with Jimmy Hart)	Falls Count Anywhere match	5:04
8	The Steiner Brothers (Rick Steiner and Scott Steiner) defeated The Amazing French-Canadians (Jacques Rougeau and Carl Ouelett) (with Col. Robert Parker)	Tag team match	6:55
9	Lex Luger defeated Scott Hall (with Kevin Nash and Syxx) by disqualification	Singles match	10:29
(c) / – the champion(s) heading into the match

==== Clash of the Champions XXXV ====
Clash of the Champions XXXV
- Promotion: World Championship Wrestling
- Date: August 21, 1997
- City: Nashville, Tennessee
- Venue: Nashville Municipal Auditorium
- Attendance: 4,122

Clash of the Champions chronology
← Previous; XXXIV	Next → NXT Clash of the Champions

Clash of the Champions XXXV took place on August 21, 1997, in Nashville, Tennessee, from the Nashville Municipal Auditorium.

The main event was originally announced as a standard tag match, but was changed to a match for Hall and Kevin Nash's tag team titles before it began, with Randy Savage subbing for Nash under the Freebird rule.

No.	Results	Stipulations	Times
1	Steve McMichael defeated Jeff Jarrett (c) (with Queen Debra)	Singles match for the WCW United States Heavyweight Championship	8:07
2	Raven defeated Stevie Richards	No Disqualification match	5:01
3	Alex Wright defeated Último Dragón (c)	Singles match for the WCW World Television Championship	13:55
4	Chris Jericho (c) defeated Eddie Guerrero	Singles match for the WCW Cruiserweight Championship	6:41
5	Psychosis, Silver King, Villano IV and Villano V (with Sonny Onoo) defeated Juventud Guerrera, Super Caló, Héctor Garza and Lizmark Jr.	Eight-man tag team match	4:52
6	Ric Flair and Curt Hennig defeated Konnan and Syxx	Tag team match	5:09
7	Scott Hall and Randy Savage (c) (with Miss Elizabeth) defeated Diamond Dallas Page and Lex Luger	Tag team match for the WCW World Tag Team Championship	9:55
(c) / – the champion(s) heading into the match

=== WWE ===
==== NXT Clash of the Champions ====
NXT Clash of the Champions
- Promotion: WWE
- Brand: NXT
- Date: March 21, 2013 (aired April 24, 2013)
- City: Winter Park, Florida
- Venue: Full Sail University

Clash of the Champions chronology
← Previous; XXXV	Next → Final

NXT Clash of the Champions took place on March 21, 2013, in Winter Park, Florida, from Full Sail University, and aired on April 24, 2013 on Hulu. It was the sole event produced by WWE under the Clash of the Champions name. The main event saw Wade Barrett defend the WWE Intercontinental Championship against Bo Dallas.

No.	Results	Stipulations	Times
1	Antonio Cesaro (c) defeated Adrian Neville	Singles match for the WWE United States Championship	10:34
2	Kaitlyn (c) defeated AJ Lee	Singles match for the WWE Divas Championship	5:06
3	Big E Langston (c) defeated Brad Maddox	Singles match for the NXT Championship	1:17
4	Wade Barrett (c) defeated Bo Dallas	Singles match for the WWE Intercontinental Championship	11:40
(c) / – the champion(s) heading into the match

== See also ==
- List of All Elite Wrestling pay-per-view events
- List of ECW supercards and pay-per-view events
- List of FMW supercards and pay-per-view events
- List of Global Force Wrestling events and specials
- List of Major League Wrestling events
- List of National Wrestling Alliance pay-per-view events
- List of NJPW pay-per-view events
- List of NWA pay-per-view events
- List of Ring of Honor pay-per-view events
- List of Smokey Mountain Wrestling supercard events
- List of WWA pay-per-view events
- List of World Class Championship Wrestling Supercard events
- List of WWE pay-per-view and WWE Network events
- List of WWE Saturday Night Main Event shows
- List of WWE Tribute to the Troops shows
