= Varsity Club =

Professional wrestling stable

- The Varsity Club - Kevin Sullivan (front), Mike Rotunda (back), and Rick Steiner (right) - being interviewed by David Crockett (left), c. 1988

Stable
- Members: Kevin Sullivan; Mike Rotunda; Rick Steiner; Steve Williams; Dan Spivey; Leia Meow (valet)
- Debut: 1987, 1999
- Disbanded: 1989, 2004

The Varsity Club was a professional wrestling heel stable in Jim Crockett Promotions and World Championship Wrestling (WCW). The stable was formed in 1987 and lasted until 1989. The stable was resurrected in 1999–2004.

== History ==
=== Original run ===
The Varsity Club formed in the NWA's Jim Crockett Promotions by Kevin Sullivan after he recruited Rick Steiner who was of University of Michigan's and Syracuse University's Mike Rotunda in early 1988. The group would wear the letterman jackets of their respective alma maters and brag about their superiority to other wrestlers on the roster because of their amateur wrestling background. In Rotunda and Steiner's case their claims were legitimate, as they both wrestled in college, while Sullivan's claims were more a matter of Kayfabe. Rotunda was the Florida Champion, but when he defeated Nikita Koloff (with Kevin Sullivan's help) to win the NWA World Television Championship, he gave the Florida title to Steiner. The team seemed cohesive initially under Sullivan's leadership, but began to experience dissension as Rotunda and Steiner bickered over who was the “Captain” of the team. In February 1988, the Club started a feud with Jimmy Garvin because Sullivan wanted Garvin's valet Precious. Sullivan would stalk Precious and taunt her with papers in his robe, but it was never revealed why he was stalking her or what the papers were about. Garvin got help from his "brother" ”Rugged” Ron Garvin and "Dr. Death" Steve Williams in his fight with the club. At Clash of the Champions I Rotunda defeated Jimmy Garvin in a “College Rules” match. Three months later Garvin got revenge as he and Ron defeated Rotunda and Steiner at Clash of the Champions II. The fact that it was Steiner who lost the match was further cause for friction in the club. Sullivan and Rotunda started to punish the “slow witted” Steiner (in character) and taunted him mercilessly. At The Great American Bash 1988 the Garvins/Varsity Club feud came to a violent clash as the Garvins teamed with the Road Warriors and Steve Williams to beat Sullivan, Rotunda, Al Perez, The Russian Assassin and Ivan Koloff in a Tower of Doom Match. In September 1988 the Club attacked Jimmy Garvin; Sullivan used a cinder block to “break” Garvin's leg, effectively ending the feud. Steiner began a slow face turn when he tried to save Sting from a beatdown by The Road Warriors, who turned on him after a match against the club.

Steiner finally reached his breaking point near the end of 1988, when he attacked Rotunda, turning face as a sympathetic underdog. At Starrcade 1988 he received a match with Rotunda for the TV title. Despite being locked in a cage at ringside, Sullivan had an ace up his sleeve. The ace was former opponent Steve Williams, a University of Oklahoma alumnus who had just joined the Varsity Club. Though Williams was unable to prevent Steiner from winning the TV title, his arrival signified a major recruiting coup for Sullivan. Earlier in the night, Sullivan and Williams brought gold back to the stable when they defeated the Fantastics for the United States Tag-Team titles. Steiner's run with the TV title ended a few months later as Rotunda regained the belt at the Chi-Town Rumble on February 20, 1989. He did get impressive backup from his brother Scott, a recent arrival who was eager to help. Though Scott's role was initially limited to moral support, he and Rick would later go on to become one of the most accomplished tag team in the promotion's history. The Steiners celebrated when Rick and "Hot Stuff" Eddie Gilbert won the US Tag-Team titles from Williams and Sullivan on February 28.

In early 1989, the group added University of Georgia alumnus Dan Spivey to their ranks in an effort to dominate the promotion. This was an attempt to fill a power vacuum created by the disbanding of The Four Horsemen. The effort got off to a rocky start when Rotunda lost the TV Title to Sting. on March 31, 1989.

Throughout the spring of 1989, the club made several attempts to dethrone reigning NWA World Tag Team Champions the Road Warriors, including Sullivan and Williams' match with them at the Chi-Town Rumble. On April 2, 1989 at Clash of the Champions VI the combination of Williams and Rotunda were able to defeat the Warriors, thanks to a fast count by referee Teddy Long., who had been bribed by Sullivan. The duo managed to keep the titles through Sullivan's outside interference and frequent disqualifications, including at their title defense at WrestleWar 1989. However, due to the controversial way the Club won and defended the titles, they were stripped of the gold that night.

The club was unable to regain the US Tag titles from Rick Steiner and Eddie Gilbert, although they did force Gilbert to leave the promotion for a short time. Gilbert's departure provided the impetus for Rick to team with his brother Scott, a pairing that would go on to become very successful in the coming years. Shortly after WrestleWar 1989, the club began to disintegrate with the departures of Williams and later Spivey, who started to work with Sid Vicious as one of The Skyscrapers. This left Sullivan and Rotunda as the sole Varsity Club members, meaning the stable was effectively finished. The Steiner Brothers made their team debut at the Great American Bash 1989, beating Sullivan and Rotunda in a Texas Tornado Match. The last official appearance of the Club occurred when former member Williams defeated Rotunda at Clash of the Champions VIII.

=== Legacy ===
Rotunda would later turn face in 1990, becoming "Captain Mike Rotunda," and he would form a crew with Abdullah the Butcher and Norman the Lunatic to feud with a group formed by former Varsity Club teammate Kevin Sullivan, known as "Sullivan's Slaughterhouse," composed of Cactus Jack, Buzz Sawyer, and Bam Bam Bigelow, with barely any mention being made of Rotunda's and Sullivan's past association during the feud. Rotunda and Steiner would later feud during the first eight months of 1993 in the World Wrestling Federation, with Rotunda now playing a tax man named Irwin R. Schyster, who teamed with Ted DiBiase to form Money Incorporated. Money Inc. had been WWF Tag Champions for fourteen out of sixteen months since February 1992 and would trade the WWF Tag Team Championship titles with Rick and his brother, Scott Steiner, three times in ten days during June 1993.

=== Varsity Club 2000 ===
The Varsity Club had a brief reformation in World Championship Wrestling in 1999 when Sullivan, Rotunda and Steiner teamed together at Starrcade on December 19, 1999. The three men were ”Hacksaw” Jim Duggan’s surprise partners, showing up in their old letterman jackets and accompanied by a cheerleader, Leia Meow; they made her do pushups and bounce on a trampoline at ringside. The Club turned on Duggan at the end of the match, leaving him easy prey for The Revolution. The Club disbanded in late January 2000 after a brief feud with Don and Ron Harris.

In September 2000, Williams and Rotunda reformed their team, under the name Varsity Club 2000, in All Japan Pro Wrestling. Williams had been a regular in AJPW since the original stable's break up and Rotunda started touring after leaving WCW. Despite winning the promotion's annual World's Strongest Tag Determination League tournament in December, they were never able to enjoy much success due to Rotunda's injuries and the phasing out of foreign talent left from the All Japan promotional system before the Pro Wrestling Noah split.

Varsity Club 2000 team would continue to perform throughout the early 2000s in AJPW and IWA Japan, taking part as an upper-midcard tag-team fighting against the likes of Keiji Muto, Genichiro Tenryu, Mike Barton and Jim Steele, George Hines and Johnny Smith. The team would end because Steve Williams announced he had throat cancer on live TV in March 2004, needing to get surgery and was out of action for most of 2004. Mike Rotunda, not having a tag partner and as well as mounting injuries, retired in May 2004 having his own retirement show.

== Championships and accomplishments ==
- All Japan Pro Wrestling
  - World's Strongest Tag Determination League (2000) – Rotunda and Williams
- World Championship Wrestling
  - NWA World Television Championship (2 times) – Rotunda
  - NWA United States Tag Team Championship (1 time) – Sullivan and Williams
  - NWA Florida Heavyweight Championship (2 times) – Steiner (1) and Rotunda (1)
  - NWA World Tag Team Championship (Mid-Atlantic version) (1 time) – Rotunda and Williams

== See also ==
- The Skyscrapers
- The Three Faces of Fear
- The U.S. Express
- The York Foundation
