= Southern Boys =

Professional wrestling tag team

Tag team
- Name(s): Southern Boys; Wild-Eyed Southern Boys; Young Pistols
- Members: Steve Armstrong; Tracy Smothers
- Billed heights: Steve Armstrong: 6 ft 1 in (1.85 m); Tracy Smothers: 6 ft 1 in (1.85 m)
- Combined billed weight: 459 lb (208 kg)
- Billed from: "The Heartlands of the South" (as the Southern Boys); Cheyenne, Wyoming, United States (as the Young Pistols)
- Debut: 1987
- Disbanded: 1992

The Southern Boys - also known as the Wild-Eyed Southern Boys and the Young Pistols - were a professional wrestling tag team active between 1987 and 1991 in Championship Wrestling from Florida, Southeastern Championship Wrestling, and World Championship Wrestling. The tag team was composed of Steve Armstrong and Tracy Smothers.

== History ==
=== Championship Wrestling from Florida (1987) ===
Steve Armstrong and Tracy Smothers started teaming as the "Wild-Eyed Southern Boys" and then simply the "Southern Boys" in Championship Wrestling from Florida in 1987. Their first match came on February 17 in Tampa, Florida, where they lost to The New Breed. However four days later the Southern Boys defeated The New Breed to gain their first ever championship, the NWA Florida Tag Team Championship. Smothers and Armstrong held the belts until March 15, when they were defeated by The MOD Squad. In June 1987, they unsuccessfully challenged for the NWA United States Tag Team Championship, losing to the Midnight Express (Stan Lane and Bobby Eaton).

=== Continental Wrestling Association (1987) ===
Smothers and Armstrong would next make a stop in the Continental Wrestling Association (CWA), where they faced Rough & Ready in October 1987.

=== New Japan Pro-Wrestling (1988) ===
The Southern Boys went on tour in New Japan Pro-Wrestling in 1988 and experienced success, beating Kantaro Hoshino and Osamu Kido, Kuniaki Kobayashi and Norio Honaga, Kensuke Sasaki and Norio Honaga, and Seiji Sakaguchi and Tatsutoshi Goto. Their final match came on December 9, 1988, at the NJPW Japan Cup Series 1988 - Tag 21 television show, where they lost to Kotetsu Yamamoto and Yoshinari Tsuji.

=== United States Wrestling Association (1988–1989) ===
Tracy Smothers and eventually Steve Armstrong made a jump back to the CWA, where they became embroiled in a feud with the Stud Stable.

=== World Championship Wrestling (1990–1992) ===
==== The Wild-Eyed Southern Boys (1990–1991) ====
Smothers and Armstrong made their debut for World Championship Wrestling on April 23, 1990, in a dark match at a WCW Main Event/NWA Worldwide taping in Marietta, Georgia. Wrestling as "the Wild-Eyed Southern Boys", their first television appearance came on May 12 at a World Championship Wrestling taping where they defeated Kevin Sullivan and Cactus Jack via disqualification. On May 20 on the Main Event the new team upset WCW United States Tag Team Champions The Midnight Express in a non-title match. Later that month they entered a house show series against WCW World Tag Team Champions Doom, but were unsuccessful in their efforts.

On June 13, 1990, they faced off against the Fabulous Freebirds at Clash of the Champions XI and were victorious. Jimmy Garvin and Michael Hayes were able to gain a measure of revenge by defeating them on the June 16th, 1990 episode of WCW Worldwide after holding the tights. An appearance by the Midnight Express' manager Jim Cornette would transition the Southern Boys to their first feud. This led to the first PPV showing for Smothers and Armstrong, as they fell to The Midnight Express on July 7, 1990, at the Great American Bash 1990. Smothers and Armstrong would continue to feud with the Midnight Express before transitioning to a series against the self-declared "Southern Champions" the Fabulous Freebirds. In August they engaged in a "best of 3" series against the Freebirds, and on September 5, 1990, they defeated Hayes and Garvin at Clash of the Champions XII.

On the September 22, 1990, episode of World Championship Wrestling the Southern Boys fell once more to The Midnight Express in a match where the winner received a United States Tag Team Championship shot. On the October 6th episode of The Main Event, the duo fell to the newly arrived Nasty Boys. Their televised slump continued at the Halloween Havoc 1990, where they were defeated by the Master Blasters (Al Green and a rookie Kevin Nash) after Jim Cornette interfered in the match. Cornette and Stan Lane departed from the promotion immediately afterwards, and there was no resolution to the Southern Boys/Midnight Express storyline. They moved instead to a house show series with the Master Blasters.

==== The Young Pistols (1991–1992) ====
1991 saw an immediate reversal of fortunes for the young team. In January they opened the year with several wins over the Master Blasters, and on February 24, 1991, at WrestleWar 1991 they beat The Royal Family. A few days earlier at a television taping in Montgomery, Alabama they were renamed "the Young Pistols". In March they began a house show series against Moondog Rex and Dutch Mantell, the latter who would ultimately become The Desperados. On May 19, 1991, their televised win streak came to an end when they were defeated by The Freebirds at SuperBrawl I in a match to claim the vacated United States Tag Team Championship after Badstreet interfered. This began a renewed feud with the Freebirds, and on June 12, 1991, they teamed with Tom Zenk to defeat Michael Hayes, Jimmy Garvin, and Badstreet at Clash of the Champions XV.

That summer, an injury to Scott Steiner led to the WCW World Tag Team Championship being vacated. On August 3, 1991, the Young Pistols participated in a tournament to crown new champions; they were defeated by the York Foundation. On September 21, 1991, they received a non-title match against the eventual winners of that tournament, the Enforcers (Arn Anderson and Larry Zbyszko but were unsuccessful. On the November 17, 1991, episode of WCW Main Event, Smothers challenged "Stunning" Steve Austin for the WCW World Television Championship. That fall the Pistols continued to face the York Foundation on the house show circuit.

At Halloween Havoc 1991, the Pistols began to show the first signs of an attitude change, stating that they did not care who was the "WCW Phantom" (eventually revealed that night as Rick Rude), but were instead waiting for a United States Tag Team Championship title shot against the WCW Patriots. On the December 8, 1991 episode of WCW Main Event, they finally received their shot. After initially being declared the winners, the match was restarted and the Patriots won. The following week they declared that they were unconcerned with what the fans thought, confirming a heel turn. Later that night, the Pistols defeated the WCW Patriots to win the United States Tag Team Championship.

The Young Pistols entered 1992 as champions and defeated The Patriots in another rematch on January 18 episode of WCW Pro. On January 25, on WCW Worldwide, they beat former champions Tom Zenk and Brian Pillman. However their run with the titles ended on the February 16th episode of Pro where they lost the championship to Ron Simmons and Big Josh. In February the Young Pistols moved to a house show series against the Steiner Brothers. They were scheduled to team with the Vegas Connection (Vinnie Vegas and Dallas Page) in an eight man tag team match against El Gigante, Big Josh, Johnny B. Badd, and Mike Graham at SuperBrawl II on February 29; however the match was cancelled.

In April 1992, Steve Armstrong left WCW, leaving Tracy Smothers to soldier on as a singles competitor. Tracy departed that August and joined Smoky Mountain Wrestling later that year. Armstrong went to WWF for a brief singles run as Lance Cassidy before joining Smothers in Smoky Mountain Wrestling, teaming with his brother Scott.

=== Ohio Valley Wrestling (2000) ===
In 2000, the Southern Boys teamed up briefly in Ohio Valley Wrestling where they feuded with the Disciples of Syn.

== Championships ==
- Championship Wrestling from Florida
  - NWA Florida Tag Team Championship (1 time)
- Continental Championship Wrestling / Continental Wrestling Federation
  - NWA Southeast Tag Team Championship / CWF Tag Team Championship (2 times)
- Ohio Valley Wrestling
  - OVW Southern Tag Team Championship (1 time)
- World Championship Wrestling
  - WCW United States Tag Team Championship (1 time)
