= WCW United States Tag Team Championship =

Former professional wrestling title

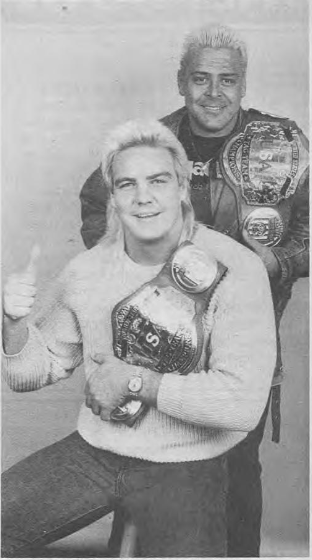
- Ron Garvin and Barry Windham as the NWA United States Tag Team Champions (Mid-Atlantic version), c. 1987

Details
- Promotion: Jim Crockett Promotions (1986–1988); World Championship Wrestling (1988–1992)
- Date established: September 28, 1986
- Date retired: July 31, 1992

Other name
- NWA United States Tag Team Championship (Mid-Atlantic version)
Statistics
- First champions: The Russians Ivan Koloff and Krusher Khruschev
- Final champions: The Barbarian and Dick Slater
- Most reigns: The Midnight Express Bobby Eaton and Stan Lane (3 reigns)
- Longest reign: The Midnight Express (Bobby Eaton and Stan Lane) (first reign, 346 days)
- Shortest reign: Fantastics (Bobby Fulton and Tommy Rogers) (second reign, 19 days)

The WCW United States Tag Team Championship, originally known as the NWA United States Tag Team Championship (Mid-Atlantic version), was a professional wrestling tag team championship contested for in professional wrestling promotions Jim Crockett Promotions (JCP) and World Championship Wrestling (WCW).

In 1986, NWA President and JCP owner Jim Crockett Jr. introduced the championship to replace and consolidate the NWA Mid-Atlantic Tag Team Championship and NWA National Tag Team Championship titles, under the name "NWA United States Tag Team Championship (Mid-Atlantic version)", by announcing a tournament for the newly created title, which was won by Krusher Khruschev and Ivan Koloff on September 28, 1986.

In 1988, Crockett sold JCP to Ted Turner, who established WCW as its successor; however, the title continued to be defended under the NWA name until January 1991, when the WCW owned and controlled titles were rebranded. The final champions under the NWA name were The Steiner Brothers (Rick and Scott). Following the rebranding, the title was referred to as the "WCW United States Tag Team Championship", though the belts retained the design with the NWA initials (and WCW itself would not leave the NWA permanently until September 1993). On July 31, 1992, WCW stripped the final champions, The Barbarian and Dick Slater, of their titles and retired the championship in order to put the focus on the WCW World Tag Team Championship.

NWA/WCW United States Tag Team Championship reigns were determined by professional wrestling matches, in which competitors are involved in scripted rivalries. These narratives create feuds between the various competitors, which cast them as villains and heroes. Overall, there are 19 reigns among 15 tag teams, all of which have occurred in the United States. From the information known, The Midnight Express (Bobby Eaton and Stan Lane)'s first reign is the longest in the title's history at 346 days, while The Fantastics (Bobby Fulton and Tommy Rogers)' second reign is the shortest, at 19 days. The Midnight Express also holds the most reigns overall as a tag team and individually, with three.

== Reigns ==
Over the championship's five-year history, there have been 19 reigns between 15 teams composed of 28 individual champions and three vacancies. Ivan Koloff and Krusher Khruschev were the inaugural champions, while The Barbarian and Dick Slater were the last ones. The Midnight Express (Bobby Eaton and Stan Lane) held the record for most reigns, both as a team and individually, at three. The Midnight Express' first reign is the longest at 346 days, while The Fantastics (Bobby Fulton and Tommy Rogers)'s second reign was the shortest at 19 days.

=== Names ===
Name	Years
NWA United States Tag Team Championship (Mid-Atlantic version)	September 28, 1986 – January 1991
WCW United States Tag Team Championship	January 1991 – July 31, 1992

Key
No.	Overall reign number
Reign	Reign number for the specific team—reign numbers for the individuals are in parentheses, if different
Days	Number of days held

No.	Champion	Championship change			Reign statistics		Notes	Ref.
No.	Champion	Date	Event	Location	Reign	Days	Notes	Ref.
National Wrestling Alliance (NWA) / Jim Crockett Promotions (JCP)
1	The Russians (Ivan Koloff and Krusher Khruschev)	September 28, 1986	House show	Atlanta, GA	1	72	Defeated Kansas Jayhawks (Bobby Jaggers and Dutch Mantel) in a tournament final to become the inaugural champions.	
2	Barry Windham and Ron Garvin	December 9, 1986	NWA Pro Wrestling	Spartanburg, SC	1	95	Aired on tape delay on December 13, 1986	
3	Dick Murdoch and Ivan Koloff (2)	March 14, 1987	World Championship Wrestling	Atlanta, GA	1	21		
—	Vacated	April 4, 1987	—	—	—	—	Dick Murdoch was suspended from in-ring competition by the NWA after performing a brainbuster on Nikita Koloff on a concrete floor, and as a result, Ivan Koloff and Murdoch were stripped of the titles.	
4	The Midnight Express (Bobby Eaton and Stan Lane)	May 16, 1987	World Championship Wrestling	Atlanta, GA	1	346	Defeated Barry Windham and Ron Garvin in a tournament final to win the vacant championship.	
World Championship Wrestling (WCW)
5	The Fantastics (Bobby Fulton and Tommy Rogers)	April 26, 1988	World Wide Wrestling	Chattanooga, TN	1	75	Aired on tape delay May 14, 1988.	
6	The Midnight Express (Bobby Eaton and Stan Lane)	July 10, 1988	The Great American Bash	Baltimore, MD	2	62		
—	Vacated	September 10, 1988	—	—	—	—	The NWA vacated the titles after Eaton and Lane won the NWA World Tag Team Championship.	
7	The Fantastics (Bobby Fulton and Tommy Rogers)	December 7, 1988	Clash of the Champions IV: Season's Beatings	Chattanooga, TN	2	19	Defeated Eddie Gilbert and Ron Simmons in a tournament final to win the vacant championship.	
8	The Varsity Club (Kevin Sullivan and Steve Williams)	December 26, 1988	Starrcade	Norfolk, VA	1	64		
9	Eddie Gilbert and Rick Steiner	February 28, 1989	World Wide Wrestling	Columbia, SC	1	(Note: The exact date on which Eddie Gilbert and Rick Steiner lost the championship is not known, which means that their reign lasted between 62 and 91 days.)	Aired on tape delay on March 18, 1989.	
—	Vacated	May 1, 1989	—	—	—	—	NWA abandoned the titles after Eddie Gilbert and Rick Steiner split as a team so Rick could team with his brother Scott Steiner. Gilbert and Rick Steiner were still champions as of May 7, 1989.	
10	Brian Pillman and The Z-Man	February 12, 1990	World Wide Wrestling	Rainsville, AL	1	96	Defeated (The Fabulous Freebirds) (Jimmy Garvin and Michael Hayes) in a tournament final to win the revived championship. Aired on tape delay on February 24, 1990.	
11	The Midnight Express (Bobby Eaton and Stan Lane)	May 19, 1990	Capital Combat	Washington, D.C.	3	97		
12	The Steiner Brothers (Rick Steiner (2) and Scott Steiner)	August 24, 1990	House show	East Rutherford, NJ	1	225	During this reign, the title was renamed the WCW United States Tag Team Championship.	
—	Vacated	April 6, 1991	World Wide Wrestling	—	—	—	Announced April 6, 1991 by WCW Board of Directors spokesman Grizzly Smith, as a result of The Steiner Brothers winning the WCW World Tag Team Championship during this reign.	
13	The Fabulous Freebirds (Jimmy Garvin and Michael Hayes)	May 19, 1991	SuperBrawl I	St. Petersburg, FL	1	85	Defeated The Young Pistols (Steve Armstrong and Tracey Smothers) in a Top Contenders match to win the vacant championship.	
14	The Patriots (Firebreaker Chip and Todd Champion)	August 12, 1991	World Championship Wrestling	Gainesville, GA	1	85	Aired on tape delay on September 7, 1991.	
15	The Young Pistols (Steve Armstrong and Tracy Smothers)	November 5, 1991	WCW Main Event	Gainesville, GA	1	70	Aired on tape delay on December 15, 1991.	
16	Big Josh and Ron Simmons	January 14, 1992	WCW Main Event	Columbus, GA	1	34	Aired on tape delay on February 16, 1992.	
17	Greg Valentine and Terry Taylor	February 17, 1992	World Championship Wrestling	Rock Hill, SC	1	90	Aired on tape delay on February 29, 1992.	
18	The Fabulous Freebirds (Jimmy Garvin and Michael Hayes)	May 17, 1992	WrestleWar	Jacksonville, FL	2	34		
19	The Barbarian and Dick Slater	June 25, 1992	WCW Main Event	Kansas City, MO	1	36	Aired on tape delay on July 12, 1992	
—	Vacated	July 31, 1992	—	—	—	—	On the July 4, 1992 edition of WCW Saturday Night, VP Bill Watts announced that the company would be looking to consolidate the WCW World, NWA World, and US Tag Team Titles to focus on one championship team. Watts deemed that whoever held the US Tag Title at the end of July would be the final titleholders. The Championship was deactivated during The Barbarian and Dick Slater's title reign on July 31, 1992.	

== Combined reigns ==
As of August 21, 2025.

†	Indicates the current champions
¤	The exact length of at least one title reign is uncertain; the combined length may not be correct.

=== By team ===
Rank	Team	No. of reigns	Combined days
1	The Midnight Express (Bobby Eaton and Stan Lane)	3	505
2	The Steiner Brothers (Rick Steiner and Scott Steiner)	1	225
3	The Fabulous Freebirds (Jimmy Garvin and Michael Hayes)	2	124
4	Brian Pillman and The Z-Man	1	96
5	Barry Windham and Ron Garvin	1	95
6	The Fantastics (Bobby Fulton and Tommy Rogers)	2	94
7	Greg Valentine and Terry Taylor	1	90
8	The Patriots (Firebreaker Chip and Todd Champion)	1	85
9	Ivan Koloff and Krusher Khruschev	1	72
10	The Young Pistols; Steve Armstrong and Tracy Smothers	1	70
11	The Varsity Club (Kevin Sullivan and Steve Williams)	1	64
12	Eddie Gilbert and Rick Steiner	1	62 – 91¤
13	The Barbarian and Dick Slater	1	36
14	Big Josh and Ron Simmons	1	34
15	Dick Murdoch and Ivan Koloff	1	21

=== Individual ===
Rank	Wrestler	No. of reigns	Combined days
1	Bobby Eaton	3	505
1	Stan Lane	3	505
3	Rick Steiner	2	287 – 316¤
4	Scott Steiner	1	225
5	Jimmy Garvin	2	124
5	Michael Hayes	2	124
7	Brian Pillman	1	96
7	The Z-Man	1	96
9	Barry Windham	1	95
9	Ron Garvin	1	95
11	Bobby Fulton	2	94
11	Tommy Rogers	2	94
13	Ivan Koloff	2	93
14	Greg Valentine	1	90
14	Terry Taylor	1	90
16	Firebreaker Chip	1	85
16	Todd Champion	1	85
18	Krusher Khruschev	1	72
19	Steve Armstrong	1	70
19	Tracy Smothers	1	70
21	Kevin Sullivan	1	64
21	Steve Williams	1	64
23	Eddie Gilbert	1	62 – 91¤
24	The Barbarian	1	36
24	Dick Slater	1	36
26	Big Josh	1	34
26	Ron Simmons	1	34
28	Dick Murdoch	1	21

== See also ==
- List of National Wrestling Alliance championships
- NWA World Tag Team Championship
- List of NWA World Tag Team Champions
