= Mike Moore (wrestler) =

American professional wrestler

Personal information
- Born: Michael Eugene Moore; August 14, 1958 (age 67) Detroit, Michigan, United States

Professional wrestling career
- Ring name(s): The Motor City Madman; Man Mountain Mike Moore; Big Mike Moore
- Billed height: 6 ft 4 in (193 cm)
- Billed weight: 320 lb (145 kg)
- Billed from: "Parts Unknown"
- Debut: 1986
- Retired: 1993

Michael Eugene Moore (born August 12, 1958) is an American retired professional wrestler. He is best known under the ring names Motor City Madman and Man Mountain Mike Moore, and for appearances in World Championship Wrestling (WCW).

== Career ==
He debuted in 1982 and later came to prominence in 1987, when he was part of the tag team the "Motor City Madmen", managed by Paul E. Dangerously. During his subsequent time in WCW, he appeared at Starrcade (1990), tag teaming with Curtis Hughes against The Skyscrapers and at the Clash of the Champions XIII: Thanksgiving Thunder where he was defeated by Lex Luger. In 1991, he was rated #296 in Pro Wrestling Illustrated's annual PWI 500.

After leaving wrestling, he joined the Screen Actors Guild and appeared in TV commercials and in small roles on TV shows.
