= J-Tex Corporation =

Professional wrestling stable

Stable
- Members: See below
- Name(s): J-Tex Corporation; Gary Hart International
- Debut: 1989
- Disbanded: 1990

The J-Tex Corporation, also known as Gary Hart International, was a heel professional wrestling stable in World Championship Wrestling. The group was managed by Gary Hart and consisted of several popular wrestlers including Terry Funk, Dick Slater, The Great Muta, The Dragonmaster, and Buzz Sawyer. Their name was reference to the fact that its two prominent members, Muta and Funk, were from Japan and Texas, respectively.

== History ==
The group was conceived in July 1989, feuding primarily with NWA World Champion Ric Flair and Sting and then with the Four Horsemen after their surprise reformation later that year.

Prior to the Horsemen's reformation, Flair and Sting defeated Slater and Muta by disqualification at Clash of the Champions VIII on September 12, 1989. Post-match, Funk tried to suffocate Flair by putting a plastic bag over his head. This led to their highly acclaimed non-title "I Quit" match at Clash of the Champions IX on November 15, in which Flair defeated Funk.

During this time, Muta faced Sting in one of the year's greatest feuds, eventually winning his NWA World Television Championship. The title had been vacated after a controversial match at The Great American Bash (1989) pay-per-view in July 1989, but eventually Muta won the title in a no disqualification match in September after using a blackjack. He held the title for four months before losing to Arn Anderson in January 1990.

Also at the 1989 Great American Bash, Ric Flair faced Terry Funk in the main event. After retaining his NWA title, Flair was attacked by Muta post-match. Sting came to Flair's rescue which, given their fierce rivalry the year prior, was an amazing surprise to fans. Sting and Flair feuded with Funk and Muta for the rest of the year in one of the NWA's most memorable battles, including a Thunderdome match called by Bruno Sammartino at Halloween Havoc. When Flair reformed the Four Horsemen in December 1989, Sting was quick to join him along with Arn and Ole Anderson.

The culmination of this feud took place on February 6, 1990 at Clash of the Champions X, where the two stables faced off in the main event Six man tag team steel cage match. During the event, however, the Horsemen returned to their heel nature; after demanding an NWA World Heavyweight title shot from Flair, Sting was effectively thrown out of the Horsemen, thus restarting their rivalry. This attributed to shifting the heat away from their feud with J-Tex Corporation, and despite their impressive roster, J-Tex ultimately disbanded shortly after the event. Muta subsequently returned to New Japan Pro-Wrestling, while Terry Funk briefly retired from wrestling to become a color commentator with Chris Cruise on World Wide Wrestling.

== Members ==
- Gary Hart (manager)
- Terry Funk
- Dick Slater
- The Great Muta
- The Dragonmaster/Mr J
- Buzz Sawyer

== Championships and accomplishments ==
- Jim Crockett Promotions
  - NWA World Television Championship (1 time) – The Great Muta
- Pro Wrestling Illustrated
  - PWI Feud of the Year (1989) – Terry Funk vs. Ric Flair

== See also ==
- Stud Stable
