= Brenau Downtown Center =

Event facility in Gainesville, Georgia

Coordinates: 34.2978246°N 83.8256353°W

- Interactive map of Brenau Downtown Center
- Former names: Georgia Mountains Center (1980–2013)
- Address: Gainesville; United States
- Owner: Brenau University
- Operator: Brenau University
- Capacity: 2,500 (former arena capacity)
- Type: Event facility, university graduate facility, and theater

Construction
- Built: 1980
- Opened: 1980
- Renovated: 2013

Tenants
- Brenau University Graduate Programs in Health Sciences; Gainesville Theatre Alliance; John Jarrard Foundation

Brenau Downtown Center is an event facility operated by Brenau University in Gainesville, Georgia.

The facility was originally built as Georgia Mountains Center in 1980 by the City of Gainesville as a multi-purpose facility and featured an 18,000 square foot arena capable of seating up to 2,500 people. The arena had a 24' ceiling height and balcony seating along two walls. In the past, it has hosted trade shows, conventions, among other social, business, and sporting events. WCW taped a lot of their TV wrestling shows here in the late 80's and early 90's. Wrestling history was made at the center on May 1, 1981 as Harley Race defeated Tommy Rich to win the NWA World Heavyweight Title. In addition to box office and food service facilities, the Georgia Mountains Center included a 300-seat theater with a 16-foot proscenium and 36' by 27' stage with full fly loft and orchestra pit. Three meeting rooms of various sizes are located within the center, and can seat up to 375 people when utilized together.

In 2013, the Georgia Mountains Center was converted into Brenau Downtown Center. The arena portion of the former Georgia Mountains Center was remodeled into a two-story facility that houses the university's graduate programs in the health sciences like physical therapy. The theater is still open for public use and continue to be a prominent venue for groups like the Gainesville Theatre Alliance and the John Jarrard Foundation.
