= Three Faces of Fear =

Professional wrestling stable

The Three Faces of Fear

Stable
- Members: Kevin Sullivan; The Butcher; Avalanche
- Debut: October, 1994
- Disbanded: January, 1995

The Three Faces of Fear was a professional wrestling stable in World Championship Wrestling, from late 1994 to early 1995. Composed of Kevin Sullivan, The Butcher and Avalanche, the group fought against Hulk Hogan.

== History ==
=== Origins ===
When Hulk Hogan signed with WCW in June 1994, he soon got a huge fan in Dave Sullivan, something which did not sit well with Dave's kayfabe brother Kevin Sullivan, who quickly developed an intense hatred of Hulk Hogan and everything associated with him. Kevin turned on his brother after a tag-team match and beat him up.

At Clash Of The Champions XXVIII, Hogan was scheduled to defend his newly won WCW World Heavyweight Championship against Ric Flair. At the top of the show, Hogan was attacked by a man wearing a black mask and bodysuit, who struck him in the knee with a metal pipe. Taken to the hospital, Hogan returned just in time for the main event, but hampered by the injury, he lost by countout.

From August through October 1994, Hogan tried on several occasions to find out who the mystery assailant was to no avail. At Halloween Havoc, the mysterious attacker appeared again and was now unmasked and revealed as Hogan's long time friend and Mega-Maniacs tag team partner Brother Bruti. In the moments after the reveal, Bruti, who would take on the name of The Butcher, was joined by Kevin Sullivan and Hogan's former WWF rival, Avalanche, as the trio formed The Three Faces of Fear with the goal of destroying Hulkamania.

=== Matches with Hulk Hogan ===
On November 16, 1994, the trio lost to Hogan, Dave Sullivan and Sting at Clash of the Champions XXIX.

In December, The Butcher, accompanied by Kevin Sullivan, challenged Hogan for the WCW World Heavyweight Title at Starrcade 1994. Hogan retained the title by pinfall.

After the match, "Macho Man" Randy Savage appeared and initially looked like he had joined The Three Faces of Fear, but then sided with Hogan, setting up a tag team match pitting Hogan and Savage against Sullivan and the Butcher at Clash of the Champions XXX in January 1995 which ended with Hogan pinning The Butcher.

=== Break up ===
This match was the last confrontation between the group and Hogan, as both set off in different directions. Hogan began feuding with Big Van Vader, who had attacked him after the match, while The Three Faces of Fear disintegrated when Sullivan attacked the Butcher, and Avalanche began pursuing a feud with Sting. The name "Three Faces of Fear" was quickly phased out.

According to the storyline, the Butcher fell into amnesia due to the injuries sustained in the attack. The Butcher became known as The Man with No Name and lost to Kevin Sullivan at Slamboree 1995, after which he disappeared from WCW.

=== Aftermath ===
The members of the group eventually reunited later in 1995, when Kevin Sullivan founded the new Dungeon of Doom stable, which among others also included The Shark and The Zodiac, the former Avalanche and Butcher respectively. However, no connection to their former gimmicks or to the former group was made. The stable also included Meng and The Barbarian who competed under the name The Faces of Fear which was given to them by Sullivan who was the head booker for WCW because he liked the name.
