= Gary Hart (wrestler) =

American professional wrestler and manager (1942–2008)

- Hart, c. 1985

Personal information
- Born: Gary Richard Williams; January 24, 1942 Evansville, Indiana, U.S.
- Died: March 16, 2008 (aged 66) Euless, Texas, U.S.

Professional wrestling career
- Ring name(s): Gary Hart; Jackal
- Billed height: 6 ft 3 in (191 cm)
- Billed weight: 240 lb (109 kg)
- Debut: 1960
- Retired: 2004

Gary Richard Williams (January 24, 1942 – March 16, 2008) was an American professional wrestling manager, as well as a professional wrestler in his early career, best known by his ring name Gary Hart. Hart was one of the pivotal driving forces behind what is considered to be World Class Championship Wrestling's "golden years" in the early 1980s.

== Professional wrestling career ==
=== Early career (1960–1979) ===
Gary Hart started wrestling in Chicago at the Marigold Arena in 1960. His uncle, Billy Gates, worked as a booking agent for Chicago promoter Fred Kohler. After working in Chicago, he worked in Detroit until 1964. He then worked on and off in Australia under Jim Barnett until 1974 when he relocated with Barnett to Atlanta becoming involved in Georgia Championship Wrestling. After Georgia, he worked in Florida in 1975 managing Pak Song Nam.

In the late 1960s, he retired from in-ring competition and transitioned into a managerial role, going under the name "Playboy" Gary Hart. During the late 1960s, he managed The Spoiler, as well as the tag team duo The Spoilers, which consisted of Spoilers #1 (Don Jardine) and #2 (Smasher Sloan). They won several tag team titles in 1968 and 1969 under Hart's guidance.

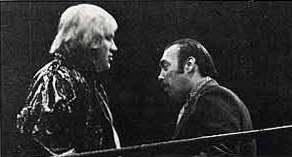
Hart (right) with Big John Studd in 1977

On February 20, 1975, Hart, along with Austin Idol and Bobby Shane, were passengers on a Cessna 182 flown by wrestler Buddy Colt that crashed into Tampa Bay while attempting to land at Peter O. Knight Airport in Tampa, Florida. Shane was killed and the other three men suffered serious injuries. Hart was thrown from the plane into the water with a broken arm, wrist, knee, back, sternum, collarbone and vertebrae with his right eye knocked loose and his nose partially severed. Despite this, he managed to locate Idol and help him to shore, then swam back out to rescue Colt. However, Hart was unable to find Shane, who was later found still strapped into his seat in the submerged plane wreckage. Hart was reportedly plagued by the memory, and for decades wondered whether he had done everything he could to save Shane.

=== World Class Championship Wrestling (1979–1988) ===
Hart with Chris Adams, who had turned heel on Kevin Von Erich at Hart's instigation

Hart became the booker for World Class Championship Wrestling (WCCW; then known as Big Time Wrestling) in 1976, a position he held until January 1983, then again from 1986 to 1988. The years between 1982 and 1985 are considered to be the "Golden Years" of the promotion. Hart created the classic feud between The Von Erichs and The Fabulous Freebirds, as well as forming The Stable of H. & H. Ltd in 1982 with Arman Hussian that introduced characters (Bugsy McGraw, Bill Irwin, Checkmate, Killer Brooks and Ten Gu), he also managed The Great Kabuki, The One Man Gang, King Kong Bundy, and The Samoan SWAT Team. Hart additionally managed talent such as "Gorgeous" Gino Hernandez and Gentleman Chris Adams. Along with booking, he also managed Nord the Barbarian, Abdullah The Butcher, Al Perez and Jeep Swenson under the stable "New Age Management".

=== Georgia and Mid-Atlantic (1983–1988) ===
During World Class's golden era, Hart was also a manager in the Georgia and Mid-Atlantic regions of the NWA; joining these two areas exclusively in 1983 shortly after the start of the Freebirds-Von Erichs feud, when he left World Class due to a pay dispute. Hart returned to Texas in the summer of 1984 and following a short hiatus in 1986; stayed with the promotion until 1988. Hart was also a promoter and manager in San Antonio for Texas All-Star Wrestling, the successor of Joe Blanchard's Southwest Championship Wrestling (SCW) group. He also worked for the ICW, first as the heel manager of Bruiser Brody, Kevin Sullivan and Mark Lewin. During one storyline, Hart had a falling-out with Sullivan, after which Lewin attacked Hart with a sleeper hold.

=== Jim Crockett Promotions / World Championship Wrestling (1988–1990) ===
Shortly after Al Perez lost the WCWA World Heavyweight Championship to Kerry Von Erich on March 6, 1988, Hart continued to manage Perez in the National Wrestling Alliance (NWA)'s Jim Crockett Promotions in 1988, along with Larry Zbyszko and Ron Garvin after Garvin turned heel on Dusty Rhodes. In 1989, he managed the stable J-Tex Corporation, which included Terry Funk, Dick Slater, Buzz Sawyer, The Dragonmaster, and The Great Muta. They feuded primarily with Ric Flair and Sting, but Ole and Arn Anderson later teamed up with Flair and Sting to even the sides up (and thus bringing back The Four Horseman briefly). Hart's last match was a lost to Sting in a match on October 8, 1989, at a house show. J-Tex disbanded in early 1990.

=== Later career (1990–2004) ===
After leaving WCW, Hart returned to Texas and began a new wrestling promotion in North Dallas, the Texas Wrestling Federation, which showcased many former stars of World Class and those who were competing in the USWA/World Class promotion.

During the 1990s, following the demise of the Global Wrestling Federation, Hart and Chris Adams were involved in many Texas-based wrestling promotions, including an ill-fated attempt to revive World Class (billed as World Class II: The Next Generation) at the Dallas Sportatorium. Hart retired in 1999, but made a surprise return in Major League Wrestling (MLW), during the promotion's Reloaded Tour on January 9–10, 2004. Hart appeared following the main event (on January 9) pitting Low Ki against Homicide, where the three laid out several wrestlers from the locker room, as well MLW president Court Bauer. MLW closed its doors before any resolution could be provided, only to resume operations in 2017.

== Death ==
Hart died on March 16, 2008, following a heart attack at his home in Euless, Texas, after returning from an autograph session in Allentown, Pennsylvania. On April 5, 2008, Peach State Pandemonium, an internet wrestling program, aired a two-hour tribute program in the memory of Hart. From Tulsa, Oklahoma Kris Thorn, "Cowboy" Bill Watts, Jack Brisco, James Beard, Abdullah The Butcher, Michael "P.S." Hayes, Kevin Sullivan, George Steele, Skandor Akbar, and Jim Ross were among those who attended. Following his death, his autobiography, My Life In Wrestling...With A Little Help From My Friends, was released on June 30, 2009, but is now out of print.

== Championships and accomplishments ==
- Big Time Wrestling
  - NWA American Tag Team Championship (3 times) – with The Spoiler
- National Wrestling Alliance
  - NWA Hall of Fame (Class of 2016)
- Professional Wrestling Hall of Fame
  - Class of 2014
- Wrestling Observer Newsletter
  - Wrestling Observer Newsletter Hall of Fame (Class of 2018)
- WWE
  - WWE Hall of Fame (Class of 2020)
