= Tommy Rogers (wrestler) =

American professional wrestler (1961-2015)

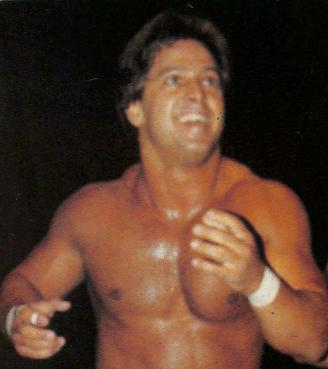
- Rogers, c. 1987

Personal information
- Born: Thomas R. Couch; May 14, 1961 St. Petersburg, Florida, U.S.
- Died: June 1, 2015 (aged 54) Honolulu, Hawaii, U.S.

Professional wrestling career
- Ring name(s): Tommy Couch; Tommy Rogers
- Billed height: 5 ft 9 in (175 cm)
- Billed weight: 222 lb (101 kg)
- Billed from: Los Angeles, California
- Trained by: Buzz Sawyer; Jack Brisco; Jerry Brisco
- Debut: 1980
- Retired: 2007

Thomas R. Couch (May 14, 1961 – June 1, 2015) was an American professional wrestler, better known by his ring name, "Fantastic" Tommy Rogers. He was one-half of the tag team the Fantastics with Bobby Fulton.

== Professional wrestling career ==
Couch started wrestling in 1980 as "Tommy Rogers" in North Carolina. He made his debut (as a replacement for Charlie Cook) in a match with Eddy Mansfield with no formal training. Tommy then headed to Florida for a brief stay before heading to Portland, then Memphis where he met his future tag team partner Bobby Fulton. In a talent trade agreement between Memphis (Jarrett) and Mid South (Watts) the newly formed Fantastics (Rogers and Fulton) headed to Mid South. There they had their first major program with the Midnight Express (Condrey and Eaton). In late 1984, Rogers went to World Class Championship Wrestling where he and Bobby Fulton continued their legendary feud with the Midnight Express. In 1986, Rogers and Fulton went to the Universal Wrestling Federation where they had a long series of violent matches against The Sheepherders (Butch Miller & Luke Williams). They went back to WCCW in 1987 and feuded with Mike Davis and Tommy Lane, the Rock 'N Roll RPMs. The feud ended after The Fantastics won a scaffold match at "The Parade of Champions". In 1988, they went to the NWA's Jim Crockett Promotions to renew their feud with the Midnight Express. They left in 1989 and had been wrestling in the independents ever since.

The Fantastics spent several tours in Japan during the 1990s working with such names as Joe and Dean Malenko. In 1994 they returned to World Championship Wrestling (WCW) formerly the Jim Crockett Promotions where they feuded with Pretty Wonderful and Harlem Heat. In 1997, Rogers and Fulton both wrestled in the World Wrestling Federation's Light Heavyweight Division. They were pitted against each other once on an episode of Monday Night Raw. Also Rogers lost to Brian Christopher on WWF Shotgun. Rogers defeated Fulton with the Tomakaze, a finishing maneuver of Tommy's invention later adopted by Christian Cage. Also in 1997 The Fantastics made an appearance at the World Wrestling Council in Puerto Rico. Rogers wrestled in ECW from 1997 to 1999, where he briefly teamed with Jerry Lynn. Rogers also worked behind the scenes helping the ECW product as an agent. In 2000, he returned to WCW, where he lost to Kid Romeo and Lash LeRoux. In 2005, the Fantastics reformed on the indie circuit. They won the SCW Tag Team Championship by defeating the Midnight Express in a steel cage match. In 2006, Tommy moved to Honolulu, Hawaii.

After undergoing hip replacement surgery in January 2007, he retired from the ring.

== Death ==
On June 1, 2015, Couch was found dead in his Honolulu home by his roommate. The cause of death was not released.

== Championships and accomplishments ==
- All Japan Pro Wrestling
  - January 3 Korakuen Hall Junior Heavyweight Battle Royal (1990)
- Continental Wrestling Association
  - AWA Southern Tag Team Championship (1 time) – with Bobby Fulton
- International Wrestling Association of Japan
  - IWA World Junior Heavyweight Championship (1 time)
- Mid-Atlantic Championship Wrestling
  - NWA United States Tag Team Championship (2 times) – with Bobby Fulton
- Pro Wrestling America
  - PWA Tag Team Championship (1 time) – with Bobby Fulton
- Pro Wrestling Illustrated
  - PWI ranked him # 63 of the 100 best tag teams during the "PWI Years" with Bobby Fulton and # 269 of the Top 500 in 2003.
- Southeastern Championship Wrestling
  - NWA Southeast United States Junior Heavyweight Championship (1 time)
- Universal Wrestling Federation
  - UWF World Tag Team Championship (2 times) – with Bobby Fulton
- World Class Championship Wrestling / World Class Wrestling Association
  - NWA American Tag Team Championship (2 times) – with Bobby Fulton
  - WCWA World Tag Team Championship (2 times) – with Bobby Fulton
- Wrestling Observer Newsletter
  - Feud of the Year (1988) with Bobby Fulton vs Bobby Eaton and Stan Lane
