= The Skyscrapers =

Professional wrestling tag team

Tag team
- Members: "Big" Sid Vicious "Dangerous" Dan Spivey "Mean" Mark Callous "The Masked Skyscraper"
- Billed heights: Vicious: 6 ft 8 in (2.03 m); Spivey: 6 ft 8 in (2.03 m); Callous: 6 ft 10 in (2.08 m); Masked Skyscraper: 6 ft 4 in (1.93 m)
- Billed from: Metropolis
- Debut: 1989
- Disbanded: 1990

The Skyscrapers (or just Skyscrapers) were a professional wrestling tag team in World Championship Wrestling in 1989 and 1990 in three distinct forms with members "Big" Sid Vicious, "Dangerous" Dan Spivey, and "Mean" Mark Callous, with The Masked Skyscraper making a one-night appearance.

== Career ==
=== Background ===
In early 1989, Theodore Long was a referee for the National Wrestling Alliance, but due to a series of questionable calls, including one that cost the Road Warriors their world tag-team titles he was fired and took up managing instead.

=== First incarnation ===
Long paired 6 ft 8 in (2.03 m) Dan Spivey with 6 ft 8 in (2.03 m) Sid Vicious, two people who had recently signed with the promotion and gave them the name "The Skyscrapers" due to their size.

The Skyscrapers' first taste of success came at the 1989 Great American Bash PPV where they first co-won a Two-Ring King of the Hill Battle Royal with Sid being the survivor in one ring and Dan surviving in the other. The rules called for the two to fight each other but manager Teddy Long convinced them to shake hands and share the prize money before getting on the microphone and telling the crowd that what they had that the other tag teams didn't have was unity. Later in the night the Skyscrapers defeated The Dynamic Dudes (Johnny Ace and Shane Douglas) due to their overwhelming size and power.

The Skyscrapers quickly became involved in a feud with the Road Warriors, sparked by Teddy Long's actions while still a referee. The two teams were very evenly matched in power and intensity creating a series of matches that did not favor one team over the other. Spivey and Vicious were disqualified against the Road Warriors at Halloween Havoc 1989 but neither team looked like losers on the night. Shortly after Halloween Havoc the Skyscrapers faced the Steiner Brothers at Clash of the Champions IX in a hard hitting match. A match that was so hard hitting in fact that Sid Vicious suffered a punctured lung due to a broken rib.

=== Second incarnation ===
With Vicious out of action Teddy Long brought in another tall (6 ft 7 in (2.01 m)) newcomer in the same mold as Sid Vicious and Dan Spivey and dubbed him "Mean" Mark Callous. The New Skyscrapers immediately picked up the feud with the Road Warriors and kept on having inconclusive matches with them. At Clash of the Champions X the Skyscrapers finally got the better of the Road Warriors, not in the match but afterwards when they beat the Road Warriors down. At this point in time no one had ever been able to physically dominate the Road Warriors, something that pointed that big things had been planned for the Skyscrapers. But big things never happened, in the days before the scheduled Chicago Street Fight at WrestleWar 1990 Dan Spivey suddenly left WCW leaving the bookers to scramble for a replacement. Exactly why he left the federation so suddenly has never been stated.

=== Third incarnation ===
Instead of cancelling the announced match the bookers turned to Mike Enos, who was working for the American Wrestling Association at the time, and put him under a mask as The Masked Skyscraper. The Road Warriors made short work of Callous and the Masked Skyscraper ending the feud and ending the Skyscrapers run of domination. Callous decided to go on his own for a while but failed in a challenge to WCW United States Heavyweight Champion Lex Luger. He then quit and joined the World Wrestling Federation, where he became known as The Undertaker.

=== Reunited originals ===
By the end of 1990 Dan Spivey and WCW worked out whatever differences that caused Spivey to leave in the spring and Spivey returned to WCW television. The Skyscrapers briefly reunited at Starrcade 1990 as he and Sid Vicious took on and beat The Big Cat and The Motor City Madman. The match was the only time Spivey and Vicious teamed up to reform the original Skyscrapers

== Aftermath ==
In the WWF, Sid Vicious and Mean Mark Callous feuded with each other several times; they would wrestle each other at WrestleMania 13 for the WWF World Heavyweight Championship, with Sid Vicious as the WWF World Heavyweight Champion Sycho Sid and Mean Mark Callous as The Undertaker, where The Undertaker won the match and the Championship.

Before becoming a Skyscraper, Spivey had wrestled as "Golden Boy" Danny Spivey in the WWF from 1985–88 in a gimmick where with his blonde hair, height and build, yellow trunks and yellow boots saw him labelled by fans as a clone of then WWF World Heavyweight Champion Hulk Hogan. He returned to the WWF in 1995 under the name Waylon Mercy, this time with jet black hair, and ended up retiring later in the year. In between his WCW stint and second WWF stint as Mercy he competed in All Japan Pro Wrestling, winning the World Tag Team Championship once with another early 1990s WCW figure, Stan Hansen.

As for the Masked Skyscraper (Mike Enos), he and his Destruction Crew teammate Wayne Bloom made their way to the WWF in 1991 as Beau (Bloom) and Blake (Enos) Beverly, the Beverly Brothers. Enos also later toured Japan, though with New Japan Pro-Wrestling, where Vicious had once challenged for their title in the 1980s.
