= The Great American Bash (2000) =

World Championship Wrestling pay-per-view event

- VHS cover featuring Sting and Vampiro
- Promotion: World Championship Wrestling
- Date: June 11, 2000
- City: Baltimore, Maryland
- Venue: Baltimore Arena
- Attendance: 7,031
- Buy rate: 85,000
- Tagline: A Battle Of Heroic Proportions!

Pay-per-view chronology
← Previous; Slamboree	Next → Bash at the Beach

The Great American Bash chronology
← Previous; 1999	Next → 2004

The 2000 Great American Bash was the 10th Great American Bash professional wrestling pay-per-view (PPV) event produced by World Championship Wrestling (WCW), and 14th Great American Bash event overall. It took place on June 11, 2000, at the Baltimore Arena in Baltimore, Maryland. This was the eighth and final Great American Bash held at this venue after the 1988, 1989, 1990, 1991, 1996, 1998, and 1999 events.

This was the final Great American Bash event produced by WCW as in March 2001, WCW's assets were acquired by the World Wrestling Federation (WWF); the WWF was renamed to World Wrestling Entertainment (WWE) in 2002. In 2004, WWE revived The Great American Bash as their own annual PPV event. It was also the final non-WWF PPV held at this arena until All Elite Wrestling (AEW) held Full Gear in 2019.

== Production ==
=== Background ===
The Great American Bash is a professional wrestling event established in 1985. It was first produced by the National Wrestling Alliance's (NWA) Jim Crockett Promotions (JCP) and aired on closed-circuit television before becoming a pay-per-view event in 1988; JCP was rebranded as World Championship Wrestling (WCW) later that same year. WCW then seceded from the NWA in 1991. The 2000 event was the 10th Great American Bash event promoted by WCW and 14th overall. It took place on June 11, 2000 at the Baltimore Arena in Baltimore, Maryland. This was the eighth Great American Bash held at this venue after the 1988, 1989, 1990, 1991, 1996, 1998, and 1999 events.

=== Storylines ===
The event featured professional wrestling matches that involve different wrestlers from pre-existing scripted feuds and storylines. Professional wrestlers portray villains, heroes, or less distinguishable characters in the scripted events that build tension and culminate in a wrestling match or series of matches.

== Event ==
Other on-screen personnel
Role:	Name:
Commentators	Tony Schiavone
Commentators	Scott Hudson
Commentators	Mark Madden
Interviewers	Gene Okerlund
Interviewers	Pamela Paulshock
Referees	Mickie Jay
Referees	Mark Johnson
Referees	Nick Patrick
Referees	Charles Robinson
Referees	Billy Silverman
Referees	Jamie Tucker
Ring announcers	Michael Buffer
Ring announcers	David Penzer

Shane Douglas put the Wall through three tables at the same time to win. The first wrestler to put their opponent through three tables would win the match. Hollywood Hogan pinned Billy Kidman after hitting him with brass knuckles to become number one contender to the WCW World Heavyweight Championship. If Hogan had lost, he would have had to retire. If Ric Flair had lost his match, he would have had to retire. Vampiro set Sting on fire to win the match. Jeff Jarrett pinned Kevin Nash after a Spear from Goldberg. Konnan was guest bellringer, Rey Misterio Jr. was guest timekeeper, Disqo was guest beltkeeper, Juventud Guerrera was guest ring announcer. After the match, Goldberg joined the New Blood.

== Reception ==
In 2017, Kevin Pantoja of 411Mania gave the event a rating of 1.0 [Extremely Horrendous], stating, "I’ve now reviewed half the WCW PPVs in 2000 and the highest score one has gotten was 3.5/10. This was rough. When the best match involves David Flair, you know your show is in trouble. Two DUDs and two matches went into negative stars. That’s never a good thing. Not only was the wrestling bad, but nothing made sense. There were random turns for [no] reason (Goldberg and Kanyon), stupid stunts (Sting and Booker), overbooking, a lame circle cage match and stipulations that were wrongly done (Tables match). A giant mess."

== Aftermath ==
The 2000 Great American Bash was the final Great American Bash held by WCW, as in March 2001, the World Wrestling Federation (WWF) purchased WCW. In 2002, the WWF was renamed to World Wrestling Entertainment (WWE), and in 2004, WWE revived The Great American Bash as their own annual PPV. This was also the final non-WWF/E event at this venue until 2019 when startup promotion All Elite Wrestling held Full Gear at this venue, which was then renamed to Royal Farms Arena, now known as the CFG Bank Arena.

== Results ==
No.	Results	Stipulations	Times
1	Lieutenant Loco (c) (with The Misfits In Action) defeated Disqo (with The Filthy Animals)	Singles match for the WCW Cruiserweight Championship	04:57
2	KroniK (Brian Adams and Bryan Clark) defeated The Mamalukes (Big Vito and Johnny the Bull)	Tag team match to determine the #1 contenders for the WCW World Tag Team Championship	09:20
3	Mike Awesome defeated Diamond Dallas Page (with Chris Kanyon)	Ambulance match	09:41
4	GI Bro defeated Shawn Stasiak	Boot Camp match	13:58
5	Shane Douglas defeated The Wall	Tables match	08:12
6	Scott Steiner (with Midajah and Shakira) defeated Rick Steiner and Tank Abbott	Handicap Asylum match	03:46
7	Hollywood Hogan defeated Billy Kidman	Singles match with Horace Hogan as special guest referee	11:39
8	Ric Flair defeated David Flair (with Vince Russo)	Singles match	10:16
9	Vampiro defeated Sting	Human Torch match	07:23
10	Jeff Jarrett (c) defeated Kevin Nash	Singles match for the WCW World Heavyweight Championship	17:22
(c) / – the champion(s) heading into the match
