= The Great American Bash (1999) =

World Championship Wrestling pay-per-view event

- Promotional poster
- Promotion: World Championship Wrestling
- Date: June 13, 1999
- City: Baltimore, Maryland
- Venue: Baltimore Arena
- Attendance: 11,672
- Buy rate: 185,000
- Tagline: The Real Fireworks Start June 13th!

Pay-per-view chronology
| ← Previous; Slamboree | Next → Bash at the Beach |

The Great American Bash chronology
| ← Previous; 1998 | Next → 2000 |

The 1999 Great American Bash was the ninth Great American Bash professional wrestling pay-per-view (PPV) event produced by World Championship Wrestling (WCW), and 13th Great American Bash event overall. It took place on June 13, 1999, at the Baltimore Arena in Baltimore, Maryland. This was the seventh Great American Bash held at this venue after the 1988, 1989, 1990, 1991, 1996, and 1998 events. This was also the first PPV event to incorporate WCW's new logo, which had debuted two months prior.

Nine matches were contested at the event. In the main event, Kevin Nash retained his WCW World Heavyweight Championship against Randy Savage by disqualification. In other prominent matches, The Jersey Triad (Diamond Dallas Page and Chris Kanyon) defeated Chris Benoit and Perry Saturn to win the WCW World Tag Team Championship, Rick Steiner defeated Sting in a Falls Count Anywhere match, and Ric Flair defeated Roddy Piper by disqualification to regain the presidency of WCW. The event also marked the WCW return of Sid Vicious.

== Production ==
=== Background ===
The Great American Bash is a professional wrestling event established in 1985. It was first produced by the National Wrestling Alliance's (NWA) Jim Crockett Promotions (JCP) and aired on closed-circuit television before becoming a pay-per-view (PPV) event in 1988; JCP was rebranded as World Championship Wrestling (WCW) later that same year. WCW then seceded from the NWA in 1991. The 1999 event was the ninth Great American Bash event promoted by WCW and 13th overall. It took place on June 13, 1999, at the Baltimore Arena in Baltimore, Maryland. This was the seventh Great American Bash held at this venue after the 1988, 1989, 1990, 1991, 1996, and 1998 events. This was also the first PPV event to incorporate WCW's new logo that debuted three months prior.

=== Storylines ===
The event featured professional wrestling matches that involve different wrestlers from pre-existing scripted feuds and storylines. Professional wrestlers portray villains, heroes, or less distinguishable characters in the scripted events that build tension and culminate in a wrestling match or series of matches.

== Event ==
Other on-screen personnel
| Role: | Name: |
|---|---|
| Commentators | Tony Schiavone |
| Commentators | Bobby Heenan |
| Commentators | Mike Tenay |
| Interviewer | Gene Okerlund |
| Ring announcers | Michael Buffer |
| Ring announcers | David Penzer |
| Referees | Randy Anderson |
| Referees | Johnny Boone |
| Referees | Mickie Jay |
| Referees | Nick Patrick |
| Referees | Billy Silverman |

Hak pinned Brian Knobs after Jimmy Hart accidentally hit Knobs with a steel chair. Knobs was then hit with a kendo stick by Hak. After the match, Hugh Morrus came out and attacked Hak. Roddy Piper was disqualified when Buff Bagwell came out and attacked Ric Flair; as per a prematch stipulation Flair regained the presidency of WCW that he had lost to Piper at Slamboree the previous month. After the match, Piper helped Flair and Arn Anderson to attack Bagwell. Rick Steiner won the match after Sting was attacked backstage by dogs, and Rick forced the referee to declare him the winner. Randy Savage was disqualified after Sid Vicious, making his surprise return to WCW, interfered and attacked Kevin Nash with a powerbomb.

== Reception ==
In 2013, Dylan Diot of 411Mania gave the event a rating of 3.0 [Bad], stating, "WCW was in a bad place at the time. They were becoming a cheap rip-off of both WWF and even ECW, and they were going nowhere fast. The booking of the show was horrendous; seven [of] the matches involved interference and there were some mind-boggling stupid finishes throughout the show. Avoid this show at all costs; it's not worth it."

== Results ==
| No. | Results | Stipulations | Times |
|---|---|---|---|
| 1 | Hak (with Chastity) defeated Brian Knobbs (with Jimmy Hart) by pinfall | Hardcore match | 05:41 |
| 2 | Van Hammer defeated Mikey Whipwreck by pinfall | Singles match | 08:35 |
| 3 | Buff Bagwell defeated Disco Inferno by pinfall | Singles match | 10:33 |
| 4 | The No Limit Soldiers (Konnan and Rey Misterio Jr.) defeated The West Texas Rednecks (Curt Hennig and Bobby Duncum Jr.) by pinfall | Tag team match | 10:44 |
| 5 | Ernest Miller (with Sonny Onoo) defeated Horace Hogan by pinfall | Singles match | 05:10 |
| 6 | Ric Flair (with Arn Anderson and Asya) defeated Roddy Piper by disqualification | Singles match | 08:16 |
| 7 | Rick Steiner defeated Sting by pinfall | Falls Count Anywhere match | 10:35 |
| 8 | The Jersey Triad (Diamond Dallas Page and Chris Kanyon) (with Bam Bam Bigelow) defeated Chris Benoit and Perry Saturn (c) by pinfall | Tag team match for the WCW World Tag Team Championship | 19:13 |
| 9 | Kevin Nash (c) defeated Randy Savage (with Team Madness) by disqualification | Singles match for the WCW World Heavyweight Championship | 07:29 |
(c) / – the champion(s) heading into the match
