= The Great American Bash (1998) =

World Championship Wrestling pay-per-view event

- Promotional poster
- Promotion: World Championship Wrestling
- Brand(s): WCW nWo
- Date: June 14, 1998
- City: Baltimore, Maryland
- Venue: Baltimore Arena
- Attendance: 12,810
- Buy rate: 290,000
- Tagline: Baseball, Hot Dogs & Apple Pie. Tradition Bites! The New American Pastime!

Pay-per-view chronology
← Previous; Slamboree	Next → Bash at the Beach

The Great American Bash chronology
← Previous; 1997	Next → 1999

The 1998 Great American Bash was the eighth Great American Bash professional wrestling pay-per-view event produced by World Championship Wrestling (WCW), and 12th Great American Bash event overall. It took place on June 14, 1998, at the Baltimore Arena in Baltimore, Maryland. This was the sixth Great American Bash held at this venue after the 1988, 1989, 1990, 1991, and 1996 events.

Ten matches were contested at the event. In the main event, Sting defeated The Giant to gain control of the WCW World Tag Team Championships. In other prominent matches, Roddy Piper defeated Randy Savage in an impromptu bout after losing to Hollywood Hogan and Bret Hart, Goldberg defeated Konnan to retain the WCW United States Heavyweight Championship, and Booker T defeated Fit Finlay to win the WCW World Television Championship, after defeating Chris Benoit in the final match of their best of seven series in the opening bout to earn the opportunity.

== Production ==
=== Background ===
The Great American Bash is a professional wrestling event established in 1985. It was first produced by the National Wrestling Alliance's (NWA) Jim Crockett Promotions (JCP) and aired on closed-circuit television before becoming a pay-per-view event in 1988; JCP was rebranded as World Championship Wrestling (WCW) later that same year. WCW then seceded from the NWA in 1991. The 1998 event was the eighth Great American Bash event promoted by WCW and 12th overall. It took place on June 14, 1998, at the Baltimore Arena in Baltimore, Maryland. This was the sixth Great American Bash held at this venue after the 1988, 1989, 1990, 1991, and 1996 events.

=== Storylines ===
The event featured professional wrestling matches that involve different wrestlers from pre-existing scripted feuds and storylines. Professional wrestlers portray villains, heroes, or less distinguishable characters in the scripted events that build tension and culminate in a wrestling match or series of matches.

For several weeks leading up to the event, Booker T and Chris Benoit had been battling each other to determine the #1 contender for the WCW World Television Championship, which Booker lost to Fit Finlay on the May 4, 1998 edition of WCW Monday Nitro after Benoit distracted him. Shortly after, the two began a best-of-seven series of matches, six of which had already taken place. With the series even at three wins apiece, the seventh and decisive match would take place at the Bash. The winner of the match, and thus the series, would advance to face Finlay for the title later in the event.

Another feud leading into the event involved Dean Malenko and Chris Jericho over the WCW Cruiserweight Championship. Malenko and Jericho had been feuding since shortly after Jericho won the championship, with Jericho constantly mocking his opponent's ability and family. Jericho defeated Malenko several times in the early part of 1998, but Malenko got his revenge at Slamboree in May when he won a battle royal dressed as Mexican wrestler Ciclope, then unmasked and defeated Jericho immediately afterward. WCW, however, disallowed the title change due to Malenko's deception and held the championship up, with a rematch between the two to determine a new champion signed for the Bash.

=== Main event ===
The main event of the program was to settle a dispute over the WCW World Tag Team Championship, which had become interlaced with the rivalry between the now-divided New World Order. Entering Slamboree, the reigning tag team champions were Scott Hall and Kevin Nash, The Outsiders. They had signed to defend their championships against the team of Sting and The Giant, who at the time of the signing were both representatives of WCW. After April's Spring Stampede, the nWo split into separate factions led by Nash, known as the Wolfpac, and Hollywood Hogan, who renamed his side nWo Hollywood.

Shortly before Slamboree, Hogan convinced Giant, a former member of the nWo, to rejoin the group on his side. Then, during the match, Hall turned on Nash and gave the titles to the challengers, who were now on opposite sides as Sting was still a WCW loyalist; he would later join with Nash to become part of the Wolfpac. Despite being champions, Sting and Giant did not wrestle together after winning the titles and chose instead to make defenses with their own stablemates. Eventually a match was agreed to where the winner would receive both belts and would be able to select a replacement partner to continue the reign.

== Events ==
Other on-screen personnel
Role:	Name:
Commentators	Tony Schiavone
Commentators	Bobby Heenan
Commentators	Mike Tenay
Interviewer	Gene Okerlund
Ring announcer	David Penzer
Ring announcer	Michael Buffer
Referees	Scott Dickinson
Referees	Mickie Jay
Referees	Nick Patrick
Referees	Charles Robinson
Referees	Billy Silverman
Referees	Mark Curtis

The opening match was the final match of the Booker T and Chris Benoit best of seven series to determine who would face Fit Finlay later that evening for the WCW World Television Championship. Booker T ultimately picked up the victory following two Harlem Sidekicks.

Before the next match, someone entered the arena dressed as Mortis. During the match between Kanyon and Saturn, two men entered fighting, both dressed as Mortis distracting Saturn. This enabled Kanyon to hit the Flatliner on Saturn and pick up the victory. One of the men who were dressed as Mortis entered the ring and celebrated with Kanyon, however he turned on him and hit him with a DDT, before removing his mask and revealing himself to be Raven. Raven was then joined by Kidman, Horace, Lodi, and Riggs, who all beat up Saturn.

The next match was for the rematch for the WCW Cruiserweight Championship between Dean Malenko and Chris Jericho. During the match Jericho grabbed the mic and started making comments about Malenko's dead father. Malenko lost his temper and began beating Jericho with a chair. Eventually Malenko's assault on Jericho continued to the back and all the way to the parking lot. Jericho ran across the street in order to seek cover in a building there. Following the match no new champion was officially declared and Tony Schiavone told everyone to tune into Monday Nitro the next night to find out what was happening with the title.

The following match saw Juventud Guerrera defeat Reese after a hurricanrana. This was followed by Chavo Guerrero Jr. defeating Eddie Guerrero following a springboard DDT. Booker T next received his Television Championship opportunity and recaptured the title with a victory over Finlay.

The WCW United States Heavyweight Championship match was next which saw Goldberg defend his title against Konnan. Goldberg defeated Konnan quickly, which brought his undefeated streak to 100–0. Curt Hennig and Rick Rude, who had been in Konnan's corner, helped him to his feet and then turned on him and began attacking him. Kevin Nash and Lex Luger came out to help Konnan, and Hennig took off his nWo Wolfpac shirt to reveal an nWo Hollywood shirt underneath.

The next match saw Hollywood Hogan and Bret Hart take on Roddy Piper and Randy Savage, and should Hogan and Hart win, Piper and Savage would need to wrestle afterward. Throughout the match, Hogan continually used the ringpost to work on Savage's knee. Ultimately Hart got the sharpshooter on Savage, to which Savage submitted. Gene Okerlund came out to interview Piper about Savage's bad knee and their upcoming match. As Piper helped Savage up, Savage attacked Piper and the bell rang to begin their match. Piper, however, quickly got a figure-4 leglock on Savage to which Savage again submitted.

The final match was a singles match to determine who would control the WCW World Tag Team Championship. The match ended after Sting hit a third reverse DDT on the Giant, after he kicked out of the first two. Sting left the arena with both belts, and Sting and Nash were declared the champions.

== Aftermath ==
The following night on Nitro, Jericho was awarded the WCW Cruiserweight Championship due to his victory the night before.

== Reception ==
In 2015, Kevin Pantoja of 411Mania gave the event a rating of 5.0 [Not So Good], stating, "The first half of this Pay-Per-View is a surprising treat. I’ve never given out three near four star ratings on a WCW show and I did it in the first three matches here. The Guerrero match is a solid one too. Besides that though, everything else is either mildly disappointing (Booker/Finlay) or just flat out bad. The top of the card in WCW sucked and it showed here. Recommended show turn this off before the US Title match and you’ll be glad though at least the worst stuff is relatively short."

== Results ==
No.	Results	Stipulations	Times
1	Booker T defeated Chris Benoit by pinfall	Singles match to determine the #1 contender for the WCW World Television Championship; Final match in the best of seven series	16:20
2	Kanyon defeated Saturn by pinfall	Singles match	14:46
3	Chris Jericho defeated Dean Malenko by disqualification	Singles match for the vacant WCW Cruiserweight Championship	13:52
4	Juventud Guerrera defeated Reese (with Lodi) by pinfall	Singles match	08:45
5	Chavo Guerrero Jr. defeated Eddie Guerrero by pinfall	Singles match	14:46
6	Booker T defeated Fit Finlay (c) by pinfall	Singles match for the WCW World Television Championship	13:13
7	Goldberg (c) defeated Konnan (with Rick Rude and Curt Hennig) by pinfall	Singles match for the WCW United States Heavyweight Championship	01:57
8	Hollywood Hogan and Bret Hart (with The Disciple) defeated Roddy Piper and Randy Savage by submission	Tag team match	11:40
9	Roddy Piper defeated Randy Savage by submission	Singles match	01:37
10	Sting defeated The Giant by pinfall	Singles match for control of the WCW World Tag Team Championships	06:40
(c) / – the champion(s) heading into the match
