= Bobby Bold Eagle (disambiguation) =

Bobby Bold Eagle (born 1948) is a retired American professional wrestler, and trainer.

Bobby Bold Eagle may also refer to:

- Bob Boyer, Canadian professional wrestler
- Joe Gomez (wrestler) (born 1973), American professional wrestler
