= The Great American Bash (1996) =

World Championship Wrestling pay-per-view event

- Promotional poster featuring Mean Gene Okerlund and Bobby "The Brain" Heenan
- Promotion: World Championship Wrestling
- Date: June 16, 1996
- City: Baltimore, Maryland
- Venue: Baltimore Arena
- Attendance: 9,000
- Buy rate: 170,000
- Tagline: World Championship Wrestling Turns Up The Heat!

Pay-per-view chronology
← Previous; Slamboree	Next → Bash at the Beach

The Great American Bash chronology
← Previous; 1995	Next → 1997

The 1996 Great American Bash was a professional wrestling pay-per-view event produced by World Championship Wrestling (WCW). It was the sixth Great American Bash under the WCW banner and 10th Great American Bash event overall. It took place on June 16, 1996, at the Baltimore Arena in Baltimore, Maryland. This was the fifth Great American Bash held at this venue after the 1988, 1989, 1990, and 1991 events.

Twelve matches were contested at the event. In the main event, The Giant defeated Lex Luger to retain the WCW World Heavyweight Championship. In other prominent matches, Ric Flair and Arn Anderson defeated Kevin Greene and Steve McMichael (who made their WCW in-ring debuts), Chris Benoit defeated Kevin Sullivan in a Falls Count Anywhere match, and Dean Malenko successfully retained his WCW Cruiserweight Championship against Rey Misterio Jr. (also making his WCW debut).

== Production ==
=== Background ===
The Great American Bash is a professional wrestling event established in 1985. It was first produced by the National Wrestling Alliance's (NWA) Jim Crockett Promotions (JCP) and aired on closed-circuit television before becoming a pay-per-view event in 1988; JCP was rebranded as World Championship Wrestling (WCW) later that same year. WCW then seceded from the NWA in 1991. The 1996 event was the sixth Great American Bash event promoted by WCW and 10th overall. It took place on June 16, 1996, at the Baltimore Arena in Baltimore, Maryland. This was the fifth Great American Bash held at this venue after the 1988, 1989, 1990, and 1991 events.

=== Storylines ===
The event featured professional wrestling matches that involve different wrestlers from pre-existing scripted feuds and storylines. Professional wrestlers portray villains, heroes, or less distinguishable characters in the scripted events that build tension and culminate in a wrestling match or series of matches.

== Event ==
Other on-screen personnel
Role:	Name:
Commentators	Tony Schiavone
Commentators	Dusty Rhodes
Commentators	Mike Tenay
Interviewer	Gene Okerlund
Ring announcers	David Penzer
Ring announcers	Michael Buffer
Referees	Randy Anderson
Referees	Randy Eller
Referees	Nick Patrick

Prior to the start of the pay-per-view, there were three matches held on Main Event. The first match saw Rocco Rock make quick work of Jerry Sags. The second match saw V.K. Wallstreet defeat Jim Powers after a Samoan Drop. The final match saw Jim Duggan pin Disco Inferno following a running clothesline.

The Steiner Brothers (Rick Steiner and Scott Steiner) defeated Fire and Ice (Scott Norton and Ice Train) in the first match of the pay-per-view. The Steiner Brothers hit a Frankensteiner followed by a bulldog, which enable Scott to pick up the pinfall victory on Norton.

The second match was for the WCW United States Heavyweight Championship. This match saw Konnan retain the title by defeating El Gato, after hitting him with a spinebuster.

The next match saw Diamond Dallas Page defeat Marcus Alexander Bagwell. Bagwell went for a fisherman’s suplex that Page countered into a Diamond Cutter.

During the next match for the WCW Cruiserweight Championship, Dean Malenko retained his title in a match against a debuting Rey Misterio Jr. When Misterio went for a hurricanrana, Malenko countered into a powerbomb and used the middle rope for leverage to pick up the pinfall victory.

The next match saw John Tenta defeated Big Bubba Rogers. After Rogers attempted to hit Tenta off the top rope, Tenta powerbombed Bubba and covered him for the win. After the match Tenta cut Rogers' goatee off with a pair of scissors.

The next match was a Falls Count Anywhere match between Chris Benoit and Kevin Sullivan. The match ended when Benoit superplexed Sullivan from a table that head been set up on the ropes in the corner. After the match Arn Anderson came to the ring and helped Benoit attack Sullivan.

Sting next took on Lord Steven Regal, and picked up the victory via submission to the Scorpion Deathlock. After this match an announcement was made that Randy Savage was reinstated into WCW and would return the next night on Monday Nitro.

The second to last match was a tag team match between Ric Flair and Arn Anderson, against Kevin Greene and Steve McMichael. While Flair had the figure-4 leglock on Greene, his partner McMichael turned his back on him, and hit him with a briefcase full of money, which enables Flair to pin Green. Debra McMichael had chased Woman and Elizabeth to the back, only to return with the briefcase containing money and a Four Horsemen T-shirt. After the match, McMichael put on a The Four Horsemen shirt, officially joining the group, giving him Brian Pillman's spot in the Horsemen. Chris Benoit then came out and the Horsemen attacked Greene and Savage.

Eric Bischoff interviewed Kevin Nash and Scott Hall and after the interview, Nash and Hall powerbombed Bischoff through a table.

The main event was for the WCW World Heavyweight Championship saw the champion The Giant retain his title against Lex Luger. During the match, Jimmy Hart used his megaphone as a weapon on Luger, which brought Sting out who chased Hart to the back. The match ended when Luger attempted to use the Torture Rack, however he was unable to support him and collapsed. Giant used this opening to choke slam Luger and pick up the victory.

== Results ==
No.	Results	Stipulations	Times
1^{ME}	Rocco Rock defeated Jerry Sags	Singles match	01:46
2^{ME}	V.K. Wallstreet defeated Jim Powers	Singles match	03:07
3^{ME}	Jim Duggan defeated Disco Inferno	Singles match	02:09
4	The Steiner Brothers (Rick and Scott) defeated Fire and Ice (Scott Norton and Ice Train)	Tag team match	10:29
5	Konnan (c) defeated El Gato	Singles match for the WCW United States Heavyweight Championship	06:03
6	Diamond Dallas Page defeated Marcus Alexander Bagwell	Singles match	09:39
7	Dean Malenko (c) defeated Rey Misterio Jr.	Singles match for the WCW Cruiserweight Championship	17:50
8	John Tenta defeated Big Bubba Rogers (with Jimmy Hart)	Singles match	05:24
9	Chris Benoit defeated Kevin Sullivan (with Jimmy Hart)	Falls Count Anywhere match	09:58
10	Sting defeated Lord Steven Regal (with Jeeves) by submission	Singles match	16:30
11	Ric Flair and Arn Anderson (with Woman, Miss Elizabeth and Bobby Heenan) defeated Kevin Greene and Steve McMichael (with Randy Savage, Debra and Tara Greene)	Tag team match	20:51
12	The Giant (c) (with Jimmy Hart) defeated Lex Luger	Singles match for the WCW World Heavyweight Championship	09:21
(c) / – the champion(s) heading into the match; ME / – the match was broadcast prior to the pay-per-view on Main Event
