= Jersey Triad =

Professional wrestling stable

Tag team
- Members: Diamond Dallas Page; Chris Kanyon; Bam Bam Bigelow
- Billed heights: 6 ft 4 in (1.93 m) - DDP; 6 ft 4 in (1.93 m) - Kanyon; 6 ft 4 in (1.93 m) - Bigelow
- Billed from: New Jersey
- Debut: May 1999
- Disbanded: September 1999
- Years active: 1999, 2001

The Jersey Triad was a triumvirate stable active in World Championship Wrestling (WCW) from mid-to-late 1999. The group consisted of Diamond Dallas Page, Chris Kanyon and Bam Bam Bigelow. Their name came from the members being billed from New Jersey (although Kanyon was actually from New York).

== History ==
=== Formation ===
Shortly after Slamboree in May 1999, Diamond Dallas Page formed an alliance with fellow New Jerseyan Bam Bam Bigelow and began feuding with Perry Saturn and Raven for the WCW World Tag Team Championship.

On the May 31, 1999 episode of Nitro, Page and Bigelow sent Raven to the hospital after a severe beating, leaving Saturn alone to defend the Tag Team Titles, which Page and Bigelow won later that night with help from Chris Kanyon replacing Raven in the match however he cost the team the championships after Page pinned him.

Page, Bigelow, and Kanyon became known as the Jersey Triad after Kanyon officially joined them on the June 7, 1999 episode of Nitro, when he turned on Saturn after Chris Benoit and Saturn defeated Page and Bigelow for the titles.

The Triad regained the belts six days later at The Great American Bash on June 13, 1999, after Kanyon pinned Benoit.

=== "Freebird Rule" ===
Due to an affiliation with then "WCW President for Life" Ric Flair, the Triad was permitted to defend these titles in any way possible using the Freebird Rule- any two of the three wrestlers could defend the tag team titles at any time. This even saw the Triad switching members during a title defense, the rule being one member had to be on the floor at all times.

On July 11, 1999, at Bash at the Beach, the Jersey Triad defeated Benoit and Saturn again to retain their Tag Team Titles.

The team held the titles until Road Wild where Kanyon and Bigelow would lose them to Harlem Heat on August 14, 1999. In the same night Chris Benoit defeated Diamond Dallas Page to retain his WCW United States Championship, despite interference from Kanyon and Bigelow

=== Break up and aftermath ===
The group broke up shortly after Fall Brawl in September 1999, after Goldberg pinned Page. Diamond Dallas Page continued feuding with Hogan again, joining Sid Vicious and Rick Steiner in a team effort to take on Hogan, Sting, and Goldberg. Soon after that feud ended Page turned into a hero again and feuded with both Kanyon and Bigelow before the year ended. Both Page and Bigelow feuded with Kanyon during his Chris "Champagne" Kanyon gimmick.

Page and Kanyon would reunite as a tag team in the World Wrestling Federation (WWF) during the WCW Invasion storyline, as they were both members of the Alliance in 2001. The pair held the WWF Tag Team Championship once.

== Championships and accomplishments ==
- World Championship Wrestling
  - WCW World Tag Team Championship (2 times) - Page and Bigelow (1), all three (1)
- World Wrestling Federation
  - WWF Tag Team Championship (1 time) – Page and Kanyon

== See also ==
- The Diamond Exchange
- The Fabulous Freebirds
- The Insiders (professional wrestling)
- The Triple Threat
