= Chavo Guerrero Jr. =

American professional wrestler (born 1970)

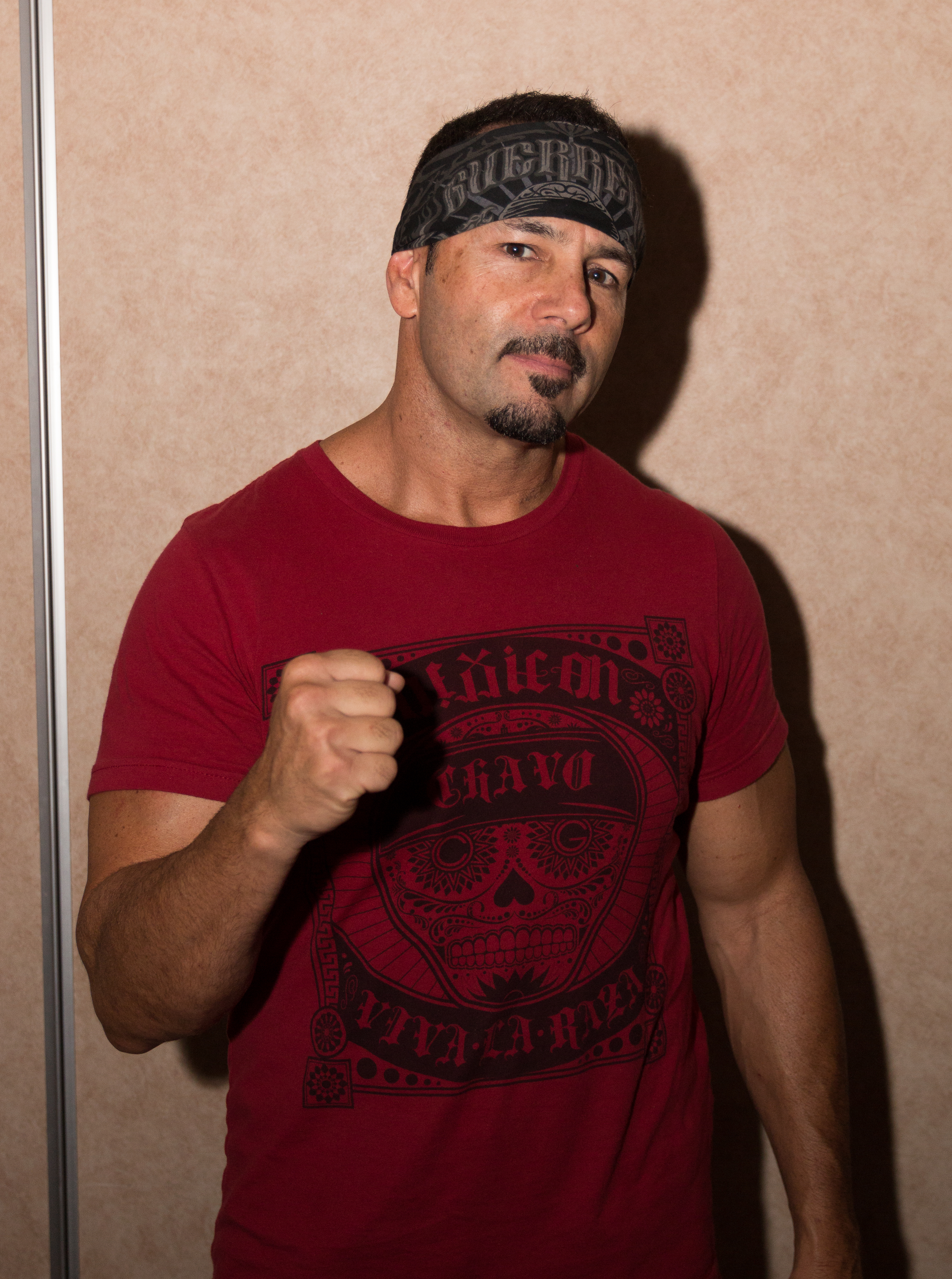
- Guerrero in 2016

Personal information
- Born: Salvador Guerrero IV; October 20, 1970 (age 56) El Paso, Texas, U.S.
- Spouse: Shari Guerrero (m. 1998)
- Children: 2
- Family: Guerrero

Professional wrestling career
- Ring name(s): Chavo Guerrero Jr. Chavo Guerrero; Kerwin White; Lieutenant Loco; The Swagger Soaring Eagle
- Billed height: 5 ft 9 in (175 cm)
- Billed weight: 215 lb (98 kg)
- Billed from: Ciudad Juárez, Chihuahua; El Paso, Texas; Palm Springs, California (as Kerwin White)
- Debut: May 1994

Salvador Guerrero IV (born October 20, 1970), better known by his ring names Chavo Guerrero and Chavo Guerrero Jr., is an American professional wrestler. He is signed to WWE and AAA as a producer. He is best known for his tenures in World Wrestling Federation/Entertainment (WWF/WWE), World Championship Wrestling (WCW), Total Nonstop Action Wrestling (TNA), All Elite Wrestling (AEW), Lucha Underground (LU), Ring of Honor (ROH) and Nación Lucha Libre (NLL).

As a singles wrestler, Guerrero Jr. is a former ECW Champion in WWE, and a six-time Cruiserweight Champion between WWE and WCW. He also achieved success in tag team wrestling, being a five-time world tag team champion – winning the WWE Tag Team Championship twice with his uncle Eddie Guerrero as Los Guerreros, the WCW World Tag Team Championship once with Corporal Cajun as the Misfits in Action, and the TNA World Tag Team Championship twice with Hernandez. Between WCW, WWE, and TNA, he has held a dozen total championships, including one world championship.

== Early life ==
Salvador was born and raised in El Paso, Texas. Guerrero grew up watching wrestling and going to wrestling promotions where he watched his family wrestle. There was also a wrestling ring in the Guerreros' back yard. Chavo played with his uncle Eddie Guerrero constantly in the wrestling ring while practicing moves on each other.

== Professional wrestling career ==
=== Early career (1994–1996) ===
Guerrero made his professional wrestling debut in May 1994 wrestling in Mexico. He toured with New Japan Pro-Wrestling (NJPW) during 1996, featuring mainly on the lower card. Guerrero competed in the Best of the Super Junior IV tournament but did not earn enough points to become the victor.

=== World Championship Wrestling (1996–2001) ===
He joined World Championship Wrestling (WCW) in May 1996. He made his in-ring debut wrestling Steven Regal in a dark match. On July 22—Guerrero's WCW Monday Nitro debut—he lost to Dean Malenko via submission. On August 3, 1996, Guerrero received his first title shot in WCW against Ric Flair on WCW Saturday Night for the WCW United States Championship. Flair beat Guerrero via submission to retain his championship.

Guerrero's first pay-per-view (PPV) appearance was in a dark match loss to Konnan on WCW Hog Wild. Then at WCW WorldWide, on August 11, 1996, he and Eddie Guerrero defeated High Voltage. After a series of singles wins, Guerrero faced Diamond Dallas Page after a short feud on Fall Brawl in a losing effort on September 15.

While in WCW, Chavo shared the limelight with his uncle Eddie, becoming a reluctant ally of his uncle's. As part of their storyline, Eddie continually tried to make Chavo adopt Eddie's cheating tactics, but he often refused to do so. Eventually, Guerrero's treatment at the hands of Eddie would drive him "crazy", and he adopted the gimmick of a psycho fixated with a hobby horse he dubbed "Pepé". This led to a feud with Norman Smiley in which Pepé was thrown into a woodchipper. Another result of his insanity was his inability to join Eddie's Latino World Order stable, which was a take-off of the nWo. On June 14, 1998, Chavo defeated his uncle Eddie at The Great American Bash PPV. In July 1998 at the Bash at the Beach PPV, Guerrero faced Stevie Ray in a "tune up match" before he faced Eddie in a Hair vs Hair match, a match where the winner gets to shave his opponent's hair. Chavo lost via opposum pin and began to shave his own hair off.

On January 17, 1999 at Souled Out, Guerrero was defeated by Norman Smiley in a match that was booked due to Guerrero's companion Pepe being burnt by Smiley, ending the Pepe gimmick.

Guerrero and Billy Kidman tag teamed for a WCW tag team title tournament held on Nitro. Guerrero then turned on Kidman after being eliminated from the tournament, starting a feud. Guerrero faced Kidman for the WCW Cruiserweight Championship on WCW Superbrawl 9 on February 21, 1999, but failed to win the championship.

He was also a member of the comedy stable The Misfits in Action (MIA), consisting of himself, Hugh Morris (better known as Bill DeMott), Lash LeRoux and Van Hammer. They were managed by Major Gunns. Guerrero was billed as "Lieutenant Loco". As Loco, he defeated Daffney for the Cruiserweight Championship in a triangle match also involving Disco Inferno on June 7, 2000 episode of Thunder. On June 11, 2000, at The Great American Bash, Lt. Loco defeated Disco Inferno to retain the title. Loco lost the championship to Lance Storm a month later on Nitro. At WCW Mayhem, Loco left the MIA and reverted to Chavo Guerrero Jr.

Guerrero won the Cruiserweight Championship from Mike Sanders on the December 6 episode of Thunder. He retained the title against Rey Mysterio Jr. on February 18, 2001 at SuperBrawl Revenge. As Cruiserweight Champion, Guerrero engaged in a feud against "Sugar" Shane Helms eventually losing the championship to Helms at Greed.

=== World Wrestling Federation/Entertainment/WWE (2001–2011) ===
==== The Alliance and Los Guerreros (2001–2004) ====
Guerrero's contract with WCW was one of the twenty-five contracts that were included in WCW's sale to the World Wrestling Federation (WWF) in March 2001. Like most of the wrestling talent that came over with WCW, Guerrero wrestled as a heel under the WCW banner as his WWF debut was as part of The Alliance, a group of WCW and ECW employees who had, in storyline, invaded the WWF after their promotion was bought out. He made his debut in his first televised match in a winning effort against Essa Rios on WWF Jakked on July 16, 2001. On April 13, 2002, Guerrero faced Billy Kidman on an episode of WWF Metal for the Cruiserweight Championship and lost the match via pinfall. Guerrero spent time as an undercard wrestler in the company, which was soon rebranded World Wrestling Entertainment, wrestling for the WWE Cruiserweight Championship on numerous occasions.

Soon after returning to the active roster, Guerrero was aligned with his uncle Eddie, forming the tag team Los Guerreros. In contrast to his previous WCW storyline with his uncle, Guerrero fully adopted his uncle's policy of "Lie, Cheat and Steal" to win matches as part of the gimmick. Los Guerreros won the tag team championships at Survivor Series on November 17, when they defeated Kurt Angle and Chris Benoit and Edge and Rey Mysterio in a Triple threat tag team elimination match. The duo turned face due to their popularity. On the February 6, 2003 episode of SmackDown!, Los Guerreros lost the WWE Tag Team Championship to Team Angle. At WrestleMania XIX on March 30, they were again defeated by Team Angle in a triple threat match for the tag team titles, also involving the team of Benoit and Rhyno. They continued to feud with Team Angle and won the championships back on the September 18 episode of SmackDown!. One month later, they lost the titles to Basham Brothers on the October 23 episode of SmackDown!. After losing their WWE Tag Team Championship, Guerrero became jealous of his uncle's growing popularity and WWE Championship ambitions, and on the January 8, 2004 episode of SmackDown!, Chavo attacked Eddie after losing to the Basham Brothers in a rematch for the WWE Tag Team Championship and broke from the team, thus turning heel once again. He was soon joined by his father Chavo Sr. who sided with his son instead of his brother. Guerrero and his father teamed together to defeat Eddie and Kurt Angle on the January 22 episode of SmackDown! Eddie, however, defeated Guerrero at the Royal Rumble on January 25 to end their feud.

==== Cruiserweight Champion and Kerwin White (2004–2005) ====
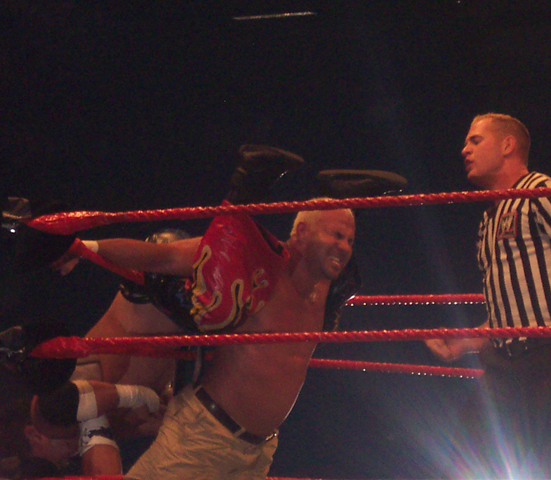
Chavo as Kerwin White vs Tajiri

At No Way Out on February 15, Guerrero defeated Rey Mysterio to win the WWE Cruiserweight Championship, following interference from his father (now known as Chavo Classic). At WrestleMania XX on March 14, Guerrero successfully defended his title in a 10-man Cruiserweight Open by last eliminating Mysterio. In the following weeks, Guerrero defeated Mysterio, Funaki, Ultimo Dragon, Spike Dudley, Jamie Noble, Nunzio in one-on-one title matches. On the May 6 episode of SmackDown!, Guerrero issued an open challenge for anyone he had not yet defeated to face him for his title. The challenge was answered by Jacqueline, who defeated Guerrero for the title after she gave him a "low blow". He regained the title at Judgment Day on May 16. Guerrero then dropped the title on the May 20 episode of SmackDown! to his father, who "accidentally" pinned his son in a Triple Threat match which also involved Spike Dudley. Rey Mysterio later regained the title, and he and Chavo faced each other at The Great American Bash on June 27, however Mysterio won the match.

On the August 26 episode of SmackDown!, Guerrero suffered a legitimate concussion due to Billy Kidman's shooting star press and had to be taken to the hospital. Guerrero returned as a face on the October 21 episode of SmackDown!, exacting revenge from Kidman, who had turned heel as a result of the injury to Guerrero. Shortly after his feud with Kidman ended, Guerrero returned to his heel persona after receiving a negative reaction while facing then-cruiserweight champion Funaki in a losing effort during a SmackDown! show in Japan. Guerrero went on to win the Cruiserweight Championship once again at No Way Out on February 20, 2005, after eliminating Paul London in a six-way cruiserweight gauntlet match. He lost the title to London in a battle royal on the March 31 episode of SmackDown!; Guerrero was the first person eliminated from the battle royal when everyone else in the match ganged up to throw him out right at the beginning.

In June, Guerrero became one of the last minute trades in the 2005 WWE Draft, which saw him jump from SmackDown! to the Raw brand. The next week, on the July 4 episode of Raw, he denounced his Hispanic heritage in favor of the "Anglo-American way". This came after two weeks of being battered by the Mexican faction, the Mexicools. It led to the changing of his persona to "Kerwin White", a stereotypical, middle-class, white, conservative, Anglo-American man. He dyed his hair blond and often drove a golf cart to the ring which held his golf clubs. Soon after his debut, White started making suggestive remarks towards African Americans, Hispanics, Asian Americans, Native Americans, and other non-White people, specifically directed towards Shelton Benjamin. On the September 5 episode of Raw, White cost Benjamin a match against Rob Conway. Benjamin defeated White by disqualification the following week when White attacked him with his golf club. At Unforgiven on September 18, White was beaten by Benjamin. White then hired Nick Nemeth on the September 26 episode of Raw as his new "caddie" to help him in his matches. Reflecting on the Kerwin White character during an interview with Chris Van Vliet in 2020, Guerrero recalled how he pitched being dressed as a member of the Ku Klux Klan on TV to get maximum heat while explaining how his gimmick got people of all races to hate him by saying:

I told Vince, at the end of the day I want to come out in a white sheet. He was like "ohh yes I love it". Now, we never ended up doing that. It got too risque, a little too racist for a network. [...] I wanted to, absolutely. I grew up in the time of wrestling where the more heat the better. I wanted to fight my way back to the dressing room everynight. I wanted to have to sneak out the back window. I wanted to be in the streets and people yell "we hate you" because that's heat... If I was going to do it, I was going to do it 100%, like I'd do anything. We never got to that point, but I was ready. I would have.

==== Aftermath of Eddie Guerrero's death and feud with Rey Mysterio (2005–2007) ====
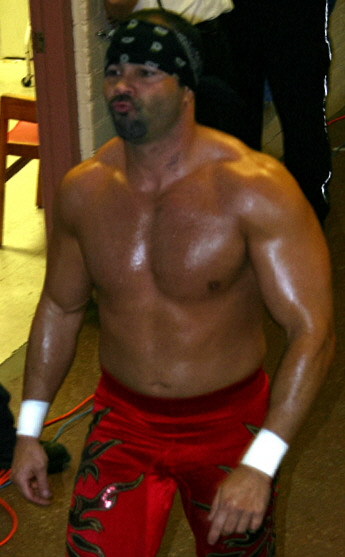
Guerrero makes his entrance at a WWE house show in Canada.

On the morning of November 13, Guerrero checked into the same hotel as his uncle, Eddie, in Minneapolis, Minnesota. Guerrero was alerted by hotel security that Eddie did not respond to a wake-up call and upon opening the locked door to the room, Guerrero found his uncle unconscious. Guerrero attempted CPR but Eddie was declared dead when paramedics arrived on the scene. Later that afternoon, Guerrero appeared at a press conference with WWE chairman Vince McMahon to address Eddie's death. These events resulted in Guerrero dropping the Kerwin White gimmick and wrestling under his real name as a face. He defeated John "Bradshaw" Layfield (JBL) on the November 18 episode of SmackDown!, using the "Three Amigos" triple suplexes and the Frog Splash in tribute to Eddie. He also used the cheating tactic, "playing possum", which Eddie made famous; behind the back of the distracted referee, Guerrero gently tossed a steel chair to a dazed JBL while Guerrero laid down, pretending to have been hit. The referee then turned and, seeing the "unconscious" Guerrero, almost disqualified the oblivious, chair-wielding JBL but stopped short so the tribute-style match could continue.

On the February 24, 2006 episode of SmackDown!, Guerrero attacked Randy Orton when Orton began to insult Eddie and the heritage of the Guerreros. Guerrero was soon dragged out by security. On the February 27 episode of Raw, Guerrero faced off against Shelton Benjamin in a qualifying match for the Money in the Bank ladder match at WrestleMania 22 on April 2. During the match, Orton interfered and hit Guerrero with the RKO, allowing Benjamin to get the pinfall victory. He proceeded to unsuccessfully challenge Benjamin for the WWE Intercontinental Championship on the April 3 episode of Raw. In a segment that aired on WWE Unlimited, an emotional Guerrero decided to quit WWE, in storyline, after believing he had let his family, Eddie, and the fans down and expressed his doubts about being a wrestler.

Guerrero appeared at Judgment Day on May 21 to support Rey Mysterio. At The Great American Bash on July 23, Guerrero interfered in Mysterio's World Heavyweight Championship match, seemingly to help Mysterio. Guerrero, however, hit Mysterio with a steel chair, which allowed challenger King Booker to win the match and the title, turning heel once again. On the August 4 episode of SmackDown!, Guerrero accused Mysterio of using Eddie's name to succeed, claiming that he had disrespected Eddie's memory. Guerrero went on to defeat Mysterio at SummerSlam on August 20 after Vickie Guerrero (Eddie's widow) accidentally knocked Mysterio off the top turnbuckle. On the August 25 episode of SmackDown!, Vickie came down to the ring to apologize to Mysterio and Guerrero but turned on Mysterio by hitting him in the back with a steel chair. The following week on SmackDown!, Vickie announced herself as Guerrero's new manager. Mysterio gained his revenge on Guerrero by defeating him in a Falls Count Anywhere match at No Mercy on October 8. Guerrero eventually challenged Mysterio to an "I Quit" match on the October 20 episode of SmackDown!, which Guerrero won after injuring Mysterio's knee.

A week later, Chris Benoit, another old friend of Eddie's, began feuding with Guerrero and Vickie, and the men would have numerous confrontations over the following weeks. Benoit defeated Guerrero to retain the WWE United States Championship at Survivor Series on November 26. After weeks of continued interaction, the two faced off in a United States Championship rematch at Armageddon on December 17 that Guerrero lost when he tapped out to a Sharpshooter. Guerrero got yet another rematch the following Friday, losing the match after Vickie hit Benoit with the title belt. Guerrero snapped after the match, knocking over Vickie and attacking Benoit. The feud concluded with Benoit forcing Guerrero to submit in a No Disqualification match.

At No Way Out on February 18, 2007, Guerrero won a Cruiserweight Open Match when he pinned Jimmy Wang Yang, thus winning the Cruiserweight Championship from Gregory Helms. On June 24, Guerrero retained his title against Wang Yang at Vengeance: Night of Champions. At The Great American Bash on July 22, he lost the Cruiserweight Championship to Hornswoggle in another Cruiserweight Open when Hornswoggle pinned Jamie Noble.

Guerrero then turned his attention to Rey Mysterio, whom he had put out of action, in storyline, in 2006. Before Mysterio's return at SummerSlam on August 26, Guerrero mocked Mysterio's knee injury and taunted him during matches. He was, however, unable to defeat Mysterio at SummerSlam. On the September 7 episode of SmackDown!, Guerrero then lost an "I Quit" rematch to Mysterio, after Mysterio assaulted his left knee with a steel chair. This allowed Guerrero to have time off to serve his suspension for violating the WWE Wellness Policy.

==== ECW Champion and La Familia (2007–2009) ====
Guerrero remained inactive until the December 18 episode of ECW, where he appeared after the main event between WWE United States Champion Montel Vontavious Porter and ECW Champion CM Punk and attacked the vulnerable Punk, sending a message that he wanted a title shot. Guerrero challenged Punk to several matches until he finally won the third on the January 15, 2008 episode of ECW after interference from World Heavyweight Champion Edge to earn a championship match. On the January 22 episode of ECW, Guerrero defeated Punk in a No Disqualification match to win the ECW Championship following interference from Edge. In the process he proclaimed Edge and company as his "familia". He then successfully defended his title against Punk at No Way Out on February 17 and on March 4 episode of ECW.

At WrestleMania XXIV on March 30, Guerrero lost the ECW Championship to Kane in a record eleven seconds. Shortly afterward, Bam Neely debuted to act as his bodyguard. Guerrero lost a rematch against Kane at Backlash on April 27 and also failed to become the number one contender at One Night Stand on June 1. After Edge turned on La Familia, Guerrero returned to singles and tag team action with Neely. He also failed to regain the ECW Championship at Unforgiven on September 7 in a Championship Scramble match, and later against champion Matt Hardy.

Guerrero was drafted to the Raw brand as part of the 2009 Supplemental Draft. He then became involved in the feud between Vickie Guerrero and Santino Marella. At Extreme Rules on June 7, 2009, Guerrero and Vickie were defeated by Marella in a Hog Pen match. Upon Vickie's departure from WWE, Guerrero continued to feud with Marella and defeated him on the June 18 episode of WWE Superstars. Guerrero next feuded with Hornswoggle, where the two faced off in various types of matches (in which a handicap of some sort was imposed on Guerrero by the various celebrity guests left in charge of Raw every week) with Hornswoggle gaining the wins. Guerrero finally picked up a win when he teamed with Chris Masters to defeat Hornswoggle and Santino Marella in a tag team match on the September 28 episode of Raw.

==== Final storylines and departure (2010–2011) ====
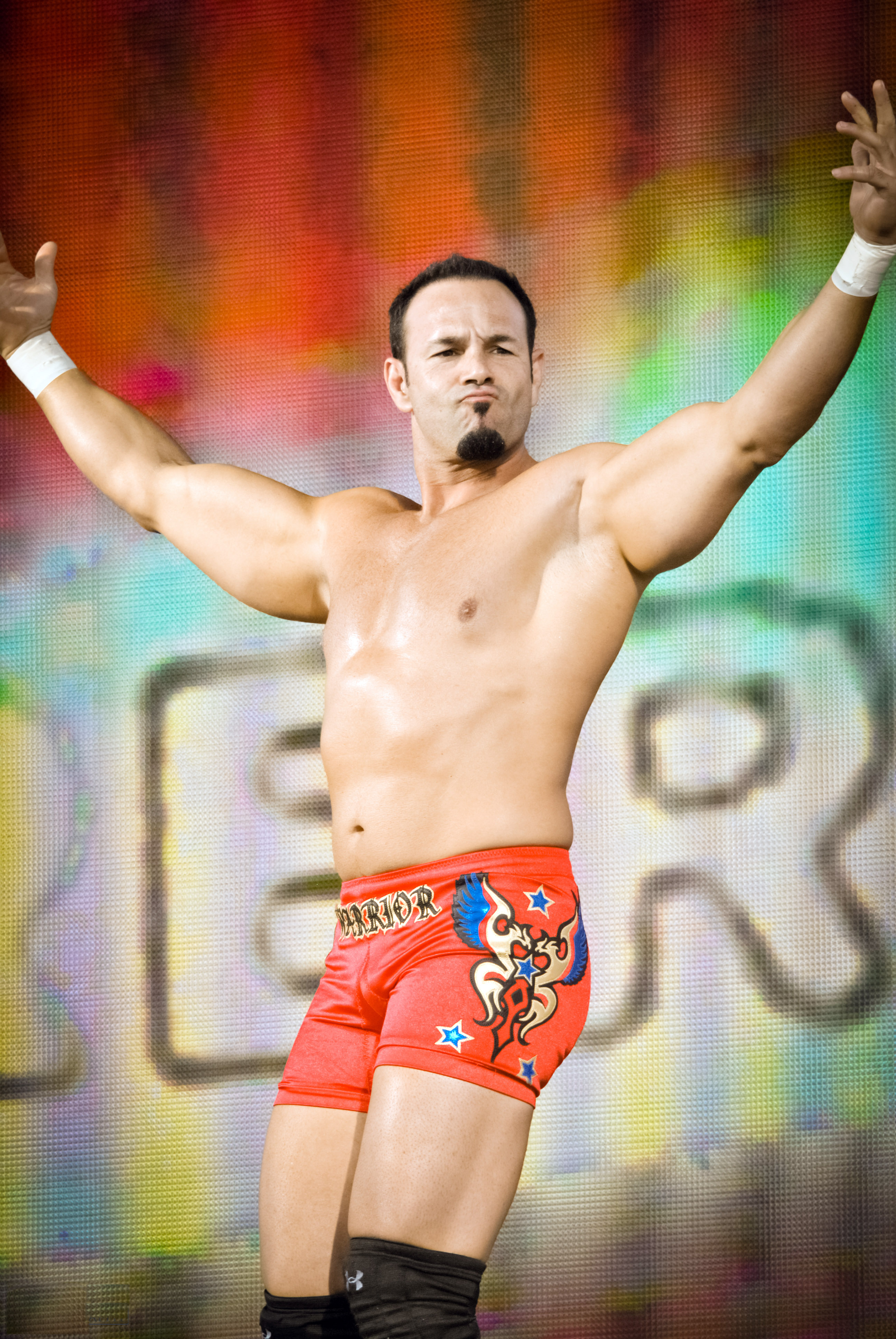
Guerrero in 2010

As part of the 2010 WWE Supplemental Draft, Guerrero was drafted back to the SmackDown brand. He started an alliance with Dolph Ziggler, and the duo defeated Christian in a handicap match. On the July 9, 2010 episode of SmackDown, Guerrero competed in a triple threat Money in the Bank qualifying match, along with Ziggler and MVP. Throughout the match, it became apparent that Vickie Guerrero (Ziggler's manager) had told Guerrero and Ziggler to work together to ensure Ziggler qualified for the match. During the match, however, when both MVP and Ziggler were down, Guerrero attempted to pin MVP to win the match himself, turning his back on Vickie and Ziggler, thus ending the alliance.

On March 8, 2011, Guerrero was announced as a NXT Pro to Darren Young for the fifth season of NXT. On the May 6 episode of SmackDown, Guerrero commentated on a match between Tyson Kidd and Sin Cara, which Sin Cara won. On the May 13 episode of SmackDown, Guerrero aided Sin Cara in his match against Daniel Bryan. At Over the Limit on May 22, Sin Cara defeated Guerrero, and again on SmackDown to end their feud. Afterward, Guerrero mainly appeared on NXT with Darren Young. His last match in WWE was teaming up with JTG and Young against Yoshi Tatsu, Conor O'Brian and Vladimir Kozlov on NXT in a losing effort. On June 25, at his request, Guerrero was released by WWE, ending his 10-year tenure there.

=== Independent circuit (2011–2021) ===
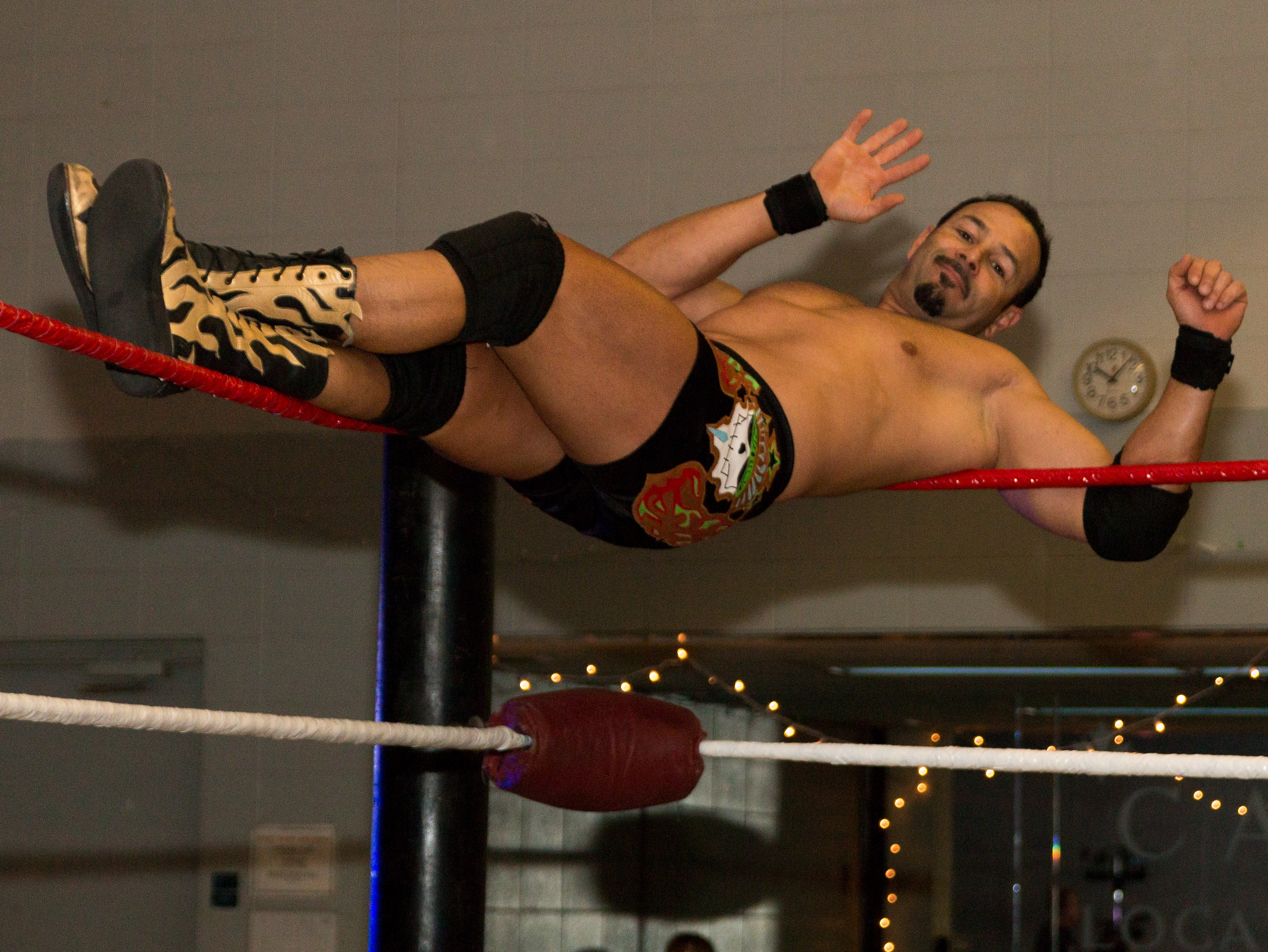
Guerrero on the American independent circuit in 2014

Guerrero appeared for the first time since his WWE departure at World Wrestling Council (WWC)'s Anniversario event on July 15 and 16, 2011. On July 16, Guerrero defeated El Sensacional Carlitos and Orlando Colón to win the WWC Caribbean Heavyweight Championship. In December 2011, Guerrero took part in Total Nonstop Action Wrestling's India project, Ring Ka King. During the first week of tapings, Guerrero and Bulldog Hart were crowned the promotion's inaugural Tag Team Champions. On July 28, 2012, Guerrero appeared at a Vendetta Pro Wrestling event in Lompoc, California, defeating Joey Ryan for the vacant Vendetta Pro Wrestling Heavyweight Championship, holding the title until October 27, 2012, when he lost it to Chris Masters.

On August 2, 2014, Guerrero teamed with his father Chavo Guerrero Sr. at Vendetta Pro Wrestling's "Summer Sizzle V – VendettaVersary" event in a "Father & Son vs. Father & Son" Tag Team match against La Familia de Tijuana (Damián 666 and Bestia 666). Los Guerreros picked up the win. Following the match, Damián made a challenge to Guerrero Jr. to a hair-vs-hair match, in which he volunteered to put Bestia's hair on the line against the hair of Guerrero Sr. Guerrero Jr. picked up the win, but Bestia fled the arena, claiming later that he never agreed to the stipulation himself. On September 19, 2014, Guerrero made his debut for Chikara, when he, Hernandez and Homicide, representing LAX, took part in the 2014 King of Trios. They were eliminated from the tournament in the first round by the Golden Trio (Dasher Hatfield, Icarus and Mark Angelosetti).

In 2017, Chavo signed with Imperio Lucha Libre to compete in the title tournament for the Imperio Sudamerican Title.

=== Total Nonstop Action Wrestling (2012–2013) ===
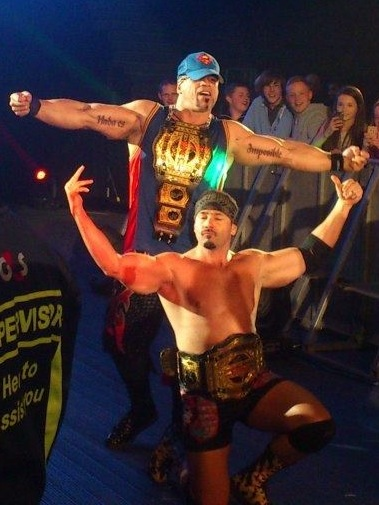
Guerrero and Hernandez with the TNA Tag Team Championship

On July 18, 2012, Total Nonstop Action Wrestling (TNA) announced that they had signed Guerrero to a contract. He made his debut on July 26 episode of Impact Wrestling, aligning himself with Hernandez and beginning a short feud with Gunner and Kid Kash. Guerrero appeared on August 12 at Hardcore Justice, where he teamed with Hernandez to defeat Gunner and Kash. The two subsequently set their sights on the TNA World Tag Team Championship, unsuccessfully challenging champions Bad Influence (Christopher Daniels and Kazarian) for the titles on September 6 episode of Impact Wrestling. Guerrero and Hernandez ultimately defeated Daniels and Kazarian on October 14 at Bound for Glory, in three-way match, also involving A.J. Styles and Kurt Angle to become the new TNA World Tag Team Champions. On January 25, at the tapings of January 31 episode of Impact Wrestling, Guerrero and Hernandez lost the TNA World Tag Team Championship to the Dirty Heels (Austin Aries and Bobby Roode).

Guerrero and Hernandez received their rematch for the titles on March 10 at Lockdown, but were again defeated by Aries and Roode in a three-way match, also involving Daniels and Kazarian. On following episode of Impact Wrestling, Guerrero and Hernandez were set for another shot at the titles, but the two were ambushed by the Aces & Eights before the match could start. The title match took place the following week, where Guerrero and Hernandez failed again to regain the TNA World Tag Team Championship, following interference from Daniels and Kazarian. On the next episode of Impact Wrestling, Guerrero and Hernandez defeated Daniels and Kazarian to earn another shot at the TNA World Tag Team Championship. Guerrero and Hernandez received their title shot on April 11 episode of Impact Wrestling, where they defeated Aries and Roode in a Two-out-of-Three Falls match, with the added stipulation that they would have to break up if they lost, to regain the TNA World Tag Team Championship. On June 2 at Slammiversary XI, Guerrero and Hernandez lost the TNA World Tag Team Championship to Gunner and James Storm in a fatal four-way elimination match, also involving Austin Aries and Bobby Roode and Bad Influence. On the following episode of Impact Wrestling, Guerrero was defeated by Hernandez in a 2013 Bound for Glory Series qualifying match. On December 12, Guerrero collected a briefcase in the Feast or Fired match, which was revealed the following week to contain a pink slip meaning he was fired from TNA. Guerrero's profile was later removed from the official site, and TNA issued a press release confirming his release as legitimate.

=== Lucha Underground (2014–2019) ===
In September 2014, it was reported that Guerrero had signed with Lucha Underground. Guerrero wrestled in the first match of the debut episode of Lucha Underground on October 29, losing to Blue Demon Jr. On November 5 episode, Guerrero used a chair to attack both Blue Demon Jr. and Sexy Star, who was Guerrero's tag partner earlier in the episode, turning Heel in the process. On January 7, 2015, episode (taped October 5, 2014), Guerrero participated in a 20-men Aztec Warfare battle royal to become the inaugural Lucha Underground Champion. However, he was attacked by Blue Demon and eliminated by Sexy Star. On January 18, 2015, (aired February 18) Guerrero was defeated by Mil Muertes and left Lucha Underground.

On May 20, 2015, Guerrero appeared in a video where he offered his help to Aztec Dragon to save his protegeé, Black Lotus. However, on June 3, Guerrero attacked Lotus, aligned himself with Dario Cueto and The Crew. Guerrero returned to Lucha Underground on June 10 (taped March 22, 2015), defeating Blue Demon Jr. On January 10, 2016, Guerrero won the vacant Gift of the Gods Championship in a match also involving Aero Star, El Siniestro de la Muerte, Joey Ryan, Sexy Star, Texano, and Willie Mack, though he lost the championship a week later to Cage. On November 3 Guerrero lost to Rey Mysterio in a "loser leaves Lucha Underground" match and per stipulation had to leave the temple.

Guerrero returned in Aztec Warfare 4 on the season 4 premiere, entering at number 17 and making it to the final 3 before being eliminated by Pentagon Dark. During the second part of Ultima Lucha Cuatro, Chavo saved his cousin Shaul Guerrero from being assaulted by Famous B, turning him back into a face.

The series was discontinued after season finale, Ultima Lucha Cuatro.

=== Nación Lucha Libre (2019–2020) ===
In 2019, Guerrero and fellow professional wrestler Alberto El Patron created their own promotion, Nación Lucha Libre. The promotion debuted on July 11 with their first show that featured wrestling from El Patron, El Hijo del Fantasma, L.A. Park, Thunder Rosa, Bestia 666, and Bandido. Three days later their promotion debuted their weekly show on Imagen TV in Mexico. Nación Lucha Libre closed down on January 8, 2020.

=== Return to Impact Wrestling (2019) ===
On September 13, 2019, he made an appearance for TNA, now known as Impact Wrestling at their Operation Override Twitch special. In the match, he defended his World Class Championship against MVP. Due to the disqualification finish, the two had a rematch at the following night's Victory Road Impact Plus Monthly Specials.

=== All Elite Wrestling and Ring of Honor (2021–2022) ===
Guerrero made his All Elite Wrestling debut on the July 21, 2021 episode of AEW Dynamite, where he was presented as the "executive consultant" for Andrade El Idolo. This was his first appearance on TNT since he lost to the new WCW Cruiserweight Champion Shane Helms in the final episode of WCW Monday Nitro on March 26, 2001. However, their partnership was short-lived when El Idolo turned on him on September 11, 2021, after interfering in his match against PAC.

After it, Guerrero took time off to film Young Rock in Australia. During this time, he was removed from the roster website.

On April 1, 2022, Guerrero reappeared during AEW's future sister promotion Ring of Honor's Supercard of Honor XV, at the Curtis Culwell Center in Garland, Texas, on the card's main event as Bandido's manager. The match was to determine the Undisputed ROH Champion. Bandido lost the match, in part thanks to Guerrero interfering in the match in two occasions, which did not go well with Bandido.

=== Return to WWE (2025–present) ===
In July 2025, Guerrero was shown in the audience at the first WWE and AAA Worlds Collide show, making his first appearance in WWE since 2011. It was reported that Guerrero would continue working with the company as a producer for the AAA brand. In September, Guerrero appeared in the ring at Worlds Collide: Las Vegas holding a banner honoring his uncle Eddie's work in AAA.

== Other media ==
He has appeared in at least 19 video games, including WCW games (WCW/nWo Revenge), and WWE games such as WWE Survivor Series, WWE Smackdown! Here Comes The Pain, WWE SmackDown! vs. Raw, WWE Smackdown! vs. Raw 2006, WWE Smackdown vs. Raw 2007, WWE Smackdown vs. Raw 2008, WWE Smackdown vs. Raw 2009, WWE Smackdown vs. Raw 2010, WWE Smackdown vs. Raw 2011 and WWE '12.

Chavo was in two documentaries about Rey Mysterio called Rey Mysterio: The Biggest Little Man and Rey Mysterio: 619. He was also featured in Viva La Raza: The Legacy of Eddie Guerrero.

Guerrero also has his own internet show/podcast called The Chavo Show on GeekNation. He has appeared on various other podcasts such as Chris Jericho's Talk is Jericho and Roddy Piper's Piper's Pit podcast.

Guerrero and Rey Mysterio own an online merchandise store named VivaVLR.com.

Chavo Guerrero also has his own craft beer, Los Guerreros, brewed and canned at Alosta Brewing Co. in Covina, California.

=== Acting ===
Guerrero's acting career has consisted of minor roles over the years. In 1996, he appeared in the TV show Red Shoe Diaries, in which he played a wrestler.

He played a character named Eddie on the Investigation Discovery series Detective in 2017 on episode titled "Warm Revolver".

He made an appearance as the fictional wrestler James Vazquez also known as El Mayordomo on the NBC TV series Grimm's fifth-season episode "Silence of the Slams". The episode aired on March 18, 2016. Also in 2016, Chavo played as a character named "Silas" in "Fight to the Finish", an action/sport/romance and was directed by Warren Sheppard. He also played a character named "Tex-Mex" in the movie 2016 Vigilante Diaries, an action movie.

In 2017 and 2018 Guerrero served as a fight coordinator for the Netflix TV show GLOW, training the cast as professional wrestlers. His uncle Mando Guerrero held the same position in the original GLOW series that inspired the Netflix show. Guerrero made cameos for two episodes of the second season as the wrestler Chico Guapo.

In 2021 Guerrero began working as Wrestling Coordinator for the NBC TV show Young Rock.

In 2023, he landed the role of The Sheik in the film The Iron Claw where he also served as consultant.

He, along with tag partner Archer and Brian Cage, appeared in Steven Spielberg's science fiction film Disclosure Day.

=== Comic books ===
Guerrero worked with Lion Forge Studios to create "Chavo Guerrero's Warrior's Creed" in which he stars as the main character. The first issue was published in June 2016. At least four issues of the comic have been published. The comics were written by author Fabian Nicieza.

== Personal life ==
Chavo is the son of Salvador "Chavo" Guerrero and Nancy Vasquez. He married his wife Shari in 1998 and has two sons with her.

On August 30, 2007, Guerrero, along with nine other WWE wrestlers were named by Sports Illustrated as having been given illegal steroids not in compliance with the WWE's Talent Wellness program. Guerrero received somatropin, nandrolone, and anastrozole between April 2005 and May 2006. Chris Benoit, Eddie Guerrero, and Brian Adams were also discovered to have been given steroids prior to their deaths during this investigation, as well as Sylvain Grenier.

In July 2016, Guerrero and his father were named part of a class action lawsuit filed against WWE which alleged that wrestlers incurred traumatic brain injuries during their tenure and that the company concealed the risks of injury. The suit was litigated by attorney Konstantine Kyros, who has been involved in a number of other lawsuits against WWE. The lawsuit was dismissed by US District Judge Vanessa Lynne Bryant in September 2018.

== Awards and nominations ==
Year	Award	Category	Nominated work	Result	Ref.
2023	St. Louis Film Critics Association	Best Stunts	The Iron Claw	Nominated	

== Championships and accomplishments ==
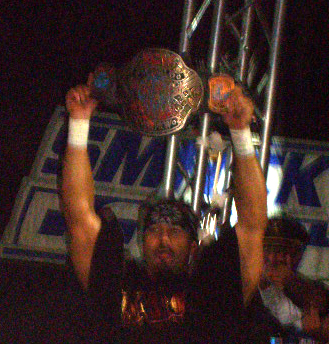
Guerrero is a former ECW Champion.

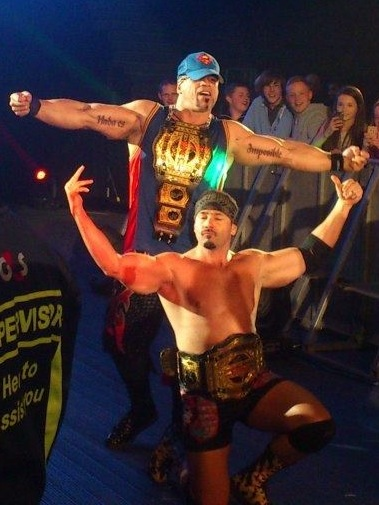
In TNA, Guerrero is a two-time TNA World Tag Team Champion with Hernandez.

- AAA
  - Lucha Libre World Cup (2016 Men's Division) – with Brian Cage and Johnny Mundo
- Cauliflower Alley Club
  - Men's Wrestling Award (2008) as part of The Wrestling Guerreros
- Imperial Wrestling Revolution/World Class Revolution
  - IWR/WCR Heavyweight Championship (1 time)
- Lucha Underground
  - Lucha Underground Gift of the Gods Championship (1 time)
- Pro Wrestling Illustrated
  - Ranked No. 17 of the top 500 singles wrestlers of the PWI 500 in 2004
  - Ranked No. 385 of the 500 best singles wrestlers of the PWI Years in 2003
- Ring Ka King
  - RKK Tag Team Championship (1 time) – with Bulldog Hart
  - RKK Tag Team Championship Tournament (2011) – with Bulldog Hart
- Total Nonstop Action Wrestling
  - TNA World Tag Team Championship (2 times) – with Hernandez
  - Feast or Fired (2013 – Pink Slip)
- Vendetta Pro Wrestling
  - Vendetta Pro Heavyweight Championship (1 time)
  - Vendetty Award—2014 Co-Special Guest star of the Year (with Chavo Guerrero Sr. and The Godfather)
- Fortitude Wrestling Entertainment
  - FWE Heavyweight Championship (1 time)
- World Championship Wrestling
  - WCW Cruiserweight Championship (2 times)
  - WCW World Tag Team Championship (1 time) – with Corporal Cajun
- World Wrestling Council
  - WWC Caribbean Heavyweight Championship (1 time)
- World Wrestling Entertainment
  - ECW Championship (1 time)
  - WWE Cruiserweight Championship (4 times)
  - WWE Tag Team Championship (2 times) – with Eddie Guerrero
- Wrestling Observer Newsletter
  - Tag Team of the Year (2002) with Eddie Guerrero
  - Worst Feud of the Year (2009) vs. Hornswoggle
- WrestleCrap
  - Gooker Award (2009) Feud with Hornswoggle
- Other titles
  - Talk 'N Shop A Mania 24/7 Championship (1 time)

== Luchas de Apuestas record ==
Winner (wager)	Loser (wager)	Location	Event	Date	Notes
Eddie Guerrero (hair)	Chavo Guerrero Jr. (hair)	San Diego, California	Bash at the Beach	July 12, 1998	
Chavo Guerrero Jr. (hair)	Damián 666 (hair)	Santa Maria, California	Summer Sizzle V – VendettaVersary	August 2, 2014	(Note: Chavo Guerrero Jr. wagered Chavo Guerrero Sr.'s hair and Damián 666 wagered Bestia 666's hair; however, Bestia 666 left the arena before the Guerreros could cut his hair.)
