= Chris Kanyon =

American professional wrestler (1970–2010)

- Kanyon as WCW United States Champion in 2001

Personal information
- Born: Christopher Morgan Klucsarits; January 4, 1970 Queens, New York, U.S.
- Died: April 2, 2010 (aged 40) Sunnyside, Queens, New York, U.S.
- Cause of death: Suicide by antidepressant overdose
- Education: University at Buffalo

Professional wrestling career
- Ring name(s): Chris Canyon; Chris K Chris Kanyon; Chris "Champagne" Kanyon; Mortis "Positively" Kanyon
- Billed height: 6 ft 4 in (193 cm)
- Billed weight: 268 lb (122 kg)
- Billed from: Queens, New York; Taipei (as Mortis)
- Trained by: Pete McKay Gonzalez; Ismael Gerena; Bobby Bold Eagle; Afa Anoaʻi; The Fabulous Moolah
- Debut: April 5, 1992

Christopher Morgan Klucsarits (January 4, 1970 – April 2, 2010) was an American professional wrestler. He was best known for his appearances with World Championship Wrestling (WCW) and the World Wrestling Federation (WWF) from 1994 to 2004, under the ring names Chris Kanyon, Kanyon, and Mortis.

== Early life and education ==
Kanyon was a fan of professional wrestling by age six. In 1992, he graduated from the University at Buffalo with a bachelor's degree in physical therapy, working full-time as a physical therapist for three years before becoming a wrestler.

== Professional wrestling career ==
=== Early career (1992–1995) ===
After college, he began training under Pete McKay Gonzalez, Ismael Gerena and Bobby Bold Eagle at the Lower East Side Wrestling Gym in Manhattan, debuting in 1992. Kanyon worked as a physical therapist for the next three years, wrestling on weekends and in the evenings, before finally deciding to become a full-time professional wrestler in 1995. In late 1994, he made several appearances with the World Wrestling Federation as a jobber, facing wrestlers such as Shawn Michaels, Diesel, Tatanka and Bob Holly. His friend and future manager James Mitchell saw potential in him and sent him for training with The Fabulous Moolah in South Carolina and with Afa at Wild Samoan wrestling School.

=== World Championship Wrestling (1995–2001) ===
==== Men at Work (1995–1996) ====
On May 5, 1995, Kanyon debuted in World Championship Wrestling (WCW) as a jobber, losing his first match to Mark Starr. His first pay-per-view appearance was at World War 3 on November 26, competing in a 60-man World War match for the vacant WCW World Heavyweight Championship. Following the event, Kanyon formed a tag team with Starr as "Men at Work", with the gimmick of construction workers. Kanyon last wrestled alongside Starr in May 1996 before being replaced with Mike Winner.

==== Mortis (1996–1998) ====
In December 1996, Kanyon donned a mask and was repackaged as Mortis (a Latin word meaning death), with James Vandenberg as his manager. Kanyon feuded with Glacier and faced him in a Mortal Kombat Martial Arts match at Uncensored on March 16, which he lost. Following the match, Wrath debuted, siding with Kanyon and assaulting Glacier. Glacier again defeated Kanyon at Slamboree on May 18. After the match, Wrath and Mortis once again attacked Glacier, who was spared a post-match beating when Ernest Miller ran to the ring to defend him. Mortis and Wrath defeated Glacier and Miller at Bash at the Beach on July 13. They defeated the Faces Of Fear (Meng and The Barbarian) at Fall Brawl on September 14. Mortis and Wrath continued to team together until the angle was quietly dropped in early 1998.

==== The Flock (1998–1999) ====
In February 1998, Kanyon (still in his guise as Mortis) asked Raven if he could join Raven's stable The Flock, but was told that he could only become a member if he defeated Diamond Dallas Page for the United States Heavyweight Championship. Mortis failed to defeat Page for the title on the February 12 episode of Thunder, and after the match, Raven hit him with the DDT on the entrance ramp, starting a feud between the two.

Kanyon was dubbed "The Innovator of Offense" by play-by-play commentator Mike Tenay due to his unique wrestling techniques and, before matches, asked the rhetorical question "Who Better than Kanyon"?. He formed an uneasy alliance with Perry Saturn in order to fight against The Flock, but eventually turned on Saturn and joined forces with Raven. At The Great American Bash on June 14, Kanyon defeated Saturn. They both lost to Raven in a triple threat match on August 8 at Road Wild. After Saturn forced The Flock to disband by defeating Raven at Fall Brawl on September 13, Kanyon and Raven continued to team together until Raven, in storyline, was sidelined with depression and Kanyon took time away from his wrestling career to work as stunt coordinator and stuntman on The Jesse Ventura Story.

==== Teaming and feuding with Diamond Dallas Page (1999–2001) ====
On May 9, 1999, at Slamboree, Kanyon appeared in a Sting mask to help Raven and Saturn defeat Billy Kidman and Rey Misterio Jr. for the WCW World Tag Team Championship. Later that month, Kanyon (substituting for Raven) and Saturn defended the titles against Bam Bam Bigelow and Diamond Dallas Page. During the match, Kanyon turned on Saturn, enabling Bigelow and Page to win the titles. Kanyon then formed a stable with Bigelow and Page known as the Jersey Triad, defeating Saturn and Chris Benoit to win the titles on June 13 at The Great American Bash. During their reign, they were given special dispensation by WCW President Ric Flair to defend the title as a three-man unit, granting them a numerical advantage over their opponents. However, the ruling was overturned by Flair's replacement Sting, and Kanyon and Bigelow lost the titles to Harlem Heat at Road Wild on August 14, 1999. The Triad disbanded shortly thereafter, with Kanyon once again placing his wrestling career on hiatus to work on the WCW produced film Ready to Rumble, where he served as stunt coordinator and as the stunt double of lead actor Oliver Platt.

Kanyon returned to WCW in late 1999 as Chris "Champagne" Kanyon, abbreviated to C.C.K., accompanied by J. Biggs, his "agent", and two former Nitro Girls, Baby and Chameleon. He claimed that he had become acclimatised to the glamor of Hollywood and thus began indulging in luxuries such as champagne, women, and expensive cars. He feuded briefly with Bigelow and Page before being removed from WCW by interim booker Kevin Sullivan.

Kanyon returned to WCW once more in April 2000 when Vince Russo replaced Sullivan. On May 7, at Slamboree, Kanyon attempted to save DDP from being powerbombed by Mike Awesome on top of the triple cage, which was also used in Ready to Rumble. Kanyon saved Page, but Awesome turned his attention to Kanyon, throwing him off the triple cage onto the ramp below. After a storyline which saw him in a halo brace in a hospital and in a wheelchair, Kanyon stepped out of the wheelchair and turned on Page on June 11 at The Great American Bash, costing him his Ambulance match against Awesome. Kanyon then joined Eric Bischoff, the leader of the New Blood faction. In the course of his renewed feud with Page, Kanyon began imitating Page, renaming himself "Positively" Kanyon (a reference to Page's autobiography, Positively Page). He began using a version of Page's finishing move, the Diamond Cutter, known as the Kanyon Kutter, arbitrarily delivering the move to various WCW backstage employees including Buff Bagwell's mother Judy. On August 13, Bagwell defeated Kanyon at New Blood Rising in a Judy Bagwell on a Forklift match. Kanyon left WCW shortly afterward.

Kanyon returned to WCW in February 2001 to renew his feud with Page, defeating him at SuperBrawl Revenge on February 18, but losing in a rematch the following night on Nitro. He lost to Ernest "The Cat" Miller at WCW's final pay-per-view, Greed, on March 18. Their feud was not resolved by the time WCW was purchased by the World Wrestling Federation (WWF) in late March 2001.

=== World Wrestling Federation / World Wrestling Entertainment (2001–2004) ===
==== The Alliance (2001) ====
On July 5, 2001, Kanyon made his WWF debut on SmackDown! as part of The Alliance, a group of former WCW wrestlers who were "invading" the WWF. At Invasion on July 22, Kanyon, Shawn Stasiak and Hugh Morrus defeated The Big Show, Billy Gunn and Albert. On the July 26 episode of SmackDown!, WCW Champion Booker T gave his WCW United States Championship to Kanyon, who began referring to himself as "The Alliance MVP". He and fellow Alliance member Diamond Dallas Page defeated the Acolytes Protection Agency (Faarooq and Bradshaw) on the August 9 episode of SmackDown! for the WWF Tag Team Championship. They lost the titles to The Brothers of Destruction (Kane and The Undertaker) in a steel cage match on August 19 at SummerSlam. Kanyon lost the WCW United States Championship to Tajiri on the September 10 episode of Raw. On October 29, Kanyon tore his left anterior cruciate ligament during a dark match with Randy Orton. He underwent surgery with Dr. James Andrews in Birmingham, Alabama and was sidelined for the remainder of the Invasion angle.

==== Brand switches (2002–2004) ====
In May 2002, Kanyon was cleared to compete and was sent to Ohio Valley Wrestling (OVW), a WWE developmental territory, through the end of the month to restore himself to full fitness. However, while wrestling Lance Cade in Lima, Ohio on July 13, Kanyon injured his left shoulder, suffering a humeral head contusion and supraspinatus tendinitis. He underwent surgery on July 21 but began experiencing breathing difficulties. As a result of an allergy to the medications with which he was being treated, Kanyon's lungs filled with fluid and his blood oxygen level fell to 41%. He gradually recovered and was discharged from the hospital on July 28, having lost 32 lb (15 kg) in the interim.

Kanyon returned to OVW in October 2002 and remained there for a further four months. On the February 13, 2003 episode of SmackDown! he returned to the main roster, emerging from a large crate from The Big Show, dressed as Boy George and singing the 1983 Culture Club hit "Do You Really Want to Hurt Me" to The Undertaker, prompting the latter to attack Kanyon and concussing him with a hard chair shot. Kanyon made his televised in-ring return on the April 19 edition of Velocity with his "Who Betta Than Kanyon?" gimmick, losing to Rhyno. At Vengeance on July 27, he participated in the APA's Invitational Bar Room Brawl. Kanyon was relegated to Velocity for the rest of 2003 and was released from WWE on February 9, 2004.

=== Late career (2004–2010) ===
Kanyon retired from professional wrestling on August 28, 2004, after losing a retirement match to Diamond Dallas Page in Wayne, New Jersey. In July 2005, he came out of retirement and returned to the independent circuit.

Kanyon appeared at the Total Nonstop Action Wrestling (TNA) pay-per-view Turning Point on December 11, 2005, as Larry Zbyszko's choice, Chris K, losing to Raven. Five days later, Kanyon appeared in Pro Wrestling Guerrilla (PWG) at Astonishing X-Mas, facing Joey Ryan for the PWG World Championship in a losing effort after someone wearing a Mortis outfit distracted Kanyon. On April 29, 2006, he appeared at the World Wrestling Legends (WWL) pay-per-view 6:05 The Reunion, losing to Page.

Kanyon announced his second retirement on April 5, 2007. He came out of retirement in December 2009 to wrestle for the New York Wrestling Connection (NYWC), where he worked shortly before his death. He wrestled his last match on January 30, 2010, as Mortis in a handicap match, defeating Blake Morris and Mike Reed.

== Personal life ==
Kanyon appeared on the CNN special Death Grip: Inside Pro Wrestling, in November 2007 following the aftermath of the Chris Benoit double-murder and suicide. On the program, Kanyon stated that on September 14, 2003, he had taken 50 sleeping pills in a suicide attempt.

In the early hours of October 16, 2005, he was arrested in Ybor City, Tampa, Florida for "disorderly conduct and resisting arrest without violence" after attempting to break up a fight. He was released that same day after a $750 cash bond.

Kanyon, along with Raven and Michael Sanders, attempted to sue WWE for "cheating them out of health care and other benefits" but a federal judge in Stamford, Connecticut, dismissed the case.

In 2004, after Kanyon's release from WWE, he began what was thought to be a gimmick in which he was an openly gay wrestler. This included an occasion in which he stated that WWE released him from his contract because of his sexuality. Kanyon later told reporters and radio personalities that this was just a publicity stunt, but later retracted those statements and acknowledged that he was, in fact, gay. Before his death, Kanyon was working on a book, Wrestling Reality, with Ryan Clark, which details Kanyon's struggles as a closeted gay man.

On September 23, 2021, Viceland pro wrestling Canadian docuseries Dark Side of the Ring aired an episode focusing on Kanyon's career as well as his struggles with his personal life.

=== Death ===
On April 2, 2010, Kanyon was found dead at his childhood home in Sunnyside, Queens, aged 40. An empty bottle of antidepressants and the drug Seroquel, as well as a suicide note were found near his body. He struggled with symptoms of bipolar disorder, having been diagnosed in 2004, and had threatened to end his own life in the weeks prior to his death. His death was acknowledged by WWE. Before his death, he worked as a physical therapist at Pulse Fitness and had plans to open a wrestling school.

== Championships and accomplishments ==
- Pro Wrestling Illustrated
  - Ranked No. 108 of the top 500 singles wrestlers in the PWI 500 in 1998
- World Championship Wrestling
  - WCW World Tag Team Championship (1 time) (Note: During this reign, any two of Kanyon, DDP and Bigelow could defend the title under the Freebird Rule.) – with Diamond Dallas Page and Bam Bam Bigelow
- World Wrestling Federation
  - WCW United States Championship (1 time)
  - WWF Tag Team Championship (1 time) – with Diamond Dallas Page

== See also ==
- List of premature professional wrestling deaths
