= Bobby Bold Eagle =

American professional wrestler and trainer (born 1948)

Personal information
- Born: Robert Cortes; July 28, 1948 (age 77) Window Rock, Arizona, U.S.
- Website: Bobby Bold Eagle on Myspace

Professional wrestling career
- Ring name(s): Bobby Bold Eagle; Bobby White Feather; Black Tiger
- Billed height: 5 ft 9 in (1.75 m)
- Billed weight: 220 lb (100 kg)
- Billed from: Window Rock, Arizona
- Trained by: Argentina Rocca; Ismael Gerena
- Debut: September 1968
- Retired: 1991

Robert Cortes (born July 28, 1948) is an American retired professional wrestler and trainer, known by his ring name Bobby Bold Eagle, who wrestled throughout the United States for the National Wrestling Alliance and the World Wide Wrestling Federation during the late 1960s and 1970s.

== Career ==
A protégé of Argentina Rocca, he made his WWWF debut in September 1968.

Cortes wrestled throughout the world during his near 15-year career including countries such as Guatemala, Mexico, Puerto Rico, Japan, Saudi Arabia, Africa and most of Europe. While in Joint Promotions in the 1980s, he held the promotion's tag team championship as part of a kayfabe "brother" tag team with former student Al Bold Eagle. He was also a sometimes ally of Big Daddy in his feud with Wild Angus Campbell and wrestled the likes of Pete LaPaque, Rollerball Rocco, Lucky Gordon, "Superstar" Mal Sanders, Dr. Death and Skull Murphy.

=== Retirement ===
After his retirement in 1991, following a tour of Spain and Germany, Cortes was the head trainer of the Lower East Side Wrestling School, owned and operated by Pete McKay in New York City, New York. Among his former students include Billy Firehawk, Tiger Khan (Marlon Kalkai), Peligro (Abe Guzman), Panther Chris Kanyon, Primo Carnera II and The Power Twins (Larry and David Sontag) as well as ECW alumni The Dirt Bike Kid, Rocco Rock, and Jason Knight.

== Championships and accomplishments ==
- Joint Promotions
  - Joint Promotions Tag Team Championship (1 time) - with Al Bold Eagle
- Three Rivers Wrestling Association
  - West Virginia Heavyweight Championship (1 time)
- Other titles
  - AAW Junior Heavyweight Championship (1 time)
  - CCW Junior Heavyweight Championship (1 time)
  - Canadian Junior Heavyweight Championship (1 time)
