= The Great American Bash (1991) =

World Championship Wrestling pay-per-view event

- Promotional poster featuring Ric Flair, Lex Luger, Sting, Nikita Koloff, and Missy Hyatt
- Promotion: World Championship Wrestling
- Date: July 14, 1991
- City: Baltimore, Maryland
- Venue: Baltimore Arena
- Attendance: 9,320
- Buy rate: 145,000
- Tagline: Legend vs Legacy

Pay-per-view chronology
← Previous; SuperBrawl I	Next → Halloween Havoc

The Great American Bash chronology
← Previous; 1990	Next → 1992

The 1991 Great American Bash was a professional wrestling pay-per-view event produced by World Championship Wrestling (WCW). It was the third annual Great American Bash under the WCW banner and the seventh annual Great American Bash event overall. It was also the first held by WCW alone following its split from the National Wrestling Alliance (NWA) in January 1991. The event took place on July 14, 1991, at the Baltimore Arena in Baltimore, Maryland. This was the fourth Great American Bash held at this venue after the 1988, 1989, and 1990 events.

The original scheduled card of the event was heavily changed. Ric Flair was scheduled to defend the WCW World Heavyweight Championship against Lex Luger in a steel cage match, but Flair quit WCW before the event and was replaced by Barry Windham, with the match being for the vacant championship. Luger defeated Windham to win his first world championship. The final bout of the show was a handicap steel cage match, in which Rick Steiner defeated Arn Anderson and Paul E. Dangerously.

== Production ==
=== Background ===
The Great American Bash is a professional wrestling event established in 1985. It was first produced by the National Wrestling Alliance's (NWA) Jim Crockett Promotions (JCP) and aired on closed-circuit television before becoming a pay-per-view event in 1988; JCP was rebranded as World Championship Wrestling (WCW) later that same year. The 1991 event was the third annual Great American Bash event promoted by WCW and seventh annual overall. The event took place on July 14, 1991, at the Baltimore Arena in Baltimore, Maryland. This was the fourth Great American Bash held at this venue after the 1988, 1989, and 1990 events. It was also the first Great American Bash held by WCW after it launched its own World Heavyweight Championship, independent from the NWA's version earlier that year in January.

=== Storylines ===
The card was originally to be headlined by a steel cage match between Ric Flair and Lex Luger for the WCW World Heavyweight Championship, and this match was heavily promoted on WCW television but two weeks before the show, then-WCW Executive Vice President Jim Herd fired Flair over a contract dispute, stripping him of the title in the process. At the time, champions left a $25,000 security deposit that would be refunded to them (along with any accumulated interest on the deposit) once they lost the title. As Herd did not give Flair back his deposit, Flair retained possession of the belt and later brought it to the World Wrestling Federation, where he appeared with it on television. WCW had to commission a new world championship belt. However, the new belt could not be readied in time for the event, so the company was forced to improvise. A Professional Wrestling Federation (Florida) title belt that was in the possession of Dusty Rhodes was used and a metal plate with "World Championship Wrestling" was attached to the front.

== Event ==
Other on-screen personnel
Role:	Name:
Commentators	Jim Ross
Commentators	Tony Schiavone
Ring announcer	Gary Michael Cappetta
Interviewer	Eric Bischoff
Referees	Mike Atkins
Referees	Randy Anderson
Referees	Nick Patrick

In the advertised main event, Lex Luger pinned Barry Windham, who replaced Flair, after delivering a piledriver on the orders of Harley Race. After the match, Luger turned heel and appointed Race as his manager and Mr. Hughes as his bodyguard.

P. N. News and Bobby Eaton were scheduled to face Steve Austin and Terrence Taylor in a traditional scaffold match but, on the day of the show, a "capture the flag" stipulation was added as the wrestlers were unwilling to perform a risky fall from the scaffold.

Dustin Rhodes and The Young Pistols (Tracy Smothers and Steve Armstrong) faced The Fabulous Freebirds in a six-man elimination match.

The masked Yellow Dog defeated Johnny B. Badd by disqualification when Badd's manager Teddy Long interfered to try and unmask Yellow Dog; had he done so, Brian Pillman (who was wrestling under the mask) would not have been allowed to wrestle in WCW again.

The final match was originally supposed to pit The Steiner Brothers and Missy Hyatt against Arn Anderson, Barry Windham and Paul E. Dangerously. After Windham was moved to the title match following Flair's departure from WCW and Scott Steiner sustained a bicep injury at the June 12 Clash of the Champions, the match was changed into a mixed tag team match pitting Rick Steiner and Missy Hyatt against Arn Anderson and Paul E. Dangerously. Before the match, Dick Murdoch and Dick Slater kidnapped Hyatt and forcibly took her backstage, turning the match into an 2-on-1 handicap match which Steiner won (in reality, this was done because the Maryland State Athletic Commission did not allow intergender matches).

== Aftermath ==
After winning the World title, Luger vacated his US title. Sting won a tournament for the vacant title, defeating Austin in the final.

Simmons was named as top contender to new World champion Luger. Windham, double-crossed by fellow heels Race and Hughes, began a slow move to babyface, confirmed three weeks later on August 5 at the St Joseph Civic Center when he and Simmons - after taking turns to rescue each other from attacks by Luger and his entourage - formed an alliance because, in Windham's words, "it looks like we've got the same enemies." At Halloween Havoc in October 1991, Simmons unsuccessfully challenged Luger for the championship, losing the best-of-three-falls match one fall to two.

Hughes amicably left the York Foundation to concentrate on his new alliance with Luger and Race. The York Foundation recruited Thomas Rich and he, Taylor and Morton won the WCW World Six-Man Tag Team Championship.

The Sting-Koloff feud came to an abortive end in August 1991 when Koloff left WCW to focus on running his gym, "Nikita's Fortress of Fitness," in Concord, North Carolina. Koloff returned to WCW in February 1992, saving Sting from an attack by The Dangerous Alliance. He explained on WCW's syndicated shows that he had seen the error of attacking Sting and that his actual grudge had been with Luger who in any case had shown his true colors by himself turning heel in the process of winning the World title at the 1991 Bash.

== Home media and Streaming ==
The event was released on home video in the United States and the United Kingdom by Turner Home Entertainment. In the UK, it was released in late 1992. The event was edited down to two hours and only seven of the eleven broadcast matches were included.

In 2014, the event was included on the WWE's streaming platform the WWE Network as part of its launch and remained on the service until the platform closed in 2026. In June 2026, WWE uploaded the event to stream freely on their WCW YouTube channel.

== Results ==
No.	Results	Stipulations	Times
1^{D}	Junkyard Dog defeated Black Bart	Singles match	12:45
2	P. N. News and Bobby Eaton defeated Steve Austin and Terrence Taylor (with Lady Blossom)	Capture-The-Flag Scaffold match	06:19
3	The Diamond Studd (with Diamond Dallas Page) defeated Tom Zenk	Singles match	09:00
4	Ron Simmons defeated Oz (with Merlin the Wizard)	Singles match	07:55
5	Richard Morton (with Alexandra York) defeated Robert Gibson	Singles match	17:03
6	Dustin Rhodes and The Young Pistols (Tracy Smothers and Steve Armstrong) defeated The Fabulous Freebirds (Michael Hayes, Jimmy Garvin and Badstreet) (with Big Daddy Dink)	Elimination match	17:10
7	The Yellow Dog defeated Johnny B. Badd (with Teddy Long) by disqualification	Singles match	06:00
8	Big Josh defeated Black Blood	Lumberjack match	05:39
9	El Gigante defeated One Man Gang (with Kevin Sullivan)	Singles match	06:13
10	Nikita Koloff defeated Sting	Russian Chain match	11:38
11	Lex Luger defeated Barry Windham	Steel Cage match for the vacant WCW World Heavyweight Championship	12:25
12	Rick Steiner defeated Arn Anderson and Paul E. Dangerously	Steel Cage match	02:08
D / – this was a dark match

=== Dustin Rhodes and Young Pistols vs. Fabulous Freebirds eliminations ===
Elimination no.	Wrestler	Team	Eliminated by	Elimination move	Time
1	Steve Armstrong	Dustin Rhodes/Young Pistols	Michael Hayes	Double DDT with Badstreet	13:49
2	Michael Hayes	Fabulous Freebirds	None	Disqualified for backdropping Smothers over the top rope	14:04
3	Tracy Smothers	Dustin Rhodes/Young Pistols	Jimmy Garvin	Double DDT with Badstreet	15:16
4	Jimmy Garvin	Fabulous Freebirds	Dustin Rhodes	Lariat	15:24
5	Badstreet	Fabulous Freebirds	Dustin Rhodes	Bulldog	17:10
Survivor:	Dustin Rhodes				
