= The Great American Bash (1990) =

World Championship Wrestling pay-per-view event

- VHS cover featuring Sting and Ric Flair
- Promotion: National Wrestling Alliance: World Championship Wrestling
- Date: July 7, 1990
- City: Baltimore, Maryland
- Venue: Baltimore Arena
- Attendance: 14,000
- Buy rate: 200,000
- Tagline: The New Revolution

Pay-per-view chronology
← Previous; Capital Combat	Next → Halloween Havoc

The Great American Bash chronology
← Previous; 1989	Next → 1991

The 1990 Great American Bash was the second annual Great American Bash professional wrestling pay-per-view (PPV) event produced by World Championship Wrestling (WCW) under the National Wrestling Alliance (NWA) banner, and the sixth annual Great American Bash event overall. It was the final held under the NWA banner, as WCW seceded from the NWA in January 1991. The event took place on July 7, 1990, at the Baltimore Arena in Baltimore, Maryland. This was the third Great American Bash held at this venue after the 1988 and 1989 events. This event featured the WCW debut of Big Van Vader.

In the main event, Ric Flair defended the NWA World Heavyweight Championship against Sting. Sting pinned Flair after countering his Figure Four Leglock attempt into a small package. During the match, The Steiner Brothers, Paul Orndorff, and The Junkyard Dog (the "Dudes with Attitudes") surrounded the ring to prevent outside interference by The Four Horsemen. During the entirety of the match, Ole Anderson was handcuffed to El Gigante.

== Production ==
=== Background ===
The Great American Bash is a professional wrestling event established in 1985. It was first produced by the National Wrestling Alliance's (NWA) Jim Crockett Promotions (JCP) and aired on closed-circuit television before becoming a pay-per-view event in 1988; JCP was rebranded as World Championship Wrestling (WCW) later that same year. The 1990 event was the second annual Great American Bash event promoted by WCW and the sixth annual overall. The event took place on July 7, 1990, at the Baltimore Arena in Baltimore, Maryland. This was the third Great American Bash held at this venue after the 1988 and 1989 events.

=== Storylines ===
Other on-screen personnel
Role:	Name:
Commentators	Jim Ross
Commentators	Bob Caudle
Ring announcer	Gary Michael Cappetta
Interviewer	Gordon Solie
Referees	Randy Anderson
Referees	Nick Patrick
Referees	Mike Atkins

The event featured wrestlers from pre-existing scripted feuds and storylines. Wrestlers portrayed villains, heroes, or less distinguishable characters in the scripted events that built tension and culminated in a wrestling match or series of matches.

== Aftermath ==
The 1990 Great American Bash would be the final Great American Bash held under the NWA banner, as WCW seceded from the NWA in January 1991.

This would be Mark Callous' final appearance on a WCW PPV, after allegedly being told by booker Ole Anderson he would not draw well. Callous would head to the WWF where he would prove Ole wrong by becoming the legendary Undertaker.

Harley Race would wrestle only house shows until retiring from active wrestling in December 1990. He wouldn't return until next year's Great American Bash.

Sting would hold the NWA World Heavyweight title through the remainder of 1990, shortly after the GAB a mysterious wrestler allegedly from Sting's past would begin haunting him under the name "The Black Scorpion".

== Home media and streaming ==
The event was released on home video in the United States and the United Kingdom by Turner Home Entertainment. The event was edited down to two hours, with four matches cut in their entirety.

In 2014, the event was included on the WWE's streaming platform the WWE Network as part of its launch and remained on the service until the platform closed in 2026. In June 2026, WWE uploaded the event to stream freely on their WCW YouTube channel.

== Results ==
No.	Results	Stipulations	Times
1^{D}	David Sierra defeated Mr. X	Singles match	10:06
2	Brian Pillman defeated Buddy Landel	Singles match	09:29
3	Mike Rotunda defeated The Iron Sheik	Singles match	06:46
4	Doug Furnas defeated Dutch Mantel	Singles match	11:18
5	Harley Race defeated Tommy Rich	Singles match	06:32
6	The Midnight Express (Bobby Eaton and Stan Lane) (c) (with Jim Cornette) defeated The Southern Boys (Steve Armstrong and Tracy Smothers)	Tag team match for the NWA United States Tag Team Championship	18:14
7	Big Van Vader defeated Tom Zenk	Singles match	02:16
8	The Steiner Brothers (Rick Steiner and Scott Steiner) defeated The Fabulous Freebirds (Michael Hayes and Jimmy Garvin)	Tag team match	13:45
9	Paul Orndorff, Junkyard Dog and El Gigante defeated The Horsemen (Sid Vicious, Arn Anderson and Barry Windham) by disqualification	Six-man tag team match	08:53
10	Lex Luger (c) defeated Mark Callous (with Paul E. Dangerously)	Singles match for the NWA United States Heavyweight Championship	12:10
11	Doom (Ron Simmons and Butch Reed) (c) (with Teddy Long) defeated The Rock 'n' Roll Express (Ricky Morton and Robert Gibson)	Tag team match for the NWA World Tag Team Championship	15:40
12	Sting defeated Ric Flair (c) (with Ole Anderson)	Singles match for the NWA World Heavyweight Championship	16:06
(c) / – the champion(s) heading into the match; D / – this was a dark match

== See also ==
- 1990 in professional wrestling
