= The Great American Bash (1989) =

World Championship Wrestling pay-per-view event

- DVD Cover featuring Terry Funk, Ric Flair, Lex Luger, and Ricky Steamboat.
- Promotion: National Wrestling Alliance: World Championship Wrestling
- Date: July 23, 1989
- City: Baltimore, Maryland
- Venue: Baltimore Arena
- Attendance: 14,500
- Buy rate: 140,000
- Tagline: The Glory Days

Pay-per-view chronology
← Previous; WrestleWar	Next → Halloween Havoc

The Great American Bash chronology
← Previous; 1988	Next → 1990

The 1989 Great American Bash was the first Great American Bash professional wrestling pay-per-view (PPV) event produced by World Championship Wrestling (WCW) under the National Wrestling Alliance (NWA) banner and the fifth annual Great American Bash event overall; the previous events were held by the former NWA's Jim Crockett Promotions. It took place on July 23, 1989, at the Baltimore Arena in Baltimore, Maryland. This was the second Great American Bash held at this venue after the 1988 event.

The main event was a standard wrestling match for the NWA World Heavyweight Championship. Ric Flair defended the title against Terry Funk. Flair pinned Funk by reversing an Inside Cradle attempt to retain the title. Featured matches on the undercard saw The Road Warriors (Hawk and Animal), Midnight Express (Bobby Eaton and Stan Lane), and Steve Williams versus Fabulous Freebirds (Jimmy Garvin, Michael Hayes, and Terry Gordy) and Samoan Swat Team (Samu and Fatu) in a WarGames match, Lex Luger versus Ricky Steamboat for the NWA United States Heavyweight Championship, Sting versus The Great Muta for the NWA World Television Championship, Steiner Brothers (Rick Steiner and Scott Steiner) versus The Varsity Club (Mike Rotunda and Kevin Sullivan) in a Texas Tornado match, Jim Cornette versus Paul E. Dangerously in a Tuxedo match, The Skyscrapers (Sid Vicious and Dan Spivey) versus Dynamic Dudes (Johnny Ace and Shane Douglas), and a Two-Ring King of the Hill Battle Royal.

== Production ==
=== Background ===
The Great American Bash is a professional wrestling event established in 1985. It was first produced by the National Wrestling Alliance's (NWA) Jim Crockett Promotions (JCP) and aired on closed-circuit television before becoming a pay-per-view event in 1988. In November 1988, JCP was rebranded as World Championship Wrestling (WCW). As such, the 1989 event was the first Great American Bash event promoted by WCW and fifth annual overall. It took place on July 23, 1989, at the Baltimore Arena in Baltimore, Maryland. This was the second Great American Bash held at this venue after the 1988 event.

=== Storylines ===
The Great American Bash featured nine professional wrestling matches that involved wrestlers from pre-existing rivalries, plots and storylines that were played out on World Wide Wrestling, Pro, Power Hour and World Championship Wrestling–WCW's television programs. Wrestlers portrayed a hero, villain or a tweener as they followed a series of events that built tension, and culminated in a wrestling match or a series of matches.

The main rivalry heading into the event was between Ric Flair and Terry Funk for the NWA World Heavyweight Championship. At WrestleWar, Flair defeated Ricky Steamboat to win the title. After the match, Funk challenged Flair for the title but Flair refused to defend it because Funk was not ranked in the Top 10 contender's list for the title. Funk proceeded to attack Flair and perform a Piledriver on him through the table, thus making Flair a fan favorite. This resulted in Funk winning matches usually against local competitors and improving himself to be ranked in the Top 10. He would make mentions of injuring Flair. On July 1 edition of World Championship Wrestling, Flair requested the WCW Executive Vice President Jim Herd to allow him to defend the title against Funk at The Great American Bash, which Herd accepted.

A secondary rivalry heading into the event was between Lex Luger and Ricky Steamboat for the NWA United States Heavyweight Championship. At WrestleWar, Steamboat lost the NWA World Heavyweight Championship to Ric Flair and Luger lost the NWA United States Heavyweight Championship to Michael Hayes. On May 22, Luger regained the title by defeating Hayes at a live event. On June 10 edition of World Championship Wrestling, Luger gave negative remarks on being held back and claimed to be worthy of getting a title shot for the NWA World Heavyweight Championship instead of Ricky Steamboat or Terry Funk. On June 14 Clash of the Champions VII, Funk got disqualified during his match against Steamboat by hitting him with a microphone. Luger made the save and ran off Funk but then attacked Steamboat himself, becoming a villain. On June 24 edition of World Championship Wrestling, Luger announced in an interview that he attacked Steamboat because he was tired of making fans happy and wanted to prove himself better than Steamboat. On July 1 edition of World Championship Wrestling, it was announced that Luger would defend the United States Heavyweight Championship against Steamboat at The Great American Bash.

Another secondary rivalry heading into the event was between Sting and The Great Muta for the NWA World Television Championship. At WrestleWar, Sting retained the Television Championship against The Iron Sheik and Muta defeated Doug Gilbert. On May 13 edition of World Championship Wrestling, Muta and his manager Gary Hart challenged Sting to a Dragon Shi match. On May 20 edition of World Championship Wrestling, Sting challenged Muta to an immediate match but Hart claimed that he and Muta were not ready. On May 27 edition of World Championship Wrestling, it was announced that Eddie Gilbert had accepted Muta's open challenge for a Dragon Shi match. On June 14 edition of Clash of the Champions VII, an in-ring presentation of Dragon Shi was held, during which Gilbert accidentally struck a fireball into Trent Knight's face. On July 1 edition of World Championship Wrestling, it was announced that Sting would defend the World Television Championship against Muta at The Great American Bash.

At WrestleWar, The Varsity Club (Mike Rotunda and Steve Williams) retained the NWA World Tag Team Championship against The Road Warriors (Hawk and Animal) by disqualification when Kevin Sullivan and Dan Spivey attacked the referee Nikita Koloff. This caused the titles to be vacated by the WCW Executive Vice President Jim Herd. A tournament occurred to determine the new champions. The quarter-final round took place on editions of World Championship Wrestling. Fabulous Freebirds (Michael Hayes and Terry Gordy) defeated Road Warriors, Dynamic Dudes (Johnny Ace and Shane Douglas) defeated Jack Victory and Rip Morgan, Samoan Swat Team defeated Ranger Ross and Ron Simmons and Midnight Express (Bobby Eaton and Stan Lane) defeated Butch Reed and The Raider. On June 14 edition of Clash of the Champions VII, the semi-final round and the final round took place. In the semi-final round, Fabulous Freebirds (Michael Hayes and Jimmy Garvin) defeated Dynamic Dudes and Midnight Express defeated Samoan Swat Team. In the final round, Fabulous Freebirds defeated Midnight Express to win the vacant titles. The interferences of Road Warriors and Samoan Swat Team in each other's matches throughout the tournament began a rivalry between the two teams as well as beginning a new rivalry between Fabulous Freebirds and Midnight Express. On June 17 edition of World Championship Wrestling, Williams became a fan favorite when Jim Cornette made him, the newest ally of Midnight Express against Fabulous Freebirds. Later that night, Terry Gordy defeated Williams, with the help of Michael Hayes and Jimmy Garvin, which resulted in a brawl between several teams. On July 1 edition of World Championship Wrestling, it was announced that a WarGames match would take place at The Great American Bash pitting Road Warriors, Midnight Express and Steve Williams against Fabulous Freebirds and Samoan Swat Team.

The predominant tag team rivalry heading into the event was between Steiner Brothers (Rick Steiner and Scott Steiner) and Varsity Club (Mike Rotunda and Kevin Sullivan). At WrestleWar, Eddie Gilbert and Rick Steiner defeated Sullivan and Dan Spivey to retain the NWA United States Tag Team Championship. Following the event, Steve Williams and Dan Spivey left the group and it was reduced to Sullivan and Rotunda. Rick suffered a shoulder injury and his brother Scott was placed in a rivalry with Sullivan. A female fan of Rick was shown in the crowd during Scott's matches, resulting in Sullivan confronting her on June 3 edition of World Championship Wrestling. On June 14 edition of Clash of the Champions, Varsity Club defeated Steiner Brothers. Rick's fan Robin Green's flowers were torn up by Varsity Club during Steiner Brothers' match on June 24 edition of World Championship Wrestling. On July 22 edition of World Championship Wrestling, it was announced that Steiner Brothers would compete against Varsity Club in a Texas Tornado match at The Great American Bash.

On April 2 Clash of the Champions VI, NWA referee Teddy Long favored Varsity Club (Mike Rotunda and Steve Williams) during their NWA World Tag Team Championship opportunity against Road Warriors and gave a fast count pinfall to Varsity Club. As a result, Long was fired of his referee duties. He became a manager and the newcomer Norman the Lunatic was his first client. Long continued to expand his roster by putting former Varsity Club member Dan Spivey with newcomer Sid Vicious in a tag team called The Skyscrapers. On July 1 edition of World Championship Wrestling, Skyscrapers made its debut by defeating two local competitors. On July 15 edition of World Championship Wrestling, it was announced that Dynamic Dudes would wrestle Skyscrapers in a tag team match at The Great American Bash.

On June 14 edition of Clash of the Champions VI, it was announced that a Two-Ring King of the Hill Battle Royal would take place at The Great American Bash. Qualifying battle royals were held throughout the next one month to determine the participants of the final at the event.

== Event ==
Other on-screen personnel
Role:	Name:
Commentator	Jim Ross
Commentator	Bob Caudle
Interviewer	Gordon Solie
Referee	Nick Patrick
Referee	Tommy Young
Ring announcer	Gary Michael Cappetta

=== Preliminary matches ===
The first match of the event was a Two-Ring King of the Hill Battle Royal. The match consisted of two rings. The rules were that once a competitor was tossed out of the first ring, he would battle in the second ring. The last competitor standing in the first ring would be the winner of the first ring and the eliminated participants would compete in the second ring. The last competitor of the second ring would compete against the winner of the first ring in a standard wrestling match. The participants of the match were Eddie Gilbert, Terry Gordy, Scott Hall, Bill Irwin, Brian Pillman, Ranger Ross, Mike Rotunda, Ron Simmons, Rick Steiner, Scott Steiner, Steve Williams, Kevin Sullivan, Sid Vicious and Dan Spivey. Ross and Simmons were the first two participants to be tossed out of the first ring and battle each other in the second ring. All the participants with the exception of Pillman and Vicious were tossed out of the first ring and battled in the second ring. Pillman and Vicious fought against each other in the first ring, with Sid eventually eliminating Pillman by avoiding a Diving Crossbody and tossing him over the top rope. As a result, Sid won the Battle Royal of the first ring. The action continued in the second ring as Williams eliminated Irwin and Rotunda and Spivey eliminated Pillman by double-teaming him. Williams delivered a Powerslam to Rotunda and eliminated him. He battled Spivey until Rotunda distracted Williams. This allowed Spivey to deliver a Clothesline to Williams and eliminate him to win the Battle Royal in the second ring. This set up a match between Vicious and Spivey but their manager Teddy Long announced that the two would split the reward of $50,000.

In the next match, Brian Pillman competed against Bill Irwin. Irwin dominated much of the match until Pillman gained momentum by using quick high-flying moves. Pillman's momentum was stopped when he missed a Missile Dropkick on Irwin. Irwin delivered a Gutwrench Suplex to Pillman and threw him into the other ring. He tried to chase Pillman but the referee prevented him from going after Pillman. This distraction allowed Pillman to recover and perform a Diving Crossbody from ring one onto Irwin in ring two for the victory.

The third match was a tag team match between Dynamic Dudes (Johnny Ace and Shane Douglas) and The Skyscrapers (Sid Vicious and Dan Spivey). Skyscrapers dominated the earlier competition against Dudes. Sid dominated the match against Douglas and applied a Stomach Clawhold on Douglas. Spivey was tagged in. He continued to dominate Douglas by performing a Sidewalk Slam and a Backbreaker. Douglas avoided a Headbutt by Spivey and tagged in Ace. Ace delivered a Flying Clothesline and attempted to pin Spivey but Sid kicked him in the face. Sid and Spivey tried to deliver a Double Clothesline but Ace moved out of the way and both men hit each other. Douglas and Ace double-teamed Spivey until the referee took Douglas out of the ring. It allowed Spivey to take advantage and perform a One Shoulder Powerbomb on Ace to win the match.

The next match was a Tuxedo match pitting Jim Cornette against Paul E. Dangerously. Cornette gained the early momentum by countering Dangerously as he tried to throw Dangerously's jacket but Dangerously threw some powder in Cornette's face. Dangerously started attacking Cornette and controlled the momentum of the match. Cornette gained control of the match by blocking an Elbow Drop. Cornette ripped off Dangerously's shirt. Dangerously tried to use powder again but Cornette threw it back in Dangerously's face and ripped off Dangerously's tuxedo for the victory.

The fifth match was a Texas Tornado match between Steiner Brothers (Rick Steiner and Scott Steiner) and The Varsity Club (Mike Rotunda and Kevin Sullivan). In this match, all the competitors were legal and there was no need to be tagged in. Sullivan and Rick started against each other while Rotunda and Scott battled each other. Rotunda dominated Scott and threw him out of the ring, which allowed Rotunda and Sullivan to double-team Rick. Scott entered the ring and Rick delivered a Belly To Back Suplex to Sullivan. Sullivan tossed Rick on the floor outside the ring. The match continued as Sullivan and Rotunda dominated the match. Rick tried to deliver a Lariat, which he called Steinerline, to Sullivan but Sullivan tossed him out of the ring. Scott was double teamed by Varsity Club. Rotunda came off the ropes to attack Scott but he pulled the rope down causing Rotunda to fall to the floor. In the ring, Sullivan tried to deliver a Shoulderbreaker to Rick but Scott delivered a Diving Crossbody on Sullivan. Both Steiner Brothers fell on Sullivan and pinned him to win the match.

=== Main event matches ===
The sixth match was a standard match for the NWA World Television Championship. Sting defended the title against The Great Muta. Sting started the ring by flying over the ropes onto Muta in the second ring. Muta's manager Gary Hart distracted Sting, allowing Muta to deliver a Judo Chop. Muta tried to deliver a Moonsault for the victory but Sting moved out of the way. Muta started dominating the match but Sting delivered a Clothesline to gain advantage. Sting dropkicked Muta down and the two continued to exchange momentum and moves. The match started to change when Muta tried to deliver a Red Mist to Sting but Sting moved out and the referee Nick Patrick was hit with it. Sting attacked Muta and tried to deliver a Stinger Splash but Muta avoided it and delivered a Moonsault. Tommy Young replaced Nick Patrick as the referee and entered the ring to count the pinfall for Muta but Sting kicked out at 2 and became the first wrestler to kick out of Moonsault. Muta tried to deliver a Spin Kick but Sting countered it and delivered him a Belly To Back Suplex to win the match and retain the title. However, controversy surrounded the match as both men had their shoulders up at two count. The referees argued over it and Muta stole the title belt.

In the next match, Lex Luger defended the NWA United States Heavyweight Championship against Ricky Steamboat in a No Disqualification match. However, Luger protested and wanted the match to occur with count-outs and disqualifications in effect. Steamboat agreed. Steamboat started the match with a bunch of roll-ups. Steamboat delivered several moves to dominate the early part of the match. Luger kicked Steamboat out of the ring and attacked him outside the ring but Steamboat delivered a Chop to Luger. Steamboat tried to deliver a Diving Mongolian Chop but Luger countered with many of high-impact moves. He made a pinfall attempt but got a near-fall. He got another near-fall and complained that he was not getting a fast count. He started clotheslining Steamboat and argued with referee Tommy Young. Steamboat took advantage and delivered a Crossbody for a near-fall. Luger started regaining momentum by hitting power moves on Steamboat. Steamboat countered Luger and delivered a Diving Mongolian Chop but got a near-fall. Luger stayed with the ropes. Steamboat tried to attack Luger but Luger delivered a Back Body Drop to Steamboat, sending him into the other ring. Luger shoved the referee and brought a chair. Steamboat delivered a Catapult to Luger and started attacking Luger with a chair to get disqualified. As a result, Luger won the match and retained the United States Heavyweight Championship. Steamboat continued to attack Luger with the chair after the match.

The final match on the undercard was a WarGames match. The Road Warriors (Hawk and Animal), Midnight Express (Bobby Eaton and Stan Lane) and Steve Williams took on Fabulous Freebirds (Jimmy Garvin, Michael Hayes and Terry Gordy) and Samoan Swat Team (Samu and Fatu). Eaton and Garvin started the match. Gordy entered next and joined Garvin in double-teaming Eaton. Williams entered next and attacked both Garvin and Gordy. Samu entered next and the team of Faboulous Freebirds and Samoan Swat Team got advantage. Animal entered next to even the numbers. Animal started dominating the opposing team but Fatu entered next and stopped his dominance. Samoan Swat Team dominated Animal, while Garvin and Gordy attacked Eaton and Williams. Stan Lane from Midnight Express was the fourth wrestler from his team to enter. He attacked the opposing team into the cage prompting Michael Hayes to enter next and deliver DDTs to everyone. Fabulous Freebirds and Samoan Swat Team dominated the four members of the opposing team. Hawk entered next and started dominating opposing members, leading to his teammates getting advantage. Road Warriors tried to deliver an Electric Chair, Flying Clothesline Combination, which they called Doomsday Device, to Gordy but Garvin rescued Gordy, so Hawk delivered a Flying Clothesline to Garvin. Hawk delivered a Reverse Neckbreaker and a Hangman's Neckbreaker, making Garvin submit.

In the main event, Ric Flair defended the NWA World Heavyweight Championship against Terry Funk.

=== Aftermath ===
Ric Flair's and Terry Funk's feud continued into the fall, with a match at Clash of the Champions VIII that resulted in controversy when Funk tied a plastic bag around Flair's head in an attempt to "suffocate" him, then the feud ended when Flair beat Funk at Clash of the Champions IX in an "I Quit" match. Sting and The Great Muta continued their feud as well, after the TV title was held up due to the double pin, a tournament was held and Muta beat Sting to win the World TV title. Sting and Flair, former enemies, would later join forces against Hart's J-Tex Corporation (Muta, Funk, Buzz Sawyer and the Dragonmaster), Sting and Flair were later bolstered by the returning Arn Anderson and Ole Anderson in December. Steamboat would leave WCW and bounce around the indies before returning to the WWF in 1991 as "The Dragon".

== Results ==
No.	Results	Stipulations	Times
1	The Skyscrapers won by last eliminating Steve Williams	King of the Hill Double Ring Battle Royal (Note: The other participants in the battle royal: Bill Irwin, Brian Pillman, Eddie Gilbert, Kevin Sullivan, Mike Rotunda, Ranger Ross, Rick Steiner, Ron Simmons, Scott Hall, Scott Steiner and Terry Gordy.)	10:20
2	Brian Pillman defeated Bill Irwin	Singles match	10:18
3	The Skyscrapers (Sid Vicious and Dan Spivey) defeated The Dynamic Dudes (Shane Douglas and Johnny Ace)	Tag team match	09:14
4	Jim Cornette defeated Paul E. Dangerously	Tuxedo match	06:22
5	The Steiner Brothers (Rick Steiner and Scott Steiner) (with Missy Hyatt) defeated The Varsity Club (Kevin Sullivan and Mike Rotunda)	Texas Tornado match	04:22
6	Sting (c) (with Eddie Gilbert) vs. The Great Muta (with Gary Hart) ended with a double pin	Singles match for the NWA World Television Championship	08:40
7	Lex Luger (c) defeated Ricky Steamboat by disqualification	Singles match for the NWA United States Heavyweight Championship	10:26
8	The Road Warriors (Hawk and Animal), The Midnight Express (Bobby Eaton and Stan Lane) and Steve Williams (with Paul Ellering and Jim Cornette) defeated The Fabulous Freebirds (Michael Hayes, Jimmy Garvin and Terry Gordy) and The Samoan SWAT Team (Samu and Fatu) (with Paul E. Dangerously)	WarGames match	22:18
9	Ric Flair (c) defeated Terry Funk (with Gary Hart)	Singles match for the NWA World Heavyweight Championship	17:23
(c) / – the champion(s) heading into the match
