= The Great American Bash (1988) =

Jim Crockett Promotions pay-per-view event

- VHS cover featuring Nikita Koloff and Tully Blanchard
- Promotion: National Wrestling Alliance: Jim Crockett Promotions
- Date: July 10, 1988
- City: Baltimore, Maryland
- Venue: Baltimore Arena
- Attendance: 14,000
- Buy rate: 190,000
- Tagline: The Price for Freedom

Pay-per-view chronology
← Previous; The Bunkhouse Stampede Finals	Next → Starrcade

The Great American Bash chronology
← Previous; 1987	Next → 1989

The 1988 Great American Bash was the fourth annual Great American Bash professional wrestling event produced by the National Wrestling Alliance's (NWA) Jim Crockett Promotions (JCP). It was the first Great American Bash event to air on pay-per-view (PPV). The event took place on July 10, 1988, at the Baltimore Arena in Baltimore, Maryland. This was the final NWA event produced by JCP and the third and final NWA event to be produced as a pay-per-view, as JCP was purchased by Turner Broadcasting System in November 1988 and was rebranded as World Championship Wrestling (WCW). This was also the first Pay Per View produced under the Turner Home Entertainment banner as the other two events (Starrcade '87 and the Bunkhouse Stampede Finals in January 1988) were produced by The Wrestling Network.

The main event was a standard wrestling match for the NWA World Heavyweight Championship. Ric Flair defeated Lex Luger to retain the title when the match was stopped due to Luger's excessive bleeding. Featured matches on the undercard saw Barry Windham versus Dusty Rhodes for the NWA United States Heavyweight Championship, The Road Warriors (Hawk and Animal), Steve Williams, Jimmy Garvin, and Ron Garvin versus Kevin Sullivan, Mike Rotunda, Al Perez, Russian Assassin, and Ivan Koloff in a Tower of Doom match, The Fantastics (Bobby Fulton and Tommy Rogers) versus The Midnight Express (Bobby Eaton and Stan Lane) for the NWA United States Tag Team Championship, and Arn Anderson and Tully Blanchard versus Sting and Nikita Koloff for the NWA World Tag Team Championship.

== Production ==
=== Background ===
The Great American Bash is a professional wrestling event established in 1985, produced by the National Wrestling Alliance's (NWA) Jim Crockett Promotions (JCP) and available on closed-circuit television. The 1988 event was the fourth annual Great American Bash and was the first to be broadcast on pay-per-view. It took place on July 10, 1988, at the Baltimore Arena in Baltimore, Maryland.

=== Storylines ===
The Great American Bash featured five professional wrestling matches that involved wrestlers from pre-existing rivalries, plots and storylines that were played out on World Wide Wrestling, Pro and World Championship Wrestling–Jim Crockett Promotions (JCP)'s television programs. Wrestlers portrayed a hero, villain or a tweener as they followed a series of events that built tension, and culminated in a wrestling match or a series of matches. The main rivalry heading into the event was between Ric Flair and Lex Luger for the NWA World Heavyweight Championship. Luger was a member of Flair's group Four Horsemen since 1987 but left the group in 1988 after he thought that he was being held back. Luger became the top fan favorite of the company and Horsemen's top rival. On Clash of the Champions I on March 27, Luger and Barry Windham defeated Horsemen members Arn Anderson and Tully Blanchard to win the NWA World Tag Team Championship. On the April 23 edition of World Championship Wrestling, Luger and Windham lost the title to Anderson and Blanchard when Windham turned on Luger and joined the Four Horsemen. Luger continued his rivalry with the Horsemen, resulting in Luger becoming the #1 contender for the NWA World Heavyweight Championship held by Flair.

The main tag team rivalry heading into the event was between The Fantastics (Bobby Fulton and Tommy Rogers) and Midnight Express (Bobby Eaton and Stan Lane) for the NWA United States Tag Team Championship. On Clash of the Champions I on March 27, Midnight Express defended the NWA United States Tag Team Championship against Fantastics. Fantastics initially won the titles but the decision was reversed as Fulton had thrown the referee before the pinfall, resulting in Eaton and Lane retaining the titles. On May 14 edition of World Wide Wrestling, Fantastics defeated Midnight Express to win the titles. On June 11 edition of World Championship Wrestling, it was announced that Fantastics would defend the title against Midnight Express at The Great American Bash.

A secondary rivalry heading into the event was between Barry Windham and Dusty Rhodes for the NWA United States Heavyweight Championship. On April 15, Rhodes was stripped of the NWA United States Heavyweight Championship and suspended for 120 days due to attacking NWA President Jim Crockett. On May 13, a tournament occurred for the vacated title. Barry Windham defeated Nikita Koloff in the finals of the tournament to win the title. On June 8 Clash of the Champions II: Miami Mayhem, Rhodes and Sting competed against Arn Anderson and Tully Blanchard for the NWA World Tag Team Championship. The match resulted in a double disqualification after the referee was attacked and Ric Flair and Windham interfered in the match. Windham attacked Rhodes outside the ring. On June 11 edition of World Championship Wrestling, it was announced that Rhodes would challenge Windham for the United States Championship at The Great American Bash.

Another secondary rivalry heading into the event was between Jimmy Garvin and Kevin Sullivan. On the March 27 edition of Clash of the Champions I, Sullivan's Varsity Club teammate Mike Rotunda defeated Garvin in a College Rules match to retain the NWA World Television Championship. At the 3rd Annual Jim Crockett, Sr. Memorial Cup Tag Team Tournament, Garvin defeated Sullivan in a Prince of Darkness match. On June 8 Clash of the Champions II, Garvin and his brother Ronnie Garvin defeated Rick Steiner and Rotunda in a tag team match. After the match, Sullivan, Steiner and Rotunda attacked the Garvins, resulting in Steve Williams making the save for Garvins. Williams became an ally of the Garvins against Sullivan and Rotunda. On the other side, The Road Warriors were scheduled to compete against The Powers of Pain in a series of Scaffold matches but Powers of Pain left the company and were replaced by Ivan Koloff and Russian Assassin. On June 11 edition of World Championship Wrestling, a Tower of Doom match was announced to take place between a team of Jimmy Garvin and a team of Sullivan. Road Warriors were added to Garvin's team and Koloff and Assassin were added to Sullivan's team.

Other on-screen personnel
Role:	Name:
Commentator	Jim Ross
Commentator	Tony Schiavone
Referee	Dick Woehrle
Referee	Tommy Young
Interviewer	Bob Caudle
Ring announcer	Gary Michael Cappetta

== Event ==
Before the event aired live on PPV, Rick Steiner and Dick Murdoch defeated Tim Horner and Kendall Windham in a non-televised tag team match.

=== Preliminary matches ===
As the event began, the first match was a tag team match for the NWA World Tag Team Championship. Arn Anderson and Tully Blanchard defended the titles against Sting and Nikita Koloff. Sting and Koloff dominated the earlier action against Anderson and Blanchard. Sting and Koloff double-teamed Anderson and Blanchard for most of the match until Blanchard took the control of the match in his side by injuring Koloff and tagging in Anderson. Anderson and Blanchard controlled the match briefly until Sting and Koloff regained their momentum. Sting dominated Anderson and Blanchard throughout the end of the match and Sting applied a Scorpion Deathlock on Blanchard but Blanchard held the ropes until the 20–minute time limit expired. As a result, Anderson and Blanchard retained the titles. The next match was for the NWA United States Tag Team Championship. The Fantastics (Bobby Fulton and Tommy Rogers) defended the titles against Midnight Express (Bobby Eaton and Stan Lane). Midnight Express's manager Jim Cornette was locked and suspended high in a steel cage and fastened in a straight jacket. The match stipulated that if Fantastics won, they would get the opportunity to whip Cornette ten times with a belt. Cornette tried to involve himself into the match on several occasions but failed. The match went back and forth with the challengers double teaming Fulton. Rogers was tagged in and he battled Eaton and Lane. Lane had a steel chain wrapped around his hand was about to hit Tommy Rogers but Rogers back-body dropped Lane making Lane drop the steel chain. Eaton picked up the steel chain and wrapped it around his fist. Fulton was unaware of it which allowed Eaton to attack Fulton with the chain and pin him to win the titles.

The third match of the event was a Tower of Doom match pitting The Road Warriors (Hawk and Animal), Steve Williams, Jimmy Garvin and Ron Garvin against Kevin Sullivan, Mike Rotunda, Al Perez, Russian Assassin and Ivan Koloff. Two wrestlers started the match out on top of the cage for a two-minute period. After that period, a trap door in both the top-tier cages opened for fifteen seconds which allowed a locked wrestler to get down into the cage below with all the other wrestlers. The object of the match was to unlock the door and escape out to the floor. Jimmy Garvin's valet Precious held the key to the door. Ron Garvin and Ivan Koloff started the match. The match went back and forth with both teams exchanging blows. In the end of the match, Jimmy Garvin and Kevin Sullivan were in the ring. Sullivan grabbed Precious but Garvin rescued her by attacking him and performed a Brainbuster, which he called Bombs Away, on Sullivan. Sullivan eventually shoved Garvin out of the cage. As a result, Garvin's team won. However, Sullivan locked the cage door to lock himself with Precious. Hawk made the rescue by performing a Flying Clothesline on Sullivan.

=== Main event matches ===
The final match on the undercard was for the NWA United States Heavyweight Championship. Barry Windham defended the title against Dusty Rhodes. Rhodes dominated Windham in the beginning by performing a Shoulder Block. Rhodes continued to perform several moves on Windham until the action spilled to the outside of the ring where Windham tried to perform a Piledriver on Rhodes but Rhodes countered it with a Clothesline. The action returned to the ring where Rhodes fought Windham until Windham's manager J. J. Dillon distracted Rhodes, allowing Windham to take advantage and attack Rhodes. Windham applied a Clawhold on Rhodes and started getting near-falls. Rhodes eventually fought out of the Clawhold and tried to apply a Figure Four Leglock but Windham countered and applied another Clawhold. Rhodes eventually climbed the corner to prevent Windham for getting the leverage and tried to perform a Superplex but Rhodes pushed him into the referee. Rhodes performed a Bionic Elbow on Windham and attempted to pin him but the referee was knocked out. Ron Garvin interfered in the match and attacked Rhodes with a Punch. Dillon woke up the referee and Windham pinned Rhodes to retain the title. The main event was between Ric Flair and Lex Luger for the NWA World Heavyweight Championship. Luger dominated Flair for much of the earlier part of the match by overpowering him by performing powerful moves. Flair eventually gained momentum by chasing Luger outside the ring where he smashed his head with the guard rail several times. The two returned to the ring where Flair started attacking Luger's ribs until Luger regained momentum. However, Flair took the control of the match on his side by attacking Luger's legs. Flair applied a Figure Four Leglock on Luger until Luger reversed the hold. Luger then performed a Clothesline on Flair, which sent Flair outside the ring. The two continued to battle outside the ring until the action returned to the ring. Flair tried to use a steel chair but the referee prevented Flair from using the chair. Luger took advantage of the situation by performing a Powerslam and applied a Backbreaker Rack, which he called Torture Rack, on Flair to win the title. However, it was announced that the match was stopped due to Luger's excessive bleeding, citing Maryland State Athletic Commission guidelines. As a result, Flair retained the title.

== Aftermath ==
Jim Crockett Promotions was suffering a downfall and was losing the competition against their main rivals, the World Wrestling Federation (WWF). In November 1988, the promotion was sold to media mogul Ted Turner and was replaced with a new promotion, World Championship Wrestling (WCW). In turn, the 1988 Great American Bash would be the final Great American Bash held by JCP, with future events held by WCW until WCW was acquired by the WWF in March 2001; the WWF would then be renamed to World Wrestling Entertainment (WWE) in 2002 and then reintroduced The Great American Bash as their own event in 2004. Ric Flair and Lex Luger continued their rivalry for the NWA World Heavyweight Championship. Luger received a rematch for the title at Starrcade, when Flair defeated Luger again to retain the title.

After defeating The Fantastics for the NWA United States Tag Team Championship at The Great American Bash, Midnight Express became the #1 contenders for the NWA World Tag Team Championship. On September 10, Midnight Express defeated Arn Anderson and Tully Blanchard to win the World Tag Team title. As a result, they vacated the US Tag Team title. The US Tag Team title was decided in a tournament, with the finals taking place between Fantastics and the team of Ron Simmons and Eddie Gilbert on the December 7 Clash of the Champions IV. Fantastics won the title for a second time. At Starrcade, Kevin Sullivan and Steve Williams defeated Fantastics to win the title.

Arn Anderson and Tully Blanchard left JCP for the WWF after their title loss to the Midnight Express, joining manager Bobby Heenan and becoming The Brain Busters. Nikita Koloff would take a sabbatical due to the illness of his wife Mandy (who would pass away in 1989) and miss a match at Starrcade with his kayfabe uncle Ivan Koloff in his feud with Paul Jones and the Russian Assassins.

While in the tag team division, The Road Warriors turned on their NWA World Six-Man Tag Team Championship partner Dusty Rhodes in October, resulting in the titles being vacated. On October 29, Road Warriors defeated Midnight Express to win the NWA World Tag Team Championship. Rhodes formed a tag team with Sting and they became the #1 contenders for the World Tag Team title. They received an opportunity against Road Warriors at Starrcade, but the champions retained the title by disqualification.

Bam Bam Bigelow entered WCW in late 1988 and earned an opportunity for the NWA United States Heavyweight Championship against Barry Windham at Starrcade. Windham retained the title by countout. Meanwhile, two villainous wrestlers turned into fan favorites. Ivan Koloff was the first one who left Paul Jones' Army and formed a tag team with Junkyard Dog to feud with Russian Assassins and competed against them in a losing effort at Starrcade. The second was Rick Steiner, who left The Varsity Club and began feuding with his stablemate Mike Rotunda for the NWA World Television Championship. At Starrcade, Steiner defeated Rotunda for the TV title.

Ron Garvin would align with Gary Hart and begin a feud with Dusty Rhodes, but then Garvin would leave JCP in August 1988 due to a booking dispute (Jim Ross/Tony Schiavone claimed on an episode of World Championship Wrestling he would be out of wrestling for six months due to a fictional altercation outside the ring with Rhodes), spend a short time in the AWA, still as a heel feuding with Greg Gagne over the AWA International Television Championship before going back to a fan favorite, arriving in the WWF as "Rugged" Ronnie Garvin in late 1988 and beginning a feud with Greg Valentine. His (kayfabe) brother Jimmy Garvin would be "injured" by Kevin Sullivan and Mike Rotunda on a taping of World Championship Wrestling where Sullivan would drop two cement blocks on Garvin's ankle, resulting in a (kayfabe) broken ankle. After several months, Garvin would return (without Precious) and join Michael Hayes and Terry Gordy in reforming The Fabulous Freebirds.

After Ron Garvin left JCP, Dusty Rhodes got into a feud with his old nemesis Gary Hart, Al Perez, Larry Zbyszko, and Kevin Sullivan, wrestling in a series of dog-collar matches on the house show circuit through October–November and reunited with Dick Murdoch to reform the Texas Outlaws tag team that wreaked havoc across the NWA in the 1960s-1970s.

== Results ==
No.	Results	Stipulations	Times
1^{ME}	Dick Murdoch and Rick Steiner defeated Kendall Windham and Tim Horner	Tag team match	4:35
2	Arn Anderson and Tully Blanchard (c) (with J. J. Dillon) vs. Nikita Koloff and Sting ended in a time limit draw	Tag team match for the NWA World Tag Team Championship	20:00
3	The Midnight Express (Bobby Eaton and Stan Lane) (with Jim Cornette) defeated The Fantastics (Bobby Fulton and Tommy Rogers) (c)	Tag team match for the NWA United States Tag Team Championship	16:23
4	The Road Warriors (Animal and Hawk), Steve Williams, Ron and Jimmy Garvin (with Precious) defeated Al Perez, Ivan Koloff, Kevin Sullivan, Mike Rotunda and The Russian Assassin (with Gary Hart and Paul Jones)	Tower of Doom match	19:55
5	Barry Windham (c) (with J. J. Dillon) defeated Dusty Rhodes	Singles match for the NWA United States Heavyweight Championship	15:55
6	Ric Flair (c) (with J. J. Dillon) defeated Lex Luger by referee stoppage	Singles match for the NWA World Heavyweight Championship	23:13
(c) / – the champion(s) heading into the match; ME / – the match was broadcast prior to the pay-per-view on Main Event
