= List of former World Championship Wrestling personnel =

This is a list of professional wrestlers and personalities that performed in World Championship Wrestling from 1988 to 2001. They are listed in alphabetical order by last name. For alumni of pre-WWE promotion Jim Crockett Promotions, see List of former Jim Crockett Promotions personnel.

Deceased individuals are indicated with a dagger (†).

== Alumni ==
Birth Name	Ring Name(s)	Tenure(s)	
David Abbott	Tank Abbott	1999	2000
Brian Adams †	Brian Adams	1998	2001
Christopher Adams †	Chris Adams	1997	1999
William Afflis Jr. †	Dick the Bruiser	1989	1991
Gary Albright †	Gary Albright	1990	1990
Brandi Alexander	Brandi Alexander	1999	2000
Michael Alfonso †	Mike Awesome	2000	2001
Terry Allen	Magnum T. A.	1984	1986
Randall Alls	Randy Rose	1988	1989
Chae An	Nitro Girl Chae	1997	2001
Samula Anoa'i	Samu	1989	1990
Bradley Anderson	Brad Anderson	1989–1990	1994
Chiquita Anderson	Nitro Girl Chiquita	2000	2001
Randall Anderson †	Pee Wee Anderson; Randy Anderson	1988	1999
Roger Anderson	Roger Boone	1997	1997
Steven Anderson (Note: Although born with the family name Anderson, his name was changed to Williams in early childhood when he was adopted by his stepfather.)	"Stunning" Steve Austin	1991	1995
Frank Andersson †	Frank Andersson	1989	1990
Mike Anthony	Mike Anthony	1995	1997
Scott Antol	Scott Studd; Scotty Riggs	1993	1999
Yoshihiro Asai	Último Dragón	1996	1998
Christopher Ashford-Smith †	Yoshi Kwan; Chris Champion	1987-1988	1993
Mark Ashford-Smith †	Mark Starr	1993–1994	1995–1998
Fred Avery	Fred Avery	1990s	1990s
Shohei Baba †	Giant Baba	1987	1987
Kimberly Bacon	Kimberly Page; Booty Babe; Diamond Doll	1994	2000
Marcus Bagwell	Buff Bagwell; Marcus Bagwell; Marcus Alexander Bagwell	1991	2001
Jennifer Bancale	Nitro Girl Sapphire; Nitro Girl Starr	2000	2001
Juan Baños	Lizmark Jr.	1997	1999
Wendy Barlow	Fifi the French Maid	1993	1994
Thomas Barrett	Tommy Angel	1988	1991
Douglas Becker	Adam Flash	1995	1995
James Bednarski	Scott Putski	1988	1998-1999
Stephanie Bellars	Gorgeous George	1998	1999
Melissa Bellin	Nitro Girl Spice	1997	2000
Tom Beninghaus	Tough Tom	1997	2001
Christopher Benoit †	Chris Benoit	1992–1993	1995–2000
Brian Bernick	Jet Jaguar	1996	1997
Scott Bigelow †	Bam Bam Bigelow	1988–1989	1990; 1998–2001
Luther Biggs	Luther Biggs	1996–1997	1999
Adam Birch	Joey Matthews	1999	1999
Eric Bischoff	Eric Bischoff	1991	1999; 2000; 2001
Trevor Blanchard	Trevor Allen	1997	1998
Richard Blood	Ricky Steamboat	1977-1985	1989; 1991-1994
Wayne Bloom	Wayne Bloom	1990	1997-1998
Terri Boatwright	Alexandra York	1988	1991
Michael Bollea	Horace Boulder; Horace Hogan; Horace	1997	2000
Terry Bollea †	"Hollywood" Hulk Hogan	1994	2000
Tommy Bonds	Tommy Bonds	1996	1996
Johnny Boone	Johnny Boone	1996	1999
Steve Borden	Sting	1986	1987-2001
Thomas Boric	Haito	1994	1994
Todd Bradford	Todd Champion	1986-1987	1991-1993; 1997
Thomas Brandi	Johnny Gunn	1994	1995
William Brenneman	Jerry Flynn	1996	2000
Chad Brock	Chad Brock	1994	1996
Robert Brooks	Robbie Brookside	1997	1998
Jason Broyles	Jason Jett	2001	2001
Denny Brown	Denny Brown	1993	1994-1997
DeWayne Bruce	Sgt. Buddy Lee Parker; Braun the Leprechaun; Jack Boot; DeWayne Bruce; Sarge	1989	2001
Joseph Bruce	Violent J	1999	2000
Terry Brunk †	Sabu	1995	1995
Tylene Buck	Major Gunns	1999	2001
Dave Burkhead	Dave Burkhead	1999	2000
Ronald Bustamante	Boom Boom Busti	1995	1997
Adrian Byrd	Adrian Byrd	1999	2000
Teri Byrne	Nitro Girl Fyre	1997	1999
Bradley Cain	Lodi; Idol; Rave	1997	2000
Mark Calaway	Mean Mark; Mean Mark Callous	1989	1990
David Canal	Cuban Assassin; Fidel Sierra; El Diablo; El Cubano; Hitman; David Sierra; Fidel Barrio; The Terrorist; Top Gun	1978-1980	1982; 1984; 1987; 1989-1991; 1993-2000
Christopher Candito †	Chris Candido	2000	2000
Ray Canty †	Ray Candy	1981	1984-1986; 1988-1989
Mark Canterbury	Mark Canterbury; Shanghai Pierce	1992	1994
Leonard Carlson	Lane Carlson; Lenny Lane	1997	2000
Tony Carr	Tony Carr	1995	2001
Leonardo Carrera	Damien; Galaxy	1996	1999
Elvin Carter	T.C. Carter	Early 1990s	Late 1990s
Sean Casey	Steve Casey; K.C. Sunshine	1995	1997
David Cash	Cash	2001	2001
Paul Centopani	Paul Roma	1993	1995
Masahiro Chono	Masahiro Chono	1991-1992	1994-1998; 2000
Bryan Clark	Nightstalker; Bryan Clark; Wrath	1990-1991	1997-2001
Jean Clarke	Lady Blossom	1991	1991
Charles Coates †	Chuck Coates; Madd Maxx; German Stormtrooper No.#2; Russian Assassin	1990	1992
Kent and Keith Cole	The Cole Twins	1993	1994
Randall Colley †	Moondog Rex; Randy Colley; Black Scorpion; Dr. X Deadeye Dick; The Shadow	1976	1983; 1988; 1990-1991
Dennis Condrey †	Dennis Condrey	1988	1989
Bob Cook	Bob Cook	1989	1994
Adam Copeland	Damon Striker	1996	1996
Richard Cornell	Rick Cornell; Reno	1999	2001
James Cornette	Jim Cornette	1985	1990; 1993
Thomas Couch †	Tommy Rogers	1986	1988-1989; 1994-1996; 2000
Daniel Covell	Christopher Daniels	2000	2001
James Cox	James Black; James Storm	2000	2001
Jamie Cragwall	Nitro Girl Naughty-A	2000	2001
Amy Crawford	Nitro Girl A.C. Jazz	1997	1999
Ann-Marie Crooks	Midnight	1999	2000
James Cruikshanks	J. C. Ice	1999	2000
Joe Cruz	Joe Cruz	1992	1993
Rebecca Curci	Nitro Girl Whisper	1997	1999
Fred Curry III	Fred Curry III	1999	2001
John Czawlytko †	Big Bad John; Max Muscle; Maxx	1993	1997
Joseph D'Acquisto	Roadblock	1996	1998
Scott D'Amore	Scott D'Amore	1993	1996
William Dannenhauer Jr.	The Equalizer; Dave Sullivan; Evad Sullivan	1991	1993-1996
Barry Darsow	Krusher Khrushchev; Barry Darsow; Blacktop Bully	1984-1987	1994-1995; 1997-1999
Marcial Davis	Marcial Davis	1999	2000
Ian Dean †	Doc Dean	1997	1998
William DeMott II	Hugh Morrus; Man of Question; Captain Rection; General Rection	1995	2001
Joey Denson	Joey Denson	1999	2000
Dina DeStefano †	Marie; Marie Lograsso	2000	2001
Dan Devine	Dan Devine	1999	N/A
Raymundo Díaz †	Villano V	1996	2000
Tomas Díaz	Villano IV	1996	2000
Theodore DiBiase	Ted DiBiase	1996	1999
Scott Dickinson	Scott Dickinson	1997	2000
David DiMeglio †	Dino Casanova	1995	1995
Katherine Dingman	Papaya	2000	2000
Nicholas Dinsmore	Nick Dinsmore	1998	1999
Stephen DiSalvo	The Minotaur	1990	1991
Alfred Dobalo †	Al Green; The Blade Hunter; Master Blaster Blade; Rage; The Dog	1989-1991	1993; 1998-2000
Steve Doll †	Steve Doll	1996	1996
Joseph Dorgan	Johnny Swinger	1995	1997-1999
James Duggan Jr.	Jim Duggan	1994	2001
Robert Duncam Jr. †	Bobby Duncum, Jr.	1998	2000
Michael Durham †	Johnny Rotten; Johnny Grunge	1988	1990; 1996-1998; 1999
Jeannie Durso	Little Jeannie; Little Jeanie	1999	2000
Robert Eaton †	Bobby Eaton; Robert Earl Eaton	1981	1985-2000
Paul Ellering	Paul Ellering	1986	1990
Michael Enos	The Masked Skyscraper; The Mauler; Mike Enos	1990	1996-1999
William Fritz Ensor †	Buddy Landel	1990	1991
Carlos Espada	Konnan	1990	1996–2001
Sean Evans †	Shocker Sean Evans	1998	1999
Lance Evers	Lance Storm	2000	2001
Sidney Eudy †	Sid Vicious	1989-1991	1993; 1999-2001
Lou Fabiano	Lou Fabiano	1991	1992
Page Falkinberg Jr.	Diamond Dallas Page	1991–1992	1993–2001
Jeffrey Farmer	nWo Sting; Cobra	1993	1994; 1995–2000
Solofa Fatu Jr.	Fatu	1989	1990
Samuel Fatu	The Samoan Savage	1989	1990
John Faulkner	John Faulkner	1990s	1990s
Raymond Fernandez †	Assassin #2; Super Invader	1983-1984	1992
Edward Ferrera	Oklahoma	1999	2001
David Ferrier †	Jimmy Backlund; Jimmy Graffiti; Jim Richland	1985	1987; 1996
Wayne Ferris	Honky Tonk Man	1994	1994
Tonga Fifita	Meng	1994	2001
David Finlay Jr.	Belfast Bruiser; Fit Finlay	1996	2001
David Fliehr	David Flair	1998	2001
Richard Fliehr (Note: Flair was named Richard Fliehr when he was adopted in infancy through the scandal-ridden Tennessee Children's Home Society, and does not definitively know his birth name.)	Ric Flair	1974–1991	1993–1998; 1998–2001
Michael Foley	Cactus Jack	1989–1990	1991–1994
Christopher Ford	Devon Storm; Crowbar	1996-1997	1999-2001
Chad Fortune	Chad Fortune	1997	1999
Peggy Lee Fowler †	Peggy Lee Leather	1990	1997
Domingo Fuentes	Mascarita Sagrada	1996	1996
Tatsumi Fujinami	Tatsumi Fujinami	1991	1992
Richard Fuller	Rick Fuller	1997	2000
James Fullington	Hardcore Hak	1998	1999
Allan Funk	Alan Funk; Kwee Wee	1999	2001
Terrance Funk †	Terry Funk	1971-1973	1975-1976; 1980; 1983; 1985; 1989; 1994; 2000-2001
Douglas Furnas †	Doug Furnas	1990	1990
Jeffrey Gann	The Gambler; Jeff Gamble	1990	1999
Rafael García	Super Caló	1996	1999
Randy Gaskins	DJ Ran	1999	2001
Terrance Gerin	Terry Richards	1995	1995
James Gibson	Jamie Howard; Jamie-San; Jamie Knoble	1999	2001
Douglas Gilbert	Doug Gilbert	1989	1989
Thomas Gilbert, Jr.†	Eddie Gilbert	1987	1990
Glenn Gilberti	Disco Inferno; Hip Hop Inferno; Disqo	1995	2001
James Golden	Bunkhouse Buck	1994	1997
William Goldberg	Bill Gold; Bill Goldberg	1997	2001
Joe Gomez	Alan Iron Eagle; Joe Gomez	1990–1991	1996–1999
César González ^{†}	Silver King	1992	1997-2000
Eduardo González	Juventud Guerrera	1996	2000
Jorge González †	El Gigante	1988	1992
Terry Gordy †	Terry Gordy	1981-1982	1984; 1986-1987; 1989; 1992
George Gray	One Man Gang	1982-1984	1986-1987; 1991; 1995-1996
Sam Greco	Sam Greco	2001	2001
Richard Greene †	Johnny Attitude	1996	1999
Nora Greenwald	Starla Saxon; Miss Madness; Mona	1999	2000
Peter Gruner	Kid Flash; Billy Cannon; Billy Kidman	1996	2001
Salvador Guerrero IV	Chavo Guerrero Jr. Lieutenant Loco	1996	2001
Eduardo Guerrero †	Eddie Guerrero	1989/1991	1995–2000
Héctor Guerrero	Hector Guerrero; Lazer Tron	1986-1987	1989-1990; 1996-1997
Mark Guthrie	Mark Guthrie	1998	1999
Óscar Gutiérrez	El Nino; Rey Misterio, Jr. Rey Mysterio, Jr.	1996	2001
Roberto Gutiérrez	El Dandy	1997	2000
Emory Hale †	Emory Hail; The Machine	1998	2000
Sean Haire †	Sean O'Haire	2000	2001
Scott Hall †	Diamond Studd; Scott Hall	1989; 1991–1992	1996–2000
Joseph Hamilton †	Jody Hamilton	1988	2001
Nicholas Hamilton Jr.	Nick Hamilton; Nick Patrick	1988	2001
Bret Hamner	Bret Hamner	1998	1999
John S. Hansen	Stan Hansen	1990	1991
Yumi Harashima	Cutie Suzuki	1995	1995
Judith Hardee	Judy Martin	1991	1991
Barry Hardy	Barry Hardy	1995	1995
Neal Hargrove	Reno Riggins	1990	1990
Brian Lee Harris	Brian Lee	1990	1991
Christopher Harris	Chris Harris	2000	2001
Donald and Ronald Harris	Patrick and Gerald Harris	1999	2001
James Harris ^{†}	Kamala	1995	1995
Richard Harris ^{†}	Big Train Bart	1995	1997
Bret Hart	Bret Hart	1997	2000
Gary Hart †	Gary Hart	1988	1990
James Hart	Jimmy Hart	1994	2001
Owen Hart †	Owen Hart	1991	1991
Hiroshi Hase	Hiroshi Hase	1991-1992	1994-1995
Donald Haviland †	Hack Meyers	1997	1997
Sarkis Hazzouri	Sarkis Hazzouri	1998	1999
Michael Hayner	Prince Iaukea; The Artist	1995	2000
Kazuhiro Hayashi	Shiryu; Kaz Hayashi	1997	2001
David Heath	David Heath	1997	1997
Gary Hedrick	Jeeves; Wildcat Willie	1995	1999
Michael Hegstrand †	Road Warrior Hawk	1983-1990	1993-1996
Raymond Heenan †	Bobby Heenan	1994	2000
James Hellwig †	Warrior	1998	1998
Gregory Helms	Shane Helms	1999	2001
Curtis Hennig †	Curt Hennig	1986	1997-2000
James Herd †	Jim Herd	1988	1992
Paul Heyman	Paul E. Dangerously	1988	1992
Melissa Hiatt	Missy Hyatt	1990	1994
Brian Hildebrand †	Mark Curtis	1996	1999
Mark Hildreth †	Van Hammer; Hammer; Major Stash	1991-1993	1994; 1997-2000
James Hines	Bobby Fulton	1986	1988-1990; 1994-1996
Harold Hogue †	Ice Train; M.I. Smooth	1993-1994	1996-1997; 2000-2001
Ian Hodgkinson	El Vampiro; Vampiro	1998	2000
Barry Horowitz	Barry Horowitz	1990	1997-2000
Malia Hosaka	Malia Hosaka	1996	1998
Robert Howard	Bob Holly	1990	1991
Scott Hudson	Scott Hudson	1998	2001
Robert Huffman	Kole; Booker; Booker T G.I. Bro	1989	1993-2001
Lash Huffman	Kane; Stevie Ray	1989	1991; 1993-2001
Curtis Hughes	Big Cat; Mr. Hughes; Curtis Hughes	1990	1992
Elizabeth Hulette †	Miss Elizabeth	1996	2000
Jonathan Hugger	Johnny The Bull	1999	2001
Gregory John Hunke	Gregory John Hunke	1997	1998
April Hunter	April Hunter	1999	2000
Curtis Iaukea †	King Curtis; The Master	1979	1995
Christopher Irvine	Chris Jericho	1996	1999
Kanji Inoki †	Antonio Inoki	1994	1995
Bill Irwin	Bill Irwin; The Black Scorpion	1989–1991	1993
Glenn Jacobs	Bruiser Mastino	1993	1993
Bradley James †	Brad Armstrong; Badstreet; Arachnaman; Buzzkill	1991–1995	1997–2001
Brian James	Brian Armstrong	1993	1993
Joseph Melton James †	Bob Armstrong	1996	1996
Joseph Scott James	Scott Armstrong	1992	2001
Steven James	Steve Armstrong	1990	1992; 1995–2000
Fredrick Jannetty	Marty Jannetty	1998	1998
Jeffrey Jarrett	Jeff Jarrett	1996–1997	1999–2001
James Janos	Jesse Ventura	1992	1994
Mark Jindrak	Mark Jindrak	1999	2001
Allen Jones	A.J. Styles; Air Styles	2001	2001
Michael Jones †	Curly Bill; Vincent; Mike Jones; Mr. Jones; Shane	1996	2000
Paul Jones †	Paul Jones	1973	1989
Reuben Kane	Robert Gibson	1983	1985-1988; 1990-1992; 1993; 1996-1997; 2000
Koji Kanemoto	Koji Kanemoto	1995	1995
Kim Kanner	Shakira	1999	2000
Daryl Karolat	Big Sky	1989	1993
William Kazmaier	Bill Kazmaier	1991	1991
Stacy Keibler	Stacy Keibler; Miss Hancock; Nitro Girl Skye	1999	2001
Stephen Keirn	Steve Keirn	1975-1976	1986-1987; 1994
Robert Kellum	Gorgeous George III; The Maestro	1993	1995; 1997-2000
Kenny Kendall	Kenny Kendall	1992	1993
Wayne Keown	Dutch Mantel	1990	1991
Mike Khoury	Mike Khoury	1990s	1990s
Elaine and Diane Klimaszewski	Nitro Girls Silver and Gold; Lolli and Pop	1999	2000
Christopher Klucsaritis †	Chris Kanyon; Mortis	1995	2001
Robert Knapik	Robbie Rage	1996	1998
Dennis Knight	Tex Slazenger	1989	1994
Yasuhiro Kojima †	Hiro Matsuda	1987	1989
Ivan Koloff †	Ivan Koloff	1984	1989
Viktor Kruger	Viktor Kruger	1991	1994
Katsumasa Kuroki	Tokyo Magnum; Magnum TOKYO	1998	1998
Mark Kyle	Killer Kyle	1995	1997
Terrance Ladd	Mustafa Saed	1992	1993
Nick Lambros	Nick Lambros	1998	1999
Franklin Lancaster	Frankie Lancaster	1993–1995	1995–2000
Wallace Lane	Stan Lane	1987	1990
Kristina Laum	Leia Meow	1999	2001
Joseph Laurinaitis †	Road Warrior Animal	1982-1990	1993; 1996; 2001
John Laurinaitis	Johnny Ace; Dick Grayson	1987-1990	1993; 2000-2001
Mark LeRoux	Lash LeRoux; Corporal Cajun	1997	2001
Paul Levesque	Jean-Paul Levesque; Terra Ryzin	1994	1995
Edward Harrison Leslie	The Booty Man; Brother Bruti; Zodiac; The Disciple; The Man With No Face; The Man With No Name; The Butcher	1994	1999
Scott Levy	Raven; Scotty Flamingo	1992–1993	1997–1999
Thomas Lister Jr. †	Ze Gangsta	1996	1996
Raymond Lloyd	Ray Lloyd; Glacier; Coach Buzz Stern	1989	1996-1999; 2001
Lorenzo	Lorenzo	1997	1998
Vito LoGrasso	Big Vito	1999	2001
Jeremy Lopez	Jeremy Lopez	1999	2000
Uta Ludendorff	Uta Ludendorff	1999	1999
Martin Lunde	Arn Anderson	1984–1988	1989–2001
Jeremy Lynn	Jerry Lynn; Mr. JL; JL	1995	1997
Carmel Macklin	Ms. Jones; Nitro Girl Chameleon	1999	2001
Victor Mar Manuel †	Black Cat	1991; 1995	1998
Joseph Magliano †	Joey Maggs	1988	1998
Michael Manna	Stevie Richards	1997	1997
James Manley	Jim Powers	1991	1996-1998
Michael Maraldo	Ace Darling	1997	1997
Michael Marcello	Mike Marcello	1996	1996
Debra Marshall	Debra McMichael	1995	1997
Troy Martin	Shane Douglas	1987-1990	1992-1993; 1999-2001
Darren Matthews	Steven Regal	1991	1992-1998; 1999-2000
Edward McDaniel	Wahoo McDaniel	1974	1988; 1993; 1995
Stephen McMichael †	Steve McMichael	1995	1999
Shannon McNeill	Nitro Girl Baby	2000	2000
Marc Mero	Johnny B. Badd	1991	1996
Debrah Miceli	Madusa	1991–1993	1995–2001
Ernest Miller	Ernest Miller	1997	2001
Peter Miller †	Mongolian Mauler	1994	1994
Nathan Minton	Chip Minton	1996	1998-1999
James Mitchell	James Vanderberg	1997	1999
Michael Moran	Killer; Mean Mike	1997	2001
Rip Morgan	Rip Morgan	1987	1991
Jacqueline Moore	Jacquelyn	1997	1998
Michael Moore	The Motor City Madman	1990	1990
Shannon Moore	Shannon Moore	1999	2001
James Morrison	J.J. Dillon; James J. Dillon	1984-1989	1997-2000
Richard Morton	Richard Morton; Ricky Morton	1983	1985-1988; 1990-1992; 1993; 1996-1997
Louis Mucciolo Jr. †	Lou Taffiloni; Louie Spicolli	1989	1997-1998
Hoyt Murdoch †	Dick Murdoch	1974	1977-1978; 1986-1989; 1991; 1993; 1995
Keiji Mutoh	The Great Muta	1989-1998	2000
Yuji Nagata	Yuji Nagata	1997	1998
Chigusa Nagayo	Zero	1996	1996
Keiko Nakano	Bull Nakano	1995	1996
Nobuyoshi Nakamura	Little Dragon	1998	1998
Manabu Nakanishi	Kurasawa	1995	1996
Kevin Nash	Kevin Nash; Master Blaster Steele; Oz; Vinnie Vegas	1990–1992	1996–2001
James Neidhart †	Jim Neidhart	1993	1997–1999
Paul Neu	P. N. News	1988-1989	1991-1992
John Nord	John Nord	1997	1998
Anthony Norris	Big T	1999	2000
Charles Norris †	Charlie Norris	1993	1993
Harrison Norris	Hardbody Harrison	1995	2001
Kevin Northcutt	Kevin Northcutt	1997	2000
Scott Norton	Scott Norton	1991	1993; 1995-1999
Melinda O'Hearn	Midajah	1999	2001
Craig O'Malley	Craig O'Malley	Late 1990s	2001
Eugene Okerlund †	Gene Okerlund	1993	2001
Kazuo Onoo	Sonny Onoo	1994	1999
Scott Orlinger	Scotty Sabre	1999	2001
Paul Orndorff Jr. †	Paul Orndorff	1978-1979	1990; 1992-2000
Bob Orton, Jr.	Bob Orton, Jr.	1989	1989
Aldo Ortiz	Ricky Santana; Iceman; Ricky Barrio	1986-1989	1991-1992; 1994-1997; 1999
Manuel Ortiz	Ciclope; Halloween	1996	1999
Matthew Osborne †	Matt Borne; Big Josh	1980-1982	1991-1992
Nobuhiko Oshima	Cima	1998	1998
Fred Ottman	The Shockmaster	1993	1994
Shinjiro Otani	Shinjiro Otani	1994	1996
Carl Ouellet	Carl Oulette	1996	1997; 2000
Charles Palumbo	Chuck Palumbo	1999	2001
Frank Paris	Air Paris	2000	2001
Timothy Parker †	Powerhouse Parker; Tim Parker	1989	1991
Todd Passmore	Barry Houston	1994-1996	1997-1998
John Paul	John Paul	1990s	1990s
Ben Peacock	Mambo Warrior; Beast	1990	1992
Al Perez	Al Perez	1988	1989
Miguel Perez Jr.	Miguel Perez Jr.	1992	1996
Darryl Peterson	Maxx Payne	1993	1994
Theodore Petty †	Rocco Rock; The Cheetah Kid; Colonel DeKlerk; Mario Savoldi	1990	1996-1998; 1999
Allison Pfau	Nitro Girl Syren	2000	2001
Lawrence Pfohl	Lex Luger	1987–1992	1995–2001
Brian Pillman †	Brian Pillman	1989–1994	1994–1996
Craig Pittman	Sergeant Craig Pittman	1993	1997
Angelo Poffo †	Angelo Poffo	1995	1995
Lanny Poffo †	Lanny Poffo	1976-1977	1995–2001
Randall Poffo †	Randy Savage; Randy Poffo	1976-1977	1994-2000
Alexander Pourteau	Alex Porteau	1989-1990	1997
Dave Power	Dave Power	1991-1992	1998
Dean Power	Dean Power	1991-1992	1998
Harley Race †	Harley Race	1973; 1975-1986	1990; 1993
Riki Rachtman	Rikki Rachtman	1992	1999-2001
Michael Rapada	Mike Rapada	1997	2000
Theodore Reade	4x4 Kash	1999	2000
Robert Rechsteiner	Rick Steiner	1986-1992	1996-2001
Scott Rechsteiner	Scott Steiner	1988-1992	1996-2001
Bruce Reed †	Butch Reed	1986	1989-1992
Tayo Reed	Nitro Girl Tayo	1997	1998
Ronald Reis	Reese; Big Ron Studd; Super Giant Ninja; The Yeti; The Yet-Tay	1995-1996	1998
John Richardson	Johnny Rich	1989	1994
Thomas Richardson	Thomas Rich; Tommy Rich	1978	1981-1983; 1985-1986; 1989-1993
Denise Riffle	Chastity	1999	1999
John Riker †	Ralphus	1998	2000
Kenneth Rinehurst	The Russian Assassin #2; Jack Victory	1988	1991
Sylvester Ritter †	Junkyard Dog	1988	1993
Charles Robinson	Charles Robinson	1997	2001
James Rocha	Jim Steele	1993	1994
Bryant Rogowski	Bryant Anderson	1993	1993
Alan Rogowski †	Ole Anderson	1982–1987	1989–1993
Dean Roll	Shark Boy	1999	2000
Samuel Roman	Kid Romeo	1999-2000	2001
Christopher Romero †	Chris Youngblood	1990	1991
Mark Romero	Mark Youngblood	1990	1991
Richard Rood †	Rick Rude	1982	1985-1987; 1991-1994; 1997-1999
Patrick Rose	Pat Rose	1989	1994
James Ross	Jim Ross	1982	1993
Jeremiah Ross	Blitzkrieg	1998	1999
Robert Ross	Ranger Ross	1989	1991
Lawrence Michael Rotunda	VK Wallstreet; Michael Wallstreet; Mr. Wallstreet; Mike Rotundo; Mike Rotunda	1982-1984	1986-1991; 1995-2000
Jacques Rougeau Jr.	Jacques Rougeau	1996	1997
Wendell Rozier †	Death Row	1990	1992-1993
Martin Ruane †	Loch Ness	1996	1996
Dustin Runnels	Dustin Rhodes; Dustin Runnels; Seven	1988-1989	1991-1995; 1999-2000; 2001
Virgil Runnels Jr. †	Dusty Rhodes	1991-1998	1999; 2001
Sherri Russell †	Sensuous Sherri; Sister Sherri; Sherri Martel	1994-1997	2000
Vincent Russo	Vince Russo; The Powers That Be	1999	2000
Gary Sabaugh	Gary Quartanelli; Italian Stallion	1984	1993
Jerome Saganowich	Jerry Sags	1990	1993-1997
Hiroyuki Saito	Hiro Saito	1991	1994-1996
Masanori Saito †	Masa Saito	1982	1990-1991; 1995-1996
Kazuo Sakurada †	Kendo Nagasaki; Rising Sun #1	1985	1989-1990
David Sammartino	Bruno Sammartino Jr. David Sammartino	1980-1981	1996
Vanessa Sanchez	Nitro Girl Tygress; Tygress	1998	2001
Michael Sanders	Mike Sanders	1998	2001
Lawrence Santo	Larry Santo	1995	1997
Bob Sapp	Bob Sapp	2000	2001
Hisako Sasaki	Akira Hokuto	1995	1997
Kensuke Sasaki	Kensuke Sasaki	1991	1996
Meiko Satomura	Meiko Satomura	1996	1997
Perry Satullo	Saturn; Perry Saturn	1997	2000
Mark Sciarra	Rip Rogers	1985	1989-1995
Michael Seitz	Michael Hayes	1981-1982	1986-1988; 1989-1994
Patty Seymour	Leilani Kai; Patty Stone Grinder	1991	1996-1997; 1999
Michael Shaw †	Norman the Lunatic	1989	1991
David Sheldon †	Angel of Death; The Black Scorpion	1987	1991
Lawrence Shreve	Abdullah the Butcher	1981-1983	1985-1986; 1988-1992
Sonny Siaki	Sonny Siaki	1999	2000
William Sierra	Bill Alfonso	1979	1995
Ronald Simmons	Ron Simmons	1989	1994
Dean Simon	Dean Malenko	1993	1995-2000
Nelson Simpson	Nikita Koloff	1984-1988	1991-1992
Rhonda Sing †	The Monster Ripper; Nitro Girl Beef; Rhonda Sing	1999	2000
Charles Skaggs	2 Cold Scorpio	1992	1994
Elix Skipper	Skip Over; Elix Skipper	1999	2001
Richard Slater †	Dick Slater	1982-1986	1991-1996
Robert Smedley	Bobby Blaze	1997	1999
Aurelian Smith Jr.	Jake Roberts	1992	1992
David Smith †	Davey Boy Smith; British Bulldog	1993	1997–1998
Michael Smith	Sam Houston	1991	1991
Norman Smiley	Norman Smiley	1997	2001
Tracy Smothers †	Tracy Smothers	1987	1990-1992
Héctor Solano †	Hector Garza	1997	1999
Douglas Somerson †	Doug Somers	1991	1991
Jason Spence	Christian York	1999	2001
Charles Spencer	Tony Marinara	1999	2000
Gary Spivey	Gary Spivey	1995	1995
Daniel Spivey	Dan Spivey	1984-1985	1989-1992
Shannon Spruill †	Daffney	1999	2001
Robert Starr	Bobby Starr	1991	1995
Kenneth Stasiowski	Kenny Kaos	1996	1999
Ali Stevens	Ali Stevens	2000	2001
Herman Stevens, Jr.	J. Biggs	1999	2000
Shawn Stipich	Shawn Stasiak	2000	2001
Jake Strauss	Big Jake Strauss	1993	2000
Chris Sullivan	Chris Sullivan	1995	1995
Kevin Sullivan †	Kevin Sullivan; The Great Wizard; The Taskmaster	1987-1991	1994-2001
Sharmell Sullivan	Paisley; Nitro Girl Storm	1998	2001
John Sutton †	The Big Kahuna; Sir Oliver Humperdink; Big Daddy Dink	1982-1983	1988-1993
Robert Swenson †	Ultimate Solution	1996	1996
Tamara Sytch	Tammy Lynn Sytch	2000	2000
Robert Szatkowski	Robbie V	1992	1993
Debbie Szestecki	Debbie Combs	1996	1997
Terry Szopinski	The Warlord; Super Assassin #2	1986-1988	1995-1996
Keiji Takayama	Gedo	1997	1998
Patrick Tanaka	Pat Tanaka; El Gato; Tanaka-san	1985-1986	1994-1998
Ricky Tango	Ricky Tango	1990s	1990s
Adolfo Tapia	La Parka	1996	2000
William Tatum †	Chase Tatum	1998	1999
David Taylor	Dave Taylor	1993	1995-2000
Paul Taylor III	Terry Taylor	1981-1982	1985-1988; 1990-1992; 1993-1994; 1996-1998; 1999-2001
John Tenta Jr. †	Avalanche; Shark	1994	1997; 1999
Curtis Thompson	Firebreaker Chip	1987-1989	1991-1993; 1997
Scott Thompson	Colossal Kong; King Kong	1993	1993
Randall Thornton	Swoll	1999	1999
Christopher Tipton	Chris Nelson	1993	1996
Nancy Toffoloni †	Robin Green; Woman	1989–1990	1996–1997
Mike Tolbert	Mike Tolbert	1997	1999
Roderick Toombs †	Roddy Piper	1996	2000
Dale Torborg	Dale Torborg; The Demon	1998	2001
Dionisio Torres	Psychosis; Psicosis	1996	2000
Eric Tovey †	Lord Littlebrook		
Ray Traylor Jr. †	Big Bubba; Big Bubba Rogers; Ray Traylor; The Boss; Guardian Angel	1986-1987	1993-1998
Mark Truran	Mark Truran	1997	1998
Michael Tuite †	The Wall; Sgt. A.W.O.L.	1999	2001
Robert Turner III †	Ted Turner		
Toshie Uematsu	Toshie Uematsu	1997	1997
Joseph Utsler	Shaggy 2 Dope	1999	2000
Gertrude Vachon †	Luna Vachon	1997	1997
Romeo Valentino †	Romeo Valentino	1995	1995
Sione Vailahi	Konga the Barbarian; The Barbarian; Super Assassin #1	1984-1988	1992-1993; 1995-2000
Hossein Khosrow Ali Vaziri †	The Iron Sheik	1989	1991
Dale Veasey	Lieutenant James Earl Wright	1989	1996
Robert Vick	Sick Boy; Lance Ringo; Scott Vick	1996	1999
Richard Vigneault	Rick Martel	1998	1998
Tony Vincent	Tony Vincent	1990s	1990s
Frank Vizi	Bull Pain; Bill Payne	1993-1994	1996; 1998
Kevin Wacholz	The Prisoner	1985	1993; 1997-1998
Robert Walker	Bobby Walker	1992	2000
Brian Walsh	Billy Pearl	1997	1997
Sean Waltman	Syxx	1996	1998
Jeffrey Warner	Jeff Warner; JW Storm; The Silencer	1989-1990	1999
William Watts Jr.	Bill Watts	1992	1993
Erik Watts	Erik Watts	1992-1994	1998-1999
James Watts	Mikey Whipwreck	1999	1999
Alicia Webb	Symphony	1999	2000
Robert Welch	Colonel Robert Parker; Robert Parker	1991	1993-1997
Timothy Well †	Timothy Well	1996	1998
Mike Wenner	Mike Wenner	1993	1996
Pezavan Whatley †	Pez Whatley; Shaska Whatley; The Shadow	1983-1988	1992-1998
Lawrence Whistler	Larry Zbyszko	1975-1976	1985-1989; 1990-2000
Anthony White	Tony Atlas	1975-1981	1992-1993
Curtis White	Frog	1991	1993; 1997
Leon White †	Vader	1990	1995
Matthew Wiese	Horshu	1997	1998
Paul Wight II	The Giant	1995	1999
Del Wilkes †	The Patriot	1994	1995
James Williams	Jimmy Garvin	1977-1978	1986-1992; 1994
Patricia Williams	Precious	1986-1988	1992
Steven Williams †	Steve Williams	1987-1990	1999
Richard Wilson †	The Renegade	1995	1998
Torrie Wilson	Samantha; Torrie Wilson	1999	2000
Barry Windham	Barry Windham	1981-1982	1986-1994; 1998-1999
Kendall Windham	Kendall Windham	1987-1989	1993; 1997-1999
Gregory Wisniski	Greg Valentine	1976-1984	1992; 1996-1998
Brian Wohl	Julio Sanchez; Brian Wall	1995	1998
Christi Wolf	The Head Nurse; Double D Asya	1999	2000
Dusty Wolfe	Dusty Wolfe	1995	1998
Kelly Wolfe	Wolfie D	1999	2000
Alexander Wright	Alex Wright; Berlyn	1994	2001
Christopher Wright	C. W. Anderson	1998	1999
Itsuki Yamazaki	Itsuki Yamazaki	1991	1991
Keiichi Yamada	Keiichi Yamada; Jushin Thunder Liger	1991-1992	1995-1999
Brian Yandrisovitz	Brian Knobbs	1990	1993-1997; 1999-2000
Hiroyoshi Yamamoto	Tenzan	1995	1998
David Young	David Young	1995	1995
Masami Yoshida	Devil Masami	1997	1998
James Yun	Yun Yang	1999	2001
Thomas Zenk †	Tom Zenk; Z Man	1989	1994
Tsubasa	Tsubasa	1996	1996

== Other on-air personnel ==
- Miguel Alonzo (as a Spanish commentator)
- Nick Bockwinkel † (as a on-screen commissioner)
- Gary Michael Cappetta (as a ring announcer)
- David Penzer (as a ring announcer)
- Jimmy Baron (as a Road reporter and Co-host of Backstage Blast for WCW Monday Nitro (only on DirectTV))
- Jeremy Borash (as a WCW Live! host, Head writer, WCW.com writer, hotline host, announcer/commentator, Vince Russo's stooge and Co-host of Backstage Blast for WCW Monday Nitro (only on DirectTV))
- Michael Buffer (as a main event ring announcer)
- Keith Butler (as a ring announcer for WCW Saturday Night from 1999-2000)
- Bob Caudle † (as a commentator)
- Chris Cruise (as a commentator)
- Chad Damiani (as a WCW.com writer, WCW Hotline host and Co-host of Backstage Blast for WCW Monday Nitro (only on DirectTV), announcer/commentator, online consultant)
- Doug Dellinger (born Howard Douglas Dellinger) (as head of security)
- Lenita Erikson (as a sideline reporter)
- Rick Fansher (as a producer)
- Kip Allen Frey (as a Vice-President)
- Greg Gagne (as a road agent)
- Mike Graham (Mike Gossett) † (as a road agent)
- Sandra Gray (as a costume designer)
- Mickie Jay † (as a referee)
- Jerry Jarrett † (as a consultant)
- Jimmy Jett (as a referee)
- Slick Johnson (Mark Johnson) (as a referee)
- Rocky King (William Boulware, Jr.) † (as a referee)
- Craig Leathers (as a producer)
- Theodore Long (as a manager)
- Mark Madden (as a commentator)
- Lee Marshall † (as a commentator/interviewer)
- Mike Miller (as a producer)
- Pedro Morales † (as a Spanish commentator)
- Pamela Paulshock (as an interviewer and valet)
- Joe Pedicino † (as a broadcaster and producer)
- Jack Petrik (as President)
- Lance Russell † (as a commentator)
- Bob Ryder † (as a website manager)
- Dr. Harvey Schiller (as TBS executive)
- Tony Schiavone (as a commentator)
- Bill Shaw (as President)
- Gordon Solie † (as a lead commentator)
- Billy Silverman (as a referee)
- Mr. T (Lawrence Tero) (as a referee)
- Mike Tenay (as a commentator)
- Jamie Tucker (as a referee)
- Sir William (William Crookshanks) (as a manager)
- Tommy Young (as a referee)
