= WCW Power Plant =

American professional wrestling school

Coordinates: 33.8019°N 84.4383°W

- Industry: Professional wrestling school
- Founded: 1989
- Founder: Jody Hamilton
- Defunct: 2001
- Fate: ceased operations when WCW was purchased by WWE
- Headquarters: Atlanta, Georgia, United States
- Key people: Jody Hamilton (director); Paul Orndorff (manager); DeWayne Bruce (lead trainer); Debrah Miceli (trainer); Bill Goldberg (trainee)
- Owner: Time Warner
- Parent: World Championship Wrestling

The WCW Power Plant was a professional wrestling school in Atlanta, Georgia, owned and operated by World Championship Wrestling (WCW), a subsidairy of Time Warner.

The school was founded by wrestler Jody Hamilton, who opened the training center in 1989 in Lovejoy, Georgia. In 1991, it became the official school of WCW and relocated to Jonesboro, Georgia. By 1995, the school became known as the WCW Power Plant and relocated again, this time to Atlanta where Turner Broadcasting (the parent company of WCW) was headquartered. The school closed in March 2001 when WCW's assets were sold to the World Wrestling Federation (now known as WWE).

While the school had several successful trainees—including Bill Goldberg, Kevin Nash and Diamond Dallas Page—it was not a highly regarded training center in the wrestling industry. Wrestler Bret Hart, who was injured by Goldberg during a match, characterized the training at the Power Plant as dangerous to your opponent. Journalist Dave Meltzer wrote in 1999 that the school was "a total flop" because of their training emphasis on physical appearance over personality. In 2001, wrestler Molly Holly told Live Audio Wrestling, "the Power Plant focused on push-ups, running, sit-ups, squats, and people yelling at you." Other trainees, including William Regal and Bob Sapp, had positive experiences at the Power Plant.

== Operations ==
=== Jody Hamilton's school ===
The predecessor to the WCW Power Plant was a wrestling school founded in 1989 in Lovejoy, Georgia, by former wrestler Jody Hamilton. It became the official development school of World Championship Wrestling in 1991 and was relocated to Jonesboro, Georgia. Hamilton was employed by WCW until the company's dissolution in 2001. There was no tuition for the school. Hamilton would only train wrestlers who had a large physique or had already been trained in the fundamentals of working a match. Hamilton told Jeff Gelski of the St. Joseph News-Press in 1991 that he asked applicants just three questions to determine if they were worth training; their size, their age and their previous wrestling experience.

Kevin Nash, who trained under Hamilton, described the training facility as "half of a quonset hut where the other side of the building was carpet remnants". Nash has said that Hamilton's age limited the maneuvers he could teach, so much of his training focused on ring psychology. Early students of Hamilton include Nash, Jim Steele and Bryant Anderson. In 1991, Hamilton trained wrestler Mike Winner, who would later join the training staff of WCW Power Plant. Mike Graham began training students at Hamilton's school by 1992. He stayed on as a trainer when the school became the WCW Power Plant and worked there until its closure in 2001. Two early students of Graham were Marcus Bagwell and Van Hammer.

WCW sent Hamilton and former wrestler Blackjack Mulligan to scout talent at promotions around the United States. In 1993, the pair went to scout Championship Wrestling from Florida (CWF) wrestlers and hold tryouts at the Tampa Sportatorium in Tampa, Florida, for developmental contacts with WCW.

In 1993, WCW put on matches for small audiences at the Crystal Chandelier, a country western bar in Kennesaw, Georgia. The events gave students at Hamilton's school the opportunity to get in-ring experience before appearing on WCW television.

The school relocated near Atlanta, Georgia, in 1994. That year, Hamilton told Mark Binelli of The Atlanta Journal-Constitution that he received hundreds of phone calls a week from aspiring wrestlers. Hamilton explained his screening process, telling Binelli, "I really don't look at résumés a whole hell of a lot, except for size and experience. We get photos, we get videotapes. If I like them, they'll come in for a tryout." The interview was unique in that Hamilton partially broke kayfabe to explain the cooperative nature of professional wrestling maneuvers.

=== WCW Power Plant ===
The Power Plant was in operation as early as 1995. That year, WCW began charging students $2,500 in tuition. Prior to 1995, WCW covered the cost of training for wrestlers they wanted to develop. A segment for the television show Good Morning America on ABC was filmed from the Power Plant on June 18, 1995. WCW filed for the service mark for "Power Plant" on March 21, 1996. Paul Orndorff began managing the Power Plant in February 1998.

WCW formed a development deal in 1995 with the United States Wrestling Association (USWA), which was based in Memphis, Tennessee. Power Plant trainees, including Ron Reis, were sent to Memphis to get in-ring and television experience, as the USWA had a 36 station syndication deal. Reis and fellow trainee Bobby Walker were also allowed to work a match together for the small Georgia based promotion Peach State Wrestling on September 15, 1995. WCW occasionally ran house shows in small Georgia towns to give Power Plant trainees in-ring experience, the first being held in Canton on April 27, 1996 in front of 125 people.

Before his death in 1999, Tony Rumble was in negotiations to make his promotion, NWA New England, an official developmental territory of the WCW. The following year, WCW signed a developmental deal with Heartland Wrestling Association (HWA), which was an independent wrestling promotion based in Cincinnati, Ohio, run by Les Thatcher. The deal allowed Power Plant trainees to get in-ring experience at HWA events before appearing for WCW. WCW signed another development deal with NWA Wildside, which an independent promotion based in Cornelia, Georgia, owned by Bill Behrens. The deal officially began on November 18, 2000 at a show in Cornelia that featured Power Plant trainees Sam Greco, Bob Sapp and Robbie Rage.

Inland Productions, who served as the video game developer for WCW Nitro and WCW/nWo Thunder, used the Power Plant to shoot the motion capture for the games as well as the promos featured on the character select screen.

WCW briefly assigned some Power Plant trainees (including Sonny Siaki and Kid Romeo) to NWA Nashville in 2000. After a month in Nashville, WCW recalled their trainees to the Power Plant for an evaluation by Keiji Muto, who was scouting talent on behalf of New Japan Pro-Wrestling. Dusty Rhodes' promotion Turnbuckle Championship Wrestling (TCW), which was founded in 2000 and based in Marietta, Georgia, used a number of former WCW wrestlers and Power Plant trainees at their early events. Ray Lloyd, who trained at the Power Plant and was known best as Glacier in WCW, was the first TCW Heavyweight Champion.

Power Plant trainees would often appear on WCW programming as jobbers. They would sometimes feature prominently on the c-show WCW Saturday Night, as was the case with Chuck Palumbo in 2000. According to the Wrestling Observer Newsletter, trainees were required to work security at WCW Monday Nitro events and train at the Power Plant five days a week. They could sometimes be seen on-camera during Bill Goldberg's entrances.

The Power Plant was not only used by WCW to train new talent, but it also gave management the ability to bring veteran wrestlers in to rehab while contracts were negotiated. Wrestlers who regularly appeared on WCW programming could go to the Power Plant to test new maneuvers and use the training equipment. The Power Plant was also where wrestlers could go to run through matches they had scheduled for television or pay-per-view. When WCW brought in celebrities to wrestle, they were often sent to the Power Plant for training, as was the case with National Basketball Association players Karl Malone and Dennis Rodman. WCW used the Power Plant to develop their cruiserweight division in 1999.

WCW developmental territories
| Territory | Location | Year(s) |
|---|---|---|
| United States Wrestling Association | Memphis, TN | 1995–96 |
| NWA Nashville | Nashville, TN | 2000 |
| Heartland Wrestling Association | Cincinnati, OH | 2000 |
| NWA Wildside | Cornelia, GA | 2000–01 |

In late 2000, Figure Four Weekly reported that the contracts of Chuck Palumbo, Allan Funk, Elix Skipper, Reno and Johnny the Bull were effectively voided and they were put back on development deals. WCW also sought to recoup Power Plant tuition from the wrestlers.

The Power Plant was advertised on WCW Monday Nitro. Once a month open tryouts were held for applicants aged 18 to 29. If the applicants made it through the three day try-out phase they would earn an invitation to join the school at a cost of $3,000 for six months training. Male applicants had to be at least 5 ft 9 in (1.75 m) tall and 175 lb (79 kg) in weight.

While researching professional wrestling for a BBC documentary, journalist Louis Theroux visited the Power Plant. He volunteered to take part in some training in an effort to show respect for the business, but when he asked DeWayne Bruce questions about kayfabe, he was forced to do a strenuous exercise routine. At one stage, Bruce encouraged the other trainees to call him a cockroach while Theroux was struggling to regain his breath. Theroux was later shown vomiting on camera. Theroux later recalled, "Yes. I vomited while interviewing some wrestlers at the WCW Power Plant training academy. They had pressured me into a workout that I was patently unequipped to handle. I had had a greasy breakfast and pushed myself to the point of 'blowing chunks'—that's the term they used. And what was funny was Sarge, the head wrestler who was shouting at me, and who had been totally unimpressed by my physical efforts, was equally disappointed in my puking. He seemed to think it was too watery. He kept saying: 'That ain't nothing, blow chunks'."

==== Racial discrimination lawsuit ====
As part of a racial discrimination lawsuit filed in 2000 against WCW by wrestler Ricky Reeves, former Power Plant trainer Pez Whatley gave a deposition in which he claimed African American trainees had fewer opportunities within the company as compared to their Caucasian counterparts. Whatley recalled telling African American trainees upon entering the Power Plant that they would have to put in twice the effort as Caucasian trainees to get ahead. According to Whatley, J. J. Dillon prevented the careers of African American trainees from advancing within the company. WCW production staffer Moses Williams also claimed to observe bias against African American trainees.

Power Plant founder Jody Hamilton's alleged racist conduct was cited in the lawsuit as part of the institutional barriers African Americans faced at WCW. Hamilton's former assistant Brenda Smith, retired wrestler Thunderbolt Patterson, trainee Tony Carr and Whatley supplied depositions in which they claim Hamilton held bias against African Americans. Hamilton denied the accusations and claimed that Smith held racist bias against caucasians. Hamilton wrote in his autobiography, Assassin: The Man Behind the Mask, that Smith "thought that every black person in the world should have the same attitude, especially towards white people."

Former WCW referee Randy Anderson supplied a deposition in which he alleged Power Plant manager Paul Orndorff "hated" African Americans. Anderson, Carr and Sonny Ono (who had a separate racial discrimination lawsuit against WCW) said Orndorff used racial slurs to describe African American wrestlers.

Former Turner Broadcasting human resources manager Timothy Goodly identified a lack of diversity among WCW wrestlers and brought it to the attention of company president Eric Bischoff, who Goodly said assured him would be addressed by bringing in more minority trainees to the Power Plant. Goodly did not believe that any effort was subsequently made by Bischoff or WCW management to bring in more diverse trainees.

Wrestler Harrison Norris, who trained at the Power Plant and wrestled in WCW as Hardbody Harrison, also sued the company for racial discrimination. He alleged he paid the tuition and graduated from the Power Plant, but was not offered a long-term contract with WCW. Instead he was occasionally used as a jobber and worked on the ring crew, the latter Norris said he was not compensated for.

== Use in storyline ==
One of the first instances of the WCW Power Plant being mentioned in a wrestling storyline (known as kayfabe) was by wrestler New Jack, who cut a promo in 1995 during an Extreme Championship Wrestling event in which he claimed The Gangstas were not allowed to train at the WCW Power Plant because they were seen as dangerous by other wrestlers.

On the May 27, 1996 episode of WCW Monday Nitro, Eric Bischoff mentioned on commentary that "Hardwork" Bobby Walker was a trainee from the Power Plant. Walker beat Brad Armstrong in four minutes and twenty-six seconds.

During the October 13, 1997 episode of WCW Monday Nitro, Diamond Dallas Page cut a promo from the Power Plant.

As part of his gimmick at the time, wrestler Lodi would appear in the crowd of WCW events holding signs. On the March 2, 1998 episode of WCW Monday Nitro, Lodi can be seen with a sign that reads, "U Want 2 Wrestle? 404-351-4959". The number was for the WCW Power Plant.

On the February 5, 2000 episode of WCW WorldWide, announcer Bobby Heenan left the studio desk to go search for the Power Plant. After asking unidentified members of the production staff for help, Heenan says, "I need a lot of tight close ups of me. It's not important for me to interview or even see anyone from the Power Plant. But get all the shots of me." Heenan is ultimately unsuccessful in his search as the camera operator locks him within a chain link barricade in the studio warehouse. As he's signing off, announcer Tony Schiavone quips, "What a dummy."

=== Natural Born Thrillers ===
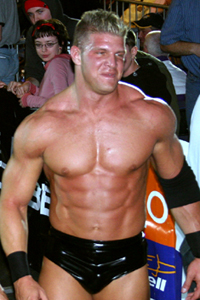
Mark Jindrak (pictured in 2005) was a member of the Natural Born Thrillers, a stable composed of WCW Power Plant graduates.

The stable Natural Born Thrillers, which was made up of Power Plant alumni, was created in 2000 and were the kayfabe enforcers of Vince Russo and Eric Bischoff. During a segment on the September 6, 2000 episode of WCW Thunder, the Natural Born Thrillers returned to the Power Plant in a limousine. They then accosted trainer Mike Graham and trainee Danny Faquir, culminating in the group beating Graham in one of the training rings. The Natural Born Thrillers then move towards their former trainer Paul Orndorff's office assaulting a trainee along the way. They make entry to the office and huddle around Orndorff, who is standing behind his desk as the group approaches. After a brief argument, Orndorff charges towards them and a melee ensues that spills out of the office where security is alerted, who break up the scuffle.

At Fall Brawl on September 17, 2000, the Natural Born Thrillers faced the Filthy Animals in an elimination tag team match. Paul Orndorff entered the match as a surprise tag partner of the Filthy Animals. While attempting to piledrive Mark Jindrak, Orndorff fell awkwardly and was immobile in the center of the ring. After conferring with referee Charles Robinson, Orndorff was pinned by Sean O'Haire. Neither team won since Robinson stopped the match on account of Orndorff legitimately suffering a neck injury. He would not wrestle another match until March 5, 2017 when he appeared at the Canadian Wrestling's Elite eighth anniversary show as a tag team partner of Omar Amir and Danny Duggan.

On the September 22, 2000 episode of WCW WorldWide, the Natural Born Thrillers (Reno, Chuck Palumbo and Mike Sanders with Sean O'Haire) defeated a team billed as Power Plant trainees (Steve Sharpe, Robbin Rage and Kevin Northcutt).

== Training style and legacy ==
To succeed at the Power Plant, a trainee was required to display an abundance of strength and stamina rather than basic wrestling skills. Trainee Craig Pittman, who previously served in the United States Marine Corps, likened the Power Plant to a military boot camp. Trainees reported to the Power Plant at 9am and began the day with a half-hour of warm-up exercises consisting of squats, push ups and sit ups. They would then get in the ring for three hours of bumps, break for lunch and return for three more hours of bumps, practice matches and test promos.

In the May 17, 1999 edition of the Wrestling Observer Newsletter, Dave Meltzer wrote, "The Power Plant, for all its hype, has been a total flop. How many stars have come out of the Power Plant? The Giant, who didn't become a star because he was taught to be a skillful performer or a good interview, and Bill Goldberg. They both had an incredible can't miss physical look and, for their respective sizes, exceptional athletic ability which overcame the fact that neither were anything close to complete packages when they were put out in front of the public. [...] Is the answer to find some young tall guys with some genetics and a little athletic ability, gas them to the gills, and push them to the moon? The Power Plant is filled with guys like that, almost all of whom are exposed as stiffs in their rare appearances on WCW Saturday Night." Meltzer put his views more bluntly in the September 30, 1999 edition, writing, "The Power Plant in its current form has clearly been a failure."

Pro Wrestling Torch columnist Bruce Mitchell was critical of the Power Plant in 1999, writing, "Dump the management of the Power Plant since it’s great at putting out muscleheads who never get over. As a publicity magnet, the Plant has been great, but for making new stars it’s been a failure. Again, check the numbers, in money and new stars, and you’ll get the point." Bryan Alvarez of Figure Four Weekly wrote in 2001 that the Power Plant was "hardly renowned for turning out world-class workers".

Wrestling manager Jim Cornette published a blog on his website in 2015, which read in part, "The Power Plant was another school notorious for their 'conditioning' drills where guys would do calisthenics until they puked and take lots of bumps, and they even had a trainer that had a 'drill sergeant' gimmick, an underneath wrestler named Dewayne Bruce [...] The Power Plant was also known for turning out very few actual star wrestlers who stood the test of time and ever worked anywhere but WCW."

WCW Power Plant founder Jody Hamilton wrote in his autobiography, Assassin: The Man Behind the Mask, "The Power Plant was one of the highlights of my career. I lived for that school." According to Hamilton, WCW management often ignored his input when it came to Power Plant trainees.

Bret Hart, who was forced to retire when a stiff kick from Power Plant graduate Bill Goldberg tore a muscle in his neck and gave him post-concussion syndrome, blamed the end of his career on the Power Plant training regime, saying "I don't think it was a priority to protect your opponent."

Kaz Hayashi, who wrestled in WCW from 1997 to 2001, has a finishing move known as the Power Plant (a modified over-the-shoulder back-to-belly piledriver), which is named after the training facility.

After WWF (now WWE) purchased certain WCW assets in 2001, the Power Plant was shuttered. Former lead trainer DeWayne Bruce opened a wrestling school known as the Super Power Plant in Jasper, Georgia, which was operated in conjunction with James Adams' Superior Wrestling promotion. Some of the WCW Power Plant trainers, including Jody Hamilton and Paul Orndorff, joined the WWA4 Pro Wrestling School staff in Atlanta following the WWF purchase. Bruce joined the training staff of WWA4 after his school closed. WWA4 is still in operation today.

In 2013, WWE opened the WWE Performance Center in Orlando, Florida, replacing its former Florida Championship Wrestling training facility.

=== Trainee experiences ===
Frustrated by the lack of bookings he was receiving as a manager in WCW, Diamond Dallas Page—who was 35 years old at the time—decided to train to become a wrestler at the Power Plant. According to Page, both Dusty Rhodes and Eric Bischoff initially advised against it, but Power Plant manager Jody Hamilton encouraged him to pursue wrestling. Page told Wade Keller of the Pro Wrestling Torch in 2011, "I lived at the Power Plant. I was constantly practicing my wrestling because they would not put me on the road. If you don't play guitar all the time, you don't get any good. If you don't get to wrestle all the time, you never get any good."

When asked about his Power Plant training, wrestler Shark Boy told Bryan Alvarez of Figure Four Radio in 2005, "It was tough [...] that was my job, nine to five Monday through Friday was to get up and go in there and get screamed at and take a lot of bumps and run around a lot [...] It was tough, though, though—but [...] I was probably [...] in the best shape of my life. You had to be just to survive there."

Bob Sapp, who is best known as a kickboxer and mixed martial artist, trained to be a wrestler at the Power Plant shortly before WCW folded. During an interview with Bryan Alvarez of Figure Four Radio, Sapp said WCW provided him with a rental car and hotel room complimentary for 90 days during his training. Sapp reflected positively on his time at the Power Plant, saying, "I'm in there with Sam Greco, Tank Abbott and other professional wrestlers [...] It was great, they were wonderful men and leaders to look up to."

Wrestler Elix Skipper claimed that Power Plant trainees were seen as threats to veteran WCW wrestlers, who feared new talent would take their airtime and eventually cause them to lose their job. On the Power Plant itself, Skipper told IYH Wrestling in 2005, "I don't know what you guys heard about a tryout, but it's three days of hell [...] The training school—it was designed to break you down. You couldn't pass the first day unless you were physically in shape and then the second two days was [sic] just mentally, because your body already broke down after the first day [...] you have to physically keep pushing yourself to make it. [...] that's Buddy Lee Parker, that's the way he pushed us and years later he explained why [the trainers] did what they did [...] to weed out the people who loved it and didn't love it and to this day I still love wrestling."

On his training experience at the Power Plant, Mark Jindrak told Neal Pruitt on the April 8, 2018 episode of the podcast Secrets of WCW Monday Nitro, "We did five hundred squats per day. We had Sarge [DeWayne Bruce]. Sarge drilled us every single day. No breaks, eight-to-four, but we were all athletes. We could handle it. We were hungry, we were all hungry. [...] So, the experience was good. I had a great time, I have memories. People want to say that we were green, we weren’t ready. Well, we were. We were green. We probably weren’t ready. I don’t feel like I really started learning how to work until I got to the system in the WWE."

Wrestler Shane Helms, who was briefly assigned to the Power Plant, claimed trainers told more senior trainees to be rough with new try-outs. Wrestler William Regal, who trained at the Power Plant in 1999, praised the school in his autobiography, Walking a Golden Mile.

==== Training of women wrestlers ====
In 2000, syndicated sports columnist John Allen reported that unnamed male WCW wrestlers were discontent with the quality of the women's training at the Power Plant and felt they were being fast tracked from the training facility to television before they were ready. An example of a woman wrestler who spent limited time at the Power Plant before appearing on a WCW broadcast was Midnight, who began her training in September 1999 and made her television debut two months later. Veteran female manager Miss Elizabeth and valet Kimberly Page were reportedly asked to train to wrestle at the WCW Power Plant, but both refused believing the storyline written by head writer of WCW television Vince Russo could irreparably damage their careers.

In 2008, Kevin Eck of The Baltimore Sun asked wrestler Daffney about her experience at the WCW Power Plant and if it was difficult training under instructor Debrah Miceli. Daffney responded, "[Miceli] was hard on us because you had girls there who really had no experience and training, like a lot of the Nitro Girls that were professional dancers. It was difficult to train with girls that didn't have much experience, and they were kind of thrown into it—poor things, it was kind of thrown at them all at once, so it was kind of shocking. [...] I don't want to call them a wuss because they went home crying, because it's tough. There have been 400-pound football players that didn't last a day. So those girls tried. But [Miceli] is a tough lady and she was really tough on us because it's a tough business."

In an interview with Dan Lovranski of Live Audio Wrestling in 2001, Molly Holly said of her training, "Dean Malenko's school focused on wrestling while the Power Plant focused on push-ups, running, sit-ups, squats, and people yelling at you."

== Management and trainers ==
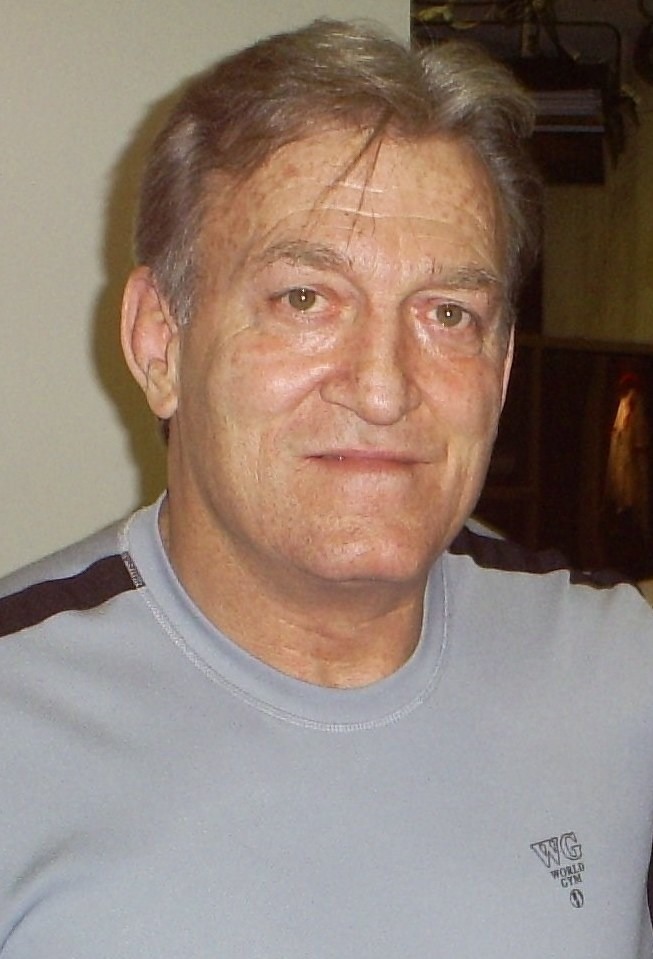
Paul Orndorff (pictured in 2009) managed the WCW Power Plant from 1998 to 2001.

- Jody Hamilton, founder, director
- Paul Orndorff, manager
- DeWayne Bruce, lead trainer
- C. W. Anderson, trainer
- Ole Anderson, trainer
- Bobby Eaton, trainer
- Mike Graham, trainer
- Nora Greenwald, trainer
- Debrah Miceli, trainer
- Mike Wenner, trainer
- Craig O’Malley, trainer
- Pat Tanaka, trainer
- Terry Taylor, trainer
- Pez Whatley, trainer

== Trainees ==
This list includes trainees of Jody Hamilton's school in the early 1990s, which was the predecessor to the WCW Power Plant.

Male trainees

- Tank Abbott
- Bryant Anderson
- C. W. Anderson
- Frank Andersson
- Johnny Attitude
- Buff Bagwell
- Luther Biggs
- Shark Boy
- Sick Boy
- Chad Brock
- Adrian Byrd
- Francisco Ciatso
- Bryan Clark
- Keith Cole
- Kent Cole
- Bob Cook
- Jason Cross
- Crowbar
- Joe Cruz
- Fred Curry III
- Scott D'Amore
- Marcial Davis
- Joey Denson
- Dan Devine
- Sean Evans
- David Flair
- Chad Fortune
- The Gambler
- Gangrel
- Shad Gaspard
- Glacier
- Goldberg
- Sam Greco
- Kevin Greene
- Mark Guthrie
- Van Hammer
- Bret Hamner
- Chris Harris
- Hardbody Harrison
- Sarkis Hazzouri
- Shane Helms
- Ulf Herman
- Horace Hogan
- Jon Hugger
- Gregory John Hunke
- Prince Iaukea
- Jet Jaguar
- Mark Jindrak
- Chris Kanyon
- Kenny Kaos
- Evan Karagias
- Kenny Kendall
- Viktor Krüger
- Lash LeRoux
- Jean-Paul Lévesque
- Lodi
- Jeremy Lopez
- Lorenzo
- The Maestro
- Karl Malone^{[a]}
- Tony Mamaluke
- Steve McMichael
- Joey Mercury
- Marc Mero
- Ernest Miller
- Chip Minton
- Shannon Moore
- Max Muscle
- Kevin Nash
- Jamie Noble
- Kevin Northcutt
- Sean O'Haire
- Diamond Dallas Page
- Chuck Palumbo
- Craig Pittman
- Dave Power
- Dean Power
- Robbie Rage
- Teddy Reade
- William Regal^{[b]}
- Luther Reigns
- Ron Reis
- The Renegade
- Reno
- Asbjørn Riis
- Dennis Rodman^{[c]}
- Kid Romeo
- Scotty Sabre
- Mike Sanders
- The Sandman
- Bob Sapp
- Big Show
- Sonny Siaki
- Elix Skipper
- Lester Speight
- Shawn Stasiak
- Jim Steele
- Ali Stevens
- Big Jake Strauss
- A.J. Styles
- Kenzo Suzuki
- Johnny Swinger
- Chase Tatum
- Kevin Tilton
- Mike Tolbert
- Dale Torborg
- Ice Train
- Jerry Tuite
- Bobby Walker
- Erik Watts
- Kwee Wee
- Curtis White
- Reggie White
- Josh Wilcox
- Alex Wright
- Jimmy Yang
- Christian York

Female trainees

- Asya
- Daffney
- Lenita Erickson
- Major Gunns
- Gorgeous George
- Molly Holly
- Stacy Keibler
- Carmel Macklin
- Fyre
- Marie
- Debra Marshall
- Leia Meow
- Midajah
- Midnight
- Shakira
- Sharmell
- Spice
- Tori
- Tygress
- Torrie Wilson

Footnotes
^{a} Karl Malone trained at the WCW Power Plant for three days in June 1998 for his match at Bash at the Beach.
^{b} Regal was already a hugely experienced star internationally before coming to WCW and the Power Plant including televised matches in his native United Kingdom, tournament matches in Germany and experience elsewhere including Israel and Egypt.
^{c} According to Dave Meltzer of the Wrestling Observer Newsletter, Rodman trained for "a few weeks" at the WCW Power Plant for his match at Bash at the Beach on July 13, 1997.

== See also ==
- WWE Performance Center
- Hart Dungeon
