= Chip Minton =

American bobsledder and wrestler (born 1969)

Nathan Chip Minton III (born June 9, 1969) is an American former bobsledder and former professional wrestler for World Championship Wrestling. He is best known for his participation in the Winter Olympics in 1994 and 1998, where he represented the United States' bobsleigh team.

== Early life ==
After graduating from high school, Minton began working as a prison guard near his hometown of Macon in Georgia. During his time as a prison guard, he also worked as a bodybuilder before he began training for a career in bobsleigh after becoming interested in the sport due to seeing Herschel Walker's performance in the 1992 Winter Olympics. In addition to his bobsleigh training, Minton also began training at World Championship Wrestling's Power Plant wrestling school for a career in professional wrestling.

== Career ==
=== Bobsleigh ===
Chip Minton
Medal record

Bobsleigh

World Championships
Bronze medal – third place	1997 St. Moritz	Four-man

While still working as a prison guard, Minton was invited to an Olympic bobsleigh training camp in 1993 in Calgary, Alberta, Canada, during which time he crashed twice. After completing his training, Minton participated in the 1994 Winter Olympics, where he and Jim Herberich finished fourteenth overall in the two-man event. Following the Olympics, Minton quit his job as a prison guard in order to fully concentrate on his careers as a bobsledder and professional wrestler. At the 1997 FIBT World Championships in St. Moritz, Minton was successful in winning the bronze medal in the four-man event alongside Brian Shimer, Randy Jones, and Robert Olesen. Following his unsuccessful run in the previous Winter Olympics, Minton gained the best finish of his Olympic career as he, Shimer, Jones and Garreth Hines finished in fifth overall in the four-man event at the 1998 Winter Olympics.

=== Professional wrestling ===
Chip Minton
Personal information
- Born: Nathan Minton III; June 9, 1969 (age 57) Macon, Georgia

Professional wrestling career
- Ring name(s): Mr. World Class; Chip Minton
- Billed height: 6 ft 1 in (1.85 m)
- Billed weight: 246 lb (112 kg)
- Billed from: Macon, Georgia
- Trained by: WCW Power Plant
- Debut: January 1, 1994
- Retired: July 9, 1999

Prior to his appearance at the 1994 Winter Olympics, Minton began training as a wrestler on January 1, 1994. Although he had yet to make his in-ring debut, his training enabled him to support his family. On June 10, 1995, Minton made his in-ring debut under the ring name Mr. World Class, where he teamed with Gorgeous George III, Maxx Muscle, and The Gambler to defeat David Haskins, King Cobra, Scott Studd, and Super Mario in an eight-man tag team match for the United States Wrestling Association. Following this, he took a year-long hiatus before returning to make his World Championship Wrestling debut as Chip Minton on the July 10, 1996 episode of WorldWide, where he lost to Big Bubba. Minton then took another hiatus from wrestling in order to focus on the 1997 FIBT World Championships before returning on the October 20, 1998 episode of Saturday Night, where he defeated Lenny Lane. On November 22, Minton made his pay-per-view debut at World War 3, where he competed in the eponymous battle royal for a match for the World Heavyweight Championship, but was unsuccessful as Kevin Nash ultimately won the match. Beginning in 1999, Minton continued wrestling sporadically on WCW's lower shows Saturday Night and WorldWide as well as on house shows before wrestling his final match on July 9, 1999, where he and Kenny Kaos wrestled to a draw at a house show.

=== Ministry ===
After retiring from wrestling, Minton joined Team Impact, a Christian athlete ministry, in September 2007 and continues to perform as a part of its roster.
