= The Great American Bash (1997) =

World Championship Wrestling pay-per-view event

- Promotional poster
- Promotion: World Championship Wrestling
- Date: June 15, 1997
- City: Moline, Illinois
- Venue: The MARK of the Quad Cities
- Attendance: 9,613
- Buy rate: 220,000
- Tagline: Give Him A Nice Warm Hug On Father's Day

Pay-per-view chronology
← Previous; Slamboree	Next → Bash at the Beach

The Great American Bash chronology
← Previous; 1996	Next → 1998

The 1997 Great American Bash was the seventh Great American Bash professional wrestling pay-per-view event produced by World Championship Wrestling (WCW), and 11th Great American Bash event overall. It took place on June 15, 1997, at The MARK of the Quad Cities in Moline, Illinois.

Nine matches were contested at the event. In the main event, Randy Savage defeated Diamond Dallas Page in a Falls Count Anywhere match. In other prominent matches, The Outsiders (Kevin Nash and Scott Hall) defeated Ric Flair and Roddy Piper to retain the WCW World Tag Team Championship, Kevin Greene defeated Steve McMichael, Chris Benoit defeated Meng in a Death match, and Akira Hokuto successfully retained her WCW Women's Championship in a Title vs. Career match against Madusa, who was forced to retire from professional wrestling.

== Production ==
=== Background ===
The Great American Bash is a professional wrestling event established in 1985. It was first produced by the National Wrestling Alliance's (NWA) Jim Crockett Promotions (JCP) and aired on closed-circuit television before becoming a pay-per-view event in 1988; JCP was rebranded as World Championship Wrestling (WCW) later that same year. WCW then seceded from the NWA in 1991. The 1997 event was the seventh Great American Bash event promoted by WCW and 11th overall. It took place on June 15, 1997, at The MARK of the Quad Cities in Moline, Illinois.

=== Storylines ===
The event featured professional wrestling matches that involve different wrestlers from pre-existing scripted feuds and storylines. Professional wrestlers portray villains, heroes, or less distinguishable characters in the scripted events that build tension and culminate in a wrestling match or series of matches.

== Event ==
Other on-screen personnel
Role:	Name:
Commentators	Tony Schiavone
Commentators	Bobby Heenan
Commentators	Dusty Rhodes
Interviewer	Gene Okerlund
Ring announcers	David Penzer
Ring announcers	Michael Buffer
Referee	Randy Anderson
Referee	Mark Curtis
Referee	Scott Dickinson
Referee	Mickie Jay
Referee	Nick Patrick

The opening match of the pay-per-view saw Ultimate Dragon defeat Psychosis. Sonny Onoo who came out with Psychosis accidentally kicked him in the head, which enabled Dragon to apply the Dragon Sleeper and pick up victory via submission.

The second match saw Harlem Heat (Booker T and Stevie Ray) take on The Steiner Brothers (Rick Steiner and Scott Steiner), with the winner becoming the number one contender for the WCW World Tag Team Championship. After Scott hit a Frankensteiner off the top rope on Booker T, Vincent came out and dropped an elbow onto Booker T. This caused the Steiners to be disqualified and enabled Harlem Heat to become #1 contenders.

The next match saw Konnan defeat Hugh Morrus. As Morrus went for the moonsault off the top, he hit his face on the top turnbuckle. This gave Konnan the opening to hit the Tequila Sunrise and pick up the victory.

During the following match, Glacier took on Wrath. During the match, Mortis was handcuffed outside the ring, however toward the end of the match threw a chain into the ring for Wrath. Glacier however got the chain, hit Wrath with it and followed it up with a superkick to pick up the win. Following the match, after Mortis' handcuffs were removed, he used them to handcuff Glacier to the rope, as the two double teamed Glacier.

In a Title vs. Career match, Akira Hokuto put her WCW Women's Championship, against Madusa’s career. After Madusa hurt her knee during the match, Akira hit a brainbuster to pick up the victory, and forcing Madusa to retire. After the match, Gene Okerlund attempted to talk with Madusa and the trainer evaluating her knee, however neither was willing to talk with him.

The next match was fought under hardcore rules, referred to as a death match. During the match, Chris Benoit picked up the submission victory over Meng, who submitted to the Crippler Crossface. After the match, both wrestlers were put on a stretcher back stage.

Kevin Greene next defeated Steve McMichael after Jeff Jarrett came out to interfere, however he accidentally hit the wrong man with a steel briefcase. This match was followed by the WCW World Tag Team Championship match, which saw The Outsiders (Scott Hall and Kevin Nash) retain the titles against Ric Flair and Roddy Piper, and Hall hit the Outsiders Edger on Piper.

The final match was a Falls Count Anywhere match between Randy Savage and Diamond Dallas Page. Scott Hall came out and hit the Outsider’s Edge on Page, followed by Savage hitting the flying elbowdrop, to pick up the win.

== Results ==
No.	Results	Stipulations	Times
1	Ultimate Dragon defeated Psychosis (with Sonny Onoo) by submission	Singles match	14:20
2	Harlem Heat (Booker T and Stevie Ray) (with Sister Sherri) defeated The Steiner Brothers (Rick Steiner and Scott Steiner) by disqualification	Tag team match	12:02
3	Konnan defeated Hugh Morrus by submission	Singles match	10:34
4	Glacier defeated Wrath (with James Vandenberg and Mortis)	Singles match	12:02
5	Akira Hokuto (c) (with Sonny Onoo) defeated Madusa	Title vs. Career match for the WCW Women's Championship	11:41
6	Chris Benoit defeated Meng by submission	Death match	14:59
7	Kevin Greene defeated Steve McMichael (with Debra McMichael)	Singles match	09:21
8	The Outsiders (Kevin Nash and Scott Hall) (c) (with Syxx) defeated Ric Flair and Roddy Piper	Tag team match for the WCW World Tag Team Championship	10:02
9	Randy Savage (with Miss Elizabeth) defeated Diamond Dallas Page (with Kimberly Page)	Falls Count Anywhere match	16:56
(c) / – the champion(s) heading into the match
