= The Gambler (wrestler) =

American retired professional wrestler

Personal information
- Born: Jeffrey Gann c. 1963 Chattanooga, Tennessee

Professional wrestling career
- Ring name(s): The Gambler; Jeff Gamble
- Billed weight: 231 lb (105 kg)
- Billed from: Biloxi, Mississippi
- Trained by: WCW Power Plant
- Debut: October 30, 1990
- Retired: August 31, 1999

Jeffrey Gann (born c. 1963) is an American retired professional wrestler, best known for his time with World Championship Wrestling (WCW), under the ring name The Gambler. He appeared with the company as a jobber to the stars between 1990 and 1999. He initially competed as Jeff Gamble during the early years of his career before developing his Gambler character. He also briefly competed in the United States Wrestling Association, where he was a one-time World Tag Team Champion with Brickhouse Brown.

== Professional wrestling career ==
=== World Championship Wrestling (1990-1995) ===
==== Jeff Gamble (1990–1991) ====
Gann started his professional wrestling career in 1990 by signing a contract with World Championship Wrestling (WCW). He was trained at the WCW Power Plant and made his debut on WCW television as an enhancement talent on the November 17 episode of World Championship Wrestling, where he lost to The Big Cat under the ring name Jeff Gamble. The following week, on the November 24 episode of World Championship Wrestling, Gamble and Scott Sandlin lost to Big Cat and The Motor City Madman. His next appearance was on the January 13, 1991 episode of Main Event, where he lost to Bobby Eaton.

==== The Gambler (1992–1995) ====
Gann developed his character of The Gambler in United States Wrestling Association (USWA), where he teamed with Psycho in a loss to The Power Twins on May 30, 1992. Gamble assisted in carrying the Fabulous Moolah's caravan to the ring at Slamboree '93 on May 23, 1993, and later was one of Rick Rude's two "belt guards" that guarded the vacated US Title inside a briefcase. He returned to WCW action at a live event on September 21, 1993 under the Gambler character, where he lost to Jim Steele. His televised return was on the October 23 episode of Saturday Night, where he teamed with Fred Avery and Todd Zane against The Shockmaster, Ice Train and Charlie Norris. His first televised appearance as Gambler was in a tag team match with Big Bad John against Thunder and Lightning on the November 28 episode of Main Event. He would make a unique entrance by taking out a set of playing cards from his jacket and showing them to the audience as part of his character. He was a regular jobber to the stars against major stars including Sting, Ricky Steamboat, Dustin Rhodes, Erik Watts, Johnny B. Badd, Brian Pillman, Arn Anderson, The Patriot, Marcus Alexander Bagwell and 2 Cold Scorpio.

Gambler gained his first win in WCW on the September 10 episode of Pro against Scott Studd. He received his only title shot in WCW on the October 22, 1994 episode of Saturday Night against Jim Duggan for the United States Heavyweight Championship and lost in a short match.

=== United States Wrestling Association (1995) ===
As part of WCW's working relationship with Memphis-based USWA, Gann toured with USWA in 1995, returning to the company after three years. Gambler formed a tag team with Brickhouse Brown upon debuting in USWA and the duo were booked to win the promotion's World Tag Team Championship by beating PG-13 on April 15. They made a successful title defense against PG-13 on April 24 before dropping the title back to PG-13 on May 1. After failing to regain the titles on May 8, Gann formed a new tag team with Gorgeous George III to regain the title from PG-13. Gambler and George received a title shot at World Tag Team Championship against PG-13 on June 5, but were defeated. At Memphis Memories II, Gambler, George, Mr. World Class and Maxx Muscle defeated Scott Studd, Davey Haskins, Super Mario and King Cobra. On July 3, Gambler lost a match to his former tag team partner Brickhouse Brown. Gambler closed his run in USWA with a loss to Steven Dunn on September 4, 1995.

=== Return to WCW (1995–1999) ===
After a stint with USWA, Gann returned to WCW television on the December 2, 1995 episode of Saturday Night against Mr. JL. After the launch of Monday Nitro, Gann became a regular jobber on WCW's B-shows such as Saturday Night, WorldWide, Pro and Main Event. Gann put over many rising and established stars during his career and also served as the first opponent of Prince Iaukea on the June 1, 1996 episode of Saturday Night and Glacier on the September 8 episode of Pro. Chris Jericho, another young WCW wrestler, recalled a bout against Gann:

[He was a] journeyman wrestler that I'd never seen before (or since). His gimmick was he was a Kenny Rogers impersonator. Even though that gimmick would rule, his actual gimmick was of a Maverick-style riverboat gambler. It was a horrible feeling knowing that my future was in the hands of a man who did card tricks on his way to the ring. I didn't know if he was good or if he sucked, but my self-esteem was at such a low that I was going to leave the match up to him. I was gambling on the Gambler.

Having confidence is a huge part of being successful. When you have it, you can do no wrong. When you don't, all you can do is wrong. At that point all of my previous accomplishments didn't mean a damn thing. This was my last chance.

The Gambler led the match and I followed him. He was a meat-and-potatoes wrestler so it was nothing fancy, but it was exactly what I needed. It was the type of basic match that I would've had in wrestling camp. No bells or whistles, just a good story and solid execution. Lo and behold, we had a good little match and within five minutes I had regained my confidence and once again became Chris Jericho - World Beater.

After a few matches in early 1997, Gambler took a hiatus and returned to television on the July 18, 1998 episode of Saturday Night, where he suffered a loss against Norman Smiley. He picked up a victory against David Taylor on the April 27, 1999 episode of WorldWide. Gambler's final match was on the August 21 episode of WorldWide, a loss to Johnny Attitude. He was released from his WCW contract on August 31, 1999.

== Personal life ==
It was falsely reported that Gann died on June 7, 2023. It was mentioned by wrestler Sue Green. The next day it was revealed that Gann had not died and that it was independent Florida wrestler, Rusty Stallings who wrestled as The Gambler that died. Gann's son would later confirm on Twitter that his father is alive and that he spoke with him.

== Championships and accomplishments ==
- Mid-Missouri Wrestling Association
  - MMWA Heavyweight Championship (1 time)
  - MMWA Tag Team Championship (1 time) – with Frankie D
- United States Wrestling Association
  - USWA World Tag Team Championship (1 time) – with Brickhouse Brown
