= NWA Mountain State Heavyweight Championship =

American professional wrestling championship

The NWA Mountain State Heavyweight Championship is a professional wrestling championship that serves as a championship for the National Wrestling Alliance, under the promotion Mountain State Wrestling.

== Title history ==
#	Wrestler	Reign	Date	Days held	Location	Notes	Ref.
1	Scotty McKeever	1	August 2005	(Note: The exact date on which the title was won is not known, which means the title reign lasted between 30 and 59 days.)	(Note: The exact place which the title was won in is not known.)	Won sometime before September 1, 2005.	
2	Kid Apollo	1	September 29, 2005	65	Mount Hope, WV		
	Vacated		December 3, 2005	—		Title was vacated after Kid Apollo no-showed.	
3	Danny Ray	1	December 3, 2005	217	Mullens, WV	Wins a battle royal; renamed NWA Mountain State Title on March 2, 2005 when MSW becomes an associate of the NWA Tri-state promotion.	
4	War Machine	1	July 8, 2006	523	Mullens, WV		
5	Frank Parker	1	January 13, 2007	329	Mount Hope, WV		
6	The Stro	1	December 8, 2007	245	Hinton, WV		
7	Jason Kincaid	1	August 9, 2008	206	Beaver, WV		
8	The Stro	2	March 3, 2009	190	Princeton, WV	This title change is not recognised by the National Wrestling Alliance.	
9	Derek Billings	1	September 9, 2009	2	Falls View, WV	This title change is not recognised by the National Wrestling Alliance.	
10	The Stro	3	September 11, 2009	190	Mullens, WV	This title change is not recognised by the National Wrestling Alliance. Defeats "King" Richard Shane and Derek Billings in a three-way match.	
11	"King" Richard Shane	1	March 20, 2010	112	Rand WV		
12	The Stro	4	July 7, 2010	273	Hinton, WV	Defeats Derik Billings who subbed for Richard who was unable to compete in the defense due to vehicle problems.	
13	Karl	1	April 9, 2011		Hinton, WV		
14	Johnny Blast	1	August 20, 2011		Hinton, WV		

== See also ==
- List of National Wrestling Alliance championships
