= Midnight (wrestler) =

American bodybuilder and professional wrestler

Personal information
- Born: Ann-Marie Crooks; September 12, 1965 (age 61) Kingston, Jamaica

Professional wrestling career
- Ring name: Midnight
- Billed height: 5 ft 10 in (178 cm)
- Billed weight: 195 lb (88 kg)
- Billed from: Harlem, New York
- Trained by: WCW Power Plant
- Debut: November 8, 1999
- Retired: 2001

Ann-Marie Crooks (born September 12, 1965) is a Jamaican-born American former female bodybuilder and professional wrestler. She fought for World Championship Wrestling (WCW) in 1999 under the ring name Midnight.

== Bodybuilding ==
Before getting into bodybuilding, Crooks had considered a career in aeronautical engineering but chose to go into the Air Force, where she spent two years in Germany.

She won the Ms. Sunshine State bodybuilding competition in 1992 and placed well in other bodybuilding events through 1998, finishing 2nd place in the 1994 National Physique Committee (NPC) Nationals (heavyweights).

== Professional wrestling ==
In 1999, she began a short wrestling career with World Championship Wrestling (WCW) under the name Midnight. She acted as the valet and storyline sibling of Harlem Heat's Booker T and Stevie Ray. She trained at the WCW Power Plant. During her time with WCW, she made appearances at Mayhem and Starrcade in 1999, and Souled Out in 2000. Also, she fought in intergender matches. She feuded with Stevie Ray.

== Personal life ==
She is a licensed realtor. She is married and resides in Florida.

== Contest history (bodybuilding) ==
- 1992 Ms. Sunshine State - 1st
- 1993 Ms. Florida - 1st
- 1993 NPC Nationals - 4th (HW)
- 1993 IFBB North American Championship - 2nd (HW)
- 1994 NPC Nationals - 2nd (HW)
- 1996 NPC Nationals - 3rd (HW)
- 1998 NPC USA Championship - 4th (HW)
- 1998 NPC Nationals - 8th (HW)
