= Bobby Walker (wrestler) =

American professional wrestler

Personal information
- Born: Fayetteville, North Carolina, U.S.
- Family: Thunderbolt Patterson (uncle)

Professional wrestling career
- Ring name(s): Bobby Walker; Hurricane Walker; Robbie Walker
- Billed height: 5 ft 11 in (180 cm)
- Billed weight: 238 lb (108 kg)
- Billed from: Atlanta, Georgia
- Trained by: WCW Power Plant
- Debut: 1989
- Retired: February 2000

Bobby Walker is an American former professional wrestler who is best known for his appearances in World Championship Wrestling (WCW) from 1992 until 2000.

== Professional wrestling career ==
=== Early career (1989–1992) ===
Walker made his professional debut in 1989. Wrestling as Hurricane Walker in 1990, he challenged for the NWA Florida Tag Team Championship; teaming with Brian Knobbs, he competed for the vacant title against Robert Fuller and Kendall Windham but was unable to win the title. When it was vacated again, he paired with Joe Gomez in another unsuccessful attempt to win the championship. He and Tim Parker won the championship belts in late 1990 by defeating Sgt. Rock and Mark Starr but soon dropped the title to Sgt. Rock and Ron Slinker.

Walker made brief appearances with Frontier Martial-Arts Wrestling in July 1991, the World Wrestling Federation (WWF) in November 1991, and the International Championship Wrestling Alliance in 1992. In 1991, he was rated number 354 in Pro Wrestling Illustrated's annual ranking of the top 500 wrestlers in the world; the following year, he was ranked at number 365. He later trained at the WCW Power Plant, a training facility operated by WCW.

=== World Championship Wrestling (1992–2000) ===
Walker made his World Championship Wrestling debut in 1992 under the name Robbie Walker. Originally he was scheduled to team with Ron Simmons at the Clash of the Champions XXI against Cactus Jack, Tony Atlas, and The Barbarian in a handicap match, but was injured and was replaced by the debuting 2 Cold Scorpio. After nearly a year recovering and working house shows for WCW, he returned under the name Bobby Walker and appeared in a televised match as part of a tag team with Jason Johnson in a loss to Harlem Heat on the January 8, 1994, episode of WCW Saturday Night.

Starting in 1995, he was known as "'Hardwork' Bobby Walker", and he was managed by Teddy Long. Walker competed as a jobber to the stars on WCW's lower-tier programming while winning occasional bouts against enhancement talent. He wrestled his only pay-per-view match at World War 3 in 1995 as one of sixty men in a three-ring battle royal that was won by Randy Savage.

Walker was chosen to team with The Barbarian at Slamboree 1996 for the Lethal Lottery, but was injured by Lex Luger on a WCW Saturday Night, Walker was replaced by Diamond Dallas Page, who would eventually win the battle royal. He defeated Billy Kidman in a dark match at Bash at the Beach. In August, Walker teamed with Mr. J.L. in a dark match at Clash of the Champions XXXIII in which they were defeated by The Nasty Boys. Walker remained with the company until his release in February 2000.

== Personal life ==
Walker is the nephew of former professional wrestler Thunderbolt Patterson.

In 2000, Walker, Sonny Onoo, Hardbody Harrison, and several other performers filed a lawsuit against WCW, alleging racial discrimination. Walker stated that his Caucasian opponents were told to make him look bad and that he was told that he would never hold a championship belt. He also stated that he was paid less than many of the company's Caucasian wrestlers. The suit also stated that African-American wrestlers were made to look "loud, obnoxious, pompous and shiftless". On April 3, 2001, a judge ruled that WCW had not committed fraud or breached the contracts of the plaintiffs, and that the discrimination lawsuit could proceed. Because the World Wrestling Federation (WWF), now World Wrestling Entertainment, had purchased WCW after the lawsuit was filed, Walker's lawyer stated that the plaintiffs would pursue legal action against the WWF. The lawsuit was eventually settled out of court.

== Championships and accomplishments ==
- Championship Wrestling from Florida
  - PWF Tag Team Championship (1 time) - with Tim Parker
- Pro Wrestling Illustrated
  - PWI ranked Bobby Walker # 354 of the 500 best singles wrestlers of the PWI 500 in 1991
