= Hardbody Harrison =

American army veteran and professional wrestler

- Born: Harrison Norris Jr. August 22, 1966 (age 60); Pensacola, Florida, U.S.
- Occupation: Professional wrestler
- Criminal information
- Status: Incarcerated
- Convictions: Peonage, Forced Labor, Human Trafficking, Sex Trafficking, Witness Tampering, Criminal Conspiracy, Obstruction of Justice
- Penalty: Life imprisonment
- Professional wrestling career
- Ring name(s): Hardbody Harrison; Hardbody Harris; The Colorado Crusader; The Georgia Blond
- Billed height: 5 ft 10 in (1.78 m)
- Billed weight: 185 lb (84 kg)
- Trained by: WCW Power Plant
- Debut: 1995
- Retired: 2001
- Military career
- Allegiance: United States
- Branch: United States Army
- Rank: Sergeant
- Conflicts: Gulf War

Harrison Norris Jr. (born August 22, 1966) is an American former professional wrestler, amateur boxer, and soldier. He appeared with World Championship Wrestling (WCW) under the ring names Hardbody Harrison and sometimes Hardbody Harris. In 2008, he was sentenced to life in prison for his part in a sex trafficking and forced labor ring.

== Early life ==
Harrison graduated from high school in Pensacola, Florida, after which he enlisted in the United States Army and saw action in Operation Desert Shield and Operation Desert Storm. He served as a platoon and motor sergeant, and received an honorable discharge in 1995.

== Professional wrestling ==
He then trained at the WCW Power Plant and later in 1995, debuted in World Championship Wrestling as a jobber. He appeared on WCW Monday Nitro as well as 1997's Starrcade. In 2000, he was a party to a multi-plaintiff lawsuit filed by Sonny Onoo, Bobby Walker and several other former WCW talents against former parent company AOL Time Warner alleging racial discrimination; the suit was settled out of court for which Harrison received a sizeable payout.

In 1997, he made a couple of appearances for United States Wrestling Association in Tennessee.

In 2000, Harrison also appeared in Toughman competitions which broadcast from 1999 to 2001 on FX show Toughman. In 2000, he was the show's heavyweight champion.

In March 2001, WCW was bought by the World Wrestling Federation and Harrison's contract was not retained.

== Criminal charges ==
On August 18, 2004, Harrison was arrested by the Smyrna Police Department in Smyrna, Georgia on three counts of false imprisonment and after spending one night in jail, he was released on a $55,000 bond the next day.

On August 23, 2005, FBI agents served a search warrant and raided Harrison's two homes in Bartow County, Georgia. On October 18, 2005, he was arrested by the FBI on a nine count federal indictment for false imprisonment and trafficking women for commercial sex acts. On November 22, 2007, he was found guilty and convicted by a federal jury in Atlanta, Georgia on 24 counts related to keeping eight women as sex slaves. Charges included conspiracy to commit an offense against the United States, trafficking with respect to peonage and forced labor, sex trafficking, witness tampering, and obstructing an investigation.

During proceedings, for which he served as his own attorney, Harrison contended the women lived in his homes with his wife and child because they wanted to train as professional wrestlers, and that he had helped them quit drugs. Witnesses contended that Harrison manipulated the women psychologically, forced them to have sex with him, and required them to participate in large sex orgies involving up to eight men at a time. The victims contended that Harrison's rigid training regimen and having to memorize a series of "commandments" was designed to make them attractive prostitutes, and that he pimped them out to locations in North Carolina and northern Georgia until a few of the women went to the police.

Following his conviction, Harrison was sentenced to life in prison on April 1, 2008.
