= Bryant Anderson =

American wrestler (born 1970)

Personal information
- Born: Bryant Alan Rogowski; November 6, 1970 (age 55) Minneapolis, Minnesota, U.S.
- Education: University of Tennessee at Chattanooga; Georgia State University (JD)
- Spouse: Mandy
- Children: 2
- Family: Ole Anderson (father)

Professional wrestling career
- Ring name: Bryant Anderson
- Billed height: 6 ft 1 in (185 cm)
- Billed weight: 240 lb (109 kg)
- Trained by: Ole Anderson; Jody Hamilton
- Debut: 1993
- Retired: 1995

Bryant Alan Rogowski (born November 6, 1970) is an American attorney and former professional wrestler, better known by his ring name, Bryant Anderson. He is the son of professional wrestler Ole Anderson. Anderson wrestled for World Championship Wrestling (WCW) in 1993, as well as wrestling for various independent promotions in the southeastern United States during the mid-1990s.

== Early life ==
Born in Minneapolis, Minnesota, Rogowski was on the Etowah High School wrestling team and had a successful amateur career, winning a Georgia state championship in his senior year at 171 pounds. Before graduating, he accepted a wrestling scholarship from the University of Tennessee at Chattanooga and finished third in the Southern Conference in the heavyweight division as a junior. In 2016, Rogowski was inducted to the Cherokee County Sports Hall of Fame.

== Professional wrestling career ==
=== World Championship Wrestling (1993–1994) ===
Rogowski's father Ole Anderson often took time from his wrestling schedule to attend his matches; this was the storyline reason for Ole Anderson's dismissal from The Four Horsemen in 1987. Ole had missed some shows to watch his son wrestle, and Tully Blanchard called Bryant a "snot nosed kid". Ole attacked Blanchard, and was kicked out and eventually replaced by Lex Luger.

During the early 1990s, Rogowski was trained at the WCW Power Plant by his father and Jody Hamilton before making his debut on WCW television as a heel in 1993 under the ring name "Bryant Anderson", having a similar build, general look and submission-based wrestling style resembling Ole and Gene Anderson. However, WCW did not have plans for him: other than teaming occasionally with Diamond Dallas Page, he mostly wrestled as a preliminary wrestler during his last months with the promotion eventually being released by new WCW head Eric Bischoff in mid-1994.

=== World Wrestling Network (1994) ===
In mid-1994, Anderson briefly competed in Jim Crockett Jr.'s World Wrestling Network promotion, where he teamed with Tully Blanchard.

=== Smoky Mountain Wrestling (1994–1995) ===
In October 1994, Anderson debuted in Smoky Mountain Wrestling, where promoter Jim Cornette used him as a mid-card heel; his father briefly managed him but left after a few appearances.

After fighting to a draw with Tracy Smothers on October 1, he became a main rival of Smothers following his winning the SMW "Beat the Champ" Television title from Scott Studd in Morganton, North Carolina two days later. Fighting to a series of draws with Smothers in early October, he finally lost to Smothers in an 8-man tag team match with Boo Bradley, Chris Candido and Bruiser Bedlam against Smothers, "Dirty White Boy" Tony Anthony, Brian Lee and Lance Storm in Evarts, Kentucky on November 4, 1994.

Losing to Smothers in Morristown, Tennessee the following night, the two would again fight to a time limit draw and later that night participated in another 8-Man tag team match with Boo Bradley, Chris Candido and Bruiser Bedlam again losing to Smothers, Tony Anthony, Brian Lee and Lance Storm in Hyden, Kentucky on November 6, 1994.

Successfully defending his title against James Adkins, George South and The Nightmare, he was forced to vacate the championship belt on November 7 after a five-week reign. Anderson continued to face Smothers in indecisive draws before losing to him on November 10 and, in a "no time limit" match on November 12. However, Anderson soon avenged his loss defeating Smothers four times at the 4-day Thanksgiving Thunder supercard on November 24–27, 1994.

He eventually lost to Smothers three times in "I Quit" matches during the 3-day Christmas Chaos supercard from December 25–27 and continued to lose to him in rematches later that month.

Continuing his feud with Smothers into early 1995, he also participated in a 16-man battle royal on January 2 and scored victories over Mike Furnus, Ted Allen, Tommy Pitner and The Nightmare. He later faced Smothers in late January, losing to him in a singles match on January 20 and in two "I Quit" matches on January 21 and January 27, before leaving the promotion shortly before its close in November 1995 and retired shortly thereafter.

== Legal career ==
Rogowski attended Georgia State University law school and graduated with a Juris Doctor degree. He went on to work in family and children services. As of 2016, he served as the director of children services for Franklin County and Hart County in northeast Georgia.

== Championships and accomplishments ==
- Cherokee County Sports Hall of Fame
  - Class of 2016
- Pro Wrestling Illustrated
  - PWI ranked him #295 of the 500 best singles wrestlers of the PWI 500 in 1994
- Smoky Mountain Wrestling
  - SMW Beat the Champ Television Championship (1 time)
