= Sick Boy (wrestler) =

American professional wrestler (born 1973)

Personal information
- Born: Robert Scott Vick; March 20, 1973 (age 53) Charlotte, North Carolina, US

Professional wrestling career
- Ring name(s): Lance Ringo; Scott Vick; Sick Boy
- Billed height: 6 ft 4 in (193 cm)
- Billed weight: 250 lb (110 kg)
- Trained by: WCW Power Plant
- Debut: September 25, 1996
- Retired: 2021

Robert Scott Vick (born March 20, 1973) is an American professional wrestler. He is best known for his appearances with World Championship Wrestling from 1997 to 1999 under the ring name Sick Boy, where he was a member of Raven's Flock.

== Professional wrestling career ==
=== World Championship Wrestling (1996–1999) ===
After training at the WCW Power Plant, he made his professional wrestling on September 25, 1996 when he defeated Luther Biggs in a dark match. He made his television debut on the March 31, 1997 episode of Nitro under the ring name Lance Ringo, where he lost to Diamond Dallas Page.

Several months later, Vick competed on the November 24 episode of Nitro as Sick Boy, where he was also revealed to be a member of Raven's Flock. His third match of his career was a loss to Chris Benoit. Sick Boy received his first title match as he competed against Page for the United States Heavyweight Championship on the January 29, 1998 episode of Thunder, but was unsuccessful in winning the title. He faced Page in a rematch for the title on the February 17 episode of Saturday Night, but was again unsuccessful. He then continued to wrestle in many feuds with Chris Benoit, Diamond Dallas Page, Steve McMichael, Bill Goldberg and others.

Sick Boy would then be used as a jobber for several months afterwards, and remained with the Flock until its disbanding on September 13 at Fall Brawl. In 1999, Vick dropped the grungy attire associated with the Flock and adopted wrestling trunks in addition to dyeing his hair blond. On the July 22 episode of Thunder, he wrestled his last match for the company as he faced Rick Steiner in a match for the World Television Championship, but was unsuccessful in winning the title.

=== World Wrestling Federation / Memphis (1999–2002) ===
In October 1999, Vick signed a contract with the World Wrestling Federation. He was sent to developmental territories in Memphis, Power Pro Wrestling and Memphis Championship Wrestling and appeared on over fifty WWE shows in dark matches or on house shows between 2000-2002. He was going to originally be part of the infamous Katie Vick angle, as Katie's brother, but plans never materialized. After creative could find nothing for Vick, he was released in 2002.

=== Independent circuit (2012–2015, 2021) ===
On November 2, 2014, Sick Boy and Lodi reunited to win the WrestleForce Tag Team Championship from The Bravado Brothers. The Flock lost the titles against The Bravado Brothers on February 8, 2015.

Sick Boy returned for a match one night with Lodi on June 19, 2021 as they defeated CW Anderson and Preston Quinn at Ring Wars Carolina.

== Championships and accomplishments ==
- WrestleForce
  - WrestleForce Tag Team Championship (1 time) - with Lodi
