= Lodi (wrestler) =

American professional wrestler (born 1970)

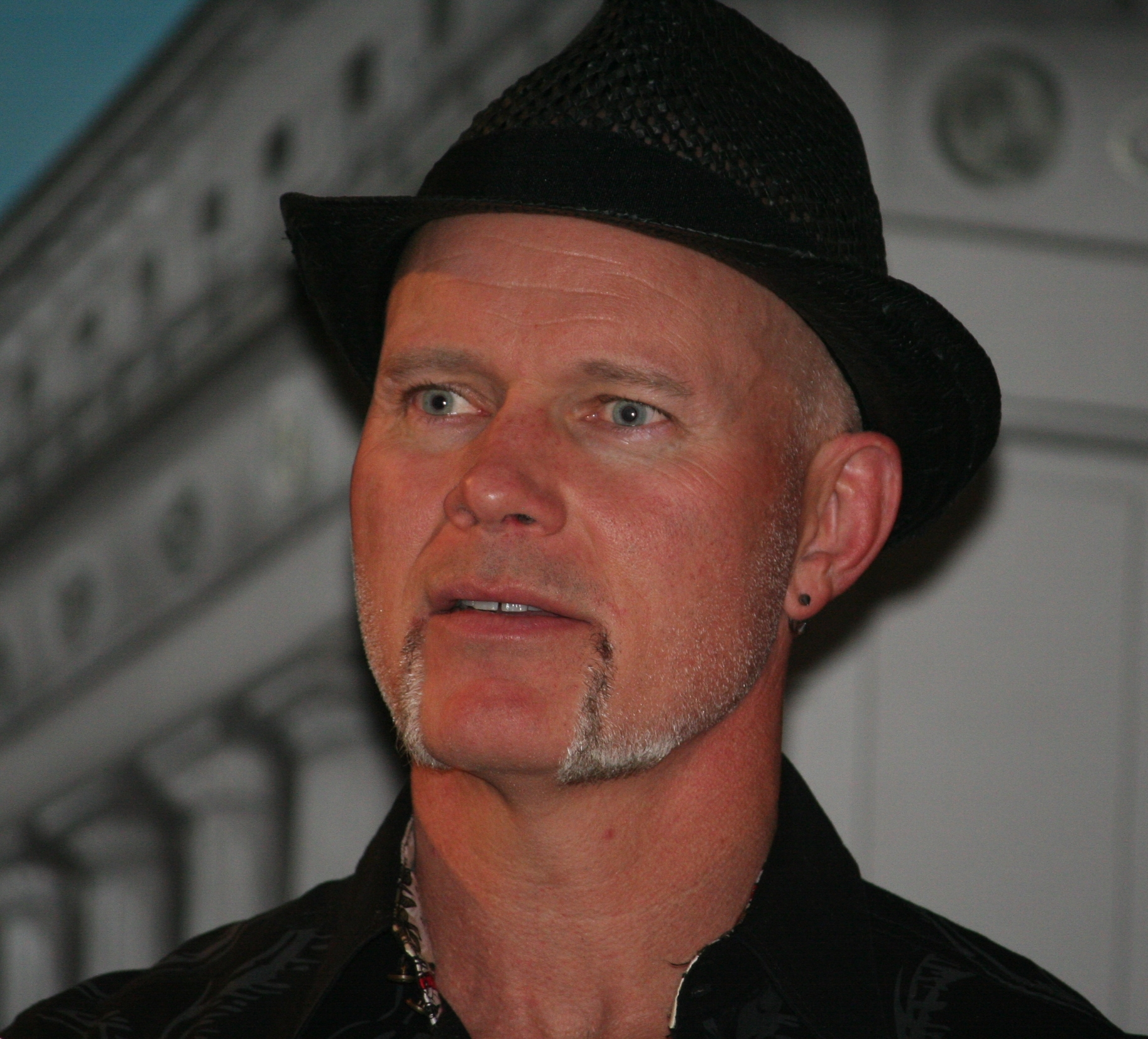

Personal information
- Born: Bradley Cain; September 8, 1970 (age 55) Asheboro, North Carolina, U.S.
- Education: East Carolina University

Professional wrestling career
- Ring name(s): Brad Cain; Brad Kane; Idol; Lodi; Lodi Lane; Rave; Rage; Razen Cain
- Billed height: 5 ft 10 in (1.78 m)
- Billed weight: 220 lb (100 kg)
- Billed from: Pennsylvania; West Hollywood, California; Asheboro, North Carolina
- Trained by: C. W. Anderson; George Weingroff; WCW Power Plant
- Debut: 1997

Bradley Cain (born September 8, 1970) is an American author, personal trainer and professional wrestler, better known by his ring name, Lodi. Cain is best known for his appearances with World Championship Wrestling (WCW) between 1997 and 2000, where he was a member of Raven's Flock stable and the tag team The West Hollywood Blondes.

== Early life ==
After graduating from Eastern Randolph High School, Cain attended East Carolina University in 1988, and graduated with a degree in political science in 1993. During his time in college, Cain was both a member of the United States Army Reserve, serving as an operating room specialist, and a bodybuilder.

== Professional wrestling career ==
=== Early career (1997) ===
In 1997, Cain trained as a wrestler under Extreme Championship Wrestling alumnus C. W. Anderson. He debuted later that year, and began wrestling on the independent circuit either as a singles competitor or with his roommate Curtis White, who competed under the ring name Toad, as the tag team Dangerous Minds.

=== World Championship Wrestling (1997–2000) ===
==== The Flock (1997–1998) ====
Lodi was a friend of Raven who helped him get a contract with WCW. After being signed by World Championship Wrestling, Cain began training in their Power Plant wrestling school. Prior to debuting on television, he was forced to adopt a new ring name due to his Razen Cain ring name being seen as too similar to the name of another wrestler from the World Wrestling Federation, then WCW's main rival. The name was also turned down due to it being used by an independent wrestler, despite the fact that Cain wrestled under it prior to the wrestler who adopted it began using it. Another proposed ring name, Skank, was also turned down due to an independent wrestler having used it for two years.

At World War 3 on November 23, 1997, Cain debuted under the ring name Lodi ("Idol" spelled backwards, which came about due to his perceived resemblance to rock musician Billy Idol). Lodi was introduced as a member of Raven's Flock as an injury replacement for Stevie Richards. He accompanied his fellow Flock members to ringside carrying a variety of signs, which he displayed to the audience at intervals (a gimmick borrowed from ECW's Sign Guy Dudley). The signs were generally intended to be humorous and variously furthered storylines, antagonized the audience, promoted the Flock, and made inside jokes aimed at other wrestlers or groupies. Cain made his in-ring debut on the December 8 episode of Nitro, losing to Chris Benoit. Lodi disappeared from WCW television several months later after suffering a fractured ankle in a match against Psicosis. Upon his return, Lodi would become involved in the feud between Saturn and Raven. Lodi defeated Saturn in a match on WCW Thunder thanks to Kanyon, which then meant Saturn had to be Lodi's personal assistant till the PPV. After weeks of making a mockery of Saturn, The Flock disbanded at the September 13, 1998 Fall Brawl when Perry Saturn defeated Raven to win the freedom of the Flock.

==== West Hollywood Blondes (1999–2000) ====
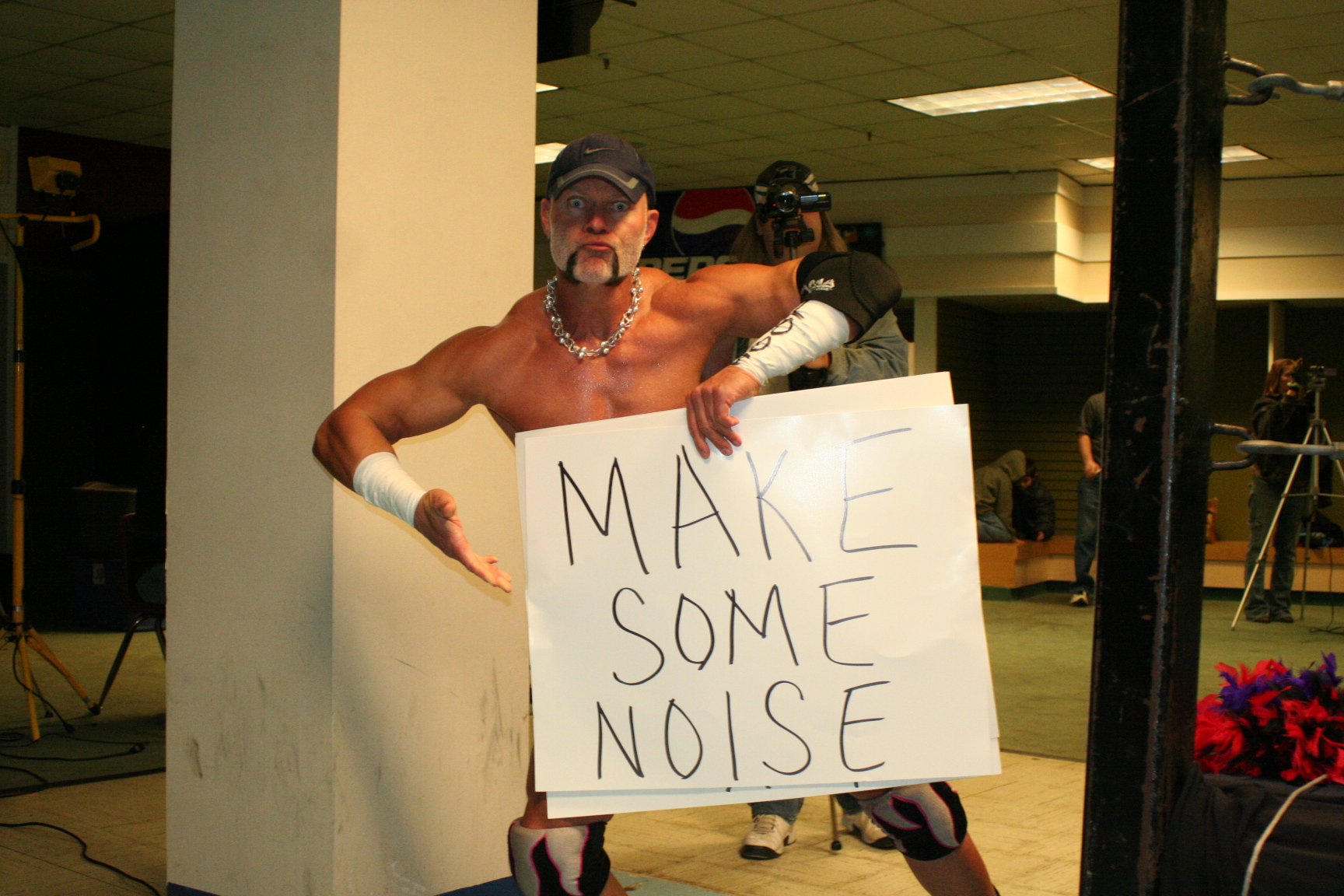
Lodi in 2011 holding one of his signature signs.

In June 1999, WCW enhancement talent Lenny Lane persuaded Lodi to team with him as the West Hollywood Blondes, a gay Californian duo with pink trunks and flamboyant haircuts who were later revealed to be brothers. The name was a reference to the Hollywood Blonds, a popular tag team of the early 1990s consisting of Steve Austin and Brian Pillman. The Blondes were highly controversial, and their depiction of homosexuality was protested by the Gay and Lesbian Alliance Against Defamation (GLAAD). Entertainment Media Director Scott Seomin wrote in a letter sent to Turner Network Television president Brad Siegel, stating, "The character of Lenny is presented with the intention to incite the crowd to the most base homophobic behavior." Seomen later stated "the audience's reaction [to Lenny and Lodi being physically attacked by other wrestlers] gives permission to viewers to do harm to gay people in a very literal way – it's appalling." TNT quickly capitulated to the demands of GLAAD, removing Lenny and Lodi from the active roster for six months. It is rumored that the bad press caused by the incident was a determining factor in the firing of Eric Bischoff as vice president of WCW by Ted Turner.

After the hiatus, Lane and Lodi returned to television under the team name Standards and Practices with Miss Hancock as their manager. The name was intended to lampoon the censorship of TNT. The gimmick ended when Lane and Lodi stripped off their suits on an edition of Nitro. In the following weeks, they competed under the tag name 2XS (an abbreviation of "too excess" that was later shortened to XS) as two hard rock partygoers, during which Lodi's ring name was changed to "Idol" and then to "Rave". This was also short-lived, and both were released from WCW in 2000. Cain believes that his addiction to painkillers and drinking problem at this time led to the loss of his job.

=== Independent circuit (2000–2009) ===
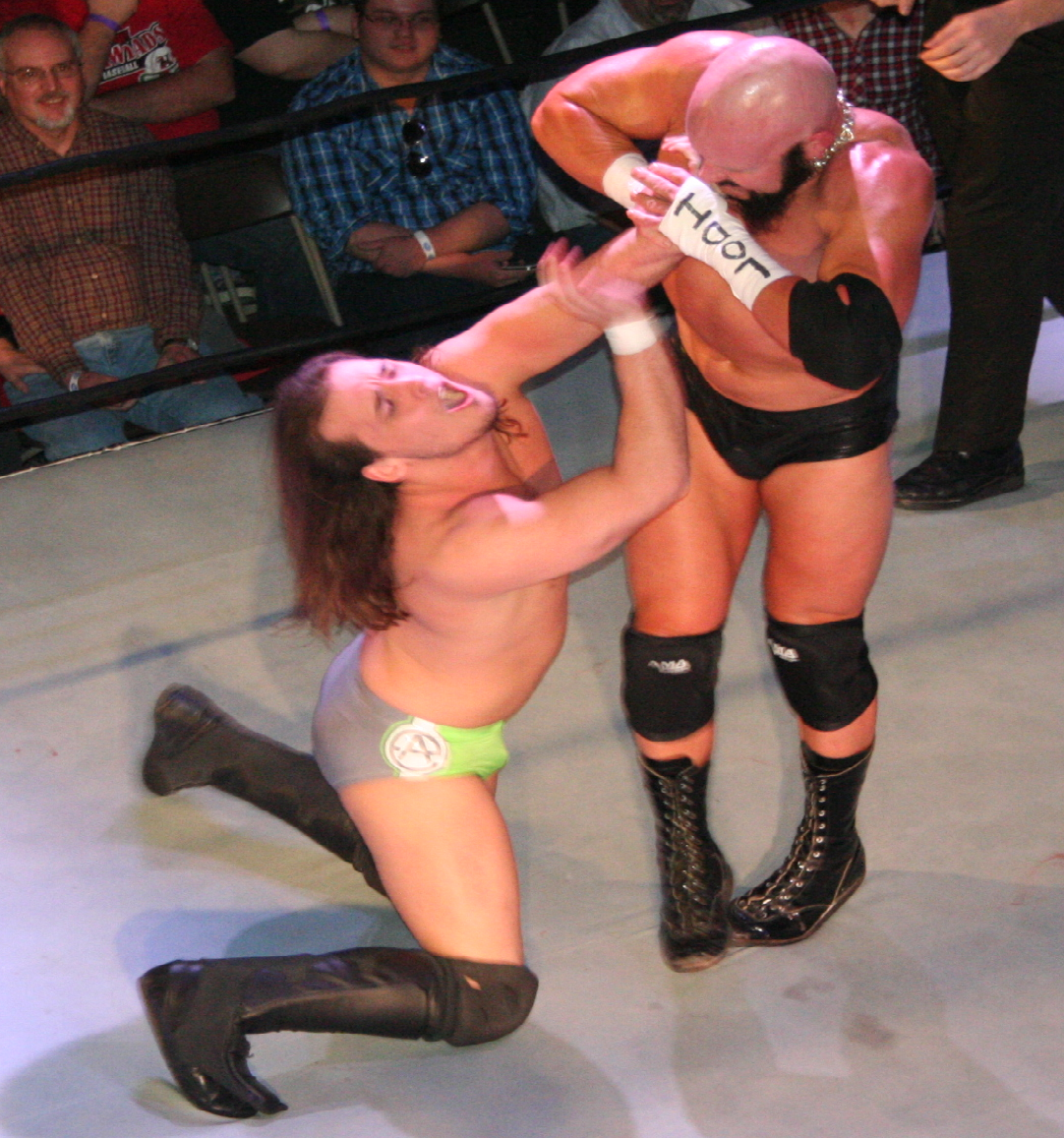
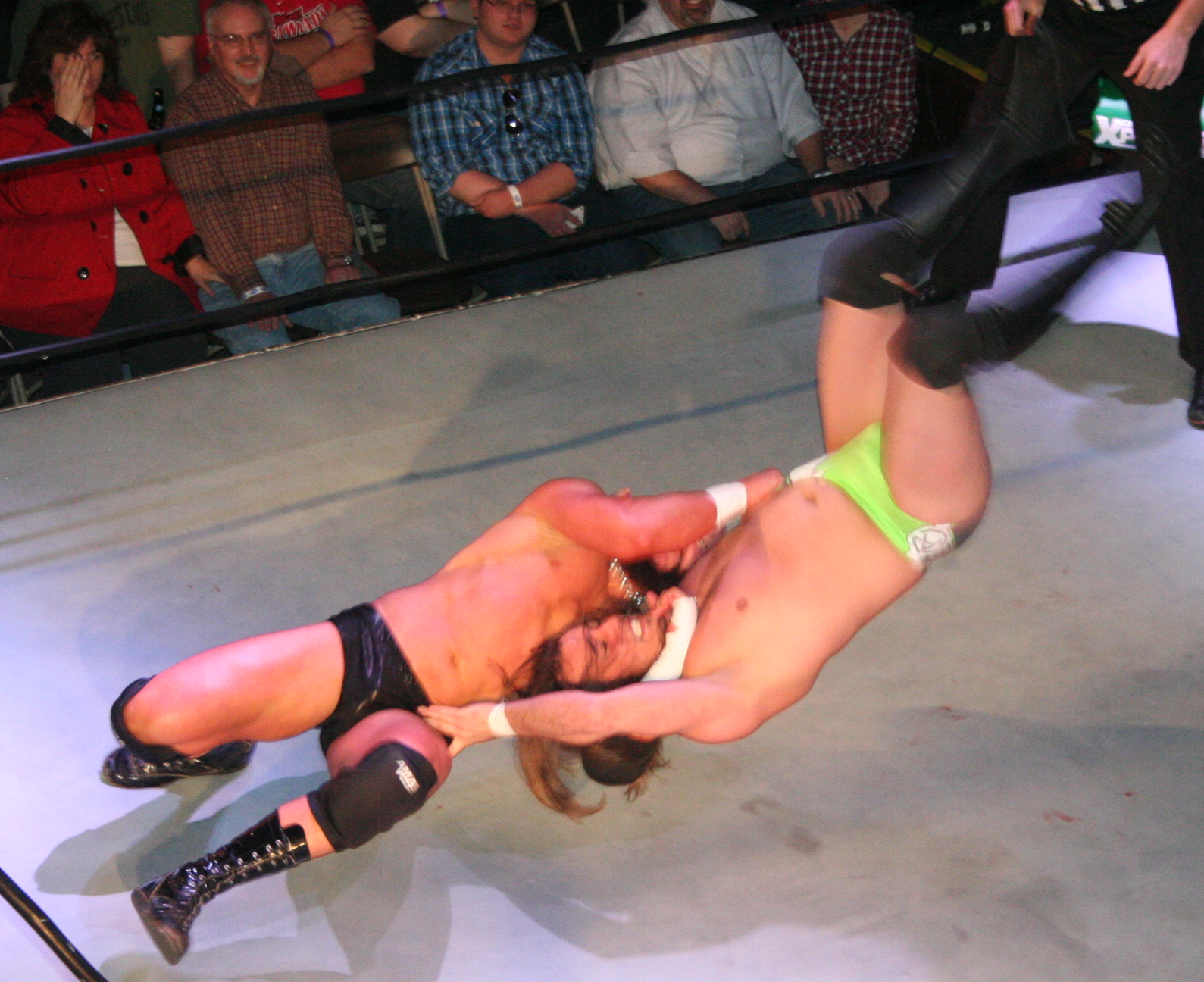
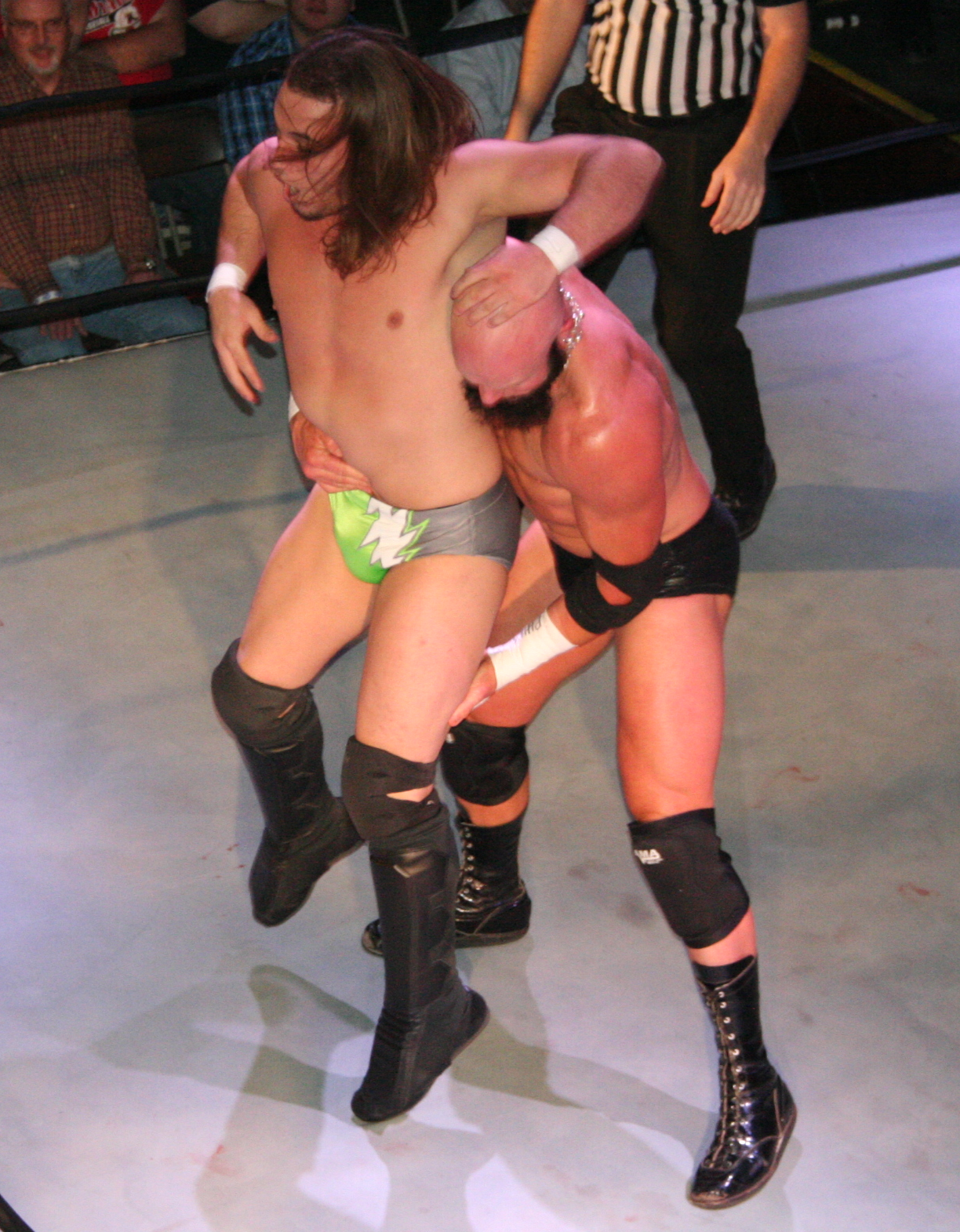
Lodi wrestling Andrew Everett in January 2013.

After WCW, Lenny and Lodi teamed up again on the independent circuit, wrestling for the World Wrestling All-Stars. They were scheduled to appear with Jeff Jarrett's Total Nonstop Action Wrestling promotion, but Cain was injured. He was sidelined from wrestling for nineteen months while recovering from neck surgery, resulting in Lenny forming a new tag team named the Rainbow Express with Bruce serving as a substitute partner. After recovering, Cain took a hiatus from wrestling before returning on September 18, 2004, under his Lodi ring name, where he defeated Mike G in a match for NWA Wildside. Cain then continued to wrestle sporadically through the next few years before joining NWA Charlotte in 2009.

Upon NWA Charlotte's debut in early 2009, Cain joined the territory as a color commentator alongside Tim Dixon. In addition to commentating, Cain also began wrestling for the territory under his Lodi ring name, most notably against Raven while also competing in title matches for the territory's United States and Heavyweight Championships. Cain remained with the territory until its closing on July 3. Following NWA Charlotte's closure, Cain took another hiatus from wrestling.

=== Late career (2012–present) ===
He returned to wrestling on July 6, 2012, under his Lodi ring name, where he defeated Reid Flair in a match for Premiere Wrestling Xperience. Cain then competed in several more matches for both PWX and the Renegade Wrestling Alliance through the next few months. On 7 December 2013 Lodi beat Ryan Edmonds to capture the RWA Heavyweight Championship, but then lost it to Edmonds on 17 May 2014.

On November 2, 2014, Lodi and Sick Boy reunited to win the WrestleForce Tag Team Championship from The Bravado Brothers. The Folk lost the titles against The Bravado Brothers on February 8, 2015.

In 2015, Lodi has signed on to teach at a new wrestling school that is being set up by Chris Sore which runs the promotion Prowrestling NOW out of Fayetteville and Concord, North Carolina.

On September 15, 2017, at Palmetto Championship Wrestling in Columbia, SC, Lodi announced his recent third neck surgery has caused doctors to say he would never wrestle again, however, he told the crowd "Never say Never."

Lodi also spent time in the formerly named Christian Wrestling Federation (now Ephesians Pro Wrestling), in Rockwall Texas, a suburb of Dallas, before parting ways with the organization.

Lodi currently wrestles for Ring Wars Carolina and independent Christian Wrestling Federation. RWC is based out of Lumberton, North Carolina. In Lodi's RWC debut, He entered the inaugural RWC Television Championship tournament where he faced a student of his “Flex Appeal” Wrestling School name Ray-Mo. He would go on to make it to the finals in a losing effort against the Caribbean Tiger. On June 19, 2021, Lodi re-United with Sick Boy to take on the Extreme Horsemen, Consisting of CW Anderson and Preston Quinn.

Lodi made his debut appearance For Shockwave Wrestling Entertainment,(an east coast promotion based in North Carolina) as a special guest tag team partner in their anniversary show.

== Personal life ==
Despite portraying homosexuals on television, Cain describes himself and his former tag team partner Lenny as "pretty much straight as nails." He refers to his fans as "Lodettes" and "Lodites".

Cain is a recovering drug addict, and was addicted to GHB and painkillers for seven years. He went into rehab in 2000 and overcame his addictions.

In addition to wrestling, Cain is a personal fitness trainer, and operates a studio named Your FLEX Appeal in Charlotte, North Carolina. On May 17, 2004, Cain lost a number of personal possessions when his apartment building burned down.

In November 2005, Cain's first novel, Perfect, was published by Dog Ear Publishing.

Lodi is a born-again Christian and often uses his wrestling appearances to share his testimony.

== Championships and accomplishments ==
- Xtreme World Wrestling
  - XWW Television Championship (2 time)
- AIWF Mid-Atlantic Championship Wrestling
  - AIWF Mid-Atlantic Heavyweight Championship (1 time)
- WrestleForce
  - WrestleForce Tag Team Championship (1 time) - with Sick Boy
- Mid-Atlantic Championship Wrestling^{1}
  - NWA Mid-Atlantic Hardcore Championship (1 time)
- Renegade Wrestling Alliance
  - RWA Heavyweight Championship (1 time)
- Tarheel Wrestling Entertainment
  - TWE Heavyweight Championship (1 time)
- Turnbuckle Championship Wrestling
  - TCW Hardcore Championship (1 time)

^{1}This Mid-Atlantic Championship Wrestling, while currently operating out of the same region of the United States and having revised some of the championships used by the original Mid-Atlantic Championship Wrestling, is not the same promotion that was once owned by Jim Crockett, Jr. and subsequently sold to Ted Turner in 1988. It is just another NWA-affiliated promotion.

== Bibliography ==
- Perfect (2005)

== See also ==
- Raven's Flock
- The West Hollywood Blondes
