= Sonny Onoo =

Professional wrestling manager and actor (born 1962)

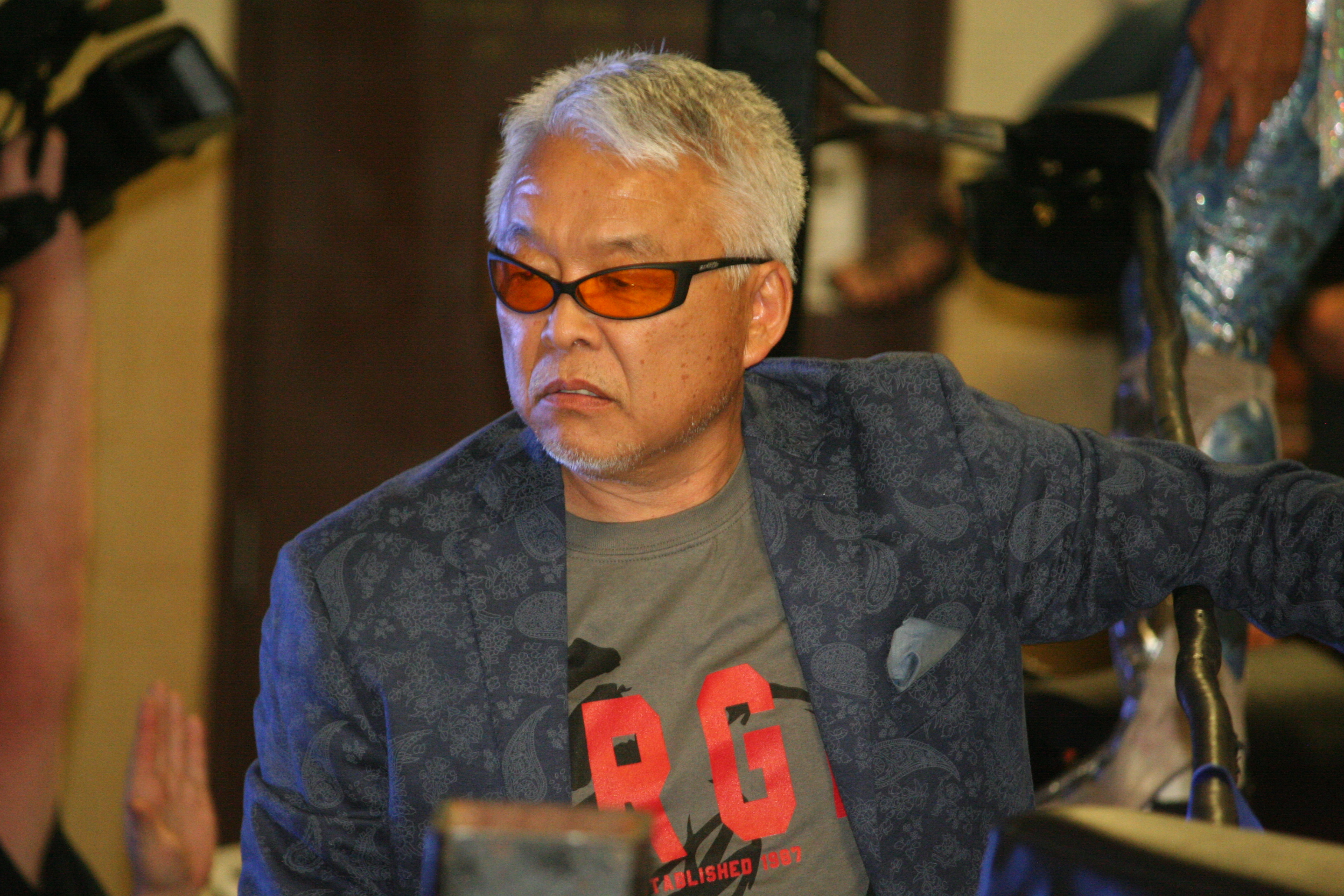
- Onoo in 2018

Personal information
- Born: Kazuo Onoo; July 29, 1962 (age 64) Japan
- Spouse: Julie Onoo
- Children: 4

Professional wrestling career
- Ring name(s): Kazuo Sonny Onoo; Kazuo Ishikawa; Kensuke Ishikawa; Sonny Onoo
- Billed from: "His many homes around the world."
- Debut: March 1995
- Retired: November 1999

Kazuo Onoo (born July 29, 1962) is a Japanese-American professional wrestling manager, and actor better known by his ring name Sonny Onoo (/ˈoʊnoʊ/ OH-noh). He is best known for his appearances with World Championship Wrestling between 1995 and 1999 as the manager of many of the promotion's Japanese performers. He now lives modestly with his family and owns XTC Auto in Mason City, Iowa.

== Early life ==
Onoo was a qualified martial artist, competing in international kickboxing and martial arts tournaments between 1975 and 1987. The Professional Karate Association named him the best bantamweight in the world, and he won numerous accolades. While touring as a martial artist, Onoo befriended Eric Bischoff in the 1970s.

== Professional wrestling career ==
=== World Championship Wrestling (1994–1999) ===
In 1994, Bischoff, by now the president of World Championship Wrestling (WCW), hired Onoo as an off-camera international consultant. Onoo was the liaison between WCW and New Japan Pro-Wrestling (NJPW), negotiating the talent exchange programs that saw numerous Japanese performers appear with WCW. Onoo's on-screen debut (billed as karate champion Kazuo Sonny Onoo) was in March 1995 at the Uncensored pay-per-view as a special referee in a Martial Arts match between Hacksaw Jim Duggan and Meng. A month later, he would be seen again as Kensuke Ishikawa, a member of the WCW International committee who voted for Ric Flair to be reinstated as a wrestler (Flair had lost a retirement match to Hulk Hogan at the 1994 Halloween Havoc). Onoo (referred to as Kazuo Ishikawa) also co-hosted the WCW presentation of Collision in Korea alongside Eric Bischoff and Mike Tenay.

Later in 1995, Onoo became the on-screen manager Sonny Onoo, translating for a number of Japanese wrestlers who could not speak English. His signature look consisted of a stylish suit and small sunglasses. At Starrcade on December 27, 1995, Onoo led Team New Japan (Jushin Thunder Liger, Koji Kanemoto, Masahiro Chono, Masa Saito, Shinjiro Otani, Hiroyoshi Tenzan and Kensuke Sasaki) against Team WCW in a best-of-seven World Cup series. When Chono made a special appearance on WCW Monday Nitro in 1996, Chono immediately turned on him and became the first international member of the New World Order (nWo). Later, in 1997, Onoo brought in another New Japan star, The Great Muta, as a mystery opponent to get revenge on Chono. Like Chono, Muta immediately turned on Onoo, spitting his mist in Onoo's face before joining Chono in nWo Japan.

During this time, Onoo also managed the Último Dragón. Thanks to his interference, Dragon defeated Dean Malenko to win the WCW Cruiserweight Championship at WCW's Starrcade pay-per-view in 1996. This win temporarily unified the title with the eight championships of the J-Crown. Dragon lost the J-Crown to Jushin Thunder Liger in Japan, while remaining WCW Cruiserweight Champion. He lost that title in a rematch with Malenko at WCW's Clash of the Champions XXXIV supercard, after botched interference by Onoo. Dragon then won the WCW Television Championship from Prince Iaukea on a Nitro in April and defended the title against former champion Steven Regal at Slamboree. Throughout the match, Onoo attempted to interfere on Dragon's behalf, but Dragon, preferring to win the match himself, admonished Onoo. Onoo then turned on Dragon, allowing Regal apply the Regal Stretch on Dragon to win back the title by submission.

In August 1996, Onoo managed Bull Nakano in her feud with Madusa. At WCW's Hog Wild event, Madusa defeated Nakano in the match with the stipulation that she was then allowed to destroy Nakano's motorcycle. At this time, Onoo also managed Malia Hosaka. Onoo then managed Akira Hokuto who won the WCW Women's Championship over Madusa in the finals of the tournament to crown the first champion on December 29 at Starrcade in Nashville, Tennessee. On April 6, 1997, Hokuto retained the title against Madusa at Spring Stampede. The feud between Hokuto and Madusa culminated in a Title vs. Career match on June 15 at The Great American Bash won by Hokuto. Madusa was forced to "retire" due to a stipulation. This was the last time Hokuto ever appeared in WCW and the Women's Championship was apparently dropped, as it was never defended or mentioned again.

Onoo also turned his attention to managing many of WCW's luchadores, taking both Psychosis and La Parka under his wing to feud with Dragon. Psychosis faced Dragon in a "Respect match" at the 1997 Great American Bash, losing by submission to the Dragon Sleeper. Later, when luchador Konnan joined the nWo, Onoo sent both Psychosis and La Parka after him in subsequent matches on Nitro, with both ending in defeat. Giving up on luchadores, Onoo managed WCW newcomer Yuji Nagata, to once again feud with Dragon. Nagata defeated Dragon by submission at Halloween Havoc and again by pinfall at World War 3, in a match where, had Dragon won, he would have five minutes in the ring alone with Onoo. Onoo parted ways with Nagata soon afterward.

Onoo later became the manager of Ernest Miller and feuded with Perry Saturn, and later Jerry Flynn. Onoo's character spoke broken English and described himself as "money-hungry, deceitful, conniving, and violent." During this time, he had a few matches, which he won. His character was originally depicted as an eccentric tourist who would take photographs of everyone he encountered. In general, their team was a reminiscence of the Jackie Chan's and Chris Tucker's characters from the film Rush Hour.

After being released by WCW in November 1999 (Bischoff was by then no longer with the company), Onoo, Bobby Walker, Hardbody Harrison and several African American wrestlers launched a racial discrimination lawsuit against AOL Time Warner. In the lawsuit, Onoo claimed wrongful dismissal. Onoo also said that he had been given a disrespectful gimmick and that his final salary—$160,000—was only half of the average pay for a wrestler at that time. The lawsuit was eventually settled out of court.

== Championships and accomplishments ==
- Wrestling Observer Newsletter
  - Worst Manager (1996–1999)

== Filmography ==
- Fearless Tiger (1991) as "Peng"
