= The Maestro (wrestler) =

American professional wrestler and actor (born 1973)

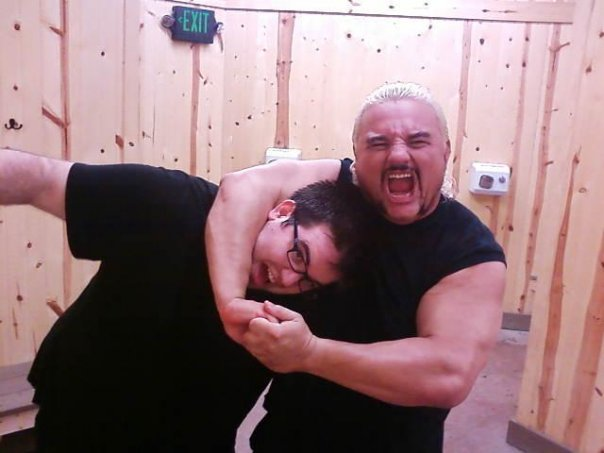

Personal information
- Born: Robert Kellum; January 26, 1973 (age 53) Raleigh, North Carolina, U.S.
- Family: Gorgeous George (great uncle)

Professional wrestling career
- Ring name(s): Gorgeous George III; The Maestro; Robbie Eagle; The Stro
- Billed height: 6 ft 1 in (1.85 m)
- Billed weight: 245 lb (111 kg; 17.5 st)
- Trained by: Nelson Royal; Gene Anderson; Ivan Koloff
- Debut: January 1, 1990

Robert Kellum (born January 26, 1973) is an American professional wrestler and actor, best known for his appearances with World Championship Wrestling under the ring name The Maestro. He has also wrestled for other promotions, including the United States Wrestling Association, Smokey Mountain Wrestling and the World Wrestling Council. He currently wrestles under the ring name The Stro. Kellum is an occasional television and film actor, having made cameo appearances on several episodes of the television series One Tree Hill.

== Professional wrestling career ==
Kellum began training for professional wrestling under Nelson Royal, Gene Anderson and Ivan Koloff. He made his professional debut on January 1, 1990, against ACW champion L.A. Stevens in Kannapolis, North Carolina. He wrestled Ivan Koloff and Wahoo McDaniel early in his career and worked in various independent promotions in the Southeastern US.

Kellum, as Robbie Eagle, debuted in Smokey Mountain Wrestling (SMW) in August 1992 and feuded with Tim Horner and Chris Candido over the SMW Beat the Champ Television Championship during 1994. In 1993, he also jobbed on a few episodes of WCW Saturday Night, including to Sting on the August 14 episode of Saturday Night.

In January 1995, Kellum began wrestling in the United States Wrestling Association (USWA) as Gorgeous George III (a nod to his great-uncle, Gorgeous George) and soon aligned himself with Tommy Rich and Doug Gilbert in their feud against PG-13, Brian Christopher, Bill Dundee and Jerry Lawler. He later teamed with Scott Hall, King Mabel and The Gambler.

In 1997, he wrestled on both days of the Lucha Libre AAA World Wide (AAA) supercard TripleMania V. On June 13, he, Jake Roberts and Killer lost to Canek, Perro Aguayo and Tinieblas, Jr. On June 15, he, Roberts, El Cobarde II and Fuerza Guerrera lost to Canek, Aguayo, Cibernético and Octagon.

In 1999 he once again worked in WCW as The Maestro, with Symphony as his valet. He feuded with Evan Karagias over the WCW World Cruiserweight Championship and also become involved in feuds with David Flair, Norman Smiley, Buff Bagwell and Ernest Miller. He regularly appeared on WCW Monday Nitro and WCW Thunder. He left the promotion after his contract expired in 2000.

Upon his departure from WCW, Kellum began operating a wrestling school out of Jacksonville, North Carolina. He later returned to the Southeastern area as The Stro competing for Atlantic Championship Pro Wrestling, Mason-Dixon Wrestling, the Independent Wrestling Federation, North American Championship Wrestling, and the National Wrestling Alliance. He was later defeated by Shark Boy in the opening round of Nick Mayberry's HCW Incredible 8 Tournament on July 13, 2002. That same year, he won the CAPW TV title and feuded with Balls Mahoney. Kellum also won the ACCW title for a second time in a rumble match in Wilmington, North Carolina and later feuded with Cold Cash D, Flex Phenom and Dave Renegade. Kellum became a two time NACW champion feuding with "Mr. USA" Tony Atlas, Ricky Morton, Jake Roberts, Carnage, and Brad Hunter, leader of a faction called "Damage Inc." along with Main Attraction and Rico Rage. Facing his former tag team partner Lodi at PPCW in Conway, South Carolina, Kellum also won the SCW title in Dayton, Ohio.

Stro won the WCEW title and feuded with Magnum T.R., Ali Steele, Ouga Booga, Justin Feeche, Bobby Eaton, and Aaron Devil. Was a part of the "Triple Heat" group along with Aaron Devil and Steve Michaels who was later replaced by P Roc. With "Mr. USA" Tony Atlas, The Patriot and Ranger Ross, he feuded with Ivan Koloff and The Russian Army in late 2005 as well as defeating The Barbarian at the Ricky Morton Benefit Show on February 2, 2006.

In American Coast Professional Wrestling, Kellum feuded with female wrestler "The Queen of Pain" Naudia, facing her in a series of intergender matches during 2005 and 2006. He defeated her for the ACPW Television Championship in an "I Quit" match in December 2005, as well as regained the ACPW Television title from her in the first intergender dog collar match against her on February 4, 2006. He later defeated her and Sgt. Chaos in a handicap match for the Ring Wars Carolina promotion on February 18, 2006.

In June, he made his DSCW debut in Supply, North Carolina, and, that same month, Kellum and Lord Everett Devore formed a tag team known as The Classics. The following month, while wrestling for the West Virginia-based NWA Mountain State, Kellum defeated The Barbarian in a Hardcore match as well as defeating Buzzsaw in White Sulphur Springs, West Virginia, on September 5, 2006. Kellum defeated Dave Renegade to win his second ACPW Heavyweight Championship on March 10, 2007. On June 9, Kellum made his ASPW debut in Elizabeth City, North Carolina, where he began feuding with Derik Flair. On September 28, Kellum joined long time heel stable the Fourth Alliance along with Stan Braddock, Sean Cruise, and Cletus Bass. The stable was managed by Dexter "The Expert" Holley. The Stro joined the Alliance at an ACPW show in Warsaw, North Carolina. He defeated Hangtime to win his third ACPW heavyweight title in Salemburg, North Carolina, on October 13. He also returned to ASCW and wrestled against Jake "The Snake" Roberts defeating him in Clarksburg, West Virginia, on November 15. Feuding with Johnny Blast and NWA Mountain State TV champion Dr. Roger Hamm in NWA Mountain State Wrestling, he defeated Frank "The Tank" Parker to win the NWA Mountain State Wrestling heavyweight championship on December 8, 2007.

On February 8, 2008, Kellum was voted 2007 NWA-MSW Wrestler of the Year. In April, it was announced that Kellum would star in upcoming horror movie 12-24. Kellum was inducted in the ACPW wrestling Hall of Fame on August 2, 2008. On March 15, 2009, Princeton, West Virginia, Stro defeated Jason "The Gift" Kincaid to become a two time NWA-Mountain State Wrestling heavyweight champion. On November 21, 2009, Mullens, West Virginia, Stro defeated "Dynamite" Derik Billings and "King" Richard to become a three time NWA-Mountain State Wrestling heavyweight champion.

On July 10, 2010, Stro became a four-time NWA Mountain State heavyweight champion. In August 2011, Stro won the NWA-MSW TV championship from Matt Conard. On May 19, 2012, and again on July 28, 2012, Stro won the APWA American championship. On October 17, 2013, Angry Panda and Stro became XWW tag team champions.

== Personal life ==
Kellum is the grand-nephew of professional wrestler Gorgeous George.

Kellum is a singer, drummer and pianist. He was a collegiate wrestler for Pembroke and Iowa State University. He has trained in mixed martial arts and Greco-Roman/freestyle wrestling. Kellum is a Christian.

Kellum was elected to the Board of Directors of Eno River Media in July 2019, and then elected as Vice President of the Board of Directors in August 2021.

== Filmography ==
Year	Title	Role	Notes
2003	One Tree Hill	Security Guard	Episode "The Search for Something More"
2008	12-24	Killer	
2009	Deader Country	The Stro	Video
2010	The Legend of Johnny Smalltie	Tony	
2011	The Indy Wrestler	Stro	
2012	History & Tradition: The Story of the National Wrestling Alliance	Stro Maestro	Documentary
2013	Get Up	Biker	Short Film
2013	Southern Iron	Iron Jester Prospect	Short Film
2014	Sleepy Hollow	Biker	Episode "And the Abyss Gazes Back"
2016	Son of Clowns	Angus	Short Film
2016	Good Behavior	Rob's Friend/Security	Various Episodes
2020	The Devil’s Daughter A Harley Quinn Story	Dr. Jeremiah Arkham	Fan Film

== Championships and accomplishments ==
- American Pro Wrestling Alliance
  - APWA American Heavyweight Championship (2 time)
  - APWA World Tag Team Championship (1 time) - with Bobby Shields, Chase Stevens, Jock Samson and Christian York
- NWA Mountain State
  - NWA Mountain State Heavyweight Championship (4 times)
- Pro Wrestling Illustrated
  - Ranked #151 in PWI Top 500 in 1995
- Smokey Mountain Wrestling
  - SMW Television Championship (1 time)
- Southern Championship Wrestling
  - SCW Heavyweight Championship (1 time)
- United Pro Wrestling Association
  - UPWA Heavyweight Championship (2 time)
  - UPWA Carolinas Championship (1 time)
- Xtreme World Wrestling
  - XWW Owner (1 time)
  - XWW Commissioner (1 time)
  - XWW Tag Team Champion (1 time)
- World Class Extreme Wrestling
  - WCEW Heavyweight Championship (1 time)
