= Max Muscle =

American professional wrestler (1963-2019)

Personal information
- Born: John Czawlytko; February 22, 1963 Texas, U.S.
- Died: June 27, 2019 (aged 56) Dundalk, Maryland, U.S.

Professional wrestling career
- Ring name(s): Big Bad John; The Brute; Max Muscle; Maxx; Maxx Muscle
- Billed height: 6 ft 4 in (1.93 m)
- Billed weight: 330 lb (150 kg)
- Trained by: WCW Power Plant
- Debut: 1992
- Retired: 2009

John Czawlytko (February 22, 1963 – June 27, 2019) was an American professional wrestler. He is best known for his appearances in World Championship Wrestling under the ring names Max Muscle, Maxx Muscle and Maxx.

== Professional wrestling career ==
=== Early career (1992–1993) ===
After a career as a bodybuilder, Czawlytko began training to become a professional wrestler. Following his training, Czawlytko adopted the ring name The Brute and began competing as part of a tag team called The Skull Crushers alongside Bryan Carreiro, who performed under the ring name The Beast.

=== World Championship Wrestling (1993–1997) ===
In 1993, Czawlytko signed a contract with World Championship Wrestling. He was sent to the WCW Power Plant for seasoning. Later in the year, he debuted on WCW television under the name Big Bad John, making appearances on the promotion's secondary television shows Saturday Night, Main Event, and Pro. In 1995, he was repackaged as a heel under the ring name Max Muscle and became Diamond Dallas Page's bodyguard, where he consistently helped Page cheat in arm wrestling contests. However, Muscle's alliance with Page ended by 1996, as Muscle broke away from Page and briefly turned face. However, this was short-lived, as Muscle joined the Dungeon of Doom later on in the year under the ring name Maxx, reverting into a heel in the process. While a member of the Dungeon, Maxx wrestled and lost to Page on the March 15, 1997 episode of Saturday Night and then again on the March 17 episode of Nitro. During the 3rd August 1997 episode of WCW Worldwide, Czawlytko wrestled his final match in a tag team match for WCW against the Steiner Brothers.

=== Retirement ===
After leaving WCW, Czawlytko took a two-year-long hiatus from wrestling. On March 11, 1999, Czawlytko competed in his return match, then under the tweaked ring name Maxx Muscle, where he and Corporal Punishment wrestled to a no contest for Maryland Championship Wrestling. On April 8, Muscle lost to Punishment in a rematch. Following losses in both singles and tag team matches, Czawlytko left MCW in mid-October and wrestled his final match on January 29, 2000, when he resumed his Maxx ring name as he defeated Felony in a match for Xtreme Pro Wrestling. In 2008 he returned to wrestling working for IHWE in Texas. Then he retired in 2009.

== Death ==
On July 1, 2019, longtime friend Diamond Dallas Page revealed on his Facebook account that Czawlytko had died on June 27, 2019.
