= Joe Gomez (wrestler) =

American professional wrestler (born 1964)

Personal information
- Born: July 2, 1964 (age 62) Tampa, Florida, United States

Professional wrestling career
- Ring name(s): Alan Iron Eagle; Bobby Bold Eagle; Joe Gomez; Johnny Gomez
- Billed height: 6 ft 4 in (1.93 m)
- Billed weight: 264 lb (120 kg)
- Trained by: Steve Keirn
- Debut: 1990
- Retired: 2006

Joe Gomez (born July 2, 1964) is an American retired professional wrestler. He is best known for his appearances with World Championship Wrestling (WCW) in the 1990s.

== Professional wrestling career ==
=== Early career (1990) ===
Gomez began wrestling in Southeastern regional promotions during the late 1980s and, while in Championship Wrestling from Florida, he and Mike Graham defeated Kendall Windham and Robert Fuller for the NWA Florida Tag Team Championship in Tampa, Florida, on May 8, 1990. Hurricane Walker replaced Graham after his retirement later that year, and Gomez and Walker loselt the titles to Sgt. Rock and Mark Starr on September 13, 1990.

=== World Championship Wrestling (1990–1991) ===
In September 1990, Gomez began wrestling in World Championship Wrestling (WCW) as "Alan Iron Eagle" substituting for Terry Taylor at the UIC Pavilion in Chicago, Illinois, on September 30. Teaming with Lou Perez against The Fabulous Freebirds on NWA Power Hour several days later, he also faced The Iron Sheik, Buddy Landell, Stan Hansen, Mike Rotunda and, in a tag team match with Tim Horner, lost to the Master Blasters (Steel and Blade) at the UIC Pavilion on November 30, 1990.

The following year, he also faced Minotaur, Moondog Rex and, in an 8-man tag team match with Steve Armstrong, Tracy Smothers and Tim Horner, defeated WCW World Heavyweight Champion Ric Flair, WCW World Television Champion Arn Anderson, Barry Windham and Sid Vicious at the Cobb County Civic Center in Marietta, Georgia, on January 14, 1991. Appearing on WCW Power Hour, he and Greg Sawyer lost to Motor City Madman and Big Cat when the Motor City Madman pinned Gomez on January 21.

In his last appearance in the promotion, he teamed with "Wildfire" Tommy Rich losing to The Fabulous Freebirds (Michael Hayes and Jimmy Garvin) at Clash of the Champions XIV on January 30, 1991.

=== Independent circuit and Japan (1991–1996) ===
Gomez competed on the independent circuit from 1991 to 1996. In 1994, he engaged in a lengthy tour of Japan with the International Wrestling Association of Japan.

=== Return to WCW (1996–1999) ===
Gomez made his return in World Championship Wrestling in early 1996 later facing V.K. Wallstreet at the first annual Ilio DiPaolo Memorial Show at the War Memorial Auditorium in Buffalo, New York, on June 7. He appeared in a backstage segment during a live interview on WCW Monday Nitro with Gene Okerlund, Bobby Heenan and Debra McMichael. After Debra McMichael was heard screaming after entering the locker room of The Four Horsemen, Gomez attempted to help and was ambushed by Arn Anderson and Ric Flair who put Gomez in a figure-four leglock. He made one of his first television appearances several weeks later, defeating Disco Inferno on Monday Nitro on June 17 in Richmond, Virginia.

The following month, he faced The Four Horsemen (Ric Flair, Arn Anderson, Chris Benoit and Steve McMichael) in an 8-man tag team match with The Renegade and The Rock 'n' Roll Express (Ricky Morton and Robert Gibson) on Monday Nitro on July 1. Several days later, he lost to Steve McMichael at Bash at the Beach in Daytona Beach, Florida, on July 7.

He later engaged in a short-lived feud with Dungeon of Doom teaming with Alex Wright and Jim Powers in a 6-man tag team match to defeat The Leprechaun, Hugh Morrus and The Taskmaster via disqualification on Monday Nitro on July 22, 1996. At Hog Wild the next month, he again faced the Dungeon of Doom losing a 6-man tag team match with Jim Powers and Mark Starr to The Taskmaster and The Faces of Fear (Meng and The Barbarian). Later that year, he also tried his luck in the newly created Cruiserweight Division losing to Juventud Guerrera at Monday Nitro on September 9, 1996.

On November 24 in Norfolk, Virginia, he participated in the 3-ring 60-man battle royal at World War 3 and was eliminated by The Giant. In December, he began teaming regularly with The Renegade and, appearing on Monday Nitro during the next several weeks facing the Amazing French Canadians (Jacques and Pierre) and High Voltage (Robbie Rage and Kenny Kaos), he and The Renegade also appeared on WCW Saturday Night where they lost to Jim Powers and Bobby Walker on January 11, 1997.

After losing to Harlem Heat at Clash of the Champions XXXIV in Milwaukee, Wisconsin, on January 21, he and The Renegade split up for a time as Gomez would appear in dark matches facing Kevin Sullivan and Lasertron on Monday Nitro during the next few weeks. Losing to Hugh Morris in a dark match at SuperBrawl VII on February 23, he again lost to him the following night on Monday Nitro.

By early March, he and The Renegade had begun teaming again as they defeated Sgt. Buddy Lee Parker and Sgt. Craig Pittman on WCW Pro after Gomez pinned Buddy Lee Parker. In a rematch against Harlem Heat on March 15, they were disqualified when The Public Enemy (Johnny Grunge and Rocco Rock) attacked Harlem Heat during the match. During the next two days, they also lost matches to Jim Powers and Bobby Walker on WCW Pro and Konnan and Hugh Morrus on Monday Nitro. After Gomez was pinned by Hugh Morris, he and The Renegade began arguing after the match.

Presumably splitting up shortly after, Gomez appeared in a singles match two days later defeating Mark Starr in a dark match on WCW Saturday Night and, on Monday Nitro days later, he was attacked by his former tag team partner while attempting to come to the defense of Chris Jericho who was being attacked by Lord Steven Regal after losing to Jericho. On April 14, he teamed with Ice Train to defeat The Extremists (Ace Darling and Devon Storm) with their valet Kimona Wanalaya in Philadelphia, Pennsylvania, on Monday Nitro.

Feuding with The Renegade over the next few weeks, he was attacked by The Renegade after he had submitted to the "Tongan Death Grip" following a match against Meng during Monday Nitro on May 31. However, The Renegade's interference backfired as he was put in the submission hold by Meng as well.

He later defeated Mr. JL on WCW Pro, however he lost matches to Buff Bagwell, Konnan, Dave Taylor and WCW United States Heavyweight Champion Jeff Jarrett during the next two months. Seen less frequently over the next two years, in one of his last appearances he defeated Bobby Eaton on WCW Saturday Night on March 13, 1999.

=== Later career (1999–2006) ===
In 1999, he left WCW to return to NWA Florida then under promoter Howard Brody defeating Al Green in Tampa on December 12. Later that month, he also appeared at a fund-raising event for the International Wrestling Federation teaming with Pat Tanaka against The Powers of Pain (The Warlord and The Barbarian) at the Bergeron Rodeo Grounds in Davie, Florida.

He had remained semi-active in the Southeastern independent circuit, competing in Florida Championship Wrestling (FCW), Maximum Pro Wrestling and NWA Florida. Retired from wrestling in 2006.

== Championships and accomplishments ==
- All Star Wrestling
  - ASW Tag Team Championship (1 time) – with Tatanka
- Championship Wrestling from Florida
  - NWA Florida Tag Team Championship (1 time) – with Mike Graham
- IWF
  - IWF Tri-State Championship (8 times)
