= World War 3 (1996) =

1996 World Championship Wrestling pay-per-view event

- Promotional poster
- Promotion: World Championship Wrestling
- Date: November 24, 1996
- City: Norfolk, Virginia
- Venue: Norfolk Scope
- Attendance: 10,314
- Buy rate: 200,000
- Tagline: Sixty Men... Three Rings... One Battle Royal... Total Destruction!

Pay-per-view chronology
← Previous; Halloween Havoc	Next → Starrcade

World War 3 chronology
← Previous; 1995	Next → 1997

The 1996 World War 3 was the second World War 3 professional wrestling pay-per-view (PPV) event produced by World Championship Wrestling (WCW). The event took place on November 24, 1996, from the Norfolk Scope in Norfolk, Virginia. Similar to the Royal Rumble format, this event marked for the first time that the winner of the World War 3 battle royal would receive a future title shot at the WCW World Heavyweight Championship.

Eight matches were contested at the event. The main event was the World War 3 battle royal to determine the #1 contender for the WCW World Heavyweight Championship. The Giant won the World War 3 battle royal by last eliminating Lex Luger. Another major match on the card was a three-way match for the WCW World Tag Team Championship, in which The Outsiders retained the title against The Faces of Fear and The Nasty Boys.

== Storylines ==
The event featured wrestlers from pre-existing scripted feuds and storylines. Wrestlers portrayed villains, heroes, or less distinguishable characters in the scripted events that built tension and culminated in a wrestling match or series of matches. Storylines between the characters played out on WCW's television programs, Monday Nitro, Saturday Night, WorldWide, Pro, Prime and Main Event.

At Halloween Havoc, The Giant defeated Jeff Jarrett by disqualification after Ric Flair attacked Giant during the match. This led to an announcement on the November 11 episode of Monday Nitro that Jarrett would be facing Giant in a rematch at World War 3.

At Halloween Havoc, Col. Robert Parker turned on Harlem Heat during their World Tag Team Championship title defense against The Outsiders by handing Outsiders his cane, which they used on Harlem Heat to win the titles. On the November 9 episode of Saturday Night, Amazing French-Canadians defeated Harlem Heat by count-out after Harlem Heat left the ring to rescue their manager Sister Sherri from Parker. The two teams had a rematch on the November 11 episode of Monday Nitro which ended in a no contest after Sherri went after Parker. The following week, on Nitro, Parker officially aligned himself with Amazing French-Canadians during their match against The American Males. This led to a match between Harlem Heat and Amazing French-Canadians at World War 3.

At Halloween Havoc, Nick Patrick helped nWo member Syxx in defeating Chris Jericho in a match by making slow counts during Jericho's pinfall attempts on Syxx. Jericho's manager Teddy Long protested on Patrick's actions, which led to Patrick's lawyer Al Sharp reminding everyone that Long used to be a senior referee and got suspended due to his dirty tactics. Patrick continued his unfair officiating in matches. On the November 11 episode of Monday Nitro, Patrick disqualified Jericho in a match against Konnan when Konnan kicked Jericho into Patrick. On the November 16 episode of Saturday Night, Jericho challenged Patrick to a match at World War 3, with Jericho's one arm tied behind his back. The match was made official on the November 18 episode of Monday Nitro.

At Halloween Havoc, Dean Malenko defeated Rey Misterio, Jr. to win the Cruiserweight Championship. On the November 9 episode of Saturday Night, Malenko defeated Misterio in a rematch to retain the title. On the November 11 episode of Monday Nitro, Sonny Onoo introduced the J-Crown Champion Ultimate Dragon to WCW as his newest client during a match between Misterio and Ciclope. Malenko came to watch the match and Psychosis showed up to watch Malenko. This would lead to a Cruiserweight Championship match between Malenko and Psychosis and a match between Misterio and Dragon for the J-Crown Championship at World War 3.

Another storyline, which did not lead to a match at the event, involved Roddy Piper's arrival in WCW and his immediate targeting of Hulk Hogan. At the end of Halloween Havoc, Piper made his debut for the company and had a heated conversation with Hogan. In the weeks that followed, he had campaigned for a match with Hogan but had been repeatedly stonewalled. WCW Executive Vice President Eric Bischoff repeatedly claimed an agreement could not be reached, but on the November 18 edition of Nitro, Piper came out to confront Bischoff, calling him a liar. It was revealed that Bischoff had been working for the New World Order all along, which was punctuated with the group came out to defend Bischoff after Piper physically accosted him.As the show closed, Piper said he would be coming to World War 3 with a contract for Hogan to sign "in (his) teeth".

== Event ==
=== Preliminary matches ===
Other on-screen personnel
Role:	Name:
Commentators	Tony Schiavone (also during Ring 2 of WW3)
Commentators	Bobby Heenan (also during Ring 2 of WW3)
Commentators	Dusty Rhodes (also during Ring 1 of WW3)
Commentators	Mike Tenay (during Ring 1 of WW3)
Commentators	Larry Zbyszko (during Ring 3 of WW3)
Commentators	Lee Marshall (during Ring 3 of WW3)
Interviewer	Gene Okerlund
Ring announcer	David Penzer
Referees	Randy Anderson
Referees	Mark Curtis
Referees	Scott Dickinson
Referees	Nick Patrick

The first match that aired on the live pay-per-view featured Ultimate Dragon defending the J-Crown Championship against Rey Misterio Jr. Near the end of the match, Dragon caught Misterio mid-air and executed a sitout powerbomb for the win to retain the title.

Next, Chris Jericho took on the nWo referee Nick Patrick, with Jericho's one arm tied behind his back. Patrick took advantage of the stipulation for most of the match until Jericho pulled him from the top rope and nailed a superkick for the win.

Next, Jeff Jarrett took on The Giant. Near the end of the match, Sting made his return in a new attire under a crow paint and delivered a Scorpion Death Drop to Jarrett behind the referee's back, allowing Giant to hit a chokeslam on Jarrett for the win.

The contract signing for the Roddy Piper-Hollywood Hulk Hogan was next. Piper came out with the contract, but instead of Hogan immediately coming out, Eric Bischoff came out with Ted DiBiase and Vincent to act on Hogan's behalf. Piper refused to deal with them and demanded Hogan sign a contract for a no-disqualification match at Starrcade the next month; Hogan then came out and made fun of Piper's artificial hip, then signed the contract. He then hit Piper repeatedly in the hip before leaving, but Piper rose and said Hogan would have to do better than that to keep him down.

Next, Harlem Heat (Booker T and Stevie Ray) took on Amazing French Canadians (Jacques Rougeau and Carl Ouellet) in a tag team match which stipulated that if Harlem Heat won then their manager Sister Sherri would get five minutes alone with Amazing French Canadians' manager Col. Robert Parker. Booker nailed a Harlem Hangover to Ouellet for the win after Ouellet missed a diving senton on Stevie Ray. As a result, Sherri earned the right to face Parker in a match. The match ended abruptly when Amazing French Canadians pulled Parker out of the ring, causing him to lose via countout and then Harlem Heat chased him to the backstage.

Later, Dean Malenko defended the Cruiserweight Championship against Psychosis. Malenko pinned Psychosis with a bridge to retain the title.

In the final match on the undercard, The Outsiders (Scott Hall and Kevin Nash) defended the World Tag Team Championship against Faces of Fear (Meng and The Barbarian) and The Nasty Boys (Brian Knobbs and Jerry Sags) in a triple threat match. Hall hit Knobbs with Hart's megaphone, allowing Nash to execute a Jackknife to Knobbs to retain the title.

=== Main event match ===
The main event was the namesake World War 3 battle royal. Before they even got in the ring for the World War 3 match, the Four Horsemen and the Dungeon of Doom battled outside of Ring #3, with Chris Benoit, The Taskmaster and Big Bubba Rogers battling into the crowd. In the ensuing commotion WCW television announcer Lee Marshall (working the ring with Larry Zbyszko), was knocked down and legitimately kicked to the head and chest by the Dungeon's Faces of Fear while lying on the floor and could be heard yelling "What the heck is going on out here?". After the fight moved back toward the locker room, Marshall managed to get himself up and, after some difficulty (and questioning why former wrestler Zybysko didn't come to his aid), finished commentating the match from his designated announcing position. Lex Luger from WCW's side was left alone alongside the nWo members Kevin Nash, Scott Hall, Syxx and The Giant. Luger eliminated Hall and Syxx and then applied a Torture Rack on Nash and Giant tossed both men over the top rope to win the World War 3.

== Reception ==
WCW earned $118,000 in ticket sales with an attendance of 10,314. The pay-per-view received a buyrate of 0.55.

World War 3 received mixed reviews from critics. Jack Bramma of 411Mania rated the event 6.5 out of 10, writing "A much better WW3, some good cruiserweight matches and a shockingly enjoyable triple threat power tag match make this a recommendation. The nWo had taken over but hadn't gotten but so lazy and hadn't siphoned everyone's heat and storylines just yet. Worth a look."

Wrestling 20 Years Ago star gave the event a rating of 3 out of 10, considering the arena Norfolk Scope " the best part" of the event.

== Aftermath ==
Hollywood Hogan and Roddy Piper had signed a contract at World War 3 to compete in the main event of Starrcade, where Piper defeated Hogan.

The Giant's elimination of Lex Luger to win the World War 3 led to the two signing a contract on the December 9 episode of Monday Nitro for a match at Starrcade, which Luger won.

Faces of Fear continued their rivalry with The Outsiders after World War 3, leading to a match between the two teams for the World Tag Team Championship at Starrcade, which Outsiders won to retain the titles.

== Results ==
No.	Results	Stipulations	Times
1^{D}	La Parka defeated Villano IV	Singles match	—
2	Ultimate Dragon (c) (with Sonny Onoo) defeated Rey Misterio Jr.	Singles match for the J-Crown Championship	13:48
3	Chris Jericho (with Teddy Long) defeated Nick Patrick	Singles match	8:02
4	The Giant defeated Jeff Jarrett	Singles match	6:05
5	Harlem Heat (Booker T and Stevie Ray) (with Sister Sherri) defeated The Amazing French-Canadians (Jacques Rougeau and Carl Ouellet) (with Col. Robert Parker)	Tag team match	9:14
6	Sister Sherri defeated Col. Robert Parker by countout	Singles match	1:30
7	Dean Malenko (c) defeated Psychosis	Singles match for the WCW Cruiserweight Championship	14:33
8	The Outsiders (Scott Hall and Kevin Nash) (c) defeated Faces of Fear (Meng and The Barbarian) (with Jimmy Hart) and The Nasty Boys (Brian Knobbs and Jerry Sags)	Triangle match for the WCW World Tag Team Championship	16:11
9	The Giant won by last eliminating Lex Luger	60-Man World War 3 match for a future WCW World Heavyweight Championship match^{1}	28:21
(c) / – the champion(s) heading into the match; D / – this was a dark match

^1Other competitors were Arn Anderson, Marcus Bagwell, The Barbarian, Chris Benoit, Big Bubba, Jack Boot, Bunkhouse Buck, Ciclope, Disco Inferno, Jim Duggan, Bobby Eaton, Mike Enos, Galaxy, Joe Gomez, Jimmy Graffiti, Johnny Grunge, Juventud Guerrera, Eddy Guerrero, Scott Hall, Prince Iaukea, Ice Train, Mr. JL, Jeff Jarrett, Chris Jericho, Kenny Kaos, Konnan, Lex Luger, Dean Malenko, Steve McMichael, Meng, Rey Misterio Jr., Hugh Morrus, Kevin Nash, Scott Norton, Carl Ouellet, Diamond Dallas Page, La Parka, Craig Pittman, Jim Powers, Robbie Rage, Stevie Ray, Lord Steven Regal, The Renegade, Scotty Riggs, Roadblock, Jacques Rougeau, Tony Rumble, Mark Starr, Rick Steiner, Ron Studd, The Taskmaster, Syxx, Booker T, Squire David Taylor, Ultimo Dragon, Villano IV, Michael Wallstreet, Pez Whatley and Alex Wright
