= High Voltage (professional wrestling) =

Professional wrestling tag team

Tag team
- Name: High Voltage
- Members: Robbie Rage; Kenny Kaos
- Billed heights: Rage: 5 ft 10 in (1.78 m); Kaos: 6 ft 0 in (1.83 m)
- Combined billed weight: 504 lb (229 kg)
- Billed from: Anchorage, Alaska
- Debut: June 3, 1996
- Disbanded: September 5, 1998
- Trained by: WCW Power Plant

High Voltage was a tag team in World Championship Wrestling between 1996 and 1998. The team consisted of Robbie Rage and Kenny Kaos. They also feuded with nWo Japan in New Japan Pro-Wrestling.

== History ==
=== World Championship Wrestling (1996–1998) ===
==== Beginnings ====
Rob Knapik and Ken Stasiowski were two best friends who enrolled and trained at the WCW Power Plant during 1995. The Power Plant put them together as a tag team and gave them the name High Voltage, taken from a tape sent in by Matt Hardy who was using the name at the time. Knapik was given the in-ring name of "Robbie Rage" and Stasiowski was dubbed "Kenny Kaos" (with Rage known as Ruckus for a short time). At the time, WCW was bringing in wrestlers from AAA, ECW, and the World Wrestling Federation (WWF); High Voltage were among the first homegrown talent to appear on WCW programming. They fought at a house show for WCW on April 27, 1996 when they lost to the State Patrol (Buddy Lee Parker and James Earl Wright).

==== 1996 ====
Rage and Kaos made their debut on the June 3, 1996 edition of WCW Monday Nitro losing to The Faces of Fear. This was followed nine days later by a loss to Scott Norton and Ice Train at a WCW Saturday Night taping in Anderson, South Carolina. Cast initially into the role of jobbers, the young team next made an appearance on the July 13, 1996 edition of Saturday Night, where they were defeated by The American Males (Marcus Alexander Bagwell and Scotty Riggs). They would also lose televised matches that summer to Eddie Guerrero and Chavo Guerrero Jr., The Steiner Brothers, The Rock 'n' Roll Express, and WCW World Tag Team Champions Harlem Heat.

On August 10, 1996, High Voltage made their PPV debut, wrestling The Nasty Boys at Hog Wild in a losing effort. This was followed by losses to The Four Horsemen, The Public Enemy, and The Dungeon of Doom. On September 23, High Voltage returned to Nitro and were defeated by The Outsiders (Scott Hall and Kevin Nash). On the September 28, 1996 edition of Saturday Night, they faced WCW World Tag Team Champions The Public Enemy and were defeated, and the following week they fell to The Amazing French Canadians. Their winless streak continued as October began, with Rage and Kaos losing again to the Faces of Fear.

Finally, on October 8 at a WCW Saturday Night taping in Greenswood, SC they won their first match. Wrestling in a dark match, High Voltage defeated The Starbuck Brothers (Joe Joe Starbuck & Rocket Starbuck). Rage and Kaos extended their winning streak by defeating Public Enemy by forfeit at a house show in Tupelo MS after Johnny Grunge was unable to compete. Following another loss to the Faces of Fear on the house show circuit, High Voltage got the biggest win of their nascent careers when the upset The Fantastics in a WCW Saturday Night dark match on October 22, and this would see the beginning of a gradual move out of the cellar of WCW's tag-team division.

They defeated The Amazing French Canadians on October 28 edition of Nitro by disqualification. On November 16 edition of WCW Saturday Night, they wrestled Hardbody Harrison and Jack Boot to a no contest when The Nasty Boys made a run-in. On November 18 edition of Nitro, High Voltage were among the WCW wrestlers attacked by The Outsiders during their Nitro invasion. On December 7 edition of Saturday Night, High Voltage lost again to The Faces of Fear. On December 14 edition of Saturday Night, they lost to The Renegade and Joe Gomez. The team received its first victory on December 29 edition of WCW Pro over Scott and Steve Armstrong.

==== 1997 ====
High Voltage began the new year with a televised loss to Harlem Heat on the January 13th edition of Monday Nitro. They rebounded on the January 25th edition of Saturday Night, defeating The Extreme (Ace Darling and Devon Storm). High Voltage began to compete regularly on WCW's growing house show circuit, facing the nWo tandem of Syxx and Vincent in multiple matches. As the winter ended Rage and Kaos continued to garner victories against lower level teams such as The Southern Posse, but were still regularly being defeated on television by teams such as The Steiner Brothers, The Faces of Fear, and the Amazing French Canadians.

Rage and Kaos faced off against Mongo McMichael and Jeff Jarrett on March 10 edition of Nitro at Club LaVela in Panama City, again falling in defeat. While they rebounded to defeat Chavo Guerrero Jr. and Billy Kidman, two cruiserweights on March 15 edition of Saturday Night, they would again lose televised matches to the Steiners and The Faces of Fear.

However High Voltage would soon see several turning points. On March 24 they defeated The Public Enemy to gain their first ever Monday Nitro victory. Following a loss the week later to the Steiner Brothers on Nitro, the duo would see their first sustained winning streak. On the April 6th edition of WCW Pro, they defeated The Southern Posse, and on the following day at Nitro, they were victorious over The Public Enemy once again. On April 12 edition of Saturday Night, High Voltage defeated Ciclope and Galaxy. Having won three victories in a week, their streak ended on April 14 edition of Nitro when they lost to Public Enemy in a Philadelphia Street Fight.

As the spring progressed the young team was now somewhat more established, but still losing matches with regularity to upper level teams like the Steiners and Harlem Heat. On June 30 they gained their biggest victory yet when they upset Wrath & Mortis on WCW Monday Nitro. Their now growing rivalry with The Public Enemy continued; after trading wins Rage and Kaos defeated Grunge and Rock on the August 30th edition. High Voltage lost their final match of the series to Public Enemy on the September 6th edition of Saturday Night in a No Disqualification Match. On September 13 edition of WCW Main Event, they defeated Villano IV and Super Calo. They lost to Glacier and Ernest Miller on September 20 edition of Saturday Night, and on November 8 edition lost to them once more.

Following this High Voltage would be sent to New Japan Pro Wrestling as part of WCW's talent sharing agreement.

==== 1998 ====
High Voltage started a feud with Harlem Heat in early 1998, wrestling them in house shows as well as WCW Pro. As in previous encounters, Voltage was unsuccessful. Following a defeat to Vicious and Delicious on February 28 edition of Nitro. they beat Bobby Walker and Bobby Eaton on the March 7th edition of Saturday Night and Disorderly Conduct the following week. On March 30 they wrestled The Destruction Crew in a Nitro dark match, and as the spring began both Robbie Rage and Kenny Kaos began to compete in singles matches.

At a house show held in Augusta, Georgia, on April 30, High Voltage began a series with members of Raven's Flock (Billy Kidman and Sick Boy). They lost most of the matches during the rivalry but defeated Kidman and Sick Boy on May 2 at an online PPV in Charleston. During that time, the team was also performing in Japan. In May they then began a house show series against the newly arrived Davey Boy Smith and Jim Neidhart, and that summer faced The Public Enemy once more along with The Villanos.

In August the team began a feud with Disco Inferno and Alex Wright, wrestling them to a no contest on the August 17th edition of Nitro. Following a victory over The Armstrong Brothers (Scott Armstrong and Steve Armstrong), High Voltage defeated Disorderly Conduct on September 3, 1998. This would be their last televised match as a team. High Voltage broke up after defeating Inferno and Wright at a house show in Jacksonville on September 5.

=== New Japan Pro-Wrestling (1997–1998) ===
Between November 1997 and February 1998, High Voltage also performed in Japan for New Japan Pro-Wrestling. Robbie Rage was performing in Japan while Kenny Kaos was representing WCW in the Super Grade Tag League. They feuded with nWo Japan in those days and wrestled in many Japanese gyms and stadiums.

=== Split ===
The duo was at the time temporarily sidelined when Robbie Rage suffered a shoulder injury. With his partner out of action for several months, Kenny Kaos began competing in solo competition, facing Perry Saturn and Stevie Ray. On October 26, 1998, he was chosen by Rick Steiner to co-defend the WCW World Tag Team Championship; the duo then defeated The Giant and Stevie Ray later that night The December 17, 1998, edition of Monday Nitro saw the return of Robbie Rage. Still wearing an arm sling, Rage angrily confronted Kaos due to the latter's teaming with Steiner. This marked the end of High Voltage, and Rage would leave WCW soon after.

=== Aftermath ===
Kenny Kaos continued on by himself in WCW in 1999. After his partnership with Rick Steiner ended he began teaming with Bobby Eaton in television matches. He would go on to face Glacier, Dallas Page, The Disciple, Erik Watts, Bill Goldberg, and others as the year progressed. Kaos teamed with Prince Iaukea in an attempt to regain the WCW Tag-Team Championship on August 30, 1998, at Monday Nitro against The West Texas Rednecks (Barry Windham & Kendall Windham but was unsuccessful. His final match came on November 11, 1999, against Lash Leroux on WCW Thunder, after which he retired.

Robbie Rage received a tryout with the World Wrestling Federation on Feb 21, 2000, in Atlanta, GA, wrestling Bull Buchanan in a dark match. He then traveled to New Japan where he participated in the NJPW Summer Struggle 2000 tour. Rage returned to World Championship Wrestling in August 2000, and his final match came weeks before the company shuttered when he lost to The Demon (Dale Torborg) at a house show in Lake Charles, Louisiana on Feb 25, 2001. Robbie would return to New Japan in 2001 and 2002, and then traveled to the World Wrestling Council in 2005. Rage became a Christian and would eventually leave in-ring competition in 2007. He did return for one more match on October 17, 2021, when he teamed with Adam Haze and Daddy Davis to defeat Cody Deaner, Ron T Legend & Zumba King Old School at the PWE Rocktoberfest 2021 event for Pro Wrestling Eclipse.
