= WCW Hog Wild =

1996 World Championship Wrestling pay-per-view event

Hog Wild
- The VHS box art for Hog Wild, featuring Hulk Hogan.
- Promotion: World Championship Wrestling
- Date: August 10, 1996
- City: Sturgis, South Dakota
- Venue: Sturgis Motorcycle Rally
- Attendance: 5,000
- Buy rate: 220,000
- Tagline: Ain't No Easy Riders Here!

Pay-per-view chronology
← Previous; Bash at the Beach	Next → Fall Brawl

Road Wild chronology
← Previous; First	Next → 1997

The 1996 Hog Wild was a professional wrestling pay-per-view (PPV) event produced by World Championship Wrestling (WCW) and the first in the Road Wild chronology. It took place on August 10, 1996, from the Sturgis Motorcycle Rally in Sturgis, South Dakota in the United States. The event took place on a Saturday instead of the Sunday more typical for pay-per-view events.

The event was notable for being the first pay-per-view event in WCW after the formation of the New World Order stable at the previous month's Bash at the Beach. In the main event, Hollywood Hogan defeated The Giant to win the WCW World Heavyweight Championship and spray-painted "nWo" on the title belt after the match. In other matches on the card, The Outsiders (Kevin Nash and Scott Hall) defeated Sting and Lex Luger while Ric Flair, Rey Misterio Jr. and Harlem Heat retained their United States Heavyweight, Cruiserweight and World Tag Team Championships respectively.

== Storylines ==
The event featured wrestlers from pre-existing scripted feuds and storylines. Wrestlers portrayed villains, heroes, or less distinguishable characters in the scripted events that built tension and culminated in a wrestling match or series of matches.

== Event ==
Other on-screen personnel
Role:	Name:
Commentators	Tony Schiavone
Commentators	Bobby Heenan
Commentators	Dusty Rhodes
Commentators	Mike Tenay
Interviewer	Gene Okerlund
Ring announcers	David Penzer
Ring announcers	Michael Buffer
Referees	Randy Anderson
Referees	Randy Eller
Referees	Nick Patrick

The opening bout was a tag team match in which The Public Enemy (Rocco Rock and Johnny Grunge) defeated Rough and Ready (Dick Slater and Mike Enos). This match and the seven following matches aired on WCW Saturday Night prior to the pay-per-view broadcast.

The second bout was a singles match between Chavo Guerrero Jr. and Konnan. Konnan won the bout by pinfall after performing Splash Mountain on Guerrero Jr.

The third bout was a tag team match pitting High Voltage (Kenny Kaos and Robbie Rage) against The Nasty Boys (Brian Knobbs and Jerry Sags). The match was won by the Nasty Boys.

The fourth bout was a singles match between Alex Wright and Earl Robert Eaton. Wright won the bout by pinfall using a body press.

The fifth bout was a six-man tag team match pitting The Dungeon of Doom (The Barbarian, Meng, and The Taskmaster) against the makeshift team of Jim Powers, Joe Gomez, and Mark Starr. The bout was won by the Dungeon of Doom.

The sixth bout was a singles match between David Taylor and Mr. J.L. Taylor won the bout by pinfall following a fallaway slam.

The seventh bout was a singles match between Diamond Dallas Page and The Renegade. Page won the bout by pinfall following a Diamond Cutter.

The eighth bout was a singles match between Arn Anderson and Hugh Morrus. Anderson won the bout by pinfall following a DDT.

The ninth bout, and the first to air on the pay-per-view broadcast, saw WCW Cruiserweight Champion Rey Misterio Jr. defend his title against Último Dragón. Misterio Jr. defeated Último Dragón to retain his title using a rana.

The tenth bout was a singles match between former tag team partners Ice Train and Scott Norton. Norton defeated Ice Train by submission using a Fujiwara armbar.

The eleventh bout was a singles match between Bull Nakano and Madusa, with the stipulation that the winner would be allowed to destroy the loser's motorcycle. The match ended when Nakano gave Madusa a bridging backdrop suplex but Madusa lifted her shoulder off the mat, resulting in Nakano herself being pinned. Following the match, Madusa destroyed Nakano's Honda motorcycle using a sledgehammer.

The twelfth bout was a singles match between Chris Benoit and Dean Malenko, with the premise that Malenko was aiming to collect a bounty that had been put on Benoit by The Dungeon of Doom. The match originally went to a time limit draw after 20 minutes, but was given two overtime periods of five minutes each. Benoit ultimately won the match by pinning Malenko using a roll-up following a distraction from his manager, Woman.

The thirteenth bout was a tag team match in which WCW World Tag Team Champions Harlem Heat (Booker T and Stevie Ray) defended their titles against The Steiner Brothers (Rick Steiner and Scott Steiner). Harlem Heat retained their titles after their valet Sister Sherri threw powder in Scott Steiner's eyes then their manager Col. Robert Parker broke his cane over Steiner's head, enabling Booker T to pin Steiner.

The fourteenth bout saw WCW United States Heavyweight Champion Ric Flair defend his title against Eddie Guerrero. The match ended when Flair applied a figure-four leglock to Guerrero, resulting in Guerrero being pinned.

The penultimate bout was a tag team match pitting The Outsiders (Kevin Nash and Scott Hall) against Sting and Lex Luger. The match ended when referee Nick Patrick seemingly accidentally fell into Luger's leg while he applied the Torture Rack to Hall, knocking Luger down and enabling Hall to pin him.

The main event saw WCW World Heavyweight Champion The Giant defend his title against Hollywood Hogan, the leader of the newly formed New World Order (nWo) stable. The match ended when Hogan's nWo stablemates Kevin Nash and Scott Hall came to the ring, enabling Hogan to hit The Giant with the title belt and pin him to become the new WCW World Heavyweight Champion. Following the match, Hogan's old friend The Booty Man came to the ring wearing an nWo t-shirt on and carrying a birthday cake for Hogan, only for Hogan, Hall, and Nash to attack him. Hogan then spray-painted "nWo" on the face of the WCW World Heavyweight Championship.

== Reception ==
Kevin Pantoja of 411mania rated the event 7 out of 10 stars and praised it, with "Most pay-per-views after the nWo featured a good undercard and a poor main event scene. Here you had three really good to great matches in Mysterio/Dragon, Benoit/Malenko and Flair/Guerrero. There was some crap like the WCW Title match but this was still actually an enjoyable show and I did not expect that."

== Results ==
No.	Results	Stipulations	Times
1^{SN}	The Public Enemy (Rocco Rock and Johnny Grunge) defeated Rough and Ready (Mike Enos and Dick Slater)	Tag team match	03:47
2^{SN}	Konnan defeated Chavo Guerrero Jr.	Singles match	04:24
3^{SN}	The Nasty Boys (Brian Knobbs and Jerry Sags) defeated High Voltage (Kenny Kaos and Robbie Rage)	Tag team match	03:22
4^{SN}	Alex Wright defeated Earl Robert Eaton (with Jeeves)	Singles match	00:30
5^{SN}	The Dungeon of Doom (The Barbarian, Meng, and The Taskmaster) (with Big Bubba and Jimmy Hart) defeated Jim Powers, Joe Gomez, and Mark Starr	Six-man tag team match	03:06
6^{SN}	David Taylor (with Jeeves) defeated Mr. J.L.	Singles match	02:37
7^{SN}	Diamond Dallas Page defeated The Renegade	Singles match	00:53
8^{SN}	Arn Anderson defeated Hugh Morrus (with Jimmy Hart)	Singles match	00:40
9	Rey Misterio Jr. (c) defeated Último Dragón (with Sonny Onoo)	Singles match for the WCW Cruiserweight Championship	11:35
10	Scott Norton defeated Ice Train by submission	Singles match	05:05
11	Madusa defeated Bull Nakano (with Sonny Onoo)	Singles match	05:21
12	Chris Benoit (with Woman and Miss Elizabeth) defeated Dean Malenko	Singles match	26:50
13	Harlem Heat (Booker T and Stevie Ray) (c) (with Col. Robert Parker and Sister Sherri) defeated The Steiner Brothers (Rick and Scott)	Tag team match for the WCW World Tag Team Championship	17:53
14	Ric Flair (c) (with Woman and Miss Elizabeth) defeated Eddie Guerrero	Singles match for the WCW United States Heavyweight Championship	14:17
15	The Outsiders (Kevin Nash and Scott Hall) defeated Sting and Lex Luger	Tag team match	14:36
16	Hollywood Hogan defeated The Giant (c) (with Jimmy Hart)	Singles match for the WCW World Heavyweight Championship	14:56
(c) / – the champion(s) heading into the match; SN / – the match was broadcast prior to the pay-per-view on Saturday Night
