= Scott Armstrong (wrestler) =

American professional wrestler referee

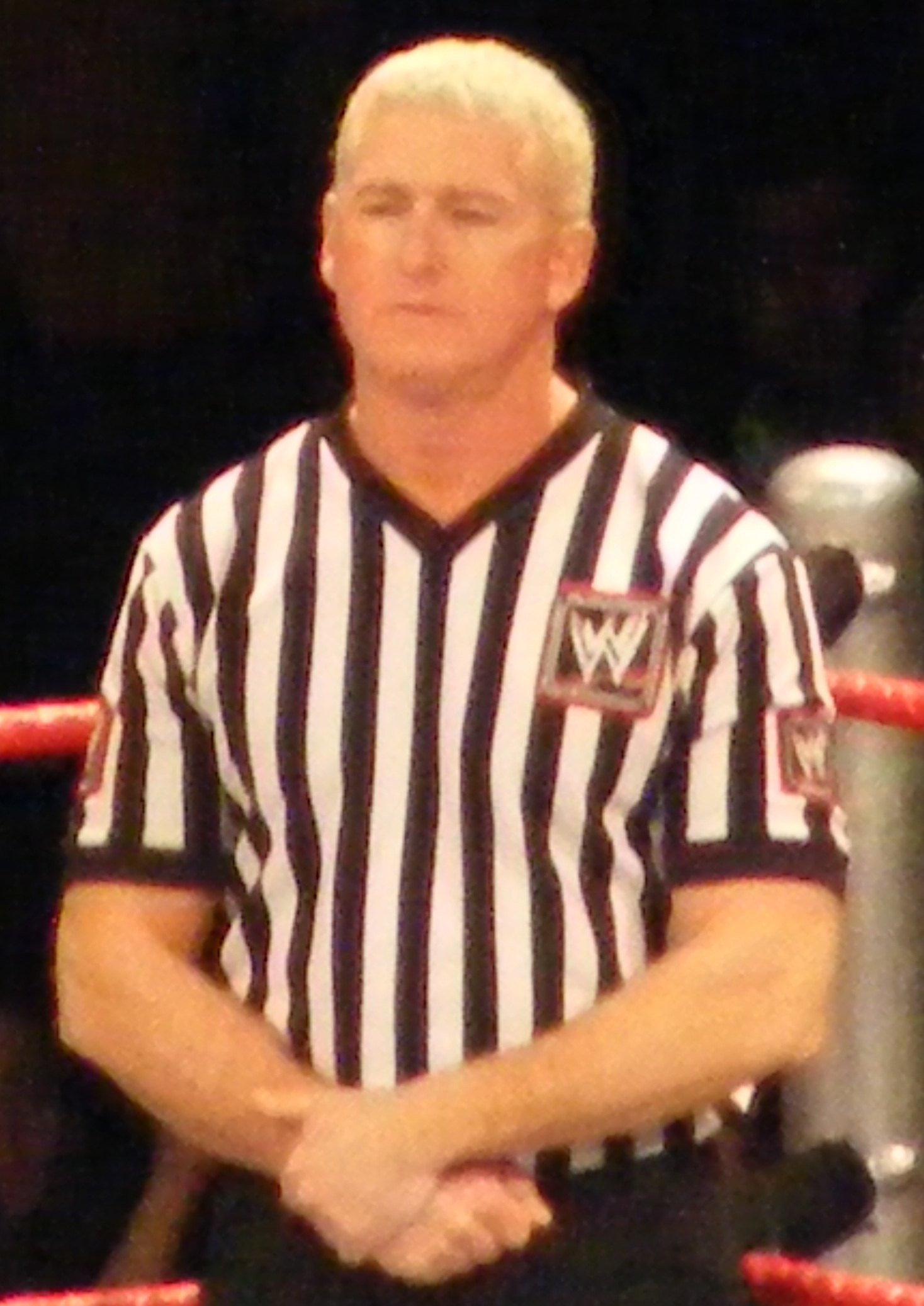
- Armstrong in 2009

Personal information
- Born: Joseph Scott James; May 4, 1961 (age 65) Marietta, Georgia, U.S.
- Spouse: Michelle James
- Children: 2
- Parent: Bob Armstrong (father)
- Family: Brad Armstrong (brother); Road Dogg (brother); Steve Armstrong (brother)

Professional wrestling career
- Ring name(s): Dixie Dynamite; Scott James; Scott Armstrong
- Billed height: 6 ft 2 in (188 cm)
- Billed weight: 220 lb (100 kg)
- Billed from: Pensacola, Florida
- Trained by: Bob Armstrong
- Debut: 1983
- Retired: October 9, 2010

Joseph Scott James (born May 4, 1961) is an American wrestling producer, former referee and retired professional wrestler better known as Scott Armstrong, who is currently signed to Diamond Championship Wrestling. He worked for WWE. James is the oldest son of Bob Armstrong and has three brothers who became wrestlers, Brad, Steve and Brian.

== Professional wrestling career ==
=== Early career (1983–1989) ===
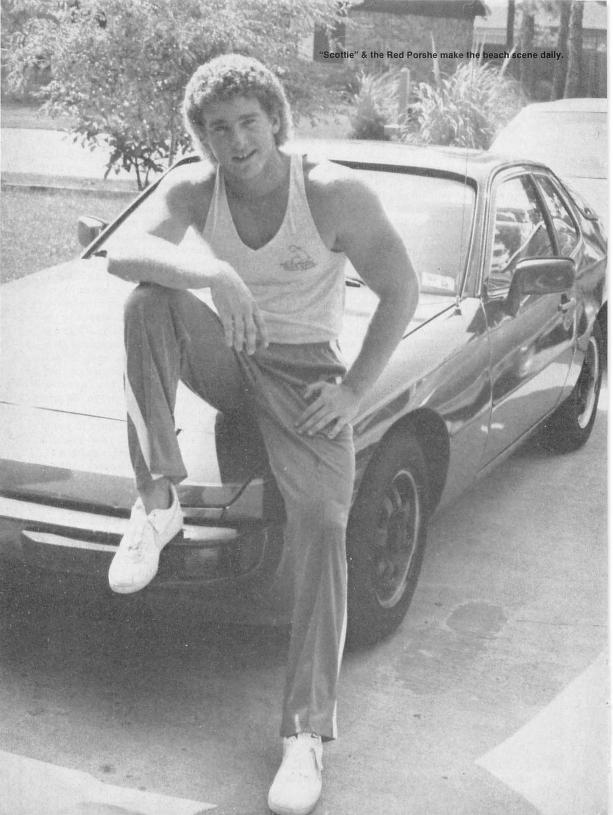
Armstrong, circa 1983

Armstrong started wrestling in 1983 as "Scott Armstrong". He wrestled primarily in the Georgia and Alabama area. On January 2, 1984, he teamed with his brother Brad Armstrong for the first time, losing to Wayne Farris and Boris Zukhov in Birmingham, Alabama.

=== World Championship Wrestling (1990) ===
Armstrong made his debut with WCW on May 27, 1990, on a house show in Los Angeles when he defeated Rick Fargo. Scott started as a preliminary wrestler, teaming with and later facing Barry Horowitz.

=== Smoky Mountain Wrestling (1991–1995) ===
Armstrong then joined Jim Cornette's Smoky Mountain Wrestling, appearing on October 30 in Greensville, South Carolina, and defeating Dutch Mantell. In March 1992 he went under a mask and was redubbed "Dix i.e. Dy-no-mite". Wrestling as Dy-no-mite, he competed in a tournament for the vacant SMW title. After defeating Carl Stiles in an opening round, wild card match he was pinned by Dirty White Boy in the quarterfinals. Despite the loss Dy-no-mite was strongly pushed and won most of his matches, while registering some losses in 1992 to Paul Orndorff and Jimmy Golden.

On May 8, 1993, he became involved in an angle with Jim Cornette on SMW TV when the manager announced that Dixie Dy-no-mite was nothing more than Scott Armstrong in a mask, and that he wore it out of shame over his father Bob Armstrong. Scott came to ringside and took off the mask, professing his love for his father. Shortly afterwards Armstrong left the promotion in September 1993.

Armstrong made only two appearances in SMW in 1994 while also wrestling in WCW. In March 1995 Armstrong returned again to SMW, this time teaming with Tracey Smothers. After teaming with his brother Steve Armstrong for two house show matches in April he left the promotion once more.

=== World Championship Wrestling (1994–2001) ===
Armstrong made his return to WCW on January 18, 1994, at a television taping for WCW Main Event where he wrestled Tony Zane. On March 6 he wrestled WCW World Television Champion Lord Steven Regal on Main Event. In August on WCW Worldwide, Armstrong was defeated by Diamond Dallas Page. On the September 10 episode of Worldwide, he faced Ron Simmons in one of the last WCW matches for the latter. On the December 17 edition of WCW Saturday Night, Armstrong wrestled Jean Paul Levesque.

Armstrong began to form teams with his brothers, which he had already done with Steve Armstrong in a one-shot appearance with Smoky Mountain in July 1994. At Starrcade '94: Triple Threat on December 27, 1994, Scott teamed with his brother Brad Armstrong and wrestled a dark match against Arn Anderson and Bunkhouse Buck. On the January 7, 1995 episode of WCW Saturday Night, Scott and Brad again teamed against Harlem Heat. A week later on WCW Pro, they would earn their first WCW victory when they defeated Bob Starr and Ricky Santana. On January 25 in a dark match at Clash of Champions XXX Brad and Scott defeated Dick Slater and Bunkhouse Buck.

The team with Brad however dissolved and Scott Armstrong began teaming with his brother Steve instead. At the July 10 taping of WCW Pro, WCW World Tag Team Champions Bunkhouse Buck and Dick Slater defeated the duo in the debut match. A month later on the August 5th, 1995 edition they fell to Arn Anderson and Ric Flair. On August 22 they faced Men at Work but were again unsuccessful.

On June 20, 1995, Armstrong wrestled Ric Flair at a WCW Pro taping in Gainesville, Georgia. On September 16, Disco Inferno would make his successful debut on WCW Saturday Night by pinning Armstrong. He made his first ever WCW PPV appearance at World War 3 on November 26, 1995, when he competed in the three ring battle royal. After being eliminated he was placed on a stretcher and put in a neck brace.

While wrestling singles matches with Konnan in the first half of 1996 under his Scott Armstrong name, Scott and Steve began competing under their real surnames as the James Brothers from time to time. On the February 17 edition of WCW Saturday Night they lost to Men At Work. In June 1996, they were defeated by the Public Enemy, and on the July 1 edition they were defeated again by Arn Anderson and Ric Flair. On the July 28, 1996, edition of WCW Worldwide they lost to Lord Steven Regal and Squire Dave Taylor. On the August 22, 1996, taping of WCW Pro, the James Brothers would finally gain their first WCW victory when they defeated Bill Payne and Rick Thames. They would go on to face the Amazing French Canadians and the Faces of Fear during the remainder of 1996.

The James Brothers would continue teaming in 1997 and faced the Amazing French Canadians and the Steiner Brothers. On the April 13, 1997 edition of WCW Worldwide they defeated the Southern Posse. After this, they moved on to a brief series of matches with Harlem Heat, and in May 1997 defeated the new duo of Jim Powers and Bobby Walker, the latter put together by Teddy Long. After this they were winless for the rest of 1997 in matches with Mortis and Wrath, as well as the Public Enemy. Their pairing continued into 1998 but again saw little success. They were winless against High Voltage in multiple encounters. At the September 13 pay-per-view Fall Brawl '98 they were involved in an angle when WCW Worldwide announcer Mike Tenay attempted to interview them, only to be interrupted by Ernest Miller who then attacked both brothers. Thirteen days later they would defeat the Power Company on WCW Saturday Night. On November 30, 1998, the duo enjoyed the biggest victory of their WCW tenure when they upset Raven and Kanyon on WCW Monday Nitro.

Success continued for the James Brothers in 1999. On January 6, 1999, they upset Alex Wright and Disco Inferno in Mobile, Alabama. In January 1999 on WCW Saturday Night, they defeated Nick Dinsmore and Mike Sullivan. The winning streak ended in April on WCW Saturday Night when they were defeated by Disorderly Conduct. On April 27, 1999, at a television taping in Bismarck, North Dakota, they faced the New World Order for the first time and defeated Vincent and Stevie Ray. On April 29, 1999, on WCW Monday Nitro, the team faced Raven in a handicap match and were victorious. Scott's teaming with Steve finally came to an end on March 1, 2000, when the James Brothers faced WCW World Tag Team Champions Big Vito and Johnny the Bull at a WCW Saturday Night taping. Shortly thereafter, Steve Armstrong left the promotion, while Scott became a referee.

=== Various promotions (2001-2006) ===
Armstrong joined TNA in 2002 as a referee for Total Nonstop Action Wrestling. On January 29, 2005, he made a return to the ring at WrestleReunion in Tampa, Florida. Armstrong participated in a 17-man battle royal along with his brother Brad and father Bob.

=== World Wrestling Entertainment / WWE (2006–2022) ===
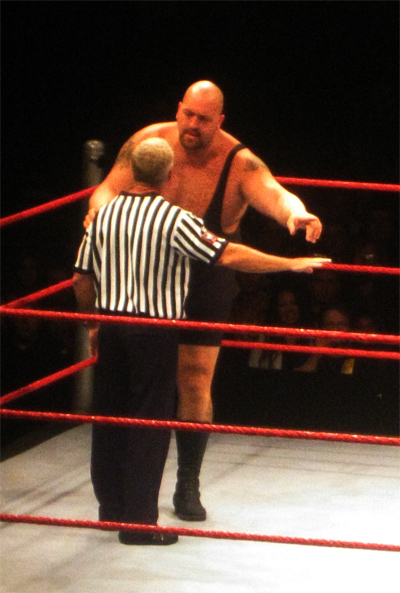
Big Show arguing with Armstrong in 2009.

Armstrong appeared on the July 28, 2006, episode of World Wrestling Entertainment's SmackDown! refereeing the WWE United States Championship match between Finlay and William Regal. In August 2006, Armstrong was hired as a full-time WWE referee, in WWE's ECW brand.

He became ECW's senior referee in February 2007 after Mickie Henson was moved to SmackDown!.

He was also the only WWE referee for the ECW brand at WrestleMania XXIV. At WWE's SummerSlam pay-per-view event on August 17, 2008, Armstrong refereed the Hell in a Cell match between Edge and The Undertaker. He then moved to the SmackDown brand, becoming its senior official. In November 2008 referees were made no longer exclusive to certain brands.

At WrestleMania 25 on April 5, 2009, Armstrong refereed the main event WWE Championship match between Triple H and Randy Orton. On September 13, 2009, at Breaking Point in Montreal, Armstrong was involved in a storyline in which he made a controversial call on the main event match between World Heavyweight Champion CM Punk and The Undertaker. Armstrong called for the bell and declared Punk the winner, even though The Undertaker never actually submitted defeat, thus making a reference to the Montreal Screwjob (which was held in the same venue in 1997). On October 30, 2009, Armstrong faced CM Punk on SmackDown, but lost in a squash match. The next week, Armstrong fast-counted for R-Truth in his match with Punk, costing Punk the match.

On February 26, 2010, Armstrong was initially released from his WWE contract. However a year later, Armstrong reappeared on WWE programming on February 20, 2011, as the referee for the main event during the Elimination Chamber pay-per-view. He officiated The Undertaker vs. Triple H match at WrestleMania XXVII as well as the match between John Cena and CM Punk match for the WWE Championship at Money in the Bank. He returned to SmackDown on August 5, 2011, refereeing the match between The Great Khali and Sheamus. On September 18, 2011, at Night of Champions, Armstrong officiated the main event between Triple H and CM Punk. During a run-in, The Miz and R-Truth verbally abused him, to which Armstrong retaliated by punching The Miz in the face before being beaten down by the two. At TLC: Tables, Ladders and Chairs, Armstrong was Daniel Bryan's referee when he cashed-in his Money in the Bank briefcase and counted the pinfall for Bryan's World Heavyweight Championship victory over Big Show.

In early 2012, Armstrong became a producer for the company. Scott Armstrong also officiated the match between CM Punk and Chris Jericho for the WWE Championship at WrestleMania XXVIII.

On August 19, 2012, at SummerSlam, Armstrong officiated the match between Triple H and Brock Lesnar in which Triple H told him not to stop the match. At Survivor Series, he was accidentally Brogue kicked by Sheamus when he was used as a human shield for World Heavyweight Champion Big Show, causing Big Show to lose via disqualification.

At Night of Champions, Armstrong officiated the WWE Championship match between Daniel Bryan and Randy Orton, and made a fast 3-count in favor of Bryan to allow him to win the championship. He was kayfabe fired the next night for his actions. This was later revealed as a ploy to keep Bryan away from the title. Armstrong made another appearance at Battleground, being the second referee of the Bryan-Orton match after the first referee was knocked out, before himself being knocked out by Big Show. Armstrong returned at the main event of WrestleMania XXX, where he was recruited by The Authority to screw Bryan out of the championship, but was kicked out of the ring by Bryan. At Survivor Series, he was sent by Triple H to replace the knocked out referee, but was struck down by the debuting Sting. Afterwards, he didn't appear on WWE programming until the January 4, 2016, edition of Raw, where he tried to help Sheamus win the WWE World Heavyweight Championship against Roman Reigns while the guest referee, Vince McMahon, was knocked out.

On April 15, 2020, Armstrong was furloughed from the WWE along with several other producers due to the COVID-19 cutbacks, but he returned on October 4. Armstrong was officially released from the WWE on January 5, 2022, ending his 15-year tenure with the company.

== Personal life ==
James is married to Michelle and has two children. In 2008, he helped raise money for The Zoo Northwest Florida (now Gulf Breeze Zoo) after it suffered damage from Hurricane Ivan.

== Championships and accomplishments ==
- Dixieland Championship Wrestling
  - DCW Heavyweight Championship (1 time)
- Georgia Championship Wrestling
  - NWA National Tag Team Championship (1 time) – with Bob Armstrong
- National Wrestling Alliance
  - NWA World Junior Heavyweight Championship (2 times)
- North Georgia Wrestling Association
  - NGWA Tag Team Championship (1 time)
- NWA Wrestle Birmingham
  - NWA Wrestle Birmingham Tag Team Championship (1 time) – with Bob Armstrong
- Peach State Wrestling
  - PSW United States Tag Team Championship (1 time) – with Mad Jack
- Pensacola Wrestling Alliance
  - PWA Heavyweight Championship (1 time)
- Southeastern Championship Wrestling
  - NWA Southeastern Tag Team Championship (1 time) – with Brad Armstrong
  - NWA Southeastern United States Junior Heavyweight Championship (5 times)
- Southeastern Xtreme Wrestling
  - SXW Heavyweight Championship (1 time)
  - SXW Impact Championship (1 time)
- Tennessee Mountain Wrestling
  - TMW Tag Team Championship (1 time) – with Brad Armstrong
- United Championship Wrestling
  - UCW Tag Team Championship (1 time) – with Bob Armstrong
- USA Wrestling
  - USA Junior Heavyweight Championship (2 times)
