= Roadblock (wrestler) =

American professional wrestler (born 1960)

Personal information
- Born: Joseph D'Acquisto; October 30, 1960 (age 65) Rochester, New York, United States

Professional wrestling career
- Ring name(s): Little Joe Nasty; Masked Inferno; Roadblock; The Rochester Roadblock; Torre Infernal; The Wild Thing; Golden Retriever
- Billed height: 6 ft 10 in (208 cm)
- Billed weight: 375 lb (170 kg)
- Billed from: Rochester, New York, United States
- Trained by: Larry Sharpe
- Debut: October 28, 1987
- Retired: 2000

Joseph D'Acquisto (born October 30, 1960) is an American retired professional wrestler. He is best known for his appearances with World Championship Wrestling from 1996 to 1998 under the ring name Roadblock (also spelled Road Block).

== Professional wrestling career ==
=== Early career (1987–1990) ===
D'Acquisto debuted on October 28, 1987. He competed in New England and East Coast independent promotions during the 1980s and 1990s, most notably as a mainstay of International World Class Championship Wrestling, where he wrestled as "The Rochester Roadblock". In 1990, D'Acquisto was the subject of an article by journalist Glen Duffy published in Rolling Stone.

=== Japan and Mexico (1990–1996) ===
In 1990 and 1993 he made some appearances in the World Wrestling Council in Puerto Rico. In 1992, D'Acquisto made several appearances with the Japanese W*ING promotion, where he feuded with Jason the Terrible. He would also wrestle for the Universal Wrestling Association in Mexico, where he competed under the masked gimmick of "Torre Infernal" ("Infernal Tower"). D'Acquisto's final match in the UWA was a mask versus mask match against UWA World Heavyweight Champion El Canek, which Canek would win.

=== World Wrestling Federation (1992) ===
On April 28, 1992, Roadblock wrestled Jim Brunzell in a dark match at a WWF Wrestling Challenge taping in Niagara Falls, NY and was defeated. A day later, Roadblock again wrestled Brunzell at a WWF Superstars taping. Two months later on June 29th, D'Acquisto made a third appearance for the World Wrestling Federation. Now known as "The Golden Retriever" and managed by The Genius Lanny Poffo, he defeated Brian Costello via submission. A day later at a subsequent Wrestling Challenge taping, he was defeated by Jim Powers.

=== World Championship Wrestling (1996–1998) ===
D'Acquisto competed as a preliminary wrestler for World Championship Wrestling (WCW) as "Roadblock". In keeping with his ring name, D'Acquisto would carry a roadblock or a sawhorse to the ring. Roadblock made his televised debut in WCW on the October 19, 1996 episode of Saturday Night by defeating Dale Wolfe, a replacement for D'Acquisto's originally scheduled opponent Randy Savage. After the match, Roadblock challenged Lex Luger to a match to take place two nights later on Monday Nitro, which Acquisto lost. He made his only pay-per-view appearance in WCW at World War 3 on November 24 by participating in the namesake battle royal for a future World Heavyweight Championship opportunity. He was eliminated by the eventual winner The Giant. Roadblock spent the next two years in WCW working mainly on WCW Saturday Night, WCW Pro, and WCW Monday Nitro against the likes of Meng, Chris Benoit, The Giant, Lex Luger, Jim Duggan, and Diamond Dallas Page. Roadblock defeated Jim Powers in his last WCW match on the August 1, 1998 episode of Saturday Night.

=== Late career (1998–2000) ===
After leaving WCW in 1998, Roadblock appeared sporadically on the independent circuit, wrestling his final match in 2000.

== Championships and accomplishments ==
- Eastern States Wrestling
  - Eastern States Heavyweight Championship (1 time)
- Pro Wrestling Illustrated
  - Ranked No. 199 of the 500 top wrestlers of the PWI 500 in 1991

=== Luchas de Apuestas ===
Wager	Winner	Loser	Location	Date
Masks	Mitsuteru Tokuda and Yukihiro Kanemura	Super Invader and Masked Inferno	Tokyo, Japan	August 2, 1992
Mask	El Canek	Torre Infernal	Naucalpan de Juárez, Mexico	November 15, 1992
