= Halloween Havoc (1996) =

World Championship Wrestling pay-per-view event

- VHS cover featuring Macho Man Randy Savage and Hollywood Hogan
- Promotion: World Championship Wrestling
- Date: October 27, 1996
- City: Paradise, Nevada
- Venue: MGM Grand Garden Arena
- Attendance: 10,000
- Buy rate: 250,000
- Tagline: A Night Of Terror And Suspense!

Pay-per-view chronology
← Previous; Fall Brawl	Next → World War 3

Halloween Havoc chronology
← Previous; 1995	Next → 1997

The 1996 Halloween Havoc was the eighth annual Halloween Havoc professional wrestling pay-per-view (PPV) event produced by World Championship Wrestling (WCW). It took place on October 27, 1996, from the MGM Grand Garden Arena in the Las Vegas suburb of Paradise, Nevada.

The event was notable for the first appearance of former World Wrestling Federation (WWF, now WWE) wrestler "Rowdy" Roddy Piper in WCW, who had left the WWF the previous month after he had signed with the company.

== Production ==
=== Background ===
Halloween Havoc was an annual professional wrestling pay-per-view event produced by World Championship Wrestling (WCW) since 1989. As the name implies, it was a Halloween-themed show held in October. The 1996 event was the eighth event in the Halloween Havoc chronology and it took place on October 27, 1996, from the MGM Grand Garden Arena in Las Vegas, Nevada.

=== Storylines ===
The event featured professional wrestling matches that involve different wrestlers from pre-existing scripted feuds and storylines. Professional wrestlers portray villains, heroes, or less distinguishable characters in the scripted events that build tension and culminate in a wrestling match or series of matches.

== Event ==
Other on-screen personnel
Role:	Name:
Commentators	Tony Schiavone
Commentators	Bobby Heenan
Commentators	Dusty Rhodes
Interviewers	Mike Tenay
Interviewers	Lee Marshall
Ring announcer	David Penzer
Referees	Randy Anderson
Referees	Nick Patrick
Referees	Mark Curtis

Prior to the start of the pay-per-view there were two dark matches. The first match saw Jim Powers defeated Pat Tanaka and the second match saw Psychosis and Juventud Guerrera defeated Damián and Halloween.

The opening match of the pay-per-view was for the WCW Cruiserweight Championship. This match saw Dean Malenko defeat Rey Misterio Jr. to capture the championship. Prior to the event, Malenko had stolen Misterio's mask. During the match, Misterio got his original mask back and switched masks. Malenko however was able to hit a gutwrench powerbomb off the top rope for the victory.

The second match saw Diamond Dallas Page defeat Eddie Guerrero via pinfall after hitting the Diamond Cutter.

In the next match, The Giant faced Jeff Jarrett. The Giant came to the ring for the match with the WCW United States Champion, which he had despite never actually winning it. The Giant ultimately won the match by disqualification. As The Giant attempted to chokeslam Jarrett on the floor, Ric Flair hit The Giant with a low blow, forcing the referee to disqualify Jarrett.

The next match saw Syxx defeat Chris Jericho. When Jericho was arguing with referee Nick Patrick about slow counts, Syxx used the opportunity to hit Jericho with a spin kick, and picked up the pinfall victory.

Next Lex Luger defeated Arn Anderson via submission. After Luger hit Anderson in the back with a chair, Luger was able to apply the Torture Rack, to which Anderson submitted. Prior to the next match, it was mentioned that Flair had accompanied Anderson to the local hospital.

In the following match Steve McMichael and Chris Benoit defeated The Faces of Fear (Meng and The Barbarian). After McMichael attacked Meng, Benoit hit the headbutt off the top rope for the pinfall victory.

The second to last match saw The Outsiders (Kevin Nash and Scott Hall) win the WCW World Tag Team Championship by defeating Harlem Heat (Booker T and Stevie Ray). Toward the end of the match, Nash grabbed the cane of Col. Robert Parker, who had accompanied Harlem Heat to the ring, and broke it over the head of Booker T. This gave Hall the opportunity to cover Booker T and pick up the victory and the titles.

The main event saw Hollywood Hogan defeating Randy Savage to retain the WCW World Heavyweight Championship. The Giant chokeslammed Savage to the floor; Giant then dragged an unconscious Hogan onto Savage. During the match, Miss Elizabeth came down to ringside and wasn't sure whose corner to go to. Roddy Piper came out following the match to confront Hogan and make his WCW debut.

== Results ==
No.	Results	Stipulations	Times
1^{D}	Jim Powers defeated Pat Tanaka	Singles match	—
2^{D}	Psychosis and Juventud Guerrera defeated Damián and Halloween	Tag team match	—
3	Dean Malenko defeated Rey Misterio Jr. (c)	Singles match for the WCW Cruiserweight Championship	18:32
4	Diamond Dallas Page defeated Eddie Guerrero	Singles match	13:44
5	The Giant defeated Jeff Jarrett by disqualification	Singles match	09:54
6	Syxx defeated Chris Jericho	Singles match	09:49
7	Lex Luger defeated Arn Anderson by submission	Singles match	12:22
8	Steve McMichael and Chris Benoit (with Woman and Debra) defeated The Faces of Fear (Meng and The Barbarian) (with Jimmy Hart)	Tag team match	09:23
9	The Outsiders (Kevin Nash and Scott Hall) defeated Harlem Heat (Booker T and Stevie Ray) (c) (with Sister Sherri and Col. Robert Parker)	Tag team match for the WCW World Tag Team Championship	13:07
10	Hollywood Hogan (c) defeated Randy Savage	Singles match for the WCW World Heavyweight Championship	18:37
(c) / – the champion(s) heading into the match; D / – this was a dark match
