= Ilio DiPaolo Memorial Show =

The Ilio DiPaolo Memorial Show was an annual professional wrestling event held between 1996 and 1999 as a tribute to wrestler Ilio DiPaolo and featured talent from World Championship Wrestling as well as appearances from older wrestling stars of the "television era". Several of these wrestlers came out of retirement to face their former rivals on the first three shows.

The show was organized by Dennis DiPaolo, along with family and friends of the late Ilio DiPaolo, and the proceeds were generally donated to charitable organizations. The second show, held at the Marine Midland Arena in 1997, was attended by over 16,000 people and raised $70,000 each for the Sick Children's Hospital and the Ilio DiPaulo Scholarship Fund. Jim Kelly, a former quarterback for Buffalo Bills, also received a plaque in recognition for his charity work and was one of several guest celebrities to appear on the show. Although many celebrities were paid for their appearances, wrestlers such as Johnny Barend did not accept payment to perform at the event.

== Show results ==
=== First Annual Ilio DiPaolo Memorial Show ===
June 7, 1996 in Buffalo, New York (Buffalo Memorial Auditorium)

- Introduction: Johnny Barend, Dominic DeNucci, The Destroyer, Mario Fratterali, Woody Johnson, Gene Kiniski, Reginald Love, Angelo Mosca, Tony Parisi, Angelo Poffo, Johnny Powers, Bruno Sammartino, Waldo Von Erich, and Kurt Von Hess.

#	Results	Stipulations	Times
1	Pee Wee Jones pinned Farmer Pete	Singles match	7:54
2	Gino Brito beat The Missing Link via disqualification	Singles match	6:12
3	Dominic DeNucci & Tony Parisi defeated Bruiser Bedlam & Danny Johnson when Parisi pinned Johnson	Tag team match	12:46
4	Diamond Dallas Page pinned Alex Wright	Singles match	9:17
5	Konnan pinned Big Bubba Rogers to retain the WCW United States Championship	Singles match	6:37
6	VK Wallstreet pinned Joe Gomez	Singles match	7:14
7	The Nasty Boys (Brian Knobbs & Jerry Sags) defeated The Public Enemy (Rocco Rock & Johnny Grunge) in a "street fight" match when Knobbs pinned Grunge	Tag team match	9:10
8	Lex Luger pinned Jim Duggan to retain the WCW Television Championship	Singles match	5:15
9	Randy Savage pinned Ric Flair	Singles match	12:05
10	The Giant defeated Sting by disqualification to retain the WCW World Heavyweight Championship	Singles match	7:09

=== Second Annual Ilio DiPaolo Memorial Show ===
June 6, 1997 in Buffalo, New York (Marine Midland Arena)

#	Results	Stipulations	Times
1	Gino Brito & Tony Parisi defeated Dory Funk, Jr. & Greg Valentine by disqualification	Tag team match	n/a
2	Dean Malenko defeated Alex Wright to retain the WCW United States Championship	Singles match	n/a
3	The Steiner Brothers (Rick Steiner & Scott Steiner) defeated The Public Enemy (Rocco Rock & Johnny Grunge)	Tag team match	n/a
4	Diamond Dallas Page defeated Randy Savage	Singles match	n/a
5	Chris Benoit defeated Meng by countout	Singles match	n/a
6	Dean Malenko wrestled Rey Misterio, Jr. to a time-limit draw to retain the WCW United States Championship	Singles match	n/a
7	The Outsiders (Scott Hall & Kevin Nash) defeated Lex Luger & The Giant to retain the WCW World Tag Team Championship	Tag team match	n/a

=== Third Annual Ilio DiPaolo Memorial Show ===
June 11, 1998 in Buffalo, New York (Marine Midland Arena)

- Introduction: Dick Beyer, Gino Brito, Willie Farkas, Billy Red Lyons, Tony Marino, George Scott, Lou Thesz, Angelo Poffo, Waldo Von Erich and Kurt Von Hess.

#	Results	Stipulations	Times
1	Dean Malenko defeated Scotty Riggs by submission to retain the WCW Cruiserweight Championship	Singles match	6:11
2	Juventud Guerrera pinned Billy Kidman	Singles match	7:08
3	Booker T defeated Chris Benoit by disqualification	Singles match	16:41
4	Konnan defeated Scott Putski by submission	Singles match	4:06
5	Saturn pinned Glacier	Singles match	3:42
6	The Giant & The Disciple fought to a no-contest with Randy Savage & Lex Luger	Tag team match	1:11
7	Bill Goldberg pinned Konnan to retain the WCW United States Championship	Singles match	n/a
8	Kevin Nash & Diamond Dallas Page defeated Hollywood Hogan & Bret Hart	Tag team match	n/a

=== Fourth Annual Ilio DiPaolo Memorial Show ===
June 11, 1999 in Buffalo, New York (Marine Midland Arena)

#	Results	Stipulations	Times
1	Jim Duggan defeated The Barbarian	Singles match	n/a
2	La Parka, Psicosis & Damien defeated Silver King, El Dandy & Villano V	Trios match	n/a
3	Konnan defeated Disco Inferno	Singles match	n/a
4	Johnny Swinger defeated Evan Karagias	Singles match	n/a
5	Rey Misterio, Jr. & Billy Kidman defeated Chris Benoit & Dean Malenko	Tag team match	n/a
6	Randy Savage defeated Ric Flair	Singles match	n/a
7	Sting defeated Diamond Dallas Page	Singles match	n/a
