= Theodore Long =

American wrestling manager and former referee

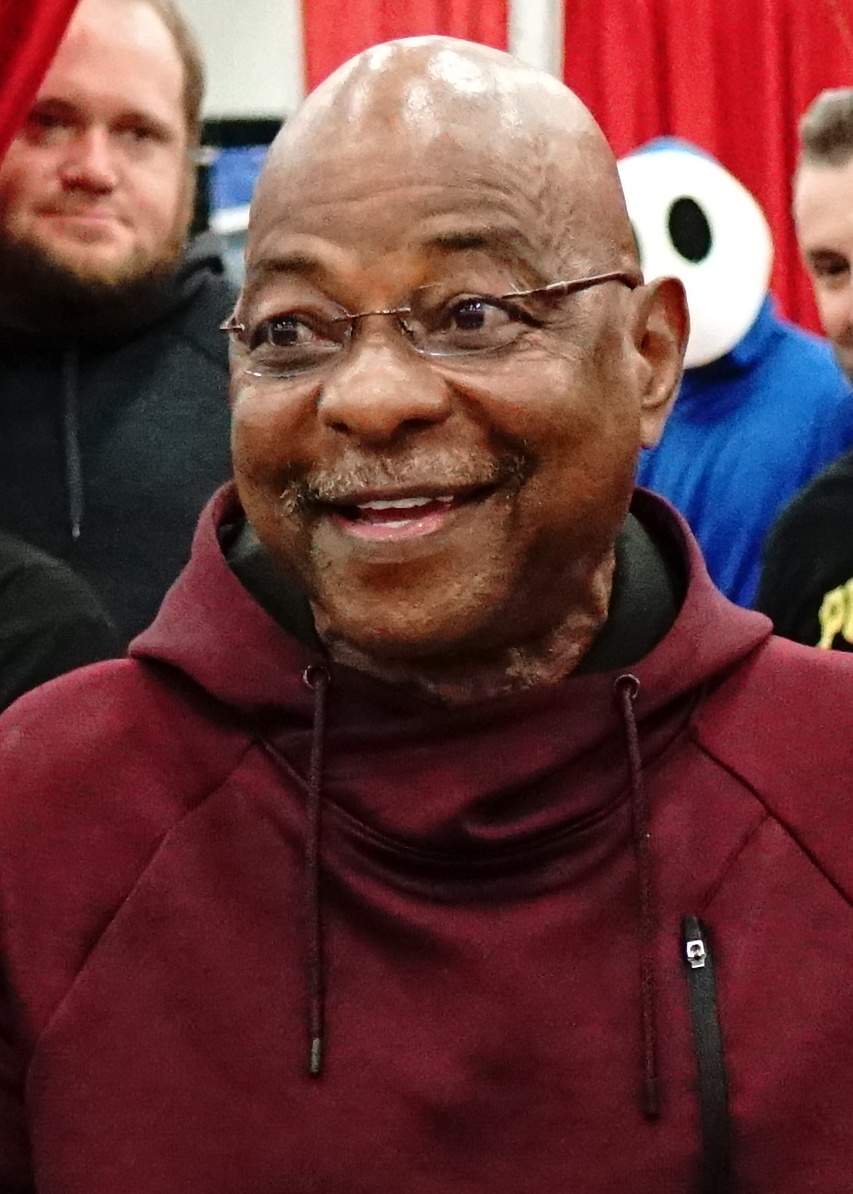
- Long in 2018

Personal information
- Born: Theodore Robert Rufus Long; September 15, 1947 (age 79) Birmingham, Alabama, U.S.
- Spouse: Tasha Long (m. 1982; died 2022)
- Children: 1

Professional wrestling career
- Ring name(s): Teddy Long; Theodore Long; Theodore R. Long
- Billed height: 5 ft 8 in (1.73 m)
- Billed weight: 173 lb (78 kg)
- Billed from: Atlanta, Georgia
- Debut: 1985

Theodore Robert Rufus Long (born September 15, 1947) is an American retired professional wrestling referee, manager and authority figure. He is best known for his tenures in WWE, WCW and NWA.

Long began his career in the National Wrestling Alliance and made his WWE (then the World Wrestling Federation) debut in 1998 as a referee. He transitioned to be an on-screen manager in 2003 and later served as General Manager of SmackDown for two tenures lasting a combined six years as well as a one-year stint as ECW General Manager.

In 2017, he was inducted into the WWE Hall of Fame by Ron Simmons and John Layfield.

== Professional wrestling career ==
=== Jim Crockett Promotions/World Championship Wrestling (1985–1996) ===
Long started out as an errand boy for wrestlers Tommy Rich and Abdullah the Butcher. He eventually became a member of the ringcrew and was promoted to referee in the NWA's Jim Crockett Promotions in 1985 as Teddy Long. In 1989, at the Chi-Town Rumble event, Long was the replacement referee when Ricky Steamboat won the NWA World Heavyweight Championship.

Shortly thereafter, Long began to turn into a villainous character when he started to bend the rules for heel wrestlers. On April 2, 1989, at Clash of the Champions VI in New Orleans, Long blatantly made a fast count allowing Mike Rotunda and "Dr. Death" Steve Williams to defeat the Road Warriors for the NWA World Tag Team Championship. After this match, the National Wrestling Alliance relieved Long of his refereeing duties. This was actually a story lifted from Championship Wrestling from Florida, where Long had been a referee and did several heel-decisions in the ring, including one for Ron Simmons over Skip Young.

Long got his head shaved bald after losing a Hair vs Hair match to Paul Ellering at Capital Combat PPV.

While riding with Kevin Sullivan and Eddie Gilbert, Long would DJ for them. After hearing Long talk, the two convinced Jim Ross to give Long a managerial role, managing Norman the Lunatic. Long's first clients were The Skyscrapers (Sid Vicious, Dan Spivey and "Mean" Mark Callous) who feuded with The Road Warriors. Long then replaced Woman as the manager of Doom (Ron Simmons and Butch Reed) and led them to the World Tag Team Titles. After Doom split up, He became the manager of Johnny B. Badd but abandoned him after Badd turned face, Long also managed One Man Gang and Norman the Lunatic.

In 1993, Long turned face and became the manager of 2 Cold Scorpio and Marcus Bagwell after they formed a tag team. Long and Scorpio were released from WCW in April 1994.

In late 1995, Long returned to WCW again as a babyface. His first client was Sgt. Craig Pittman who had just turned face. Long was then paired with low card wrestlers such as Joey Maggs, Jim Powers and Ice Train. In fall 1996, Long then began a feud with Nick Patrick because it was rumored that Patrick was joining the nWo and Patrick began doing exactly what Long was doing in the late-1980s when Long was a referee. Long then recruited Chris Jericho to face Patrick in a One arm tied behind my back match at World War 3 in which Jericho won. Long was released by WCW in September 1997.

=== World Wrestling Federation/Entertainment/WWE ===
==== Referee and manager (1998–2004) ====
After a year and a half away from TV, Long debuted in the WWF as a referee on the December 21, 1998 episode of Raw is War. Long went by the shortened Teddy Long name during this period. He was a referee at the Over The Edge 1999 PPV, during the match after Owen Hart's death: a mixed tag match between Jeff Jarrett/Debra and Val Venis/Nicole Bass. Long was the referee when Darren Drozdov ended up paralyzed and can be seen in WWE's Don't Try This At Home warning looking at the paramedics lift Droz up on a stretcher. He wrestled in a 3 on 2 handicap match with The Rock and Jack Doan defeating Kane and Rikishi on Monday Night Raw on January 8, 2001.

By late 2002, Vince McMahon wanted Long to become a heel manager like he was in NWA and WCW and decided to take Long off of television and the road for a while and by late summer 2003, He returned under his full name, and perhaps his most notable managing stint in this period came when managing D'Lo Brown, Rodney Mack, Christopher Nowinski, Rosey, Mark Henry and Jazz at different times, telling fans to "Get down wit' da Brown" and to "Back da Mack". Long teamed with Mack and Nowiniski, losing to The Dudley Boyz at Insurrextion (2003). When he was drafted to SmackDown!, he managed Mark Jindrak. On the January 5, 2004 edition of Raw, he was filling in as the guest General Manager for Eric Bischoff. During a match between Mark Henry and Rob Van Dam, announcer Lilian Garcia had announced that Van Dam had won by DQ in a No Disqualification Match, but Long grabbed the microphone and ordered to restart the match. Just then, Stone Cold Steve Austin, as the "Sheriff", came out with an ATV and chased him around the ring and the arena. After Van Dam won the match, Austin continued to chase Long until he was cornered by both him and Van Dam; in which they pushed Long back into the ring. As he begged Austin not to hurt him, Long offered him a handshake. He accepted it, only to give Long a stunner in the process for restarting the match.

==== General manager of SmackDown and ECW (2004–2012) ====
After Kurt Angle was fired from the general manager position in July 2004, Long became the new and first African-American general manager of SmackDown!. Long immediately turned face on his first night as general manager when he fined Angle $1,000 for not having his wrestling gear with him. Because of his face turn, his new position saw him giving the fans what they wanted and making matches that put heels at disadvantages, notably John "Bradshaw" Layfield (JBL), a stark contrast to other WWE managers, such as Eric Bischoff and Mr. McMahon, who would blatantly favor heels. At first, he continued to use the "Hater-ade" catch phrase he started using as a bad guy, but less aggressively, and with more humor in it. Long would also introduce the New Talent Initiative during this time, which saw the likes of Bobby Lashley and Mr. Kennedy debut in 2005 and Montel Vontavious Porter in 2006, among others.

As part of the SmackDown! vs. Raw feud, Long defeated Raw General Manager Eric Bischoff at Survivor Series with the help of The Boogeyman.

Long had problems with Booker T and his defense of the United States Championship, however, as Booker T attempted to get out of title defenses on a number of occasions by pretending to be injured, and having other wrestlers fight on his behalf. Eventually, Long got tired of these shenanigans, and at No Way Out, Booker T was told to face Chris Benoit or be stripped of the title. Benoit won the match and was congratulated by Long.

After Randy Orton had cheated to obtain Rey Mysterio's title shot at WrestleMania 22, Long placed Mysterio back in the match and made it a Triple Threat match, at the same time warning Orton that he could still remove Orton from the match if he disobeyed Long.

At Judgment Day Long fired Melina and Johnny Nitro from SmackDown!. On the following SmackDown!, JBL suffered the same fate after losing the United States Championship to Bobby Lashley, and then losing a World Heavyweight Championship match to Rey Mysterio in his Judgment Day rematch.

On the September 4, 2006 episode of Raw, Long appeared to a tremendous ovation in his hometown of Atlanta. During a six-person, intergender tag match between Randy Orton, Edge, and Lita against Trish Stratus, Carlito, and John Cena, some fans chanted Theodore's name.

In April 2007, Long became the on-screen boyfriend of Kristal Marshall, after weeks flirting with each other backstage. Long then began to look for an assistant so he could spend more time with Kristal, eventually revealing Vickie Guerrero as his new assistant on May 25, 2007, an appointment made partly at Kristal's request. On the June 22 episode of SmackDown!, Long asked Kristal to marry him. Kristal ran out of the ring, crying, but later agreed to marry him. At Vengeance: Night of Champions, Long appeared after Edge lost a Last Chance match for the World Heavyweight Championship against Batista via disqualification as a result of a low blow and restarted the match, with the disqualification and countout rule waived. On the July 27 episode of SmackDown!, Ron Simmons was named the best man for "Theodore Rufus Long" and Kristal's wedding on the September 21 episode of SmackDown! emanating from Long's hometown of Atlanta, Georgia. The wedding was not completed, however, due to constant disruptions and Long having a heart attack just as he started to say "I do". He then fell into a coma. The storyline never finished out as planned as Marshall left the WWE shortly afterwards due to creative differences. Long returned on the November 30 episode of SmackDown! as the assistant general manager and made a match at Armageddon for the World Heavyweight Championship. He started to feud with Guerrero over her position as the general manager as she continued to favor Edge. On the May 16, 2008 episode of SmackDown, Long quit his role of assistant general manager.

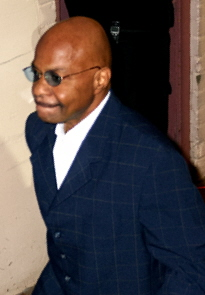
Theodore Long on his way to the ring

On the June 3 episode of ECW, it was announced that Long had become the new general manager of the ECW brand by order of the WWE board of directors. Long continued the New Talent Initiative, with a name-change to the New Superstar Initiative, which would see the debuts of Sheamus, Jack Swagger, Kofi Kingston, Evan Bourne, Tyler Reks, Trent Baretta, Caylen Croft, DJ Gabriel, Ricky Ortiz, Gavin Spears, Braden Walker and ECW referee Aaron Davis.

On the April 7, 2009 episode of ECW, Long announced he was returning to SmackDown as general manager, with Tiffany replacing him on ECW. By doing this, he became the first person in the history of the company to have a second term as general manager. He made his official return to SmackDown on April 10, when he announced that the Hardys (Matt and Jeff) would face each other in the first-ever stretcher match in SmackDown history.

At the Breaking Point PPV, Long restarted the World Heavyweight Championship match between CM Punk and The Undertaker after The Undertaker made Punk submit using his Hell's Gate submission finisher, stating that the ban on the maneuver was still in effect. On the September 18 episode of SmackDown, WWE chairman Mr. McMahon instructed Long to go down to the ring and explain his actions regarding the conclusion of the World Heavyweight Championship Submission match between champion CM Punk and The Undertaker in which Long, as well as referee Scott Armstrong and CM Punk played key roles in recreating the infamous Montreal Screwjob at Breaking Point (held at the Bell Centre in Montreal, Quebec, Canada, site of the 1997 fiasco), this time, with The Undertaker being the target of a planned conspiracy. As he returned from the ring to the back stage area, he entered his waiting limousine only to be kidnapped by The Undertaker, who was in the driver's seat. The following week on SmackDown Long was brought into the arena inside a coffin by The Undertaker's druids where he again legalized The Undertaker's Hell's Gate submission hold. Long made a guest appearance on the February 8, 2010 episode of Raw, in which Shawn Michaels performed his finishing maneuver Sweet Chin Music on Long after Long refused to draft Michaels to SmackDown. He then began a feud with Drew McIntyre, the first part of which revolved around McIntyre qualifying for the Money in the Bank ladder match at WrestleMania XXVI, which was instead won by Jack Swagger. On the May 7 episode of SmackDown, after McIntyre brutally assaulted Matt Hardy, Long stripped McIntyre of his Intercontinental Championship and fired him. As a result, the Intercontinental Championship was vacant. Thus, Long issued the Intercontinental Championship tournament involving Christian, Kofi Kingston, Cody Rhodes and Dolph Ziggler. However, after Kingston emerged victorious against Christian, Long was issued a letter from Vince McMahon reinstating McIntyre and forcing Kingston to give his title back to McIntyre. He then made a match for McIntyre's Intercontinental Championship at Over the Limit against Kofi Kingston.

On the May 28 episode of SmackDown, Long read a letter from Mr. McMahon's office given to him by Drew McIntyre which stated that Matt Hardy was suspended until further notice after Hardy attacked McIntyre at Over the Limit and told Hardy not to go near McIntyre and if he did so, Long would be fired as the general manager of SmackDown.

On the June 11 episode of SmackDown, a frustrated McIntyre announced a match between Long and McIntyre would take place the following week on SmackDown per orders of McMahon. McIntyre said if Long didn't compete, he would be fired. McIntyre then went on to win the match the following week, after it was ordered that Long had get down on his knees, proclaim Drew as "The Chosen One" and then lay on his back and let McIntyre pin him without a fight. On the June 25 episode of SmackDown, Long reinstated Hardy and made McIntyre compete against the returning Hardy. Hardy would win the match, but after the match, Long came out and told McIntyre that his work visa had expired, and made security carry him out of the arena. On the July 9 edition of SmackDown, McIntyre was reinstated and pleaded forgiveness from Long, even going so far as to nominate Long as a member of the WWE Hall of Fame as well as get on his knees and proclaim Long "the best boss he ever had." Long, however, did not believe him and announced a Money in the Bank qualifying match (for the upcoming Money in the Bank pay-per-view) against Kofi Kingston.

On the January 21, 2011 episode of SmackDown, Long was found (kayfabe) unconscious in his office, suffering a head injury. He returned on the February 18 episode of SmackDown, where he revealed Vickie Guerrero and Dolph Ziggler to have attacked him. He then scheduled a match between the new World Heavyweight Champion Ziggler and Edge. Edge would win the match, becoming an eleven-time world champion. After the match, Long would then fire Ziggler. The following week, he fired Guerrero after she lost a mixed tag team match.

On the May 6 episode of SmackDown, Long scheduled a World Heavyweight Championship match between Randy Orton and Christian who had just won it for the first time five nights prior at Extreme Rules. On the June 3 episode of SmackDown, Christian was chosen by Long as the special guest referee for a World Heavyweight Championship match between Orton and Sheamus who beat Christian and Mark Henry in a triple threat number one contender's match for the title the week before. Christian would turn heel by hitting Orton with the title he had retained, and lost to Orton again at Capitol Punishment despite his foot being under the bottom rope. Christian blamed Long and as a result Long scheduled Orton to defend his title against Christian at Money in the Bank. Christian would manage to find a way to include a clause that if Orton were to get disqualified, the title would switch hands.

On the July 29 episode of SmackDown the new COO Triple H made Zack Ryder Theodore Long's new Assistant.

On the November 25, 2011 episode of SmackDown, after Daniel Bryan seemingly successfully cashed in the SmackDown Money in the Bank briefcase on Mark Henry to win his first World Heavyweight Championship, Long rushed down to the ring and declared the title change void, as Mark Henry had not yet been medically cleared to compete in an official match. He would schedule Bryan in a fatal four-way match against Randy Orton, Cody Rhodes and Wade Barrett to determine the number one contender for Henry's title which would be defended on the November 29 episode of SmackDown in a steel cage match.

After TLC: Tables, Ladders, and Chairs, Santino Marella replaced Zack Ryder (who had just won his first United States Championship) as the assistant SmackDown general manager.

==== Feud with John Laurinaitis and Eve Torres and becoming senior adviser (2012–2014) ====
On February 21, 2012, Long was criticized by Interim Raw General Manager John Laurinaitis, which prompted the WWE board of directors to switch the general managers of their respective shows for one week. Long took charge of the March 5 episode of Raw, with Laurinaitis taking charge of the March 9 edition of SmackDown. During Laurinaitis' time in charge of SmackDown, he set up a match between himself and Long, where, if Long lost, Aksana, Long's girlfriend, would be placed in a match with Kane. Long won the match when Randy Orton attacked Kane at ringside, which distracted Laurinaitis. The Aksana-Kane match never took place.

A 12-man Tag Team match was then set up at WrestleMania XXVIII, where six superstars would represent both general managers. Long chose Santino Marella as his team captain, along with Kofi Kingston, R-Truth, Zack Ryder, The Great Khali and Booker T over the following weeks. A stipulation was added that the winning team at WrestleMania would determine who would become the general manager of both shows. At WrestleMania, Team Teddy lost to Team Johnny, ending Long's run as SmackDown General Manager.

On the April 6 edition of SmackDown, Long prepared to give his farewell speech, but Laurinaitis threatened to discontinue a trust fund Long had set up for his grandchildren's college education unless he took a job as his new assistant, to which Long reluctantly accepted.

Laurinaitis hired the evil Eve Torres to be his Executive Administrator, and informed Long that he would now be working under Eve and would report to her. As Eve's subordinate, the next few weeks were hell for Long. Eve found the role to be a power trip and enjoyed abusing her position by bullying and humiliating Long on numerous occasions. She took great pleasure in humiliating him by forcing him to do menial, degrading tasks; such as making him wear an apron and name tag at all times, like a maid. As well as stand guard by a door dressed as a Queen's soldier. She also enjoyed ordering him to get her coffee, and would throw the coffee all over him if it wasn't to her satisfaction. Long was also forced by Eve to rub oil on Antonio Cesaro for a photoshoot, this was particularly humiliating for Long as it was in front of his ex love interest (and Cesaro's girlfriend) Aksana, who seemed to find Long's predicament extremely entertaining.

At Extreme Rules, he was criticized for spinning a wheel to determine what match Cody Rhodes and Big Show would face off in by making it a tables match. At Over the Limit he mocked David Otunga and Eve Torres ahead of Laurinaitis' bout with John Cena which if he lost he would be fired. This further angered Laurinaitis who defeated Cena to keep his job with help from Big Show. At No Way Out, Laurinaitis was fired, and Long enjoyed watching him being attacked by John Cena the following night on Raw.

After Laurinaitis' firing as general manager, Long served as guest general manager for both Raw and SmackDown on July 2 and July 3 respectively. On the August 3 edition of SmackDown, Long was made the senior advisor to new SmackDown General Manager Booker T. Despite originally getting along with Booker T very well, beginning in March 2013, Booker T began to get angry at Long for booking matches without his permission on both Raw and SmackDown. However, from mid April onwards, Long began running SmackDown again temporarily with Booker T away due to surgery. On the July 19 episode of SmackDown, after the returning Booker T and Raw General Manager Brad Maddox had an argument on who was to be SmackDown General Manager, Mr. McMahon came out to say Vickie Guerrero was named SmackDown's new general manager. After a backstage segment, with Guerrero, Long was escorted out by a security team. This marked his last appearance as a major authoritative figure.

On June 12, 2014, after nearly a year of inactivity, Long was released from WWE along with ten other contracts, ending his long tenure with the company.

==== Hall of Fame and sporadic appearances (2014–present) ====
On October 10 for the 15th Anniversary of SmackDown, Long made a surprise appearance; getting into an argument with John Laurinaitis. This led to a 16-man Tag Team match, in which Team Teddy (Sheamus, Mark Henry, Jack Swagger, The Usos, Los Matadores and El Torito) defeated Team Johnny (Cesaro, Gold and Stardust, Bo Dallas, Damien Mizdow, Heath Slater, Titus O'Neil and Hornswoggle).

After the announcement of the restored WWE brand extension, on the June 6, 2016 episode of Raw, Long returned in the opening segment between the Money in the Bank participants, requesting another run as general manager of SmackDown, only to be turned away by Stephanie McMahon. He would make several other appearances throughout the course of the night including his attempt of making a tag team match between The Golden Truth (Goldust and R-Truth) and Breezango (Tyler Breeze and Fandango) before being escorted out of the building by security.

On February 13, 2017, it was announced that he would be inducted in the 2017 WWE Hall of Fame. On the April 3, 2017 episode of Raw, Long made an appearance, thinking that Mr. McMahon would appoint him to be the new general manager of Raw, but McMahon said that it was not him; instead, Vince chose Kurt Angle, another 2017 WWE Hall of Fame inductee, as general manager. On January 22, 2018, Long made a brief backstage appearance during Raw 25 Years.

Long also made an appearance on the January 4, 2021 episode of Raw under the Raw Legends Night special wherein he announced that he booked The Miz and John Morrison in a tag-team match against The New Day, in which the latter won, He also appeared on the special throwback episode of SmackDown on May 7, 2021.

On January 23, 2023, Long appeared on Raw is XXX, celebrating the 30th anniversary of Monday Night Raw, where he booked a six-man tag match between Seth Rollins with The Street Profits (Angelo Dawkins and Montez Ford) and Imperium (Gunther, Ludwig Kaiser and Giovanni Vinci), after Imperium disrespected D-Generation X.

On April 26, 2024, Long was seen as part of SmackDown backstage team during the 2024 WWE Draft.

=== Independent circuit (2014–present) ===
In 2014, Booker T had announced that Long would serve as the general manager for his Reality of Wrestling promotion's Summer of Champions iPPV.

Teddy Long acted as the general manager for SWE Fury, a nationally televised wrestling promotion based in Plano, Texas. Long left the company in August 2021.

From 2021 to present, Long has worked as commissioner for Alabama Independent promotions Main Event Wrestling and Independent Wrestling Network.

== Filmography ==
=== Web series ===
Year	Title	Role	Notes
2013	The Mugshot Madness	Himself	main cast

== Personal life ==
Long was married to his wife Tasha Long for forty years. They remained married until her death in September 2022.

On July 7, 2025, his son Antione Long died.

== Awards and accomplishments ==
- Combat Sport Pro
  - Hall of Fame (Class of 2015)
- National Wrestling Alliance
  - NWA Hall of Fame (Class of 2012)
- Pro Wrestling Illustrated
  - Manager of the Year (1990)
- Wrestling Observer Newsletter
  - Worst Worked Match of the Year (2005) vs. Eric Bischoff at Survivor Series
- WWE
  - WWE Hall of Fame (Class of 2017)
