= Kenny Kaos =

American former professional wrestler (born 1970)

Personal information
- Born: Kenneth M. Stasiowski; June 18, 1970 (age 56) Anchorage, Alaska

Professional wrestling career
- Ring name(s): Kenny Shaw; Kenny Kaos; Kaos
- Billed height: 6 ft 0 in (1.83 m)
- Billed weight: 250 lb (110 kg)
- Billed from: Anchorage, Alaska
- Trained by: Sgt. Buddy Lee Parker; WCW Power Plant
- Debut: 1995
- Retired: 1999

Kenneth M. Stasiowski (born June 18, 1970) is an American former professional wrestler. He is best known for his stint with World Championship Wrestling, where he performed under the ring name Kenny Kaos and wrestled as a part of the tag team High Voltage with partner Robbie Rage. During his stint in WCW, Stasiowski became a one time World Tag Team Champion with Rick Steiner.

== Professional wrestling career ==
=== World Championship Wrestling ===
==== High Voltage (1996–1998) ====
After making his professional wrestling debut in 1995, Stasiowski was signed to a contract by World Championship Wrestling in 1996. He made his WCW debut on the March 2, 1996 episode of WCW Saturday Night under the ring name Kenny Shaw, where he and The Shadow lost to Loch Ness in a handicap match. Following this, Stasiowski started training in the WCW Power Plant, WCW's training facility, where he formed a tag team alongside Robert Knapik. Now renamed to Kenny Kaos and Robbie Rage respectively, the team was named High Voltage and made their debut at the April 27 house show in a losing effort to the State Patrol (Sgt. Buddy Lee Parker and Lt. James Earl Wright). High Voltage then made their televised debut on the June 3 episode of WCW Monday Nitro in a losing effort to The Faces of Fear (The Barbarian and Meng). Kaos made his Pay-per-view debut at World War 3, where he took part in the three ring, 60 man battle royal with the winner earning a title match for the WCW World Heavyweight Championship, but was unsuccessful. Their team had competed against several popular tag teams in WCW, such as Harlem Heat (Booker T and Stevie Ray), Vicious and Delicious (Scott Norton and Buff Bagwell), the Faces of Fear, The Steiner Brothers (Rick and Scott) and makeshift cruiserweight teams. Despite this, High Voltage remained under-carders and competed on WCW's secondary shows WCW Saturday Night, WCW Pro and WCW WorldWide and remained jobbers for most of their tenure.

High Voltage appeared in New Japan Pro-Wrestling between November 1997 and February 1998 with Kaos representing in the Super Grade Tag League.

High Voltage wrestled their final match on the September 5 house show, where they defeated the Dancing Fools (Disco Inferno and Alex Wright). High Voltage subsequently split due to Rage suffering an injury.

==== World Tag Team Champion and retirement (1998–1999) ====
After High Voltage split, Kaos wrestled his first match as a singles wrestler in a losing effort to Ernest "The Cat" Miller on the September 7, 1998 episode of WCW Monday Nitro. Kaos then proceeded to perform as an under-card face before receiving a push beginning on the October 26, 1998 episode of WCW Monday Nitro. After losing to Stevie Ray, Kaos was assaulted by Ray and Buff Bagwell before being saved by Rick Steiner. As Steiner defeated The Giant and Scott Steiner in a handicap match to win the WCW World Tag Team Championship for himself at Halloween Havoc the night before and needed a tag team partner in order to defend the title, Steiner chose Kaos as his partner, giving him the first and only championship of his career. Later that night, Kaos and Steiner defeated Ray and The Giant to retain the title in their first defense. On the November 12 episode of Thunder, Kaos picked up his first victory as a singles competitor by defeating Kendall Windham. While still World Tag Team Champion, Kaos challenged Konnan for his WCW World Television Championship on the December 17 episode of WCW Thunder, but was unable to win the title. Following the match, Robbie Rage returned from injury and demanded to know why Kaos won the title with Steiner instead of himself. On the December 21 episode of Nitro, Kaos lost to Lex Luger after a distraction from Rage, who once again confronted Kaos over High Voltage's split. However, before the angle could develop any further, Rage was released from his contract during his recovery from a previous injury. Following this, Steiner and Kaos were forced to vacate the World Tag Team Championship in January 1999 due to Steiner suffering an injury.

On the January 9, 1999 episode of Saturday Night, Kaos and new tag team partner Bobby Eaton defeated La Parka and Silver King in the first round of a tournament to crown the new World Tag Team Champions. On the January 16 episode of Saturday Night, Kaos and Eaton were eliminated from the tournament by Bobby Duncum, Jr. and Mike Enos. Following this, Kaos became a singles competitor and found mixed success over the next few months. On the August 30 episode of Nitro, Kaos teamed with Prince Iaukea and wrestled against the West Texas Rednecks (Barry Windham and Kendall Windham) for the World Tag Team Championship, but they were unsuccessful in defeating the Rednecks for the title.

After a three-month absence from television, Kaos returned on the November 18 episode of Thunder and lost to Lash LeRoux in what turned out to be his final match. Stasiowski was let go due to budget cuts and retired from professional wrestling shortly after.

== Other media ==
The only video game Kaos appeared in was WCW Mayhem released in September 1999.

== Championships and accomplishments ==
- Pro Wrestling Illustrated
  - PWI ranked him No. 195 of the top 500 singles wrestlers in the PWI 500 in 1998
- World Championship Wrestling
  - WCW World Tag Team Championship (1 time) – with Rick Steiner
