= Jim Powers =

American professional wrestler (born 1958)

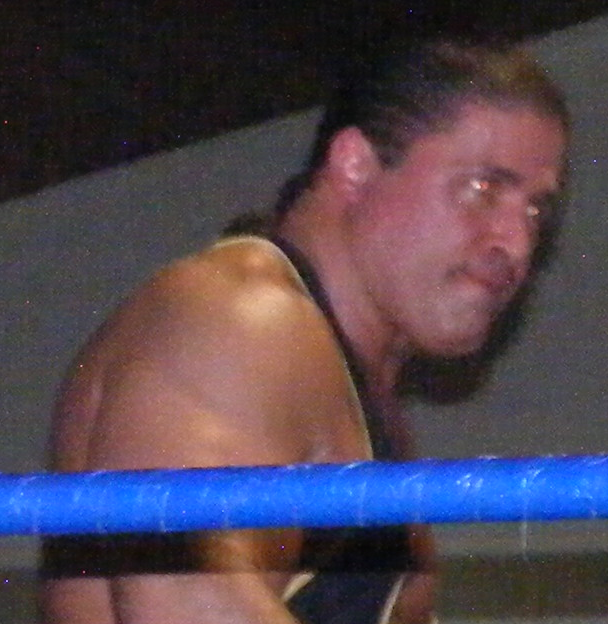
- Powers in 2008

Personal information
- Born: James Manley; January 4, 1958 (age 68) East Rutherford, New Jersey, U.S.

Professional wrestling career
- Ring name(s): James Manley; Jim Powers
- Billed height: 6 ft 1 in (185 cm)
- Billed weight: 235 lb (107 kg)
- Billed from: New York City
- Trained by: Big John Studd
- Debut: 1984
- Retired: 2010

James Manley (born January 4, 1958) is an American retired professional wrestler, better known by the ring name Jim Powers. He worked for the World Wrestling Federation from 1984 to 1994, then elsewhere until 2010. He was born in Washington Heights, Manhattan, and grew up watching the then-regional promotion at Madison Square Garden.

== Professional wrestling career ==
=== World Wrestling Federation (1984–1985) ===
Powers was discovered and brought into the World Wrestling Federation (WWF) in late 1984 by Big John Studd who also had a hand in training him. He made his WWF debut on October 2, 1984, losing to Carl Fury at a house show in Lindenhurst, New York. He then made his televised debut on the December 8, 1984, edition of Georgia Championship Wrestling, teaming with Jose Luis Rivera in a match against Nikolai Volkoff and The Iron Sheik. He went on to lose to The Moondogs, The Spoiler, and Bob Orton Jr. He gained his first victory when he pinned Gino Carabello at a house show in the Bronx, New York, on December 5, 1984. That was his sole victory of the year, as the young rookie continued to register losses on television, falling to Ken Patera, the tandem of Patera and Big John Studd, and Brutus Beefcake.

=== World Class Championship Wrestling (1985) ===
In July 1985, Powers ventured outside the WWF to gain more experience, including two Texas based promotions: Texas All-Star Wrestling and World Class Championship Wrestling where he appeared at a couple of the federation's featured "Star Wars" events. After gaining more experience, Powers returned to the WWF.

=== World Wrestling Federation (1985–1994) ===
While still working for World Class, Powers made a one off return at a house show in Wildwood, NJ on August 3, 1985, facing Jim Neidhart. He formally jumped back to the promotion on September 9, 1985, teaming with S. D. Jones in a losing effort to The Bobby Heenan Family (Big John Studd & King Kong Bundy) in a match that aired on Championship Wrestling on October 5. Powers would wrestle almost exclusively on television tapings for the remainder of the year, facing Adrian Adonis, Gino Carabello, The Hart Foundation, The Dream Team, and others in losing efforts.

Powers gained his first victory in his return on March 1, 1986 when he defeated Barry O on Prime Time Wrestling in Baltimore, MD. Later in the year he began to appear more on house shows, and defeated Terry Gibbs at an event in Queens, NY on June 7, 1986. Five days later he wrestled three times on another house show in Sunbury, PA, defeating Rene Goulet and AJ Petrucci and also participating in a nine man battle royal. However for the still learning wrestler these were the highlights of the year, as he continued to drop more prominent matches to roster members such as Sika.

==== The Young Stallions (1987–1989) ====
He arguably reached the peak of his career in the WWF when Powers, on March 11, 1987, along with another preliminary wrestler Paul Roma, formed a tag team called The Young Stallions. At first the team had no name, and the original pairing saw Roma and Powers teamed with Tito Santana in a six-man tag team match against the team of Don Muraco, Bob Orton, Jr., and Tiger Chung Lee on Wrestling Challenge. Powers, Roma, and Santana won when Santana pinned Lee, after Muraco and Orton walked away from the match. Following the win, the team lost twice to Demolition, as well as an eight-man tag team match against members of The Heenan Family in June 1987.

Powers and Roma finally gained their first televised victory in regular tag team action in late July 1987 when they faced another preliminary team, Barry Horowitz and Steve Lombardi. The team was dominant and announcer Bobby Heenan was stunned when Roma unleashed an off the top rope sunset flip. Fresh off of their first win, Powers and Roma were scheduled to face The Hart Foundation on an August 8, 1987, episode of Superstars (taped August 4), they scored an upset disqualification victory over WWF Tag Team Champions The Hart Foundation. The team received their name by accident when color commentator Bruno Sammartino referred to them once as "a couple of young stallions" thus naming the team.

In October 1987 the Young Stallions became the official moniker of the Powers and Roma tag team. A storyline playing off of their upset win over the Hart Foundation was started as they "stole" the theme song "Crank It Up" from Jimmy Hart, who had intended to use it for his team. Later that month they faced The Hart Foundation in a rematch on Saturday Night's Main Event XII. The Stallions were narrowly defeated and now clearly had momentum. Along with The Killer Bees, they were also the only survivors in the elimination tag team match at the first annual Survivor Series pay-per-view on November 26, 1987.

On December 26, 1987, the Stallions were scheduled to face The Hart Foundation in Buffalo, New York. Neidhart did not appear at the event, and the match was then switched to a singles match between Powers and Bret "Hitman" Hart. That night Powers scored perhaps the greatest upset of his career to date when he pinned the future WWF World Champion. Following the match, Hart complained that the loss was a fluke and volunteered to take on Paul Roma. Another match followed, and Roma also pinned Hart.

That momentum seemed to end in January 1988 when the Stallions faced The Islanders in a best two out of three falls match in the final bout of the inaugural Royal Rumble. Powers and Roma were defeated cleanly in two straight falls. The team was placed in featured matches on television and at house shows, but most times ended up on the losing end to teams such as The Bolsheviks, The Brain Busters, and The Fabulous Rougeaus. Following yet another loss, they started teaming less frequently. Their final televised match was a loss to The Powers of Pain in July 1989.

Soon, the Young Stallions were split up off camera without an official announcement. Roma and Powers went their separate ways and both floundered on the undercard afterward, with Powers sustaining an injury that forced him out of action until March 1990. Roma and Powers feuded for a while during this period, but this soon was scrapped, and they both returned to competing in singles matches.

==== Singles competition (1989–1994) ====
As Roma began teaming with Hercules to form the team of Power and Glory that spring, Powers began to occasionally partner with Jim Brunzell. Powers had an opportunity to face his former partner in the August 6, 1990, episode of Prime Time Wrestling when Power and Glory defeated Powers and Brunzell. On house shows, Roma faced off against Powers in singles competition multiple times during that month as well, with Roma coming out victorious at every outcome.

For the next four years Powers was featured primarily as a singles wrestler. During this time, he most notably became the first WWF wrestler to lose to Ric Flair when the "Nature Boy" made his Federation debut on the September 30, 1991, episode of Prime Time Wrestling. While sustaining televised losses to top stars like Mr. Perfect, Ted DiBiase, The Undertaker, Powers also defeated Al Perez, Steve Lombardi, and The Predator. In 1991, Powers teamed with a variety of partners, with such wrestlers as Marty Jannetty, and Owen Hart, in both house Shows, and televised shows. Probably his peak push came in June 1992, when he returned after a several month hiatus from television to pin Lombardi and Bob Bradley. He followed this up with numerous house show victories, and closed 1992 with a Wrestling Challenge victory against Brian Lee in October.

From this point on, he was unable to move up the card, although he narrowly lost to Jerry Lawler in April 1993 on WWF Monday Night Raw and defeated Repo Man on house shows. Powers also defeated The Tazmaniac on a house show on June 30, 1993, in Atlantic City, New Jersey. He ended 1993 with a victory over Papa Shango at a house show on July 23 in Syracuse New York. After a five-month hiatus he returned to the roster, wrestling primarily on house shows against Rick Martel and Kwang. His final television appearances came in July 1994, when he faced Owen Hart and Jeff Jarrett on WWF Superstars and Wrestling Challenge. Powers ended his WWF career on a winning streak, defeating Abe Schwartz at Madison Square Garden on October 29 and again in Scranton, Pennsylvania the following night. He then departed, a full decade after first signing with the company.

=== Extreme Championship Wrestling (1994, 1995) ===
On the November 22, 1994, episode of ECW Hardcore TV (taped less than a week after his final WWF match), Powers unsuccessfully challenged ECW World Heavyweight Champion Shane Douglas for the title. On the same night in Hamburg, PA, Powers defeated Ray Odyssey.

Powers would return to ECW for a one-time appearance on July 28, 1995, defeating Primo Carnera III in Middletown, NY.

=== International World Class Championship Wrestling (1994 - 1995) ===
Powers also wrestled for International World Class Championship Wrestling, and immediately formed a team with Johnny Gunn. Known as the Power Blasters, the duo made their debut on December 12, 1994 in Orwigsburg, Pennsylvania and defeated Greg Valentine & Tony Atlas. The Blasters were undefeated in IWCCW competition, beating The Border Patrol (Agent Maxx & Agent Steele) via disqualification, King Kaluha & The Metal Maniac, and Jimmy Deo & Max Crimson. Powers' last match came on March 4, 1995, when he defeated The Kodiak Bear in New York City, NY.

=== American Wrestling Federation (1994–1995) ===
In 1995, Powers jumped to the short-lived American Wrestling Federation (AWF) on the TV series Warriors of Wrestling where he was a fan favorite. He continued his team-up with Johnny Gunn while in the AWF. During all of their AWF tag matches, Powers and Gunn struggled until Powers lowered his singlet straps to reveal his finely chiseled torso. In apparent awe, the opposing teams instantly withered, the legal men pinned. He lost to Bob Orton Jr in round 3 on April 29, 1995.

Unlike his WWF run, Powers had a more successful run as a whole in the AWF, most of the time coming out victorious, even wrestling enhancement talent alongside his tag-team partner Gunn.

=== Pennsylvania Championship Wrestling (1995) ===
A month later on July 20 at the Silo Nightclub in Reading, Pennsylvania, he faced former nemesis Jeff Jarrett for the vacated PCW Americas Championship. Jarrett was still contracted to the World Wrestling Federation for three days; Bruce Prichard later said he was loaned to PCW as a favor to its owner. Jarrett defeated Powers for the title. Two days, Powers returned the favor, gaining the PCW Americas championship after defeating Jarrett on July 22 in Wind Gap, PA.

=== World Championship Wrestling (1996–1998) ===
Powers joined World Championship Wrestling (WCW), making his initial appearance on the June 10, 1996 WCW Monday Nitro in Wheeling, West Virginia in a match against Diamond Dallas Page. Six days later he appeared in the live pre-show for the Great American Bash, which aired on Main Event, this time losing to VK Wallstreet. On July 7, 1996, he picked up his first WCW victory, pinning Hugh Morrus in a dark match at the Bash at the Beach. The following night, Powers faced Ric Flair in a rematch of their encounter in 1991. He was scouted and then managed for a brief time by Teddy Long as well as being scheduled to form a mid-card stable with “Desperado" Joe Gomez and The Renegade but nothing ever came of it. He was attacked and spray painted during a mid-1996 match by the emerging New World Order (nWo). Powers also teamed briefly with Bobby Walker, and they also were managed by Teddy Long. On July 22, the Teddy Long stable of Powers, Gomez, Renegade, and Alex Wright defeated The Dungeon of Doom quartet of Kevin Sullivan, The Leprechaun (Buddy Lee Parker), Hugh Morrus, and The Barbarian.

In September 1996 he began to acquire several wins, defeating Mr JL, Juventud Guerrera, and Disco Inferno. He defeated Pat Tanaka in the dark match of Halloween Havoc 1996 on October 27. The following night he earned a shot against Dean Malenko for the WCW Cruiserweight Championship on Monday Nitro, but was not successful. A month later he was one of the sixty competitors in the annual World War 3 pay-per-view in 1996.

Still managed by Teddy Long, Powers entered 1997 by facing Hugh Morrus on the January 6th episode of Monday Nitro in Monroe, LA, but was defeated. Shortly afterward, Long's stable fractured, with Joe Gomez and Renegade departing. Teaming with Bobby Walker, Powers faced Gomez and Renegade twice near the start of the year in matches shown on WCW Saturday Night and WCW Pro. Both times they were victorious. On March 4, 1997, Powers and Walker faced Harlem Heat on WCW Saturday Night, but were unsuccessful. On May 3, Powers and Walker face The Armstrong Brothers (Scott Armstrong and Steve Armstrong) on WCW Pro, and again fell in defeat. Powers faced Lex Luger, The Barbarian, Curt Hennig, and others in singles competition during the year, but was winless.

On the January 3, 1998, edition of WCW Worldwide the duo of Powers and Walker made their first appearance together in seven months. Still managed by Teddy Long, they fell to Steve Regal and "Squire" Dave Taylor. Later that day, they appeared in the final episode of WCW Main Event, defeating Johnny Swinger and Casey Tompson. The stable dissolved. Now a singles wrestler, Powers then earned his first individual victory in over a year when he defeated Horshu on the February 17 episode of WCW Saturday Night. He later lost to Bill Goldberg, Scott Norton, and Fit Finlay. His last appearance came on the August 31 episode of Monday Nitro where he competed against Wrath. During his time in WCW he sustained a neck injury which ultimately led to his departure from the company.

=== Retirement (1998–2007) ===
Powers spent close to a decade retired, rehabbing a neck injury.

=== Independent circuit (2007–2010) ===
Jim Powers returned to wrestling for an independent promoter on March 9, 2007. Since returning to wrestling, Powers has wrestled for several independent based organizations and has appeared, pairing back up with Young Stallions partner Paul Roma, at several wrestling fan fests meeting his fans and signing their autographs.

In 2007, Powers was contacted by WWE to be a part of their developmental territory and train wrestlers there. Despite meeting face-to-face with WWE booker, John Laurinaitis, Powers never received a contract with the promotion. Powers said in recent interviews that he almost left his then-current job to work with the WWE, and also said Laurinaitis told him there weren't any places available in the developmental territories, but would call him if there was one. Powers said Laurinaitis repeated this so many times he did not believe him anymore.

On November 15, 2008, he defeated Johnny LeDoux at FCW Broken Bones 2008. He then embarked on the Wrestling Legends Tour 2009, facing Joe E. Legend and Tatanka in March 2009. After a fourteen-year absence (he had appeared on several shows in 1995), Powers rejoined NWA New Jersey. Teaming with Danny Inferno as the tag-team Fire Power, the duo defeated The Spirit Squad (Kenny Dykstra and Mike Mondo) to win the NWA New Jersey Tag-Team Championship.

On February 3, 2010, Powers announced his retirement.

== Personal life ==
In 2012, Powers was hospitalized, and had two hip surgeries.

In July 2016, Powers was named part of a class action lawsuit filed against WWE which alleged that wrestlers incurred traumatic brain injuries during their tenure and that the company concealed the risks of injury. The suit is litigated by attorney Konstantine Kyros, who has been involved in a number of other lawsuits against WWE. US District Judge Vanessa Lynne Bryant dismissed the lawsuit in September 2018.

Powers has been a resident of East Rutherford, New Jersey.

== Championships and accomplishments ==
- NWA Jersey
  - NWA New Jersey Television Tag Team Championship (1 time) – with Danny Inferno
- Northeast Championship Wrestling
  - NCW Tag Team Championship (1 time) - with Ray Apollo
- Pennsylvania Championship Wrestling
  - PCW Americas Championship (1 time)
- Pro Wrestling Illustrated
  - Ranked No. 197 of the 500 best singles wrestlers of the PWI 500 in 1996

== See also ==
- The Young Stallions
