= Faces of Fear =

Professional wrestling tag team

Tag team
- Name: Island Savages, Faces of Terror, Wild Tongans
- Members: The Barbarian; Haku / Meng
- Billed heights: 6 ft 2 in (1.88 m) – Barbarian; 6 ft 1 in (1.85 m) – Haku/Meng
- Combined billed weight: 608 lb (276 kg)
- Hometown: Kingdom of Tonga
- Billed from: Tonga jungle
- Former members: Kurasawa,
- Debut: February 23, 1991,
- Disbanded: February 12, 1999
- Years active: 1991; 1993; 1996-1998; 1999

The Faces of Fear was a professional wrestling tag team of The Barbarian and Meng in World Championship Wrestling (WCW) that existed between 1996 and 1999. The two were first paired together in the World Wrestling Federation (WWF) as part of The Heenan Family, a heel faction, where Meng was known as Haku. In WCW, they teamed together regularly as members of the Dungeon of Doom. They appeared on several WCW pay-per-view events but did not receive a push from the promotion and were unsuccessful in their matches for the World Tag Team Championship. The team separated after The Barbarian turned on Meng in 1998 and they feuded with each other throughout the year. They briefly reunited in 1999 before Barbarian turned on Meng again and the team dissolved.

== Career ==
=== World Wrestling Federation (1990-1991) ===
The Barbarian and Haku began teaming in the WWF as early as 1990, as they were both managed by Bobby Heenan at Survivor Series (1990). They feuded with The Big Bossman, interfering in several of his matches to attack him. They made their only pay-per-view appearance with the WWF at WrestleMania VII, where they lost to The Rockers. They also appeared on several episodes of WWF Prime Time Wrestling in 1991. They faced the Legion of Doom on April 15 but lost when Haku accidentally kicked The Barbarian. The team's miscommunication was a problem again on the July 22 episode when The Barbarian accidentally kicked Haku in a match against The Bushwhackers, causing Haku to get pinned. The Barbarian and Haku were successful the following week, however, when they defeated Sato and Mr. Fuji. The pair left the WWF,

=== New Japan Pro Wrestling (1993) ===
They teamed in New Japan Pro-Wrestling in August 1993. They challenged The Hell Raisers for the IWGP Tag Team Championship but were unable to win the belts.

=== World Championship Wrestling (1996-1999) ===
==== Faces of Fear (1996-1998) ====
In February 1996, The Barbarian returned to WCW and reunited with Haku who was now known as Meng, they were both members of the Dungeon of Doom, a heel stable formed to oppose Hulk Hogan, shortly after Meng and The Barbarian started teaming up again and were managed by Jimmy Hart. Kevin Sullivan (who was also the head booker for WCW) wanted to name the team "The Faces Of Fear" after Sullivan's previous stable The Three Faces of Fear. The Barbarian and Meng's first major appearance together was at Uncensored 1996, when they competed as part of the Alliance To End Hulkamania, a partnership between the Dungeon of Doom and the Four Horsemen, another heel stable. In a two-versus-eight Doomsday Cage match, Hogan and Randy Savage defeated the Alliance To End Hulkamania.

Two months later, at Slamboree 1996, The Barbarian and Meng were on opposing teams in a "Lethal Lottery" tournament that saw partners supposedly chosen at random. The Barbarian teamed with Diamond Dallas Page (subbing for an injured Bobby Walker) in a victory over Meng and Hugh Morrus. The Faces of Fear were not pushed, and they received few high-profile matches in 1996. They competed at WCW's Hog Wild pay-per-view on August 10, but the match was televised on free WCW programming instead of the pay-per-view broadcast. At this event, they teamed with Kevin Sullivan to defeat Joe Gomez, Jim Powers and Mark Starr.

The relationship between the Dungeon of Doom and the Four Horsemen broke down as a result of Kevin Sullivan's feud with Horsemen member Chris Benoit. As a result, the Faces of Fear were booked to face Benoit and Steve McMichael, another member of the Four Horsemen, at Halloween Havoc 1996. Benoit pinned Meng to win the match for the Horsemen team. The Barbarian and Meng's next major appearance was at Starrcade 1996, when they faced Scott Hall and Kevin Nash, who were members of another rival heel stable known as the New World Order. Hall and Nash's WCW World Tag Team Championship was on the line, but the Faces of Fear were unable to win the belts, as Nash pinned The Barbarian.

At SuperBrawl VII on February 23, 1997, the Faces of Fear competed in a Three Way match. They faced The Public Enemy and Harlem Heat but lost when Rocco Rock from The Public Enemy pinned The Barbarian. At Bash at the Beach 1997, the Dungeon of Doom angle stable quietly ended because of Kevin Sullivan's loss to Chris Benoit in a retirement match, but the Faces of Fear continued to team up, however their manager Jimmy Hart was written off television. At Fall Brawl 1997, The Barbarian and Meng faced Wrath and Mortis. Because Wrath and Mortis were part of a heel group, WCW had the Faces of Fear compete as faces during the match. Wrath and Mortis won the match, as Wrath pinned Meng for the victory. In November 1997, Jimmy Hart returned to manage the team and The Faces of Fear were successful at World War 3 1997, when they defeated the team of Glacier and Ernest Miller.

==== Feud and reunion (1998-1999) ====
The Faces of Fear eventually disbanded, as Meng turned face. The former partners faced each other at Road Wild 1998. Meng won the match, but The Barbarian, Hugh Morrus and Jimmy Hart attacked him after the match. Hart later convinced The Barbarian and Meng to reconcile, however, and they wrestled as a tag team again as part of Hart's First Family stable. The Faces of Fear entered a tournament for the WCW World Tag Team Championship in early 1999 after an injury to co-champion Rick Steiner caused the belts to be vacated. According to the rules of the tournament, teams had to lose two matches before they were eliminated. The Faces of Fear won one match in the tournament, defeating the team of David Taylor and Fit Finlay on the January 25 episode of WCW Monday Nitro. However, they were eliminated after losses to the team of Mike Enos and Bobby Duncum, Jr. and the team of Horace Hogan and Brian Adams. In the latter match, The Barbarian attacked Meng, which caused the loss and led to the team's permanent dissolution. The Barbarian left WCW in April 2000 and Meng left WCW in January 2001.

=== Independent Circuit (2001-2024) ===
In January 2001, after Meng left WCW, he reunited with the Barbarian, working for World League Wrestling for a few matches before Meng returned to the WWF, renaming himself Haku.

After Haku was released by the WWF in April 2002, he started teaming with Barbarian until their last recorded match together in 2024.

== Championships and accomplishments ==
- Cauliflower Alley Club
  - Tag Team Award (2019)
- North Carolina Wrestling Association
  - NCWA Tag Team Championship (1 time)
