= Robbie Rage =

American former professional wrestler (born 1970)

Personal information
- Born: Robert J. Knapik; 1970 (age 55–56) Plymouth, Massachusetts

Professional wrestling career
- Ring name(s): Robbie Rage; Rob Rage; Rage; Ruckus
- Billed height: 5 ft 10 in (1.78 m)
- Billed weight: 254 lb (115 kg; 18.1 st)
- Billed from: Anchorage, Alaska
- Trained by: Sgt. Buddy Lee Parker; WCW Power Plant
- Debut: 1995
- Retired: 2007

Robert J. Knapik (born 1970) is an American former professional wrestler. He is best known for his tenure with World Championship Wrestling under the ring name Robbie Rage and as a part of the tag team High Voltage with Kenny Kaos.

== Early life ==
Knapik grew up in Plymouth, Massachusetts and played a variety of sports while growing up, including baseball, hockey, and soccer. Throughout his childhood, he suffered abuse from his father. Knapik began working out to relieve stress, and eventually began taking steroids at age 18. After graduating high school, he attended college, but left after it did not work out.

== Professional wrestling career ==
=== World Championship Wrestling and New Japan Pro-Wrestling (1996–2000) ===
Knapik attended a wrestling show in Florida in 1995 at the suggestion of a friend, and after calling various promoters and wrestling promotions, he was signed to a contract with World Championship Wrestling later on in the year. Along with Kenny Stasiowski, Knapik began training in WCW's Power Plant wrestling school. Upon completion of their training, Knapik and Stasiowski debuted on WCW television under the ring names Ruckus and Kaos, respectively, and they formed the tag team High Voltage. Shortly after debuting, Ruckus was changed to Rage. High Voltage regularly appeared against mid-card opponents on the WCW television shows Saturday Night and WorldWide during the late 1990s, while also appearing as jobbers on Nitro.

In 1997, Rage and Kaos travelled to Japan to perform for New Japan Pro-Wrestling. Upon arriving, they began feuding with nWo Japan, the Japanese version of the New World Order (nWo) before representing WCW in the Super Grade Tag League. Upon their return to the United States, Knapik joined Tim Catalfo's Obake Gym and befriended Yuji Nagata, who was also wrestling in WCW. After suffering a rotator cuff tear, Knapik was sidelined from wrestling for seven months. During this time, High Voltage disbanded as Kaos began competing as a singles wrestler before being nominated by Rick Steiner to become his new tag team partner, resulting in Kaos becoming one half of the World Tag Team Champions. On the December 17, 1998, episode of Thunder, Rage, while sporting a brace to nurse his arm injury, returned to confront Kaos over the matter of allying with Steiner rather than himself to claim the title. On the December 21 episode of Nitro, Rage distracted Kaos in order to allow Lex Luger to defeat him via submission before once again confronting Kaos over High Voltage's split. However, before the angle could develop any further, Knapik was released from his contract during his recovery.

=== Return to NJPW and later career (2000–2002, 2005–2007) ===
After leaving WCW, Knapik, under the ring name Rob Rage, returned to NJPW in 2000 and found success in the mid-card as a singles wrestler until leaving the promotion on July 20, 2002. He lost to Bull Buchanan at a house show for the WWF on February 21, 2000. Knapnik went on a hiatus soon afterwards before returning to wrestling by joining the World Wrestling Council on August 28, 2005. He remained with the WWC until September 14, 2007, when he wrestled his final match during the promotion's Septiembre Negro Tour.

After retiring from wrestling, Knapik began working as a personal trainer.

== Personal life ==
During his recovery for a rotator cuff tear, Knapik became depressed before being released from WCW during his recovery. Soon afterwards he began using, and ultimately became addicted to, painkillers and ecstasy in order to combat his depression. Knapik also lost his home, several cars and a house in Florida due to being unable to pay for them all. After becoming sober, Knapik became a born again Christian.

Knapik has two tattoos. One is a tribal design on his right forearm, while the other is a signature design surrounding kanji on his left forearm.

== Championships and accomplishments ==
- Northern Amateur Wrestling Alliance
  - NAWA Heavyweight Championship (1 time)
- NWA Wildside
  - NWA Wildside Television Championship (1 time)
- Pro Wrestling Illustrated
  - PWI ranked him #186 of the top 500 singles wrestlers of the year in the PWI 500 in 1998
