= The Quebecers =

Professional wrestling tag team in the World Wrestling Federation

Tag team
- Members: Quebecer Jacques/Jacques Rougeau; Quebecer Pierre/Carl Ouellet
- Name(s): The Quebecers; Canadians; The Amazing French-Canadians
- Billed heights: Jacques: 6 ft 1 in (1.85 m); Pierre: 6 ft 1 in (1.85 m)
- Combined billed weight: 534 lb (242 kg)
- Hometown: Montreal, Quebec, Canada
- Billed from: Quebec
- Debut: 1993
- Disbanded: 1998
- Years active: 1993–1998

The Quebecers were a professional wrestling tag team in the World Wrestling Federation (WWF) from in between 1993 and 1994 and again in 1998 who consisted of Quebecer Jacques and Quebecer Pierre. They also worked as The Amazing French-Canadians in World Championship Wrestling under their given names from 1996 to 1997.

== History ==
Jacques Rougeau had previously worked for the WWF both as a tag team wrestler with his brother Raymond Rougeau as The Fabulous Rougeau Brothers and later on as a singles wrestler under the name The Mountie (the Quebecers have since been sometimes confused with the Rougeau Brothers). Pierre had worked on the independent circuit until 1993 where he met Jacques Rougeau in Puerto Rico.

=== World Wrestling Federation ===
Jacques and Pierre were paired up by the WWF, dressed in red and black uniforms that were reminiscent of Jacques’ previous identity as “The Mountie”. They even played off Vince McMahon's legal troubles over the Mountie gimmick by giving the team a theme song that said "We're Not the Mounties", but otherwise was the same as Jacques’ “Mountie” theme song. They were also teamed up with a young charismatic talker, Johnny Polo, who portrayed a preppy rich kid.

They debuted on the July 24, 1993 episode of WWF Superstars and were quickly pushed to the top of the tag team division, challenging The Steiner Brothers for the titles. The match was fought under "Quebec Province Rules" where the tag titles could change hands via disqualification. Jacques took advantage of this rule by tricking Scott Steiner into swinging a hockey stick as a foreign object and getting disqualified, causing the Quebecers to win the titles. In this same match, Polo debuted as the Quebecers' manager by coming to ringside during the match, sporting a Montreal Canadiens sweater.

Their feud with the Steiners continued, they were on opposite sides of the 1993 Survivor Series main event when they joined the "Foreign Fanatics" team with Ludvig Borga and Yokozuna against The Steiners, Lex Luger, and The Undertaker. However, Pierre was replaced by Crush in an injury storyline. The Steiner Brothers never managed to regain the titles from the Quebecers and soon the Quebecers started to defend against other teams.

Apart from the Steiners, the Quebecers focused on teams they deemed easily beatable, including jobbers like Barry Horowitz and Reno Riggins. Horowitz brought in the “1-2-3” Kid as his partner, leading to a series of title defenses against the Kid with changing partners. On January 10, 1994, the Kid and Marty Jannetty won an upset victory and won the gold. However, they lost the titles back to the Quebecers a week later. At the 1994 Royal Rumble, The Quebecers were the opponents during the match where Owen Hart turned on Bret Hart, but only served to bring the turn about, not as integral players in the developing storyline.

The Quebecers looked strong, defending the titles against all comers, including Men on a Mission, who were unsuccessful in their challenge at WrestleMania X, but managed to win the titles in London during a UK tour. They regained the belts two days later in Sheffield. The Quebecers luck finally ran out when they came up against the recently face turned team of The Headshrinkers, who won the tag team titles from them on Monday Night Raw in Burlington, VT, which was the only time a title change occurred in Vermont, causing the team to argue after the match and then fight. After they lost to the Headshrinkers in Montreal; Jacques was attacked by Pierre, who blamed Jacques for costing them both the match and the titles. Their brief feud culminated in Jacques’ (first) retirement match at the Montreal Forum in 1994, which Jacques won.

In early 1995, Pierre was repackaged as a pirate named "Jean-Pierre Lafitte." In early vignettes, Pierre would mention his previous gimmick as the Quebecer and explained that he changed his look and that Pierre's full name was "Jean-Pierre Lafitte" and was a pirate the whole time. Pierre was released in December 1995.

=== World Championship Wrestling ===
Retirement did not last for Jacques Rougeau, as he returned to the ring in 1996 where he reunited with Pierre in World Championship Wrestling. The team had been renamed The Amazing French Canadians and Pierre had reverted to his real name, Carl Ouellet, to avoid trademark issues with the WWF. The duo retained their patriotic nature as they would enthusiastically wave flags of Canada and Quebec during their entrances, in addition to having the Canadian national anthem as their entrance theme. During that time period, they were managed by Col. Robert Parker, who dressed like a comical French Legionnaire and added a smattering of French words to his trademark southern drawl. They began feuding with Harlem Heat, as a result of tension between Parker and Harlem Heat's manager, Sister Sherri. After Harlem Heat defeated the Amazing French Canadians at World War 3 on November 24, 1996, Sherri won the right to fight Parker for five minutes. Parker was beaten down by Sherri, but the rivals later reconciled and fell in love with one another.

The French Canadians participated in what turned out to be Arn Anderson's last wrestling match before his retirement, losing to Anderson and Steve "Mongo" McMichael.

The Amazing French Canadians lost to their old rivals the Steiner Brothers at Clash of the Champions XXXIV on January 21, 1997.

=== Return to the WWF and beyond ===
In mid-1997, Jacques and Pierre were released from WCW and signed with the WWF, making their return in the early part of 1998. Gone were the Mountie uniforms, replaced by maple leaf adorned uniforms reminiscent of their run in WCW. The team was only used sporadically, primarily in losing effort at No Way Out 1998 against The Godwinns and as nondescript participants in the tag team battle royal at WrestleMania XIV before leaving the federation again. Their last match together was in a three-way in Montreal against Mark Henry and Godfather and The New Age Outlaws, which the Outlaws won, on August 2, 1998.

After leaving the WWF, Jacques and Pierre briefly appeared together in WCW as a part of Lance Storm’s Team Canada, but did not team up. Jacques opened up a wrestling school and runs a part-time promotion which both he and Pierre appear for on occasion. Jacques is semi-retired from the ring while Pierre wrestles mostly in Canada, mainly for the Montreal-based International Wrestling Syndicate and the Hull-based CPW International promotion, as Pierre Carl Ouellet.

== Championships and accomplishments ==
- Pro Wrestling Illustrated
  - PWI ranked them #83 of the 100 best tag teams of the PWI Years with in 2003
- World Wrestling Federation
  - WWF Tag Team Championship (3 times)

== See also ==
- The Fabulous Rougeau Brothers
- Team Canada (WCW)
