= Dungeon of Doom =

Professional wrestling stable

Stable
- Members: See below
- Hometown: Iron Gates of Fate
- Debut: May 21, 1995
- Disbanded: July 13, 1997

The Dungeon of Doom was the name of a heel professional wrestling stable in World Championship Wrestling (WCW) which existed from 1995 to 1997.

== History ==
The Dungeon of Doom was created as a stable of wrestlers born from WCW lead producer Kevin Sullivan's kayfabe hatred of Hulk Hogan and was dedicated to ridding WCW of "Hulkamania". The stable was a direct continuation of Sullivan's previous stable The Three Faces of Fear which had a similar goal. The real-life goal of the stable was to put Hogan over. Sullivan stated in 2016, "It was a means to an end. I knew Hogan was being booed. I knew when I saw the nWo, it was the best chance anybody had to turn Hogan. I said, "You gotta trust me." And he did. I [agree with] Satchel Paige. "Don't look back. Something may be gaining on you." You can't change the past. The end justified the means, so in that way, it worked."

After Sullivan defeated The Man with No Name at Slamboree in 1995, The Master told Sullivan he was "The Taskmaster" of the Dungeon of Doom and that the task was to destroy Hulkamania. The group initially consisted of people with rather bizarre and “horrifying” gimmicks such as The Shark (who had teamed with Sullivan before as "Avalanche"), Kamala “The Ugandan Giant”, The Zodiac (who had also teamed with Sullivan before as "The Butcher"), Meng (who was Col. Robert Parker's bodyguard), and Big Van Vader who also sought to destroy Hulkamania and began his “Road Kill Tour” which consisted of a series of squash matches that would lead to his destruction of Hogan. After Vader lost to Hogan, the Master revealed that it was etched in stone that a Giant would destroy Hulkamania, thus leading to several encounters with The Giant, who was presented as the son of André the Giant out for revenge on Hogan for defeating his father.

=== Fighting Hulkamania ===
The feud between the Dungeon of Doom and Hogan with his friends, Dave Sullivan, Sting and the Macho Man, persisted throughout the fall and winter of 95–96 with various members taking on each other with mostly Hogan's group getting the upper hand. Kevin Sullivan tried to use Vader as a pawn against Hogan, but it eventually backfired after a confrontation between Vader and the Giant leading to a WarGames match at Fall Brawl between the entire Dungeon and Hogan's allies. Vader agreed to be on Hogan's team, but he was (kayfabe) injured and Sting suggested Lex Luger take his place. (In reality Vader had been fired due to a backstage fight between himself and Paul Orndorff.)

Macho Man and Hogan reluctantly agreed as there was already distrust towards Luger. Hogan, Randy Savage, Lex Luger and Sting defeated Kamala, The Zodiac, The Shark and Meng to win the match, which per stipulation enabled Hogan to get 5 minutes with Sullivan, also known as The Taskmaster, inside the cage. Before the 5 minutes were up, however, the Giant made his way into the cage and attacked Hogan, (kayfabe) twisting his neck violently as to break it.

After the attack on Hogan, plans were set for a world title match at the Halloween Havoc. During this time the Dungeon shaved Hogan's iconic mustache and succeeded in bringing out the evil within him causing him to don all black instead of his signature red and yellow attire with Macho Man soon following suit. The Master of the Dungeon ensured Kevin Sullivan that the giant would beat Hogan by summoning The Yeti from a block of ice. During WCW Fall Brawl, the Giant used a monster truck to run over Hogan's motorcycle, which led to Hogan and the Giant facing off in a Sumo Monster truck competition on the roof of the Cobo Hall. Hogan won the truck match and then the two started fighting on the roof, resulting in the Giant falling off the roof and (kayfabe) into the Detroit River. For the main event Hogan was trying to apologize but the Giant strolled down the aisle with Kevin Sullivan behind him, with no explanation given as to how he could still be alive. The Giant won the match by disqualification when Hogan's manager Jimmy Hart hit the referee with the title belt, thus betraying Hogan and joining the Dungeon along with Lex Luger who also betrayed Hogan that night. Macho Man came to Hogan's aide after the match but Hogan was assaulted by The Yeti and the Dungeon members beat on Macho Man The next night, Hart revealed that he put a clause in the contract that stated that the championship could change hands on a disqualification, thus making the Giant the new champion.

Due to the unconventional nature of The Giant's title victory, the World Title was vacated and a new champion to be crowned in a Three Ring, 60 man battle royal at an event called World War III. The Hulk Hogan / Dungeon of Doom feud was a focus of the Battle Royal but it would be Randy Savage who won the title, after Hogan, Luger, and Sting eliminated Dungeon member the Giant. However, Hogan was never eliminated. The Giant got revenge by assaulting Macho Man, as Hogan and Sting fended him off, Hogan was put on probation for hitting the Giant with a chair repeatedly. Luger remained a source of dissent between Hogan, Macho Man and Sting with Sting explaining that Luger was his best friend and he was trying to pull Luger away from the Dungeon, while Jimmy Hart assured the Taskmaster he had a plan to keep Luger on their side. In the long term, Luger distracted Sting from helping Hogan and Savage. During this time period, the Dungeon had been joined by Loch Ness, Hugh Morrus, Barbarian, Big Bubba Rogers, and One Man Gang. By the end of 1995, The Master had left WCW, leaving Sullivan as the Dungeon's leader. On the January 22 edition of WCW Monday Nitro, Gang lost to Hogan. Following the match, the Dungeon of Doom and the Horsemen attacked Hogan and Randy Savage. At SuperBrawl VI, Hogan defeated The Giant inside a steel cage and was confronted by the rest of the Dungeon, including Loch Ness. Meng and The Barbarian became a tag team in the stable under the name "The Faces of Fear" which Sullivan (who was the booker for WCW) named after his previous stable "The Three Faces Of Fear."

=== The Dungeon self destructs ===
During the spring of 1996, Dungeon of Doom member Zodiac began warding the Giant away from Hogan. Soon after, Hogan revealed that the man known as "The Zodiac" was actually a spy sent to join the group by Hogan; his old friend had been spying for Hulk the whole time. The revelation transformed the Zodiac into the Booty Man, an ally of Hogan and Randy Savage. The Taskmaster confronted Ric Flair after Four Horsemen member Brian Pillman said some disparaging words towards the Dungeon of Doom. This led to some brief altercations between the two factions until Ric Flair forged the Alliance to End Hulkamania (which consisted of several Dungeon members as well as Ric Flair and Arn Anderson). At this point, the "Alliance" became the focal point while the Dungeon of Doom itself became less prominent. As tensions were brewing between Hogan and Savage as to who would challenge Flair for the world title, they engaged in a series of team matches against Flair and a Dungeon member, some of which the Booty Man was a part of. The Dungeon of Doom expanded its roster by bringing in Z-Gangsta and the Ultimate Solution, attempting to defeat Hogan and Savage once and for all.

Meanwhile, Lex Luger's only ties to the Dungeon were his manager Jimmy Hart who seemingly persuaded Luger to join the Alliance, and the match as a final favor in their fading relationship. A grudge between the Giant and Loch Ness soon developed over who was the only true Giant of WCW. This ended with Giant beating Loch Ness at the Uncensored event that month. Hogan and Savage defeated the Alliance to End Hulkamania at Uncensored inside the Tower of Doom Steel Cage. The Booty Man proved to be a key factor in Hogan and Savage's victory by supplying them with weapons towards the end of the match. Luger would also prove to be a major factor in the outcome, and would no longer be associated with the Dungeon. After the loss, the Alliances fell apart, as the Taskmaster started feuding with Horsemen member Chris Benoit, the Giant was confronted by Luger after attacking Sting as part of Jimmy Hart's plan to separate the duo, and the Shark would face Luger one on one, and both the Giant and Luger challenged Flair for the title, with the Giant eventually beating Flair. The feud between the Dungeon and Four Horsemen, along with Shark going solo under his real name John Tenta, and The Giant and Big Bubba's defection to the nWo, would ultimately lead to the collapse of the Dungeon. Chris Benoit defeated Sullivan in a Retirement Match at Bash at the Beach 1997 after Jacqueline turned on Sullivan and hit him over the head with a chair, leading to Benoit scoring the pinfall, thus ending the Dungeon of Doom stable. Meng and The Barbarian continued to team under the Faces of Fear name, but Hugh Morris went his separate ways. Jimmy Hart was written off television for a few months and returned in November 1997 to manage the Faces of Fear and Hugh Morris but the Dungeon of Doom name was not used.

=== Legacy ===
In late 1998, Jimmy Hart formed a new version of his old Continental Wrestling Association stable The First Family which consisted of Dungeon of Doom members Meng, The Barbarian and Hugh Morris. Barbarian would inexplicably turn on Meng during a match in a WCW World Tag Team Championship tournament match on the February 11, 1999 episode of WCW Thunder.

Kevin Sullivan established a new version of the Dungeon of Doom in the New York City-based independent USA Pro Wrestling promotion in 2002. This version consisted of Gangrel, Luna Vachon, The Wall, Psycho Sam Dudley and "Hardrock" Ken Sweeney.

== Members ==
WCW

- The Master (1995)
- The Taskmaster (1995-1997)
- Kamala (1995)
- Lex Luger (1995-1996)
- The Yeti (1995)
- Jimmy Hart (1995-1997, manager)
- The Shark (1995-1996)
- Big Van Vader (1995)
- The Zodiac (1995-1996)
- Meng (1995-1997)
- The Giant (1995-1996)
- Hugh Morrus (1995-1997)
- The Barbarian (1996-1997)
- Konnan (1996-1997)
- Maxx (1996-1997)
- Big Bubba (1996)
- Braun The Leprechaun (1996)
- One Man Gang (1996)
- Z-Gangsta (1996)
- The Ultimate Solution (1996)
- Loch Ness (1996)
- Jacqueline (1997)

Independent circuit

- The Wall
- Gangrel
- Luna Vachon
- Psycho Sam Dudley
- "Hardrock" Ken Sweeney

== Championships and accomplishments ==
- Asistencia Asesoría y Administración

- AAA Americas Heavyweight Championship (1 time) – Konnan

- World Championship Wrestling

- WCW World Heavyweight Championship (2 times) – The Giant
- WCW United States Heavyweight Championship (1 time) – One Man Gang
- WCW World Television Championship (2 times) – Lex Luger
- WCW World Tag Team Championship (1 time) – Lex Luger

- Wrestling Observer Newsletter

- Worst Feud of the Year (1995) vs. Hulk Hogan
