= DeWayne Bruce =

American professional wrestler (born 1962)

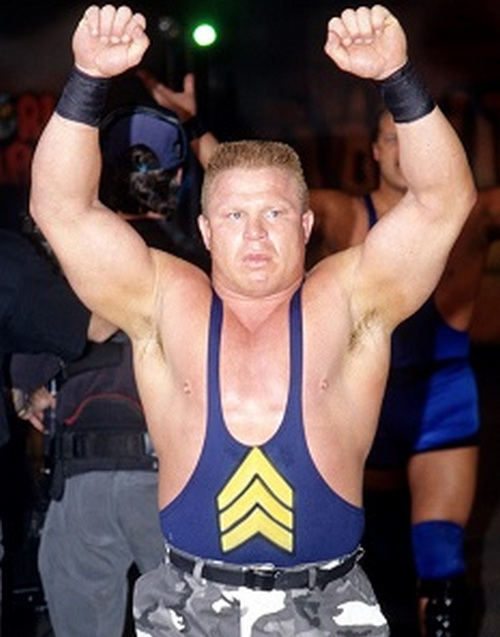
- Bruce in 1998

Personal information
- Born: DeWayne Bruce; August 2, 1962 (age 63) Atlanta, Georgia, U.S.

Professional wrestling career
- Ring name(s): Braun the Leprechaun; DeWayne Bruce; Jack Boot; The Leprechaun; Sarge; Sgt. Buddy Lee Parker
- Billed height: 5 ft 8 in (173 cm)
- Billed weight: 231 lb (105 kg)
- Debut: November 12, 1987
- Retired: 2011

DeWayne Bruce (born August 2, 1962) is an American retired professional wrestler. He is best known for his appearances with World Championship Wrestling under the ring name Sgt. Buddy Lee Parker.

== Professional wrestling career ==
=== World Championship Wrestling (1989–2001) ===
==== The State Patrol (1989–1991) ====
Bruce debuted in World Championship Wrestling in 1989, using his real name as a preliminary wrestler, then earned some undercard notoriety as Sgt. Buddy Lee Parker, competing in a tag-team with partner Lt. James Earl Wright, as The State Patrol.

==== Singles competitor (1991–1994) ====
From 1991 to 1994, Bruce competed in the singles division.

==== The State Patrol (1994–1996) ====
The State Patrol reformed their tag team in February 1994. They teamed until May 1996.

==== Dungeon of Doom; Jack Boot (1996) ====
In the summer of 1996, Bruce became a member of the Dungeon of Doom, under the short-lived identity of Braun The Leprechaun.

In the fall of 1996, he was repackaged as "Military Man" Jack Boot.

==== Singles competitor (1996–2001) ====
Boot only lasted a short time before Buddy Lee Parker returned, but this time as a Military Sergeant. This was Bruce's final wrestling persona, later simply going by Sarge. After his semi-retirement, he became the head trainer at the official WCW wrestling school, the Power Plant. He would occasionally pop up on WCW Saturday Night as a carpenter during the end of his career, but he received praise by WCW commentators crediting him for training many of the highly popular superstars of WCW, most notably Bill Goldberg. Despite losing most of his televised matches, Bruce scored a few notable victories throughout his career (although mostly against jobbers or other carpenters). Bruce had respect from his peers, and was known to lose matches against newcomers to help elevate younger talent. Bruce was also notable for being the first wrestler to lose to newcomers (to WCW) such as "Cowboy" Bob Orton, Jr (who had an almost unbeaten streak in the company around the time) and The Iron Sheik.

Towards the very end of WCW, Bruce was involved in a somewhat major match, in which he teamed with his former trainee, Bill Goldberg, to face the team of Lex Luger and Buff Bagwell (then known as Totally Buffed). This would end up being Bruce's final WCW appearance.

==== WCW Power Plant ====
Bruce was the head trainer at WCW's developmental school, the WCW Power Plant. While Bruce has been criticized for his intense workout sessions while in charge of the WCW Power Plant, he is also remembered in a positive light, especially when recounting many of the notable performers he trained during his tenure in WCW, such as Bill Goldberg, Big Show, Chuck Palumbo, Mark Jindrak, Sean O'Haire, Mike Sanders, Stacy Keibler, Daffney and Torrie Wilson.

Batista recounted his encounter with Bruce in his WWE-produced DVD, Batista Unleashed. Batista claims that, when he went for an open tryout at the WCW Power Plant, Bruce drilled him into the ground with an intensely-grueling workout regimen, causing him to throw up viciously. Despite his resistance, Bruce reportedly demanded he continue the tryout due to his look and size, which he did.

Bruce also made an appearance on Louis Theroux's Weird Weekends, where he forced Louis Theroux to exercise until he got physically sick.

=== All Japan Pro Wrestling (1991, 1992) ===
During 1991 and 1992, Bruce traveled to Japan to compete for All Japan Pro Wrestling (AJPW), while still under contract with WCW. Bruce teamed with a variety of tag-team partners in AJPW, however, much like in WCW, AJPW used Bruce as "enhancement talent". Despite rarely winning, Bruce did have some notable moments in his AJPW tenure. Bruce stopped competing for AJPW in March 1992, and returned to Atlanta, to again work for WCW.

=== Late career (2001, 2004, 2011) ===
After WCW, DeWayne would once again portray the Sgt. Buddy Lee Parker gimmick to wrestle for Xcitement Wrestling Federation in 2001 at their first tapings, losing to Jimmy Snuka Jr. After not performing for nearly 3 years, DeWayne defeated Steve Sellars at UCW Clash Of Champions. He then finally wrestled his last match in 2011 on the losing end of a 6-man tag team match on a show called A Night To Remember.

Bruce returned in 2021 as part of the revived Georgia Championship Wrestling where he is currently serving as a ringside authority figure. In addition to his authority role, he is known to agent & critique matches on the events as well as holding training with many of the independent performers on those cards.

== Championships and accomplishments ==
- World Wrestling Council
  - WWC Caribbean Tag Team Championship (1 time) - with Lt. James Earl Wright
- Pro Wrestling Illustrated
  - Ranked No. 370 of the top 500 singles wrestlers in the PWI 500 in 1991
