= The Barbarian (wrestler) =

Tongan professional wrestler (born 1958)

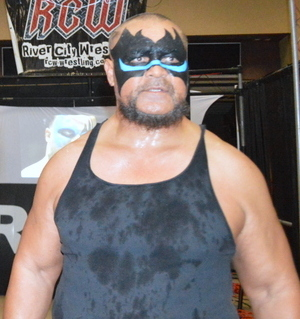
- The Barbarian in 2016

Personal information
- Born: Sione Havea Vailahi; 6 September 1958 (age 68) Nukuʻalofa, Tonga
- Spouse: Seini Tonga
- Children: 7
- Family: Lei'D Tapa (niece)

Professional wrestling career
- Ring name(s): The Barbarian; Headshrinker Sione; King Konga; Konga the Barbarian; Sachinoshima; Sione; Super Assassin #1; Tonga John
- Billed height: 6 ft 2 in (188 cm)
- Billed weight: 300 lb (136 kg)
- Trained by: Red Bastien
- Debut: 1980

Sachinoshima
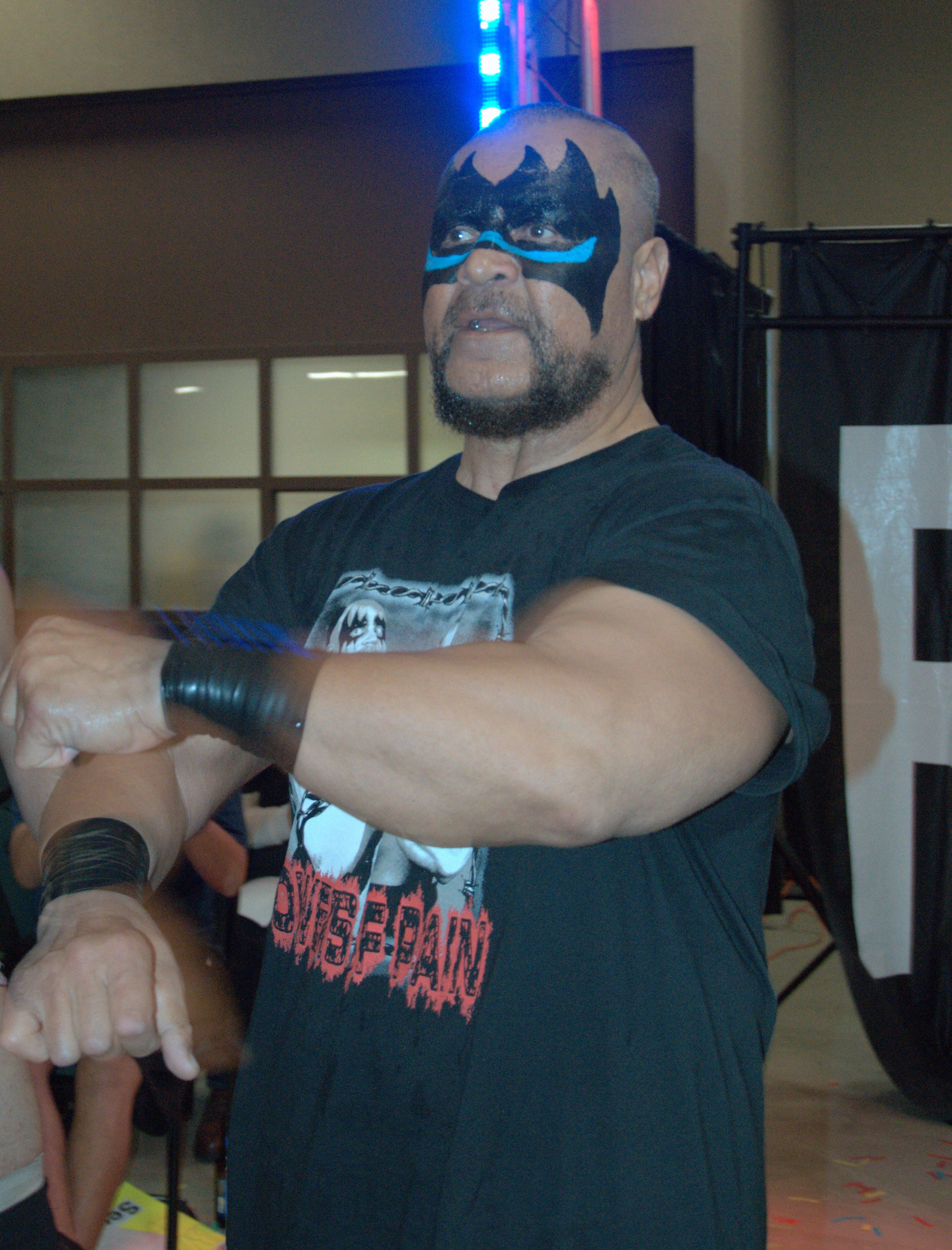

Personal information
- Native name: 幸島
- Born: Sione Vailahi; 6 September 1958 (age 68) Tonga
- Height: 184 cm (72 in)
- Weight: 100 kg (220 lb)

Sport
- Sport: Sumo
- Retired: September 1976
- Heya: Asahiyama
- Record: 34-13-16
- Debut: March 1975
- Highest rank: Sandanme 36 (September 1976)
- Updated on 8 September 2022

Sione Havea Vailahi (born 6 September 1958) is a Tongan professional wrestler, better known by his ring name, The Barbarian. He is best known for his various stints with Jim Crockett Promotions, World Championship Wrestling (WCW) and World Wrestling Federation (WWF) and for being a part of tag teams the Powers of Pain with The Warlord and the Faces of Fear with Meng.

His first national exposure was in the NWA territory Jim Crockett Promotions, where the Powers of Pain held the NWA World Six-Man Tag Team Championship until they departed the company in 1988 and joined WWF, where they competed in the tag team division until the team was quietly split in 1990. Barbarian then competed as a singles wrestler until departing in 1992 and returning to WCW, where he became one-half of the final WCW United States Tag Team Champions with Dick Slater. During this time, Barbarian challenged Ron Simmons for the WCW World Heavyweight Championship at Halloween Havoc 1992. He left WCW in 1993 and returned to the WWF in 1994 as Headshrinker Sione to form the New Headshrinkers with Fatu. He left the company in 1995 and made a second return to WCW, where he briefly reunited with The Warlord as the masked Super Assassins. Barbarian would then join Meng to form Faces of Fear and become a part of factions Dungeon of Doom and the First Family.

== Early life ==
Born and raised in Tonga, Sione was one of six teenagers and young men sent by the King of Tonga to Japan to study Sumo wrestling in the mid-1970s. Tonga Fifita was also part of the group. Sione was known in sumo circles as Sachinoshima.

== Professional wrestling career ==
=== Early career (1980–1984) ===
After migrating to the United States, he trained in professional wrestling under the tutelage of Rolland 'Red' Bastien. In 1980, he made his debut, wrestling Killer Karl Krupp in Modesto, California. He wrestled as King Konga in several National Wrestling Alliance (NWA) regional territories in 1981. He soon went to the NWA's Jim Crockett Promotions, where he teamed up with Ron Garvin as a fan favorite. He had a short term in World Class Championship Wrestling as a villain named Tonga John. In 1984, Sione wrestled in the CWA in Memphis, feuding with Jerry Lawler.

=== Jim Crockett Promotions (1984–1988) ===
==== Paul Jones' Army (1984–1986) ====
Seeing the monster villain potential in a huge, intimidating man with surprising agility, now back in Crockett's territory Jim Crockett, Jr. changed Vailahi into Konga the Barbarian. He debuted in JCP on 29 December 1984 episode of WorldWide after a match between Assassin #1 and Kareem Mohammad as a member of Paul Jones' Army. He defeated Sam Houston in his first match later in the night. Vailahi was brought into the company to aid Jones in his rivalry with Jimmy Valiant. He was paired with Superstar Billy Graham under the management of Jones. At the inaugural The Great American Bash, Barbarian teamed with Graham and Abdullah the Butcher in a loss to Sam Houston, Manny Fernandez and Buzz Tyler in a six-man tag team match. Following the event, Barbarian occasionally teamed with Abdullah and turned on Graham by the end of the year. Barbarian lost to Graham in an arm wrestling contest and then in a singles match at Starrcade '85: The Gathering. At the NWA/AWA Star Wars, Vailahi lost to Capitol Sports Promotions star Carlos Colón. Vailahi frequently teamed with Black Bart, Shaska Whatley, Teijho Khan, as well as Baron von Raschke throughout 1986. Vailahi teamed with Raschke to participate in the 1986 Crockett Cup, losing to Jimmy Valiant and Manny Fernandez in the opening round. It was during this time that "Konga" was dropped from his name and he became simply The Barbarian. Raschke left Jones' team and became a rival of the group. At Starrcade '86: The Skywalkers, Whatley and Barbarian lost to Hector Guerrero and Raschke in a tag team match.

==== The Powers of Pain (1987–1988) ====
Vailahi entered the 1987 Crockett Cup with Bill Dundee, beating Tim Horner and Mike Rotunda in the opening round and lost to The Super Powers (Dusty Rhodes and Nikita Koloff) in the second round. Vailahi teamed with the likes of Manny Fernandez and Vladimir Petrov throughout 1987. In 1987, he appeared in the movie Body Slam, as Axe, of the tag team called The Cannibals. In late 1987, he formed a team with Ivan Koloff, who was also his coach. During this time, he formed The Powers of Pain with The Warlord and the team began feuding heavily with another team of big men, The Road Warriors (Animal and Hawk). Vailahi made his pay-per-view debut at the Bunkhouse Stampede Finals pay-per-view on 24 January 1988, as a participant in a Steel cage Bunkhouse Stampede. He was the runner-up, being eliminated by Dusty Rhodes. They injured Animal's eye in storyline during a weightlifting contest and soon after teamed with Ivan Koloff to beat Rhodes and Road Warriors to win the NWA World Six-Man Tag Team Championship at a live event on 12 February. Koloff and Powers of Pain would lose to Rhodes and Road Warriors in a barbed wire match at Clash of the Champions I on 27 March. The following month, Powers of Pain entered the 1988 Crockett Cup, defeating Mark Starr and Chris Champion in the second round and Road Warriors in the quarter-final and lost to eventual winners Lex Luger and Sting in the semi-final. In April 1988, Crockett decided he wanted the feuding tag teams to have a series of scaffold matches, which neither team wanted because they felt that they were too large to safely participate. This was especially so for the Powers of Pain, who were scheduled to lose the matches by falling off the scaffolding. Barbarian and Warlord decided to leave the company. The NWA announcers explained that the Road Warriors had run them off, even though they still held the World Six-Man Tag Team Championship.

=== World Wrestling Federation (1988–1992) ===
==== The Powers of Pain (1988–1990) ====
Upon their arrival in WWF, the Powers of Pain were fan favorites, initially managed by Tito Santana, They feuded with WWF World Tag Team Champions Demolition who had defeated Strike Force (Santana and Rick Martel) for the titles and then injured Martel (kayfabe). The Powers were introduced as mercenaries to help Martel and Santana gain revenge on Demolition for both the title loss and the injury to Martel. They made their debut in a dark match at a TV taping on 18 June 1988 as a replacement for Strike Force in a WWF World Tag Team Championship match where they beat Demolition by count-out when the champions walked out. Their televised debut was filmed June 21 in Glens Falls and screened on the July 16 episode of Superstars where - earlier in the night, in a dark match taped and later released on DVD, having gained another countout win over Demolition when the champions again walked out - they defeated enhancement talents Iron Mike Sharpe and Tony Ulysses. The Powers had their first televised rivalry against The Bolsheviks (Nikolai Volkoff and Boris Zhukov). They defeated Bolsheviks in their pay-per-view debut at the inaugural SummerSlam, where they introduced their new manager The Baron. The Baron left the WWF in early November.

At the Survivor Series, The Powers led a team of fan favorite tag teams against Demolition's team of villainous tag teams in a Survivor Series match, during which a double turn took place when Demolition's manager Mr. Fuji turned on Demolition by causing them to get eliminated by count-out. The Powers afterwards came to Fuji's aid and thus became villains and Demolition became fan favorites. The Powers of Pain then eliminated Los Conquistadores to win the match before Demolition returned to the ring to confront the Powers and Fuji. Following this, Demolition and the Powers (with Fuji now in their corner) engaged in a series of championship matches at house shows, typically ending in double disqualification or a narrow countout victory for the Powers. On 12 December episode of Prime Time Wrestling, Fuji was confirmed as the new manager of The Powers of Pain.

Barbarian entered the Royal Rumble match at the 1989 Royal Rumble pay-per-view as the number 26 entrant. He and Ted DiBiase eliminated Brutus Beefcake and Hercules, before Barbarian was eliminated by Rick Martel. On 20 February episode of Prime Time Wrestling, Powers of Pain received an opportunity for the Tag Team Championship against Demolition, which they lost via disqualification. At WrestleMania V, Powers of Pain and Mr. Fuji competed against Demolition for the title in a handicap match, where Demolition retained the title by pinning Fuji. At Survivor Series, Powers of Pain and Demolition were on opposing teams as Powers of Pain were paired with Ted DiBiase and Zeus in the Million $ Team against Hulk Hogan's Hulkamaniacs (Demolition and Jake Roberts). Powers of Pain eliminated both members of Demolition before being disqualified for double teaming Hogan. Hulkamaniacs won the match. After coming up short in their title hunt, Powers of Pain feuded with tag teams such as The Hart Foundation, The Bushwhackers and The Rockers. Barbarian participated in the 1990 Royal Rumble match as the number 28 entrant. He was eliminated by Hercules. Powers of Pain faced Demolition for the last time in a tag team match on 10 February episode of Superstars, which Demolition won by disqualification. Powers of Pain's last televised match as a team was on 19 February televised special on the MSG Network, where they teamed with Mr. Fuji against Jim Duggan and The Rockers in a match, which they lost. On 3 March episode of Superstars, it was announced that Barbarian would face Tito Santana at WrestleMania VI. The following week on Superstars, it was announced that Fuji had sold the contracts of Powers of Pain, thus splitting up the team. Powers of Pain had their last match as a team on 25 March, where they lost to Hulk Hogan and The Big Boss Man.

==== Singles competition (1990–1992) ====
On 24 March episode of Superstars, Bobby Heenan became the manager of Barbarian. As a member of Heenan's faction, Barbarian's image was tweaked: he grew out his Road Warrior-like mohawk and face paint, instead wearing a fur cloak, a helmet with reindeer-like antlers, and a skull to the ring. He briefly wrestled in singles competition, defeating Tito Santana at WrestleMania VI. He was a member of Natural Disasters (Earthquake, Dino Bravo and Haku) against The Hulkamaniacs (Hulk Hogan, Big Boss Man, Tugboat and Jim Duggan) at Survivor Series. Hulkamaniacs won. On 22 December episode of Superstars, it was announced that Barbarian would face Heenan Family's rival The Big Boss Man in a match at the 1991 Royal Rumble, which Barbarian lost. He would also lose a subsequent rematch to Boss Man on 18 February episode of Prime Time Wrestling. Barbarian was paired with Heenan Family member Haku in a tag team on 23 February episode of Superstars, where it was announced that the duo would face The Rockers at WrestleMania VII. Their first match as a team was on 9 March episode of Superstars, where they defeated enhancement talents. Barbarian and Haku lost the match to Rockers at WrestleMania VII. Later in the event, Haku and Barbarian helped Mr. Perfect retain the Intercontinental Championship against Big Boss Man. Barbarian was utilized as a mid-carder throughout the year.

During this time, Barbarian had only one major match, a loss to The British Bulldog at Battle Royal at the Albert Hall. Immediately after the match, Barbarian participated in a battle royal, in which he was eliminated by Tito Santana. On 1 December episode of Wrestling Challenge, it was announced that Barbarian would challenge Bret Hart for the Intercontinental Championship at This Tuesday in Texas but no-showed the event and was replaced by Skinner. On 18 January 1992, Barbarian reunited with his Powers of Pain tag team partner The Warlord in a loss to New Foundation (Owen Hart and Jim Neidhart). Barbarian participated in the 1992 Royal Rumble match for the vacant WWF Championship as the number eight entrant. He was eliminated by Hercules. He left the WWF in February 1992 and went to Japan. He returned to JCP, which had become World Championship Wrestling (WCW).

=== World Championship Wrestling (1992–1993) ===
Barbarian made his televised debut in WCW as a villain on 4 July episode of Saturday Night, where he defeated Steve Pritchard. On 12 July episode of Main Event, Barbarian and Dick Slater were booked to defeat The Fabulous Freebirds (Jimmy Garvin and Michael Hayes) for the United States Tag Team Championship. However, this was the last match for this title as the title was retired a month later. Barbarian was heavily pushed throughout the summer with a winning streak against the likes of Brian Pillman, Tom Zenk, Marcus Alexander Bagwell and Barry Windham. He was placed in an alliance with Tony Atlas, Cactus Jack, Jake Roberts and Butch Reed. Their main rival was Ron Simmons, whom Barbarian unsuccessfully challenged for the World Heavyweight Championship at the Halloween Havoc pay-per-view. Barbarian entered the King of Cable Tournament, losing to Dustin Rhodes in the quarter-final on 14 November episode of Saturday Night. On 18 November Clash of the Champions XXI, Barbarian, Cactus Jack and Tony Atlas lost to Simmons and his debuting partner 2 Cold Scorpio in a handicap match. Barbarian appeared at the company's premier pay-per-view Starrcade '92: Battlebowl – The Lethal Lottery II on 29 December, where he was randomly paired with Kensuke Sasaki against Big Van Vader and Dustin Rhodes in a Lethal Lottery qualifying match, which the latter duo won.

On 13 January 1993 Clash of the Champions XXII, Barbarian was supposed to team with Vader, Paul Orndorff and Barry Windham against Sting, Dustin Rhodes and Ron Simmons in a Thundercage match but Barbarian was kicked out of his team by Harley Race for siding with Cactus Jack. As a result, Barbarian turned into a heroic character. On 17 January episode of Main Event, Barbarian and Jack faced Vader and Orndorff in a match, which ended in a double disqualification. The two teams faced off in a no disqualification match on 23 January episode of Power Hour which Vader and Orndorff won. On 30 January episode of Saturday Night, Barbarian lost to Orndorff in singles competition. Barbarian received a title match against Vader for the World Heavyweight Championship on 7 February episode of Main Event, where Vader retained the title. Barbarian made his last televised appearance on 7 March episode of Main Event, where he lost to Steve Regal in the first round match of a tournament for the vacant World Television Championship. He would compete on the house show circuit for the next few months and departed the company in June. For the remainder of 1993, he worked in Japan, Germany, Puerto Rico and India.

=== Return to WWF (1994–1995) ===
On 6 June 1994, Barbarian returned to the WWF at a house show to face Razor Ramon as a substitute for Diesel. He would wrestle numerous matches on house shows against the likes of Lex Luger, Tatanka and Typhoon for the next two months. On 1 September, Barbarian replaced an injured Samu and teamed with Fatu against Two Dudes with Attitudes (Shawn Michaels and Diesel) for the Tag Team Championship, just a few days after Michaels and Diesel had beaten The Headshrinkers (Fatu and Samu) for the titles. Later that month, he permanently replaced Samu and was renamed Seone, one half of the new version of The Headshrinkers with Fatu after Samu left the WWF. On 10 October episode of Monday Night Raw, Vailahi made his televised return to WWF. The new combination made only one pay-per-view appearance as a team which was at the Survivor Series event as part of The Bad Guys (Razor Ramon, 1-2-3 Kid and The British Bulldog) against The Teamsters (Shawn Michaels, Diesel, Jeff Jarrett, Owen Hart and Jim Neidhart). New Headshrinkers were quickly eliminated but their team won the match after Michaels and Diesel broke up as a team. This resulted in Michaels vacating the Tag Team Championship and a tournament was set up to crown the new champions. New Headshrinkers participated in the tournament, beating Owen Hart and Jim Neidhart by disqualification in the quarter-final round on 31 December episode of Superstars, before losing to Bam Bam Bigelow and Tatanka in the semi-final round on 14 January 1995 episode of Superstars. Seone participated in the 1995 Royal Rumble match as the number six entrant. He eliminated Kwang and Rick Martel and then he and Eli Blu eliminated each other. This sparked a feud between New Headshrinkers and The Blu Brothers (Jacob and Eli), in which New Headshrinkers came up short. New Headshrinkers received an opportunity for the Tag Team Championship against Owen Hart and Yokozuna on 6 May episode of Superstars, but lost the match. By July, the Headshrinkers dissolved, as Vailahi left the WWF for WCW.

While WWE currently references Vailahi as Sione on their website, the character's name was actually spelled Seone on television and in WWF Magazine during his 1994–1995 run.

=== Return to WCW (1995–2000) ===
==== Super Assassins (1995–1996) ====
In late 1995, Vailahi returned to WCW, wearing a mask and teaming with his former Powers of Pain tag team partner, The Warlord. They were known as the masked "Super Assassins", managed by Col. Robert Parker. Super Assassins made their televised debut on 27 November episode of Prime, with a win over the American Males. No mention was ever made on television of their former identities, and the team did not last long as Warlord left WCW in early 1996.

==== Dungeon of Doom and Faces of Fear (1996–1998) ====
Later on, he was added into Kevin Sullivan's Dungeon of Doom and was paired with Dungeon teammate Haku (now known as Meng) in a tag team called Faces of Fear on 29 January episode of Monday Nitro, where they lost to the returning Road Warriors. Faces of Fear were part of Alliance to End Hulkamania against Hulk Hogan and Randy Savage in a Doomsday Cage match at Uncensored, which Hogan and Savage won. At the Slamboree pay-per-view, Barbarian was randomly paired with Diamond Dallas Page in a Lethal Lottery match, where they defeated Meng and Hugh Morrus in the first match and then Rick Steiner and The Booty Man in the second match to qualify for the Lord of the Ring battle royal, in which Vailahi was the runner-up, being eliminated by Page. Dungeon of Doom were entered into a rivalry with Four Horsemen, stemming from The Taskmaster's rivalry with Horsemen member Chris Benoit over Woman. At the Halloween Havoc pay-per-view, Faces of Fear lost to Horsemen members Benoit and Steve McMichael in a tag team match. Faces of Fear began pursuing the World Tag Team Championship as they faced The Outsiders (Scott Hall and Kevin Nash) and Nasty Boys (Brian Knobbs and Jerry Sags) in a triangle match for the title at World War 3, where Outsiders retained the title. Faces of Fear received another title match against Outsiders at Starrcade but failed to win the title.

Faces of Fear competed in the tag team division throughout 1997 and failed to get any championship success. Dungeon of Doom disbanded after Taskmaster's retirement. Faces of Fear would then feud with Wrath and Mortis, whom they faced in a losing effort at Fall Brawl. On 29 September episode of Monday Nitro, Barbarian lost to newcomer Goldberg, becoming one of the earliest victims of his undefeated streak. Faces of Fear had their next rivalry against Glacier and Ernest Miller, whom they defeated at World War 3. On 12 February 1998 episode of Thunder, Barbarian tried to separate Meng from Hugh Morrus after Meng defeated Morrus and refused to release the Tongan Death Grip. Meng then applied the hold on Barbarian as well, thus breaking up Faces of Fear. Barbarian formed a tag team with Morrus under the management of Jimmy Hart and feuded with Meng throughout the year. The former partners competed in the opening match of the Road Wild pay-per-view, where Meng defeated Barbarian.

==== The First Family; departure (1999–2000) ====
Jimmy Hart reunited Faces of Fear in early 1999 and put them in a tournament for the vacated World Tag Team Championship. Barbarian turned on Meng during a tournament match against Bobby Duncum, Jr. and Mike Enos on 12 February episode of Thunder by striking Meng with the Kick of Fear. Barbarian continued his rivalry with Meng throughout the year. In the spring of 1999, Barbarian formed a short-lived alliance with Hugh Morrus, which led to the two receiving several title shots for the World Tag Team Championship but failed to win the titles. As part of this alliance, Barbarian faced his former partner Meng and Jerry Flynn in various tag team matches including a street fight on 10 April episode of Saturday Night. Barbarian and Morrus lost all of these matches.

This would later lead to Barbarian being placed in Jimmy Hart's First Family faction with, Hugh Morrus, Brian Knobbs and Jerry Flynn in the summer of 1999. First Family found little success, failing to win the WCW World Tag Team Championship from the team of Konnan and Billy Kidman on 11 November episode of Thunder. This resulted in the group completely dissolving within only two months, and all the members of the faction went their separate ways.

Barbarian's last televised match in WCW was on 29 March 2000 episode of Thunder, a loss to the WCW World Television Champion Jim Duggan. WCW terminated Barbarian's contract in April 2000 in an effort of lowering budget costs.

=== Late career (2000–present) ===
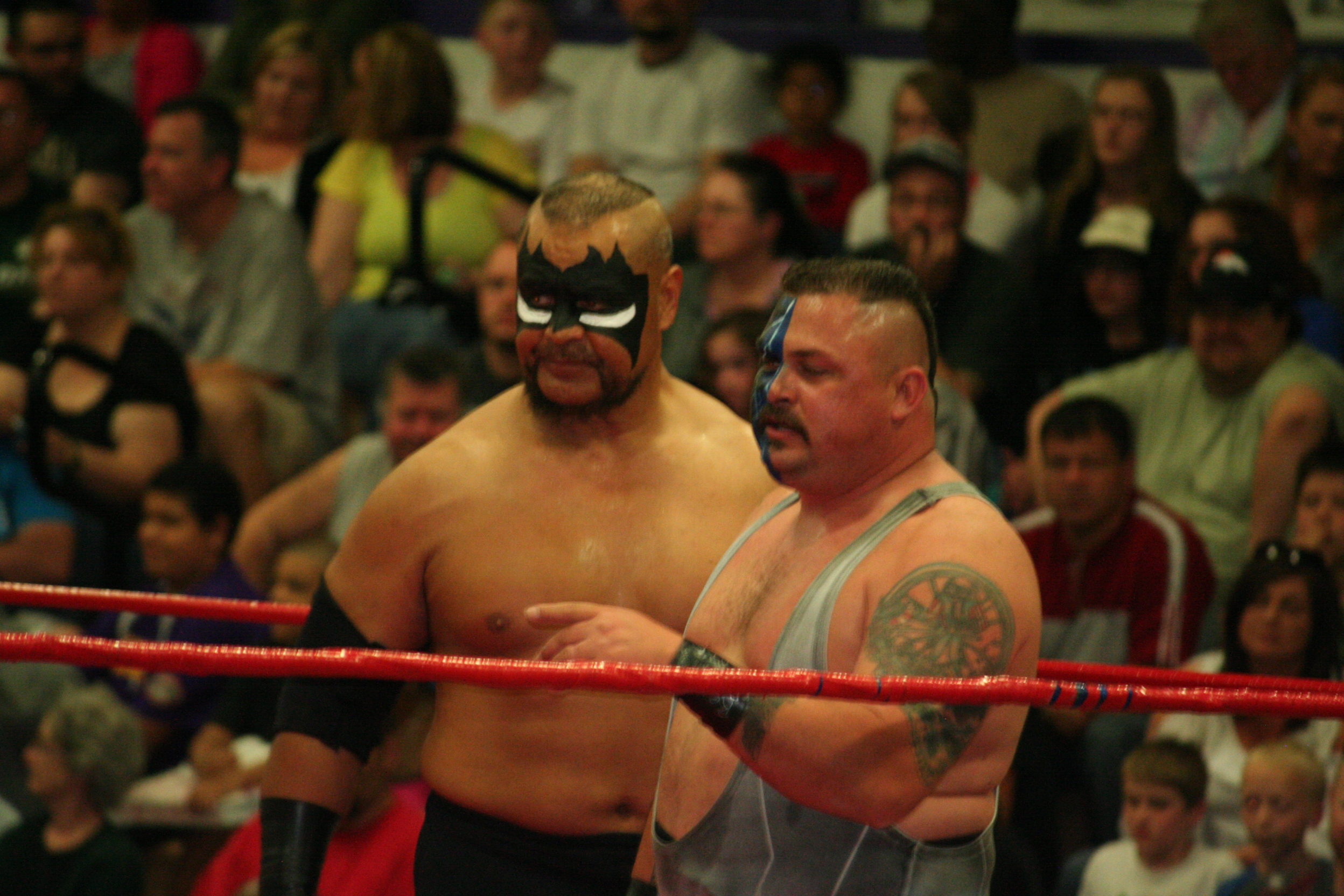
Barbarian (left) with Buz at an independent event in 2013

After leaving WCW, The Barbarian wrestled in Australia's i-Generation Superstars of Wrestling in July and August 2000. He defeated Curt Hennig for the i-Generation World Heavyweight Championship. A day later, he dropped the title back to Hennig.

In March 2004, The Barbarian won the NWA Virginia Heavyweight Championship, and feuded with David Flair for the title, until he was ruled ineligible to compete due to a lack of a valid Virginia wrestling license. In 2005, The Barbarian again teamed with The Warlord in Gladiator Championship Wrestling, and renewed his feud with Road Warrior Animal. In 2007, at the Annual Championship Wrestling/IRW Fun Fest Slam in Kingsport, Tennessee, The Barbarian wrestled 'Big' Steve Fury, the CW Heavyweight Champion, in front of 1,100 people. He also made an appearance in IWA Mid South, at the April Bloodshowers 2007 event, where he wrestled Jimmy Jacobs. In 2008, The Barbarian teamed with Demolition Ax (Bill Eadie), and managed by Ted DiBiase, in Seagrove North Carolina, defeating Cowboy Willie Watts and Leroy Greene. In 2009, The Barbarian teamed with the Iron Chief in the Ivan Koloff's tag team tournament in the Allied Independent Wrestling Federation (AIWF). In August 2012, Chikara announced that The Barbarian would be making his debut for the promotion in the following month's 2012 King of Trios tournament, where he will reunite with The Warlord and Meng as The Faces of Pain in reference to their previous team names Faces of Fear and Powers of Pain. On 14 September, the team was eliminated from the tournament in the first round by Team ROH (Mike Bennett, Matt Jackson and Nick Jackson). Two days later, on the final day of the tournament, The Barbarian and The Warlord took part in a tag team gauntlet match, from which they eliminated their old WWF rivals, Demolition, before being eliminated themselves by 1-2-3 Kid and Marty Jannetty.

As of 2026, he still wrestles at 67 years old.

== Personal life ==
Sione has seven children with his wife, Seini Tonga. His youngest son, Peter, was a college football player, who signed with Brigham Young University in February 2005. However, in the early stages of his BYU contract, Peter withdrew in order to play closer to his home in Charlotte, North Carolina. Peter signed to attend Wingate University in Wingate, North Carolina. His son Joey competes in powerlifting and strongman events. Sione's nephew Samu Manoa is an American rugby union player who currently plays second row or back row for Toulon in France. Samu Manoa also plays for the US National Team. Sione's nephew Luke Kaumatule played TE/DE for Stanford University and nephew Canton Kaumatule played DE for Oregon University but transferred to the University of Central Florida to begin playing in the 2018 season. Both Luke and Canton are the younger brothers to Samu Monoa.

He is the uncle and trainer of Lei'D Tapa, who is a German professional women's wrestler, MMA fighter, and professional boxer.

In July 2016, Sione was named part of a class action lawsuit filed against WWE which alleged that wrestlers incurred traumatic brain injuries during their tenure and that the company concealed the risks of injury. The suit was litigated by attorney Konstantine Kyros, who has been involved in a number of other lawsuits against WWE. In September 2018, the lawsuit was dismissed by US District Judge Vanessa Lynne Bryant. In September 2020, an appeal for the lawsuit dismissed by a federal appeals court.

== Championships and accomplishments ==
- American Pro Wrestling Alliance
  - APWA World Heavyweight Championship (2 times)
  - APWA Triple Crown Championship (2 times)
  - APWA Tri State Championship (1 time)
  - APWA World Tag Team Championship (1 time) - with Warlord
- Appalachian Championship Wrestling
  - ACW Six Man Tag Team Championship (1 time) - with Heath and Principal Chad
- Bruiser Wrestling Federation
  - BWF Heavyweight Championship (1 time)
- Cauliflower Alley Club
  - Tag Team Award (2019) - with Haku
- Championship International Wrestling
  - CIW Hardcore Championship (1 time)
  - Tag Team Tournament (2004) - with Chainsaw, Nitro, The Barbarian and Demolition Ax
- Exodus Wrestling Alliance
  - EWA Heavyweight Championship (1 time)
- Gatineau Pro Wrestling
  - GPW Tag Team Championship (1 time) - with Warlord
- Indo-Asian Wrestling
  - Indo-Asian Heavyweight Championship (1 time)
- iGeneration Wrestling
  - iGeneration Heavyweight Championship (1 time)
- International Association of Wrestling
  - IAW Heavyweight Championship (1 time)
- Mainstream Wrestling Organization
  - MWO Heavyweight Championship (1 time)
- Mid-Atlantic Championship Wrestling / World Championship Wrestling
  - WCW United States Tag Team Championship (1 time, Last) - with Dick Slater
  - NWA World Six-Man Tag Team Championship (1 time) - with Ivan Koloff and The Warlord
- New England Pro Wrestling Hall of Fame
  - Class of 2013
- North Carolina Wrestling Association
  - NCWA Heavyweight Championship (1 time)
  - NCWA Tag Team Championship (1 time) - with Meng
- NWA Mid-Atlantic
  - NWA Mid-Atlantic Hardcore Championship (1 time)
  - NWA Mid-Atlantic Heritage Championship (1 time)
- NWA Virginia
  - NWA Virginia Heavyweight Championship (1 time)
- New Age Championship Wrestling
  - NACW Heavyweight Championship (1 time)
- Pro Wrestling Illustrated
  - Ranked No. 85 of the 500 best singles wrestlers in the PWI 500 in 1991
  - Ranked No. 97 of the 100 best tag teams during the "PWI Years" with The Warlord in 2003.
- Real Wrestling
  - Real Wrestling Heavyweight Championship (1 time)
- Superstars of Wrestling
  - SOW World Heavyweight Championship (1 time)
- SSW Entertainment
  - SSW Tag Team Championship (1 time) - with Meng
- Ultimate Championship Wrestling
  - UCW Heavyweight Championship (1 time)
- Universal Championship Wrestling
  - UCW American Heavyweight Championship (1 time)
  - UCW Hardcore Championship (4 times)
  - UCW Universal Tag Team Championship (1 time, inaugural) - with The Warlord
- Wildfire Championship Wrestling
  - Wildfire Heavyweight Championship (1 time)
- World League Wrestling
  - WLW Heavyweight Championship (1 time)
- World Wide Wrestling Alliance
  - WWWA Tag Team Championship (1 time) - with The Warlord
- World Wrestling Council
  - WWC Puerto Rico Heavyweight Championship (1 time)
- World Wrestling Federation

- Slammy Award for Best Etiquette (1994) shared with Fatu

- Asistencia, Administración y Asesoría
  - AAA Americas Heavyweight Championship (1 time)
- Wrestling Observer Newsletter awards
  - Worst Tag Team (1989) with The Warlord
  - Worst Worked Match of the Year (1996) with Ric Flair, Arn Anderson, Meng, Lex Luger, Kevin Sullivan, Z-Gangsta and The Ultimate Solution vs. Hulk Hogan and Randy Savage, WCW Uncensored, Towers of Doom match, Tupelo, MS, 24 March

== Sumo career record ==
Sachinoshima
Year	January Hatsu basho, Tokyo	March Haru basho, Osaka	May Natsu basho, Tokyo	July Nagoya basho, Nagoya	September Aki basho, Tokyo	November Kyūshū basho, Fukuoka
1975	x	(Maezumo)	East Jonokuchi #5; 5–2	East Jonidan #63; 4–1–2	East Jonidan #46; Sat out due to injury 0–0–7	West Jonidan #45; 5–2
1976	West Jonidan #13; 4–3	West Sandanme #76; Sat out due to injury 0–0–7	West Jonidan #30; 5–2	West Sandanme #83; 6–1	West Sandanme #36; Retired; 5–2	x
Record given as wins–losses–absences Top division champion Top division runner-up Retired Lower divisions Non-participation Sanshō key: F=Fighting spirit; O=Outstanding performance; T=Technique Also shown: ★=Kinboshi; P=Playoff(s); Divisions: Makuuchi — Jūryō — Makushita — Sandanme — Jonidan — Jonokuchi Makuuchi ranks: Yokozuna — Ōzeki — Sekiwake — Komusubi — Maegashira
