= History of World Championship Wrestling =

World Championship Wrestling
- Acronym: WCW
- Founded: October 11, 1988 (as WCW)
- Defunct: March 23–26, 2001 (WCW assets sold to the World Wrestling Federation); December 16, 2017 (Universal Wrestling Corporation merged into Turner Broadcasting System)
- Style: Professional wrestling Rasslin'; Sports entertainment
- Headquarters: Atlanta, Georgia
- Founder: Ted Turner
- Parent: Universal Wrestling Corporation: Turner Broadcasting System (1988–1996); Time Warner (1996–2017, as a legal entity); WCW, Inc.: WWE (WWE Libraries) (2001–present)
- Predecessor: Georgia Championship Wrestling; Jim Crockett Promotions
- Website: WCW on WWE.com

World Championship Wrestling (WCW) was an American professional wrestling promotion that existed from 1988 to 2001. It began as a promotion affiliated with the National Wrestling Alliance (NWA) that appeared on the national scene under the ownership of media mogul Ted Turner and based in Atlanta, Georgia. Prior to the launch of WCW as a separate promotion, the "World Championship Wrestling" name was used for a television program produced by NWA promotions Georgia Championship Wrestling (GCW) and Jim Crockett Promotions (JCP) on TBS; the name came from an Australian wrestling promotion of the 1970s.

In the 1990s, WCW, along with Vince McMahon's World Wrestling Federation (WWF; now known as World Wrestling Entertainment, or WWE), were the top two wrestling promotions in the United States. Its flagship show WCW Monday Nitro went head-to-head with WWF Raw is War in a ratings battle known as the Monday Night Wars. However, poorly-received storylines, the increasing popularity of the WWF's Attitude Era and content restrictions from Time Warner eventually led to WCW's decline and eventual acquisition of key assets by McMahon and WWE.

== Years prior to the Turner purchase (1980s) ==
=== Georgia Championship Wrestling and Black Saturday (1982–1984) ===
Although the "World Championship Wrestling" brand name was used by GCW partner Jim Barnett for his Australian promotion, the first promotion in the United States to use the brand on a wide scale was Georgia Championship Wrestling (GCW). GCW, owned primarily by Jack Brisco and Gerald Brisco and booked by Ole Anderson, was the first National Wrestling Alliance (NWA) territory to gain cable television access, broadcast by Ted Turner's WTBS-TV in Atlanta, the station that evolved into Superstation TBS. The show was broadcast every Saturday evening, from 6:05 PM EST to 8:05 PM EST, per the "Turner Time" scheduling format introduced in 1981.

After founding his own company, Titan Sports Inc., in 1980, Vince McMahon purchased his father's Capitol Wrestling Corporation in 1982 and merged it into Titan Sports Inc. to become the World Wrestling Federation (WWF; now World Wrestling Entertainment, or WWE). The WWF would leave the National Wrestling Alliance and launch the program WWF All American Wrestling on the USA Network. Meanwhile, GCW changed the name of its Georgia Championship Wrestling program to World Championship Wrestling, since it had begun broadcasting to a national audience via WTBS's satellite feed. This helped to keep GCW competitive against the WWF, as both promotions had secured television deals and the WWF was trying to become a national, as opposed to regional, entity.

On April 9, 1984, the Brisco brothers sold their shares in GCW, including their Saturday evening slot on WTBS, to McMahon. The WWF would take over GCW's timeslot on July 14, 1984, a day that would later be dubbed "Black Saturday". McMahon's gimmick-based approach, in contrast to GCW's more gritty and athleticism-driven Southern style of "rasslin'", was negatively received by WTBS viewers. Despite originally promising to produce live-to-tape in-studio matches from Atlanta, the WWF would instead feature pre-taped matches shot in arenas around the country. This move was a major factor in Turner's decision to discontinue showing the WWF. Anderson, who had refused to sell his shares in GCW to the WWF, teamed with fellow holdout shareholders Fred Ward and Ralph Freed to create Championship Wrestling from Georgia. Turner quickly secured a television deal with the new promotion, as well as with Bill Watts' Mid-South Wrestling based in Oklahoma.

=== Jim Crockett Promotions moves to WTBS (1985–1986) ===
In March 1985, under pressure from Turner, McMahon sold his WTBS timeslot and the "World Championship Wrestling" name to Jim Crockett Promotions (JCP), owned by Jim Crockett Jr., in a deal brokered by Barnett. The deal grew both companies, making JCP's Charlotte-based Mid-Atlantic Championship Wrestling into a national promotion that became synonymous with the NWA while providing McMahon and Titan Sports with capital needed to stage the first WrestleMania. The new World Championship Wrestling, which was now a combination of JCP and Championship Wrestling from Georgia, became a top rated show WTBS, allowing Crockett to become NWA president for the second time.

Influential wrestling magazine Pro Wrestling Illustrated and its sister publications thereafter habitually referred to JCP as "World Championship Wrestling", "WCW" and most commonly "the World Championship area" and continued to do so until early 1988, when it began referring to the company solely as the NWA, reasoning that "it has become apparent that the NWA and the World Championship area are one and the same."

In 1986, JCP held the first Jim Crockett Sr. Memorial Cup, which showcased talent from various NWA territories. Bob Geigel would later become the NWA president, and would purchase Geigel's Heart of America Sports Attractions, which owned the rights to promote wrestling shows through the states of Kansas, Missouri and Iowa. That year, United States Heavyweight Champion Nikita Koloff won a unification match against National Champion Wahoo McDaniel to combine the Mid Atlantic and Georgia territories' two respective top singles titles.

=== Going national (1987–1988) ===
In 1987, JCP would enter into an agreement to control Championship Wrestling from Florida (CWF), and Universal Wrestling Federation (UWF, which covered Oklahoma, Mississippi, Arkansas, Texas and Louisiana; by this time, the UWF had split from the NWA); this helped elevate Crockett to a third tenure as NWA President. The Florida and Mid-South territories (along with those companies' rosters of wrestlers) were absorbed into WCW. JCP now owned NWA St. Louis, thw CWF, the UWF, Mid-Atlantic, Central States Wrestling and Championship Wrestling from Georgia as well.

Between the purchasing of several NWA territories, World Class Championship Wrestling in Texas leaving the NWA in 1986 (and later merging with Jerry Jarrett's Continental Wrestling Association in Memphis to create a new promotion, the United States Wrestling Association), JCP was the last NWA member with national television exposure, which at this point in time made JCP de facto synonymous with the NWA. Although JCP and the NWA were still two separate legal entities, with Crockett as NWA president, JCP was allowed to use the NWA brand for promoting.

With the large amount of capital needed to take a wrestling promotion on a national tour, the various territorial acquisitions had drained JCP's coffers. Likewise, the WWF suffered a large debt load and its success hinged on the reception to its pay-per-view events. In 1987, JCP marketed the fifth installment of Starrcade as the NWA's answer to the WWF's WrestleMania event. The WWF would counter-program with their first Survivor Series event on the same day. The WWF informed cable companies that if they chose to carry Starrcade, they would not be allowed to carry future WWF events. The vast majority of companies showed Survivor Series (only five opted to remain in contract with JCP, resulting in only an $80,000 profit after expenses). In January 1988, JCP promoted Bunkhouse Stampede, to which McMahon counter-programmed with the first Royal Rumble. Both JCP events achieved low buyrates, and the decision to hold these events in Chicago and New York City alienated JCP's main fanbase in the Carolinas, hampering their drawing power for arena shows in the Southeast.

=== Dusty Rhodes as booker and collapse (1988) ===
In 1984, Crockett had signed Dusty Rhodes and made him booker for World Championship Wrestling. Rhodes had a reputation for creativity and authored many memorable feuds, storylines and gimmick matches like WarGames. Rhodes would be responsible for elevating up-and-coming wrestlers such as Koloff, Sting, Ricky Steamboat, Magnum T. A. and the Road Warriors (Hawk and Animal), among others, to superstardom. However, Rhodes would get involved in a political struggle with NWA champion Ric Flair, and by 1988, after four years of competition with McMahon, he was burned out.

Rhodes' booking would later be criticized for frequent non-endings to house shows, now known infamously as the "Dusty finish". One of the last creative aspects Rhodes initiated was the Clash of the Champions, on the night of WrestleMania IV. For a quarter-hour, the Ric Flair vs. Sting match gained more viewers than WrestleMania, and the match also saw Sting become a top player for WCW. Conversely, Rhodes planned at one point to have mid-card wrestler Rick Steiner defeat Flair in a five-minute match at Starrcade for the NWA World Heavyweight Championship. Rhodes would be fired by the promotion after an angle he booked on November 26, where Animal pulled a spike out of his shoulder pad and gouged Rhodes's eye, despite a strict "no-blood" policy laid down by Turner after his recent purchase of the company.

== Founding and first years under Ted Turner (1988–1992) ==
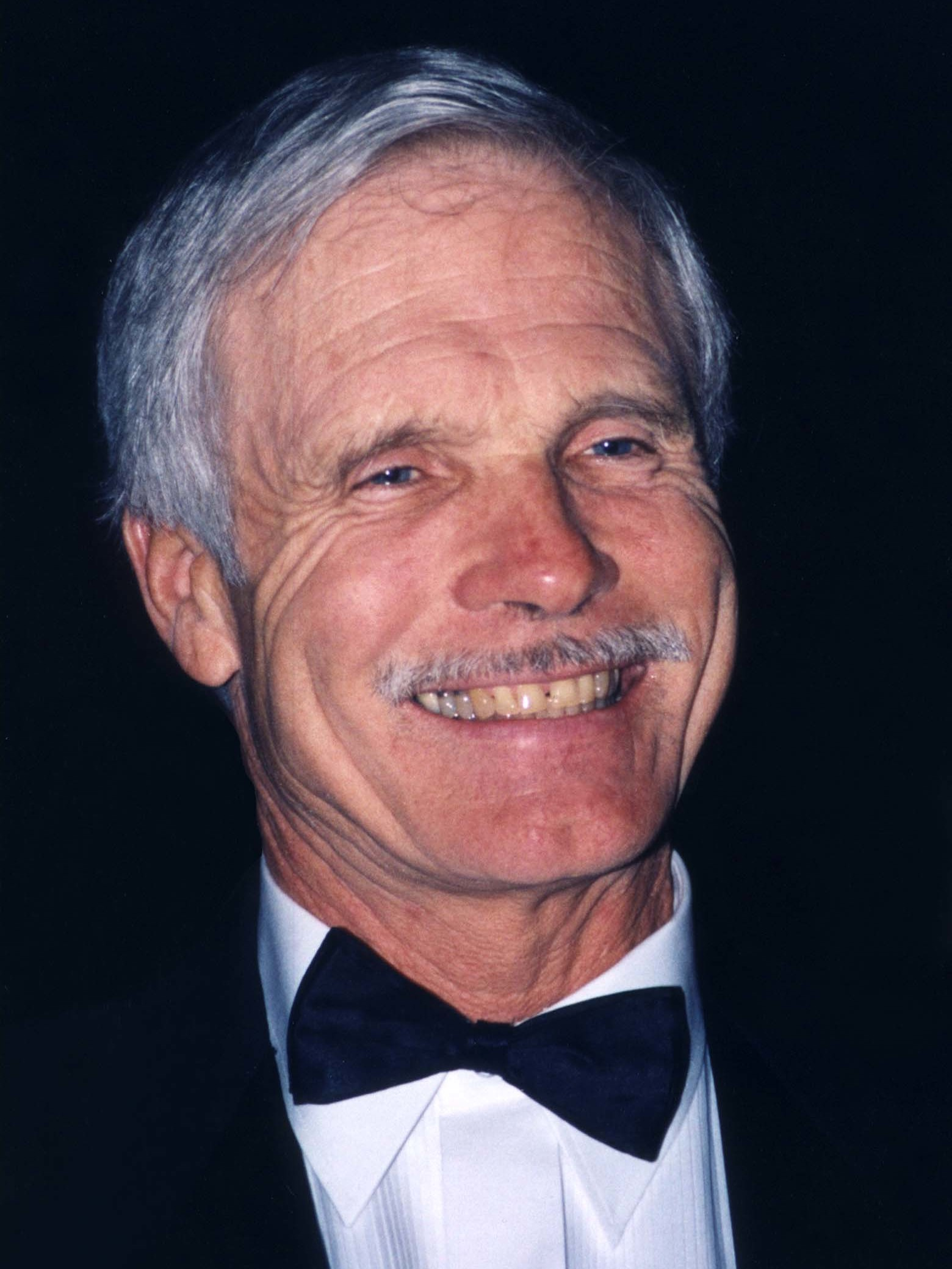
Ted Turner

JCP was purchased outright by Turner on October 11, 1988. Originally incorporated by Turner as the Universal Wrestling Corporation, Turner promised fans that WCW would maintain the athlete-oriented style of the NWA. The sale was completed on November 2, 1988, with a television taping of NWA World Championship Wrestling that very same date in Atlanta.

1989 proved to be a turnaround year for WCW, with Ric Flair as both World Champion and head booker. Flair would bring in Ricky Steamboat and Terry Funk, and his pay-per-view matches with Steamboat were financially and critically successful. Young stars such as the Road Warriors, Sting, Sid Vicious, Scott Steiner, Brian Pillman, The Great Muta and Lex Luger were given major storylines and championship opportunities. In March 1990, however, Flair would be fired as head booker after WCW talent began to argue that he was booking matches in his favor. One of these examples was Flair's refusal to drop the WCW World title to Luger, as he had already promised to drop it to Sting, who himself had been injured earlier in the year (and in so doing honor a promise originally made by Flair to Sting backstage after their match at Clash of the Champions I in 1988). Despite high ratings and well-received shows, Flair would be eventually replaced by Anderson as head booker.

Under Anderson, WCW began to gradually incorporate much of the gimmickry for which the WWF was better known. These stunts included a cross-promotional appearance of RoboCop at Capital Combat in May 1990, the Chamber of Horrors gimmick and the Black Scorpion storyline. House shows would drop to record lows as Anderson continuously pushed older wrestlers who were loyal to him. Behind the scenes, WCW was becoming more autonomous and slowly started separating itself from the NWA. They would officially split from the organization in January 1991, and began to recognize its own WCW World Heavyweight Championship and refer to the version of the NWA World Tag Team Championship it inherited from JCP as the WCW World Tag Team Championship.

Both WCW and the NWA recognized Flair as their World Heavyweight Champion throughout most of the first half of 1991. However, the recently installed WCW president Jim Herd, who was formerly the manager of St. Louis television station KPLR-TV and had also been a regional manager for Pizza Hut, turned against Flair for various reasons. Flair would be fired before The Great American Bash in July 1991 after failed contract negotiations. In the process, he was officially stripped of the WCW World Heavyweight Championship. According to Flair's autobiography, WCW refused to return the $25,000 deposit he had put down on the physical belt, so he kept it and brought it with him when he was hired by the WWF at the request of McMahon. Flair then incorporated the belt into his gimmick, dubbing himself "The Real World's Champion". WCW later renegotiated the use of the NWA name as a co-promotional gimmick with New Japan Pro-Wrestling and sued the WWF to stop showing Flair with the old NWA World Title belt on its programs, claiming a trademark on the physical design of the belt. The belt was returned to WCW by Flair when Herd was let go. Flair eventually received his deposit, which with interest was over $38,000. The title was brought back as the revived NWA World Heavyweight Championship.

Meanwhile, the WCW's product fell into a decline in 1991 under the presidency of Herd. Flair later stated that Herd "knew nothing about wrestling, other than the fact that the station he ran had a hot show" (referring to the once-popular show Wrestling at the Chase, which was broadcast by KPLR while Herd was manager there). According to Flair, Herd also wanted him to drop his "Nature Boy" persona, shave his head (even though Flair's bleach blonde hair was one of his most recognizable trademarks) and adopt a Roman gladiator gimmick in order to "change with the times". Creative committee member Kevin Sullivan was quoted as saying, "After we change Flair's gimmick, why don't we go to Yankee Stadium and change Babe Ruth's uniform number?" Herd's other ideas were seen by many as a poor attempt to mimic the WWF's gimmick-oriented style. Stan Hansen was so insulted by the Desperados gimmick (a stable of bumbling cowboys) that he left WCW when he was asked to be part of the group. Jim Cornette, Stan Lane and the Road Warriors would also depart from the promotion after conflicts with Herd.

Herd was fired in January 1992 and was succeeded by Kip Allen Frey. Frey's tenure running WCW was brief, and he would be replaced later in the year by Bill Watts, who had formerly been the promoter for the UWF and was the first head executive of WCW to have prior experience in the wrestling business since Crockett had left. Watts would controversially make top rope moves – which were commonly performed by stars such as Pillman and the Steiner brothers – illegal during wrestling matches among other changes. After clashes with management over a number of issues, as well as accusations of bigotry from Hank Aaron, Paul E. Dangerously (Paul Heyman) and Scotty Flamingo, Watts resigned. He was subsequently replaced by Eric Bischoff.

== Final split with the National Wrestling Alliance (1993) ==
During the period that WCW operated with its own World Heavyweight Championship, while also recognizing the NWA's world title, Flair left the WWF on good terms and returned to WCW, regaining the NWA title from Barry Windham in July 1993. The title was later scheduled to be dropped by Flair to Rick Rude, a change which was publicly exposed by the pre-taping of matches at the Disney-MGM Studios, known as the Disney tapings. The NWA board of directors, working separately from WCW, objected to the title being changed without their vote; WCW subsequently left the NWA for good in September 1993. WCW still legally owned and used the actual belt which represented the NWA World Heavyweight Championship, however, and Rude even defended it as the "Big Gold Belt", but they could no longer use the NWA name. The title thus became known as the WCW International World Heavyweight Championship, sanctioned by fictitious subsidiary WCW International. WCW claimed that WCW International still recognized the belt as a legitimate World Championship. For a short while, there were essentially two world titles up for competition in the organization, with Sting winning the WCW International title, while Flair captured the WCW World Heavyweight Championship from Big Van Vader. The two titles were unified by Flair in a match on June 23, 1994.

== Eric Bischoff era (1993–1998) ==
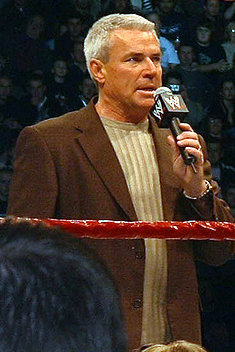
Eric Bischoff

=== First year under Bischoff (1993) ===
In February 1993, former commentator Eric Bischoff was appointed as executive vice president of WCW. Bischoff impressed Turner's top brass with his non-confrontational tactics and business savvy. Jim Ross, upset that a man who once answered to him was now his supervisor, requested and received a release from TBS executive Bill Shaw (after suggestion from Bischoff) and ended up in the WWF. Meanwhile, Rhodes and Anderson retained creative control, and WCW continued its decline under their watch.

The infamous "Lost in Cleveland" storyline began when Cactus Jack (Mick Foley) first wrestled Vader on April 6, 1993. Foley and Vader wanted an intense match, so they agreed that Vader would hit Cactus with a series of heavy blows to the face. WCW edited the match heavily because it was against their policies to show the heavy bleeding that resulted. Foley suffered a broken nose, a dislocated jaw and needed twenty-seven stitches, but won the match via countout. Because the title did not change hands on a countout, WCW booked a rematch. Foley, however, wanted some time off to be with his newborn daughter and get surgery to repair a knee injury. As a result, in the rematch with Vader on April 23, Vader removed the protective mats at ringside and power-bombed Foley onto the exposed concrete floor, causing a legitimate concussion and causing Foley to temporarily lose sensation in his left foot and hand. While Foley was away, the angle explained Cactus Jack's as him being was institutionalized, escaped and developed amnesia. Foley had wanted the injury storyline to be very serious and generate genuine sympathy for him before his return. In response to the comedy vignettes that WCW produced, Foley jokes in his autobiography that they were the brainchild of WCW executives, who regarded a surefire moneymaking feud as a problem that needed to be solved.

On July 6, 1993, WCW began the aforementioned Disney tapings. In order to save money, the promotion rented out a studio located at the Disney-MGM Studios in Orlando, Florida, and proceeded to tape its syndicated television programming months before it was to air. Wrestlers were often forced to appear on-camera with belts they would not actually win for several more months, exposing future WCW storylines to those in attendance (most of whom were tourists who had been coached to cheer and boo on cue). Footage of Rude with the NWA title shot at these tapings had caused the controversy with the NWA discussed above. Moreover, the tapings also caused confusion in the tag team division, as they had revealed that Arn Anderson and Paul Roma were to win the WCW World tag team titles from The Hollywood Blonds (Pillman and "Stunning" Steve Austin). The promotion attempted to swerve the fans at the live Beach Blast pay-per-view event and keep the titles on the Blonds, but the live Clash of the Champions XXIV show was to take place in August before the already-shot footage of Anderson and Roma as tag team champions was to begin circulating in late-August. However, before the Clash event, Pillman was injured and unable to wrestle, forcing Lord Steven Regal to replace him alongside Austin. Anderson and Roma won the titles, while the Blonds were broken up permanently.

In 1993, Flair returned to WCW but was constrained by a no-compete clause from his WWF contract. In response, he was given a talk show segment on WCW programming called "A Flair for the Gold," similar to the "Piper's Pit" segments starring Roddy Piper. In a now-infamous segment at the Clash of the Champions XXIV, a "mystery partner" for the faces known as the Shockmaster]] (portrayed by Fred Ottman) tripped through the wall and fell on his face, inadvertently rendering himself a joke character (despite winning some matches). Rhodes later claimed that a 2x4 was placed on the bottom of the wall, which had not been there on rehearsal, which caused Ottman to stumble. By November 1993, WCW decided to once again base the promotion around Flair after prospective top babyface Sid Vicious was fired following in an incident with Arn Anderson in England that resulted in the hospitalization of both men. Flair then placed his career on the line against Big Van Vader for the WCW World Heavyweight Championship. He won the title at Starrcade and was once again made booker. However, that did not stop WCW from suffering $23 million in losses for 1993.

=== Early competition with the World Wrestling Federation (1994–1996) ===
Beginning in 1994, Bischoff aggressively recruited high-profile former stars from the WWF, such as Hulk Hogan and Randy Savage, using Turner's monetary resources. Due to their high profiles, Hogan and Savage were able to demand concessions, such as multi-year, multimillion-dollar contracts and creative control over their characters. This would later become a problem for WCW, as other wrestlers were able to make similar demands and contract values soared. Hogan in particular was able to gain considerable influence through a friendship with Bischoff; including a fee of $700,000 per pay-per-view appearance, plus 25% of the gross revenue from the pay-per-view whether it was successful or not.

WCW's first major pay-per-view event involving Hogan was Bash at the Beach, saw the former WWF mainstay defeat Flair for the WCW World Heavyweight Championship. During their time in WWF from 1991 to 1992, a feud was teased between them, but a match originally planned for WrestleMania VIII never came to fruition. WCW's event drew a high buyrate due to mainstream intrigue and hype. In December 1994, Savage would make his WCW debut; and in 1995, a new pay-per-view event called Uncensored was created. The promotion would also revive The Great American Bash, which had not aired since 1992.

In a 1995 meeting, Turner asked Bischoff how WCW could compete with the WWF. Bischoff, not expecting Turner to comply, said that the only way would be a prime-time program on a weekday night, possibly up against the WWF's flagship show, Monday Night Raw on USA Network. In response, Turner granted him a live hour on TNT every Monday night. The new weekly show, WCW Monday Nitro, debuted on September 4, 1995, live from the Mall of America in Bloomington, Minnesota, in a timeslot that specifically overlapped with Raw. Bischoff himself was initially the host, alongside Bobby Heenan and ex-NFL star Steve McMichael. The initial broadcast of Nitro featured the surprise return of Luger (who had been in the WWF since 1993) to the WCW audience. Because Nitro was live at the time, premiering major stars on the show would signal to the fans the amount of excitement the broadcasts would contain. Luger himself had come off a successful run in the WWF, and became one of the company's top stars. Luger had been employed with the WWF as recently as a week before his Nitro appearance, and had wrestled on a WWF house show in Halifax, Nova Scotia, the night before. The significance of this event would lead to the beginning of a period that would be known as the "Monday Night Wars".

Nitro was successful enough that it was expanded to two live hours in May 1996, and later three in February 1998. Early on, Bischoff would give away Raw results on Nitro, as Raw, unlike Nitro, was then mostly taped in advance. Another famous jab at the WWF was taken on December 18, 1995, when the reigning WWF Women's Champion Debrah Miceli (who had previously competed in WCW as "Madusa") returned to the promotion as her WWF character Alundra Blayze and, live on Nitro, denounced the Blayze character and threw the WWF Women's title belt in a trash can, reclaiming her "Madusa" moniker in the process. In response, the WWF created the "Billionaire Ted" skits, which featured parodies of Turner ("Billionaire Ted"), Hogan ("The Huckster"), Savage ("The Nacho Man") and WCW interviewer Gene Okerlund ("Scheme Gene"). Turner would later state that he was not offended by the skits, and instead found them funny.

=== New World Order and ratings dominance (1996–1998) ===
On Memorial Day 1996, Scott Hall, who had wrestled in the WWF as Razor Ramon, interrupted a match by walking down through the crowd into the ring. He then delivered his "You want a war?" speech: "You people know who I am," he began, "but you don't know why I'm here." Hall said that he and two of his associates were going to "take over." Many thought he meant Bret Hart and Shawn Michaels, then still with the WWF. Hall challenged the best WCW wrestlers to stand up and defend the company against their onslaught. The next week, Hall reappeared on Nitro to pester the WCW announcers before Sting confronted him and slaped Hall across the face. In response, Hall promised Sting a "big surprise" the following week in Wheeling, West Virginia, which ended up being Hall's friend and former WWF Champion Kevin Nash. Nash delivered his own speech, referring to WCW's slogan of "Where The Big Boys Play" with the response, "We didn't come here to play," and warning that, "The measuring stick just changed here...you're looking at it." In the weeks following, Hall and Nash were collectively referred to as "The Outsiders." Both men took to showing up unexpectedly during Nitro broadcasts, distracting and attacking distracting wrestlers and causing various disruptions.

The WWF would later file a lawsuit, alleging that the storyline implied that Hall and Nash were invaders sent by McMahon to destroy WCW. The WWF also claimed Hall acted in a manner too similar to the Razor Ramon character which was owned by the WWF. At The Great American Bash, Nash confirmed on camera that the Outsiders were not employed by the WWF. Despite this, the lawsuit dragged on for several years before being settled out of court. One of the settlement's terms was the right for the WWF to bid on WCW's properties, should they ever be up for liquidation.

Eventually, the Outsiders announced the forthcoming appearance of a third member. At Bash at the Beach, Hall and Nash were scheduled to team with their mystery partner against Luger, Savage and Sting. Hogan came to the ring in the climax of the match and leg dropped Savage, revealing himself to be the Outsiders' third man. Giving an interview with Okerlund directly after the match, Hogan claimed the reason for the turn was that he was tired of fans that had turned on him. Hogan referred to himself and the Outsiders as a "new world organization of wrestling". The New World Order (nWo) would subsequently begin feuds with wrestlers loyal to WCW.

According to Bischoff, the original plan was to have Sting be revealed as the third man rather than Hogan. Hogan convinced Bischoff to make him the third man instead, with the reasoning that the third man needed to have WWF name value, much like Hall and Nash did, and because of Hogan's success as the face of the WWF in the 1980s and early 1990s. Hogan's heel turn marked the first time in over fifteen years that he portrayed a villainous character.

With most of the WCW roster over in Japan, the nWo took over the September 23, 1996, episode of Nitro, including the broadcast booth and the ring announcer's role. Largely due to the nWo angle, Nitro would go on to beat Raw for eighty-four consecutive weeks in the ratings.

==== Road to Starrcade 1997 and subsequent controversy (1997) ====
In 1997, the nWo began feuding with the revived babyface Four Horsemen as well as the returning Sting. Following a lengthy absence, Sting returned to WCW television as a darker, brooding character, in a gimmick based on The Crow (1994). Sting would be in the rafters of WCW arenas, and sometimes rappel down into the ring to help WCW wrestlers fight the nWo. This latter feud served to build up Starrcade in December, headlined by Sting facing Hogan for the WCW World Heavyweight Championship. Culminating a fifteen-month storyline, the event drew WCW's largest-ever buyrate.

Retrospective reviewers considered 1997 to be WCW's peak year. However, that year's Starrcade event was heavily criticized and created much controversy for not having a clean finish to the WCW World Heavyweight Championship match. A recently introduced Bret Hart, who had refereed the preceding match between Bischoff and Larry Zbyszko for control of Nitro, alleged that referee Nick Patrick had performed a fast three-count on Sting and wanted to "make things right". Hart insisted that the match continue with himself as referee, in order to prevent Sting from being "screwed" like Hart had legitimately been at the 1997 Survivor Series the month prior; an incident that came at the end of his run with the WWF. Bischoff himself would admit in his memoir Controversy Creates Cash that the three-count looked like a normal count, and replays of the three-count on later shows had the video sped up to hide this. Because of this, Starrcade has also been seen by critics as the beginning of the end for WCW.

According to Hart, WCW failed to capitalize on his talent and momentum, and had no idea how to properly utilize him. Bischoff contends that the Montreal Screwjob "...had taken his toll on him," in his autobiography. "It was all he talked about... constantly."

== Decline (1998–2000) ==
=== Start of the decline (1998–1999) ===
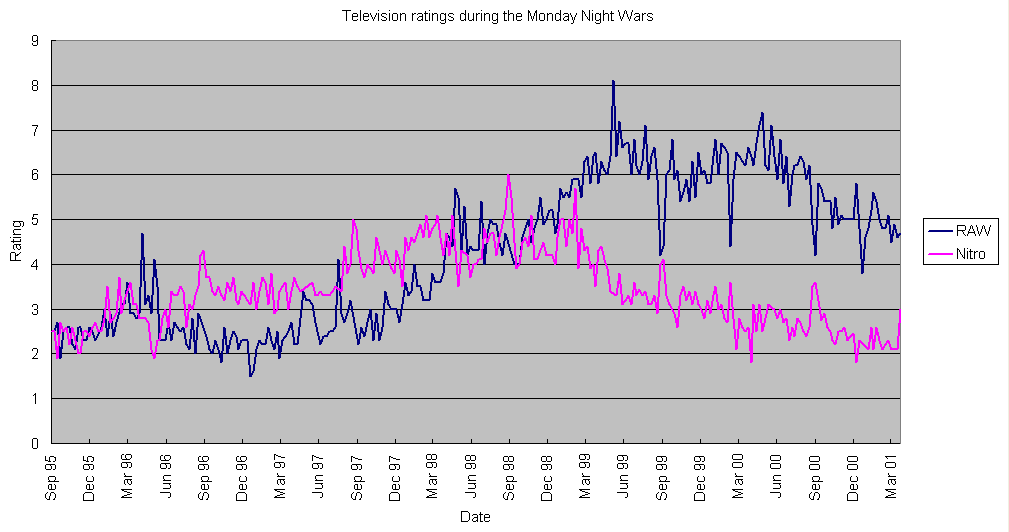
A television ratings comparison for the period of the Monday Night Wars

1998 saw WCW slide into a period of creative decline, leading to a loss of viewership. The promotion was criticized for their overuse of celebrities in pay-per-view matches, such as Dennis Rodman and Jay Leno, and frequent product placement, such as Rick Steiner trading barbs with Chucky in a segment promoting the film Bride of Chucky. Turner Broadcasting sought to capitalize on WCW's previous momentum by launching a new Thursday night show on TBS called Thunder.

In the aftermath of Starrcade 1997, Sting was stripped of the WCW World Heavyweight Championship on the debut episode of Thunder on January 8, 1998; Hogan and Sting would face each other again for the vacant championship at SuperBrawl VIII the following month. Sting's presence on the main card would soon begin to fade, and his drawing power would also decrease. Meanwhile, dissension within the nWo led to the group splitting into the Hogan-led heel nWo Hollywood faction and the opposing, Nash-led, face nWo Wolfpac faction. Meanwhile, the WWF revamped its creative approach under the "WWF Attitude" moniker, elevating stars like Stone Cold Steve Austin, The Rock, Triple H and his DX group, Mankind and Kane. Austin's feud with McMahon's heel character, "Mr. McMahon", led to the April 13, 1998, episode of Raw, headlined by a match between Austin and McMahon, beating Nitro in the ratings for the first time in eighty-four weeks.

WCW was well known for having popular, young midcard stars; such as Chris Jericho, Eddie Guerrero, Chris Benoit, Dean Malenko, Raven, Billy Kidman, Chavo Guerrero Jr., Perry Saturn, Booker T and Rey Mysterio. They were also credited for their cruiserweight division featuring high-flying stars from Mexico and Japan, where the style of wrestling was popularized. In spite of this, WCW did not promote its younger stars to the top slots (a charge admitted by Bischoff) and were kept away from the main event scene, yet WCW's top-level stars had no motivation to perform due to their long-term contracts. Out of the younger talent listed, many of its stars would become main event-level world champions in the WWF/E several years later after WCW's demise.

Talents were reportedly signed to keep them from appearing on WWF television. Bischoff recruited former WWF star The Ultimate Warrior to feud with Hogan and capitalize on the Hogan/Warrior match at WrestleMania VI. Their October 1998 rematch at Halloween Havoc was considered as one of the worst matches in pay-per-view history, and interest soon dissipated after several unrealistic segments involving the two were aired on WCW programming. Warrior also insisted on elaborate and costly apparatuses, such as a trapdoor in the ring which badly injured The British Bulldog when he landed on it awkwardly earlier in the event. Warrior would disappear from WCW programming shortly afterwards.

Ex-NFL player Bill Goldberg was portrayed as an invincible monster with a long winning streak of squash matches. One of Nitro's rating wins was on July 6, 1998, when Goldberg defeated Hogan to win the WCW world title at Georgia Dome in Atlanta. Despite strong ratings, the decision to air the Goldberg-Hogan title match on television, rather than pay-per-view, was scrutinized.

The September 14, 1998, episode of Nitro would also drew strong ratings due to Flair's return to WCW to reform the Four Horsemen; Flair had been absent for a brief period prior to this due to legitimate conflicts with Bischoff. Nitro ended the night with a 4.5 rating, as opposed to the 4.0 rating attained by Raw. Conversely, WCW would take another hit when their Halloween Havoc event, held on October 25, 1998, ran longer than the time allocated. Because of the last-minute addition of a tag team title match between Scott Steiner]and The Giant against Rick Steiner and Buff Bagwell, several thousand viewers lost the pay-per-view feed at 11pm during the world title match between Goldberg and Diamond Dallas Page. The following night, the entire match would air for free on Nitro, leading to the program winning in the ratings for the final time.

According to Bischoff's autobiography Controversy Creates Cash, Time Warner (who bought Turner Broadcasting in 1996) increasingly micromanaged WCW, severely hindering (and occasionally overriding) Bischoff's control of the company. Time Warner initially gave him slight content restrictions as to what he was and was not allowed to do with WCW, but these restrictions mounted as time passed. By the summer of 1998, he was outright ordered to tilt WCW's programming to a more "family-friendly" output. This forced shift came while the WWF, buoyed by the "Attitude" era, was regularly beating WCW in the ratings. Like other companies under Time Warner ownership, WCW was forced to slash their budget, putting even more strain on the promotion. Bischoff maintains that the restrictions and mandates placed on WCW was done because many executives in Time Warner leadership — from the Turner Broadcasting era – hated professional wrestling and wanted to remove WCW entirely.

At Starrcade, Nash, who was appointed WCW's head booker, set himself up to defeat Goldberg for the world title. In the climax, Hall ran into the arena and tased Goldberg with a cattle prod, enabling Nash to pick up the win, end Goldberg's streak and become the champion. The main event finish was universally panned by critics. On the January 4, 1999, episode of Nitro, a Starrcade rematch between Nash and Goldberg was booked. However, Goldberg was kayfabe arrested by police for stalking Miss Elizabeth and was replaced by the returning Hogan, who had been absent from WCW for several months prior after he claimed to retire from wrestling. Prior to the match, play-by-play announcer Tony Schiavone, under direction from Bischoff, revealed that Foley, portraying his "Mankind" character, would be win the WWF Championship on a taped edition of Raw, sarcastically saying, "Huh, that's gonna put some butts in the seats". Foley had worked for WCW but left in 1994 after deciding Bischoff would never give him a prominent role in the company. Nielsen ratings indicated that over 300,000 households changed the channel to watch Foley's victory.

The Nitro main event saw Hogan poke Nash in the chest. Nash oversold the poke by forcefully falling to the mat and allowing Hogan to pin him for the WCW World Heavyweight Championship. This effectively united the two separate nWo factions into a new faction, the nWo Elite. Goldberg made his way down to the ring along with Luger during the celebration, only for Luger to blindside the former and Hall to taser him again. The segment became infamously known as the "Fingerpoke of Doom", with critics and retrospective reviewers condemning WCW for their bait-and-switch tactics which ultimately damaged the credibility of the company as a whole.

By late 1999, WCW began losing around $5 million a month as attendance, pay-per-view buys and ratings were down significantly. Failed angles and gimmicks during this time included a push for the 1970s rock group Kiss, a storyline involving rapper Master P and The No Limit Soldiers and a failed contest to find a new member of the Nitro Girls.

Kiss had collaborated with WCW to promote The Demon, a gimmick created in the band's image originally portrayed by Brian Adams and then by Dale Torborg. As a way of introducing The Demon, Kiss closed out an episode of Nitro with a live performance of their hit song "God of Thunder", during which The Demon made his debut. The segment was one of lowest-rated in the history of Nitro, and the Demon character quickly lost its momentum. As part of the deal with Kiss, The Demon was contractually obligated to receive a main-event match on a pay-per-view, a stipulation WCW fulfilled by having him lose to midcard wrestler The Wall in under four minutes at SuperBrawl 2000. Meanwhile, the hip hop music-inspired No Limit Soldiers were introduced as part of a music-themed angle, pitting them against the country music-themed stable The West Texas Rednecks. Despite the fact that the No Limit Soldiers were presented as babyfaces, WCW's mostly Southern audience rejected them and cheered the villainous, rap-hating West Texas Rednecks instead.

Harvey Schiller, who served as the president of Turner Sports at the time and acted as Bischoff's superior, had Bischoff removed from control of WCW on September 10, 1999. With Bischoff's removal, an announced "million-dollar contest" was later cancelled, a planned Nitro animated series was scrapped and the Road Wild pay-per-view event (a Bischoff creation) would also be discontinued.

=== Vince Russo era (1999–2000) ===
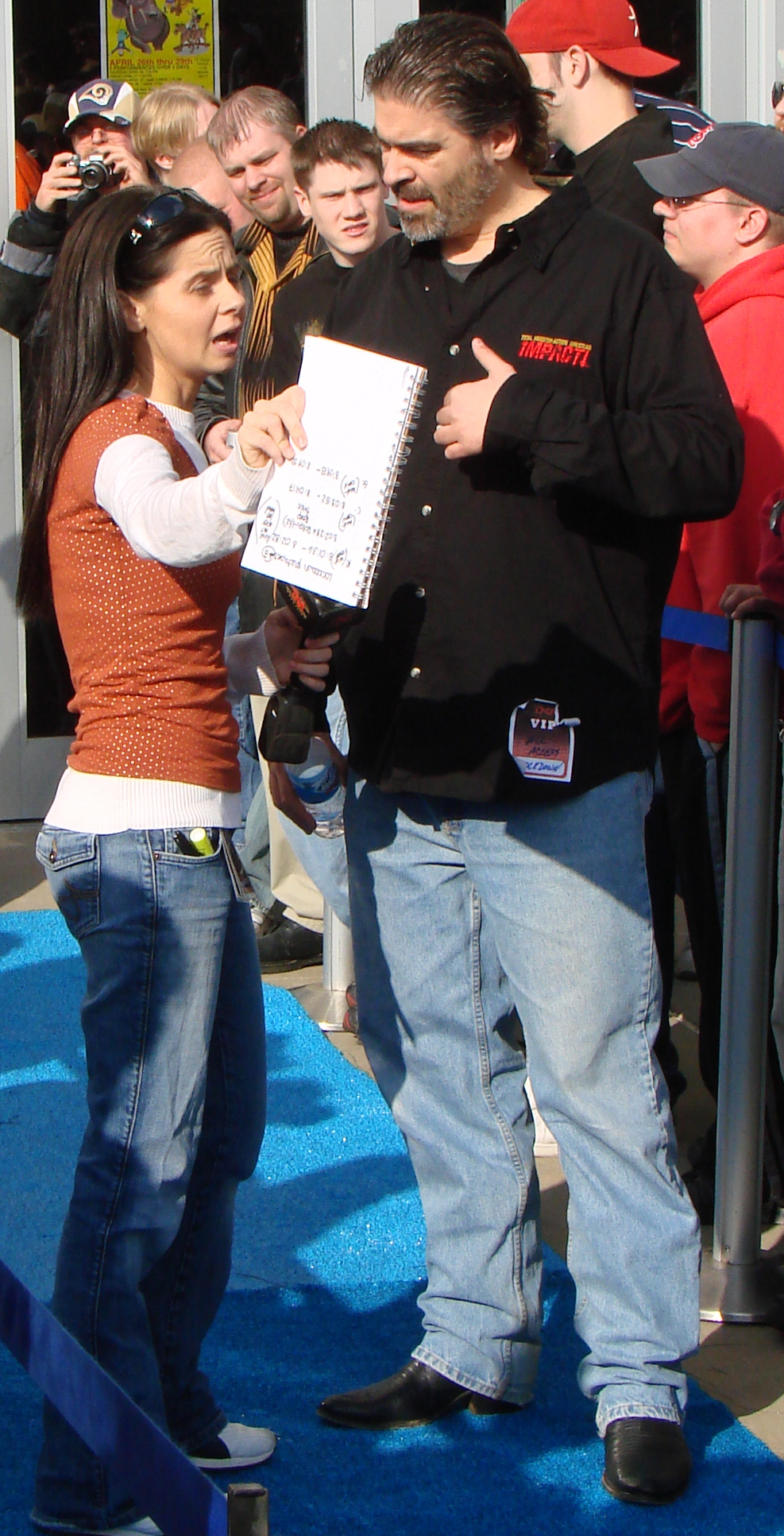
Vince Russo (right)

Bischoff was replaced by then-WCW Vice President of Strategic Planning Bill Busch, who was named senior vice president. Busch in turn would bring in former WWF head writer Vince Russo and his colleague, Ed Ferrara. Russo and Ferrera presented themselves as the brains behind the "Attitude Era", and were offered lucrative contracts to come to WCW in October 1999. Russo and Ferrara tried to replicate the same writing format (known as "Crash TV") they had used in the WWF, but at a more accelerated pace, and would also push the younger talents to phase out the aging stars.

Russo and Ferrara struggled to gain approval for some of their ideas from WCW management, such as a "Piñata on a Pole" match between Mexican wrestlers on November 15. In late 1999, Russo and Ferrera revived the nWo as the nWo 2000, this time with Hart and Jeff Jarrett at the helm. They next targeted WWF announcer Jim Ross with a parody character called "Oklahoma," who was played onscreen by Ferrara and would go on to win the WCW Cruiserweight Championship. Ross suffered from Bell's palsy, and the character lampooned his resultant facial defects. The gimmick was very poorly received by many within the wrestling community, claiming that the character was in bad taste (and even sparking a legitimate feud between Ferrara and Cornette, one of Ross' close friends). Russo himself became an on-screen character whose face was never shown on camera; only his hand and the back of his chair were ever actually seen. This became part of a recurring theme as "worked shoots" became regular occurrences on WCW programming as a way of blurring the lines between what was legitimate and what was not.

In December 1999, Hart suffered a career-ending concussion during a match with Goldberg. Goldberg himself would slice open a major artery in his forearm less than a week later while punching through a limousine window in Salisbury, Maryland, as part of a storyline that was written by Russo. Russo and Ferrara were suspended three months later amid rumors that they wanted to make former UFC fighter Tank Abbott the WCW World Heavyweight Champion. Abbott, despite his legitimate fighting background, had little wrestling experience and had failed to connect with WCW audiences. Kevin Sullivan, who had been on and off as a booker over the course of several years, was appointed as the new head writer in the interim.

The new writing team attempted to appease fans by having Benoit win the WCW World Heavyweight Championship at Souled Out in January 2000. However, Benoit was among a group of wrestlers who expressed their intent to leave WCW prior to the show because Sullivan was not particularly fond of them. Benoit, in particular, had a personal grievance with Sullivan dating back several months as a storyline with the two that involved Benoit winning the services of Sullivan's manager, Woman (Sullivan's then-wife Nancy), led to an extramarital affair that resulted in a real life relationship developing between Benoit and Woman. Guerrero, Malenko and Saturn, among several others, voiced their grievances to Busch, who initially agreed to take Sullivan off Nitro and Thunder, only to turn around and tell them they were all being sent home except Benoit. In retaliation, Benoit handed the belt back after winning it and he, along with Guerrero, Malenko and Saturn, signed with the WWF the next day; becoming popularly known as "The Radicalz". As a result, Busch was fired as senior vice president and replaced by Turner programming executive Brad Siegel.

On February 11, 2000, twelve wrestlers, including African American wrestler Hardbody Harrison and Japanese-American manager Sonny Onoo, launched racial discrimination lawsuits against WCW, charging that, as a result of their ethnicities, they had not been pushed, had not been paid as well as other wrestlers and personalities and had been given offensive gimmicks. It has since been speculated that these charges led to Booker T, himself an African American, winning the WCW World Heavyweight Championship later that year, and his real-life brother Stevie Ray being made a color commentator; Stevie Ray himself acknowledged that it may have been a factor. Onoo claimed that he had been given a disrespectful gimmick and that his final salary—US$160,000—was only half of the average pay for a WCW wrestler at that time.

== Final year (2000–2001) ==
=== Continued decline (2000–2001) ===
In April 2000, with ratings hitting new lows, Russo and Bischoff were reinstated by WCW. In another attempt to get WCW's creative product turned around, they decided to "reboot" WCW into a more modern, streamlined company. All angles taking place at the time were immediately dropped and all championships were vacated.

The first major storyline to take place following the reboot saw Russo and Bischoff form an on-screen union that stood up for the younger talent in the company (dubbed the New Blood) in their battle against the Millionaire's Club, which consisted of the older, higher-paid and more visible stars such as Hogan, Sting and Page. Though initially well received, reception to the storyline quickly declined when the New Blood were cast as heels against the face Millionaire's Club. Many saw the casting as an attempt to gain sympathy towards the veterans in spite of the already bad reputations they had gained behind the scenes. The New Blood was disbanded before their eponymous pay-per-view event, New Blood Rising.

Although neither was a trained wrestler, both Russo and actor David Arquette each won the WCW World Heavyweight Championship, the latter in order to promote the film Ready to Rumble. Arquette was vehemently against winning the championship, believing that fans, like himself, would detest a non-wrestler winning the title as neither looked physically capable of defeating actual wrestlers in a match. In WWE's The Rise and Fall of WCW documentary, Ross said that Arquette winning the championship was a "farce" and an "embarrassment", and David Crockett, the brother of Jim Crockett Jr. who worked as one of WCW's backstage producers, said that WCW might as well "throw [the title] in the trash can".

Goldberg turned heel for the first time in his career at The Great American Bash, but his subsequent feud with Nash, and a failed attempt to duplicate his original streak, greatly diminished Goldberg's drawing power.

Russo had many behind-the-scenes conflicts with Hogan, as he still believed that Hogan's time in the spotlight was over. Hogan was viewed as "jobber to the stars", losing to main-event wrestlers such as Sting and Goldberg, as well as to Billy Kidman, whom Russo had Hogan feud with in an attempt to elevate Kidman. Hogan also appeared less frequently on WCW programming during this time. When it was announced that Hogan would be facing Jarrett for the WCW World Heavyweight Championship at Bash at the Beach, Hogan invoked his creative control and demanded that he win the match and the title. Russo agreed to the finish, but added that the finish would involve Jarrett simply laying down for Hogan to pin him, which Hogan strongly disagreed with.

During the actual match, Russo came down to the ring and threw the title belt at Hogan's feet. Hogan broke character, infamously saying, "Is this your idea, Russo? That's why this company is in the damn shape it's in, because of bullshit like this!" Moments after Hogan had left the arena, Russo came back outand immediately voided Hogan's title win before delivering a shoot speech aimed at Hogan, during which he referred to Hogan as a "piece of shit" and that the fans would "never see [him] again", effectively firing Hogan live on pay-per-view. This act eventually led to Hogan filing a defamation of character lawsuit, which was dismissed in 2002.

Infuriated by Russo's actions, which conflicted with his intentions for Bash at the Beach, Bischoff departed once more in July 2000. At the New Blood Rising pay-per-view on August 13, an injured Goldberg walked out of a triple threat elimination contest against Nash and Scott Steiner, violating the script of the match, and leaving Steiner to wrestle and lose to Nash by himself. Goldberg then swore at Russo on his way back to the dressing room on-camera. As a result of Goldberg's actions, the storyline was changed to a rivalry between Steiner and Goldberg, culminating in a match at Fall Brawl in September 2000, which Steiner won. Immediately afterward, Russo informed Goldberg that if he ever lost another match, he would be released from his WCW contract. However, this proved an opportunity for Goldberg to heal from previous injuries and Russo was gone from WCW entirely by late 2000, leaving former All Japan Pro Wrestling star Johnny Ace to replace him. During this time, a short-lived crossover feud began involving stars of WCW and Battle Dome.

At the Sin pay-per-view on January 14, 2001, Goldberg and his trainer DeWayne Bruce lost a tag team match to Totally Buffed (Buff Bagwell and The Total Package). This was Goldberg's final appearance for WCW before the company was purchased by the WWF. The final WCW event to be held outside the southern United States was the January 29 edition of WCW Monday Nitro from Baltimore, Maryland, and its associated taping of Thunder (which took place the same night). Following this, all remaining WCW events were held in the southern United States. In addition, most female personalities were released from WCW by the beginning of February 2001 in an attempt to cut costs.

==== Attempted Bischoff/Fusient purchase (2001) ====
By 2001, WCW was losing between $12 million–$17 million a year (and $60 million in 2000 alone). When America Online (AOL) merged with Time Warner to form AOL Time Warner, Ted Turner was effectively forced out. AOL Time Warner looked to sell WCW and a sale nearly occurred in early 2001 to Bischoff and a group of private investors, calling themselves Fusient Media Ventures, with news reports and Bischoff himself declaring a deal was in place. However, new Turner networks head Jamie Kellner formally cancelled all WCW programming from its television networks. As Fusient's offer depended on being able to continue to air WCW programming on the Turner networks, the deal fell through. Kellner believed that wrestling did not fit the demographics of either TBS or TNT and would not be favorable enough to get the "right" advertisers to buy airtime, even though Thunder was the highest-rated show on TBS at the time.

In the book NITRO: The Incredible Rise and Inevitable Collapse of Ted Turner's WCW by Guy Evans, it is stated that a key condition in WCW's purchase deal with Fusient was that Fusient wanted control over time slots on TNT and TBS, regardless of whether these slots would show WCW programming or not. This influenced Kellner's decision to ultimately cancel WCW programming. WCW's losses were then written-off via purchase accounting; according to Evans: "in the post-merger environment, the new conglomerate was able to 'write down' money losing operations, essentially eliminating those losses because of their irrelevancy moving forward."

== Acquisition by WWF and aftermath (2001–2017) ==
On March 23, 2001, all of WCW's trademarks and archived video library, as well as a select twenty-four contracts, were sold to McMahon and the WWF. The company's intangible properties were purchased for US$3 million. Most of the main event-level stars, including Flair, Goldberg, Nash and Sting, were contracted directly to AOL Time Warner instead of WCW, and thus the former parent company was forced to continue to pay many of them for years afterward. The company's legal name reverted to Universal Wrestling Corporation.

TNT aired the final Nitro episode from Panama City Beach, Florida, which had been scheduled for the following Monday on March 26. McMahon opened the last-ever episode of Nitro with a simulcast with Raw, which aired from Cleveland, Ohio. The final WCW World Heavyweight Championship match for the show and the company saw WCW United States Heavyweight Champion Booker T defeat Scott Steiner to win the WCW World Heavyweight Championship. The main event featured Sting defeating Flair with the Scorpion Deathlock as a culmination of their trademark feud, then both men embraced one another at the match's conclusion. This was a direct parallel to the very first Nitro episode, where Sting vs. Flair was also featured. After the Sting/Flair match, McMahon appeared on Raw to close Nitro and to declare victory over WCW. McMahon's son Shane then appeared on Nitro, declaring that it was actually he who had bought WCW. This initiated a storyline in which Shane led a WCW invasion of the WWF. The last WCW broadcast was the already-taped final episode of WCW WorldWide which aired in syndication six days after the final Nitro broadcast (one day before WrestleMania X-Seven, although several stations aired it in the early hours of the day of the event).

There were many aborted attempts to run WCW-branded events (including a proposed Saturday night timeslot that later evolved into WWF Excess and then WWE Velocity) and the WWF only ran a handful of matches on Raw and SmackDown! under the WCW banner which were ill-received by fans. On the very first WCW-branded main event between Booker T and Buff Bagwell, the crowd cheered when the WWF heels Stone Cold Steve Austin and Kurt Angle ran in to jump the WCW face Booker T. This would also cause Bagwell to be fired from the WWF after only one week of employment.

In 2004, WWE Home Video released a DVD called The Monday Night Wars. The objectivity of the DVD's content was questioned, as some believed the documentary was simply telling WWE's side of the story. On August 25, 2009, WWE released The Rise and Fall of WCW on DVD. The DVD looked back at the roots of WCW during the days of GCW and Mid-Atlantic Championship Wrestling, to the glory days of Nitro and the nWo, and to its demise and sale to WWE. This DVD included several new interviews from McMahon, Flair, Rhodes, Goldberg and Jim Crockett, as well as many of those responsible for running the NWA and WCW. Archive interviews were included from former WCW talent such as Hogan and Bischoff, due to their respective contracts with Total Nonstop Action Wrestling (TNA) not allowing them to provide fresh interviews for WWE. In 2014, WWE Network premiered The Monday Night War: WWE vs. WCW, a documentary series that covered a much broader scope, and provided more equal viewpoints for both WWE and WCW.

On December 16, 2017, the Universal Wrestling Corporation, the remaining remnant of WCW, merged into Turner Broadcasting.
