= WCW Power Hour =

- Created by: Jim Crockett Promotions, National Wrestling Alliance
- Starring: See List of World Championship Wrestling alumni
- Country of origin: United States
- No. of episodes: 300

Original release
- Network: TBS Superstation
- Release: June 23, 1989 – March 5, 1994

Related
- WCW WorldWide; WCW Pro; WCW Main Event; WCW Prime

WCW Power Hour (originally NWA Power Hour) was the original Friday-night wrestling show for World Championship Wrestling (WCW), airing on TBS from June 23, 1989 to March 5, 1994.

Unlike most television (and wrestling) shows that started their program either at the top or bottom of the hour, WCW Power Hour aired 10 minutes before the bottom of the hour at 10:20 p.m. In Summer 1990 when it was moved to Saturday mornings, it adopted a more traditional television time slot. The rights to WCW Power Hour now belong to WWE. Jim Ross and Jim Cornette were the original hosts and commentators of the show.

== Title changes ==
WCW Power Hour featured numerous title changes.

- Arn Anderson defeated The Great Muta to win the NWA World Television Championship on January 12, 1990 (taped January 2, 1990)
- The Hollywood Blonds (Steve Austin and Brian Pillman) defeated Ricky Steamboat and Shane Douglas to win the NWA and WCW World Tag Team Championships on March 27, 1993 (taped March 2, 1993)

== "WCW Gauntlet" ==
It was one of three TBS wrestling shows to have WCW's "WCW Gauntlet", where a wrestler would have to win all three of his matches on NWA Power Hour, NWA World Championship Wrestling, and NWA Main Event in order to win $15,000.

== Cancellation ==
The 300th and final episode of WCW Power Hour (previously NWA Power Hour) aired on March 5, 1994.

== Canadian version ==
A Canadian version of WCW Power Hour ran on TSN from 1991 to 1993. That version was originally hosted by Jim Ross and Paul E. Dangerously, who would later be joined by Missy Hyatt. Later broadcast teams on the show would include:

- Eric Bischoff and Missy Hyatt
- Eric Bischoff and Teddy Long
- Tony Gilliam and Teddy Long
- Gordon Solie and Larry Zbyszko (the final announcing team before the show's cancellation in 1994)
