= WCW Disney tapings =

Wrestling matches at a theme park

The WCW Disney tapings were a series of television tapings of professional wrestling matches conducted by the now defunct World Championship Wrestling (WCW) at the Disney-MGM Studios (now Disney's Hollywood Studios) in Lake Buena Vista, Florida.

== History ==
In 1993, WCW began taping in-ring footage for their syndicated television shows (such as WCW WorldWide, WCW Pro, and WCW Prime) at the Disney/MGM Studios. Eric Bischoff who had become the executive producer of WCW, wanted to get away from the old school Southern arenas to a more modern arena, with bright lights. The ring in the studios was on top of a rotating platform that expanded the ringside area and increased the distance between the ring and the seats.

Because the footage recorded would often be shown on television months later, the tapings often exposed bookings and storylines well in advance. WCW was usually forced to have wrestlers appear with title belts before they had won them in regards to the current storyline. This was regarded as a major breach of kayfabe at the time, and ultimately led to WCW's departure from the National Wrestling Alliance in September 1993.

=== Crowds ===
The crowds present for the tapings were most often tourists that were given free passes to the tapings, handed free souvenirs and merchandise, and coached to cheer and boo on cue. Much of the Hulk Hogan merchandise seen during the beginning of his tenure in WCW was handed out by WCW staffers, and wearing the merchandise was often a requirement to be allowed to occupy a seat within view of the cameras.

Many of the wrestling fans that got in reported what they saw to the dirt sheets and the burgeoning Internet discussion forums. The results of the tapings laid out most of WCW's booking plans months in advance, effectively removing the suspense in title matches for fans who were aware of the taping results.

=== 1996 Monday Nitro broadcasts ===
In the summer of 1996, WCW Monday Nitro broadcast a few shows live from Disney/MGM while WCW Saturday Night was taped at WCW Pro's set due to all of WCW owner Turner Broadcasting's mobile production units being used by other broadcasters for the 1996 Summer Olympics in Atlanta.

=== Move to Universal Studios, end of era ===
WCW stopped recording its syndicated programming at Disney in 1997 and moved the Worldwide and Pro tapings to Universal Studios Florida, also located in Orlando. In 1998, WCW converted their syndicated programming into highlight shows recapping what had gone on on their other shows but still featured one or two matches as exclusives. These continued to be taped in Orlando as the company continued to lease space at Universal, but these were eventually instead taped alongside WCW Saturday Night and then became part of the WCW Thunder tapings. The matches were scrapped altogether as part of companywide budget cuts in 2000.

== Logistical errors ==
Brian Pillman and Steve Austin, as The Hollywood Blonds, were WCW/NWA World Tag Team Champions for a good portion of 1993, but were scheduled to drop the tag title sometime before footage of Arn Anderson and Paul Roma with the title belts was due to start appearing on WCW syndicated television. Pillman suffered a legitimate injury shortly before the Clash of the Champions XXIV show in August 1993, and WCW was forced to replace him with Lord Steven Regal so that the scheduled title change could take place.

Also in 1993, several weeks of syndicated programming was taped with Sid Vicious as WCW World Heavyweight Champion. Sid was scheduled to defeat Vader at Starrcade '93, and the material taped would have begun airing in early 1994. However, Sid was fired several weeks before the PPV for engaging in a hotel room brawl with Arn Anderson during a tour of the United Kingdom. In choosing to have Ric Flair win the WCW World Heavyweight Championship instead, WCW was forced to post-produce or scrap the material taped with Sid as champion. In order to prevent these errors from occurring, in the late 1990s, there were no title belts worn during WorldWide TV tapings.
