= WCW Prime =

- WCW Prime logo
- Created by: World Championship Wrestling
- Starring: See World Championship Wrestling alumni
- Country of origin: United States
- Original language: English

Production
- Camera setup: Multicamera setup
- Running time: 60 minutes

Original release
- Network: Prime Sports Network
- Release: February 6, 1995 – October 14, 1996

WCW Prime is an American professional wrestling show produced by World Championship Wrestling (WCW) which aired on the Prime Sports Network Mondays from February 6, 1995 to October 14, 1996. Along with WCW WorldWide and WCW Pro, it was part of the WCW Disney tapings (matches were, in fact, shot on the same set that WorldWide was using at the time). The rights to WCW Prime now belong to WWE.

== Format ==
WCW Prime mainly featured mid-card matches. There was little storyline advancement and few appearances by main-event wrestlers on the show. Sometimes, matches from WCW WorldWide and WCW Saturday Night were featured, along with highlights from the major shows such as WCW Monday Nitro. The main event was referred to as the "Prime Match of the Week" on-air. The show was hosted by Dusty Rhodes and Chris Cruise, who was later replaced by Tony Schiavone. The show was a little more relaxed than the other programs, with much comedy in the commentary. For instance, right before the "Prime Match of the Week", Dusty Rhodes would call it the "Moo Match of the Week" and moo on-camera because of a dairy sponsorship.

== Final episode branding ==
The final episode of the show was presented on-air as simply WCW Wrestling and no reference to Prime was made by the hosts or on any graphics. This was likely due to Prime Sports Network being on the verge of closure and the episode being legally-obligated to air.
