= WCW Pro =

- Also known as: Mid-Atlantic Championship Wrestling; NWA Pro Wrestling; WCW Pro Wrestling
- Created by: Jim Crockett Promotions / World Championship Wrestling
- Starring: See World Championship Wrestling alumni
- Country of origin: United States

Production
- Camera setup: Multicamera setup
- Running time: 60 minutes per episode

Original release
- Network: Syndicated (1985–1994); TBS (1994–1998)
- Release: January 11, 1958 – September 27, 1998

Related
- WCW Monday Nitro; WCW Thunder; WCW Saturday Night; WCW WorldWide; WCW Clash of the Champions

WCW Pro is an American televised wrestling show that was presented by World Championship Wrestling (WCW). Along with WCW WorldWide, it was part of the WCW Disney tapings. It was the "B" show of WCW syndication, meaning it generally only aired in markets where WCW had two weekly slots, with the other taken up by the 'A' show of WCW syndication, WCW WorldWide. The rights to WCW Pro now belong to WWE and 161 episodes of Mid-Atlantic Championship Wrestling are available for streaming on NBCUniversal's Peacock in the United States and the WWE Network in international markets.

== History ==
=== Mid-Atlantic Championship Wrestling (1958–1986) ===
WCW Pro started off as Mid-Atlantic Championship Wrestling, one of two weekly syndicated wrestling programs presented by Jim Crockett Promotions (the other was World Wide Wrestling, which in its final form was named WCW WorldWide). It started airing in 1958.

=== NWA Pro Wrestling/WCW Pro Wrestling (1986–1994) ===
After the merger of JCP and Georgia Championship Wrestling, in 1986 the show was renamed NWA Pro Wrestling. It was later renamed WCW Pro Wrestling in December 1990 after Turner Broadcasting bought JCP in 1988.

==== New York and Chicago editions (1990–1993) ====
In 1990, a hybrid edition of WCW Pro Wrestling began airing over WPIX in New York City and WGN-TV in Chicago; these two shows featured the same matches as the national version, but with wraparound segments localized for the specific markets inserted.

Jim Ross and Paul E. Dangerously hosted WPIX's WCW Pro New York. In late-September 1991, the New York version moved to WCBS-TV where the show aired in a late-night Saturday slot. However, after only a few weeks, the local version was dropped and WCBS-TV replaced it with the national version of the show. In April 1992, WCW Pro was replaced in New York altogether by WCW WorldWide (the show that WCW Pro New York replaced two years earlier on WPIX), which stayed on WCBS-TV for the next five years. WPXN-TV later picked up WCW Pro for its lineup, airing the show from 1996 until its cancellation.

WCW Pro Chicago was hosted by Tony Schiavone and veteran WGN sports broadcaster Jack Brickhouse. This show was also simulcast on WGN's national feed. Sometime in 1991, Brickhouse would leave commentary on the Chicago version to host his own segment on the program, "Brickhouse Bonus", and Larry Zbyszko took over Jack's old spot on commentary. WCW Pro Chicago would last until 1993.

=== WCW Pro (1994–1998) ===
In 1994 the show, now available on very few local stations, was added to TBS on Saturday mornings in place of WCW's ill-fated WCW Power Hour on March 12, 1994. Some stations continued to air it in syndication, however. The show title also was shortened to simply WCW Pro.

In November 1995, WCW started taping WCW Pro at the Disney/MGM Studios (and later at Universal Studios Florida). Starting August 25, 1996, the show moved from its established TBS timeslot of Saturday morning at 9:05 am EST to Sunday afternoons at 5:05 pm EST, where it remained until it was canceled by TBS and replaced by WCW Thunder in January 1998. Shortly afterwards the now syndication-only WCW Pro became a weekly highlights and recap show with one or two exclusive matches a week. Scott Hudson and Larry Zbyszko hosted the in-studio segments while Lee Marshall and Mike Tenay called the matches. TBS would continue to air Thunder and Saturday Night.

In late September 1998, WCW Pro was canceled.

== Title changes ==
WCW Pro had a few title changes.

- Roddy Piper defeated Jack Brisco to win the NWA Mid-Atlantic Heavyweight Championship on July 7, 1982
- Paul Jones defeated Jack Brisco to win the NWA Mid-Atlantic Heavyweight Championship on September 1, 1982
- Ron Garvin and Barry Windham defeated Krusher Khrushchev and Ivan Koloff to win the NWA United States Tag Team Championship on December 13, 1986 (taped December 9, 1986)
- The Steiner Brothers (Rick Steiner and Scott Steiner) defeated The Fabulous Freebirds (Jimmy Garvin and Michael Hayes) to win the WCW World Tag Team Championship on March 9, 1991 (taped February 18, 1991).
