= Scott Hudson (wrestler) =

American professional wrestling ring announcer)

Personal information
- Born: September 20, 1964 (age 61) Atlanta, Georgia, U.S.

Professional wrestling career
- Ring name: Scott Hudson
- Billed height: 6 ft 1 in (1.85 m)
- Billed weight: 250 lb (110 kg)
- Debut: 1988
- Retired: 2022

Scott Hudson (born September 20, 1964) is an American professional wrestling ring announcer who worked for World Championship Wrestling, World Wrestling Federation, Global Wrestling Federation and Total Nonstop Action Wrestling.

== Career ==
Hudson made his professional wrestling debut in 1988 for the World Wrestling Federation.

In 1990 Husdon began his announcing career with Global Wrestling Federation, based in Dallas, Texas.

In 1998 he moved to World Championship Wrestling (WCW), teaming up with Tony Schiavone and other WCW commentators on WCW Saturday Night and WCW Monday Nitro. On March 26, 2001, Hudson and Schiavone called the final WCW Nitro telecast on TNT after the World Wrestling Federation (WWF) purchased WCW. In June 2001 the WWF wanted Hudson and Joey Styles to come in full-time but they both turned down the offer. The WWF asked Hudson to do two weeks of television just to push the Invasion angle, which he agreed to do. On July 2, 2001 Scott Hudson debuted with the World Wrestling Federation on RAW in Tacoma, Washington. Scott Hudson was teamed up with Arn Anderson at the broadcast table as part of the WCW Invasion angle. The first-ever match that featured WCW performers was between Booker T. and Buff Bagwell in a WCW World Heavyweight Championship match.

In 2003, Hudson debuted in Total Nonstop Action Wrestling (TNA) as a fill-in announcer and full-time backstage interviewer until 2004. He would then work for NWA Wildside.

In 2005, Hudson joined Vince Russo's "Ring Of Glory" Christian Wrestling promotion/ministry. From 2006 to 2022, he worked in the independent circuit, including the Jeff Peterson Memorial Cup from 2007 to 2008 and Pro South Wrestling in Alabama in 2022.
