= WCW WorldWide =

Professional wrestling television program

- Logo 1999–2001
- Also known as: Wide World Wrestling; NWA World Wide Wrestling
- Created by: Jim Crockett Promotions / World Championship Wrestling
- Starring: See World Championship Wrestling alumni
- Country of origin: United States

Production
- Camera setup: Multicamera setup
- Running time: 60 minutes per episode

Original release
- Network: Syndicated
- Release: October 8, 1975 – March 31, 2001

Related
- WCW Monday Nitro; WCW Thunder; WCW Saturday Night; WCW Clash of the Champions; WCW Pro

WCW WorldWide is an American syndicated television show that was produced by World Championship Wrestling (WCW) that aired from October 8, 1975, to March 31, 2001. At the time of its cancellation, WorldWide was the longest-running, uninterrupted weekly syndicated show of any kind on the air in the United States.

== History ==
=== Wide World Wrestling (1975–1978) ===
The show began in 1975 as Wide World Wrestling, a syndicated one-hour program produced by Charlotte, North Carolina–based Jim Crockett Promotions. It was taped each Wednesday night at the studios of WRAL-TV in Raleigh, North Carolina, following the taping of the syndicated Mid-Atlantic Championship Wrestling. The original host of Wide World Wrestling was former Georgia Championship Wrestling announcer Ed Capral.

Later hosts of Wide World Wrestling included George Scott, Sandy Scott, Dr. Tom Miller, and Les Thatcher.

=== NWA / WCW World Wide Wrestling (1978–1992) ===
In 1978, to avoid confusion with ABC's Wide World of Sports (many newspapers would incorrectly mix the two shows up in their listings), JCP changed the name of the show to NWA World Wide Wrestling. Rich Landrum became the new host and was joined shortly thereafter by veteran wrestler Johnny Weaver as color commentator.

In the summer of 1981, WRAL-TV opted not to renew its contract with JCP, citing that it needed the studio space to produce a new local version of PM Magazine. Crockett initially worked out a deal with WCCB in Charlotte to house the tapings, but after that fell through he instead moved his production to a rival Charlotte station, then-Westinghouse Broadcasting-owned WPCQ-TV (now WCNC-TV), a station which until recently had been owned by Ted Turner.

WPCQ-TV had briefly played host to tapings for Eddie Einhorn's International Wrestling Association in the 1970s, so it seemed like a natural fit. The physical studio itself was very cramped however; the ring, television sets, banners, and camera platforms, which had been positioned symmetrically at WRAL-TV, were now positioned off-center.

Landrum left World Wide Wrestling in 1982 after being released by Jim Crockett Promotions in a cost-cutting measure. David Crockett left his position as Bob Caudle's color commentator on Mid-Atlantic Championship Wrestling to take over play-by-play duties on World Wide.

For a time, World Wide ran with a three-man announce team as wrestler Ray "The Crippler" Stevens joined. Rowdy Roddy Piper would also occasionally commentate.

Not pleased with the studio situation, Crockett began to make plans to rectify matters and by July 1983, had moved his tapings out of WPCQ-TV and into major arenas, buying a mobile TV truck for $1 million and hiring his own crew.

In 1984, Tony Schiavone replaced Weaver as color commentator on World Wide (with Weaver moving over to join Caudle on Mid-Atlantic). Schiavone had previously worked for JCP as the announcer for their minor league baseball team the Charlotte O's, and as the host of their market-specific promotional interview segments, which were used to promote events in individual towns. Tully Blanchard for a time joined World Wide as a color commentator as well.

After the sale of JCP's wrestling assets to Turner Broadcasting in 1988, World Wide Wrestling went through a revolving series of announcing teams and included at various times such names as Schiavone, Jim Ross, Gordon Solie, Lance Russell, Chris Cruise, Terry Funk, Dutch Mantell, Ole Anderson, Jesse "The Body" Ventura, Scott Hudson, Bobby "The Brain" Heenan and Larry Zbyszko.

=== WCW WorldWide (1992–2001) ===
Under the Bill Watts regime, the name World Wide Wrestling was changed to WCW WorldWide in 1992.

WorldWide was originally made up of matches from television tapings around the country. Beginning in 1993, when Eric Bischoff took over, the show was taped in Orlando, Florida. The initial home for these tapings was Disney/MGM Studios at Walt Disney World, which gave rise to the term "Disney Tapings". The last set of tapings at Disney occurred in November 1996 and aired in February 1997; afterward, Disney evicted WCW from the studio space it was using and the company moved across Orlando to Universal Studios Florida.

In 1998, WorldWide became an in-studio recap show like its sister program WCW Pro had, with an exclusive match or two at the end of the show. These matches continued to be taped in Orlando. On January 23, 1999, the WorldWide exclusive matches were moved out of Orlando and began being taped with WCW Saturday Night, which left its base in Atlanta in 1996 and had become a traveling show. Later still, the matches were moved a second time and began to be recorded before WCW Thunder tapings.

In November 2000, the show would change formats, seldom having exclusive matches, and instead would mostly show matches from previous WCW pay-per-view events (as well as providing a recap of that week's Monday Nitro and Thunder).

WorldWide was cancelled along with Monday Nitro and Thunder the day before the World Wrestling Federation (WWF) purchased WCW's tape library and intellectual property. At the time of its cancellation, WorldWide was the longest-running, uninterrupted weekly syndicated show of any kind on the air in the United States. The final episode of WorldWide aired on March 31, 2001, making it the last WCW television show aired. Some syndicated stations would air WorldWide very early in the morning on Sunday (12:00 to 1:00 a.m., 1:00 to 2:00 a.m., etc.), so there are people who consider the last episode's date to be April 1, 2001, the day of WrestleMania X-Seven.

And this wraps up WCW WorldWide not just for this week but...forever and a day! WCW gone, WorldWide gone, we want to thank you for joining us each and every week here on WorldWide. What a great crew we had! It's been a lot of fun...taping these shows and you can see we have a really good time! For Mike Tenay, I'm Scott Hudson, we'll see you down the road...somewhere else! Thanks for watching WorldWide!

— Scott Hudson at the end of WorldWide's final episode.

=== Title changes ===
Throughout the years, WorldWide hosted numerous title changes.

- Magnum T. A. defeated Wahoo McDaniel in a steel cage match to win The NWA US Heavyweight Championship (taped March 23, 1985)
- Ron Garvin defeated Ric Flair in a steel cage match to win the NWA World Heavyweight Championship on September 25, 1987 (taped September 26, 1987)
- The Fantastics (Bobby Fulton and Tommy Rogers) defeated The Midnight Express (Bobby Eaton and Stan Lane) to win the NWA United States Tag Team Championship on May 14, 1988 (taped April 26, 1988)
- Eddie Gilbert and Rick Steiner defeated The Varsity Club (Kevin Sullivan and Steve Williams) to win the NWA United States Tag Team Championship on March 18, 1989 (taped February 28, 1989)
- Lex Luger defeated Michael Hayes to win the NWA United States Championship on May 22, 1989 (taped June 10, 1989)
- Brian Pillman and Tom Zenk defeated The Fabulous Freebirds (Jimmy Garvin and Michael Hayes) in a tournament final to win the reactivated NWA United States Tag Team Championship on February 24, 1990 (taped February 12, 1990)
- Arn Anderson defeated Tom Zenk to win the WCW World Television Championship on January 27, 1991 (taped January 7, 1991)
- The Fabulous Freebirds (Jimmy Garvin and Michael Hayes) and Badstreet defeated Tommy Rich and Junkyard Dog in a handicap match to win the WCW World Six-Man Tag Team Championship on June 22, 1991 (taped June 3, 1991)
- Steve Austin defeated Bobby Eaton to win the WCW World Television Championship on June 29, 1991 (taped June 3, 1991, re-taped June 4, 1991)
- Dustin Rhodes, Tom Zenk, and Big Josh defeated The Fabulous Freebirds (Jimmy Garvin and Michael Hayes) and Badstreet to win the WCW World Six-Man Tag Team Championship on August 24, 1991 (taped August 5, 1991)
- The York Foundation (Richard Morton, Tommy Rich and Terrance Taylor) defeated Dustin Rhodes, Tom Zenk, and Big Josh to win the WCW World Six-Man Tag Team Championship on November 10, 1991 (taped October 8, 1991)
- Steve Austin defeated Barry Windham to win the WCW World Television Championship on June 13, 1992 (taped May 23, 1992)
- Scott Steiner defeated Ricky Steamboat to win the WCW World Television Championship on October 17, 1992 (taped September 29, 1992)
- The Hollywood Blonds (Steve Austin and Brian Pillman) defeated Ricky Steamboat and Shane Douglas to win the Unified NWA/WCW World Tag Team Championship on March 27, 1993 (taped March 2, 1993)
- Paul Orndorff defeated Erik Watts in a tournament final to win the WCW World Television Championship on April 4, 1993 (taped March 2, 1993)
- Rick Rude (subbing for an injured Kensuke Sasaki) defeated Dustin Rhodes to win the WCW United States Heavyweight Championship on May 15, 1993 (taped April 20, 1993)
- Harlem Heat (Booker T and Stevie Ray) defeated The Nasty Boys (Jerry Sags and Brian Knobbs) to win the WCW World Tag Team Championship on June 24, 1995 (taped May 3, 1995)
- Dean Malenko defeated Shinjiro Otani to win the WCW World Cruiserweight Championship on May 18, 1996 (taped May 2, 1996)

== WorldWide in the United Kingdom ==
Up until 2019 (six years after the UK's five traditional channels had ceased analogue broadcasts, subsequently being carried as part of digital television platform Freeview) when Channel 5 started showing highlights of WWE Raw and SmackDown and AEW Dynamite started airing on ITV4, WCW WorldWide was one of only two American wrestling shows (the other being Sunday Night Heat on Channel 4) to have had a regular syndicated slot on UK terrestrial television, having appeared on two different over-the-air networks/channels during its lifetime.

Beginning in 1991, WCW WorldWide was broadcast in the UK on the ITV network originally overnight at 1 or 2 a.m. alongside other U.S. imports such as American Gladiators and America's Top Ten. In spring of 1992 however, it was also broadcast in local British Wrestling's old Saturday afternoon slot. In late 1995, however, the show was moved back to the late night slot and eventually disappeared from the network, with WCW being taken up by pan-European satellite channel Super Channel.

In July 1999 following Super Channel's demise, WorldWide returned to TV in the UK on Channel 5, who broadcast the show at 7 p.m. on Friday evenings, although occasionally the show would be broadcast in a late-night mid-week time-slot instead. These shows were a collection of matches from Nitro, Thunder and Saturday Night, which had taken place five or six weeks before. The announcers were usually Scott Hudson and Larry Zbyszko, who provided dubbed commentary with references aimed at the UK viewers. In order to keep the more extreme action suitable for a pre-watershed audience any attacks with weapons such as steel chairs were comically covered over with large, cartoonish effects with "BLAM!" or "SMASH!" inside them. Due to being moved around the schedules and skipping some weeks, the show continued until April 20, 2001, three weeks after the final American broadcast. This episode contained re-aired and edited Nitro matches throughout 2001 to the WorldWide theme, and was different from the final American broadcast. Following the purchase of WCW by the WWF, older versions of WorldWide were repeated on Sky Sports.
