= WCW Thunder =

Professional wrestling television program

- The official Thunder logo
- Created by: Ted Turner; Eric Bischoff
- Directed by: Rick Fansher; Mike Miller
- Starring: World Championship Wrestling roster
- Opening theme: "Out to Lunch/Thunder" by Steve Everitt; "Here Comes the Pain" (instrumental) by Slayer (February 16, 2000–March 21, 2001)
- Country of origin: United States
- Original language: English
- No. of episodes: 156

Production
- Camera setup: Multi-camera setup
- Running time: 120 minutes

Original release
- Network: TBS
- Release: January 8, 1998 – March 21, 2001

Related
- WCW Monday Nitro; WCW Saturday Night; WCW WorldWide; WCW Clash of the Champions; WCW Pro

WCW Thunder, or simply Thunder, is an American professional wrestling show produced by World Championship Wrestling (WCW) which aired on TBS from January 8, 1998 to March 21, 2001.

The popularity of WCW in 1996 and 1997 allowed for the creation of a new show, which became WCW Thunder. Thunder was taped on Tuesday nights and then aired on Thursday, a change for WCW as producer Eric Bischoff was very keen on its primary show WCW Monday Nitro being aired live every week.

The rights to WCW Thunder now belong to WWE, who purchased WCW properties in 2001. The trademark for "WCW Thunder" was renewed by WWE in 2018. As of June 30, 2023, all 156 episodes of Thunder are available to stream on the WWE Network and Peacock. In 2025, WWE started uploading episodes to a WCW YouTube Channel.

== History ==
=== Creation ===
The popularity of World Championship Wrestling (WCW)'s primary show, WCW Monday Nitro on TNT, led Ted Turner to create a new show, which would eventually be named Thunder, that would air Thursdays on TBS. According to the Wrestling Observer, WCW originally named the program Thursday Thunder, but dropped "Thursday" from the title to distinguish it from a similarly named program on ESPN and to provide TBS more programming flexibility if they were to move the broadcast to a different day of the week.

WCW executive vice-president Eric Bischoff was originally reluctant to produce another two-hour weekly television show for a variety of reasons. First, Time Warner Entertainment (WCW's parent company) was under a hiring freeze which prevented Bischoff from bringing in additional production people to run the show. Second, he felt WCW did not have enough talent to produce another show, and risked overexposing them and making storylines less significant. Third, according to Bischoff, TBS refused to pay the cost of producing Thunder which was between $12 million and $15 million per year.

Bischoff eventually decided that he could make the new show work and help pay for it by expanding revenue from increased house show business. Bischoff was also given permission to sign Bret Hart, specifically as a high-profile talent to perform on Thunder. WCW Thunder originally debuted as a live weekly show, but the schedule was changed by Bischoff in August 1998 due to complaints by wrestlers over travel demands. Tapings were expanded to four hours, with the first two hours being broadcast live, and the last two hours taped to air the following week.

WCW Thunder debuted on January 8, 1998 and drew a 4.02 Nielsen rating. The first match to take place in Thunder featured Chris Adams against Randy Savage with Miss Elizabeth. Adams pinned Savage after a chairshot from Lex Luger. The match decision was reversed by WCW Commissioner/Chairman of Executive Committee J. J. Dillon.

WCW Thunder debuted for viewers in England on October 3, 1998 on broadcast cable network TNT Europe.

In 1998, WCW Thunder consistently had one of the highest Nielsen ratings on cable, at one time rivaling the audience size of a Thursday night NFL broadcast on ESPN. The Wrestling Observer reported the December 3, 1998 WCW Thunder show had a 3.7 rating head-to-head against the NFL game, which drew a 4.5 rating. WCW Thunder's success in 1998 included ticket sales, as a number of live events sold out and grossed gates over $100,000. The WCW Thunder at the Fargodome in Fargo, North Dakota on April 16, 1998 drew 15,362 people and grossed $274,393 in ticket sales, which were both records highs for that market.

=== 2000–2001 ===
WCW Thunder switched from Thursday evenings to Wednesday evenings on January 12, 2000. Since WWF SmackDown! debuted on UPN (a broadcast television network) on August 26, 1999 in the same time slot as Thunder, WCW had been losing to the WWF in the ratings on Thursdays.

On October 9, 2000, WCW moved the Thunder tapings to Monday nights, the same night as Nitro. After the live Nitro broadcast ended, the Thunder taping would commence. This practice continued until March 19, 2001, when Thunder taped its last episode. Bryan Alvarez and R. D. Reynolds wrote in their book, The Death of WCW, the reasoning behind the tapings was attendance at Thunder events had dropped considerably over the previous twenty-one months.

Towards the end of the show's run, WCW Thunder was the anchor of a TBS programming block known as iWatch Wednesdays (later renamed Enhanced TBS), which was tied to the website TBS Interactive. After installing a web browser plugin, users had access to forums, games and contests related to the TBS programs, including Thunder.

=== Final broadcast ===
In an attempt to save WCW, Bischoff attempted to purchase WCW with Fusient Media Ventures. However, although Bischoff's offer had been accepted, recently appointed Turner Broadcasting executive Jamie Kellner announced shortly after his arrival that Thunder and all WCW programming was immediately canceled on TBS and TNT. Bischoff's group then withdrew their offer, as it was contingent on keeping WCW programming on some outlet. WCW's trademarks and certain assets (such as its video library and the contracts of 24 wrestlers), though not WCW itself (which continued to exist as a Time Warner-owned subsidiary under the name Universal Wrestling Corporation), were bought by the WWF, its long-time competitor.

Thunder was the third-from-last WCW broadcast before the final episode of WCW WorldWide on March 31, 2001. WCW Thunder was the final wrestling broadcast to air on TBS until AEW Dynamite moved to TBS on January 5, 2022.

=== Reception ===
Veteran industry journalist Wade Keller said that the introduction of Thunder could be called "the beginning of the end" for the now-defunct WCW, adding that the program's debut "is probably as good of a turning point as you could pick out".

Wrestling Observer subscribers voted WCW Thunder the worst weekly television show in 1999 and 2000.
