= WCW Saturday Night =

Professional wrestling television program

- The WCW Saturday Night logo as it appeared from 1994 to 1999.
- Also known as: Georgia Championship Wrestling; World Championship Wrestling; NWA World Championship Wrestling; WCW Saturday Morning
- Genre: Professional wrestling
- Created by: Jim Crockett Promotions / World Championship Wrestling
- Starring: See World Championship Wrestling alumni
- Theme music composer: Richard Harvey ("Dynamics"); Jimmy Guthrie ("Raver")
- Opening theme: "Dynamics" (1982-1987) "Raver" (1999-2000)
- Country of origin: United States

Production
- Camera setup: Multicamera setup
- Running time: 60 to 120 minutes per episode

Original release
- Network: TBS
- Release: December 25, 1971 – August 19, 2000

Related
- WCW Monday Nitro; WCW Thunder; WCW WorldWide; WCW Clash of the Champions; WCW Pro

WCW Saturday Night is an American weekly Saturday night pro wrestling television show on TBS that was produced by World Championship Wrestling (WCW). Launched in 1971 initially by Georgia Championship Wrestling, the program existed through various incarnations under different names before becoming WCW Saturday Night in 1992. Although initially the anchor show of the Turner Broadcasting-backed wrestling company, the September 1995 premiere of WCW Monday Nitro airing on sister station TNT usurped the show's once preeminent position in the company, as the primary source of storyline development and pay-per-view buildup.

The show's place in the company was further devalued by the advent of WCW Thunder in 1998, airing on TBS and providing the secondary wrestling and storyline development that WCW Saturday Night had produced in the wake of Nitro's burgeoning three-hour-long format. Once the cornerstone of the WCW wrestling empire, WCW Saturday Night ended its run in 2000 as WCW struggled creatively to meet the demands of producing over six hours of new broadcast material on a weekly basis. The rights to WCW Saturday Night now belong to WWE as a result of that company's 2001 purchase of selected assets of WCW, including its video library.

Fifty-nine episodes from 1992 to 1993 under the WCW Saturday Night banner are available on the streaming service WWE Network and Peacock. Some previous episodes from 1985 to 1989 under the World Championship Wrestling banner were progressively made available in 2015 and 2016 on the WWE Network.

== History ==
WCW Saturday Night had its roots in Saturday night pro wrestling programming that began airing on TBS's local independent station predecessor in 1972. For nearly three decades, TBS continued to carry pro wrestling on early Saturday evenings under a series of names. In all of its incarnations, WCW Saturday Night would normally air for two hours beginning at 6:05 pm eastern time. During the Major League Baseball season, however, it would typically air for one hour, to be immediately followed by Braves TBS Baseball.

=== Georgia Championship Wrestling (1971–1982) ===
On December 25, 1971, Georgia Championship Wrestling aired its first show on WTCG, a UHF independent station in Atlanta, as a Christmas special. Beginning in late January 1972, the promotion switched its Atlanta television outlet from its longtime home, WQXI-TV (now WXIA-TV) to WTCG.

In 1976 WTCG, renamed WTBS in 1979, began retransmitting its signal via satellite and became a superstation available to cable systems across the United States. As a result, Georgia Championship Wrestling became the first promotion affiliated with the National Wrestling Alliance (NWA) to have its television program broadcast nationally. Many of the NWA's regional promoters were unhappy, but promoter Jim Barnett claimed since he was only using Georgia-based wrestlers, that there was no harm. Whether or not Barnett was in fact taking the promotion national is a matter of dispute. Some wrestlers, such as Roddy Piper, believed that national expansion was Barnett's intention, but he was wary of crossing organized crime figures involved with the business. Throughout the 1970s, Georgia Championship Wrestling was one of the most popular programs on WTBS.

The Georgia Championship Wrestling TV series, hosted by Gordon Solie, was taped at the WTBS studios at 1050 Techwood Drive in Atlanta before a small, live in-studio audience, as were most pro wrestling TV shows of that era. The show featured wrestling matches, plus melodramatic monologues and inter-character confrontations—similar to the programming offered by other territories, such as the World Wrestling Federation (WWF, now WWE), the American Wrestling Association (AWA), Jim Crockett Promotions' Mid-Atlantic Championship Wrestling, and Mid-South Wrestling.

=== World Championship Wrestling (1982–1992) ===
In 1982, Georgia Championship Wrestling changed the name of its main program to World Championship Wrestling, a name Barnett had previously used when promoting in Australia. WTBS owner Ted Turner had requested the name change in hopes of giving the wrestling programming on the Superstation a less regional scope. Also, by this point, GCW had been running shows in "neutral" territories like Ohio and Michigan. World Championship Wrestling continued to be taped at the TBS studios until March 1989, when the taping location was moved to the Center Stage Theater in Atlanta. April 1, 1989, marked the first episode of WCW held at Center Stage, with Jim Ross and Michael Hayes commentating (reuniting the announce team from the old Mid-South and UWF programs from 1986 to 1987). The final show under the World Championship Wrestling name aired on March 28, 1992.

==== Black Saturday (1984–1985) ====
In 1984, WWF owner Vince McMahon, hoping to expand the national reach of his Stamford, Connecticut-based company, bought a majority stake in the Georgia territory, and its WTBS time slot, for $750,000. On July 14 of that year, viewers tuned into World Championship Wrestling expecting to see Gordon Solie and the usual studio matches featuring GCW stars, only to witness McMahon introducing pre-recorded WWF bouts instead, an event now known in professional wrestling lore as Black Saturday. Freddie Miller, an announcer, was the only member of the original Georgia Championship Wrestling on-air cast who did not either quit in protest or get replaced by McMahon.

McMahon had underestimated two major factors, however. The first was the difference in tastes between wrestling fans from different regions of the United States. GCW matches featured an emphasis on in-ring action with longer and more athletic matches. The WWF, however, was more soap opera-like in character, with cartoonish characters and storylines, and also tended to feature short squash matches in which one wrestler dominated the other. GCW's core audience thus did not receive the WWF product now shown on WTBS well.

Secondly, McMahon had promised Ted Turner that he would produce original programming for the time slot at the WTBS studios in Atlanta. Instead, WWF World Championship Wrestling was mainly used as a recap show, featuring matches which had previously aired on the WWF's main syndicated programs such as Championship Wrestling and All-Star Wrestling, which were originally produced in the Northeast. Eventually, the WWF did have in-studio squash matches on the show on an infrequent basis. During this time, the show was co-hosted by Freddie Miller and Gorilla Monsoon, with Monsoon serving as the play-by-play announcer and Miller serving as the ring announcer. This did not stem the tide of negative viewer reaction to the WWF show, however. Angry viewers deluged WTBS with over a thousand complaints, demanding to know where GCW had gone.

Turner, angry both at the declining ratings and at McMahon's reneging on his promise of original programming for the WTBS time slot, made two moves to correct the problem. Firstly, he offered Ole Anderson, who had refused to sell his minority interest in GCW to McMahon and instead formed a successor promotion known as Championship Wrestling from Georgia (CWG), a 7:00 a.m. time slot on Saturday mornings. He then gave Bill Watts, the owner of Mid-South Wrestling, a one-hour time slot on Sundays. These moves upset McMahon, who had assumed that the WWF would be the sole provider of professional wrestling content on WTBS with his purchase of GCW. Turner disagreed, citing McMahon's aforementioned breaking of his promise to provide original WWF programming for the WTBS time slot.

==== Under Jim Crockett Promotions (1985–1988) ====
World Championship Wrestling logo, as seen from the opening sequence used from 1982 to 1987.

The decline in ratings for the WWF's Saturday evening show, and the fans clamoring for GCW, began to make the WWF's foray onto WTBS one that lost the federation money. Eventually, McMahon cut his losses and sold the former GCW time slot to Jim Crockett Promotions (JCP) for $1 million in March 1985. The final WWF produced edition of World Championship Wrestling aired on March 30, 1985. JCP's first edition of World Championship Wrestling aired on April 6, 1985.

JCP, based in Charlotte, North Carolina, and run by Jim Crockett, Jr., was, like CWG and Mid-South, a member of the National Wrestling Alliance (NWA) and ran NWA-branded shows in Virginia and the Carolinas. Crockett's first order of business was to merge his promotion with CWG, thus allowing his wrestlers to compete on CWG's Saturday morning WTBS time slot and vice versa. This deal (which former Georgia Championship Wrestling promoter Jim Barnett helped broker), however, forced the elimination of the Mid-South Wrestling program from the WTBS schedule. Bill Watts ended up selling his promotion (by then known as the Universal Wrestling Federation) to Crockett in 1987. JCP retained the World Championship Wrestling name. Crockett filled the time slot with two hours of original programming filmed in Turner's Atlanta studios.

==== Turner buyout ====
The November 5, 1988, edition of World Championship Wrestling featured "Nature Boy" Ric Flair addressing the crowd and pointing out a large group of Turner Broadcasting executives in attendance. This was a subtle nod to Turner Broadcasting purchasing the assets of Jim Crockett Promotions after the latter had run into financial distress. Ted Turner did not want to lose the consistently high ratings of the Saturday program. This episode launched World Championship Wrestling as a promotion, which initially continued to operate as a member of the NWA. On this first program, the Jim Cornette–Paul E. Dangerously feud took center stage as their dueling versions of the well-known tag team Midnight Express commenced an intense feud that would last until the following February.

=== WCW Saturday Night (1992–2000) ===
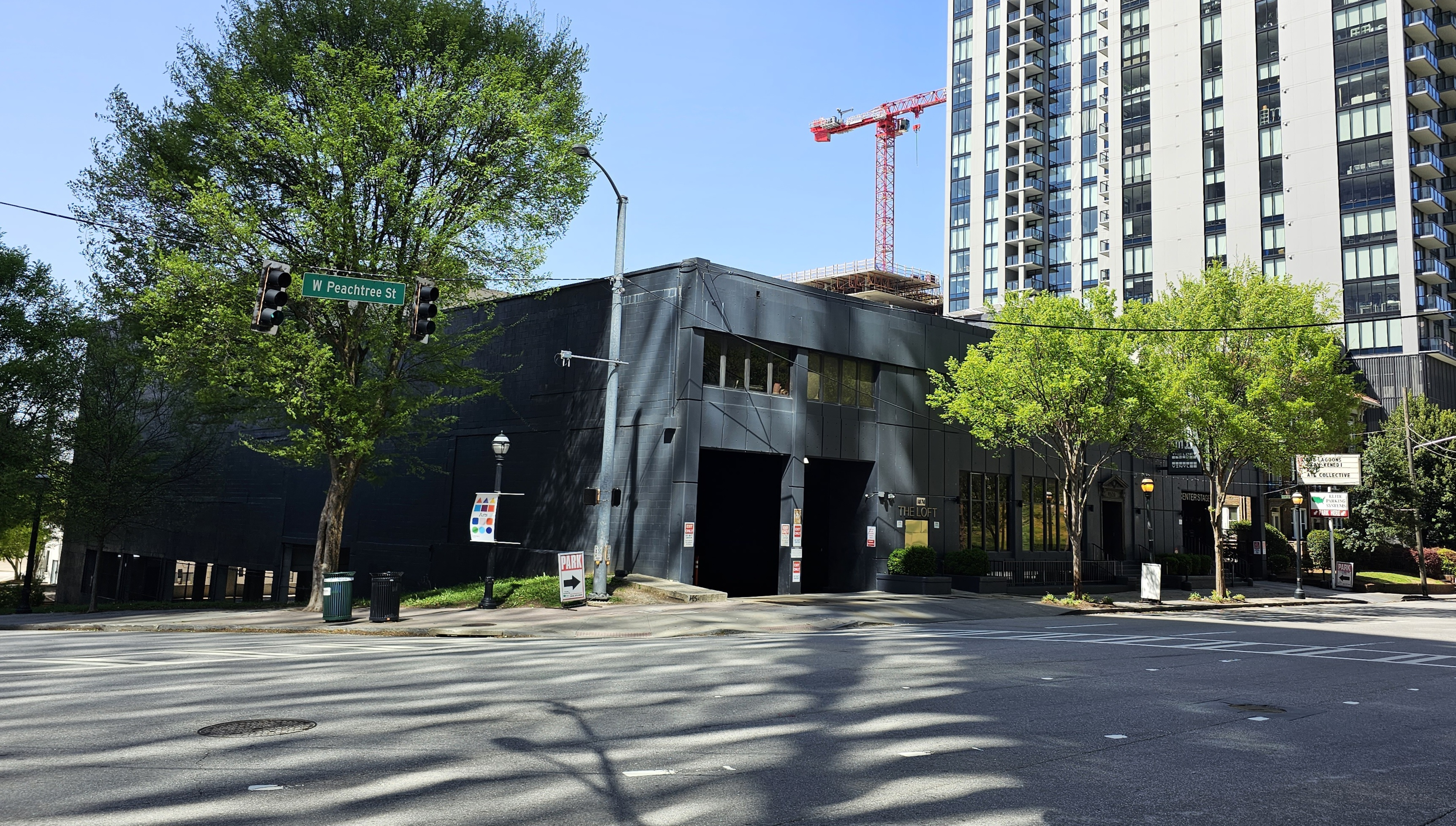
Center Stage, a common venue for show tapings

World Championship Wrestling would be renamed WCW Saturday Night on April 4, 1992. This reflected an overhauled look and a new home studio-arena at the Center Stage Theater in Atlanta, with matches taking place in Gainesville, Georgia. The show would return having matches at Center Stage on April 18. The show was presented in a "neon" style, with a blue and pink color scheme. Neon signs displayed the show's logo, and the wrestlers entered through a silver mylar curtain. The show was given a new look again in March 1994, with a futuristic design with a unique entry way of slide-open doors and billowing smoke as the performers made their way to the ring.

When the show originally premiered, it was hosted by Jim Ross and Jesse Ventura. Bruno Sammartino also appeared sporadically as a guest color commentator during certain weeks in 1992. Tony Schiavone took over the hosting duties following Ross' departure for the WWF in 1993 and remained until 1998. Bobby Heenan would replace Ventura after joining WCW in the beginning of 1994. Dusty Rhodes, who affectionately referred to Saturday Night as "The Mothership", replaced him in 1995 and continued until January 1998. Rhodes and Schiavone were removed from the broadcast so Schiavone could focus on his other broadcasting duties and Rhodes could take a managerial role after having turned heel, joining the New World Order. They were replaced by Scott Hudson and Mike Tenay, who was later replaced with Larry Zbyszko. Gene Okerlund often handled interviews after he joined WCW in 1993, as did Tenay, Schiavone, and Lee Marshall.

In the summer of 1996, WCW Saturday Night was taped at WCW Pro's Disney–MGM Studios set in Orlando, Florida due to all of Turner's mobile production units being used by other broadcasters for the 1996 Summer Olympics in Atlanta.

==== Live episodes ====
Episodes of WCW Saturday Night were usually filmed well in advance, with the exception of three live editions.

The first live episode aired on July 9, 1994. Sting wrestled Ric Flair as voted on by fans. Hulk Hogan made his first in-studio appearance, and he and Sting were attacked by Sherri Martel.

The second aired from downtown Charlotte, North Carolina, on May 27, 1995. It started raining halfway through the outdoor show, causing the ring mat to become slippery at times.

The third live airing, again outdoors, took place on August 10, 1996, from the Sturgis Motorcycle Rally in Sturgis, South Dakota. The show took place right before the Hog Wild pay-per-view event, which was held on a Saturday night instead of the usual Sunday night slot for WCW pay-per-views. Hence, WCW Saturday Night was used as a lead-in to the pay-per-view show, much like WCW Main Event was used as a lead-in for Sunday pay-per-views until 1996.

==== Decline and end (1998–2000) ====
When WCW introduced the live program Monday Nitro on TNT in September 1995, the pre-taped Saturday Night became secondary in importance. When Thunder premiered in January 1998, Saturday Night became WCW's third-tier program. The majority of airtime would be used to display up-and-comers and recent graduates of the WCW Power Plant (with the occasional squash match) as well as recapping the major events of the other shows. The main event would often feature mid-card performers such as the current Cruiserweight Champion, Television Champion, or U.S. Heavyweight Champion in a non-title match. Hudson, Tenay, Zsbysko and Marshall manned commentating and locker room interviewing duties throughout this period. Backstage, "Mean Gene" Okerlund would regularly promote his WCW Hotline which provided fans with insider information on recent events in the company.

On April 1, 2000, WCW Saturday Night aired its final episode under its traditional format; one week later, it became a recap show and no longer featured exclusive matches. On July 1, 2000, the show was re-titled WCW Saturday Morning and moved from its established evening timeslot to a late morning timeslot. The show was canceled one month later as a result of low viewership. The last episode aired on August 19, 2000, seven months before WCW was bought out by the WWF and closed its doors entirely. The cancellation of WCW Saturday Night on a Turner-owned network would be the end of professional wrestling in its Saturday night timeslot on TBS until the premiere of AEW Collision on its sister channel TNT on June 17, 2023.

== Title changes ==
Throughout the years, WCW Saturday Night has had numerous title changes.

- Sam Houston defeated Krusher Kruchsev to win the NWA Mid-Atlantic Heavyweight Championship (January 11, 1986)
- Rick Rude and Manny Fernandez defeated The Rock 'n' Roll Express (Ricky Morton and Robert Gibson) to win the NWA World Tag Team Championship (December 6, 1986)
- Dick Murdoch and Ivan Koloff defeated Ron Garvin and Barry Windham to win the NWA United States Tag Team Championship on March 14, 1987 (live show)
- The Midnight Express (Bobby Eaton and Stan Lane) defeated Ron Garvin and Barry Windham in a tournament final to win the NWA United States Tag Team Championship on May 16, 1987 (live show)
- The Steiner Brothers (Rick Steiner and Scott Steiner) defeated The Fabulous Freebirds (Jimmy Garvin and Michael Hayes) to win the NWA World Tag Team Championship on November 18, 1989 (taped November 1, 1989)
- Tom Zenk defeated Arn Anderson to win the NWA World Television Championship on December 29, 1990 (taped December 4, 1990)
- The Patriots (Todd Champion and Firebreaker Chip) defeated The Fabulous Freebirds (Jimmy Garvin and Michael Hayes) to win the WCW United States Tag Team Championship on September 7, 1991 (taped August 12, 1991)
- Greg Valentine and Terry Taylor defeated Ron Simmons and Big Josh to win the WCW United States Tag Team Championship on February 29, 1992 (taped February 17, 1992)
- Barry Windham defeated Steve Austin in a two out of three falls match to win the WCW World Television Championship on May 9, 1992 (taped April 27, 1992)
- Dustin Rhodes and Barry Windham defeated Steve Williams and Terry Gordy to win the NWA and WCW World Tag Team Championships on October 3, 1992 (taped September 21, 1992)
- Dustin Rhodes defeated Ricky Steamboat in a tournament final to win the vacant WCW United States Heavyweight Championship on January 16, 1993 (taped January 11, 1993)
- Dustin Rhodes defeated Rick Rude in the final match of the best-of-three series for the vacant WCW United States Heavyweight Championship on September 11, 1993 (taped August 30, 1993)
- 2 Cold Scorpio and Marcus Bagwell defeated The Nasty Boys (Brian Knobbs and Jerry Sags) to win the WCW World Tag Team Championship on October 23, 1993 (taped October 4, 1993)
- Ric Flair defeated Ricky Steamboat in a Spring Stampede rematch to regain the held-up WCW World Heavyweight Championship on May 14, 1994 (taped April 21, 1994)
- Larry Zbyszko defeated Lord Steven Regal to win the WCW World Television Championship on May 28, 1994 (taped May 2, 1994)
- Harlem Heat (Booker T and Stevie Ray) defeated Stars and Stripes (The Patriot and Marcus Alexander Bagwell) to win the WCW World Tag Team Championship on January 14, 1995 (taped December 8, 1994)
- Dick Slater and Bunkhouse Buck defeated Harlem Heat (Booker T and Stevie Ray) to win the WCW World Tag Team Championship on July 22, 1995 (taped June 21, 1995)
- Harlem Heat (Booker T and Stevie Ray) defeated The American Males (Marcus Alexander Bagwell and Scotty Riggs) to win the WCW World Tag Team Championship on October 28, 1995 (taped September 27, 1995)
- Lex Luger defeated Johnny B. Badd to win the WCW World Television Championship on March 9, 1996 (taped March 6, 1996)
- Lord Steven Regal defeated Lex Luger to win the WCW World Television Championship on August 31, 1996 (taped August 20, 1996)
- Harlem Heat (Booker T and Stevie Ray) defeated Public Enemy (Rocco Rock and Johnny Grunge) to win the WCW World Tag Team Championship on October 5, 1996 (taped October 1, 1996)
- Chris Jericho defeated Alex Wright to win the WCW World Cruiserweight Championship on August 16, 1997 (taped August 12, 1997)
