= Road Wild (1999) =

1999 World Championship Wrestling pay-per-view event

- Promotional poster featuring Goldberg
- Promotion: World Championship Wrestling
- Date: August 14, 1999
- City: Sturgis, South Dakota
- Venue: Sturgis Motorcycle Rally
- Attendance: 5,500
- Buy rate: 235,000
- Tagline: It'll Take More Than Attitude To Ride Outta Here.

Pay-per-view chronology
← Previous; Bash at the Beach	Next → Fall Brawl

Road Wild chronology
← Previous; 1998	Next → Final

The 1999 Road Wild was the fourth and final Road Wild professional wrestling pay-per-view (PPV) event produced by World Championship Wrestling (WCW). It took place on August 14, 1999, from the Sturgis Motorcycle Rally in Sturgis, South Dakota.

In the main event, Hulk Hogan defeated Kevin Nash in a retirement match to retain the WCW World Heavyweight Championship, forcing Nash to retire from professional wrestling. Nash would come out of retirement in late 1999. This was Hogan's fourth straight Road Wild main event match. Other important matches on the card featured Randy Savage defeating Dennis Rodman, Goldberg defeating Rick Steiner, Sid Vicious defeating Sting and Chris Benoit retained the WCW United States Heavyweight Championship against Diamond Dallas Page in a No Disqualification match. The event also featured Filthy Animals vs. Dead Pool and The Revolution vs. The West Texas Rednecks.

== Storylines ==
The event featured wrestlers from pre-existing scripted feuds and storylines. Wrestlers portrayed villains, heroes, or less distinguishable characters in the scripted events that built tension and culminated in a wrestling match or series of matches.

== Event ==
Other on-screen personnel
Role:	Name:
Commentators	Tony Schiavone
Commentators	Bobby Heenan
Commentators	Mike Tenay
Interviewer	Gene Okerlund
Ring announcers	Michael Buffer
Ring announcers	David Penzer
Referees	Johnny Boone
Referees	Scott Dickinson
Referees	Mickie Jay
Referees	Nick Patrick
Referees	Charles Robinson
Referees	Billy Silverman

Fit Finlay was scheduled to face Jimmy Hart's First Family, but Finlay suffered a severe injury prior to the event. A match scheduled between Madusa and Mona also did not take place without any official reason given.

== Reception ==
In 2011, Jack Bramma of 411Mania gave the event a rating of 4.5 [Poor], stating, "The dredges of mediocrity. WCW had over a year left but they were already losing significant steam by this point. I think the idea of an outdoor PPV at Sturgis could have been a lot of fun but most of the work here is just bad to average and the booking is ass. Maybe watch the 6 man tag to see some fine attention to detail from Hennig or the DDP-Benoit encounter if you don't want to see the three-ways with Raven from a couple of years prior."

== Results ==
No.	Results	Stipulations	Times
1	Rey Misterio, Jr., Billy Kidman and Eddie Guerrero defeated Vampiro and Insane Clown Posse (Violent J and Shaggy 2 Dope)	Six-man tag team match	12:22
2	Harlem Heat (Booker T and Stevie Ray) defeated Kanyon and Bam Bam Bigelow (c)	Tag team match for the WCW World Tag Team Championship	13:06
3	The Revolution (Perry Saturn, Shane Douglas and Dean Malenko) defeated The West Texas Rednecks (Barry Windham, Curt Hennig and Bobby Duncum Jr.) (with Kendall Windham)	Six-man tag team match	10:57
4	Buff Bagwell defeated Ernest Miller (with Sonny Onoo)	Singles match	07:24
5	Chris Benoit (c) defeated Diamond Dallas Page	No Disqualification match for the WCW United States Heavyweight Championship	12:14
6	Sid Vicious defeated Sting	Singles match	10:40
7	Goldberg defeated Rick Steiner	Singles match	05:39
8	Randy Savage defeated Dennis Rodman	Singles match	11:30
9	Hulk Hogan (c) defeated Kevin Nash	Retirement match for the WCW World Heavyweight Championship	12:18
(c) / – the champion(s) heading into the match
