= Road Wild (1998) =

1998 World Championship Wrestling pay-per-view event

- Promotion: World Championship Wrestling
- Brand(s): WCW nWo
- Date: August 8, 1998
- City: Sturgis, South Dakota
- Venue: Sturgis Motorcycle Rally
- Attendance: 8,500
- Buy rate: 365,000
- Tagline: Road Fast. Road Hard. No One Knows Where This Road Goes.

Pay-per-view chronology
| ← Previous; Bash at the Beach | Next → Fall Brawl |

Road Wild chronology
| ← Previous; 1997 | Next → 1999 |

The 1998 Road Wild was the third Road Wild professional wrestling pay-per-view (PPV) event produced by World Championship Wrestling (WCW) and co-promoted by WCW and nWo in storyline. It took place on August 8, 1998, from the Sturgis Motorcycle Rally in Sturgis, South Dakota. The event also featured a mini-concert by Travis Tritt after the wrestling matches.

The main event was a tag team match in which Diamond Dallas Page and the host of The Tonight Show, Jay Leno defeated the leader of nWo Hollywood, Hollywood Hogan and Eric Bischoff when Leno pinned Bischoff after Kevin Eubanks delivered a Diamond Cutter to Bischoff. On the undercard, nWo held an invitational battle royal, in which four members of nWo Hollywood and nWo Wolfpac participated along with Goldberg, who won the match by last eliminating The Giant.

== Storylines ==
Road Wild featured nine professional wrestling matches that resulted from scripted storylines and had results predetermined by WCW played out on WCW's television programs Monday Nitro, Thunder, Saturday Night and WorldWide.

On the July 16 episode of Thunder, The Dancing Fools defeated The Public Enemy after Dancing Fools' associated member Tokyo Magnum was driven through a table and caused the distraction for Dancing Fools to pick up the win, setting up a rematch between the two teams at Road Wild.

== Reception ==
The event was panned by critics.

In 2007, Arnold Furious of 411Mania gave the event a rating of 2.5 [Very Bad], stating, "WCW’s big idea to push for buyrates worked once. This second time out wasn’t so good, money wise. The Leno appearance was actually more entertaining than the basketball players but didn’t pop the same buyrate. I think they missed the point of their direction. Goldberg was world champion but the focus remained on Hogan who the crowd had grown tired of seeing. The undercard had some real horrors on it as well. Two matches sunk well into negative stars for their severe lack of professionalism. When you consider the WWF at the same time was building new characters and creating their own stars (Summerslam that followed this had Triple H-Rock’s big breakout ladder match) WCW looks even worse by comparison. Jericho-Juvi is good but WCW would soon wreck Jericho. Everything else is bad. Four matches are real shockers. That poor level of professionalism just isn’t acceptable. If I’d have been in charge there would have been heads rolling over this. Keep in mind this being Road Wild this show had no money taken at the gate. Another of those bright WCW decisions. Yeah, charging fans to watch your show is pretty straightforward. Most people understand this. Everyone but WCW really. Keeping in mind this is on the back of a Nitro where they showed the entire PPV main event from Bash at the Beach for free. Just to make that huge PPV number shrink in future as fans were outraged they paid to see a match that was then given away. This show is one long string of bad matches and bad booking. Only Jericho’s match is worth watching and its shocking that Jay Leno’s match isn’t the worst on the card by a long shot. Avoid."

The event generated 365,000 ppv buys.

Other on-screen personnel
| Role: | Name: |
|---|---|
| Commentators | Tony Schiavone |
| Commentators | Bobby Heenan |
| Commentators | Mike Tenay |
| Interviewer | Gene Okerlund |
| Ring announcers | David Penzer |
| Ring announcers | Michael Buffer |
| Referees | Scott Dickinson |
| Referees | Mickie Jay |
| Referees | Nick Patrick |
| Referees | Charles Robinson |
| Referees | Billy Silverman |

== Results ==
| No. | Results | Stipulations | Times |
|---|---|---|---|
| 1 | Meng defeated The Barbarian (with Jimmy Hart) | Singles match | 04:48 |
| 2 | The Public Enemy (Rocco Rock and Johnny Grunge) defeated The Dancing Fools (Disco Inferno and Alex Wright) (with Tokyo Magnum) | Tag team match | 15:27 |
| 3 | Perry Saturn defeated Chris Kanyon and Raven (with Lodi) | Raven's Rules match | 12:26 |
| 4 | Rey Misterio, Jr. defeated Psychosis | Singles match | 13:38 |
| 5 | Stevie Ray (c) defeated Chavo Guerrero Jr. | Singles match for the WCW World Television Championship | 02:38 |
| 6 | Steve McMichael defeated Brian Adams (with Vincent) | Singles match | 06:32 |
| 7 | Juventud Guerrera defeated Chris Jericho (c) | Singles match for the WCW Cruiserweight Championship with Dean Malenko as special guest referee | 16:24 |
| 8 | Goldberg won by last eliminating The Giant | nWo Invitational Battle Royal | 07:58 |
| 9 | Diamond Dallas Page and Jay Leno (with Kevin Eubanks) defeated Hollywood Hogan and Eric Bischoff (with The Disciple and Miss Elizabeth) | Tag team match | 14:31 |
(c) / – the champion(s) heading into the match

=== Battle royal eliminations ===
| Elimination no. | Wrestler | Eliminated by | Elimination move | Time |
|---|---|---|---|---|
| 1 | Scott Hall | Goldberg | Over the top rope via an Outsider's Edge countered into a Back body drop | 1:24 |
| 2 | Kevin Nash | N/A | Nash eliminated himself to fight Hall | 1:31 |
| 3 | Konnan | Goldberg | Over the top rope after a spear | 4:55 |
| 4 | Curt Hennig | Goldberg | Over the top rope after a spear | 6:42 |
| 5 | Sting | Goldberg | Over the top rope | 6:49 |
| 6 | Scott Norton | Goldberg | Over the top rope | 6:50 |
| 7 | Lex Luger | The Giant | Over the top rope after a spear by Goldberg | 7:09 |
| 8 | The Giant | Goldberg | Pinfall after a Jackhammer | 7:58 |
| Winner: | Goldberg | | | |
