= Submarining =

Submarining may mean in:

- Engineering sciences, the design, construction and use of submarines
- Cars (in the 1960s), when a driver or passenger slides forward under a loosely fitted seat belt
- Wrestling, a term used in Road Wild (1997)
- Online dating (since 2017), staying away for weeks or months and suddenly reappearing ( "resurfacing" ), mostly neither mentioning the absence nor giving an explanation and not even trying to ask for an excuse; similar to ghosting
