= Dave Sirulnick =

American television producer (born 1964)

Dave Sirulnick (born May 26, 1964) is an American television producer.

== Early life and education ==
Sirulnick grew up in Teaneck, New Jersey, where he attended Teaneck High School and became involved with booking musicians such as LL Cool J, Run DMC, and Salt-N-Pepa at The Rink, a roller rink in nearby Bergenfield. He later attended Rutgers University. After graduating, he was hired as a news producer at CNN, like his father who was also a television producer.

== Career ==
In 1987, he joined MTV, saying they "wanted someone to grow their news department. It's what I wanted my whole life: TV, music and news". He eventually became the executive vice president for Multiplatform Production, News and Music at MTV. Sirulnick's responsibilities included oversight of MTV's signature show, Total Request Live. Half of MTV's programming had been within his job functions.. In March 2015, he and others were dismissed from their positions at MTV by Viacom, the parent corporation.

As of January 2019, Sirulnick is a partner at RadicalMedia.

== Television and film credits ==
Year	Television and Films	Credited as			
Year	Television and Films	Director	Producer	Writer	Other notes
2012	Caged		Yes		
2010	MTV Video Music Awards		Yes		
2010	My Life as Liz		Yes		
2010	Drake: Better Than Good Enough		Yes		TV documentary
2010	When I Was 17		Yes		TV series documentary
2010	Summit On The Summit		Yes		TV documentary
2010	Teen Cribs		Yes		
2009	Made		Yes		
2009	MTV Video Music Awards 2009		Yes		
2009	Get Schooled: You have the Right	Yes	Yes	Yes	Creator
2009	It's On With Alexa Chung		Yes		
2009	Steve-O: Demise and Rise		Yes		TV documentary
2009	Be The Change Inaugural Ball		Yes		TV movie
2009	Get Schooled	Yes	Yes	Yes	Creator
2008	FNMTV Premiers		Yes		
2008	MTV Goes Gold: New Year's Eve 2007		Yes		TV movie
2008	Total Final Live		Yes		
2008	MTV Video Music Awards 2008		Yes		
2008	Jonas Brothers: Live & Mobile		Yes		TV movie
2008	Kanye West Homecoming Special		Yes		TV documentary
2007	One Upon a Prom 2007		Yes		TV movie
2007	MTV Goes Gold: New Years Eve 2007		Yes		TV movie
2007	Engaged & Underaged		Yes		
2007	Two-A-Days: Hoover High		Yes		
2007	Tiara Girls		Yes		
2005	MTV Video Music Awards 2005		Yes		
2004	The Shady National Convention		Yes		TV Special
2004	Laguna Beach: The Real Orange County		Yes		
2004	MTV Movie Awards 2004		Yes		
2004	This is my Band: D12		Yes		TV documentary
2004	I Want A Famous Face		Yes		
2004	MTV Backstage at the Grammys		Yes		
2003	MC Battle II: The Takeover in Times Square		Yes		TV movie
2003	All Eyes On: Britney Spears		Yes		TV documentary
2003	MTV Movie Awards 2003		Yes		
2003	Snoop To The Extreme		Yes		TV movie
2003	MTV News: The Social History of the Hair		Yes		TV documentary Short
2003	MTV News: The Social History of the Piercing		Yes		TV documentary Short
2003	MTV Icon: Metallica		Yes		TV Special
2003	MTV Backstage at the Grammys		Yes		TV special
2002	MTV Video Music Awards		Yes		
2002	Diary Presents: WMA Superstars		Yes		TV movie
2002	MTV Movie Awards 2001 Pre-Show		Yes		
2002	MTV News: The Social History of the Moshpit		Yes		TV movie
2002	MTV Fashionable Loud: Sports Illustrated Edition		Yes		TV movie
2002	Be Heard: An MTV Global Discussion with Colin Powell		Yes		TV movie
2002	MTV Mardi Gras 2002		Yes		
2002	Stung		Yes		TV movie
2002	MTV Icon: Aerosmith		Yes		TV documentary
2001	The Life Of Aaliyah		Yes		
2001	MTV 20: Live & Almost Legal		Yes		TV documentary
2001	U2 on Tour: Leaving Nothing Behind		Yes		TV documentary
2001	Camp Scott Lock-Up		Yes		TV documentary
2001	MTV Movie Awards 2001 Pre-Show		Yes		TV Special
2001	All Eyes On		Yes		
2001	MTV Fashionable Loud: Spring Break, Cancun 2001		Yes		TV movie
2001	MTV Icon: Janet Jackson		Yes		TV Special Documentary
2001	Rage Against The Machine: The Battle of Mexico City		Yes		Video documentary
2001	Super Bowl XXXV Half-time show		Yes		
2001	TRL Super Bowl		Yes		TV movie
2001	Frontline Television News				Himself
2000	MTV Video Music Awards Opening Act		Yes		TV Special
2000	Choose Or Lose 2000: Why Care?		Yes		TV documentary
2000	MTV Movie Awards 2000 Pre-Show		Yes		TV Special
2000	Wanna Be A VJ 3		Yes		TV Special
2000	MTV Fashionable Loud: Spring Break, Cancun 2000		Yes		TV movie
2000	MTV Backstage at the Grammys		Yes		TV Special
2000	MTV Video Music Awards 2000		Yes		
2000	The Lowdown		Yes		
1999	MTV New Years Eve Live 1999		Yes		
1999	Wanna Be A VJ Too		Yes		TV Special
1999	MTV Uncensored		Yes		TV documentary
1999	Alanis T.V.		Yes		TV Special
1999	Mansion T.V.		Yes		TV Special
1999	Dre TV		Yes		TV special
1999	MTV Fashionable Loud: Miami		Yes		TV movie
1999	MTV 2 Large: New Years Eve 2000		Yes		TV Special
1998	MTV New Years Eve 1998		Yes		TV documentary
1998	Beastieography		Yes		TV special
1998	True Life		Yes		1998–2009
