= Road Wild (1997) =

1997 World Championship Wrestling pay-per-view event

- Promotion: World Championship Wrestling
- Date: August 9, 1997
- City: Sturgis, South Dakota
- Venue: Sturgis Motorcycle Rally
- Attendance: 6,500
- Buy rate: 240,000
- Tagline: It's Gonna Be Wild

Pay-per-view chronology
← Previous; Bash at the Beach	Next → Fall Brawl

Road Wild chronology
← Previous; 1996	Next → 1998

The 1997 Road Wild was the second Road Wild professional wrestling pay-per-view (PPV) event produced by World Championship Wrestling (WCW) and the first to be produced under the Road Wild name. It took place on August 9, 1997 from the Sturgis Motorcycle Rally in Sturgis, South Dakota.

In the main event, Hollywood Hogan defeated Lex Luger to win the WCW World Heavyweight Championship, which marked for the second straight year that Hogan won the title at the event. In other important matches on the undercard, The Outsiders retained the World Tag Team Championship against The Steiner Brothers, Curt Hennig defeated Diamond Dallas Page and Ric Flair defeated Syxx.

== Storylines ==
The event featured wrestlers from pre-existing scripted feuds and storylines. Wrestlers portrayed villains, heroes, or less distinguishable characters in the scripted events that built tension and culminated in a wrestling match or series of matches.

== Reception ==
Jack Bramma of 411mania rated the event 4 out of 10 stars and rated it a poor event, stating "It's hard not to feel like the entire show is an afterthought and a waste of time to everyone involved. Not one match other than Rey/Konnan manages to be even competently executed and that one is a bit of a drag because it's all psychology instead of lucha flips in the one place it would make sense. Instead, it's just every name on the roster going through the motions and the booking actively [submarining] Lex as a marquee guy. The "spectacle" of the outdoor show is worth a look, I guess, but nothing is really good or even epically bad to justify hate watching. Take a pass."

Other on-screen personnel
Role:	Name:
Commentators	Tony Schiavone
Commentators	Bobby Heenan
Commentators	Dusty Rhodes
Interviewer	Gene Okerlund
Ring announcers	Michael Buffer
Ring announcers	David Penzer
Referees	Randy Anderson
Referees	Mark Curtis
Referees	Scott Dickinson
Referees	Mickie Jay
Referees	Nick Patrick

== Results ==
No.	Results	Stipulations	Times
1	Harlem Heat (Booker T and Stevie Ray) defeated Vicious and Delicious (Buff Bagwell and Scott Norton) (with Vincent)	Tag team match	10:20
2	Konnan defeated Rey Misterio Jr. by submission	Mexican Death match	10:20
3	Steve McMichael and Chris Benoit defeated Jeff Jarrett and Dean Malenko (with Debra)	Elimination match	09:36
4	Alex Wright (c) defeated Chris Jericho	Singles match for the WCW Cruiserweight Championship	13:03
5	Ric Flair defeated Syxx	Singles match	11:06
6	Curt Hennig defeated Diamond Dallas Page (with Kimberly Page)	Singles match	09:41
7	The Giant defeated Randy Savage (with Miss Elizabeth)	Singles match	06:05
8	The Steiner Brothers (Rick Steiner and Scott Steiner) (with Ted DiBiase) defeated The Outsiders (Scott Hall and Kevin Nash) (c) by disqualification	Tag team match for the WCW World Tag Team Championship	15:29
9	Hollywood Hogan defeated Lex Luger (c)	Singles match for the WCW World Heavyweight Championship	16:15
(c) / – the champion(s) heading into the match

=== Benoit/McMichael vs. Jarrett/Malenko eliminations ===
Elimination no.	Wrestler	Team	Eliminated by	Elimination move	Time
1	Jeff Jarrett	Jarrett/Malenko	Steve McMichael	Pinned after Jarrett delivered a Jawbreaker on McMichael and put McMichael on top of himself	7:10
2	Dean Malenko	Jarrett/Malenko	Steve McMichael	Mongo Spike	9:36
Winners:	Chris Benoit and Steve McMichael (The Four Horsemen)				
