= American Males =

Professional wrestling tag team

Tag team
- Members: Marcus Bagwell; Scotty Riggs
- Billed heights: Bagwell: 6 ft 1 in (1.85 m); Riggs: 6 ft 0 in (1.83 m)
- Combined billed weight: 460 lb (210 kg)
- Billed from: Georgia
- Debut: August 1995
- Disbanded: November 1996

The American Males were a professional wrestling tag team in World Championship Wrestling (WCW) composed of Marcus Bagwell and Scotty Riggs. Their gimmick was of two "pretty boys" who were fond of their own bodies and popular with women. Riggs was Bagwell's third partner with whom he won the WCW World Tag Team Championship, the previous two being 2 Cold Scorpio and The Patriot. The American Males won the tag team title soon after they began teaming together but soon dropped the belts back to Harlem Heat, the previous champions. Bagwell and Riggs did not return to main-event status, and they eventually split up and feuded with each other.

== History ==
=== Background ===
Marcus Bagwell had competed in the tag team division in WCW since 1993, during which time he held the WCW World Tag Team Championship with two different partners. Teaming with 2 Cold Scorpio, he held the title belts for three weeks. He later won the title twice more while teaming with The Patriot, a team that was dubbed Stars and Stripes due to the patriotic theme both wrestlers were using at the time. After being left behind by both partners, he expressed a desire to form a new tag team to challenge for the title again. According to WCW's storylines, his former partners believed that he was too demanding, and he was unable to find anyone interested in teaming with him due to his reputation as being "difficult to work with".

=== Formation ===
The team was formed in August 1995 when Scott Antol signed a WCW contract and was placed with "tag team specialist" Marcus Alexander Bagwell. In the process, both men changed their ring names, Antol changing his last name to "Riggs" and Bagwell shortening his name to simply Marcus Bagwell. Once together, they both wore short shorts and leather vests (later wrestling tights and suspenders) to the ring and began clapping their hands over their head in time with their entrance music, which sang their praises between choruses of the team name being repeated over and over. They wrestled on the first episode of Nitro, defeating World Tag Team Champions Dick Slater and Bunkhouse Buck in a non-title match. Their first major appearance together came at the Fall Brawl pay-per-view, where they defeated The Nasty Boys in a match that aired on Main Event. Pro Wrestling Illustrated magazine stated that the team "work[ed] well as a unit and could soon challenge for the belts". Bagwell commented on the team in a scripted interview, saying that he believed that his previous tag teams had failed because they were in a rush to win the title belts and that he planned to work slowly toward a title victory with Riggs.

=== World Tag Team Champions ===
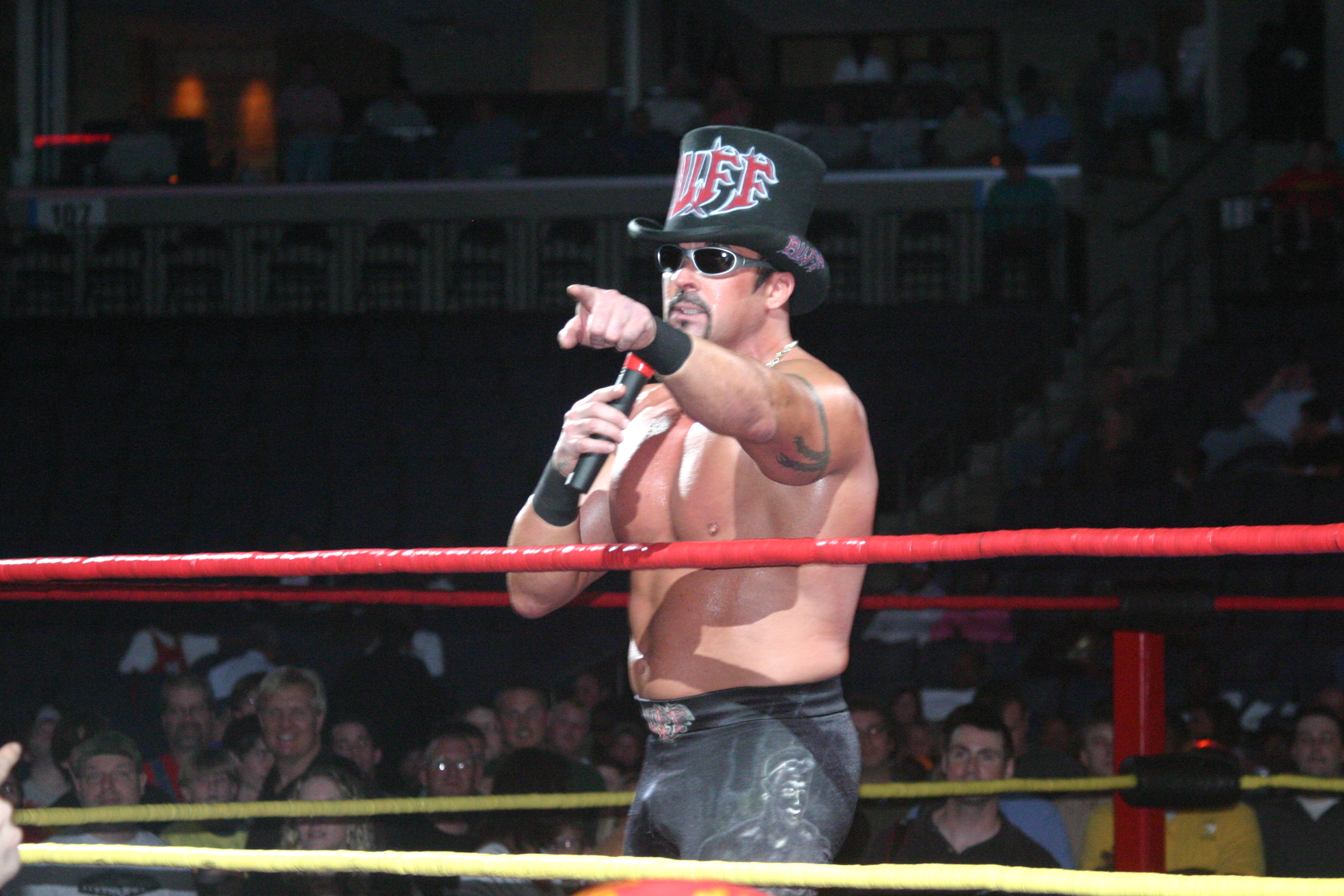
Marcus Bagwell in his post-American Males "Buff Bagwell" persona.

On the episode of Nitro after Fall Brawl, Riggs and Bagwell won the World Tag Team Championship after defeating then-champions Harlem Heat (Booker T and Stevie Ray) in an upset win in an impromptu match. The American Males had been scheduled to face The Blue Bloods, but Harlem Heat attacked both members of the Blue Bloods prior to the match and volunteered to take their place. As champions, the pair defeated Harlem Heat and the team of Dick Slater and Bunkhouse Buck. However, Bagwell and Riggs lost the titles back to Harlem Heat a month later on 10-29-95 Saturday Night. The American Males remained top challengers for the title belts for the rest of 1995, but were unable to regain the championship from Harlem Heat.

By the end of 1995, The American Males were no longer being pushed by WCW; they competed at Starrcade 1995 in a dark match and defeated The Blue Bloods. Through most of 1996, they competed in the tag team division with no major storylines and never reached the same heights as when they were champions. They were able to defeat other mid-card teams like the Faces of Fear, and they competed in a dark match prior to Slamboree 1996, defeating The Shark and Maxx. They were consistently defeated by the company's top tag teams, and Pro Wrestling Illustrated noted that they were getting lost in a "very deep" tag team division that included The Road Warriors, Public Enemy, Harlem Heat, The Nasty Boys, the Blue Bloods, Lex Luger and Sting, Four Horsemen, The Steiner Brothers, and The Outsiders, among others.

In October 1996, the team began showing signs of splitting, which intensified over the weeks. At World War 3 on November 24, 1996, the frustration came to a head as Bagwell attacked Riggs following both men's elimination from the three-ring battle royal that served as the main event.

The next night on Nitro Eric Bischoff, representing the New World Order (nWo) stable, informed all WCW wrestlers that they would become targets of the nWo if they did not join the group within 30 days. Bagwell and Riggs walked to the ring shortly after Bischoff's statement, with Bagwell looking to join and Riggs trying to talk him out of it. Bagwell decided to join the nWo, turning on Riggs and dissolving the team in the process. In a scripted interview, Bagwell stated, "Who needs Riggs anymore when I have the nWo?!" He also later stated that the team's lack of success after their first title reign was the fault of Riggs' ineptitude, stating "I couldn't make up for all his weaknesses."

=== Split ===
Following the breakup, the former partners feuded for a while with Bagwell getting the better of Riggs. Riggs would go on to briefly feud with Raven, later joining The Flock, while Bagwell formed Vicious and Delicious with Scott Norton before suffering a severe neck injury that kept him out of action for a while. Bagwell later returned to WCW, teaming with Shane Douglas to win another tag team championship. After losing the championship, he formed another tag team, pairing with Lex Luger to form Totally Buffed.

When Riggs joined Extreme Championship Wrestling in 2000 using the name Scotty Anton, he did a parody of the American Males gimmick by calling himself "The U.S. Male" and using their overhead clap taunt.

== Championships and accomplishments ==
- World Championship Wrestling
  - WCW World Tag Team Championship (1 time)
