= Road Wild =

Professional wrestling pay-per-view event

- Created by: Eric Bischoff
- Promotions: World Championship Wrestling
- First event: Hog Wild
- Last event: Road Wild (1999)

Road Wild (originally known as Hog Wild) was a professional wrestling pay-per-view (PPV) event produced by World Championship Wrestling (WCW) that was held in the month of August from 1996 to 1999. It was a free event held in Sturgis, South Dakota during the annual Sturgis Motorcycle Rally. After the first event, WCW changed the name to Road Wild because of a potential trademark issue with the Harley-Davidson club Harley Owners Group (HOG). In 2000, it was replaced by New Blood Rising. Hulk Hogan appeared in the main event of all four editions of the event.

Since 2001, WWE (through its subsidiary WCW, Inc.) owns the rights to the event. In 2015, all WCW pay-per-views were made available on the WWE Network.

== Road Wild dates and venues ==
WCW/nWo co-branded event

Event	Date	City	Venue	Main Event
Hog Wild	August 10, 1996	Sturgis, South Dakota	Sturgis Motorcycle Rally	The Giant (c) vs. Hollywood Hogan for the WCW World Heavyweight Championship
Road Wild (1997)	August 9, 1997	Sturgis, South Dakota	Sturgis Motorcycle Rally	Lex Luger (c) vs. Hollywood Hogan for the WCW World Heavyweight Championship
Road Wild (1998)	August 8, 1998	Sturgis, South Dakota	Sturgis Motorcycle Rally	Diamond Dallas Page and Jay Leno vs. Hollywood Hogan and Eric Bischoff
Road Wild (1999)	August 14, 1999	Sturgis, South Dakota	Sturgis Motorcycle Rally	Hulk Hogan (c) vs. Kevin Nash in a retirement match for the WCW World Heavyweight Championship
(c) – refers to the champion(s) heading into the match
