= Buff Bagwell =

American retired professional wrestler (born 1970)

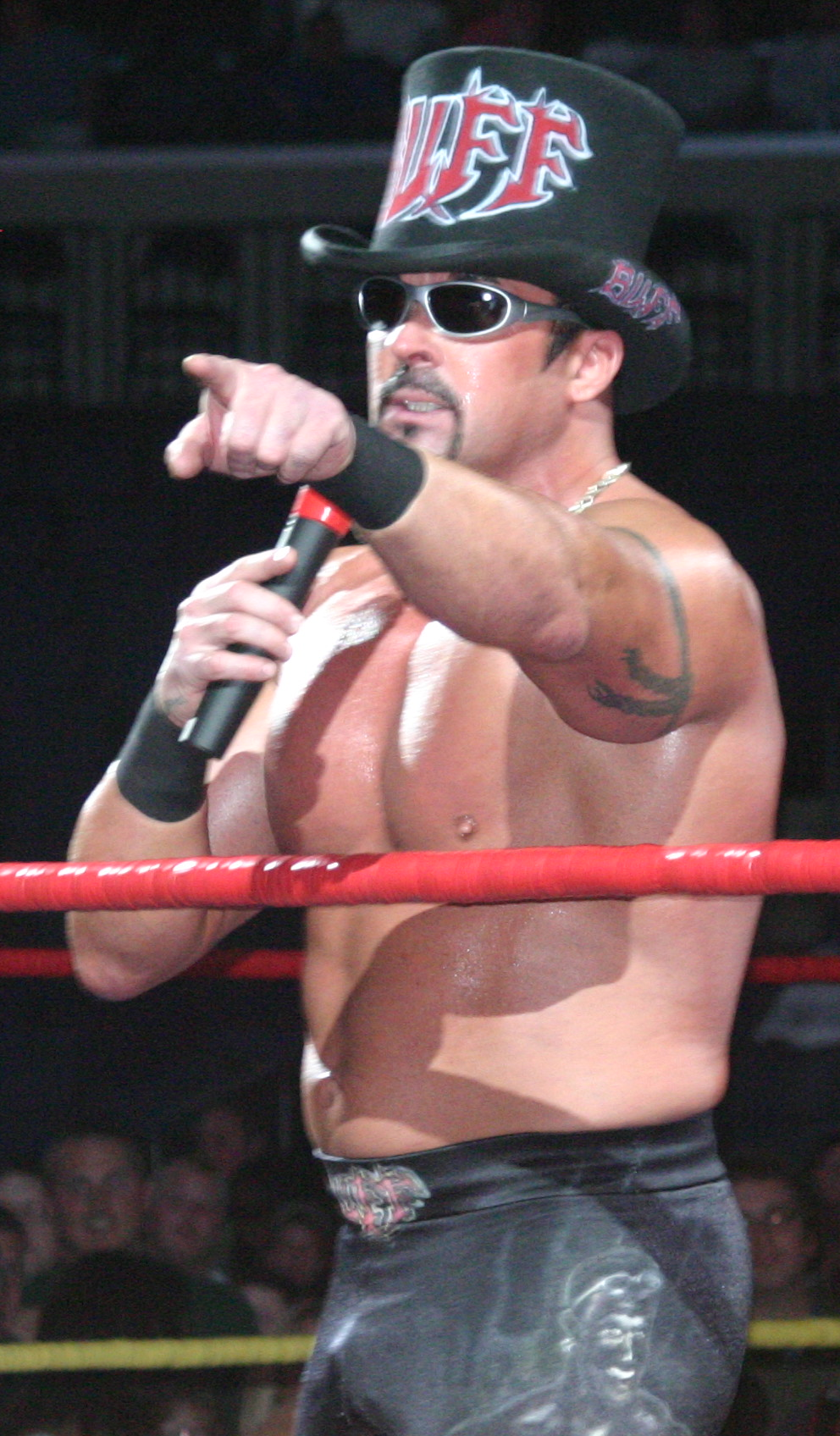
- Bagwell in 2006

Personal information
- Born: Marcus Alexander Bagwell; January 10, 1970 (age 56) Marietta, Georgia, U.S.
- Spouses: Alexis Rianja (m. 1988; div. 1994) Gabby Randallson (m. 1996; div. 2000)

Professional wrestling career
- Ring name(s): Buff Bagwell; Fabulous Fabian; The Handsome Stranger; Marcus Alexander Bagwell; Marcus Bagwell
- Billed height: 6 ft 1 in (185 cm)
- Billed weight: 245 lb (111 kg)
- Billed from: Marietta, Georgia
- Trained by: Dusty Rhodes; Mike Graham; Steve Lawler
- Debut: 1990
- Retired: April 21, 2024

Marcus Alexander Bagwell (born January 10, 1970) is an American retired professional wrestler better known by his ring name, Buff Bagwell. He is best known for his appearances with World Championship Wrestling (WCW) from 1991 to 2001, where he was a five-time World Tag Team Champion.

== Professional wrestling career ==
Missy Hyatt helped Bagwell break into the wrestling business. Growing up, Bagwell was a standout baseball player during his tenure in Sprayberry High School, and worked for his family's lumber company. Upon graduating from high school, he started an amateur boxing career. When the lumber company went bankrupt, Bagwell became a certified massage therapist before deciding to become a wrestler.

=== Early career (1990–1991) ===
He trained under Steve Lawler and debuted in 1990, working for North Georgia Wrestling as Fabulous Fabian. In 1991, he began wrestling with the Global Wrestling Federation (GWF) as The Handsome Stranger, a gimmick suggested by Demolition Ax that saw Bagwell don a Lone Ranger-style mask, and hand out roses to the female fans.

=== World Championship Wrestling (1991–2001) ===
==== Early years (1991–1992) ====
In 1991, Bagwell was hired by World Championship Wrestling, where he wrestled under his full name. Bagwell made his WCW debut on November 5 in a non-televised match, losing to Mike Graham. He would then wrestle a tryout match on November 11 and made his televised debut as a fan favorite at Clash of the Champions XVII, where he was interviewed by Missy Hyatt. He made his televised in-ring debut by defeating Rip Rogers on the December 14 episode of World Championship Wrestling. Bagwell made his pay-per-view debut at Starrcade, where he was paired with Jimmy Garvin against Michael Hayes and Tracy Smothers in a Lethal Lottery match, which he and Garvin won after Bagwell hit Smothers with the fisherman suplex to qualify for the Battlebowl battle royal later in the night, which Sting won. Bagwell received his first title shot on the January 11, 1992 episode of World Championship Wrestling against Steve Austin for the World Television Championship, but failed to win the title as the match ended in a ten-minute time limit draw. Bagwell would then begin feuding with the Terry Taylor, which led to a match between the two at SuperBrawl II, which Bagwell won.

Bagwell formed a tag team with Tom Zenk on the February 15 episode of World Championship Wrestling, to feud with Taylor and his partner Greg Valentine over the United States Tag Team Championship and received several title shots, but failed to win the titles. Bagwell would then lose a match to Scotty Flamingo at WrestleWar. The duo would participate in a tournament for the newly created NWA World Tag Team Championship, where they would lose to Rick Rude and Steve Austin in the first round at Clash of the Champions XIX. Bagwell would then face Greg Valentine in a losing effort at Beach Blast. Bagwell and Zenk would fail in several title shots and after limited success as a team, they split up quietly and focused on their singles careers. He would then form a short-lived tag team with Brad Armstrong for the remainder of the year until the two split up in early 1993.

==== World Tag Team Champion (1993–1996) ====
Bagwell participated in a tournament for the vacant World Television Championship on the February 20, 1993 episode of Worldwide, where he lost to Maxx Payne in the first round. On the February 20 episode of Saturday Night, Bagwell teamed with 2 Cold Scorpio and Steve Regal to defeat Scotty Flamingo, Tex Slazenger and Shanghai Pierce in a six-man tag team match. This would lead to the formation of a tag team of Bagwell and Scorpio. During this time, Bagwell began a feud with the Hollywood Blonds (Brian Pillman and Steve Austin), which led to Bagwell teaming with Erik Watts to take on The Hollywood Blonds in a tag team match at SuperBrawl III, which Bagwell's team lost. Bagwell resumed teaming with Scorpio and the team gained success unlike Bagwell's previous teams as they defeated various teams including Bobby Eaton and Chris Benoit at Slamboree, Tex Slazenger and Shanghai Pierce at Beach Blast and The Equalizer and Paul Orndorff at Fall Brawl. As a result of their success in the tag team division, they quickly became contenders for the World Tag Team Championship. On the October 23 episode of Saturday Night, Bagwell and Scorpio defeated the Nasty Boys to win the World Tag Team Championship, thus marking Bagwell's first title win in WCW. They lost the titles back to The Nasty Boys at Halloween Havoc.

Bagwell would be paired with Tex Slazenger against Rick Rude and Shanghai Pierce in a Battlebowl qualifying match at the Battlebowl pay-per-view on November 20, which Bagwell's team lost. Bagwell and Scorpio would then begin feuding with the newly formed team Pretty Wonderful, which led to a match at Starrcade, which Pretty Wonderful won. Bagwell and Scorpio defeated Pretty Wonderful in a rematch at Clash of the Champions XXVI to earn a title shot for the World Tag Team Championship against The Nasty Boys on the January 29, 1994 episode of Saturday Night, but failed in regaining the titles. Bagwell received his first world championship title shot on the final episode of Power Hour on March 5 against Rick Rude for the International World Heavyweight Championship, which he lost. Shortly after, Scorpio was released by WCW, thus dissolving Bagwell and Scorpio's tag team.

On the May 28 episode of Worldwide, Bagwell formed a new tag team with The Patriot called Stars and Stripes as they defeated Dick Slater and Chris Sullivan in their first match as a team. They were quickly put in contention for the World Tag Team Championship and entered a feud with the champions Pretty Wonderful over the titles. After losing to Pretty Wonderful in a title shot at Fall Brawl, Stars and Stripes defeated them in a rematch on the September 25 episode of Main Event to win the World Tag Team Championship, thus marking Bagwell's second reign with the title. They lost the titles back to Pretty Wonderful at Halloween Havoc but won the titles a second time at Clash of the Champions XXIX. They lost the titles to Harlem Heat on December 8, which aired on the January 14, 1995 episode of Saturday Night. Stars and Stripes failed in regaining the titles from Harlem Heat in rematches at Clash of the Champions XXX, the February 11 episode of Saturday Night and the March 5 episode of WorldWide.

Bagwell would enter a tournament for the vacant WCW United States Heavyweight Championship, losing to Meng in the opening round on the April 29 episode of Saturday Night. The Patriot left WCW in May and Bagwell resumed to singles competition while making makeshift tag teams with Jim Duggan, Johnny B. Badd and Alex Wright to regain the World Tag Team Championship but could not regain the titles.

On the September 16 episode of Saturday Night, Bagwell formed a tag team with Scotty Riggs called the American Males as they defeated State Patrol in their debut match. The newly formed team defeated Harlem Heat to win the World Tag Team Championship on the September 18 episode of Monday Nitro. They lost the titles back to Harlem Heat on the October 28 episode of Saturday Night. Bagwell participated in the first-ever World War 3 battle royal at the namesake event for the vacant WCW World Heavyweight Championship, which was won by Randy Savage. The American Males received a rematch for the tag team titles against Harlem Heat on the December 4 episode of Nitro, which they failed to win. The team would find no success afterwards and would lose most of their matches throughout 1996. During this time, Bagwell made only two pay-per-view appearances; the first at The Great American Bash, where he lost to Diamond Dallas Page and the second at World War 3, where he participated in the namesake match with the winner earning a title shot for the World Heavyweight Championship, but failed to win the match.

==== New World Order (1996–1999) ====
On November 25, 1996, Bagwell joined the New World Order (nWo) after turning on his partner Scotty Riggs. He soon renamed himself to Buff Bagwell. To go along with his name change he developed the habits of flexing his muscles and would talk to the camera insulting his opponents while complimenting himself. Bagwell began feuding with Riggs, defeating him in a match at Souled Out. Bagwell then represented nWo against Diamond Dallas Page at SuperBrawl VII, which he lost via disqualification after nWo members interfered in the match. Following the event, Bagwell resumed his feud with Riggs, which culminated in a strap match between the two at Uncensored, which Bagwell won. Shortly after, Bagwell formed a tag team with nWo teammate Scott Norton called Vicious and Delicious. The team feuded with established teams like Harlem Heat and Steiner Brothers including a loss to Harlem Heat at Road Wild. While with the nWo, he also competed for New Japan Pro-Wrestling (NJPW) as a part of nWo Japan, the NJPW version of the nWo. When he returned to America, he began a feud with Lex Luger, which later saw Bagwell defeat him, with the assistance of nWo, at Starrcade.

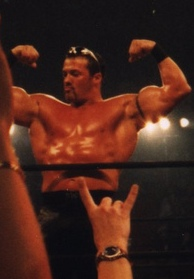
Bagwell posing during a taping of Nitro in 1998

On the April 22, 1998 edition of Thunder, Bagwell wrestled a tag team match with Scott Norton (representing the nWo) against Rick Steiner and Lex Luger which they won when Scott Steiner interfered on his behalf. Just before that, Rick attempted his diving bulldog finishing move, which was not executed correctly and resulted in Bagwell's head striking Steiner's back, jamming his neck and severely injuring him. Bagwell was diagnosed with several damaged vertebrae and developed spinal shock, leading him to use a wheelchair and neck brace for months. He returned for an interview only to be ridiculed by Hollywood Hogan and shoved to the entryway floor. On July 6, after recently having neck surgery, the wheelchair-ridden Bagwell returned to WCW in his home state of Georgia. Bagwell seemed to have a new attitude and even called out Rick Steiner to offer him his forgiveness. Bagwell restrained Rick while fellow nWo member Scott Steiner assaulted him with a steel chair, reaffirming his loyalty to Hogan and the nWo. Bagwell then rose from his wheelchair and helped Scott beat down Rick. Later that same year, on the October 19 edition of Nitro, Bagwell claimed to be done with the nWo after saving Rick during an attack by Scott in the ring. This led to Bagwell convincing Rick to team up together at Halloween Havoc against Scott (stepping in for Scott Hall) and The Giant, who were defending the tag team championships per "nWo (Freebird) rules". During the match, Bagwell once again turned on Rick to again reaffirm his loyalty to the nWo, but their tactics were unsuccessful as Rick would find a way to win the match (and the tag team championships) by himself. In January 1999, the nWo factions reunited, leading Bagwell and Steiner to side with the nWo Wolfpac. Their alliance ended at Uncensored when Bagwell accidentally hit Steiner with a chair, costing him the World Television Championship.

==== New Blood (1999–2000) ====
In June 1999, Bagwell engaged in a rivalry with WCW President Ric Flair and Vice President Roddy Piper after claiming he was being held back. This led to a three-round boxing match with Piper at Bash at the Beach, which saw Bagwell victorious. In September 1999, he feuded with Berlyn when Berlyn issued a challenge to Bagwell, but at Fall Brawl, Bagwell was late coming to the arena and "Hacksaw" Jim Duggan replaced him. The next night on Nitro, Bagwell lost to Berlyn after the interference of his bodyguard, The Wall. In November, he defeated veteran Curt Hennig in a retirement match. Bagwell then feuded with Diamond Dallas Page after he made allegations about Page's wife Kimberly. Having spent much of 1999 feuding with older wrestlers, Bagwell was one of the first to join Eric Bischoff's New Blood alliance, forming a tag team with Shane Douglas while both were members. Bagwell and Douglas eventually won the World Tag Team Championship from Ric Flair and Lex Luger, giving Bagwell his fifth World Tag Team Title reign and rekindling his feud with Luger from two years earlier. At Slamboree, Luger defeated Bagwell via submission with the Torture Rack.

On May 9, 2000 following a Thunder taping in Springfield, Illinois, Bagwell punched and yelled racial slurs at WCW crew member Darrell Miller after he and Bagwell began arguing when Miller attempted to carry equipment through a doorway in which Bagwell was standing. Six days later, Bagwell was charged with battery by the Sangamon County, Illinois State's Attorney's office. In response, WCW suspended Bagwell for thirty days and stripped him of his half of the World Tag Team Championship.

Upon his return, Bagwell attempted to win the World Tag Team Title with Douglas once more, but was unsuccessful. Bagwell, now with Torrie Wilson by his side, wrestled Douglas at Bash at the Beach, but lost when Wilson distracted him and sided with Douglas. Bagwell then began a feud with Chris Kanyon, who began stalking him and harassing Bagwell's mother Judy as a psychological tactic. Bagwell eventually defeated Kanyon in a match where Judy was suspended from a forklift. He rescued his mother despite the surprise interference of actor David Arquette. In August 2000, David Flair's storyline girlfriend Miss Hancock mysteriously became pregnant. Flair quickly accused the womanizing Bagwell, which led to a first blood match at Halloween Havoc, with Flair hoping to obtain a sample of Bagwell's blood to prove he was the father of Hancock's child. Although Bagwell was victorious, Flair managed to get his blood sample when Bagwell's nemesis Lex Luger attacked him after the match. Bagwell was then revealed as not being the father, and the entire pregnancy was eventually found to have been a fabrication.

==== Totally Buff (2000–2001) ====
At Starrcade, Bagwell, who at the time had returned as a backstage interviewer, betrayed Goldberg by trying to cost him his match with Lex Luger. Bagwell's efforts were unsuccessful, but he managed to hit Goldberg with a steel chair after he had pinned Luger. Despite feuding in the past, Bagwell and Luger united and became known as Totally Buff. Totally Buff would go on to defeat Goldberg at Sin after a fan maced Goldberg, allowing Bagwell to pin him. Due to a stipulation in the match, Goldberg was, in storyline, fired. In early 2001, Totally Buff joined Ric Flair's Magnificent Seven stable, and remained with them until WCW's closure. Bagwell went to the WWF and Luger refused.

=== World Wrestling Federation (2001) ===
Shortly after WCW was purchased by the World Wrestling Federation (WWF) in March 2001, Bagwell was one of the first AOL Time Warner contracted wrestlers to accept the offered buy-out on his contract and sign with the WWF. On July 1, 2001, Bagwell faced Booker T at a house show and he made his WWF televised debut on the July 2 episode of Raw is War, facing Booker T for the WCW Championship. The match went to a no-contest after interference from Stone Cold Steve Austin and Kurt Angle. Sports journalist Michael Landsberg reported that many have called the bout "the worst match ever", and remarked that Bagwell is "not a great wrestler". When Bagwell arrived to the Raw tapings on July 9 in Atlanta, Georgia, he was informed he was being released from his contract due to complaints about his attitude and an altercation with fellow WCW alumnus Shane Helms. There were also accusations that Bagwell faked an injury at the July 3 SmackDown! tapings after receiving an aided powerbomb from the Acolytes Protection Agency. The accusations also claimed his mother Judy was calling WWF offices to request that her son get time off to heal from an injury supposedly inflicted to Bagwell from the aided powerbomb and to complain about her son's travel arrangements. Bagwell himself claims that he never understood why he was fired from the WWF.

=== World Wrestling All-Stars (2001–2002) ===
In October 2001, Bagwell joined the upstart World Wrestling All-Stars (WWA) promotion for its tour of Australia, Ireland, and the United Kingdom. At its inaugural pay-per-view, The Inception, Bagwell competed in a tournament to crown the first WWA World Heavyweight Champion. He won a battle royal to progress past the first round, but lost to Jeff Jarrett in the semi-finals. The tour ended in December 2001.

Bagwell returned to Australia for a second tour with WWA in April 2002, then made a third tour, this one in Dublin and the United Kingdom followed, where he mostly faced Stevie Ray and defeated him in several matches. He continued with the WWA into 2002, where in April, he took part in the Eruption pay-per-view. This time, he teamed up with his WWA rival Stevie Ray in an unsuccessful effort against Brian Christopher and Ernest Miller. In the autumn of 2002, he toured the UK and took part in the Retribution pay-per-view. During this tour, he often took part in the main event as a tag team match also involving Sting, Lex Luger and Nathan Jones. At the pay-per-view, he teamed up with Johnny Swinger to face Norman Smiley and Malice in a losing effort.

=== NWA: Total Nonstop Action / Total Nonstop Action Wrestling (2002–2003, 2006, 2026) ===
Bagwell made his TNA debut on June 19, 2002, NWA-TNA where he participated in the Gauntlet for the Gold for the NWA World Heavyweight Championship but failed to win the title. On the July 3 NWA-TNA, Bagwell and Apolo lost to The Rainbow Express. On the September 18 NWA-TNA, Bagwell and B.G. James competed in a Tag Team Battle Royal Gauntlet For The Gold Match but failed to win the match. On the May 7, 2003 NWA-TNA, Bagwell competed in the Anarchy in the Asylum battle royal which was won by Glenn Gilbertti.

Bagwell returned to TNA on the April 27, 2006 episode of Impact! as the first of Sting's possible tag team partners for Sacrifice on May 14. Bagwell also appeared on the September 28 episode of Impact! in several segments, including a press conference, a video package, and a live segment where he briefly brawled with Jeff Jarrett. Bagwell also competed in two live events in TNA on December 15, 2006, Bagwell and Ron Killings defeated David Young and Elix Skipper and the next night Bagwell and Rhino defeated David Young and Elix Skipper. At a 2008 live event in Florida, Bagwell expressed that he would have liked to work a deal with TNA because it reminded him of his days in WCW.

On March 26, 2026, Bagwell made an appearance on Impact!, being interviewed by Gia Miller, and suggesting he would be open to another match.

=== Independent circuit (2001–2024) ===
After his final appearance in TNA, Bagwell had resumed wrestling on the independent circuit, most prominently for the National Wrestling Alliance (NWA) territory Mid-Atlantic Championship Wrestling and Universal Championship Wrestling. After recovering from his injuries, Bagwell resumed his wrestling career and, in early March 2013, he won American Premier Wrestling's Heavyweight Championship after defeating "Cowboy" Jeremy Young at APW's Brawl VI event. On May 24, 2014, Bagwell competed in the JT Lightning Invitational Tournament held by Absolute Intense Wrestling, where he won his first round match against Jock Samson before losing to Ethan Page in the quarterfinals. In September 2018, under the management of Colton Menzel and Zach Salaam, Bagwell competed unsuccessfully in a UCW Heavyweight Title match against former WWE star Rob Conway at UCW's "A Tribute fit for a King" event. This was the first time Bagwell and Conway had ever faced each other. Bagwell's last match was on April 21, 2024 teaming with Big John Dalton, defeating Lord Gaston and Sir Matthew for Memphis Wrestling. On November 23, 2024, Bagwell served as the special enforcer for Evan Golden vs Heath Slater for the Beside the Ring Championship in Elizabethton, Tennessee. Bagwell was blinded by E.Z. Money, allowing Golden to knock out Slater and retain the title.

In July 2025, Bagwell, who has claimed to be suffering from lingering injuries which have resulted from a car crash which occurred in 2020, would have one of his legs mostly amputated. Nevertheless, Bagwell has stated that he still hopes to get back in the ring.

== Personal life ==
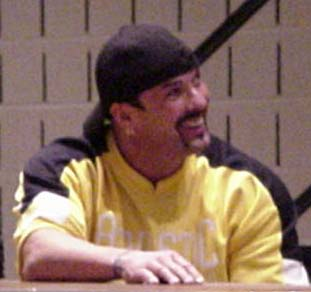
Bagwell in 2005

On April 23, 2012, 14 years after he suffered his neck injury on Thunder, Bagwell was seriously injured in a car crash, suffering broken bones in his neck, face and jaw. According to the Woodstock police report, Bagwell had called his wife to tell her that he was about to suffer a seizure while driving. He was subsequently taken to WellStar Kennestone Hospital in his hometown of Marietta, where he was placed in the intensive care unit. On April 24, fellow WCW alumnus and former tag team partner Scott Norton released a statement via Twitter to confirm that Bagwell was going to be all right. On April 25, Universal Championship Wrestling performer and Bagwell's brother John released a statement to confirm that Bagwell's condition was improving, but that he still required breathing and feeding tubes and would undergo surgery once the swelling in his face and neck subsided. On April 28, Bagwell's mother Judy revealed to TMZ that he had been taken off the breathing tube, was able to eat solid foods, and was able to talk. On May 3, Universal Championship Wrestling announced via Twitter that Bagwell was able to walk again, but still had a tingling sensation in his arms and hands. UCW also stated that he had four plates surgically inserted in his face and that his jaw was wired shut after surgery.

Bagwell was involved in another car crash on August 16, 2020, suffering broken ribs, a broken right hip, a broken left socket bone, a broken nose, and a torn right groin muscle. According to Cobb County police, Bagwell had been driving impaired due to prescription medication. As a result of the accident, Bagwell suffered lingering injuries and ultimately underwent an above-the-knee amputation of most of his right leg on July 10, 2025.

Following his wrestling career, Bagwell became a male escort in order to pay medical bills.

=== Legal issues ===
On August 9, 2016, Bagwell filed a lawsuit in the United States District Court of Connecticut against WWE for royalties from material he is featured in on the WWE Network. The suit was dismissed in December 2017.

On May 22, 2021, Bagwell was arrested in Cobb County on multiple charges including speeding, hit and run, and giving false information to law enforcement officers.

== Filmography ==
=== Film ===
- No Holds Barred (1989) (uncredited extra)
- Day of the Warrior (1996) as The Warrior
- L.E.T.H.A.L. Ladies: Return to Savage Beach (1998) as The Warrior
- Terror Tract (2000) as Pound Dispatcher
- The Good, The Bad, and The Buff: The Marc Bagwell Journey (2015)

=== Television ===
- Charmed (2001) in episode Wrestling With Demons
- I Want a Famous Face (2005) as himself
- Gigolos (2014) as himself
- Living The Dream (2017) as Krakatoa

== Championships and accomplishments ==
- American Premier Wrestling
  - APW Heavyweight Championship (1 time)
- AWA Superstars of Wrestling
  - AWA Superstars of Wrestling World Tag Team Championship (1 time) – with The Patriot
- Cauliflower Alley Club
  - Men's Wrestling Award (2024)
- Cleveland All-Pro World Wrestling
  - CAPW Unified World Heavyweight Championship (1 time)
- Georgia All-Star Wrestling
  - GASW Tag Team Championship (1 time) – with Chris Walker
- Great American Wrestling Federation
  - GAWF Heavyweight Championship (1 time)
- Great Championship Wrestling
  - GCW Tag Team Championship (1 time) – Scott Steele
- Mayhem Wrestling
  - Mayhem Heavyweight Championship (1 time)
- Memphis Wrestling
  - Memphis Wrestling Tag Team Championship (1 time) - with John Dalton
- Mid-Atlantic Championship Wrestling^{1}
  - Mid-Atlantic Heavyweight Championship (3 times)
  - Mid-Atlantic Tag Team Championship (3 times) – with Dusty Rhodes (1) and Rikki Nelson (2)
- North American Championship Wrestling
  - NACW Tag Team Championship (1 time) – with Ricky Morton
- North Carolina Wrestling Association
  - NCWA Heavyweight Championship (1 time)
- Not Rated Pro Wrestling
  - NRPW World Championship (1 time)
- NWA Blue Ridge
  - NWA Blue Ridge Television Championship (1 time)
- Pro Wrestling Illustrated
  - Ranked No. 66 of the 500 top singles wrestlers in the "PWI 500" in 1999
  - Ranked No. 221 of the top 500 singles wrestlers of the "PWI Years" in 2003
- Ron's Championship Wrestling
  - RCW Heavyweight Championship (1 time)
- Ultimate NWA
  - Ultimate NWA Heavyweight Championship (1 time)
- World Championship Wrestling
  - WCW World Tag Team Championship (5 times) – with 2 Cold Scorpio (1), The Patriot (2), Scotty Riggs (1), and Shane Douglas (1)
- Wrestling Observer Newsletter
  - Best Gimmick (1996) – nWo
  - Feud of the Year (1996) New World Order vs. World Championship Wrestling
  - Most Embarrassing Wrestler (2001)
- Wrestling War Zone
  - WWZ Championship (1 time)
- Xtreme Intense Championship Wrestling
  - XICW Midwest Heavyweight Championship (2 times)

^{1}This Mid-Atlantic Championship Wrestling, while currently operating out of the same region of the United States and having revised some of the championships used by the original Mid-Atlantic Championship Wrestling, is not the same promotion that was once owned by Jim Crockett, Jr. and subsequently sold to Ted Turner in 1988. It is a separate NWA-affiliated promotion.

== See also ==
- The American Males
- The New Blood
- The New World Order
- Stars and Stripes
- Vicious and Delicious
