= Vicious and Delicious =

Professional wrestling tag team

Tag team
- Members: Scott Norton; Buff Bagwell
- Billed heights: Norton: 6 ft 3 in (1.91 m); Bagwell: 6 ft 1 in (1.85 m)
- Debut: 1996
- Disbanded: April 22, 1998

Vicious and Delicious was a professional wrestling tag team composed of Scott Norton and Buff Bagwell, who competed in World Championship Wrestling from 1996 to 1998.

== History ==
=== Formation ===
Previously, Marcus Alexander Bagwell had been working on a tag team called The American Males, alongside Scotty Riggs. Scott Norton, having recently seen his tag team Fire and Ice (with Ice Train) break up, had been doing very little.

WCW President Eric Bischoff had recently been outed as the man behind the New World Order, and he extended an ultimatum to the WCW roster: Join the nWo, or be targeted by it. Norton and Bagwell were two of the wrestlers that answered the call, Bagwell turning on Riggs in the process.

=== The team ===
Vicious and Delicious fought mainly in the midcards against the nWo's enemies. They were usually accompanied to the ring by the nWo "Head of Security" Vincent, and often teamed with Konnan, another nWo midcarder.

They fought with The Steiner Brothers, but they were never able to win the tag team titles. The tag title scene in WCW was dominated by a feud between The Steiner Brothers and the Outsiders through most of 1997 and 1998, and as The Outsiders and Vicious and Delicious were teammates in the nWo, there was little room for Vicious and Delicious to advance in the division.

As Scott Norton was splitting his time between WCW and New Japan Pro-Wrestling, the tag team was inactive as often as not, with Bagwell wrestling singles while Norton was in Japan.

=== Breakup ===
On the April 22, 1998 episode of WCW Thunder, Bagwell was severely injured by a flying bulldog off the top rope from Rick Steiner. With Bagwell injured, the team was quietly dropped. Norton would spend the rest of his WCW career mainly winning squash matches in the lower midcard, while Bagwell, once recovered, moved on to team with Scott Steiner.

== See also ==
- The American Males
- New World Order (professional wrestling)
- Stars and Stripes
