= I Want a Famous Face =

Reality TV series about plastic surgery

- Genre: Documentary; Reality
- Country of origin: United States
- Original language: English
- No. of seasons: 2
- No. of episodes: 14

Production
- Executive producer: Kimberly Belcher Cowin
- Running time: Approx. 24 minutes

Original release
- Network: MTV
- Release: March 15, 2004 – June 7, 2005

I Want a Famous Face is a reality television program on MTV, produced by Pink Sneakers Productions.

The show features young adults who undergo plastic surgery with the goal of looking more like a famous person. Celebrities that participants have chosen to look more like include Pamela Anderson, Jennifer Lopez, Jessica Simpson, Britney Spears, Brad Pitt, Ricky Martin and Victoria Beckham.

The show also features short spots on how plastic surgery can go wrong from people that have experienced poor health resulting from their attempts at plastic surgery.
