= Sturgis Motorcycle Rally =

Annual motorcycle rally in Sturgis, South Dakota, US

Coordinates: 44°24′52″N 103°30′32″W

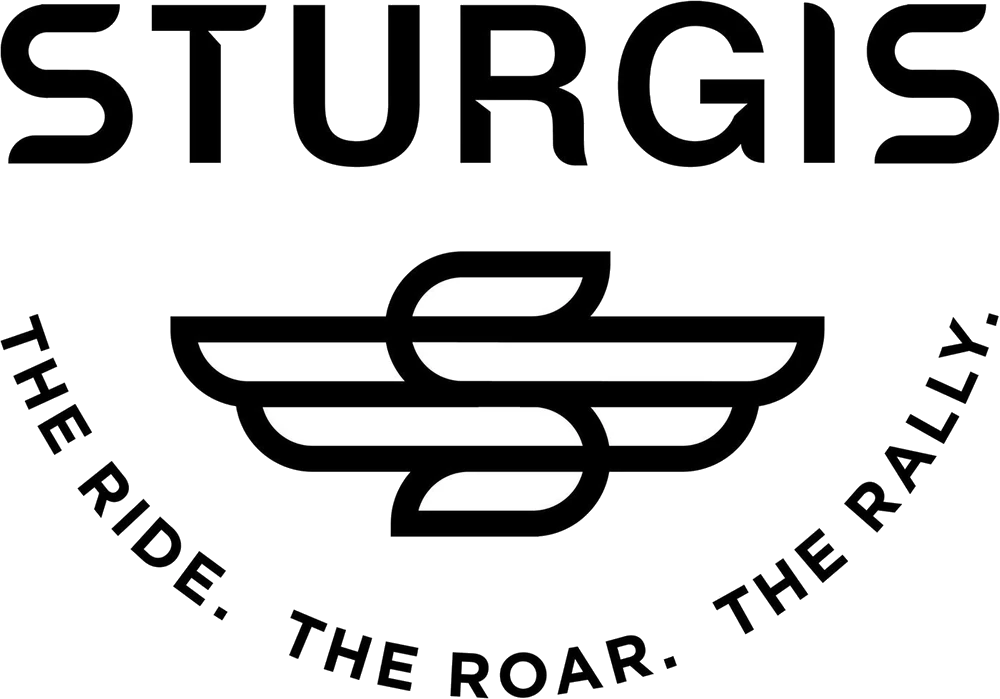

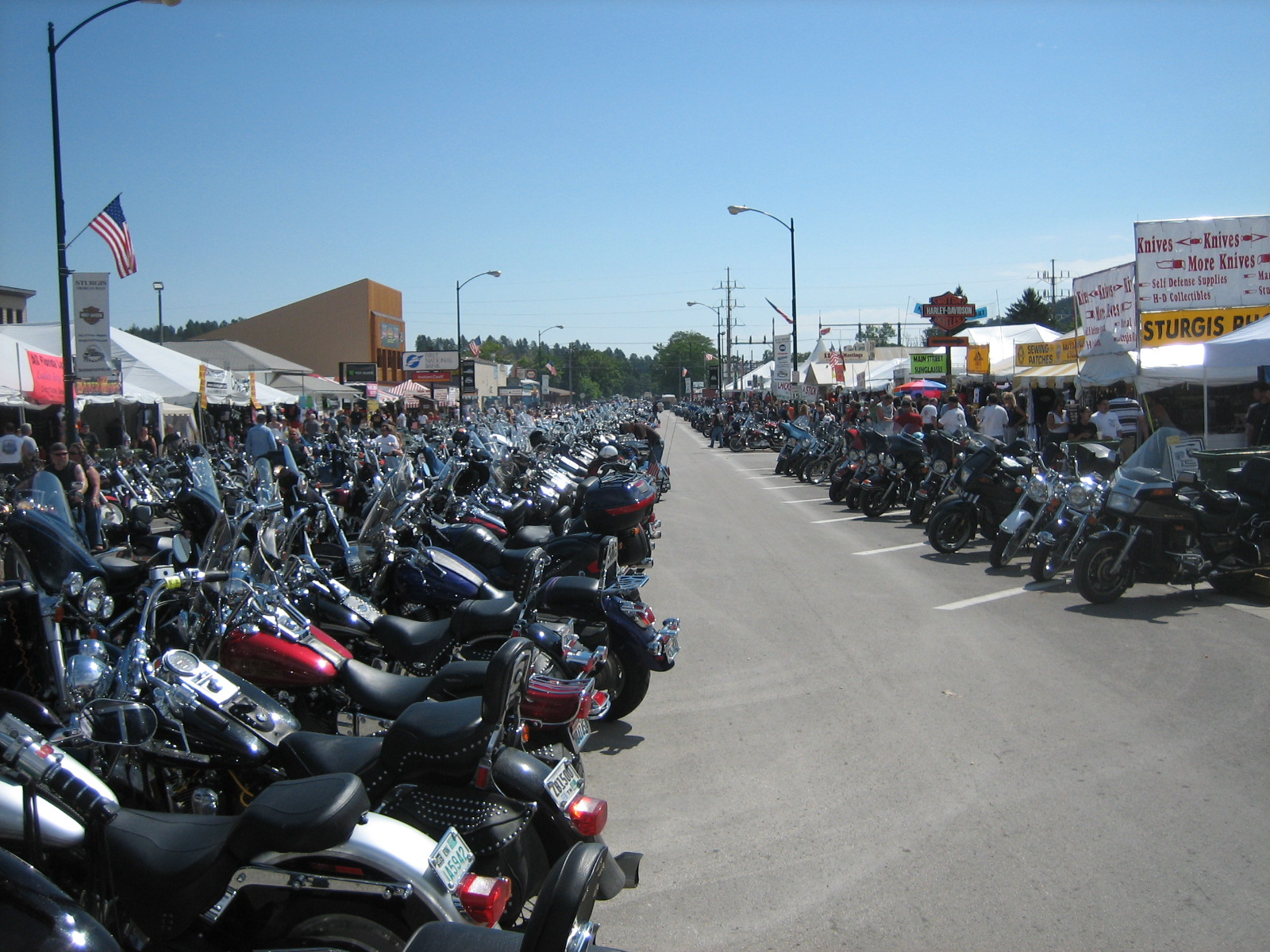
- Motorcycles lined up on Main Street during the 2006 event.
- Genre: Motorcycle rally
- Dates: Starts first Friday in August (for 10 days)
- Locations: Sturgis, South Dakota, U.S.
- Founded: August 14, 1938
- Most recent: August 7–16, 2026
- Next event: August 6–15, 2027
- Attendance: Highest: 739,000 (2015)
- Website: sturgismotorcyclerally.com

The Sturgis Motorcycle Rally is a motorcycle rally held annually in Sturgis, South Dakota, and the surrounding Black Hills region of the United States. It began in 1938 by a group of Indian Motorcycle riders and was originally held for stunts and races. Since then, the rally has become a pluralistic endeavor that consists of events put on by many different groups. Attendance has historically been around 500,000 people, reaching a high of over 700,000 in 2015. The event takes place over 10 days and generates around $800 million in annual revenue.

== History ==
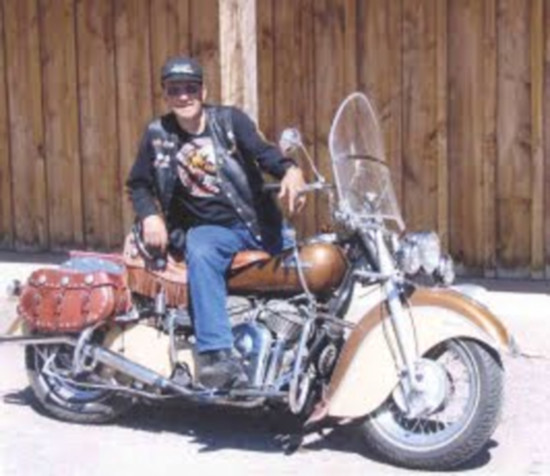
Indian Ed Spilker, one of the original Jackpine gypsies and cofounder of the Sturgis Motorcycle Rally

The first rally was held by Indian Motorcycle riders on August 14, 1938, by the Jackpine Gypsies motorcycle club. The club still owns and operates the tracks, hillclimb, and field areas where the rally is centered. The first event was called the "Black Hills Motor Classic." The founder was Clarence "Pappy" Hoel. He purchased an Indian motorcycle franchise in Sturgis in 1936 and formed the Jackpine Gypsies in 1938. The Jackpine Gypsies were inducted to the Motorcycle Hall of Fame in 1997. Hoel was inducted into the AMA Hall of Fame the following year.

The focus of a motorcycle rally was originally racing and stunts. In 1961, the rally was expanded to include the Hillclimb and Motocross races. This could include half-mile track racing (the first year in Sturgis, there were 19 participants), intentional board wall crashes, ramp jumps and head-on collisions with automobiles.

The Sturgis Rally has been held every year, with exceptions during World War II. In 1942, the decision was made by the Black Hills Motor Classic Committee to not hold their regular event until after the war was over. The reason given for not holding the event was the "inability to obtain high-class talent." The Sturgis Rally would not be held again until 1946, when the Black Hills Classic Reorganized and made plans to revive the motorcycle rally.

Originally the rally was composed of two separate events that spanned three days. Starting of the event was a Gypsy tour, where riders would be guided through the Black Hills by an escort of Jackpine Gypsy club members. The following two days would be filled with motorcycle and automobile races. Additional events would be held in the downtown district of Sturgis, including parades, dances, and animal shows.

Through the 1970s and early 1980s, many attendees camped in City Park. When a record 40,000 visitors arrived in Sturgis in 1980, local residents became concerned with the behavior of these attendees. In 1982, a referendum was presented to the city asking them to no longer provide municipal services such as parking on Main Street, law enforcement and allowing camping in City Park. City attorney Dale Hansen advised that any vote would be non-binding and could not stop the rally because the motorcycle rally is sponsored by private groups. Although the referendum was defeated 1,454 to 826, the City of Sturgis followed the mayor's committee recommendation to prohibit camping in City Park and eliminate downtown street vendors.

For many years, the rally was a seven-day event starting on a Monday during the first full week of August.

In October 2016, the city of Sturgis expanded the city's dates to the 10-day format and have the rally start on the Friday before the first full week of August and end on the second Sunday. In 2017, the Rally became a 10-day event starting on the first Friday in August.

== Attendance ==
The South Dakota Department of Transportation provides official traffic counts, which sometimes differ from official attendance figures. Attendance is higher on major anniversaries (e.g. 75th in 2015) and one or two years prior to the anniversary and falls off the following year or two. "Attendance" is defined as vehicle crossings at about a dozen roads around Sturgis for 10 days, city-wide trash collection, vendor licenses issued in Sturgis, and other sources, not just the actual number of people attending the rally. Most attendees are counted multiple times, so the actual number of people attending is much lower than the listed attendance.

Year	SDDOT traffic count	Official attendance
1990	528,676	400,000
1999	539,475	325,000
2000	604,441	633,000
2001	530,667	400,000
2002	561,752	450,000
2003	605,140	502,000
2004	547,370	514,951
2005	524,656	525,250
2006	449,527	456,968
2007	461,507	507,234
2008	405,475	414,917
2009	394,009	442,163
2010	459,968	466,769
2011	415,367	416,727
2012		445,700
2013	516,378	467,338
2014		442,200
2015	c. 1,000,000	739,000
2016	c.360,000	448,000 – 463,412
2017	376,033–469,100	480,000
2018	505,969	495,000
2019	499,654	490,000
2020	462,000	445,000
2021	525,768	555,000
2022	497,835	505,000
2023	458,161	617,000

== Trademarks and ownership ==
For many years, the Sturgis Chamber of Commerce claimed ownership of the words "Sturgis", "Sturgis Motorcycle Rally" and "Sturgis Rally & Races" through an attempted trademark claim. Those trademark claims were later transferred to Sturgis Motorcycle Rally Inc., which made efforts to enforce the claims.

In 2018, the United States Court of Appeals for the Eighth Circuit Court ruled the trademark invalid in a dispute between Sturgis Motorcycle Rally Inc. (SMRI) and Rushmore Photo and Gifts. In their ruling, the Court stated that the Sturgis Motorcycle Rally is a pluralistic endeavor promoted by multiple organizations. They further stated that the city's involvement does not extend beyond the provision of municipal services.

The record stated, “We agree and hold that the jury could not infer from the onerous planning that the City undertakes to provide infrastructure for the rally that the City was the organizer or sponsor of the rally. To allow such an inference would be tantamount to saying that it would be reasonable to infer that the City of New York organizes the sessions of the United Nations General Assembly because of everything it does to assist their occurrence. One cannot infer from the fact that a city augments its municipal services to accommodate those who attend an event-e.g., a funeral or political protest-that it organizes, promotes, or sponsors the event in a way that would permit it to acquire ownership over the event or its intellectual property."

For many years the city has been in an agreement with SMRI, and its predecessor-in-interest, the Sturgis Area Chamber of Commerce, to license use of the words "Sturgis", "Sturgis Motorcycle Rally" and "Sturgis Rally & Races". That agreement involving invalid trademark enforcement generated millions of dollars in royalties and sponsorship dollars. On December 11, 2019, Federal Judge Jeffery Viken ordered that SMRI may no longer attempt to claim ownership of "Sturgis", "Sturgis Motorcycle Rally" or "Sturgis Rally & Races". The court order called for trademark cancellations to be sent to the United States Patent and Trademark Office.

== Rally impact on community and nationwide ==
The City of Sturgis has calculated that the Rally brings over $800 million to South Dakota annually. The City of Sturgis earned almost $270,000 in 2011 from selling event guides and sponsorships. In 2019, the Rally generated $628,116 for local charities. In 2020, the rally provided 21% of the city's annual revenue.

There were 187 individuals jailed at the 2020 rally. Approximately $250,000 worth of motorcycles are stolen annually.

Rally-goers are a mix of white-collar and blue-collar workers and are generally welcomed as an important source of income for Sturgis and surrounding areas. The rally turns local roads into "parking lots", and draws local law enforcement away from routine patrols. Furthermore, the large numbers of people visiting the town and region served as a model for the state of Oregon in preparation for the solar eclipse of August 21, 2017, given the expected impact on emergency services.

There are generally several motorcycle related fatalities each year. The 75th anniversary in 2015 saw the highest number of fatalities at 15. The next most deadly years were 2023 and 1990 which both had 11 fatalities. In addition there are many more motorcycle accidents which are non-fatal. The number of non-fatal accidents generally range from 45-70 accidents. One of the leading causes of accidents is riders failing to navigate turns. Another leading factor is often alcohol or drugs.

== Rallies during the COVID-19 pandemic ==
Concerns about the possible spread of the COVID-19 pandemic and travel restrictions were expected to lead to lower attendance in 2020. The 2020 final traffic count was about 462,000.

While some health officials and local leaders wanted to cancel the rally, that proved impossible since many events take place beyond the city limits. The 250,000 participants were recommended but not required to wear face masks in a state that had seen 9,371 confirmed cases, and 144 deaths due to contraction of COVID-19 (0.016% of the state's population). Several checkpoints to stop outsiders were put up on the Cheyenne River Indian Reservation, an action that state and federal officials consider illegal. The 2020 final traffic count was about 462,000, with many attendees not wearing masks or observing social distancing.

Cell phone data showed that by August 25, 2020, 61% of US counties had been visited by a Sturgis attendee.

As of August 20, 2020, seven COVID-19 cases in the Nebraska Panhandle had been traced to the Rally, and 22 cases had been reported among out-of-state attendees. As of August 21, 2020, Minnesota had 15 cases traced to the rally, with more cases expected, and a few cases had been reported in Wyoming. Public health notices were issued for One-Eyed Jack's Saloon, The Knuckle Saloon, The Broken Spoke, and Asylum Tattoo in Sturgis, and for the Bumpin’ Buffalo Bar and Grill in Hill City. Some exposures in Minnesota could not be traced to specific locations. A Minnesota public health official urged all rallygoers to monitor for symptoms for 14 days, adding that "if you are feeling ill after returning from the event, please get tested and self-isolate while you wait for the test results."

By August 24, 2020, there were a total of 76 cases linked to the rally (0.016% of attendees), in four states, South Dakota, Minnesota, Nebraska and Wyoming, with additional reports of cases in North Dakota and Washington State. The number rose to 103 (0.022% of attendees) on August 26, in at least eight states, including 37 cases in South Dakota, and cases in Wisconsin, Montana, Wyoming, Nebraska, Washington and North Dakota. On August 26, 6 cases were reported in New Hampshire. On August 27, over 20 cases were reported in Colorado. Two of the cases reported in Minnesota were people who had been Sturgis event employees or volunteers.

On August 27, 2020, the results of mass testing in Sturgis became available. Out of 650 tests there were 26 positive results, all asymptomatic.

As of August 28, 2020, 46 cases in Minnesota had been linked to the rally, including two hospitalizations, with one person in intensive care. An additional cluster of secondary transmission from the rally was identified at a wedding. The number of infections increased substantially although health authorities suspected the real number could be far higher because many attendees refused to cooperate with contact tracers. On September 2, 2020, the first COVID-19 death related to the 2020 Sturgis rally was reported in Minnesota.

A paper by economist Dhaval Dave and colleagues at IZA Institute of Labor Economics estimated that the 2020 rally, at which few attendees wore masks, could have infected 267,000 and resulted in $12.2 billion in health care costs. A partnership between Slate magazine, New America, and Arizona State University, questioned the methodology and thereby contested the findings of the study. The Slate analysis did find the IZA estimates for Meade County, South Dakota, between 177 and 195 cases (0.038–0.042% of attendees), to be consistent with the raw data. South Dakota governor Kristi Noem said the study was "fiction," and an "attack on those who exercised their personal freedom to attend Sturgis...Predictably, some in the media breathlessly report on this non-peer-reviewed model, built on incredibly faulty assumptions that do not reflect the actual facts and data here in South Dakota." State epidemiologist Joshua Clayton stated, "From what we know the results do not align with what we know."

By September 8, 2020, South Dakota reported 124 residents had become ill after attending the rally. On November 20, 2020, the Centers for Disease Control and Prevention (CDC) identified 51 people from Minnesota who were infected at the 2020 rally and another 35 who got secondary infections from attendees; four of the 86 were hospitalized and one died. Researchers noted that the actual figures were probably higher since many people who attended the rally refused to speak to them. They also pointed out that the study only involved one state, although rally attendees came from across the country.

Concerns about virus transmission appeared again before the 2021 rally, expected to draw 700,000 visitors. The City of Sturgis planned to make 15-minute self test kits for SARS‑CoV‑2 available during the 2021 rally.

== Transportation to Sturgis ==
Shipping companies transport thousands of motorcycles to Sturgis for attendees who arrive via airline.

== Media coverage ==
=== Print and Radio ===
The Rapid City Journal and South Dakota Public Broadcasting feature daily coverage of the Sturgis Rally.

The Seattle Times covered some of the 2008 Sturgis Rally while rock band Judd Hoos was playing at the Loud American Roadhouse. All Gas No Brakes covered the 2020 rally.

=== Television ===
In 1997, notable attendees at the rally included the crew from the television series COPS, and basketball player Dennis Rodman.

From 1996 to 1999, World Championship Wrestling (WCW) held a pay-per-view event called Road Wild (Hog Wild for the 1996 event). The inaugural event on August 10, 1996 also featured preliminary matches that were aired live on WCW Saturday Night on TBS. Rodman participated at the show in the final year in 1999.

Sturgis was featured in Season 7, Episode 13 of King of the Hill, "Queasy Rider." The episode features Hank and Peggy buying a motorcycle to rekindle their marriage and traveling to the event.

Television coverage of the festival by the VH1 Classic network includes interviews and performances as well as rock music videos from the Buffalo Chip Campground. The rally was featured in 2005 as part of the ESPN SportsCenter promotion 50 States in 50 Days.

The shows American Chopper and Orange County Choppers featuring bike builders Paul Teutul Sr and Paul Teutul Jr had multiple episodes that featured bikes being built for, and brought to the Sturgis Rally. In American Chopper season 2, episode 10 "David Mann Bike 1", Paul Sr, Paul Jr and the rest of the crew go to the Sturgis Rally. Paul Sr talks about how he has been going to the rally for a long time and reflects on all the people he had met at the rally. One of those people was artist David Mann, who had been in the hospital at the time and would die one month later, on September 11th, 2004. Paul Sr credits David Mann's paintings as the reason he wanted to start building choppers. American Chopper season 7, episodes 5-9 is a bike build-off between Paul Sr and Paul Jr, in which they compete to build bikes to be debuted at the Sturgis Rally. Paul Sr built an electric drag bike called "The Lawless Drag Bike"; meanwhile Paul Jr built two bikes, "The Anti-Venom Bike" and "The Geico Bike". Episodes 8 and 9 are spent in Sturgis, while episodes 5-7 are focused on building those bikes. The bikes were debuted on stage at the Buffalo Chip. In American Chopper season 11, episode 1 "Welcome Back", Paul Jr makes a trip to Sturgis to meet with the owner of the Buffalo Chip, Rod Woodruff. They discuss building a bike for the Buffalo Chip. In season 11, episode 2's "Getting the Bike Back Together", Paul Jr unveils the "Legend's Ride Chopper" at The Buffalo Chip Speakeasy. In addition to all of the American Chopper episodes filmed in Sturgis, Paul Sr also filmed one episode of his short-lived show Orange County Choppers at the Sturgis Rally. Season 1, episode 2's "The GAF Sturgis Bike" features Paul Sr and his team building a bike for GAF Roofing materials company. The company had the bike built with the request it would be gifted to a veteran at the Sturgis Rally.

Starting in 2009 an American reality television series began airing on the truTV network, Full Throttle Saloon, showing the inner operations at the world's largest biker bar just prior to the rally opening and for the duration of the rally each year.

Sturgis was also featured on American Pickers season 4, episode 6, "What Happens In Sturgis ...". Originally aired January 2, 2012, on the History Channel. "... When Mike tells Frank to pack up for a trip to South Dakota, Frank says he can't. He's secretly going to his 30th annual trip to the legendary Sturgis motorcycle rally, but says he'll cover the shop ...". Sturgis has also been featured in the TV Show Pawn Stars in which Richard and Corey Harrison visit Sturgis with Chumlee Russell on his birthday.

== Gallery ==
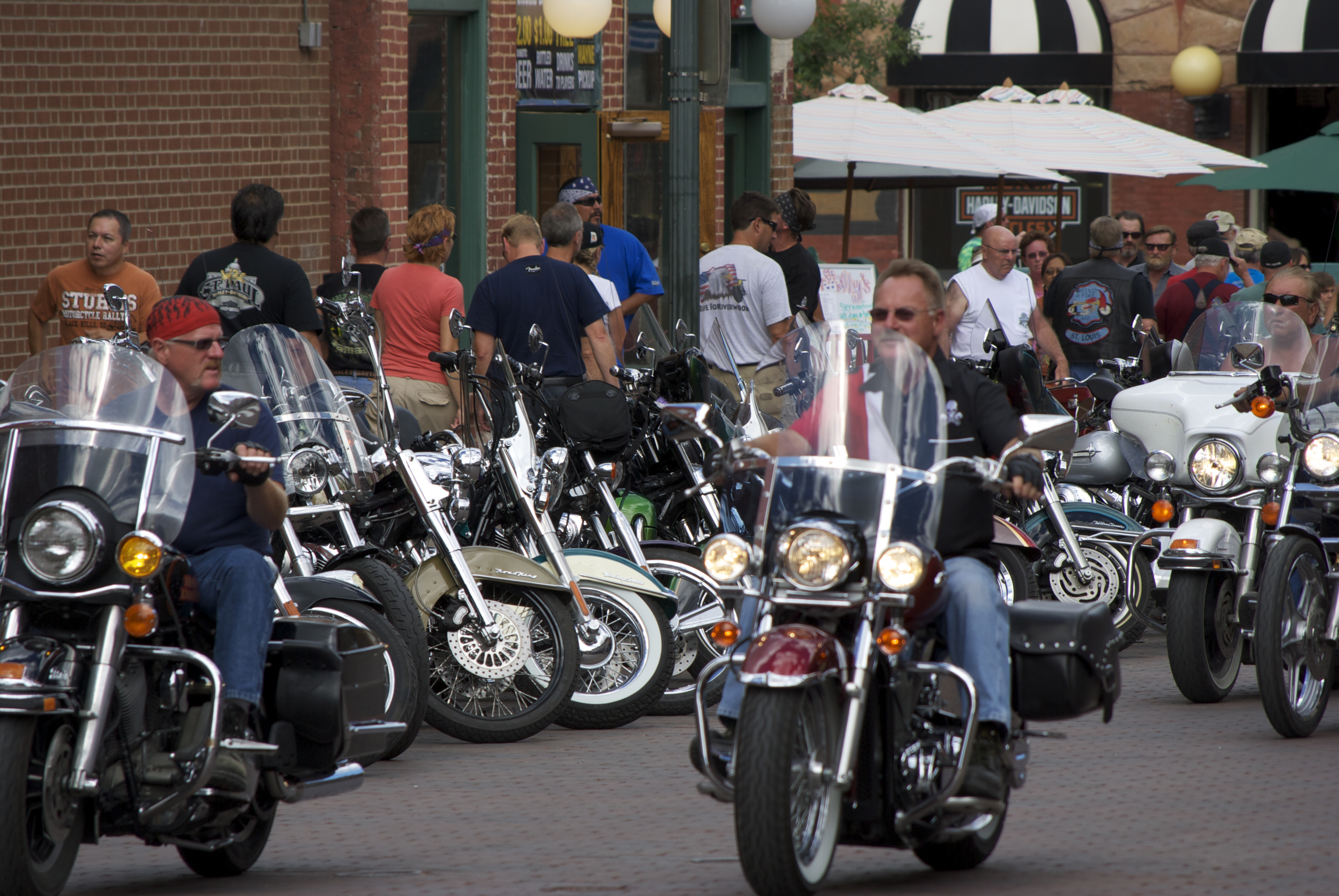

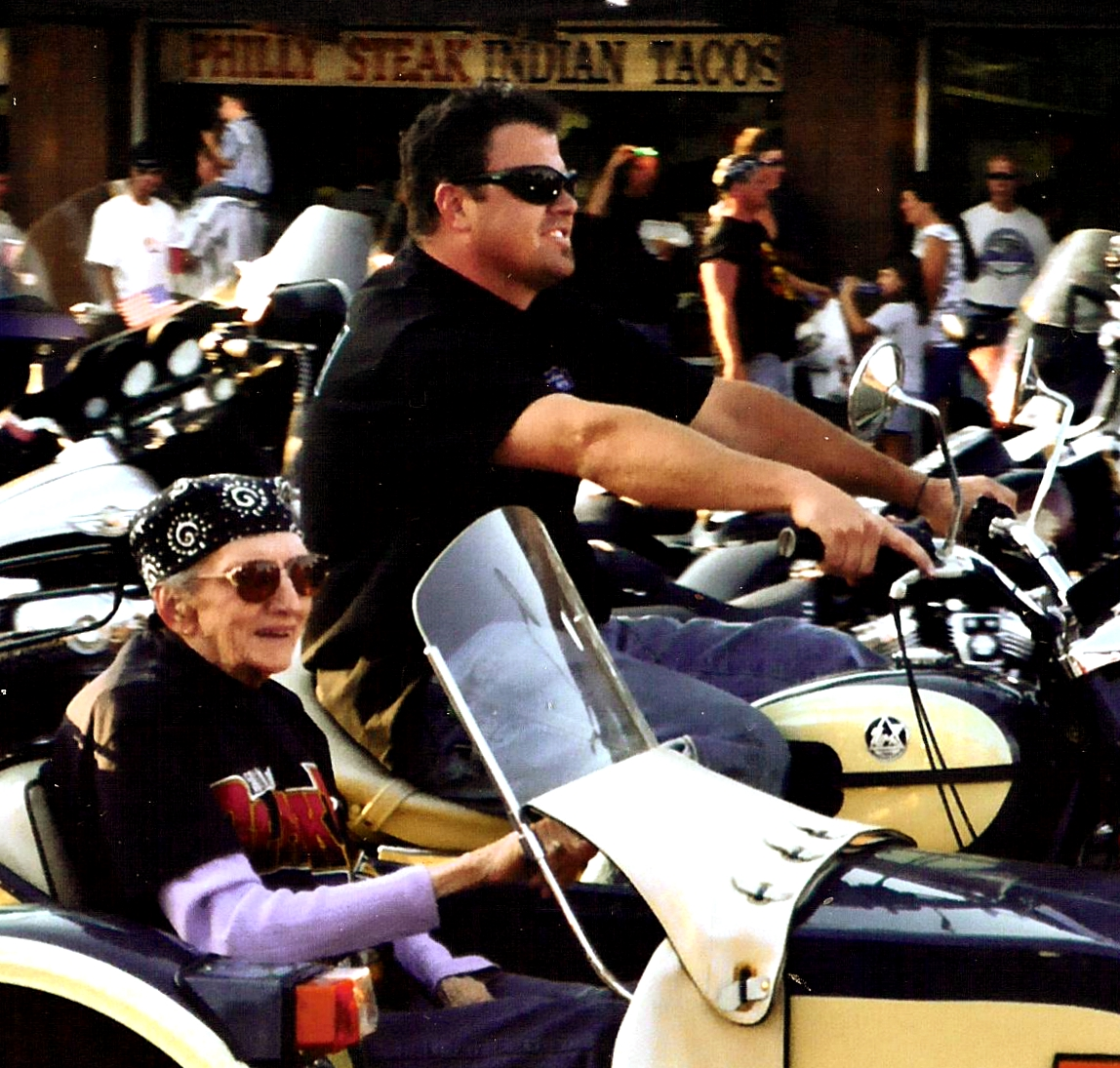

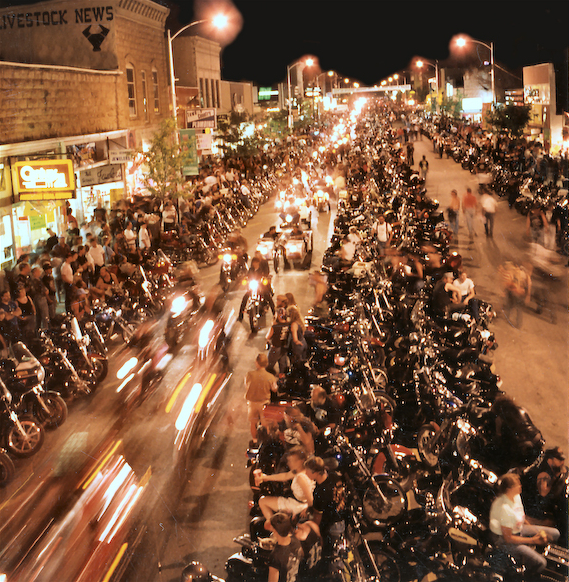
